= Transmission Gully, Wellington =

Valley in New Zealand

Transmission Gully
- Rural locality
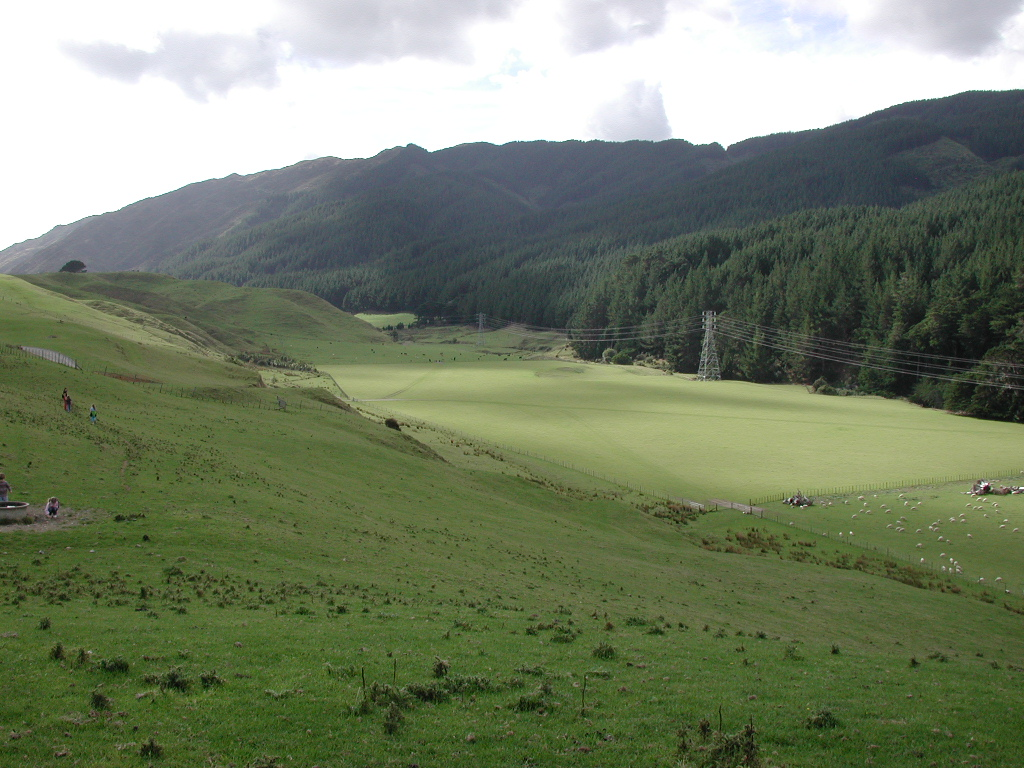
- View of Transmission Gully near Battle Hill Farm in 2008
- Interactive map of Transmission Gully
- Coordinates: 41.064°S 174.944°E
- Country: New Zealand
- Region: Wellington
- Territorial authority: Porirua; Kāpiti Coast
- Electorates: Kapiti; Te Tai Hauāuru (Māori)

Government
  - Territorial Authority: Porirua City Council, Kāpiti Coast District Council
  - Regional council: Greater Wellington Regional Council
  - Mayor of Porirua: Anita Baker
  - Kāpiti Coast Mayor: Janet Holborow
  - Kapiti MP: Tim Costley
  - Te Tai Hauāuru MP: Debbie Ngarewa-Packer
- Postcode(s): 5381; 5034

The Transmission Gully is a gully in Wellington, it is also a chain of steep-sided, isolated valleys in the Wellington Region of New Zealand, runs approximately north–south between the Kāpiti Coast and Porirua.

== Etymology ==
The gully's name comes from the 110,000-volt transmission line that formerly ran through it. The line, built in 1924, linked Wellington to the Mangahao Power Station near Shannon, and later to the wider North Island transmission grid. Apart from the motorway, the only other road access through Transmission Gully is the narrow and winding Paekākāriki Hill Road. Beginning at Paekākāriki, it travels up and over the western ridge of Transmission Gully, and then gradually descends the western bank along most of the length of the gully to Pāuatahanui.

== Geography ==
Despite lying mostly within the boundaries of Porirua City, Transmission Gully is sparsely populated, and most of the land is farmland, forest, or scrub. There are some areas with lifestyle blocks, particularly near Pāuatahanui, and Transmission Gully is also home to Battle Hill Farm Forest Park.

== History ==
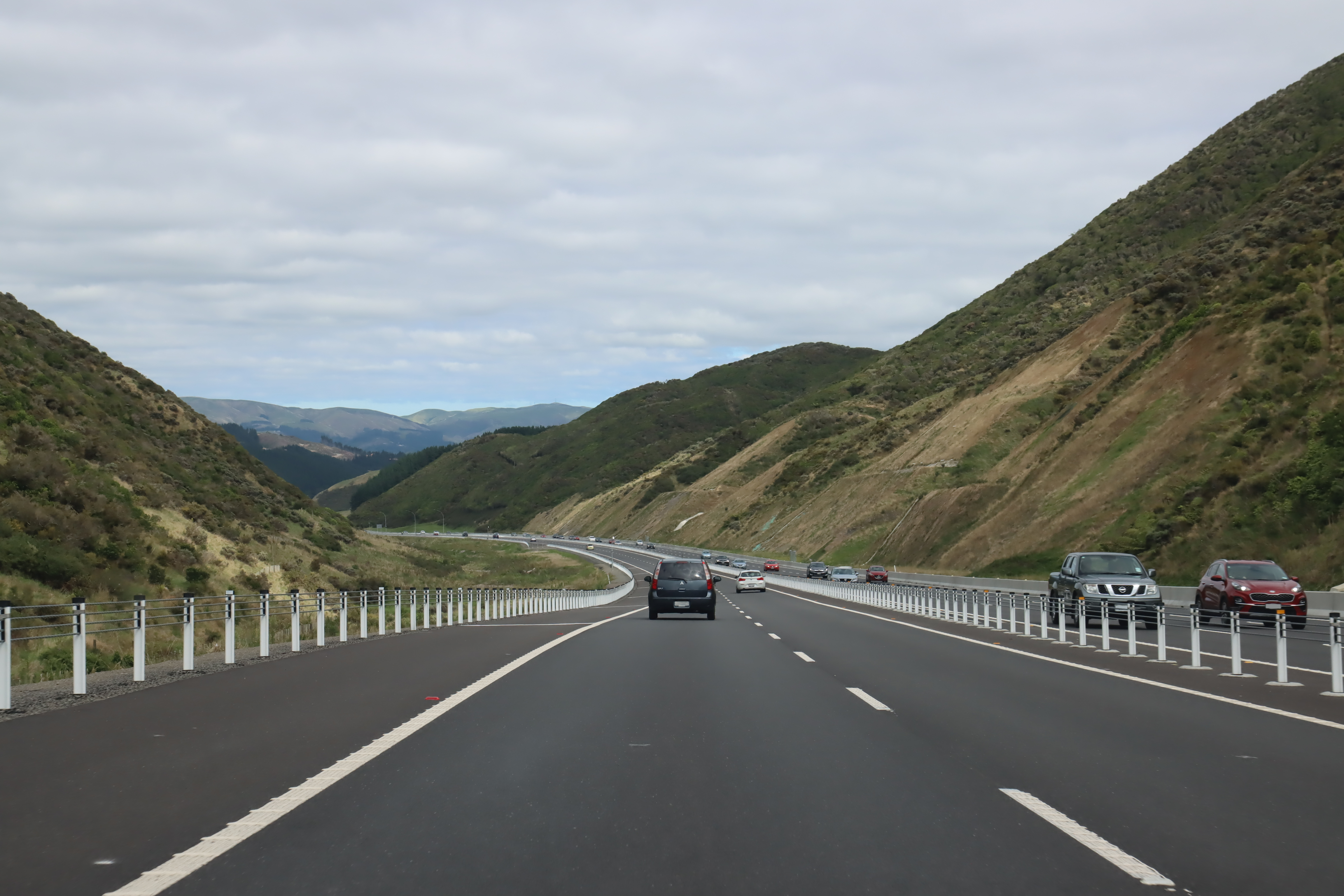
Transmission Gully Motorway

The 1879 proposal for a Haywards–Plimmerton line railway route north from Wellington envisaged using these valleys; the line was never built.

The Transmission Gully motorway running through the gully was opened in March 2022. It is part of State Highway 1 and was constructed as part of the 2008–2017 National Government's Roads of National Significance package. It will not, however, offer any access to the gully itself, as only a single interchange providing access to Paekākāriki exists between Pāuatahanui and Mackays Crossing.
