= State Highway 58 (New Zealand) =

Road in New Zealand

State Highway 58

Route information
- Maintained by NZ Transport Agency Waka Kotahi
- Length: 15.2 km (9.4 mi)

Major junctions
- East end: SH 2 (Western Hutt Road) at Haywards
- SH 1 (Transmission Gully Motorway) at Pāuatahanui
- West end: SH 59 at Paremata

Location
- Country: New Zealand

Highway system
- New Zealand state highways; Motorways and expressways; List
← SH 57	→ SH 59

State Highway 58 (SH 58) is a New Zealand state highway in the Wellington Region linking the Hutt Valley to Porirua City.

== Route ==
The two-lane highway covers 15.2 kilometres (9.4 mi) and connects State Highway 2 from a junction at Haywards north of Lower Hutt to State Highway 59 at Paremata, north of the Porirua City Centre. The road traverses the steep Haywards Hill on the western side of the Hutt Valley, continues through Judgeford to an interchange with the Transmission Gully Motorway (State Highway 1) at Pāuatahanui, and skirts the southern side of the Pauatahanui Inlet of Porirua Harbour and the suburb of Whitby.

== History ==
The road was first formed during the 1870s. From the 1940s to the 1970s there were proposals for a railway line, the Haywards–Plimmerton Line, via this route.

In June 2010 a road assessment programme found that the Haywards Hill road was amongst the worst in the Wellington region, scoring only 2 out a possible 5. In November 2014 upgrades costing $30 million were announced, with $2.5 million of work starting immediately. Construction of an elevated interchange at the intersection of SH2 and SH58 at Haywards began in 2015 and was completed in 2017 for a cost of $42 million. The project included a new park and ride car park at the adjacent Manor Park Railway Station and a pedestrian footbridge across SH2 to replace an existing underpass. Further safety improvements are under construction and estimated to be complete by 2023. These include building median and road-side safety barriers, two new roundabouts at the intersections of Flightys Road and Moonshine Road identified as having high crash statistics, and widening parts of the road to four lanes.

== Major junctions ==
All exits are unnumbered.

Territorial authority	Location	km	mi	Destinations	Notes
Lower Hutt City	Manor Park	0.0	0.0	SH 2 north (Western Hutt Road) – Upper Hutt, Masterton; Manor Park Road – Manor Park; SH 2 south (Western Hutt Road) – Lower Hutt, Wellington	SH 58 begins
Porirua City	Pāuatahanui	9.6	6.0	SH 1 south (Transmission Gully Motorway) – Wellington; SH 1 north (Transmission Gully Motorway) – Palmerston North	
Porirua City	Pāuatahanui	10.0	6.2	Paekākāriki Hill Road – Pāuatahanui	
Porirua City	Whitby	13.6	8.5	Postgate Drive – Whitby Shops	
Porirua City	Paremata	15.1	9.4	Paremata Crescent – Papakowhai	
Porirua City	Paremata	15.2	9.4	SH 59 south – Porirua, Wellington; Paremata railway station park & ride SH 59 north (Mana Esplanade) – Plimmerton, Paekākāriki, SH 1 north at Mackays Crossing	SH 58 ends

== See also ==
- List of New Zealand state highways
