= State Highway 59 (New Zealand) =

Road in New Zealand

State Highway 59

Route information
- Maintained by NZ Transport Agency
- Length: 26.2 km (16.3 mi)
- Existed: 2021–present

Major junctions
- North end: SH 1 (Kāpiti Expressway/Transmission Gully Motorway) at Mackays Crossing
- SH 58 east (Paremata Road) at Paremata
- South end: SH 1 south (Johnsonville–Porirua Motorway) at Linden

Location
- Country: New Zealand
- Primary destinations: Paekākāriki, Pukerua Bay, Paremata, Porirua

Highway system
- New Zealand state highways; Motorways and expressways; List
← SH 58	→ SH 60

State Highway 59 (SH 59) is a New Zealand state highway in the Wellington Region linking Mackays Crossing (near Paekākāriki) to Linden. The numbering came into existence on 7 December 2021, prior to the opening of the Transmission Gully Motorway, and consists of the former route of State Highway 1 between Mackays Crossing and Linden.

== Route ==
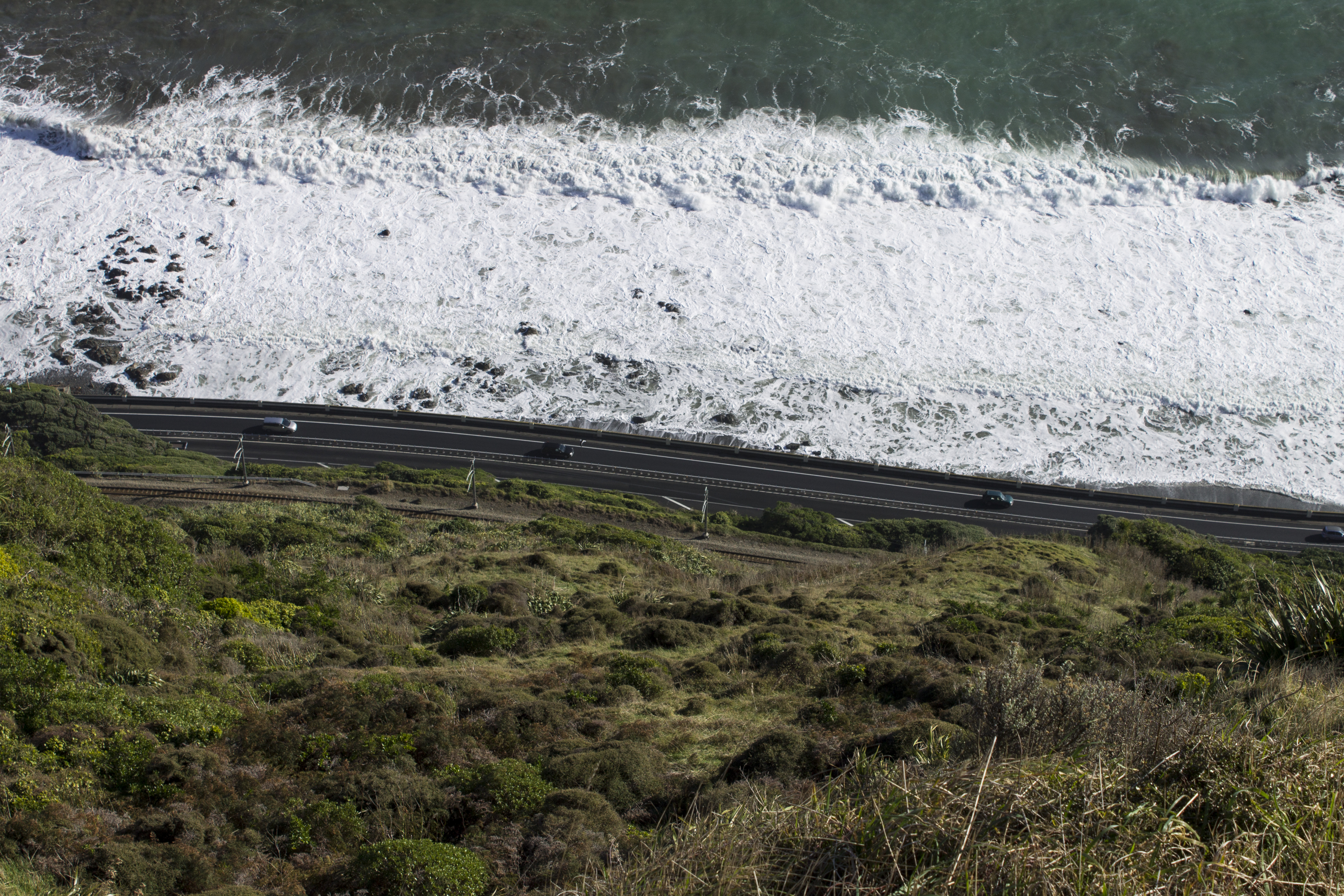
Centennial Highway between Paekākāriki and Pukerua Bay

State Highway 59 leaves State Highway 1 at the Mackays Crossing Interchange, the point where the northern end of the Transmission Gully Motorway meets the southern end of the Kāpiti Expressway. The route heads to the south-west and passes through Paekākāriki, before travelling along the Centennial Highway through to Pukerua Bay along a narrow strip of land between the Paekākāriki Escarpment and the Tasman Sea, shared with the North Island Main Trunk railway line. After Pukerua Bay, the route becomes a dual carriageway through to Plimmerton, before narrowing to a single carriageway through Mana. South of Mana, the route crosses over the Porirua Harbour at Paremata; here, the route intersects with the western terminus of State Highway 58 at a roundabout.

From the SH 58 junction, the route once more becomes a dual carriageway and travels between the Porirua Harbour and the suburb of Papakōwhai to reach the Porirua city centre, becoming the Johnsonville-Porirua Motorway at a point 500 metres (550 yd) south of the Mungavin Avenue interchange. A short distance south, as the route enters Wellington City in the northern suburb of Linden, the southern end of the Transmission Gully Motorway carrying SH 1 merges on to the Johnsonville-Porirua Motorway. The SH 59 designation ends at this point, with the Johnsonville-Porirua Motorway carrying the SH 1 designation as it continues south to Johnsonville and Wellington.

== History ==
The original route north of Wellington known as the Centennial Highway from Ngauranga to Paekākāriki was started in 1936 and opened on 4 November 1939. The Centennial Highway project involved an upgrade of the Ngauranga Gorge road and provided a new route from Paremata to Paekākāriki, bypassing the winding road along the southern harbour edge from Paremata to Pāuatahanui (now part of State Highway 58) and the tortuous narrow winding Paekākāriki Hill Road between Pāuatahanui and Paekākāriki. It followed a new route, bridging the narrow channel between Paremata and the Mana isthmus and following the eastern edge of the Taupō swamp north of Plimmerton before climbing to the Pukerua Bay saddle and descending to follow the coastline to Paekākāriki.

During the 1950s and 1960s, the route south of Porirua was replaced in stages by the Johnsonville–Porirua Motorway.

In Porirua city, in the 1990s, the road was widened to four lanes and realigned to ease curves from just south of Pukerua Bay to Mana. In 2005–2006, the route through Mana was upgraded with extra lanes to provide dual carriageways through Mana during peak periods and the installation of traffic lights to regulate cross traffic. A second bridge was added to expand to four lanes the connection of the Mana isthmus to Paremata.

Originally part of State Highway 1, the route was renumbered State Highway 59 on 7 December 2021, shortly before the opening of the Transmission Gully Motorway. SH 1 was shifted to the Transmission Gully Motorway to reflect its purpose as the new main route north of Wellington, with the existing route remaining a state highway due to its strategic importance to the regional transport network.

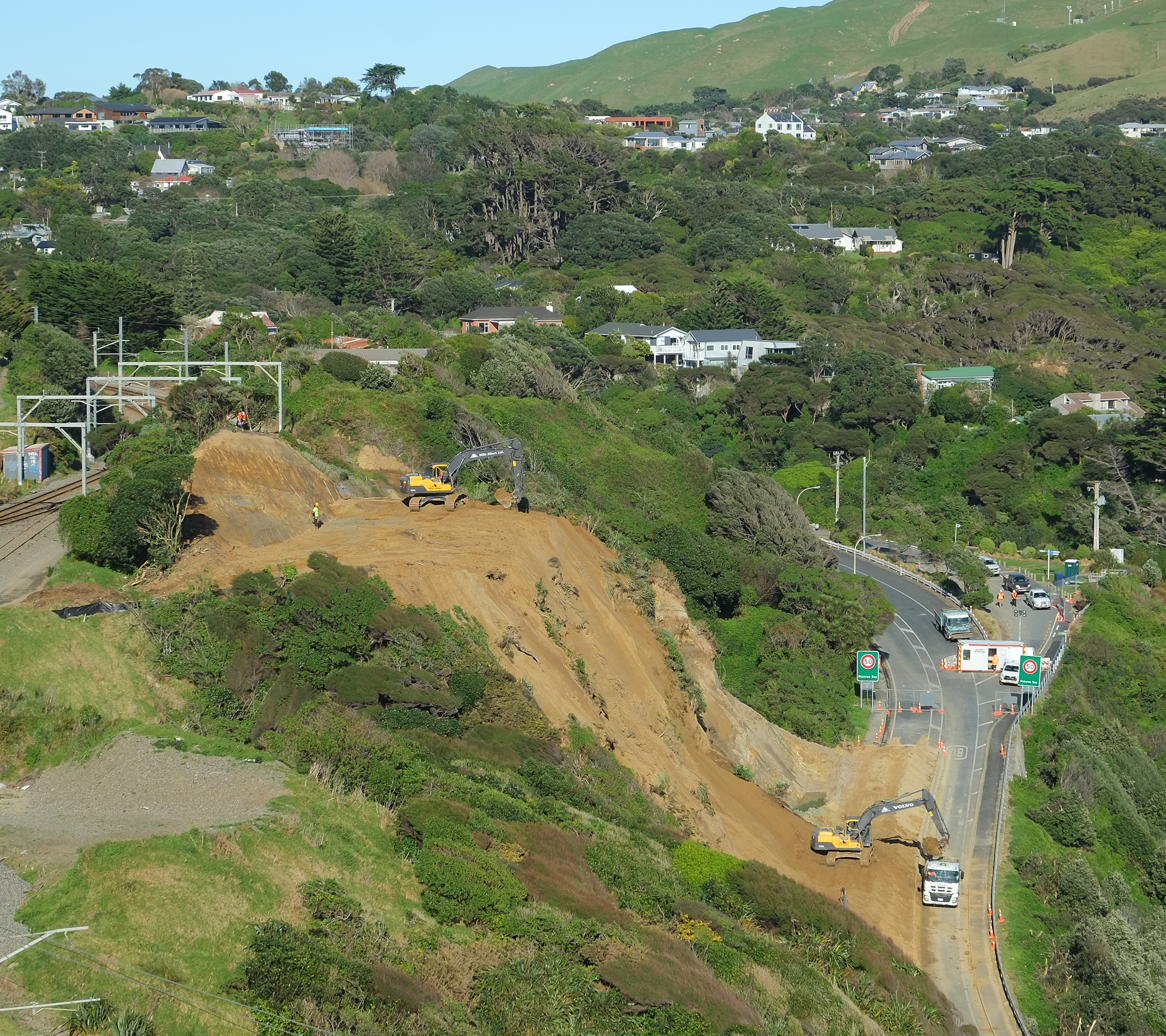
Diggers clearing a slip on SH 59 north of Pukerua Bay in 2022

The stretch along the coast between Paekākāriki and Pukerua Bay is prone to slips, part of the reason the inland route through Transmission Gully was preferred for greater resiliency to natural disasters. In its first year of being State Highway 59, the highway was closed twice due to weather events causing flooding and slips, the third time the coastal road was closed in the space of a year.

== Major junctions ==
All exits are unnumbered.

Territorial authority	Location	km	mi	Destinations	Notes
Kāpiti Coast District	Mackays Crossing	0.0	0.0	SH 1 south (Transmission Gully Motorway) - Wellington (Emerald Glen Road) (Whareroa Road) - Whareroa Farm	SH 59 begins 40°58′15″S 174°58′59″E
Kāpiti Coast District	Mackays Crossing	0.1	0.062	(Whareroa Road) – Queen Elizabeth Park; To SH 1 north (Kāpiti Expressway) - Paraparaumu, Palmerston North	
Kāpiti Coast District	Paekākāriki	1.9	1.2	SH 1 north (Transmission Gully Motorway to Kāpiti Expressway) - Paraparaumu, Palmerston North	Access to northbound SH 1 and access from southbound SH 1 (via Paekākāriki Link Road) only
Kāpiti Coast District	Paekākāriki	3.5	2.2	(Paekākāriki Hill Road) – Pāuatahanui (Beach Road) – Paekākāriki; Paekākāriki railway station	
Porirua City	Plimmerton	17.1	10.6	(James Street/Ulric Street) - Plimmerton Estate; Plimmerton railway station	
Porirua City	Paremata	19.8	12.3	SH 58 (Paremata Road) – Whitby, Hutt Valley; Paremata railway station park & ride	41°06′21″S 174°52′05″E
Porirua City	Papakōwhai	21.9	13.6	(Whitford Brown Avenue) – Papakōwhai	
Porirua City	Porirua CBD	23.3	14.5	(Parumoana Street) – Porirua City Centre, Titahi Bay	Southbound exit and northbound entrance
Porirua City	Porirua CBD	24.1	15.0	(Mungavin Avenue) – Porirua City Centre, Titahi Bay, Tawa; Porirua railway station park & ride	Johnsonville-Porirua Motorway begins 500 m (550 yd) south of this junction
Wellington City	Linden	26.2	16.3	SH 1 north (Transmission Gully Motorway) - Palmerston North	SH 59 ends 41°09′19″S 174°50′22″E Northbound exit and southbound entrance Johnsonville-Porirua Motorway continues south as SH 1
Incomplete access
