= Johnsonville–Porirua Motorway =

Road in New Zealand

Johnsonville–Porirua Motorway
- State Highway 1 / State Highway 59

Route information
- Length: 11 km (6.8 mi)
- Existed: 23 December 1950–present

Major junctions
- North end: Porirua
- South end: Johnsonville

Location
- Country: New Zealand
- Primary destinations: Tawa, Churton Park, Grenada North

Highway system
- New Zealand state highways; Motorways and expressways; List

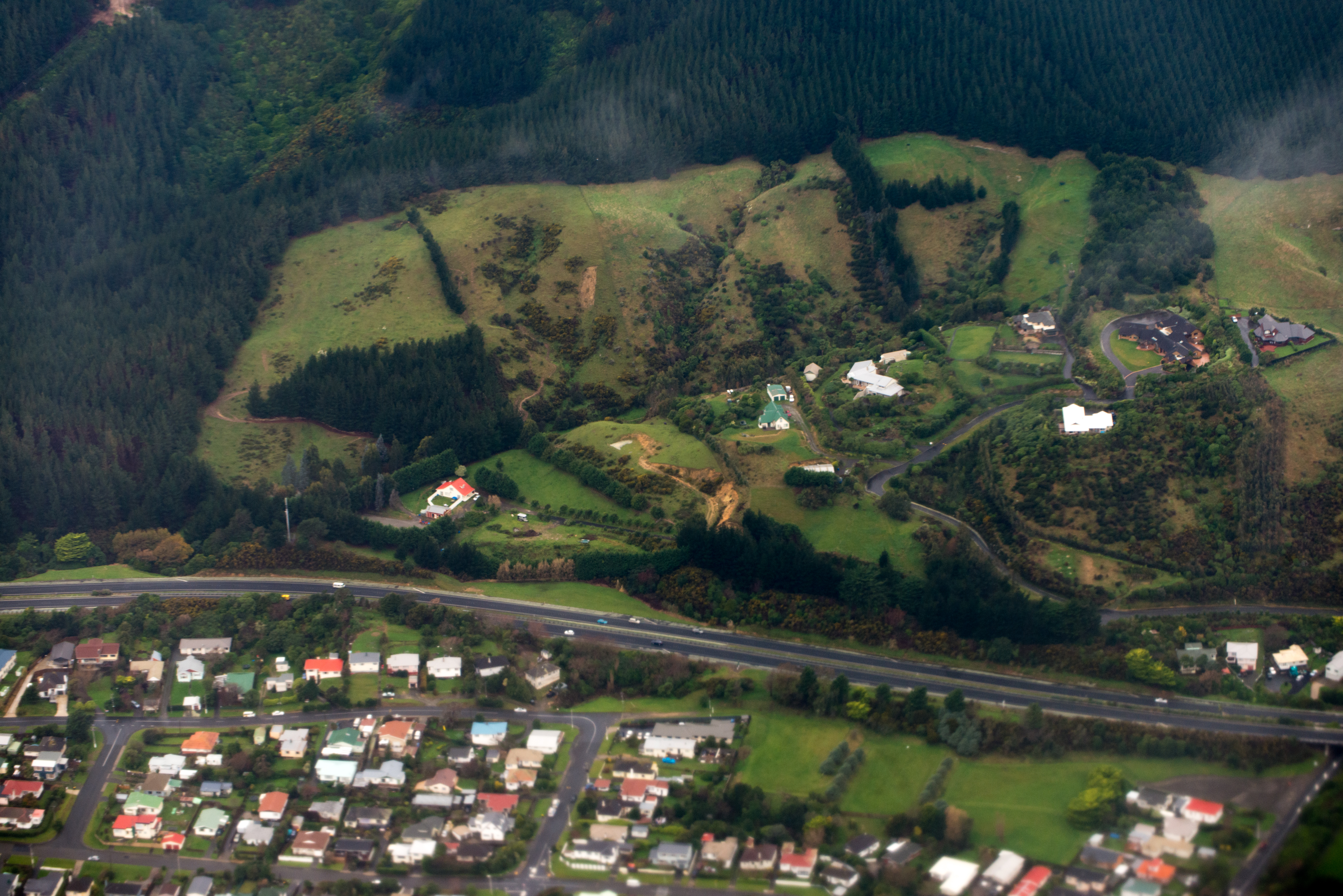
Aerial view of the Johnsonville-Porirua Motorway in southeastern Linden

The Johnsonville–Porirua Motorway is a motorway in Wellington, New Zealand. The majority of the motorway forms part of State Highway 1, the main route of traffic in and out of the city, with the northernmost 2.1 km (1.3 mi), formerly part of SH 1 until 7 December 2021, designated as State Highway 59. Completed in the 1950s, it was New Zealand's first motorway.

The motorway runs from Johnsonville, in the north of Wellington City proper, to Porirua. It is approximately 11 kilometres long with moderate grades. At its southern end, it connects to the Wellington Urban Motorway through the Johnsonville bypass and Centennial Highway, which runs along Ngauranga Gorge — Centennial Highway is not considered motorway, meeting most but not all of the criteria. The motorway has a connection to the Transmission Gully Motorway in Linden, 2.1 km (1.3 mi) from its northern end.

== Construction and completion ==
The motorway was constructed using the cut and fill technique where material removed from cuttings is used to fill gullies. Some additional material was needed and excavated in Linden from the area that is now the northern of the Tawa College playing fields to the east of the motorway.

The first section of the motorway, running for three miles (5 km) from Johnsonville to Takapu Road at the southern edge of Tawa, was opened on Saturday 23 December 1950. It bypassed a winding two-lane road now called Middleton Road, through Glenside; part of the Old Porirua Road. This section was New Zealand's first motorway. The southern end of the motorway was located at the point where the Johnsonville northbound on-ramp and southbound off-ramp meet the current motorway. The northern end was located at the point where the Takapu Road northbound off-ramp and southbound on-ramp meet the present motorway.

The second section, opened about 1956, runs for four miles (6 km) from Takapu Road to Porirua. It bypassed narrow winding sections of road through Tawa, the Tawa town centre, and Kenepuru. It cut through already planned and surveyed subdivisions on the eastern side of Tawa. Land was reserved for a planned interchange at Collins Avenue in Linden, Tawa, but the construction of this interchange was deferred as a cost saving measure. With the completion of the second section, the northern end of the motorway was shifted to a point 500 metres south of Mungavin Avenue in Porirua. At the time, there was a road intersection just north of this point connecting SH 1 to Kenepuru Drive with a level crossing over the railway line and bridge over the stream, and other accessways.

The four-lane Johnsonville bypass connecting Ngauranga Gorge to the south end of the Johnsonville-Porirua motorway was completed in the late 1950s soon after the completion of the extension to Porirua. The bypass took traffic away from the congested Johnsonville Road and the Johnsonville town centre. Built on the side of the steep hill above the town centre, this section is narrower than the motorway north of Johnsonville and built without a wide medium strip and shoulders. Wooden crash barriers were used to separate northbound and southbound traffic and prevent northbound cars leaving the road on the left-hand side. These barriers have since been replaced with steel barriers. With the completion of the Johnsonville bypass, the southern end of the motorway was shifted to a point fifty metres north of the point where the northbound off-ramp from Ngauranga Gorge leaves State Highway 1 (SH 1) and remains at this point.

Construction of the Mungavin Avenue, Titahi Bay Road intersection in the 1960s enabled the connection of the Johnsonville–Porirua Motorway to the then new four-lane Porirua-Paremata expressway. The work included building a two-lane flyover over the railway line and Porirua stream to connect Mungavin Avenue to the newly constructed four-lane Titahi Bay Road. At a later date, a second flyover was constructed to provide four-lanes. The flyovers eliminated the level crossing and bridge over the stream to the south. In 1989, the Mungavin Avenue intersection was replaced with a grade-separated roundabout interchange, with State Highway 1 passing under the interchange. However, with the completion of this interchange, the northern end of the Johnsonville-Porirua motorway was not relocated and remains in the same location 500 metres south of Mungavin Avenue as SH 1 north of this point does not meet full motorway standards.

In July 2016, work began on the construction of the Linden Interchange, between Collins Avenue, Linden, and Porirua, to connect the Johnsonville-Porirua motorway to the Transmission Gully Motorway, then under construction itself. On 7 December 2021, shortly before the opening of the Transmission Gully Motorway, SH 1 was shifted to the newer motorway with the section of the Johnsonville–Porirua Motorway north of this point redesignated as SH 59.

== Special features ==
Much of the first section between Johnsonville and Takapu Road used the former alignment of the North Island Main Trunk railway built in the 1880s by the Wellington and Manawatu Railway Company and bypassed by the Tawa Flat deviation built in the 1930s. The north-bound entrance to the motorway from Johnsonville uses a cutting originally cut for the railway.

When the motorway first opened in 1950, the towering Belmont railway viaduct, which bridged a deep gully at Paparangi, could be seen from the motorway to the east of the new motorway embankment on the straight north of Johnsonville. The original wooden trestle structure built by Wellington and Manawatu Railway Company was the largest of its kind in New Zealand, standing 125 ft (38 m) high and 341 ft (102 m) long. It was replaced by a steel viaduct in 1903. The derelict and rusting structure was demolished with explosives by Territorial Army engineers on 15 December 1951. The abutments can still be distinguished.

The Takapu Road interchange was the first motorway interchange in New Zealand.

A feature of the first section, built on the eastern side of the Tawa Valley, is the split level construction with the northbound lanes built at a lower level than the southbound lanes over part of the route. This reduced construction costs and largely eliminated headlight glare from oncoming traffic. However, the grassed medium bank between the north and south-bound lanes proved difficult and expensive to maintain, requiring lane closure to mow the grass, and the second section of the motorway and subsequent motorways were built on a single level.

The Johnsonville–Porirua Motorway was the first road in New Zealand to use white on green signage. Initially, green signage was restricted to motorways so that motorists could easily distinguish a motorway from other highways. After the establishment of Transit New Zealand in 1989 the use of green signage was extended to the entire state highway network to conform with Australian usage.

A feature of both the first and second sections of the motorway was the use of the motorway to form a series of dams on the eastern side of the valley to reduce the flooding risk in the Tawa valley. The motorway created dams across side valleys and gullies with small diameter spun concrete culverts used to control the release of water from the side streams into the main stream. This reduced peak water flow and flood risk during heavy rain events. A proposal to widen the motorway to the east to provide an extra lane will risk reducing the amount of water that can be stored and may lead to flooding of the motorway.

== Noise problem ==
Traffic on the motorway has increased considerably since the 1950s and now creates a significant noise problem for some homes near the motorway and adds to the general noise in the valley. Traffic is now well above the level where noise mitigation would be required if this was a new motorway construction or above levels where noise mitigation would be required due to increased traffic in other countries. Transit New Zealand has resisted noise mitigating using the dubious argument of "existing use" despite the significant traffic increase and most of the homes existing before the motorway opened.

== Interchanges ==
All exits are unnumbered.

Territorial authority	Location	km	mi	Destinations	Notes
Porirua City	Porirua CBD	0.0	0.0	Mungavin Avenue/Titahi Bay Road – Eastern Porirua, Tawa & Elsdon, Titahi Bay; Porirua railway station park & ride	Northern terminus 500 m (550 yd) south of this junction SH 59 continues north to Mackays Crossing via Plimmerton, Pukerua Bay and Paekākāriki
Wellington City	Linden	2.1	1.3	SH 1 north (Transmission Gully Motorway) – Palmerston North	Northbound exit and southbound entrance Southern terminus of SH 59 and designation change to SH 1
Wellington City	Grenada North	5.6	3.5	Takapu Road – Redwood, Tawa, Linden, Greenacres, Grenada North	
Wellington City	Glenside	8.2	5.1	Grenada Drive/Westchester Drive – Glenside, Churton Park, Grenada Village	
Wellington City	Johnsonville	10.0	6.2	Moorefield Road - Johnsonville, Khandallah	Southbound exit and northbound entrance
Wellington City	Johnsonville	10.9	6.8	Johnsonville Road - Johnsonville	Southern terminus SH 1 (Centennial Highway) continues south to Wellington via Ngauranga Northbound exit and southbound entrance
Incomplete access; Route transition

== See also ==
- List of motorways and expressways in New Zealand
