= Haywards–Plimmerton line =

Proposed railway in Wellington, New Zealand

The Haywards–Plimmerton line was a railway development proposed several times between 1879 and the 1960s to connect the Hutt Valley and Porirua areas of Wellington via Haywards.

== 1879 proposal ==
The route was one of three options for a proposed Hutt Valley–Waikanae route, which was to be the main route out of Wellington in 1879, although when built by the Wellington and Manawatu Railway Company (WMR) the line that became part of the North Island Main Trunk (NIMT) north of Wellington went via Johnsonville (the present Johnsonville Line).

== 20th century proposals ==
In the 1940s to 1960s, a rail link from the Hutt Valley to Porirua was proposed for expected residential and industrial development in the Pauatahanui–Judgeford area at the head of the Pauatahanui Arm of the Porirua Harbour. This link was to follow the route of the present Paremata to Haywards Road (SH58) and required a tunnel. This proposed link was regarded a long-term project not justified in the immediate future and was abandoned in the 1970s.

== Routes out of Wellington ==
In 1878 a 61-mile Wellington–Foxton railway was included in Public Works Department estimates, so in 1879 PWD surveyors ran three trial lines for the Wellington-Foxton railway. No 2 line surveyed by Climie via Johnsonville followed the coach route, and was eventually chosen. No 1 line surveyed by Wink and Hales which went from Upper Hutt to Waikanae via Akatarawa required two tunnels, a bridge over the Hutt River, a horseshoe curve to Bluff Creek Valley (now Reikorangi), and reached a height of 1560 feet above sea level, higher even than the Wairarapa Line. The line would have steep gradients of between 1 in 30 and 1 in 40, but was seriously considered, perhaps as there was millable timber in the area.

The proposed No 3 line followed the Western Hutt Road, left the Wellington–Masterton railway 12 miles 55 chains from Wellington (approximately 1.2 km south of the present day SH 2/SH 58 intersection), and climbed Haywards Hill to the saddle. It followed the road route to the settlement of Pauatahanui, then climbed the left bank of the Horokiri Stream valley (what is now the Transmission Gully route), went under the saddle with a 27 chain (540 m) tunnel, and at 23 miles reached the existing route of the NIMT at McKay’s Homestead (now McKay’s Crossing of the NIMT). "The Haywards route .... was quickly dropped, although it is still on the map today (1972) as a possible connecting link between the suburban districts of Porirua and the Hutt Valley to serve the new urban developments now taking place". This proposed route would have avoided the difficult Pukerua Bay–Paekākāriki coastal section of the NIMT. The 20th-century proposals joined the NIMT further south near Plimmerton or Mana.

== Hutt–Porirua link ==
In 1946, the Haywards–Plimmerton line was included in a 10-year plan for public works, and was allowed for in the rerouting of the Taita–Silverstream section of the Hutt Valley Line. Justification was expected large-scale development in the Pauatahanui–Judgeford area, with a new town, and expected industrial development to rival the Hutt Valley, possibly requiring a two- or three-mile spur line from Plimmerton.

In 1957, a new line via Haywards was not expected to be built in 20–30 years. But in 1967 there were proposals for a new city at Pauatahanui, including a Horokiwi Valley Industrial Area requiring a new 2-mile (industrial) spur line. By 1969, the New Zealand Railways Department (NZR) projects committee was considering rail proposals for a new town with a population of 75,000 and two industrial areas (400 acres near Plimmerton and 300 acres on the Haywards side). Options were an electrified double-track 9.25 miles long costing $23 million with a 3.25-mile tunnel through Haywards, or a spur line with a 12-chain (0.15 mile) tunnel costing $2m (2 miles) or $3m (3 miles).

A Wellington Regional Authority report of December 1971 on a new town at Pauatahanui saw the population of Pauatahanui growing from 4100 (1971) to 45,000 (1986), but said that the existing Whitby development could be seen as an extension of the existing Paremata–Plimmerton development rather than the start of a new Pauatahanui development.

Two NZR estimates in 1974 were (1) $73½ to $75½ million for a double-track electrified line and tunnel or (2) $15 to $40½ million for a non-electrified single-track line and tunnel and a small goods yard.

In 1976, the proposals included an alternative route for the NIMT via the Horokiwi Valley to bypass the existing unstable coastal section and provide a direct connection from the Hutt Valley to the NIMT, though the rail route via Pukerua Bay and Paekākāriki would be retained for commuter services.

But by 1978 NZR decided that the project was not expected to proceed, and some land in Acheron Rd, Paremata, was transferred to the Porirua City Council, which was already using it for a children’s park. While subdivision at Whitby was advancing towards Pauatahanui and Judgeford, the scale of development was less than predicted. And industrial development in the Hutt Valley decreased with New Zealand's decreasing barriers to trade, as did industrial rail traffic with the removal of protection of rail freight from road competition.

The project was originally (1946) called the Plimmerton–Taita railway or Taita–Plimmerton–Pauatahanui railway. Other names were Dolly Varden–Haywards; Manor Park–Paremata, Mana–Haywards, and Manor Park–Plimmerton railway (Dolly Varden was the earlier name for Mana).
