= Kāpiti Expressway =

Road in New Zealand

Kapiti Expressway
- State Highway 1
- Map showing the Kāpiti Expressway in red, and the proposed Horwhenua District extension (north of Ōtaki to North of Levin) in blue.

Route information
- Maintained by NZ Transport Agency Waka Kotahi
- Length: 31 km (19 mi)
- History: 24 February 2017–present

Major junctions
- North end: SH 1 north, north of Ōtaki
- South end: SH 1 south (Transmission Gully Motorway) / SH 59 south (Whareroa Road) at Mackays Crossing

Location
- Country: New Zealand
- Primary destinations: Ōtaki; Peka Peka; Waikanae; Paraparaumu; Raumati South

Highway system
- New Zealand state highways; Motorways and expressways; List

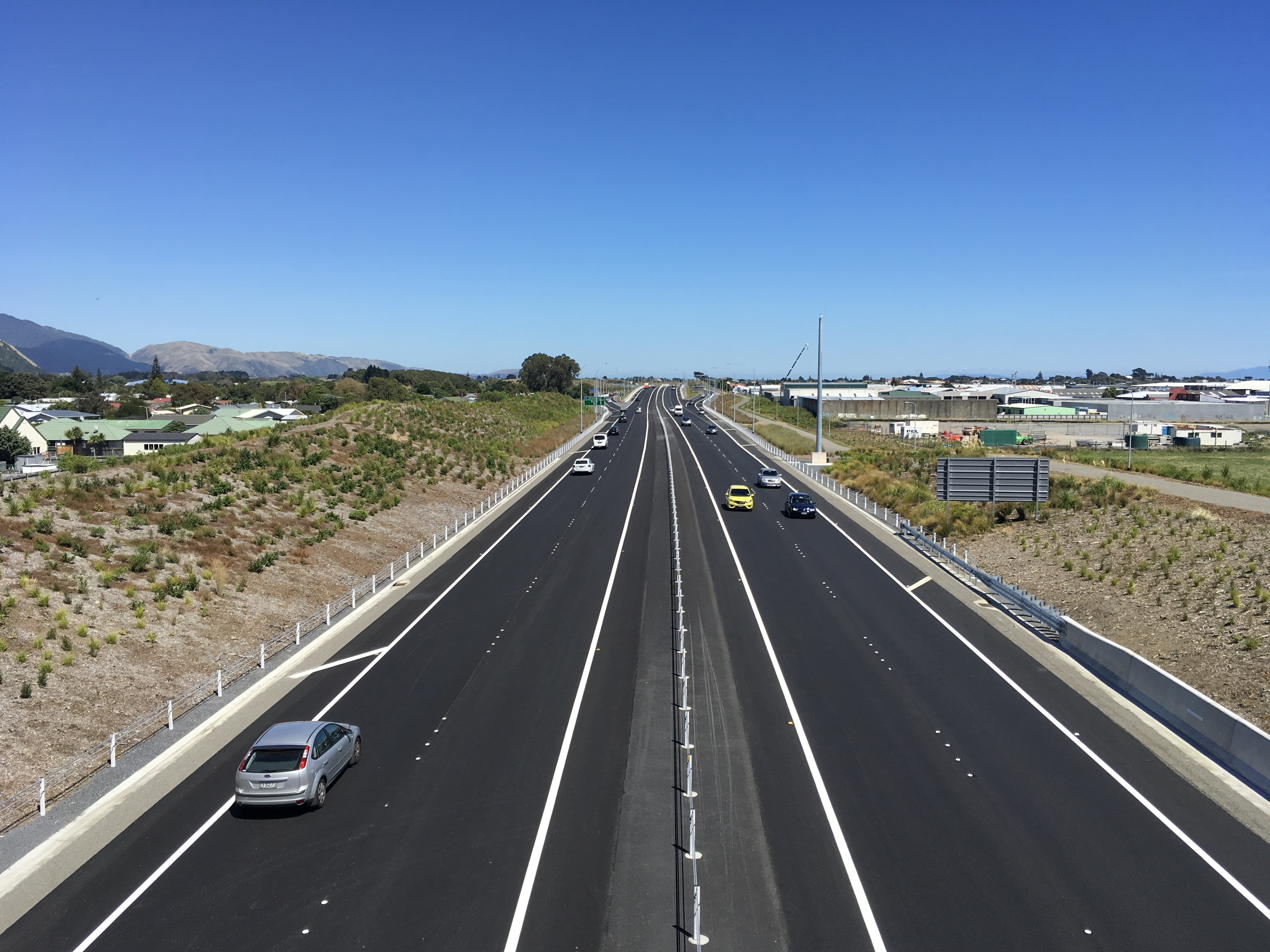
Looking south along the Kāpiti Expressway towards the Kapiti Road interchange

The Kāpiti Expressway is a four-lane grade-separated expressway on New Zealand's State Highway 1 route through the Kāpiti Coast north of Wellington. From the northernmost terminus of the Transmission Gully Motorway at Mackays Crossing just north of Paekākāriki, it extends northwards 31 km (19 mi) to just north of Ōtaki, bypassing the former two-lane route through Raumati South, Paraparaumu, Waikanae, Peka Peka, Te Horo, and Ōtaki.

== Names ==
Waka Kotahi web site name the first section (finished 2017) as McKays to Peka Peka (M2PP) and the second section (finished 2022) as Peka Peka to Ōtaki (PP2Ō). These appear as project names and in all material provided publicly. These documents do not use the name Kāpiti Expressway.

Signage in the vicinity of the Expressway shows "EWY North (or South)" and a list of destinations, "expressway" at the start of on ramps, or "expressway ends" at the end of off ramps. The word Kāpiti does not appear in any of this signage.

The name Kāpiti Expressway only seems to appear in newspapers articles, apparently as a way to simplify identification to readers when writing about the expressway through the Kapiti District.

The expressway operates only in the territorial area of the Kapiti District Council. As part of a state highway (SH1) the controlling authority for the expressway is Waka Kotahi - New Zealand Transport Agency

When the second section was officially opened, tangata whenua gifted the name Te Ara Tuku a Te Rauparaha. This name was received at that opening ceremony. It is not currently clear whether that name was intended to apply to the second section or to the whole expressway from Mackay to Ōtaki.

== Construction ==
The section from just south of Mackays Crossing to just south of Poplar Avenue at Raumati South was completed in 2007 with the completion of the Mackays Crossing interchange and rail overbridge, bypassing the existing rail level crossing. The previously constructed four-lane section from Mackays Crossing to Poplar Avenue was upgraded during 2016 and early 2017 to provide an improved road surface. This section of road is constructed on an old peat swamp and develops an uneven surface over time.

Work on the Raumati to Peka Peka section started in December 2013. The official opening ceremony was held on 16 February 2017, and the expressway opened to traffic in the early hours of 24 February 2017, some three months ahead of the original scheduled date. Some works, including the final layer of asphalt on some sections and roundabouts at the Peka Peka and Poplar Avenue interchanges, took until mid-2017 to complete.

The first sod was turned on the 13 km Peka Peka to Ōtaki northern extension on 6 July 2017, and it opened to traffic on 22 December 2022.

== Controversies ==
After 18 months it was apparent the road needed repairs. 49 kilometres of lanes were found to be leaking, due to the new type of low-sound asphalt that was used for its construction. This caused the road to crack and sink in many areas. When the New Zealand Transport Agency (NZTA) were asked, under an Official Information Act request, to provide information on the cause of the issues encountered they declined.

In July 2017 the Transport Minister Simon Bridges announced that a full Peka Peka Interchange would need to be built to connect the Waikanae North, Peka Peka and Te Horo Communities to the Kāpiti Expressway. In January 2019, the NZTA announced plans to stop this project. An initiative was formed named "Finish our Road" focusing on the safety implications because higher traffic on local roads, impact on ratepayers subject to higher maintenance costs and impact on the rural communities of the Kāpiti Coast. In May 2019, the Kāpiti Coast District Council voted unanimously to back the goals of the initiative to review the business case provided by NZTA and their decision not to build the Peka Peka interchange.

== History ==
The Kāpiti Expressway has been constructed in two sections:

MacKays to Peka Peka (M2PP) was the first section to begin construction. The southern end linked SH 1 just north of Paekākāriki to with a two-lane highway towards Porirua City eventually linking with the four-lane Johnsonville–Porirua Motorway which was constructed in the 1950s. The northern end linked to the existing two-lane SH 1 from Peka Peka north towards Otaki, Levin and beyond.

In March 2022 the Transmission Gully Motorway was opened between MacKays and Linden. This bypassed the two-lane section of SH 1 and the former section became State Highway 59. This section is not officially part of the Kāpiti Expressway.)

The Peka Peka to Ōtaki (PP2Ō) expressway section opened on 23 December 2022. At its official opening on 21 December, Ngati Raukawa gifted the name Te Ara Tuku o Te Rauparaha, in honour of the legendary rangatira memorialised near the church Rangiātea in Ōtaki town.

Construction of a 24 km expressway, Te Pae o Tararua, from north of Ōtaki to north of Levin, began in 2025 and is expected to be completed in 2029.

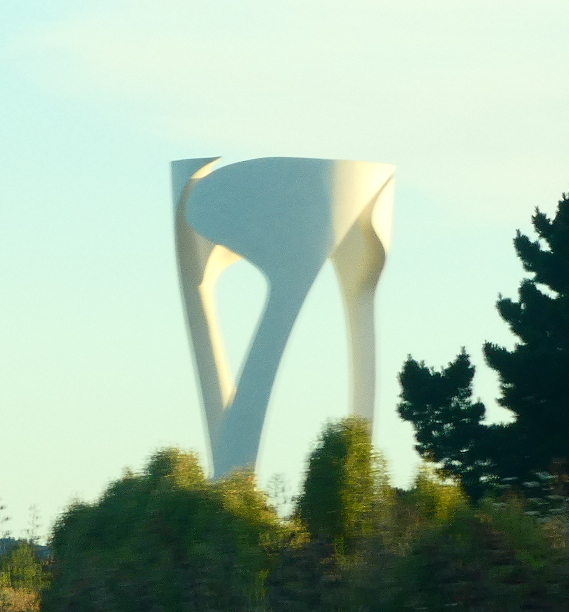
One of the 'gateway' sculptures, in Ōtaki

In 2015 Marco Zeeman proposed placing sculptures of whales at the offramps of Kāpiti Expressway and Transmission Gully, however it did not receive enough funding for this to be done. In February 2023 two white six-metre-tall 'gateway' sculptures in Ōtaki opened near the expressway in order to encourage motorists to visit the town. Each sculpture has three columns which move upwards and join into a circle.

== Exit list ==
All exits are unnumbered.

Location	km	mi	Destinations	Notes
Ōtaki	998.5	620.4	Waitohu Stream bridge	Northern terminus, SH 1 continues north towards Levin
Ōtaki	999.8	621.2	Main Highway – Ōtaki	Southbound exit and northbound entrance
Ōtaki	1,001.7	622.4	Ōtaki River	
Ōtaki	1,002.1	622.7	Ōtaki Gorge Road – Ōtaki	Northbound exit and southbound entrance
Peka Peka	1,012.0	628.8	Peka Peka Road – Peka Peka, Waikanae	Southbound exit and northbound entrance
Waikanae	1,017.0	631.9	Te Moana Road – Waikanae, Waikanae Beach	
Waikanae	1,018.4	632.8	Waikanae River	
Paraparaumu	1,023.0	635.7	Kapiti Road – Paraparaumu, Paraparaumu Beach	
Raumati	1,026.6	637.9	Poplar Avenue – Raumati, Paraparaumu	Northbound exit and southbound entrance
Mackays Crossing	1,030.3	640.2	SH 59 (Whareroa Road) – Queen Elizabeth Park	Southern terminus, SH 1 continues south as Transmission Gully Motorway
1.000 mi = 1.609 km; 1.000 km = 0.621 mi: Incomplete access; Unopened
