= Transmission Gully =

Motorway in New Zealand

Transmission Gully Te Ara Nui o Te Rangihaeata (Māori)
- State Highway 1
- Map of the Transmission Gully motorway

Route information
- Maintained by Ventia on behalf of NZ Transport Agency
- Length: 27 km (17 mi)
- Existed: 30 March 2022–present

Major junctions
- North end: SH 1 north (Kāpiti Expressway) / SH 59 south (Whareroa Road) at Mackays Crossing
- (Paekākāriki Link Road) to SH 59 (Centennial Highway) near Paekākāriki; SH 58 (Paremata-Haywards Road) at Pāuatahanui
- South end: SH 1 south (Johnsonville-Porirua Motorway) / SH 59 north (Johnsonville-Porirua Motorway) at Linden

Location
- Country: New Zealand
- Primary destinations: Paekākāriki; Pāuatahanui; Whitby; Waitangirua; Cannons Creek; Kenepuru; Linden

Highway system
- New Zealand state highways; Motorways and expressways; List

The Transmission Gully motorway (Māori: Te Ara Nui o Te Rangihaeata) is a 27-kilometre-long (17-mile), four-lane motorway running through Transmission Gully north of Wellington, New Zealand; it is part of State Highway 1. Construction began on 8 September 2014. Completion was originally scheduled for April 2020, but contractual negotiations and difficulties resulting from the COVID-19 pandemic caused delays. The motorway was officially opened on 30 March 2022 and opened to public traffic the following day.

== Location ==
Transmission Gully is a chain of steep-sided, isolated valleys running approximately north–south between the Kāpiti Coast and Tawa through hills east of Porirua.

An 1879 proposal for a Haywards–Plimmerton Line railway route north from Wellington envisaged using these valleys but the line was never built.

The gully's name comes from the 110,000-volt transmission line that formerly ran through it. The line, built in 1924, linked Wellington to the Mangahao hydroelectric station near Shannon, and later to the wider North Island transmission grid.

Transmission Gully lies mostly within the boundaries of Porirua, but it is sparsely populated and most of the land is farmland, forest, or scrub. There are some areas with lifestyle blocks, particularly near Pāuatahanui. A property alongside the motorway, owned by economist and philanthropist Gareth Morgan and his wife, features sculptures including a large park bench and a rainbow-coloured bridge which are visible to travellers on the motorway. Transmission Gully is also home to Battle Hill Farm Forest Park.

An archaeological investigation carried out prior to construction of the motorway found evidence of pre-European Māori middens, pits, terraces and pā near the coast at Paekakariki and the Pāuatahanui Inlet. Pre-European Māori and early European settlers preferred to live near the coast, but the bulk of the motorway route is further inland and unlikely to have been permanently occupied.

== Motorway route ==
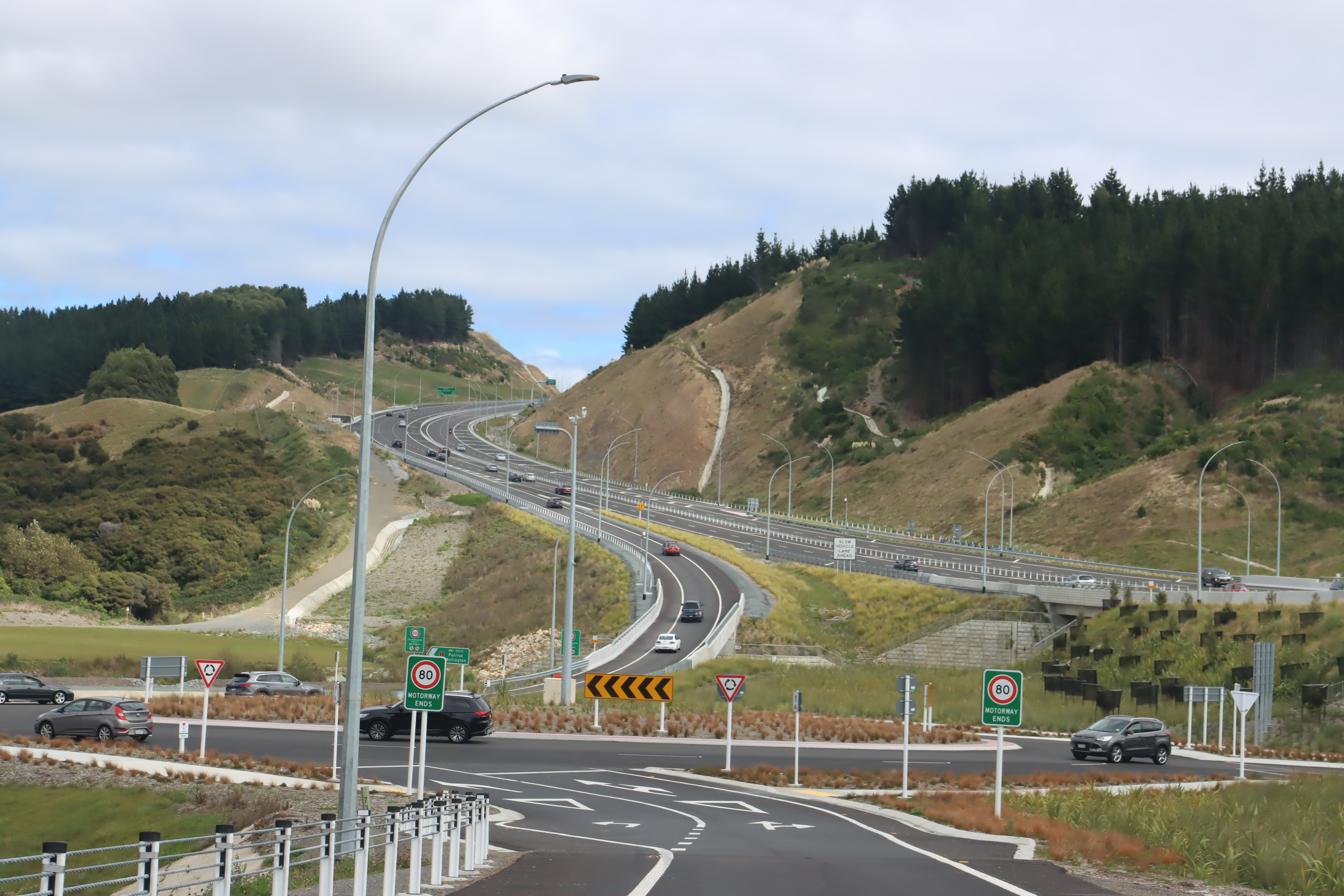
Transmission Gully Motorway, Pāuatahanui exit

A highway connecting the Kāpiti Coast to Pāuatahanui through the Wainui Saddle was first proposed in 1919 by William Hughes Field, the MP for Ōtaki at the time, as one of two alternatives to the steep, narrow and windy Paekakariki Hill Road between Paekākāriki and Pāuatahanui. One of his proposals became the main route north of Wellington from Ngauranga to Paekākāriki through Pukerua Bay, known as Centennial Highway. This route began construction in 1936 and opened on 4 November 1939, with the section north from Pukerua Bay running along a narrow strip of coastline below the Paekakariki escarpment.

In the succeeding years public interest in alternative routes remained, and consideration was still given to constructing a route through the Wainui Saddle as Field had envisaged. A popular rumour persisted for many years that the US Marines stationed on the Kāpiti coast during World War II made an offer to the New Zealand government to build the road, but there is no evidence of the offer having been made.

The Transmission Gully route complements the previous Centennial Highway route (now State Highway 59) along the coast, and provides a new route between the Kāpiti Coast and Wellington. From its northern terminus at Mackays Crossing, the route proceeds a short distance to an interchange providing access to Paekākāriki and Pukerua Bay before rising steeply inland to the Wainui Saddle, and then gently descends through Transmission Gully following the Horokiri Stream to Pāuatahanui, where an interchange with State Highway 58 provides access to and from the Hutt Valley. It continues south around the eastern edge of the Porirua suburbs of Whitby, Waitangirua and Cannons Creek, with an interchange providing access to local roads constructed at the same time as the motorway that link with these suburbs, before crossing the Te Ara a Toa Bridge, a 90-metre-high (300-foot) structure spanning 300 metres (980 feet) across Cannons Creek. A subsequent interchange links to a local road, again constructed along with the motorway, that provides access to Porirua's city centre, before the motorway terminates at Linden on the boundary of Porirua and Wellington City, where it merges on to the older Johnsonville–Porirua Motorway. The length is 27 kilometres (17 miles), with a maximum grade of about 8.3 percent between the Paekākāriki Interchange and the Wainui Saddle.

== Controversy ==
Developing a Transmission Gully road has been a topic of considerable debate in Wellington politics for some time, even as far back as 1919.

Supporters claimed that it would improve access to Wellington city, arguing that the existing coastal route is too congested, is accident-prone, and could be damaged in a serious earthquake. Peter Dunne, former MP for Ohariu, said that "[i]mproving Wellington City's northern access and egress is a vital key to the future economic performance and prosperity of the whole region, and the Transmission Gully highway is a vital link in that chain".

Opponents of Transmission Gully stated that there were better ways to improve access to Wellington. The highway would require an extremely steep gradient on its northernmost end and many opponents considered that it would thus not actually offer any improvement over the existing coastal highway. The route that the highway would have to take is along the major fault line of the region, which would make it at least as earthquake prone as the existing coastal highway.

Some suggested that the existing coastal route should be upgraded, rather than building a completely new route. This was the original recommendation of the Regional Council, and was put forward as the primary alternative to building Transmission Gully. Public submissions to the Council were in favour of Transmission Gully, and the Council changed its stance in response.

Opponents of upgrading the coastal route said that doing so would cause significant disruption to the communities it passes through, whereas Transmission Gully avoids urban areas. The former Mayor of Porirua, Jenny Brash, said that an upgrade would generate large numbers of complaints from Porirua residents, and would therefore have difficulty receiving resource consent. Others, such as the Green Party and the lobby group Option 3, believed that the money would be better spent on improving Wellington's public transport, particularly the existing rail line. They argued that the original choice between building Transmission Gully or upgrading the coastal route was a false dichotomy, and that in reality neither option was necessary or desirable.

=== Cost ===
Some opponents of the Transmission Gully project believed that its overall cost was too high, and that the region had insufficient funds to spend on it. Then Mayor of Wellington, Kerry Prendergast, described the project as "unaffordable". It was suggested that making Transmission Gully a toll road would help solve this problem, but tolls might discourage drivers from using the new route and would cover only a fraction of the funds necessary to build the highway.

In May 2012, Julie Anne Genter, the Greens' spokeswoman on transport, described the motorway as incurring costs of $1 billion when the official business case benefits were $600 million, in order to ease congestion for an unlikely projected growth of 1500 vehicles per day. In February 2020 it was announced that the expected cost of $850m had been increased by another $191m. In March 2021 the road was reported to cost a projected $1.25 billion by its then-expected opening date in September 2021, and would not include a planned extra merge lane at the Linden interchange to relieve congestion.

== Construction ==
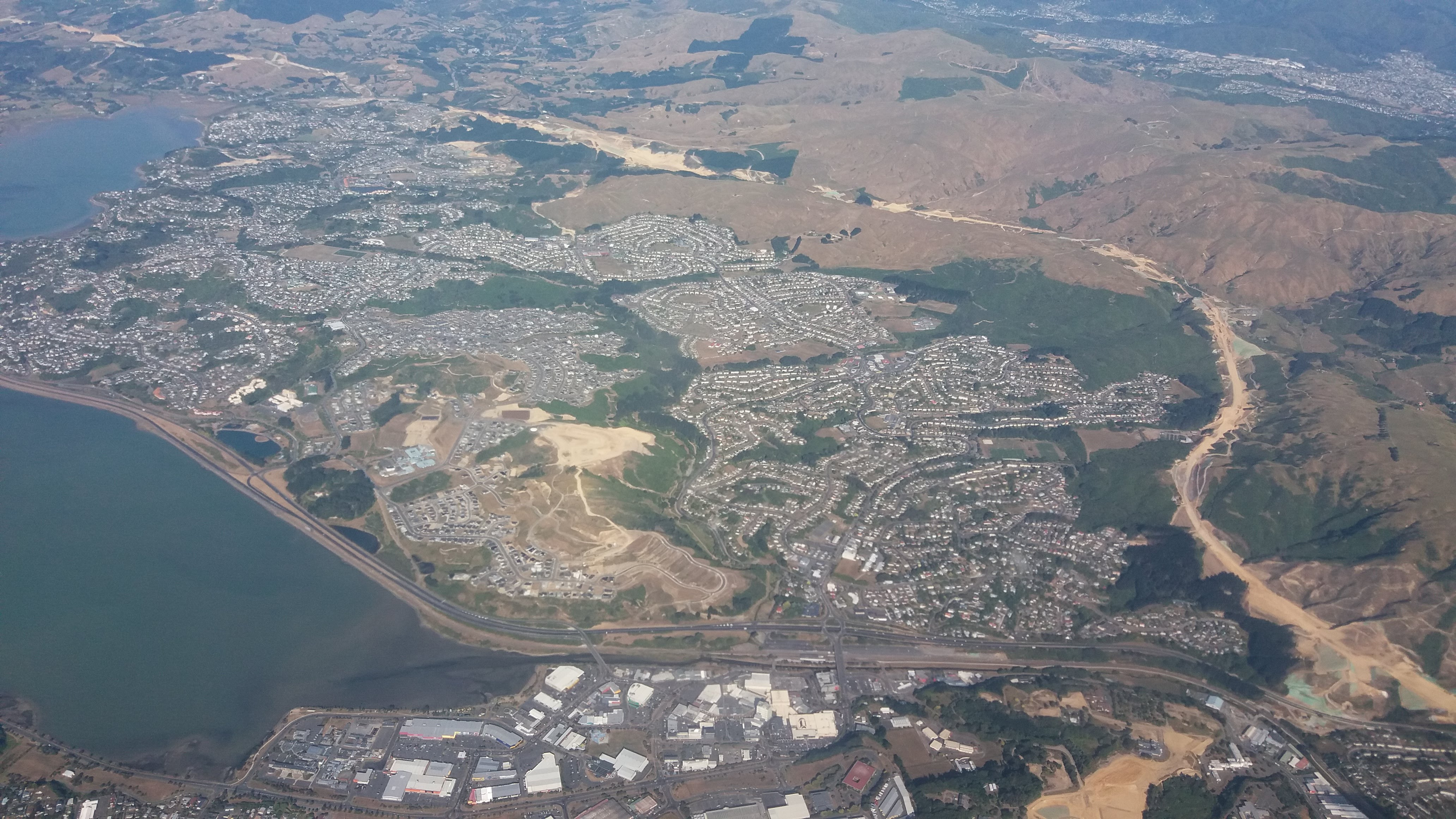
Construction of the motorway, east of Porirua, in December 2017

Although first proposed in 1919, it was only late in the first decade of the 21st century that serious steps were taken towards construction. The Greater Wellington Regional Council, in preparing its Western Corridor Plan, initially rejected Transmission Gully as unaffordable, preferring to upgrade the existing coastal route, but changed its position after public consultation.

In 2009 Steven Joyce was Minister of Transport in the Fifth National Government, and was lobbied by MPs Peter Dunne and Nathan Guy for Transmission Gully as part of the Levin to Airport Road of National Significance. It had been proposed for years, but delayed as too expensive. He considered upgrading the existing road instead, but after the engineers talked of "stacking one direction of the highway on top of the other along the bottom of the cliff at Pukerua Bay, or wiping out much of Pukerua Bay village, and taking off the end of the bluff at Plimmerton", he saw Transmission Gully as the only practical option. But he was concerned about traffic reaching the northern end of the gully highway and having to stop at the Paraparaumu or Waikanae traffic lights. While a planner with foresight 50 years earlier had designated land for the Sandhills motorway from Raumati to Waikanae, the previous government had proposed allowing it to be used by the local district council for a new local road. Using the old highway route through the Paraparaumu and Waikanae shopping areas would require bulldozing houses and splitting the two towns in half. The NZTA proposed other options, such as the existing highway route, at several community meetings, but a full Sandhills Expressway on the old designation won by 2009, although opposed by Jenny Rowan, the Green Party Mayor of Kapiti Coast. On 15 December 2009 Joyce announced the Government's commitment to the project as one of seven Roads of National Significance, with a predicted cost of NZ$1.025 billion.

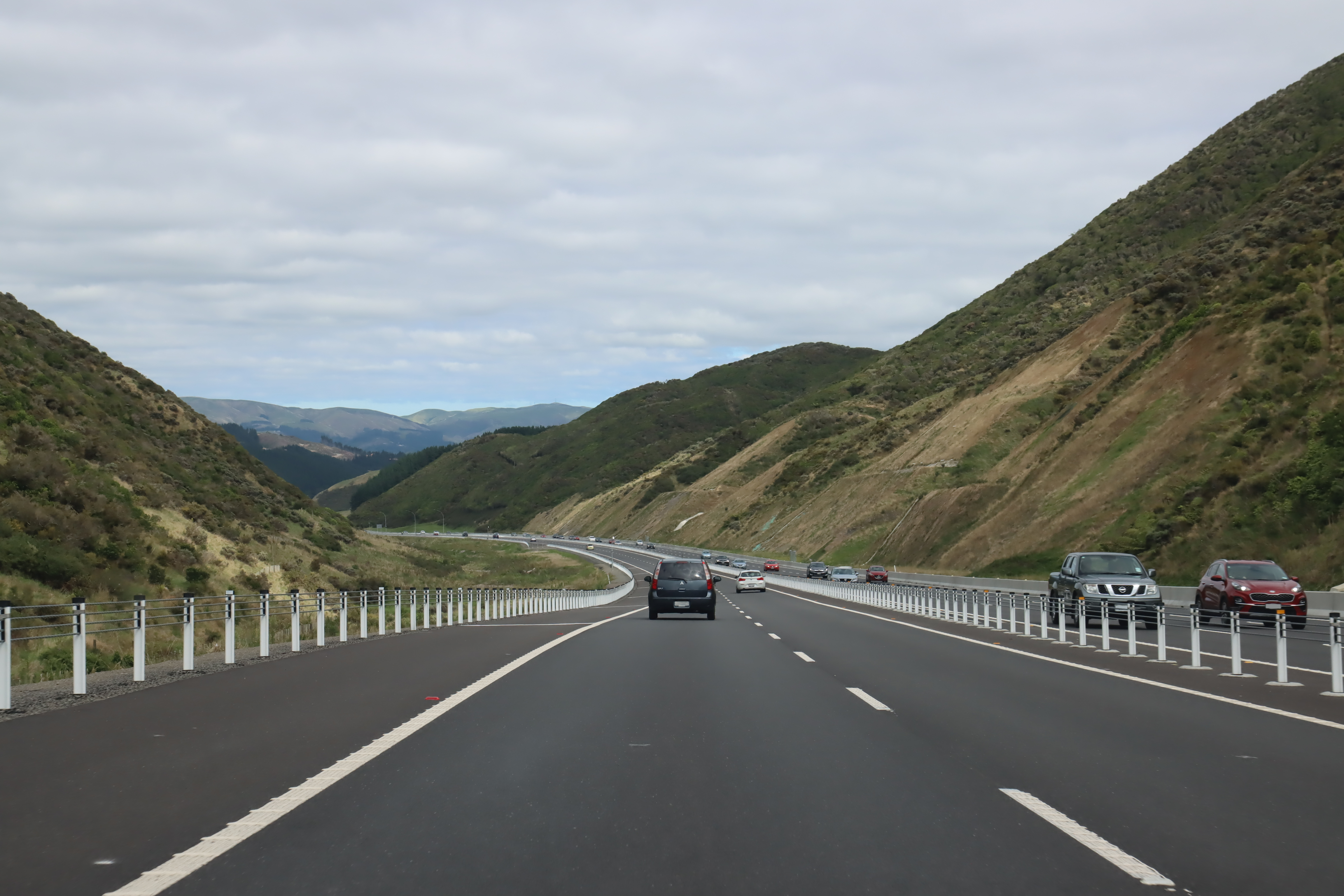
Looking southbound on the motorway

On 15 August 2011, the New Zealand Transport Agency (NZTA), Porirua City Council, and Transpower jointly applied to the Environmental Protection Authority (EPA) for notices of requirement and resource consents for the Transmission Gully Proposal. On 4 May 2012, after a series of public hearings, the EPA-appointed board of inquiry into the proposal stated in a draft decision that it would grant resource consents for it. On 22 June 2012, the EPA released the board of inquiry's final report. The board approved the resource consents and the notices of requirement needed.

On 16 May 2013, national grid owner Transpower applied for consent to the Kāpiti Coast District Council to rebuild its Valley Road, Paraparaumu, substation to 220 kV and build two short transmission lines to connect it to the two Bunnythorpe to Haywards 220 kV lines to the east. This would allow Transpower to demolish the existing 110 kV line between Pāuatahanui and Paraparaumu through Transmission Gully, rather than having to relocate it around the motorway.

In spite of significant opposition, construction of the four-lane motorway began on 8 September 2014 with completion originally scheduled for April 2020. Delays due to contractual disputes and difficulties caused by the COVID-19 pandemic pushed the budget out and the opening was scheduled for late 2021. Transmission Gully was formally declared a motorway on 16 August 2021 with the declaration coming into force 28 days later. It opened in 2022, as did the Pekapeka to Otaki expressway. The Otaki to Levin expressway was cancelled and then rescheduled by the Sixth Labour Government, and has not restarted.

=== Opening ===
On 30 March 2022, Prime Minister Jacinda Ardern officially opened the motorway. The road was officially gifted the name Te Ara Nui o Te Rangihaeata / Great Path of Te Rangihaeata by the Ngati Toa tribe in honour of Te Rangihaeata, a chief who played a leading role in the Wairau Affray and the Hutt Valley Campaign in the New Zealand Wars. The motorway passes to the side of the location of the Battle of Battle Hill, where the final stand-off between Te Rangihaeata and forces loyal to the British Empire took place before Te Rangihaeata retreated to Poroutawhao in the Horowhenua District.

The motorway opened to motorists on the morning of 31 March 2022. On opening day, a Holden VF Commodore police car drove into the northbound truck arrester bed due to driver error. It was repaired and continued in service until it reached the end of its service life in May that year. After being retired the car was preserved at the Southward Car Museum.

=== Further developments ===
In February 2026 Transmission Gully's speed limit changed from 100 km/h (62 mph) to 110 km/h (68 mph).

== Environmental issues ==
The route passes near the Pāuatahanui Inlet, an environmentally sensitive wetland area. Construction of the motorway has been identified as the likely cause of increased sedimentation in the inlet.

In October 2023 it was reported that pests such as possums, stoats, and ferrets were using Transmission Gully as a route to kiwi populations. After the highway was completed, the number of ferrets found in traps increased. In some cases, half of kiwi populations had been killed within weeks.

== Benefits ==
A report commissioned by Infrastructure New Zealand in 2025 showed that in 2024 Transmission Gully saved northbound travellers an average of nine minutes per journey, compared to the old route in 2019. Travel times on both the old route and Transmission Gully are shorter and more reliable throughout the day, ranging from a median five minutes across the whole day to 31 minutes in peak traffic on the busiest days. Faster travel times are offset by higher vehicle operating costs due to the hillier route and higher speed limit. Between 2022 and 2024, no deaths were recorded on Transmission Gully and the rate of serious injury was lower than that on the old route during the same period.

The Transmission Gully motorway means that 74,000 (15%) more people now live within 60 minutes' drive of Porirua's central business district. The population of Porirua has grown and house prices have risen due to increased accessibility.

== Name in official records ==
Land information New Zealand (LINZ) has applied the name gifted by Ngāti Toa Rangatira to the NZ Topo 50 map BP31. Neither of the names Te Ara Nui o Rangihaeata or Transmission Gully appear in the New Zealand Gazetteer.

== Interchanges ==
All exits are unnumbered.

Territorial authority	Location	km	mi	Destinations	Notes
Kāpiti Coast District	Mackays Crossing	0	0.0	SH 59 (Whareroa Road) – Queen Elizabeth Park	Northern terminus, SH 1 continues north as Kāpiti Expressway
Kāpiti Coast District	Paekākāriki	2	1.2	(Paekākāriki Link Road) to SH 59 (Centennial Highway) – Paekākāriki, Plimmerton	Southbound entrance and northbound exit
Kāpiti Coast District / Porirua City / Upper Hutt City tripoint	Wainui	5	3.1	Pouāwhā / Wainui Saddle 253 m (830 ft)	
Porirua City	Pāuatahanui	17	11	SH 58 (Paremata-Haywards Road) – Hutt Valley, Pāuatahanui	
Porirua City	Waitangirua	19	12	Waitangirua Link Road – Waitangirua, Whitby	
Porirua City	Cannons Creek	23	14	Te Ara a Toa Bridge (Cannons Creek)	
Porirua City	Kenepuru	26	16	Kenepuru Link Road – Porirua, Tawa	Southbound exit only, both northbound and southbound entrance
Wellington City	Linden	27	17	SH 59 north (Johnsonville-Porirua Motorway) - Porirua; SH 1 south (Johnsonville-Porirua Motorway) - Johnsonville, Wellington	Exit from northbound Johnsonville-Porirua Motorway and entry to southbound Johnsonville-Porirua Motorway only Southern terminus, SH 1 continues south as Johnsonville-Porirua Motorway
Incomplete access

== See also ==
- List of motorways and expressways in New Zealand
