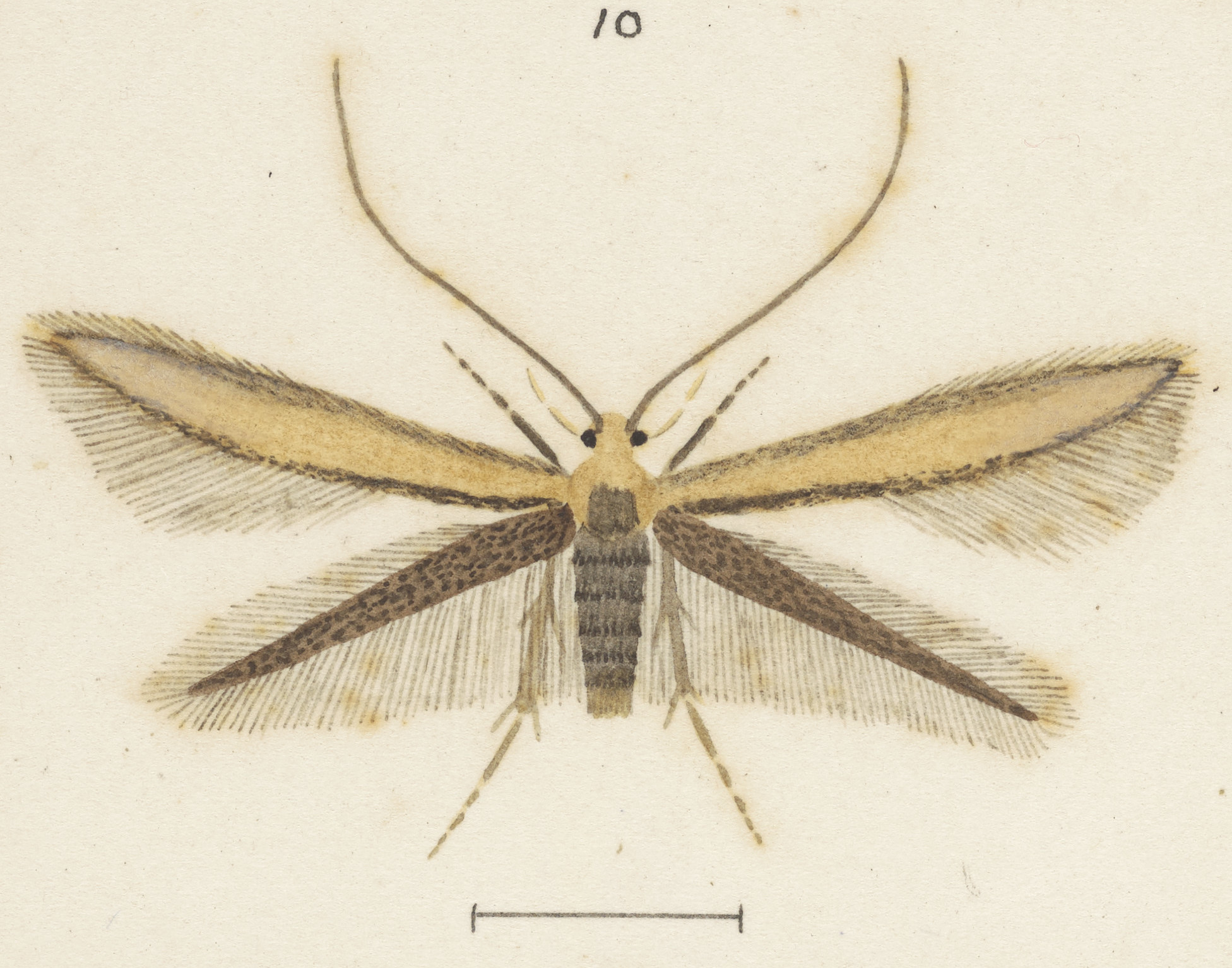
- Illustration of male

Conservation status
- Data Deficit (NZ TCS)

Scientific classification
- Kingdom: Animalia
- Phylum: Arthropoda
- Clade: Pancrustacea
- Class: Insecta
- Order: Lepidoptera
- Family: Elachistidae
- Genus: Elachista
- Species: E. eurychora

Binomial name
- Elachista eurychora (Meyrick, 1919)

Synonyms
- Irenicodes eurychora Meyrick, 1919; Irenocodes eurychroa (Meyrick, 1919) (misspelling); Elachista eurychroa (Meyrick, 1919) (misspelling)

= Elachista eurychora =

Species of moth endemic to New Zealand

Elachista eurychora is a species of moth in the family Elachistidae. This species is endemic to New Zealand and has only been collected at Paekākāriki. The habitat where the adult moth was originally collected was in rough vegetation on coastal sandhills or dunes but the collection locality has been significantly modified since that time. It has been hypothesised that the host of the larvae of this species is a grass. Adults are on the wing in March. In 2025 this species was classified as "data deficient" under the New Zealand Threat Classification System by the Department of Conservation. This species may possibly be extinct.

== Taxonomy ==
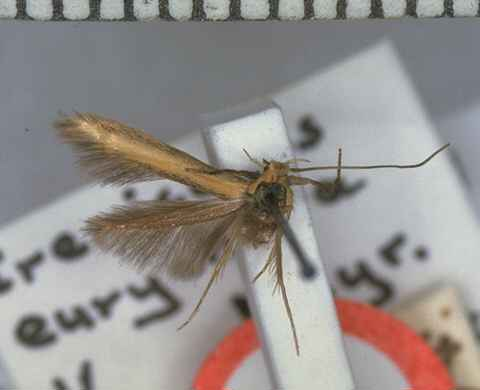
Elachista eurychora, male holotype

This species was originally described by Edward Meyrick in 1919 and named Irenicoves eurychora. Meyrick used a male specimen collected by George Hudson at in March. Hudson discussed and illustrated this species under that name in his 1928 publication The Butterflies and Moths of New Zealand. In 1971 Elwood Zimmerman photographed and illustrated this species and reassigned it to the family Elachistidae. In 1999 Lauri Kaila revised the family Elachistidae and confirmed the placement of this species within the genus Elachista. The holotype specimen is held at the Natural History Museum, London.

== Description ==
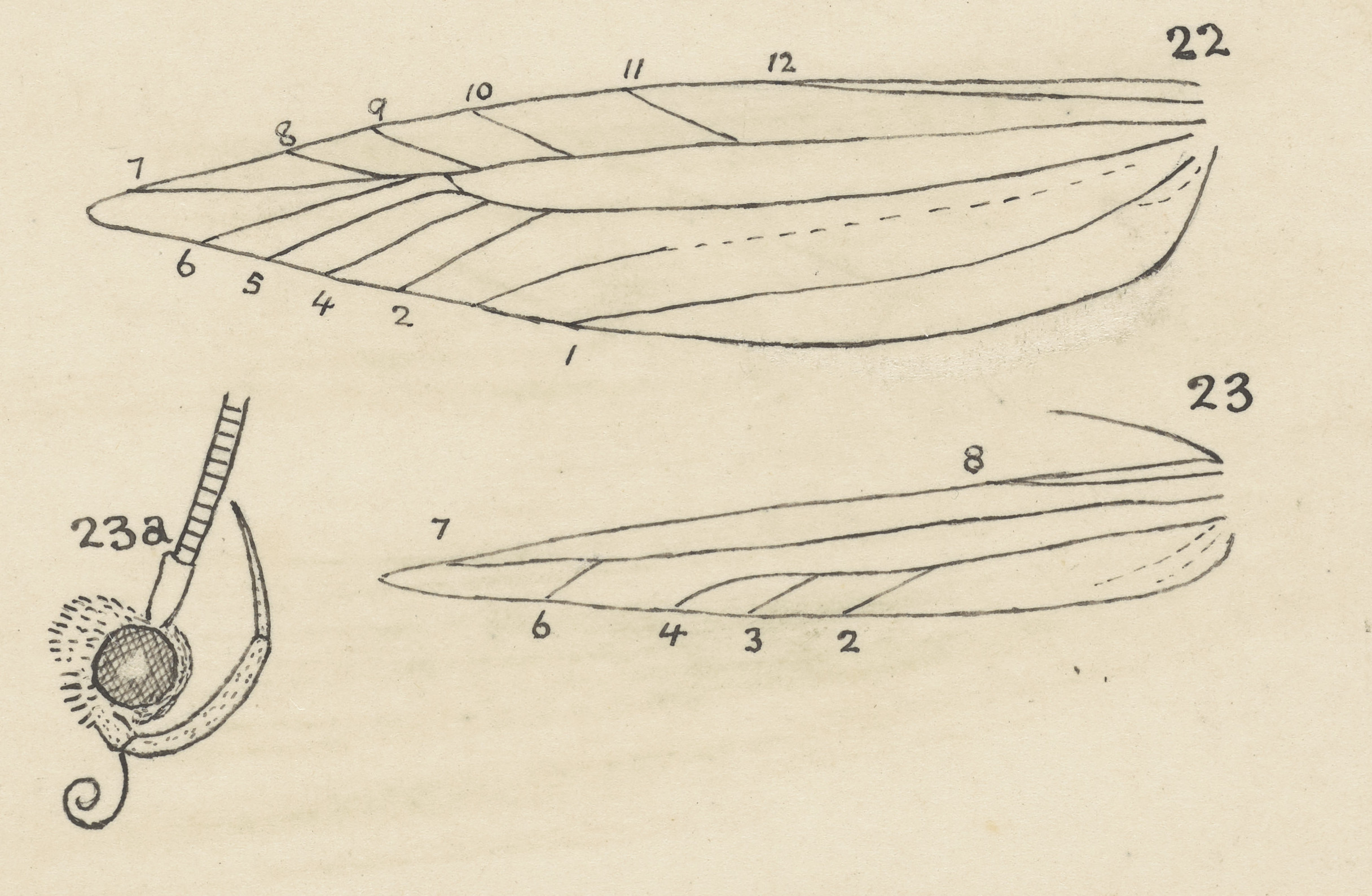
Illustration of neuration of wings and head of E. eurychora.

Meyrick described the species as follows:

♂. 13 mm. Head and thorax pale-ochreous. Palpi whitish, second joint suffused with grey anteriorly except at apex. Antennae grey. Abdomen dark grey, anal tuft ochreous-whitish mixed with grey. Fore-wings narrowly elongate-lanceolate, long-pointed, acute; pale brownish-ochreous; a costal streak of dark-fuscous irroration from base to near apex, and a similar somewhat narrower dorsal streak attenuated to extremities from base to near tornus: cilia grey, towards base scaled with pale ochreous. Hindwings dark fuscous: cilia rather dark grey.

== Distribution ==
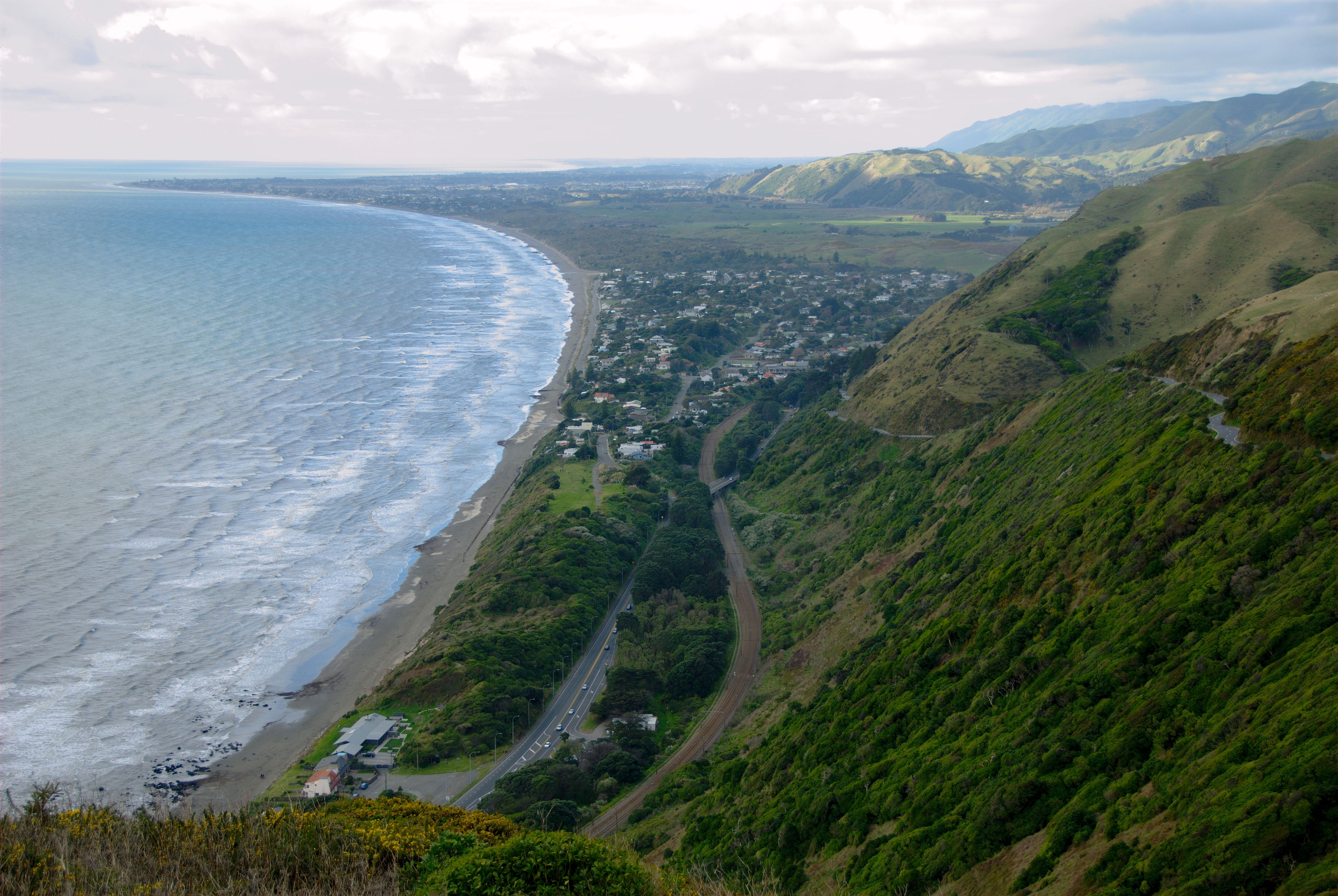
Paekākāriki, type locality of E. eurychora.

This is endemic in New Zealand. This species has only been found in the Wellington region. Hudson's specimen is the only time this species has been collected.

== Host and habitat ==
It has been hypothesised that the host of the larvae of this species is a grass. The habitat where the adult moth was originally collected was in rough vegetation on coastal sandhills or dunes. However this locality has been significantly modified since that time.

== Behaviour ==
Adults of this species are on the wing in March.

== Conservation status ==
In 2025 this species was classified by the New Zealand Department of Conservation as "data deficient" under the New Zealand Threat Classification System as a result of the difficulty in identifying the species. This species is regarded as being probably extinct.
