= Norman Winhall =

Norman Ernest Winhall (b West Ham 1 August 1905 - d Wellington 16 June 1961) was Archdeacon of Waitemata from 1954 until 1961.

Winhall was educated at St John's College, Auckland and ordained in 1931. After a curacy in Wellington he held incumbencies at Pahautanui, Upper Hutt (where from 1940 to 1943 he was a Chaplain to the Forces) and Epsom.
