= Pāuatahanui =

Rural locality in Wellington Region, New Zealand

- Rural locality
- Pāuatahanui main street.
- Interactive map of Pāuatahanui
- Coordinates: 41°06′S 174°55′E
- Country: New Zealand
- Region: Wellington Region
- Territorial authority: Porirua
- Ward: Pāuatahanui General Ward; Porirua Māori Ward
- Electorates: Kapiti; Te Tai Hauāuru (Māori)

Government
  - Territorial Authority: Porirua City Council
  - Regional council: Greater Wellington Regional Council
  - Mayor of Porirua: Anita Baker
  - Kapiti MP: Tim Costley
  - Te Tai Hauāuru MP: Debbie Ngarewa-Packer

Area
  - Total: 75.73 km^{2} (29.24 sq mi)

Population (June 2025)
  - Total: 1,030
  - Density: 13.6/km^{2} (35.2/sq mi)
- Postcode(s): 5381
- Area code: 04

Pāuatahanui (/ˈpaʊətɑːhəˌnuːi/; Māori: [ˈpaʉatahanʉi]) is a village in New Zealand's North Island. It is at the far eastern end of what was known as the Pāuatahanui Inlet (since renamed to Te Awarua-o-Porirua Harbour), an arm of the Porirua Harbour, northeast of Wellington. In local government terms, Pāuatahanui is part of the Pāuatahanui General Ward of Porirua City.

== History ==
=== Early settlement and history ===
After Te Rangihaeata was defeated in the 1846 Hutt Valley Campaign the area became safer as a route from the Hutt Valley via Belmont and Judgeford and on to the north, via Paekākāriki to the Manawatū and Wanganui. The road from Wellington reached Pāuatahanui in September 1848, and a reliable road to the north as far as Paekākāriki was completed by November 1849. Known nowadays as the "Paekākāriki Hill Road", it continued to be the main road north until the road bridge was built at Paremata in 1939. Access from the Hutt Valley was also upgraded to a road in 1873, and the road that was to become State Highway 58 from Haywards was established in the 1870s.

The first non-denominational Protestant chapel was built about 1856, and from 1861 Anglican services were held by a visiting clergyman once a fortnight. Congregations dwindled with an Anglican church built. It became tumbledown, and was demolished around 1910. Other churches were St Joseph's Catholic Church (1878) and St Alban's Anglican Church (1898).

The first hotel was constructed in 1847 by former whalers Edward Boulton and Thomas Wilson. Burned down in 1859, it was replaced by a fourteen-room Boultons Hotel. From 1865 other hotels were the Horokiwi Hotel, the Pauatahanui Hotel, the Empire Hotel and the Junction Hotel, largely to serve the Cobb and Co stagecoach traffic. In 1912 the area went "dry" and all the hotel bars closed. In the 1911 electoral redistribution the area was transferred from the Otaki electorate to the new Wellington Suburbs and Country electorate, and no longer had William Field as an MP. The new electorate was "dry" as the precursor Wellington Suburbs electorate had already voted "dry" in the 1908 election.

A community hall was built in 1904. It was demolished in 1966 and replaced.

In World War II the US Marines had four camps in the Pāuatahanui area; at Judgeford, at the Porirua side of the foot of the Haywards Hill, at Motukaraka, and in the Moonshine Valley. The Judgedford camp accommodated 3,755 men, the Moonshine camp had a recreation hall and a vehicle servicing depot, and the Haywards camp had a large theatre for the troops. Apart from a few huts for officers, most of the marines were in bell tents.

=== Environmental preservation ===
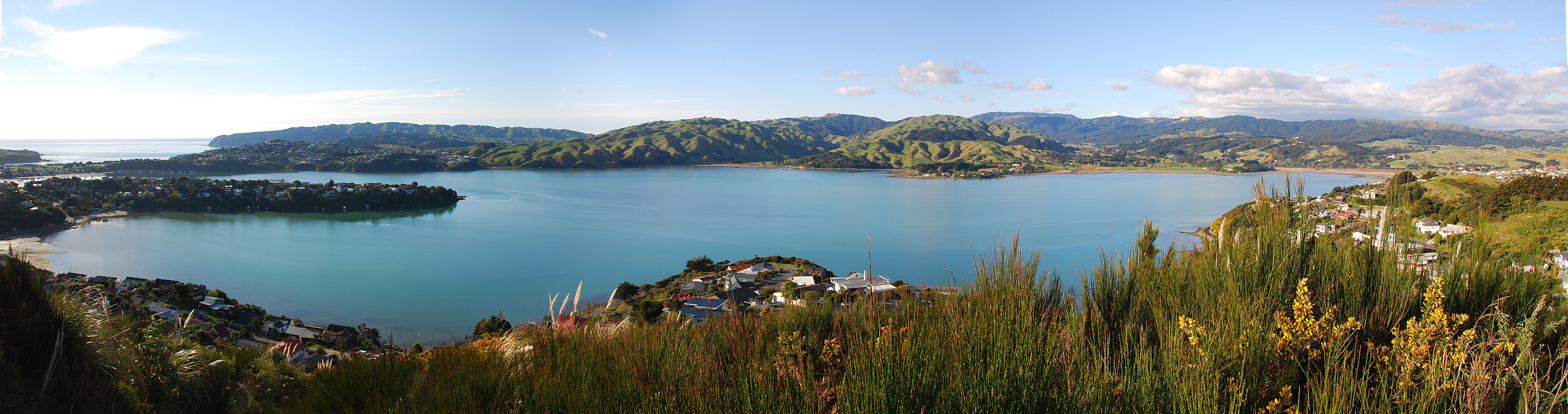
Pāuatahanui Inlet

In the early 1970s the development of sections at Whitby on the south of the Pāuatahanui Inlet caused noticeable silting and raised community concerns. This ultimately led to a detailed 3-year environmental study in 1975–1977, which was published as a book in 1980. Subsequently the Pāuatahanui Wildlife Reserve was created, in 1984, in order to preserve the only large estuarine wetland left in the lower North Island. The wetland reserve is run by the Royal Forest and Bird Society with ongoing efforts to reduce human impact on the environment and to restore damaged areas. The reserve has several hides for viewing birdlife, boardwalks, and some barbecue / picnic areas for visitors.

== Demographics ==
Pāuatahanui statistical area covers 75.73 km^{2} (29.24 sq mi) and also includes Judgeford. It had an estimated population of 1,030 as of June 2025, with a population density of 13.60 people per km^{2}.

Historical population
Year	Pop.	±% p.a.
2006	774	—
2013	924	+2.56%
2018	966	+0.89%
2023	990	+0.49%
The 2006 population is for a larger area of 75.95 km^{2}. Source:

Pāuatahanui had a population of 990 in the 2023 New Zealand census, an increase of 24 people (2.5%) since the 2018 census, and an increase of 66 people (7.1%) since the 2013 census. There were 510 males, 480 females, and 3 people of other genders in 336 dwellings. 2.7% of people identified as LGBTIQ+. The median age was 46.4 years (compared with 38.1 years nationally). There were 180 people (18.2%) aged under 15 years, 156 (15.8%) aged 15 to 29, 516 (52.1%) aged 30 to 64, and 138 (13.9%) aged 65 or older.

People could identify as more than one ethnicity. The results were 92.4% European (Pākehā); 10.3% Māori; 2.1% Pasifika; 3.6% Asian; 1.2% Middle Eastern, Latin American and African New Zealanders (MELAA); and 3.6% other, which includes people giving their ethnicity as "New Zealander". English was spoken by 97.9%, Māori by 2.1%, Samoan by 0.3%, and other languages by 7.6%. No language could be spoken by 1.5% (e.g. too young to talk). The percentage of people born overseas was 20.6, compared with 28.8% nationally.

Religious affiliations were 27.3% Christian, 0.6% Buddhist, 0.6% New Age, and 0.9% other religions. People who answered that they had no religion were 62.4%, and 9.1% of people did not answer the census question.

Of those at least 15 years old, 258 (31.9%) people had a bachelor's or higher degree, 435 (53.7%) had a post-high school certificate or diploma, and 114 (14.1%) people exclusively held high school qualifications. The median income was $63,700, compared with $41,500 nationally. 258 people (31.9%) earned over $100,000 compared to 12.1% nationally. The employment status of those at least 15 was 486 (60.0%) full-time, 120 (14.8%) part-time, and 15 (1.9%) unemployed.

== Education ==
Pauatahanui School is a co-educational state primary school for Year 1 to 8 students, with a roll of 196 as of July 2026.

It was established in 1855, originally in an undenominational chapel on the site of Rangihaeata's pā, and later in the military barracks vacated by the troops, making it one of the oldest schools in New Zealand.

The nearest secondary schools to Pāuatahanui are Aotea College in Aotea and Porirua College in Cannons Creek, both roughly 8.5 km away.

== Road links ==
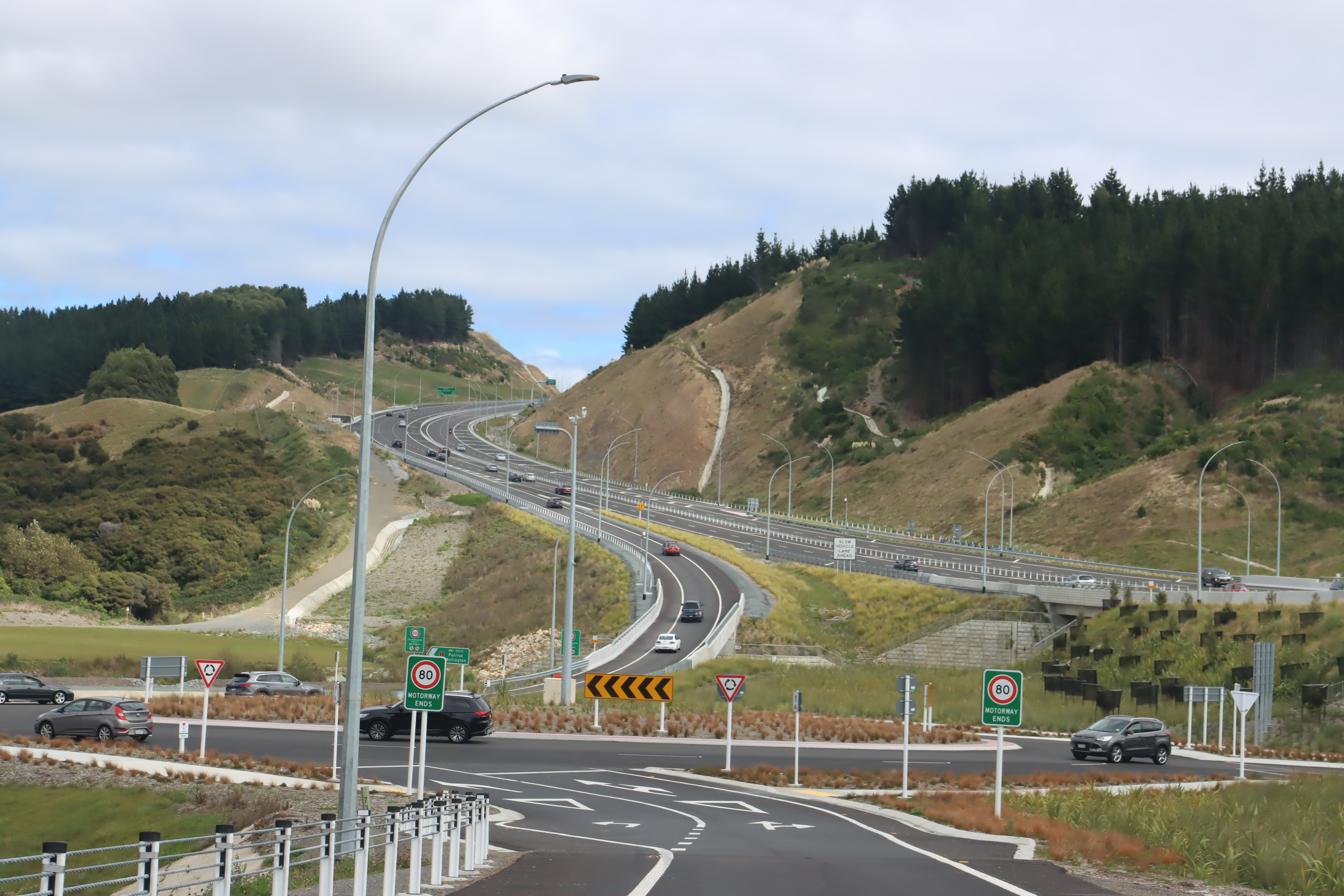
Transmission Gully Motorway, Pāuatahanui exit

State Highway 58 skims the southern fringe of the village and State Highway 1 (as the Transmission Gully Motorway) lies just to the east of it; the two roads intersect at a diamond interchange to the south of Pāuatahanui. SH 1 links Pāuatahanui to Wellington in the south and the Kāpiti Coast District (and beyond to the rest of the North Island) to the north, while SH 58 to the east leads to Judgeford and SH 2 in the Hutt Valley, and to the west skirts the southern edge of the Pāuatahanui Inlet to meet SH 59 at Paremata.

Other significant road links include Paekākāriki Hill Road which leaves SH 58 at a roundabout just to the west of the Transmission Gully interchange, provides the main road through the village itself, and continues to the Horokiri Valley and Paekākāriki (but is a slower route to Paekākāriki than the Transmission Gully Motorway, despite being the shortest route). Grays Road branches off from Paekākāriki Hill Road a short distance to the north of the village, and follows the northern edge of the Pāuatahanui Inlet to meet SH 59 at Plimmerton.

== Notable buildings ==
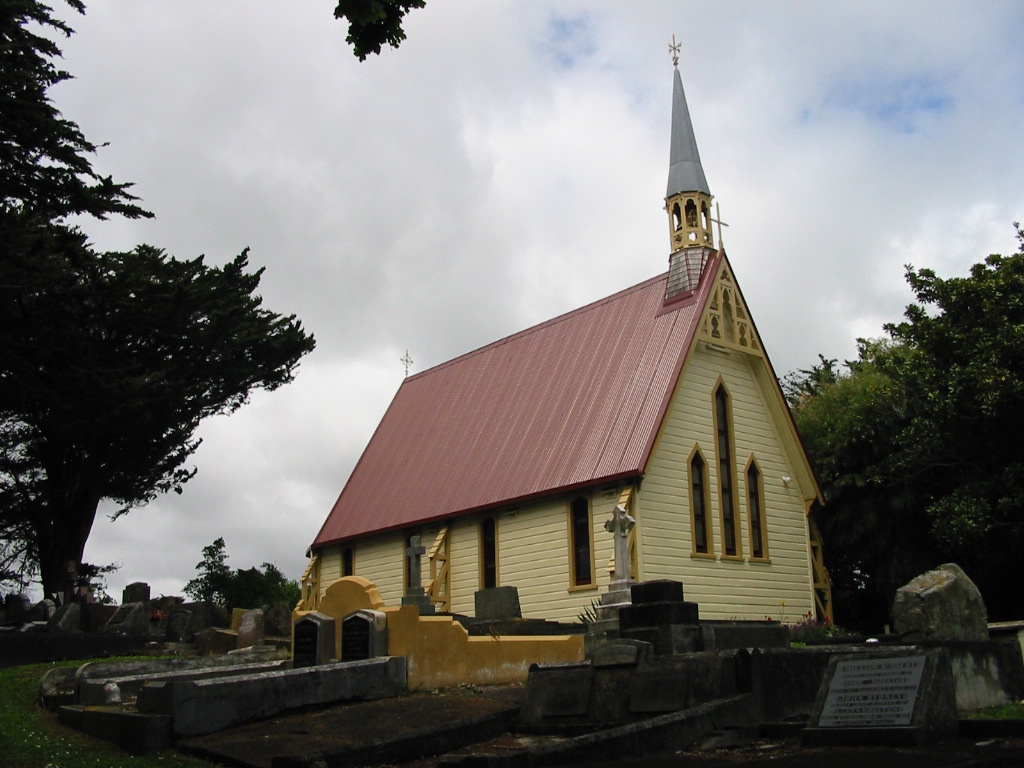
St Alban's Church

Pāuatahanui has a group of regionally significant 19th century buildings. They include St Alban's Church, St Joseph’s Roman Catholic Church, Thomas Hollis Stace Cottage, Barrys Place Historical Cottage and the Taylor-Stace Cottage.

Built in 1847, Taylor-Stace Cottage is the Wellington region's oldest surviving house, and is currently used as a beauty salon.

The former community hall (erected in 1967) was leased to a local company in 2003 and converted into the Light House Cinema, the only cinema in Porirua's northeastern area.

== Climate ==
Climate data for Pāuatahanui 1951–1980)
Month	Jan	Feb	Mar	Apr	May	Jun	Jul	Aug	Sep	Oct	Nov	Dec	Year
Mean daily maximum °C (°F)	21.4 (70.5)	21.7 (71.1)	20.3 (68.5)	17.5 (63.5)	15.0 (59.0)	12.7 (54.9)	11.9 (53.4)	12.7 (54.9)	14.1 (57.4)	15.6 (60.1)	17.2 (63.0)	19.6 (67.3)	16.6 (62.0)
Daily mean °C (°F)	17.1 (62.8)	17.5 (63.5)	16.2 (61.2)	13.8 (56.8)	11.5 (52.7)	9.4 (48.9)	8.7 (47.7)	9.5 (49.1)	11.0 (51.8)	12.4 (54.3)	13.7 (56.7)	15.6 (60.1)	13.0 (55.5)
Mean daily minimum °C (°F)	12.8 (55.0)	13.2 (55.8)	12.1 (53.8)	10.0 (50.0)	8.0 (46.4)	6.1 (43.0)	5.4 (41.7)	6.3 (43.3)	7.8 (46.0)	9.1 (48.4)	10.2 (50.4)	11.5 (52.7)	9.4 (48.9)
Average rainfall mm (inches)	85 (3.3)	51 (2.0)	81 (3.2)	87 (3.4)	150 (5.9)	131 (5.2)	140 (5.5)	112 (4.4)	91 (3.6)	95 (3.7)	90 (3.5)	72 (2.8)	1,185 (46.5)
Source: NIWA
