= Whitby, New Zealand =

Suburb of Porirua

Coordinates: 41°07′01″S 174°53′35″E

Whitby
- Suburb
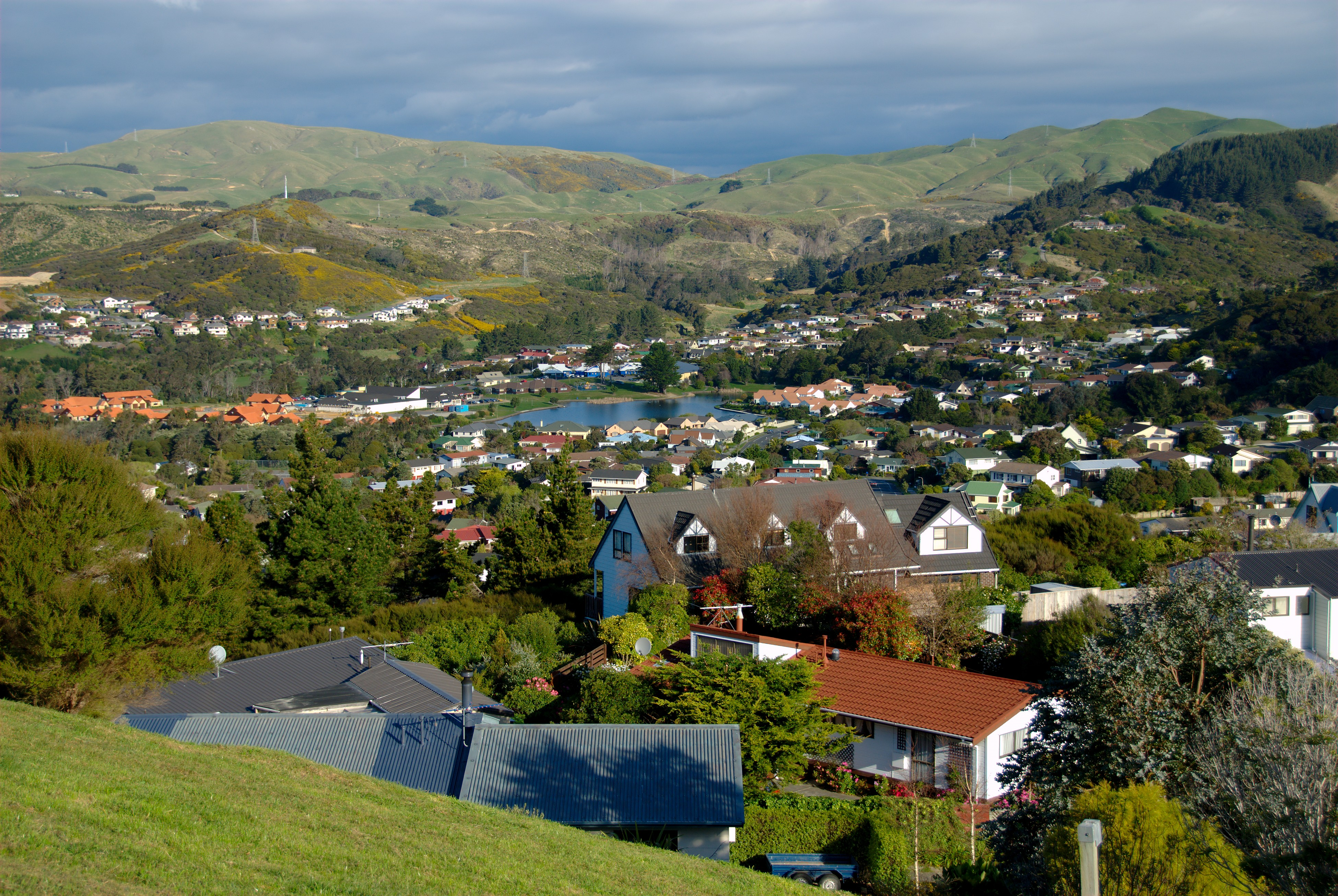
- Southern Whitby, with the lower lake at centre
- Interactive map of Whitby
- Country: New Zealand
- City: Porirua City
- Local authority: Porirua City Council
- Electoral ward: Pāuatahanui General Ward; Porirua Māori Ward
- Established: 1960s

Area
  - Land: 667 ha (1,650 acres)

Population (June 2025)
  - Total: 12,360
  - Density: 1,850/km^{2} (4,800/sq mi)

	Porirua Harbour
Paremata	Whitby	Pāuatahanui
	Ascot Park

Whitby is a large suburb of Porirua, New Zealand, located along much of the southern shore of the Pauatahanui Inlet of Porirua Harbour. Whitby was comprehensively planned in the 1960s (when still in Hutt County) and it has been continuously developed since, with current landscaping and expansion in the hills behind the eastern part of Whitby to facilitate the future growth of the suburb.

The name of the suburb itself, as well as the nautical theme of neighbourhood and street names, are drawn from the life and career of the Pacific explorer James Cook. The bicentennial of his first (1769) visit to New Zealand occurred when the development of Whitby started.

The suburb is commercially centred on the Whitby Shopping Centre, containing almost all the retail businesses in Whitby.

== History ==
In 1967 some 3,180 acres (1,290 ha) of farmland was purchased by a consortium for a new residential development, to be similar to North American new towns; with a population growing to 16,000 in four "neighbourhoods", each focussed on a primary school. Following a town planning appeal hearing in 1974 this became two "neighbourhoods", Adventure and Endeavour.

The first sections in the 01 subdivision were sold by auction in 1970. By May 1971 eight homes were occupied (5 Spinnaker Drive was first); and by 1972, 203 sections had been sold and 62 of the 117 houses built were occupied. By 1998 some 2000 houses had been built. The consortium developed a village centre and a golf course, and operated a commuter bus service from 1 February 1973. The New Zealand Institution of Engineers gave the development their 1978 Environmental Award for an engineering work exemplifying care for and consideration of environmental values.

The original area was part of the Horokiri riding of Hutt County, and some of the later land was in Porirua City. In 1988 the Local Government Commission decided that all of Whitby should come under the Porirua City Council. The Community Developments Consortium (originally Huapai Properties) had partners Fletcher Mainline, Jubilee Investments (part of the Todd Group) and the National Mutual Life Association.

== Demographics ==
Whitby, comprising the statistical areas of Whitby, Postgate, Endeavour East and Endeavour West, covers 6.67 km^{2} (2.58 sq mi). It had an estimated population of 12,360 as of June 2025, with a population density of 1,853 people per km^{2}.

Historical population
Year	Pop.	±% p.a.
2006	8,364	—
2013	8,841	+0.80%
2018	10,410	+3.32%
2023	11,799	+2.54%
The 2006 population is for a smaller area of 6.45 km^{2}. Source:

Whitby had a population of 11,799 in the 2023 New Zealand census, an increase of 1,389 people (13.3%) since the 2018 census, and an increase of 2,958 people (33.5%) since the 2013 census. There were 5,748 males, 5,994 females, and 57 people of other genders in 3,975 dwellings. 3.3% of people identified as LGBTIQ+. The median age was 38.2 years (compared with 38.1 years nationally). There were 2,574 people (21.8%) aged under 15 years, 1,917 (16.2%) aged 15 to 29, 5,751 (48.7%) aged 30 to 64, and 1,557 (13.2%) aged 65 or older.

People could identify as more than one ethnicity. The results were 79.5% European (Pākehā); 12.0% Māori; 9.3% Pasifika; 12.2% Asian; 1.3% Middle Eastern, Latin American and African New Zealanders (MELAA); and 2.7% other, which includes people giving their ethnicity as "New Zealander". English was spoken by 96.2%, Māori by 2.7%, Samoan by 2.5%, and other languages by 15.0%. No language could be spoken by 2.7% (e.g. too young to talk). New Zealand Sign Language was known by 0.8%. The percentage of people born overseas was 28.2, compared with 28.8% nationally.

Religious affiliations were 33.2% Christian, 2.8% Hindu, 0.8% Islam, 0.4% Māori religious beliefs, 1.2% Buddhist, 0.3% New Age, 0.2% Jewish, and 1.8% other religions. People who answered that they had no religion were 53.3%, and 6.2% of people did not answer the census question.

Of those at least 15 years old, 3,216 (34.9%) people had a bachelor's or higher degree, 4,707 (51.0%) had a post-high school certificate or diploma, and 1,296 (14.0%) people exclusively held high school qualifications. The median income was $62,100, compared with $41,500 nationally. 2,448 people (26.5%) earned over $100,000 compared to 12.1% nationally. The employment status of those at least 15 was 5,673 (61.5%) full-time, 1,182 (12.8%) part-time, and 180 (2.0%) unemployed.

Individual statistical areas
Name	Area (km^{2})	Population	Density (per km^{2})	Dwellings	Median age	Median income
Postgate	1.59	3,111	1,957	1,050	34.1 years	$57,900
Whitby	1.74	2,904	1,669	1,044	41.5 years	$56,400
Endeavour West	1.43	2,790	1,951	900	37.2 years	$71,300
Endeavour East	1.90	2,994	1,576	978	41.3 years	$66,800
New Zealand					38.1 years	$41,500

== Public transport ==
=== Buses ===
Number 230

Bus number 230 runs between The Crowsnest (Whitby) and Porirua railway station (Porirua), stopping at following stops (among others);

- The Crowsnest
- Spinnaker Drive at Hicks Close
- Aotea College opposite Okowai Road
- Porirua Station - Stop B

Number 236

Bus number 263 Runs between Navigation Drive (Whitby) and Porirua railway station (Porirua), stopping at following stops (among others);

- Navigation Drive
- Whitby Lakes (Upper Lake)
- Spinnaker Drive at Hicks Close
- Paremata Road (near 132)
- Paremata Station (bus stop)
- Oak Avenue (opposite 10)
- RNZ Police College - Papakowhai Road
- Porirua Station - Stop B

== Education ==
=== Primary schools ===
Postgate School is a co-educational state primary school for Year 1 to 8 students, with a roll of 315 as of July 2026. It is located within the smallest statistical area of Whitby, Postgate. It opened in 1981.

Adventure School is a co-educational state primary school for Year 1 to 8 students, with a roll of 462. It is located within the statistical area of West Endeavour. It opened in 1989.

Discovery School is a co-educational state primary school for Year 1 to 8 students, with a roll of 504. It is located within the suburb's centremost statistical area of Whitby. It opened in 1976.

=== Whitby Collegiate ===
Whitby Collegiate is a co-educational private secondary school for Year 7 to 13 students, with a roll of 357 as of July 2026.

Whitby Independent College was founded in January 2004 by David Bradford, CEO and owner of Whitby Coastal Estates Ltd. The company had recently closed the Duck Creek Golf Course that it owned. It was decided to redesign and convert the clubhouse and proshop for the first 4 classrooms and administration. The project was designed by Gina Jones of Accent Architects.

Whitby Independent was the Wellington region's first new independent secondary school in 100 years. The college was initially managed by Anita Baker, a senior executive of Whitby Coastal Estates Ltd. Anita later became Mayor of Porirua City.

3 years later the school was purchased by Samuel Marsden Collegiate School and renamed Samuel Marsden Collegiate Whitby. A new classroom block was completed in mid-2007 which includes a large art room.

On 1 July 2019 Samuel Marsden Collegiate School Trust Board announced it had made the decision to close Marsden School Whitby at the end of the 2019 school year. On 9 August 2019 Fiso Group Ltd announced plans to acquire the school. The sale of Marsden Whitby to Fiso Investment Group Ltd was finalised on 10 December 2019. The school became Whitby Collegiate at the start of the 2020 academic year.

=== Other education ===
Preschool education is available from Discovery Kindergarten, Adventure Kindergarten and Mana Montessori Preschool.

The nearest public secondary school is Aotea College in Aotea.
