= Mackays Crossing =

Coordinates: 40°58′13.75″S 174°58′53.23″E

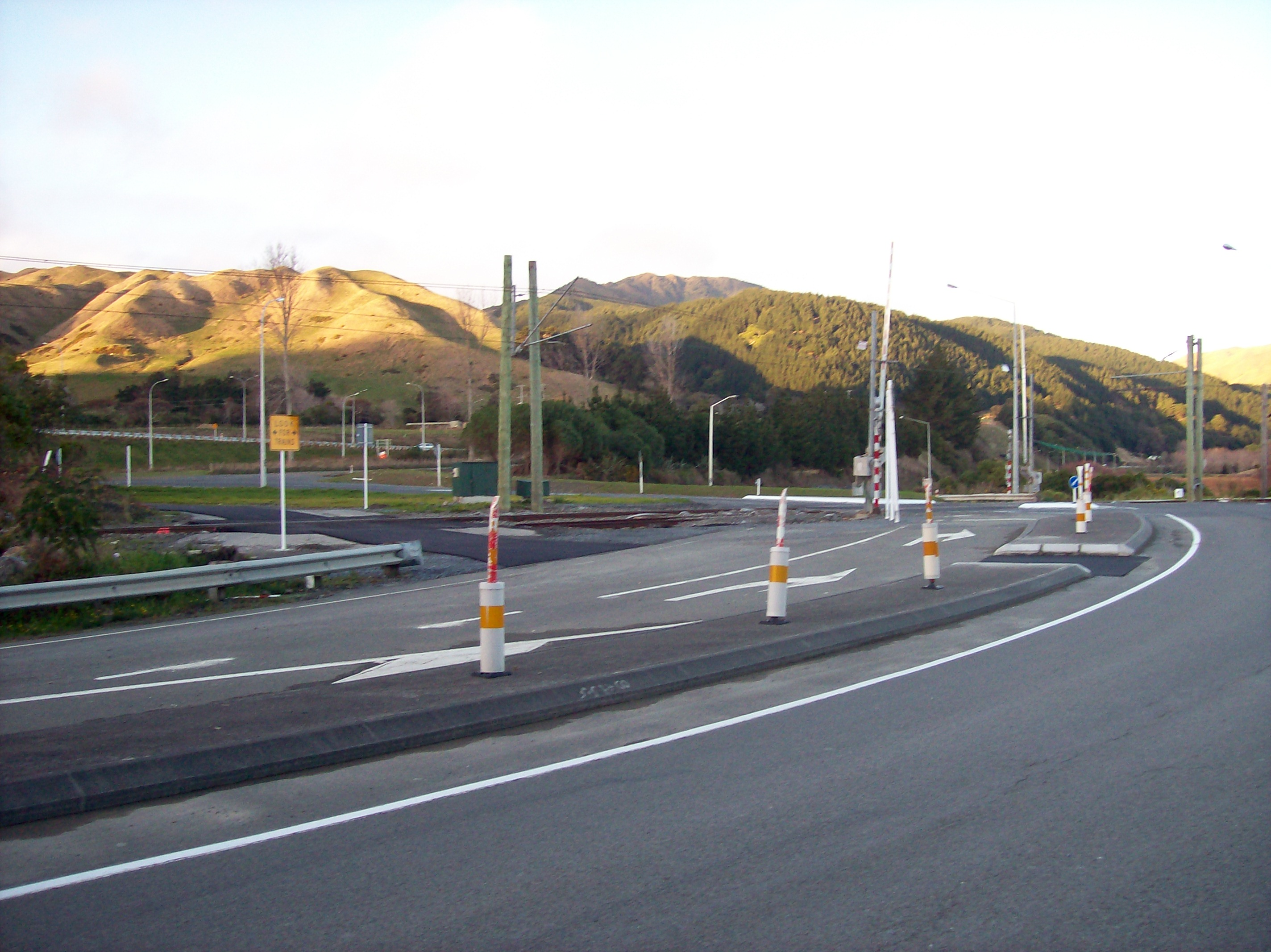
The level crossing for which Mackays Crossing is named, pictured in 2007

Mackays Crossing is a locality in the Kāpiti Coast District of New Zealand's North Island, located between Paekākāriki to the south and Raumati South to the north.

== Name ==
The locality was previously officially named MacKays Crossing, but was officially renamed in 2016 after a campaign to recognise the spelling used by the original Mackay founder. It is also sometimes seen spelled with an apostrophe.

== History ==
The Mackays Crossing area was inhabited by Māori until the mid-1800s when, following Government land purchases, they gradually left the area and European farmers took over. In 1859, Alexander Mackay was granted land in the area; the earliest references to the name "Mackays Crossing" are when the Wellington–Manawatu Line was constructed through this land and when SH 1 was later constructed (at the time via the Paekākāriki Hill Road), crossing the railway line at a level crossing on the land owned by the Mackay family.

During World War II, the area around Mackays Crossing was acquired for defence purposes and two camps, Camp Russell and Camp Mackay, were built in the area (a third camp, Camp Paekakariki, was located closer to Paekākāriki) to house troops from the United States Army and the United States Marine Corps prior to their deployment in the Pacific Ocean theatre. Following the end of the war, the land between the coast and the railway line was set aside for a regional park, becoming Queen Elizabeth Park, and the land further inland was taken over by the Department of Lands and Survey and later became Whareroa Farm.

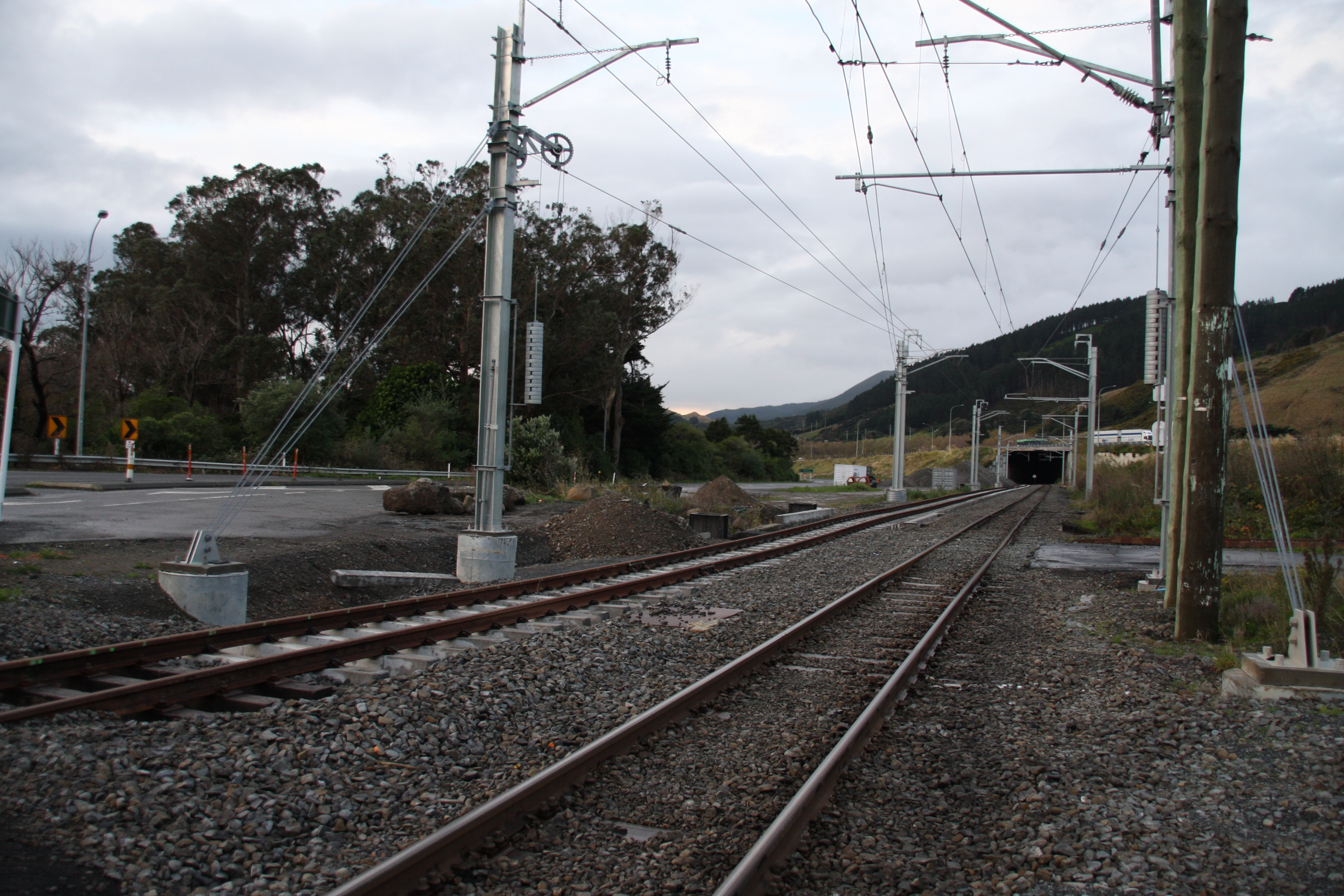
The North Island Main Trunk at Mackays Crossing, pictured in 2010 during construction to duplicate the line. The new track is the one at left. In the background is the SH 1 overbridge.

The level crossing at Mackays Crossing between SH 1 and the North Island Main Trunk was one of the last remaining level crossings on the SH 1 route between Wellington and Auckland until 2005, when a four lane overbridge and a 2 km (1.2 mi) realignment of SH 1 was constructed to provide grade separation. The level crossing still exists to provide access to Queen Elizabeth Park, and the Mackays Crossing Interchange is now the southern terminus of the Kāpiti Expressway and the northern terminus of the Transmission Gully Motorway.

In 1983, the railway line through Mackays Crossing was electrified as part of the extension of the Kāpiti Line commuter service from Paekākāriki to Paraparaumu. It was also double tracked from Paekākāriki as far as Mackays Crossing. The double track was extended from Mackays Crossing to the Waikanae River in 2011.
