= Paekākāriki =

Settlement in Wellington Region, New Zealand

- Small urban area
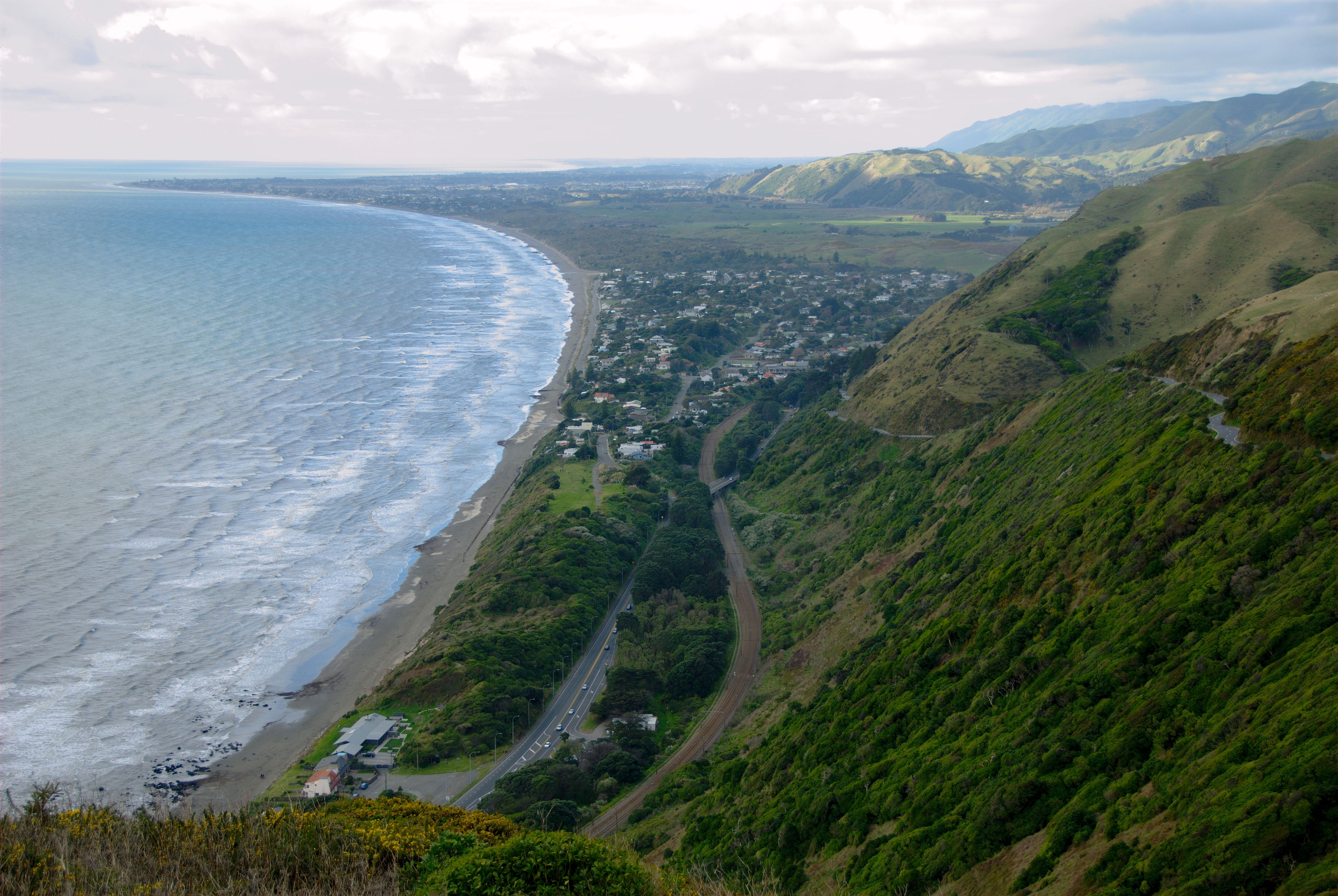
- Paekākāriki beach and township
- Interactive map of Paekākāriki
- Coordinates: 40.983°S 174.954°E
- Country: New Zealand
- Region: Wellington Region
- Territorial authority: Kāpiti Coast District
- Ward: Paekākāriki-Raumati Ward
- Community: Paekākāriki Community
- Electorates: Kapiti; Te Tai Hauāuru (Māori)

Government
  - Territorial Authority: Kāpiti Coast District Council
  - Regional council: Greater Wellington Regional Council
  - Kāpiti Coast Mayor: Janet Holborow
  - Kapiti MP: Tim Costley
  - Te Tai Hauāuru MP: Debbie Ngarewa-Packer

Area
  - Total: 6.15 km^{2} (2.37 sq mi)

Population (June 2025)
  - Total: 1,740
  - Density: 283/km^{2} (733/sq mi)
- Postcode: 5034
- Area code: 04

Paekākāriki (Māori pronunciation: [paekaːkaːˈɾiki]) is a town in the Kāpiti Coast District, in the south-west of New Zealand's North Island. The town is part of the Kapiti Coast functional urban area and lies 10 km (6.2 mi) south of Paraparaumu, 20 km (12 mi) north of Porirua and 41 km (25 mi) northeast of the Wellington CBD. The town's name comes from the Māori language and can mean "parakeet perch". Paekākāriki had a population of 1,674 at the time of the 2023 census, down 72 from the 2018 census.

Paekākāriki lies on a narrowing of the thin coastal plain between the Tasman Sea and the Akatarawa Ranges (a spur of the Tararua Ranges), and thus serves as an important transportation node. To the south, State Highway 59 climbs towards Porirua; to the north the plains extend inland from the Kāpiti Coast; at Paekākāriki the highway and North Island Main Trunk railway run close together between the coast and hills. Paekākāriki is also served by the nearby Transmission Gully and Kāpiti Expressway (both part of State Highway 1).

== Etymology ==
The town's name comes from the Māori language Paekākāriki. Pae in Māori can mean 'perch' and kākāriki 'parakeet', so pae kākāriki can mean 'parakeet perch'. Though usually written in English without macrons, the New Zealand Geographic Board changed the official name to Paekākāriki on 21 June 2019.

The name was also spelt Paikakariki prior to 1905.

== History ==
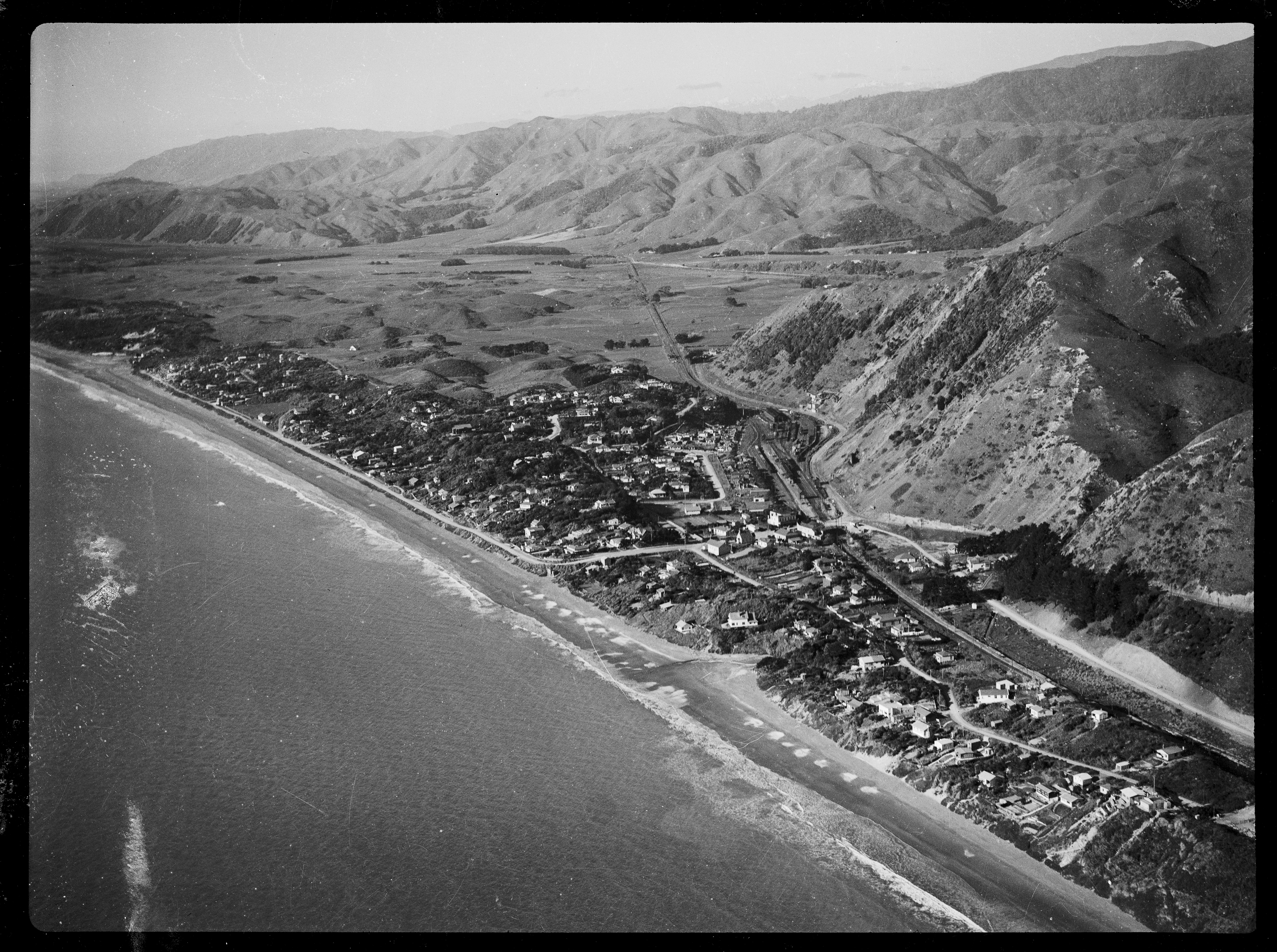
Paekākāriki, c. 1930

Prior to European settlement, the area was contested by Māori groups including Rangitāne and Muaūpoko. During the 1820s the war leader Te Rauparaha defeated and expelled the earlier inhabitants, claiming the region for Ngāti Toa and their allies. Ngāti Haumia, a hapū of Ngāti Toa, built their pā by the mouth of the Wainui steam at the northern end of Paekākāriki. Te Rauparaha, whose pā was on nearby Kapiti Island, died in 1849, the same year that a road connecting Paekākāriki with Porirua was completed. In 1850 the New Zealand Government resettled Wainui's inhabitants and merged their pā with the new settlement of Paekākāriki.

Paekākāriki's history has been intimately linked with the railway, and there is a museum at the Paekākāriki railway station commemorating this heritage. In 1886 the Wellington and Manawatu Railway Company's line from Wellington to Longburn was completed, and Paekākāriki became an important stop on the journey. In 1908, the line was incorporated into the national network of the New Zealand Railways Department and became part of the North Island Main Trunk linking Wellington and Auckland, the North Island's most important line. In 1917, NZR withdrew dining cars from its passenger trains due to World War I economic difficulties and Paekākāriki became a main refreshment stop on the trip north; originally a temporary measure, the dining cars did not return for decades and Paekākāriki's status remained until the 1960s.

From 1940 the line south to Wellington through the new Tawa Flat deviation was electrified and at Paekakariki engines were changed, with a steam engine depot at Paekakariki. Electrified commuter services were also extended to Paekakariki. The locomotive depot gradually declined in importance due to changing motive power, and nowadays only FP/FT "Matangi" class electric multiple units are stabled here. The old steam locomotive depot is now the location of "The Engine Shed", the base of Steam Incorporated, one of New Zealand's premier railway preservation societies. The Paekakariki Station Precinct Trust has been established to manage the station area, including the museum and Steam Incorporated's depot, and firmly establish it as a historical and tourist attraction.

During the Second World War Paekākāriki served as a major base for US Marines fighting in the Pacific Campaign. There were three main camps, all situated in or adjacent to present-day Queen Elizabeth Park. At the height of the occupation there were over 20,000 Americans stationed in the region, significantly outnumbering locals. The camps were used for training purposes, as well as rest and recreation for those returning from the Pacific combat zone. Paekākāriki's steep surrounding hills proved suitable terrain for marching and mortar practice, whilst its beaches were used to stage amphibian invasions. They were the scene of an unfortunate tragedy in June 1943 when a landing craft was swamped by a wave during a nighttime training exercise. Nine men drowned in the heavy surf according to official figures; local rumour put the toll higher. The incident was not reported at the time due to wartime censorship provisions.

While the American base in Paekākāriki was only in existence for a few years it had an important and lingering impact on the region. Several local place names remain as reminders of this wartime presence. Tarawa Street, for example, commemorates the Battle of Tarawa, one of the bloodiest battles of the Pacific War, which locally based marines fought in directly after the camps were abandoned in October 1943.

== Demographics ==
Paekākāriki is described by Stats NZ as a small urban area, which covers 6.15 km^{2} (2.37 sq mi). It had an estimated population of 1,740 as of June 2025, with a population density of 283 people per km^{2}.

Historical population
Year	Pop.	±% p.a.
2006	1,602	—
2013	1,668	+0.58%
2018	1,746	+0.92%
2023	1,674	−0.84%
The 2006 population is for a smaller area of 5.89 km^{2}. Source:

Paekākāriki had a population of 1,674 in the 2023 New Zealand census, a decrease of 72 people (−4.1%) since the 2018 census, and an increase of 6 people (0.4%) since the 2013 census. There were 774 males, 882 females, and 18 people of other genders in 690 dwellings. 10.2% of people identified as LGBTIQ+. The median age was 47.1 years (compared with 38.1 years nationally). There were 267 people (15.9%) aged under 15 years, 243 (14.5%) aged 15 to 29, 855 (51.1%) aged 30 to 64, and 306 (18.3%) aged 65 or older.

People could identify as more than one ethnicity. The results were 88.9% European (Pākehā); 18.5% Māori; 4.5% Pasifika; 3.2% Asian; 1.4% Middle Eastern, Latin American and African New Zealanders (MELAA); and 2.7% other, which includes people giving their ethnicity as "New Zealander". English was spoken by 98.0%, Māori by 7.5%, Samoan by 0.4%, and other languages by 10.4%. No language could be spoken by 1.4% (e.g. too young to talk). New Zealand Sign Language was known by 0.9%. The percentage of people born overseas was 22.0, compared with 28.8% nationally.

Religious affiliations were 15.2% Christian, 0.2% Hindu, 0.2% Islam, 0.4% Māori religious beliefs, 0.9% Buddhist, 1.4% New Age, 0.4% Jewish, and 2.2% other religions. People who answered that they had no religion were 71.7%, and 7.9% of people did not answer the census question.

Of those at least 15 years old, 618 (43.9%) people had a bachelor's or higher degree, 630 (44.8%) had a post-high school certificate or diploma, and 168 (11.9%) people exclusively held high school qualifications. The median income was $45,700, compared with $41,500 nationally. 270 people (19.2%) earned over $100,000 compared to 12.1% nationally. The employment status of those at least 15 was 690 (49.0%) full-time, 246 (17.5%) part-time, and 36 (2.6%) unemployed.

== Local government ==
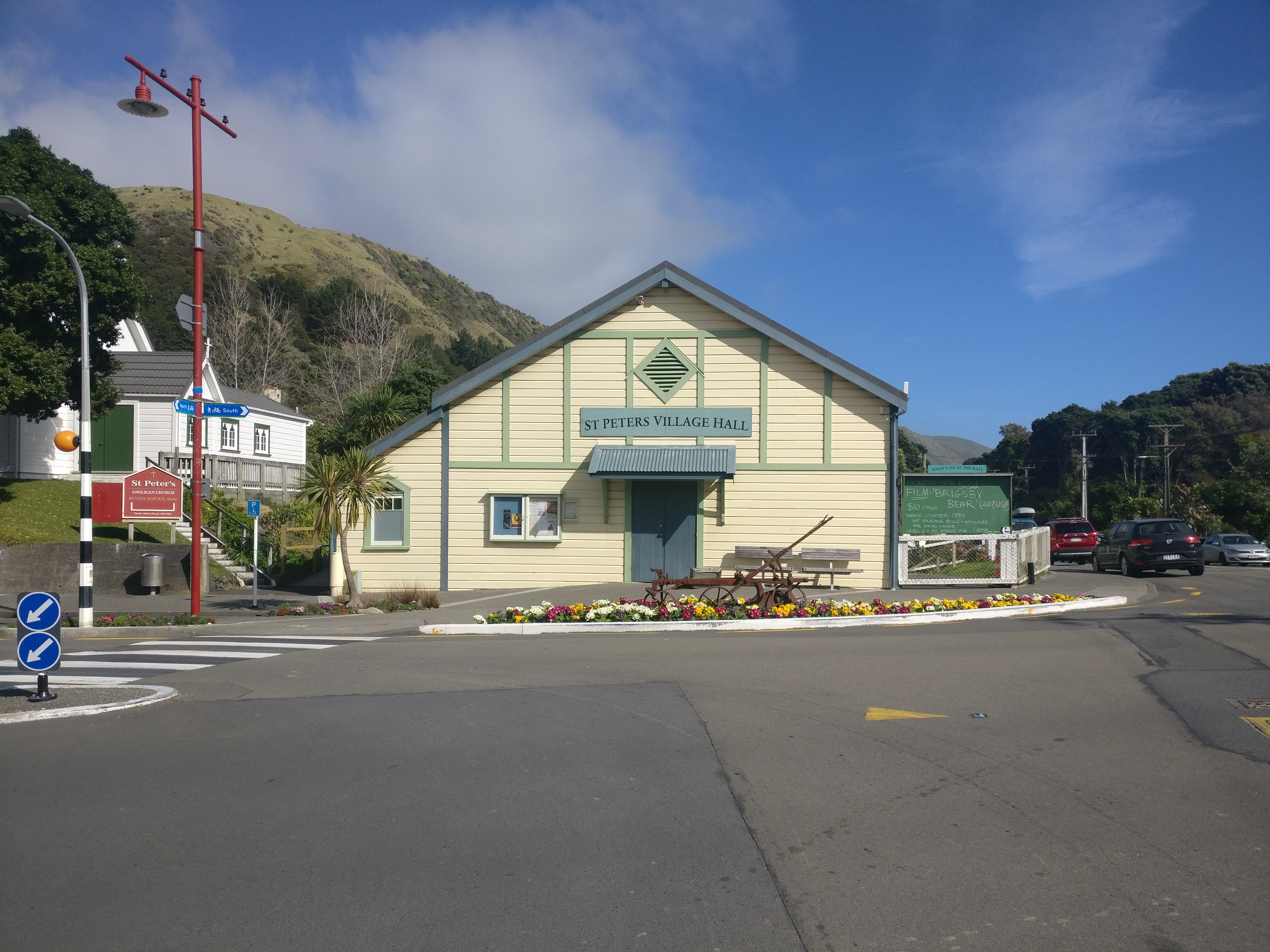
St Peters Village Hall

Paekākāriki is administered by the Kāpiti Coast District Council and elects the Paekākāriki Community Board, one of the Council's four community boards.

== Education ==
Paekākāriki School is a co-educational state primary school for Year 1 to 8 students, with a roll of 98 as of July 2026. It opened as Paekākāriki Public School in 1886.

== In popular culture ==
- The town was featured in the 1999 song "Paekakariki Beach", by the British rock group New Model Army. and in the 1948 song "Paekakariki, the land of the Tiki" by Ken Avery.
- The town also appeared in an animated documentary by the Simmonds Brothers, entitled: "Paekakariki: Center of the Universe".
- The American writer Leon Uris was stationed as a marine in Paekākāriki during World War II. He drew on his experiences there when writing his first novel Battle Cry.
- An album entitled "Paekakariki Moon" by Warwick Murray, featuring songs written and sounds recorded in the town, was released in 2017.
