= Escarpment Track =

Hiking track in New Zealand

Coordinates: 41°00′56″S 174°55′08″E

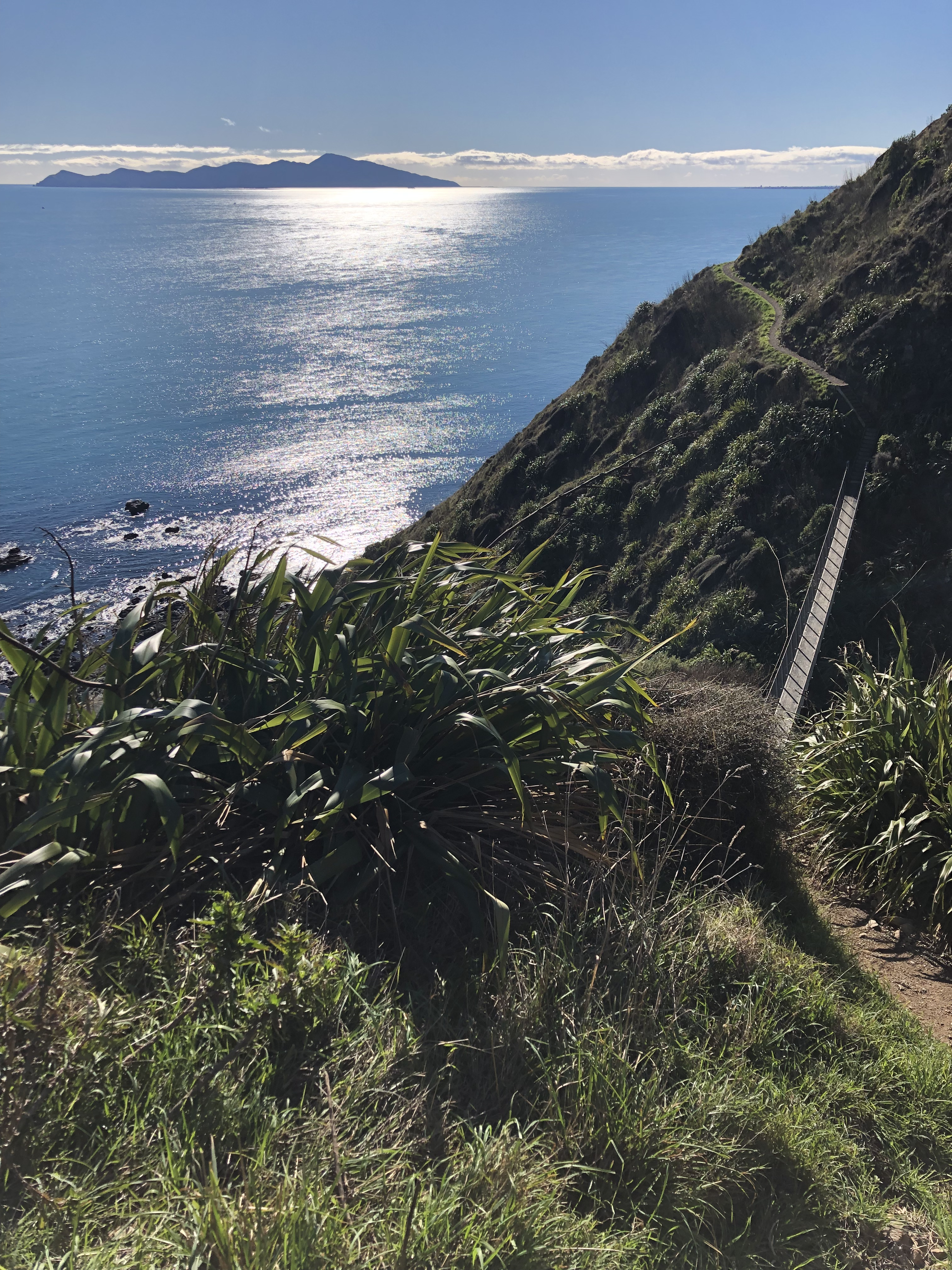
- View towards Kapiti Island
- Length: 10 km (6.2 mi)
- Location: Wellington region, New Zealand
- Trailheads: Pukerua Bay and Paekākāriki
- Use: Hiking
- Highest point: 215 m (705 ft)
- Difficulty: Medium
- Season: Year round
- Sights: Coastal scenery, native bush
- Hazards: Narrow track, steep drop-offs, steep stairs, high winds

The Escarpment Track is a 10-kilometre-long (6.2 mi) hiking track between Pukerua Bay and Paekākāriki in the northern part of the Wellington region of New Zealand. It forms part of the 3,000-kilometre (1,900 mi) Te Araroa trail from Cape Reinga to Bluff. The track climbs to approximately 215 metres (705 ft) above sea level, along a narrow route formed along a steep coastal escarpment. It overlooks a section of State Highway 59 known as Centennial Highway, and the North–South Junction section of the Kāpiti Line and the North Island Main Trunk railway line.

== Track description ==
The track can be walked in either direction, with walking access available from the Pukerua Bay and Paekākāriki railway stations. The trail is mostly single track, narrow and steep in many places, with significant drop-offs. The surrounding terrain is mostly covered in low growing vegetation, but there are some sections of taller vegetation and remnants of kohekohe forest.

The track includes approximately 500 lineal metres (1,600 ft) of formed staircases, with around 1,200 steps and two 40-metre-long (130 ft) suspension bridges.

At the northern end of the trail near Paekākāriki, there is an old quarry that is now the site of a lizard habitat restoration project.

== Planning and construction ==
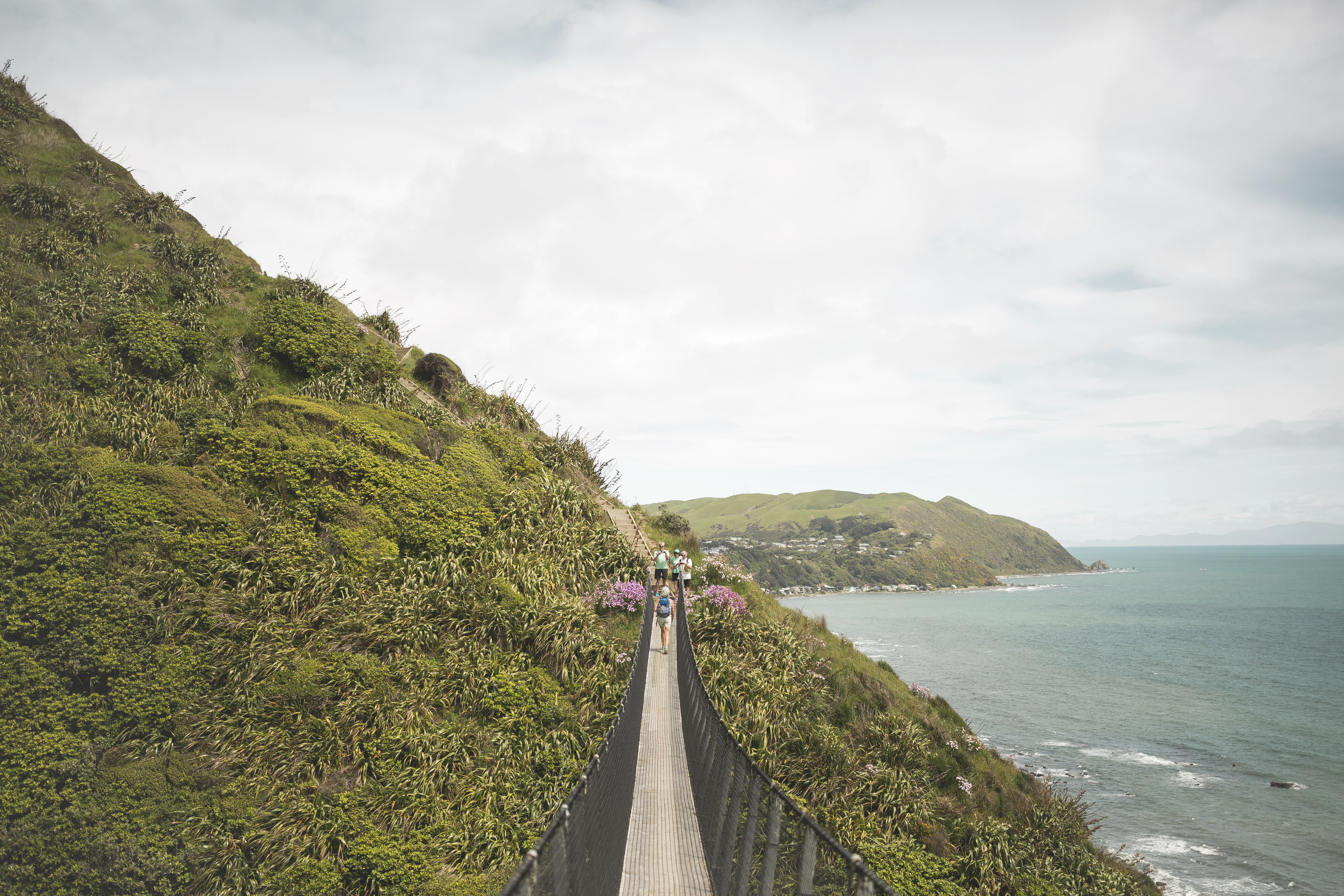
Swing bridge on the Escarpment Track

Early work on a track along the escarpment was started by a local environmental group Ngā Uruora - Kāpiti Project, as part of an ecological restoration initiative. They built an initial track from Paekākāriki to the site of Paripari, the old Maori village. At about this time, they became aware that the Te Araroa national trail project was seeking a route through the Tararuas to Wellington, and were considering valleys in the eastern Tararuas. The Ngā Uruora group proposed a route for the Te Araroa trail along the escarpment, and led several exploratory trips to demonstrate the potential.

Planning for the track included obtaining permission from KiwiRail and consents from landowners for the track to cross private land.

Work commenced in 2011 and by 2013, the first section of track was opened. Shortage of funds delayed the project until May 2015 when work got underway again. An official opening ceremony for the new track was held at Parliament on 7 April 2016, and the track was opened to the public two days later.

The Government contributed $800,000 to the track, but the final cost was $1.4 million.

== Medical events ==
There was a fatality on the track within three weeks of the track's opening in 2016. A man in his 60s collapsed at the top of a flight of steps. CPR was performed for 30 minutes, but the man died at the scene. In another incident in 2020, a man aged 41 collapsed, and required CPR from a bystander until emergency services could get to the site. He was resuscitated successfully.
