= Muri railway station =

Defunct railway station in New Zealand

Muri
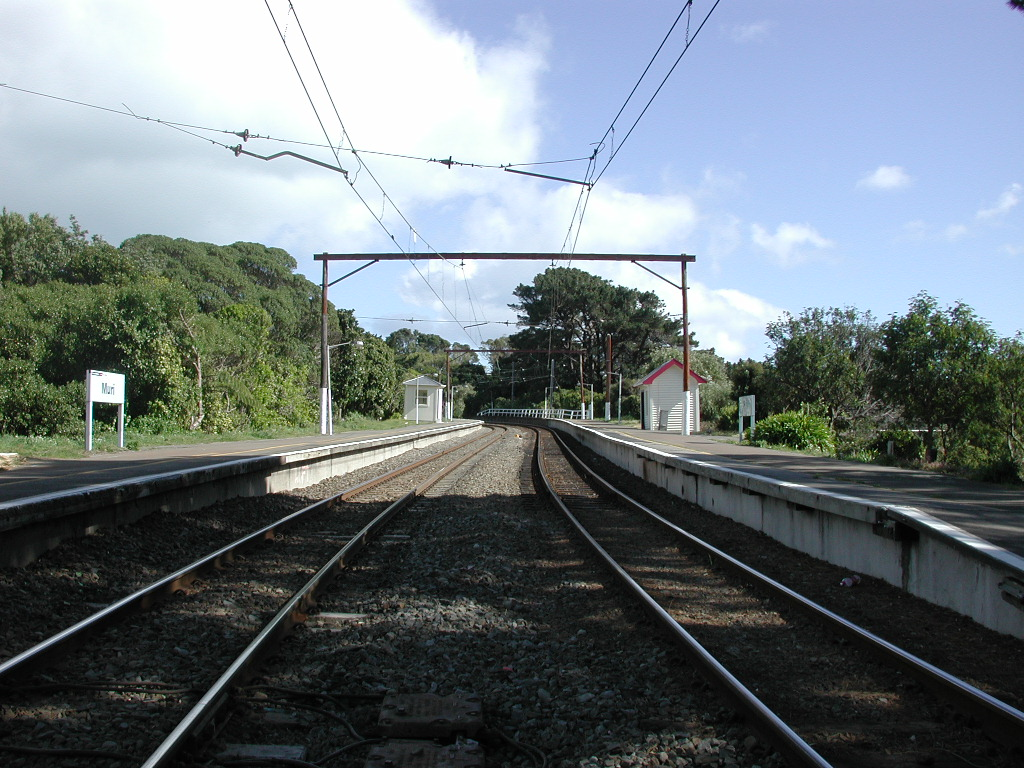
- Muri Station on 23 September 2001

General information
- Coordinates: 41°2′2″S 174°53′35.99″E
- System: Metlink suburban rail
- Owner: Greater Wellington Regional Council
- Line: North Island Main Trunk
- Platforms: Dual Side
- Tracks: Mainline (2)

Construction
- Parking: No

History
- Opened: 28 July 1952
- Closed: 30 April 2011

Services
| Preceding station | Transdev Wellington | Following station |
|---|---|---|
| Paekākāriki towards Waikanae | Kāpiti Line | Pukerua Bay towards Wellington |
Location

Muri railway station is a former railway station on the North Island Main Trunk Railway (NIMT) in Pukerua Bay, New Zealand; part of the Kapiti Line section of the suburban rail network of Wellington. The station was double tracked with side platforms on a straight section between two curves, 31.2 km from Wellington railway station, the southern terminus of the NIMT.

It was closed in April 2011, but Pukerua Bay station remains open.

== Services ==
Muri was served by Kapiti Line commuter trains operated by Tranz Metro under the Metlink brand until April 2011. Trains running every 30 minutes off-peak, and more frequently during peak periods used to stop in Muri until its closure. The platform and buildings remain in their original state.

Commuter trains were operated by electric multiple units. These were originally DM/D class units, but from the 1980s EM/ET class. Two diesel-hauled carriage trains, the Capital Connection and the Northern Explorer (previously Overlander), pass through the station but did not stop even when the station was still open.

Muri and Kenepuru stations had been considered for closure by the Greater Wellington Regional Council, claiming that both had low usage and would require considerable expenditure to upgrade for the new Matangi units and for safety considerations ($600,000 estimated for Muri). Following a sub-committee meeting of the Greater Wellington Regional Council, Muri station was closed on 30 April 2011 (Kenepuru remains open).

== History ==
The line through Muri was built by the Wellington and Manawatu Railway Company (WMR), completed to Longburn in 1886. During the last stage of finishing the tunnels on the coastal escarpment towards Paekākāriki, the last stop coming from Wellington was called Pukerua, near where Muri Station was. There were no roads into the area yet and passengers had to leave the train, climb down to the beach and continue by rail on temporary tracks to Paekākāriki.

Material for the construction of the railway north of Muri (the North South Junction) was offloaded from ships anchored off Pukerua Bay into small boats and brought to the beach. From there, a tramway took the rails, sleepers and bricks up to the railway track at Muri.

Muri opened on 28 July 1952, 45 chains (905 m) north of Pukerua Bay, and was closer to the centre of the population of Pukerua Bay at the time.

== See also ==
- North–South Junction
