= KP1 =

KP1 may refer to:

== Places ==
- Navassa Island (radio code KP1), Windward Passage, Caribbean Sea; see Amateur radio call signs
- Kępno Station (line station code Kp1), Kępno, Gmina Słupsk, Słupsk County, Pomeranian Voivodeship, Poland; see Railway lines of Poland
- KP-1, Kuraszków, Drzewica Formation, Szydłowiec, Mazovian Voivodeship, Poland; a borehole
- Kathu Pan 1 (KP1), South Africa; an archaeological site, see Hafting

== Military ==
- KP1, a military unit, a company in the His Majesty the King's Guard (Norwegian: Hans Majestet Kongens Garde) of the Norwegian Army
- ORP Batory (KP-1), a Polish patrol boat (Polish: Kuter Patrolowy 1, lit. 'Patrol Boat 1') with pennant number "KP-1"
- KP.1, a 1943 WW2 Allied convoy

== Biology ==
- Kimmig Kp 1, a varietal of grape, a type of Bouvier grape
- Przondovirus Kp1, see List of virus species
- KP.1, a variant of SARS-CoV-2 Omicron FLiRT virus, the virus that causes COVID-19, causing disease in 2024 in COVID-19 pandemic in Singapore

== Other uses ==
- KPS 10721 (also called 'KP1' in Unihan), "Code of the supplementary Korean Hanja Set for Information Interchange" standard of North Korea

== See also ==
- Vostok 1KP, a type of Space Race era space capsule in the Soviet Vostok programme
- Downtown Ottawa (postal code K1P), Ottawa, Ontario, Canada
- KPI (disambiguation)
- KPL (disambiguation)
- KP (disambiguation)
