= Public Entity Risk Institute =

The Public Entity Risk Institute (PERI) is a nonprofit organization that serves as a resource to enhance the practice of risk management throughout organizations and communities.

== About ==
PERI provides public entities, small businesses, and nonprofit organizations with enterprise risk management information, training, data, and data analysis.
PERI’s goal, as stated on their website, is to be a leader and resource in the field of risk management.

PERI’s stated objectives are to:

- Raise our constituents’ awareness and understanding that managing their organizations’ risk on an enterprise-wide basis is a critical component of success;
- Provide practical, affordable, and easily accessible enterprise risk management education and training resources to help PERI constituents effectively manage risk on an enterprise-wide and community-wide basis;
- Serve as a resource center and information clearinghouse;

The Public Entity Risk Institute is headquartered in Fairfax, Virginia. PERI is a not-for-profit, tax-exempt organization. PERI is not a membership organization.

== See also ==
- University of Delaware
- Disaster Research
- Training
- performance measurement
