= Pukerua Bay railway station =

Railway station in New Zealand

Pukerua Bay
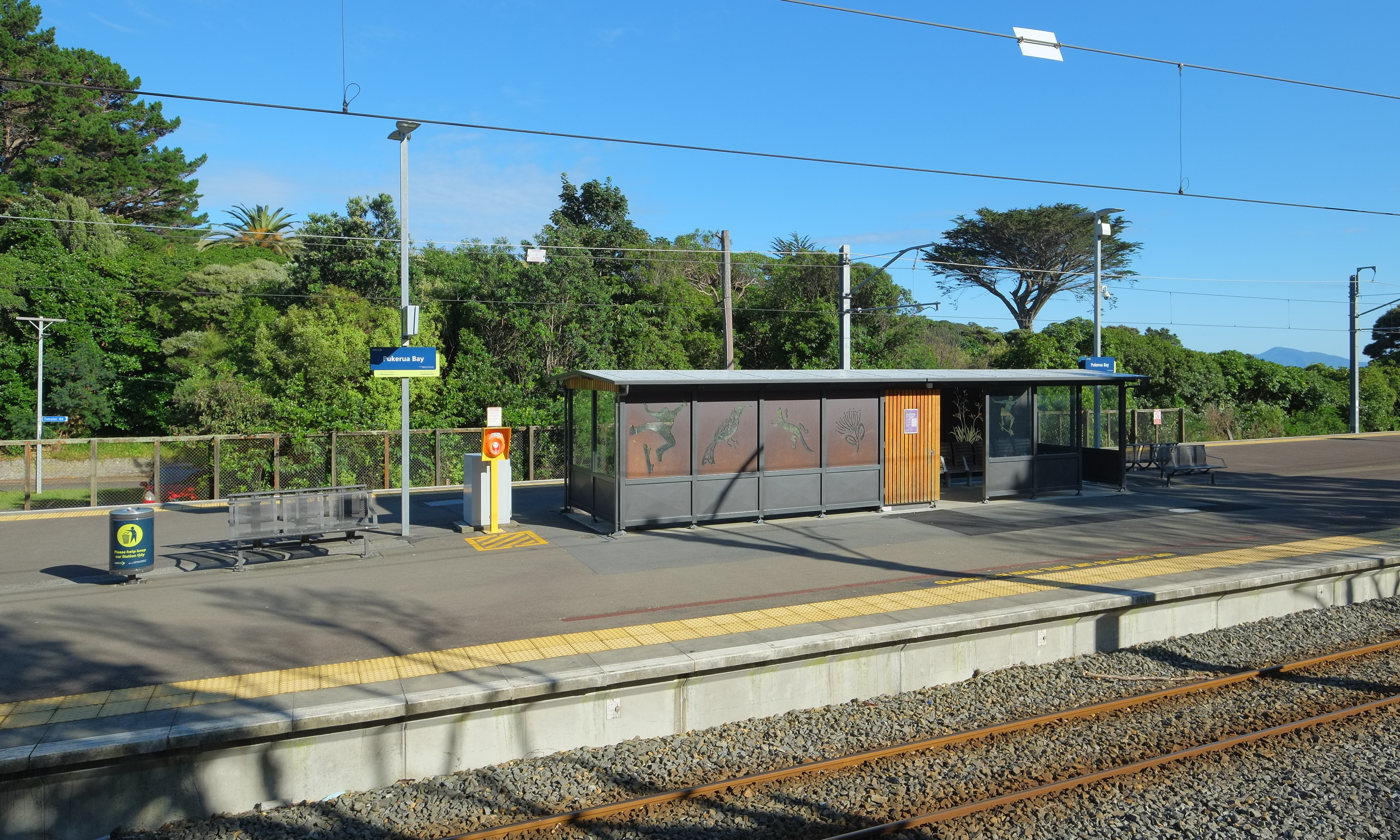
- Pukerua Bay railway station

General information
- Location: Takutai Road, Pukerua Bay, New Zealand
- Coordinates: 41°2′16.6″S 174°53′12.2″E
- System: Metlink suburban rail
- Owner: Greater Wellington Regional Council
- Line: North Island Main Trunk
- Platforms: Island
- Tracks: Mainline (2)

Construction
- Parking: Yes
- Cycle facilities: Yes

History
- Opened: 25 December 1885
- Rebuilt: 1940, 2010
- Electrified: 24 July 1940
- Former names: Pukerua (to 1923), Waimapihi (1920)

Services
Preceding station	Transdev Wellington	Following station
Paekākāriki towards Waikanae	Kāpiti Line	Plimmerton towards Wellington
Location

Pukerua Bay railway station is located on the North Island Main Trunk Railway (NIMT) in Pukerua Bay, New Zealand and is part of the suburban rail network of Wellington. It is double tracked, has an island platform layout, and is 30.4 km from Wellington railway station, the southern terminus of the NIMT. It is one of two railway stations in Pukerua Bay, the other one at Muri being closed.

== Services ==
Pukerua Bay is the fourth station north of Porirua on the Kāpiti Line for commuter trains operated by Transdev Wellington under the Metlink brand contracted to the Greater Wellington Regional Council. Services between Wellington and Porirua or Waikanae are operated by electric multiple units of the FT/FP class (Matangi). Two diesel-hauled carriage trains, the Capital Connection and the Northern Explorer, pass through the station but do not stop.

All suburban services running between Wellington and Waikanae stop at Pukerua Bay. Off-peak trains stop at all stations between Wellington and Waikanae. During peak periods, some trains from Wellington that stop at all stations may terminate at Porirua or Plimmerton and return to Wellington while a number of peak services run express or non-stop between Wellington and Porirua before stopping at all stations from Porirua to Waikanae.

Travel times by train are twenty-four minutes to Waikanae, fifteen minutes to Porirua, thirty-six minutes to Wellington for trains stopping at all stations, and thirty-two minutes for express trains that do not stop between Porirua and Wellington.

Trains run every twenty minutes during daytime off-peak hours, more frequently during peak periods, and less frequently at night. Before July 2018, off-peak passenger train services between Wellington and Waikanae ran every thirty minutes but were increased to one every twenty minutes from 15 July 2018.

The commuter trains were formerly of the DM/D class or EM/ET class.

== History ==
The line through Pukerua Bay was originally part of the Wellington - Manawatu Line, built by the Wellington and Manawatu Railway Company (W&MR). The W&MR was a private railway built as an alternative to the government's Wairarapa Line. The railway from Plimmerton to Pukerua Bay was constructed during 1885 under the no. 12 or "Pukerua" contract. Pukerua Bay railway station was opened on Christmas Day 1885, while the full line to Longburn was completed in November 1886.

Following the completion of the railway line between Pukerua Bay and Paekākāriki, the train station was called Pukerua. For a short time between 1919 and 1921, the train station was called Waimapihi, named after the Waimapihi block of land most of Pukerua Bay was situated in. In 1923, the station was renamed to Pukerua Bay to distinguish it from the South Island station Pukerau.

About 1917 a second loop and a signal box was installed (see photo).

From the 1920s onwards, Pukerua Bay station was a popular destination for weekend visitors from Wellington, with a road from the train station to the beach opened in 1926, well before the road into Pukerua Bay from Plimmerton. At one time a short service siding with trailing crossover on the down side was used to allow (steam) banking engines from Paekākāriki to return down the bank. The station building once had a long drop, and three other buildings next to the siding. Sheep were driven along the now restored path through the bush at the bottom of Seavista Drive, to be loaded onto wagons at the station.

Once double-tracking of the railway line from Wellington was completed, the original station building was replaced in 1940 with the current island platform. The station's platform upgrade in 2010 raised platform height, bringing it into line with other stations on the network and added safety features such as yellow tactile strips and put electrical ducting in place to support a real-time passenger information system later introduced by the Greater Wellington Regional Council.

Since the opening of the Escarpment track running between Paekakariki and Pukerua Bay, an increase in usage by hikers is seen on good days.

In late 2022, the station had Snapper Terminals installed allowing the usage of cashless and ticketless travel.

== See also ==
- North–South Junction
