= Performance measurement =

Process of collecting, analyzing and/or reporting information regarding performance

Performance measurement is the process of collecting, analyzing and reporting information regarding the performance of an individual, group, organization, system or component.

Definitions of performance measurement tend to be predicated upon an assumption about why the performance is being measured.

- Moullin defines the term with a forward looking organisational focus—"the process of evaluating how well organisations are managed and the value they deliver for customers and other stakeholders".
- Neely et al. use a more operational retrospective focus—"the process of quantifying the efficiency and effectiveness of past actions".
- In 2007 the Office of the Chief Information Officer in the US defined it using a more evaluative focus—"Performance measurement estimates the parameters under which programs, investments, and acquisitions are reaching the targeted results".
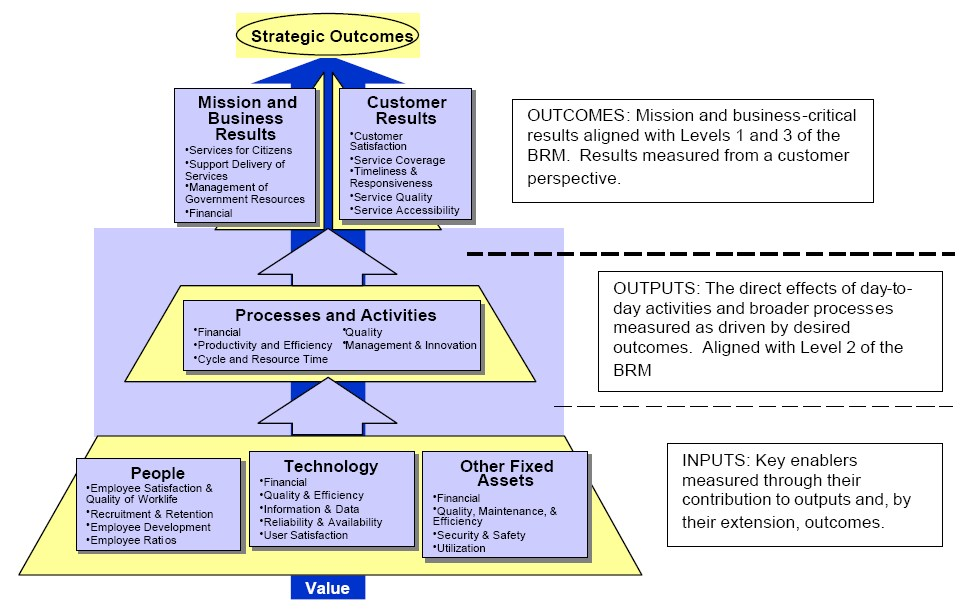
  Performance Reference Model of the Federal Enterprise Architecture, 2005.

Defining performance measures or methods by which they can be chosen is also a popular activity for academics—for example a list of railway infrastructure indicators is offered by Stenström et al., a novel method for measure selection is proposed by Mendibil et al.

== Standards ==
Operational standards often include pre-defined lists of standard performance measures. For example, EN 15341 identifies 71 performance indicators, whereof 21 are technical indicators, or those in a US Federal Government directive from 1999—National Partnership for Reinventing Government, US; Balancing Measures: Best Practices in Performance Management, August 1999.

== Real-life application ==
Academic articles that provide critical reviews of performance measurement in specific domains are also common—e.g. Ittner's observations on non-financial reporting by commercial organisations; Boris et al.'s observations about use of performance measurement in non-profit organisations; or Bühler et al.'s (2016) analysis of how external turbulence could be reflected in performance measurement systems.

The use of performance measurement system in company is very important, but is rarely used by Small and Medium Enterprises. The use of KPIs as a strategy of management in achieving performance in line with different purposes of an organization, such as research management of a research institute, could be considered as a complex scenario in this context. However, tools that facilitate unique, unambiguous, and homogeneous management of performance, for example KPI-index to integrate all performance indicators from bottom to top of each and every layer of an organization are supposed to act as strategies for better performance management of complex performance management systems.

== Frameworks ==
There is little consensus about how to define or use performance measures apart from an agreement about it being linked to some kind of measurement of performance. This led to the emergence of organising frameworks that incorporate performance measures. These frameworks often prescribe methods for choosing and using the appropriate measures for that application.

The most common such frameworks include:

- Balanced scorecard—used by organisations to manage the implementation of corporate strategies
- Key performance indicator—a method for choosing important/critical performance measures, usually in an organisational context
- Performance prism—a second-generation performance measurement framework used by organizations to manage performance by considering the needs and contributions of all stakeholders, not just shareholders and customers.

=== Balanced scorecard ===
A balanced scorecard is a strategy performance management tool – a well-structured report used to keep track of the execution of activities by staff and to monitor the consequences arising from these actions.

=== Key performance indicator ===
A performance indicator or key performance indicator (KPI) is a type of performance measurement used to evaluate the success of an organization, activity, project, or process in achieving defined objectives. KPIs provide a focus for strategic and operational improvement, support evidence-based decision-making, and help organizations identify and monitor factors critical to performance.

=== Performance prism ===
The Performance Prism is a performance measurement framework that improves on traditional models like the balanced scorecard by offering a broader view of stakeholders. It focuses on five key areas: Stakeholder Satisfaction, Strategies, Processes, Capabilities, and Stakeholder Contributions. The framework encourages organizations to consider the needs of all stakeholders, such as employees, suppliers, and regulators. It also helps assess how these stakeholders contribute to the organization's success. By balancing both stakeholder needs and contributions, the Performance Prism provides a flexible approach suitable for various types of organizations.

== See also ==
- Outline of management
