= North–South Junction =

Railway near Wellington, New Zealand

The North–South Junction is a section of single-track rail line about 3.4 km long, north of Wellington, New Zealand, between the closed (2011) Muri railway station (north of Pukerua Bay railway station) and the (lower) Paekakariki railway station to the north. It is part of the Kāpiti Line section of the North Island Main Trunk line between Wellington and Auckland, and part of the Wellington–Manawatu Line, built by the Wellington & Manawatu Railway Company (WMR).

Because of the commuter traffic from Wellington to Waikanae plus freight traffic, the line north is double tracked to just before the bridge over SH59, before the Waikanae River bridge south of Waikanae railway station, and the line south from Pukerua Bay is double tracked to the terminus at Wellington railway station.

The line is on an unstable hillside, the Paekakariki Escarpment, and with a two-lane section of State Highway 59 (formerly State Highway 1; to 7 December 2021) below, which runs along the edge of the sea front, the route is almost perpendicular in places and the section constitutes a bottleneck for rail transport north of Wellington. The line climbs 200 feet in 5 miles going south (61m in 8 km); the hillside is a “creeper”. The line has steep gradients south from Paekakariki and climbing to Pukerua Bay at a ratio of 1 in 66, with short sections of 1 in 60 and 1 in 118.

The Wellington-Manawatu Line was built by the Wellington & Manawatu Railway Company (WMR) in the 1880s. It ran from Wellington to Longburn near Palmerston North, where it connected with the New Zealand Railways (NZR) system, and it was handed over to the NZR at the end of 1908.

The Escarpment walking track runs above this section of road and rail.

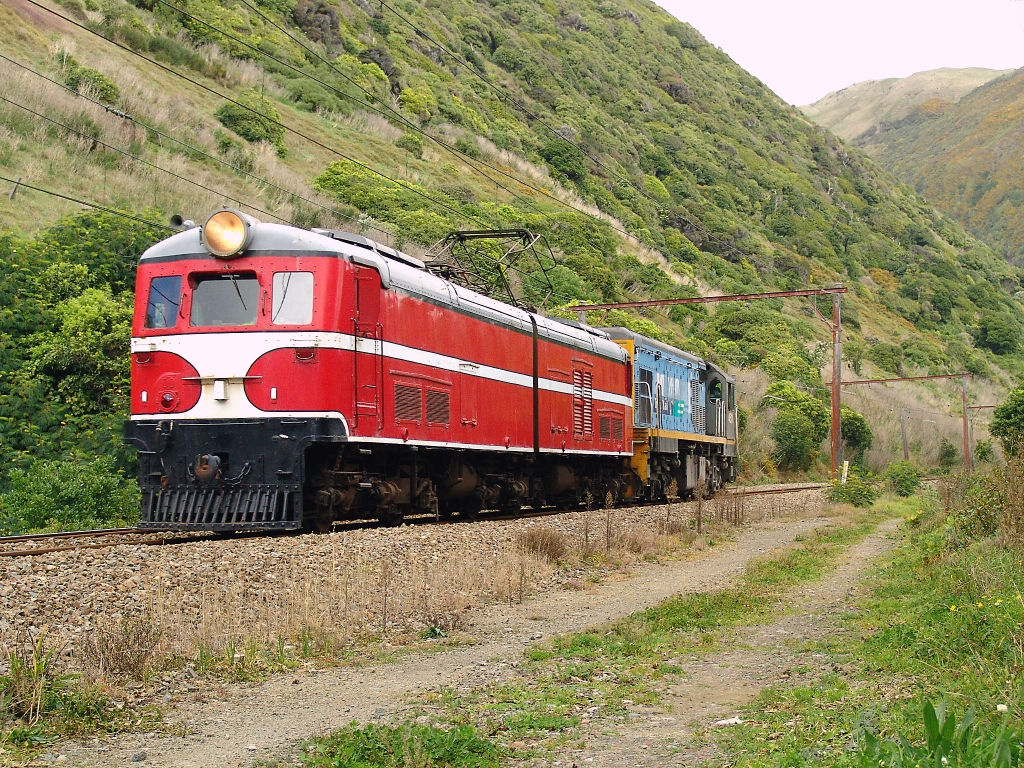
E^{W} & DC class locomotives descending to Paekakariki from the incline past Pukerua Bay, 21 August 2005

== History ==
The proposed route north of Wellington through Crofton (Ngaio), Khandallah, Johnsonville, Tawa (Flat), Porirua and Plimmerton was chosen in 1879 for the West Coast Railway to Palmerston North. by Government surveyors. The route, with work done on the section to Johnsonville was handed over to the WMR in 1882, after the new government of John Hall replaced that of George Grey and halted expenditure on the proposed line in 1881, wanting to concentrate on the Wairarapa Line.

The only alternative route north of Wellington to Kapiti and the Manawatu is Transmission Gully which is the route of the four-lane Transmission Gully Motorway. The Gully route was also suggested for the NIMT as part of the proposed Haywards-Plimmerton Line in the 1970s, retaining the existing route as a branch line for commuter traffic to Pukerua Bay or Muri.

The section north of Plimmerton was opened on 3 November 1886 with an official ceremony attended by the Governor at Otaihanga north of Paraparaumu. The first through freight train had already run from Longburn to Johnsonville on 30 October.

== Construction ==
The Paekakariki or No 16 Contract was 6.8 km or 4 miles and 16 chains in length, on an almost vertical cliff face breasting the sea, exposed to the prevailing north-west winds and drenched by sea spray. No road or rail access was possible. The contract was given to Samuel Brown. Construction of the southern section of the line was supervised by James Fulton, under Harry Higginson the chief engineer of the WMR.

Access was a problem; Brown built a temporary tramway along the beach from Pukerua Bay to just below No 13 tunnel on the wavecut platform at the cliff base. Material was sent by sea to Pukerua Bay. Once, injured men could not be removed for three days because of rough seas in Pukerua Bay before they could be sent to Wellington. A saddle-tank works locomotive “Belmont” plus two wagons and a van were lowered from above to the beach; they were also used for passengers and light goods. The track from Wellington reached Pukerua Bay and the Muri site at the end of 1885.

By 4 October 1886 the last two tunnels (No 11,12) were completed and tracks laid in them. The WMR chairman J E Nathan arranged a special train from Wellington with 120 passengers, and held a “laying the last brick” ceremony with a plaque in No 12 tunnel. The train could only go as far as Waikanae. On 27 October the last rail was laid near Waikanae.

There were five deaths during construction. On 18 January 1885 an earthquake caused a slip and the (No 8) tunnel caved in killing three men.

== Operation ==
1886 (February): the temporary tramway built by the contractor was used; passengers and their luggage and light goods were trans-shipped to a coach for Foxton waiting at Paekakariki; and (from 2 August 1886) to a coach for the railhead at Otaki.

1886: Line operational from 30 October; the official opening was on 3 November.

1940: electrification and CTC signalling installed; see also Kāpiti Line.

1945: Some Electric Multiple units (EMUs) used to provide commuter service to Paekakariki.

1962: Changes to CTC signalling installation.

1967: track in the tunnels was lowered, so that freight trains with D^{A} class diesel locomotives could run through to Wellington without an engine change to an electric loco at Paekakariki.

2011 (February): duplication (double-track) extended from Mackays Crossing to past Pukerua Bay and the beginning of the Paekakariki Escarpment section.

2011 (August): A serious slip near Kapiti closes the line and state highway.

2023 (May): An alarm system was cutover to monitor the 25-km section of line from Paekakiriki and Plimmerton, with monitoring equipment at 20 sites to warn of possible slips.

A short section of sharply-curved track north of Muri on the North–South Junction and the Tawa No 2 Tunnel are the only sections of the Wellington overhead power catenary system where for technical reasons a modern auto-tensioned overhead system could not be installed; the Hutt Valley Line and the Johnsonville Line were also upgraded in 2018–2021.

== Tunnels ==
There were originally six tunnels, but No 12 was bypassed and abandoned in 1900 after an accident and subsequent court case. They were subsequently given names by the NZR. Tunnels Nos 8–13, were renumbered to Nos 3–7 after the Tawa Flat Deviation opened in 1937 and bypassed the section to Johnsonville in 1938.

The first tunnel (No 8) took 28 weeks to build and there was an accident (see Accidents), but the others less; 10 weeks for No 10. For No 11 there was a cross drive in the middle and a turntable for spoil wagons, so three or 4 faces could be worked at once.

The shortest (No 13) was concrete lined, but Nos 8-12 were brick lined. Initially bricks were made at Paekakariki, and on the Muri station site 925m (46 chains) north of Pukerua Bay station. But they were unsuitable, so bricks were railed from Wellington, including some made in the prison.

The names of the tunnels and their length in feet and metres are: (Parsons says that Tunnel No 6 is 244m long, plus 14m extension at south end):

No.	later No.	Name	Length (ft)	Length (m)	Remarks
No.8	No 3	Pukerua	500	153	
No.9	No 4	St Kilda	952	278	
No.10	No 5	Sea View	612	186	
No.11	No 6	Brighton	801	244 + 14	
No.12	_	_	888	271	bypassed 1900
No.13	No 7	Neptune	192	59	

== Accidents ==
2024, 26 August - a rockfall near Pukerua bay was hit by a commuter train from Paekakariki. The train returned to Paekakariki. The line was blocked for several hours.

2022, 26 August - a slip blocked the Kāpiti Line between Pukerua Bay and Paekakariki on Friday morning between 6.10 am and 9.40 am. The section of State Highway 59 below the railway line was blocked for over a week.

On 17 August 2021 a landslip blocked the Kāpiti Line one kilometre south of the Fisherman's Table restaurant at the north end of the single-line section, and derailed a Matangi train. The single-track section had had one slip alarm, but not on the section of line where the slip occurred. The Matangi EMUs are expected to be take months to repair, at a cost of up to half a million dollars.

1989, 19 November - a three-coach southbound EMU derails after running into slip, north of Bean Pole Fence, on the single track section between Pukerua Bay & Paekakariki.

1979, October - Muri railway station; Signal 3132 at Muri was over-run by a diesel-hauled goods train (diesel locos was not fitted with trips) and was involved in a minor rear-end collision with an EMU commuter train; one of two commuter trains ahead.

1978, 25 May - Pukerua Bay, Wellington – D^{A} 1470, returning to Wellington light engine from Paekakariki, derailed on a curve due to excessive speed and almost fell onto State Highway 1 below the line; two killed.

1961, 19 September - between Pukerua Bay and Paekakariki, E^{W} No 1806 hauling a freight train was derailed by a fall of rock over the abandoned No 12 tunnel, just after the passing of the Auckland Express. E^{W} 1806 was nearly pushed over the bank to the road below, and was subsequently given an "A" grade overhaul; the first given to the class in ten years of service.

1940 - A fire in a carriage when the roof ventilator of a WMR carriage (NZR No A1106) contacted the overhead line in tunnel no 10 and caught fire, see NZR 50-foot carriage. The WMR carriages were higher the NZR loading gauge at 12 ft 2 1/2 in (3.721 m) rather than 11 ft 6 in (3.51 m), and were required to be tested before running on Government lines. But in 1940 a ventilator on A 1106 touched the new electric overhead line in tunnel 10, after which ex-WMR cars were restricted to the Hutt Line.

1911, 20 February - The Napier Express was approaching Paekakariki from the south, when a large boulder (15 cwt or 760 kg) dislodged from the Paekakariki Escarpment above rolled down onto a second class carriage, killing Miss Alice Power (23y) from Greymouth who was travelling with two friends.

1900, 24 February - A brick fell on the engine in No 12 tunnel, breaking a window. The injury to the driver's eye from broken glass resulted in a court case, and the driver (William McLeod) was awarded £1000 (or £750, according to Hoy & Parsons), plus £500 from the company's insurer. No 12 tunnel was subsequently closed and bypassed. The company had erected overhead chutes to catch falling stones.

1896, 23 June - outside No 13 tunnel engine No 13 hit a rock slip, and toppled down the embankment to the beach 25 ft below, taking with it four wagons of timber. Left on the track were five derailed wagons plus three passenger cars and the van at the rear. The loco was repaired and in service, although it is not known how it was recovered. The engine driver was also William McLeod.

1885–86; there were five deaths during construction, three on 18 January 1885 during construction of tunnel no 8 when an earthquake caused a slip and the tunnel caved in killing three men; Peter George, Henry Lloyd and Mathew Penzadeth or Pavzadetti (an Austrian). On one occasion injured men could not be removed for three days because of rough seas in Pukerua Bay.

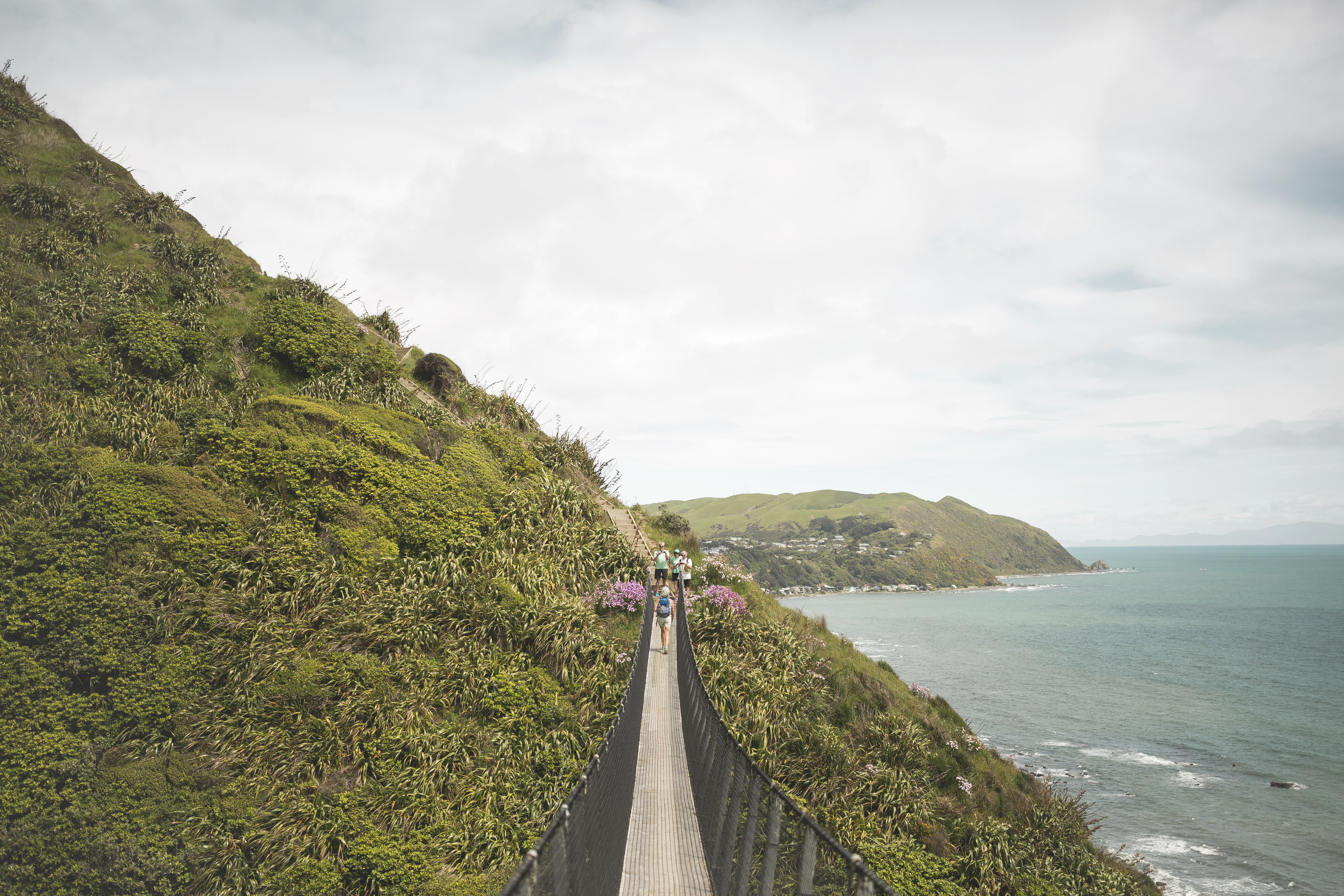
Swing bridge on the Escarpment Track

== Past improvements ==
1967: track in tunnels dropped so Da locomotives could run under the overhead wires

1940: line electrified (1500V DC) to Paekakariki; double-track installed as far as this section, and CTC installed, see Kāpiti Line.

If tablet control had been retained for this section instead of CTC, staffed signal cabins would have been required at each end i.e. at the North Junction and the South Junction.

1900: tunnel No 12 abandoned and bypassed after an accident. See Accidents.

== Future proposals ==
Double-tracking of this single-track section has been proposed a number of times. In the 1970s the Ministry of Works proposed a long tunnel underneath the Pukerua saddle. Double-tracking has been urged by the Greater Wellington Regional Council, which is keen to improve the speed and frequency of suburban commuter services. A single double track tunnel or twin tunnels has been suggested; see Kāpiti Line under "Future".

== See also ==
- Escarpment Track

=== Bibliography ===
- Brett, André; van der Weerden, Sam (2021). Can't Get There From Here - New Zealand Passenger Rail Since 1920. Otago University Press. ISBN 9781990048098.
- Cassells, Ken R. (1994). Uncommon Carrier - The History of the Wellington & Manawatu Railway Company, 1882-1908. Wellington: New Zealand Railway and Locomotive Society. ISBN 0908573634.
- Churchman, Geoffrey B. (1992). Danger Ahead – New Zealand Railway Accidents in the Modern Era. Sydney and Wellington: IPL Publishing Group. ISBN 0-908876-74-2.
- Heine, Richard W. (2000). Semaphore to CTC: Signalling and train working in New Zealand, 1863-1993. Wellington: New Zealand Railway & Locomotive Society. ISBN 0-908573-76-6.
- Hoy, Douglas G. (1970). Rails out of the Capital. Wellington: New Zealand Railway and Locomotive Society.
- Hoy, Douglas G. (1972). West of the Tararuas: An Illustrated History of the Wellington and Manawatu Railway Co. Dunedin: Southern Press.
- Parsons, David (2010). Wellington’s Railways: Colonial Steam to Matangi. Wellington: New Zealand Railway & Locomotive Society. ISBN 978-0-908573-88-2.
