= Ngā Uruora - Kāpiti Project =

Community conservation project

Ngā Uruora - Kāpiti Project is a community conservation project set up in Paekākāriki, New Zealand, in 1997 by Fergus Wheeler. It is named after the book Ngā Uruora / The Groves of Life: Ecology and History in a New Zealand Landscape by ecologist Geoff Park. The main aims of Ngā Ururoa are protecting and restoring the Kāpiti Coast's unique kohekohe (Didymocheton spectabilis) forest, re-establishing forests through planting programmes, and undertaking pest and weed control.

== Area ==
Ngā Uruora covers 292 hectares of coastal escarpment between Paekākāriki and Pukerua Bay. The land is owned by KiwiRail, and the QE II National Trust has a licence to undertake conservation projects. Ngā Uruora has an agreement with the QE II National Trust to undertake planting, weed and pest control on the escarpment.

The Paekākāriki–Pukerua Bay escarpment is located within the Cook Strait Ecological District. The dominant native vegetation is mingimingi (Coprosma propinqua), tauhinu (Ozothamnus leptophyllus) and coastal tree daisy (Olearia solandri), with scattered kanuka–karaka–kohekohe forest remnants.

== Biology ==
There are three biologically significant sites on the escarpment:

1. Site No. 2u: An area at the north end noted for exposed coastal vegetation and Coprosma propinqua, ngaio, karaka, and kawakawa shrubland. It is one of the few remaining regional examples of coastal cliff shrubland and could develop into a coastal forest if left undisturbed.
2. Site No. 2v: This is the major kohekohe, mahoe, and karaka shrubland remnant. It is a regionally representative example of coastal cliff vegetation.
3. Site No. 2t: The general escarpment, including coastal cliff pohuehue shrubland, plus pasture grassland and scattered karaka-kohekohe forest remnants.

Four species of native lizards have been identified on the escarpment as part of the Kāpiti Biodiversity Project: raukawa gecko (Woodworthia maculatus), northern grass skink (Oligosoma aff. polychroma), copper skink (Oligosoma aeneum), and the at-risk brown skink (Oligosoma zelandicum). Since 2017 weed clearance, habitat restoration, and rock-pile building has been undertaken to improve lizard habitat.

The native bird species present include New Zealand kingfisher (Todiramphus sanctus vagans), pied shag (Phalacrocorax varius varius), grey warbler (Gerygone igata), North Island fantail (Rhipidura fuliginosa placabilis), silvereye (Zosterops lateralis lateralis), harrier (Circus approximans), kererū (Hemiphaga novaeseelandiae), korimako (Anthornis melanura melanura), and New Zealand pipit (Anthus novaeseelandiae novaeseelandiae). Pipit are considered an at-risk species in New Zealand, and pied shags are nationally vulnerable.

== History of project ==
Ngā Ururoa was set up in 1997 by Fergus Wheeler. It was nominated for an award for "weedbusting excellence" by Weedbusters in 2012, and won the Wellington Community Trust Regional Heritage & Environment award in 2013. Ngā Uruora volunteer Peter Kentish of Paraparaumu won a Kāpiti Coast Civic Award in 2017 for his work.

The Paekākāriki-Pukerua Bay escarpment is home to the 10 km Escarpment Track; costing $1.4 million, this is the most expensive section of the entire national walkway network known as Te Araroa. Ngā Uruora was integral in getting the Escarpment Track established, as they had been using tracks through the area since 1997.

Ngā Uruora is a member of the Kāpiti Coast Biodiversity Project that received $294,000 by the Ministry for the Environment in 2015. They hope to create a virtually predator-free 16.5 square kilometre "mainland island" in Kāpiti. Ngā Uruora has a particular focus on restoring habitat for lizards and has an agreement with Department of Conservation to carry out a lizard protection trial. At the beginning of 2017 Ngā Uruora installed a community webcam at the top of Paekākāriki Hill Road overlooking the Kāpiti Coast.

In 2018 Ngā Uruora was one of the recipients of funding from the Radio New Zealand programme known as Critter of the Week. Ngā Uruora's conservation work with lizards featured on the Radio New Zealand Summer series programme in 2019.
