= Alan Gandell =

New Zealand public servant (1904–1988)

Sir Alan Thomas Gandell CBE (8 October 1904 – 10 July 1988) was the General Manager of New Zealand Railways from 1957 to 1966

== Early life and family ==
Gandell was born in Greymouth in 1904 and married Edna Marion Wallis (1906 – 1993) on 27 December 1933.

== Career ==
He joined as an engineering cadet in 1920 and qualified as a civil engineer. He was stationed in Auckland, Greymouth, Hamilton, Invercargill, Wanganui and Wellington.

He was appointed to the General Manager's personal staff in 1951. On 19 October 1955 Gandell was appointed a director of the New Zealand Railways Commission, and its general manager.

On 13 June 1956 Gandell and the Minister of Railways John McAlpine visited Clyde Engineering in Sydney, and subsequently Cabinet approved on 26 June 1956 a tender for ten D^{A} class locomotives from Clyde, to cost £NZ674,560. This was 6.6% above the Canadian price, but reference was made to the reciprocal trade agreement with Australia. Phil Holloway (Labour) asked a question in Parliament on 22 August 1956 about the extra cost.

In 1957, with the abolition of the Government Railways Commission, Gandell continued as General Manager of New Zealand Railways.

He reached 40 years in government service in 1960 when Government servants were normally required to retire on a pension from the Government Superannuation Fund. He was given a three-year extension and a second three-year extension in 1963.

== Retirement ==
Latterly and in retirement he was on the New Zealand Ports Authority and the Government Railways Industrial Tribunal.

He retired on 31 October 1966. He said in a speech to the Institute of Transport conference in November 1966 that there had to be some way of supporting from "national funds" uneconomic but desirable services e.g. urban passenger transport.

In 1977 he was made a member of the Order of St John by the Queen for services to the Order.

He died in Wellington in 1988, and was cremated at Karori.
