= KPL =

The term/acronym KPL may refer to:

== People ==
- Kevin Pierre-Louis (born 1991), American football player

== Libraries ==
- Kalamazoo Public Library, district library in Kalamazoo, Michigan
- Kenosha Public Library, public library of the city of Kenosha, Wisconsin
- Kewanee Public Library, National Register of Historic Places listings in Henry County, Illinois
- Kitchener Public Library, public library system for the city of Kitchener, Ontario

== Organizations ==
- Kappa Phi Lambda, Asian American sorority
- Khaosan Pathet Lao, the Lao News Agency
- Korean Peasants League, NGO whose members are South Korean farmers
- Körber PaperLink, in Hamburg, Germany, holding company for the Körber Group's Paper Division
- Communist Party of Luxembourg, communist political party in Luxembourg

== Sports ==
- Karnataka Premier League, Indian Twenty20 cricket league
- Kazakhstan Premier League, top division football league in Kazakhstan
- Kenyan Premier League, top division football league in Kenya
- Kerala Premier League, Indian Football league in Kerala
- Kashmir Premier League (Pakistan), 20-over cricket league in Pakistan
- Kashmir Premier League (India), 20-over cricket league in India
- Kurdistan Premier League, top division football league in Kurdistan
- Kuwait Premier League, top division football league in Kuwait
- Kyrgyz Premier League, top division football league in Kyrgyzstan

== Other uses ==
- Kāpiti Line (timetable code: KPL), New Zealand
- Keilor Plains railway station, Melbourne
- Kilometers per liter, a form of fuel efficiency
