= Paekākāriki railway station =

Railway station in New Zealand

Paekākāriki
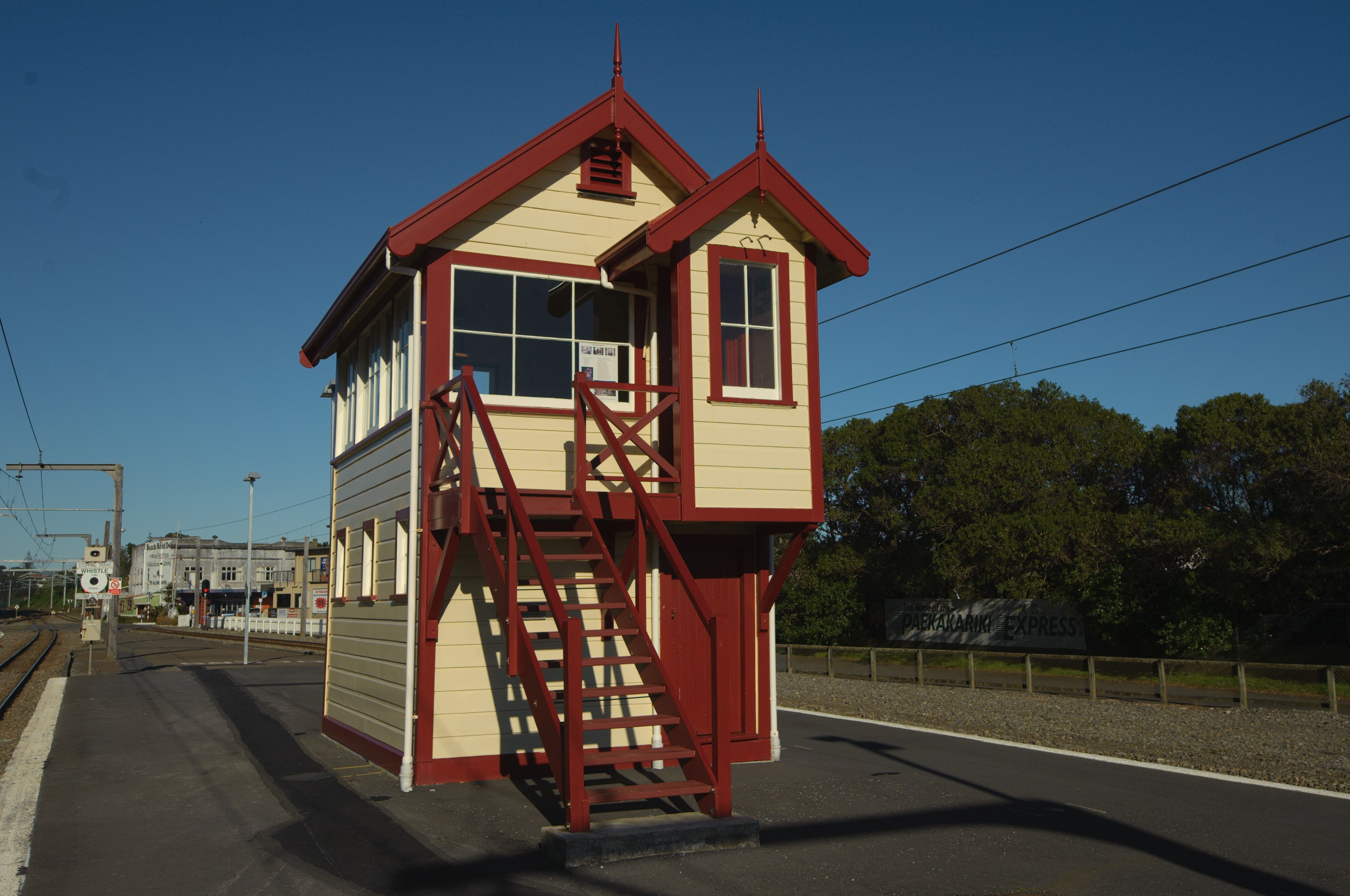
- Signal House, Paekākāriki railway station on 22 September 2012.

General information
- Location: Robertson Road, Paekākāriki, New Zealand
- Coordinates: 40°59′14″S 174°57′16″E
- System: Metlink suburban rail
- Owner: Greater Wellington Regional Council
- Line: North Island Main Trunk
- Platforms: Island Platform
- Tracks: Mainline (2)

Construction
- Parking: Yes
- Cycle facilities: Yes

Other information
- Fare zone: 8
- Classification: RHTNZ Category B building

History
- Opened: 3 November 1886
- Electrified: 24 July 1940

Services
Preceding station	Transdev Wellington	Following station
Paraparaumu towards Waikanae	Kāpiti Line	Pukerua Bay towards Wellington

Heritage New Zealand – Category 1
- Official name: Paekakariki Railway Yard Water Vats and Signal Box
- Designated: 25-Sep-1986
- Reference no.: 4705 and 4706

Heritage New Zealand – Category 2
- Official name: Paekakariki railway station and Goods Shed
- Designated: 29-Nov-1985
- Reference no.: 4959 and 4961
Location

Paekākāriki railway station in Paekākāriki on the Kāpiti Coast, New Zealand, is an intermediate station on the Kāpiti Line for Metlink's electric multiple unit commuter trains from Wellington. Paekākāriki was the terminal station of the commuter service from 1940 to 1983, when the service was extended to Paraparaumu, and to Waikanae in 2011.

The station was opened in 1886. Initially, banking locomotives were attached at Paekākāriki for the steep "hill" up to Pukerua Bay and steam locomotives were changed there for electric locomotives to Wellington from 1940 to the 1960s.

The large wooden station building on an island platform is used by a museum, and has a bookshop run by Irving Lipshaw and Michael O’Leary in one section. There are a restored signal box and a level crossing at the south end.

Steam Incorporated has taken over most of the rail yard for rail preservation.

Several buildings are listed by the New Zealand Historic Places Trust, as Category I (signal box and water vats) or Category II (station and goods shed) The station and yard is a historic area.

== Services ==
Paekākāriki is the second station before Waikanae, the northern terminus on the Kāpiti Line, for commuter trains operated by Transdev Wellington under the Metlink brand contracted to the Greater Wellington Regional Council. Services between Wellington and Porirua or Waikanae are operated by electric multiple units of the FT/FP class (Matangi). Two diesel-hauled carriage trains, the Capital Connection and the Northern Explorer, pass through the station but do not stop.

Travel times by train are 14 minutes to Waikanae, 15 minutes to Porirua, 46 minutes to Wellington for trains stopping at all stations and 41 minutes for express trains that do not stop between Porirua and Wellington. Trains run every 20 minutes during daytime off-peak hours, more frequently during peak periods, and less frequently at night. Before July 2018, off-peak passenger train services between Wellington and Waikanae ran every 30 minutes but were increased to one every 20 minutes from 15 July 2018. Off-peak trains stop at all stations between Wellington and Waikanae. During peak periods, some trains from Wellington that stop at all stations may terminate at Porirua and return to Wellington while a number of peak services run express or non-stop between Wellington and Porirua before stopping at all stations from Porirua to Waikanae. All services running between Waikanae and Wellington stop at Paekākāriki.

Northern Explorer trains and diesel-hauled KiwiRail freight trains pass by the station but do not stop, except that southbound freight trains may stop to attach banking engines.

== History ==
The railway from Wellington to Paekākāriki opened on 3 November 1886 as part of the Wellington-Manawatu Line built by the Wellington and Manawatu Railway Company (WMR).

Before 1905, the name was spelt Paikakariki. The official name of the town was changed to Paekākāriki (with macrons) by the New Zealand Geographic Board on 21 June 2019.

The first Auckland - Wellington through expresses ran on 14 February 1909, taking 19 hours 13 minutes, and stopping at Paekākāriki.

Following the completion of the Tawa Flat deviation on 19 June 1937, electrification of the railway from Wellington to Paekākāriki was completed on 24 July 1940 allowing electric locomotive-hauled commuters carriage trains to operate between Wellington and Paekakariki. DM/D class multiple units were introduced in the 1950s and replaced most locomotive-hauled carriage trains.

From the completion of the electrification to Paekākāriki in 1940, steam locomotives were not permitted to work south of Paekākāriki due to the smoke nuisance in the long tunnels on the Tawa Flat deviation. Long-distance passenger and freight trains were hauled by ED and EW class electric locomotives between Wellington and Paekākāriki where the locomotives were changed from electric to steam. During the 1950s, steam locomotives were progressively replaced by diesel-electric locomotives for long distance trains, but locomotives continued to be changed at Paekākāriki because the new DA class diesel locomotives were initially unable to operate south of Paekakariki due to the limited clearances in the tunnels between Pukerua Bay and Paekākāriki. Work was undertaken to lower the floors of these tunnels to improve clearances and from the 1960s diesel locomotives were able to work south of Paekākāriki and locomotive changes at Paekākāriki became unnecessary. However, electric locomotives were kept at Paekākāriki to bank trains that needed assistance on the steep grade from Paekākāriki to Pukerua Bay. In the 1980s, the purchase of additional multiple units and more powerful diesel locomotives allowed the electric locomotives to be withdrawn from service.

A deviation was built around Tunnel 12 in the early 1900s and a fence to protect from landslides was built after a derailment in 1980.

Electrification was extended north of Paekākāriki to Paraparaumu: the section officially opened on 7 May 1983 allowing the extension of suburban commuter service to Paraparaumu which became the new northern terminal for suburban commuter services. Before 1983 there were buses from Paekākāriki to Paraparaumu and Raumati.

The station previously had a refreshment room and a steam locomotive depot. The refreshment room closed when it became unnecessary to stop trains to change locomotives at Paekākāriki. Locomotives were changed or a banker locomotive added for the steep bank up to Pukerua Bay, and from 1940 it was the southern terminal station for steam locomotives. Previously there was a signal box at each end of the station, a two-road shed with water, coal and oil facilities, a turntable, and (until Wellington Airport was opened) a rail/air freight depot for Paraparaumu Airport.

The Paekakariki Station Precinct Trust works "to acquire, develop, and administer the venue of the Railway Station Precinct at Paekākāriki for recreational, historical preservation, tourism, and educational purposes, and for other allied or supporting activity".

== See also ==
- North–South Junction
