= Paekakariki Station Precinct Trust =

Railway preserving organisation

Coordinates: 40.9872°S 174.9543°E

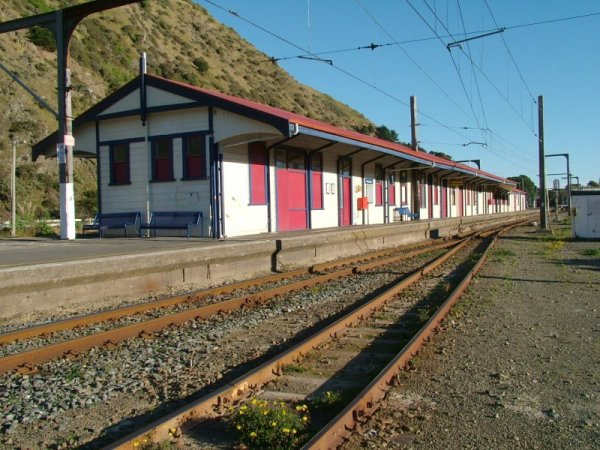
Paekakariki Railway Station, home to the Paekakariki Station Museum

The Paekakariki Station Precinct Trust works "to acquire, develop, and administer the venue of the Railway Station Precinct at Paekākāriki for recreational, historical preservation, tourism, and educational purposes, and for other allied or supporting activity".

== History ==
On 13 August 1993, the Paekakariki Station Precinct Trust was formally registered as a charitable trust. With support from the Department of Labour Employment services and the Kāpiti Coast Development and Promotion Company, Ltd and local groups, the trust developed quickly. It had two original purposes: restoration of the station building and of the signal box, with re-location to the original site.

With the help of the Rail Heritage Trust, the station floor boards have been completely renewed and the building repaired. The flooring job was a major task, as it was discovered that the station had been built with the floor lying straight on top of the dirt. There was no space for air circulation or drainage. Before the floor boards could be laid, the whole area had to be dug out, with large amounts of dirt being removed to allow for adequate space underneath the floor boards. The original wall, floors, and ceiling were beautifully constructed in native tongue and groove timber. All wiring, including underfloor, was completely renewed and new plumbing installed, with the addition of three new toilets.

The Paekakariki Station Precinct Trust is very fortunate, having also obtained grants from the tourism board, trust bank, and lotteries Board, which will enable completion of the Station interior.

== Paekakariki Station Museum ==
The Paekakariki Station Museum, which opened in 1995, is located in the Historic Paekakariki Railway Station building on the main platform adjacent to State Highway 1. The museum has displays of local Maori and Heritage items along with sections devoted to Railways and the Marines' occupation of the McKays Crossing area during World War II.
