= New Zealand DA class locomotive =

Former class of Locomotive

New Zealand DA class
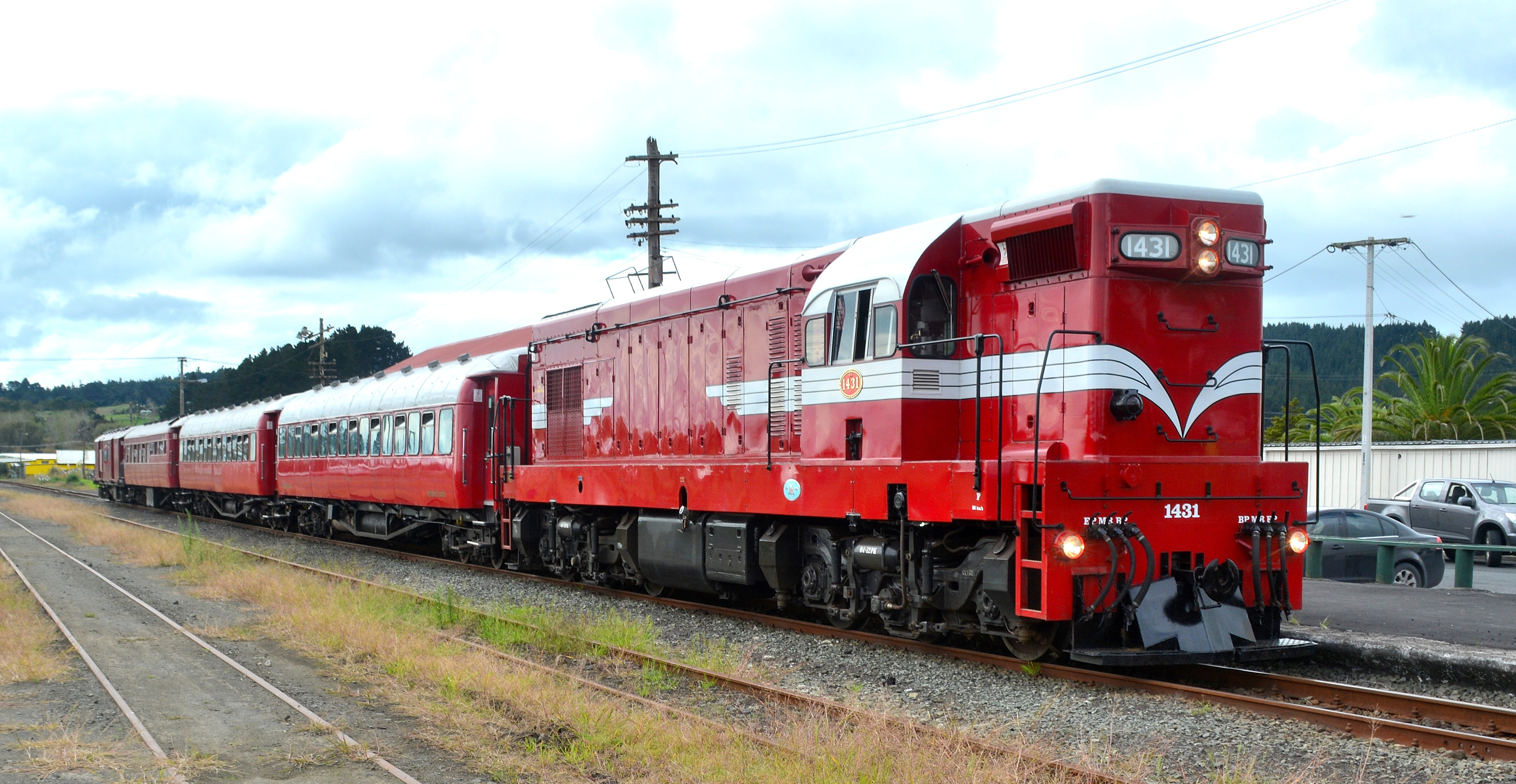
- D^{A} 1431 (DA345) at Helensville in 2017 on an excursion.
Type and origin
- Power type: Diesel-electric
- Builder: General Motors Diesel (Canada); Electro-Motive Division (USA); Clyde Engineering (Australia)
- Model: EMD G12
- Build date: 1955 - 1967
Specifications
- Configuration
  - UIC: A1A-A1A
- Gauge: 3 ft 6 in (1,067 mm)
- Length: GMD/EMD 14.1 metres (46 ft 3 in); Clyde 14.6 metres (47 ft 11 in)
- Adhesive weight: 59.0 tonnes (58.1 long tons; 65.0 short tons)
- Loco weight: GMD/EMD 81.0 tonnes (79.7 long tons; 89.3 short tons); Clyde 79.0 tonnes (77.8 long tons; 87.1 short tons)
- Fuel type: Diesel
- Prime mover: EMD 12-567C and EMD 12-567E
- RPM range: 835 rpm
- Engine type: V12 Diesel engine
- Aspiration: Roots type supercharger
- Displacement: 111.49 L (6,804 cu in)
- Traction motors: Four EMD D19 or D29
- Cylinders: 12
- Cylinder size: 216 mm × 254 mm (8.5 in × 10.0 in)
Performance figures
- Maximum speed: 100 km/h (62 mph)
- Power output: 1,060 kW (1,420 hp)
- Tractive effort: 140 kN (31,000 lb_{f})
Career
- Numbers: D^{A} 1400–1545 (original); DA 11–996 (TMS)
- First run: 3 September 1955 - November 1967
- Last run: 23 March 1977 - February 1989
- Current owner: Museum of Transport & Technology; Steam Incorporated; Dean McQuoid; Feilding and District Steam Rail Society
- Disposition: 85 rebuilt as DC Class; 6 as D^{AA} (defunct), 1 as DAR517 (scrapped), 6 preserved (4 in service on heritage or excursion trains, 1 under restoration, 1 on static display)

The New Zealand DA class locomotive (Note: Following the introduction of Traffic Monitoring System (TMS) in 1979, the class classification was capitalised, whereas previously the second letter was a smaller capital letter, that is D^{A}) is a class of diesel-electric mainline locomotives operated on the New Zealand railway system between 1955 and 1989. Consisting of 146 locomotives, it is the most numerous class to ever operate in New Zealand, with five more locomotives in service than the A^{B} class steam locomotive.

The class is an A1A-A1A version of the Electro-Motive Diesel (EMD) G12 model, with the design altered slightly to run on New Zealand's 3 ft 6 in (1,067 mm) rail system, and fit the small loading gauge. They were introduced between 1955 and 1967 in three phases, and were the first class of diesel locomotives to seriously displace steam traction.

Between 1978 and 1983, 85 locomotives were rebuilt as the DC class, of which some are still in use. All but one of the remaining locomotives were withdrawn by 1989, with six preserved. The last locomotive was refitted for shunting duties and was rebuilt as DAR517.

== Introduction ==
The D^{A} class have their origins in the post World War II period. Like most nations, New Zealand's dominant form of railway traction was steam, with electrification being used in Wellington, the Christchurch - Lyttleton Line and through the Otira Tunnel. The General Manager of the New Zealand Railways (NZR), Frank Aickin, was an advocate for electrifying the entire North Island Main Trunk (NIMT) to alleviate the shortage of coal and the cost of importing diesel fuel; though he also recognised that steam or diesel traction would be required on other lines.

Aickin went as far as negotiating a supply contract in 1946, but fell out with the government in 1951 and retired. His successor, Horace Lusty, terminated the contract. After a disappointing experience with the D^{F} class locomotives, and facing significant capacity issues on the NIMT, NZR entered into an agreement with General Motors for the supply of 30 G12 model locomotives following a tender process. Designated by NZR as the D^{A} class, one of the major appeals was the guarantee of delivery within five months. They were the first locomotives supplied from the United States of America since the A^{A} class of 1914. With two production lines at London, Ontario and La Grange, Illinois two locomotives were completed every three days. At the time, they were the highest and widest locomotives ever used in New Zealand.

=== Phase I ===
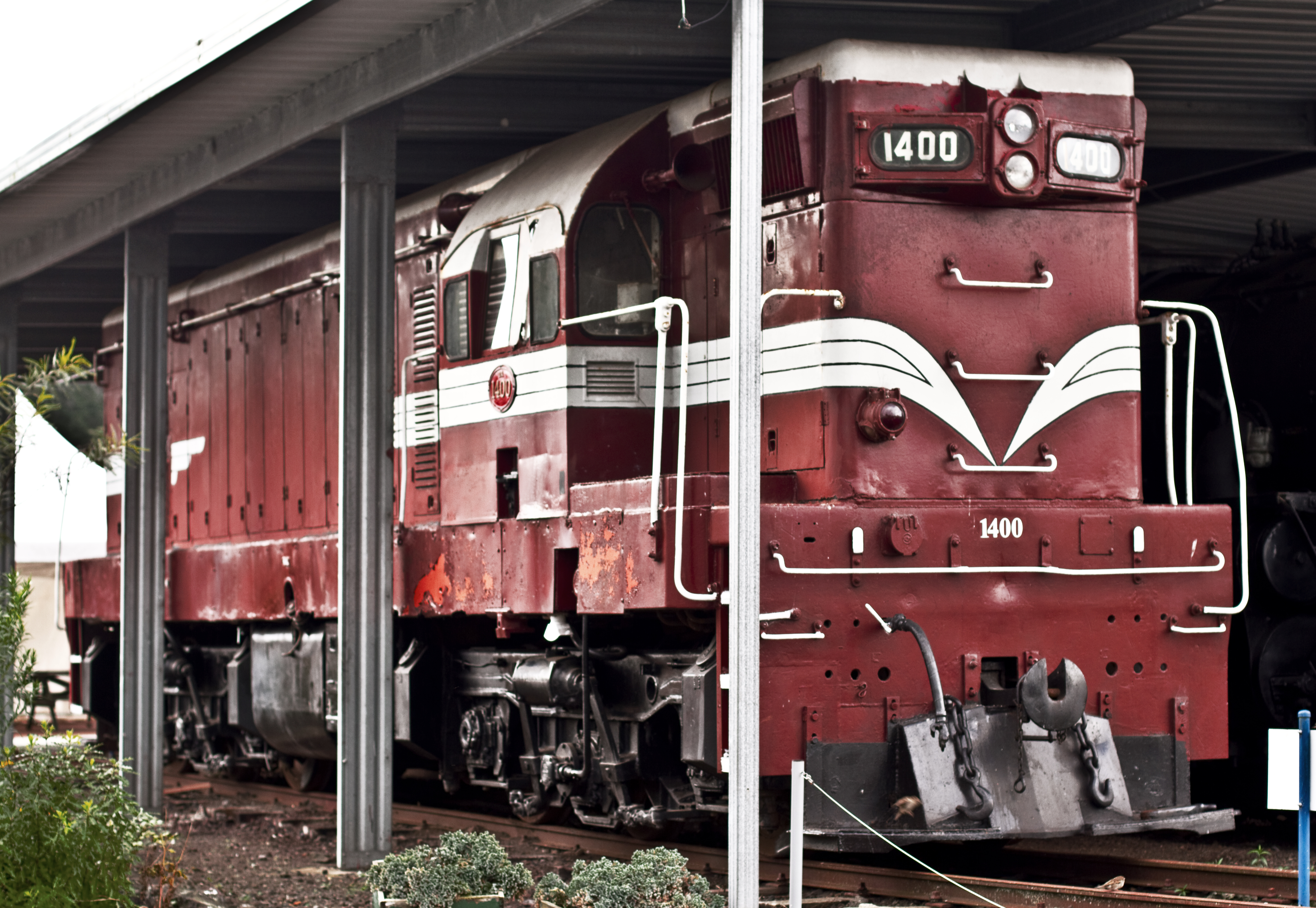
D^{A} 1400 on static display at MOTAT in 2011. This was the first D^{A} class locomotive in service, and is therefore a Phase I locomotive.

This first batch of 30 locomotives were built by EMD, with 15 built at their Canadian subsidiary General Motors Diesel in London, Ontario, and 15 built at their La Grange, Illinois plant.

Known as Phase I, (D^{A} 1400–1429) entered service between August 1955 and January 1956.

=== Phase II ===
A second batch of ten locomotives (D^{A} 1430–1439) were built by Clyde Engineering in Sydney and entered service during 1957. The Australian-built locomotives, which became known as Phase II, differed from the Phase I locomotives in having a shunter's refuge at the No. 2 end, and were 1’ 6’’ (0.46 m) longer between bogie centres, with slight additional weight. The locomotives featured cast-steel bogies manufactured by Dofasco in Canada. The phase I locomotives were delivered with fabricated bogies, these were later replaced with Dofasco bogies as well.

The order was approved by Cabinet on 26 June 1956 on Clyde Engineering for ten D^{A} class locomotives, to cost £NZ674,560. This followed a visit to Clyde in Sydney on 13 June 1956 by the Minister of Railways John McAlpine and the NZR General Manager Alan Gandell. The price was assessed as 6.6% above the Canadian price, but reference was made to the reciprocal trade agreement with Australia. Phil Holloway (Labour) asked a question in Parliament on 22 August 1956 about the extra cost.

=== Phase III ===
Three further batches were ordered, all supplied by General Motors Diesel, London, Ontario. The first 12 locomotives (D^{A} 1440–1451) were dubbed as Phase III and entered service in August 1961. The Phase III locomotives were the same length as Phase I, but with different headlight arrangement. This order saw the end of steam traction in the North Island. The 52 Phase III locomotives entered service from 1961 to 1964.

=== Phase IV ===
In 1966, NZR again reviewed its motive power needs and went to tender, again selecting the G12 as the best option. Between 1966 and 1967, 54 D^{A} class locomotives entered service, known as Phase IV. The main difference between the Phase III and Phase IV locomotives was the use of the EMD 567E engine. This order took the total number in the D^{A} class to 146. Only Phase III and Phase IV locomotives were selected for rebuilding into the DC class locomotives from 1978 onwards.

At the same time the final D^{A} class order was made, an order for smaller and lighter D^{B} class locomotives was also placed with EMD. The D^{B} class were used on lightly laid secondary lines where the D^{A} class were unable to be used.

== In service ==
The class operated in the North Island. To facilitate their fast delivery a greater loading gauge was accepted meaning that initially they could only operate on the NIMT from Auckland to Paekakariki, and the Rotorua, Kinleith and Tokoroa branches. They were excluded from operating on many branch lines on account of their weight, and were restricted in their operations on the East Coast Main Trunk (ECMT) beyond Paeroa due to the lightly laid line through the Karangahake and Athenree gorges. Instead the lighter D^{F} and D^{B} class locomotives handled traffic on this line. These restrictions were reduced as bridges were progressively strengthened, and in the case of the ECMT with the opening of the Kaimai Tunnel in 1978.

Their axle loading was 14.8 tonnes (14.6 long tons; 16.3 short tons). The first (1955) locomotives had fabricated bogies welded from steel pressings and because of the roll on curves were restricted to goods service. Later batches (from D^{A} 1440) had Dofasco cast steel bogies with an improved spring layout and were suitable for express working.

The class were also unable initially to reach Wellington via the NIMT, as the tunnels south of Paekākāriki built in the 1880s by the Wellington and Manawatu Railway Company did not have enough clearance under the 1500V DC Wellington suburban electrification overhead wires. The operational practice remained the same as it had in the steam age, with an exchange with ED and EW class electric locomotives taking place at Paekakariki. The tunnel floors were lowered south of Paekakariki in 1967 and the D^{A} class could then operate all the way through to Wellington. Access to Wellington before this time for the D^{A} class could only be achieved via the Wairarapa line and the Rimutaka Tunnel.

The D^{A} class were employed on all the major lines in the North Island: the NIMT, Marton-New Plymouth, Palmerston North-Gisborne and North Auckland lines. The success of the D^{A} class in its reliability and performance meant that it was the major factor allowing the withdrawal of North Island steam locomotives by 1967. The class were successful in raising the freight capacity of the NIMT. The main limitation was the Raurimu Spiral, where a pair of D^{A} class locomotives could haul 650 tonnes up the grade compared to 595 tonnes for their K^{A} class steam predecessors.

The class hauled all manner of freight and passenger services, including the Scenic Daylight service on the NIMT. The prestigious Silver Star overnight sleeper train was initially hauled by a pair of D^{A} class locomotives when it was introduced in 1971. A dedicated pool of locomotives - D^{A}s 1520-1527 and later joined by 1528 - were used for this service.

The need for a more powerful locomotive that could haul longer and heavier trains on the NIMT had been identified, and in 1972 the first 15 D^{X} class locomotives were introduced. While a single D^{X} produced 70 kW less than a pair of D^{A} class locomotives, it weighed 97.5 tonnes compared to the combined weight of two D^{A} class at 162 tonnes, which combined with more powered axles gave better traction and higher power to weight ratio.

The Silver Star service was later transferred to the D^{X} class, while the Scenic Daylight service had earlier been replaced by the Blue Streak railcars. The introduction of further D^{X} class locomotives in 1975-76 ended the dominance of the D^{A} class on the NIMT. Locomotives were also employed on the Auckland suburban network, hauling 56-foot carriages.

The 40 locomotives that were not converted to the DC class continued in service throughout most of the 1980s. The combination of the deregulation of land transport and the decline in rail freight volumes, reduced inter-regional passenger numbers, and the electrification of the NIMT saw them become surplus to requirements. Due to tunnel clearance problems on North Auckland Line through the Makarau Tunnel which prevented DC locomotives working in Northland, twelve DA class locomotives were given an "A grade" overhaul in 1980 with some modifications to improve crew comfort. They were painted in International Orange colours at the same time.

=== Numbering ===
The D^{A} class established the initial numbering practice for NZR diesel locomotives, numbering the locomotives sequentially with the class leader numbered in reference to the locomotives horsepower. While the locomotives were actually rated at 1425 hp, numbering started at 1400 and continued up to 1545.

In 1979 the computerised Traffic Monitoring System (TMS) was introduced, with the remaining members of the class renumbered in sequence and the classification capitalised. Because this took place during the DC rebuild programme some locomotives received a new DA series number before being withdrawn for conversion, upon which they received a new DC class number. Under the numbering D^{A} 1400 became DA11 and D^{A} 1516 became DA996, prior to it being rebuilt into DC4830.

=== Livery ===
From their introduction, the class were painted in an overall deep red colour described as New Zealand Government Railways red. White or silver stripes were added along much of the length of the body, culminating in wings on each end.

The locomotives redesignated as D^{AA} received gold stripes to differentiate them from other D^{A} and D^{B} class locomotives. Following the introduction of TMS many had their new road numbers applied to the long hood.

During the 1980s some locomotives were repainted in the International Orange livery (red sides, grey upper and lower surfaces and yellow safety ends) then being applied to other NZR locomotives, with the road number applied in large white type on the long hood. Many locomotives were retired still wearing the original NZR red.

== Conversions and rebuilds ==
=== D^{AA} class ===
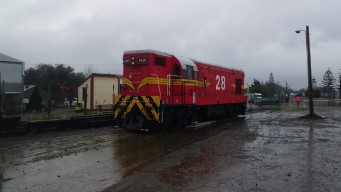
D^{AA} 1401 (DA28) in preservation at Feilding Railway Depot. Note the yellow stripes instead of white, distinguishing the D^{AA}s from the D^{A}s.

In 1970, locomotives D^{A} 1400-04 and 1406 were withdrawn from mainline duties and reassigned as heavy shunters to work in the new Te Rapa hump yard. The locomotives were reclassified as the D^{AA} class. They received additional low-speed controls to assist in these operations, special in-cab Signals to indicate "faster", "slower", "maintain power" and "stop" for drivers linked back to the grid control tower by VHF radio, and a separate VHF radio channel for voice communication to the control tower.

These locomotives were identifiable by their yellow hood stripes, which were treated to denote them as being used in special service apart from the D^{A} class.

The locomotives were later superseded by the DSG and DSJ class shunting locomotives, which were purpose-built for shunting as opposed to the D^{AA} class being converted for that purpose. D^{AA} 1400 (formerly D^{A} 1400) was written off in November 1983 due to generator damage, being replaced by DA68, DA28 was out of service from February 1986 and the remaining four locomotives were withdrawn in February 1988.

Two D^{AA} class locomotives have been preserved. On its withdrawal in 1983, D^{AA} 1400 was cosmetically restored as D^{A} 1400 and donated to the Museum of Transport & Technology (MOTAT) in Auckland. Placed on static display at MOTAT's Great North Road site, it was moved in late 2014 to MOTAT's Meola Road site to make way for an upgraded pavilion surrounding steam locomotive K 900. It is significant as the first of the D^{A} class to have been built.

The other, D^{AA} 1401 (TMS DA28) was withdrawn in 1986 and forwarded to Sims Metal-PMI scrapyard at Otahuhu. In 1988, the locomotive was purchased by enthusiast Tony Bachelor, who moved it around various homes in the Auckland area as part of his Pacific Rail Trust. In 1999 it was leased to Tranz Rail, but received little use and was stored at Hutt Workshops. In 2005, the locomotive was re-activated, and in 2007, it was loaned to Feilding and District Steam Rail Society after the lease agreement with Tranz Rail and Toll Rail. D^{A} 1401 was gifted to the Feilding and District Steam Rail Society in 2008, who are planning its eventual restoration. (Note: Despite being nominally operational, D^{A} 1401 will require some remedial work before it can run on the mainline.)

=== DC class ===
In 1977, NZR decided to rebuild 30 of the later Phase III GM Canada-built D^{A} class locomotives into the EMD G22AR model to become the D^{C} class. Over seven years, 80 were rebuilt by Clyde Engineering in Adelaide, while a further five were rebuilt at Hutt Workshops using a mixture of components built at Hutt and Clyde. The first few were shipped directly to Port Adelaide, but after the Union Company withdrew its roll-on/roll-off services, most were shipped to Melbourne's Appleton Dock and hauled to Adelaide via the 1,600 mm (5 ft 3 in) Victorian and South Australian lines.

Only one of the final batch of 54 Phase III D^{A} class locomotives was not rebuilt - D^{A} 1517 had been scrapped in 1974 due to damage sustained when it ran into a landslip at the entrance to the Fordell tunnel in 1973. Two locomotives - D^{A}s 1533 and 1470 were both rebuilt from heavily damaged conditions sustained in accidents running light engine. 1533 was damaged in an accident while returning from National Park on banking duty in 1975; due to a rivalry between locomotive drivers at Taumarunui depot, the locomotive entered a curve much too fast and overturned, killing the locomotive engineer. D^{A} 1470 derailed on the steep Pukerua Bay section in 1978, returning to Wellington due to speeding on a curve, and nearly ended up on State Highway 1 below the line; both of the crew were killed.

Ten of the Phase III locomotives were not rebuilt.

Many of the DC class remain in service today with ownership held by KiwiRail. Several were leased to Auckland Transport. One, DC 4588, was exported to Tasmania in 1999, but found to be unsuccessful and was withdrawn from service in October 2002 with serious motor problems. After a long period of inactivity, the locomotive, which had been partway through a rebuild to make it more suitable for Tasmanian conditions, was sold for scrap by TasRail in mid-2011.

=== DAR class ===
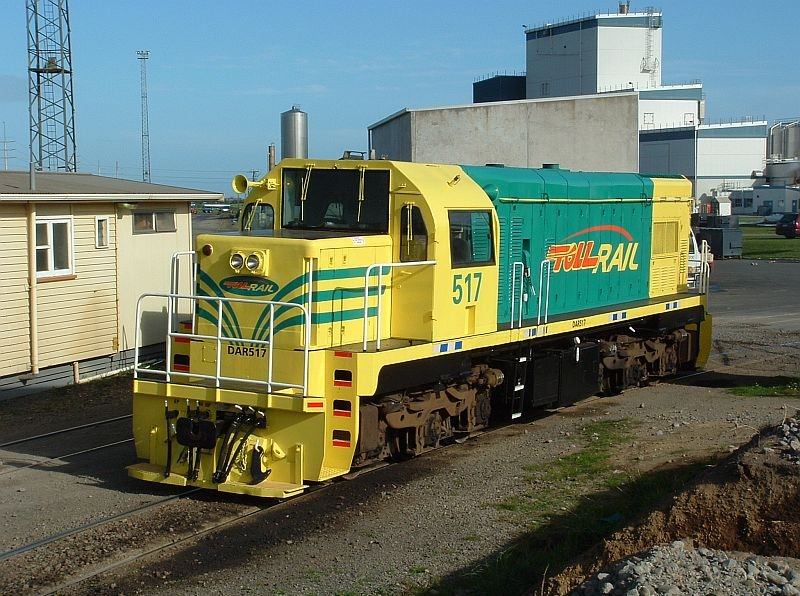
DAR517, in Toll Rail livery, at Whareroa near Hāwera on 13 January 2006

In 1989, Tasman Pulp & Paper was looking to replace their resident Kawerau shunting locomotive, Bagnall 0-6-0DM N^{O} 3079. This locomotive had been rebuilt in the late 1970s with a new Caterpillar D343T diesel engine and torque converter to make it more effective as a heavy shunter, but due to increases in traffic, was no longer able to keep up.

NZR initially offered a DH class locomotive as a replacement. Tasman did not feel the locomotive would be up to the task. (Note: In more recent years, the DH class has occasionally worked at Kawerau and has been able to keep up with demands.) At the same time, NZR was withdrawing the last DA class locomotives, and the decision was made to offer DA512 as a new heavy shunter.

The locomotive was altered by chopping the front hood containing the dynamic brake components and altering the cab for better forward visibility. It was painted in Tasman's orange-brown colours before it entered service at Kawerau. This allowed the Bagnall to be withdrawn, and later scrapped after being offered to the Bay of Islands Vintage Railway.

In 1998, Tasman decided to sell its locomotive back to Tranz Rail, who would then take over the duties of shunting the Kawerau yard with more conventional shunting locomotives. DA512 was sold to Tranz Rail Limited who immediately moved it to Hutt Workshops for further alterations to make it more suitable as a heavy shunting locomotive. This included fitting shunter's refuges at either end of the locomotive and extended drawgear to accommodate the extra length of the refuges, as well as a repaint in the then-current "Cato Blue" livery.

Renumbered as DAR517, the locomotive was released from Hutt in 1999 and allocated to the Kiwi Dairies milk factory at Whareroa, near Hāwera. Here, it replaced ex-NZR Bagnall DSA 414 (D^{SA} 240, the sub-class leader) as the resident shunting locomotive. It was repainted in the Toll Rail "Corn Cob" colours in 2005, but was withdrawn from service in September 2008 for an overhaul and was placed in storage at Hutt Workshops. The locomotive was scrapped in December 2017.

== Withdrawal ==
With the lack of ongoing operational requirements and the age of the locomotives that were not rebuilt themselves the number of locomotives was reduced throughout the 1980s. Most of the first batch delivered were withdrawn by the end of 1986. By 19 December 1987 18 DA class locomotives were still in service, with the majority (12) being in service for use on the North Auckland Line.

In March 1988 the Railways Corporation began progressively introducing single-manning of trains. The DA class, along with the DJ class, were deemed to be not suitable for single-manning due to their cab configuration. By April 1989 only one DA class locomotive, DA512, remained.

Following their withdrawal, most locomotives were taken to Hutt for scrapping during the early 1990s, though a few were scrapped elsewhere.

== Preservation ==
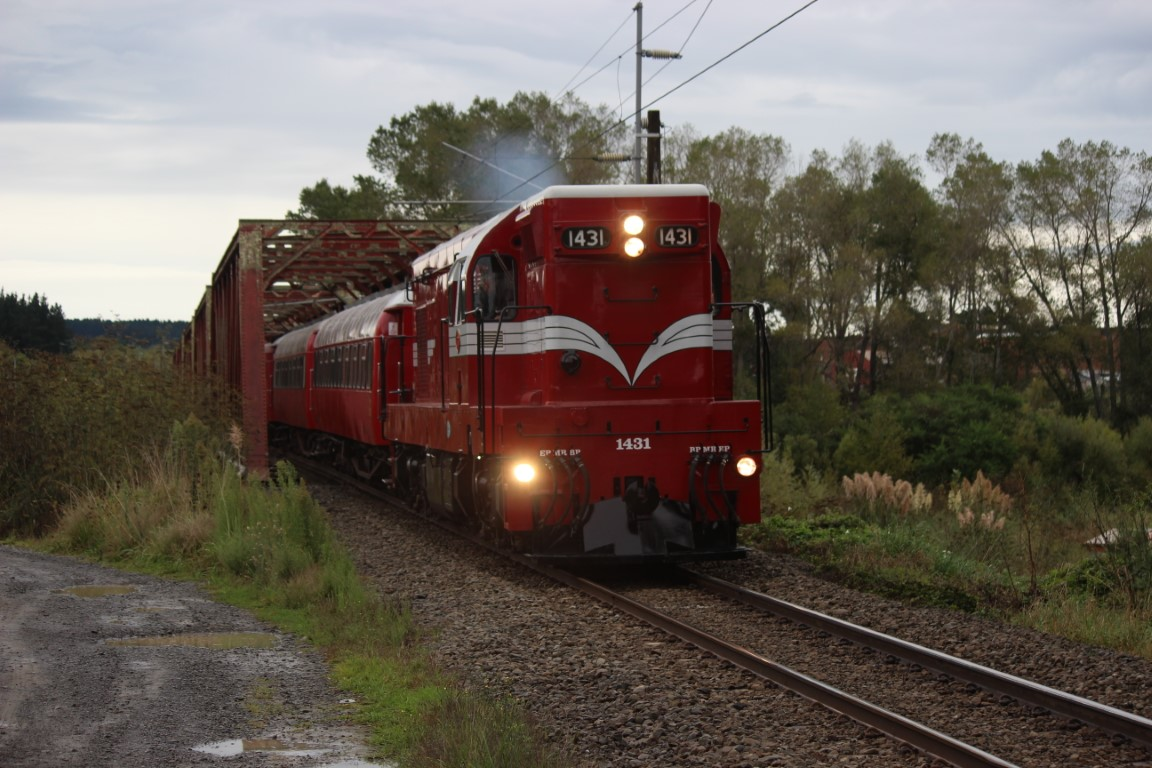
D^{A} 1431 crosses the Rangitikei River in 2017. This locomotive is one of several of the class preserved by Steam Incorporated.

Six D^{A} class locomotives have been preserved:

- D^{A} 1400/D^{AA} 1400: (TMS DA11) was donated to the Museum of Transport & Technology in Auckland in 1983 as the class leader of the D^{A} class. Statically restored for static display. It was moved from its display location at MOTAT 1 in Great North Road, to the museums Meola Road site and undercover for conservation on 26 September 2014.
- D^{A} 1401/D^{AA} 1401: (TMS DA28) was sold to Sims-PMI for scrap in 1986 but remained intact until purchased by Tony Bachelor in 1988 for his Pacific Rail Trust. Moved around Auckland, it was leased by the now-inactive PRT to Tranz Rail in 1997 although it only saw limited service and was quickly stored at Hutt Workshops. It was reactivated for Feilding and District Steam Rail Society by Toll Rail in 2005 and went on lease to them in 2007 before being donated by Bachelor to F&DSR in 2008.
- D^{A} 1410: (TMS DA126) was purchased from NZ Rail in 1988 by Steam Incorporated. Initially only requiring a repaint, it was overhauled in 1999 shortly before being sent on loan to the Railway Enthusiasts Society, who based it at the Glenbrook Vintage Railway. 1410 was on loan to the Glenbrook Vintage Railway, 1998. Returned to Steam Incorporated over the weekend of 6–7 June 2015 along with J 1234. 1410 is now registered to operate heritage passenger trains on the National Rail System.
- D^{A} 1429: (TMS DA322) was purchased in 1987 by Tony Bachelor direct from NZR service. It moved around Auckland until leased to Tranz Rail in 1997 and saw regular service until 2003 when it ended up in Otahuhu. In 2010, Bachelor sold the locomotive to Auckland enthusiast Dean McQuoid who had it moved to the Glenbrook Vintage Railway where it is now based and used occasionally. Its registration to operate on the National rail system has lapsed and the locomotive now requires major rebuild.
- D^{A} 1431: (TMS DA345) was purchased from NZR in 1989 by Steam Incorporated. It was also placed on loan to the Railway Enthusiasts Society in 1998. Stored at the Glenbrook Vintage Railway until 2008, it returned to Paekākāriki in 2008 for restoration with RES-owned guards' van F 345. The restored locomotive returned to service in 2009.
- D^{A} 1471: (TMS DA725) was retained by Palmerston North depot staff in 1988 as a heritage locomotive. In 2002 it was leased to Steam Incorporated but was called back from its restoration base at Masterton by Toll Rail in 2007. Stored at Hutt Workshops, the locomotive deteriorated until purchased by Steam Inc. for preservation in 2012. It is currently under restoration.

Only two of the locomotives, 1410 and 1431 are currently National Rail Network registered although there are plans for 1471 and 1401 to join the ranks in due course.
