= New Zealand FP class electric multiple unit =

Class of rail units in New Zealand

New Zealand FP/FT class Matangi
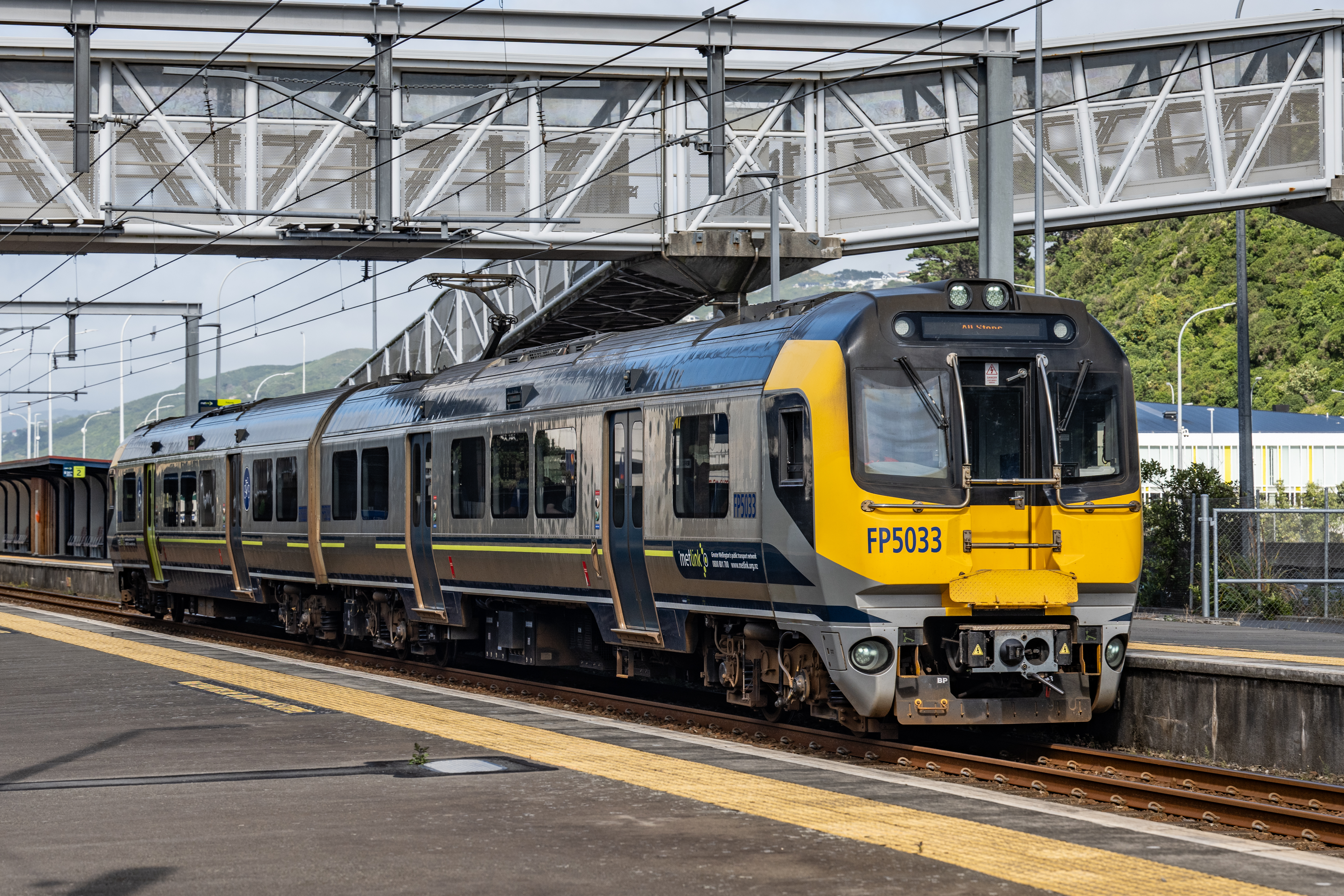
- FP5033 at Petone station

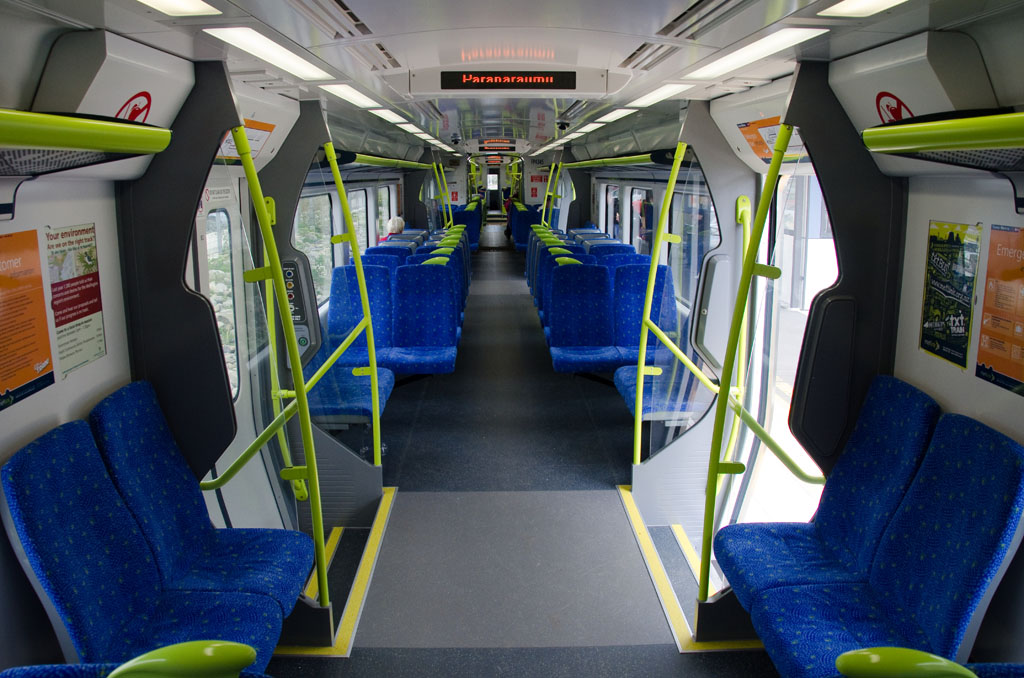
- Interior of an FP carriage of the Matangi EMU
- In service: 29 August 2010
- Manufacturers: Hyundai Rotem; Mitsui
- Built at: Changwon, South Korea
- Replaced: DM/D class; EM/ET class
- Constructed: 2008–2012, 2014–2016
- Entered service: 23 December 2010 – September 2016
- Number built: 83
- Number in service: 83
- Formation: 2 cars (FP–FT) per unit
- Fleet numbers: 4103–4610; 5010–5396
- Capacity: 147 seated, 230 standing (FP/FT unit)
- Operators: Tranz Metro (2010–2016); Transdev Wellington (2016–)
- Depot: Wellington
- Lines served: Wellington suburban lines: Kapiti Line; Hutt Valley Line; Melling Branch; Johnsonville Branch

Specifications
- Car body construction: Stainless steel
- Train length: 44.03 m (144 ft 5 in)
- Car length: 21.53 m (70 ft 8 in) (FP); 22.5 m (73 ft 10 in) (FT)
- Width: 2.73 m (8 ft 11 in)
- Height: 3.64 m (11 ft 11 in) without pantograph
- Floor height: 1,100 mm (3 ft 7 in) (high floor); 730 mm (2 ft 5 in) (FT low floor)
- Platform height: 730 mm (2 ft 5 in) nominal
- Entry: Level
- Doors: 8 × electronically operated twin doors (open on demand)
- Maximum speed: 120 km/h (75 mph) (design); 95 km/h (59 mph) (service)
- Weight: 76.9 t (75.7 long tons; 84.8 short tons) total
- Traction system: IGBT–VVVF
- Traction motors: 4 × 170 kW (230 hp) 3-phase AC
- Power output: 680 kW (910 hp)
- Acceleration: 0.84 m/s^{2} (2.8 ft/s^{2})
- Deceleration: 0.9 m/s^{2} (3.0 ft/s^{2}) (service); 1.2 m/s^{2} (3.9 ft/s^{2}) (emergency)
- Power supply: 2 × 50 kVA auxiliary power units, producing 230 V 50 Hz AC from traction supply
- HVAC: Heating and air conditioning
- Electric systems: 1,500 V DC (nominal) from overhead catenary
- Current collection: Pantograph
- UIC classification: Bo′Bo′+2′2′
- Braking systems: Rheostatic, electropneumatic and air
- Coupling system: Knuckle; Scharfenberg
- Multiple working: Within class only
- Track gauge: 1,067 mm (3 ft 6 in)

Notes/references
- Sourced from except where noted

The New Zealand FP/FT "Matangi" class (/ˈmɑːtʌŋi/) is a class of electric multiple units used on the suburban rail network of New Zealand's capital city, Wellington. The class, consisting of an FP power car and an FT trailer car, operates services on all electrified lines of the network which comprise the Kapiti, Hutt Valley, Melling and Johnsonville lines. The units are owned by Greater Wellington Rail Ltd, a subsidiary of the Greater Wellington Regional Council (GWRC), and have been operated by Transdev Wellington under contract to the GWRC since 2016. They were previously operated by Tranz Metro, a former division of KiwiRail.

The FP/FT units were built in South Korea by a consortium of Hyundai Rotem and Mitsui, with the first unit arriving in New Zealand on 31 July 2010 and entering full-time service in March 2011. The first batch of 48 units, the 4000 series units, allowed an increase in the capacity of the Wellington network, and allowed the retirement of the ageing DM/D class "English Electric" multiple units that were introduced between 1949 and 1954. The 4000 series also relegated the EM/ET "Ganz-Mavag" class multiple units (introduced 1982-83) to peak services only. A second batch of 35 units, the 5000 series, were introduced in 2015–16 to replace the remaining EM/ET units.

== History ==
In 2005 GWRC unveiled a plan for the upgrade of the Wellington commuter rail system to increase capacity and service frequencies. The plan also included:

- Extension of commuter services to Waikanae. This involved extending electrification from Paraparaumu and duplicating the line from Mackay's Crossing (north of Paekakariki) to just south of the Waikanae River. The line was renamed from the Paraparaumu Line to the Kapiti Line when services commenced from Waikanae on 20 February 2011.
- New station building and associated facilities at Waikanae, and the reconstruction of those at Paraparaumu.
- The lowering of Tunnels, extension of loops and renewal of track on the Johnsonville Line.
- Upgrade of facilities at several stations.
- Resurfacing and heightening of all the platforms on the Johnsonville Line and some on other lines.
- The acquisition of new EMU (electric multiple unit) rolling stock.

== Tender and supply ==
In December 2006, GWRC announced that it would begin the tendering process for 29 EMUs to replace the DM/D English Electric EMUs and to provide additional network capacity. GWRC formed a subsidiary named Greater Wellington Rail Limited to purchase the EMUs and three tenders were shortlisted; Construcciones y Auxiliar de Ferrocarriles (CAF), a consortium of Rotem & Mitsui and a consortium of EDi Rail & Bombardier transportation. In July 2007 GWRC announced that the preferred supplier was the consortium of Rotem and Mitsui with the units to be built at the Rotem works in Changwon, South Korea.

In April 2008, GWRC announced that an additional 10 units would be purchased, following an earlier addition of another 6 units to the original order. A further addition to the order of three units was announced by GWRC on 4 November 2008, bringing the total number of units to 48 (96 cars).

On 23 August 2012 the Greater Wellington Regional Council announced that the option of placing another order for a further 35 units was preferred over refurbishing the EM/ET units, as refurbishing the existing fleet of Ganz Mavag units would be costly and their life would only be extended by 15 years, and still suffer excessive breakdowns. The result of the change would be a totally uniform fleet. The first two of these units, FP/FT 5010 and 5027, landed at the Port of Auckland on 12 May 2015, off the vessel Thermopylae.

== Specifications ==
GWRC advised that the Request for Tender documentation included the following requirements, although some specifications may change and no weight specifications were available.

- The car body height shall not exceed 3506 mm above rail level (ARL) with the pantograph lowered.
- The external width shall not exceed 2730 mm.
- The maximum height of the floor shall not exceed 1106 mm ARL.
- The platform level floor height shall be nominally 680 mm ARL.
- The single-car length shall not exceed 20700 mm.
- Bogie centres shall be 15300 mm.

The cars have AC traction gear and convert the DC power supply to AC.

The interior configuration allows for more standing room, increasing the passenger capacity compared with the EM/ET class units. This does not come at the expense of seating capacity, which remains the same but with 42 fewer front/rear-facing seats per set – the A (western) side of the section between the doors of each FT car contains only longitudinal seats, to widen the aisle.

The preliminary design was modified with the addition of an emergency exit door at each end to allow for evacuation in the single-track tunnels on the Wellington network (seven on the Johnsonville Branch and five on the North–South Junction). The end doors also allows train staff to move between units while the train is moving or where no platform is available.

The FP/FT class differs from the EM/ET class in that the power car is the northern car of the pair rather than the southern one. This is due to only the FT car having a floor level with the platforms for wheelchair access (and a retractable ramp if needed) and having the FT at the southern end makes it closer to the concourse at Wellington railway station. For easy identification, the doors leading to the low floor area of the FT car are painted lime green, whereas the remainder are painted navy blue. Additional differences include a change to open-on-demand doors - rather than all the doors opening when the train stops at the station (as on the DM/D and EM/ET class), the doors are unlocked and passengers must press a button to open that set of doors. At terminal stations, the doors automatically close again after 90 seconds to keep the elements out of the train interior.

The FP/FT units have a door interlock system, which prevents the driver applying power while the train doors are still open and unlocked. On the EM/ET units, drivers had to double-check the "doors closed" light was on before applying power, potentially leading to human error. This configuration led to an incident in March 2013 when three EM/ET units left Wingate station with their doors open and no passenger staff on board, after the driver mistakenly thought he heard the "right-of-way" buzzer.

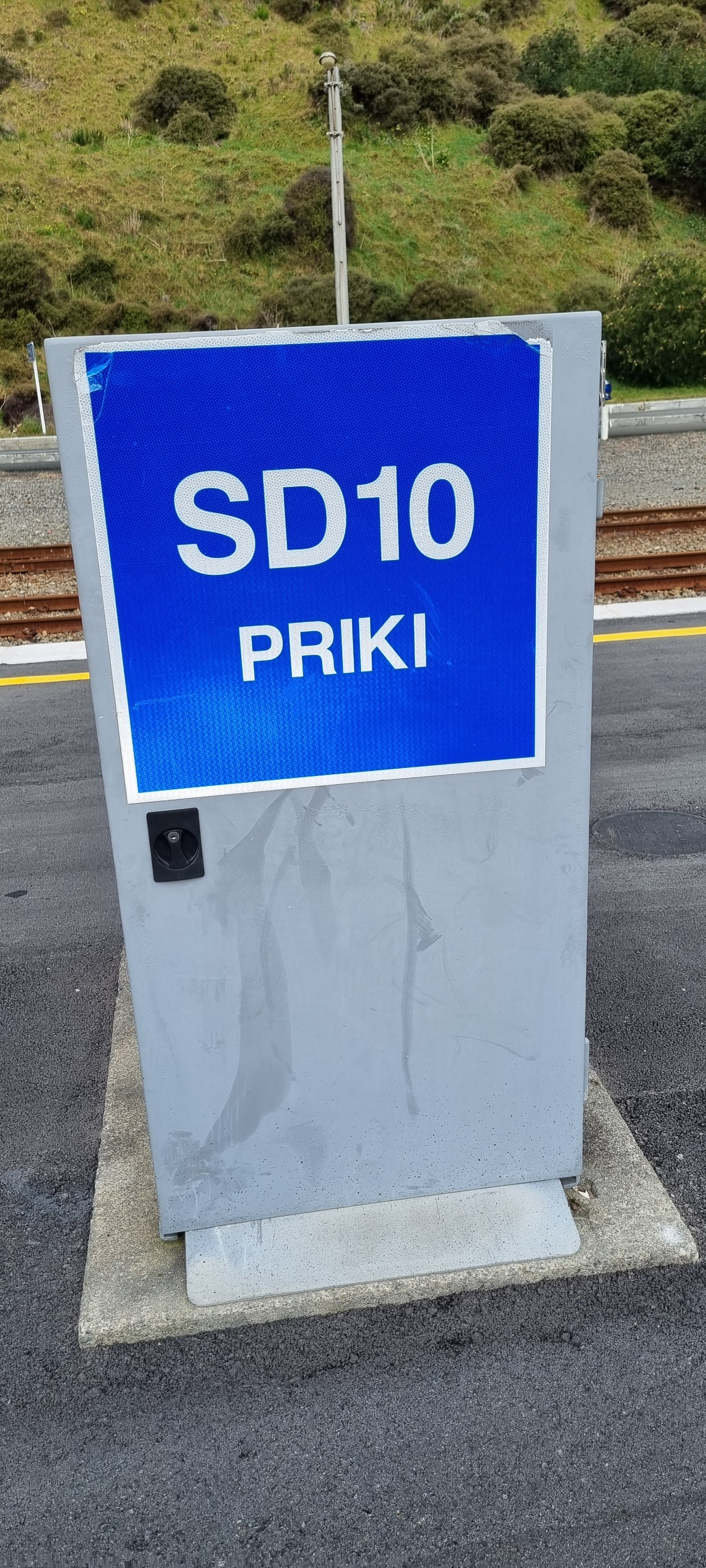
SD10 Cabinets are located at 38 location across the Wellington rail network. They contain an emergency coupling adapter to allow Matangi EMUs with a Scharfenberg coupler to be coupled to locomotives ond other rolling stock with a Knuckle coupler.

The 5000 series units have fully automatic Scharfenberg couplers as standard instead of the first batch's semi-automatic knuckle couplers (for emergency coupling to the EMs), and LED lamps for headlights and interior lighting instead of halogen bulbs and fluorescent tubes. Both changes were retrofitted to the 4000 series units.

With the withdrawal of the EM units on 27 May 2016, the operating voltage was increased to 1700V DC to increase the power output available. In 2020, power supply upgrades on the Kapiti Line ($10.1 million) will allow even longer (8 car) trains.

== Service ==
A large amount of preparation works were undertaken in the Wellington region to allow the units to operate: clearances in tunnels, at platforms and under some bridges had to be increased to take the new trains. KiwiRail installed eleven new rectifier substations to increase the electrical supply for the new trains (nine on existing electrified lines, and two on the new extension to Waikanae), and hardened the signalling system against interference from their AC traction equipment. The operating voltage was increased to 1600 volts DC to maximise the power available, with the overhead supply being 1700 volts DC. Despite the power upgrades the length of Matangi trains was initially limited to a maximum of six cars out of concern for the load long trains would have on the power supply. Testing performed by Tranz Metro and KiwiRail in September 2011 with eight-car sets in revenue service on the Hutt Valley and Kapiti Lines found that the network is able to cope with a limited number of long trains (one at a time on the Hutt Valley line and two on the Kapiti line) resulting in eight-car trains being permitted.

The first unit, 4103, operated preview services on 23 December 2010: the 9:05 am Hutt Valley service ex-Wellington and the return 10:00 am service from Upper Hutt. After these services it returned to testing duties, including four-car running with 4132.

It was intended for the units to be running in regular service on the Hutt Valley and Melling Lines from January 2011, followed by the Johnsonville Line by May 2011 and Kapiti Line from July 2011. but this has been delayed. Regular revenue service commenced on 25 March 2011 with unit 4103 running on the Hutt Valley Line, initially running two off-peak return services to Upper Hutt and a Melling Line service each weekday However a combination of slower-than-expected testing, certification and driver-training programmes saw this timetable slip, prompting criticism from commuters. Overcrowding on existing services saw temporary measures introduced in April 2011, with morning peak Melling line trains replaced by buses to free up units for the Kapiti and Hutt Valley Lines, and the minimum fare removed on Wellington-bound Wairarapa Connection services to allow Hutt Valley Line passengers to use the train without penalty (the latter change became permanent in October 2011).

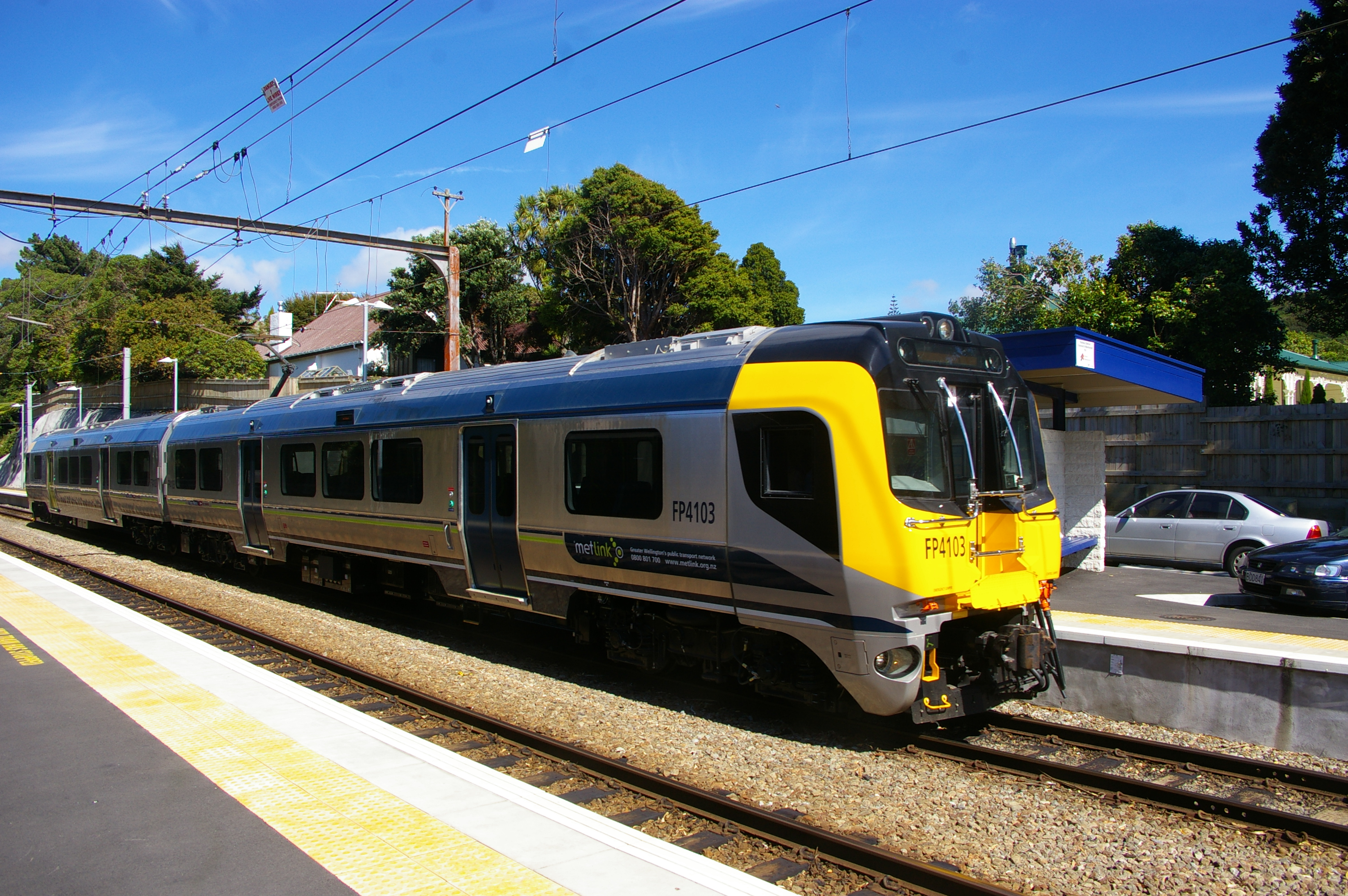
4103 at Khandallah station on the Johnsonville Line. The Matangi units were the first new rolling stock to serve the Johnsonville line in 74 years.

Other units were introduced to service as they arrived and completed testing and services checks and were cleared by the New Zealand Transport Agency. In June 2011, all seven units in service were temporarily withdrawn after problems was discovered in the auxiliary power units of two units. A faulty inductor coil in the APUs caused them to overheat, and the trains were fitted with extra cooling fans and settings for the APU power supply were altered so the trains could continue in service while replacement APUs were shipped out from Korea.

Introduction to the Kapiti Line was achieved in August 2011 when sufficient units became available. Another significant milestone was achieved in November 2011 when the units took over about 50% of the weekday off-peak services on these lines from the Ganz-Mavag units.

Services began on the Johnsonville Line on 19 March 2012, having been delayed by a combination of driver training needs, units being required on the other lines due to rolling stock shortages caused by reliability issues with some Ganz units, and the withdrawal of the EO/SE set from service – ironically the older DM/D class units used on the Johnsonville line had fewer issues - and operational clearance not being granted by NZTA. While all units are capable of operating on this line, a small number will initially be dedicated to operating the majority of services.

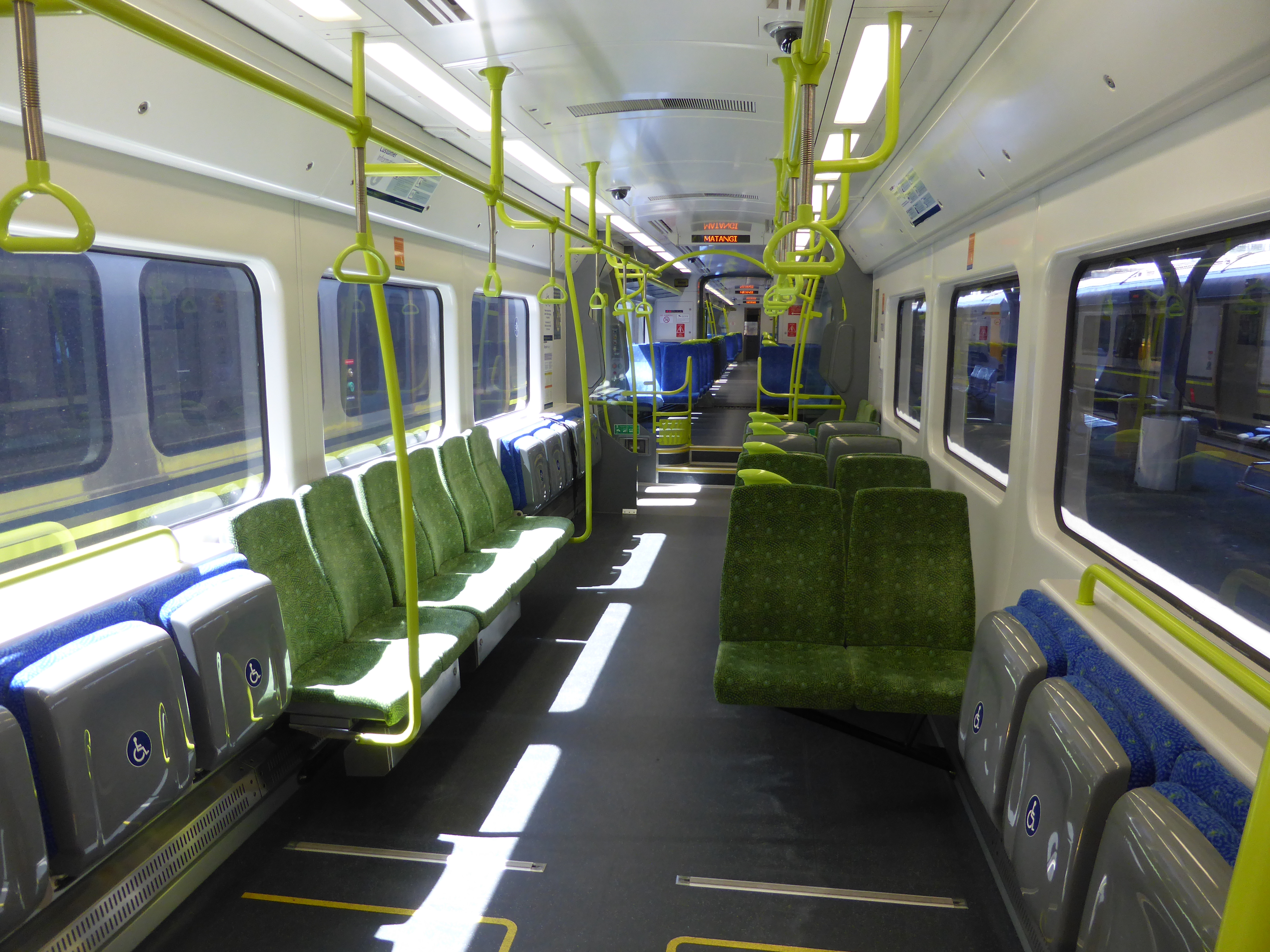
Trailer Carriage of The FP/FT Matangi Units

The lower-floor trailer unit has an area with folding seats for wheelchairs or prams, and for three bicycles during off-peak (and during peak if in the non-peak direction of travel). The entry to low floor area is marked by a lime green door, whereas all other doors are navy blue. In July 2012, a passenger with a bicycle was ordered off a peak-hour train at Petone, and after refusing to comply and holding up the train for 15 minutes, was subsequently removed by police.

=== Rail squeal ===
Not long after the units were introduced on the Johnsonville Line, residents along the line started complaining of the trains emitting a high-pitched squealing noise as they rounded some corners. Although squealing caused by wheel slip is not uncommon on rail systems worldwide, the gradient and curve radius on the Johnsonville Line exacerbated it. During the 2012-13 Christmas/New Year period, dispensers of friction modification fluid (oil) were fitted to the line to lubricate the rail and help reduce the noise. The fluid has produced mixed results, reducing the squeal in some places but making no difference on others, however has the unfortunate side-effect of reducing rail adhesion – when combined with a wet rail, it has caused trains to overshoot platforms and to lose traction, resulting in cancellations or delays. Wheel dampers are also to be trialled on two units to help reduce the squeal.

The 5000 series units, introduced from mid-2015, have sound dampeners in-built. A rubber ring is placed inside the wheel to reduce resonance as the wheel turns through a curve.

=== Parts supply ===
In 2025 a parts supplier for Matangi trains Trovon Australia which was owned by a Malaysian company went into administration and in January 2026 was liquidated in Australia. It supplied parts for HVAC a/c units, air compressors and brake units through a New Zealand branch in Upper Hutt. In January 2026 seven Matangis were waiting parts, and Hyundi Rotem and KiwiRail were expecting a further four units to be awaiting parts before more parts were available in August 2026. However this was not expected to result in a shortage of Matangis for existing services.

== Accidents ==
During their time in service, there have been several accidents involving Matangi units. Two of the accidents involved trains overrunning Melling station.

- On the morning of 15 April 2013, unit 4149 overran the Melling station and hit the stop block. Several passengers on board suffered minor injuries, while the unit suffered minor frontal damage. The KiwiRail investigation determined that driver error was the cause.
- On the morning of 27 May 2014, unit 4472 overran the Melling station and took out the stop block and the overhead line pole behind it. Passengers reported the driver leaving the cab telling them the brakes had failed and they should brace for impact shortly before the crash. Two passengers were taken to hospital for minor injuries and shock.
- On the morning of 4 July 2018, a Matangi train hit a person as they were trying to cross the tracks near Linden station in Tawa. Witnesses say the person had headphones in and did not hear the train coming. The person died at the scene.
- On the morning of 17 August 2021 a landslip blocked the Kapiti Line one kilometre south of the Fisherman’s Table restaurant at the north end of the single-line section, and derailed a Matangi train. The section had one slip alarm, but not on the section where the slip occurred. The Matangi EMUs are expected to take months to repair, at a cost of up to half a million dollars.
- On the evening of 6 June 2026 unit 5275 crashed between Khandallah and Box Hill stations when it ran a red light and was diverted to a runoff line south of Khandallah Station. The unit was damaged in the accident and eight people were injured.

== Livery ==
The class usually wears an unpainted stainless steel finish, offset by the Metlink branding colours of dark blue and lime green, with yellow safety ends. One unit, FT/FP 5350, was wrapped with advertisements in October 2024 to promote the grocery delivery service Delivereasy.

== Naming and classification ==
The name Matangi, Māori for wind, (Note: Matangi is one of several Māori words for wind or breeze; the most prevalent other word is hau, as in Hauraki Gulf (north wind).) came from a competition run by GWRC. Over 100 entries were received, including several Thomas the Tank Engine-inspired suggestions. It was nominated by Linden commuter Brian Bond, chosen for Wellington's windy reputation and the new trains being "as fast as the wind" and a "breath of fresh air to the transport system". The name was also chosen as it is easy to pronounce and spell, is distinctively Kiwi, and had support from local iwi (Māori tribes). From their introduction until 2014, the units displayed "Matangi" on their destination signs when a destination was not selected; in 2014, this was changed to display "metlink.org.nz" (the GWRC's public transport website) instead.

The class letters have been chosen as a continuation of the class letters assigned to the DM/D English Electric and EM/ET Ganz Mavag EMUs. FP stands for Matangi Power car (FM was not chosen to avoid confusion with NZR FM guards vans from the 1980s, some of which are preserved) and FT for Matangi Trailer car. The first batch of units are numbered in the 4000 series: FP 4103 to FP 4610 and FT 4103 to FT 4610, with each FP operating with their corresponding numbered FT. The second batch of units are numbered in the 5000 series.

The numbering uses the TMS numbering pattern, in which the first three digits are the EMUs number, and the last digit is a check digit.
