= KPI =

KPI may refer to:

== Companies and organizations ==
- Indonesian Broadcasting Commission (Komisi Penyiaran Indonesia)
  - Indonesian Broadcasting Commission Awards (Anugerah KPI)
- Kralyevich Productions, an American video production company
- Kuwait Petroleum International

=== Institutes ===
- Kansas Policy Institute, a think tank in Wichita, U.S.
- Kharkiv Polytechnic Institute (abbr. KhPI), Ukraine
- Khulna Polytechnic Institute, Bangladesh
- Kyiv Polytechnic Institute, Ukraine
- Kryvyi Rih State Pedagogical University, former name of Kryvyi Rih State Pedagogical University

== Other uses ==
- Kapit Airport, IATA airport code "KPI"
- Key performance indicator
- Kingpin inclination
- Shortening of Kuda Pacu Indonesia, a type of horse breed originating in Indonesia
