= Kāpiti Line =

Wellington commuter rail line

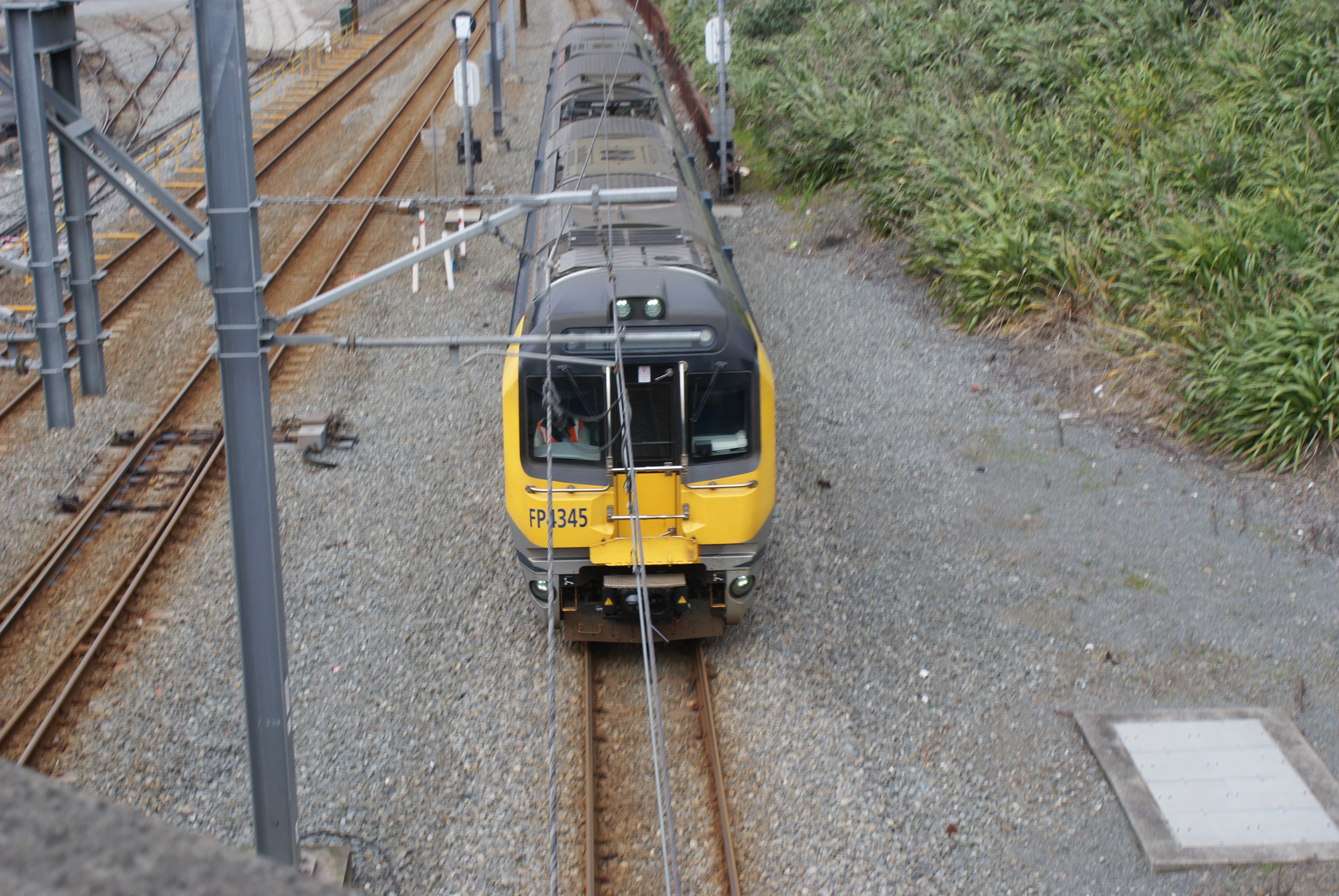
- A northbound train servicing the Kāpiti Line after departing from Wellington railway station

Overview
- Status: Open
- Owner: KiwiRail (track); Greater Wellington Regional Council (stations)
- Locale: Wellington region, New Zealand
- Termini: Wellington; Waikanae
- Stations: 16

Service
- Type: Commuter rail
- System: Metlink
- Route number: KPL
- Operator: Transdev Wellington
- Rolling stock: FP/FT class "Matangi" EMUs
- Ridership: 4,461,000 per annum (2011–12)

Technical
- Character: Suburban
- Track gauge: 1,067 mm (3 ft 6 in)
- Electrification: 1,500 V DC overhead catenary

Metlink's Kāpiti Line is the electrified southern portion of the North Island Main Trunk railway between New Zealand's capital city, Wellington, and Waikanae on the Kāpiti Coast, operated by Transdev Wellington on behalf of Greater Wellington Regional Council. Trains run frequently every day, with stops at 16 stations. Until 20 February 2011 it was known as the Paraparaumu Line.

== History ==
The Kāpiti Line was constructed by the Wellington and Manawatu Railway Company (WMR) as part of its line between Wellington and Longburn, south of Palmerston North. Construction of the line began in September 1882 and followed a circuitous, steep route via Johnsonville. It was opened to Plimmerton in October 1885 and completed on 3 November 1886. The final spike was driven just north of Paraparaumu, at Otaihanga. The government acquired the WMR company on the 7 December 1908 and incorporated it into its national network as the southern portion of the North Island Main Trunk line.

== Operation ==
From electrification in 1940 services were mainly hauled by ED electric locos until new multiple units arrived in 1949. From then until the 1980s, the majority of commuter services on the line were operated by DM/D electric multiple units, with some carriage trains hauled by ED and EW electric locomotives, particularly at peak periods. ED and EW locomotives also hauled freight trains over this section until the floors of the tunnels between Pukerua Bay and Paekakariki were lowered in 1967 and DA diesel locomotives could be used into Wellington.

In 1948, the traffic over the 24 mile (38.5 km) Wellington to Paekakariki section averaged 30 passenger trains, 18 goods trains and 13 light engines (ED class) daily, with 67 daily crossings; opinion was that train delays were less frequent and of shorter duration with CTC than with Tyers Tablet control in 1937. The average tons per train was 474 tons per train northward and 473 southward, with passenger trains just over 560 tons in aggregate.

From 1982, the new EM/ET electric multiple units were delivered. They had been ordered to replace the wooden carriage trains hauled by electric locomotives on commuter services and largely displaced the DM/D units on the Paraparaumu Line.

By the 1980s, the ED and EW electric locomotives were not required for either freight trains or for commuter trains. They were retired due to age and lack of use, the EDs by 1981 and the EWs by 1988. From 2010 the introduction of the Matangi EMUs provided extra passenger capacity, and enabled the remaining DM/D EMUs to be withdrawn in 2012. A second batch of Matangi EMUs was then ordered to replace the EM/ET EMUs (rather than reconditioning them).

A proposal to extend the electrification to Waikanae was approved by the Greater Wellington Regional Council on 8 May 2007. This project included the double tracking of the single track line between Mackays Crossing (between Paekakariki and Paraparaumu) as far as the rail underbridge and river bridge south of Waikanae. The $90 million project started in December 2008, and was completed in 2011, with the first commuter trains to Waikanae on 20 February. Completion of the project was delayed to 2011 to minimise commuter disruption by working in the quiet end-of-year holiday period, according to ONTRACK programme director David Gordon. The project involved 50 workers and 20 machines installing 600 traction poles in eight or nine metre deep holes, and laying 30 km of rail and 30,000 sleepers. The project allows commuter services from Waikanae every 15 minutes at peak travel times but more commonly every 30 minutes. The new Matangi electric multiple units were used on the Kapiti Line from mid-2011. Paraparaumu and Waikanae stations were upgraded at a cost of more than $1 million each. Upgrading Waikanae station rather than moving it south of Elizabeth Street or providing a road underpass was criticised locally, as frequent closing of the Elizabeth Street level crossing south of the station (which connected to State Highway through the town) could increase traffic congestion in Waikanae. However this has since been alleviated by the opening of the Kāpiti Expressway which has moved the main road west and out of the centre of Waikanae.

Ten traction substations along the line take electricity from Wellington Electricity or Electra's 11,000-volt distribution network and transform and rectify it to 1500-volt direct current for the overhead traction lines. The substations are located at Wellington, Kaiwharawhara, Glenside, Paremata, Mana, Pukerua Bay, Paekakariki, Raumati, Lindale and Waikanae. Also along the line are two "cross-tie" substations at Ngauranga and Tawa, which provide a switching function but do not have transformers or rectifiers.

Public road-rail crossings have warning lights and barriers, and some are now fitted with automatically locking pedestrian gates to prevent use while alarms are operating.

Between 2021 and March 2024, upgrades were made to Plimmerton railway station that allowed some trains to turn around at Plimmerton rather than the earlier Porirua, increasing the peak capacity of the line by reducing the number of passengers on trains to Waikanae.

In July 2026 thefts of copper cable at the Takapu Road Station disrupted rail services on the line. Similar thefts also occurred this year on the Hutt Valley Line.

== Future ==
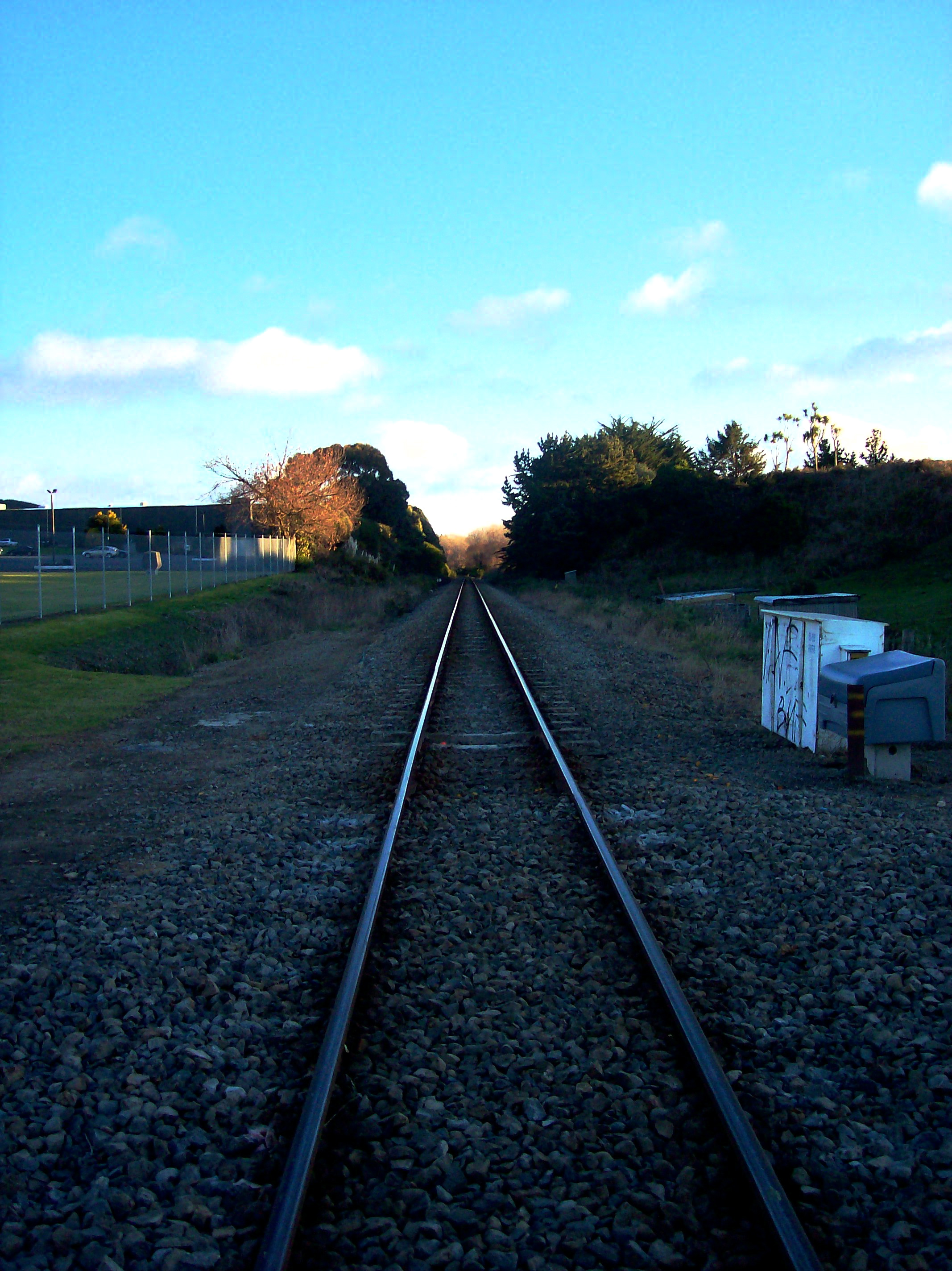
The Kapiti Line (2007, before electrification), looking south from the Otaihanga Road level crossing. On the right is the location of a former halt; on the left is the Southward Car Museum.

The development of new stations at Raumati South, between Mackays Crossing and Paraparaumu, and Lindale, north of Paraparaumu near Otaihanga, has been proposed in the past as areas for future development on the line. This was paused in 2010 due to issues with the proposed sites, and indefinitely shelved following the 2013 review of the Wellington Regional Public Transport Plan. This review confirmed that building additional stations on the Kāpiti Line at Raumati and Lindale were no longer recommended, with the cost of new stations outweighing the benefits. The detailed analysis for Raumati (which was a "viability benchmark" for other new stations) said that the modelled peak-hour patronage needed to be about 300 new passengers to justify a new station, and that most Raumati users would have switched from Paraparaumu Station. Network extensions beyond the current Metlink rail operation limits would be by "shuttles or non-electrified services" running to Wellington.

Proposed infrastructure upgrades include sleeper replacement in tunnels, stabilisation of high-risk slopes and renewal of one bridge with timber elements. To cater for freight trains with more frequent passenger trains, there will be a new freight loop at Plimmerton or an improved loop at Porirua (2021/2022; $11.09 million); and Plimmerton will get a high capacity train turn-back facility as a terminal station (2021; $12.8 million). Power supply upgrades will allow more long (8 car) trains (2020; $10.1 million).

The single-track section above the coast between Pukerua Bay and Paekākāriki (known as the North–South Junction) may also be double tracked through a single long double track tunnel (replacing five short tunnels) or replaced by a less steep deviation; although the proposal in 2007 was to daylight only the northernmost (No. 7) tunnel which is through rock, and have double track north from there.

=== Extension to Ōtaki ===
Further extension of the electrification 15 kilometres (9.3 mi) north from Waikanae to Ōtaki remains a possibility. The two over bridges of the Peka Peka to Otaki expressway which opened in 2022 were designed to allow for a future double track line. A group known as "Save Kapiti" is actively campaigning for the extension as of 2011. The Otaki Community Board also supports the extension of electrification. Provision has been made during road earthworks north of Waikanae for a future crossing loop between Peka Peka and Ōtaki. In 2012 the Greater Wellington Regional Council investigated extension of the electrification with Matangi trains north of Waikanae to Ōtaki (estimated cost $30 million for the Ōtaki project) and north of Upper Hutt to a new station at Timberlea.

In March 2014, the GWRC said that electrification to Ōtaki was estimated to cost $115 million to $135 million and was too costly for the number of new passengers it would attract (approximately 250 new passengers). Because the trip would take over an hour, new trains with toilets would be required. As an alternative to electrification, it was suggested that diesel multiple units could be used on services north of Waikanae. This could be a "final nail in the coffin" for the under-threat Capital Connection service from Wellington to Palmerston North, which also stops at Ōtaki. During the 2017 general election, the Green Party proposed extending electrification to Ōtaki as an alternative to the Northern Corridor extension from Peka Peka.

In the lead up to the local authority elections of 2019, candidate for Mayor of the Kāpiti Coast District, Gwynn Compton, started a petition to extend electrification to Ōtaki.

During the 2020 general election the National Party announced that National would extend the electric commuter rail service to Ōtaki and fast-track a four-lane expressway from Ōtaki to Levin.

A business case for extending the line further to Levin has been pushed for by transport minister Michael Wood in 2022, adding an extra 35 km to the line, going past Ōtaki and possibly including Te Horo and Manakau.

== See also ==
- Capital Connection
- List of Wellington railway stations
- North–South Junction (from Pukerua Bay to Paekakariki)
