= Belmont Viaduct, Wellington =

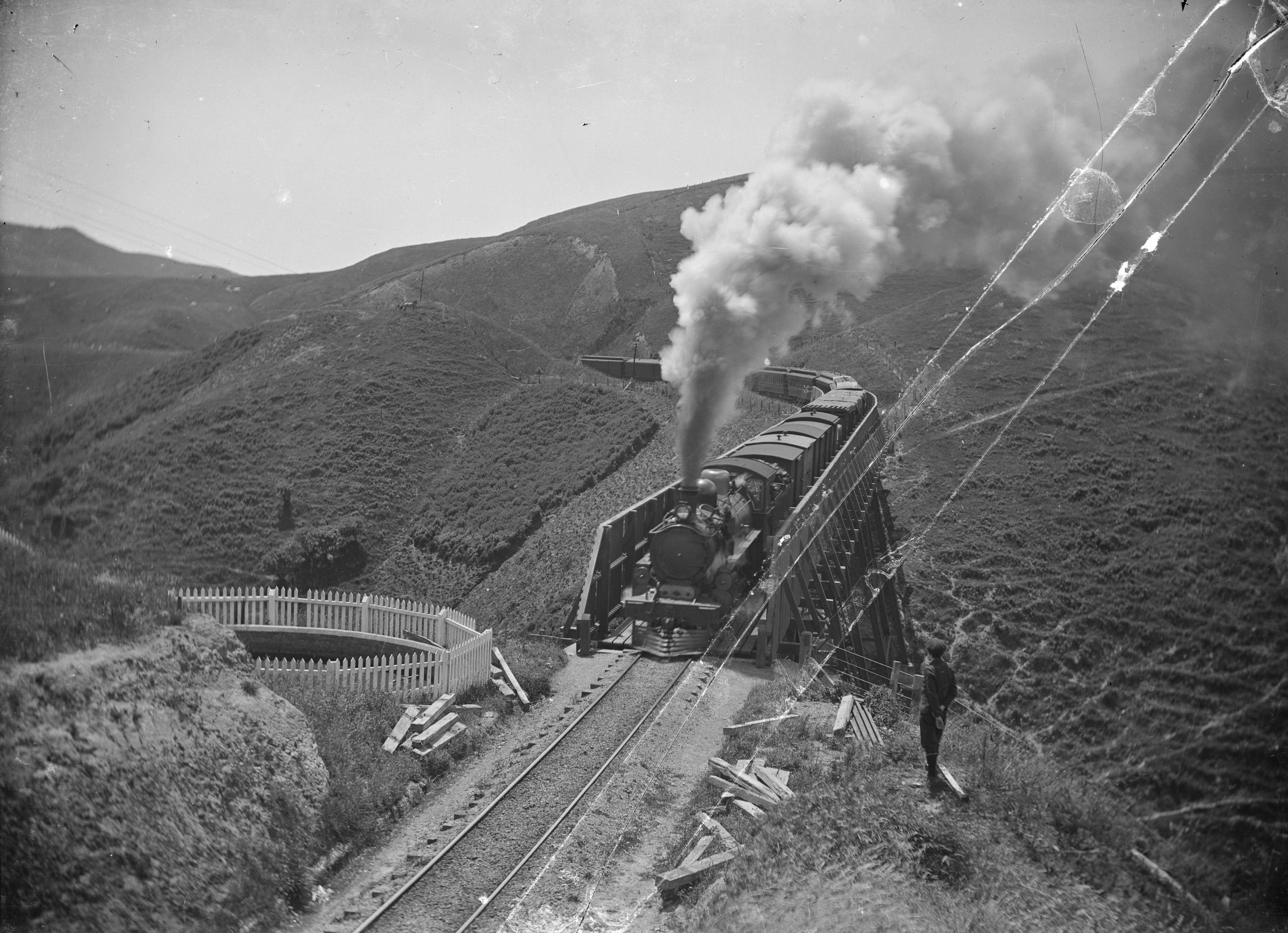
- Coordinates: 41°12′40.1″S 174°49′03.0″E
- Carries: Ex-Wellington–Manawatu Line, Ex-North Island Main Trunk
- Crosses: Belmont Gully (Now Seton Nossiter Park)
- Locale: Paparangi, Wellington, New Zealand
- Owner: Wellington and Manawatu Railway Company, later New Zealand Railways Department

Characteristics
- Design: Trestle, Viaduct
- Material: Kauri wood trestles and cross-spars, later replaced with steel beams
- Total length: 102 m (341 ft)
- Width: Single Narrow Gauge Rail
- Height: 38 m (125 ft)

History
- Designer: Harry Higginson
- Constructed by: Morton Danaker
- Opened: 1885
- Rebuilt: 1903
- Closed: 1951

The Belmont Viaduct was a railway viaduct in Paparangi, New Zealand. The viaduct was originally built by the Wellington and Manawatu Railway Company as part of the Wellington-Manawatu line. When opened in 1885, with its original kauri wood structure, it was the largest of its kind in New Zealand. At the time it was reputed to be the largest wooden viaduct in the world, however this claim was largely disputed.

The viaduct played a role in the development of early infrastructure in Wellington, as it opened up the northern boundaries of the city, as well as providing access to the wider hinterlands of Horowhenua and Manawatu.

== Location ==
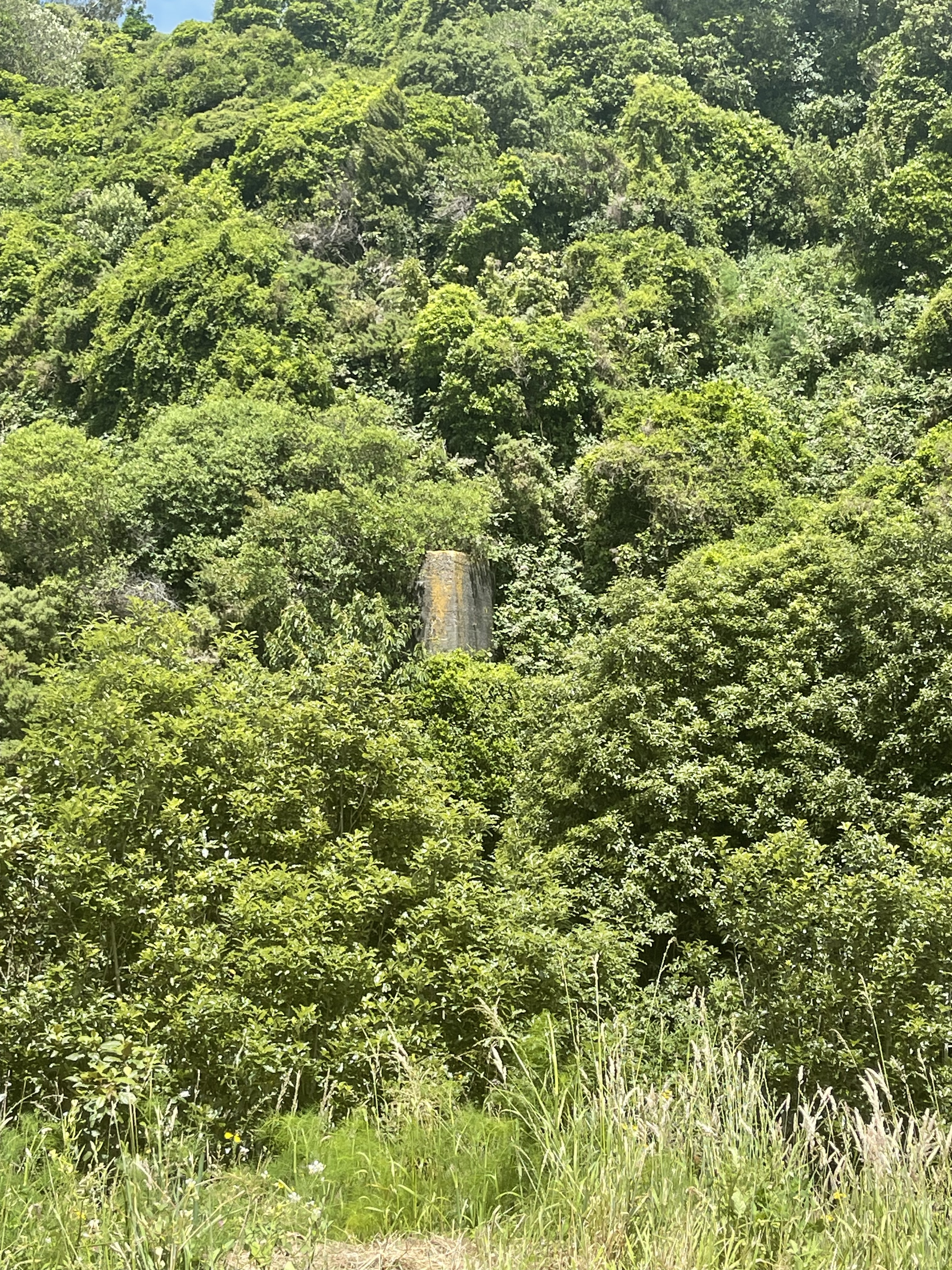
Abutment from the Belmont Railway Viaduct in Seton Nossiter Park

The Belmont Viaduct formed part of the Wellington-Manawatu Line between Johnsonville and Tawa. The viaduct spanned over Belmont Gully, now the location of Seton Nossiter Park.

The landscape present at the time of the viaduct differs significantly today, due to the construction of the Johnsonville–Porirua Motorway in the 1950s, the construction of the Mark Avenue road embankment, and the levelling of the surrounding hills for housing, creating the suburbs of Paparangi and Grenada Village. However, several remnants of the viaduct are visible at the bottom of Belmont Gully, visible from the Seton Nossiter walking track, in the form of several concrete foundations.

== History ==
=== Design and construction ===
The building was designed by the British civil engineer Harry Higginson, based on experience constructing railway lines in British India. He appointed as assistants Arthur Fulton and James Fulton, brothers from Dunedin. Construction of the viaduct was then appointed to Morton Danaker.

The viaduct was built in prefabricated sections on the ground with each structure being lifted section by section using a block and tackle arrangement. The seasoned kauri timber used was milled in areas around the country, then brought by sea to Porirua. They were then transported to the construction site via teams of bullock carts.

The viaduct completed in November 1886. Standing at 38 m high and 104 m long, this was the largest wooden trestle bridge in New Zealand.

=== Steel bridge replacement ===
In the early 1900s, the Wellington and Manawatu Railway Company opted to reconstruct many of its wooden bridges and viaducts. While the original wooden trestle structure was still suitable for use, the company decided to proceed with the replacement due to the threat of fire.

A new steel viaduct was prefabricated in the United States by the American Bridge Company, and shipped to Wellington for installation in 1903. The structure was built around the original wooden structure, inside the four existing pairs of timber trestles. When this was completed, the plate-girder sections to carry the track were rolled out and dropped into place between the piers. This resulted in construction being able to proceed, without delaying rail traffic. A travelling gantry arrangement was erected over the track so trains could continue to pass underneath.

=== Nationalisation of the Wellington and Manawatu Railway Company ===
In 1908, the Wellington-Manawatu line was purchased and nationalised by the New Zealand Government and incorporated into the North Island Main Trunk by the New Zealand Railways Department.

=== Tawa Flat Deviation and abandonment ===
By 1937, the line between Johnsonville and Tawa was rapidly reaching its operating limits due to its steep and winding layout. The line was replaced with the new 8.38 mile (13.49 km) double tracked Tawa Flat Deviation tunnel. The tunnel bypassed the viaduct completely, tunneling underground between Ngauranga and Tawa. With the opening of the new tunnel, the original WMR line was terminated at Johnsonville, with the viaduct being abandoned after 52 years of operation.

=== Demolition ===
In 1951, with concerns about public safety, it was decided to demolish the derelict viaduct. An arrangement was made with Army Territorial Engineers to deconstruct the bridge was part of a training exercise. The viaduct was blown up on 15 December 1951 using 97 lbs (44 kg) of TNT, after standing in place for 66 years.

== Specifications ==
The original viaduct stood 125 feet above the gully floor, with a length of 341 feet. The main uprights of the trestles and cross-spars were 14 inches by 14 inches of solid kauri, each 40-foot long. A total of 212,000 feet of seasoned kauri timber was used.

A total of 35 tons of wrought iron bolts, nuts, washers and fastening braces were used. The uprights stood on 14 concrete foundations in the gully with piers sunk 20 feet into the bed of the stream.

== See also ==
- Wellington and Manawatu Railway Company
- Harry Higginson
- Arthur Fulton
- James Edward Fulton
- Wellington-Manawatu Line
- North Island Main Trunk
- Johnsonville, New Zealand
- Paparangi, New Zealand
