= NZR WH class =

NZR W^{H} class
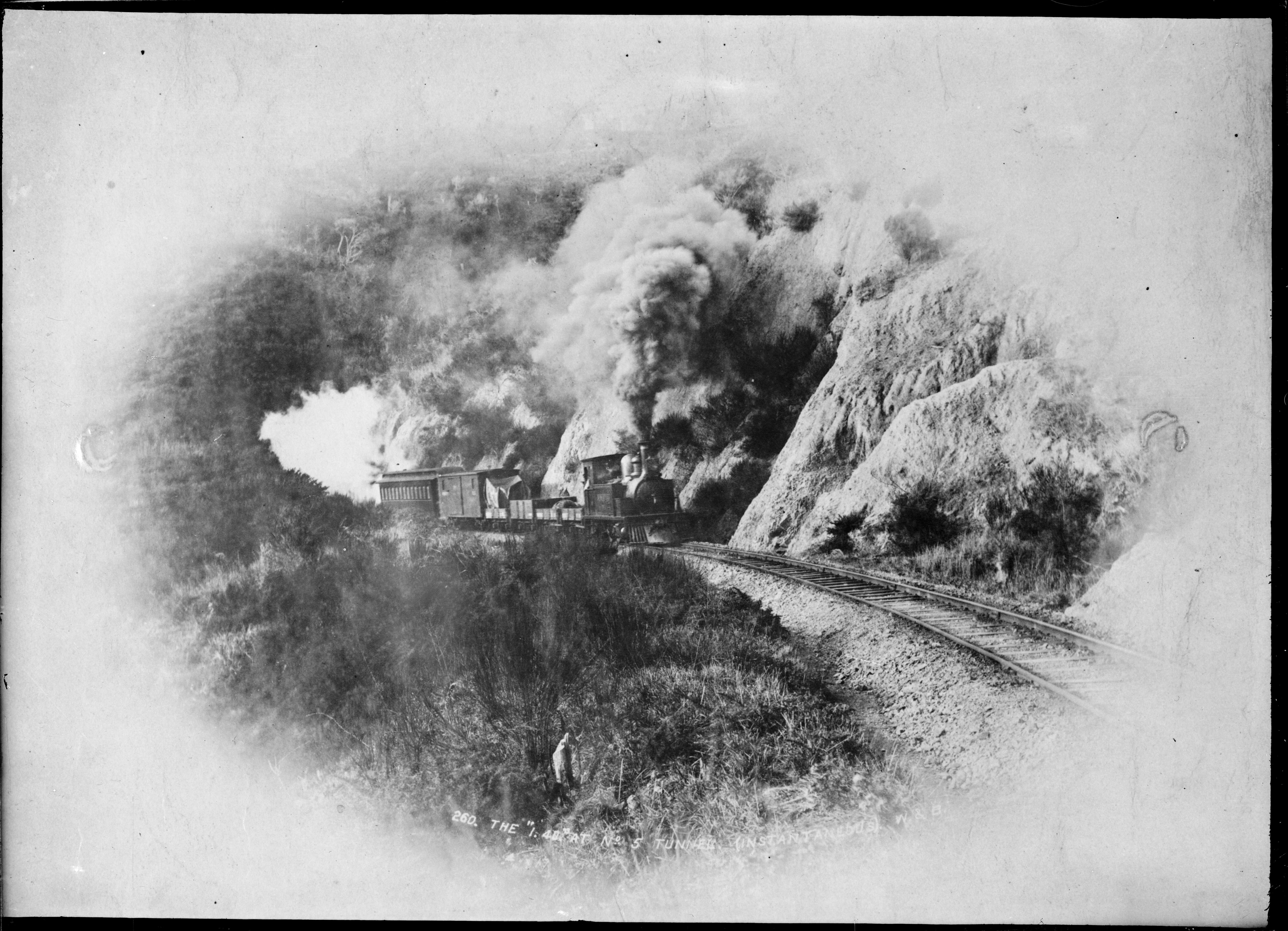
- Wellington and Manawatu Railway Company W^{H} class locomotive leaving Wadestown tunnel
Type and origin
- Power type: Steam
- Builder: Manning Wardle, Leeds, England
- Serial number: 920 to 924
- Build date: 1884
- Total produced: 5
Specifications
- Configuration
  - Whyte: 2-6-2T
- Gauge: 3 ft 6 in (1,067 mm)
- Wheel diameter: 37 in (940 mm)
- Adhesive weight: 23.9 long tons (24.3 t; 26.8 short tons)
- Loco weight: 32.9 long tons (33.4 t; 36.8 short tons)
- Fuel type: Coal
- Firebox
  - Grate area: 12 sq ft (1.1 m^{2})
- Boiler pressure: 140 psi (965 kPa)
- Heating surface: 687 sq ft (63.8 m^{2})
- Cylinders: 2
- Cylinder size: 12 in × 18 in (305 mm × 457 mm)
Performance figures
- Tractive effort: 7,850 lbf (34.9 kN)
Career
- Operators: Wellington and Manawatu Railway, New Zealand Government Railways
- Locale: Wellington - Manawatu Line
- Disposition: Withdrawn

The NZR W^{H} class was a class of three steam locomotives built by Manning Wardle in 1884 for service on New Zealand's private Wellington and Manawatu Railway Company (WMR). They did not acquire their W^{H} classification until 1908 when WMR was nationalised and incorporated into the New Zealand Government Railways (NZR). A total of five locomotives were purchased by the WMR but two had been sold by the time NZR took over the company.

== Introduction ==
The first locomotives purchased by the WMR were five 2-6-2T light tank locomotives, to be used for construction work and then for local traffic. The WMR engineer in charge of construction Harry Higginson sent his requirements to the WMR’s agent in London Sir Julius Vogel in 1883. Mr Bromley drew up detailed drawings and specifications, and a tender was awarded in January 1884 to Manning Wardle of Leeds, England. The first locomotive was tested at Leeds by Mr Bromley, who was killed in a railway accident at Bulhouse while returning to London.

== Service ==
No. 1 & 2 arrived at Wellington on the SS Aorangi on 15 September, and Nos. 4 & 5 on the SS Ionic arrived on 28 January 1885. No. 1 was tested at the Petone NZR workshops, and found to have tight bearings, with Higginson rebutting rumours printed in the Evening Post that it was of unsatisfactory design and manufacture. At least one locomotive arrived fitted with Howell’s copper coated steel tubes which were a failure and had to be replaced with copper tubes (according to WMR annual reports).

Their centre drivers were flangeless; and the smokeboxes were too short (possibly because of the coal used) so were extended within a couple of years. The extension improved their performance, if not their appearance. The first engine was eagerly awaited in September 1884, as the formation to Johnsonville was ready for tracklaying and ballasting, but the WMR had unsuccessfully tried to hire a locomotive from the Government in August 1884. The last two were shipped to Wanganui after erection at Wellington to provide much-needed motive power at the isolated Longburn end.

These engines were expected to haul 70 tons up the 1 in 40 grade to Johnsonville; and two in tandem could be used to Johnsonville, with only one proceeding to Paekakariki. For the easier run to Longburn a faster tender locomotive was required, and three engines similar to the NZR V class were ordered in 1883. The tank engines were averaging about 24,000 miles each in 1887-88 but about 17,000 miles each in 1889. By 1892, half of the running of Nos. 2, 3 & 5 was for track maintenance work (some 25,000 miles) and half for shunting and Wellington-Paekakariki banking. No. 5 required repairs in 1887-88 and 1892.

== Disposals ==
Two locomotives, WMR Nos. 3 and 5 (Manning Wardle Nos. 922 and 924), were sold to the Timaru Harbour Board in 1901. No. 5 was sold for £1000, and arrived in Timaru on 26 February 1901. No. 3 was reassembled at Addington, and reached Timaru on 22 April 1901. They were written off by WMR at the end of the 1900-01 financial year (No. 5) and in the 1901-02 financial year (No. 3). The mileage to 29/2/1908 (but presumably only for WMR service) is given as 219,999 miles (No. 3) and 211,602 miles (No. 5). Later, one was sold to the Mount Somers Tramway in the 1930s, and the other scrapped.

== Later service ==
Three remaining locomotives, WMR Nos. 1, 2 and 4 (Manning Wardle Nos. 920, 921, and 923) were taken over by the NZR in 1908, and classified as the W^{H} class. The NZR numbers were Nos. 447 (305,825 miles), 448 (319,724 miles), and 449 (346,162 miles) respectively; with the WMR mileage to 29 February 1908 given in brackets.
