= NZR N class =

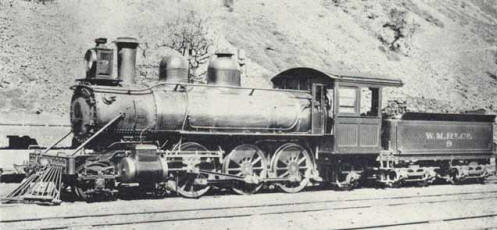
- NZR N class in service for the Wellington and Manawatu Railway Company as number 9, c. 1900.
Type and origin
- Power type: Steam
- Builder: Baldwin Locomotive Works
- Build date: 1885, 1891, 1901
Specifications
- Configuration
  - Whyte: 2-6-2
- Gauge: 3 ft 6 in (1,067 mm)
- Driver dia.: 49.125 in (1.248 m)
- Length: 50 ft 2 in (15.29 m) (1891 batch)
- Adhesive weight: 21 long tons (21 t; 24 short tons)
- Loco weight: 31.8 long tons (32.3 t; 35.6 short tons)
- Tender weight: 19.0 long tons (19.3 t; 21.3 short tons)
- Total weight: 50.7 long tons (51.5 t; 56.8 short tons) (1891 batch)
- Fuel type: Coal
- Fuel capacity: 7.5 long tons (7.6 t; 8.4 short tons)
- Water cap.: 5,000 imp gal (23,000 L; 6,000 US gal)
- Firebox
  - Grate area: 16 sq ft (1.5 m^{2})
- Boiler pressure: 135 psi (931 kPa) (1891 batch)
- Heating surface: 853 sq ft (79.2 m^{2})
- Cylinder size: 15 in × 20 in (381 mm × 508 mm)
Performance figures
- Maximum speed: 103.6 km/h (64.4 mph)
- Tractive effort: 9,890 lbf (43.99 kN)
Career
- Operators: Wellington and Manawatu Railway (2), New Zealand Government Railways (10)
- Number in class: 12
- Numbers: 27, 30, 34, 36, 37, 42, 351-354, 453 (ex WMR No. 9), 454 (ex WMR No. 10)
- Locale: Auckland, Hawke's Bay, Wellington (both NZR and WMR lines), Wairarapa, West Coast
- Retired: November 1926 - March 1934
- Current owner: Wellington and Manawatu Railway Trust
- Disposition: One preserved, remainder scrapped

The N class were 12 steam locomotives that operated on the national rail network of New Zealand. They were built in three batches, including one batch of two engines for the private Wellington and Manawatu Railway Company, the WMR, by the Baldwin Locomotive Works in 1885, 1891, and 1901. Previously the N class designation had been applied between 1877 and 1879 to Lady Mordaunt, a member of the B class of 1874.

== Construction ==
Despite the Long Depression of the 1880s, the young New Zealand railway network continued to expand, and additional motive power was required. The New Zealand Railways Department had normally ordered locomotives from England up until this time, though it had previously bought locomotives from United States manufacturers (such as the Rogers K class), and in 1885 it placed an order with Baldwin, whose first New Zealand locomotives were the T class, to construct the six original members of the N class, which entered service between October and December 1885.

Six years later the WMR required additional motive power to handle the growing traffic on their line from Wellington to Longburn, just south of Palmerston North. Its typical supplier of equipment was Baldwin, who offered the WMR a locomotive similar to the N class. The WMR ordered two such locomotives and they entered service as Nos. 9 and 10. They proved to be more efficient than the 1885 batch, and in an attempt to match these efficiencies the government converted N 27 into a Vauclain compound, but with little success.

In 1901, the New Zealand government railways ordered four similar locomotives.

=== Subclasses ===
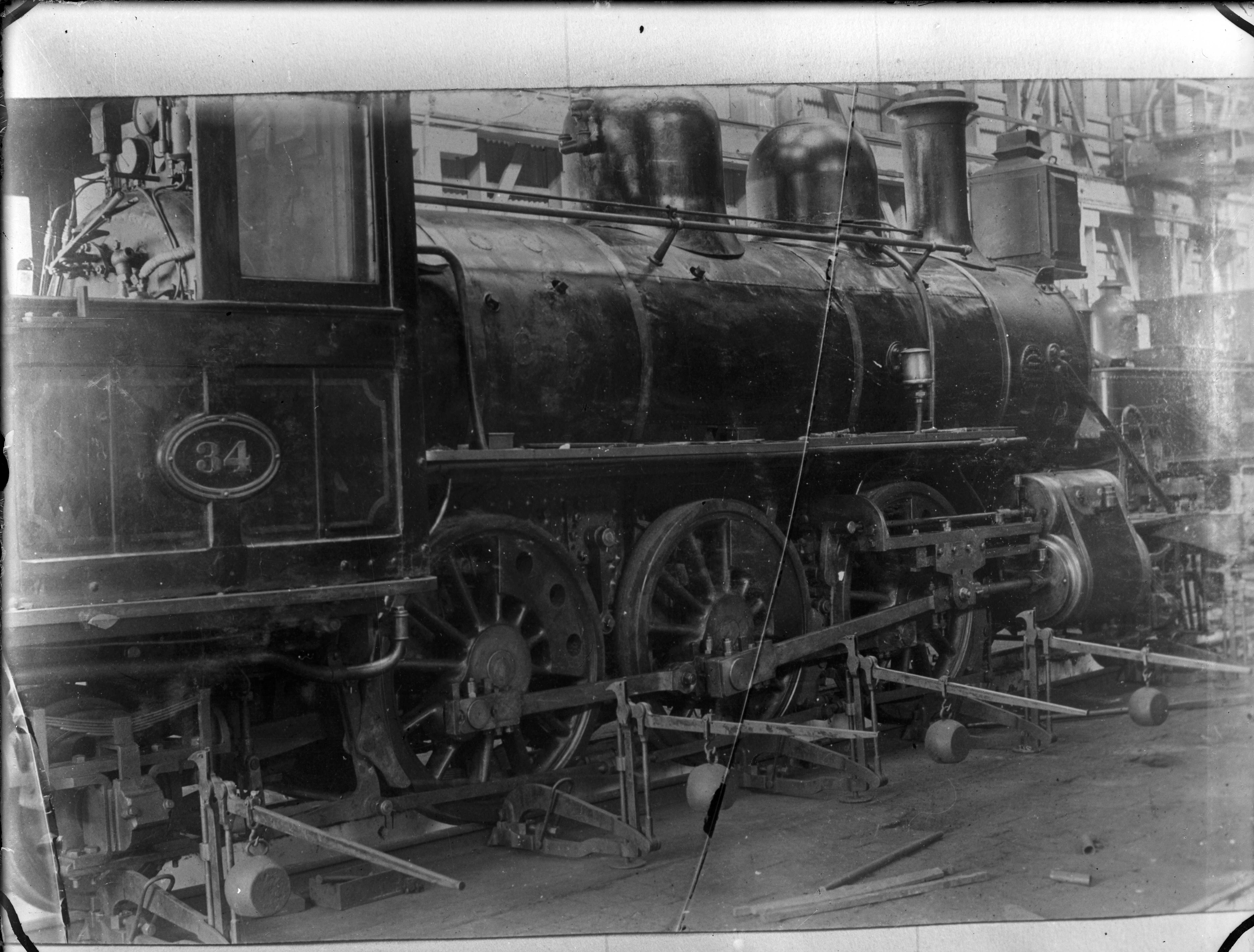
N class steam locomotive, NZR 34, 2-6-2 type, being weighed at the Petone Railway Workshops.

Two sub-classes of the N class existed, both Baldwin Vauclain compounds built for the WMR. Nos. 14 and 15 were a heavier and more powerful version of the N class and became the N^{A} class; Nos. 5 and 18 had wider fireboxes and became the N^{C} class.

== Operation ==
The 1885 batch operated in the Hutt Valley and the Wairarapa; the 1901 batch around Auckland. Around 1900 they were used on the Napier Express coupled with an (rather ineffectual) M class loco; the duo was called a 'en and chicken.

In 1908 the WMR was nationalised and incorporated into the government's network. The two ex-WMR Ns continued to work on their home route until World War I, when they were transferred to Westland to operate the mail trains between Greymouth and Otira, making full use of their speed. In the 1920s the two were modified for shunting duties, including the addition of a tender cab and side ladders on the tender.

=== Speed record ===
The N class's most notable feat occurred on 20 July 1892. WMR No. 10 departed Wellington with a special test train, and gradually picked up speed on the flat trackage of the Kāpiti Coast and Horowhenua. It ran steady at speeds of 50–55 mph (80–89 km/h), and between Levin and Shannon reached 64.4 mph (103.6 km/h), then the world speed record on 3 ft 6 in (1,067 mm) narrow gauge track. The Cape gauge steam speed record would later be taken by the JNR Class C62 in 1954, reaching 129 km/h (80 mph) on the Tokaido Main Line.

== Withdrawal ==
By the 1920s withdrawal was seriously considered. The first two were withdrawn in November 1926; the boiler from WMR No. 9/N 453, withdrawn on 13 November 1926, was re-used on W^{B} 300 when it was overhauled, distinguishing it from others of its class. Three more were withdrawn in March 1927, and N 27, the first member of the class, followed in November of that year. Record-setting WMR No. 10/N 454 was also meant to be withdrawn in 1927 but was given a reprieve: its crews formally complained about its poor condition and it ceased service on 30 January 1928. It was stripped of useful parts and sat in Greymouth yard until it was officially written off on 31 March 1928. It was dumped in the Waimakariri River as a means of stabilising the riverbank. The last N was taken out of service in March 1934.

== Preservation ==
None of the N class were saved for preservation - they were withdrawn at least two decades before the preservation movement had even seriously begun. However, the chassis of WMR No. 9/N 453 was discovered near Arthur's Pass, dumped in the Bealey River, and it was recovered by the Wellington and Manawatu Railway Trust in stages between 2003 and 2006 with the aim of restoring it to full operational condition. On 27 February 2007, No. 9 returned to its old home of Paekakariki and is now based at the depot of Steam Incorporated, where it is undergoing restoration to working order.

By May 2009, No.9's tender had been dismantled, and the frames and bogies overhauled and reassembled.

Railway enthusiasts have also attempted to find the remnants of WMR No. 10/N 454 but have not yet had success.

== See also ==
- Locomotives of New Zealand
