= Arthur Fulton =

Arthur Fulton may refer to:

- Arthur Fulton (engineer)
- Arthur Fulton (sport shooter)
