= Wellington–Manawatu line =

Railway line in New Zealand

The Wellington and Manawatu line is a section of New Zealand's North Island Main Trunk (NIMT) between Wellington and Palmerston North. Originally a government project, the line (initially known as the West Coast railway) was constructed by the private Wellington and Manawatu Railway Company between Thorndon in Wellington and Longburn near Palmerston North, and bought by the government in December 1908. Today, the line is a part of the NIMT, and Kāpiti Line commuter services and the Wellington-Palmerston North Capital Connection services use the line, as well as KiwiRail long-haul freight services.

== History ==
=== Proposals ===
Proposals for a railway line on the west coast of the North Island predated proposals for a railway line from Wellington to the Wairarapa, but land-owning interests in the Wairarapa saw that the latter line was given higher priority. Proposals for a line along the west coast did not resurface until 1878, following the completion of the Palmerston North - Foxton Line in 1876. Proposals were based on the line from the Hutt Valley. The Public Works Department conducted a number of surveys and concluded there were three possible routes:

- from Upper Hutt via the Akatarawa Valley to Waikanae
- from Taitā in the Hutt Valley to Paekākāriki via Haywards; or
- via Johnsonville and Porirua.

The final option was settled on, as the first two required significant tunnelling, then not feasible (Wellington had a population of just 22,000 in 1878).

=== Construction ===
The government of Sir George Grey approved the construction of the line, which was included in the Public Works Estimates, reported to the House of Representatives on 27 August 1878. The final details of the survey were completed, and the first construction workers were hired on 21 August 1879. However, Grey's government was defeated in October 1879, and the government of Sir John Hall elected in its place. Hall had the line removed from the Public Works Estimates and then created a Royal Commission to review the government's public works programme, with a view to reducing government expenditure. The Commission reviewed the Wellington - Manawatu line in March 1880, and concluded that work should be abandoned.

In response, John Plimmer, considered the "father of Wellington", proposed the formation of a private company to build and operate the line. The Wellington Chamber of Commerce supported the move, and the Wellington and Manawatu Railway Company was formed in May 1881. That year the government passed the Railway Construction and Land Act, which allowed joint stock companies to build and run private railways, so long as they were built to the government's specified gauge and connected with a government line. The company signed a contract to construct the line in 1882, acquiring the land on which the line was to be built and materials used in the abandoned section of the line. Only one change was made to the Public Works surveys - the line was to connect with the government's line at Longburn, instead of Foxton, leaving the Palmerston North - Foxton Line a branch line.

The company immediately let contracts for construction from Wellington to Wadestown, now part of the Johnsonville Line. They hired Harry Higginson, a distinguished engineer from Dunedin, to oversee construction. Higginson brought with him brothers Arthur and James Fulton. Arthur Fulton was given responsibility for the Longburn to Waikanae section, and James the Waikanae to Wellington section. A contract was let in April 1882 for the construction of the Longburn - Manawatu River section, which included the Manawatu River bridge, the longest on the line. Higginson had a special wharf built on the Manawatu River near the bridge site, to allow steamers to offload construction materials for the bridge. In August the Wadestown - Crofton section contract was let, with the construction of two tunnels. The next contract let was for Johnsonville to Porirua, including the Belmont Viaduct, the highest on the line. The formation reached Paremata by mid-January 1885, with rails being laid over this section six months later.

The No 12 or Pukerua contract, from Paremata to Pukerua Bay, was completed in 1885.

The next section, the No 13 Contract from Pukerua Bay to Paekākāriki, was the most difficult. It included six tunnels built against a steep cliff face. A temporary tramway was constructed from below No. 13 tunnel to allow goods and passengers to be transhipped to a stagecoach to Foxton. Material for the construction of the tunnels between Paekākāriki and Pukerua Bay were unloaded at a makeshift wharf constructed in Brendan's Bay. Meanwhile, rails were within two miles of Waikanae in the north by 25 September, with a service from Otaki connecting the two railheads. The laying of the line from Pukerua Bay to Paekākāriki was completed on 4 October 1886, and on 27 October the lines from Waikanae and Paekākāriki met at Otaihanga. The first revenue-earning train, a stock train from Longburn to Johnsonville with 355 sheep and 60 head of cattle, was on 30 October.

The section was officially opened on 3 November 1886, when the last spike was driven at a public ceremony by the Governor of New Zealand, Sir William Jervois. A public timetable was introduced on 1 December 1886.

== Operation ==
In 1948, the traffic over the 24 mile (38.5 km) Wellington to Paekakariki section averaged 30 passenger trains, 18 goods trains and 13 light engines (ED class) daily, with 67 daily crossings; opinion was that train delays were less frequent and of shorter duration with CTC than with Tyers Tablet control in 1937. The average tons per train was 474 tons per train northward and 473 southward, with passenger trains just over 560 tons in aggregate.

== Deviation and electrification ==
In 1928, work began on a deviation to avoid the difficult section of the line between Wellington and Tawa through Johnsonville. The deviation required the construction of two significant tunnels between Kaiwharawhara and Tawa. It opened as a single-track line to freight on 24 July 1935 and as a double-track line to passengers on 19 June 1937. The Wellington to Johnsonville section was retained as the Johnsonville Line.

Electrification from Wellington to Paekakariki was completed on 24 July 1940, avoiding the smoke nuisance in the new deviation's lengthy second tunnel, and providing extra tractive effort on the Paekakariki Hill between Pukerua Bay and Paekakariki. Paekakariki became a major station where long-distance trains swapped from steam (later diesel) to electric motive power and became the northern terminus of the commuter line for many years. Electrification was extended to Paraparaumu on 7 May 1983 and to Waikanae on 20 February 2011.

== Duplication ==
The W&MR constructed the line as a single-track railway with crossing loops at principal stations to allow opposing trains to pass. In the 1920s, the need for extra train services on the line was recognised, both to increase the tonnage of goods trains and to allow more frequent suburban passenger services. To increase the number of trains that the line could carry, duplication and electrification of the line along with other improvements, such as curve easements, were planned and progressed in stages. The first section to be double-tracked (from Wellington to Tawa Flat (now Tawa) was the Tawa Flat deviation. It bypassed the steep (1 in 36 to 40) grades from Wellington to Ngaio on the Johnsonville Line. The sections from Tawa to Porirua and subsequently from Porirua to the Pukerua Bay saddle were later double-tracked.

As part of the Plimmerton to Paekakariki duplication, a Westinghouse three-wire (two feed and one return) Centralised Train Control (CTC) system was installed in 1940 to control trains from Wellington. It was the first CTC system in New Zealand and the first outside the United States of America. This avoided the need for two new signal boxes at the North and South junctions and the need with "tablet" working to continuously man five stations with 3 or 4 tablet porters at each station (3 tablet porters at Porirua, Paremata and Pukerua Bay; and 4 tablet porters at Tawa Flat and Plimmerton); so requiring 19 men for traffic working instead of 8 with CTC (and also 11 staff houses). CTC working applied between Paekakariki and Plimmerton on 25 February, Plimmerton and Paremata on 30 June and Tawa to Porirua on 4 December 1940; giving full traffic control from Wellington to Paekakariki (as Wellington to Tawa was double-tracked).

From 14 June 1943 a siding for the US Marines' camp at Mackays Crossing with a crossing loop and tablet station was opened; near where the Wellington Tramway Museum is now located. With duplication of the track from Paekakariki to Mackays Crossing and automatic signalling from Paekakariki to Paraparaumu, Mackays Crossing was relay worked from the Paekakariki South signal box from December 1943. But on 25 March 1946 the catch points and two cross-overs of the siding were lifted, and Mackays Crossing became the point where the double-track section north ended.

Further duplication was delayed in the 1940s but continued in the 1950s with the completion of the Tawa to Porirua section on 15 December 1957. Double track from Porirua to Mana was opened on 7 November 1960. Harbour reclamation allowed mostly straight track with the line no longer following the curves of the shoreline bays north of Porirua; the previous 200m radius curves had a speed limit of 50 km/h.

A new station at Paremata was required, and a new Paremata Inlet bridge. The Mana to Plimmerton section and bridge was opened on 16 October 1961.

In conjunction with the extension of electrification to Paraparaumu in March 1983, the double-track was extended from Paekakariki to Mackays Crossing on 5 December 1983. The section between Mackays Crossing and Paraparaumu, built across a peat swamp, remained single track. Extension of double track from Mackays Crossing to a junction south of the Waikanae River bridge was completed in February 2011 to coincide with the extension of electrification to Waikanae.

The North–South Junction section north of the South Junction (north of the former Muri Station, at the top of the Pukerua Saddle) and with five short single-track tunnels to the North Junction (at the northern portal of No 13 tunnel) before Paekakariki and along the coast below the steep and unstable Paekakariki Escarpment remains as a single track.

=== Gradients ===
Until the Tawa Flat deviation opened in 1937, the ruling gradient was 1 in 36. After 1937 that summit was reduced from 518 ft (158 m) near Khandallah, to 195 ft (59 m) near Takapu Road, with a 1 in 100 climb from Tawa and 1 in 122 from Kaiwharawhara, on which, with a heavy express, the ED electric locos were reduced to little more than 30 mph (48 km/h) at the summit. The other summit, near Pukerua Bay, is 80 m (260 ft), with a 1 in 57 gradient towards Plimmerton and 1 in 60 towards Paekakariki. On the 1 in 57, the EDs could reach 35 mph (56 km/h) with suburban trains, though they damaged track on the 10 chains (200 m) radius curves, whereas steam power had rarely exceeded 20 mph (32 km/h).

=== Accidents ===
For accidents on the single-track section between Pukerua Bay and Paekakariki see North–South Junction.

== List of railway contracts ==
The following contracts were let by the WMR for the construction of the line in 1882-85; The northern section supervised by James Fulton comprised (from North to South):

- No 7 Contract Palmerston (actually to Longburn, and including the Manawatu River Bridge) let to the Wilkie Brothers
- No 11 Contract Palmerston let to the Wilkie Brothers
- No 13 Contract Manawatu let to the Wilkie Brothers
- No 14 Contract Manawatu let to Seymour of Auckland (on 25 March 1884)
- No 16 Contract Otaki let to P Campbell & Co of Dunedin
- No 17 Contract Waikanae (Nos 17, 18 were not called until 14 July 1885)
- No 18 Contract Waikanae

The southern section supervised by Arthur Fultoncomprised (from North to South):

- No 13 Contract Paekakariki let to Samuel Brown. The most difficult contract. Now part of the North–South Junction.
- No 12 Pukerua Contract from Paremata Bridge with a four-mile climb to the Pukerua Saddle (above the Plimmerton - now Taupo swamp)
- No 10 Contract from Porirua to (and including) the Paremata (estuary) Bridge let to Henderson and Co of Dunedin
- No 8 Contract beyond Johnsonville to Porirua including the Belmont Viaduct let to Danaker.
- No 9 Contract from Crofton (Ngaio) to Johnsonville with two tunnels (No 6,7) between Khandallah and Johnsonvillle let to Anderson & Co.
- No 6 (Crofton section) Contract with two tunnels before Crofton (No 4,5) and an embankment between them let to P McGrath (who failed) then Trevor and Shields.
- No 7 Contract (Wadestown section); the first section from Wellington with three tunnels (No 1,2,3) plus the bridge over the Hutt Road and harbour reclamation for the terminus (22 then 29 acres) for the expanded terminus let to J Sanders (who failed) then Trevor and Shields

== See also ==
- Wellington and Manawatu Railway Company
- Johnsonville Line
- Kāpiti Line
- North–South Junction (from Pukerua Bay to Paekakariki)
