= NA class =

NA class may refer to:

- NZR NA class, 2-6-2 steam locomotives
- Victorian Railways NA class, 2-6-2T steam locomotives
