= NZR OB class =

NZR O^{B} class
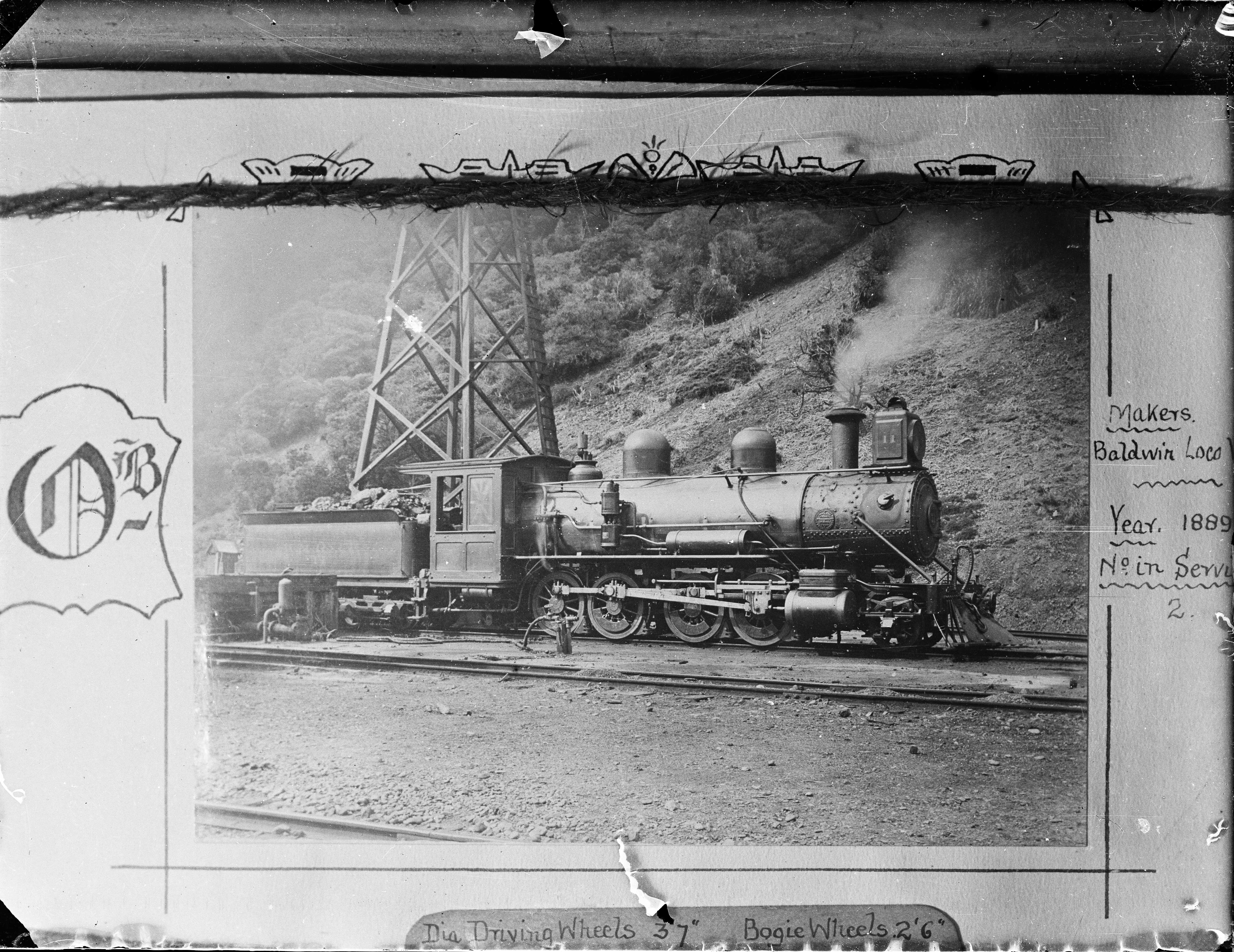
- Wellington and Manawatu Railway 11, circa 1904
Type and origin
- Power type: Steam
- Builder: Baldwin Locomotive Works
- Serial number: 9018, 9021
- Build date: 1888
- Total produced: 2
Specifications
- Configuration
  - Whyte: 2-8-0
  - UIC: 1′C n
- Gauge: 3 ft 6 in (1,067 mm)
- Driver dia.: 43 in (1.092 m)
- Length: 51 ft 3 in (15.62 m)
- Adhesive weight: 34 long tons 6 cwt (76,800 lb or 34.9 t); 34 long tons 6 hundredweight (34.9 t; 38.4 short tons)
- Loco weight: 38 long tons 10 cwt (86,200 lb or 39.1 t); 38 long tons 10 hundredweight (39.1 t; 43.1 short tons)
- Tender weight: 19 long tons 2 cwt (42,800 lb or 19.4 t); 19 long tons 2 hundredweight (19.4 t; 21.4 short tons)
- Fuel type: Coal
- Fuel capacity: 3 long tons 10 cwt (7,800 lb or 3.6 t); 3 long tons 10 hundredweight (3.6 t; 3.9 short tons)
- Water cap.: 1,500 imp gal (6,800 L; 1,800 US gal)
- Firebox
  - Grate area: 16.5 sq ft (1.53 m^{2})
- Boiler pressure: 165 lbf/in^{2} (1,138 kPa)
- Heating surface: 1,013 sq ft (94.1 m^{2})
- Cylinders: Two, outside
- Cylinder size: 16 in × 20 in (406 mm × 508 mm)
- Valve gear: Stephenson
- Valve type: Slide valves
Performance figures
- Tractive effort: 15,177 lbf (67.51 kN)
Career
- Operators: Wellington and Manawatu Railway; New Zealand Government Railways
- Numbers: WMR 11, 12; NZR 455, 456
- Locale: Wellington - Longburn section
- Retired: 1931, 1929
- Disposition: Withdrawn

The O^{B} class was the first class of steam locomotives constructed by the Baldwin Locomotive Works for the Wellington and Manawatu Railway Company (WMR) in New Zealand. The class consisted of two locomotives ordered in 1888, and they entered service in September of that year as WMR No.'s 11 and 12.

When the WMR and its locomotive fleet was acquired by the government and merged into the national New Zealand Railways (NZR) in 1908, the two locomotives were considered to be similar to the O class but with enough differences to warrant the separate O^{B} classification. No. 11 became O^{B} 455 and No. 12 became O^{B} 456, and they ended their days working around Napier. O^{B} 456 was retired in September 1929, and was followed in March 1931 by O^{B} 455, which had survived to be one of the final operating locomotives of WMR heritage, along with N^{C} 461 and U^{D} 465, both of which were withdrawn in the same month.
