= Vauclain compound =

Type of compound steam locomotive

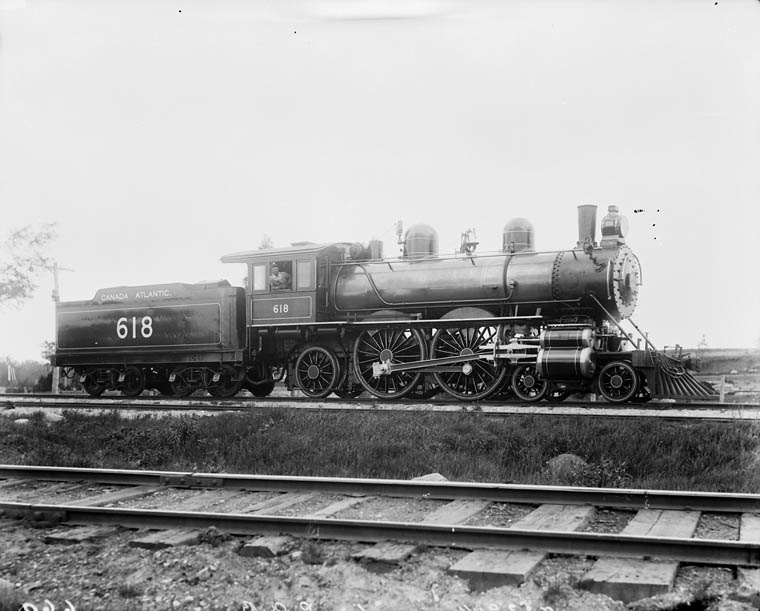
Vauclain compound Engine 618 of the Canada Atlantic Railway

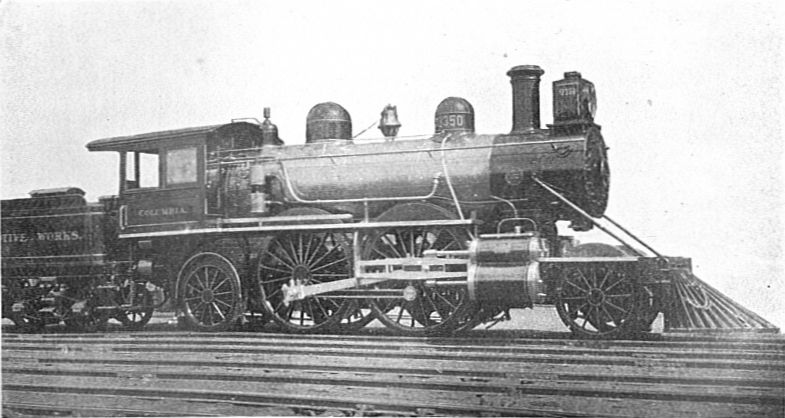
Baldwin Works high-speed 2-4-2 locomotive

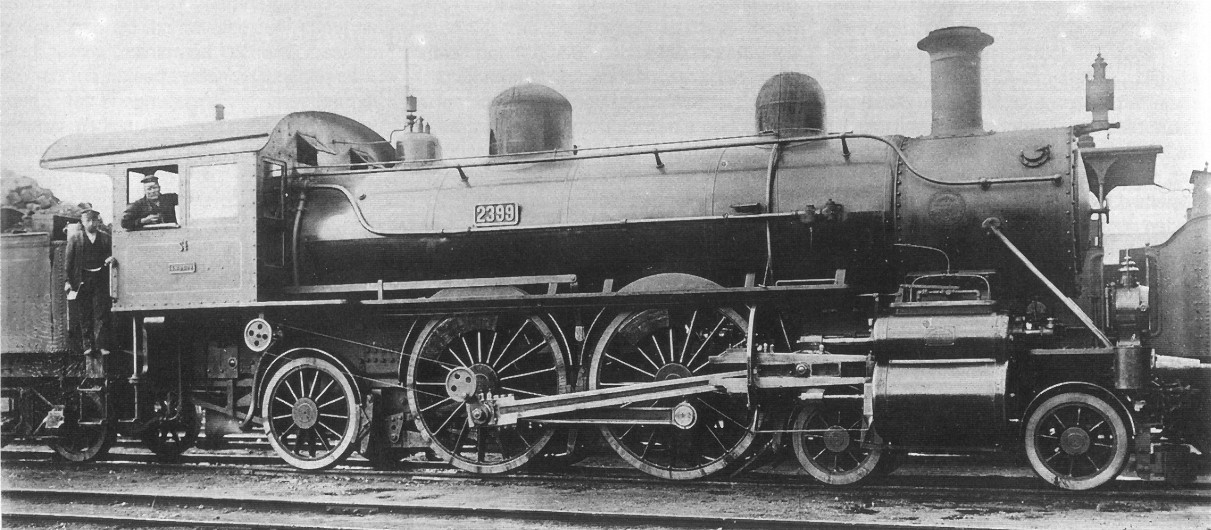
Royal Bavarian State Railways S 2/5

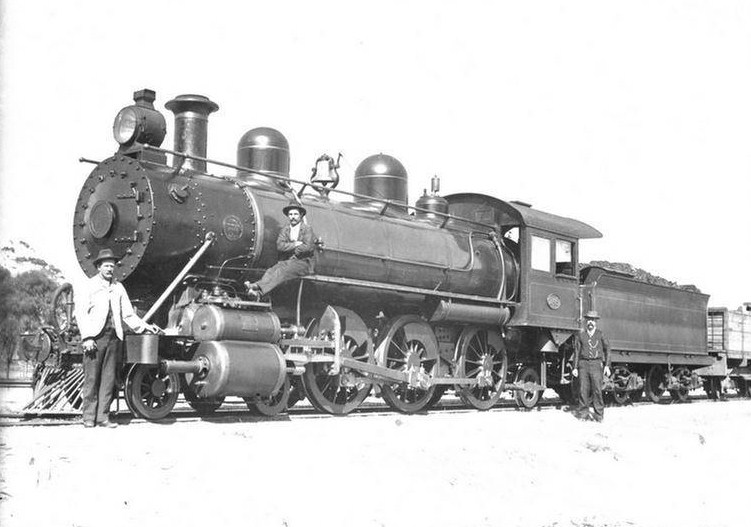
WAGR Ec class showing typical application of Vauclain compound system; note connection of both cylinders to crosshead and the valve chamber inboard of the high-pressure cylinder

The Vauclain compound was a type of compound steam locomotive that was briefly popular from the early 1890s to the mid-1900s. Developed by the Baldwin Locomotive Works, it featured two pistons moving in parallel, driving a common crosshead and controlled by a common valve gear using a single, complex piston valve.

== Advantages and disadvantages ==
The arrangement's claimed advantage, as with other compounding arrangements, was greater economy due to lower fuel and water consumption. In practice uneven forces at the crosshead produced excess wear, with increased maintenance costs thus offsetting any fuel economies. The compounding system's integration into the cylinder saddle made conversion to conventional engines straightforward, so most Vauclain compounds were converted to normal locomotives thereafter. The last known operable example was Manitou and Pikes Peak Railway No. 4, which is now preserved on-site as a static display with its sister #5.

== Design ==
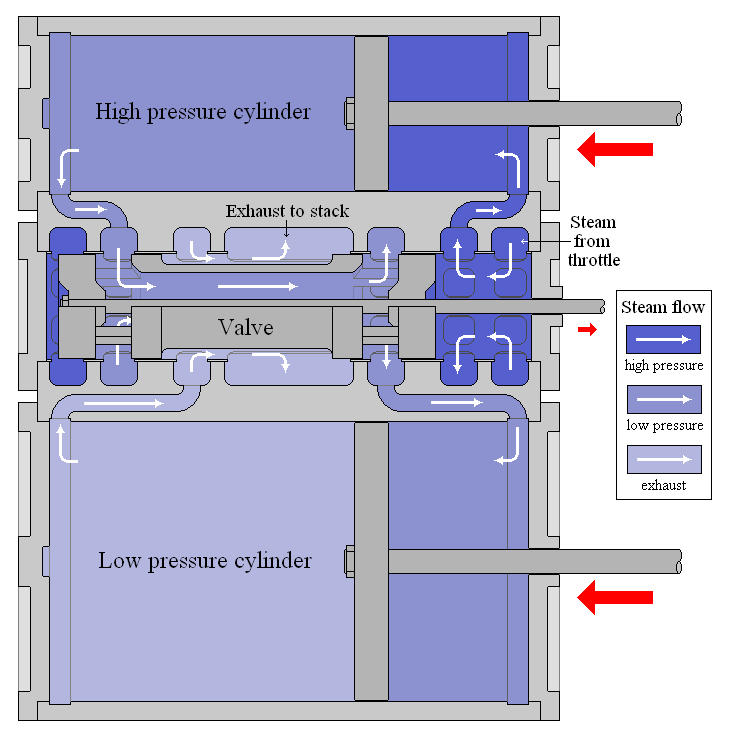
Steam flow in the valve and cylinders near the beginning of the stroke; note how the low-pressure steam flows through the center of the valve

The key to the Vauclain compound is its valve system. In essence, there is an extra system of valves, concentric with the usual middle steam passage in conventional single expansion piston valves. This passage connects the high-pressure cylinder exhaust to the low-pressure cylinder intake. The driving pistons are rigidly connected to either side of the crosshead, so that they move in concert. As high-pressure steam is admitted to one side of the high-pressure cylinder, the low-pressure steam exhausted from the other side is passed through the valves to the opposite side of the engine and into the low-pressure cylinder; finally the exhaust steam from the opposite side of the low-pressure cylinder escapes through the center part of the valve to the blastpipe.

The high- and low-pressure cylinders were mounted in vertical line with each other, with the piston rods in parallel. Usually the low-pressure cylinder was on the bottom, but clearance issues sometimes caused it to be put on the top. In the former case, the valve cylinder was mounted directly inboard from the high-pressure cylinder; in the latter case, the valves were also placed inboard, but at a level between the two power cylinders. The placement of the valves necessitated an inside-connected valve gear, and the Stephenson pattern was used (being the dominant type of the era anyway). One extra appliance required was a starting valve, manually controlled, which allowed admission of high-pressure boiler steam directly to the low-pressure intake. Without this, the low-pressure cylinders would have to actually work against atmospheric pressure.

Each side of the locomotive had its own separate engine, as with conventional locomotives. This eliminated the connections between sides characteristic of cross-compound engines, where the low- and high-pressure cylinders were on opposite sides. The direct flow of steam between the high- and low-pressure cylinders on each side of the locomotive eliminated the need for a receiving chamber to store the steam. It also avoided subjecting the locomotive frame to unequal forces from separate high- and low-pressure sides. The whole package was compact and took up little more space than conventional equipment. Indeed, at first glance from the side the Vauclain compound can be mistaken for a conventional simple locomotive; the only giveaways are the unusual arrangement of the crosshead and (viewed from the front) the extra cylinder.

The scheme did not produce a more powerful locomotive; the maximum practical tractive force was governed by the weight on the drivers, and this did not change. The advantage was efficiency: the compounding reduced the steam required for the same performance. According to Baldwin's standard sizing tables, the high-pressure cylinder on the compound was about 70% the diameter of the single cylinder of the conventional engine; therefore, steam consumption for the same stroke and degree of cutoff was about half that of the conventional engine. In practice lesser results were generally achieved, with Baldwin in 1900 reporting trials by various railroads showing fuel savings of 17% to 45%. To produce symmetrical forces, the low-pressure cylinders had to be about 66% larger in diameter than the high, or about 20% larger than conventional cylinders; for small drivers this could lead to the clearance issues mentioned earlier, thus requiring the low-pressure cylinders to be on top.

== History ==
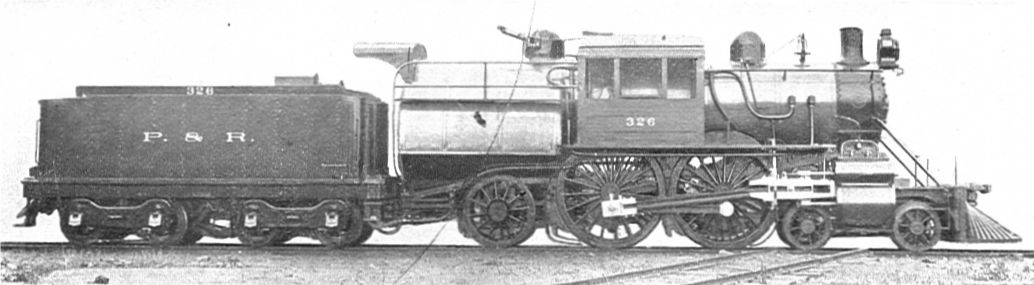
Philadelphia and Reading Railroad, 4-4-2 Vauclain compound locomotive, 4002

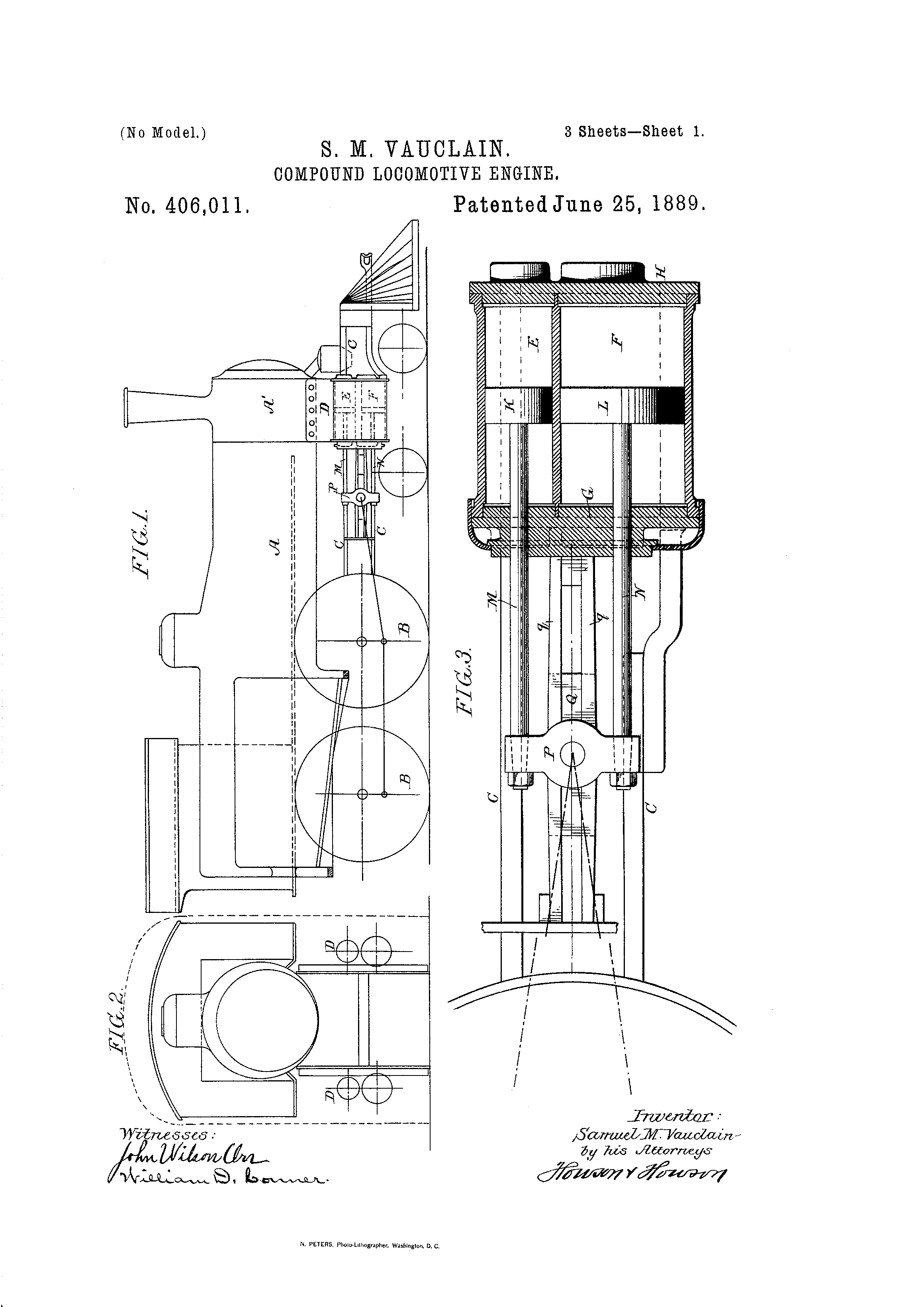
Image from the 1889 U.S. patent issued to cover the Vauclain compound.

The Vauclain compound was introduced in 1889 through U.S. patent 406,011 by its namesake and the then general superintendent of Baldwin and eventually president of the company, Samuel M. Vauclain. Soon most Baldwin customers were operating some examples. A brochure from 1900 lists sales to 140 customers, including large fleets to such Class I railroads as the Baltimore and Ohio Railroad, the Chicago, Milwaukee and St. Paul Railway, the Erie Railroad, the Lehigh Valley Railroad, the Norfolk and Western Railway, and the Philadelphia and Reading Railroad. Many other lines purchased one or two as samples. Vauclain was awarded the Elliott Cresson Medal of the Franklin Institute in 1891 for the locomotive design; in recommending award, the reviewing committee wrote,

"Your committee, in conclusion, find that in view of the state of art, the Vauclain compound locomotive is a distinctly new and original type of locomotive. It is the most marked departure from the usual construction of engines, that has elicited general satisfaction wherever introduced, and in view of the reliable and satisfactory performance in service under the largest variations of conditions, immunity from total disablement, ready adaptability within limits of space incapable of accommodating other compound engines, and general applicability to and utility in railway service, it is, in the opinion of your committee, deserving of recognition by the award of the Elliott Cresson Medal of the Franklin Institute, which they hereby recommend."

This popularity was short-lived. Significant maintenance difficulties appeared, particularly with uneven forces wearing the crosshead guides. The two cylinders were supposed to be proportioned so as to do equal work (with the low pressure being three times larger than the high). Since the steam passed between the low- and high-pressure cylinder is always expanded, even before cutoff, the force produced in the low-pressure cylinder varies differently from that in the high-pressure cylinder. The complex valve assembly and the starter valve also led to increased maintenance costs. The introduction of the superheater further increased efficiency and made it much easier to maintain.

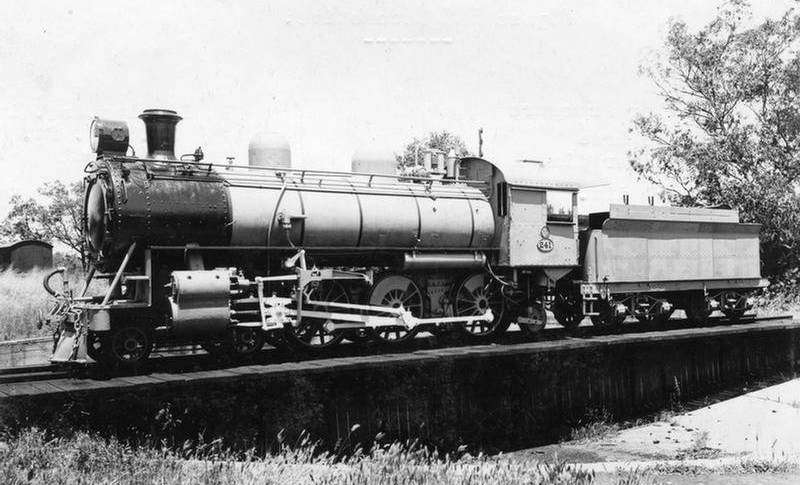
WAGR L class locomotive created by rebuilding class Ec compound

All of the compounding machinery was contained in the valve chest, which in American locomotives (in the days before one piece cast frames) was integral with the smokebox saddle. The whole unit could be unbolted and replaced with conventional single expansion cylinders. That was the typical fate of Vauclain compounds: when the time came for a major overhaul, the compound machinery and Stephenson valve gear were removed, and the engine was rebuilt with superheating, Walschaerts valve gear, and conventional cylinders.

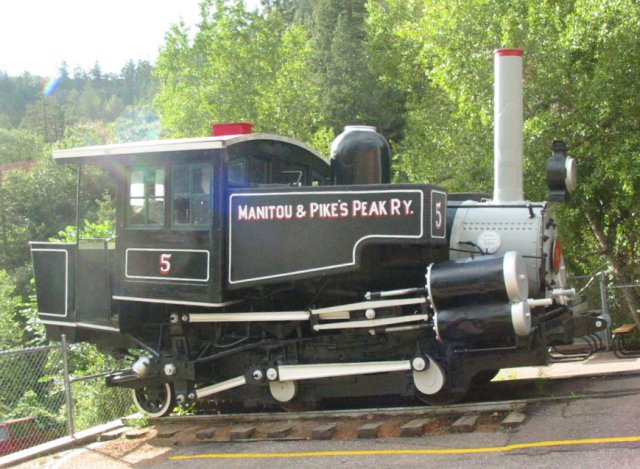
M&PP No. 5, showing the less common configuration with the low-pressure cylinder on top. The valve cylinder is hidden behind the two power cylinders.

Two of the four surviving Manitou and Pike's Peak Railway locomotives were converted to compounding after experience with M&PP No. 4, built in 1893 and at present the only operating Vauclain compound. (Vauclain himself had travelled to the line to deal with operational issues with the original engines in their pre-compounding state.) All six steam locomotives of the line were of this type.

=== Usage in other countries ===
The Vauclain system was used in Europe, and a Danish example (DSB 996) is preserved at Railworld, Peterborough, England.

88 Baldwin-built locomotives, from 1912 designated as V class (for Vauclain, В in Russian), were used in Russia from 1896 until the 1920s on several railroads.

Seven Vauclain compounds were supplied to the Wellington and Manawatu Railway Company (WMR) which operated the Wellington - Manawatu Line in New Zealand. WMR No. 13, built in 1894, was the first compound in New Zealand and the first narrow-gauge compound in the world. In 1908 No. 13 was classified as the NZR Oa class when the WMR was nationalised. Later Vauclain compounds purchased by the WMR were the NZR Na class (No. 14 of 1894 & No. 15 of 1896); NZR Nc class (No. 5 (1901) & No. 18 of 1904); NZR Oc class (No. 16 of 1896); and NZR Bc class (No. 17 of 1901). These had the lower pressure cylinder on top for greater clearance from platforms.

The Gyeongbu Railway, one of the predecessors of the Chosen Government Railway in Korea, bought six in 1906, which were designated Tehoi-class in the CGR's 1938 classification scheme.

The Victorian Railways in Australia operated 16 Vauclain Compound locomotives designated V Class, with the first, imported from Baldwin Locomotive Works, entering service in 1900. The remaining 15 locomotives were built locally to the same design and entered service over the next two years. They were all rebuilt as simple expansion locomotives between 1912 and 1913. They also purchased two narrow gauge locomotives from Baldwin, one with and one without Vauclain equipment. They built one copy of the compound locomotive and fifteen of the simple locomotive. For a significant portion of their operating life the two compound engines were rostered together, separate from the rest of the fleet. Six of the simple locomotives are preserved, five operational; both compound engines were withdrawn by the mid-1930s.

== Bibliography ==
- Description, Method of Operation and Maintenance of the Vauclain System of Compound Locomotives ISBN 978-1-935700-15-9
