= NZR OA class =

NZR O^{A} class
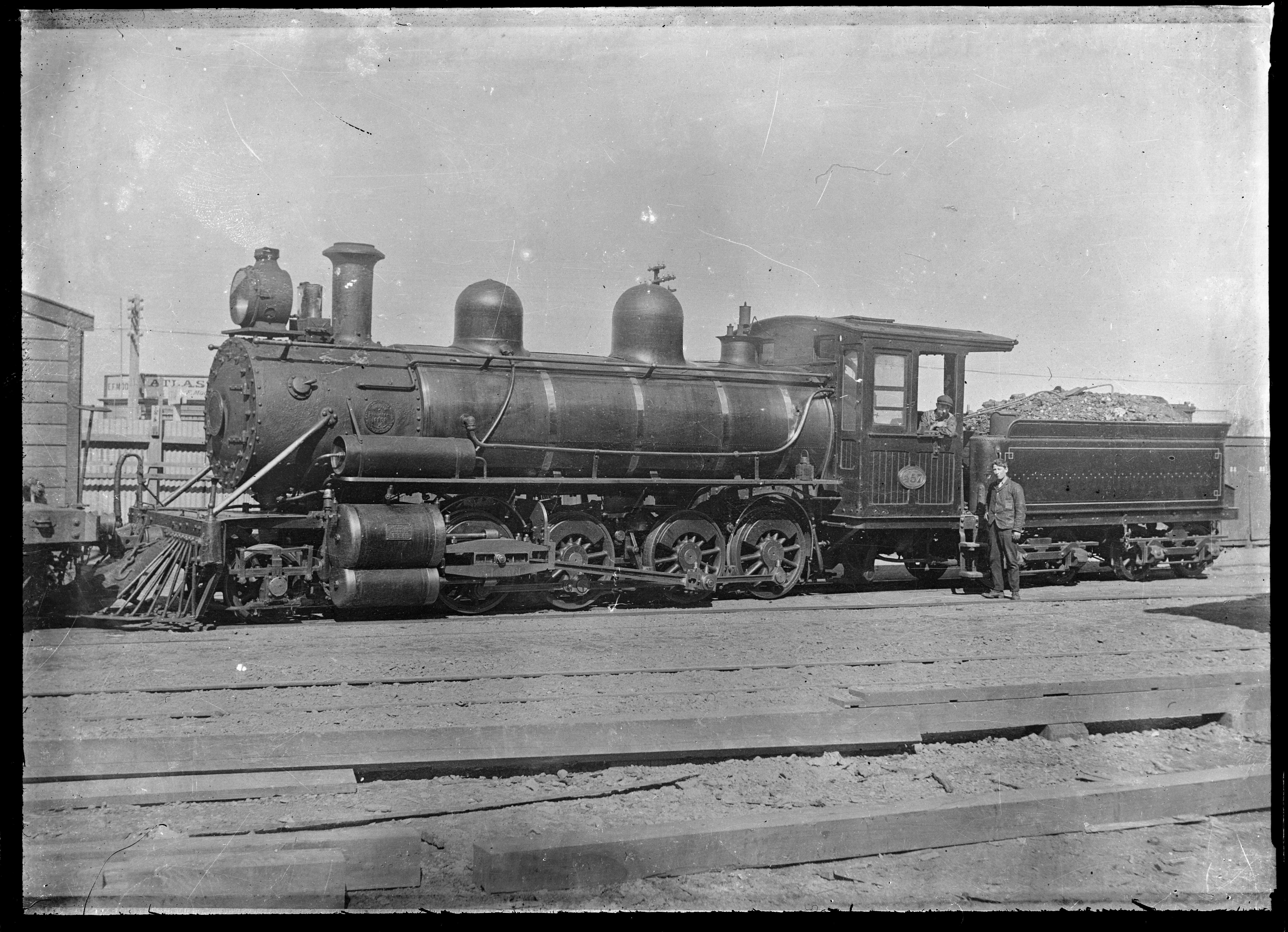
- Oa class 2-8-0 steam locomotive NZR number 457
Type and origin
- Power type: Steam
- Builder: Baldwin Locomotive Works
- Serial number: 13908
- Build date: 1894
Specifications
- Configuration
  - Whyte: 2-8-0
- Gauge: 3 ft 6 in (1,067 mm)
- Driver dia.: 43 in (1.092 m)
- Length: 51 ft 8 in (15.75 m)
- Adhesive weight: 33.7 long tons (34.2 t; 37.7 short tons)
- Total weight: 57.4 long tons (58.3 t; 64.3 short tons)
- Fuel type: Coal
- Firebox
  - Grate area: 16.7 sq ft (1.55 m^{2})
- Boiler pressure: 180 psi (1,241 kPa)
- Heating surface: 1,050 sq ft (98 m^{2})
- Cylinders: four, Vauclain
- High-pressure cylinder: 11 in × 20 in (279 mm × 508 mm)
- Low-pressure cylinder: 18 in × 20 in (457 mm × 508 mm)
Performance figures
- Tractive effort: 13,175 lbf (58.61 kN)
Career
- Operators: Wellington and Manawatu Railway, New Zealand Government Railways
- Number in class: 1
- Numbers: WMR 13; NZR 457
- Locale: Wellington - Longburn section
- Disposition: Withdrawn

The O^{A} class is a solitary steam locomotive built by the Baldwin Locomotive Works for the Wellington and Manawatu Railway (WMR) in New Zealand. Ordered in 1894, it entered service in August of that year as No. 13 and was the first narrow gauge Vauclain compound in the world. In 1908, the WMR and its locomotive fleet were purchased by New Zealand Railways Department (NZR) and incorporated into the national rail network, and, although No. 13 bore a likeness to members of the O class, it was sufficiently different that it warranted separate classification. The designation of O^{A} was created and it was numbered O^{A} 457. It operated for another two decades until it was withdrawn in December 1929 in Auckland. The locomotive was known to WMR staff as "The Lady".

In 1896, a locomotive similar in appearance was ordered by the WMR, No. 16. Its technical specifications were such that when it was acquired by NZR it was classified separately and became the sole member of the O^{C} class.
