= NZR NC class =

NZR N^{C} class
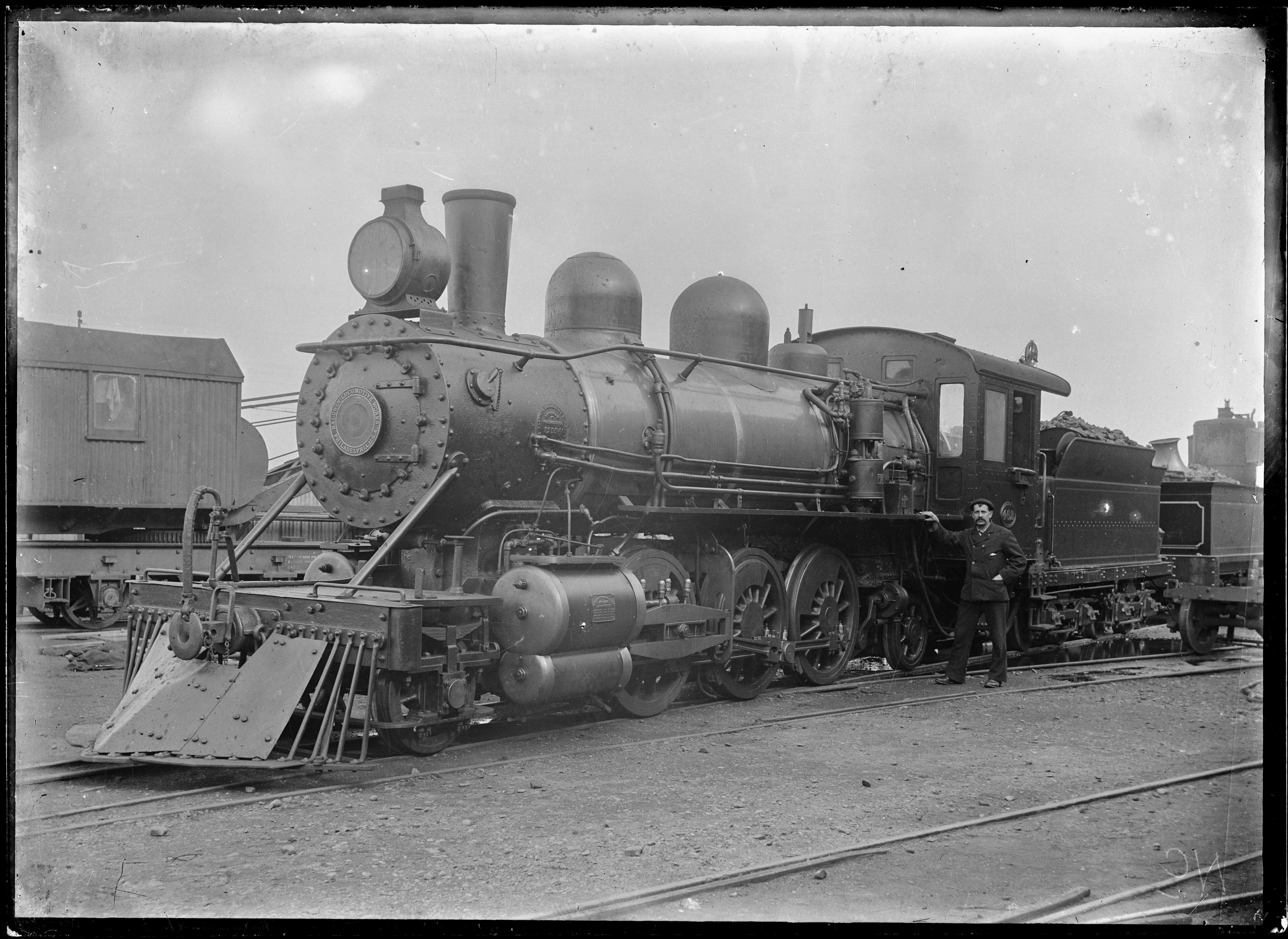
- NZR 462, circa 1909
Type and origin
- Power type: Steam
- Builder: Baldwin Locomotive Works
- Serial number: 19797, 23594
- Build date: 1901, 1904
Specifications
- Configuration
  - Whyte: 2-6-2
- Gauge: 3 ft 6 in (1,067 mm)
- Driver dia.: 49 in (1.245 m)
- Length: 54 ft 10 in (16.71 m) #18
- Adhesive weight: 27.7 long tons (28.1 t; 31.0 short tons)
- Loco weight: 39.7 long tons (40.3 t; 44.5 short tons)
- Tender weight: 23.8 long tons (24.2 t; 26.7 short tons)
- Total weight: 63.5 long tons (64.5 t; 71.1 short tons)
- Fuel type: Coal
- Firebox
  - Grate area: 25 sq ft (2.3 m^{2}) #5; 20.4 sq ft (1.90 m^{2}) #18
- Boiler pressure: 180 psi (1,241 kPa) #5; 200 psi (1,379 kPa) #18
- Heating surface: 1,091 sq ft (101.4 m^{2}) #5; 1,124 sq ft (104.4 m^{2}) #18
- Cylinders: Four (Vauclain compound)
- High-pressure cylinder: 10 in × 20 in (254 mm × 508 mm)
- Low-pressure cylinder: 17 in × 20 in (432 mm × 508 mm)
Performance figures
- Tractive effort: 9,720 lbf (43.24 kN) #5; 10,800 lbf (48.04 kN) #18
Career
- Operators: Wellington and Manawatu Railway, New Zealand Government Railways
- Number in class: 2
- Numbers: WMR 5, 18; NZR 461, 462
- Locale: Wellington - Longburn section, Wairarapa Line
- Retired: September 1928, March 1931
- Disposition: Withdrawn

The NZR N^{C} class was a class of two steam locomotives built by Baldwin Locomotive Works built for service on New Zealand's private Wellington and Manawatu Railway (WMR). They did not acquire their N^{C} classification until the publicly owned New Zealand Railways Department (NZR) purchased the WMR and its locomotive fleet.

The first member of the N^{C} class was ordered in 1901 and entered service in May 1902 as WMR No. 5. Another locomotive built to a very similar design was ordered in 1904 and entered service that same year as WMR No. 18. When the locomotives passed into NZR ownership in 1908, they were considered to be similar enough to be classified together, and while they also bore strong similarities to the members of the N class, they were sufficiently different that a separate classification of N^{C} was used. Their main distinguishing feature was a wider firebox. They were Vauclain compound locomotives.

The two engines served NZR for just over two decades. No. 18, now N^{C} 462, was retired in September 1928, while No. 5, now N^{C} 461, remained in service until March 1931. Their final region of operation is believed to be the Wairarapa, and they are known to have worked the line from the Hutt Valley up the western slope of the Rimutaka Range to the western end of the Rimutaka Incline. Together with O^{B} 455 (ex-WMR No. 11) and U^{D} 465 (ex-WMR No. 20), N^{C} 461 was one of the last surviving locomotives of WMR heritage. All three were withdrawn in March 1931.

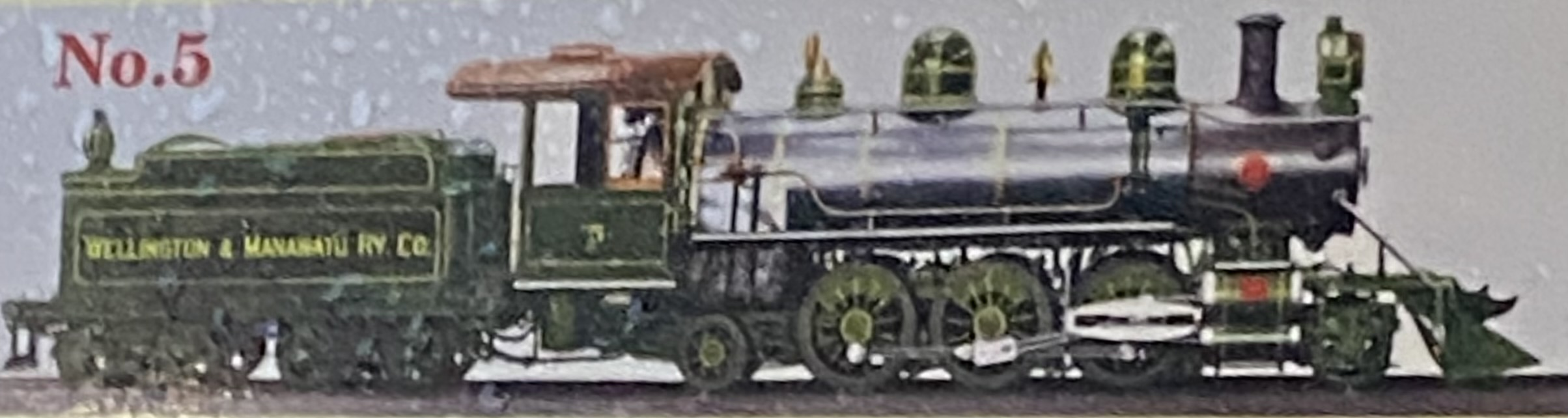
Builders photo of WMR No.5 in Baldwin olive green.
