= Wellington and Manawatu Railway Trust =

Charitable Trust in Wellington, New Zealand

Coordinates: 40°59′10.34″S 174°57′25.7″E

WMR No.9
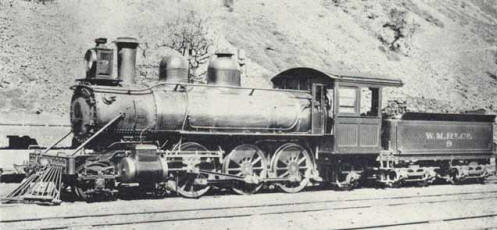
- No. 9 at Paekākāriki, c. 1900.
Type and origin
- Power type: Steam
- Builder: Baldwin Locomotive Works
- Build date: 1891
Specifications
- Configuration
  - Whyte: 2-6-2
- Gauge: 3 ft 6 in (1,067 mm)
- Wheel diameter: 4 ft 1 in (1 m)
- Loco weight: 50.8 t (50.0 long tons; 56.0 short tons)
- Fuel type: Coal
- Boiler pressure: 140 lbf/in^{2} (970 kPa)
- Cylinder size: 15 in × 20 in (381 mm × 508 mm) diameter × stroke
Performance figures
- Maximum speed: 103.6 km/h (64.4 mph)
- Power output: 437 hp (326 kW)
- Tractive effort: 10,260 lbf (45.6 kN)
Career
- Operators: Wellington and Manawatu Railway, New Zealand Government Railways
- Numbers: WMR No.9 later NZR N 453
- Retired: 13 November 1926
- Current owner: Wellington and Manawatu Railway Trust
- Disposition: Under Restoration

The Wellington and Manawatu Railway Trust is a charitable trust based in Wellington, New Zealand, and is actively restoring former Wellington and Manawatu Railway locomotive No.9 (later N 453 under government ownership), to full working order.

== The trust ==
The Wellington and Manawatu Railway Trust was formed to recover and restore former Wellington and Manawatu Railway locomotive No. 9, a Baldwin 2-6-2 from 1891. The Trust has so far managed to recover the locomotive and is in the process of restoring the locomotive. While the Trust's primary focus is No.9, it is also interested in the welfare of remaining Wellington and Manawatu Railway relics which have managed to survive into the modern day. The trust also owns a former Wellington and Manawatu Railway 4-wheel wagon, which is presently stored at the Silver Stream Railway, Upper Hutt. No.9 is the only known surviving Wellington and Manawatu Railway locomotive.

== The locomotive ==
Built by the Baldwin Locomotive Works of Philadelphia in 1891, Maker's No. 12104, Baldwin ID 10 24 1/4 D9 was one of two 2-6-2 wheel arrangement locomotives constructed for the Wellington and Manawatu Railway, and was given the road number 9. No.9 and sister No.10 were constructed to a virtually identical design as the NZR N class of 1885, with notable differences including lengthened smokeboxes, spoked carrying wheels and no air brakes. They were based at the WMR's Paekākāriki depot, and were used primarily to haul mixed passenger and freight trains over the relatively easily graded Paekākāriki - Longburn section of the company's line. In 1892, No.10 set a World Speed Record for the 3 ft 6 in (1,067 mm) gauge of 64.4 mph (103.6 km/h), underlining the type's pedigree.

In 1901 No's 9 & 10 were retrofitted with Westinghouse air brakes as part of the company's drive to fit continuous braking to its entire fleet, completed in 1902. All other changes to the two locos during WMR service were minor, such as replacement of the original pressed steel & copper funnels in cast iron. In December 1908 the Wellington and Manawatu Railway was purchased by the New Zealand Government and incorporated into the government railway system. No.9 was then classified and renumbered N 453. For this role, her WMR insignia was removed, NZR number plates added, tablet hooks were fitted to the cab and the smokebox front replaced with a standard NZR design.

She continued to be based at Paekākāriki until 1916 when she was shipped to Greymouth in the South Island, where she saw service hauling the Greymouth - Otira mail trains. Her wooden cab was replaced at this stage in steel, and acetylene lighting replaced the original kerosene. In the early 1920s she was relegated to shunting and banking duties at Otira. For work in this role, 453 was fitted with back up sanding and a tender-cab, with the tender coal flare cut off and ladders fitted to access the tender body. In 1925 N 453's original boiler was removed and replaced with a new NZR built boiler. Despite this, in November 1926 No.9 was withdrawn from service, dismantled and tipped into the Bealey River on the Midland Line to check erosion. Why the locomotive was removed from service is not known, however all useful and re-usable components from the locomotive were removed, including the boiler which saw further service on Wb 300.

== Recovery of an engine ==
By the end of the 20th century, most of the once numerous locomotive remains in the Bealey River valley had been scrapped or buried in river protection works. No. 9 was the only engine left unaffected, but with an uncertain future.

In 2003, the Trust began recovering the remnants of No. 9 from where it had been dumped near Arthur's Pass along the Midland Line. The locomotive had been dismantled and dumped in November 1926, to stabilise the railway embankment and to try to prevent floods from eroding the formation. The first item recovered was the locomotive frame and cylinders, which were trucked to the Canterbury Steam Preservation Society at McLeans Island, Christchurch. In 2006 the locomotive tender, truck frames and other associated items which had been uncovered were trucked from the dump site to be stored with the frame. The parts were then trucked to Steam Incorporated, Paekākāriki (site of the former WMR depot where No. 9 was based) on 26 February 2007, where restoration has commenced. It is unlikely there is anything more worthy of salvage from the dump site for No.9. The original boiler from No.9 has been located at the Oxford Boiler Dump, but is not worthy of salvage and re-use.

== Restoration ==
No.9s tender chassis reassembled and on the rails for the first time since it was dumped. Taken on 21 May 2009.

In 2006 the Trust signed an agreement with Steam Incorporated, and once No.9 had been moved there restoration began in earnest, with the initial focus being on restoring the tender before tackling the locomotive proper. As a part of the agreement with Steam Incorporated, No.9 is being restored to main line operating standard so that it can be used on the national rail network. While the Trust has managed to acquire a large number of items for use on the locomotive, a new boiler will be required and it is likely new driving wheels will have to be manufactured, as none were recovered with the locomotive from the dump site. By May 2009, the tender frame and bogies had been completely rebuilt and reassembled.

== Other projects ==
The Wellington and Manawatu Railway also owns a 4-wheel wooden-framed wagon of WMR vintage, which is currently stored at the Silver Stream Railway, Upper Hutt. The class of this wagon has yet to be conclusively identified, however it is the Trust's intention to have this wagon restored in due course.

== See also ==
- Railway preservation in New Zealand
- Wellington and Manawatu Railway
- NZR N class
