= NZR WJ class =

NZR W^{J} class
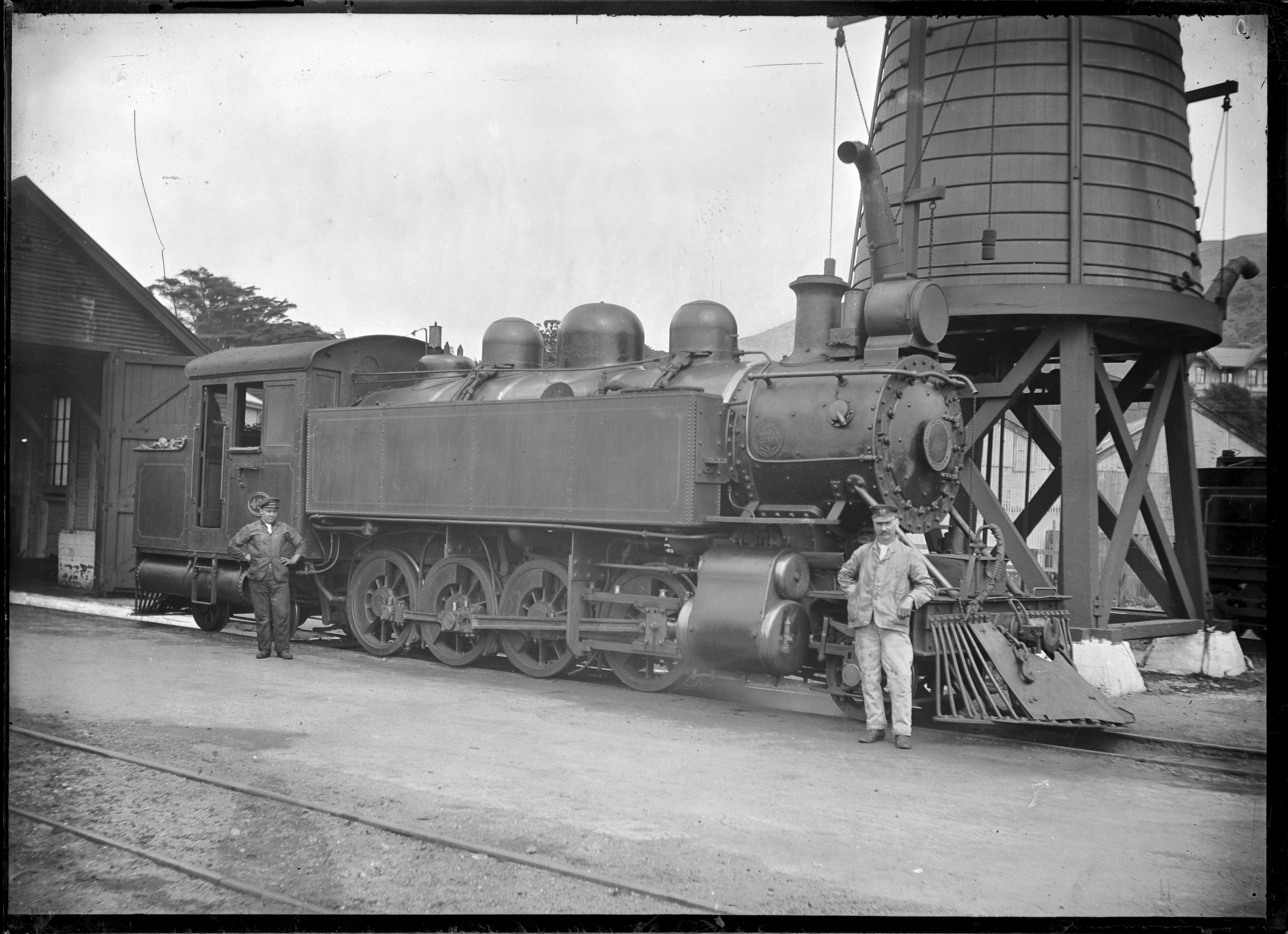
- The former WMR second No. 3 locomotive as NZR 466, W^{J} class. Godber Collection, Alexander Turnbull Library.
Type and origin
- Power type: Steam
- Builder: Baldwin Locomotive Works
- Serial number: 23596
- Build date: 1904
Specifications
- Configuration
  - Whyte: 2-8-4T
- Gauge: 3 ft 6 in (1,067 mm)
- Wheel diameter: 43 in (1.092 m)
- Adhesive weight: 38.0 long tons (38.6 t; 42.6 short tons)
- Loco weight: 53.6 long tons (54.5 t; 60.0 short tons)
- Fuel type: Coal
- Firebox
  - Grate area: 16.7 sq ft (1.55 m^{2})
- Boiler pressure: 200 psi (1,379 kPa)
- Heating surface: 1,080 sq ft (100 m^{2})
- Cylinders: 2
- Cylinder size: 17 in × 20 in (432 mm × 508 mm)
Performance figures
- Tractive effort: 21,510 lbf (95.7 kN)
Career
- Operators: Wellington and Manawatu Railway, New Zealand Government Railways
- Number in class: 1
- Numbers: WMR 3 (1904), NZR 466
- Locale: Wellington - Johnsonville section
- Retired: 31 March 1928
- Disposition: Withdrawn

The NZR W^{J} class was a lone steam locomotive built by Baldwin Locomotive Works for service on New Zealand's private Wellington and Manawatu Railway (WMR). It acquired the W^{J} classification when the publicly owned New Zealand Railways Department (NZR) purchased the WMR and its locomotive fleet in 1908.

== Introduction ==
The locomotive entered service in July 1904 with WMR road No. 3 (reused). It was the first WMR locomotive to have piston valves.

A large 2-8-4T tank engine nicknamed Jumbo, it was based at Wellington for all its life. It was used as a banker out of Wellington up the Ngaio bank to Johnsonville, which had long grades of 1 in 40 up to Crofton (Ngaio) and Khandallah and tunnels No 1 to 5.

It ran 67,907 mi (109,286 km) by 29 February 1908. Jumbo was allegedly hated by both drivers and firemen, but all agreed that it was extremely strong and durable. Like all Baldwin locomotives, it had cast bar frames; in this case, they gave considerable trouble, for they persistently broke immediately behind the smokebox saddle.

When taken into the NZR fleet in 1908, it was allocated its own class and NZR No. 466. With a tendency for breaking its frames on the heavy banking duty, Jumbo saw little service after 1920.

== Withdrawal ==
The locomotive was withdrawn in 1927 and written off on 31 March 1928. The boiler was sent to the Taumarunui locomotive depot for use as a washout boiler.
