= NZR OC class =

New Zealand steam locomotive

NZR O^{C} class
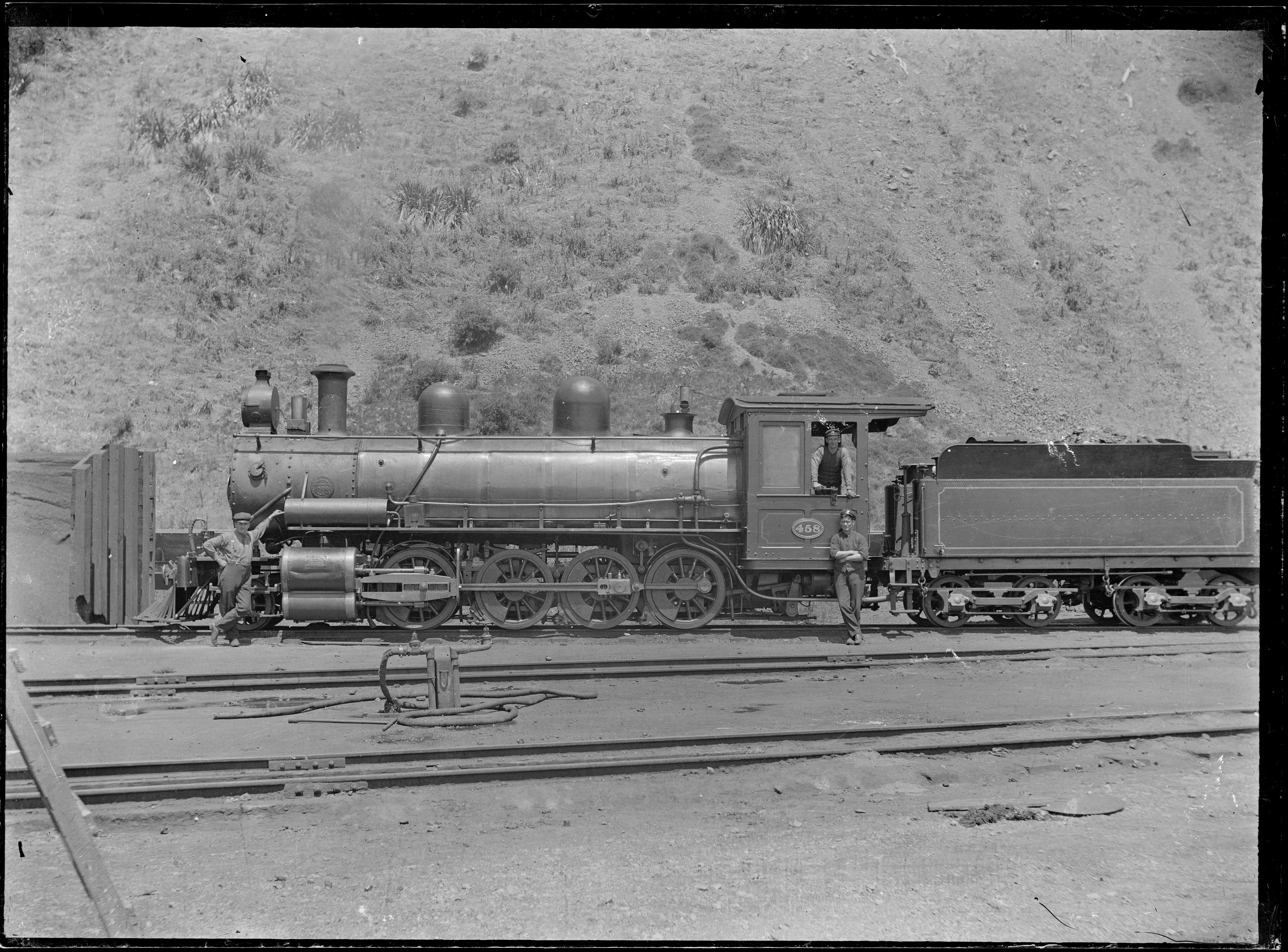
- O^{C} class 2-8-0 steam locomotive NZR number 458
Type and origin
- Power type: Steam
- Builder: Baldwin Locomotive Works
- Serial number: 15055
- Build date: 1896
Specifications
- Configuration
  - Whyte: 2-8-0
  - UIC: 1'D
- Gauge: 3 ft 6 in (1,067 mm)
- Length: 51 ft 8 in (15.75 m)
- Adhesive weight: 36.7 long tons (37.3 t; 41.1 short tons)
- Total weight: 62.8 long tons (63.8 t; 70.3 short tons)
- Firebox
  - Grate area: 16.7 sq ft (1.55 m^{2})
- Boiler pressure: 200 psi (1,379 kPa)
- Heating surface: 1,050 sq ft (98 m^{2})
- High-pressure cylinder: 11 in × 20 in (279 mm × 508 mm)
- Low-pressure cylinder: 18 in × 20 in (457 mm × 508 mm)
Performance figures
- Tractive effort: 15,110 lbf (67.21 kN)
Career
- Operators: Wellington and Manawatu Railway; New Zealand Railways Department
- Number in class: 1
- Numbers: WMR 16; NZR 458
- Retired: July 1930

The O^{C} class, built by the Baldwin Locomotive Works for the Wellington and Manawatu Railway (WMR) in New Zealand, consists of a solitary steam locomotive. Ordered in 1896 as an externally similar but more powerful version of the O^{A} class locomotive ordered in 1894, it entered service in June 1897 as No. 16. It was a Vauclain compound locomotive.

In 1908, the WMR and its locomotive fleet was purchased by the New Zealand Railways Department (NZR) and incorporated into the national rail network, and although No. 16 bore a likeness to members of the O class, it was sufficiently different that it warranted separate classification. Technical differences were sufficient that it was not classified with the visually similar WMR No. 13/NZR O^{A} 457, and it became O^{C} 458. It is known to have operated on the line from the Hutt Valley through the Rimutaka Range to the western end of the Rimutaka Incline, and its final depot was at Cross Creek at the eastern end of the Rimutaka Incline in the Wairarapa. It was withdrawn from service in July 1930.

== Bibliography ==
- Millar, Sean (2011). The NZR Steam Locomotive. Wellington: New Zealand Railway and Locomotive Society. ISBN 978-0-908573-89-9.
- Palmer, A. N.; Stewart, W. W. (1965). Cavalcade of New Zealand Locomotives. Wellington: A H. & A W. Reed. ISBN 978-0-207-94500-7.
- Stewart, W. W. (1974). When Steam was King. Wellington: A. H. & A. W. Reed Ltd. ISBN 978-0-589-00382-1.
