= William Hannay =

William Mowatt Hannay (3 August 1848 – 25 March 1922) was a railways administrator in New Zealand from 1876 to 1908. He was born in Scotland (Castle Douglas near Glasgow) in 1848. He may have worked for a railway company in Glasgow (obituary) or migrated to America where he lived in Brooklyn, New York for some years (Cassells).

He moved to New Zealand in 1875, and from 1 May 1876 was employed by the New Zealand Government Railways; in Dunedin as a goods clerk on a salary of £150 p.a. (per annum). He advanced from 1 August 1877 to Chief Clerk in the Dunedin goods manager's office (£250 p.a.) then to Chief Clerk in the Christchurch goods managers office (£275 p.a.) then assistant traffic manager (£350 p.a.) then five months later secretary for Middle (South) Island Railways (£400 p.a.) ("a remarkable achievement for one so young") then Oamaru as traffic manager on 1 July 1879 (£500 p.a.)

On 12 October 1880 he transferred to Wellington as assistant general manager (£600 p.a, raised to £670 p.a. on 1 July 1881). He reached the top of the government railways with appointment as a Railways Commissioner in 1889, but became redundant in 1895 with reorganisation of the Government railways.

When James Wallace the general manager of the Wellington and Manawatu Railway Company (a private company) retired, Hannay was appointed to replace him. His position was originally as company secretary and paid only £400 p.a. as an economy measure, much lower than he was used to. But he took on his new duties "with a will" and he was promoted to General Manager where he remained until 7 December 1908 when the WMR was absorbed into the New Zealand Government Railways.

He died in Wellington, and is buried in the Bolton Street Cemetery. He was born in Castle Douglas near Glasgow according to the newspaper obituaries (not in England as stated in Cassells).
