= Wellington and Manawatu Railway Company =

Railway company in New Zealand

Wellington & Manawatu Railway Company
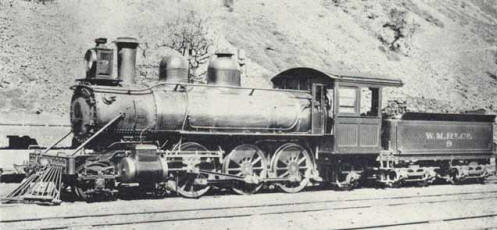
- W&MR No.9 locomotive (later reclassified as an N class) in service at Paekākāriki c. 1900.

Overview
- Headquarters: Wellington
- Reporting mark: W&MR
- Locale: Wellington, New Zealand
- Dates of operation: 1885–1908
- Successor: New Zealand Railways Department

Technical
- Track gauge: 3 ft 6 in (1,067 mm)
- Length: 135 km (84 mi)

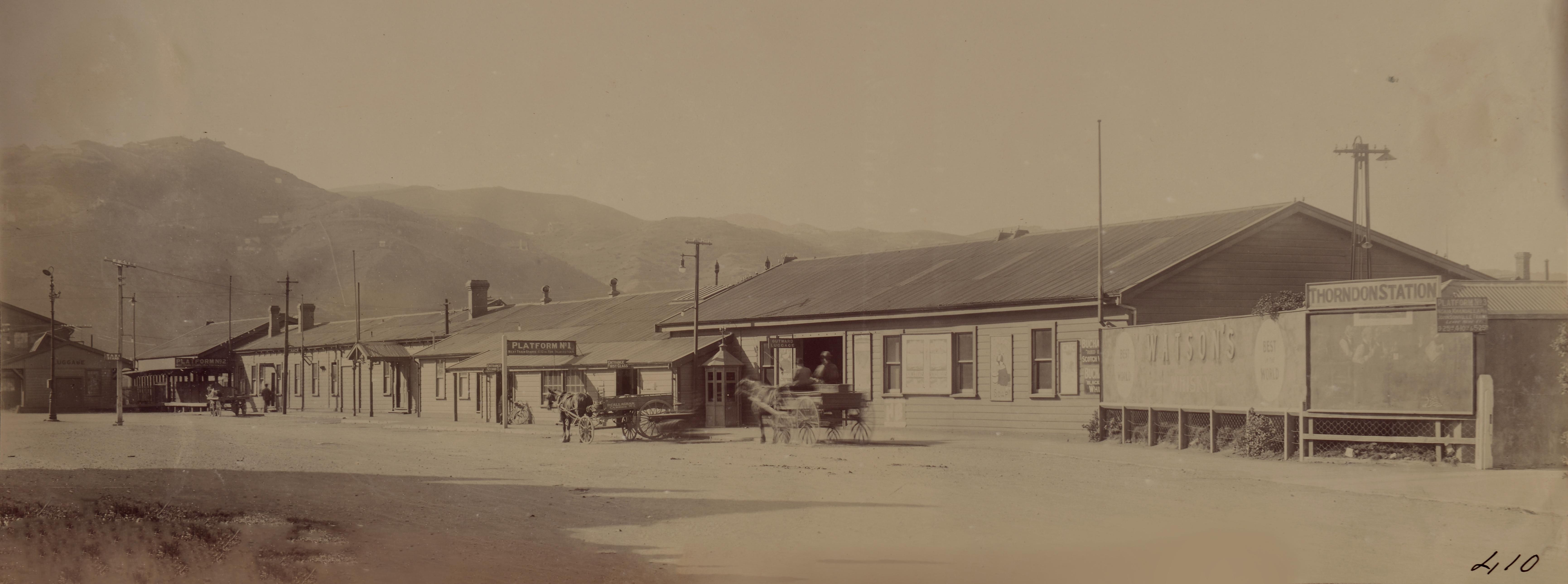
Thorndon Railway Station c.1900 opened 1886, closed 18 June 1937

The Wellington and Manawatu Railway Company (WMR or W&MR Co.) was a private railway company that operated the railway between Thorndon in Wellington, the capital of New Zealand, and Longburn, near Palmerston North in the Manawatū between 1885 and 1908. The company and its railway were acquired by the New Zealand Government Railways (NZR or NZGR) in 1908, and integrated into the NZGR system.

== History ==
The northern parts of Manawatū and Horowhenua were linked by the Foxton - Wanganui railway during the 1870s. Foxton was connected to Palmerston North in 1876 with the opening of the Foxton Branch.

The southern part of the Manawatū, including major settlements at Waikanae and Ōtaki, lacked railway communication. A military road through the Ngaio Gorge to Porirua harbour was completed in 1846 to support the Paremata barracks during the early part of the New Zealand Wars. In 1856, a horse-drawn coach service was established using this road to Porirua, from there along the beach to Paekakariki, and finally inland along a rough road to Ōtaki. A trip between Foxton and Wellington could take up to 12 hours.

A railway line between Foxton and Wellington was first mooted in 1854. By 1878, the New Zealand Government had completed some preliminary work for a railway between Wellington and the port at Foxton. Construction of a government line between Foxton and Wellington was approved in 1878. Work ceased in August 1880, although a further Wellington to Porirua Railway Bill was presented to Parliament later that month. It was voted down on 24 August, with members expressing that a line to Porirua would be "nothing more than a branch line" and therefore a waste of money.

=== 1880 – 1881: Company formation ===
On 16 September 1880, a public meeting was held at the Odd Fellows Hall in Johnsonville. At the meeting, John Plimmer proposed the formation of a private company to build and operate the line. The Wellington Chamber of Commerce supported the move, and a group of Wellington businessmen formed the Wellington and Manawatu Railway Company Limited. The company approached the central government to take over the railway works, and permission to reclaim part of Wellington harbour at Thorndon. The central government agreed to this in December 1880.

To restart construction, the company needed to raise capital. In February 1881 the company released its prospectus and issued 100,000 £5 shares, paid up to 5 shillings per share. Shareholders would be called upon to pay the remaining £4 15s. per share in 5s. increments when requested by the company. By May 1881 43,000 shares had been sold, including a substantial package to Māori landowners in the Manawatū, who exchanged land along the proposed route for shares in the company. The biggest shareholders were John Plimmer, George Shannon and William Levin, who each purchased 2,000 shares.

In May 1881, the company signed a contract with the government to purchase the land, formation and materials used for preliminary construction, which had already cost £30,000. The government made certain undertakings limiting the company's profitability and dividend payments, and made substantial grants of Crown land (210,500 acres (85,200 ha)) to prevent land speculation and make the railway a viable entity. The total land grants were valued at £96,000.00. The contract stipulated the line was to be built within five years of commencement;, and included provision for the Government to purchase the company in the future at a "fair value", something that was later to prove contentious.

On 23 August 1881, the company was registered as a limited liability company, and the Railways Construction and Land Bill was presented to parliament for its first reading. The Bill allowed joint-stock companies to build and run private railways, as long as they were built to the government's standard rail gauge of 1,067 mm (3 ft 6 in) and connected with government railway lines. The Bill was passed in September 1881, receiving Royal assent on 24 September. The Act had the effect of authorising the W&MR to proceed, and also the New Zealand Midland Railway Company.

On 22 March 1882, the company entered into a contract with the government, as required by the Act, to construct the railway within five years or forfeit any incomplete railway to the government.

=== 1882-1886: Land purchases and construction ===
Harry Higginson oversaw construction, which began in April 1882 and proceeded simultaneously from each end. Reporting to Higginson, engineer Arthur Fulton was responsible for the northern section between Longburn and Waikanae. Arthur's brother, James Fulton, was responsible for the southern section, between Wellington and Waikanae.

The government had proposed to route the line via Foxton. The company decided upon a more direct route to Palmerston North via Linton, bypassing Foxton and connecting with the NZR at Longburn. The decision was strongly debated (see from Foxton.

The company met with Te Ati Awa chief Wi Parata at Waikanae in June 1884. Parata agreed to grant WMR the right for the company to build the railway across 7 miles (11 km) of tribal land at Waikanae, but said that the owners would not subdivide their land.

In 1885, the WMR issued an additional 40,000 shares, increasing nominal share capital to £700,000. By November 1886, the company had also raised £560,000 in debentures. A total of £700,000 was spent during the construction period. While the majority of shares had been sold to New Zealand shareholders, a significant portion were sold in London, with a special board of three directors appointed to encourage sales.

In the same year, the company's first rolling stock arrived. Passenger carriages arrived from the United States in February, while the first locomotives from the United Kingdom arrived shortly after.

During this early period, the company needed to acquire land. A list of land purchases in the Tawa area includes 17 names, including 6 for which the Compensation Court decided the amount.

On 17 June 1885, an inaugural train ran from Wellington to Paremata, the completed part of the southern section.

Passenger service on the WMR commenced on the 21st of September 1885, with a regular service between Wellington and Paremata.

Construction was completed by 4 November, when the last spike was driven by His Excellency Sir James Fergusson, Governor of New Zealand. The line was formally opened at a ceremony in Palmerston North on 29 November 1886.

=== 1886 – 1908: Operations ===
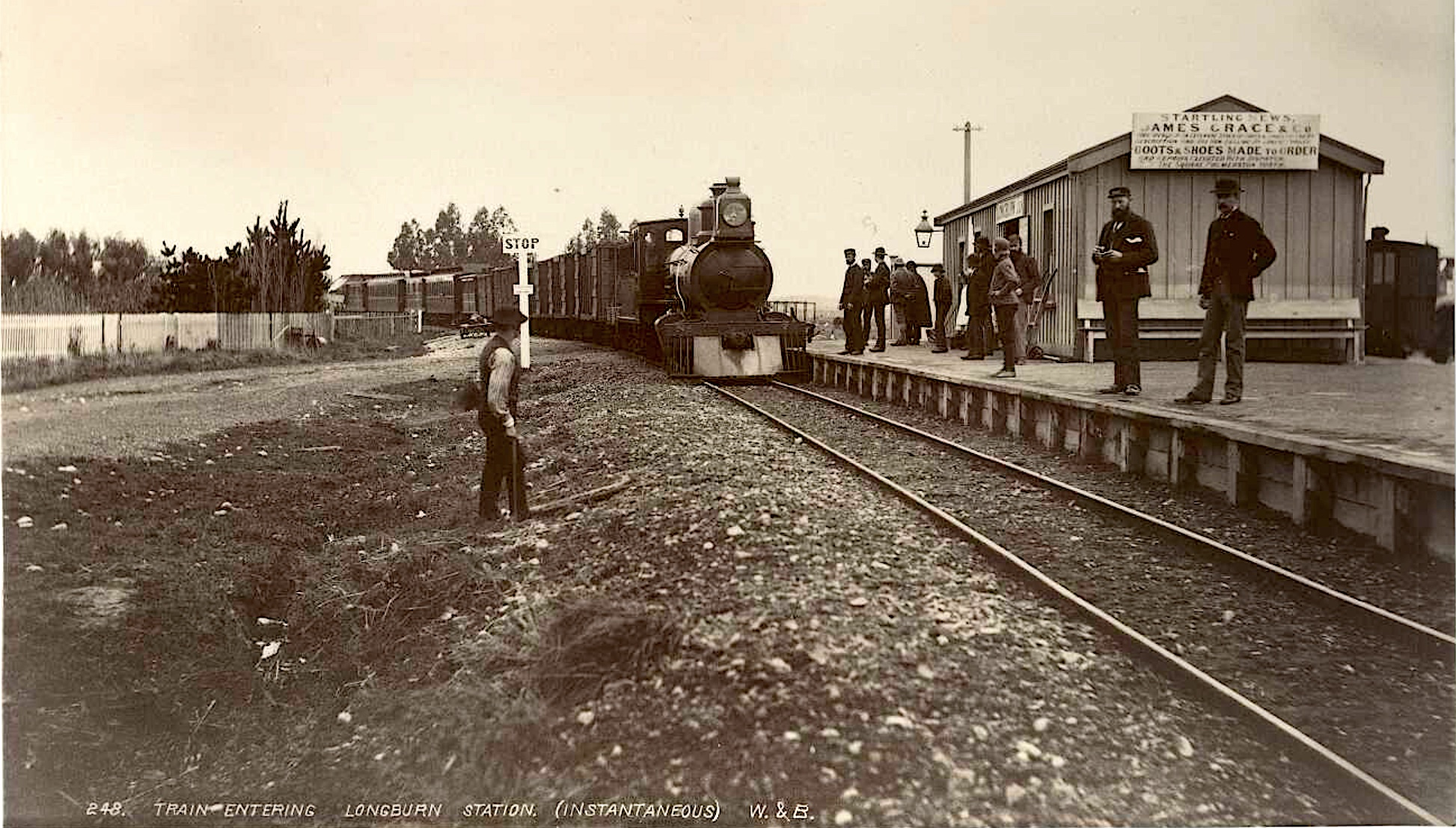
W&MR locomotive no 7 arriving with the mail train from Wellington at Longburn, c. 1888. The train to Foxton waits on the other platform.

The WMR was relatively successful and generated considerable revenue. Its land holdings proved to be a major revenue stream for the company; as sections of the lines opened, the land value around it increased and thus the WMR profited from its own operations. The new line opened up 5 million acres (2 million ha), and as the line length was 84.5 miles the company was entitled to £126,375 of land.

The government allocated £96,570 of land within a 15-mile radius from the line and agreed to allocate £29,805 more of land from land acquired in the next five years. While the company gained agreement from Māori land owners to sell the Horowhenua Block, the government did not act within five years and ignored petitions to parliament to acquire the land from Māori.

The government offered in settlement with WMR only £5,339 worth of land in 1894, knowing the company could not afford a lawsuit. The company had paid the government and local bodies £118,550, amounting to two-thirds of its paid-up capital and 20% more than the total value of the land grants. The cost of the railway and equipment to February 1905 was £1,010,197, with land grants amounting to £98,644. Since the grants were made, the value of the land had appreciated by £6,369,837, and land sales raised money to complete the railway.

The railway's operations were advanced by standards of the time, having comfortable carriages, dining cars, electric lighting, and telephone communication between stations. By comparison, the government-operated network did not introduce dining cars until 1902. From 1895 the 53 lb/yard (26 kg/metre) rails on the Wellington-Plimmerton-Paekākāriki section were replaced with 65 lb/yard (32 kg/metre) rails. In 1900–02 the rolling stock was fitted with Westinghouse air brakes.

=== 1908: Acquisition ===
The WMR was bought by the government in 1908 (as soon as it could be purchased without penalty), and was integrated into the New Zealand Government Railways from Monday 7 December 1908. The staff, 123 in 1886–87, grew to 382 by 1908, of whom 324 transferred to the NZR. The NZR also took over 20 locomotives, 56 bogie passenger cars, 14 brake vans, 343 wagons and two 10-ton hand cranes.

The company had paid a 6% or 7% annual dividend, a return averaging 13½% per year, and when the company was taken over shareholders received 55 to 60 shillings a share. Of the 633 shareholders on the Wellington register, 307 were "originals".

== Railway line ==
The company's line ran for about 81 miles (130 km). From the Thorndon terminus, it wound up through the hills to Johnsonville. This section is presently^{2026} known as the Johnsonville Branch. It then proceeded to Tawa along the approximate route of the present day^{2026} State Highway 1 motorway. From Tawa to Longburn the North Island Main Trunk generally follows its route, through Porirua, Paekākāriki, Paraparaumu, Ōtaki, and Shannon.

A number of new towns were established along the route, notably Plimmerton, named after company director and "Father of Wellington" John Plimmer. Levin, named after William Hort Levin, and Shannon, named after George Vance Shannon (1842–1920), were also named after directors of the company.

The WMR built simple, unprepossessing stations, stating in 1893 that it "...does not build stations for future generations of travellers as our Government seems to – but adapts expenditure to actual requirements leaving additions to be made as wanted."

Wellington (Thorndon) and Longburn station buildings were provisional, as the government procrastinated in building joint stations. It was suggested that WMR trains could run to Palmerston North over the NZR line, at a cost. WMR passenger trains eventually ran to Palmerston North Central railway station.)

Other stations were based on PWD designs for 4th, 5th and 6th class stations. They all had a central waiting area open at the front with seating along the rear and one side, and a simple sloped roof dropping to the rear but no verandah. The 4th and 5th class stations had an office with ticket slide at one end and a ladies’ waiting room at the other end, while the 6th class or Flag stations only had an office:

- Fourth Class (42 ft x 14 ft): Johnsonville, Paremata, Ōtaki, Shannon.
- Fifth Class (34 ft 8 in x 14 ft 9 in): Crofton, Khandallah, Porirua, Plimmerton, Paekākāriki.
- Sixth Class (Flag) (about 15 ft x 8 ft): Tawa Flat, Plimmerton, Pukerua, Paraparaumu, Waikanae, Te Horo, Hadfield, Manukau, Ohau, Levin (original), Kereru, Makerua, Tokomaru, Linton.

== Motive power ==
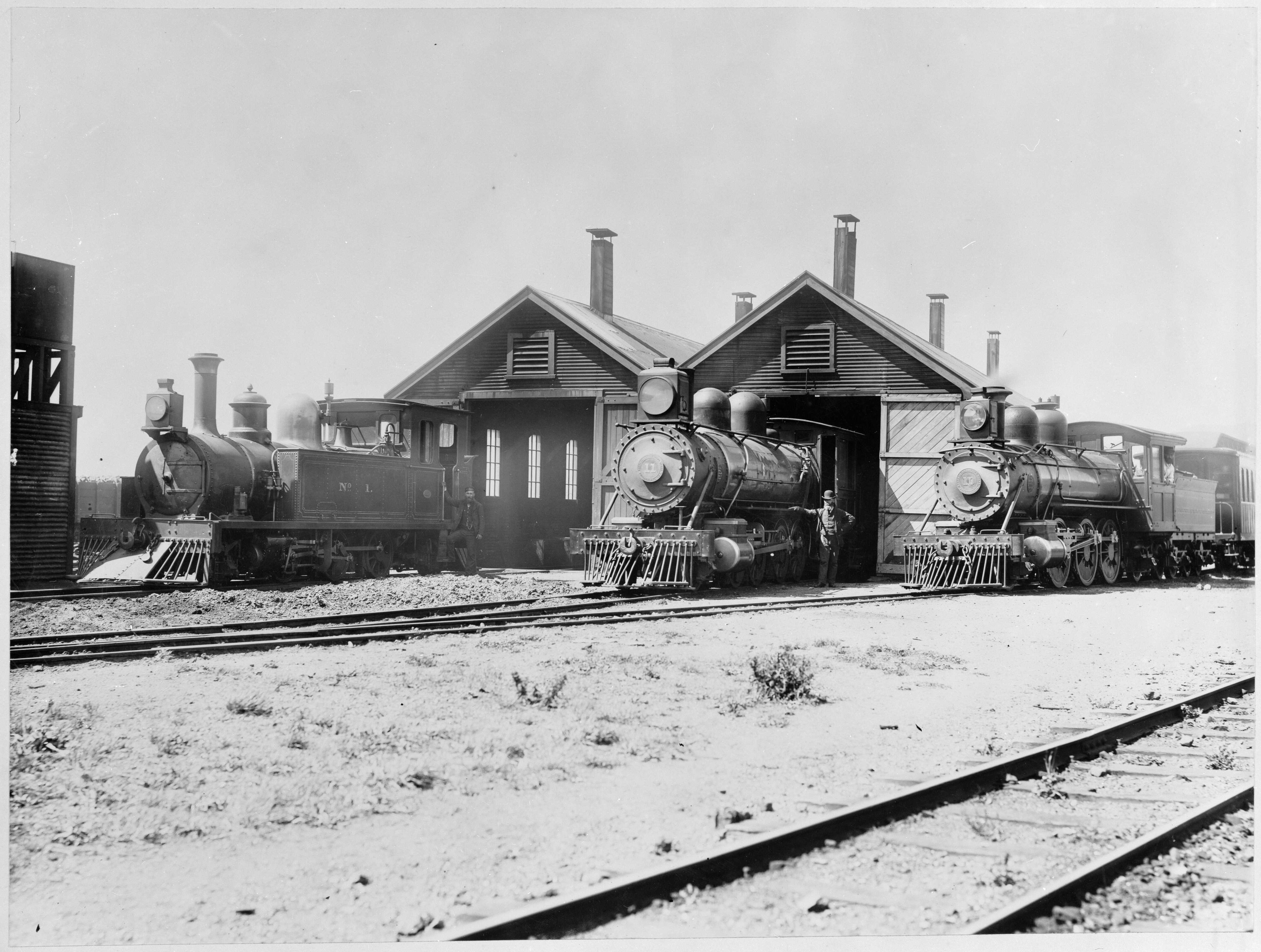
Three WMR locomotives at Thorndon.

The WMR operated 22 locomotives in revenue service, of which 20 were acquired by NZR in 1908 (the original Nos. 3 & 5 were sold to the Timaru Harbour Board).

The WMR classified its locomotives by number without class distinction; if a locomotive was withdrawn its number was re-used on a new locomotive. When the WMR was acquired by the government, some locomotives joined existing classes (N and V), while others had new class designations established for them. These classes contained few locomotives, so all were withdrawn by 1931 during the 1925–35 standardisation programme.

Seven engines were Vauclain compounds from Baldwin. WMR No. 13, built in 1894, was the first compound in New Zealand and the first narrow-gauge compound in the world.

W&MR numbers	Introduced	Wheel configuration	Builder	NZR class	Notes
Nos. 1, 2, 3, 4, 5	1884	2-6-2T	Manning Wardle & Co., England	W^{H} class	Nos. 3 and 5 sold to Timaru Harbour Board, 1900 and 1901.
No. 3	1904	2-8-4T	Baldwin Locomotive Works, United States	W^{J} class	Nicknamed "Jumbo".
No. 5	1901	2-6-2	Baldwin Locomotive Works, United States	N^{C} class (compound)	
Nos. 6, 7, 8	1885	2-6-2	Nasmyth Wilson & Co., England.	V class	
Nos. 9, 10	1891	2-6-2	Baldwin Locomotive Works, United States	N class	No 9 under restoration at Steam Incorporated see below
Nos. 11, 12	1888	2-8-0	Baldwin Locomotive Works, United States	O^{B} class	
No. 13	1893	2-8-0	Baldwin Locomotive Works, United States	O^{A} class (compound)	In 1896 accident, nicknamed "The Lady".
No. 14	1894	2-6-2	Baldwin Locomotive Works, United States	N^{A} class (compound)	
No. 15	1896	2-6-2	Baldwin Locomotive Works, United States	N^{A} class (compound)	
No. 16	1896	2-8-0	Baldwin Locomotive Works, United States	O^{C} class (compound)	
No. 17	1901	2-8-2	Baldwin Locomotive Works, United States	B^{C} class (compound)	
No. 18	1904	2-6-2	Baldwin Locomotive Works, United States	N^{C} class (compound)	
Nos. 19, 20	1904	4-6-0	Baldwin Locomotive Works, United States	U^{D} class	

No. 10 became particularly famous when, on 20 July 1892, it achieved 64.4 mph (103.6 km/h) hauling a test train along the level stretch of line between Levin and Shannon, at the time the world speed record for the 1,067 mm (3 ft 6 in) gauge. The locomotive was withdrawn in 1928 and dumped in the Waimakariri River to help stabilise the riverbank, and its final resting place is a mystery.

No. 3 or Jumbo (W^{J} class) banked north out of Wellington for 25 years (to 1927) on the long and steep 1 in 40 grades up to Crofton (Ngaio) and Khandallah. Other steep grades going north were 1 in 66 between Plimmerton and Pukerua Bay; and going south 1 in 66 from Paekākāriki to Pukerua Bay (the North–South Junction) and up to 1 in 54 from Tawa Flat (Tawa) to Johnsonville.

The WMR owned other locomotives for construction and maintenance. These included a New Zealand Railways Department P class of 1876. Known as Weka, it was used by the WMR from 1882 until 1898, when it was sold to the Manawatu County Council for use on its Sanson Tramway.

== Surviving relics ==
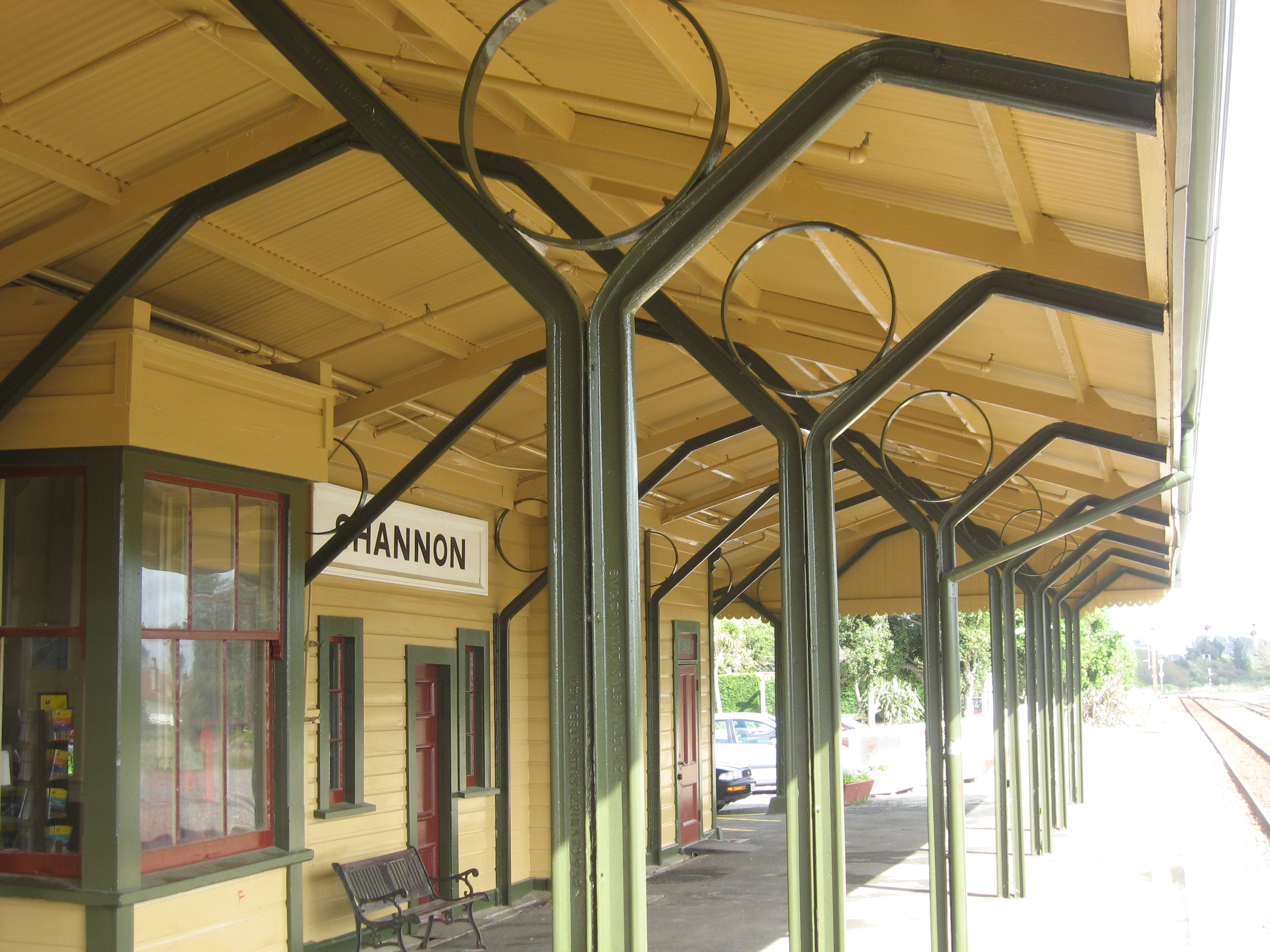
Shannon Railway Station

Despite the WMR's short history and its disappearance long before the railway preservation movement began, a number of relics have survived. Of the locomotives, only No. 9 (later NZR N 453) is known to exist, the remains of which were recovered in 2003 by the Wellington and Manawatu Railway Trust. It is under active restoration at Steam Incorporated, Paekākāriki. Sister locomotive No. 10 is believed to have been dumped complete along the Midland Line, but has yet to be discovered. Railway archaeologist Tony Batchelor believes he may have found No. 7 (later NZR V 451) in Southland, but this has yet to be proven.

A number of items of rolling stock survive, including three passenger carriages – 50 ft cars No. 42 (NZR A 1120), No. 48 (NZR A 1126) and No. 52 (NZR A 1130), are owned by the New Zealand Railway and Locomotive Society and stored in their shed at the north end of the Silver Stream Railway site. No. 48 is nearing completion of its restoration. No. 52 is currently being disassembled in preparation for a thorough rebuild. Most of a forth carriage 43 ft car No. 35 (NZR A 1113), existed until recently in Auckland, but has since been demolished. No bogie wagons are thought to exist, although Motat hold both a van bogie and a freight bogie in their collection. Seven 4-wheel wagons survive, most believed to be former L wagons – one owned by the Wellington and Manawatu Railway Trust, one at the Ferrymead Railway, one in a private collection in Masterton and three owned by SteamRail Wanganui, in poor condition.

The bell at the concourse end of Wellington railway station's platform 6 is believed to be from either WMR locomotive no. 17 or WMR locomotive no. 5.

Infrastructure remains include the Johnsonville Line, a stone plaque on the eastern abutment of the bridge across Hutt Rd in Wellington, the foundations of the Belmont Viaduct near Johnsonville, most of the NIMT north of Tawa, the railway station at Shannon, the former Te Horo station (now at the Tokomaru Steam Museum) and the Forest Lakes rail bridge. A memorial at Otaihanga on the NIMT commemorates the driving of the WMR's last spike.

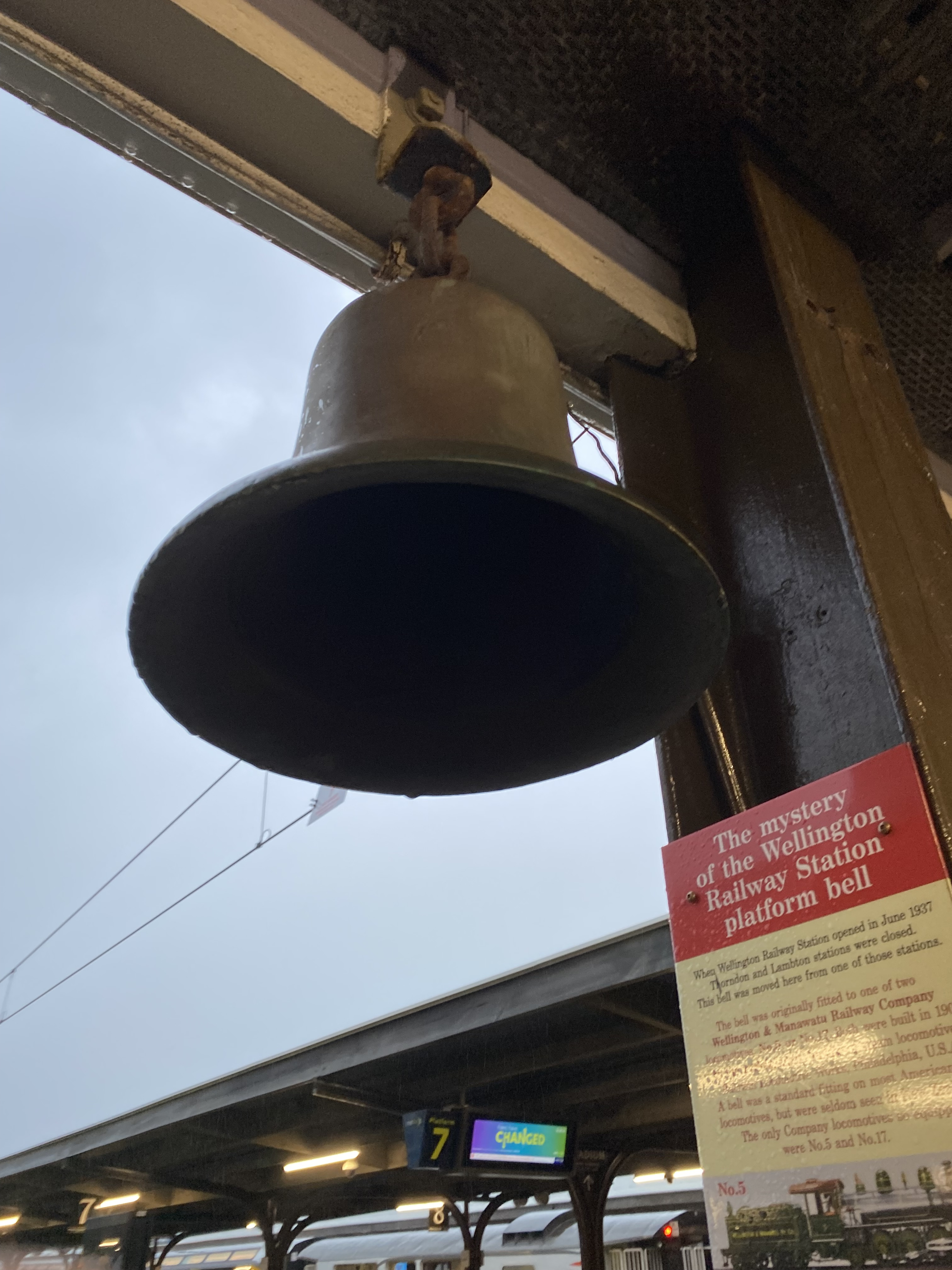
The bell on platform 6 of Wellington Train Station.

== See also ==
- Harry Higginson (engineer)
- Arthur Fulton (engineer)
- James Edward Fulton (engineer)
- James Marchbanks, (engineer, Locomotive Superintendent)
- William Hannay, General Manager
- Will Lawson (fireman-poet, pre-WWI)
- Wellington-Manawatu Line
- 50-foot carriages of WMR
