= NZR NA class =

NZR N^{A} class
Type and origin
- Power type: Steam
- Builder: Baldwin Locomotive Works
- Serial number: 13913, 15054
- Build date: 1894, 1896
- Total produced: 2
Specifications
- Configuration
  - Whyte: 2-6-2
  - UIC: 1′C1′ n
- Gauge: 3 ft 6 in (1,067 mm)
- Driver dia.: 49 in (1.245 m)
- Length: 50 ft 10 in (15.49 m)
- Adhesive weight: 25 long tons 4 cwt (56,400 lb or 25.6 t); 25 long tons 4 hundredweight (25.6 t; 28.2 short tons)
- Loco weight: 35 long tons 4 cwt (78,800 lb or 35.8 t); 35 long tons 4 hundredweight (35.8 t; 39.4 short tons)
- Tender weight: 19 long tons 2 cwt (42,800 lb or 19.4 t); 19 long tons 2 hundredweight (19.4 t; 21.4 short tons)
- Total weight: 54 long tons 10 cwt (122,100 lb or 55.4 t); 54 long tons 10 hundredweight (55.4 t; 61.0 short tons)
- Fuel type: Coal
- Fuel capacity: 3 long tons 0 cwt (6,700 lb or 3 t); 6 long tons 0 hundredweight (6.1 t; 6.7 short tons)
- Water cap.: 1,500 imp gal (6,800 L; 1,800 US gal)
- Firebox
  - Grate area: 16.7 sq ft (1.55 m^{2})
- Boiler pressure: 180 lbf/in^{2} (1,241 kPa)
- Heating surface: 957 sq ft (88.9 m^{2})
- Superheater: None
- Cylinders: Four (Vauclain compound)
- High-pressure cylinder: 10 in × 20 in (254 mm × 508 mm)
- Low-pressure cylinder: 17 in × 20 in (432 mm × 508 mm)
Performance figures
- Tractive effort: 9,700 lbf (43.15 kN)
Career
- Operators: Wellington and Manawatu Railway, New Zealand Government Railways
- Numbers: WMR 14, 15; NZR 459, 460
- Locale: Frankton, Wairarapa, Wellington - Longburn section
- Withdrawn: 1929
- Disposition: Withdrawn

The NZR N^{A} class was a class of two steam locomotives that operated on the privately owned Wellington and Manawatu Railway (WMR) and then the publicly owned New Zealand Railways (NZR).

== Introduction ==
Ordered by the WMR to operate on its line up the west coast of the North Island north of Wellington, the first was built in 1894 by the Baldwin Locomotive Works and entered service that year as WMR No. 14. In 1896, a second locomotive that was slightly more powerful was ordered from Baldwin, and it entered service in October 1897. The engines were similar to the two members of the N class ordered in 1891, except they were heavier and more powerful. They were Vauclain compound locomotives.

In 1908, the WMR was incorporated into the national network and the government's Railways Department reclassified the engines as the sole members of the N^{A} class: No. 14 became N^{A} 459 and No. 15 became N^{A} 460. They operated for roughly another two decades.

== Withdrawal ==
N^{A} 459 spent its final days working in Frankton near Hamilton and was withdrawn from service in March 1929, while N^{A} 460's last depot was Cross Creek at the Wairarapa end of the Rimutaka Incline and it was withdrawn in July 1929.
