= James Fulton (engineer) =

New Zealand surveyor and civil engineer (1854–1928)

James Edward Fulton (11 December 1854 – 6 December 1928) was a New Zealand surveyor and civil engineer. He was born in Outram, South Otago, New Zealand on 11 December 1854, and was the son of James and Catherine Valpy Fulton. He and his wife had a daughter (born 19 June 1887).

== Career ==
He worked for a short time as an engineer in flax mill, before becoming a Public Works Department cadet. In 1875 he went to Napier and in 1878 was promoted to Assistant Engineer. He left PWD in 1880 and worked on the Kaihu railway.

He became Resident Engineer of the Longburn-Waikanae section for the Wellington and Manawatu Railway Company from 1882 under Harry Higginson (with his brother Arthur Fulton), and the WMR manager and locomotive superintendent from 1889. He resigned in 1897 after accepting responsibility for an incident when his unofficial special train to Plimmerton with an engine and a carriage for his family met a freight train head on; trains were not normally scheduled on a Sunday! He was the driver with another company official as fireman.

In 1897 he re-entered private practice and worked on the Wellington Cable Car, the original Kelburn Viaduct at Tinakori Gully, Ballance Bridge in the Manawatū Gorge, Ōtaki, Ōhau, Rangitīkei and Lower Shotover (on the Queenstown Trail) bridges. In 1906 he visited the US and Europe to study new engineering techniques, then built Cambridge High Level Bridge, Victoria Bridge, Hamilton and Taupo-Totara Timber Co tramway. He is commemorated as an ex-President of IPENZ by the Fulton-Downer Gold Medal.

== Personal life ==
James had a wife and daughter. He retired in 1926, and died in Wellington in 1928 aged 73 years. He is buried in Karori Cemetery.
