= Arthur Fulton (engineer) =

New Zealand engineer

Arthur Robert William Fulton (3 October 1853 – 26 July 1889) a New Zealand engineer was the eldest son of James Fulton and his wife Catherine. Like his brother James, Arthur was a Public Works Department cadet (under Blair) and then an assistant engineer in Westport. He was then asked to join Harry Higginson's practice, where he stayed until 1881, when he went to New South Wales to survey the Goulburn-Cowra section of the Main Southern railway line.

When Higginson was made chief engineer for construction of the Wellington–Manawatu Railway in 1882, he obtained the services of Arthur and James as Resident Engineers for the construction of the Wellington-Waikanae and Waikanae–Longburn sections respectively.

When the line was completed in 1886 he was appointed traffic manager and locomotive superintendent, then became managing engineer. In 1885 he had introduced an improved method of signalling drivers and guards on the trains. He was also responsible for the introduction of American locomotives on the line (from 1888).

In 1883 Arthur married Linda Marie Weber. In 1889, at the age of 35, Arthur died of typhoid fever in Wellington during an outbreak of the disease, leaving a widow and three young sons. Wellington sewerage was then collected in open drains (see Katherine Mansfield House; this prompted Harold Beauchamp's move to Karori).

Fulton was buried in the Bolton Street Cemetery.
