= Harry Higginson =

British civil engineer (1838–1900)

Harry Pasley Higginson (1838–1900) was a British and New Zealand civil engineer who was notable for constructing the Wellington and Manawatu Railway Company (WMR) line from Wellington to the Manawatu in the 1880s. The WMR was a private company, as the government had decided not to build the line. Higginson also played an important role in the discovery of Dodo bones on the island of Mauritius in 1865.

Higginson was born in Thormanby, North Yorkshire, England in 1838 and educated at the Collegiate School, Leicester.

== Engineering career ==
He was apprenticed to Sir William Fairbairn in Manchester for five years, then constructed railways, canals and water works in Russia in 1860–61, in Mauritius from 1862 until 1866, and in England and in India. He became an associate member of the Institute of Civil Engineers while in India in 1868, and a full member in 1871.

In 1872 Higginson was appointed as superintending engineer for railways and public works in the South Island. In 1878 he left government service and set up in private practice in Dunedin. His work on the Kawarau Gorge Suspension Bridge earned him the Telford Premium of the (British) Institute of Civil Engineers.

In 1882 he was contracted as chief engineer to complete the Wellington to Manawatu Railway within five years of 25 September 1862, the government having already completed some works to Johnsonville. He appointed as his assistants the Dunedin brothers Arthur and James Fulton. The line was completed on 27 October 1886, with the first through train on 3 November. The completion was nine months early; Higginson got his promised bonus four years later.

Higginson's last appointment was as engineer-manager of the Wellington Gas Works.

== Discovery of Dodo bones ==
In 1865, whilst working for the Government Staff of the Mauritius Railways, Higginson came upon some workers extracting bones from a swampy morass known as the Mare aux Songes. He records the moment in his ‘Reminiscences of Life and Travel’

Shortly before the completion of the railway I was walking along the embankment one morning, when I noticed some [workers] removing some peat soil from a small morass. They were separating and placing into heaps, a number of bones, of various sorts, among the debris. I stopped and examined them, as they appeared to belong to birds and reptiles, and we had always been on the lookout for bones of the then mythical Dodo. So I filled my pocket with the most promising ones for further examination.

A Mr Clarke [sic], the Government schoolmaster in Mahebourg, had Professor Owens’ [sic] book on the Dodo, so I took the bones to him, for comparison with the book plates. The result showed that many of the bones undoubtedly belonged to the Dodo. This was so important a discovery that Clarke [sic] obtained leave to go out to the Morass, and personally superintend the search for more. He eventually dispatched a large quantity to the British Museum, which sold for several hundred pounds.

I sent a box full to the Liverpool, York, and Leeds Museums, from which, in the former, a complete skeleton was erected. This is the only spot in the world where these bones have been found; and all that are now to be seen in various collections, came out of the same bog, only 200 feet in diameter.

The Dodo bones are still held by World Museum Liverpool, The Yorkshire Museum and Leeds Museums and Galleries.

== Personal life ==
He died in Wellington on 26 February 1900 aged 63, and was buried in the Karori Cemetery. He is commemorated in a stained glass window at the Wellington Cathedral of St. Paul. The window is decorated with an image of the Kawarau Gorge Suspension Bridge and a Dodo.
