= Paremata railway station =

Railway station in New Zealand

Paremata
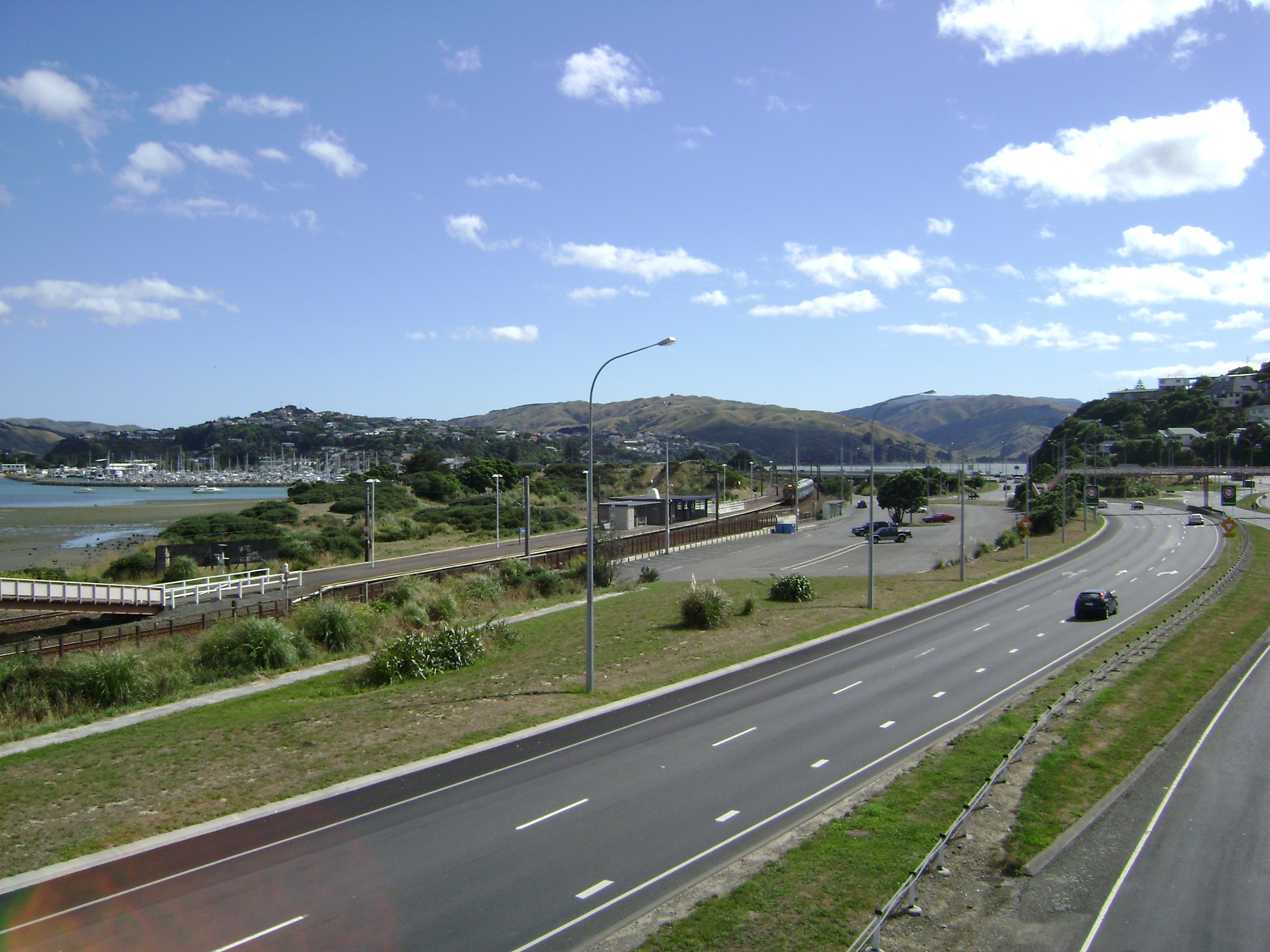
- Paremata station as seen from the southern pedestrian footbridge, 19 January 2008. An EM/ET class electric multiple unit can be seen arriving with a service bound for Wellington.

General information
- Location: State Highway 59, Paremata, Porirua, New Zealand
- Coordinates: 41°06′22.75″S 174°51′58.75″E
- System: Metlink suburban rail
- Owner: Greater Wellington Regional Council
- Line: North Island Main Trunk
- Platforms: Island Platform
- Tracks: Mainline (2)

Construction
- Structure type: Shelter
- Parking: Yes
- Cycle facilities: Yes

History
- Opened: 21 September 1885
- Rebuilt: 1960
- Electrified: 24 July 1940

Services
Preceding station	Transdev Wellington	Following station
Mana towards Waikanae	Kāpiti Line	Porirua towards Wellington
Location

Paremata railway station on the Kāpiti Line section of the North Island Main Trunk Railway (NIMT) in Paremata in the city of Porirua, New Zealand, is part of the Wellington Region's Metlink suburban rail network.

It is double tracked with an island platform. It has subway access to a Park and Ride to the south-east, which includes a bus stop and an overbridge across State Highway 59 to Paremata's southern commercial centre, Paremata School, and the nearby residential areas. From the south end of the station, another pedestrian overbridge leads across the state highway to the western end of Paremata Crescent, giving access to the adjoining Papakowhai suburb.

== Services ==
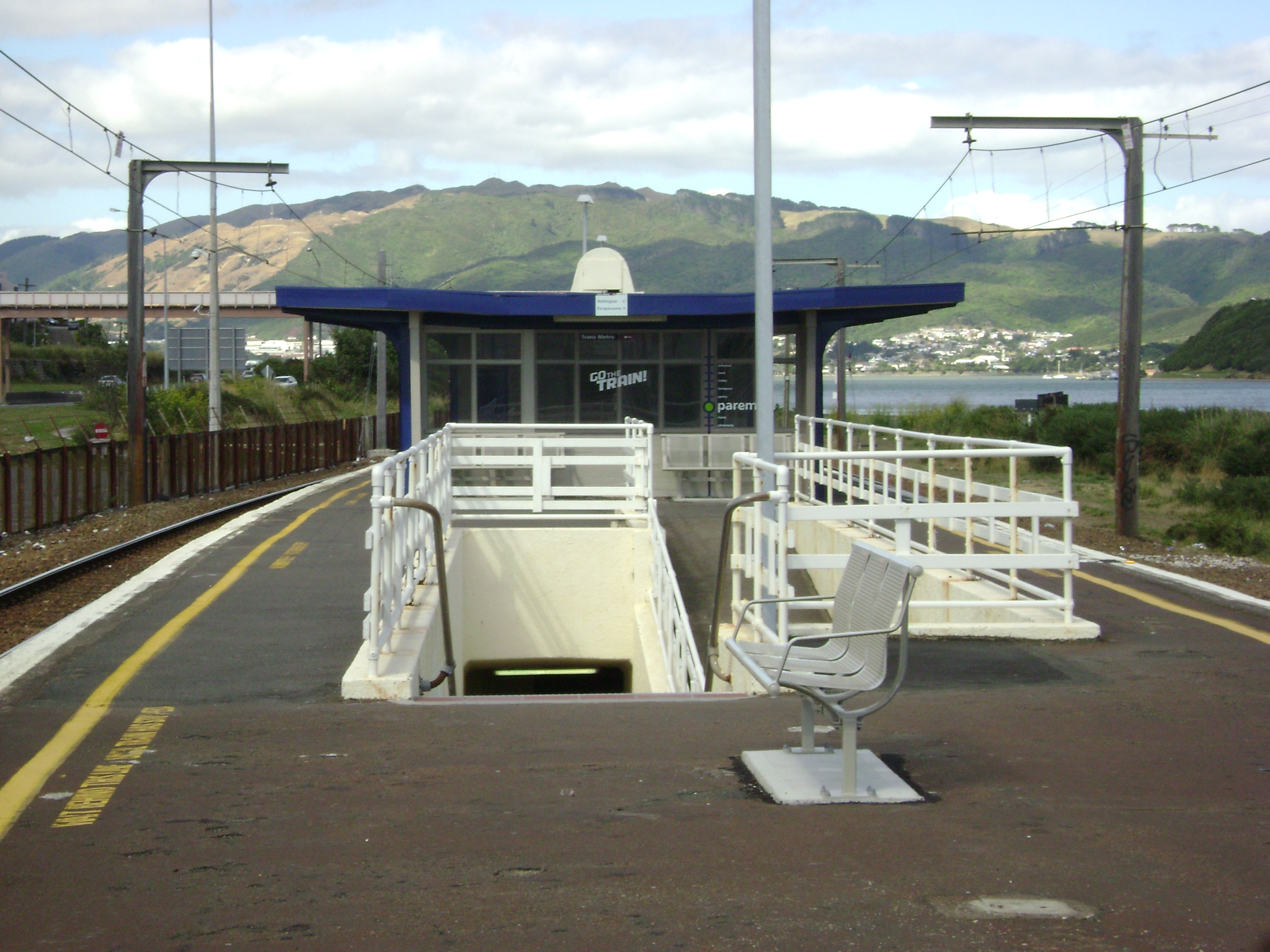
Entrance to the pedestrian underpass

Paremata is the first station north of Porirua on the Kāpiti Line for commuter trains operated by Transdev Wellington under the Metlink brand under contract with the Greater Wellington Regional Council. Services between Wellington and Porirua or Waikanae are operated by electric multiple units of the FT/FP class (Matangi). Two diesel-hauled carriage trains, the Capital Connection and the Northern Explorer, pass through the station but do not stop.

All suburban services running between Wellington and Plimmerton or Waikanae stop at Paremata. Off-peak trains stop at all stations between Wellington and Waikanae. During peak periods, some trains from Wellington that stop at all stations may terminate at Porirua and return to Wellington while a number of peak services run express or non-stop between Wellington and Porirua before stopping at all stations from Porirua to Waikanae. Plimmerton is the northern terminus for some peak period trains which terminate at Plimmerton and return to Wellington.

Travel times by train are approximately thirty-five minutes to Waikanae, four minutes to Porirua, twenty-five minutes to Wellington for trains stopping at all stations, and twenty-one minutes for express trains that do not stop between Porirua and Wellington.

Trains run every twenty minutes during daytime off-peak hours, more frequently during peak periods, and less frequently at night. Before July 2018, off-peak passenger train services between Wellington and Waikanae ran every thirty minutes but were increased to one every twenty minutes from 15 July 2018.

KiwiRail Scenic long-distance trains and diesel hauled KiwiRail freight trains pass by the station but do not stop.

== History ==
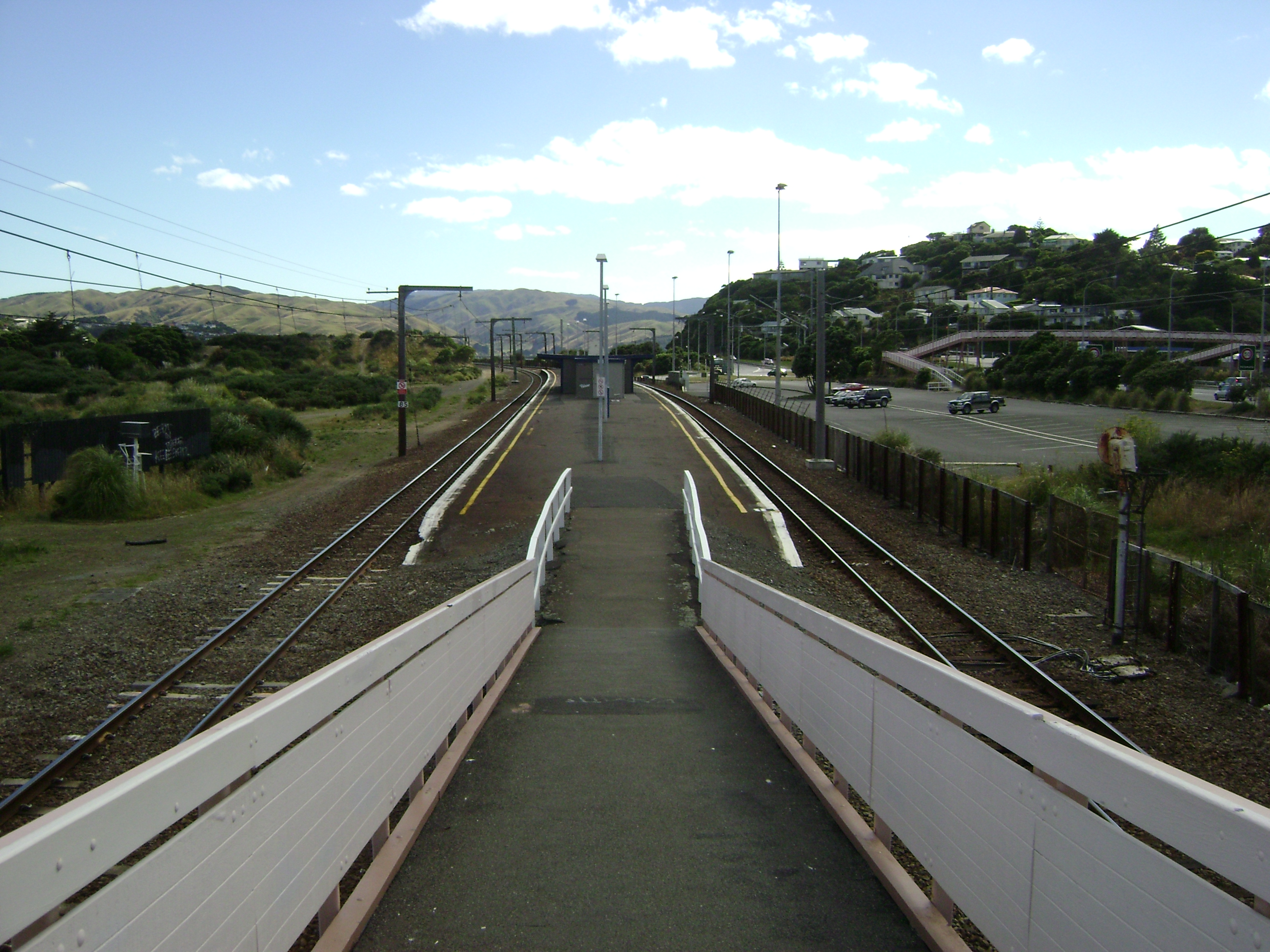
The southern end of Paremata railway station

The line was originally part of the Wellington - Manawatu Line built by the Wellington and Manawatu Railway Company (WMR). The line to Paremata station, which was close to the Paremata Barracks ruins, was opened on 21 September 1885, without ceremony. The first train with 59 people aboard had three composite coaches and a van. Cobb & Co built stables at Paremata, and from October 1885 an early train leaving town at 7 a.m. made it possible to travel from Wellington to Wanganui in one day by rail and coach. The line was extended to Plimmerton in October, and Pukerua Bay by the end of the year. The line was extended to Paekakariki in 1886, and was electrified (with locomotive-hauled carriage trains) in 1940 after the opening of the Tawa Flat deviation.

Reclamation carried out to straighten the line between Porirua and Paremata required heavy earth-moving machinery to cross the line frequently, and the drivers of departing trains at both stations were reminded by a warning yellow over red departure signal at both stations. To allow two suburban trains to cross at Paremata a second western loop was installed on the seaward side of the platform in 1958, as both EMUs had high floors and exits; consequently only the platform road could be used. The down home signal then gave a medium-speed indication for both the established eastern loop and the new platformed western loop, with a low-speed indication for the main, east loop and sidings. The up home signal functioned in a similar manner.

Double tracking north to Mana was opened on 7 November 1960, and the original station built in 1885 by the WMR was replaced by a new one across on south side of the Pauatahanui Inlet entrance. The original station yard had a large freight shed built in World War II for the American forces in the district, but postwar there was little freight traffic, and the yard was not replaced. The new station on reclamation for the new bridge embankment was nearly ten feet higher than the old yard.
