= Otaihanga =

Settlement in Wellington Region, New Zealand

- Town
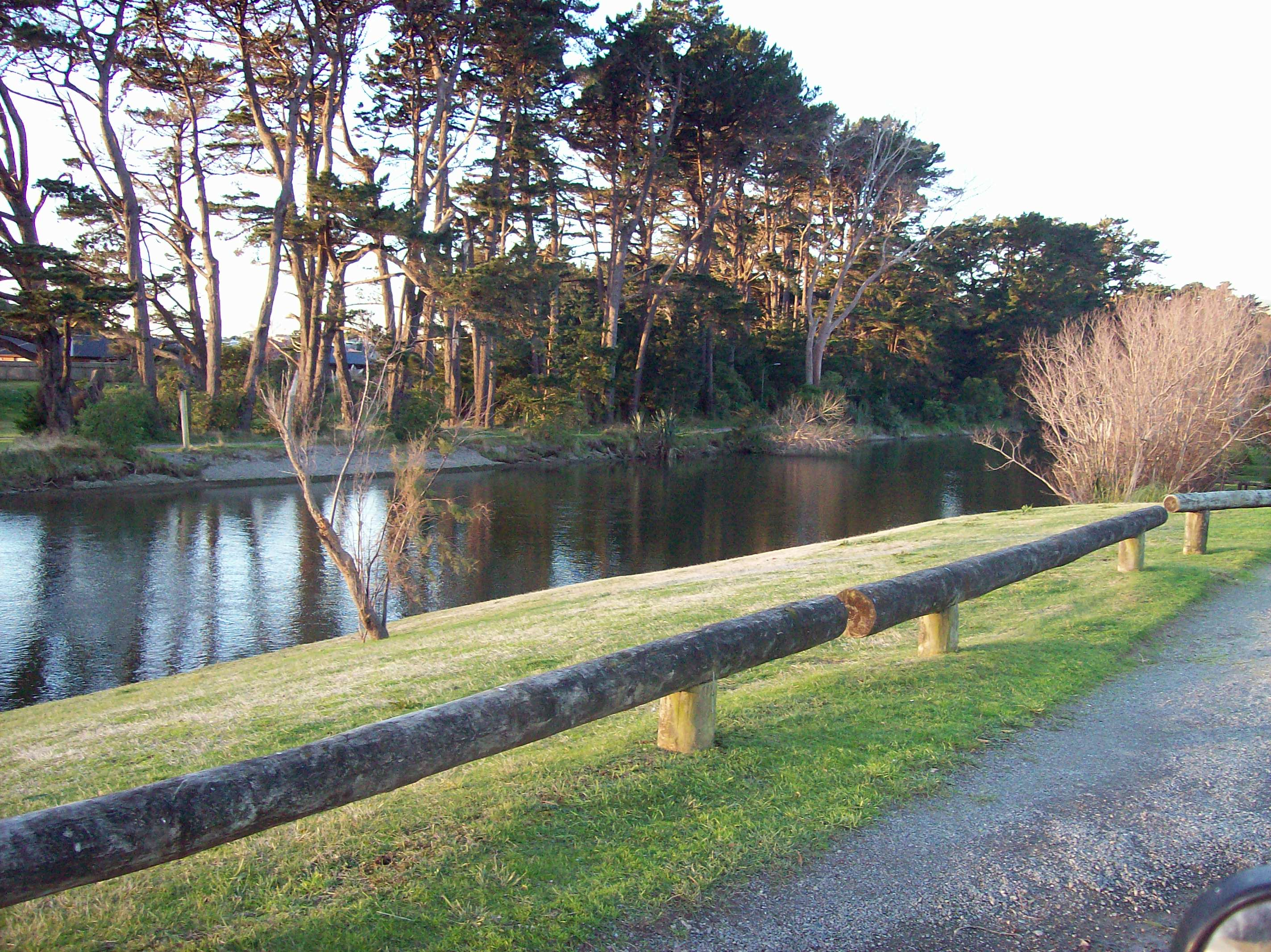
- The Waikanae River as viewed from its southern bank in Otaihanga. Across the river is the town of Waikanae Beach.
- Interactive map of Otaihanga
- Coordinates: 40°52′53″S 175°00′49″E
- Country: New Zealand
- Region: Wellington Region
- Territorial authority: Kāpiti Coast District
- Ward: Paraparaumu Ward
- Community: Paraparaumu Community
- Electorates: Kapiti; Te Tai Hauāuru (Māori)

Government
  - Territorial Authority: Kāpiti Coast District Council
  - Regional council: Greater Wellington Regional Council
  - Kāpiti Coast Mayor: Janet Holborow
  - Kapiti MP: Tim Costley
  - Te Tai Hauāuru MP: Debbie Ngarewa-Packer

Area
  - Total: 4.16 km^{2} (1.61 sq mi)

Population (June 2025)
  - Total: 920
  - Density: 220/km^{2} (570/sq mi)
- Postcode(s): 5036
- Area code: 04

Otaihanga is on the Kāpiti Coast of New Zealand's North Island. It is just north of Paraparaumu on the south bank of the Waikanae River and is roughly 55 km north of New Zealand's capital city, Wellington. Its name is Māori for "the place made by the tide".

The New Zealand Ministry for Culture and Heritage gives a translation of "place of Taihanga [a personal name]" for Ōtaihanga.

== Demographics ==
Otaihanga statistical area covers 4.16 km^{2} (1.61 sq mi). It had an estimated population of 920 as of June 2025, with a population density of 221.15 people per km^{2}.

Historical population
Year	Pop.	±% p.a.
2006	750	—
2013	735	−0.29%
2018	798	+1.66%
2023	855	+1.39%
The 2006 population is for a larger area of 4.47 km^{2}. Source:

Otaihanga had a population of 855 in the 2023 New Zealand census, an increase of 57 people (7.1%) since the 2018 census, and an increase of 120 people (16.3%) since the 2013 census. There were 417 males, 432 females, and 9 people of other genders in 309 dwellings. 3.9% of people identified as LGBTIQ+. The median age was 44.9 years (compared with 38.1 years nationally). There were 150 people (17.5%) aged under 15 years, 144 (16.8%) aged 15 to 29, 414 (48.4%) aged 30 to 64, and 144 (16.8%) aged 65 or older.

People could identify as more than one ethnicity. The results were 93.3% European (Pākehā); 18.9% Māori; 3.5% Pasifika; 3.2% Asian; 0.4% Middle Eastern, Latin American and African New Zealanders (MELAA); and 4.2% other, which includes people giving their ethnicity as "New Zealander". English was spoken by 97.5%, Māori by 3.2%, Samoan by 0.4%, and other languages by 8.4%. No language could be spoken by 2.5% (e.g. too young to talk). New Zealand Sign Language was known by 0.4%. The percentage of people born overseas was 20.4, compared with 28.8% nationally.

Religious affiliations were 22.1% Christian, 0.4% Māori religious beliefs, 0.4% New Age, and 1.8% other religions. People who answered that they had no religion were 70.2%, and 5.6% of people did not answer the census question.

Of those at least 15 years old, 174 (24.7%) people had a bachelor's or higher degree, 405 (57.4%) had a post-high school certificate or diploma, and 123 (17.4%) people exclusively held high school qualifications. The median income was $44,700, compared with $41,500 nationally. 126 people (17.9%) earned over $100,000 compared to 12.1% nationally. The employment status of those at least 15 was 372 (52.8%) full-time, 114 (16.2%) part-time, and 12 (1.7%) unemployed.

The demographics for Otaihanga are also incorporated in Paraparaumu#Demographics.

== Attractions ==
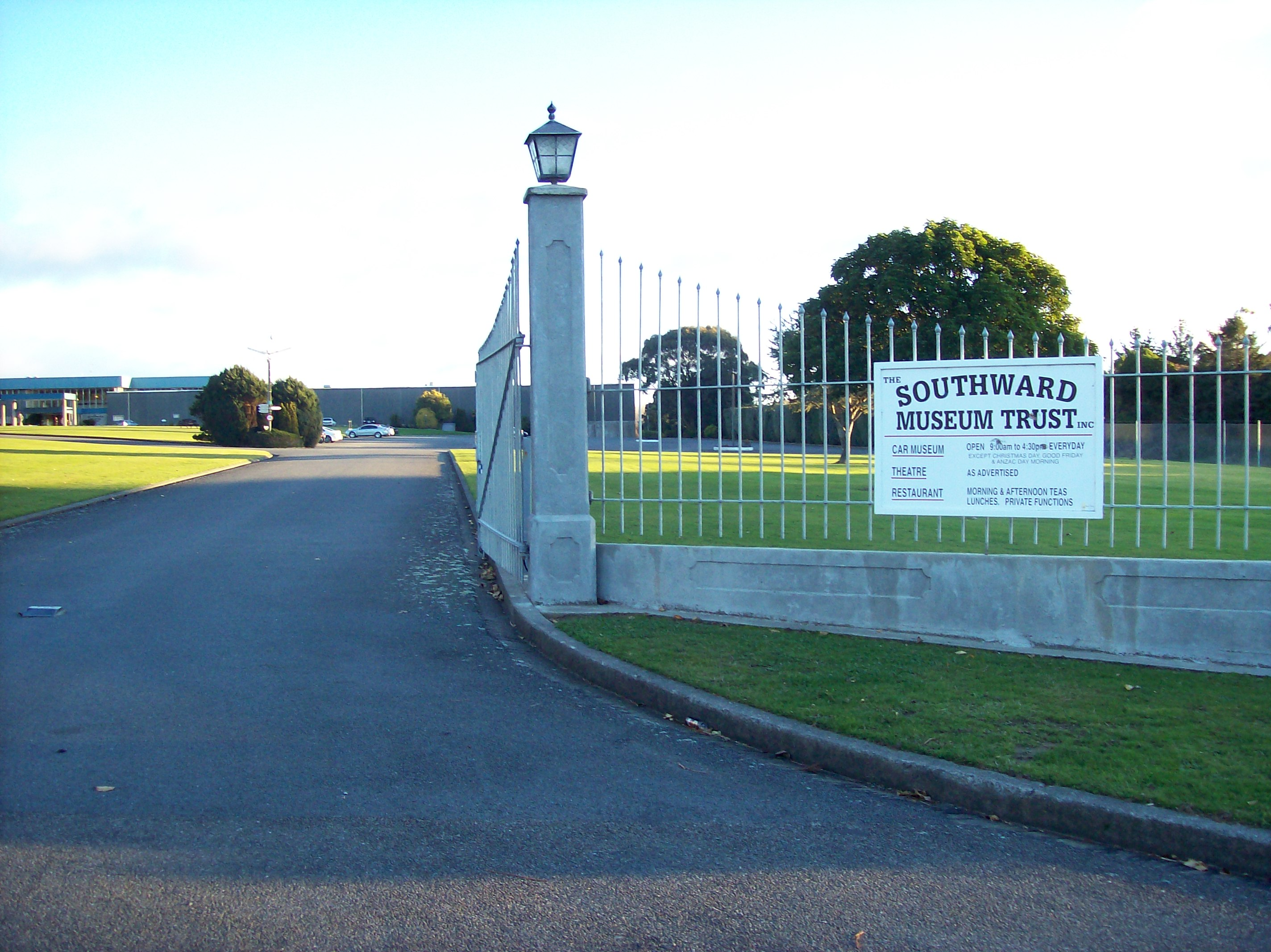
The entrance to Southward Car Museum from Otaihanga Road

Located in Otaihanga is one of the Kāpiti Coast's most significant tourist attractions, the Southward Car Museum on Otaihanga Road between the North Island Main Trunk railway to the west and State Highway 1 to the east. It has one of the largest collections of cars in the Southern Hemisphere and contains other attractions such as heritage planes, and it has a large theatre.

Otaihanga once had an African Lion Safari Park, which closed in 1982.

== Economy ==
Agriculture used to take place, but has now largely ceased as residential developments have been built. Otaihanga has become primarily residential, and some small-scale commercial businesses operate. The Kāpiti Coast's main rubbish tip is in Otaihanga.

== Education ==
There are no educational institutions in Otaihanga, but there are primary schools and a secondary school, Paraparaumu College, minutes away in Paraparaumu. One of the primary schools, Kenakena School, has been involved in works to improve Otaihanga's environment at Greendale Reserve.

== Environment ==
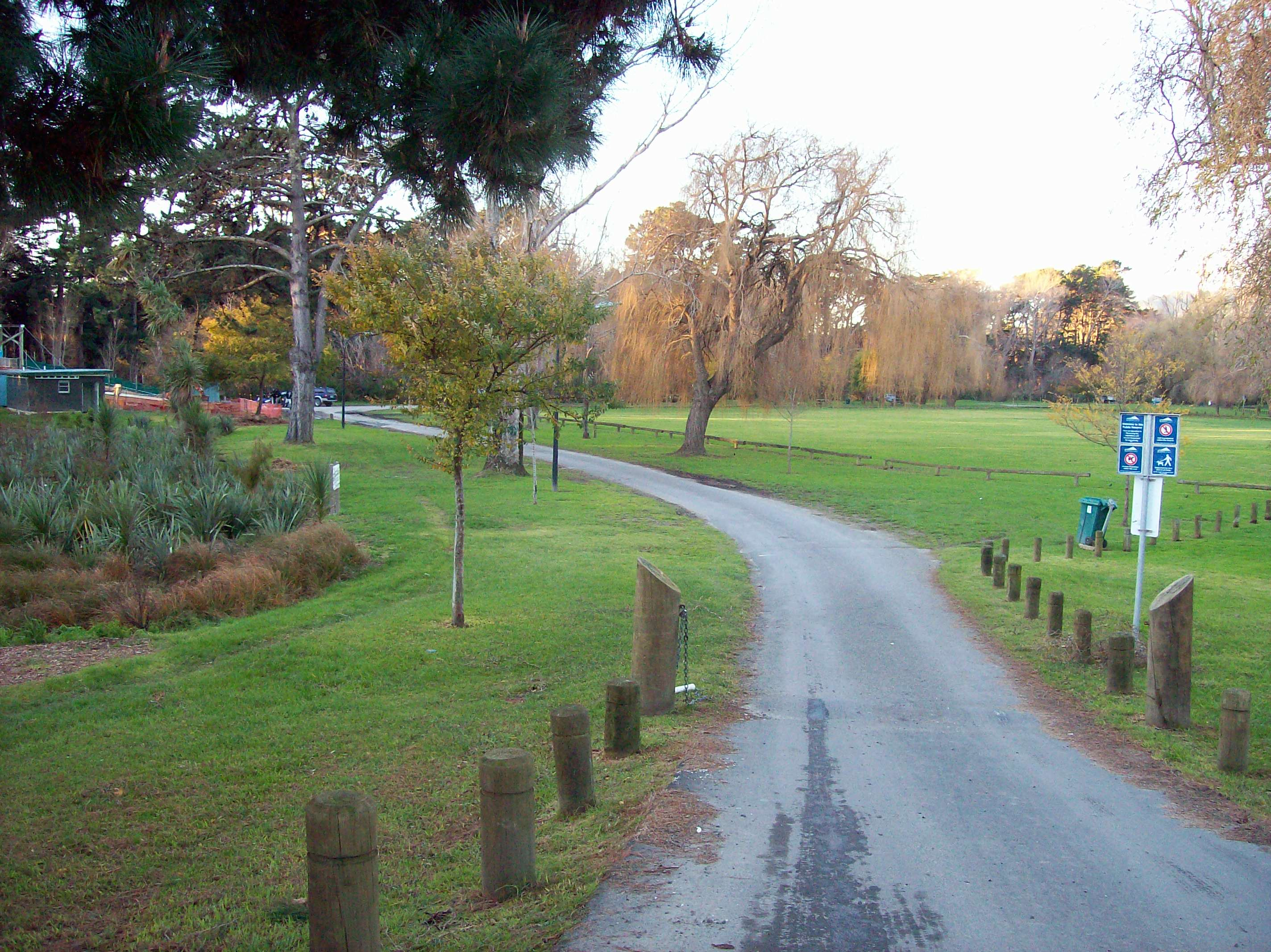
The Makora Road entrance to the Otaihanga Domain

As Otaihanga is on the banks of the Waikanae River, it can be susceptible to flooding during storms and periods of high rainfall. Serious flooding in the first week of January 2005 damaged 18 houses and necessitated the evacuation to higher ground of a number of residents by boat. After the flooding, the raising of three houses was prioritised and long term options such as upgrading flood stopbanks and extracting gravel from the riverbed were investigated.

The main parkland in Otaihanga is the Otaihanga Domain, on the banks of the Waikanae River. It is used for leisure activities and has no sporting facilities. It has family amenities and a footbridge across the river to Waikanae. Another parkland, Greendale Reserve, was formerly two rundown paddocks but it has been the subject of local volunteer efforts to revitalise its environment and restore native plants. These efforts began in 1997 and have involved the students of Kenakena School. In 2006, the volunteer work was honoured by a Conservation Week Merit Award, with the school receiving the 2006 Young Conservationist Award.

== Transport ==
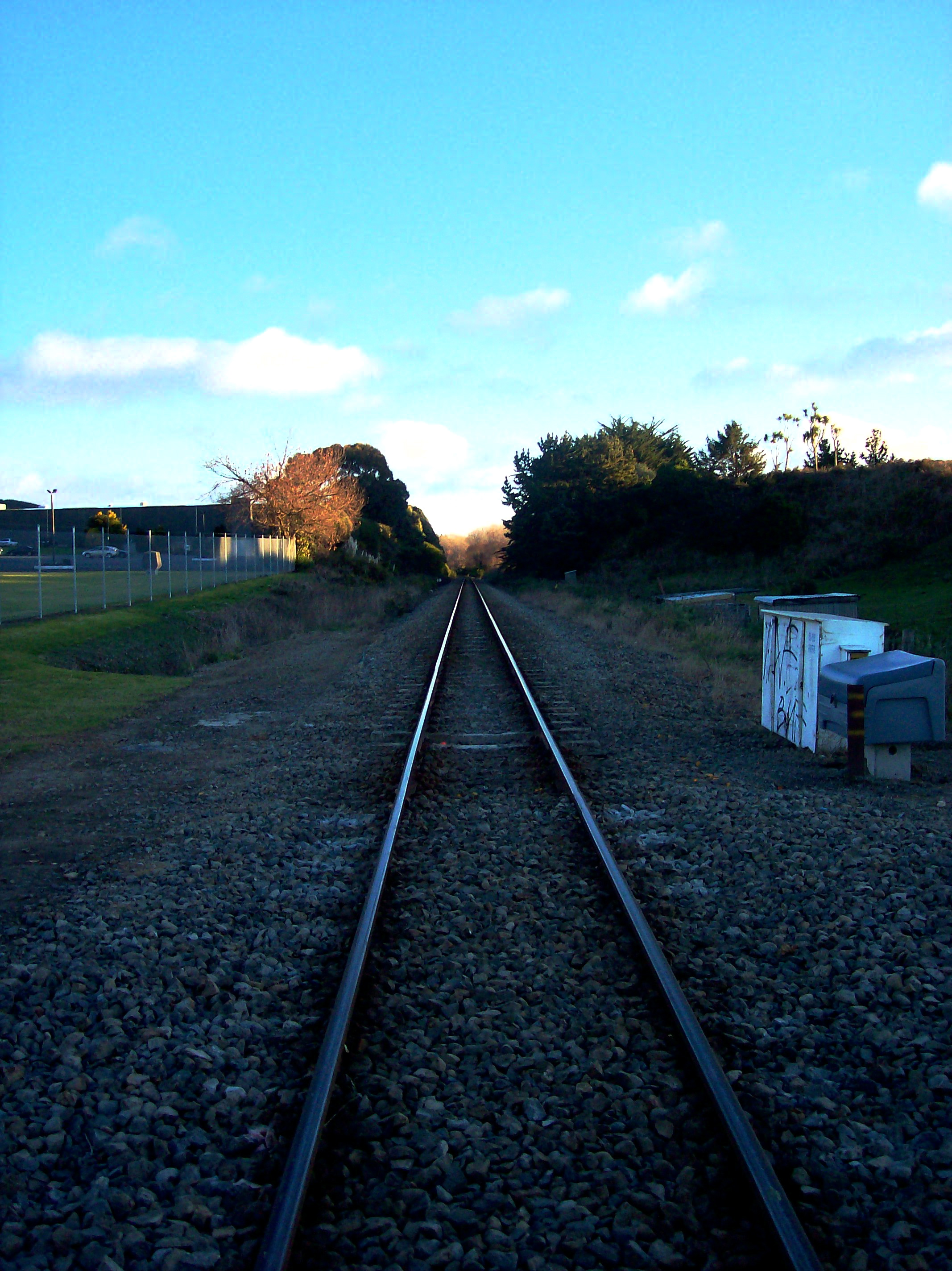
The North Island Main Trunk Railway, looking south from the Otaihanga Road level crossing. On the right is the location of a former halt; on the left is Southward Car Museum.

State Highway 1 runs through eastern Otaihanga. The intersection of the highway and Otaihanga Road is a notorious traffic black spot and in August 2006, Transit New Zealand lowered the speed limit of the highway in the area from 100 km/h to 80 km/h as an attempt to reduce accidents. A roundabout was installed in 2013 but the design of the roundabout has been criticised.

Otaihanga is on the North Island Main Trunk railway, on a section built by the Wellington and Manawatu Railway Company. The two ends of the line met at Otaihanga and the last spike was driven at a public ceremony by Governor William Jervois. The railway opened on 3 November 1886 and passed into the ownership of the New Zealand Railways Department on 8 December 1908. There was a passenger halt at Otaihanga until 1902. Kāpiti Line commuter services stop at Paraparaumu and the terminus at Waikanae.
