= Kenepuru railway station =

Railway station in New Zealand

Kenepuru
- Kenepuru in December 2008

General information
- Location: Bell Street, Tawa, Wellington, New Zealand
- Coordinates: 41°08′58.92″S 174°50′18.6″E
- System: Metlink suburban rail
- Owner: KiwiRail (platforms and track); Greater Wellington Regional Council (shelters and footbridge)
- Line: North Island Main Trunk
- Platforms: Dual side
- Tracks: Main line (2)

Construction
- Parking: No

History
- Opened: 28 April 1963
- Electrified: 24 July 1940

Services
Preceding station	Transdev Wellington	Following station
Porirua towards Waikanae	Kāpiti Line	Linden towards Wellington
Location

Kenepuru railway station is on the North Island Main Trunk Railway (NIMT) in New Zealand, on Wellington's suburban rail network. It is double tracked with side platforms on a curved section of the line, 16.16 km from Wellington railway station, the southern terminus of the NIMT. The station serves the industrial suburb of Kenepuru and is within walking distance of Kenepuru Hospital.

== Services ==
Kenepuru is served by Kāpiti Line commuter trains operated by Transdev Wellington under the Metlink brand operating between Wellington and Porirua or Waikanae. Services are operated by electric multiple units of the FT/FP class (Matangi). Two diesel-hauled carriage trains, the Capital Connection and the Northern Explorer, both pass through the station but do not stop.

Off-peak trains stop at all stations between Wellington and Waikanae. During peak periods, trains from Wellington that stop at all stations may terminate at Porirua or Plimmerton and return to Wellington while a number of peak services run express between Wellington and Porirua and thus do not stop at Kenepuru.

Travel times by train are nineteen minutes to Wellington, two minutes to Porirua, and forty-one minutes to Waikanae.

Trains run every twenty minutes during daytime off-peak hours, more frequently during peak periods, and less frequently at night. Before July 2018, off-peak passenger train services between Wellington and Waikanae stopping at Kenepuru ran every thirty minutes but were increased to one every twenty minutes from 15 July 2018.

Kenepuru was considered for closure by the Greater Wellington Regional Council as it was claimed that it had low usage and required considerable expenditure for upgrading for the new Matangi units, and for safety reasons. However, it was announced on 5 October 2011 that it was safe for now and minor remedial work would be done to extend its life for 10 more years.

The station buildings and platforms were refurbished over the Christmas 2011 break and reopened on 24 January 2012. At a cost of over $320,000 both platforms were resurfaced, the southbound platform was strengthened and the access path to it upgraded (the first refurbishment since the station opened in 1963).

== History ==
The line through Kenepuru was built by the Wellington and Manawatu Railway Company (WMR), completed to Longburn in 1886 and operated by the WMR until December 1908, when the New Zealand Railways Department purchased it and incorporated its line into the NIMT.

On 19 June 1937, the Tawa Flat deviation was opened to the south of Kenepuru. It eliminated the circuitous route via Johnsonville into Wellington. In June 1940 the line through the future site of Kenepuru station was electrified, and on 15 December 1957 it was double tracked.

The railway initially ran through farmland in the Kenepuru area but by 1960 the nearby Kenepuru Hospital was being developed, there was increasing commercial development between Kenepuru Drive and the railway, and the Bell Block subdivision was nearing completion. This created a public demand for an extra railway station in the area. In response, Kenepuru station was opened on the 28 April 1963 with a pedestrian overbridge and pedestrian access to the commercial area and to Kenepuru Drive and the hospital to the west, and to Bell Street to the east. No car parking was provided.
