= Mana railway station =

Railway station in New Zealand

Mana
- Southbound Platform Shelter at Mana Railway Station

General information
- Location: Dolly Varden Crescent, Mana, Porirua, New Zealand
- Coordinates: 41.0955°S 174.8682°E
- System: Metlink suburban rail
- Owner: Greater Wellington Regional Council
- Line: Kāpiti Line section of the North Island Main Trunk
- Platforms: Dual side
- Tracks: Mainline (2)

Construction
- Structure type: Shelter
- Platform levels: 1
- Parking: Yes
- Cycle facilities: Yes

History
- Opened: 5 September 1949
- Rebuilt: 1960?
- Electrified: 24 July 1940

Services
Preceding station	Transdev Wellington	Following station
Plimmerton towards Waikanae	Kāpiti Line	Paremata towards Wellington
Location

Mana railway station on the Kāpiti Line section of the North Island Main Trunk Railway (NIMT) in the locality of Mana in the Paremata suburb of the city of Porirua, New Zealand is part of Wellington's Metlink suburban rail network.

It is double tracked with a platform each side and a subway between them.

== Services ==
Mana is the second station north of Porirua on the Kāpiti Line for commuter trains operated by Transdev Wellington under the Metlink brand contracted to the Greater Wellington Regional Council. Services between Wellington and Porirua or Waikanae are operated by electric multiple units of the FT/FP class (Matangi). Two diesel-hauled carriage trains, the Capital Connection and the Northern Explorer, pass through the station but do not stop. KiwiRail Scenic carriage trains and diesel hauled KiwiRail freight trains pass by the station but do not stop.

Travel times by train are thirty-three minutes to Waikanae, six minutes to Porirua, twenty-seven minutes to Wellington for trains stopping at all stations, and twenty-three minutes for express trains that do not stop between Porirua and Wellington. Trains run every twenty minutes during daytime off-peak hours, more frequently during peak periods, and less frequently at night. Before July 2018, off-peak passenger train services between Wellington and Waikanae ran every thirty minutes but were increased to one every twenty minutes from 15 July 2018. Off-peak trains stop at all stations between Wellington and Waikanae. During peak periods, some trains from Wellington that stop at all stations may terminate at Porirua and return to Wellington while a number of peak services run express or non-stop between Wellington and Porirua before stopping at all stations from Porirua to Waikanae.

== Facilities ==
There are two shelters for passengers waiting for their train, one on the northern side towards Waikanae (terminus of the Kāpiti Line) and one on the southern side towards Wellington CBD

== History ==
The single platform halt was opened on 5 September 1949, when the first of the new DM/D class Electric Multiple Units (EMUs) ordered for the Hutt Valley Line were available. For traffic reasons only EMUs could stop there, although initially only 5 of the 13 trains each way on weekdays were operated by EMUs. The halt (along with the locality) was initially called Dolly Varden, but was changed to Mana in 1960 as many local residents did not like the name (from Dickens's Barnaby Rudge).

Double tracking north to Mana was opened on 7 November 1960. Mana station was built to fit into the duplication project:

and the two platforms were ready some time before … As the new line was on a different alignment to the old, a temporary wooden platform was built to fit in the gap between the old track and the new platforms. This gave the station the appearance of an aircraft carrier flight deck.

The passenger shelters at Mana station were replaced with new shelters in the year ending June 2015.
