= Otaihanga railway station =

Defunct railway station in New Zealand

Otaihanga

General information
- Location: Otaihanga Road, Otaihanga, New Zealand
- Coordinates: 40.8916°S 175.0301°E
- System: Wellington and Manawatu Railway Company (WMR)
- Owner: WMR
- Line: North Island Main Trunk
- Platforms: Side
- Tracks: Main line (2)

History
- Opened: 2 August 1886
- Closed: 30 May 1903
- Electrified: 20 February 2011
Location

Otaihanga railway station was a flag station between Paraparaumu and Waikanae on the Wellington-Manawatu Line in New Zealand, when the line was run by the Wellington and Manawatu Railway Company. This line is now part of the Kapiti section of the North Island Main Trunk.

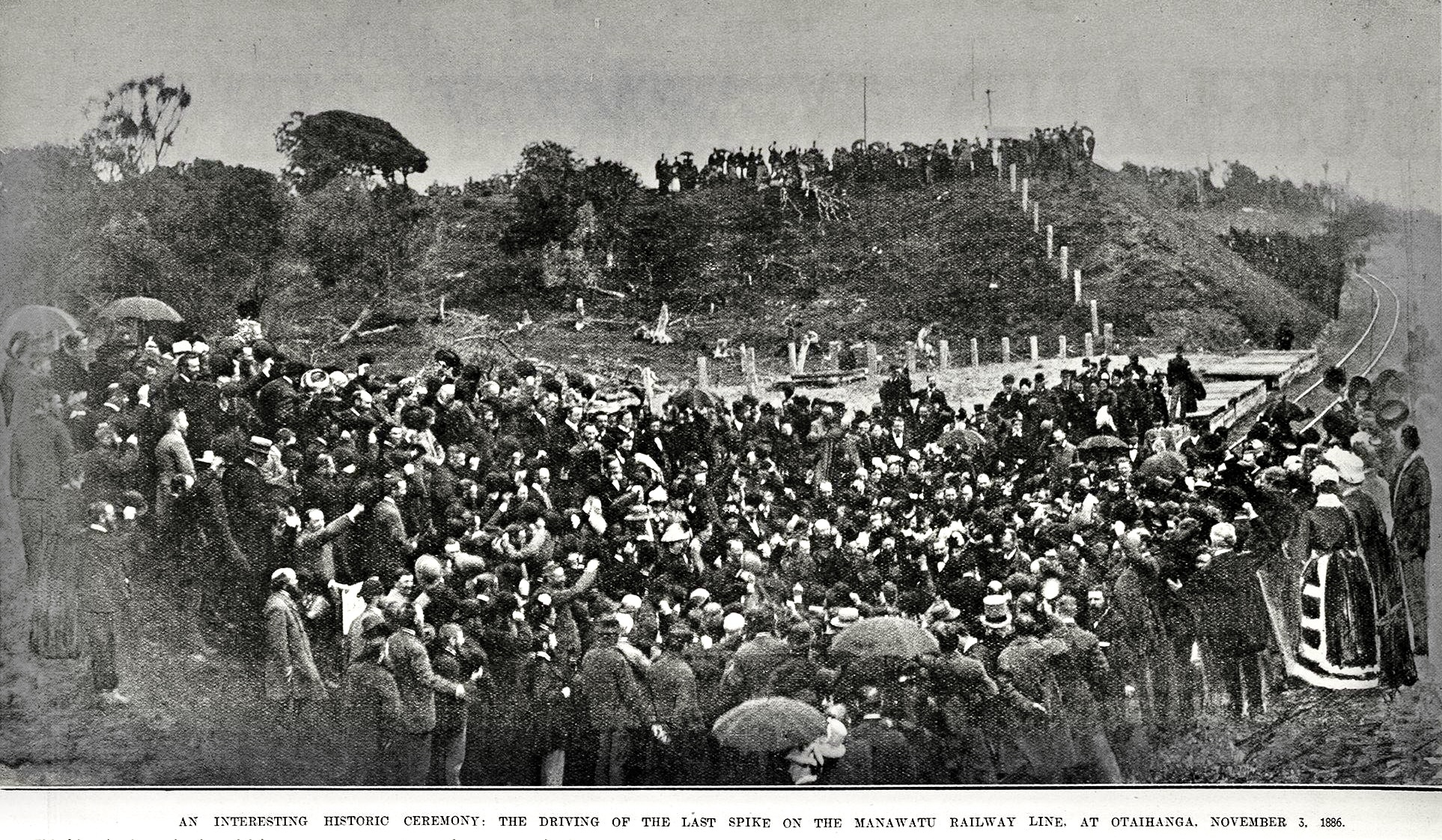
Last spike ceremony at Otaihanga

The station was opened on 2 August 1886. The two ends of the line met at Otaihanga on 27 October, and the last spike was driven at a public ceremony by Governor William Jervois on 3 November 1886 before more than a thousand people. The first revenue-earning train, a stock train from Longburn to Johnsonville with 355 sheep and 60 head of cattle had run on 30 October. The last spike monument is now in the carpark at Southward Car Museum.

The station served Otaihanga, a then-rural area between Paraparaumu and Waikanae which is now mainly residential.

The platform was on the east side of the line according to Cassells, who shows a blind siding on the west side of the line with the south end joining the main line. The station had a waiting shed, and was two miles and nine chains (3.2 km) north of Paraparaumu.

A 1903 WMR advertisement says that the station will be closed from 30 May 1903. Two references say that the station closed in 1902, but neither give a date. Scoble says that the station closed in 1902. Hoy says that Otaihanga closed in 1902 or in "company days". A WMR newspaper advertisement of 12 November 1902 names the station as one of several stations (along with Khandallah, Tawa Flat, Pukerua and Hadfield) where certain trains would not stop (indicating that the station was still open on 12 November).

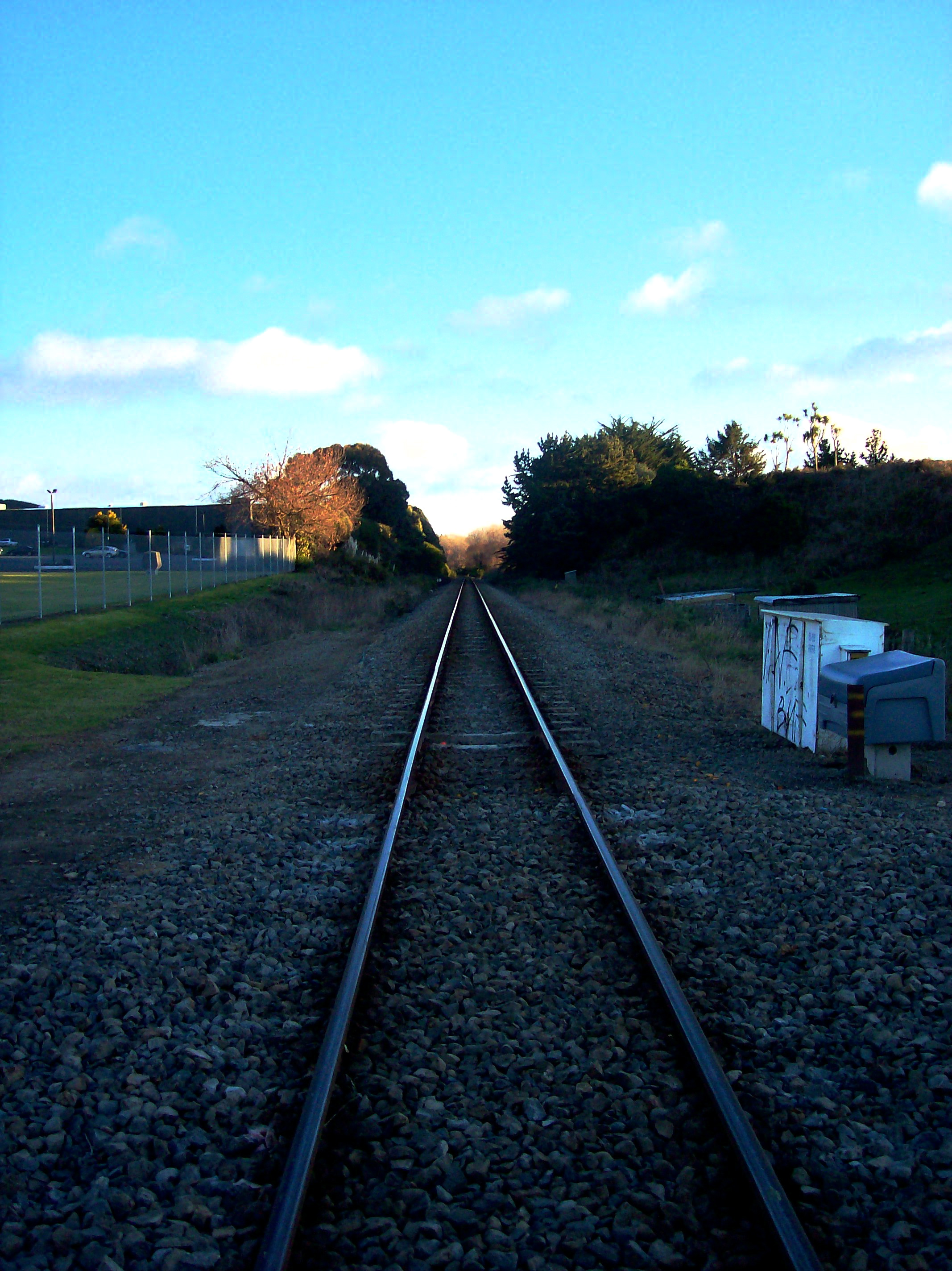
The North Island Main Trunk Railway, looking south from the Otaihanga Road level crossing. On the right is the location of a former halt; on the left is Southward Car Museum.
