= Fort Parramatta =

Ruins in Porirua, New Zealand

Coordinates: 41°5′56.27″S 174°51′58.87″E

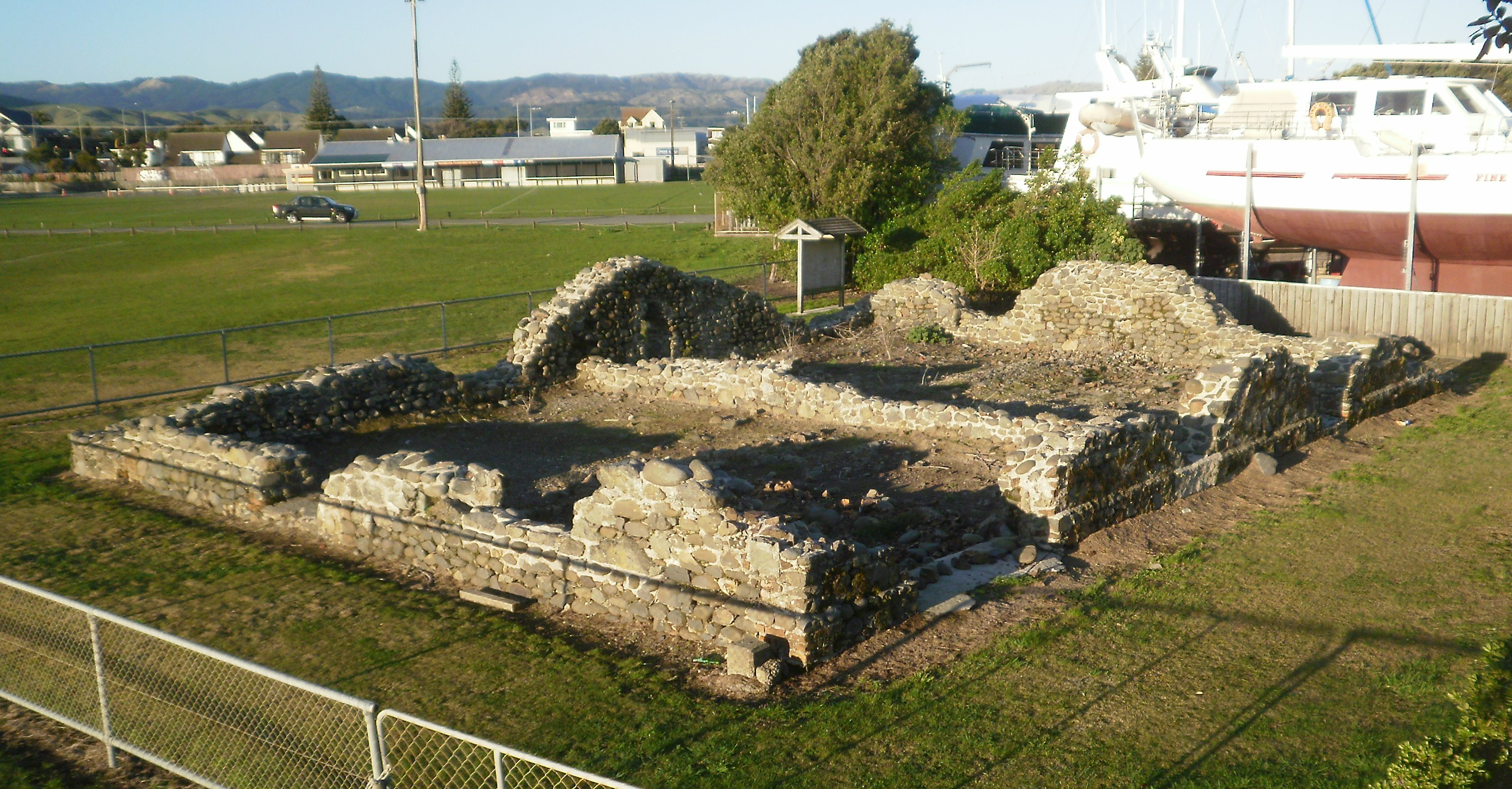
Fort Parramatta in 2012

Fort Parramatta, also known as the Paremata Barracks, was the name given to a fort north of Wellington, New Zealand, in the 1840s. It was built 1846-47. The earthquakes of 1848 and 1855 reduced the building to a ruinous condition. The remains of the fort are still visible on the Ngatitoa Domain in Porirua City, but the surrounding suburb name has been changed to "Paremata".

In 1959 archaeologists, including Janet Davidson, carried out excavations of the barracks. The site is a Category 2 Heritage New Zealand historic place.
