= Paremata =

Suburb of Porirua, New Zealand

Coordinates: 41°07′S 174°52′E

- Suburb
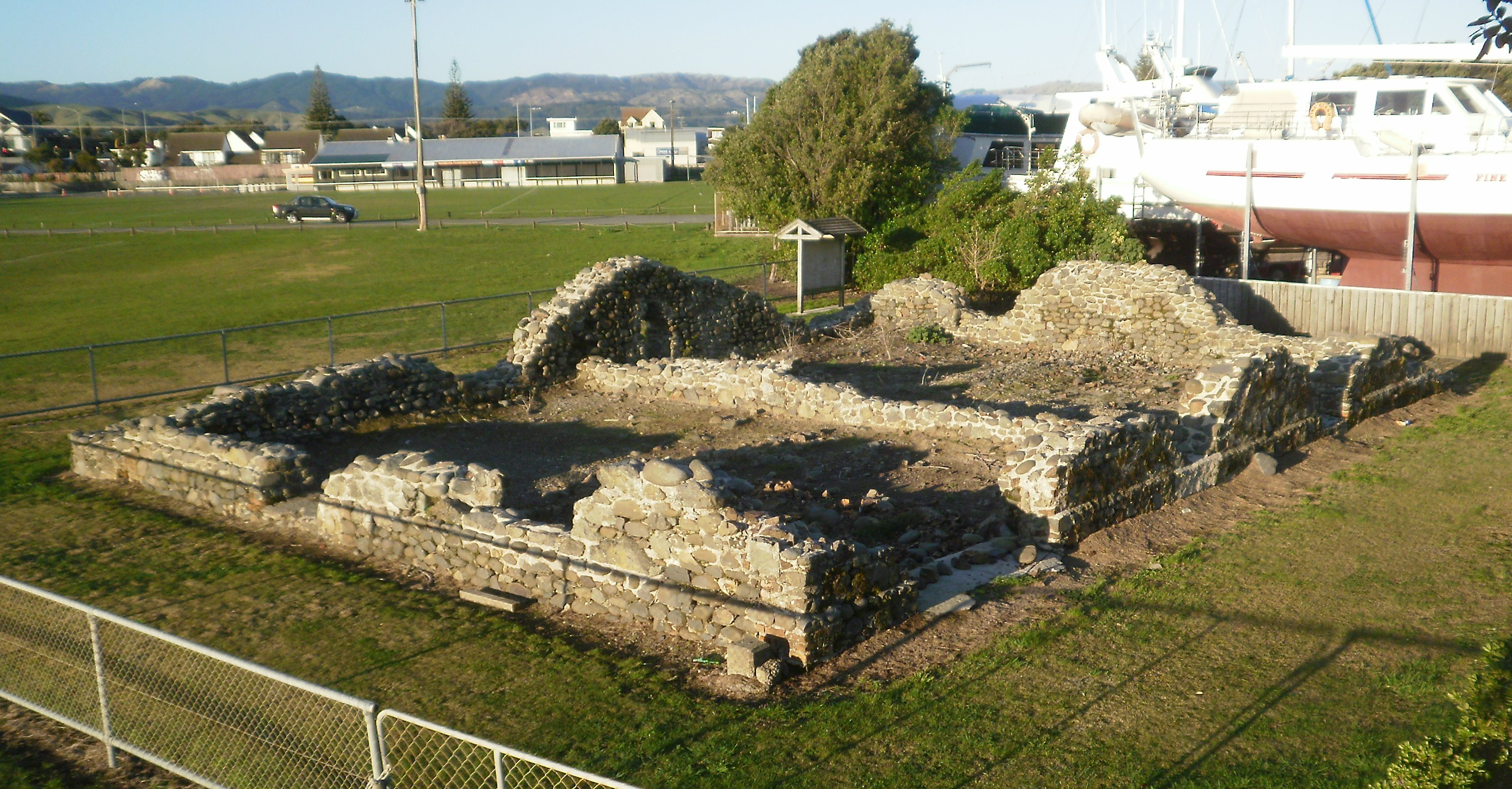
- The historic Paremata Barracks
- Interactive map of Paremata
- Country: New Zealand
- City: Porirua City
- Local authority: Porirua City Council
- Electoral ward: Pāuatahanui General Ward; Porirua Māori Ward

Area
  - Land: 161 ha (400 acres)

Population (June 2025)
  - Total: 2,530
  - Density: 1,570/km^{2} (4,070/sq mi)
- Railway stations: Paremata and Mana

	Camborne
(Porirua Harbour)	Paremata	(Porirua Harbour)
Papakōwhai	Ascot Park	Whitby

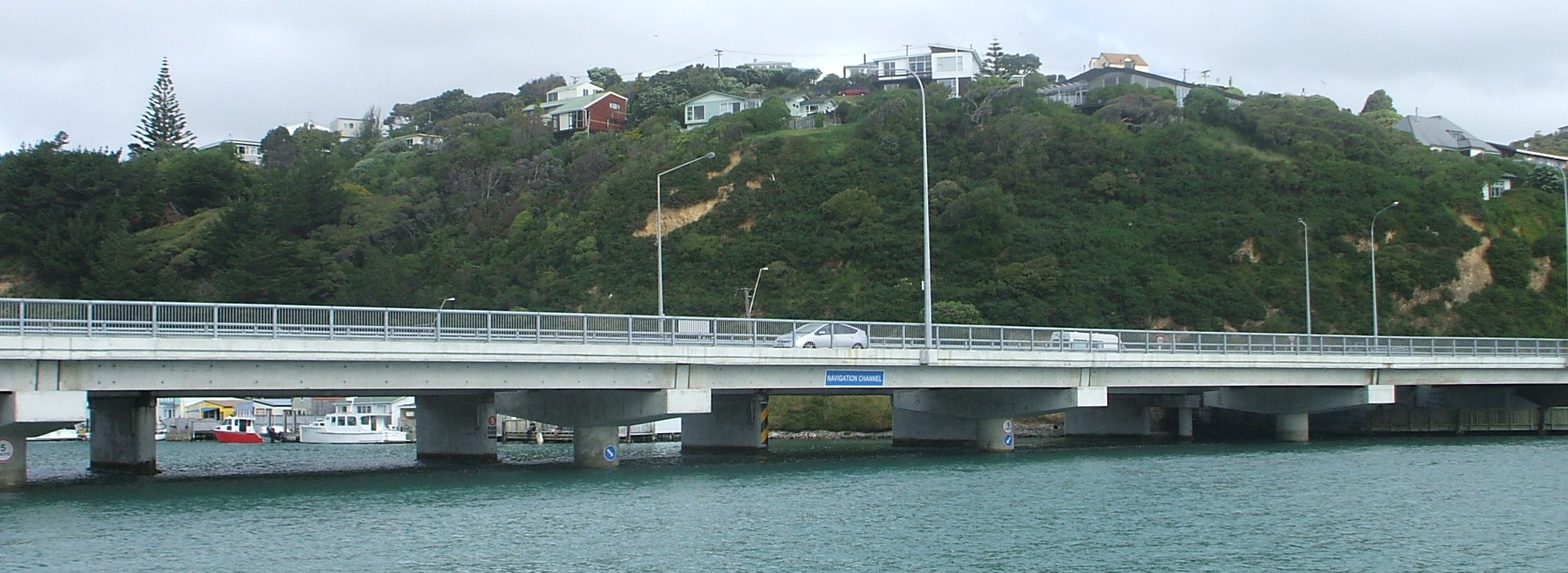
Second bridge between Paremata and Plimmerton

Paremata is a suburb of Porirua, on the Tasman Sea coast to the north of Wellington, New Zealand.

== History ==
=== Early history ===
The modern suburb, just south of Plimmerton, derives its name from the "Paremata Barracks", erected on the north shore of Porirua Harbour in about 1846 when the British Empire became nervous about the local Ngāti Toa tribe under its chief, Te Rauparaha. The stone barracks were largely destroyed by the 1848 Marlborough earthquake.

The Wellington and Manawatu Railway Company built a station at Paremata in 1885 that connected the town with Wellington. In 1936 a road-bridge finally spanned the entrance to the Pāuatahanui Inlet, greatly easing access to Wellington for the growing suburb. After a coast road was built between Pukerua Bay and Paekākāriki further north, the route through Paremata became part of State Highway 1 (SH 1). Later developments to ease congestion included the Paremata Roundabout, just south of the road-bridge, in 2019.

During World War II, United States soldiers were stationed near the barracks, on land that later became the Ngatitoa Domain.

Golden Gate, a historical name used as early as the mid-1950s, generally referred to the eastern area of Paremata. As of 2026 it typically refers to the peninsula — containing the entirety of Seaview Road — that juts out northeastwards between Ivey Bay and Browns Bay.

=== Recent history ===
With the building of the new Paremata railway station south of the inlet, the locality south of the road- and rail-bridges took on the name "Paremata" as well. The street along the original western shoreline south of the inlet had been known as "The Crescent" for decades, but by the end of the 20th century it was commonly called "Paremata Crescent".

The area to the north of the bridges, which included a subdivision called "Dolly Varden" (ultimately named after the pretty heroine of Charles Dickens' Barnaby Rudge of 1841), has become known as "Mana" because the new Mana railway station a little further north acquired that name; probably because it is the first point on the rail journey northwards at which travellers get a view of Mana Island. Current maps identify the areas to the north of the road- and rail-bridges as 'Mana' and the areas to the south as 'Paremata', matching the naming of the railway stations and streets. "Dolly Varden" railway station was renamed "Ngatitoa" and published in the New Zealand Gazette prior to it being renamed "Mana". Dolly Varden was so named after James Walker's skiff.

By the start of the 21st century, several members of the Ngāti Toa iwi had served on the Porirua City Council, and the whole locality around the Ngatitoa Domain had become a busy suburb and fishing-base with housing and commerce. A new suburb, Papakōwhai, has grown on the hills to the south of Paremata, while the large suburb of Whitby has developed to the east, with its main access via SH 58 from the Paremata Roundabout.

In August 2004, a new road-bridge opened for northbound traffic, allowing southbound traffic to use both lanes of the old bridge. This formed part of an ongoing project by Transit New Zealand to address congestion issues and to improve safety of motorists, pedestrians and other local residents accessing SH 1 from side-roads and driveways. By July 2006 a series of traffic-lights had been installed along Mana Esplanade, along with two transit lanes. A second feeder-roundabout had been constructed on SH 58, allowing easier access to Whitby.

The SH 1 route through Paremata was renumbered SH 59 on 7 December 2021, due to SH 1 switching to use the Transmission Gully Motorway.

== Demographics ==
Paremata statistical area covers 1.61 km^{2} (0.62 sq mi) and includes Mana. It had an estimated population of 2,530 as of June 2025, with a population density of 1,571 people per km^{2}.

Historical population
Year	Pop.	±% p.a.
2006	2,280	—
2013	2,364	+0.52%
2018	2,463	+0.82%
2023	2,460	−0.02%

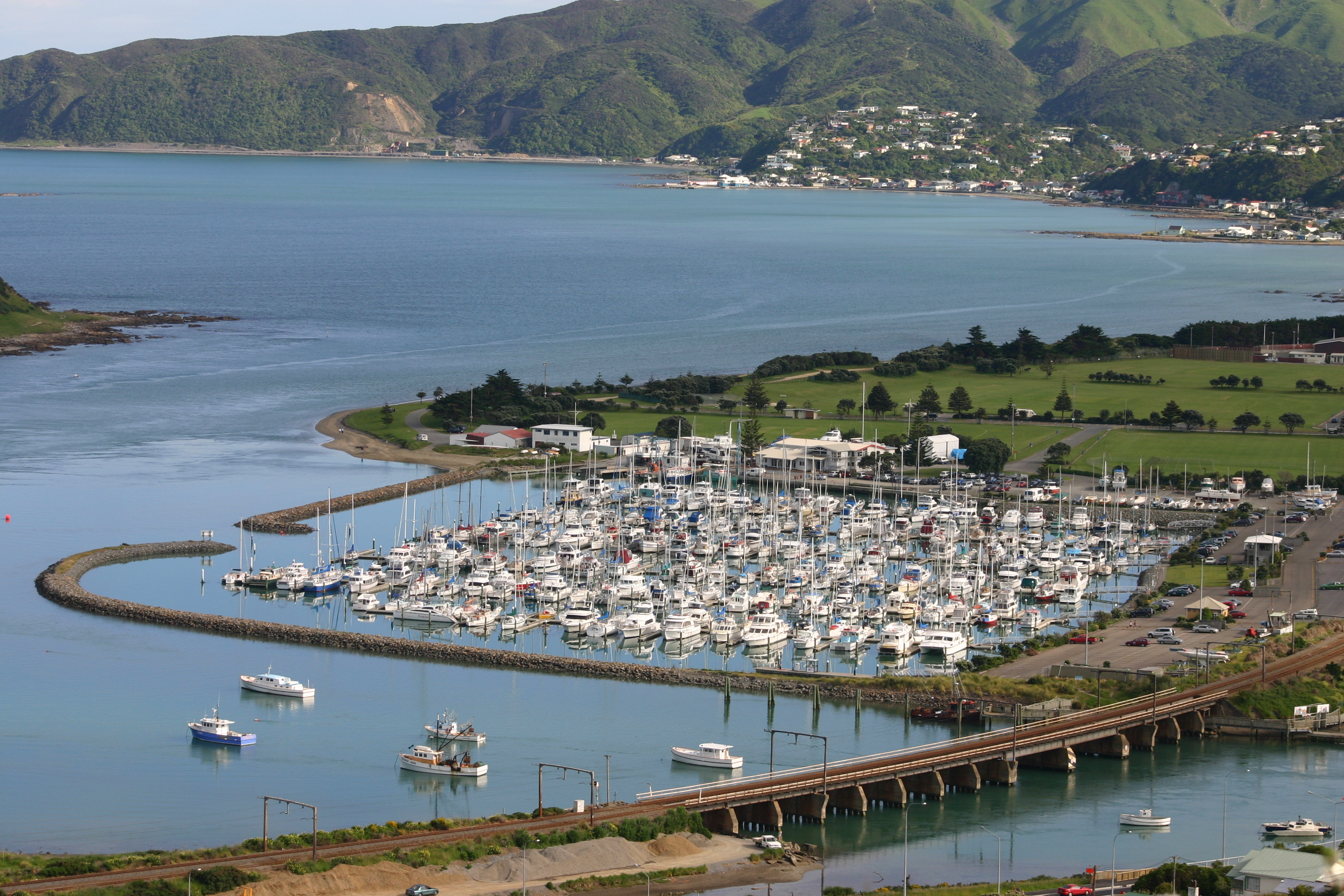
Mana Marina in Paremata

Paremata had a population of 2,460 in the 2023 New Zealand census, a decrease of 3 people (−0.1%) since the 2018 census, and an increase of 96 people (4.1%) since the 2013 census. There were 1,188 males, 1,260 females, and 12 people of other genders in 975 dwellings. 3.5% of people identified as LGBTIQ+. The median age was 45.9 years (compared with 38.1 years nationally). There were 375 people (15.2%) aged under 15 years, 402 (16.3%) aged 15 to 29, 1,167 (47.4%) aged 30 to 64, and 513 (20.9%) aged 65 or older.

People could identify as more than one ethnicity. The results were 87.6% European (Pākehā); 15.9% Māori; 8.0% Pasifika; 4.9% Asian; 1.0% Middle Eastern, Latin American and African New Zealanders (MELAA); and 2.3% other, which includes people giving their ethnicity as "New Zealander". English was spoken by 97.8%, Māori by 3.2%, Samoan by 2.2%, and other languages by 10.7%. No language could be spoken by 1.7% (e.g. too young to talk). New Zealand Sign Language was known by 0.2%. The percentage of people born overseas was 23.3, compared with 28.8% nationally.

Religious affiliations were 29.3% Christian, 0.1% Hindu, 0.6% Islam, 0.5% Māori religious beliefs, 1.0% Buddhist, 0.5% New Age, 0.1% Jewish, and 1.1% other religions. People who answered that they had no religion were 60.4%, and 6.7% of people did not answer the census question.

Of those at least 15 years old, 771 (37.0%) people had a bachelor's or higher degree, 1,023 (49.1%) had a post-high school certificate or diploma, and 285 (13.7%) people exclusively held high school qualifications. The median income was $59,400, compared with $41,500 nationally. 534 people (25.6%) earned over $100,000 compared to 12.1% nationally. The employment status of those at least 15 was 1,185 (56.8%) full-time, 273 (13.1%) part-time, and 42 (2.0%) unemployed.

== Education ==
Paremata School is a co-educational state primary school for Year 1 to 8 students, with a roll of 289 as of March 2026. It opened in 1921.

== See also ==
- Fort Parramatta
