= Mana, New Zealand =

Mana
- Suburb
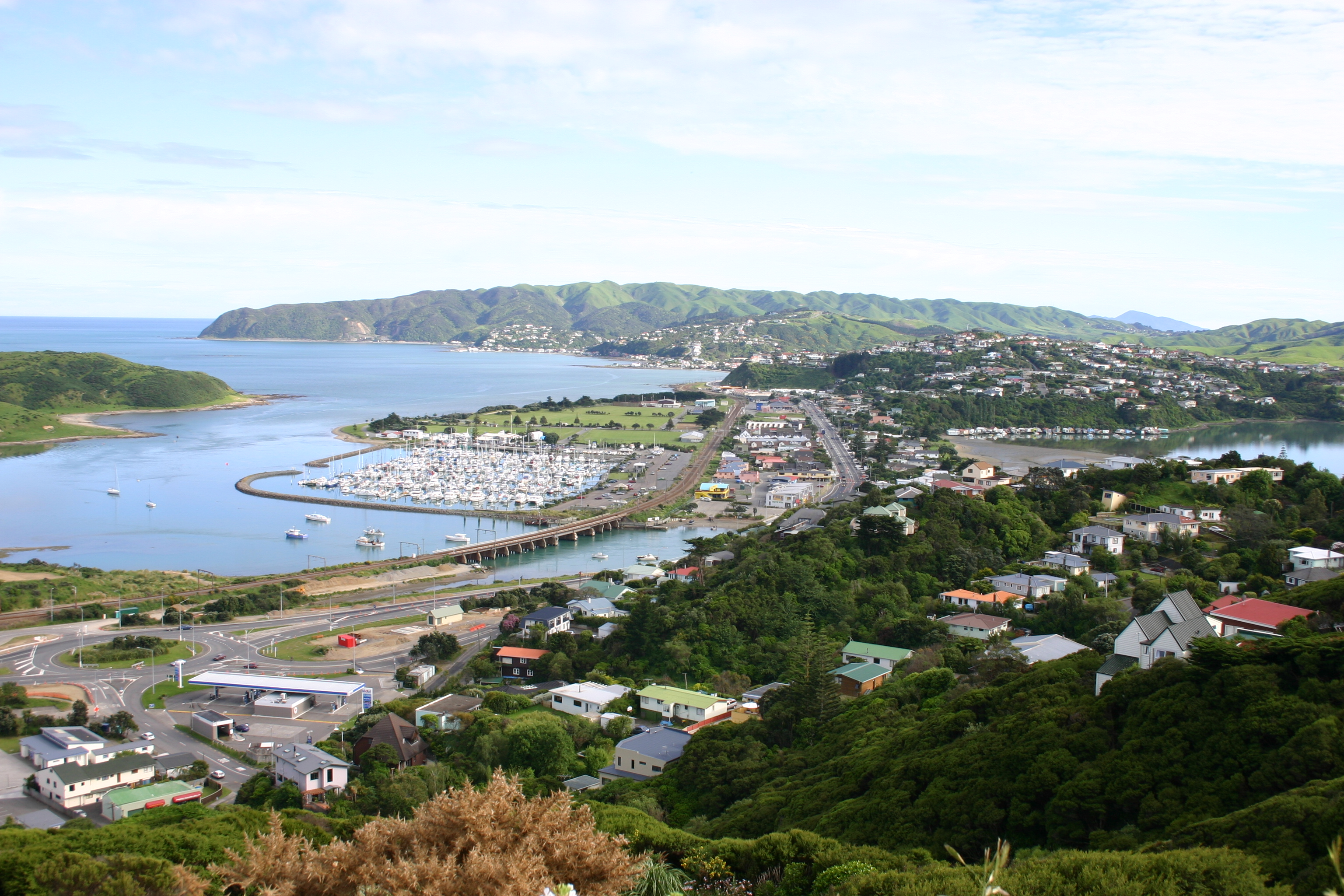
- Mana Peninsula
- Interactive map of Mana
- Coordinates: 41°05′51″S 174°52′10″E
- Country: New Zealand
- City: Porirua
- Electoral ward: Pāuatahanui General Ward

Area
  - Land: 58 ha (140 acres)

Population (2023 census)
  - Total: 648
  - Density: 1,100/km^{2} (2,900/sq mi)
- Train stations: Mana railway station

	Camborne
Porirua Harbour	Mana	Porirua Harbour
	Paremata

Mana is a locality of Porirua City in New Zealand, part of the suburb of Paremata. The area occupies a narrow isthmus — bounded to the west by the entrance to Porirua Harbour, and to the east by the Pauatahanui inlet arm of Porirua Harbour. Mana Island lies about three kilometres west of the isthmus.

State Highway 59 and the North Island Main Trunk railway both pass through the centre of Mana; the state-highway route previously formed part of State Highway 1 (SH1) until SH 1 diverted to use the Transmission Gully Motorway on 7 December 2021. A significant increase in the traffic capacity through Mana occurred in 2005-2006 when a second bridge on the state-highway route came into use at the southern end, transit lanes were introduced and several sets of traffic lights were added as part of the SH1 Plimmerton to Paremata upgrade.

== History ==
Mana was known as Dolly Varden (after a boat which commemorated the name of the heroine of Charles Dickens' 1841 novel Barnaby Rudge) until 1960 when local pressure resulted in the area being renamed Mana.

== Demographics ==
Mana covers 0.58 km^{2} (0.22 sq mi). It is part of the larger Paremata statistical area.

Historical population
Year	Pop.	±% p.a.
2006	564	—
2013	621	+1.38%
2018	690	+2.13%
2023	648	−1.25%

Mana had a population of 648 in the 2023 New Zealand census, a decrease of 42 people (−6.1%) since the 2018 census, and an increase of 27 people (4.3%) since the 2013 census. There were 312 males, 327 females, and 3 people of other genders in 282 dwellings. 3.2% of people identified as LGBTIQ+. There were 87 people (13.4%) aged under 15 years, 117 (18.1%) aged 15 to 29, 291 (44.9%) aged 30 to 64, and 159 (24.5%) aged 65 or older.

People could identify as more than one ethnicity. The results were 85.2% European (Pākehā); 18.1% Māori; 9.3% Pasifika; 4.6% Asian; 2.3% Middle Eastern, Latin American and African New Zealanders (MELAA); and 1.9% other, which includes people giving their ethnicity as "New Zealander". English was spoken by 97.7%, Māori by 3.2%, Samoan by 2.3%, and other languages by 13.0%. No language could be spoken by 1.4% (e.g. too young to talk). The percentage of people born overseas was 24.1, compared with 28.8% nationally.

Religious affiliations were 29.2% Christian, 0.5% Hindu, 0.5% Islam, 1.9% Māori religious beliefs, and 1.9% other religions. People who answered that they had no religion were 58.8%, and 7.4% of people did not answer the census question.

Of those at least 15 years old, 198 (35.3%) people had a bachelor's or higher degree, 285 (50.8%) had a post-high school certificate or diploma, and 81 (14.4%) people exclusively held high school qualifications. 126 people (22.5%) earned over $100,000 compared to 12.1% nationally. The employment status of those at least 15 was 312 (55.6%) full-time, 72 (12.8%) part-time, and 15 (2.7%) unemployed.
