= Paraparaumu railway station =

Railway station in New Zealand

Paraparaumu
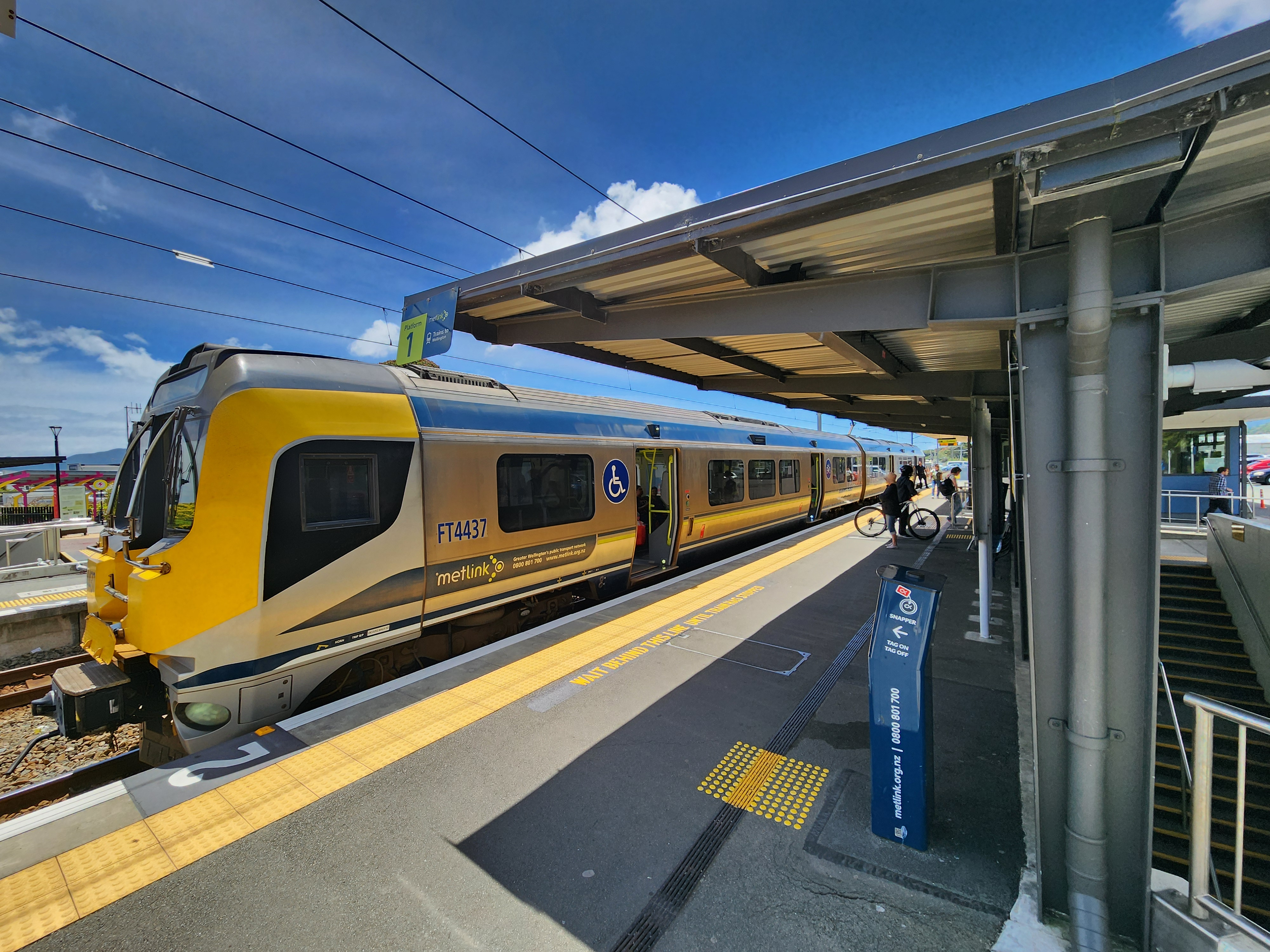
- Paraparaumu railway station in 2025

General information
- Location: Epiha Street, Paraparaumu, New Zealand
- Coordinates: 40°55′01″S 175°00′25″E
- System: Metlink suburban rail
- Owner: Greater Wellington Regional Council
- Line: North Island Main Trunk
- Platforms: 1 Bay/Island Platform 2 Side Platforms
- Tracks: Mainline (2), Bay platform (1)

Construction
- Parking: Yes

Other information
- Fare zone: 9

History
- Opened: 2 August 1886
- Rebuilt: 1900s, June 2010 – February 2011
- Electrified: 7 May 1983

Services
Preceding station	Transdev Wellington	Following station
Waikanae Terminus	Kāpiti Line	Paekākāriki towards Wellington
Preceding station	KiwiRail	Following station
Waikanae towards Palmerston North	Capital Connection	Wellington Terminus
Preceding station	Great Journeys New Zealand	Following station
Palmerston North towards Auckland Strand	Northern Explorer	Wellington Terminus
Location

Paraparaumu railway station in Paraparaumu on the Kāpiti Coast, New Zealand, is an intermediate station on the Kāpiti Line section of the North Island Main Trunk for Metlink's electric multiple unit commuter trains from Wellington. Paraparaumu was the northern terminal for Kāpiti Line services from 7 May 1983 until 20 February 2011 when the electrification and Kāpiti Line services were extended to Waikanae.

== Services ==
Paraparaumu is the last station before Waikanae, the northern terminal for Kāpiti Line commuter trains operated by Transdev Wellington under the Metlink brand operating between Wellington and Porirua or Waikanae. Services are operated by electric multiple units of the FT/FP class (Matangi). Two diesel-hauled carriage trains, the Capital Connection and the Northern Explorer, stop at Paraparaumu.

Travel times by train are six minutes to Waikanae, thirty-three minutes to Porirua, and fifty-four minutes to Wellington for trains stopping at all stations and forty-nine minutes for express trains that do not stop between Porirua and Wellington. Trains run every twenty minutes during daytime off-peak hours, more frequently during peak periods, and less frequently at night. Before July 2018, off-peak passenger train services between Wellington and Waikanae ran every thirty minutes but were increased to one every twenty minutes from 15 July 2018. Off peak trains stop at all stations between Wellington and Waikanae. During peak periods, some trains from Wellington that stop at all stations may terminate at Porirua and return to Wellington while a number of peak services run express or non-stop between Wellington and Porirua before stopping at all stations from Porirua to Waikanae.

The station is also served by the Capital Connection in both directions, which runs express between Paraparaumu and Wellington. It was formerly a stop on the Overlander service between Auckland and Wellington, but was not retained initially when that service was replaced by the Northern Explorer in June 2012. Following public feedback, it was reinstated as a stop for the Northern Explorer in October 2012.

The station also serves as a major interchange point with Metlink bus services.

Metlink bus routes 250, 260, 261 and 262 serve Paraparaumu station. Routes 251, 264, 280 and 290 also use Paraparaumu station less frequently.

== History ==
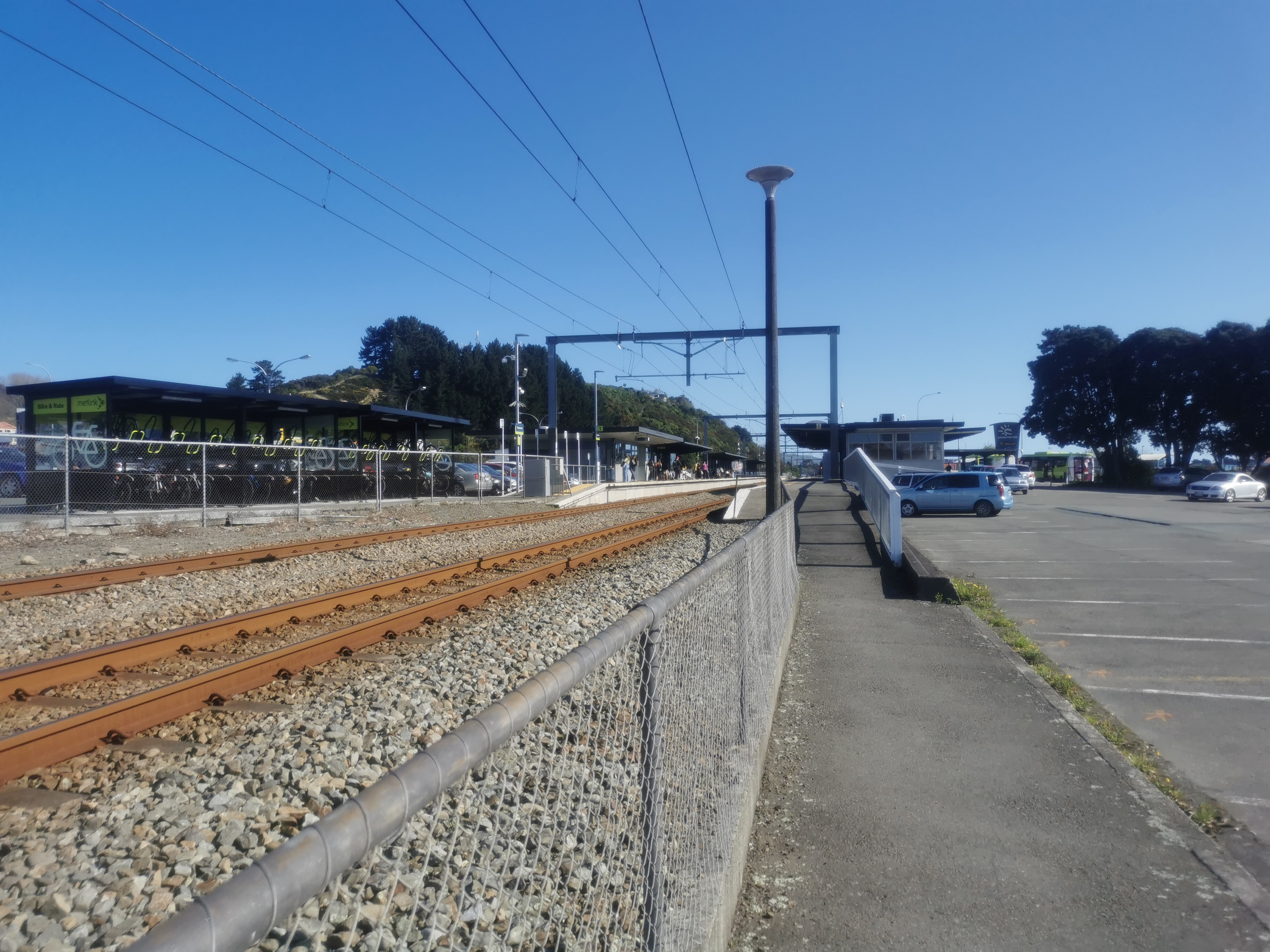
Paraparaumu Station from the Northern side looking South towards Wellington

The station was opened on 2 August 1886 (Hoy says c1886), and was on the Wellington-Manawatu Line from Wellington to Longburn built by the Wellington and Manawatu Railway Company (WMR). The section was opened on 3 November 1886 at Otaihanga.

The original station building, a WMR Class Six or Flag Station, was replaced by the Class Four building from Shannon in 1893 (Hoy says early 1900s). After the WMR line was acquired by the Government in 1908 the station continued to serve passengers on NIMT services. In 1961 the station building was replaced with a modern design, built to serve both trains and Road Service buses. This was followed by a new goods shed in 1963.

During the 1970s, Wellington commuter services began to serve the station. These services were hauled by diesel locomotives – usually the DA class – from Paekākāriki which was the-then terminus of the electrification. These were a combination of carriage trains and DM/D class EMUs under tow. The platform was raised in 1975 to accommodate these services.

The electrification was subsequently extended to Paraparaumu and opened on 7 May 1983, soon after the arrival of the Ganz-Mavag EM/ET class EMUs which dominated services for most of the next 30 years. The commuter service was extended further to Waikanae on 20 February 2011 which coincided with the introduction of the new Matangi EMUs to service.

The station layout itself has changed over the years. Prior to the electrification being extended to Waikanae in 2011 (along with the double-tracking from Mackay's Crossing), the station had a dock platform west of the mainline, a side platform on the mainline (effectively forming an island platform) and a passing loop on the eastern side. The upgrade works have seen a new side platform constructed on the new down main (the former passing loop) and a pedestrian underpass built to connect the two platforms, replacing an earlier overbridge connecting the platforms to a car park. The dock platform has been retained but does not see regular usage. It is one of three stations on the Wellington network with more than two platforms, the others being Wellington and Plimmerton stations.

In 2018, there were complaints that the station access ramps and subways were too steep for disabled users (with a grade of 1 in 8 rather than 1 in 12) and were slippery.
