= Porirua railway station =

Railway station in New Zealand

Porirua
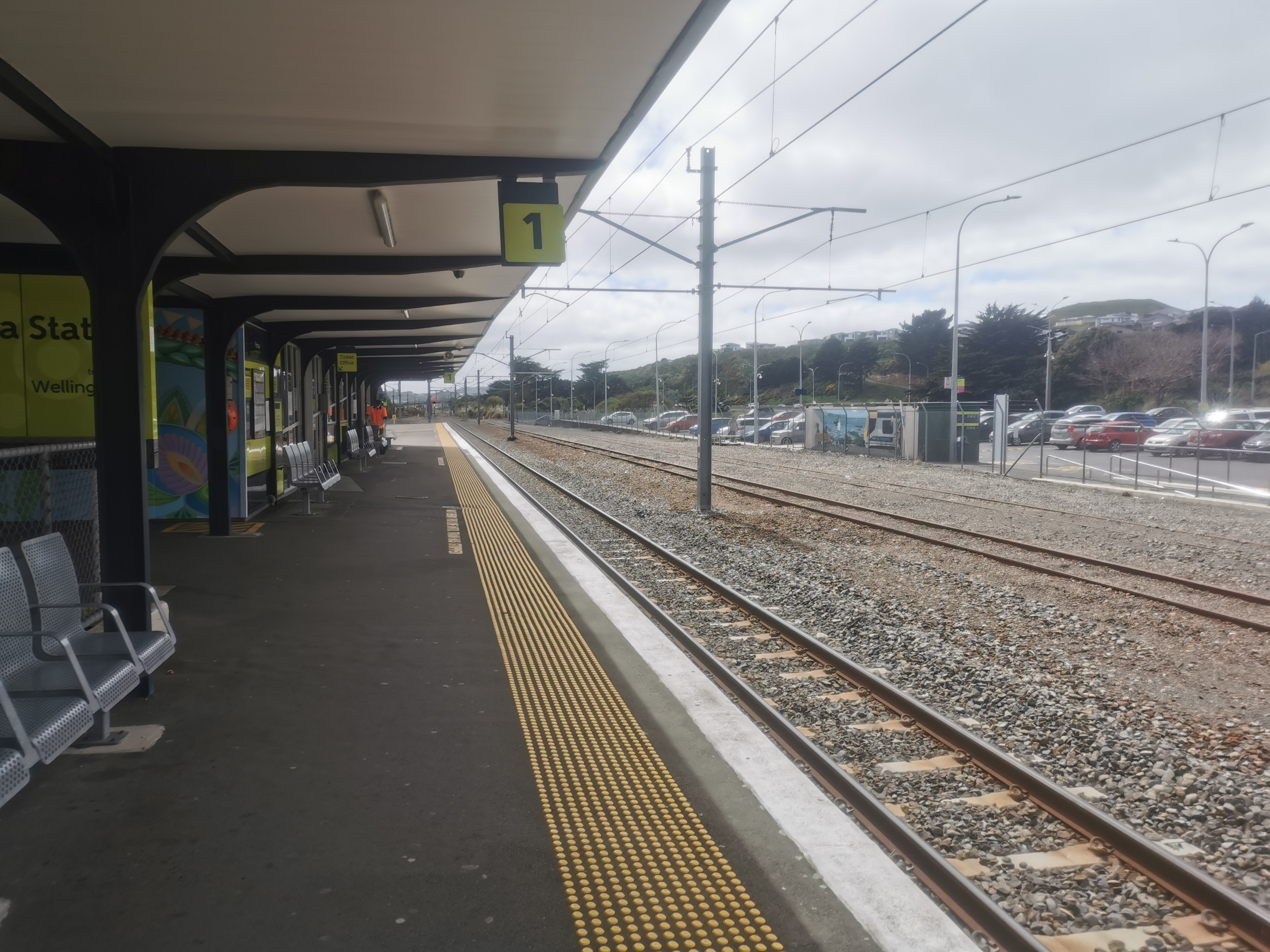
- Platform 1 at Porirua Train Station

General information
- Location: Station Road, Porirua, New Zealand
- Coordinates: 41.1376°S 174.8434°E
- System: Metlink suburban rail
- Owner: KiwiRail (platform and track); Greater Wellington Regional Council (building and subway)
- Line: North Island Main Trunk
- Platforms: Island Platform
- Tracks: Mainline (2)

Construction
- Platform levels: 1
- Parking: Yes
- Cycle facilities: Yes

History
- Opened: 21 September 1885
- Rebuilt: 1960
- Electrified: 24 July 1940

Services
Preceding station	Transdev Wellington	Following station
Paremata towards Waikanae	Kāpiti Line	Kenepuru towards Wellington
Location

Porirua railway station is an important intermediate station in New Zealand on the Kāpiti Line from Wellington and is part of Wellington's Metlink suburban rail network operated by Transdev Wellington.

The island platform urban railway station is on a double track section of the North Island Main Trunk which was opened in 1885 as a single main line on the alignment of today's Down (southbound) line. There is subway access to Porirua city centre and bus stops serving the Porirua area.

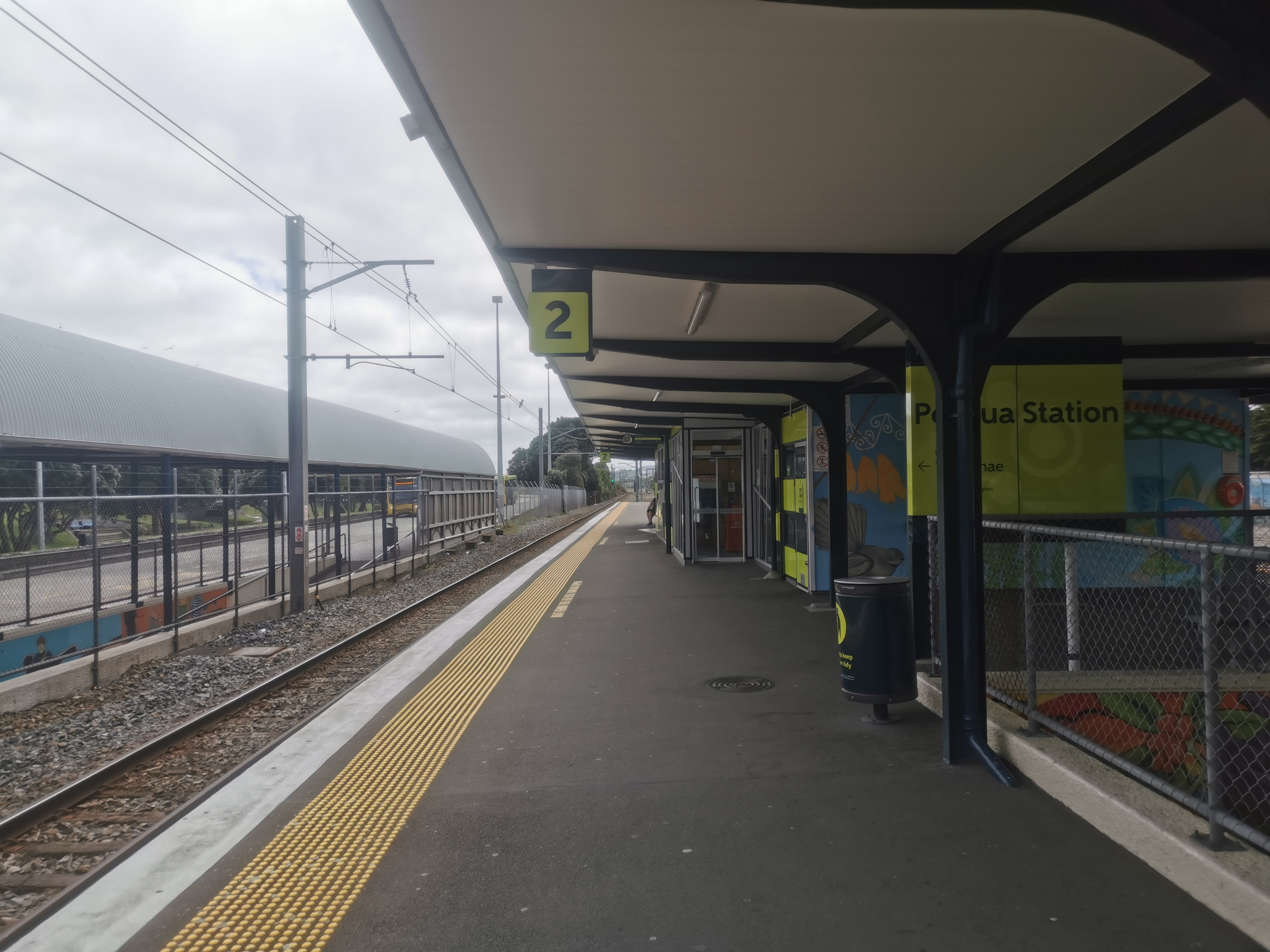
Platform 2 at Porirua Train Station

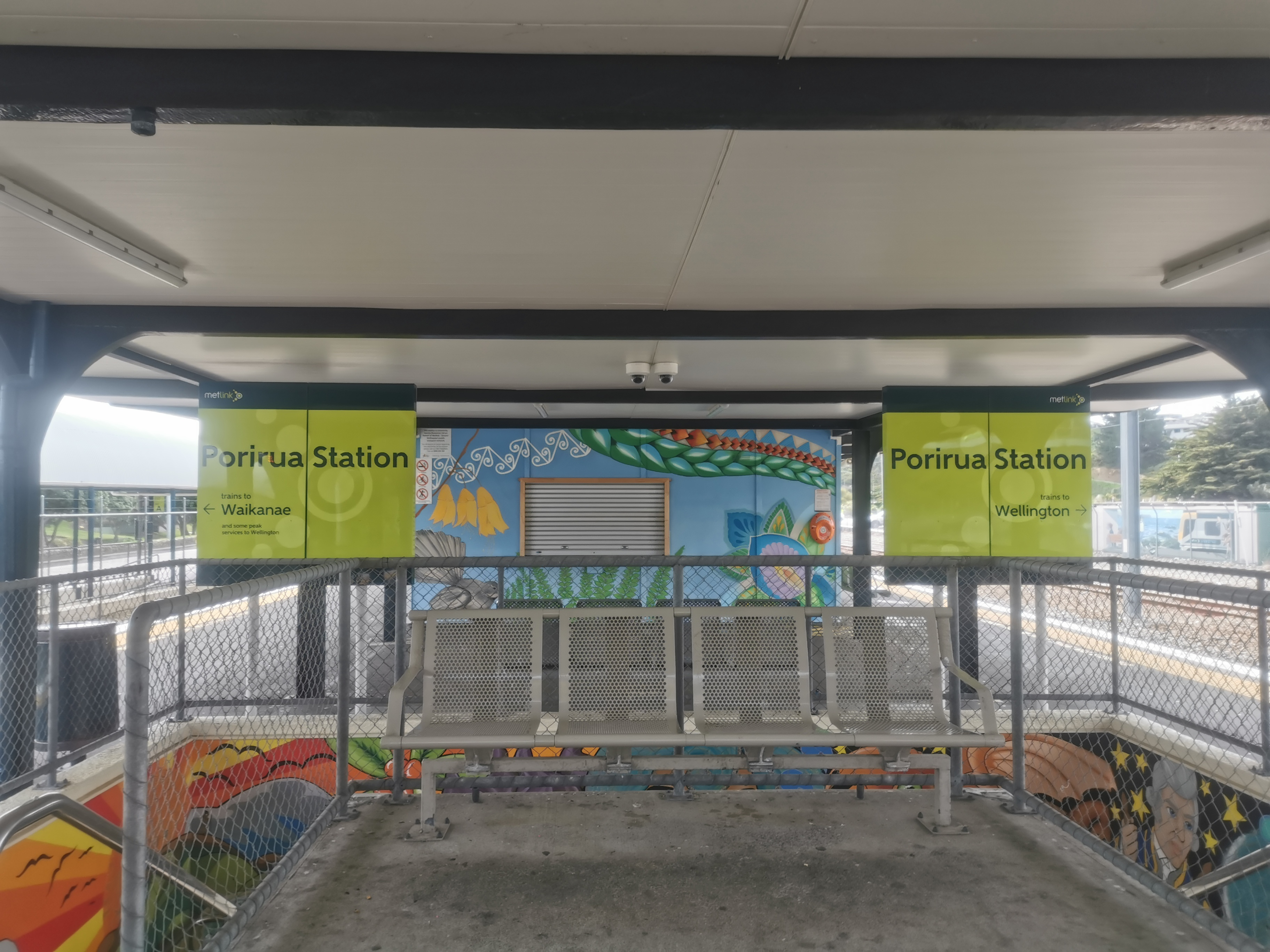
Subway Entrance to Porirua City and Bus shelter

== Services ==
Porirua is served by electric multiple units owned by Greater Wellington Regional Council and operated on its behalf by Transdev.

Porirua is served by Kāpiti Line commuter trains operated by Transdev Wellington under the Metlink brand operating between Wellington and Porirua or Waikanae. Services are operated by electric multiple units of the FT/FP class (Matangi). Two diesel-hauled carriage trains, the Capital Connection and the Northern Explorer, pass through the station but do not stop.

Off-peak trains stop at all stations between Wellington and Waikanae. During peak periods, trains from Wellington that stop at all stations may terminate at Porirua or Plimmerton and return to Wellington while a number of peak services run express between Wellington and Porirua.

Travel times by train are twenty-one minutes to Wellington, and thirty-nine minutes to Waikanae.

Trains run every twenty minutes during daytime off-peak hours, more frequently during peak periods, and less frequently at night. Before July 2018, off-peak passenger train services between Wellington and Waikanae stopping at Porirua ran every thirty minutes but were increased to one every twenty minutes from 15 July 2018.

The station is the hub for bus services west to Titahi Bay and east to Porirua East and Ascot Park. Hoy wrote in 1968 that the importance of Porirua

is shown by the activity of arriving and departing trains and the fact that nearly half the weekday services terminate there. A goods shed and lengthy yard is available for local industries. A casual observer will perhaps wonder where the City obtains its importance until he looks at the line of buses both private and N.Z.R. waiting to take passengers on to Porirua East and Titahi Bay. Well over 1,000,000 passengers are brought to the station annually on the Government buses alone. Porirua station is of modern design with a glassed-in ticket office and waiting room at the northern end, while subways link the two bus stands on each side of the track.

In 2010–11 improvements costing over $1 million were made to the station building, platforms etc.

In 2014 it was described as, "the region's second busiest station".

On 10 March 2014, work, expected to take 3 months, started on improvements to the southern part of the commuter parking. Further expansion in 2015 brought the park and ride provision to 480, with 172 to be added in 2017. Car parking is free, whereas fares on connecting local buses were $2 in 2017.

== History ==
The line was built by the Wellington and Manawatu Railway Company (WMR), and the section via Johnsonville through Porirua to Paremata was opened on 24 September 1885. The line was taken over by the government in 1908, and electrified in 1940 after the opening of the Tawa Flat deviation. Electrification allowed the replacement of steam locomotives with ED class electric locomotives, purchased for use on this line and first introduced in 1938, to haul passenger and goods trains. DM/D electric multiple units first ran to Porirua on 5 September 1949 and replaced the majority of locomotive-hauled passenger trains.

The line was double tracked from Tawa to Porirua on 15 December 1957, and the new island-platform Porirua station opened when the Porirua-Paremata doubling and deviations were opened by the Minister of Railways north to Mana on 7 November 1960, which had been authorised by the Finance Act 1958.

Shortly after the release of the film Goodbye Pork Pie in 1981, a car got stuck in the station's pedestrian subway after the driver tried to imitate the Wellington railway station chase scene.
