= Plimmerton railway station =

Railway station in New Zealand

Plimmerton
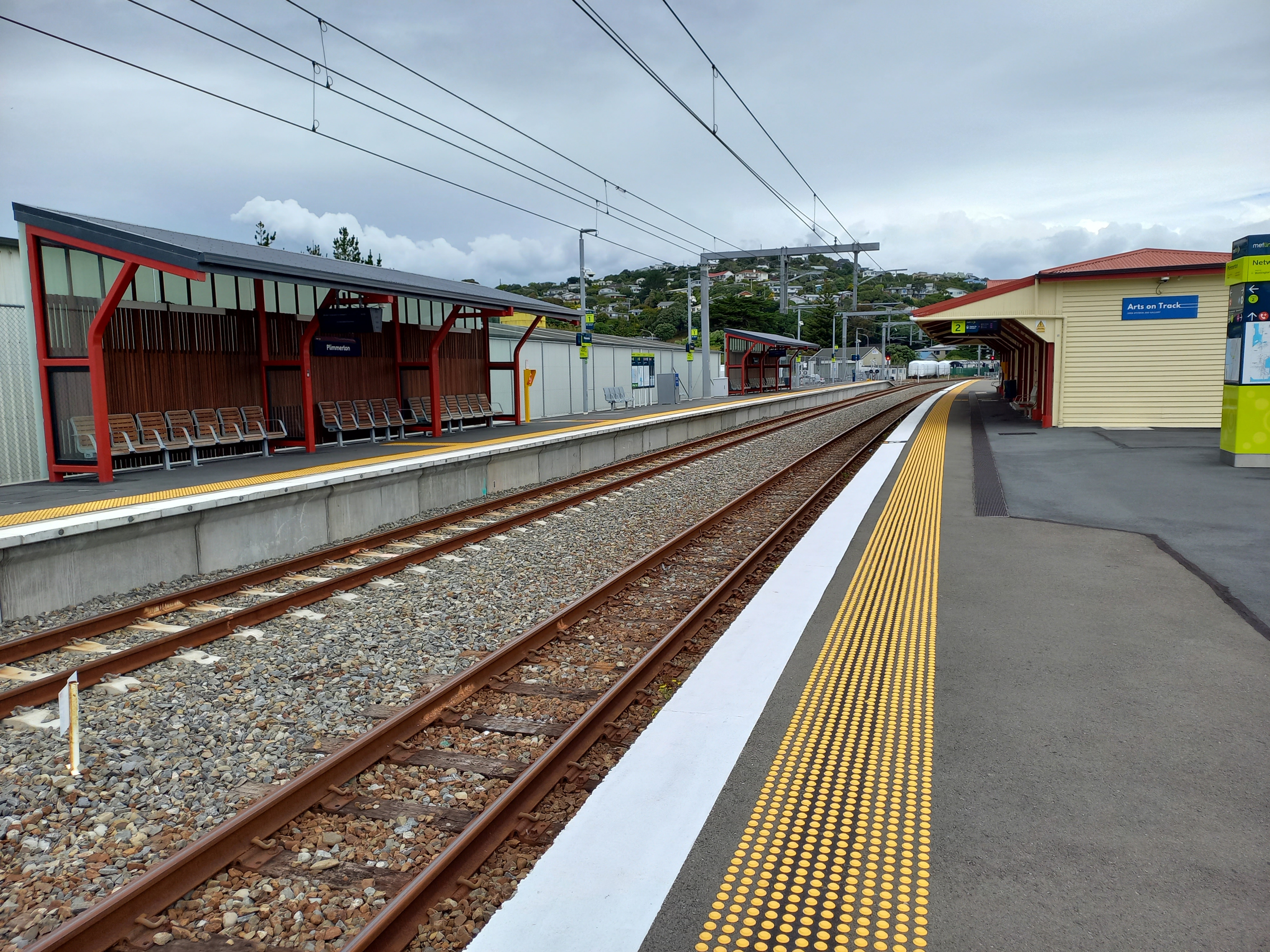
- Plimmerton railway station in 2025

General information
- Location: Steyne Avenue, Plimmerton, Porirua, New Zealand
- Coordinates: 41°05′0″S 174°52′1″E
- System: Metlink suburban rail
- Owner: Greater Wellington Regional Council (building), KiwiRail (platform)
- Line: North Island Main Trunk
- Platforms: Island Platform
- Tracks: Mainline (2)
- Connections: Mainline Steam Siding

Construction
- Structure type: Station Building
- Parking: Yes
- Cycle facilities: Yes

Other information
- Classification: RHTNZ Category B building

History
- Opened: 2 October 1885
- Closed: Ticket office closed October 1989 (reopened October 2010)
- Rebuilt: February 1940 (restored October 2010) 2022 (existing platforms shortened, one of the pedestrian crossings removed and 3rd Platforms added)
- Electrified: 24 July 1940

Services
Preceding station	Transdev Wellington	Following station
Pukerua Bay towards Waikanae	Kāpiti Line	Mana towards Wellington
Location

Plimmerton railway station is on the North Island Main Trunk Railway (NIMT) in Plimmerton, Porirua, New Zealand, and is part of Wellington's Metlink suburban rail network operated by Transdev Wellington. It is double tracked around a long island platform, with subway access from Steyne Avenue and Plimmerton Domain's Park and Ride to the north, and a controlled crossing to Steyne Avenue and Mainline Steam at the south end of the platform. Mainline Steam, a heritage steam train restorer and operator, is located in the former goods yard next to the station.

== Services ==
Plimmerton is the third station north of Porirua on the Kāpiti Line for commuter trains operated by Transdev Wellington under the Metlink brand contracted to the Greater Wellington Regional Council. Services between Wellington and Porirua or Waikanae are operated by electric multiple units of the FT/FP class (Matangi). Two diesel-hauled carriage trains, the Capital Connection and the Northern Explorer, pass through the station but do not stop.

All suburban services running between Wellington and Plimmerton or Waikanae stop at Plimmerton. Off-peak trains stop at all stations between Wellington and Waikanae. During peak periods, some trains from Wellington that stop at all stations may terminate at Porirua and return to Wellington while a number of peak services run express or non-stop between Wellington and Porirua before stopping at all stations from Porirua to Waikanae. Plimmerton is the northern terminus for some peak period trains which terminate at Plimmerton and return to Wellington.

Travel times by train are approximately thirty-one minutes to Waikanae, eight minutes to Porirua, twenty-nine minutes to Wellington for trains stopping at all stations, and twenty-five minutes for express trains that do not stop between Porirua and Wellington.

Trains run every twenty minutes during daytime off-peak hours, more frequently during peak periods, and less frequently at night. Before July 2018, off-peak passenger train services between Wellington and Waikanae ran every thirty minutes but were increased to one every twenty minutes from 15 July 2018.

Mack's Track, a railway model specialist, operates a destination store, ticket agency and kiosk inside the station, and maintains a waiting room. Bicycle racks and lockers are also provided on the platform. A park and ride car park adjoining the station is located at Plimmerton Domain.

In 2021 upgrading of the Plimmerton railway station by addition of a train loop/turnback facility started, to be completed by 2023. Some trains will then turn around at Plimmerton rather than Porirua thus increasing the peak capacity of the line by reducing the number of passengers on trains to Waikanae.

== History ==
The rail corridor through Plimmerton was built by the Wellington and Manawatu Railway Company (WMR). The line reached Plimmerton in 1885 and proved to be a very popular beach destination for weekend visitors from Wellington who would ride the train to Plimmerton to "take the waters".

THe WMR built Plimmerton House a two-story boarding house behind the station in the 1890s "to entice visitors there".

The original station building constructed in 1885 was on the west side of the line, and was replaced with the current station in 1940 when double tracking was completed. There were also several other tracks and a goods shed. For many years, the new station also served as a venue for the community. The station was staffed until 1989 and still houses a control panel used for access for Mainline Steam's trains and other rail operations.

The station building was identified as being of special importance under the Village Strategy Plan put together by the Plimmerton Residents' Association (PRA) as a part of Porirua City Council's Village Planning Programme.

== Station building reopening ==
The station building was closed to the public from October 1989. Faced with the threat of demolition in 2004, the local community and Porirua City Council sought to organise the support needed to repair the empty station rather than have it replaced by minimalist shelters. Funding and implementing the repairs was not resolved until 2009, when Tranz Metro and the PRA signed a Community Rail Partnership (CRP) to govern the restoration and future use of the station building, and Tranz Metro and Mack's Track (a model railway retailer) signed an Agreement to Lease (ATL) the building if it was made good. With the participation of other stakeholders, including Porirua City Council and the Rail Heritage Trust of New Zealand, this CRP created a framework for repairs and other work to commence, and the ATL provided for a tenant to occupy the building on an ongoing basis once the project was finished.

An important part of this successful small scale transit-oriented development was Mack's Track occupying the station building when finished and providing a ticket agency, cafe and destination store as well as acting as a "Station Master" with the PRA for a public waiting room and other facilities for train passengers and the local community.

The restored station building was reopened on 10 October 2010, commemorating the 125th anniversary of trains to Plimmerton, 70 years since the opening of the existing station building and electrification of the line and 21 years since the station building had been closed to the public.

The Plimmerton Station Restoration Project has been applauded for its successful partnering of the community with the rail operator and the local authority to enable the preservation of local heritage while enhancing the operation of a modern rail transit system. The project received a Rail Heritage Trust of New Zealand Restoration Award in 2011, being recognised as "a model for other station restorations throughout the country."
