= Waikanae railway station =

Railway station in New Zealand

Waikanae
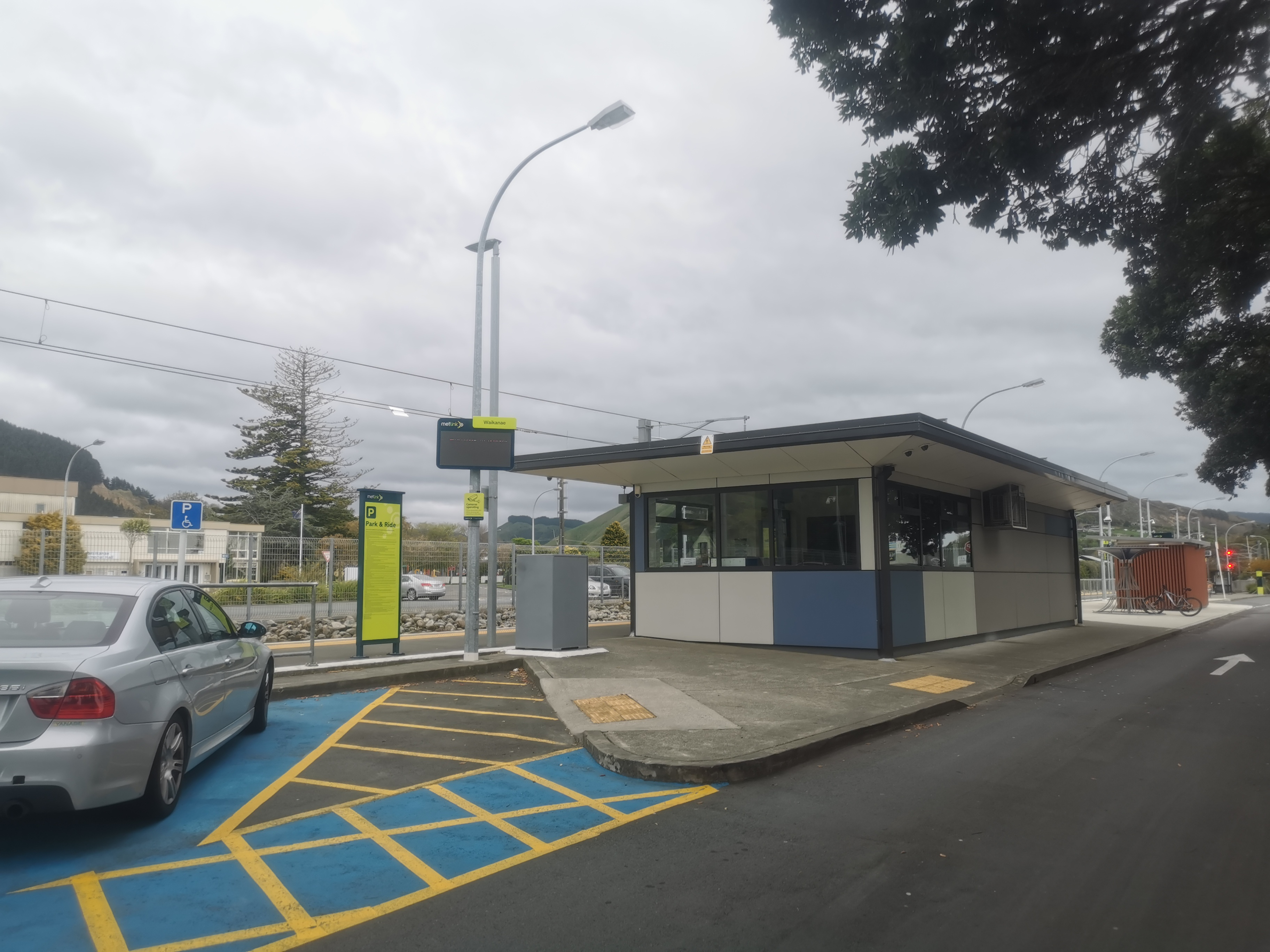
- Waikanae station ticket office

General information
- Location: Pehi Kupa Street, Waikanae, New Zealand
- Coordinates: 40°52′36″S 175°03′58″E
- Elevation: 31 m (102 ft)
- System: Metlink suburban rail
- Owner: Greater Wellington Regional Council
- Line: North Island Main Trunk
- Distance: Wellington 55.43 km (34.44 mi)
- Platforms: Single
- Tracks: Mainline (1)

Construction
- Parking: Yes

Other information
- Fare zone: 10

History
- Opened: 2 August 1886
- Rebuilt: June 2010 - February 2011
- Electrified: 20 February 2011

Services
Preceding station	Transdev Wellington	Following station
Terminus	Kāpiti Line	Paraparaumu towards Wellington
Preceding station	KiwiRail	Following station
Ōtaki towards Palmerston North	Capital Connection	Paraparaumu towards Wellington

Historic railways
Preceding station	Historical railways	Following station
Hadfield; Line open, station closed 3 mi (4.8 km)	North Island Main Trunk; KiwiRail	Otaihanga; Line open, station closed 2 mi (3.2 km)
Location

Waikanae railway station in Waikanae on the Kāpiti Coast, New Zealand, is the terminal station on the Kāpiti Line for Metlink's electric multiple unit commuter trains from Wellington. The railway is part of the North Island Main Trunk line that connects Wellington and Auckland.

== Services ==
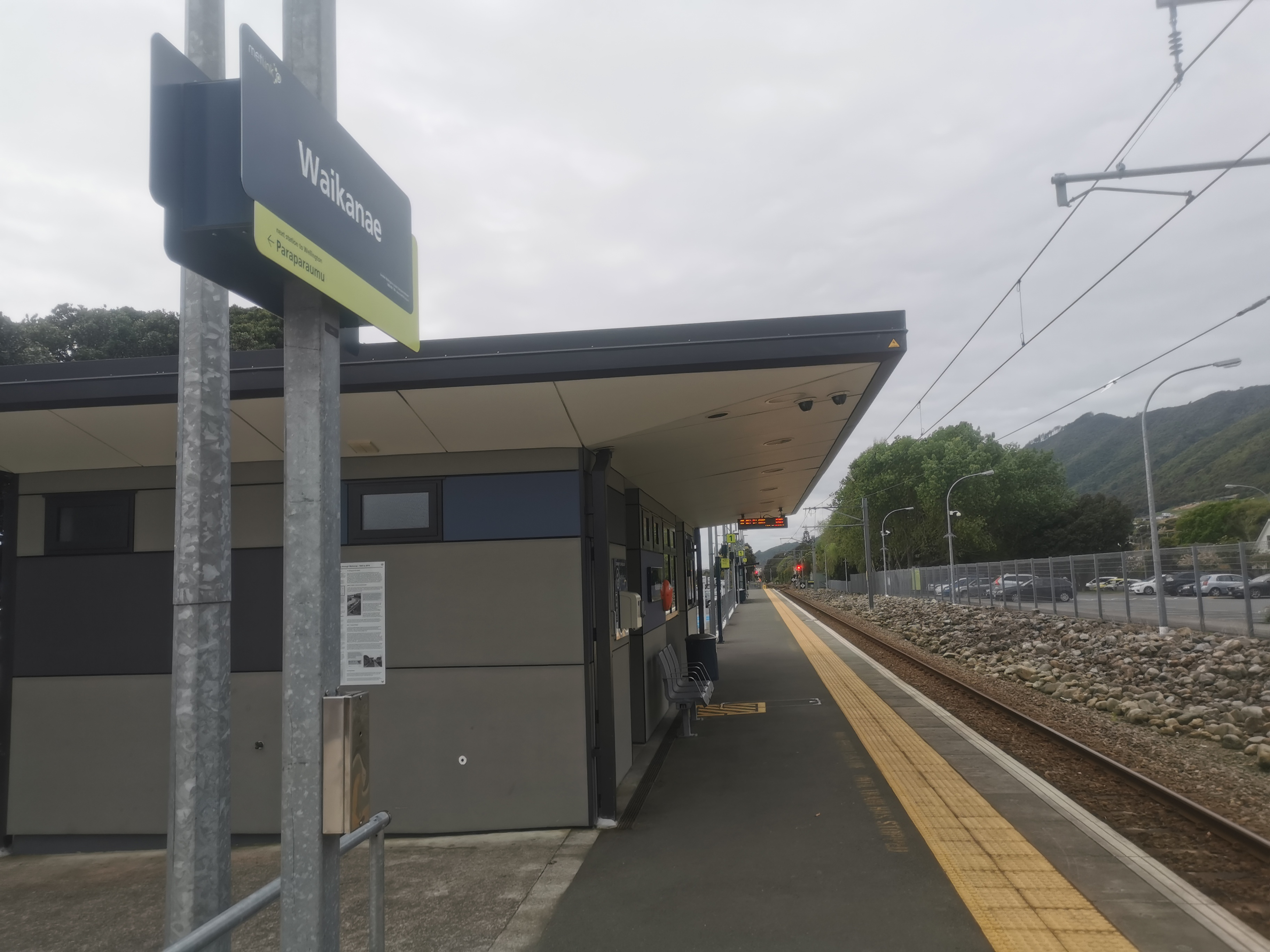
Waikanae Railway Station 2021

Waikanae is the northern terminal for Kāpiti Line commuter trains operated by Transdev Wellington under the Metlink brand operating between Wellington and Porirua or Waikanae. Services are operated by electric multiple units of the FT/FP class (Matangi). Two diesel-hauled carriage trains, the Capital Connection and the Northern Explorer, pass through the station. The Capital Connection stops at Waikanae but the Northern Explorer does not. The Capital Connection is to be replaced by the New Zealand BEMU class electric multiple unit from 2030.

Travel times by train are thirty-nine minutes to Porirua and one hour to Wellington for trains that stop at all stations and fifty-seven minutes for express trains that do not stop between Porirua and Wellington. Trains run every twenty minutes during daytime off-peak hours, more frequently during peak periods, and less frequently at night. Before July 2018, off-peak passenger train services between Wellington and Waikanae ran every thirty minutes but were increased to one every twenty minutes from 15 July 2018. Off-peak trains stop at all stations between Wellington and Waikanae. During peak periods, some trains from Wellington that stop at all stations may terminate at Porirua and return to Wellington while a number of peak services run express or non-stop between Wellington and Porirua before stopping at all stations from Porirua to Waikanae.

The following Metlink bus routes: 280: Waikanae Beach, 281: Waikanae East, 290: Ōtaki Beach, and 285: Kapiti Commuter service to Wellington (commercially operated), serve Waikanae station. There is also the twice-weekly service (291/404) to Levin run in conjunction with Horizons District Council.

== Facilities ==
There is a ticket office where people can buy tickets from the ticket office also has a waiting area for passengers to wait for their train to arrive, on the platform there is a RTI (real time information) screen showing the time of arrival for the next Metlink train and multiple outside shelters. In 2020 new toilet facilities were built and are open 24 hours a day every day, previously the toilets in the ticket office were available only when the ticket office building was open, however the toilets in the ticket office are still available to use for commuters there is also park and ride facilities located in Pehi Pupa street opposite the platform and some by the shopping area in Waikanae. There is also bike parking located by the ticket office building and by the bus shelter.

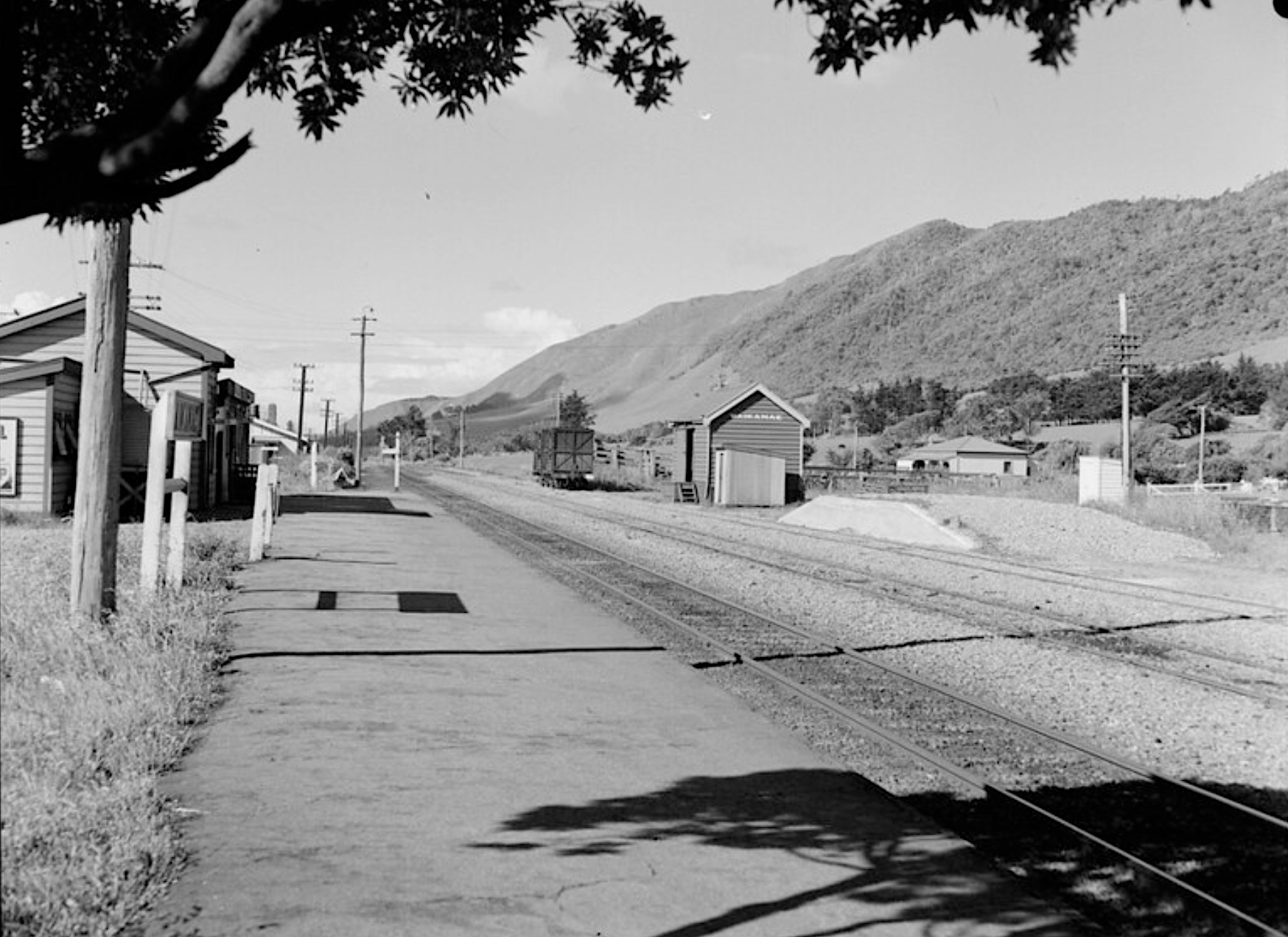
Waikanae station 1949

== History ==
The station was opened in 1886, and was on the Wellington-Manawatu Line from Wellington to Longburn, built by the Wellington and Manawatu Railway Company (WMR) and provided both passenger and freight services. The Waikanae to Ōtaki contract, for 8 mi (13 km) to the north, was let to Messrs Wilkie and Wilson. To the south, Alexander and Macfarlane, of Whanganui had the last contract to be let, the 10 mi (16 km) Paikakariki and Waikanae section. The last spike ceremony was performed on 3 November 1886 at Otaihanga. The first through train from Wellington to Palmerston North ran on 30 November 1886. Waikanae was in the December 1886 timetable as a flag station. The railway has been part of the North Island Main Trunk (connecting Wellington and Auckland) since 1908.

A goods shed was built in 1895 and rebuilt in 1979. The platform was extended in 1897 and the station was improved in 1909, so that by 1911 it had a shelter shed, platform, cart approach, 25 ft (7.6 m) by 12 ft (3.7 m) goods shed, loading bank, cattle and sheep yards and a passing loop for 59 wagons (extended in 1940 to 90 wagons). From 1908 a tablet was used. A ladies waiting room was added in 1929, detached from the station building, for £214.14.6. Electric lights replaced oil at about the same time. Railway houses were built in 1892, 1928, 1930 and two in 1940. A new 24 ft (7.3 m) by 12 ft (3.7 m) station building, with an office, signal control panel, and accommodation for parcels was built by NZR staff, slightly to the south of the existing building, in 1968. The stockyards were removed in 1965. The station closed to goods traffic on 3 May 1986.

=== Renovation of the Station Building ===
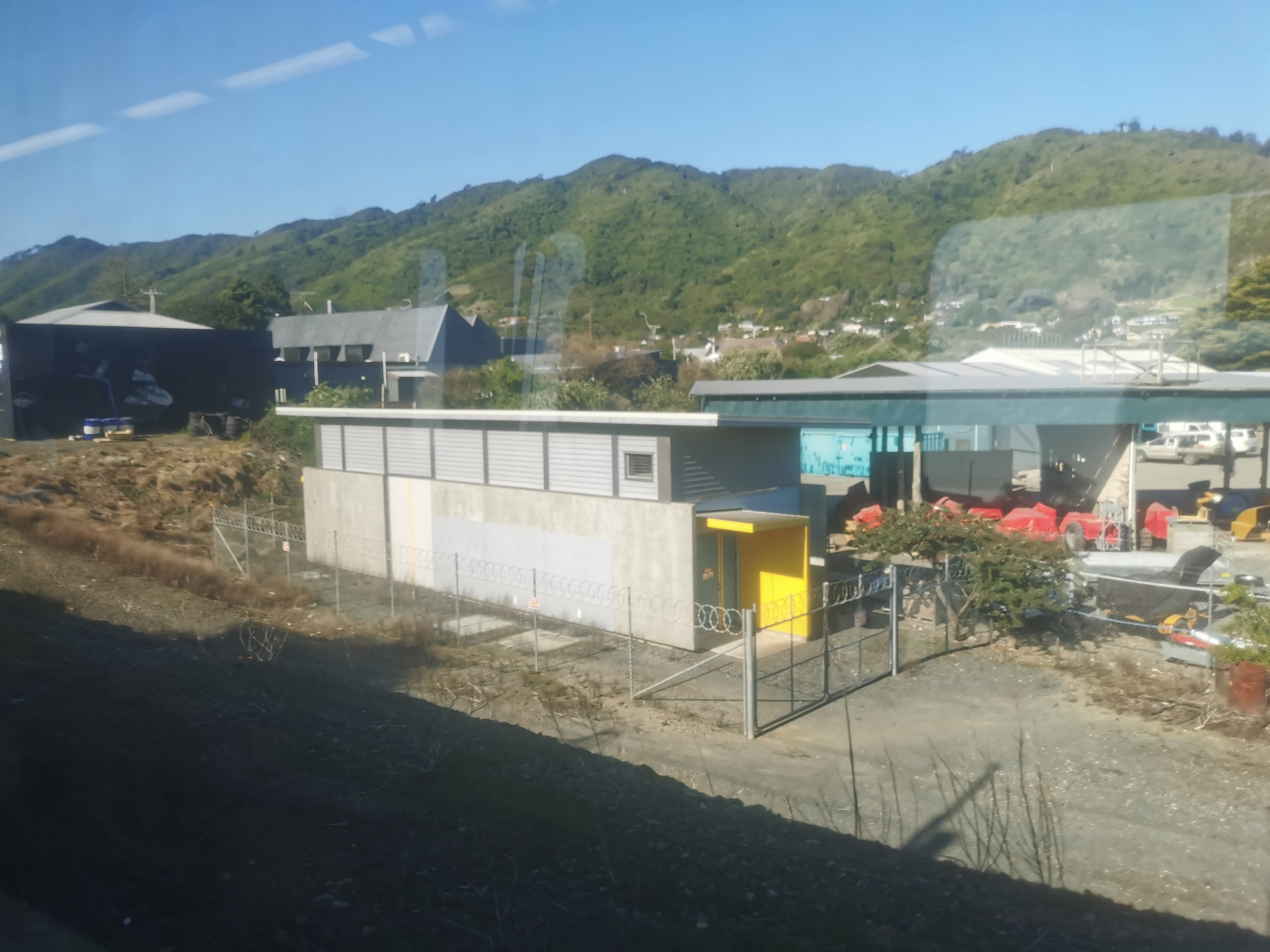
Waikanae Substation

In late 2010 the old 1960s station building was removed and in its place a brand new station building costing $1millon was built it features a ticket office, a waiting area, toilets and some history of the train station

=== Electrification ===
The Wellington suburban electrified commuter service was extended from Paraparaumu to Waikanae on 20 February 2011. The new service was opened with ceremony on 19 February at Waikanae. Minister of Transport Steven Joyce and Ōtaki MP Nathan Guy drove the last spike. Guy's great-grandfather was chairman of the WMR when the last spike was driven in 1886. The ceremony was marked by protests against the proposed Kapiti Expressway, and Ōtaki-based list MP Darren Hughes was cheered for his opposition to the project in favour of rail investment.

The Paraparaumu and Waikanae stations were upgraded at a cost of more than $1 million each in 2010–2011. Upgrading of the original Waikanae station, rather than moving it south of Elizabeth Street or providing a road underpass, was criticised locally on the grounds that frequent closing of the Elizabeth Street level crossing south of the station would increase traffic congestion in Waikanae.

=== Waikanae River bridge ===
Almost a kilometre south of the station the NIMT crosses the Waikanae River. The original bridge was a 3-span timber truss. In 1925 a fence of old rails was built to protect the bridge, backed by fifteen old square iron tanks (sent from East Town), filled with river bed stones. By 1938 the bridge had been rebuilt in steel and concrete.

=== Waikanae State Highway 1 rail underpass ===
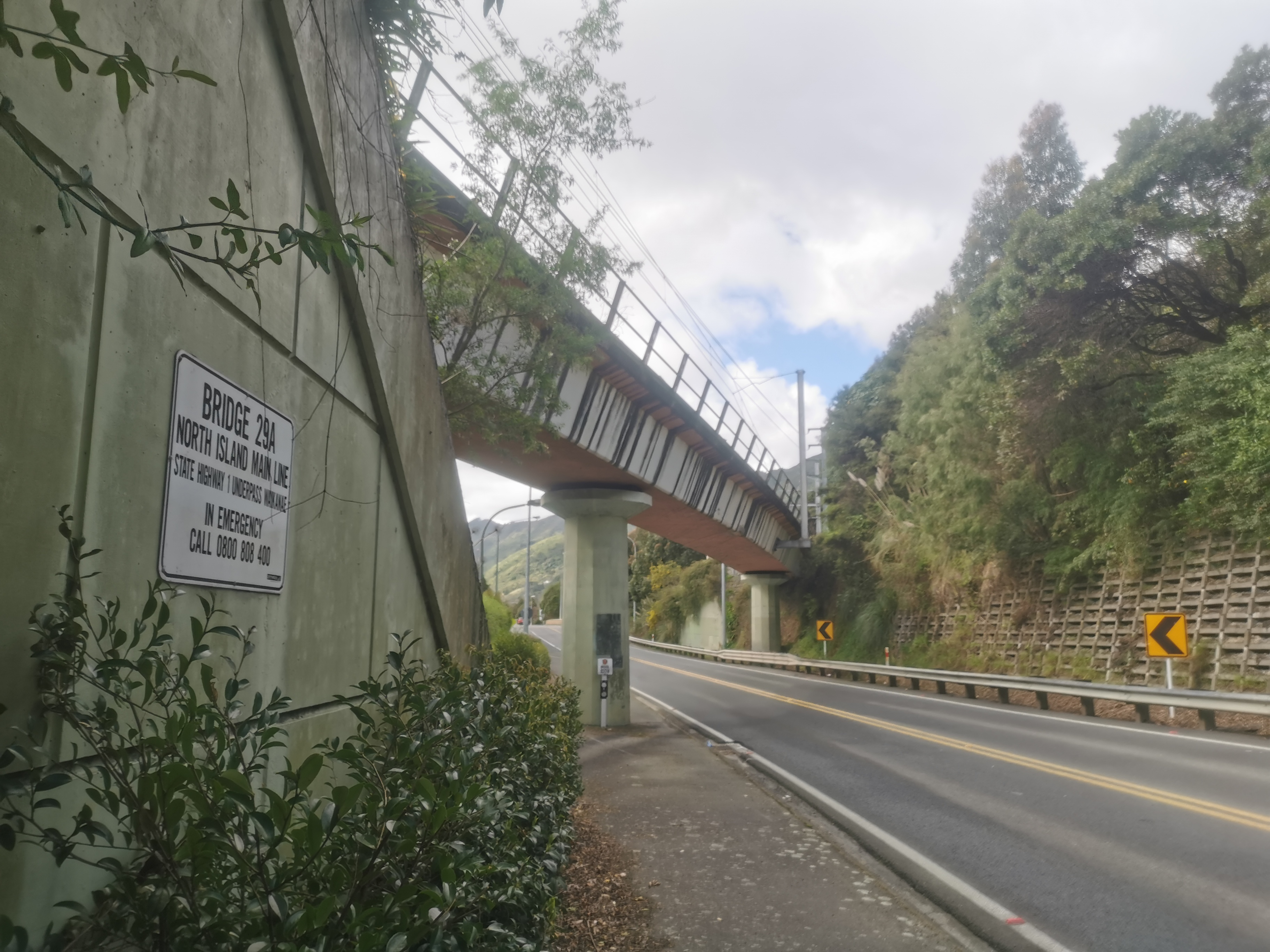
Waikanae State Highway 1 Rail Underpass

There is an underpass about a kilometre south of the railway station built in the 1960s for passenger trains and freight trains to pass over the Old State Highway 1.

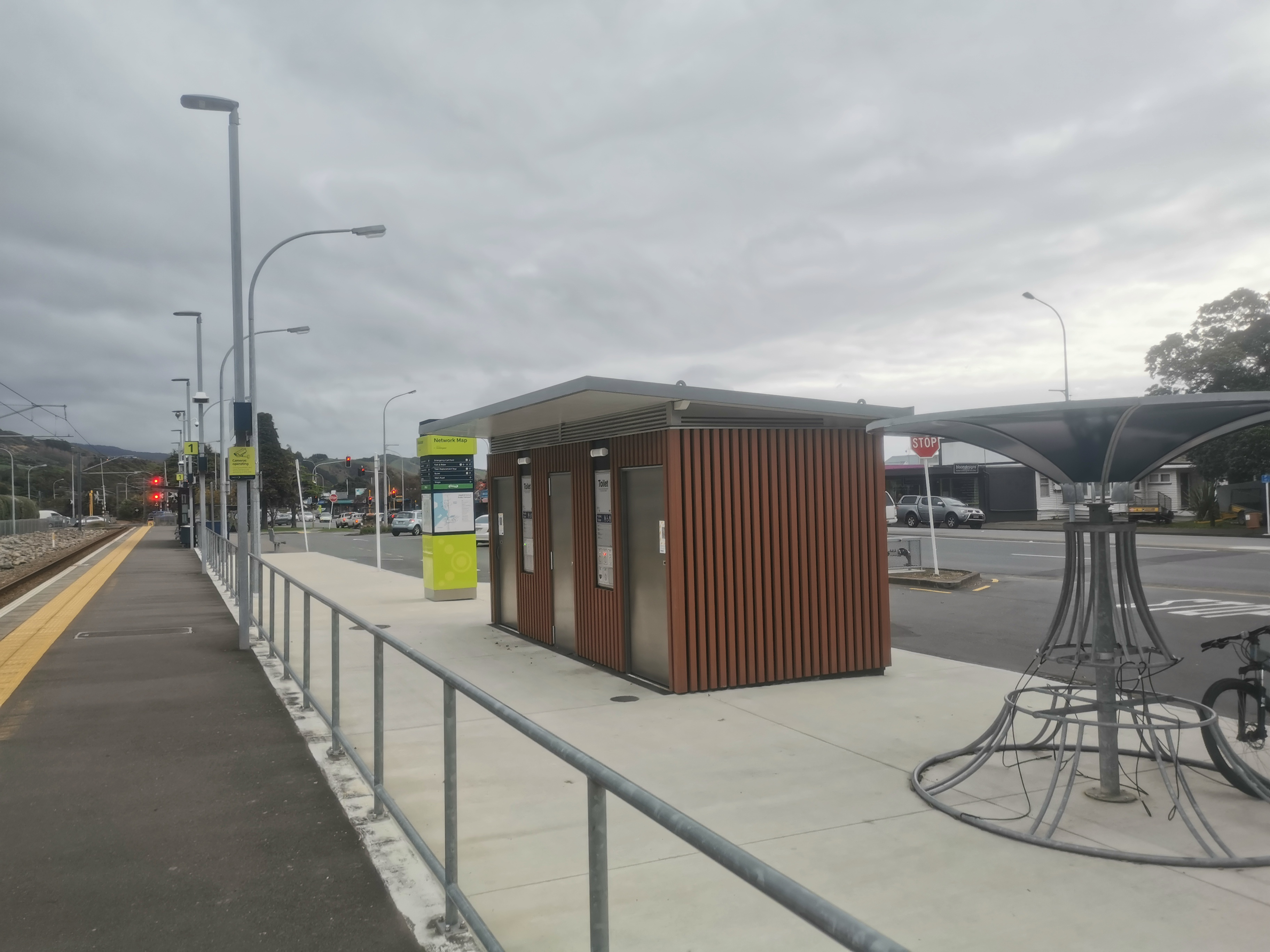
Waikanae Railway Exeloo Toilets
