= Crofton Downs =

Suburb of Wellington City, New Zealand

- Suburb
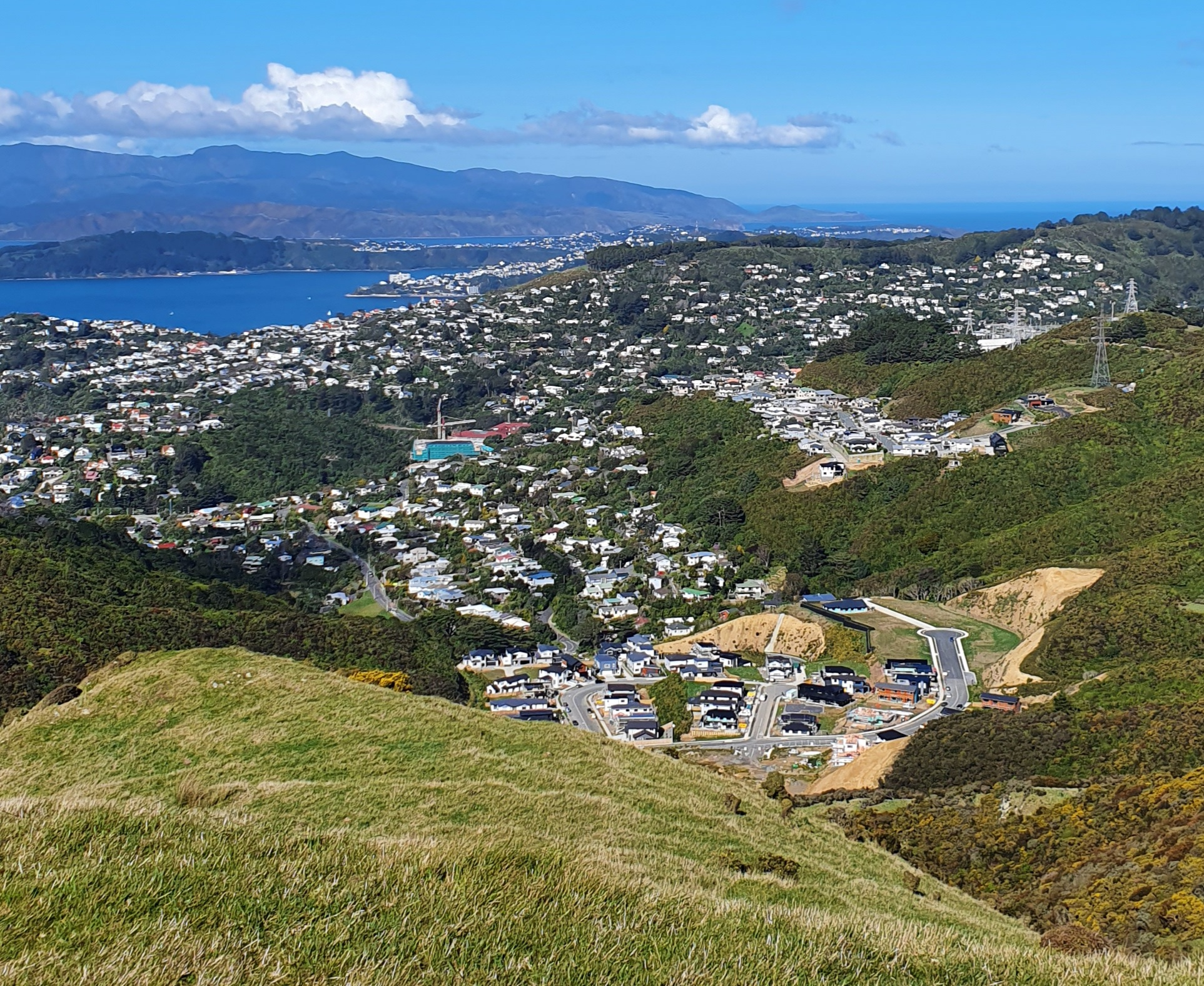
- Interactive map of Crofton Downs
- Coordinates: 41.257°S 174.764°E
- Country: New Zealand
- City: Wellington
- Local authority: Wellington City Council
- Electoral ward: Wharangi/Onslow-Western; Te Whanganui-a-Tara Māori Ward

Area
  - Land: 157 ha (390 acres)

Population (June 2025)
  - Total: 2,040
  - Density: 1,300/km^{2} (3,370/sq mi)
- Railway stations: Crofton Downs
- Airports: nsp
- Hospitals: Bowen Hospital (private)

| | Mount Kaukau |
| Wilton | Crofton Downs | Ngaio |
| | Kaiwharawhara |

Crofton Downs is an inner suburb of Wellington, the capital city of New Zealand. It is situated between Ngaio to the northeast, Wilton to the south-west, and Wadestown to the south. Its border runs on the Korimako Stream that flows south into the Kaiwharawhara Stream and then flows down the Ngaio Gorge into Wellington Harbour.

== History and etymology ==
The area was before 1870 was called Upper Kaiwarra (a corruption of Kaiwharawhara), after 1870 Crofton (including neighbouring Ngaio). In 1908 was renamed Ngaio, then in 1950s the western side of Ngaio became Crofton Downs. Crofton Downs taking its name from a house built in the 1857 by then Premier, William Fox. Crofton House, which was likely named after his wife's birthplace of Crofton in Wiltshire, England, still stands today and is at 21 Kenya Street.

Many of the street names in the suburb such as Winston Street, Downing Street and Chartwell Drive are a tribute to the life of former British prime minister Sir Winston Churchill; Chartwell was Churchill's country home. Admiralty Street comes from 'First Lord of the Admiralty' which is appointed by the UK Prime Minister. Chequers Way is from Chequers the official residence of the UK Prime Minister. Doris Gordon Crescent is named after the New Zealand doctor who, as a child, resided nearby.

== Demographics ==
Crofton Downs statistical area covers 1.57 km^{2} (0.61 sq mi). It had an estimated population of 2,040 as of June 2025, with a population density of 1,299 people per km^{2}.

Historical population
| Year | Pop. | ±% p.a. |
|---|---|---|
| 2006 | 1,410 | — |
| 2013 | 1,548 | +1.34% |
| 2018 | 1,641 | +1.17% |
| 2023 | 1,968 | +3.70% |
The 2006 population is for a smaller area of 1.31 km^{2}. Source:

Crofton Downs had a population of 1,968 in the 2023 New Zealand census, an increase of 327 people (19.9%) since the 2018 census, and an increase of 420 people (27.1%) since the 2013 census. There were 900 males, 1,035 females, and 33 people of other genders in 747 dwellings. 6.4% of people identified as LGBTIQ+. The median age was 40.5 years (compared with 38.1 years nationally). There were 342 people (17.4%) aged under 15 years, 336 (17.1%) aged 15 to 29, 972 (49.4%) aged 30 to 64, and 321 (16.3%) aged 65 or older.

People could identify as more than one ethnicity. The results were 78.8% European (Pākehā); 7.8% Māori; 2.4% Pasifika; 18.6% Asian; 3.2% Middle Eastern, Latin American and African New Zealanders (MELAA); and 2.0% other, which includes people giving their ethnicity as "New Zealander". English was spoken by 97.3%, Māori by 2.0%, Samoan by 0.8%, and other languages by 23.6%. No language could be spoken by 1.7% (e.g. too young to talk). New Zealand Sign Language was known by 0.6%. The percentage of people born overseas was 37.5, compared with 28.8% nationally.

Religious affiliations were 27.3% Christian, 2.9% Hindu, 1.5% Islam, 0.3% Māori religious beliefs, 2.3% Buddhist, 0.3% New Age, 0.3% Jewish, and 2.1% other religions. People who answered that they had no religion were 58.5%, and 4.7% of people did not answer the census question.

Of those at least 15 years old, 930 (57.2%) people had a bachelor's or higher degree, 540 (33.2%) had a post-high school certificate or diploma, and 165 (10.1%) people exclusively held high school qualifications. The median income was $66,300, compared with $41,500 nationally. 519 people (31.9%) earned over $100,000 compared to 12.1% nationally. The employment status of those at least 15 was 960 (59.0%) full-time, 198 (12.2%) part-time, and 30 (1.8%) unemployed.

== Local facilities ==
Crofton Downs has its own railway station (with coffee shop) on the Johnsonville Line for commuters to Wellington Station to the south and going to Ngaio, Khandallah and Johnsonville to the north.

Near the station on Churchill Drive is Churchill Drive Shopping Centre with a supermarket, cafe, pharmacy and a hairdresser. Next door is a Mitre 10 DIY hardware store. The adjacent petrol station was closed in late 2022. The veterinary clinic which was part of the supermarket complex has moved to nearby Thatcher Crescent.

The Countdown supermarket was expanded in 2013 and now covers an area of 3,400 m^{2}.

=== Bowen Hospital ===
Bowen Hospital is run by a private charitable trust. Now located on Churchill Drive on the southern part of Crofton Downs, it was established on Bowen Street opposite Parliament in 1912. The old building was closed in 1965 and it moved here.

A BUPA retirement village opened in Crofton Downs next to Bowen Hospital in 2022.

== Open space and parks ==
Crofton Downs is surrounded by parks and reserves. To the west, north-west and north it is encircled by the city council-owned Skyline walkway park, the park featuring 'the crows nest' a popular peak at 385m high. The access is from the Silversky Walkway and vehicles from Chartwell drive and Chartwell reserve. Huntleigh Park forms the northern edge of Crofton Downs with neighbouring Ngaio, Trelissick Park runs to the east of the train station and line and Otari-Wilton's Bush to the south east.

=== Huntleigh Park ===
Huntleigh Park provides a backup community water facility in case an emergency event such as an earthquake disrupts supplies.

Huntleigh Guide Centre in Huntleigh park off Silverstream Road was a community facility seated up to 100 people. The Guide Centre was purchased by Wellington City Council and the land was added to the Outer Green Belt in 2024, following the demolishment of the building. The seven-hectare site is now being developed as a public reserve, with plans for walking tracks, picnic areas and nature play. The council also plans to restore native vegetation and stream side areas, helping protect the site's significant natural areas and biodiversity.

== Education ==
=== School enrolment zone ===
Crofton Downs is within the enrolment zones for Wellington Girls' College, Onslow College, St Oran's College and Raroa Normal Intermediate.

=== Primary school ===
Crofton Downs Primary school is a Decile 10 coeducational contributing state school catering to years 1 to 6. Formerly called Chartwell School, the school was opened in 1970. Its name was changed to Crofton Downs Primary school in 2008 as the surrounding area is now more commonly referred to as Crofton Downs rather than Chartwell. It had a roll of 158 as of July 2026.

== Transport ==
The suburb is served by the Johnsonville Branch commuter railway which connects it to the central city and Johnsonville. It is one stop to Wellington Central Station, and the journey takes 9 minutes. In addition, on weekdays the number 22 bus route runs between Johnsonville and Wellington with stops in Crofton Downs.

== Predator Free Crofton Downs ==
Crofton Downs was the first New Zealand Suburb to be declared predator-free after local community group, Predator Free Crofton Downs, arranged stoat and rat traps for over 200 households throughout the suburb. Since its inception in 2014, the community model has inspired other communities throughout New Zealand to start their own predator free groups.
