= Kaiwharawhara Stream =

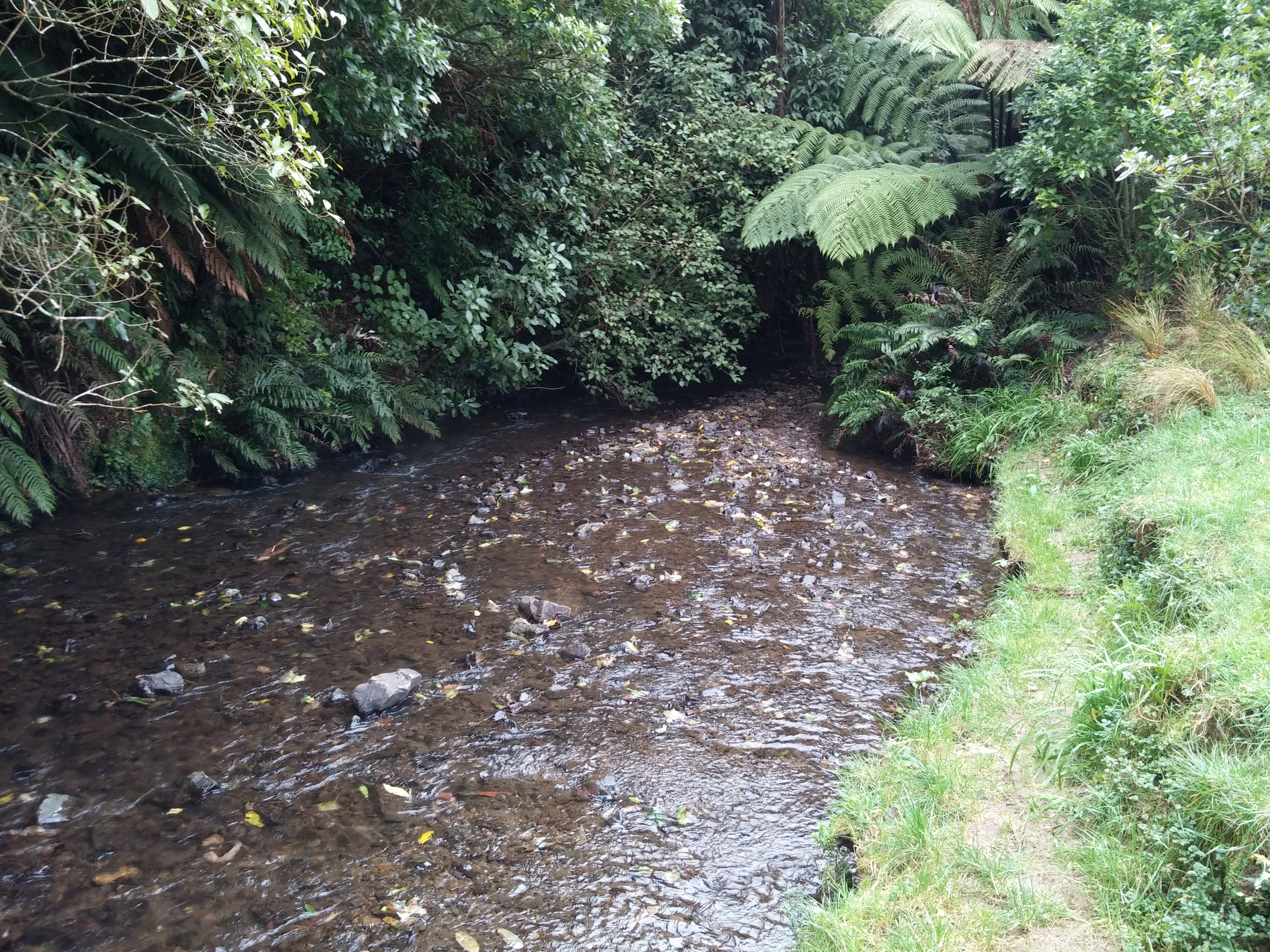
- The Kaiwharawhara Stream flowing through Ōtari-Wilton's Bush
- Route of the Kaiwharawhara Stream
- Mouth of the Kaiwharawhara Stream Kaiwharawhara Stream (North Island)
- Etymology: Māori meaning "food of the fruit of the Astelia"
- Native name: Kaiwharawhara (Māori)

Location
- Country: New Zealand
- Island: North Island
- Region: Wellington
- District: Wellington

Physical characteristics
- Source: Zealandia
  - coordinates: 41.31472°S 174.73695°E
  - elevation: 260 m (850 ft)
- Mouth: Wellington Harbour
  - location: Kaiwharawhara Point
  - coordinates: 41°15′44″S 174°47′28″E
  - elevation: Sea level
- Length: 10 km (6.2 mi)
- Basin size: 19 km^{2} (7.3 sq mi)

Basin features
- Progression: Kaiwharawhara Stream → Wellington Harbour → Cook Strait → Pacific Ocean
- Cities: Wellington
- Tributaries
  - left: Korimako Stream
- Waterbodies: Upper Karori Reservoir, Lower Karori Reservoir

The Kaiwharawhara Stream is a stream in the North Island of New Zealand – it flows through the northwestern part of New Zealand's capital, Wellington. Its headwaters lie within the suburb of Karori, and it passes through other suburbs and Ōtari-Wilton's Bush before passing through Ngaio Gorge to reach the western shore of Wellington Harbour in Kaiwharawhara near the terminal of the Interislander ferry. Part of its length runs roughly alongside the Johnsonville Branch railway, a branch line that once formed part of the North Island Main Trunk Railway – the latter now passes over the stream near its mouth.

Its main tributary is the Korimako Stream (which flows from Khandallah and Ngaio), though it is also fed by other tributaries, and its catchment covers roughly 19 square kilometres (7.3 mi^{2}). Much of this area consists of parkland and other reserves, though the water suffers from pollution in the form of stormwater and runoff associated with urban land-use.

The Kaiwharawhara name is from kai, the Māori word for food, and wharawhara, the edible fruit of Astelia Banksii. Until 1934 it was also known as Kaiwhara, Kaiwarawara, Kaiwarra, or Kaiwara.

The stream is piped along six sections, the main length being 846 m (2,776 ft), under the former landfill at Ian Galloway Park, from Zealandia (wildlife sanctuary) to Otari-Wilton's Bush.

In 1943, a 320 ft-long, 10 ft-diameter tunnel was built to divert the stream near its mouth at Kaiwharawhara. This was expected to improve flood protection, allow the Ngaio Gorge Road to be straightened and provide usable areas of land on both sides of the stream. Before it came into use, there was a suggestion that the tunnel would make a good air-raid shelter.

== Wildlife ==
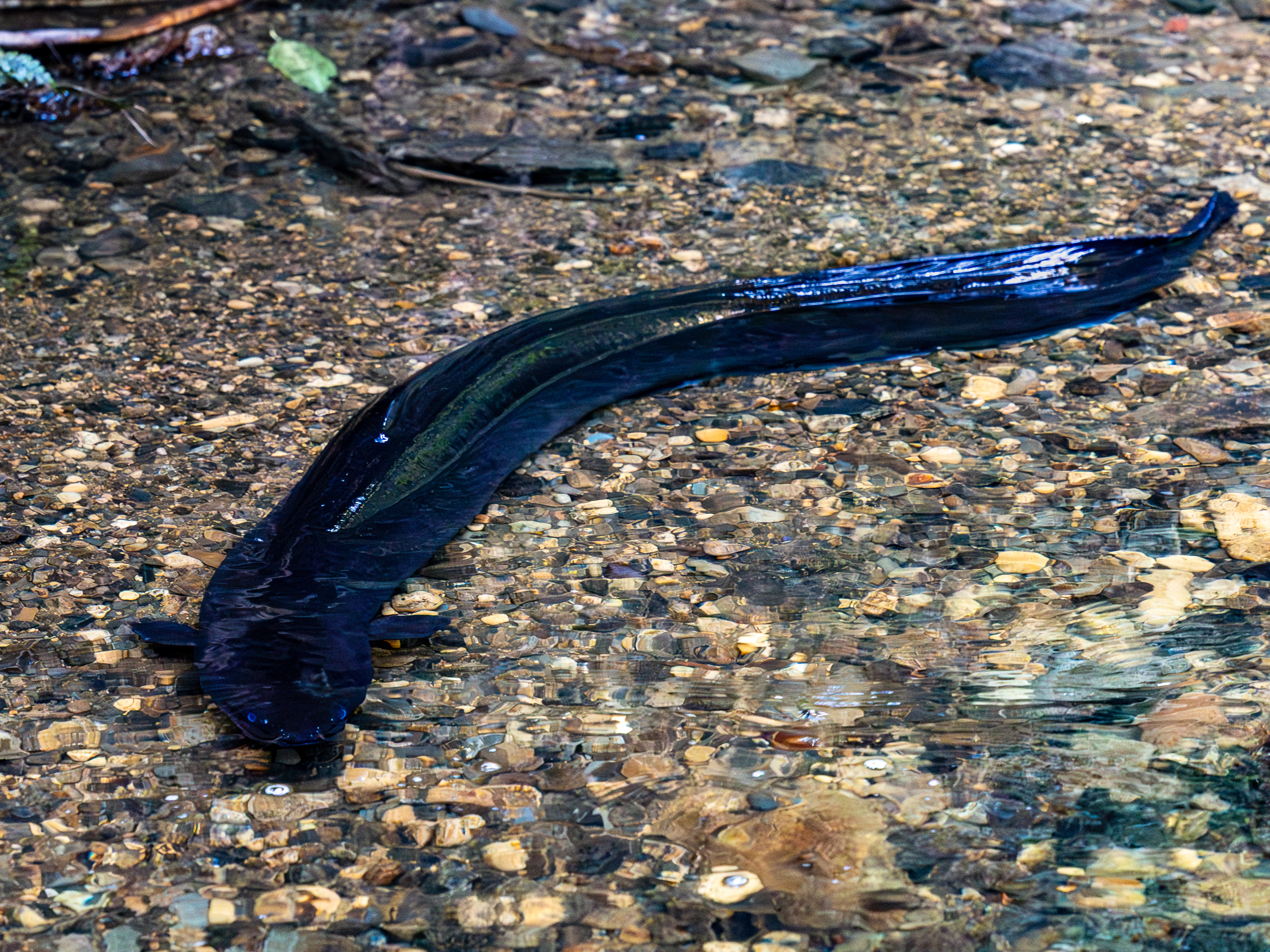
Longfin eel (Anguilla dieffenbachii) resting on stones in the Kaiwharawhara Stream

Fish in the stream include native shortfinned eel, longfin eel (ōrea), giant kōkopu, kōaro, banded kōkopu, īnanga, shortjaw kōkopu, common bully (toitoi), giant bully (tītarakura), bluegill bully, and redfin bully, as well as introduced goldfish, koi carp, perch and brown trout.

About 20% of the catchment is predominantly in native vegetation, which includes karaka, parviflora var. arborea (koromiko-taranga), makomako, melicytus ramiflorus (mahoe), phormium tenax (harakeke) plagianthus regius (manatu), pohutukawa, pteridium esculentum (aruhe), rangiora, taupata, toetoe and veronica.

Weeds in the valley include paraserianthes lophantha (brush wattle), cytisus scoparius (broom), fennel, gorse, pampas grass, rapeseed, tradescantia fluminensis and tree lupin.

== Pollution ==
As noted above, the stream passes through a disused landfill and has other pollution sources. The stream mouth has lead and zinc pollution. It is in the worst 25% of all sites across the country for E. coli and very likely degrading. A 5-year median for clarity is 3.34 m (11.0 ft) and likely improving. Similarly turbidity 5-year median is 1.26 NTU and improving, as is Total Nitrogen with a 5-year median of 1.2 mg/L. The 5-year median of Total Oxidised Nitrogen is 1 mg/L. Dissolved Inorganic Nitrogen has a 5-year median of 1.01 mg/L, Ammoniacal Nitrogen, 0.006 mg/L, Nitrate Nitrogen, 1 mg/L, Dissolved Reactive Phosphorus, 0.0355 mg/L, Total Phosphorus, 0.048 mg/L, MCI, 96.6, QMCI 1.76, ASPM, 2.130, Taxonomic richness, 26, EPT richness 31%.

== Walking tracks ==
Several tracks pass through the valley, including Te Araroa long-distance trail, which uses the Northern Walkway from Cummings Park via the Korimako valley and then a short length beside the Kaiwharawhara to Wadestown. The Sanctuary to Sea walkway uses most of the valley.

== See also ==
- List of rivers of Wellington Region
- List of rivers of New Zealand
