= 1969 New Zealand bravery awards =

The 1969 New Zealand bravery awards were announced via two Special Honours Lists dated 21 April and 17 September 1969, and recognised two people for acts of bravery in 1968 and 1969.

== George Medal (GM) ==
- Detective Inspector Edward Graham Perry – New Zealand Police; of Auckland.

In recognition of his outstanding bravery in the arrest of an armed and dangerous man at Whangārei on 11 July 1969.

== British Empire Medal (BEM) ==
Civil division, for gallantry

- Brian David Clark – 15 years of ago; of Ngaio.

For his great courage in going to the assistance of a Detective Constable who had been attacked by a man armed with a knife at the Khandallah Domain on Sunday, 15 December 1968.
