= Korimako Stream =

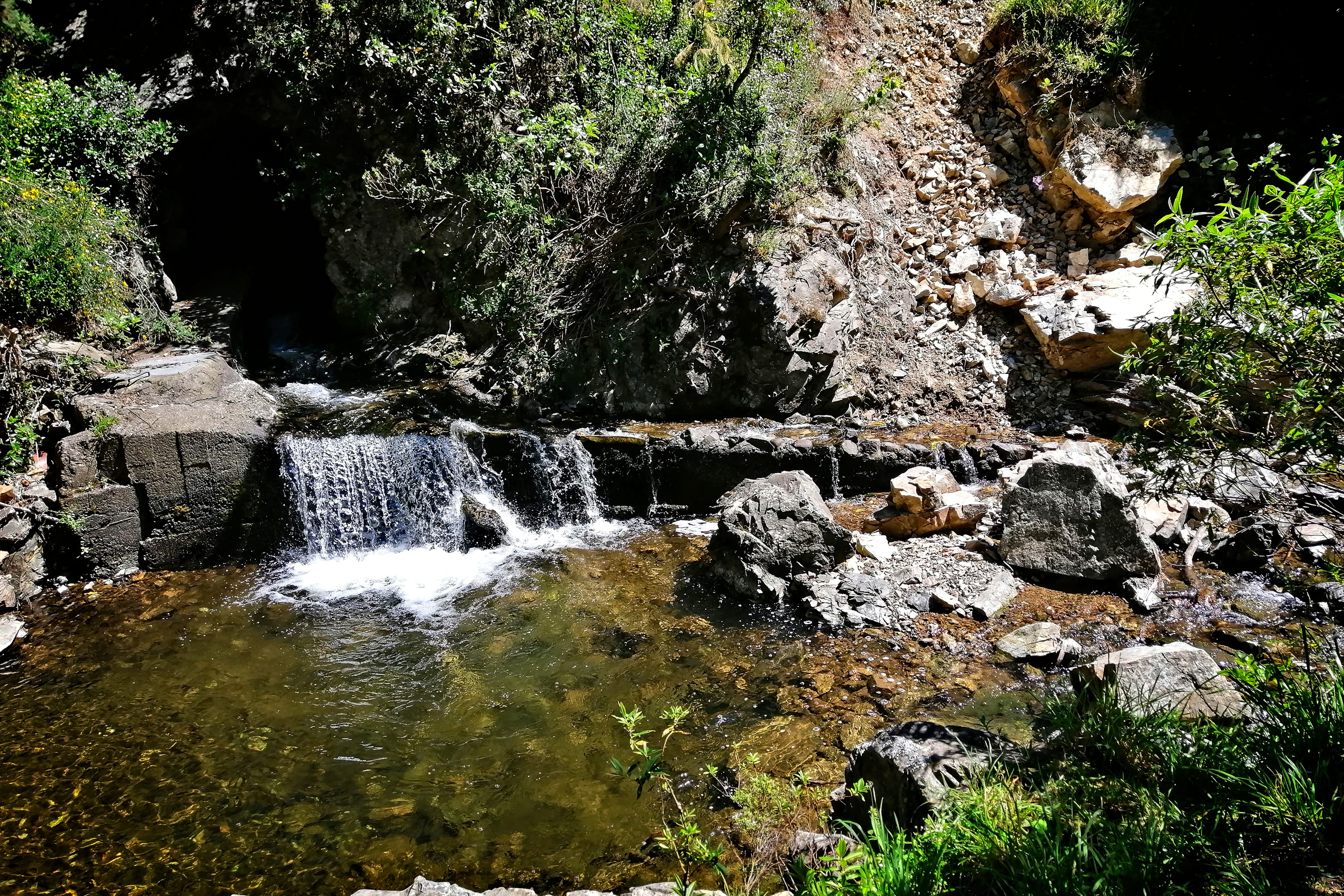
- Korimako Stream at the confluence with the Kaiwharawhara Stream.
- Route of the Korimako Stream
- Mouth of the Korimako Stream Korimako Stream (North Island)
- Native name: Korimako (Māori)

Location
- Country: New Zealand
- Island: North Island
- Region: Wellington
- District: Wellington

Physical characteristics
- Source: The Crows Nest
  - coordinates: 41.24316°S 174.75729°E
- Mouth: Kaiwharawhara Stream
  - location: Trelissick Park
  - coordinates: 41°15′35″S 174°46′09″E

Basin features
- Progression: Korimako Stream → Kaiwharawhara Stream → Wellington Harbour → Cook Strait → Pacific Ocean
- Cities: Wellington (Crofton Downs)

The Korimako Stream is a stream in the North Island of New Zealand, located in the northern suburbs of the national capital, Wellington. It rises in Khandallah and Ngaio and is the Kaiwharawhara Stream's main tributary. The two meet in the lower reaches of the Kaiwharawhara Stream in parkland.

== See also ==
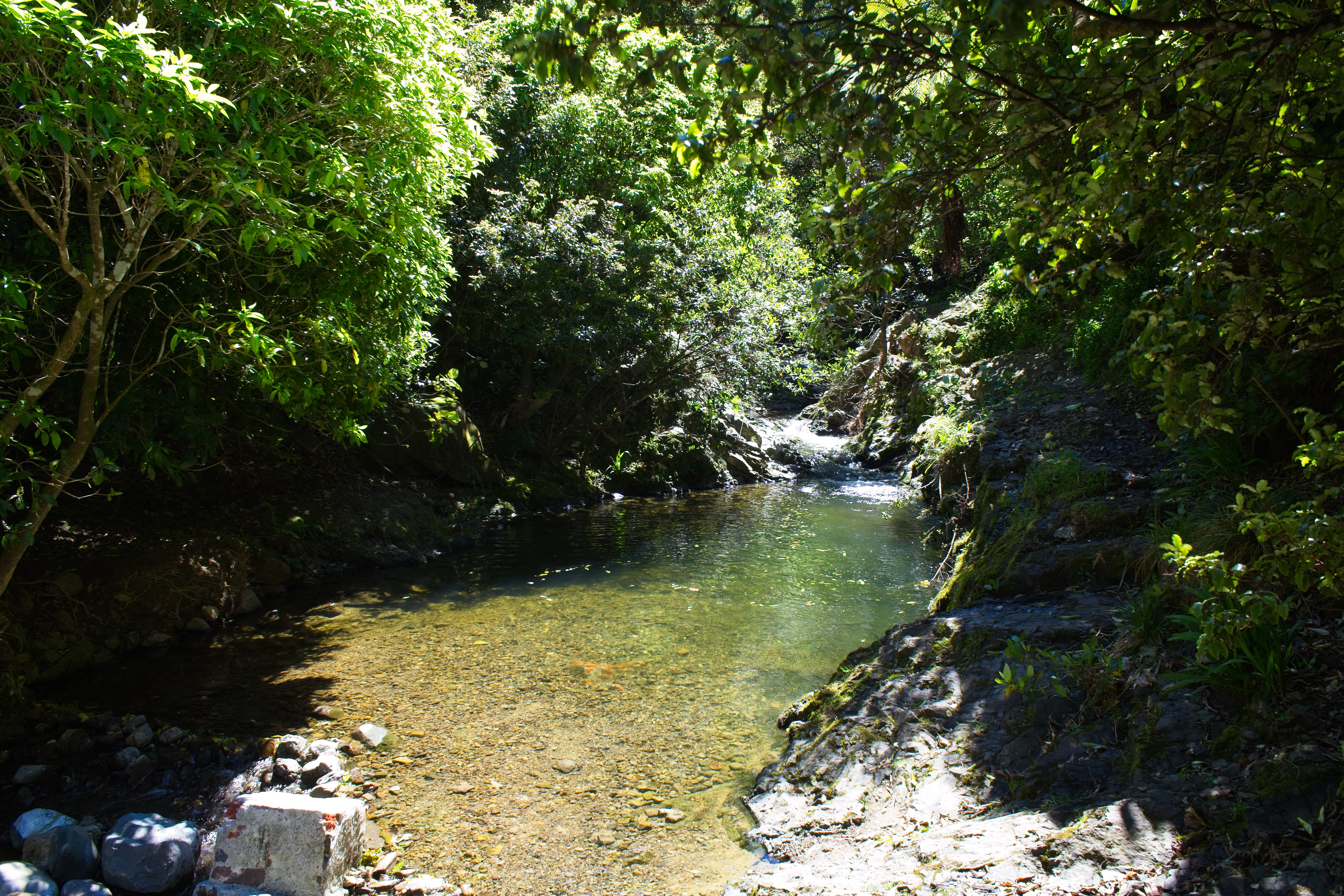
Korimako stream near Crofton Downs

- List of rivers of Wellington Region
- List of rivers of New Zealand
