= Ngaio Gorge =

Narrow valley in Wellington, New Zealand

Ngaio Gorge is a narrow valley in Wellington, New Zealand, that has been an important route into and out of Wellington since pre-European times. The steep hillsides are prone to slips. The lower end of Ngaio Gorge opens to Wellington Harbour at Kaiwharawhara, and the Kaiwharawhara Stream passes down through the gorge to the harbour. The gorge in pre-European times was covered in mixed broadleaf-podocarp forest. Tawa formed the main canopy, and rimu, kahikatea and northern rata were also present. The landscape changed after the forest was milled in the 19th century, but rehabilitation efforts, particularly in Trelissick Park on the south side of the gorge, have seen the establishment of mahoe, tawa, rewarewa, mataī, tōtara, kahikatea and tītoki.

== Māori use ==
Around 1825, prior to Europoean settlement, Ngāti Tama people from Taranaki established Kaiwharawhara Pā at the bottom of the gorge at the mouth of the Kaiwharawhara Stream. Ngaio Gorge itself was used for hunting and gathering food. It also provided access between Wellington and the coast to the north, and was used by Māori going to Whanganui and Taranaki.

== Old Porirua Road ==
William Mein Smith and the New Zealand Company cleared bush along the existing Māori track and widened it in 1841, allowing the sale of sections along it from June, and it was widened several more times in the 1840s, although initially it was not suitable for vehicles. In 1845, Captain Daniel of Trelissick Farm at the head of Ngaio Gorge commissioned a road up the gorge. In 1846, gorge access was further improved when Governor George Grey enlarged and upgraded the road in order to send his troops to fight Te Rauparaha, and by 1860, Cobb & Company coaches were using the new road.

The route up through the gorge (later known as the Old Porirua Road) was developed to become the main road north up the west coast from Wellington to Porirua. It ran from Kaiwharawhara up the north side of Ngaio Gorge to Ngaio (then called Crofton) then on to Khandallah, Johnsonville and Tawa to Porirua Harbour. Most of the road still exists, although many sections have been superseded as through roads and are now local roads only.

== Kaiwharawhara Powder Magazine ==
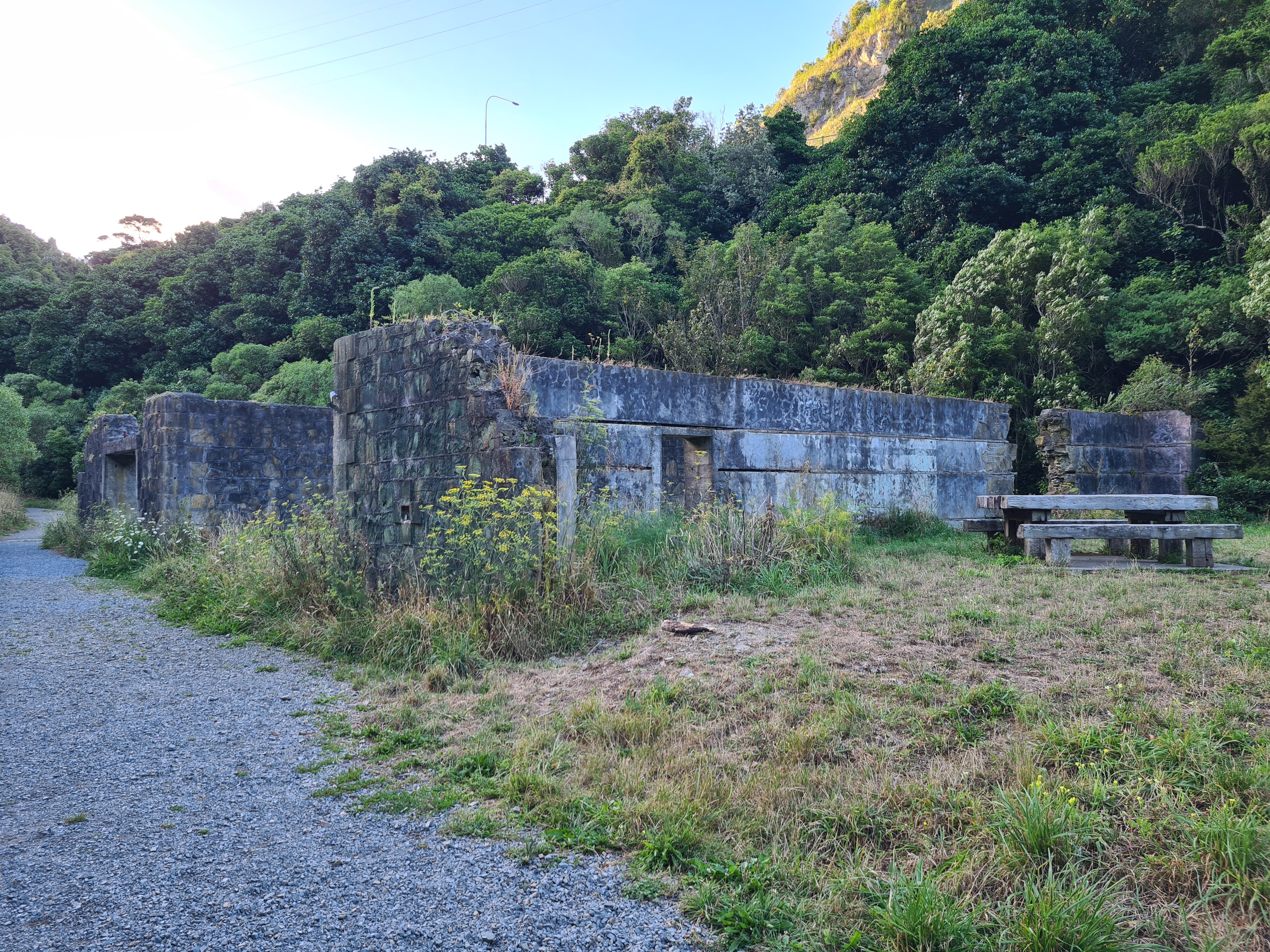
Remains of the Kaiwharawhara Powder Magazine

The Kaiwharawhara Magazine, designed by engineer and architect Charles O'Neill, was built during 1879–1880 in Ngaio Gorge as a bulk storage depot for dynamite and gunpowder. Originally for civilian use, the magazine was taken over for military use during the 'Russian Scare' of the mid-1880s. Fort Buckley was built on a ridge nearby in 1885–1886 and was supplied by the magazine. Explosives and ammunition were landed at a jetty at the mouth of the Kaiwharawhara Stream then transferred to the magazine. Its isolated location made it a safe place to store volatile material, but the site was prone to flooding and the damp valley environment made it difficult to keep gunpowder dry.

The magazine was used for storing explosives until 1920, and was later used for other purposes. The remains of two stone buildings still exist. They are noted for their construction using local stone, which is rare in Wellington. The magazine has a Historic Place Category 2 classification from Heritage New Zealand. Around 1999, Wellington City Council undertook some restoration of the buildings and site, but in 2000 damage to the surviving magazine occurred when a stolen vehicle was parked inside it and set alight. As of 2026, the magazine is part of Trelissick Park and the buildings are managed as ruins by Wellington City Council.

== Ngaio Gorge Road ==
The lower level Ngaio Gorge Road built in 1902 superseded the Old Porirua Road and is now the main access road between Ngaio and Wellington city and a key transport route in the event that Ngauranga Gorge is blocked.

The steep hillsides are prone to slips that, on occasion, cause traffic disruption. Heavy rain in July 2017 resulted in a large landslide, with boulders and rubble completely covering the road. In the following weeks, 3,500 cubic metres (120,000 cu ft) of rubble was cleared and a temporary 42-metre-long (138 ft) shipping container wall was installed to protect the road from further slips. A temporary road next to Trelissick Park was created to handle uphill traffic while the main road was reduced to one lane. In late 2020, work began on strengthening and stabilising the area around the slip. Retaining walls were built to support the downhill side of the road, with piles drilled up to 16 metres (52 ft) deep through clay to reach bedrock. Then the slip sites were stabilised with rock anchors and netting, and a new section of road constructed.

Ngaio Gorge in the 1880s. Kaiwharawhara Stream has been dammed to supply water to Schultze's flour mill on the left. No. 2 railway tunnel at right.

== Johnsonville Line railway ==
A railway line from Wellington to Longburn near Palmerston North was constructed in the 1880s by the Wellington and Manawatu Railway Company. It winds up the south side of the Ngaio Gorge with steep grades, tight curves, and brick-lined curving tunnels, to Ngaio, Khandallah, and Johnsonville before descending to Tawa Flat. After the government bought the company in 1908, the line became part of the main trunk line north to Auckland. In 1937 the Tawa Flat Deviation bypassing the line was completed and the line from Weillington through Ngaio Gorge became a suburban route ending at Johnsonville. Four of the Johnsonville Line's seven tunnels are in Ngaio Gorge.

== Kaiwharawhara Stream ==
The Kaiwharawhara Stream passes through Ngaio Gorge on its way to Wellington Harbour. The stream is home to redfin and bluegill bully; banded, shortjaw and giant kōkopu; kōaro; inanga; and longfin eels. Trout are also present.

Charles Schultze built a flour mill at the lower end of the gorge in 1846 and built a dam across the Kaiwharawhara Stream to create a head of water to power the mill's water wheel. The dam was still visible until a flood washed it away in 1942.

In 1941, the stream flooded heavily, causing damage including erosion of the Ngaio Gorge Road. In 1943, a 98-metre-long (320 ft), 3.0-metre-diameter (10 ft) tunnel was built to divert the stream near its mouth at Kaiwharawhara. This was expected to improve flood protection, allow the Ngaio Gorge Road to be straightened and provide usable areas of land on both sides of the stream. Before it came into use, there was a suggestion that the tunnel would make a good air-raid shelter.

Kaiwharawhara Stream emerges from a tunnel under the railway line to join the Korimako Stream in Trelissick Park. A fish ladder is visible to the right.

== Trelissick Park ==
In the early 1840s, Captain Edward Daniell named his 100-acre (40 ha) property in Ngaio 'Trelissick'. By 1900, Trelissick Bush was also called Major Deane's Bush, and there were competing calls to open up the land for development or to preserve it as a public reserve. In 1921, Wellington City Council bought a strip of bush-covered land from the Trelissick Estate to create a public reserve. The land lay between the railway line and the road in Ngaio Gorge. More land was added over time, so that the original 11 hectares (27 acres) expanded to 24 hectares (59 acres) by 2026, taking in the Kaiwharawhara Stream and including the Kaiwharawhara Magazine. The park has ecological value as the native bush and waterways form a corridor for birdlife. The Northern Walkway passes through the upper part of the park. A group of volunteers, the Trelissick Park Group, has played a large role in restoring and maintaining the park.
