= Wellington City Libraries =

Library system in Wellington, New Zealand

- 41°17′2″S 174°46′34″E
- Location: Wellington, New Zealand
- Established: 1893
- Branches: 14

Collection
- Size: 720,000 items

Other information
- Website: www.wcl.govt.nz

Wellington City Libraries is the public library service for Wellington, New Zealand.

== History ==
From 1841, various organisations operated a public library, often subscription-based, in Wellington. The first library operated from 1841–1843 in a raupo hut at the bottom of what is now Molesworth Street, and this was followed by libraries in other locations around the city. In 1889, local businessman and politician William Levin donated money to the city for building a library, prompting the setting up of the 'Free Public Library Fund' with fundraising events and donations from other people. Wellington City Council agreed to build and operate a public library, which was officially opened on 21 April 1893 on the corner of Mercer and Wakefield Streets in a building designed by William Crichton, a prominent architect of the time.

The reference section of the library opened on 1 May 1894 and in its first month was used by 306 men and 28 women. The most requested items included novels by George Eliot, works on sanitary engineering, yacht architecture and sailing, New Zealand Statutes, and science books. The most popular novelists in the circulating area of the library in its first six months of operation included Sarah Grand, Marie Corelli, Edna Lyall, Arthur Conan Doyle, H. Rider Haggard, Stanley Weyman, E. F. Benson, Thomas Hardy, Mrs Henry Wood, and Mrs Humphry Ward.

The library closed in 1940 and the building was demolished in 1943. The site was later occupied by the City Council Municipal Office Building which was demolished in 2025.

In 1940 a new library opened on a block between Mercer and Harris streets.

== Wellington Central Library ==
By the early 1960s, the existing library built in 1940 had become too small: some books were stored offsite because of lack of space, the newspaper reading room and some staff sections were housed elsewhere and there was a lack of space for casual seating and study.

In 1989, Athfield Architects were commissioned to design a new Wellington Central Library. Their design won the Environmental Award in the 1992 Carter Holt Harvey Awards and the New Zealand Institute of Architects National Award (1993). The library was built by Fletcher Development and Construction. The new Wellington Central Library was opened in 1991, and the previous library building then became the City Gallery. Both buildings are located in Civic Square, with the library having its main entrance on Victoria Street and another entrance from the mezzanine level onto Civic Square.

In March 2019, Wellington City Council announced that the Central Library was to be closed to the public, after receiving advice from engineers that the building has structural vulnerabilities which mean it might not perform well in the event of a significant earthquake. A month later the Council announced that it would spend $179 million to repair and upgrade the library rather than demolish it.

Following the closure of the Central Library, three pop-up replacement libraries opened in central Wellington: Arapaki Manners Library (opened in May 2019 in Manners Street and closed in 2024), He Matapihi Molesworth Library (opened in October 2019 inside the National Library in Molesworth Street, and closed in 2023), and Te Awe Library in Brandon Street (opened in July 2020, closed 1 March 2026). However, none of these had the reading rooms or the opening hours of the Central Library. Wellington Central Library's collection of 400,000 items was relocated to a new collection and distribution centre named Te Pātaka in Johnsonville while a new central library was constructed. The renovated central library, also known by its Māori name Te Matapihi ki te Ao Nui, opened in March 2026.

== Branches ==
Absolutely Positively Wellington Campaign badge promoting Wellington Public Libraries

Wellington's first branch library opened in Newtown in 1902, stocking general literature and a range of newspapers and magazines. As of March 2026, Wellington City Libraries has 11 suburban branches open to the public. Branches have also been given Māori names, usually based on a geographic feature or local legend.

- Brooklyn Library (Te Whare Pukapuka o Moe-rā)
- Cummings Park (Ngaio) Library (Te Whare Pukapuka o Korimako, Ngaio)
- Island Bay Library (Te Whare Pukapuka o Tapu Te Ranga)
- Johnsonville Library (Te Whare Pukapuka o Waitohi)
- Karori Library (Te Whare Pukapuka o Te Māhanga)
- Khandallah Library (Te Whare Pukapuka o Tari-Kākā)
- Mervyn Kemp (Tawa) Library (Te Whare Pukapuka o Te Takapū o Patukawenga). Mervyn Kemp was mayor of Tawa from 1955 until his retirement in 1983. The library was named in his honour in 1974.
- Miramar Library (Te Whare Pukapuka o Motu-kairangi)
- Newtown Library (Te Whare Pukapuka o Omārōrō).
- Ruth Gotlieb (Kilbirnie) Library (Te Whare Pukapuka o Te Awa-a-Taia). The library was renamed after Wellington City Councillor Ruth Gotlieb in 2000 in recognition of her contribution to library services, including support for a mobile library and delivering library books to housebound people.
- Wadestown Library (Te Whare Pukapuka o Ōtari)

== Library services ==
Membership of Wellington City Libraries is free to residents and to those who work, study or pay rates in Wellington. The library has offered a variety of services over the years to keep up with changes in technology, public taste and budget. Public-access computers were introduced in 1998 for patrons to access the catalogue digitally, and in 2001 the library spent $2.35 million upgrading the system to one that was Windows-based, internet-enabled and easier for patrons to use. As of 2025 Wellington City Libraries offers online remote access to databases, e-books and audiobooks, newspapers, magazines, films, music and language learning apps. Events held at the branch libraries include story times for young children, conversation groups for migrants, movie nights, and talks by authors.

From 1947 to 2006 the library operated a mobile service, taking books to communities that had no branch library or limited public transport, but this service was cancelled in 2006 due to low use and high costs. The library still has a housebound service, whereby volunteers will deliver books to those who are unable to get to a library.

Other examples of services no longer offered include the print collection and bestseller collection. The central library formerly held a collection of art prints which patrons could borrow. During the 1980s the library issued 7500–8000 prints annually, but by 1997 the number had halved and the print collection of 1200 items was sold. In 1996 the library introduced 'bestsellers': patrons could pay a small fee to jump the reserve queue for a bestselling book and borrow it immediately. This service ended in October 2022.

On 1 July 2022 the library stopped charging overdue fees for books not returned on time, in line with a world-wide trend in public libraries. The library manager stated that overdue fines "disproportionately affect those who cannot afford to pay" and that some poorer families were too afraid to borrow items in case they became overdue. It was hoped that removing fines would encourage more people to use the library. During the period from 2019 to March 2022, Wellington City Council received more than $800,000 from fines for overdue books, and when the new policy was put into place the council wiped over $500,000 of current fines from patrons' accounts. A survey conducted almost a year after the change found that more people were using the library.

In 2025, Wellington City Council data showed that most suburban libraries had experienced a significant drop in visitor numbers in the previous decade. For example at Island Bay there were 41,000 visitors in the 2023/24 year, less than half the number who visited in 2014/15. However book borrowing had changed at a different rate: 64,600 books were borrowed from Island Bay in 2023/24, compared with 81,900 a decade earlier. Each visitor is borrowing more books. Johnsonville library has dramatically increased patronage since it moved to new, larger premises in 2019. The new building has a café and a kindergarten and connects with other facilities including Keith Spry Pool, Johnsonville Community Centre and Memorial Park. Wellington City Councillor Ben McNulty believed that libraries need to become multi-purpose community spaces, saying “libraries...are a third space that people can just go to gather, study, contemplate, meet friends and meet family”.

== Awards ==
In 2006 the New Zealand Music Board honoured the Library with an excellence award for its "Sing along with Stu" story-time programme.

Te Awe Library in Brandon Street won the 2021 New Zealand Institute of Architects Wellington Architecture Award for public architecture for its design and décor.

Current Wellington city library buildings

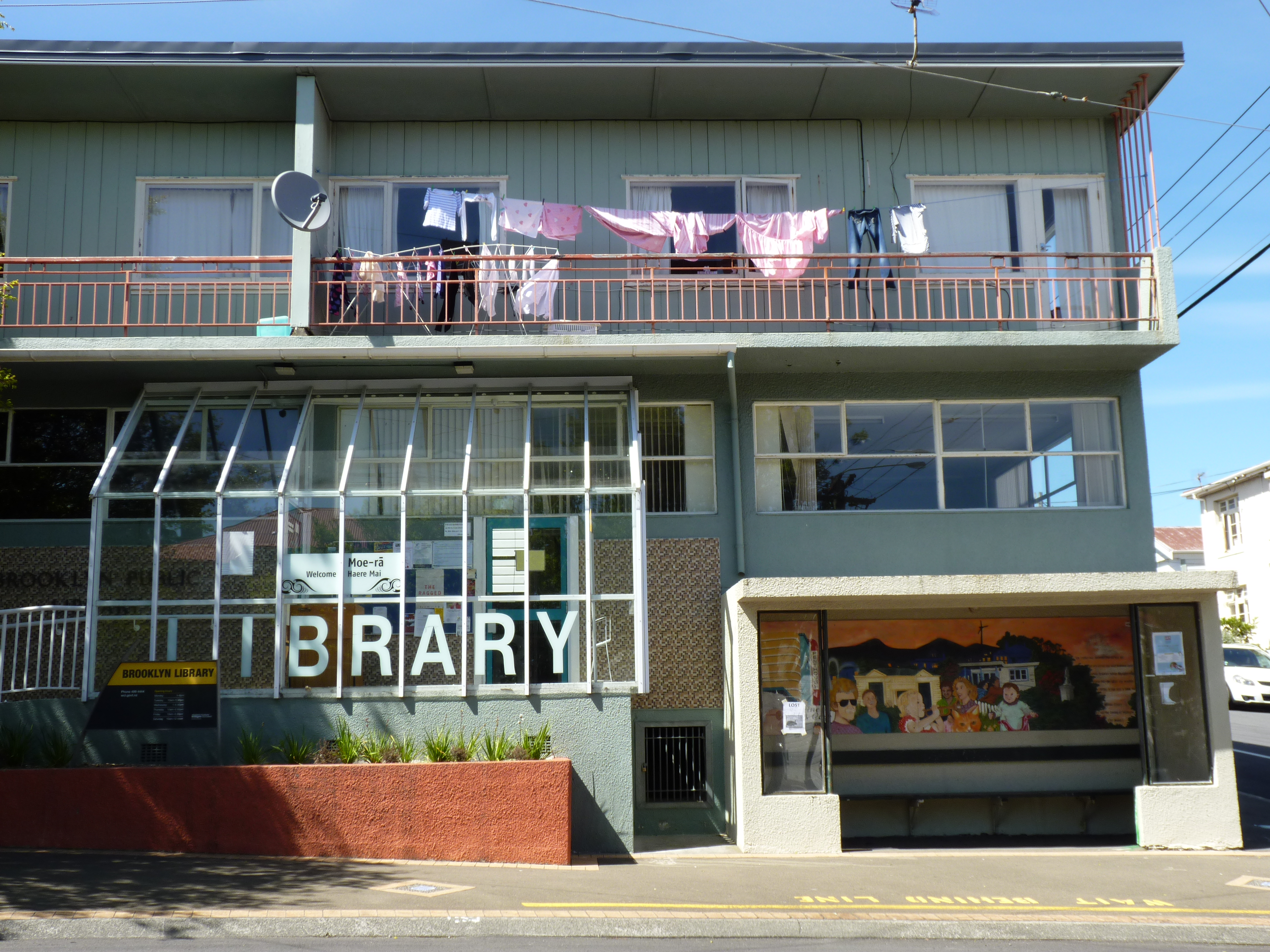
Brooklyn Library (2014)

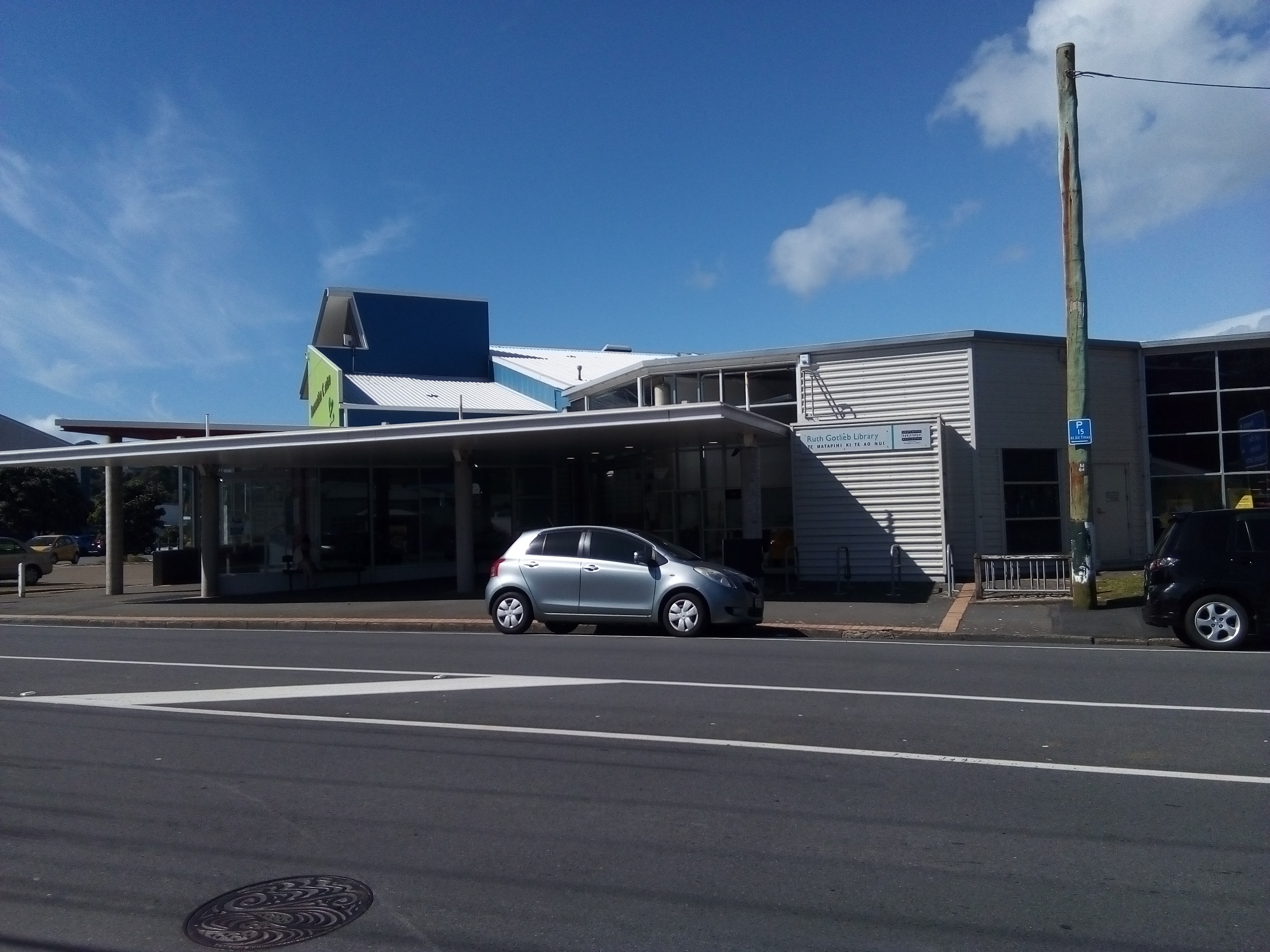
Ruth Gotlieb (Kilbirnie) Library (2018)

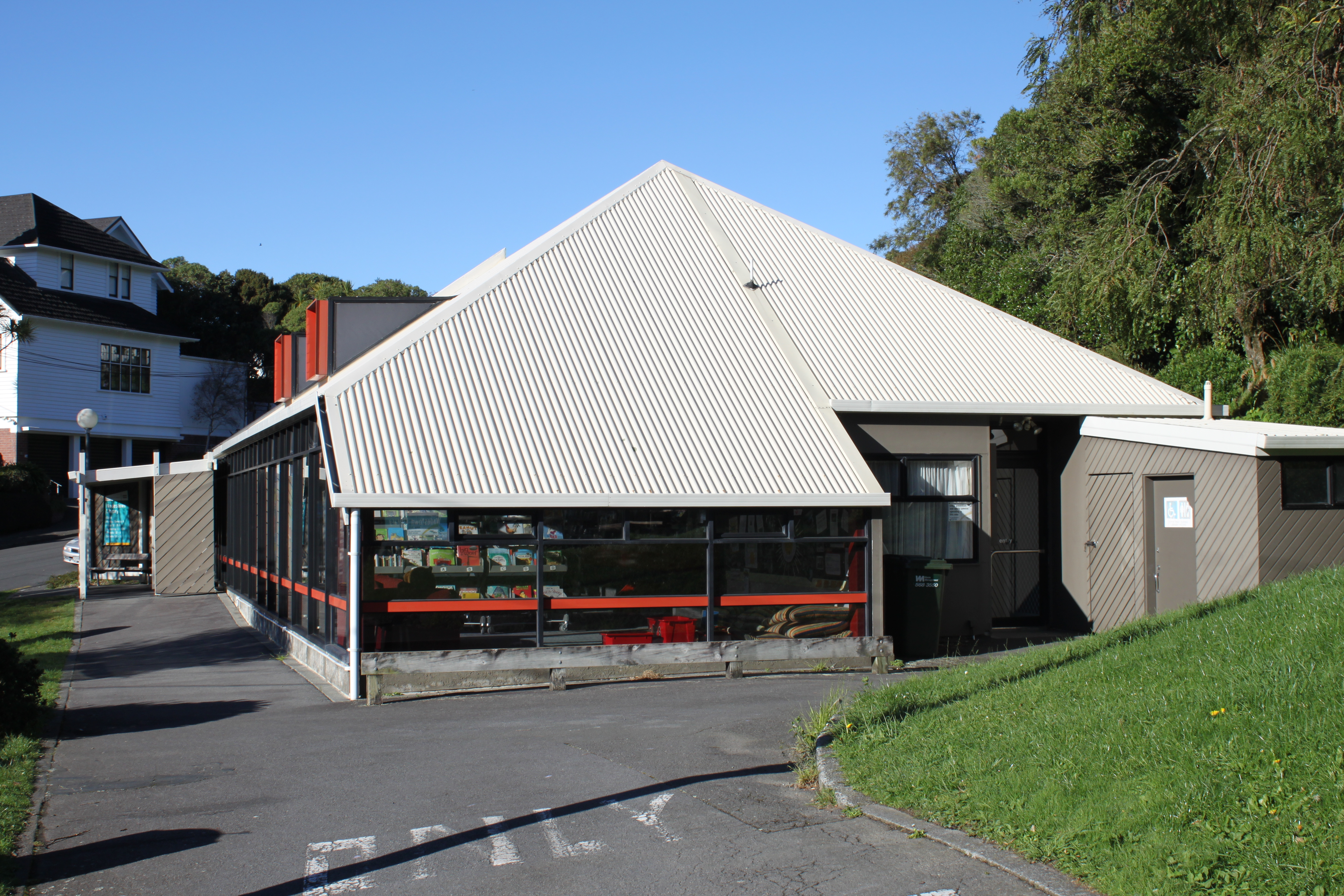
Wadestown Library (2012)

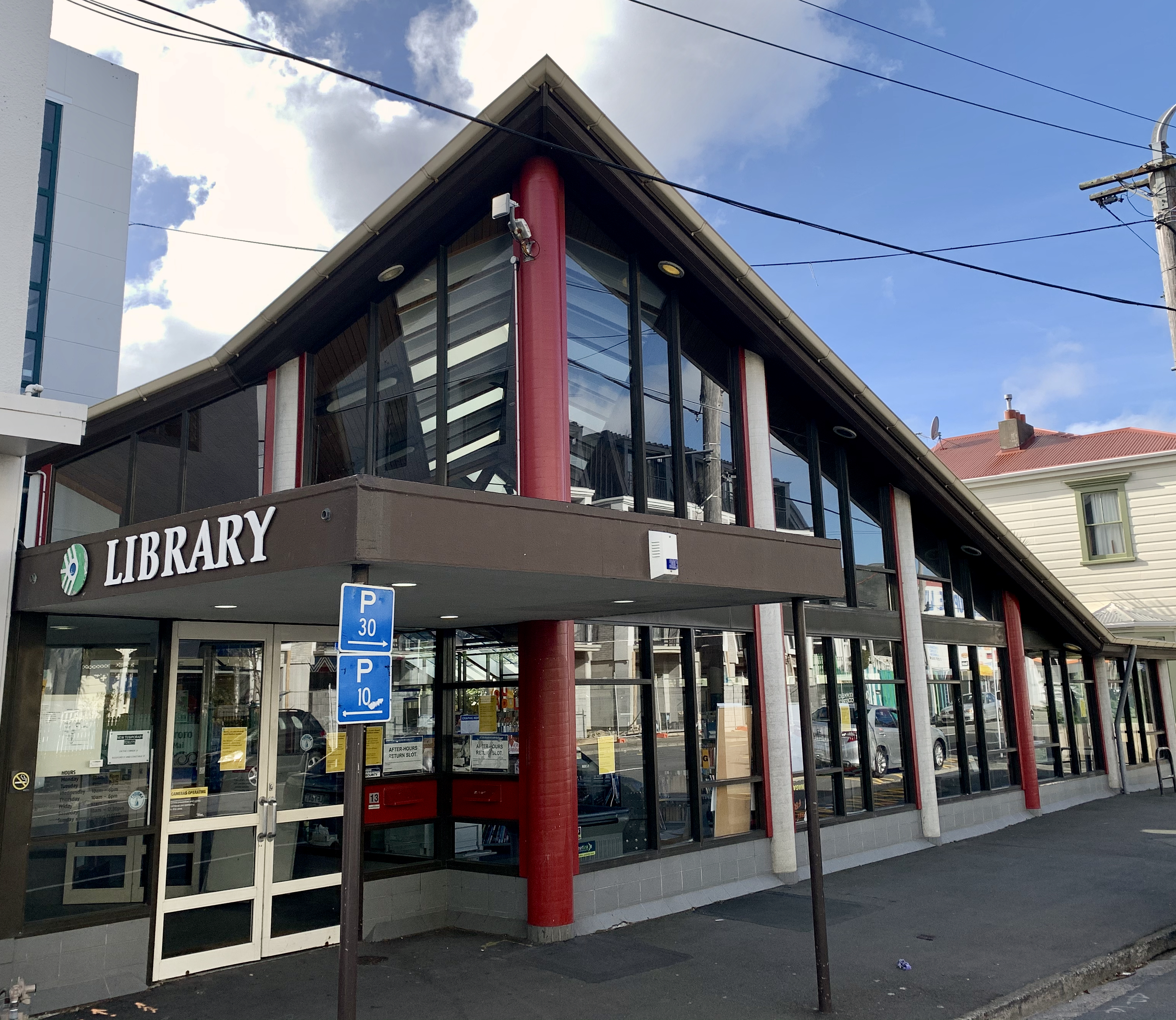
Newtown Library (2020)

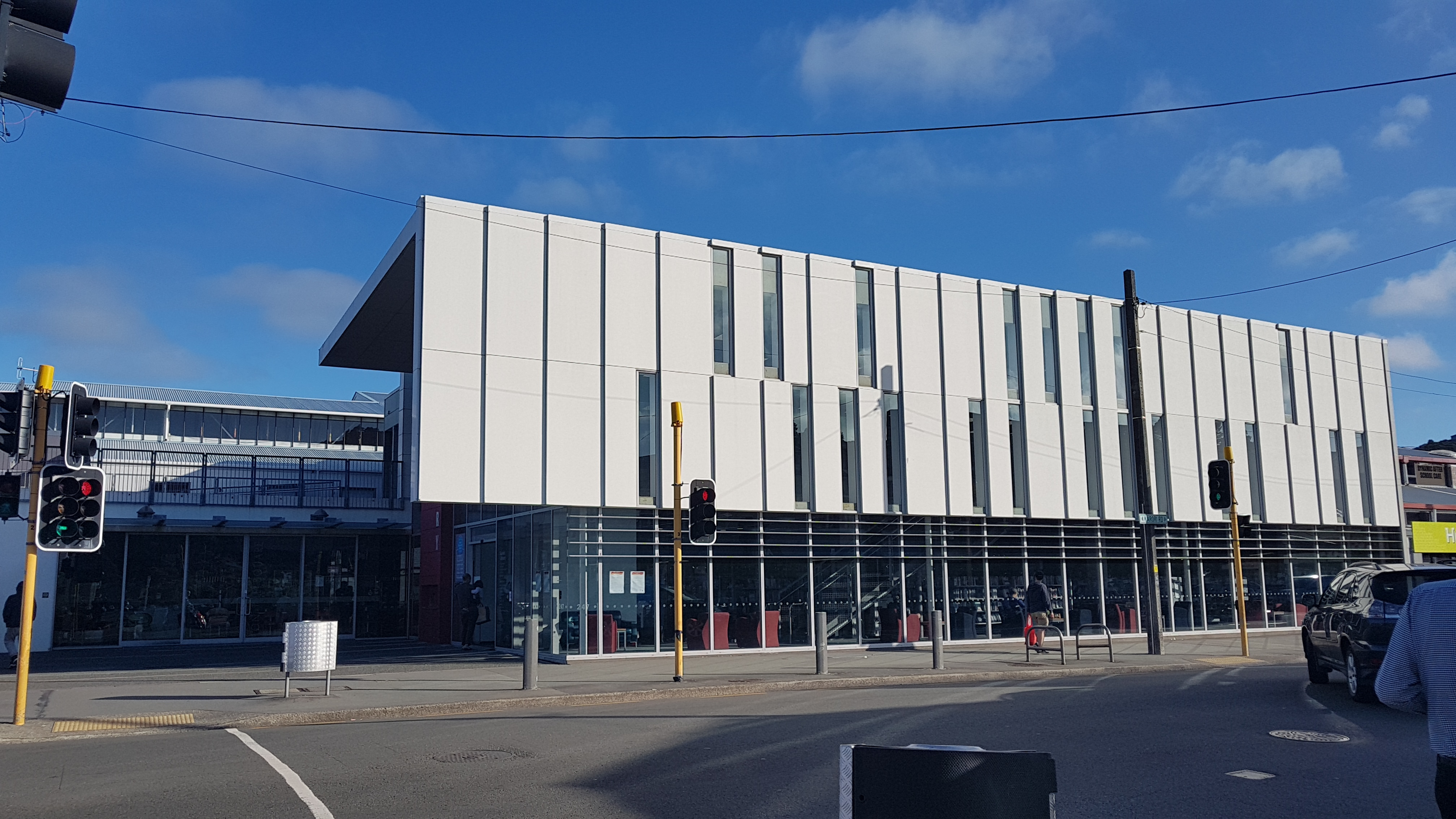
Karori Library (2020)

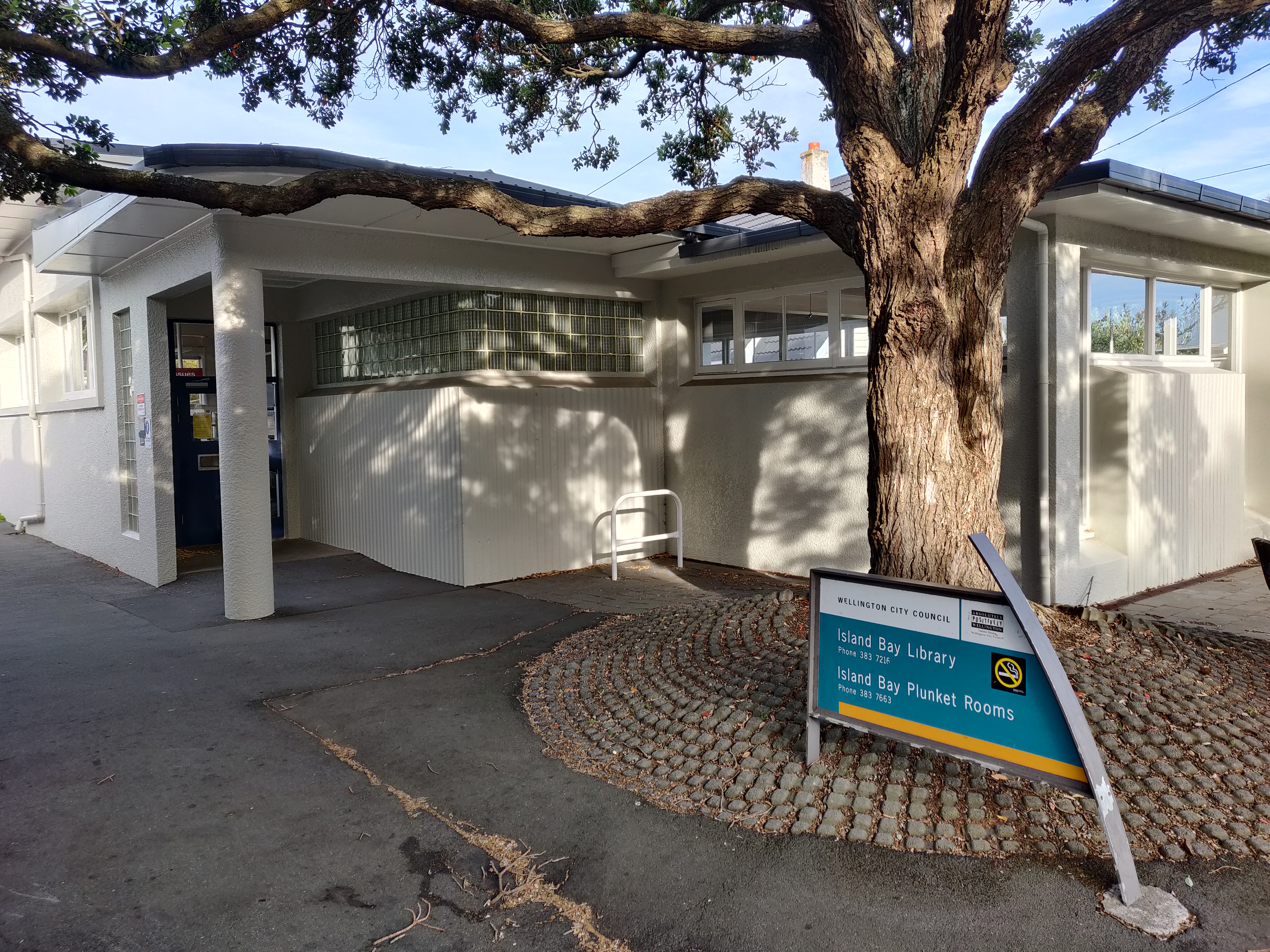
Island Bay Library

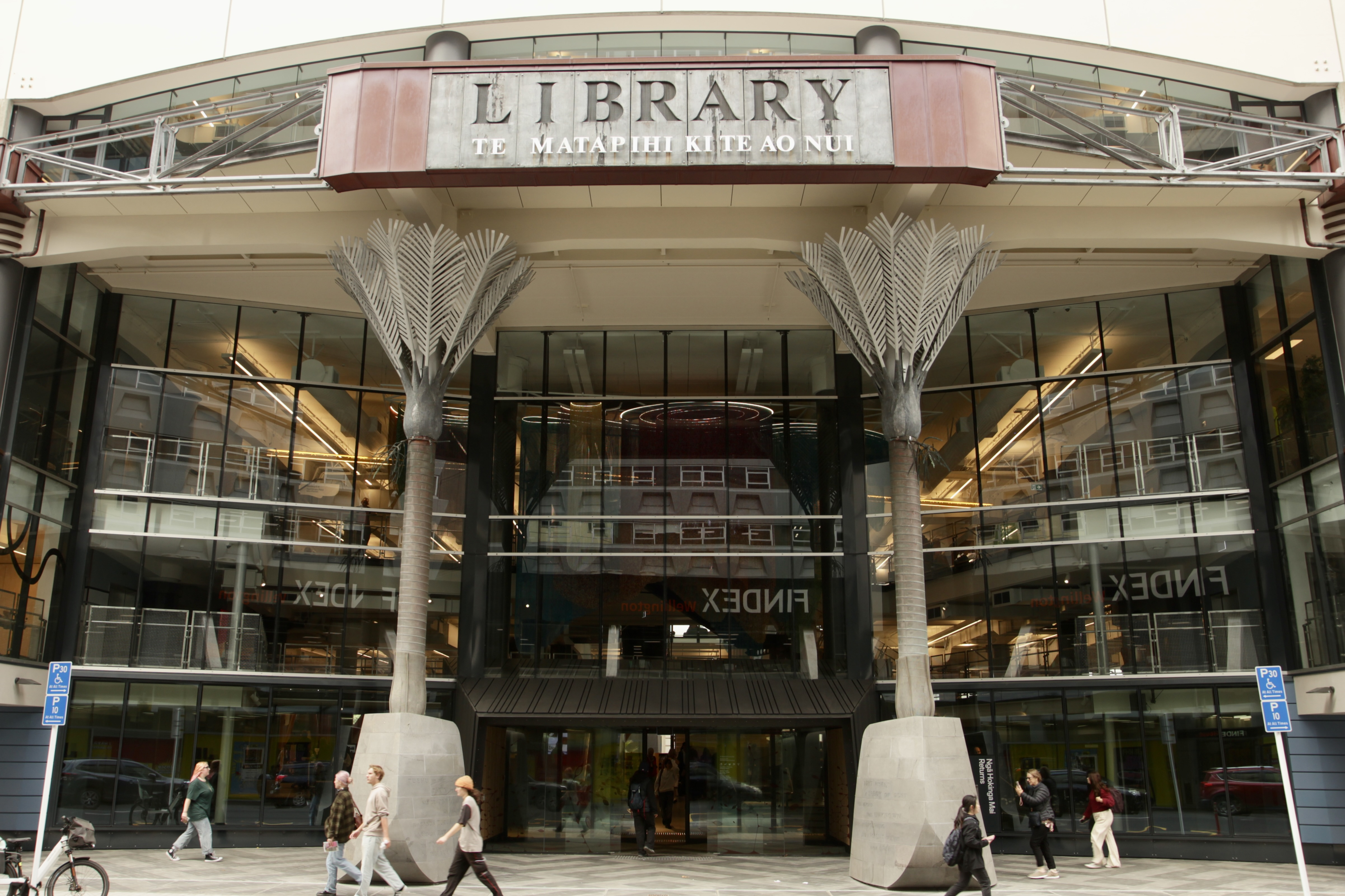
Te Matapihi ki te Ao Nui Central Library (2026)
Previous Wellington city library buildings

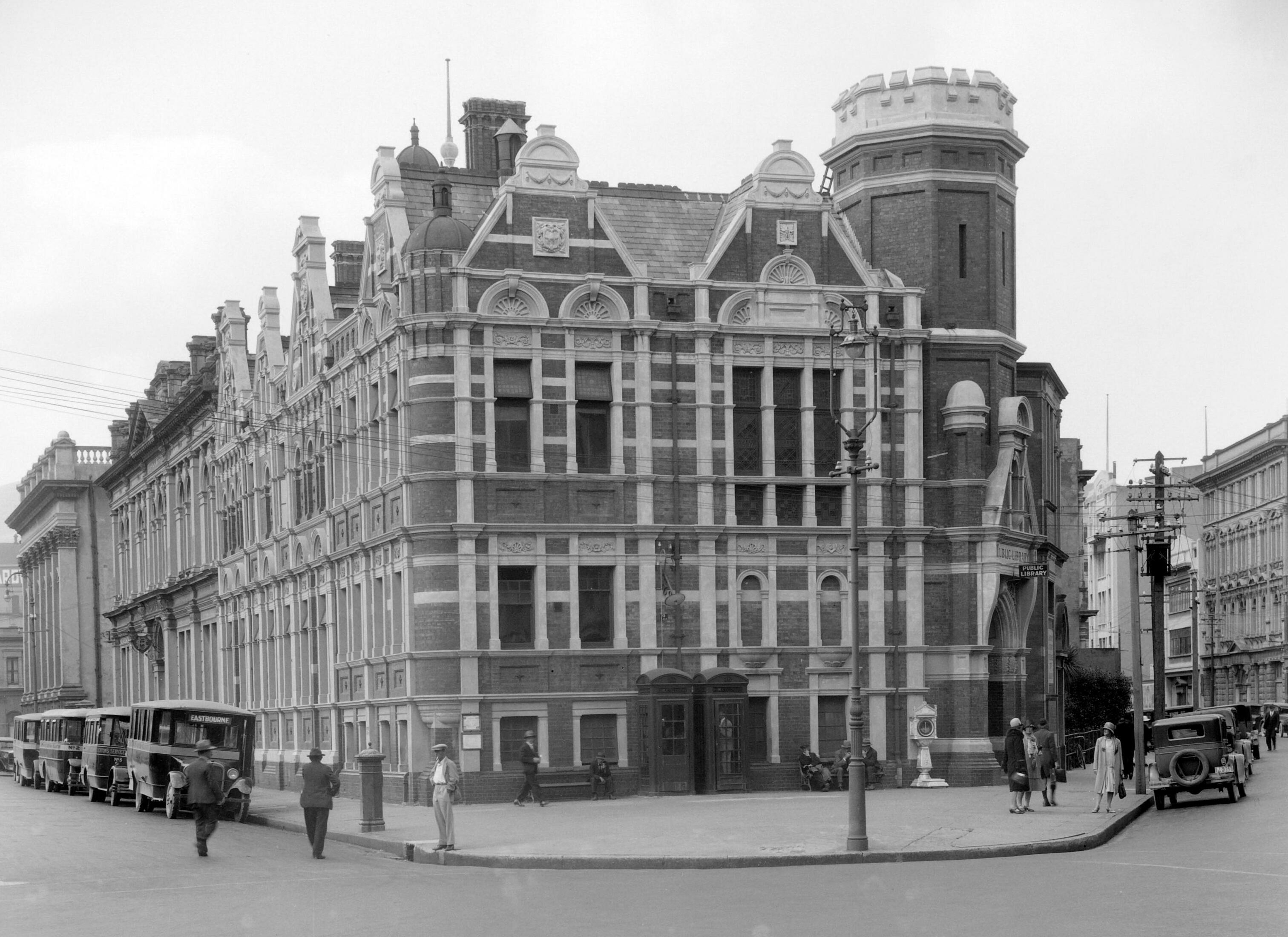
The original Public Library designed in 1891 and opened in 1893 (1930)

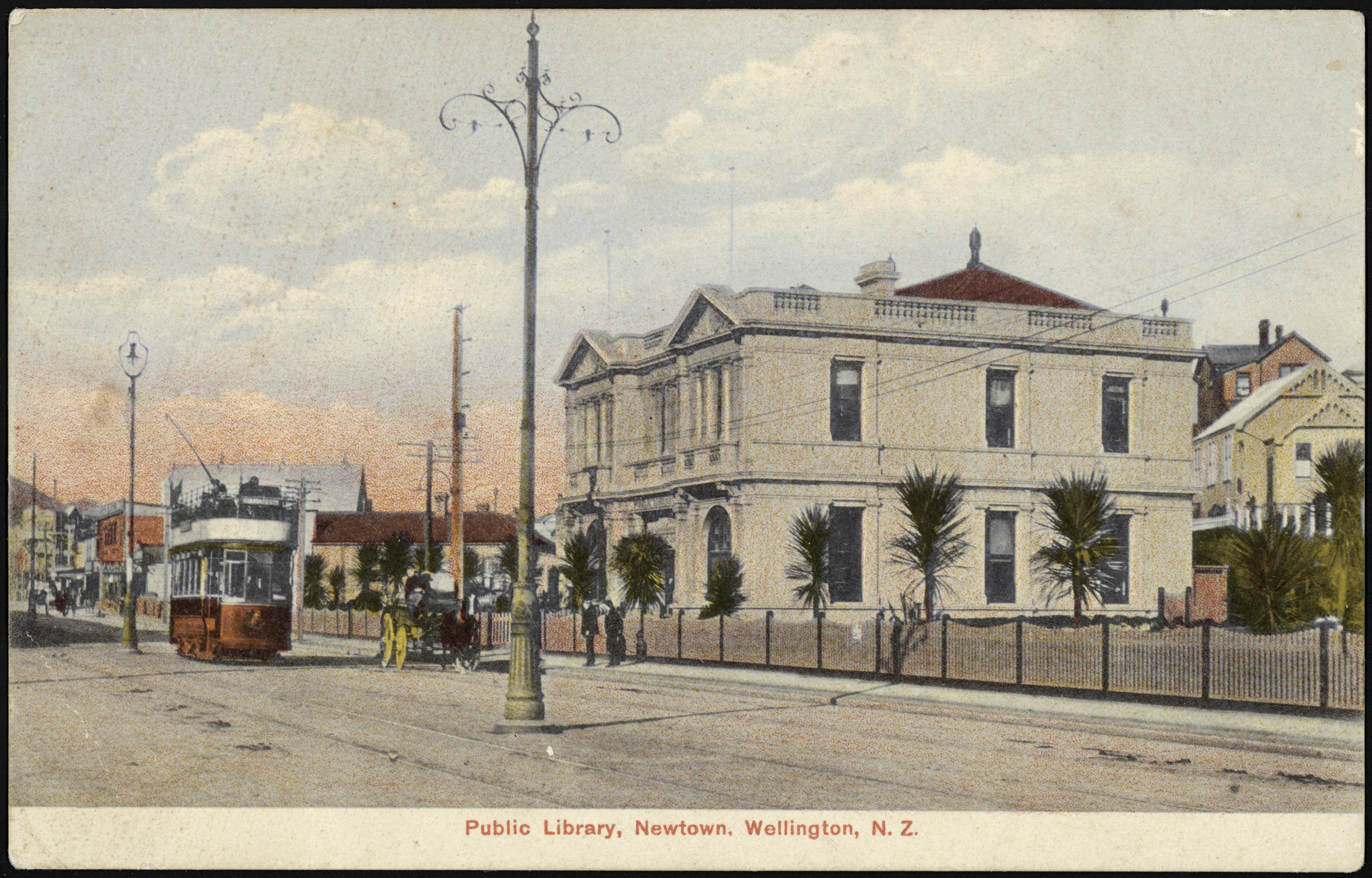
The Newtown Public Library (ca 1904-1914)

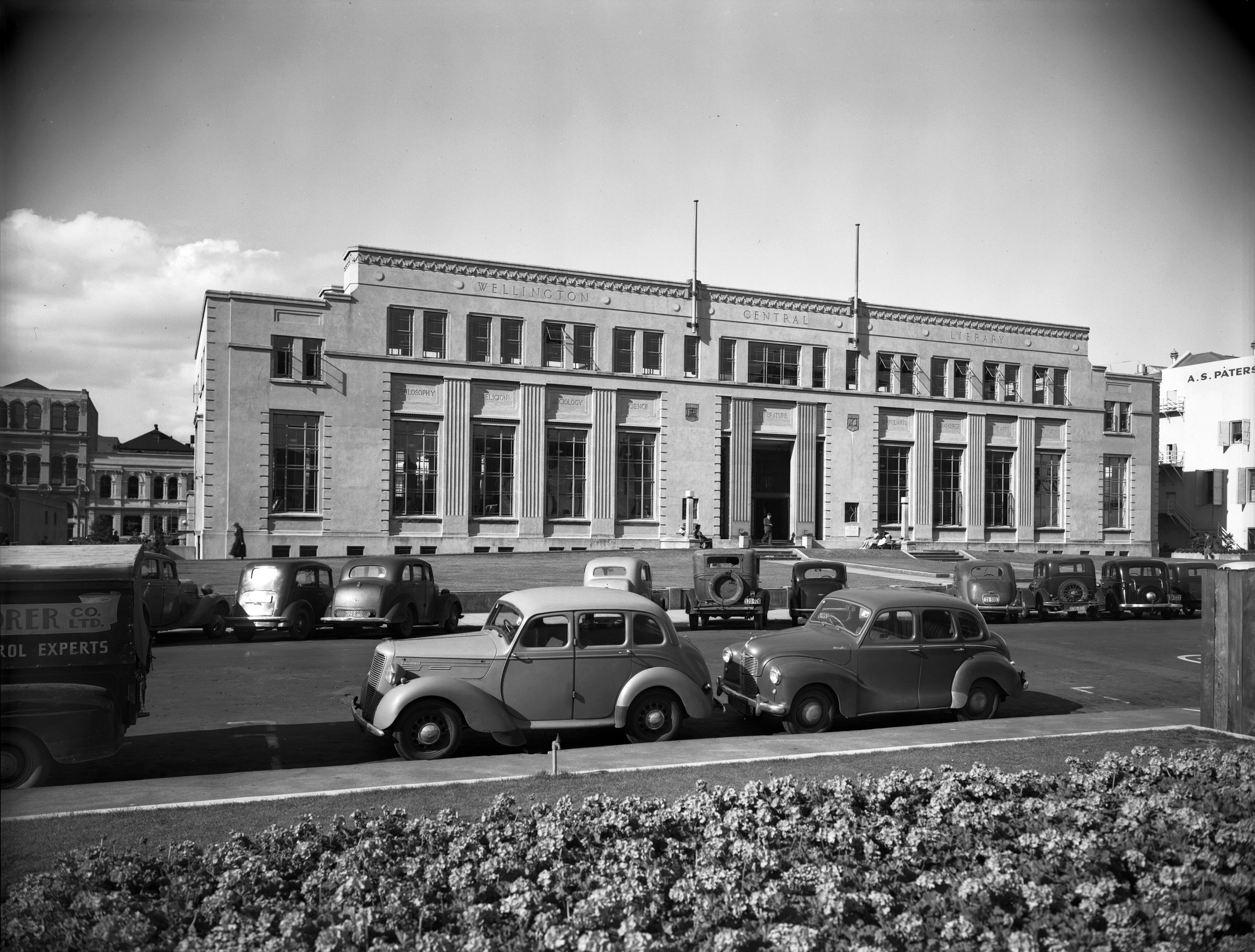
The Wellington Central Library built in 1937 (1940)
