= Old Porirua Road =

Former main road in Wellington, New Zealand

The Old Porirua Road in the 19th century was the main road north up the west coast from Wellington to Porirua in New Zealand. It ran from Kaiwarra (now Kaiwharawhara) up the Ngaio Gorge to Ngaio (then called Crofton), Khandallah, Johnsonville and Tawa to the Porirua Harbour. Most of the road still exists, although many sections are now local roads only, having been superseded as through roads.

== History ==
The road followed the route of a Māori track which was not suitable for wheeled vehicles. In the early 1840s "it was usually easier to pile up the timber and burn it" than to transport logs out; at Boxhill in Khandallah the atrocious road condition could require eight or ten bullocks to pull carts through.

William Mein Smith and the New Zealand Company cleared bush alongside the track and widened it in 1841, allowing the sale of sections along it from June. In February 1843 the company widened it to six feet (1.8 metres) and cleared bush to ten feet (3.0 metres) either side. Labourers got 14 shillings a week, and skilled carpenters and bricklayers £4; accommodation was not provided and most used tents. Settlement stopped at The Halfway (now Glenside) north of Johnsonville because the Ngāti Toa under Te Rauparaha and his nephew Te Rangihaeata questioned Colonel Wakefield’s land purchases in the Porirua Basin. They destroyed bridges, felled trees on the track and posted warning notices. In late 1845 the government reinforced the two companies of soldiers in Wellington with six hundred more troops. A show of force in the Hutt Valley ended with Ngāti Toa given £2000 (in instalments) for the disputed land at Porirua.

After the "Maori scare" of 1845-46 Governor Grey had the road from Jackson's Ferry or Fort Elliott in Porirua and The Barracks at Paremata to Wellington upgraded to fifteen feet (4.6 metres) wide by soldiers of the 58th and 99th Regiments under Captain Andrew Russell, assisted by Maori labourers. They were paid 2s (shillings) or 2s 6d per day; or 2s for the chief in charge and 1s for labourers. This employment was "very popular". The road from Jackson's Ferry at the south head of Porirua Harbour to the Hawtrey Church was seven miles and four chains (11.3 km) long and cost little more than £700 per mile.

The upgrading opened in December 1847 but was not completed until the end of 1848, well after any hostilities. Tyrone Power an Army officer said that in 1846 the road was a forest path, so bad and unpractical that all supplies had to be sent around by sea (to the Army at Porirua) but he wrote in 1847 that The road that used to be so bad and dangerous is now nearly a pleasant ride, and in the course of a month will be open all the way through for carriages and carts. Bishop Selwyn wrote in 1848: What an agreeable change from former journeys through the deep mud and fallen trees and the totara flats. A road perfectly smooth and almost level enabled me to proceed as comfortably by moonlight as in broad daylight

== Military Stockades ==
Stockades were erected along the road in the 1840s: Clifford's Stockade in Johnsonville; Middleton's Stockade near the Half Way in Johnsonville; McCoy's Stockade and Leigh's Stockade in Tawa and Fort Elliott in Porirua. There were also sentry boxes or posts on Mount Misery (Khandallah) "the coldest sentry box in town", and possibly Sentry Hill and Boxhill.

They were named after officers in charge:; Militia Captain Charles Clifford (later a politician); Lieut. L. R. Elliott & Lieut Chas E. Leigh (99th Regt.); Lieut Thos R. McCoy (65th Regt.) and Ensign Fredk. D. Middleton (58th Regt.).

== Ngaio ==
The Old Porirua Road above the Ngaio Gorge is now a local road. The lower level Ngaio Gorge Road built in 1902 which is now the main access to Ngaio was upgraded in the 1920s to take motor traffic.

== Khandallah ==
The road is now called Cockayne Road, and goes to Box Hill; where it joined the Bridle Track which goes down to north of Kaiwharawhara. The section from Box Hill to Johnsonville was built by Government surveyor Thomas Henry Fitzgerald as no road contractors would accept the risk. Civilians used bill hooks, mauls, mattocks, picks and crowbars for the one and a quarter miles (2.0 km) at a cost of £721.

Access to Khandallah was improved by construction of Onslow Road in the 1920s, and Burma Road to Johnsonville (superseding the Fraser Avenue section of the Old Porirua Road) was completed in 1936.

== Johnsonville and Glenside ==
Through Johnsonville the road went to the left of St John's Anglican (or Hawtrey) Church and down the "steep pinch" of Bassett Road from the intersection with Clifford Road, and having a grade so steep that it was called "Russell’s Folly".

A horse-drawn wagon carrying two muzzle-loading cannon from Fort Paremata to Wellington rolled off "Russell's Folly" into the swamp below, from whence they were retrieved in the 1920s. The cannon stood in Alex Moore Park for years; eventually the New Zealand Army sent one to the Waiouru Army Museum and the other to Trentham Camp.

On 20 October 1850 a meeting at The Halfway complained about the steep and dangerous roads up Kaiwarra Hill and "Russell’s Folly" from Johnsonville to The Halfway. Tenders were called in 1854 for a new road to the Halfway from the Anglican Church to Mr Drake's farm; this became Middleton Road. A road up the Ngauranga Gorge from Ngauranga to Johnsonville was opened in 1858; it joined Johnsonville Road at Fraser Avenue. The section of the Old Porirua Road from Khandallah was renamed Fraser Avenue after the Prime Minister Peter Fraser by the Johnsonville Town Board on 6 November 1941.

== Tawa ==
McCoy's Stockade was at the junction with the Takapu Valley road and Leigh's Stockade was at the junction with Oxford Street in Tawa, at the southern end and about where Mexted's Service Station is. The route of the Old Porirua Road through Tawa is now marked by bronze plaques in the footpath. The original route via Oxford Street was superseded by the present main road through the shopping centre when an obstructing bluff was removed. Tawa was called "Tawa Flat" until 1959.

== Porirua ==
Fort Elliott at Porirua was originally on the flat near the Porirua Stream estuary where the Porirua railway station is now, but was moved to a bluff over the road after flooding in 1846, The garrison comprised 2 officers and 60 men in October 1846.

== Old Coach Road ==
The Old Coach Road was the main road from Johnsonville to Ohariu Valley until 1908 when Ironside Road was built, though it was never used by coaches. Started about 1858 and completed in the mid-1860s, workers on the road for six shillings a day included James Bryant and his sons. Previously a road running through what is now Raroa Park and along Elliot Street to a saddle above Johnsonville Park and dropping steeply to Ohariu Valley was proposed.

It was the first road registered (Class I) by the New Zealand Historic Places Trust.
