= Macroinvertebrate Community Index =

Indicator of water quality and stream health

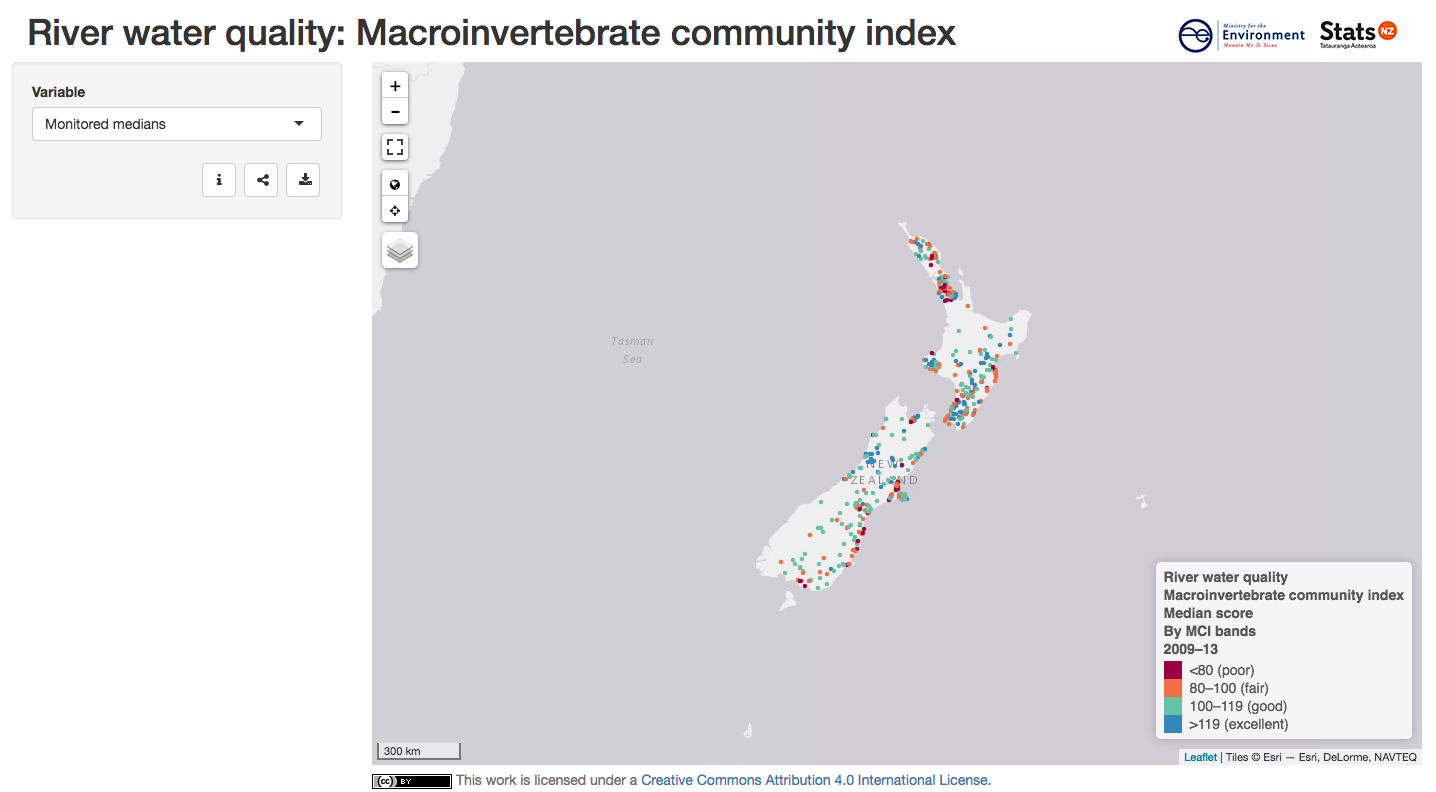

Macroinvertebrate Community Index (MCI) is an index used in New Zealand to measure the water quality of fresh water streams. The presence or lack of macroinvertebrates such as insects, worms and snails in a river or stream can give a biological indicator on the health of that waterway. The MCI assigns a number to each species of macroinvertebrate based on the sensitivity of that species to pollution. The index then calculates an average score. A higher score on the MCI generally indicates a more healthy stream.

The MCI (Macroinvertebrate Community Index) relies on an allocation of scores to freshwater macroinvertebrates based on their pollution tolerances. Freshwater macroinvertebrates found in pristine conditions would score higher than those found in polluted areas. MCI values can be calculated from macroinvertebrate presence-absence data using this equation:

MCI = [(site score)/(# of scoring taxa)]*20

Previous water quality assessments have relied on both chemical and habitat analysis, however, these methods have been proven to be insufficient due to pollution from nonpoint sources. Species living in an aquatic environment may be the best natural indicator of environmental quality and reveal the effects of any habitat alteration or pollution, and have proved to respond to a wide range of stressors such as sedimentation, urbanization, agricultural practices and forest harvesting effects. Any changes that may occur in macroinvertebrate communities that lead to a reduction in diversity increase the dominance of pollution-tolerant invertebrates, such as oligochaetes and chironomids. Thus, a lack of species diversity and low biotic index scores of inhabitant macroinvertebrates may be an indicator of poor water quality. The risk of water quality degradation is the greatest in low-elevation areas, where high intensity agriculture and urban development are the dominant land uses.

Macroinvertebrate communities are the preferred indicators of aquatic ecosystem health because they are very easy to both collect and identify, and have short life spans, thus responding very quickly to changes in their environment. The MCI methods of utilizing macroinvertebrate communities to assess the overall health of an aquatic environment continues to be reliable, applicable, and acclaimed method around the world.

Variations on the MCI

In addition to the MCI indexed defined above, there are also two other variations of the MCI. The QMCI (Quantitative Macroinvertebrate Community Index) and the SQMCI (Semi-Quantitative Macroinvertebrate Community Index). Both MCI and QMCI are widely used in countries like New Zealand. The combination of widespread use and good performance of the MCI and the QMCI in detecting water quality in aquatic ecosystems has sparked interest in further refinement of the methods in New Zealand. The QMCI, just like the MCI, was initially designed to evaluate the organic enrichment in aquatic ecosystems. The third index, the SQMCI, was created to reduce sampling and processing efforts required for the QMCI. The SQMCI will respond in a similar matter to the QMCI in community dominance, however, will require fewer samples to achieve the same precision. The SQMCI gives a comparative appraisal to the QMCI with under 40% of the exertion, in circumstances that macroinvertebrate densities are not required. This diminishes expenses and also enhances the logical solidness of biomonitoring projects. Both the QMCI and SQMCI are similar to the MCI in the way that they are graded on a 1 (extremely tolerant) to 10 (highly intolerant) scale. However, they differ in the way that MCI is calculated using presence-absence data whereas QMCI uses quantitative or percentage data. Having a qualitative, quantitative, and semi-quantitative version of the same index has raised some questions as to if this is a good thing or not. All three indexes have the same purpose, which is to measure the quality of an aquatic ecosystem, however, there are no clear recommendations about when each one is most appropriate to be used. In a study conducted on 88 rivers, Scarsbrook et al. (2000) concluded MCI is more useful than the QMCI for recognizing changes in stream water quality over time. Having three forms of a similar index may prompt to various conclusions and also opens the route for specific utilization of either file to give bias to a specific position or position taken by a specialist. In August 2019, the Ministry for the Environment released a draft National Policy Statement for Freshwater Management, and a report from Scientific and Technical Advisory Group that recommended including three different measures, MCI, QMCI and Average Score Per Metric (ASPM).

QMCI values can be calculated using:

QMCI = Σ_(i=1)^(i=s)▒(n_i*a_i)/N

SQMCI values can be calculated similarly to QMCI except that coded abundances are substituted for actual counts. Example:

SQMCI = Σ_(i=1)^(i=s)▒(n_i*a_i)/N

Factors Influencing MCI There are several factors which can affect the data acquisition of MCI when assessing the water quality of an aquatic ecosystem. Hard-bottom and Soft-bottom channels can often yield different results and many researchers will use two different versions of the MCI. For example, in a study by Stark & Mallard (2007) they discuss that hard and soft bottom channels have separate versions of the MCI and the two versions can not be combined into one data set because of the differences in taxa and tolerance values.

Spatial variability is also of interest in terms of affecting the data acquired through MCI. Sites which are progressively down stream often tend to yield a lower MCI value. There may also be confounding influences between riffles, runs, or pools with a single stream reach.

Depth and velocity have also been raised as a concern with regards to effecting results, however Stark (1993) investigated the influences of the sampling method, water depth, current velocity and substratum on the results and found that both MCI and QMCI are independent of depth, velocity, and substratum from macroinvertebrate samples collected from stony riffles. This finding is an advantage for the assessment of water pollution.

There have been several studies conducted on seasonal variability, which has been considered the main influential factor on the assessment of water quality. It has been concluded that all models should test data that has been collected in the season as the reference data, which is being used.

There have been several other factors such as water temperature, invertebrate life histories and dissolved oxygen levels that have all been explained as causes of seasonal variability. Warmer seasons have biotic indices that are indicative of poorer stream health. Warmer seasons such as summer, would have increased temperatures therefore increasing water temperature and decreasing the amount of dissolved oxygen in the water making the environment less ideal to aquatic macroinvertebrates. In return, this effects the density of macroinvertebrate population and changes the results of the indices.
