= Kaiwharawhara =

Coordinates: 41°15′36″S 174°47′22″E

- Suburb
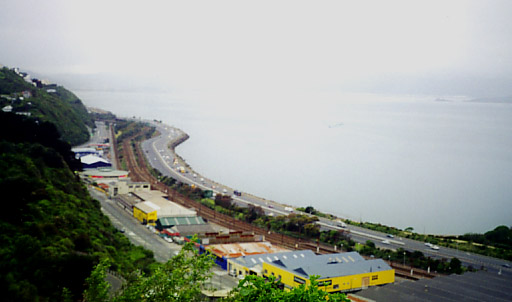
- Kaiwharawhara viewed from Barnard Street
- Interactive map of Kaiwharawhara
- Country: New Zealand
- City: Wellington
- Electoral ward: Wharangi/Onslow-Western Ward

Area
  - Land: 82 ha (200 acres)

Population (2023)
  - Total: 378
  - Density: 460/km^{2} (1,200/sq mi)
- Train stations: Kaiwharawhara railway station (closed)

Ngaio	Te Kainga	Cashmere
Wadestown	Kaiwharawhara	Wellington Harbour
Highland Park	Pipitea	Wellington Harbour

Kaiwharawhara is an industrial harbour-front suburb of Wellington in New Zealand's North Island. It is located north of the city centre on the western shore of Wellington Harbour, where the Kaiwharawhara Stream reaches the sea from its headwaters in Karori. It is a largely commercial and industrial area and thus has little residential population. A recent housing development up the hillside towards Te Kainga has increased the resident population.

Kaiwharawhara contains some major transport infrastructure. Both State Highway 1 and the North Island Main Trunk railway pass through Kaiwharawhara on their routes from central Wellington northwards. Due to its waterfront location, Kaiwharawhara also has shipping activity, with the Wellington Interislander ferry terminal located on the boundary of Kaiwharawhara and Pipitea.

Kaiwharawhara railway station was closed in 2013, and the suburb is now served by buses. Just north of the station the Wairarapa Line (including the commuter Hutt Valley Line) diverges from the North Island Main Trunk railway.

In sport, Kaiwharawhara was previously represented in football by Waterside, a club formed by dock workers in 1921. In 1988, they merged with the Karori Swifts to form Waterside Karori AFC.

== Etymology and history ==
The area has always been known to Māori as Kaiwharawhara, which is Māori for 'food' (kai) and 'the fruit of the Astelia (wharawhara). Jerningham Wakefield during the 1840s commented that the stream was called after the "wharrawharra", and from this, the name was corrupted in European usage to Kaiwarra. The suburb (and the station) name was corrected from Kaiwarra to Kaiwharawhara from 9 February 1951 by a decision of the New Zealand Geographic Board.

The Old Porirua Road went up the Ngaio Gorge to Ngaio and Porirua.

From 1890 Kaiwharawhara was part of the Borough of Onslow until the borough amalgamated with Wellington City in 1919.

Factories in the area included John Newton's Caledonian soap works from the 1880s to the 1960s, Charles Schultze's flourmill and Hirst's tannery. William Cable & Company had a foundry. The NEECO factory in the 20th century produced electric stoves for state houses and thousands of Army items like steel water bottles in World War II. From 1927, the Gorge area had large tanks for Atlantic Oil's bulk petrol storage, in a former quarry, which had been the source of fill for harbour reclamation in the 1870s. There was a major leak from a pipe at the depot, which polluted much of the harbour in 1967.

The railways started construction of railway houses for staff at the Kaiwharawhara Settlement in 1920, within two miles of the busiest railway yard ... .

== Toll-gate ==
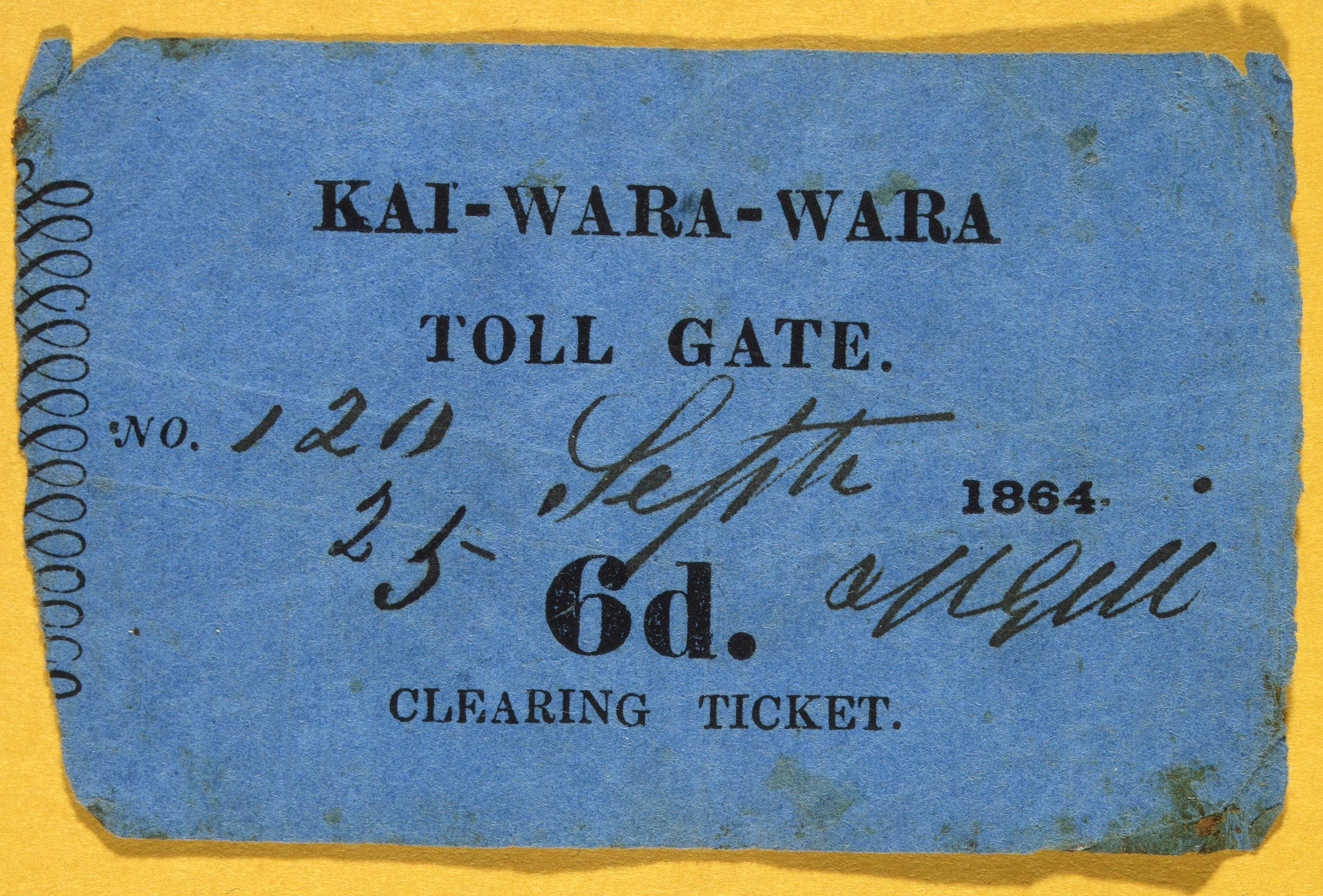

A toll-gate was established at Kaiwharawhara by the Hutt County Council. It caught all vehicular and other traffic in and out of Wellington and made a substantial charge for the maintenance of roads. Hutt County ran from Cook Strait to Waikanae and the Rimutakas and the money was spent on road improvements that gave little or no benefit to Wellington residents. The toll-gate was removed when Kaiwharawhara joined the Borough of Onslow in 1890. The Hutt County set up new gates on the Hutt Road and Ngauranga Gorge.

== Demographics ==
Kaiwharawhara covers 0.82 km^{2} (0.32 sq mi). It is part of the larger Pipitea-Kaiwharawhara statistical area.

Historical population
Year	Pop.	±% p.a.
2006	264	—
2013	258	−0.33%
2018	369	+7.42%
2023	378	+0.48%
The 2006 population is for a smaller area of 0.75 km^{2}. Source:

Kaiwharawhara had a population of 378 in the 2023 New Zealand census, an increase of 9 people (2.4%) since the 2018 census, and an increase of 120 people (46.5%) since the 2013 census. There were 198 males, 177 females, and 3 people of other genders in 150 dwellings. 8.7% of people identified as LGBTIQ+. There were 48 people (12.7%) aged under 15 years, 81 (21.4%) aged 15 to 29, 189 (50.0%) aged 30 to 64, and 66 (17.5%) aged 65 or older.

People could identify as more than one ethnicity. The results were 80.2% European (Pākehā); 13.5% Māori; 2.4% Pasifika; 21.4% Asian; 3.2% Middle Eastern, Latin American and African New Zealanders (MELAA); and 3.2% other, which includes people giving their ethnicity as "New Zealander". English was spoken by 96.0%, Māori by 1.6%, and other languages by 22.2%. No language could be spoken by 2.4% (e.g. too young to talk). New Zealand Sign Language was known by 0.8%. The percentage of people born overseas was 28.6, compared with 28.8% nationally.

Religious affiliations were 27.0% Christian, 7.1% Hindu, 0.8% Islam, 0.8% Jewish, and 3.2% other religions. People who answered that they had no religion were 55.6%, and 6.3% of people did not answer the census question.

Of those at least 15 years old, 141 (42.7%) people had a bachelor's or higher degree, 150 (45.5%) had a post-high school certificate or diploma, and 48 (14.5%) people exclusively held high school qualifications. 117 people (35.5%) earned over $100,000 compared to 12.1% nationally. The employment status of those at least 15 was 213 (64.5%) full-time, 45 (13.6%) part-time, and 3 (0.9%) unemployed.
