= Ngaio, New Zealand =

Suburb of Wellington City, New Zealand

Ngaio
- Suburb
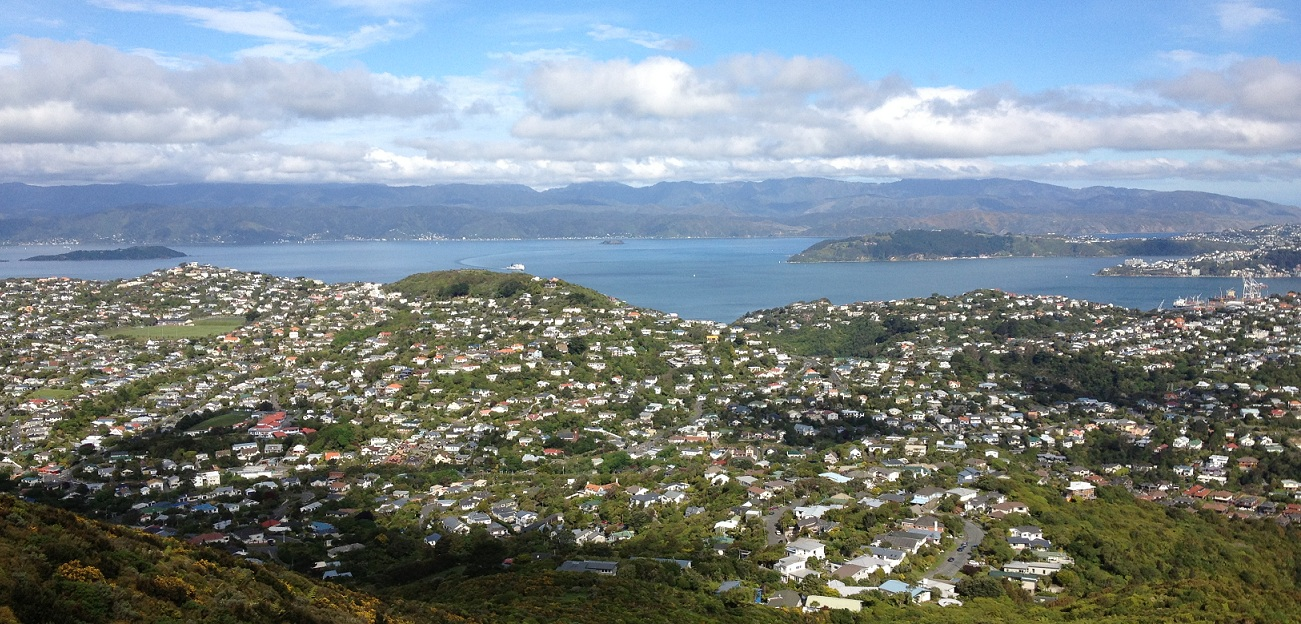
- Ngaio, from the hills above it
- Interactive map of Ngaio
- Coordinates: 41°15′00″S 174°46′23″E
- Country: New Zealand
- City: Wellington
- Local authority: Wellington City Council
- Electoral ward: Wharangi/Onslow-Western; Te Whanganui-a-Tara Māori Ward
- Established: 1908

Area
  - Land: 219 ha (540 acres)

Population (June 2025)
  - Total: 5,650
  - Density: 2,580/km^{2} (6,680/sq mi)
- Postcode: 6035
- Railway stations: Ngaio, Awarua Street

	Mount Kaukau
Crofton Downs	Ngaio	Khandallah
	Kaiwharawhara, Wadestown

Ngaio (Māori: [ˈŋaio], colloquially /ˈnaɪoʊ/ NY-oh,) is an inner suburb of Wellington, the capital city of New Zealand. It is situated on the slopes of Mount Kaukau, 3500 metres north of the city's CBD. It was settled in the 1840s and many of its streets are named after early settler families. Ngaio was originally a logging community known first as Upper Kaiwarra, then as Crofton until 1908. The area was administratively part of a separate local authority called the Onslow Borough Council which amalgamated with Wellington City in 1919.

Ngaio takes its name from a New Zealand native tree, the ngaio.

== Facilities ==
Ngaio contains a library, multi-purpose hall, pharmacy, petrol station, two cafés, Plunket rooms, dentist, medical centre, tennis courts and a variety of small shops.

Ngaio's dwellings are a mix of ages and styles, including original colonial buildings built in the 1860s, railway cottages and bungalows built in the 1920s and 30s, and 1960s weatherboard houses. The Tarikaka Settlement is a small area of former railway cottages built in 1928 on Tarikaka Street, Bombay Street, Carroll Street, Khandallah Road, Ngata Street, Raihania Lane and Pomare Street.

=== Library ===
Wellington City Libraries operates Cummings Park Library which is situated at the south entrance of Cummings Park on Ottawa Road. Opened in 1989, and refurbished in 2008, the library's entrance is paved with 850 tiles made by local potters Paul Winspear and Paul Wotherspoon and decorated by children from Ngaio and Chartwell Schools.

The library's Māori name is Korimako, named after the Korimako stream that runs through Ngaio.

The library offers internet access, free Wi-Fi, word processing, printing and faxing. The library collection includes a special collection of local oral history, detailing the memories of prominent Ngaio locals.

Regular preschool and educational programs are run during the week including Baby Rock & Rhyme for babies (aged 0 to 2 years), storytime for children aged 3 – 4 and Kōhunga Kōrero: Pakiwaitara i roto i te reo Māori – monthly storytime in te reo Māori for children aged 2–6 years old.

=== Town hall ===
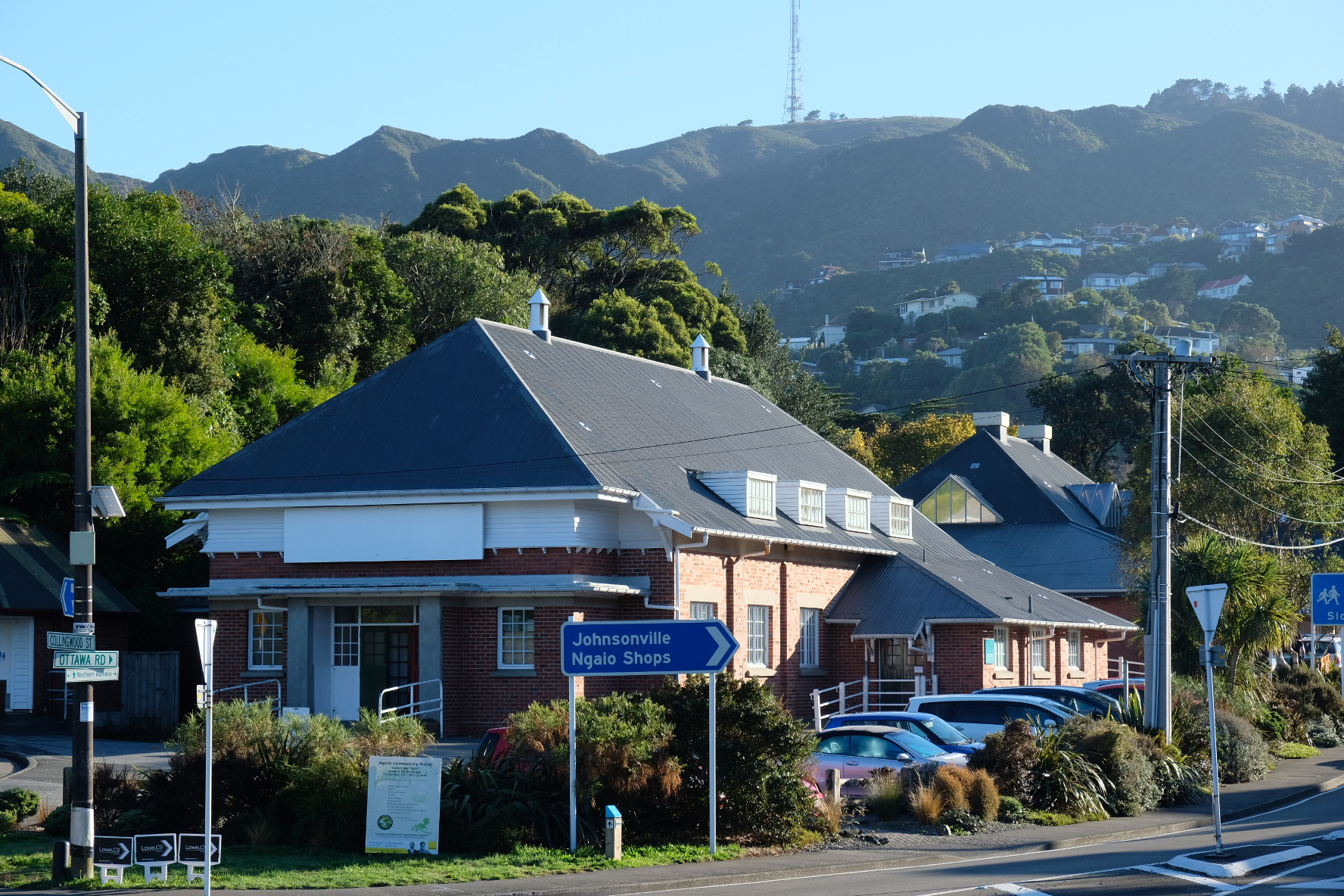
Ngaio Town hall

The Ngaio town hall offers a venue for community services, sports, performances, cultural and private events. The hall contains a stage, kitchen, drop in centre and the Ngaio toy library. The hall has a capacity of 300 people and has an accessible entry ramp at the front. The hall was opened in 1924 and was renovated in 1989.

Groups that regularly use the hall include:

- Bodh Gaya Buddhist Centre
- Ngaio Badminton Club
- Ngaio Drop In Centre
- Ngaio Toy Library
- Onslow Table Tennis Club

There is also occasionally a book sale there, organised by the Blue Dragon Children's Foundation, a non-governmental organisation.

=== Parks and reserves ===
Trelissick Park runs from the bottom of the Ngaio Gorge road and runs across the borders of nearby Wadestown and Crofton Downs. The area acts as an ecological corridor between the Harbour and the northern suburbs. The park has historic gunpowder magazines built in the 1870s. While the park contains areas of original forest remnant, it is also under on-going restoration work led by the Trelissick Park Group that was set up in 1991. Since then, over 80,000 trees have been planted in the area, along with weed management, trapping and bridge building.

Orleans Makererua reserve runs from Makererua street to Orleans street and has remnants of the native bush that was originally throughout Ngaio.

Cummings park is off Ottawa road and has a children's playground and dog exercise area.

== Transport ==
The suburb is served by the Johnsonville Branch commuter railway which connects it to the central city. There are two railway stations in Ngaio; Ngaio railway station and Awarua Street railway station.

Buses operate two bus routes through Ngaio; numbers 25 and 26. Route 22 is operated by NZ Bus

=== Ngaio Gorge ===
Ngaio Gorge is the main road between Ngaio and Wellington city and is a key transport route in the event of an earthquake. The road is described as a "primary access road for the Onslow area" and a "critical escape route from the city should Ngauranga Gorge become impassable" by Onslow-Western Ward Councillor, Simon Woolf. Heavy rains in July 2017 resulted in a large landslide, with boulders and rubble completely covering the road. In the following weeks, 3500 cubic metres of rubble were cleared and a temporary 42 metre long shipping container wall was installed to protect the road from further slips. A temporary road next to Trelissick Park was created to handle uphill traffic when the main road was reduced to one lane. The Wellington City Council planned to extend the shipping container wall in preparation for construction of a permanent solution in late 2019.

== Demographics ==
Ngaio, comprising the statistical areas of Ngaio North and Ngaio South, covers 2.19 km^{2} (0.85 sq mi). It had an estimated population of 5,650 as of June 2025, with a population density of 2,580 people per km^{2}.

Historical population
Year	Pop.	±% p.a.
2006	5,259	—
2013	5,502	+0.65%
2018	5,631	+0.46%
2023	5,544	−0.31%

Ngaio had a population of 5,544 in the 2023 New Zealand census, a decrease of 87 people (−1.5%) since the 2018 census, and an increase of 42 people (0.8%) since the 2013 census. There were 2,682 males, 2,808 females, and 54 people of other genders in 2,121 dwellings. 6.0% of people identified as LGBTIQ+. The median age was 40.5 years (compared with 38.1 years nationally). There were 999 people (18.0%) aged under 15 years, 1,026 (18.5%) aged 15 to 29, 2,874 (51.8%) aged 30 to 64, and 645 (11.6%) aged 65 or older.

People could identify as more than one ethnicity. The results were 87.3% European (Pākehā); 7.0% Māori; 1.9% Pasifika; 9.4% Asian; 1.9% Middle Eastern, Latin American and African New Zealanders (MELAA); and 3.2% other, which includes people giving their ethnicity as "New Zealander". English was spoken by 97.8%, Māori by 2.4%, Samoan by 0.5%, and other languages by 15.2%. No language could be spoken by 1.6% (e.g. too young to talk). New Zealand Sign Language was known by 0.3%. The percentage of people born overseas was 26.1, compared with 28.8% nationally.

Religious affiliations were 23.9% Christian, 1.4% Hindu, 0.6% Islam, 0.4% Māori religious beliefs, 0.8% Buddhist, 0.3% New Age, 0.3% Jewish, and 1.7% other religions. People who answered that they had no religion were 66.7%, and 4.2% of people did not answer the census question.

Of those at least 15 years old, 2,688 (59.1%) people had a bachelor's or higher degree, 1,485 (32.7%) had a post-high school certificate or diploma, and 363 (8.0%) people exclusively held high school qualifications. The median income was $71,300, compared with $41,500 nationally. 1,641 people (36.1%) earned over $100,000 compared to 12.1% nationally. The employment status of those at least 15 was 2,853 (62.8%) full-time, 642 (14.1%) part-time, and 93 (2.0%) unemployed.

Individual statistical areas
Name	Area (km^{2})	Population	Density (per km^{2})	Dwellings	Median age	Median income
Ngaio North	0.82	2,475	3,018	960	39.1 years	$69,200
Ngaio South	1.37	3,069	3,069	1,161	41.9 years	$73,200
New Zealand					38.1 years	$41,500

== Education ==
=== School enrolment zone ===
Ngaio is within the enrolment zones for Wellington Girls' College, Onslow College, St Oran's College, Raroa Normal Intermediate and Ngaio School.

=== Primary school ===
Ngaio School is a coeducational contributing (years 1–6) state primary school, established in 1908. In 1928 it was moved to its current location at 45 Abbott Street. It has a roll of 275 as of July 2026. The school does not have a uniform. Its school song is Tūrangawaewae, Māori for "A Place to Stand". The school acts as a Civil defense centre set up by the Wellington Regional Emergency Management Office (WREMO) to provide support and information to their surrounding communities. They do not store emergency food, water or other supplies.

=== Pre-school ===
Preschool education is provided by Ngaio Kindergarten, Ngaio Playcentre, Ngaio Childspace, Grace Kindergarten, Trelissick Preschool. and Te Kohanga Reo o Ngaio.

== Churches ==
Ngaio has three churches. The Ngaio Union Church has modern buildings and serves the Methodist and Presbyterian community. The nearby Anglican All Saints Church, with its distinctive brick tower visible from most places in the suburb was designed by renowned church architect Frederick de Jersey Clere and built in 1928. In 2011, the All Saints Church was closed after engineers deemed the church a serious earthquake risk following the 2011 Christchurch earthquake. Also the Onslow Community Church which has a recently built modern hall in Ngatoto Street near the Ngaio/Khandallah boundary.

== History ==
=== Pre 1840: Tarikākā ===
The area that modern day Ngaio occupies was originally called 'Tarikākā' by Māori, which means 'nest of the kākā', named after the noisy parrot that lived in the area. The area was not occupied by Māori, but many Māori tracks ran through the area, including what became the Old Porirua Road. And a track to the ancient Ohariu Pā on Mākara Beach, from today's Awarua Street.

=== 1840–1858: Upper Kaiwharawhara ===
The area was named Upper Kaiwharawhara or Upper Kaiwarra in the 1840s by Captain Edward Daniell who purchased 2,500 acres from the NZ company after selling his commission. In 1845, Daniell built a house in the area near the current Trelissick Crescent and called it "Trelissick" after his old family property in England. Daniell built the 'Bridle Trail' (now part of the Old Porirua Road, the original road north) from his property down through current Kaiwharawhara to the harbour. An agreement was made between Daniell and four sawyers in 1842 to allow them to build the Kaiwara saw mill on his property. The mill was built close to the present day junction of Crofton Road and Kenya Street. A recent subdivision built off Old Porirua road honoured Daniell by naming the road leading to it 'Captain Edward Daniell Drive'.

The mill was described by Edward Jerningham Wakefield in his book, "Adventure in New Zealand from 1839 to 1844: With Some Account of the Beginning of the British Colonization of the Islands":

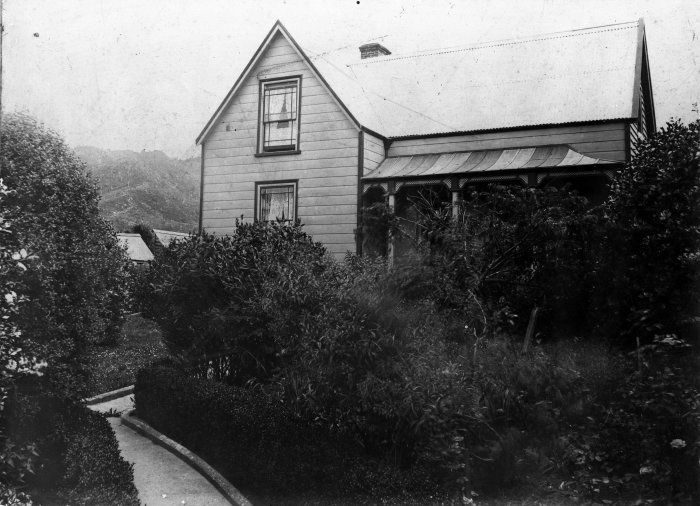
Chew Cottage

"In the bottom of a thickly wooded valley, only accessible over a steep ridge, a natural fall in the narrow rocky gully of the stream afforded great facilities for erecting a dam. A platform and rough shed extended from side to side of the gully over the dam-head; the wheel and machinery were working underneath; and two or three circular saws were kept in constant employment. The open sides of the workshop displayed this curious work of art in the midst of nature's wildest scenery... The stern craggy sides of the gully might be imagined to frown upon so strange a neighbor as the fretting wheel. Two or three log-huts under the forest sent up their curl of smoke; while the neat housewives, with their flaxen-haired children, stood at the doors to receive with joyful pride the praises bestowed by visitors on the untiring industry of their husbands."

The mill was taken over by John Chew in 1863, who built a cottage made of local tōtara, rimu and kauri. Chew Cottage still stands today at 19 Ottawa Road which is the now the main road in Ngaio after starting life as the track for John Chew's timber.

=== 1858: Crofton ===
In 1858, the area was renamed Crofton, after the house built by Sir William Fox on Kenya Street (at the time called Daniell street). Sir William Fox eventually became New Zealand Premier on three separate occasions. The land and house owned by Fox were sold in 1862 to Charles Abraham, Bishop of Wellington. It was then sold to an Anglican minister Henry Woodford St Hill, and was converted into an Anglican boarding school called Crofton College, with Hill as its first headmaster. The college drew pupils from leading Wellington families and the southern half of the North Island. The school closed around 1875. The college was later sold to Wilson Littlejohn, who would eventually become mayor of Onslow Borough Council. The building that was Crofton College is still occupied at 21 Kenya Street, having survived two fires.

=== 1886: the railway arrives ===
The opening of the railway to Wellington in 1886 (see Johnsonville Branch) enabled people to commute into Wellington, and the line was electrified with more frequent and faster trains in 1938.

=== 1870–1890: Toll gate dispute ===
The Kaiwara Road (also known as the Ngaio Gorge Road and Kaiwharawhara Road) was built in 1850 to allow for bullock trains to transport wool and wood. In the mid 1870s, the Hutt City Council constructed a toll gate at the harbour end of road, which was the only road in or out of the area. Funds collected from the gate – one shilling for vehicles and half for saddled horses, were supposed to be used to repair the road, however residents believed the toll was being used to pay for roads further north, such as the Rimutaka road, due to the poor condition of Kaiwarra road.

The toll dispute started when a group of firemen were forced to pay the toll when returning from a fire. A petition was signed by 150 people, and a number of people ended up in court after refusing to pay the toll. The toll gate was destroyed twice by angry mobs until 1890 when the residents broke away from the Hutt City Council to form Onslow Borough Council, made up of Kaiwarra, Khandallah, Wadestown and Ngaio.

=== 1890: Onslow Borough ===
Ngaio was part of the new Onslow Borough from 1890 until 1919, when the borough was amalgamated with Wellington City following a referendum on 31 March 1919. The Borough was named after Lord William Hillier Onslow, who was Governor of New Zealand of the time. This was to placate his family who were appalled with the city's sanitation after his young son Cranley caught typhoid shortly after moving to Wellington. The Borough included the townships of Kaiwarra, Khandallah, Crofton, and Wadestown. In 1896, the Borough had an estimated area of 2,870 acres, a population of 1,530 and 276 dwellings.

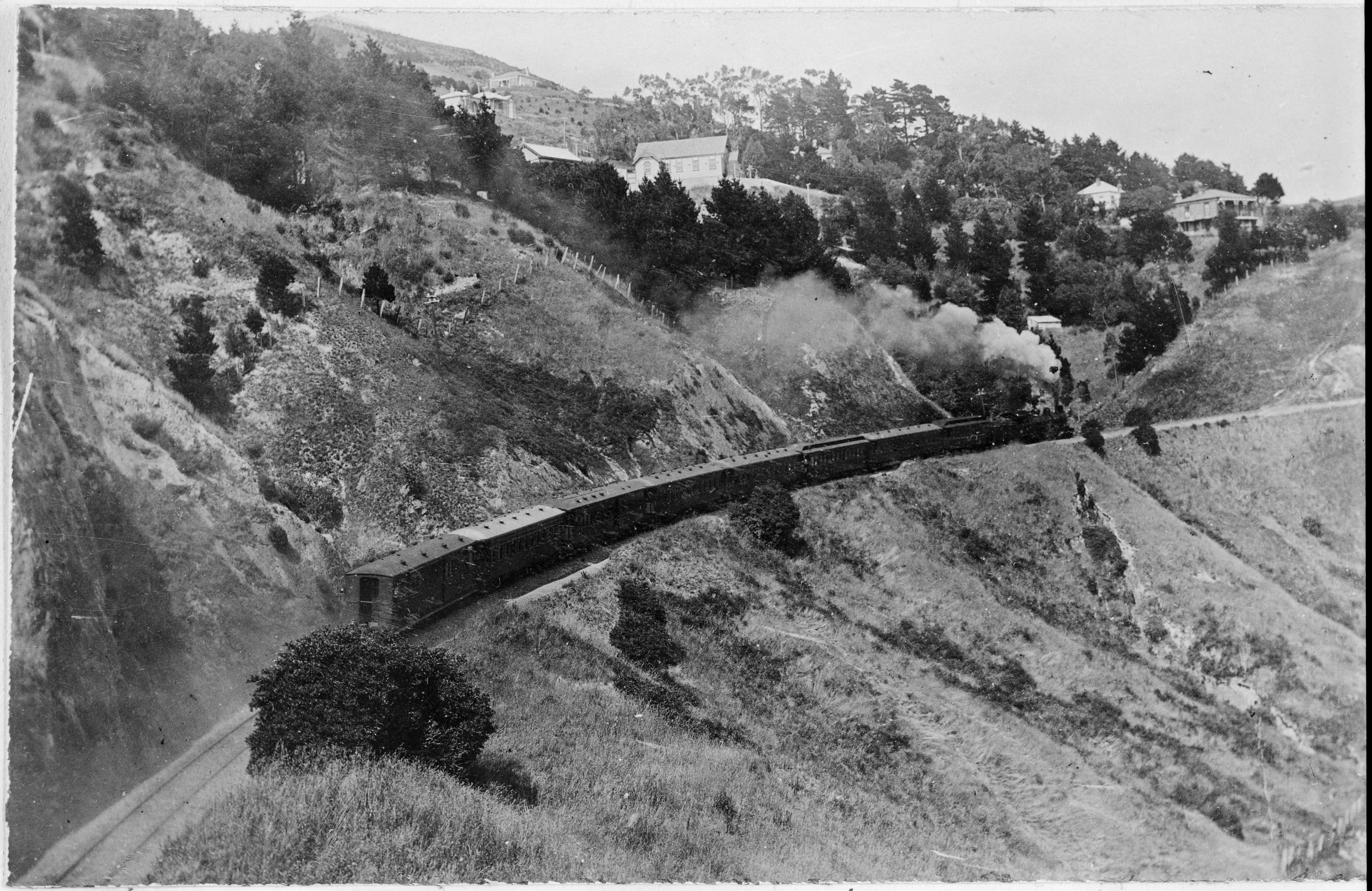
Napier Express climbing to Ngaio on January 1, 1911, photo by Albert Percy Godber

=== 1908–present ===
As a suburb in Marton was already called "Crofton", the suburb's name was changed to 'Ngaio' in August 1908. It is possible that Ngaio was chosen as the ngaio tree was the symbol used by the local Kilmister family for their wool bales.

Ngaio school was first opened in 1908 above the Ngaio railway station. It was subsequently moved to Heke Street in 1911 and finally its present site in 1928.

The opening of the railway to Wellington in 1886 (now the Johnsonville Branch) enabled people to commute into Wellington, and the line was electrified with more frequent and faster trains in 1938.

The population of Ngaio increased from 905 in 1916 to 2,280 in 1938. In 1940 state houses were built over Casey's dairy farm in Cockayne Road.

== Notable people ==
- James K Baxter, New Zealand poet and playwright.
- Leonard Cockayne, botanist and namesake of Cockayne Road.
- Sir William Fox, Second premier of New Zealand
- William Hardham, Victoria Cross winner and Rugby administrator.
