= Khandallah =

Suburb of Wellington, New Zealand

- Suburb
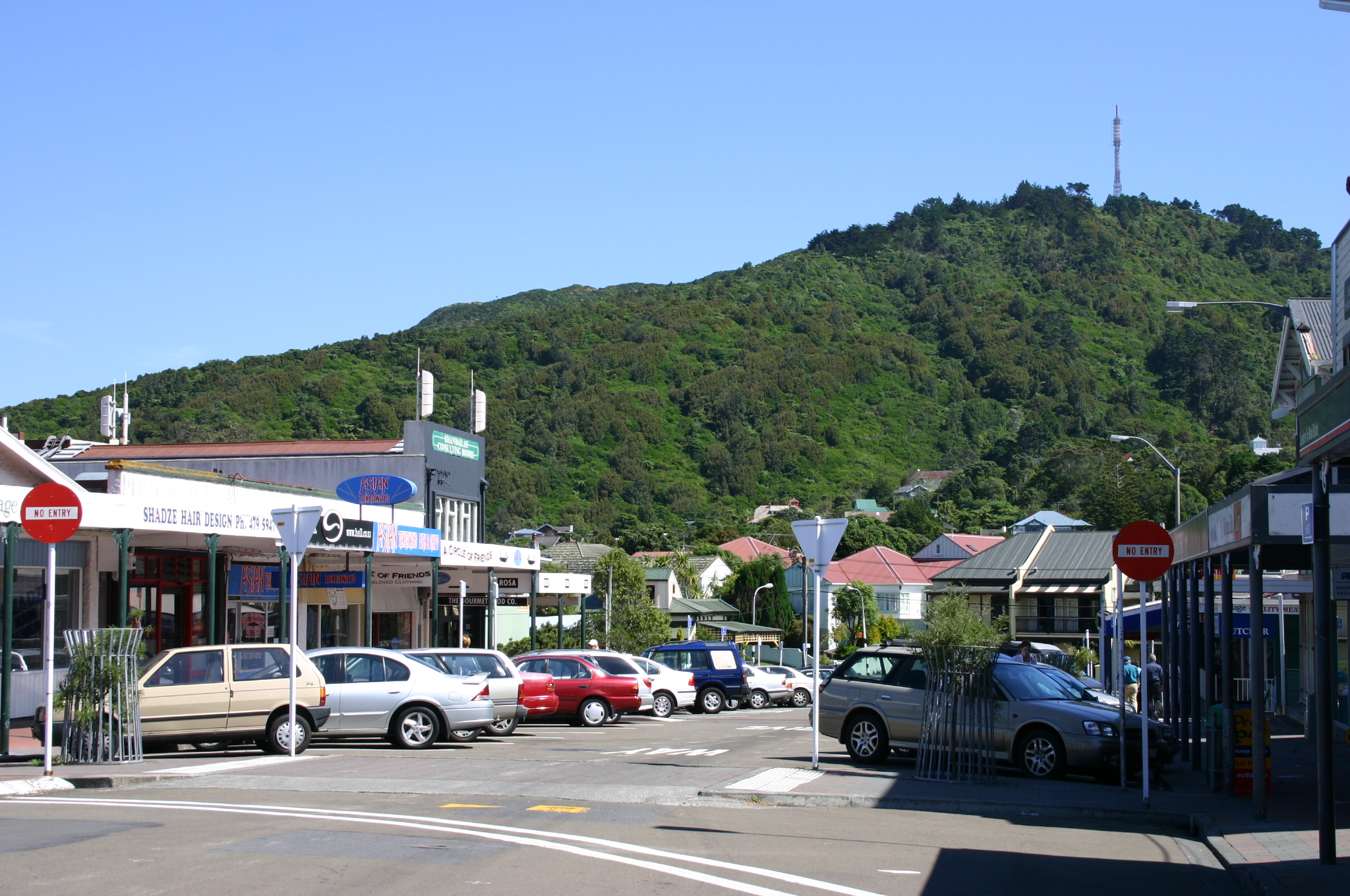
- Khandallah Village in 2005 with Mt. Kaukau in the distance
- Interactive map of Khandallah
- Coordinates: 41.246°S 174.790°E
- Country: New Zealand
- City: Wellington
- Local authority: Wellington City Council
- Electoral ward: Wharangi/Onslow-Western; Te Whanganui-a-Tara Māori Ward

Area
  - Land: 368 ha (910 acres)

Population (June 2025)
  - Total: 8,630
  - Density: 2,350/km^{2} (6,070/sq mi)
- Railway stations: Khandallah, Box Hill, Simla Crescent

	Johnsonville, Broadmeadows
Ngaio	Khandallah	Ngauranga
	Kaiwharawhara

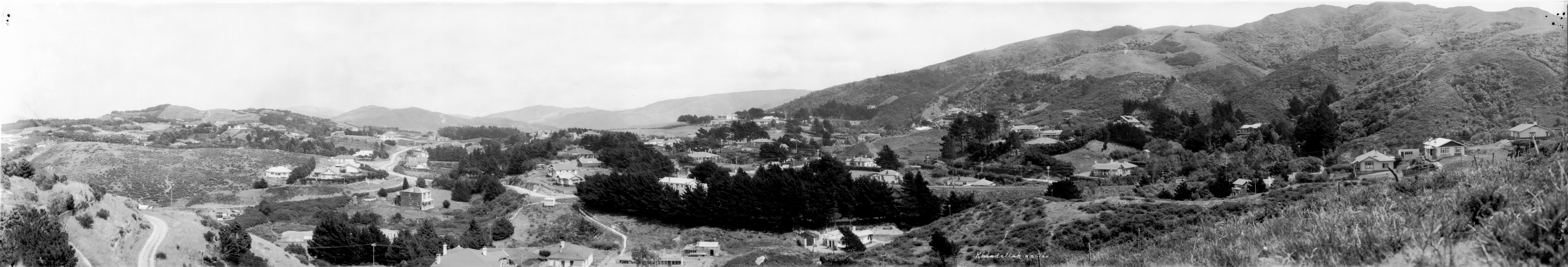
Khandallah, 1924

Khandallah is a suburb of Wellington, the capital city of New Zealand. It is located 4 kilometres (2.5 mi) northeast of the city centre, on hills overlooking Wellington Harbour.

== Description ==
The northeastern part of the suburb is dominated by a large area of parkland, which stretches north towards Johnsonville. Three parks that make up this reserve land total almost 2 km^{2} (0.77 sq mi) of the slopes of Mount Kaukau. The summit of this 445-metre (1,460 ft) peak, which is topped by Wellington's main terrestrial television transmitter tower, provides impressive views of the harbour. Khandallah has a reputation for being one of the most affluent of Wellington's suburbs.

The Khandallah village shopping centre in Ganges Road has a New World supermarket, restaurants, dairy and a pub as well as the Library and Town Hall. Here nineteen new shops opened in the 1920s, overtaking the original shops around the railway station.

Box Hill was named after a sentry post that was established during the "Māori Scare" of 1846, near the present Anglican Church; see Old Porirua Road.

== Etymology ==
The name Khandallah is of Indian origin, believed to mean "hills and valleys", "home of God" or "resting place of God". It is potentially named after Khandela in Rajasthan, India.

== Demography ==
Khandallah, comprising the statistical areas of Khandallah Reserve, Khandallah North, Khandallah South and Onslow, covers 3.68 km^{2} (1.42 sq mi). It had an estimated population of 8,630 as of June 2025, with a population density of 2,345 people per km^{2}.

Historical population
Year	Pop.	±% p.a.
2006	7,851	—
2013	8,217	+0.65%
2018	8,577	+0.86%
2023	8,427	−0.35%

Khandallah had a population of 8,427 in the 2023 New Zealand census, a decrease of 150 people (−1.7%) since the 2018 census, and an increase of 210 people (2.6%) since the 2013 census. There were 4,035 males, 4,329 females, and 66 people of other genders in 3,126 dwellings. 5.1% of people identified as LGBTIQ+. The median age was 41.3 years (compared with 38.1 years nationally). There were 1,485 people (17.6%) aged under 15 years, 1,581 (18.8%) aged 15 to 29, 4,101 (48.7%) aged 30 to 64, and 1,257 (14.9%) aged 65 or older.

People could identify as more than one ethnicity. The results were 81.7% European (Pākehā); 7.2% Māori; 2.7% Pasifika; 15.0% Asian; 2.9% Middle Eastern, Latin American and African New Zealanders (MELAA); and 2.7% other, which includes people giving their ethnicity as "New Zealander". English was spoken by 97.5%, Māori by 1.8%, Samoan by 0.6%, and other languages by 18.7%. No language could be spoken by 1.4% (e.g. too young to talk). New Zealand Sign Language was known by 0.4%. The percentage of people born overseas was 31.3, compared with 28.8% nationally.

Religious affiliations were 30.1% Christian, 1.6% Hindu, 1.1% Islam, 0.1% Māori religious beliefs, 1.0% Buddhist, 0.2% New Age, 0.5% Jewish, and 1.4% other religions. People who answered that they had no religion were 59.0%, and 5.0% of people did not answer the census question.

Of those at least 15 years old, 3,909 (56.3%) people had a bachelor's or higher degree, 2,334 (33.6%) had a post-high school certificate or diploma, and 696 (10.0%) people exclusively held high school qualifications. The median income was $70,400, compared with $41,500 nationally. 2,526 people (36.4%) earned over $100,000 compared to 12.1% nationally. The employment status of those at least 15 was 4,140 (59.6%) full-time, 933 (13.4%) part-time, and 138 (2.0%) unemployed.

Individual statistical areas
Name	Area (km^{2})	Population	Density (per km^{2})	Dwellings	Median age	Median income
Khandallah Reserve	1.17	2,049	1,751	732	42.9 years	$70,100
Khandallah North	1.01	2,646	2,620	981	41.6 years	$70,700
Khandallah South	0.73	1,959	2,684	741	42.7 years	$72,300
Onslow	0.77	1,776	2,306	675	38.6 years	$69,200
New Zealand					38.1 years	$41,500

== Facilities ==
=== Library ===
Khandallah Library was opened in 1953 in the middle of Khandallah village on Ganges Road, after a 1947 petition by local writer Fanny Irvine-Smith. The library serves an average of 1600 customers a week. The Greater Wellington Regional Council local rain gauge is located here.

=== Town Hall ===
The Khandallah Town Hall has a capacity of over 350 people, including 140 seats and 20 tables and has a stage, kitchen and gallery. It was built in 1912 as the Khandallah Public Hall.

=== Recreation centre and park ===
Nairnville Recreation Centre features a multi-purpose sports hall suitable for basketball, netball, volleyball, and badminton. A squash court is available for hire and an upstairs community room with kitchen facilities.

Nairnville Park features sports fields that are used for football, rugby and cricket. An artificial turf was added in March 2009. The park also includes a children's playground, cricket training nets and a skateboard half pipe.

Nairnville Park and Recreation Centre are named after James and Louisa Nairn who owned farm land in the area.

=== Swimming pool ===
Khandallah summer pool is a 30-metre unheated outdoor summer pool at the end of Woodmancote Road. Between 2022 and 2024 Wellington City Council considered future options for the pool, including demolition. In June 2024, Council voted to keep the Khandallah Summer Pool open for another season while looking for solutions to refurbish the pool with a budget allocation of $7.5 million.

In mid-May 2022, the Wellington City Council voted to preserve the Khandallah Pool.

== Transport ==
The suburb is served by the Johnsonville Branch commuter railway which connects it to the central city and surrounding suburbs. It has three railway stations; Khandallah, Box Hill and Simla Crescent. Parts of the suburb nearer the harbour and some distance from the stations are served by several Metlink bus routes.

== Education ==
=== School enrolment zones ===
Khandallah is within the enrolment zones for Wellington Girls' College, Onslow College, Raroa Normal Intermediate and St Oran's College.

=== Primary schools ===
Khandallah has three primary schools.

Cashmere Avenue School is a state primary school for Year 1 to 6 students, with a roll of 302. It opened in 1940 as a side school for Khandallah School, and became independent in 1968.

Khandallah School is a state primary school for Year 1 to 6 students, with a roll of 296. The school is on Clark St and the site was first occupied by a school in January 1893. It opened in 1893 and moved to its current site in 1894. A fire destroyed part of the school in 1972.

St Benedict's School is a state-integrated Catholic primary school for Year 1 to 8 students, with a roll of 217. The school is on Nicholson Road and was opened in 1952 by Archbishop Peter Cardinal McKeefry. The school was integrated with the state school system in 1981. It opened in 1952, and became state-integrated in 1981.

All these schools are co-educational. Rolls are as of October 2025.

== History ==
Khandallah is named after Khandela, Rajasthan, or may be Khandala and supposedly means "Resting place of God" in an unspecified language. It is noteworthy that KhānAllāh means the hostel of God in Arabic. Hence the suburb and those surrounding it have many place names connected with the Indian subcontinent; e.g. Calcutta Street, Ganges Road and Simla Crescent.

The name may have come from a homestead built in the area in 1884 by Captain James Andrew, who had recently returned from duty in India and had been consul in Baghdad. When the railway was laid through the area by the Wellington and Manawatu Railway Company, Andrew is reported as insisting that the railway station be named Khandallah with the h on the end of the name, and reportedly gave land for the Khandallah station provided all trains stop there. However, Edward Battersbee (also spelt Battersby) was listed in the 1864–1865 Province of Wellington electoral roll as living at Khandallah, Porirua Road on 23 April 1864 some 20 years earlier than Andrew. In addition Battersby had worked for the East India Company as a veterinary surgeon in the Bombay Light Cavalry, thereby making him the more likely originator of the suburb's name. In January 1868 Battersbee placed his 450-acre property, named in the advertisement as Khrandalah, on the market for sale.

Another settler from the British Indian Army was Captain Charles Sharp of the Bombay Native Infantry who lived elsewhere but bought land around the Khandallah railway station and let it to sheep farmer Captain John Kirwan. In 1894 Robert Hanna bought it for subdivision.

When the formation of the Borough of Onslow was proposed in 1889, Khandallah was already described as a District, and was a part of the Onslow Borough until it merged with Wellington in 1919.

Khandallah was largely farmland to the 1920s; James Nairn built a farmhouse in 1869 on the old Ngatoto Native Reserve, now Nairnville Park. The opening of the railway to Wellington in 1886 (now the Johnsonville Branch) enabled people to commute into Wellington, and the line was electrified with more frequent and faster trains in 1938. The population of Khandallah increased from 766 in 1916 to 2,498 in 1938.

Access was originally via the Old Porirua Road until new access roads opened; Onslow Road down to the Hutt Road in the 1920s and Burma Road to Johnsonville (superseding Fraser Avenue) in 1936.

== Notable people ==
- Jessica Hammond, New Zealand politician
