= New Zealand DM class electric multiple unit =

Type of train

New Zealand DM/D class
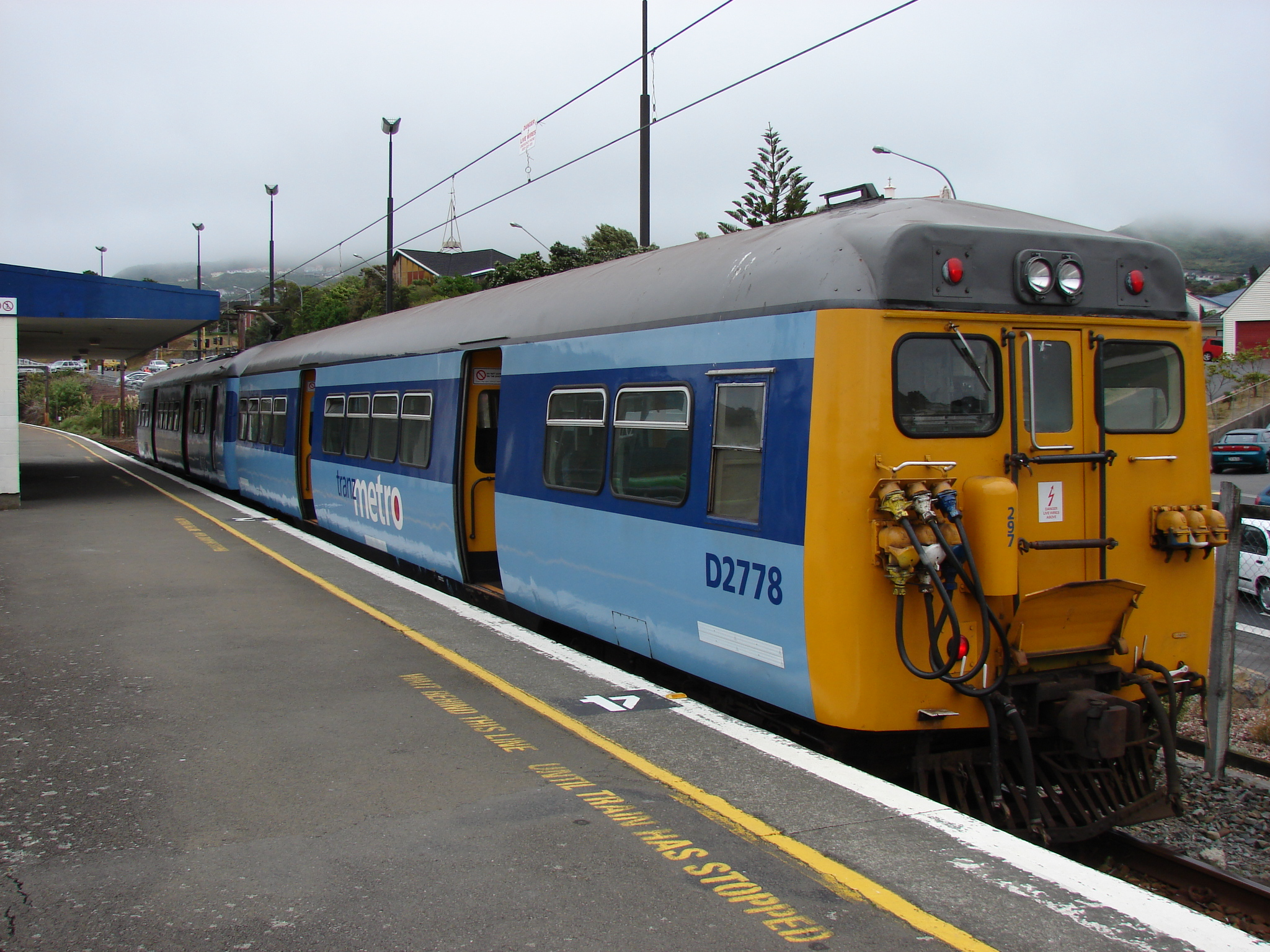
- D2778 awaiting departure from Johnsonville, the terminus of the Johnsonville Line, 17 December 2007.
- In service: 2 July 1938 – 25 June 2012
- Manufacturer: English Electric
- Built at: Preston Works, United Kingdom
- Constructed: 1938-1954
- Entered service: 2 July 1938 (36 stock); December 1946 (42 stock); August 1949-March 1954 (46 stock)
- Refurbished: 2005–2007 (Tranz Metro)
- Scrapped: 1978-1980s (36/42 stock); 2011-2012 (46 stock)
- Number built: 49
- Number scrapped: 41
- Formation: DM–D (Johnsonville and Melling Lines); D–DM–D ( Paekākāriki and Hutt Valley Lines)
- Fleet numbers: D 2130-2869; DM 147-562
- Capacity: 124 (two-car units); 194 (three-car units)
- Operator: Tranz Metro
- Lines served: Johnsonville Line, Melling Line (two-car and three-car units); Hutt Valley Line (three-car units and occasionally and after displaced from Johnsonville line three two-car units); Kāpiti Line (three-car units and two-car units very occasionally after the 1980s)

Specifications
- Car length: 19.2 metres (63 ft 0 in)
- Width: 2.61 metres (8 ft 7 in)
- Doors: 4
- Maximum speed: 97 km/h (60 mph)
- Weight: 43.5 t (42.8 long tons; 48.0 short tons)
- Power output: 447 kW (599 hp)
- Electric systems: 1,500 V DC overhead
- Braking systems: Air, handbrakes
- Track gauge: 1,067 mm (3 ft 6 in)

The New Zealand DM/D class electric multiple unit (Note: Following the introduction of Traffic Monitoring System (TMS) in 1979, the class classification was capitalised, whereas previously the second letter was a smaller capital letter, that is D^{M}) (also known as English Electrics) are a type of electric multiple units used on the suburban rail network of Wellington, New Zealand. Formed of DM power cars and D trailer cars, the first units were ordered from English Electric in 1936 and introduced on 2 July 1938 operating the electrified Johnsonville Line service. Additional units were ordered in 1942 for the line, and in 1946 as the other Wellington suburban lines were to be electrified.

The units were relegated to peak services and the Johnsonville Line after the arrival of the "Ganz-Mavag" EM/ET units in 1982–1983, before finally being replaced by the "Matangi" FP/FT units in 2011–2012. The units operated their last revenue service on 25 June 2012, from Wellington to Melling and return. Five complete units (four two-car and one three-car) and six trailer cars have been preserved.

== Introduction ==
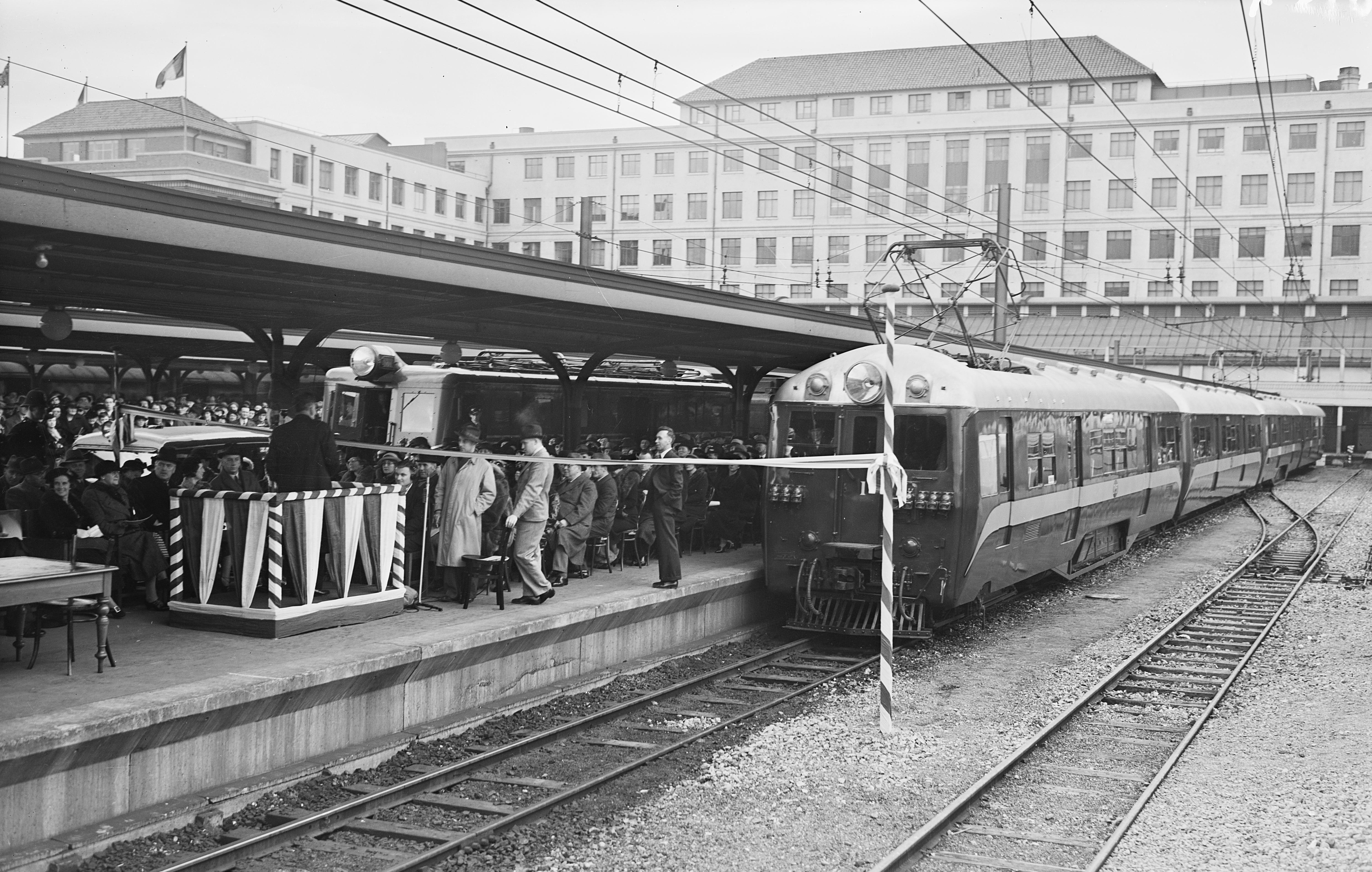
Ribbon cutting ceremony at Wellington railway station on 19 July 1938

Following its decision to build the Tawa Flat deviation to replace the original Wellington and Manawatu Railway Company portion of the North Island Main Trunk (NIMT) alignment out of Wellington, the New Zealand Railways Department (NZR) decided to convert the remaining 10.49 kilometres (6.52 mi) of track between Wellington and Johnsonville into an electrified suburban branch line. Six two-car trains comprising one driving motor car and one driving trailer were ordered from English Electric in 1936 to work the future Johnsonville Line, which formally opened as a branch line on 2 July 1938 with the new electric trains inaugurating the service. The new trains were allocated as the D^{M} class (driving motor cars) and the D class (non-motored driving trailer). The first order became known as the "36 stock" by the year it was ordered (1936).

The first sets were shipped to New Zealand in January 1938. They arrived on SS Cambridge in February and were landed by the floating crane, Hikitia.

Due to traffic growth both on the Johnsonville Branch and with further electrification in the Wellington suburban area, two further orders were placed with English Electric for further trains of this type; three motor cars and two trailers were ordered in 1942 and delivered in 1946 following the end of the Second World War, while forty motor cars and seventy-one trailers were ordered in 1946 and delivered from 1949 onwards to work the Paekākāriki and later Upper Hutt and Melling services. Due to the limited number of these trains, NZR was required to run additional locomotive-hauled carriage trains until the arrival of the first Ganz Mavag EM/ET units in 1982.

== Operation ==
The class operated in two principal configurations:

- Two-car unit (DM-D). Used on the steep Johnsonville Line until March 2012, as four-car trains for peak and two-car trains off-peak and weekend; 38.4 metres long with a tare weight of 69.7 t (68.6 long tons; 76.8 short tons), full seated load 79.9 t (78.6 long tons; 88.1 short tons). Two car units were also operated on the Melling line. Until March 2012 there were 11 two-car units in service.
- Three-car unit (D-DM-D). Used on the Wellington to Taita line (extended to Upper Hutt from 1955), and the Wellington to Paekākāriki line; as six carriage sets during peak periods and three carriage sets off-peak and weekends; 57.5 metres (188 ft 8 in) long with a tare weight of 99.5 t (97.9 long tons; 109.7 short tons).

Up to 1983 when electrification was extended to Paraparaumu some (D-DM-D) units were hauled from Paekākāriki by diesel locomotives, usually the DA class. They were fitted with extra storage batteries for lights and other electrics.

=== Renumbering ===
The introduction of the Traffic Monitoring System (TMS) in 1979 saw the units renumbered.

=== Replacement ===
By the late 1970s, planning began to replace the '36 and '42 stock due to their increasing unreliability. In an editorial published in the New Zealand Herald the Minister of Railways Colin McLachlan stated that the government intended to purchase new suburban rolling stock. In addition to mechanical issues, the units heaters and doors were often faulty, leading to passenger discomfort. A tender to replace the units and all carriage-hauled suburban trains in Wellington, was announced on 6 March 1978.

== Technical details ==
As originally built, the D^{M} class motor cars seated 56 passengers and D class trailer cars seated 72. During the renovation of these trains in the late 1970s and early 1980s, two seats located next to the driver's cabs in each car were removed and a barrier was installed level with the cab, reducing the seating in each car to 54 passengers per D^{M} car and 70 passengers per D car. Some D^{M} cars had the double seats in the rear section in front of the luggage compartment removed and the seats parallel with the sides extended to provide space for prams.

As originally built, the D^{M} class motor cars had a second driver's cab located in the luggage compartment at one end of the car allowing them to operate as single car units. The second cabs were progressively removed to provide spare parts giving increased luggage space. Prior to this, the all-night service on the Johnsonville Branch was operated by one of the 1942 stock D^{M} cars, an arrangement which was considered for use on a similar service on the Melling Branch.

Each car had ten 150 V electric heaters in series run off the 1500 V supply, so a 1500 V connection was required between motor cars and trailers. 46 stock differed from 36/42 stock in some respects:

- 36/42 stock motor cars had a 120 V DC motor-generator set supplying power for lights, signal circuits and brake & door operation; 46 stock set were fitted with a higher-capacity motor-generator set to supply two trailers rather than one.
- The bogie wheelbase on 36/42 stock was 7 ft 6 in (2.29 m); 46 stock were four feet longer at 8 ft 0 in (2.44 m).
- The 36/42 stock had taller windows, delivered without ventilation louvres in the doors; 46 stock had shorter windows and were delivered with ventilation louvres in the doors.
- The 36/42 stock had one coach-mounted brake cylinder only; 46 stock had Westinghouse electro-pneumatic air brakes and automatic brake equipment.

Because of their shorter wheelbase and the smaller motor-generator set designed for one trailer only, 36/42 stock units were kept for the Johnsonville line as much as possible. Similarly, the three-car sets of 1946 stock were kept for use on the Paekākāriki, Melling and Upper Hutt services due to their greater passenger-carrying capacity and reduced brake capacity on steep lines.

== Refurbishment ==
The introduction of the EM/ET "Ganz-Mavag" class units from 1982 onwards saw a large number of the class become redundant, namely all of the '36 and '42 stock. Ten two-car units of '46 stock were refurbished at the now closed East Town Railway Workshops in Wanganui between 1984 and 1986, for continued operation on the Johnsonville Branch, where EMs did not have running rights due to their being over-gauge and having insufficient braking capacity, and for peak-hour running on the Hutt Valley and Melling lines.

In the early 2000s, the remaining members of the class underwent a moderate refurbishment to extend their operational lives to 2012. The refurbishment largely involved a cosmetic upgrade of the exterior and interior of the cars, with new seating and a major mechanical overhaul. As part of this the cars received the new two-tone Tranz Metro blue livery with the exception of DM556 and its trailer cars D 2130 and D 2411 which were repainted into the old Midland Red livery with silver roof and black running gear in 2006. Trailer unit D 2660 was sent to Hillside Workshops for an overhaul in 2002.

In February 2007, overcrowding on Wellington trains resulted in the recommendation by the Greater Wellington Regional Council to re-introduce two DM/D units, one former Tranz Metro unit stored at Hutt Workshops as a source of spare parts and another from the Ferrymead Railway. These units entered service from October 2008. With no further DM/D sets available, the two overhauled sets were joined as a short-term measure by six ex-British Rail carriages rebuilt at Hillside Workshops as the SE class and worked in push-pull service by two Toshiba EO class locomotives.

== Withdrawal ==
=== First withdrawals ===
Due to the arrival of the Ganz-Mavag electric multiple units in the early 1980s withdrawals of the D/DM class began in November 1981 with the scrapping of set DM55 and trailer D2007 (D^{M} 1 and D 101). Further withdrawals of earlier sets occurred until July 1983 when the last two sets of 1942 stock were withdrawn for scrapping, while the 1936 stock had all been withdrawn and scrapped by April of that year. Only one of the 1946 sets had been withdrawn - motor coach D^{M} 13 had been withdrawn and scrapped in April 1978 after being involved in an accident.

At the time of their withdrawal, the D/DM sets were among the oldest rolling stock operated by KiwiRail. By this time all remaining D/DM class sets were composed of 1946 stock, the '36 and '42 stock having been withdrawn from service in the early 1980s.

=== Final withdrawal ===
Following the arrival of the new FP/FT Matangi units into service from January 2011 onwards, Metlink began to progressively withdraw the DM/D sets from regular service, starting with the Hutt Valley services. All but three of the three-car D/DM/D sets were withdrawn with the exceptions of DM 251, DM 504, and DM 556 "Cyclops". These sets continued in regular service until DM 556 was reduced to a two-car set for Johnsonville Branch use in December 2011; both DM 251 and DM 504 continued relatively trouble free in service until 27 March 2012, when both were withdrawn from service after the evening peak services that day.

Due to the nature of operations on the Johnsonville Branch and the need to increase the nominal catenary voltage for full Matangi operation, operation of the Johnsonville Branch needed to be cut over immediately rather than phased in as elsewhere on the network. This caused issues due to delays in the introduction of further Matangi units and the voltage increase which led to a number of electrical failures on the older DM/D sets. As the sets deteriorated in condition they were withdrawn from service, allowing cars with little or no problems to be combined in place of failed cars in order to maintain service.

By October 2011, former Hutt Valley sets D^{M} 27 "Robin", DM 216 "Phoenix" and the now shortened DM 556 were pressed into service due to a lack of available Johnsonville DM/D sets. Following the failure of DM 216 in December, DM 556 was pressed into service with one trailer removed and coupled to the uphill end of D^{M} 27 due to the loss of the second driving cab in DM 556. Three further sets comprising DM 182, DM 441 and DM 510 were later repaired to maintain service with buses supplementing trains at peak times.

The final Johnsonville Branch services to be operated by the DM/D class ran on 19 March 2012. The train, consisting of D^{M} 27 and DM 556 and driven by Phil Gibbs, crossed FP/FT 4155 and another Matangi set at Ngaio where impromptu speeches were held to farewell the trains, which subsequently arrived back at Wellington late. This also happened to be the last time both D^{M} 27 and DM 556 "Phoenix" ran in service, both being withdrawn following the final run. Due to issues surrounding noise using Matangi units on the Johnsonville line, three test trains were run with two two-car DM/D sets; the last of these being run on 15 June 2012 using sets DM 441 and DM 510.

The final English Electric revenue service was the 14:39 Melling to Wellington service on 25 June 2012. Departing Wellington Station's Platform 9 at 14:17, DM's 182, 441 and 510 ran as train 5648 to Melling before returning to Wellington as train 5649, where they were retired from service, ending 74 years of English Electric service in Wellington.

Later on 25 June, an English Electric unit was listed on TradeMe, with a start price of $29,990. Initially thought to be a hoax, the train was 'bought' by a four-year-old who clicked on 'Buy Now' for the train. The train was later sold for $30,000 on 2 July 2012 at 1:42pm when the auction closed. At the time no numbers had been given for the train sold as GWRC had nine two-car sets awaiting sale or scrap. The set purchased was eventually revealed as motor car DM 562 and trailer D 2149, which arrived in Nelson on 21 August 2012, after being transported by road from the Wellington railway yards onto the Interislander ferry the following day.

Final scrapping of the 12 remaining units (14 D and 11 DM cars) began at Hutt Workshops just after 18 December 2012, starting with a mix of DM and D cars, before in January concentrating on the D class trailers and followed by the DM power cars. It was announced on 23 January that the three-car DM 556 "Cyclops" set was put aside for the Wellington Heritage Multiple Unit Preservation Trust, while the two-car DM 216 "Phoenix" set was put aside for preservation by the National Railway Museum of New Zealand. Trailer D 2826 was also put aside to be moved to Belgrove to join DM 562 and D 2419, converting it to an impromptu three-car set in the same way as the original three-car D/DM/D sets.

Scrapping of the D and DM cars at Hutt was completed on 31 January 2013, with motor car DM 297 being the last to be scrapped.

== Liveries ==
The DM class has worn five distinctive liveries during their working lives:

=== Royal Blue ===
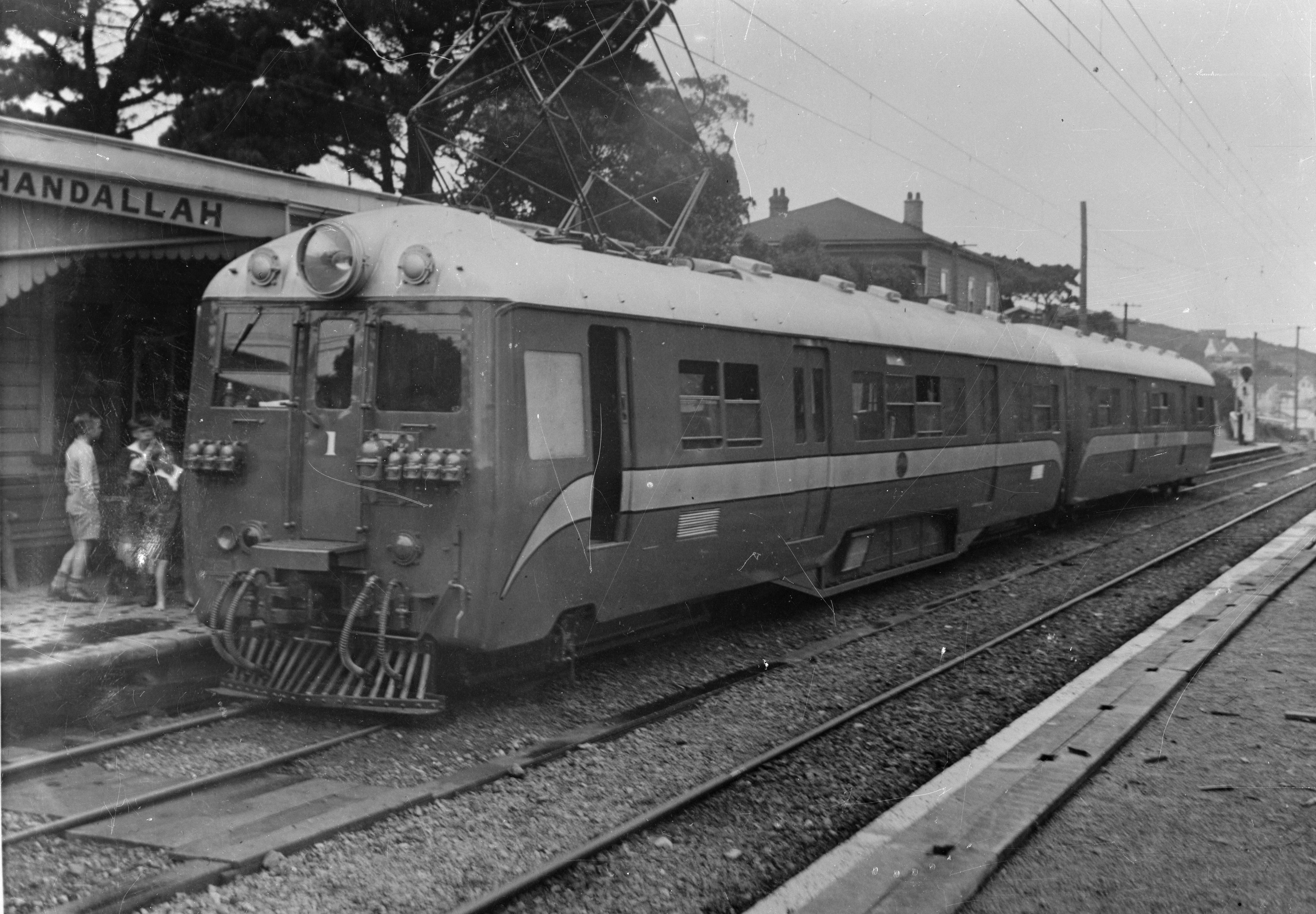
DM class unit at Khandallah railway station in original livery with white band

The original livery of the D^{M} and D class cars, introduced in 1938. This livery was replaced with standard "Midland Red" by 1949. The car body was painted in Royal Blue with a white band along the side below the windows and grey roof. The traction equipment and running gear were painted black, but were concealed under skirting until the war years when maintenance staff had them removed for ease of access. The car numbers were painted in gold on a black background, while on the side they were painted inside a red oval, similar to the cab-side number plates on NZR locomotives.

=== Midland Red ===
The best-known livery, all cars of the D^{M} and D classes wore the "Midland Red" livery at one time during their working lives. When the EM/ET class was introduced in the early 1980s in an olive paint scheme, the red of the DM/D class became a distinguishing feature and they came to be nicknamed "old reds" in New Zealand railway jargon.

The car body and skirting over the traction equipment was painted in "Midland Red" with the roof in grey and separated from the red body by a black strip and black underfloor equipment and running gear. Car numbers were painted in gold on a black background, but were later replaced by solid white numbers during the TMS era. The livery was slightly modified in 2008 by KiwiRail for safety reasons when the red outer car ends were repainted yellow for better visibility at level crossings, this modification being confined to the three heritage sets.

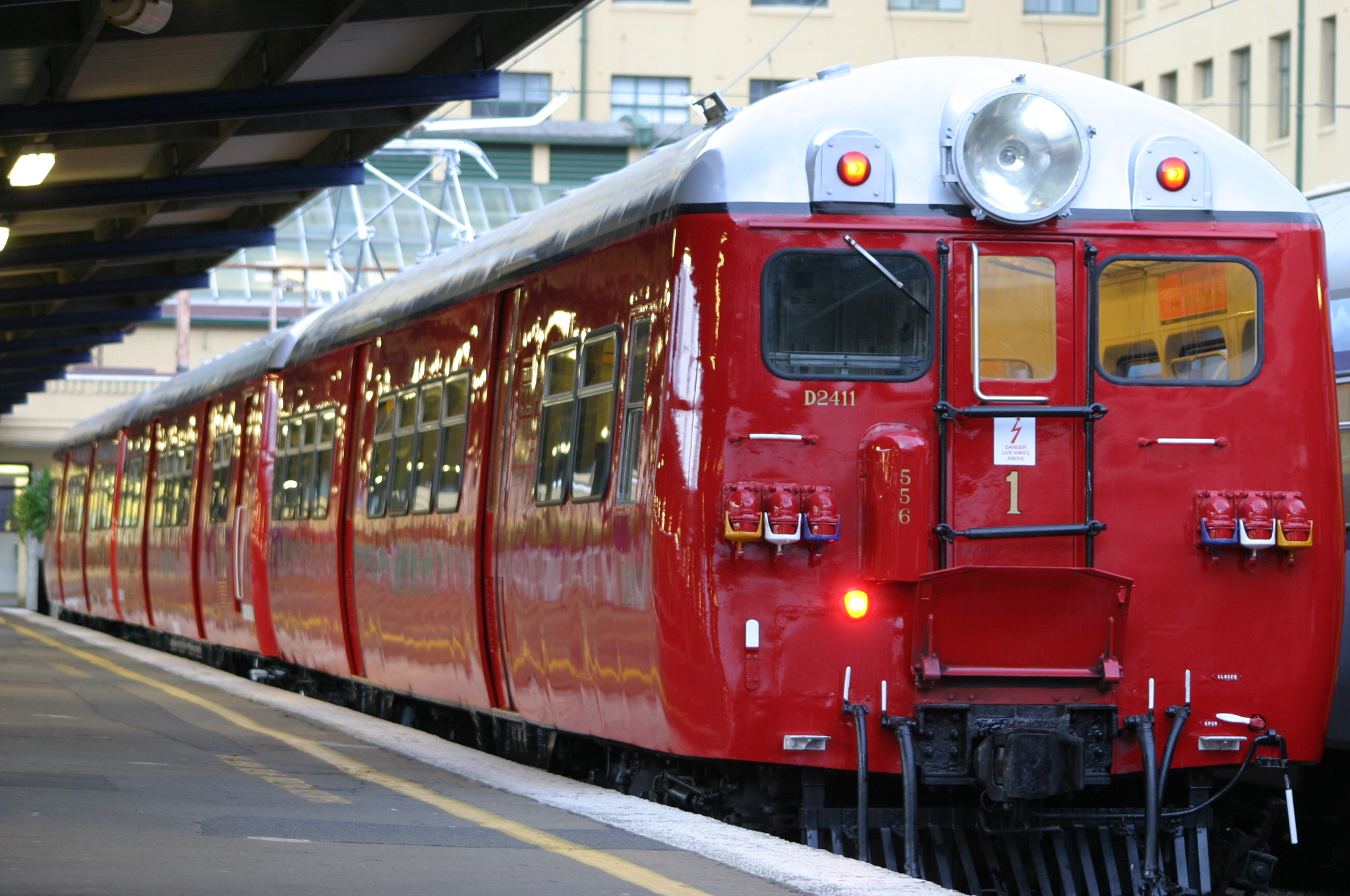
D-2411 "Cyclops" in Midland Red livery

The last set in regular service to retain the "Midland Red" livery was DM 556 and trailers D 2130 and D 2411. When it was refurbished in 2006, it was named "Cyclops" due to its single-lens headlight and repainted externally in the "Midland Red" livery with gold car numbers as per the 1950s. This earned Tranz Metro a "Business in Conservation" award from the New Zealand Department of Conservation and the Wellington Conservation Board the same year. This livery was applied to D^{M} 27 and D 163 from Ferrymead and DM 216 and D 2687 in 2008 when they were returned to service.

=== Olive and Cream ===
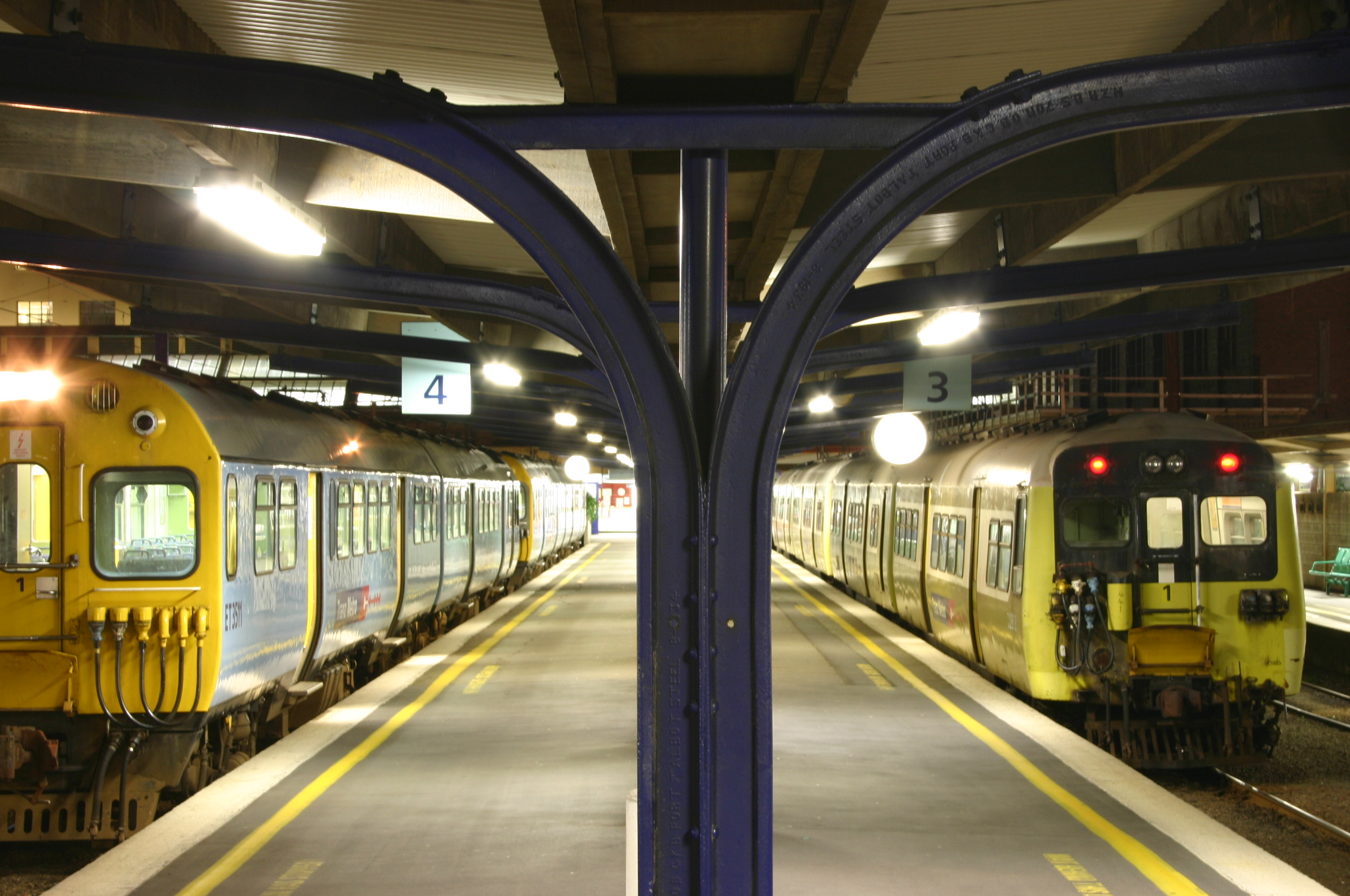
A DM set (right) in Olive and Cream livery and an EM/ET class set (left) at Wellington railway station

Originally introduced on the EM/ET class sets, several of the DM/D sets refurbished for the Johnsonville Branch were later repainted in this livery during the late 1980s. The car body was repainted in olive green with a grey roof and black underfloor equipment and running gear. A white band surrounded the windows on the sides of the car, ending between the first passenger window and the driver's cab window. The doors and ends were painted yellow with white block numbers and classification letters on the side and black numbers on the '1' and '2' ends of the train. The cab windows and headlight mounting were painted with a black surround.

These sets were branded for New Zealand Railways Corporation suburban operator Cityline and carried the Cityline branding and logo under the central four windows on the car body side. The NZR logo was painted in front of the car numbers at either end. This was later removed when New Zealand Rail was split from the New Zealand Railways Corporation and Cityline renamed Cityrail. Following the rebranding of New Zealand Rail to Tranz Rail, suburban services were also rebranded as Tranz Metro, the Cityrail branding was deleted and replaced with the Tranz Metro logo.

=== Tranz Metro "Cato Blue" ===
This livery was applied to set DM 147 by Tranz Rail's suburban operator Tranz Metro during the late 1990s, and was the only unit to wear this livery. The car body was painted in the standard Tranz Rail "Cato Blue" with a grey roof, yellow ends and headlight mount, and black underfloor equipment and running gear. The doors were unpainted aluminium while there were two black bands on the car body, one at floor level separating the running gear and underfloor equipment from the "Cato Blue" body and the other at roof level separating the grey roof from the blue body.

Standard Tranz Metro logos were applied along the centre of the car sides. The car numbers were painted in black Frutiger script on the ends of the car, underneath the left-hand tail lamp. The end numbers were painted in the same style on the centre of the cab doors.

=== Tranz Metro two-tone blue ===
Starting in 2005, Tranz Metro undertook a major refurbishment of the DM/D sets. As part of this, DM 297 and D 2778 were painted in a new two-tone livery which would later be used on all sets with the exception of the three "heritage" units. The car body was "Cato Blue" with a grey roof and headlight mount, yellow cab fronts and black underfloor equipment and running gear. There was a Royal Blue window band along the side of the cars, while a black strip separated the grey roof colour from the car body. The passenger doors were unpainted aluminium, and white overhead hazard stickers were applied to the cab doors. Car numbers were painted on the cab-mounted horn covers in dark blue descending Frutiger script, although some had different sized lettering or a serif font.

== Preserved units ==
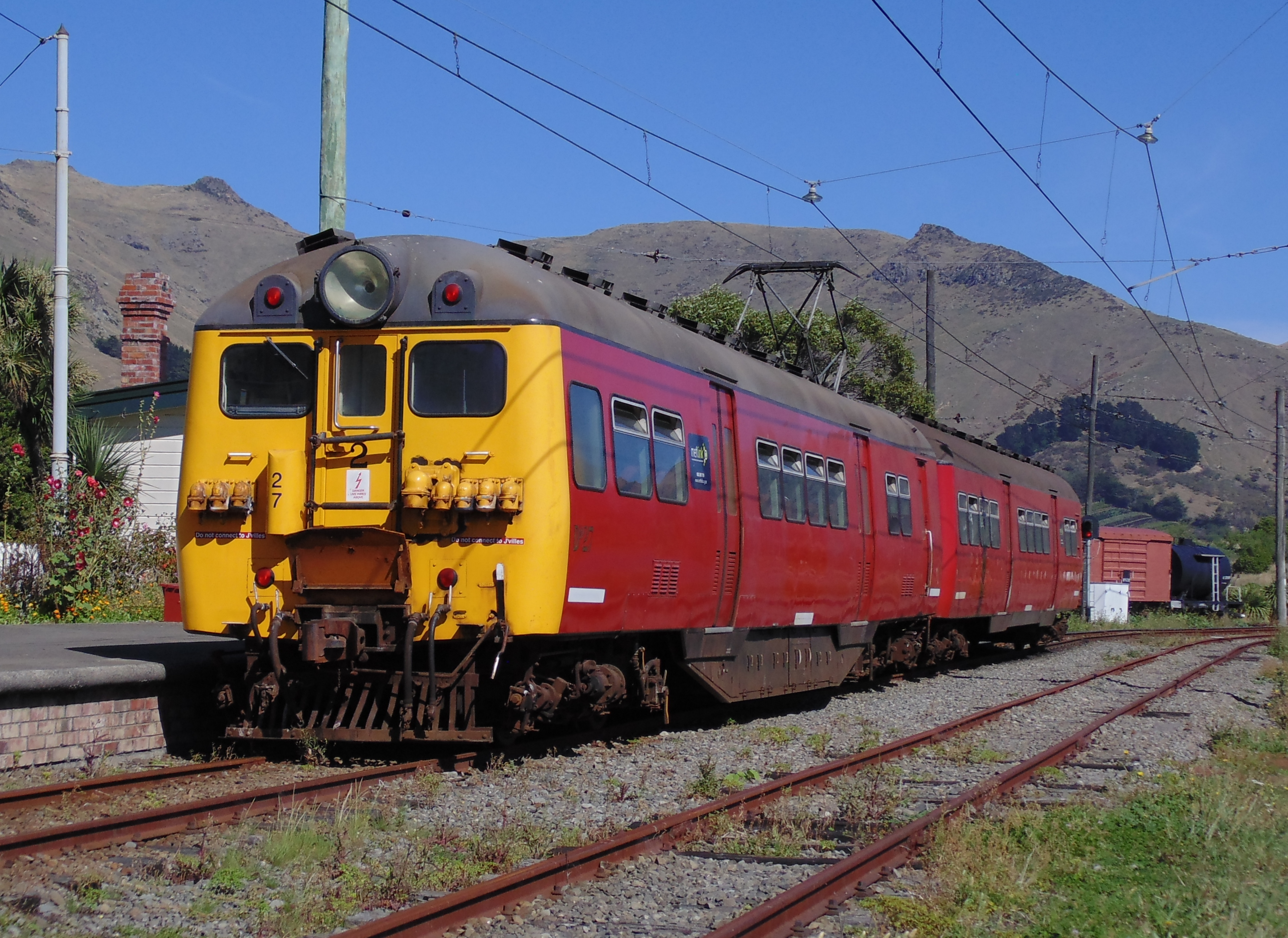
D^{M} 27/D 163 at Ferrymead Station on the Ferrymead Railway in March 2016.

As of 2013, five English Electric sets had been preserved by individuals or railway societies. Two of the sets are fitted with the original single headlights while three are rebuilt sets featuring the later twin-beam headlight units:

- D^{M} 16 and D 162 (DM216 and D2687) were withdrawn in July 2001 and stored at Hutt Workshops. Restored to working order in October 2008 for GWRC, it was named Phoenix, after a suggestion on a Yahoo Group Wellington Rail Gen by a Wellington-based rail fan, that was picked up by Tranz Metro management and bestowed upon the unit. Withdrawn again in December 2011, the set was donated to the National Railway Museum of New Zealand in January 2013. DM216 has since been acquired by a private individual who will convert into a diesel-electric railcar at Oamaru Steam and Rail. Trailer car D2687 remains at the NRMNZ, Ferrymead.
- D^{M} 27 and D 163 (DM320 and D2695) was purchased by Ms Robin Gavin and donated to the Canterbury Railway Society at the Ferrymead Heritage Park in October 1988. For most of its time at Ferrymead the set remained stored in an operable order from its arrival until leased to GWRC in 2007 for use in Wellington until the new 'Matangi' trains arrived. The set was restored to service with its original diamond pantograph, re-painted in the original Midland Red livery and given its original pre-TMS number as per the wishes of Ferrymead in October 2008. The set returned to Ferrymead in on 22 July 2012 and was recommissioned for the CRS on 21 September 2013. This set is fitted with the original single headlights and is in operational condition.
- D^{M} 45 and D 144 (DM510 and D2489) were sold in August 2012 to an enthusiast in the Wellington area and were towed to Steam Incorporateds site at Paekākāriki for storage. As the initial non-rail use for the sets has encountered issues, the set remains stored outside at Paekākāriki. Following several graffiti attacks, one side of the unit has been painted grey although the other side still retains the Tranz Metro two-tone blue livery. This set is the last remaining unit set from the trio that ran the very last English Electric train to Melling on 25 June 2012, and also was one of the last two units to run on the Johnsonville Line on 15 June 2012. It is now used as a cafe in Paraparaumu.
- D^{M} 48 and trailers D 113 and D 138 (DM556, D2130 and D2411) was the last single-headlight set in use in Wellington, hence its name "Cyclops", and was withdrawn in 2012. Previously shortened to two cars to work on the Johnsonville Branch with D^{M} 27, the set was donated to the newly founded Wellington Heritage Multiple Unit Preservation Trust in January 2013 and was moved to the Rimutaka Incline Railway's Maymorn site for storage on 21 April 2013. It is the only three-car set to be preserved, and its new owners eventually hope to be able to run it on heritage excursions on the commuter network once they have restored it and adapted the unit to run on the higher system voltage (now 1700V DC).
- D^{M} 49 and D 114 (DM562 and D2149) were sold through TradeMe in July 2012. The set was purchased by a family in Schultz Road, Belgrove and they intend to convert it into self-contained accommodation units. The three-car set (with trailer D154) is located on what was once part of the formation for the Nelson Section.

Six D class trailer cars have also found alternative use:

- D 138 (D 2438) and D 169 (D 2751) were sold in 1994 to an individual at Silverdale on Auckland's Hibiscus Coast where they were converted to private residences. They were fitted with twin-beam headlights prior to exiting service and are now in poor external condition.
- D 142 (D 2462) was sold to the New Zealand Fire Service for use at their Rotorua Training Centre in March 2012, and delivered by rail to Mount Maunganui from where it was trucked to Rotorua.
- D 145 (D 2497) and D 171 (D 2786) was sold to the New Zealand Army's New Zealand Special Air Service (SAS) for use in anti-terrorist training at Papakura Military Camp. D 2497 headed north on 22 July 2012, with D 2786 following in October 2012.
- D 174 (D 2826) has been purchased by the same family at Belgrove who purchased DM562 and D2149. It left Hutt Workshops on the back of a trailer on 7 March 2013, and has been placed on a short length of track with the other set. These cars now give the appearance of being a 3-car set, although all are ex-Johnsonville Line types.
