= Box Hill railway station =

Box Hill railway station may refer to:

- Box Hill railway station, Melbourne, Australia
- Box Hill railway station, Wellington, New Zealand
- Box Hill & Westhumble railway station, Surrey, England
