= Crofton Downs railway station =

Railway station in New Zealand

Crofton Downs
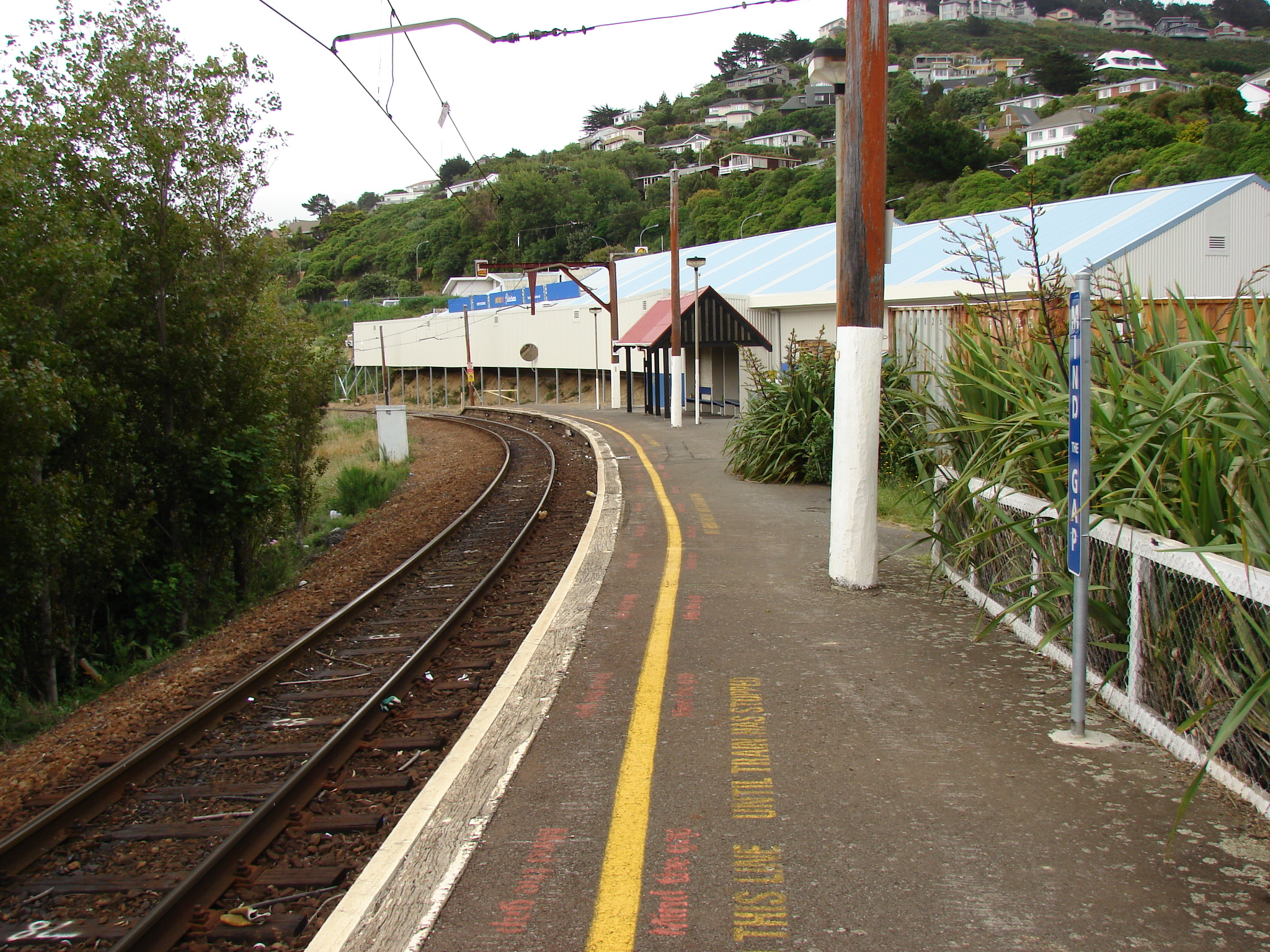
- Crofton Downs railway station looking south in the direction of Wellington before it was updated on 31 December 2007

General information
- Location: Churchill Drive, Crofton Downs, Wellington, New Zealand
- Coordinates: 41°15′18.26″S 174°45′58.96″E
- System: Metlink commuter rail
- Owner: Greater Wellington Regional Council
- Line: Johnsonville Line
- Platforms: Single side
- Tracks: Main line (1)
- Connections: None

Construction
- Parking: 44 spaces

Other information
- Fare zone: 3

History
- Opened: 25 March 1963
- Electrified: 2 July 1938

Services
Preceding station	Transdev Wellington	Following station
Ngaio towards Johnsonville	Johnsonville Line	Wellington Terminus
Track layout
Location

Crofton Downs railway station is one of eight stations on the Johnsonville Branch, a commuter branch railway north of Wellington in New Zealand's North Island. It serves the suburb of Crofton Downs. Its name is similar to the pre-1908 name for the different Ngaio station, Crofton.

Electric multiple unit trains are operated by Transdev under the Metlink brand through this station in both directions to Johnsonville (to the north) and Wellington (to the south). The station is one of four stations on the line located on a curve.

== History ==
Crofton Downs is the most recent station on the Johnsonville Branch, having been opened in 1963 to serve the then new suburb of Crofton Downs. Patronage of the station was light in its early years, not becoming popular until housing in the area was well developed.

== Services ==
Trains run in both directions through this station, departing at half-hourly intervals, supplemented by a 13/13/26 schedule at peak times on weekdays.

The 22 bus route connects the station to Johnsonville and Wellington.

== Facilities ==
This station has a single side platform, passenger shelter, and commuter car park. Behind the station is a Mitre 10 hardware store and customer car park.

In 2019/20 the GWRC planned to "renew" the Crofton Downs railway station.

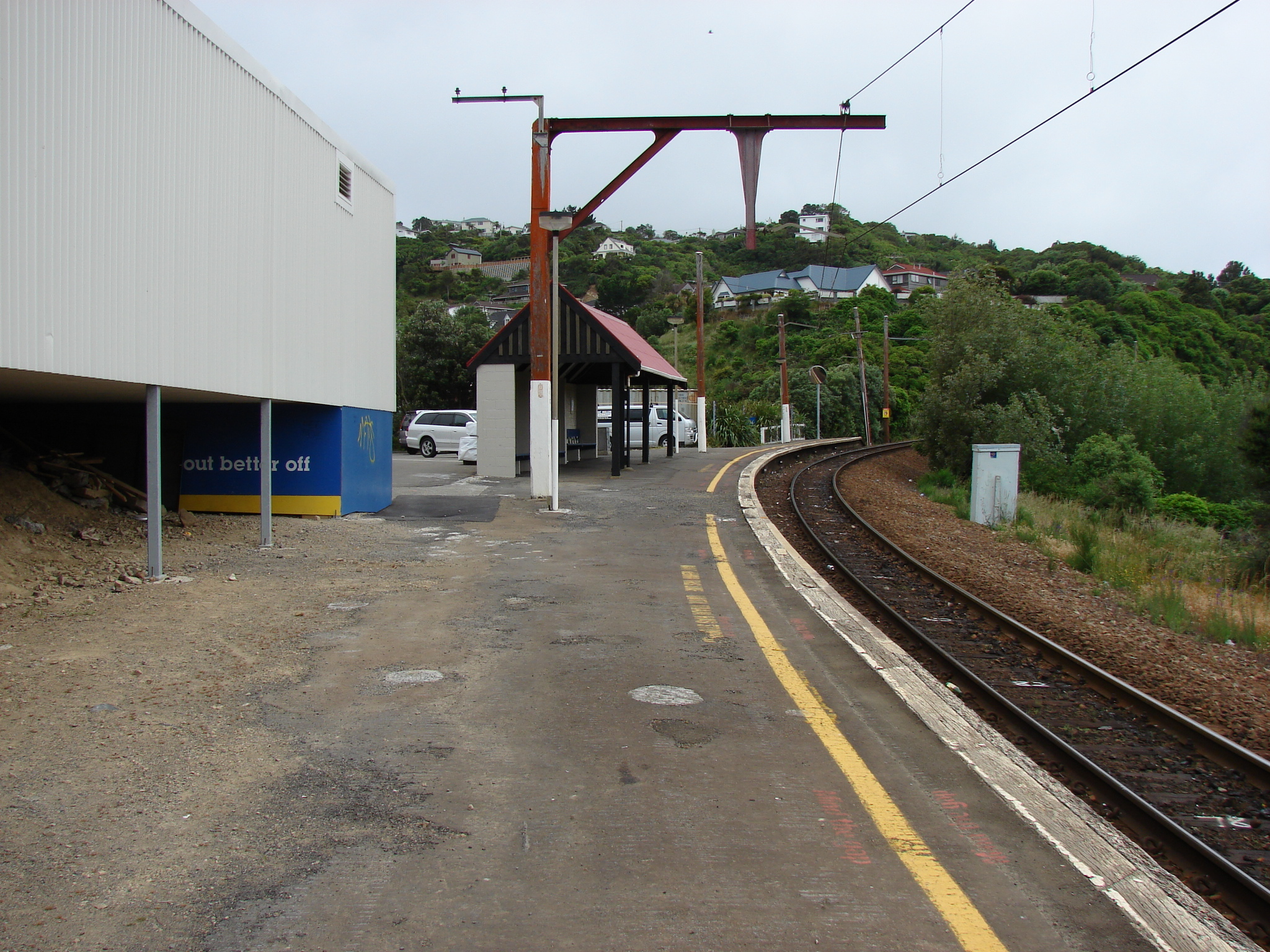
From the station platform, looking in the direction of the station car park and north to Johnsonville

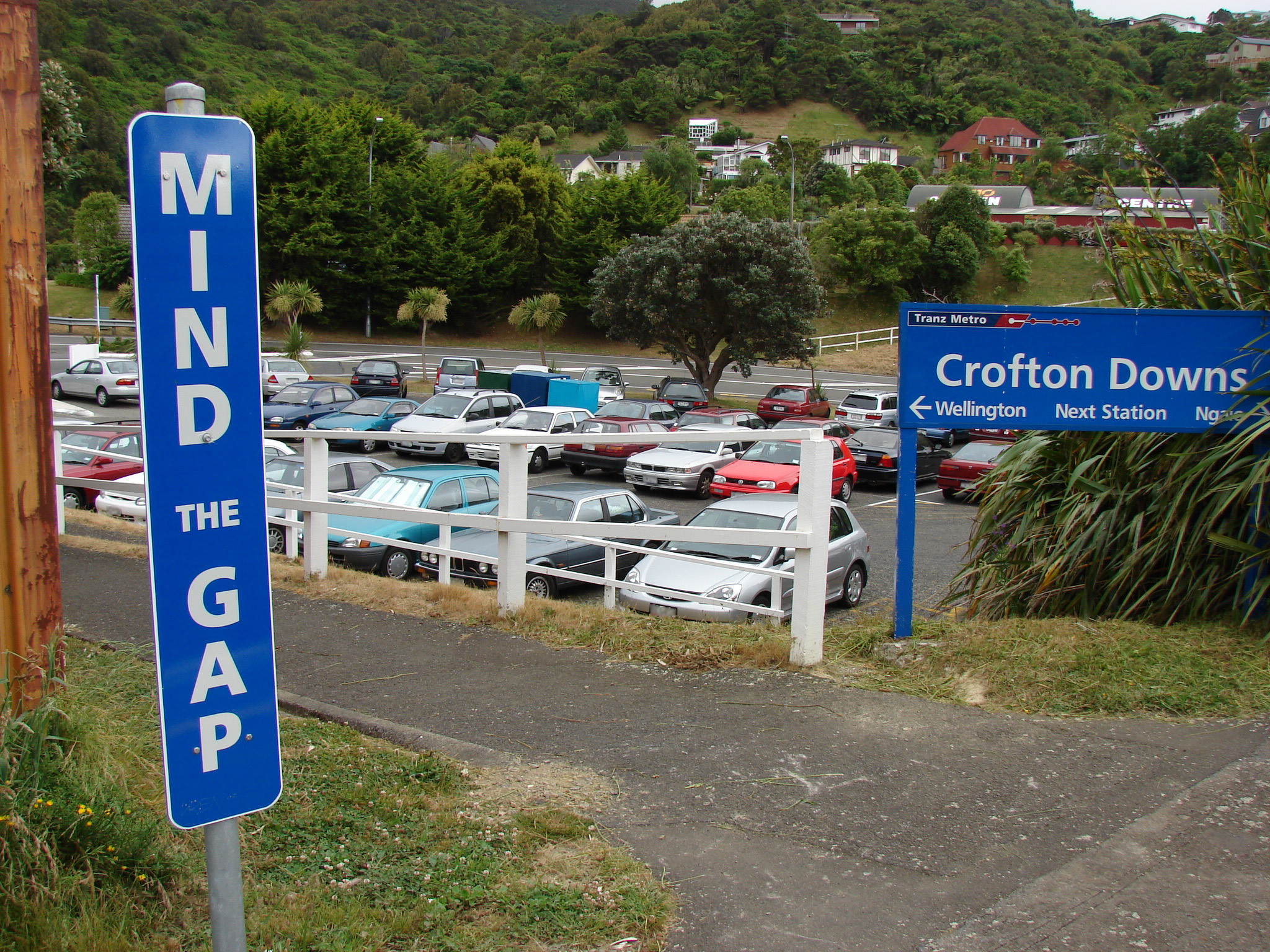
Commuter car park
