= Khandallah railway station =

Railway station in New Zealand

Khandallah
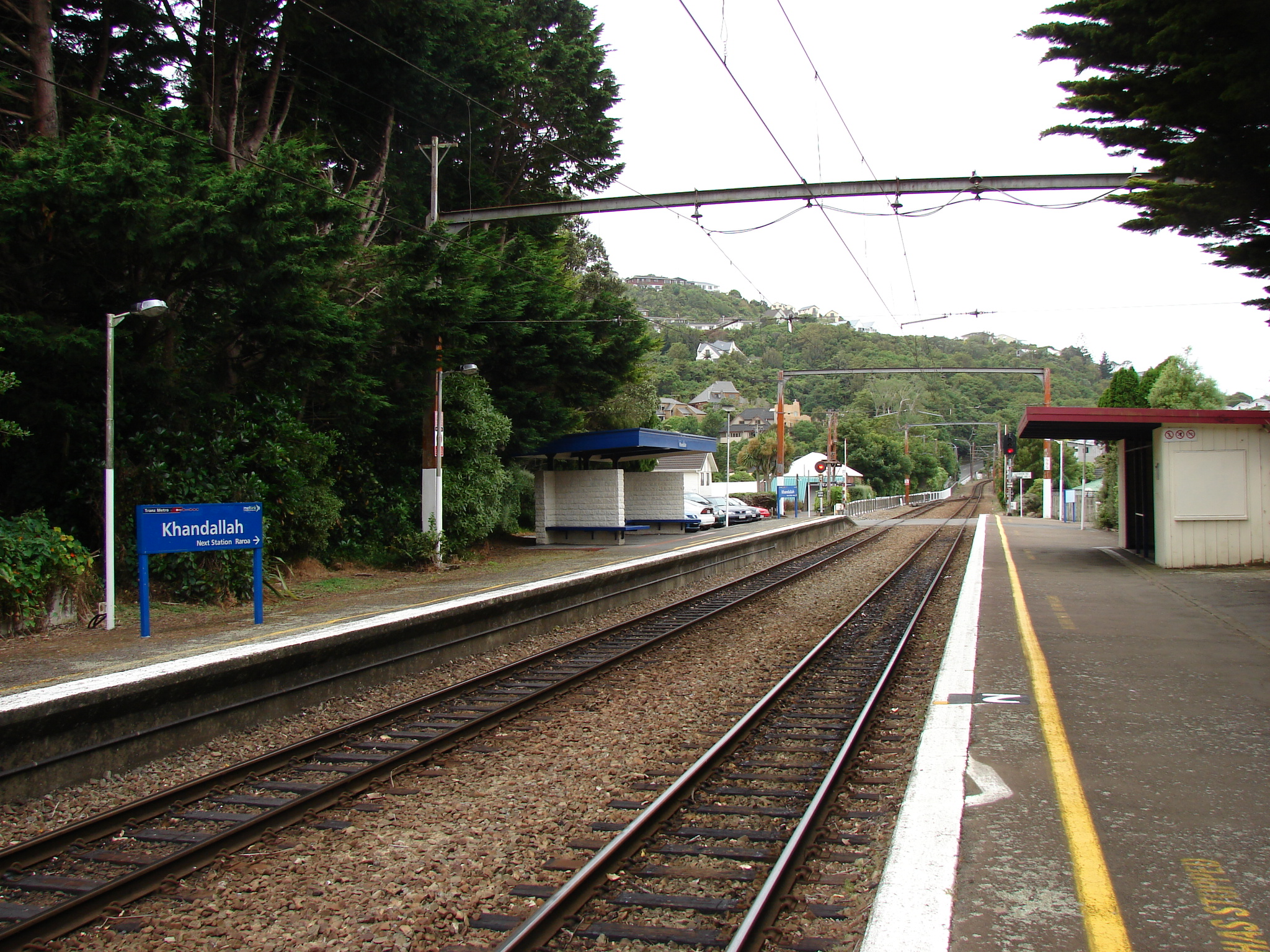

General information
- Location: Station Road, Khandallah, Wellington, New Zealand
- Coordinates: 41°14′34.05″S 174°47′35.94″E
- System: Metlink commuter rail
- Owner: Greater Wellington Regional Council
- Line: Johnsonville Line
- Platforms: Dual side
- Tracks: Main line (1); Crossing loop (1)
- Connections: Bus services

Construction
- Parking: 8 spaces
- Cycle facilities: No

Other information
- Fare zone: 3

History
- Opened: 21 September 1885
- Rebuilt: 1967, c2010
- Electrified: 2 July 1938

Services
Preceding station	Transdev Wellington	Following station
Raroa towards Johnsonville	Johnsonville Line	Box Hill towards Wellington
Location

Khandallah railway station is one of eight stations on the Johnsonville Line, a commuter branch railway north of Wellington in New Zealand's North Island. The station was erected and operated by the Wellington and Manawatu Railway Company (WMR) on their line from Wellington to Longburn. From the acquisition of the WMR by the New Zealand Railways Department in 1908 until the opening of the Tawa Flat deviation in 1937, the station was on the North Island Main Trunk Railway.

Electric multiple unit trains are operated under the Metlink brand through this station in both directions to Johnsonville (to the north) and Wellington (to the south).

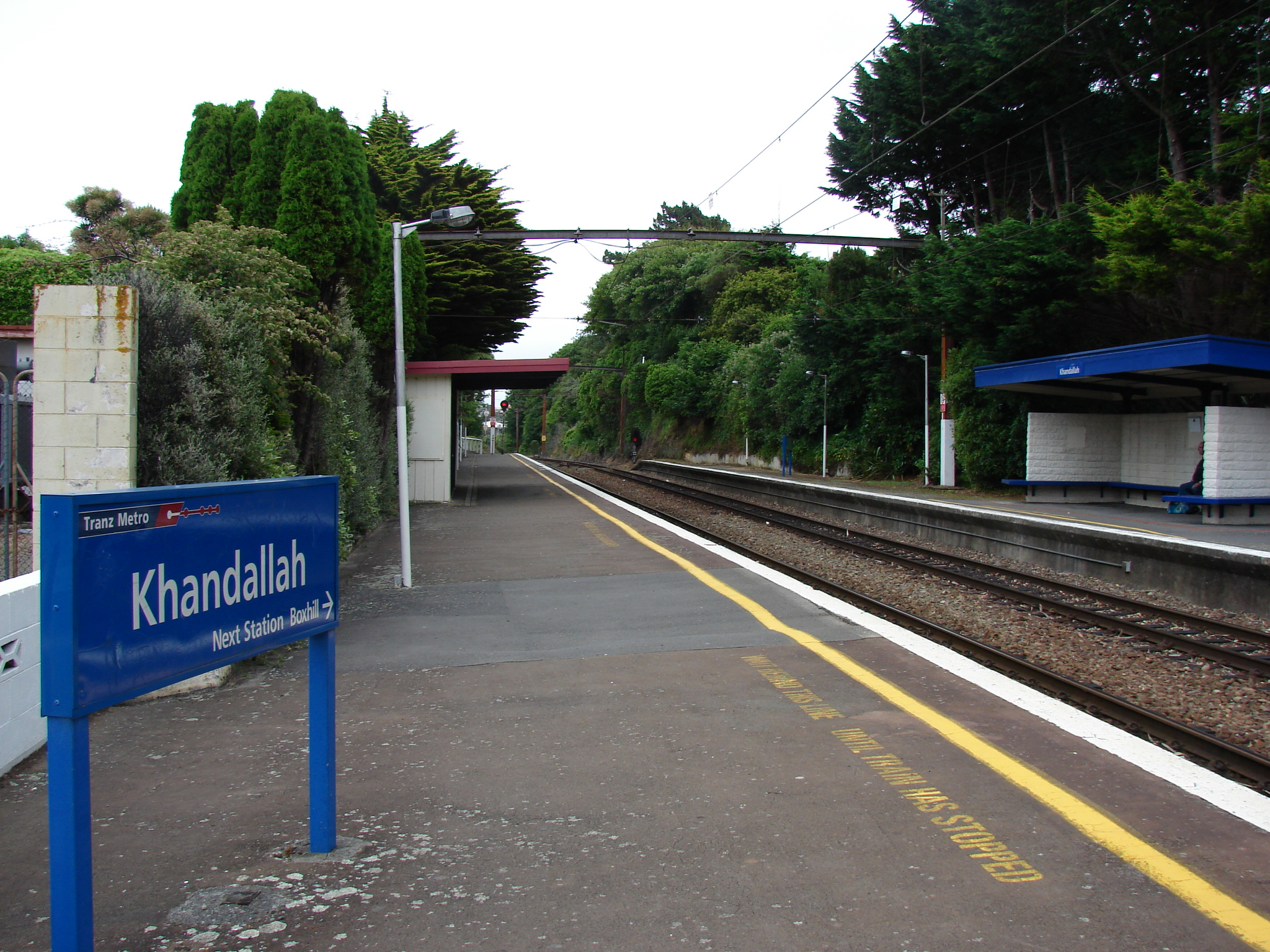
From the station platform, looking south

== History ==
Khandallah was one of three stations constructed by the Wellington and Manawatu Railway Company on what is now known as the Johnsonville Branch. It was opened on 21 September 1885 along with the first section of the company's line between Wellington and Paremata. Timetabled services began several days later on the 24th.

As originally constructed by the WMR, the "flag" station had a single side platform, a small wooden passenger shelter, and a crossing loop. Later, after the government assumed control of the line, the station had a signal box built at the north end of the platform, a second loop and a back shunt. By 1947, there was only one loop and the second platform had been installed with its own passenger shelter. The back shunt and signal box were removed more recently, possibly when the WMR station building was replaced in 1967.

In 1938 a Khandallah Town Hall meeting celebrated the commencement of the new suburban train service.

In January 2019 a SUV was accidentally driven onto the station tracks.

On 6 June 2026, a Matangi train set was misrouted onto a dead-end siding to the south of the station and crashed into a concrete buffer. The trains frame was severely damaged with a few passengers being injured and the driver being seriously injured. The train driver is reported to have passed a signal displaying a red aspect.

== Operation ==
Up trains use the loop at this station, with Down trains remaining on the main line. Safety sidings are located at the northern and southern ends of the loop for Up and Down trains (respectively). Colour light signals are also located at both ends of the platforms.

== Services ==
Trains run in both directions through this station, departing at half-hourly intervals, supplemented by a 13/13/26 schedule at peak times on week days.

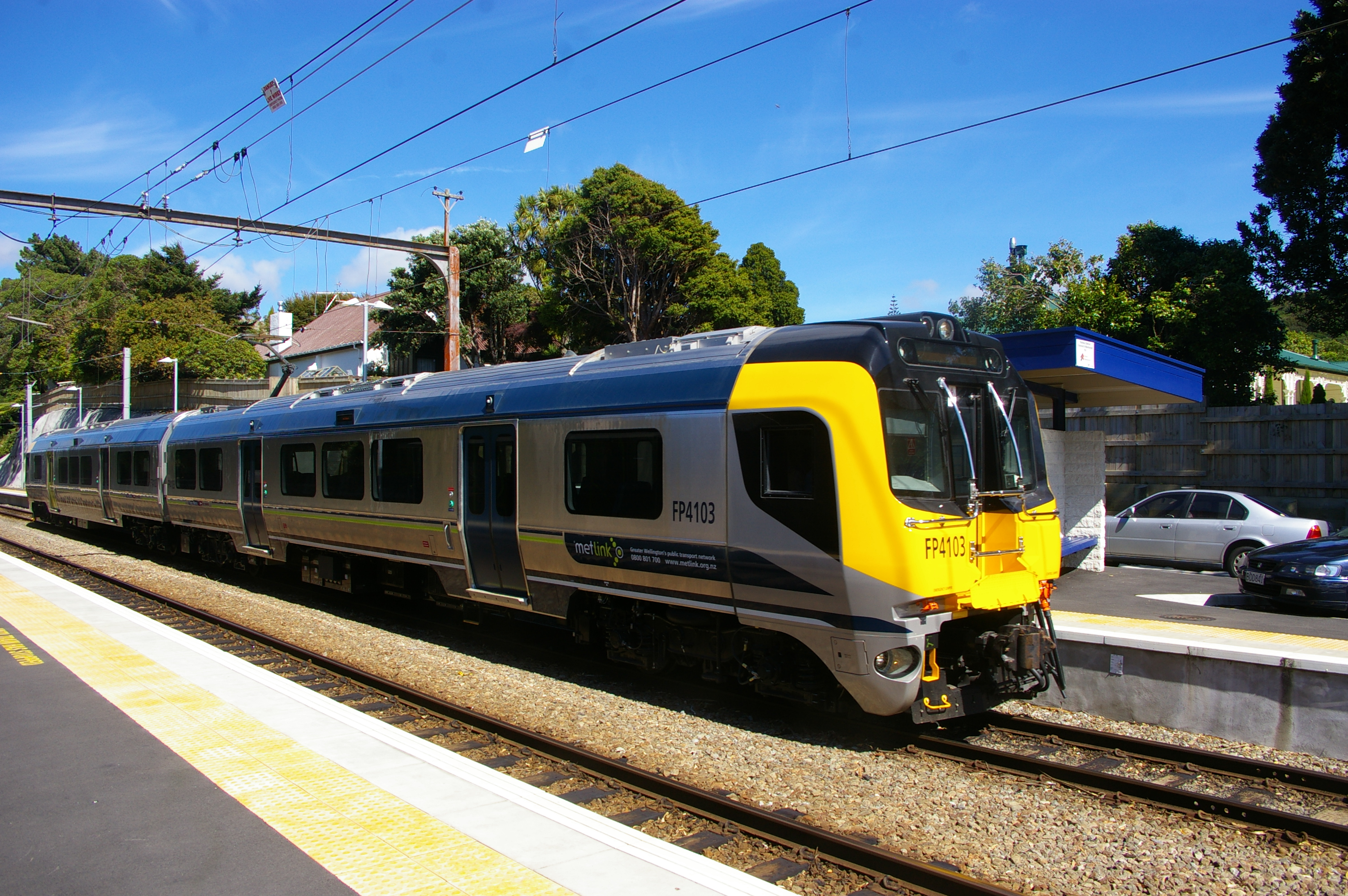
EMU 4103 at Khandallah Station in March 2011

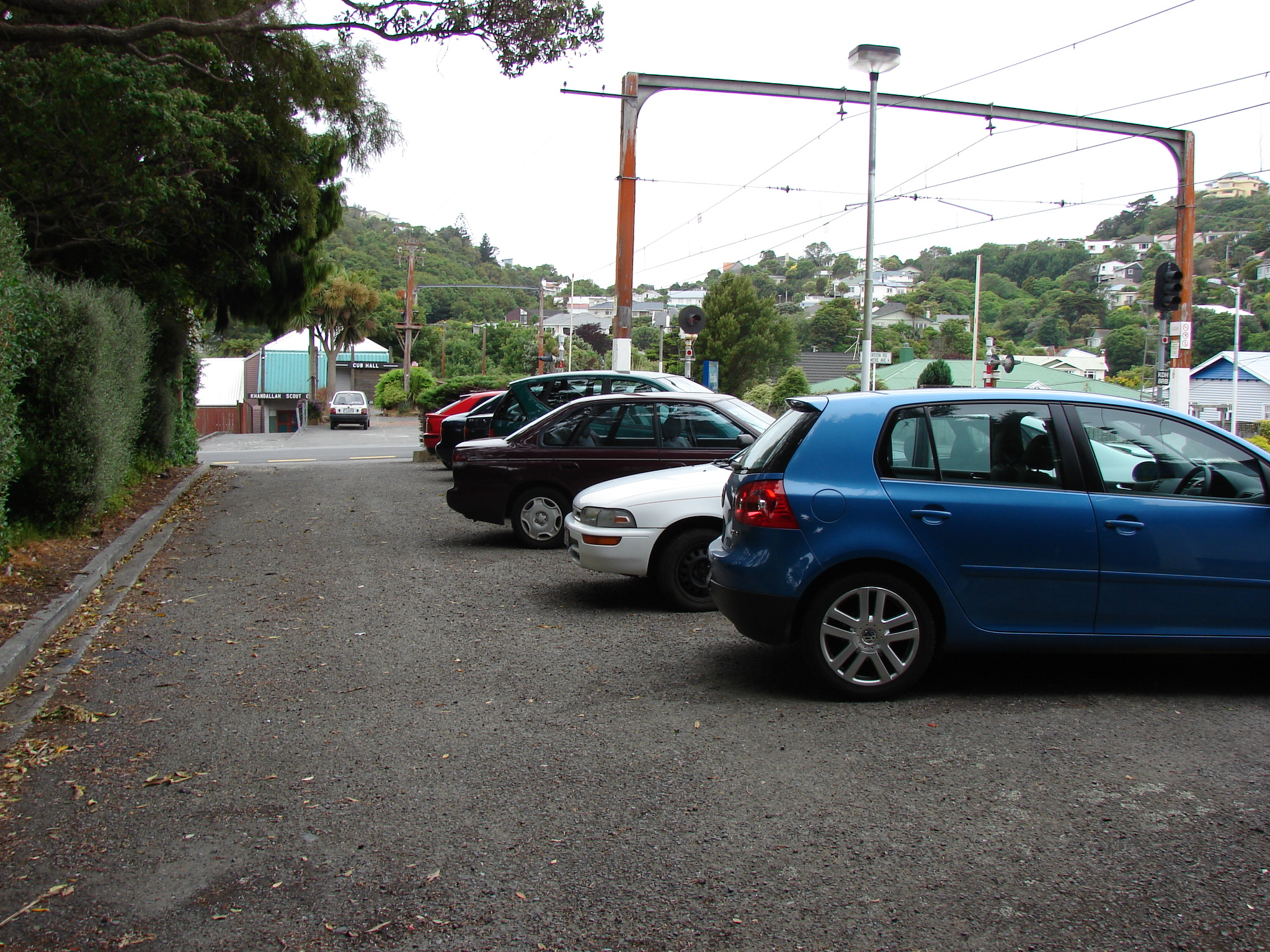
Station car park

== Facilities ==
This station has dual side platforms with a passenger shelter on each. There is a small station car park (9 parks) off Station Road, behind the Up train platform. The original station and signalbox buildings were on the Down platform.

Pedestrian access to the station is from the north ends of the Up and Down platforms to Station Road, which is also gives access between the platforms via a level crossing with automatic half-arm barriers. There is also pedestrian access from the south end of the Down platform via a zig-zag path to the junction of Cashmere Avenue and Agra Crescent. There is a pedestrian path from the north side of the crossing to the bottom of the Burma Road hill and a pedestrian rail crossing with bells between Burma Road and Poona Street.
