= Raroa railway station =

New Zealand railway station

Raroa
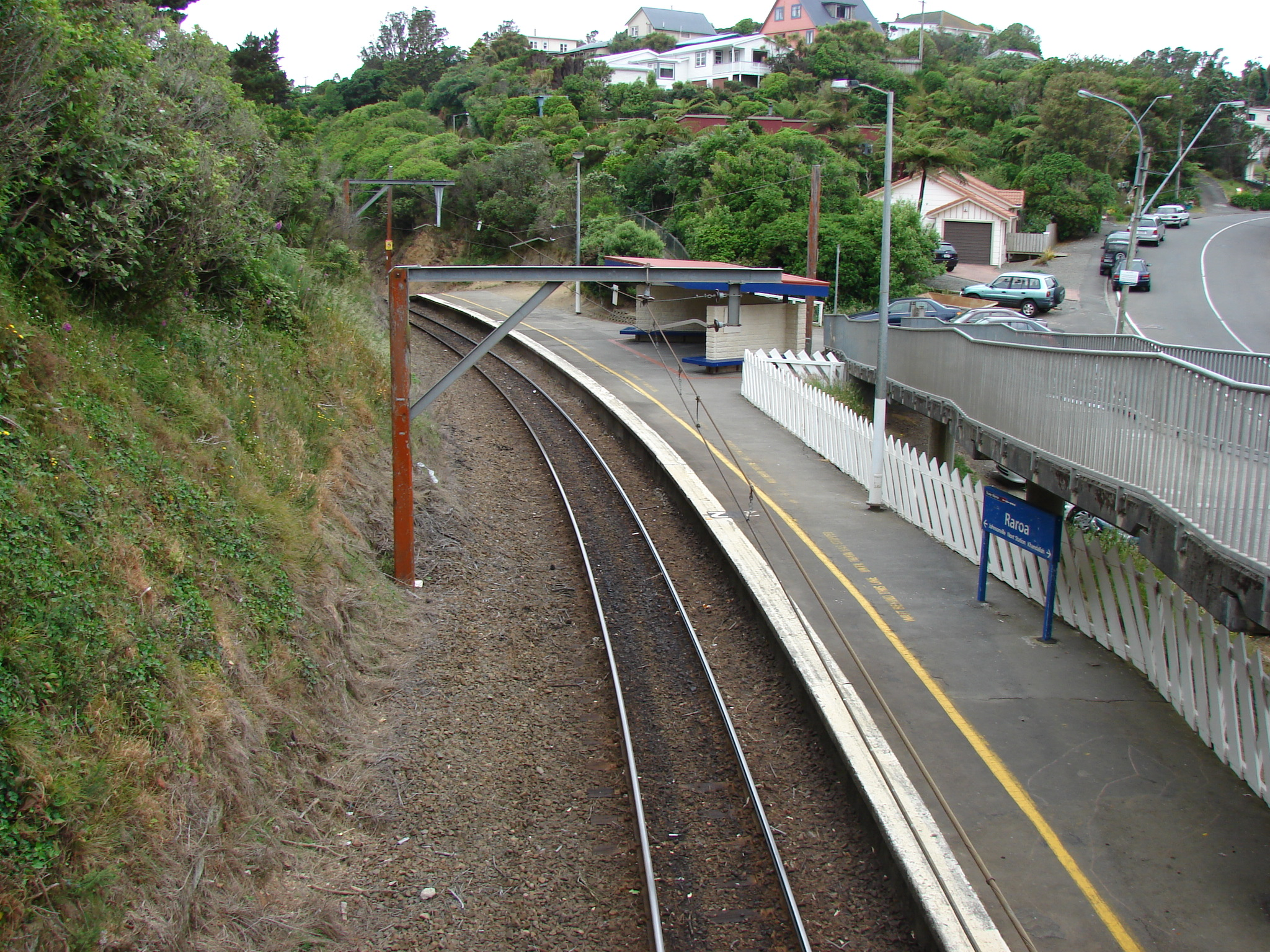

General information
- Location: Fraser Avenue, Johnsonville, Wellington, New Zealand
- Coordinates: 41°13′56.34″S 174°48′6.27″E
- System: Metlink commuter rail
- Owner: Greater Wellington Regional Council
- Line: Johnsonville Branch
- Platforms: Single side
- Tracks: Main line (1)

Construction
- Parking: Yes
- Cycle facilities: Yes

Other information
- Fare zone: 3

History
- Opened: 17 June 1940
- Electrified: 2 July 1938

Services
Preceding station	Transdev Wellington	Following station
Johnsonville Terminus	Johnsonville Line	Khandallah towards Wellington
Location

Raroa railway station, one of eight stations on the Johnsonville Branch (a commuter branch-railway north of Wellington in New Zealand's North Island), serves the suburbs of Raroa and Broadmeadows. It is one of four stations on the line located on a curve.

Electric multiple-unit (EMU) trains operate under the Metlink brand through this station in both directions to Johnsonville (to the north) and to Wellington (to the south).

== History ==
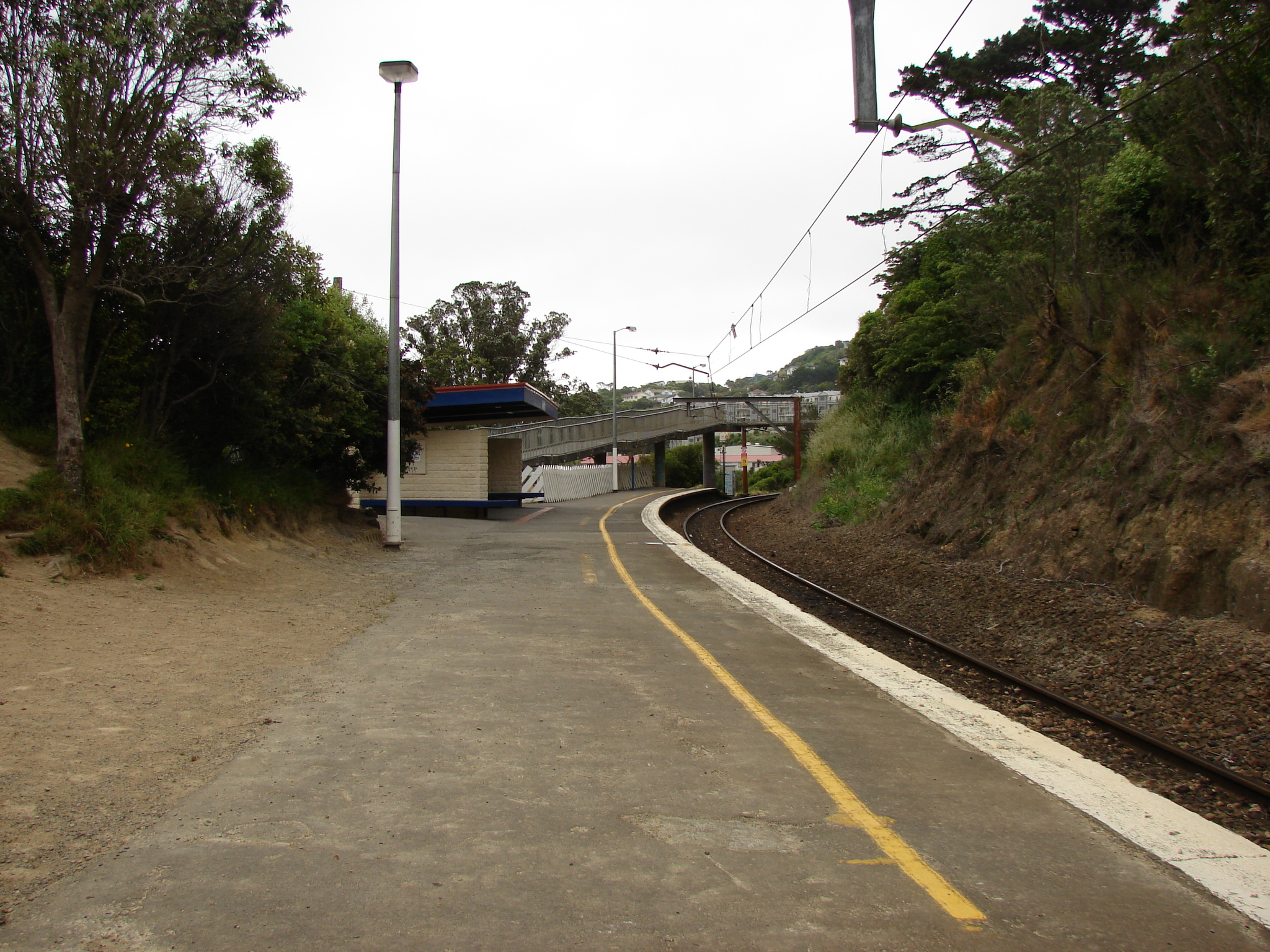
From the station platform, looking south.

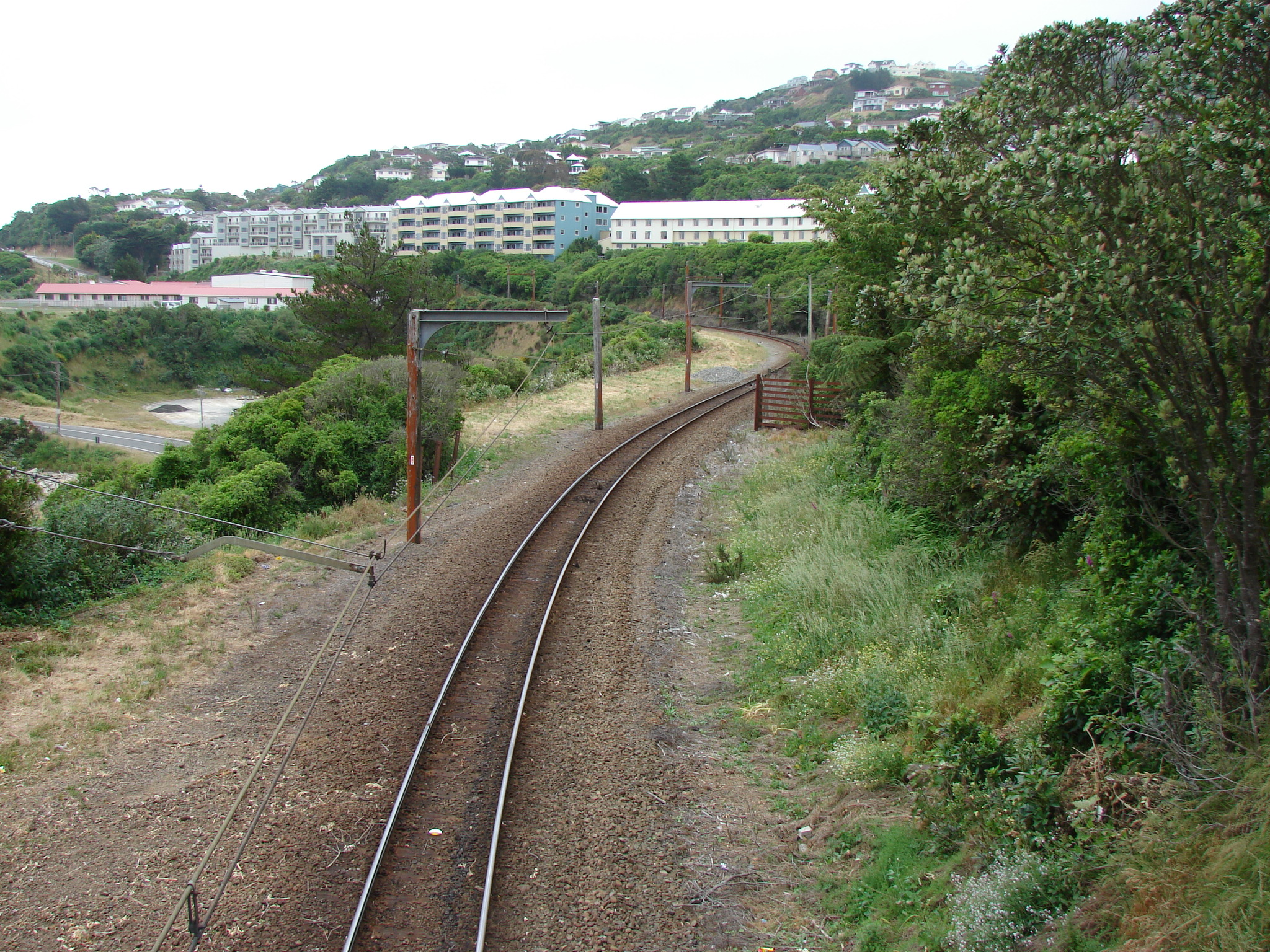
Looking out over the area to the south of Raroa railway station where the stockyards and sidings used to be; with Malvina Major Retirement Village (on Burma Road), and Broadmeadows on the skyline.

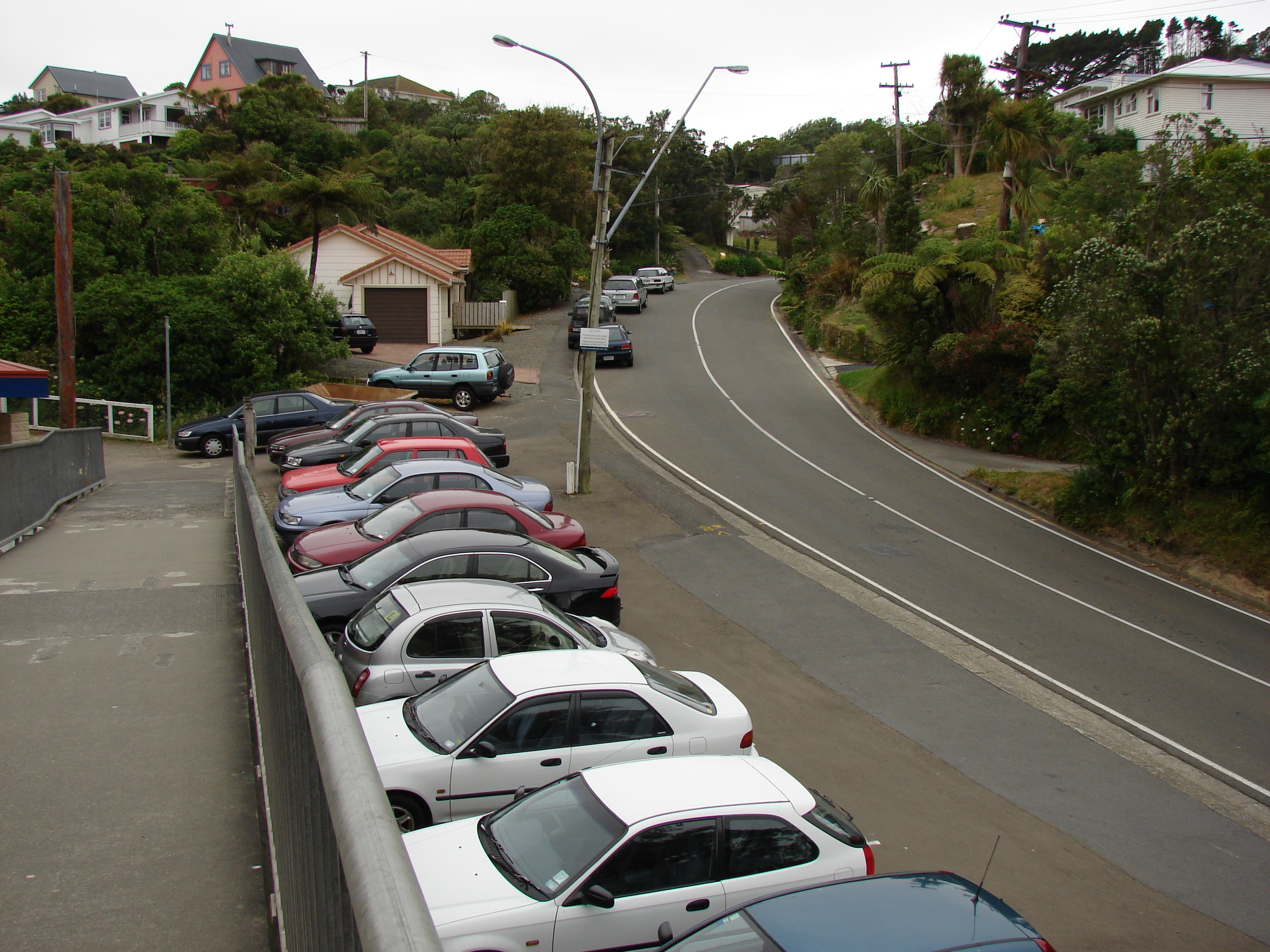
Station car parking off Fraser Avenue.

Raroa came into existence subsequent to electrification to serve the needs of the expanding population north of Wellington and was opened on 17 June 1940. Construction was authorised in February 1940, and when it was opened, so few houses could be seen from the station that a guard with a sense of humour used to call out Snake Gully, five minutes for refreshments (referring to the then-popular Australian radio serial "Dad and Dave from Snake Gully"), until someone complained.

Raroa Station is notable as the terminus for the last freight traffic on the Johnsonville Branch. Because of transport licensing regulations under a 1931 Act of parliament that required rail to be used in preference to road to cart goods over certain distances if there was a rail option, livestock trains were run on the Johnsonville Branch to transport livestock to the railhead closest to the (then Council; now Taylor Preston) abattoir in Ngauranga Gorge. The terminus of this service used to be the stockyards at Johnsonville station; cattle were driven through the streets of Johnsonville and down Fraser Avenue to it. Public pressure in the 1950s resulted in the stockyards being relocated to Raroa, and livestock unloaded there from 2 February 1958. From the stockyards, the livestock were transported by truck to the abattoir. Though the provision relating to the transport of livestock was repealed in 1962, the trains continued to run until about 1973. The siding was not closed until 4 October 1976, and the track was lifted about 1982.

== Services ==
Trains run in both directions through this station, departing at half-hourly intervals, supplemented by a 13/13/26 schedule at peak times on week days.

There are no bus connections with this station.

The train station is close to Raroa Intermediate and Onslow College; which can be reached by an overbridge and footpath to Burma Road.

== Facilities ==
This station has a single side platform and passenger shelter. Access to the station is from Fraser Avenue, with pedestrian access from Haumia Street via a walkway, and from Burma Road (Onslow College and Raroa Intermediate School), Raroa Park and Tuapapa Street via a footbridge.

There are ten park and ride commuter car parks on Fraser Avenue, and with the loss of car parks at Johnsonville railway station during replacement of the Broderick Road overbridge in 2014–15, a further 35 car parks were provided across Fraser Avenue.
