= Johnsonville Branch =

Railway line in New Zealand

Coordinates: 41°13′24.01″S 174°48′17″E

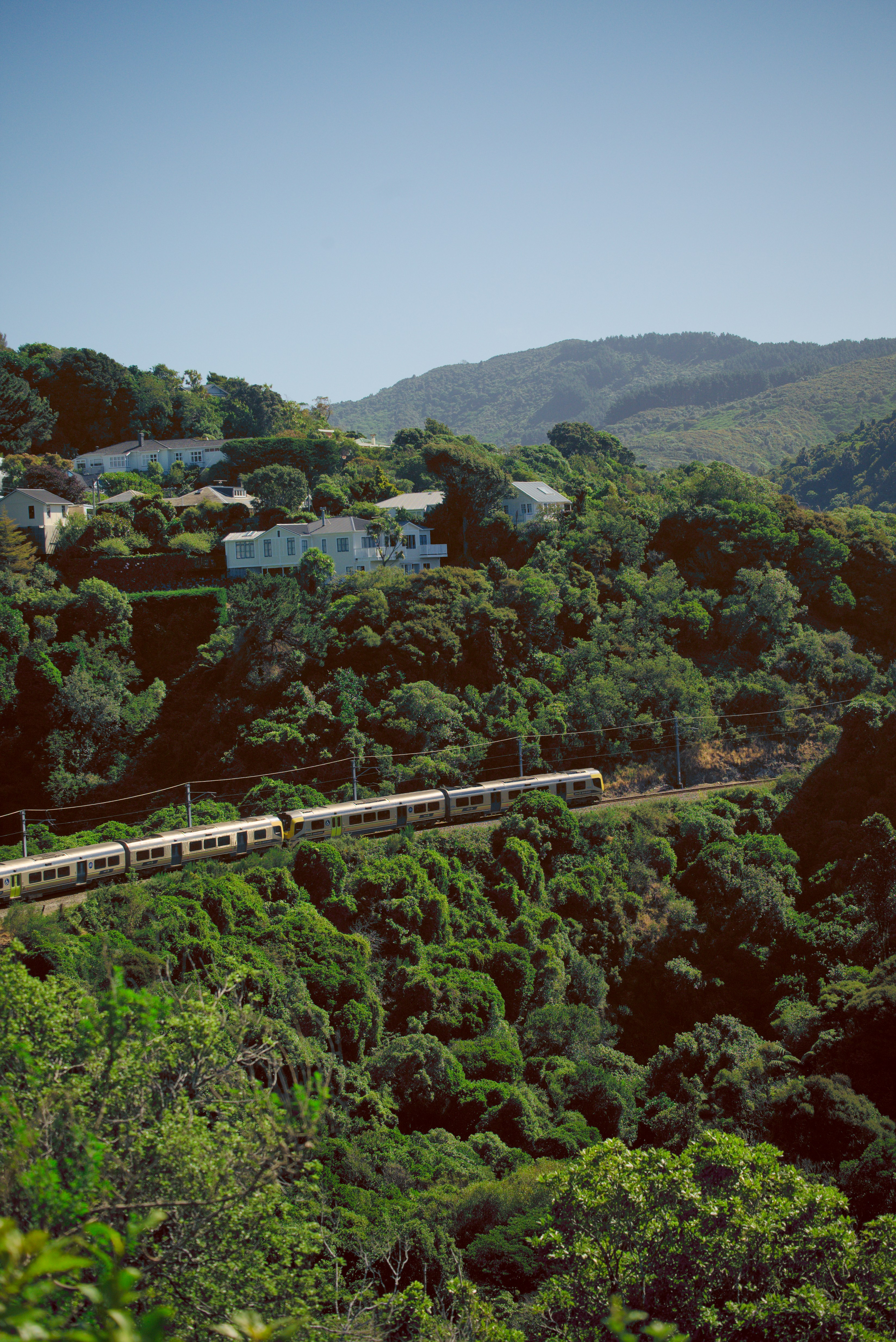
- Matangi (FP class) EMU leaving Crofton Downs station on 5 February 2024

Overview
- Status: Open, passenger only
- Owner: KiwiRail (track); Greater Wellington Regional Council (stations)
- Locale: Wellington, New Zealand
- Termini: Wellington; Johnsonville
- Stations: 8

Service
- Type: Commuter rail
- System: Metlink
- Route number: JVL
- Operator: Transdev Wellington
- Rolling stock: Matangi class electric multiple units
- Ridership: 1,119,000 per annum (2011–2012)

History
- Opened: 24 September 1885 (as Wellington & Manawatu Railway)

Technical
- Line length: 10.49 km (6.52 mi)
- Num of tracks: 1 with 3 crossing loops
- Character: Suburban
- Track gauge: 1,067 mm (3 ft 6 in)
- Electrification: 1,500 V DC overhead catenary
- Operating speed: 60 km/h (37 mph) maximum
- Highest elevation: 152 m (499 ft) (Raroa)

Map

The Johnsonville Branch, also known as the Johnsonville Line, is a commuter branch line railway from the main Railway Station of Wellington, New Zealand to the northern suburb of Johnsonville via Ngaio and Khandallah.

Transdev Wellington operates the trains under contract from the Greater Wellington Regional Council. In 2001, an estimated 1,043 passengers used the line on a working day.

The line has seven tunnels and eight stations. Four stations (Crofton Downs, Awarua Street, Box Hill, and Raroa) are on a curve. There are three crossing loops: at Ngaio and Khandallah stations and below Wadestown in Ngaio Gorge.

== History ==
The line was built in the 1880s as part of the Wellington-Manawatu railway line constructed by the private Wellington and Manawatu Railway Company (W&MR), to connect Wellington to Longburn near Palmerston North, where it connected to the New Zealand Railways network. Construction started in 1879, and the first section, to Paremata, opened on 24 September 1885. The line became part of the North Island Main Trunk when the government bought the W&MR in December 1908.

The line was used by railway workers from the Tarikaka Settlement in Ngaio, including early shift workers who needed to fire up steam locomotives at the Wellington depot.

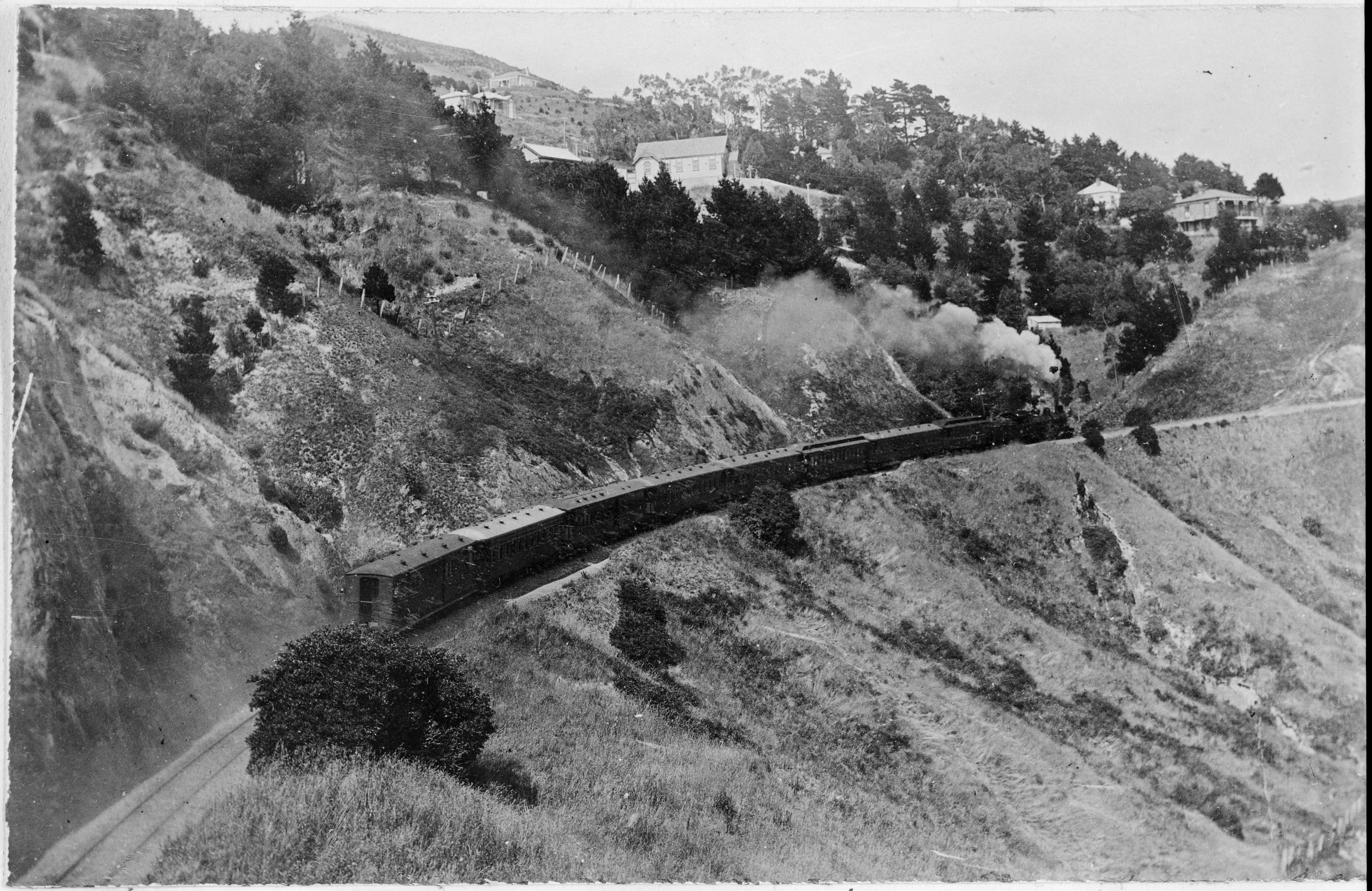
Napier Express climbing to Ngaio on 1 January 1911, photo by Albert Percy Godber

Two experimental RM class railcars were briefly used on the line as NZR sought to develop economically viable railcar technology. The Westinghouse railcar was introduced in 1914 and served through to 1917. The Thomas Transmission railcar was introduced in 1916 and operated sporadically into the early 1920s. Both railcars struggled on the steep grades and revealed that further advances were needed to make railcars suitable to New Zealand's conditions. Trains going north often used banking engines on the steep grade from Lambton to Ngaio and sometimes when going south from Johnsonville to Raroa.

The line became a branch when the Tawa Flat deviation of the NIMT opened to passengers in 1937, and was sometimes called The Hill (in NZR jargon). The line was electrified at 1500 V DC overhead supply, and the new service with the new English Electric DM/D class electric multiple units service started from Monday 4 July 1938, after an opening ceremony on 2 July. The units normally operated as two-car motor/trailer sets, or four-car sets in peak hours. Additional DM/D class units were ordered for the line in 1942 and supplied in 1946.

The line was terminated in Johnsonville, about 100 m beyond the end of the current line: the State Highway 1 motorway on-ramp follows the route of the old line. Ngaio and Khandallah stations already had crossing loops, and new stations at Awarua Street and Simla Crescent plus a third crossing loop (without passenger platforms) at Wadestown between No. 3 and No. 4 tunnels were added. The two new stations had been used by steam trains from 10 January 1938, although only some local trains stopped there (on request). Even with two additional stops the time to Johnsonville was now 19 minutes either way; previously with steam operation trains took 25 minutes up and 21 minutes down.

Stations were added at Raroa (17 June 1940), Box Hill (16 July 1956) and Crofton Downs (25 March 1963).

The line was reviewed in 1984, 1993 and 2006–07 to consider either closing or upgrading it, without any significant changes being made.

== Services ==
A half-hourly service runs daily, augmented to a quarter-hourly service at peak periods.

The line was the first Wellington line to adopt the Snapper card for fare payments, from 14 November 2021. Commuters "tag" on and off at card readers located on the station platform; the hardware and reader stands etc. were installed from August. The system was originally a "trial" for eventually replacing paper tickets on other Wellington suburban lines.

The line has been passenger-only since the termination of livestock trains for an abattoir in the Ngauranga Gorge. The livestock were originally driven on foot through Johnsonville streets from a stockyard adjacent to the station, but after protests sidings near Raroa were opened on 2 February 1958. The livestock traffic ceased about 1973, though the sidings at Raroa were not lifted until about 1982. Because of the sharp curves on the line, EW class electric locomotives were used for livestock trains instead of the earlier ED class locomotives, which were hard on the track with their long rigid wheelbase. The first through revenue-earning train on the line ran on 30 October 1886 from Longburn to Johnsonville, carrying 355 sheep and 60 head of cattle for the Wellington Meat Preserving Company at Ngauranga.

== Infrastructure ==
The line is single track through very steep terrain rising 150 m above sea level in its 10 km length, with the highest point (152 m) at the north end of Kaka Tunnel. The ruling grade is 1 in 36, with long sections from Wellington to Crofton Downs and Khandallah of 1 in 40. There are seven narrow tunnels, six bridges, and three passing loops. There are three level crossings with half-barriers; at the Simla Crescent and Khandallah stations, and at Fraser Avenue between Khandallah and Raroa stations (the Fraser Avenue crossing was last to get barriers as well as bells, in 2009). There is a private rail crossing to a house immediately south of the Fraser Avenue crossing; and a pedestrian crossing from Burma Road to Poona Street, Khandallah between the Khandallah station and the Rangoon Street road overbridge. Pedestrians can also cross the line at the Ngaio station.

The signals were operated by the trains, a standard SLA Absolute Block System; the first train at a crossing station or siding (Wadestown, Ngaio and Khandallah) claimed the next block (if two arrived simultaneously, the up train got priority as there was a five-second delay for the down train). The system was revised in July 1969; the second platform siding at Johnsonville was removed and the goods yard (since removed) became a switch-locked siding. Signal boxes were initially retained at Ngaio and Khandallah. Up to 1984 when the line was truncated and the station was moved to accommodate the mall, the station had two sidings on either side of the station platform and the preferred platform was alternated every 12 hours to equalise usage.

The Wellington City Council let a $1.7m tender to replace the Rangoon Street single-lane overbridge of c1906, which crosses the Johnsonville line, with a two-lane bridge. Work commenced in June 2008 and was completed by December 2008.

Three traction substations along the line take electricity from Wellington Electricity's 11,000-volt distribution network before transforming and rectifying it to 1500-volt direct current for the overhead traction lines. The substations are located at Wellington (shared with the Kapiti and Hutt Valley Lines), Ngaio and Khandallah.

The names of the tunnels and their length in feet and metres are:

No.	Name	Length (ft)	Length (m)	Remarks
No.1	Outlet	413	126	above Hutt Road
No.2	Kaiwarra	321	98	in Ngaio Gorge
No.3	Gorge	494	151	in Ngaio Gorge
No.4	Lizard	655	200	in Ngaio Gorge
No.5	Ngaio	416	127	in Ngaio Gorge
No.6	Kaka	341	125	between Khandallah and Raroa
No.7	Tui	391	119	between Raroa and Johnsonville

=== Upgrade in 2008–2009 ===
The North Wellington Public Transport Study by GWRC and WCC considered four options for improved public transport: enhanced rail; bus on street; conversion to a guided busway; and conversion to light rail. On 16 November 2006 the GWRC Public Transport Committee and the WCC Strategy & Policy Committee accepted a "Do Minimum" option involving retention of the line and replacement of the current DM units with the same number of refurbished EM/ET class (Ganz Mavag) units; this required enlarging the tunnels and increasing platform clearances and lengths. GWRC now only use Matangi units on this line after the decision to withdraw all Ganz Mavag units in the region from service in favour of a larger order of Matangi units.

GWRC envisaged (2007) that the track through the tunnels would need to be lowered by 120 mm, depending on the new units. Lengthening of passing loops and platforms was also likely to be needed, and the estimated cost was $5 million. A programme of preparatory work for the tunnel upgrading commenced on 7 September 2008 and was completed in February 2009. Construction took place after 20:00 on Sunday – Thursday nights to minimise disruption to commuters, with services being replaced by buses. The seven tunnels were upgraded in January 2009 during a period in which the line was closed to all traffic. The work included:

- lowering the track and widening the side clearances in the seven tunnels
- lengthening the three crossing loops, allowing longer trains
- upgrading platforms by lengthening them and increasing clearances
- increasing clearances under two bridges: Lower a rail bridge in Ngaio Gorge (between tunnels) and lower the level of the track under the Raroa Station footbridge
- new power substation at Ngaio

=== Upgrade in 2019–2022 ===
Upgrading of the overhead power catenary system with replacement of the remaining one hundred wooden poles by steel poles was completed in 2022. A steel section of the pedestrian overbridge at Raroa railway station was also replaced in Easter 2022 (16-18 April).

== Rolling stock ==
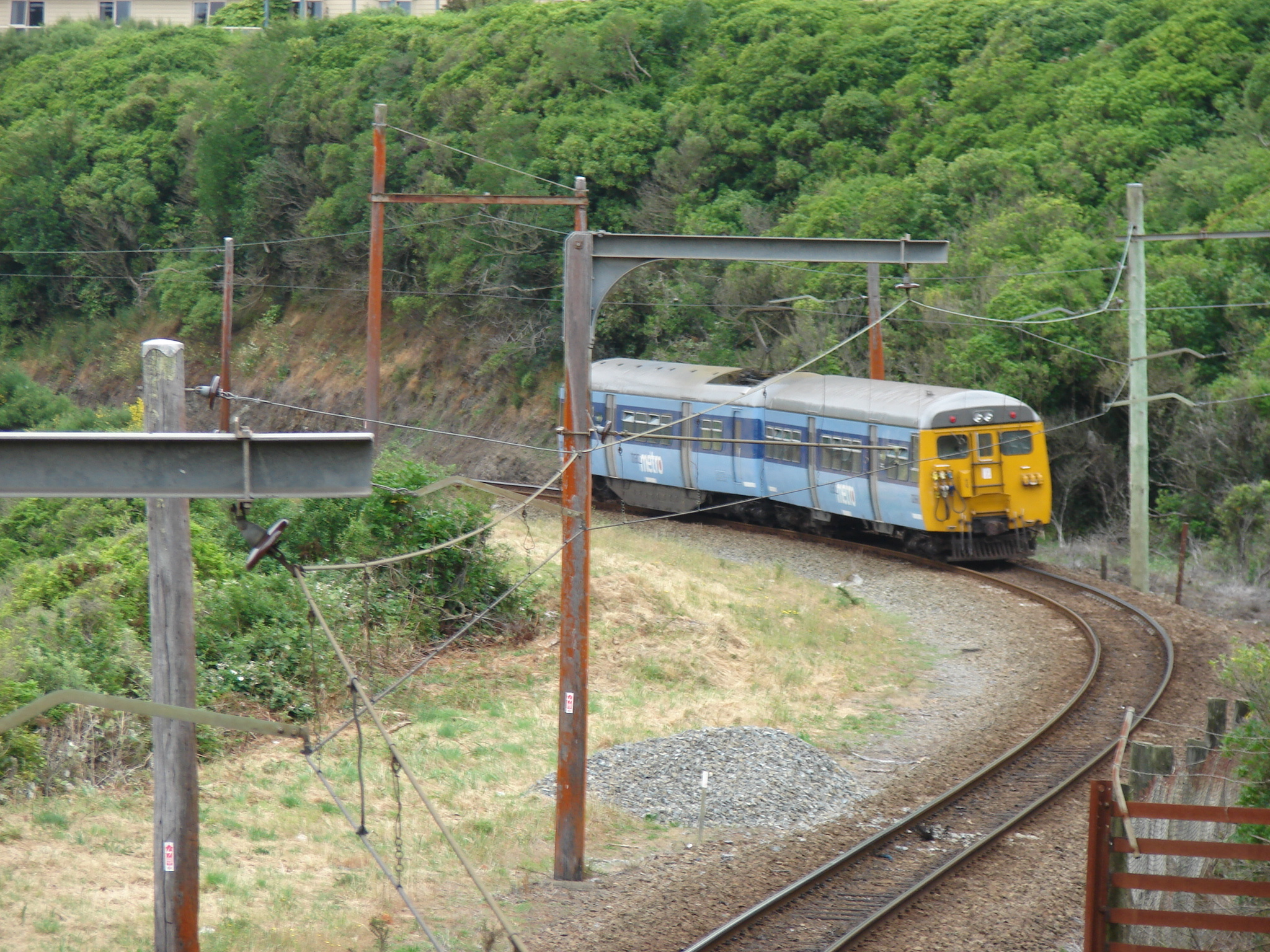
A southbound DM class EMU just south of Raroa on the Johnsonville Line in 2007. The last of the English Electric DM class EMUs was withdrawn from the line in February 2012.

From 1937, the dominant rolling stock on the line was the English Electric DM class electric multiple units (EMUs). The original units from the 1930s and 1940s were withdrawn in the early 1980s, but their replacements, the Ganz-Mavag electric multiple units were not operated on the Johnsonville line. Contrary to reports by The Evening Post, this was not due to clearance issues, but rather loading gauge restrictions and insufficient braking capability on the larger, heavier Ganz-Mavag units. In 1992, a test train was run by New Zealand Rail to demonstrate that Ganz-Mavag units could run on the line, and successfully demonstrated that with some track modifications for normal in-service operations, the units could clear all tunnels on the line and station platforms. Despite the tests, English Electric units continued to be used until the 2010s with the introduction of Matangi EMUs.

Due to significant mechanical difficulties being experienced by Tranz Metro in keeping the English Electric DM class EMUs in service, several units were withdrawn from service in February 2012. Buses were added to supplement the remaining service capacity pending the planned introduction of the FT/FP "Matangi" EMUs on 19 March 2012. The first Matangi service was the 11:02 departure from Wellington, which passed the last English Electric service on the line at Ngaio station.

The new Matangi EMUs struggled on the Johnsonville Line with rail track squeal and to maintain the schedule used for the English Electrics, especially in wet conditions. To improve schedule reliability, the Johnsonville Line timetable was initially changed to a longer morning peak journey time of 22 minutes to Wellington and 26 minutes to Johnsonville and it is now 23 minutes and 28 minutes.

== Incidents ==
On 20 May 1941, two units (EMUs) collided on the branch on the section between Wadestown and Ngaio.

On 1 February 2011, a Johnsonville-bound suburban multiple electric unit derailed at the passing loop switch when leaving Ngaio station and ran off through a barrier fence, stopping about a metre into the station carpark. Although no one was injured, about 16 passengers were kept on board the train for around 20 minutes until the overhead electricity could be turned off, so they could disembark and continue on their journey by replacement bus. Services were replaced by buses for the afternoon but were restored by 7 p.m. A crane was used to rerail the train. KiwiRail intended to investigate the cause of the derailment.

On 23 April 2026, the line was blocked by a slip over the Wadestown passing loop.

On 6 June 2026, services were temporarily suspended after a partial derailment occurred at the south end of Khandallah station. A "down train" from Johnsonville to Wellington passed a departure signal at stop (red) and was directed onto the runaway line where it collided with a recently installed concrete stop block, preventing it falling into the properties below. The route was set to prevent the down train from entering the single-track section to Box Hill and Ngaio which was showing as occupied by a phantom train. Six people were injured and transported to hospital, two in a serious condition and four with minor injuries. The incident is being investigated by the Transport Accident Investigation Commission (TIAC).

== Future ==
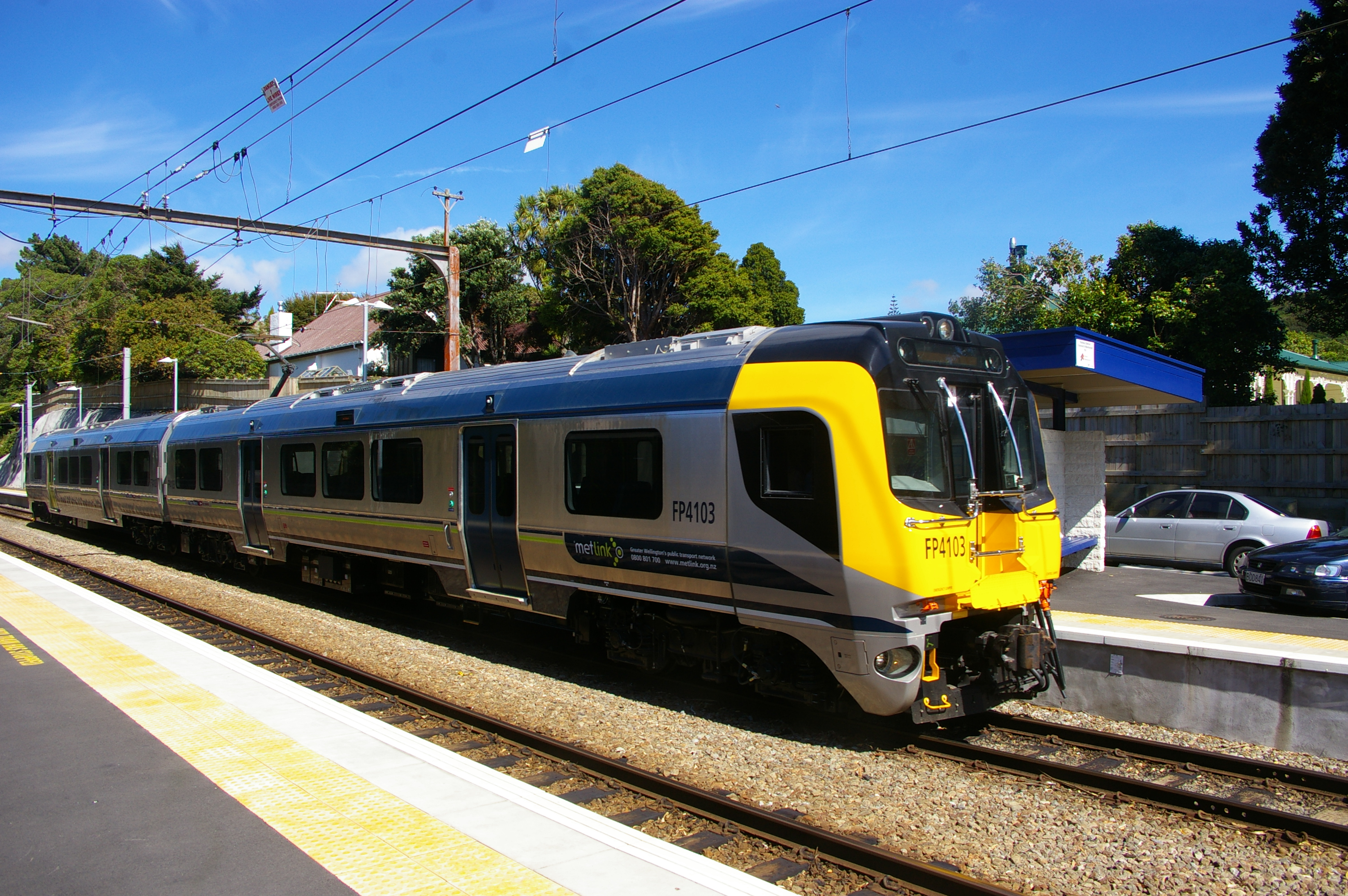
Matangi FP4103 at Khandallah Station on the Johnsonville Branch in March 2011

The proposed redevelopment of the Johnsonville Town Centre was to include improvements to the rail and bus terminal at Johnsonville; the terminal is now referred to as the Johnsonville Hub.

The Broderick Road overbridge immediately south of the Johnsonville Railway Station was upgraded by widening and lengthening in 2015 to include cycle lanes and extra road lanes over it. Provision is made for dual tracks underneath (formerly one track) into the station, as requested by the Greater Wellington Regional Council for future double-tracking.

Proposed infrastructure upgrades for the line include overhead line and mast replacement, sleeper replacement in tunnels and stabilisation of high risk slopes; to be completed in 2022.
