= Box Hill railway station, Wellington =

New Zealand railway station

Box Hill
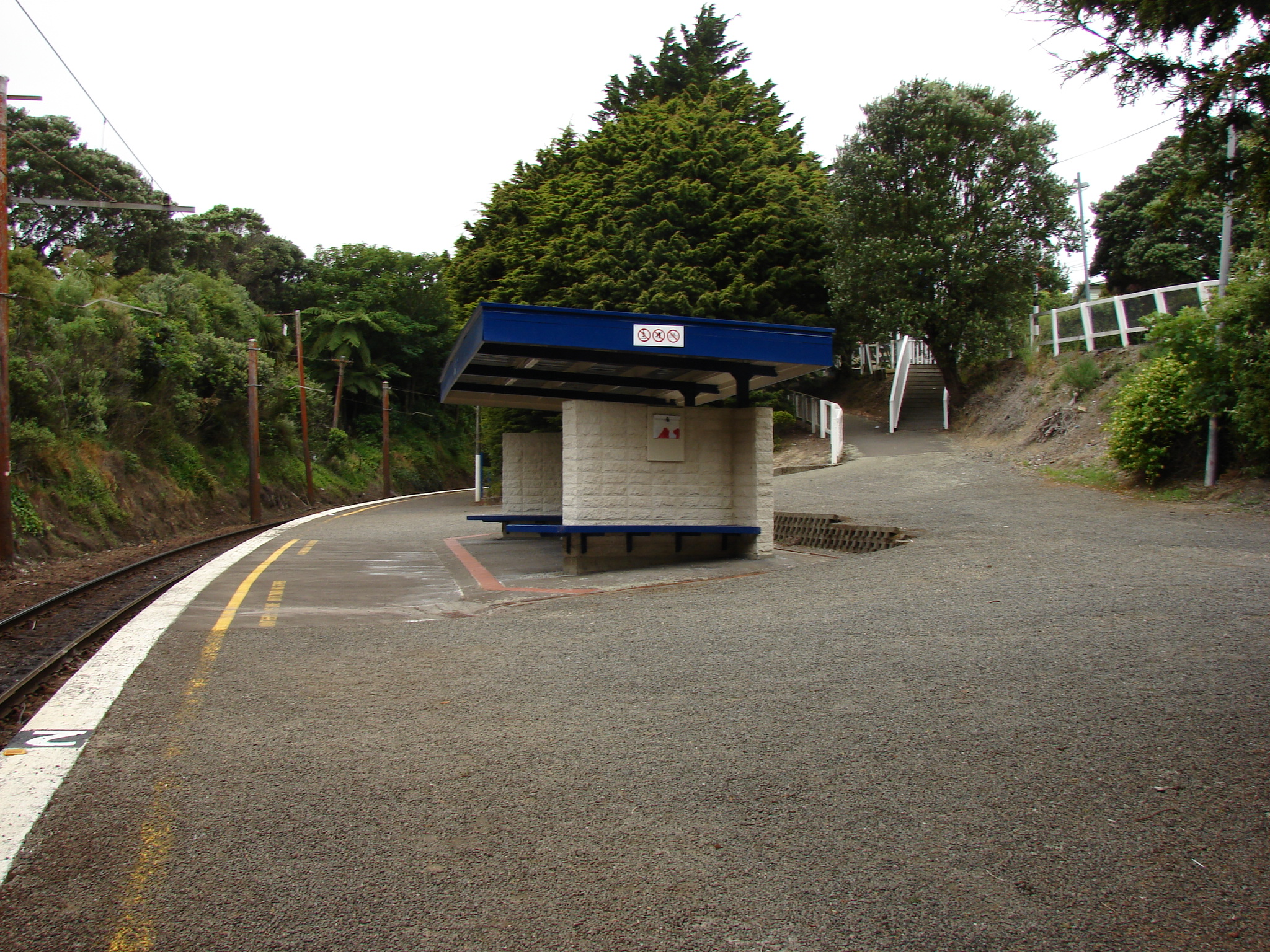

General information
- Location: Cockayne Road, Khandallah, Wellington, New Zealand
- Coordinates: 41°14′45.89″S 174°47′19.54″E
- System: Metlink commuter rail
- Owner: Greater Wellington Regional Council
- Line: Johnsonville Line
- Platforms: Single side
- Tracks: Main line (1)
- Connections: Bus services

Construction
- Parking: No
- Cycle facilities: No

Other information
- Fare zone: 3

History
- Opened: 16 July 1956
- Electrified: 2 June 1938

Services
Preceding station	Transdev Wellington	Following station
Khandallah towards Johnsonville	Johnsonville Line	Simla Crescent towards Wellington
Location

Box Hill railway station is one of eight stations on the Johnsonville Branch, a commuter branch railway north of Wellington in New Zealand's North Island. It serves the suburb of Khandallah. It is the only station on the line to be set below street level, and one of four on the line which is on a curve. The station is usually called Box Hill, but was signed by Tranz Metro as Boxhill on their platform signage.

Electric multiple unit trains are operated under the Metlink brand through this station in both directions to Johnsonville (to the north) and Wellington (to the south).

== History ==
Box Hill opened in 1956 as one of the more recent stations on the Johnsonville Branch line in an area where the railway runs roughly parallel to the street named "Box Hill" in the area formerly known as "Sentry-box Hill".

As part of the Johnsonville line upgrade in 2009–10, plans envisaged the Box Hill Station closing for about two months from 3 May 2010 for the resurfacing of the station platform and its extension to the south.

== Services ==
Trains run in both directions through this station, departing at half-hourly intervals, supplemented by a 13/13/26 schedule at peak times on week days.

The nearest bus routes are #25 and #26 which pass through Khandallah Village.

== Facilities ==
This station has a single side platform and passenger shelter. Pedestrian access is from Cockayne Road, and from the north end of the platform to Box Hill by a footpath under the adjacent road overbridge. There is no dedicated station car park available.

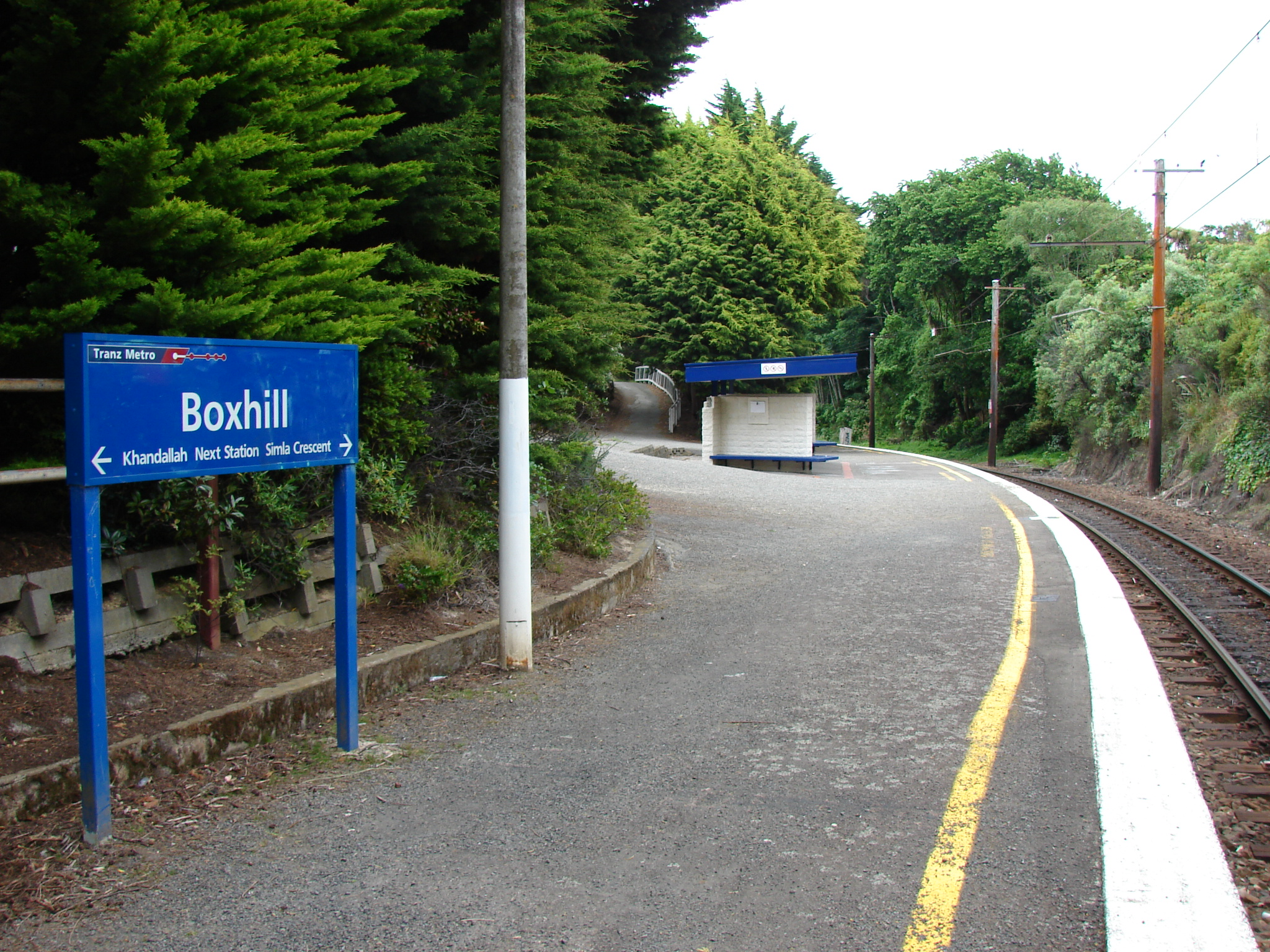
Looking south from the station platform
