= Johnsonville railway station =

New Zealand railway station

Johnsonville
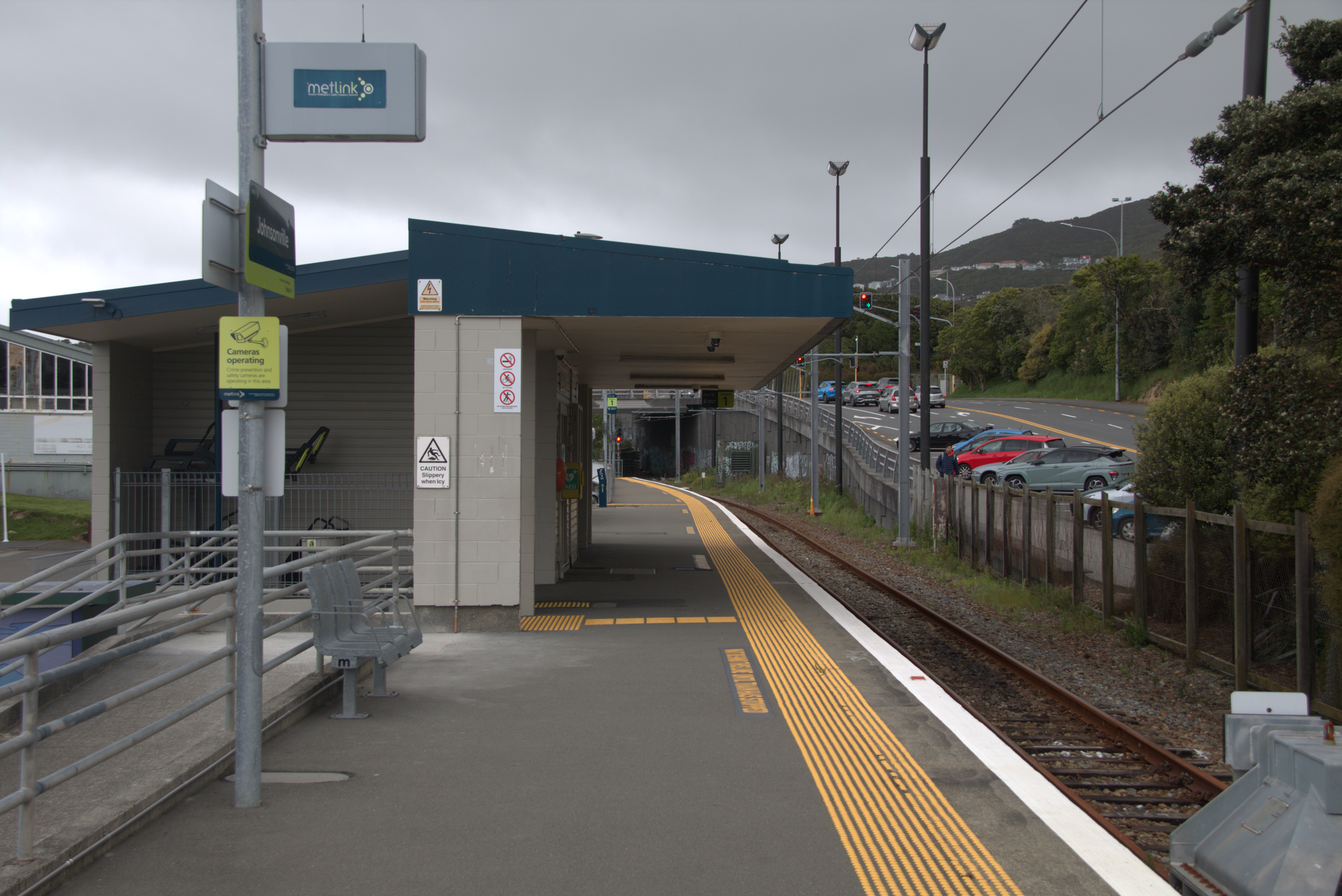

General information
- Location: Moorefield Road, Johnsonville, Wellington, New Zealand
- Coordinates: 41°13′24.01″S 174°48′17″E
- System: Metlink commuter rail
- Owner: Greater Wellington Regional Council
- Line: Johnsonville Line
- Platforms: Single side
- Tracks: Main line (1)

Construction
- Parking: 43 spaces

Other information
- Fare zone: 3

History
- Opened: 21 September 1885
- Closed: 13 April 1968 (freight)
- Rebuilt: 1984
- Electrified: 2 July 1938

Services
Preceding station	Transdev Wellington	Following station
Terminus	Johnsonville Line	Raroa towards Wellington
Location

Johnsonville railway station is the terminus of the Johnsonville Line, one of eight stations on the commuter branch railway north of Wellington in New Zealand’s North Island. It serves the suburb of Johnsonville and, as a bus interchange, attracts traffic from other suburbs to the north and east.

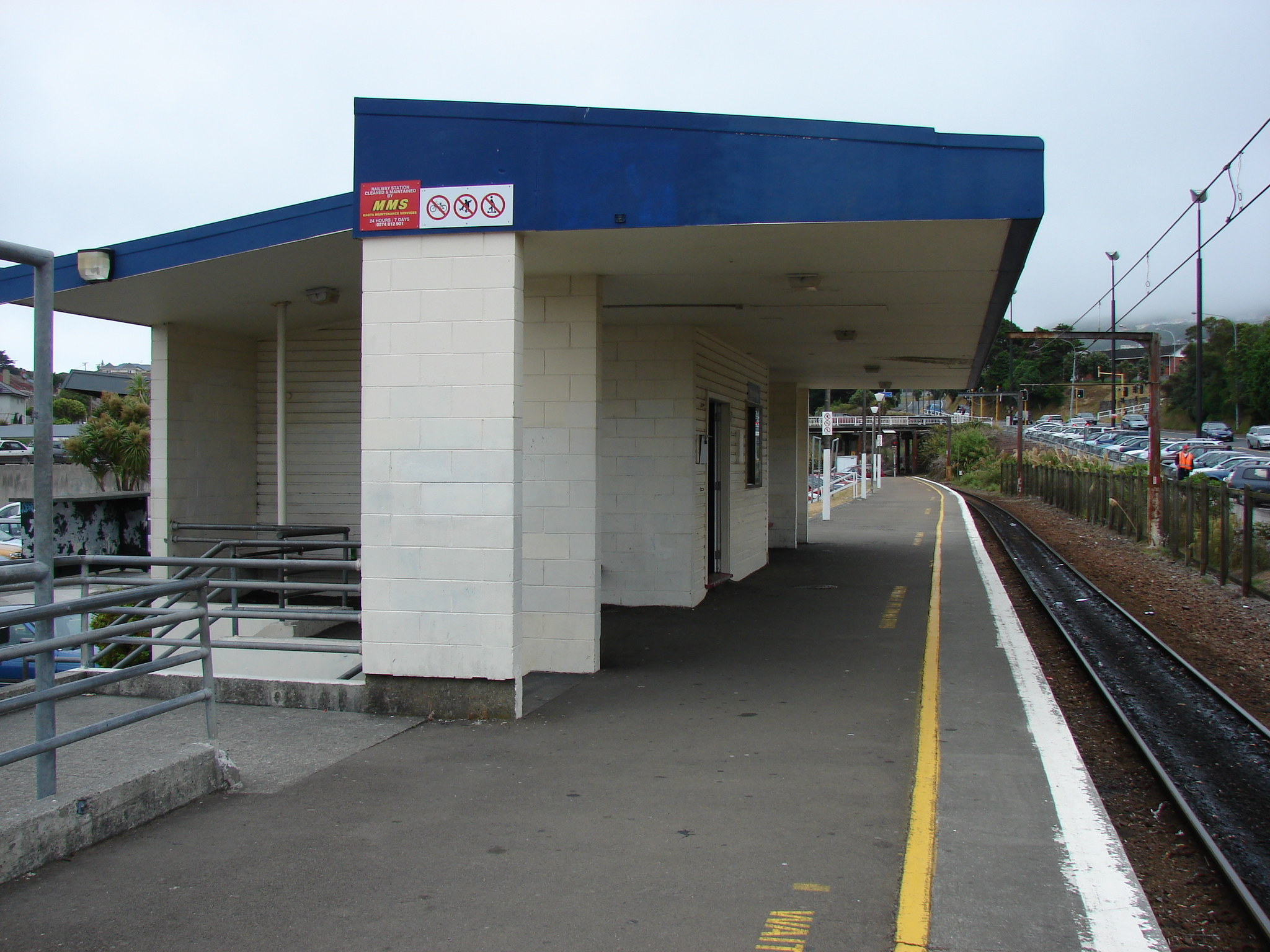
Johnsonville railway station, looking south.

The station is beside the Johnsonville Shopping Centre (also known as the "Johnsonville Mall"), a major regional shopping centre, which incorporates a Countdown supermarket. Numerous other businesses and organisations are nearby in a busy retail and commercial area.

Electric multiple unit trains are operated as part of the Metlink network to and from Wellington.

== History ==
The original Johnsonville station was constructed by the Wellington and Manawatu Railway Company and was completed in 1883 though it was not used until the commencement of services on 24 September 1885 with the station having been officially opened along with the Wellington to Paremata section of the line on the 21st. Johnsonville was one of three stations built by the WMR on the section of the Wellington – Manawatu Line that is now the Johnsonville Line. It remained a through station following government purchase of the line and its incorporation into the North Island Main Trunk Railway, for freight until 1935 and passengers until 19 June 1937, when the Tawa Flat deviation was opened to all traffic and the old line between Johnsonville and Tawa was closed. This coincided with the opening of the new Wellington railway station. While part of the NIMT, goods trains from Wellington often required a banking engine (e.g. "Jumbo"; NZR W^{J} class) for the steep grades up to Ngaio and Khandallah, and were rearranged at Johnsonville. The siding originally accommodated a locomotive and only 16 wagons and was extended in 1894 to take 34 wagons.

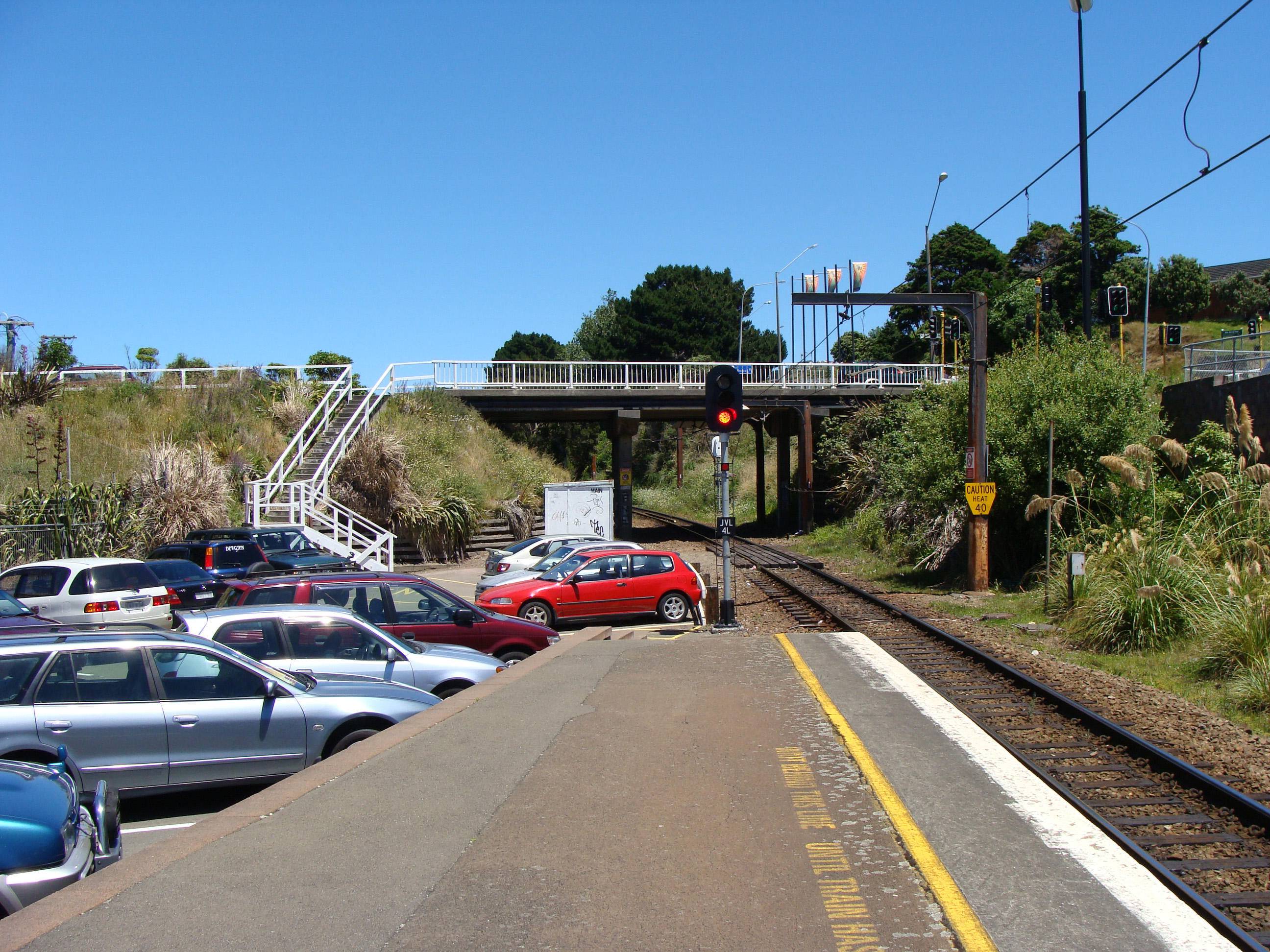
The (old) Broderick Road overbridge crosses the line just south of the station. This photo showing commuter "park and ride" parking was taken before the platform was lengthened in 2010

The station used to be a much more extensive facility. In the WMR days, the station consisted of a platform, wooden station building, sidings, and extensive stockyards. In 1913 the NZR general manager Mr Hiley said relief for traffic on the steep grades out of Wellington was urgent, but with the Great War in 1914 the Johnsonville rail yards were greatly enlarged as an interim measure. Level crossings in Johnsonville Road and from Bill Cutting Place to Frankmoore Avenue were closed. An island platform with a new station replacing the original WMR building in 1915, and a signal box plus two pedestrian overbridges spanning the yard and connecting to Wanaka Street were built. The main road was diverted and a new connecting street built.

Up to the last major reconfiguration of the yard, there were four roads beside the platform, the outermost of which served the goods shed, with a separate siding serving the stockyards. The track had been removed from one side of the island platform to make way for a car park.

Though the Railways Department wanted to keep the line closed, public pressure prevailed and the line was upgraded and electrified. The track between Johnsonville and Tawa was removed, and the new Johnsonville Line reopened on 2 July 1938 with Johnsonville as its terminus.

A porter-shunter at Johnonville was accidentally killed in March 1940 when he apparently stepped into the path of a train being shunted by an Ed locomotive.

Significant sources of goods traffic through this station included livestock from the Manawatu for the abattoir at Ngauranga and timber. Local pressure led to the transfer of livestock traffic to new sidings near Raroa station in 1958, though the Johnsonville sidings were not lifted until 1970.

In 1984, the yard was realigned to make way for an expansion of the nearby shopping facilities. The line was truncated; all sidings, ancillary buildings, and stockyards were removed; the platform was moved further south, closer to Broderick Road; and a new station building was constructed. These changes meant that there are no "run-around" facilities, making it difficult to operate locomotive-hauled trains on the line. A Countdown supermarket occupies the site of the former platform and station building.

As part of the Johnsonville line upgrading in 2009–10, upgrading work on the Johnsonville Station platform started on 26 April 2010. The station was not closed, although some sections of the platform and some adjacent "park and ride" car parks were not available at times.

== Services ==
Trains depart at half-hourly intervals for Wellington, increasing to quarter-hourly during peak times on week days.

The following Metlink bus services terminate at or connect through this station, referred to as the Johnsonville Hub on bus displays. From Wellington some go directly to the Johnsonville Hub, while others go via Helston Rd to Newlands or Paparangi first. There are 3 stops at the Johnsonville hub, Services that go from Stop A Include

- 1 Island Bay - Johnsonville - Churton Park/Grenada Village/Johnsonville West
- 19 Johnsonville - Churton Park - Johnsonville
- 19e (Peak Hours Only) Johnsonville - Churton Park - Johnsonville (Extended to Wellington
- 60 Porirua - Tawa - Johnsonville
- 60e (Peak Hours Only) Porirua - Tawa - Johnsonville - Wellington

Services that go from Stop B Include

- 1 Johnsonville West/Churton Park/Grenada Village - Island Bay
- 19 Johnsonville - Churton Park - Johnsonville
- 19e (Peak Hours Only) Johnsonville - Churton Park - Johnsonville (Extended to Wellington)
- 22 Johnsonville - Mairangi - Kelburn - Wellington
- 24 Johnsonville - Broadmeadows - Wellington - Miramar Heights
- 60 Porirua - Tawa - Johnsonville (drop off only)
- 60e (Peak Hours Only) Porirua - Tawa - Johnsonville (drop off only)
- 647 (School Bus) Churton Park South - Johnsonville - Onslow College
- 673 (School Bus) Churton Park - Broadmeadows - Ngaio - Cardinal McKeefry, Otari, & Marsden Schools
- 681 (School Bus) Churton Park North - Johnsonville - Onslow College

Services that go from Stop C are drop off and school bus only (excluding 52, 56)

- 22 Johnsonville - Mairangi - Kelburn - Wellington
- 24 Johnsonville - Broadmeadows - Wellington - Miramar Heights
- 52 Johnsonville - Newlands - Wellington
- 56 (Peak Hours Only) Johnsonville - Paparangi - Wellington
- 631 Newlands College & Intermediate School - Paparangi - Johnsonville
- 646 St Brigid's School & Onslow College - Johnsonville - Churton Park
- 648 Raroa Normal Intermediate School - Johnsonville - Churton Park North
- 673 Churton Park - Broadmeadows - Ngaio - Cardinal McKeefry, Otari, & Marsden Schools
- 682 Raroa Normal Intermediate School & Onslow College - Johnsonville - Churton Park South

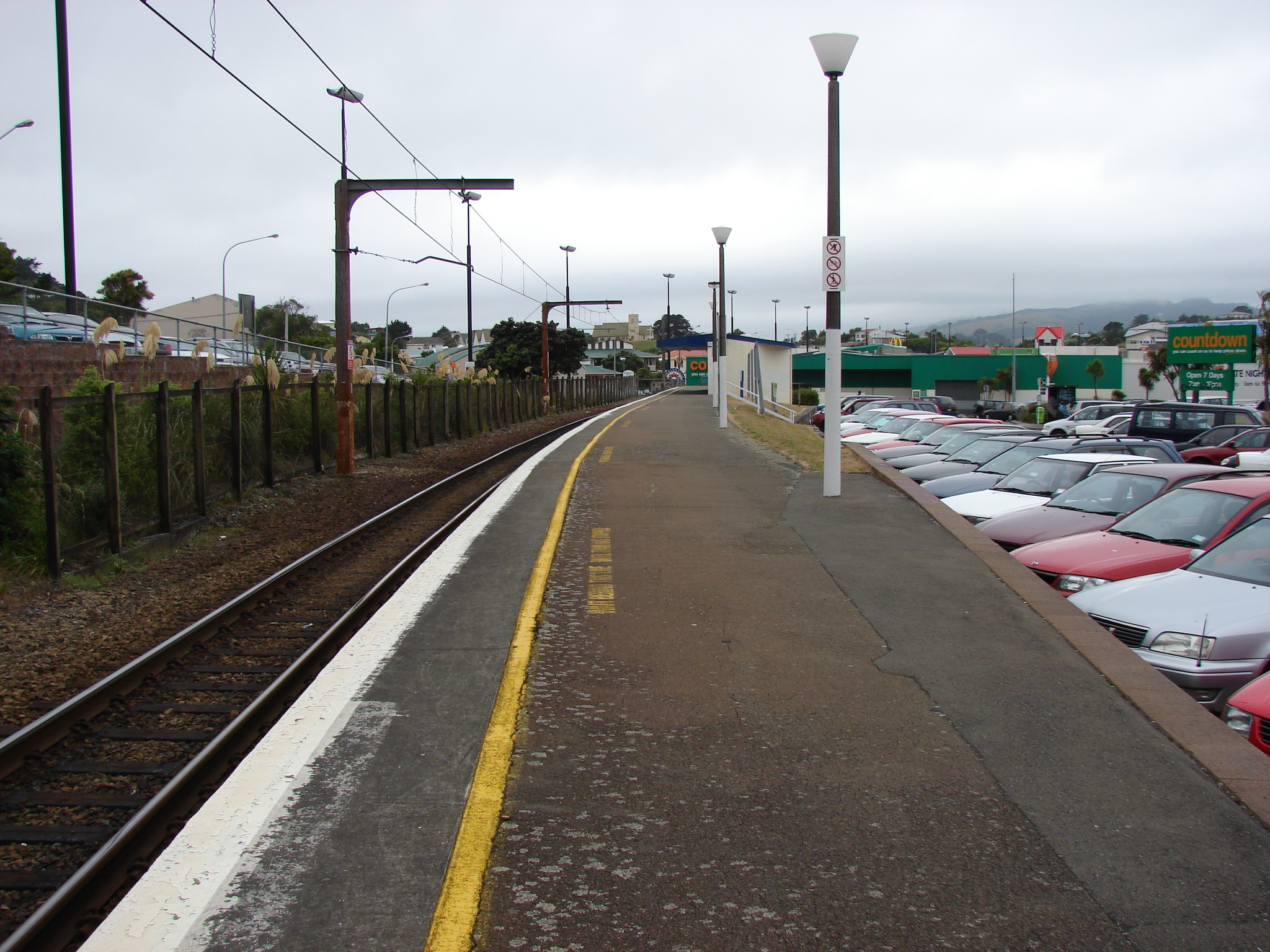
Looking north along the station platform.

== Facilities ==
This station has a single side platform and station building, in which operates a small convenience store. It is also staffed on a limited basis for ticket sales. Access is from Moorefield Road or Johnsonville Mall.

Behind the station building are the bus interchange and mall car park. There is "park and ride" commuter parking by the south end of the platform separate from the Mall car park, and further parking in Moorefield Road across the line and north of the traffic lights.

The rail overbridge immediately south of the station was being upgraded in late 2014–15 to include cycle lanes and extra road lanes. Provision is made for dual tracks underneath (currently one track) into the station, as requested by the Greater Wellington Regional Council. With the temporary loss of some park and ride commuter car parks by the south end of the station and in Burma Road, additional car parks were provided at Raroa railway station.
