= Te Aro Extension =

Railway line in New Zealand

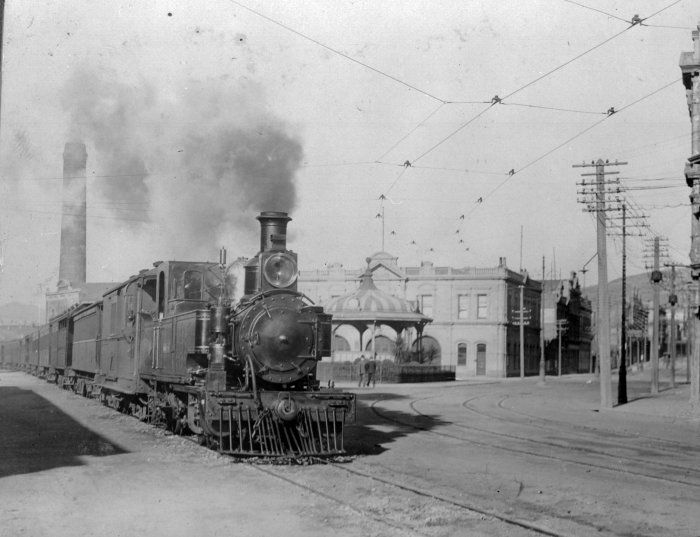
- An NZR R class locomotive hauling a passenger train on Jervois Quay, Wellington, c. 1900, on the Te Aro Extension

Overview
- Status: Closed
- Owner: Railways Department
- Locale: Wellington, New Zealand
- Termini: Lambton; Te Aro
- Stations: 1

Service
- Type: commuter rail
- System: New Zealand Government Railways (NZGR)
- Operator: Railways Department

History
- Opened: 1893-03-27
- Closed: 1917-04-23

Technical
- Line length: 1.81 km
- Number of tracks: single
- Character: metropolitan
- Track gauge: 3 ft 6 in (1,067 mm)

The Te Aro Extension, also known as the Te Aro Branch, was a short branch line railway in Wellington, New Zealand, continuing the Wairarapa Line southwards. It operated from 1893 until 1917.

It should not be confused with the Te Aro Tramway, which was a trestle causeway built in 1883 as part of foreshore reclamation work.

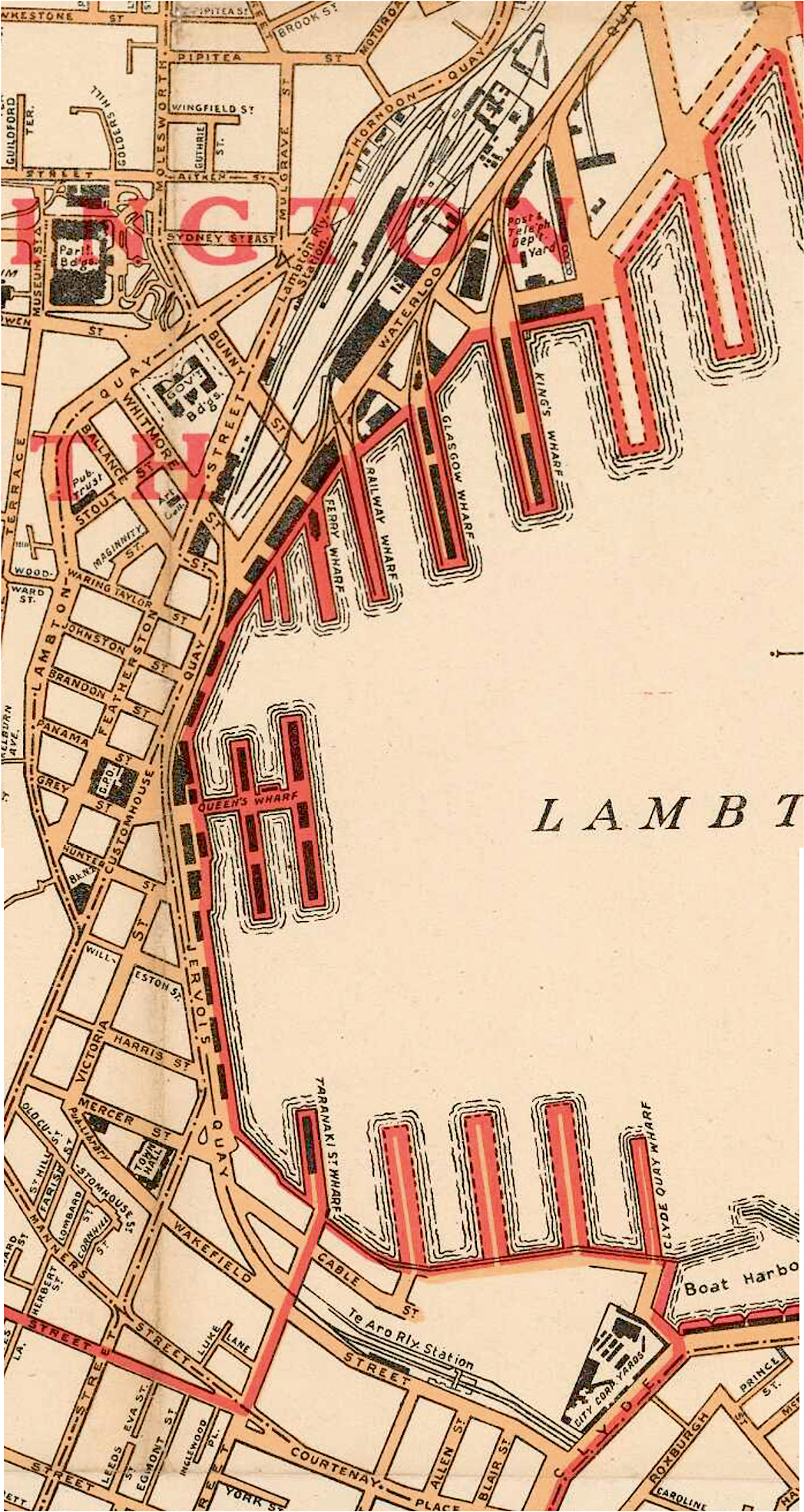
1919 map showing the line

== Construction ==
In the early 1890s, Wellington had two railway stations: Thorndon station of the Wellington and Manawatu Railway Company, whose line ran up the west coast towards Palmerston North; and Lambton station of the New Zealand Railways Department, which served the Wairarapa Line. The present Wellington railway station on Bunny Street did not open until 1937. The Railways Department sought to provide improved access to central Wellington, and began work on an extension from Lambton station to Te Aro, with the intention to continue the line to Island Bay. The 1.8 km long Te Aro Extension was opened on 30 March 1893, and Te Aro was the terminus for the line's lifetime, with no further work undertaken. The extension can be seen as either a branch line in its own right, or as an extension of the Wairarapa Line; it was not an extension of the North Island Main Trunk railway.

NZR R class at Post Office Square c1900

== Operation ==
The Extension never achieved the degree of usefulness envisaged. It would have been satisfactorily located had it been built in the 1870s, but the changing nature of Wellington city meant that by the time it was built it did not provide the central city access that was intended. Nearby businesses complained about the noise and dirt from the steam locomotives, and it was a disruption to traffic on busy city streets.

The line was built with no facilities for freight handling at Te Aro. Passenger traffic was the line's mainstay, with 212 services a week, approximately 30 a day, in 1904. Special trains operated from Te Aro to the end of the Hutt Park Railway whenever the Wellington Racing Club had a horse racing meeting, though this ceased after 1905 when the Racing Club relocated to Trentham. Competition from Wellington's trams led to a decline to only 62 services a week by 1916. Closure had been recommended by the General Manager of Railways in 1914, and this took place in March 1917 and the track was removed between 31 January and 27 March 1923.

== Today ==
The development of central Wellington has obliterated most traces of the extension. The corner of a petrol station on Whitmore St once reflected the curve that the line took through that part of the city, but redevelopment has removed this final trace of the railway. In 2007, the demolition of a warehouse building on Tory St revealed remains of the still laid track and platform of the Te Aro Railway Station. After consultation with the city council and Historic Places Trust, the still in situ location of the remains were recorded and photographed. The station site was reburied and built over.
