= Pipitea =

Pipitea can mean:

- Pipitea, New Zealand, a suburb of Wellington, New Zealand
- Pipitea Marae, a meeting ground in Pipitea, Wellington, New Zealand
- Pipitea Point railway station, a railway station in Pipitea, Wellington, New Zealand
- Pipitea Point Railway Workshops, Wellington's first railway workshops
- Pipitea (planet), a planet in the Tucana constellation
