= Te Aro railway station =

Defunct railway station in New Zealand

Te Aro
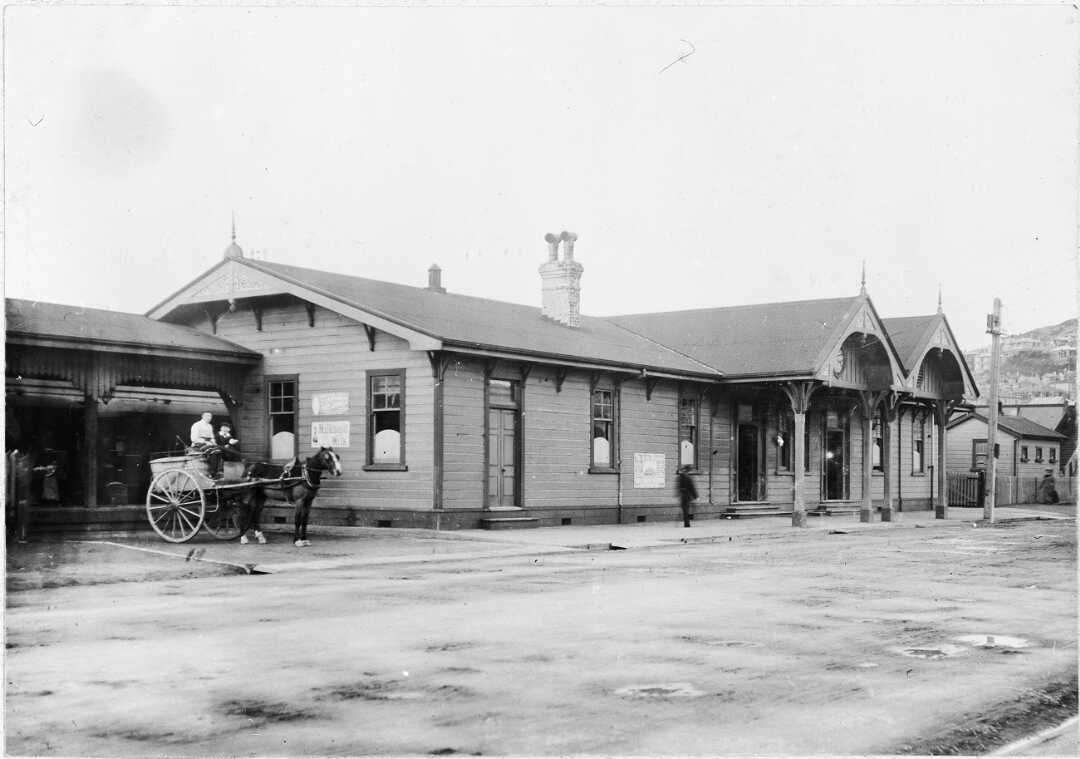
- Te Aro railway station circa 1904

General information
- Location: corner Wakefield and Tory Streets
- Coordinates: 41°17′30.28″S 174°46′54.47″E
- System: New Zealand Government Railways (NZGR)
- Owner: Railways Department
- Line: Te Aro Extension
- Platforms: Side
- Tracks: Main line (2)

History
- Opened: 27 March 1893
- Closed: 23 April 1917
Location

Te Aro railway station was a station in Wellington, New Zealand, near what is now the corner of Wakefield and Tory Streets. Opened in 1893 it was one of only three stations in the city - the other two were Wellington railway station on Featherston Street, renamed Lambton railway station in December 1908, which was the main New Zealand Railways Department station, and Thorndon railway station off Thorndon Quay, the southern terminus of the private Wellington and Manawatu Railway.

Terminus of the short-lived Te Aro Extension of the Hutt Valley Line and Wairarapa Line it can also be regarded as a branch line. It was closed in 1917 and the rails lifted soon after.

== Passengers, fruit and vegetables and milk ==
The line was provided to extend Wellington passenger services through the centre of the Wellington CBD from the main Lambton station on the northern side of Wellington. "Apart from its passenger traffic, it handled the bulk of the city's produce, which came through Te Aro consigned to the Courtenay Place markets ... [and] it received the city's milk supply prior to distribution." Otherwise there were no freight facilities provided, although Hoy's sketch of the station layout shows a Defence Siding & Store, plus three sidings, a footbridge and water tanks.

== Closure ==
Patronage was affected by the Wellington tramway system, electrified in 1904. A new general manager of railways condemned the station in 1913 describing as uneconomic any agreement to the pleas of the Wellington Chamber of Commerce to have it retained it as a purely goods station and the line was closed in 1917.

In 1923 the buildings became an extension of the Te Aro fruit and vegetable market (Market Gardeners Co-operative Limited) and remained in their use until 1958.

== Location ==
In 2007, the demolition of The Warehouse building on Tory St revealed remains of the track and platform of the station. The site is now occupied by the Museum Hotel and Monument Apartments. The remains of the two platforms, their tracks and some point rodding were all removed in 2007. See external links to images.
