= Wellington railway station =

Railway station in New Zealand

Wellington
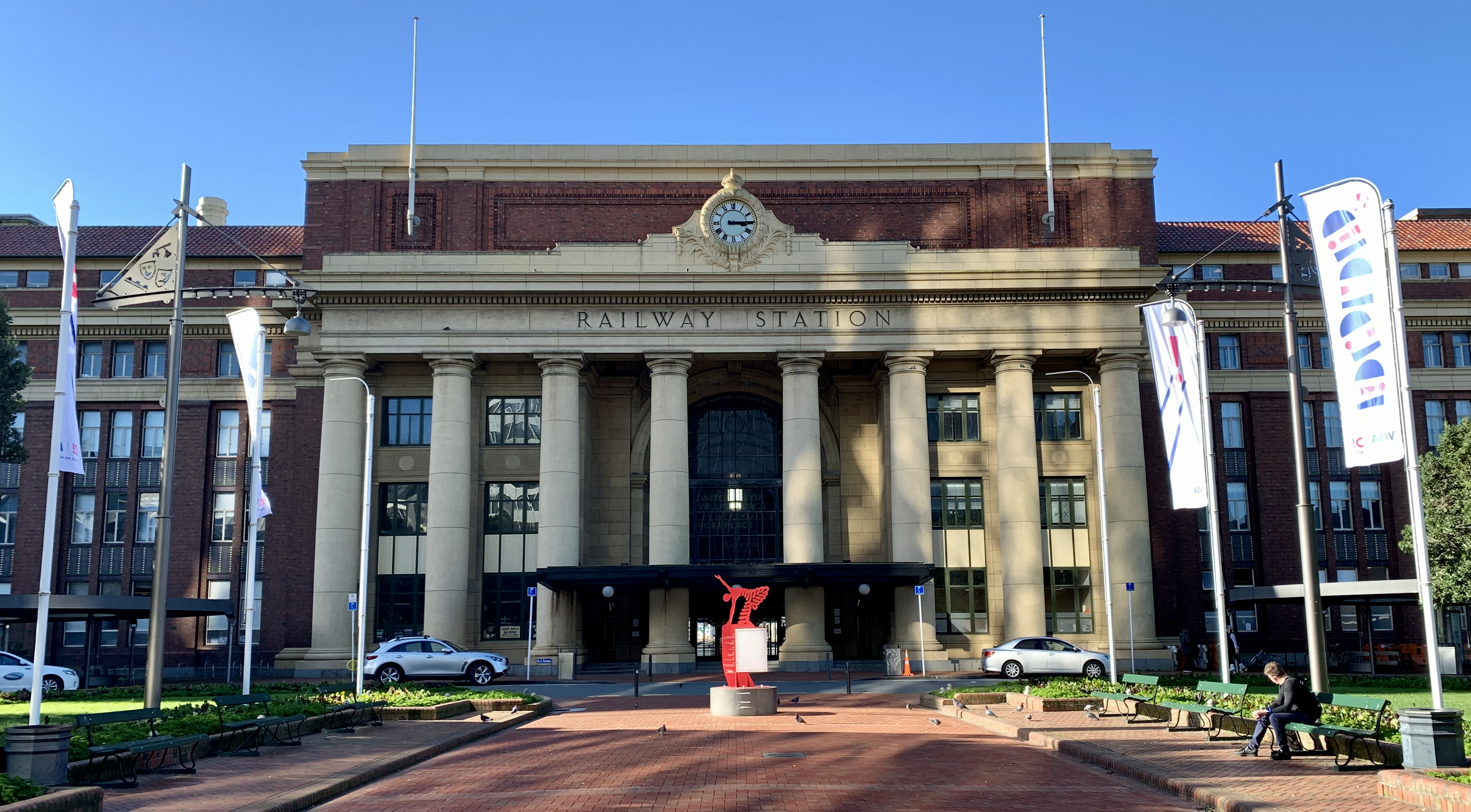
- Wellington railway station façade, 2021.

General information
- Location: Bunny Street, Pipitea, Wellington, New Zealand
- Coordinates: 41°16′43″S 174°46′51″E
- System: Metlink regional rail
- Owner: New Zealand Railways Corporation
- Lines: North Island Main Trunk; Wairarapa Line; Johnsonville Line
- Platforms: 9
- Connections: Services

Construction
- Structure type: At-grade terminal station
- Parking: Yes
- Accessible: most Metlink services (operated by Transdev Wellington)

Other information
- Station code: WELL (Metlink); WLG (KiwiRail Network)
- Fare zone: 1

History
- Opened: 19 June 1937; 89 years ago
- Electrified: 14 July 1938; 88 years ago

Services
Preceding station	Transdev Wellington	Following station
Crofton Downs towards Johnsonville	Johnsonville Line	Terminus
Ngauranga towards Melling	Melling Line	Terminus
Ngauranga towards Upper Hutt	Hutt Valley Line	Terminus
Takapu Road towards Waikanae	Kāpiti Line	Terminus
Petone towards Masterton	Wairarapa Connection	Terminus
Preceding station	KiwiRail	Following station
Paraparaumu towards Palmerston North	Capital Connection	Terminus
Takapu Road towards Waitematā	North Island Main Trunk	Terminus
Preceding station	Great Journeys New Zealand	Following station
Paraparaumu towards Auckland Strand	Northern Explorer	Terminus

Heritage New Zealand – Category 1
- Designated: 25 September 1986
- Reference no.: 1452
Location
- Location within New Zealand

Wellington railway station, Wellington Central station, or simply Wellington station, is the main railway station serving Wellington, New Zealand, and is the southern terminus of the North Island Main Trunk, Wairarapa Line and Johnsonville Line.

The station opened in June 1937, replacing the two previous Wellington termini, Lambton and Thorndon. The building was originally the head office of the New Zealand Railways Department or NZR. Today, the building houses the Wellington office of KiwiRail in the east wing of the building.

A number of alterations have been made to the railway station over the years. The building was registered on 25 September 1986 as a Category 1 Historic Place by Heritage New Zealand.

== History ==
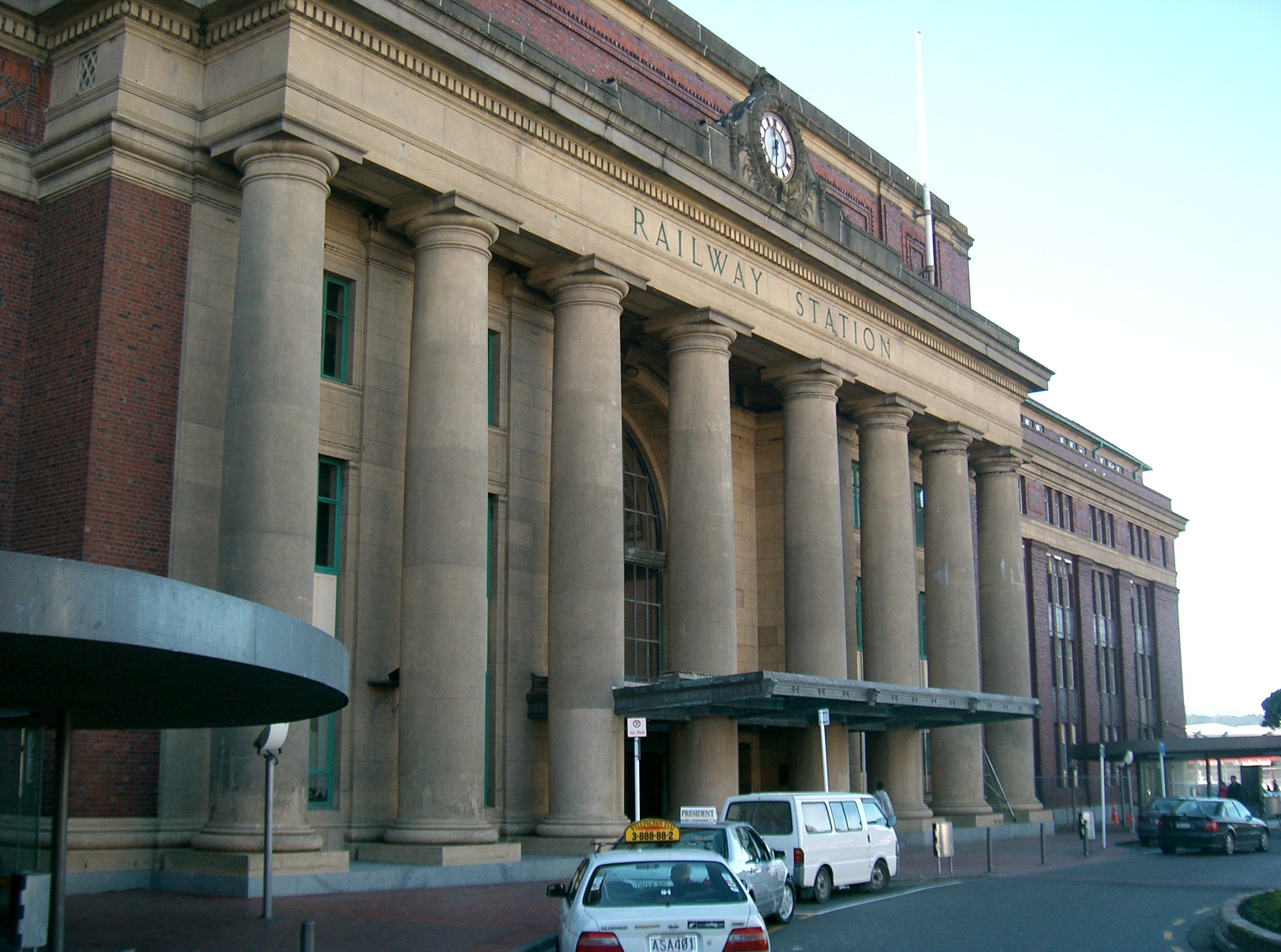
Entrance to Wellington Railway Station in 2006.

=== Development ===
The capital's first Wellington railway station was a group of small buildings at Pipitea Point built in 1874 on earthquake-raised harbour floor for a temporary terminus of the railway line to the Hutt Valley. A series of reclamations allowed the line to reach well down Featherston Street and in 1880 a new Wellington railway station was, as it turned out, temporarily placed near the goods station for the new Railway Wharf. Traffic at the wharf quickly grew beyond expectations. The 1880 building was pulled north on rollers in 1885 to a less congested site on Featherston Street opposite the junction of Mulgrave Street and Sydney Street now Kate Sheppard Place.

The third site named Wellington railway station was only the passenger terminus for the Hutt and Wairarapa lines. After the Government took control of the Manawatu line in December 1908, the Wellington railway station was renamed Wellington Lambton station and the Manawatu station which became the terminus for the North Island Main Trunk was named Wellington Thorndon station. The Thorndon station had been opened in September 1885 by the private Wellington and Manawatu Railway Company (WMR). The Government bought the line from its shareholders in 1908 to incorporate the Manawatu line into their system.

Once both stations were under government control, public pressure began to build for a single terminal. In 1908, a joint reclamation scheme was drawn up by the Railways Department and the Wellington Harbour Board and in 1912 a new railway station was proposed, to supersede the Lambton and Thorndon stations. The government decided on a co-ordinated development that included a new station building, and after an agreement in 1922 between the Railways Department and the Wellington Harbour Board, the reclamation of about 68 acres (27 hectares) incorporating a new double-track line, train marshalling areas, goods yards and sheds and using fill from the Tawa Flat Deviation. The Thorndon reclamation began in 1923 and was on track to be completed by 1932, which allowed the government in 1929 to confirm that Bunny Street would be the location of a new station, so removing the inconvenience of two separate stations.

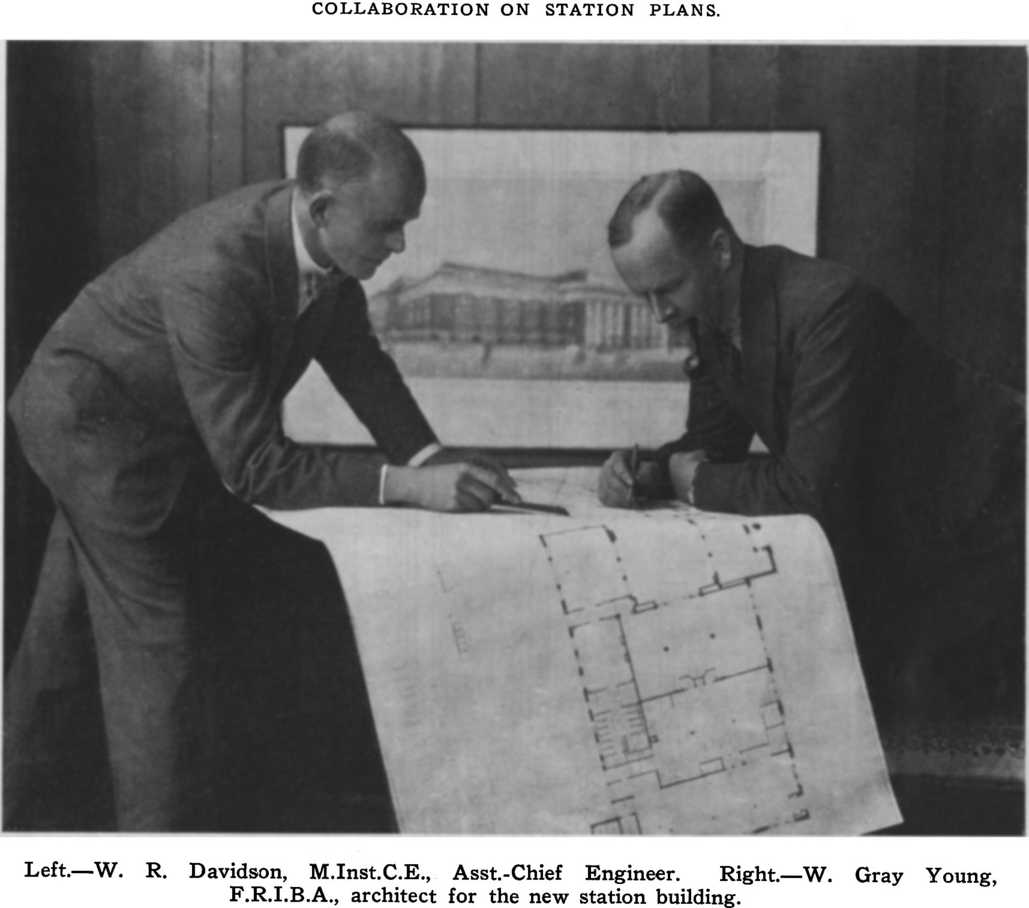

In 1929, W. Gray Young, an architect known for his neo-Georgian styles, of the Wellington architectural firm of Gray Young, Morton & Young, was selected (without a design competition) to design the new station, over the Auckland firm of Gummer & Ford, which had designed Auckland railway station. Gray Young, Morton and Young was formed in 1923 and consisted of William Gray Young, Hubert Morton and Gray Young's brother Jack. The firm had recently finished large commissions for Victoria University, designing the Stout Building (1930) Weir House (1930), and later the Kirk Building (1938).

The need to review building techniques after the 1931 Hawke's Bay earthquake and the impact of the Depression on finances delayed the government formally committing to the project until June 1933.

=== Design ===
As the planned location was on reclaimed land, test piles were driven in 1928 to test the quality of the soil. On the basis of the test results the decision was made to use Vibro cast-in-place piles to support the structure. The building was the first major New Zealand structure to incorporate a significant measure of earthquake resistance.

Gray Young was paid a 4% fee based on the initially estimated cost of £470,000. This cost rose to £483,000 once the quantity surveying firm of Maltby & Sommerville compiled a detailed quantity schedule, for which they were paid 1% of the estimated cost. Because of the impact of the Depression on Government finances, it was decided to reduce the cost by eliminating a mailroom and a section of the West wing along Featherston Street and by transferring the £28,000 cost of the platforms and verandahs to a separate budget. As a result, the official estimated cost of the station was reduced to £350,000. To encourage employment of workers out of work due to the Depression the project received a subsidy of £34,000 (10% of the estimated cost) from the Employment Board.

The building is a U-shaped structure with the longest leg 105.5 metres (346 ft) long and 23.5 metres (77 ft) high. Because of delays in importing the specialised boring equipment needed to install the cast-in-place piles called for in the original design, the decision was made to use 1615 15 x 15 inch and 16 x 16 inch reinforced concrete piles. These were driven by a steam-powered hammer. On top of the piles a five- and six-storey steel-framed structure was built. The steel was encased in reinforced concrete and 1.75 million bricks. 21,000 cubic yards of aggregate from the Hutt River with cement from Whangarei were mixed on-site to create the concrete. The bricks used for the outer cladding were of a special design, with slots to accommodate vertical corrosion–resistant steel rods that reinforced the brickwork and bound it to the structural members. 1500 tons of decorative Hanmer and Whangārei granite and marble were used to clad the interior and the entranceway. 2500 gallons of paint were used. The roof was clad in Marseille tiles.

The main entrance is on the south side via a colonnade of eight 13-metre- [42-foot]-high Doric columns opening into a large booking hall decorated with delicately mottled dados extending to a high vaulted ceiling.

The glazed-roof concourse contained waiting rooms and toilets, a large dining room, a barber shop, book and fruit stalls and a first aid room. There was a nursery on the top floor to allow parents to leave their children while they shopped or waited for their train.

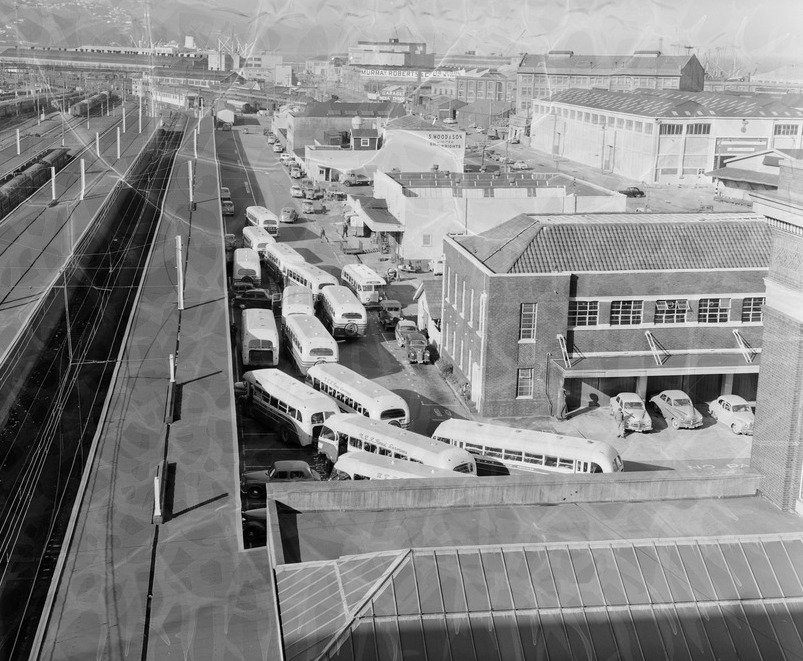
Road Services buses at Platform 9 in 1957

When completed the station was New Zealand's largest building, partly covering 0.6 hectares and with a combined floor area of two hectares. It was designed to accommodate the 675 staff of the Railways Department head office and the Wellington district office, which until then had been accommodated in 11 leased buildings throughout the city.

The platforms, designed to accommodate up to 12 carriages, are made of concrete covered with a sealed surface under verandahs held up by railway irons.

Platform 9 was designed to be a roadway without rails for the terminus for certain services provided by New Zealand Railways Road Services.

A park was created in the forecourt with lawns and paths of paving stones with brick edging arranged in a herringbone pattern.

=== Construction ===
The construction tender closed on 25 September 1933, extended by two weeks in an attempt to encourage local manufacturers to offer locally manufactured materials. Twelve tenders were received, with Fletcher Building the lowest at £339,000. The next lowest was £350,000 from J T Julian & Son, who had constructed a significant part of the Auckland railway station.

Fletchers was awarded what was believed to be the largest single-building contract let in New Zealand up to that time, to which a performance bond of £3000 was applied.

Fletchers appointed 26-year-old Joe Craig to manage his first major project. His prior experience had been in the construction of Chateau Tongariro, Massey College and earthquake reconstruction in Hastings. His management skills, supported by a large team of experienced foremen and a close working relationship with the architect, ensured that construction progressed very smoothly on a project that was very profitable for Fletchers.

Work commenced on site in January 1934 with a workforce of 12, which built up to 161 in January 1936. Fletchers reduced the cost of the construction steel to £70,000 from an estimated £85,000 by directly importing it rather than purchasing it from local steel merchants, and had it fabricated on-site by Wm Cable Ltd.

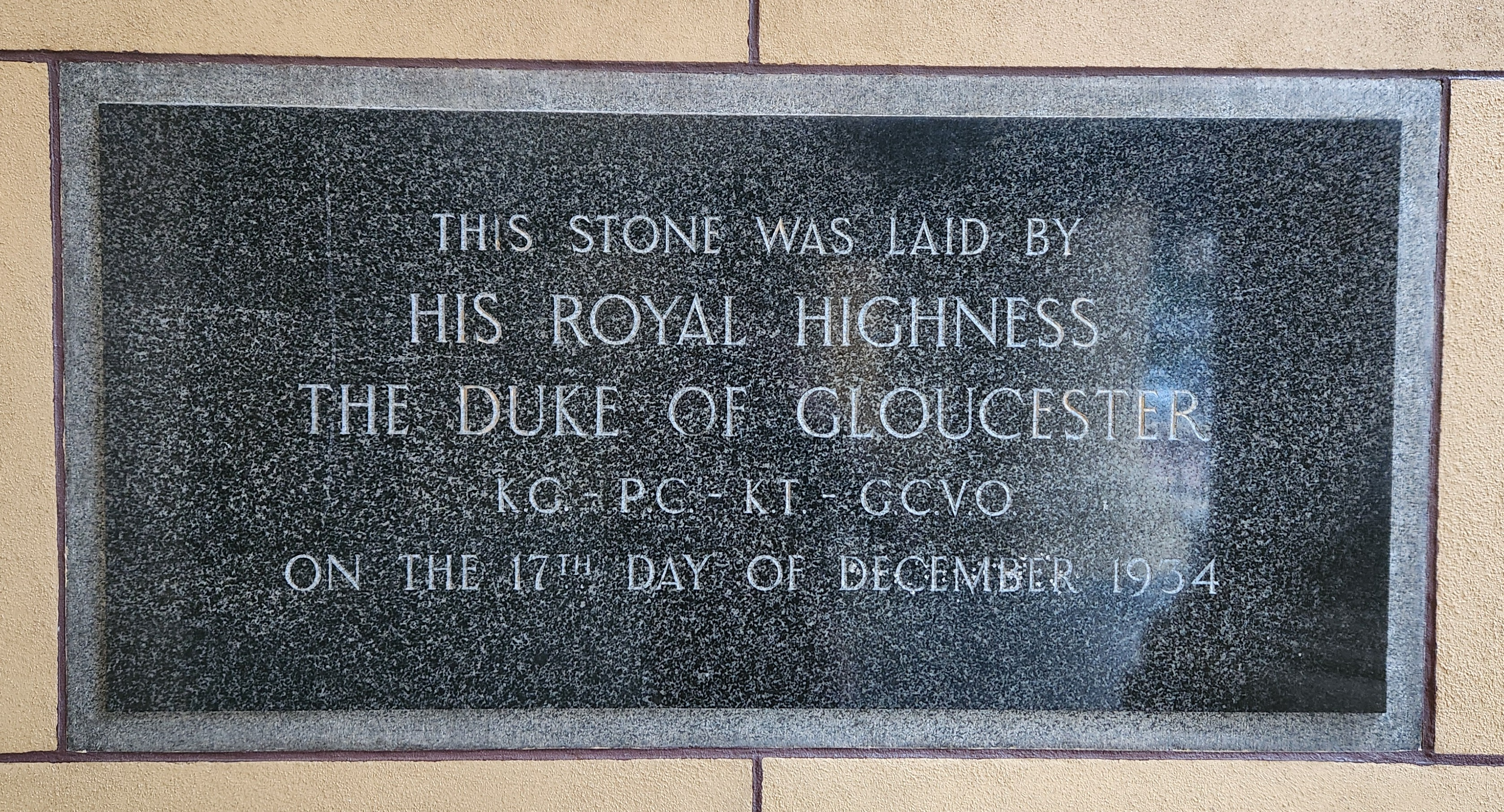
The foundation stone

Progress was rapid, with 1500 of the piles driven by the time the foundation stone was laid on 17 December 1934 by the Duke of Gloucester, an occasion witnessed by an estimated 5,000 people.

The contract was expanded to include the construction of an electric substation (commenced 1936) at a cost of £2022 and a locomotive maintenance workshop (commenced 1936) along the Thorndon Quay side of the railway yard. This cost £37,406 and is still in use.

In August 1938, to accommodate increasing staff numbers, work commenced on the construction of the section of the Featherston Street Wing removed from the original design to reduce its cost. This was undertaken as a separate project at a cost of £59,662.

A two-storey brick building with a mansard roof containing a social hall and a garage was built in 1937 facing Waterloo Quay to the north of the East wing, at a cost of £15,000. The garage was on the ground floor with the social hall occupying part of the ground floor and the entire first storey. The garage also incorporated rooms for the chauffeur to the Railways Department's General Manager.

=== Opening ===
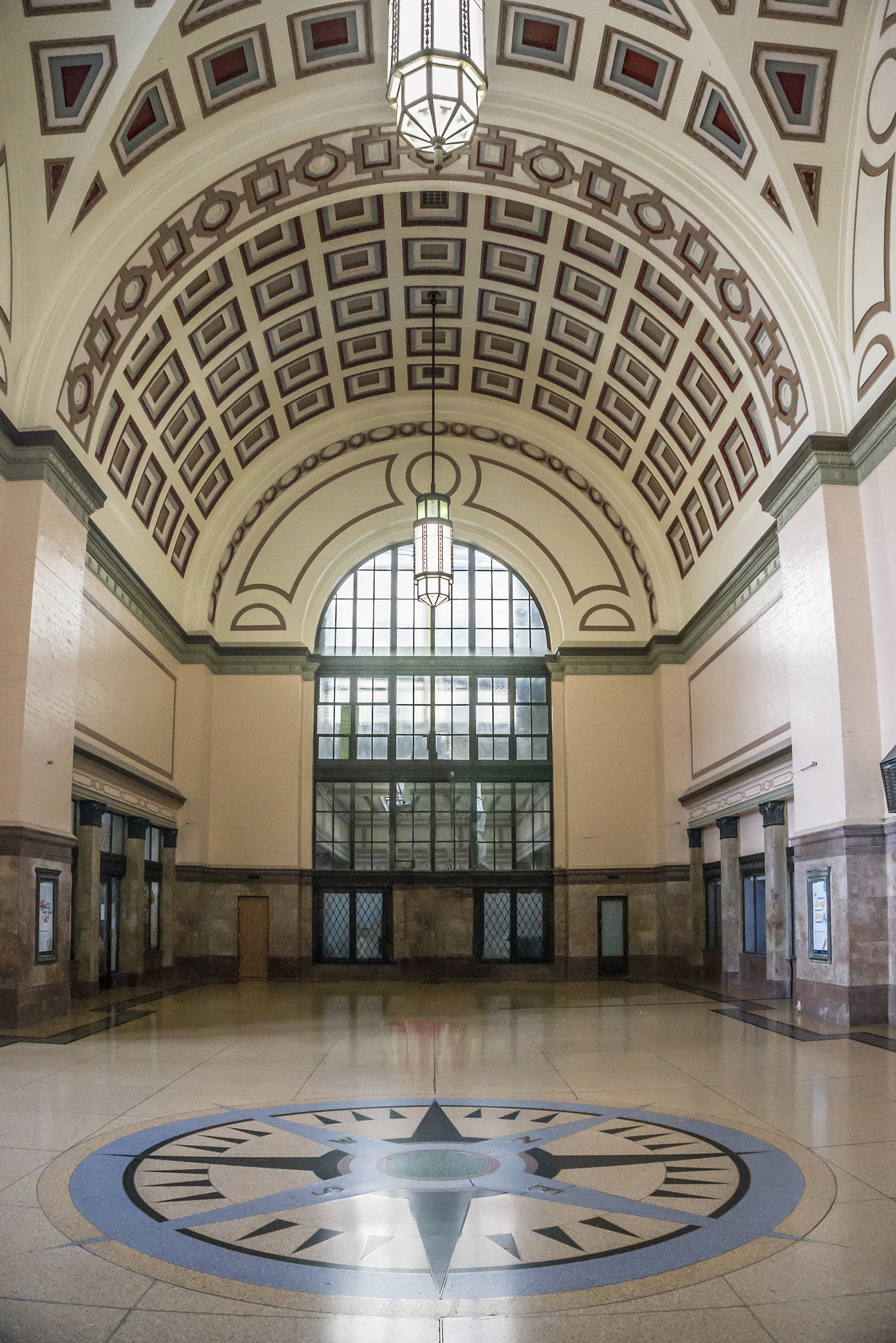
Wellington railway station's booking hall in 2013

The station was opened on 19 June 1937 by the Governor-General of New Zealand, Viscount Galway. Lambton closed on 19 June 1937 and Thorndon on 8 June 1937.

=== NZR head office ===
The Railways Head office had been combined in an ornate three-story brick building at 75 Featherston Street in 1903. The foundation stone was laid by the Duke of Cornwall (later King George V) on 21 June 1901. One of the first Wellington buildings reinforced against earthquakes, the style was Classical Baroque and Jacobean; ornamented in white Oamaru stone with carved cornicles and balustrades and roofed with Marsiette tiles. In 1937 it became the Defence Department headquarters but the decorative features, high roof and lighting turrets were removed, and it was demolished in 1982.

In 1982, the New Zealand Railways Corporation replaced the Railways Department. The application of a more commercial attitude to the running of the organisation resulted in a large reduction in staff employed at the Wellington railway station. Due to the reduction of railway staff numbers in the 1980s, large parts of the building became underutilised.

In 1991, as a result of a major restructuring of the New Zealand Railways Corporation, ownership of the land and buildings was retained by the Railways Corporation while a new organisation known as New Zealand Rail Limited took over rail operations including freight distribution, commuter and long-distance passenger services and the Interisland ferry service. Both organisations retained offices in the building. In 1993, New Zealand Rail Limited was sold to a private business consortium, which became Tranz Rail Holdings Limited in 1995. In 2000, Tranz Rail moved its head office to Auckland but retained space for operational management of the railway network. In 2004, Tranz Rail was sold and renamed Toll NZ Ltd, which then sold the track and infrastructure back to the Railways Corporation.

=== Victoria University of Wellington west wing ===
Between August 2003 and October 2008, the building was refurbished at a cost of NZ$14.6 million to house part of Victoria University in the West wing and Toll NZ (now KiwiRail) in the East wing. This work included a seismic upgrade, restoration and refurbishment, and installation of three new lifts and dedicated access in the southwest corner to the university wing from the concourse. The architect was Athfield Architects with construction undertaken by Fletcher Construction. As part of this reorganisation of the building, the 24-hour train control centre was relocated from the western wing to the eastern side of the southern part of the building.

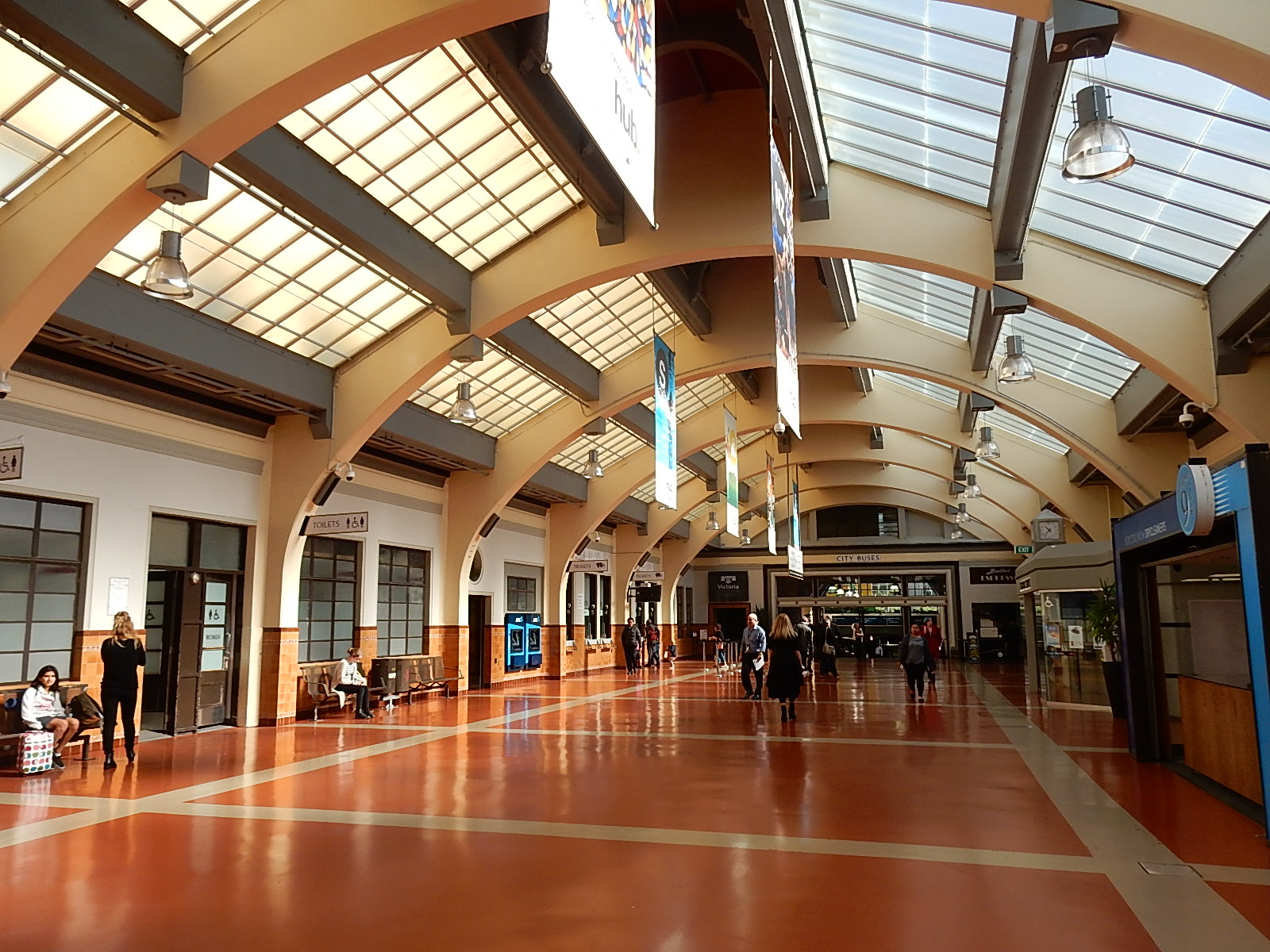
Station concourse in 2016, following a recent upgrade

On 4 December 2006, the New World Railway Metro supermarket opened on the ground floor. This coincided with the closure of the Railway Kiosk and the American Hotdog vendor.

=== Facilities ===
The ground floor has always provided services for long-distance travellers and local passengers including a restaurant, cafes, a bar, a shoe repair shop, and a dry cleaners. The New World Railway Metro supermarket occupied part of the ground floor from 2006 until its closure in March 2024.

In 1988, the Railways-run bookstall and cafeteria were closed with subsequently the barber's shop and men's toilets being converted into Trax Bar and Cafe, while the women's waiting rooms were converted into toilet blocks. The original dining hall and kitchen were converted to office space. At about this time platforms 2 to 7 were shortened at the concourse end to provide increased space for waiting passengers. Large concrete planter boxes were installed at the end of the tracks to assist in stopping runaway trains.

In 2010, the former social hall was converted into 660 square metres of boutique office space.

=== Wellington Regional Stadium ===
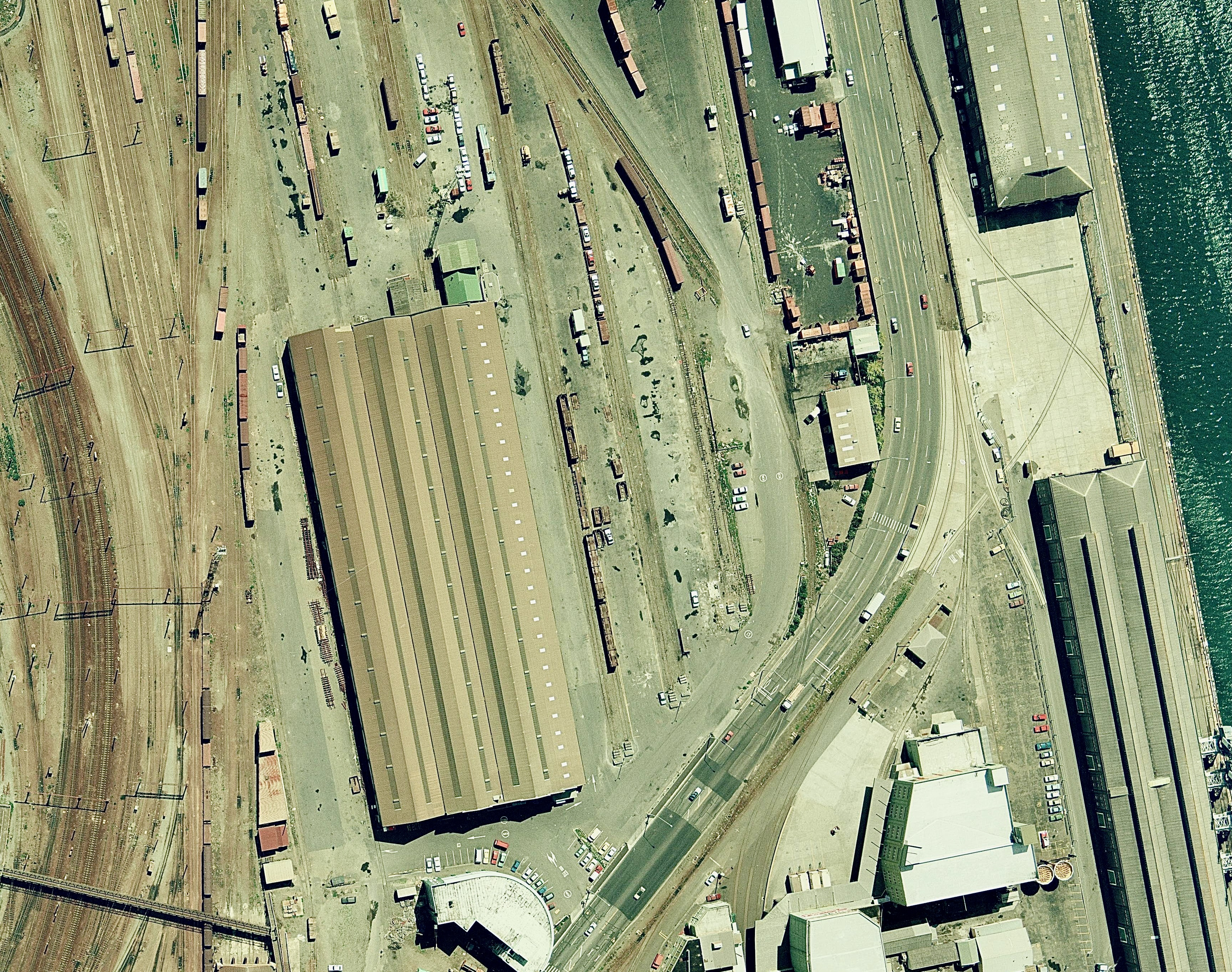
Stadium site in 1988 with goods shed and sidings

As part of the creation of the Wellington Regional Stadium (completed November 1999) on surplus railway land to the north of the station, an elevated walkway from Thorndon Quay to the stadium was installed with access via ramps from platforms 3/4, 5/6 and 7/8. To facilitate this work, the canopies of platforms 7/8 and 9 were shortened to the same length as platforms 3/4 and 5/6.

==== 1931 goods shed ====
Part of the stadium site was formerly occupied by a goods shed, built in 1930, to replace the original NZR and WMR sheds. It had two bays with another bay added in 1942 and a 16 ft (4.9 m) lean-to. The 497 ft (151 m) x 136 ft (41 m) shed was opened on 17 August 1931, with a staff of 143 on the Thorndon reclamation. It was re-roofed in 1966, for £75,000, and fluorescent lighting installed. By December 1988 it was out of use and demolished in 1993. The area was fenced off in 1995, when a siding and amenity buildings in the East Car Yard (formerly Roads. 1 to 11½) and Foreman of Works sidings were also removed.

=== World War I Roll of Honour ===
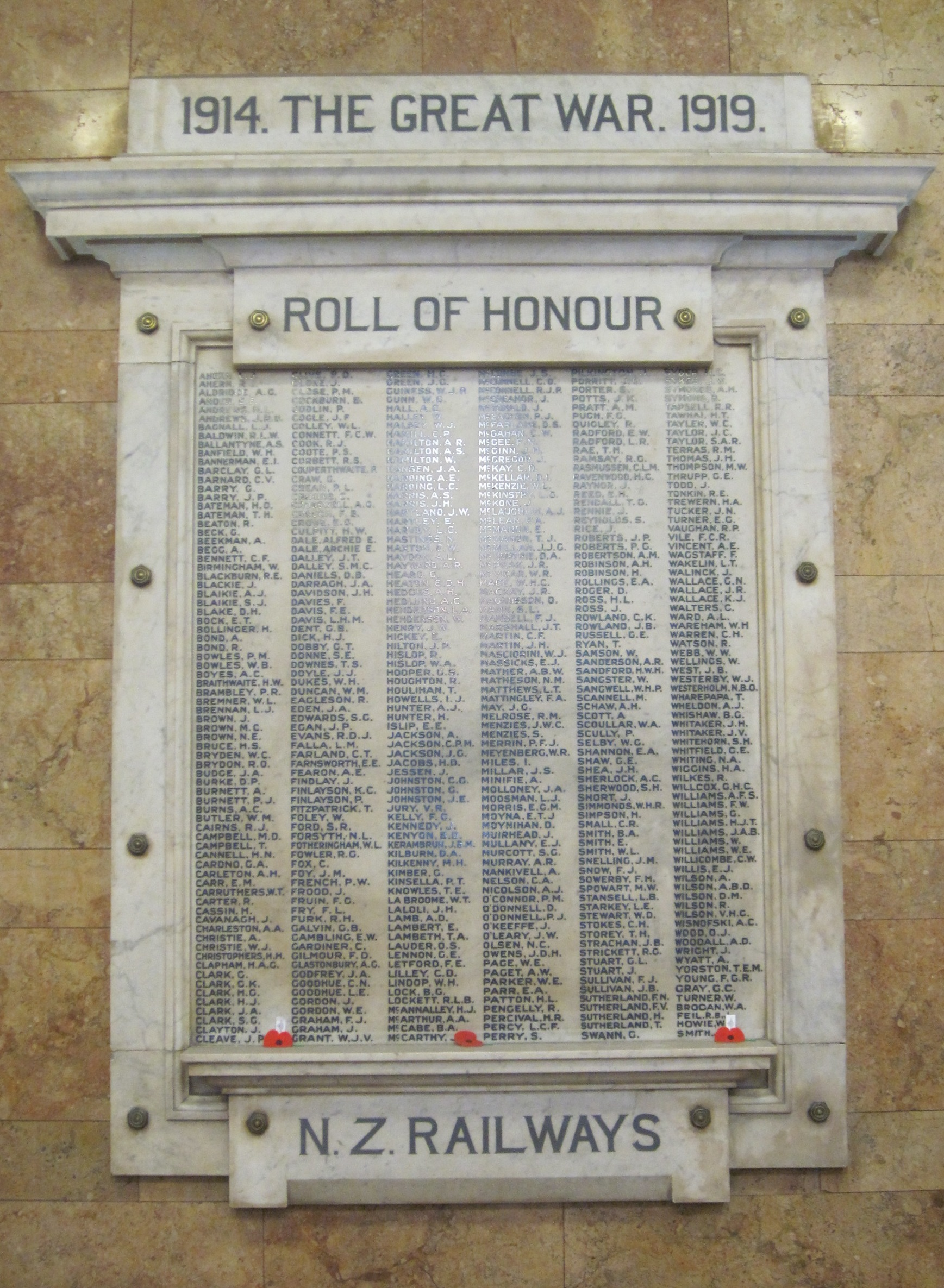
Railways Department roll of honour board

In the office entrance to the station, a roll of honour lists 450 members of the New Zealand Railways Department who lost their lives in World War I. (Transcript of the names with links to their records on the Auckland War Memorial Museum's Cenotaph database.) As many as 5,000 of the department's permanent staff, out of a 1914 workforce of 14,000, enlisted during the war, and many casual workers also served.

The roll was unveiled by Prime Minister William Massey in the Railways Department's head office in Featherston St on 30 April 1922. It originally listed 446 names, including two out of alphabetical order at the end, presumably late additions. Four names were added later, including those of three men who died after the war.

When the station opened in 1937, the memorial was moved along the road to its present location.

=== Heritage listing ===
The station was registered on 25 September 1986 as a Category I Historic Place. Category I historic places are "places of special or outstanding historical or cultural significance" according to Heritage New Zealand. The Rail Heritage Trust of New Zealand classified the station as "Category A" heritage building.

=== Filming location ===
Wellington railway station featured prominently in the 1981 film Goodbye Pork Pie, in which the protagonists drive a Mini through the station concourse in order to escape pursuing police officers.

The station was used in a 2009 TV advert in the United Kingdom for train ticketing company TheTrainLine, where a large flock of sheep use the facilities.

In May 2014, the station foyer was used by celebrity chef Nigella Lawson to film a commercial for Whittaker's a local chocolate manufacturing firm.

=== Airspace development ===
In 1972, NZR proposed developing the airspace above the station's platforms. The proposed development included four buildings built north of the current station over the platforms and part of the marshalling yards. The development would include a 200-bed hotel, tavern, car-parking, shopping facilities and a revolving restaurant. NZR made an application to Wellington City Council for consent to begin the project in 1977. The plan was revised in 1986 in a joint venture between Mainzeal and the Railways Corporation under the "Gateway Development." The development included seven tower blocks, a hotel, retail and recreational facilities.

In 2017 the plans were unveiled for a $1 billion redevelopment of Wellington railway station and the concourse to the stadium, named "Project Kupe" and incorporating a tower, retail outlets, apartments and 12,000 seat indoor stadium.

=== Proposed sale ===
In August 2018, the proposed sale of the building by KiwiRail was stopped by Winston Peters as the Minister of State-Owned Enterprises as "premature". The building required earthquake strengthening (cost $62 million), and the anticipated sale price of $80 million had already been included in KiwiRail's budget. The Port Nicholson Block Settlement Trust decided not to purchase the building in 2016.

== Wellington railway yard ==
The Wellington railway yard incorporates marshalling and storage tracks and buildings and a Multiple Unit Depot (MUD) for servicing EMUs. A rail line under the overhead stadium walkway goes to the container terminal and other freight facilities on the Port wharves, with a level crossing on Aotea Quay.

The principal Wellington signal box known as the "A Box" is near the overhead stadium walkway with a commanding view of the station platforms and main lines entering the station. In 2021/2022 additional crossovers and connections to the station approaches will provide extra capacity and resilience ($4.5 million) and the signal interlocking may be replaced with a computer based system ($8 million). A second lead track is to be provided to the train storage yards to facilitate faster platform clearance (2020; $5.9 million).

When a derailed goods wagon near the Interisland terminal damaged both tracks through the yard out of Wellington on 3 July 2019 commuter service to the Hutt Valley and Kapiti lines were seriously disrupted for two days. The closed Kaiwharawhara railway station is to be developed as an emergency Wellington terminal.

== Services ==
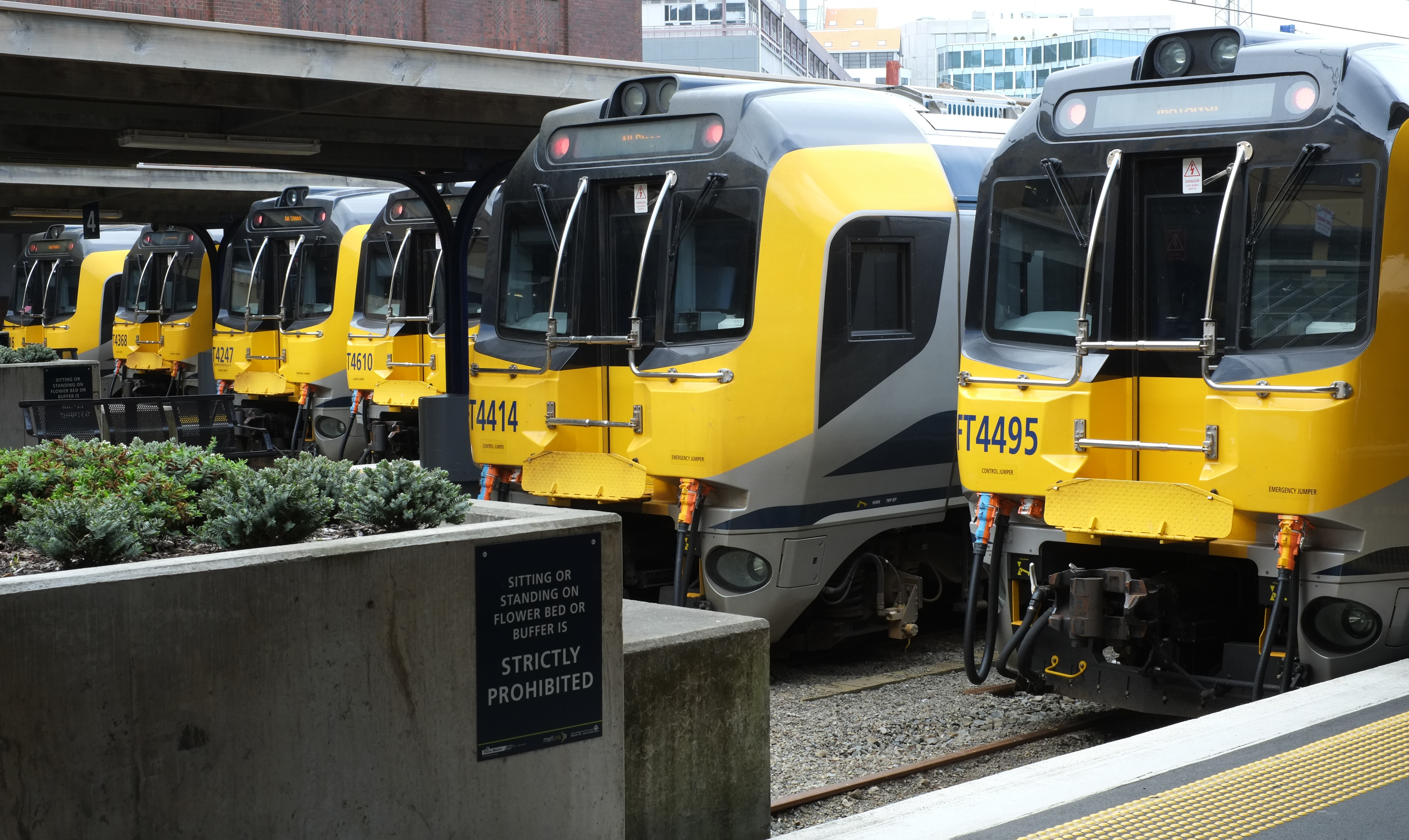
"Matangi" trains at Wellington railway station in 2013

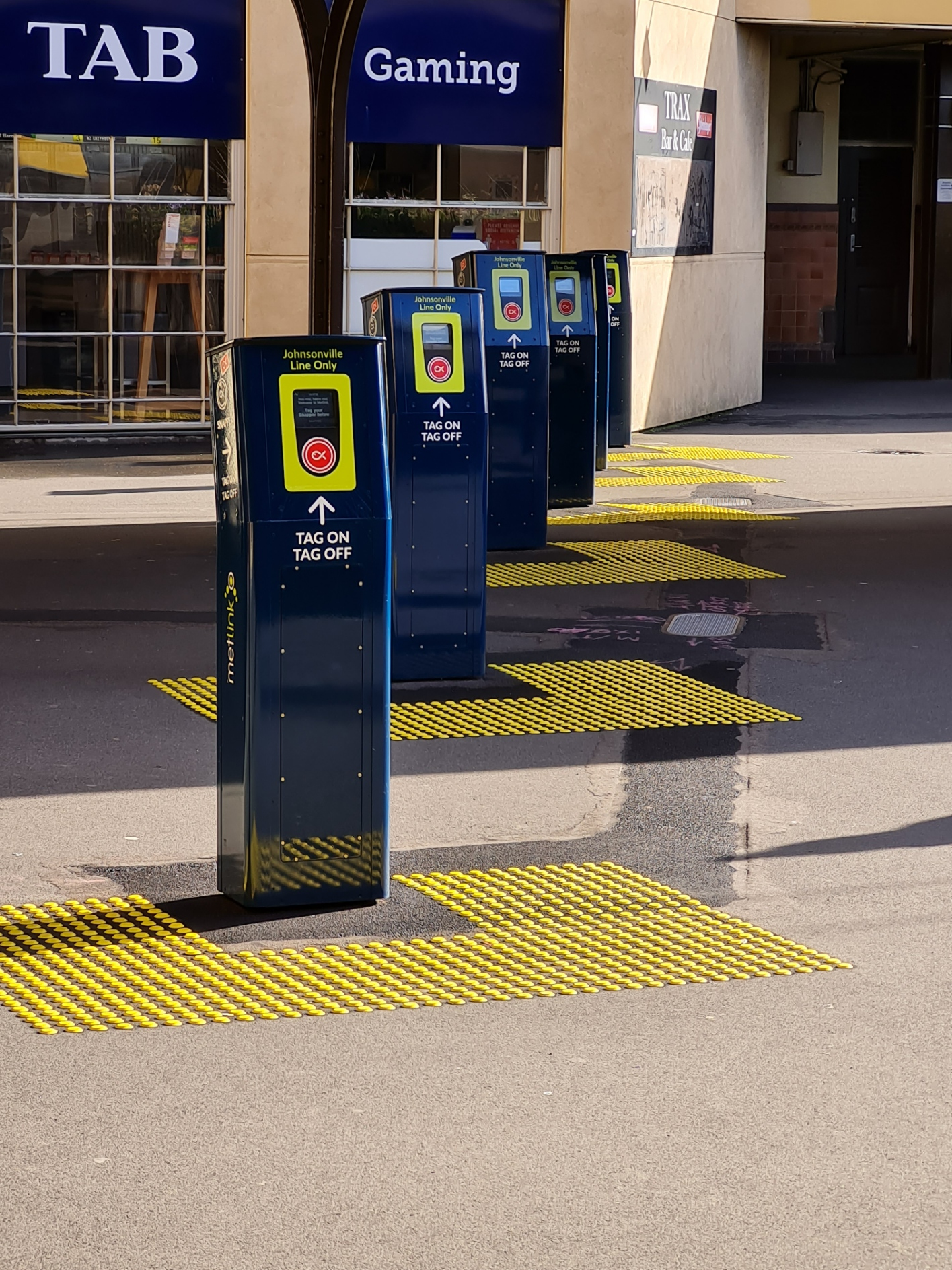
Snapper card scanners at Wellington railway station, 2022

The station copes with large daily passenger numbers with very little alteration having proved necessary. In its first year, 7,600 passengers made 15,200 trips on 140 trains daily. In 1937 there were 140 trains each weekday and 340 in 1957. In the 1960s it was estimated that over 42,000 people used the station each day. Today, 29,000 passengers make 44,000 trips on 390 trains, excluding long-distance services.

Work from 2019 as part of the Wellington Metro upgrade improved the station approaches, and new foundations were built for 80 masts for the traction overhead as steel masts are to replace wooden masts.

=== Rail ===
Two companies operate train services from Wellington.

Transdev operates the Wellington suburban rail network on behalf of the Greater Wellington Regional Council. This includes the electrified lines serving the Wellington and Kapiti urban areas, plus the Wairarapa Connection service to Masterton via the Hutt Valley and the Remutaka Tunnel. At off-peak, 8–10 trains per hour (tph) leave Wellington, broken down they are:

- 2 tph Johnsonville Line services to Johnsonville
- 3 tph Kāpiti Line services to Waikanae (2tph on weekends)
- 3 tph Hutt Valley Line services to Upper Hutt (2tph on weekends)
- 1 tph Melling Line to Melling (weekdays only)
- 5 Wairarapa Connection services per day to Masterton (2 per day at weekends)

The Great Journeys of New Zealand (KiwiRail) operates one long-distance service from Wellington up the North Island Main Trunk, the Northern Explorer to Auckland Strand. The service ran three times per week until December 2021, and is due to resume in September 2022. The Capital Connection service operates to Palmerston North once daily on weekdays.

=== Bus ===
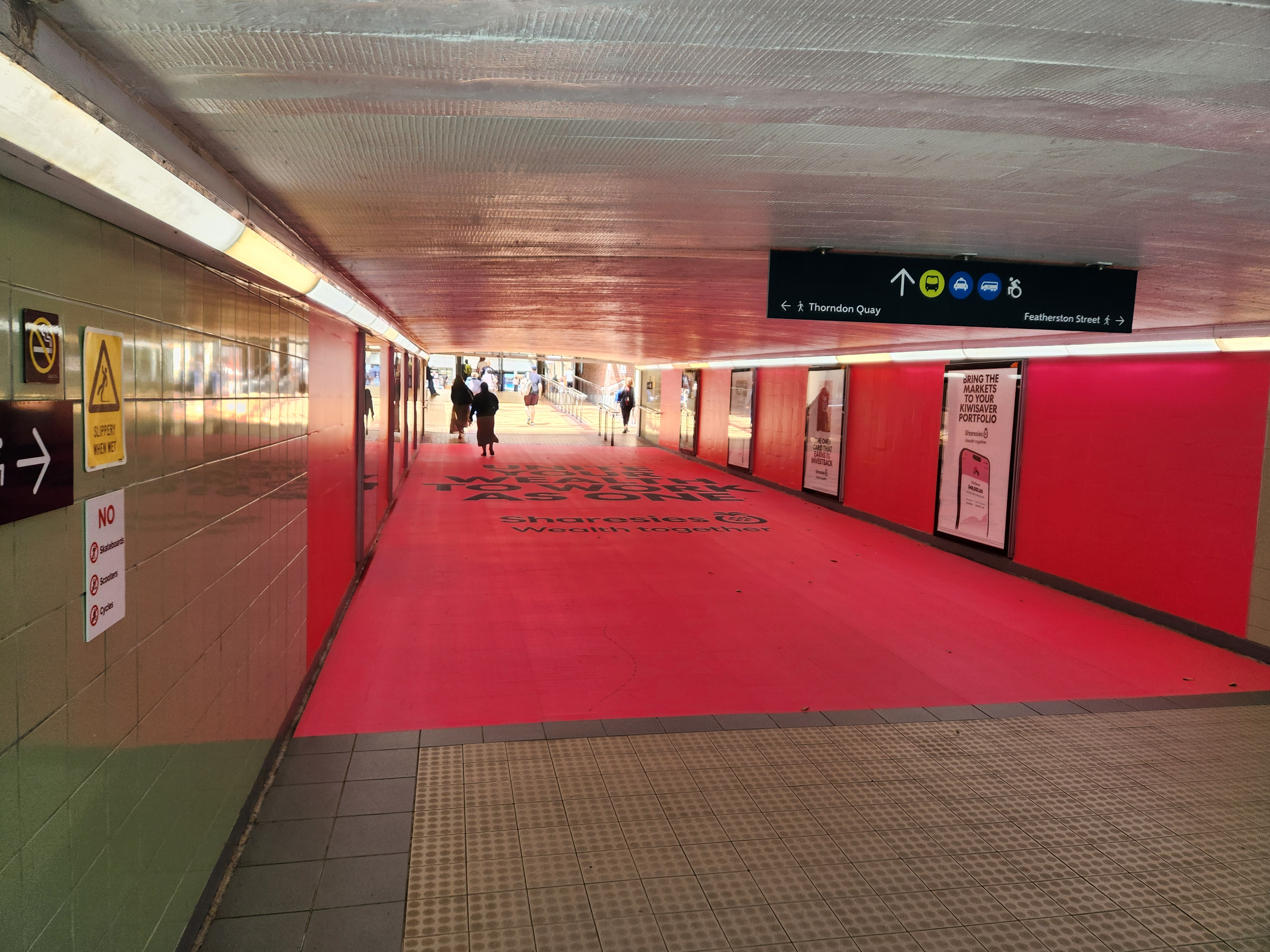
The subway under Featherston Street in 2026

The bus terminal, formerly Lambton Interchange, is served by most Wellington bus routes and is connected to the station by a subway under Featherston St. It is served by the following bus routes: AX, HX,1, 3, 7, 14, 17, 20, 22, 23, 24, 25, 26, 27, 29, 30x, 31x, 32x, 35, 36, 38x, 39, 52, 56, 57, 58, 60e, 83, 81 and 84

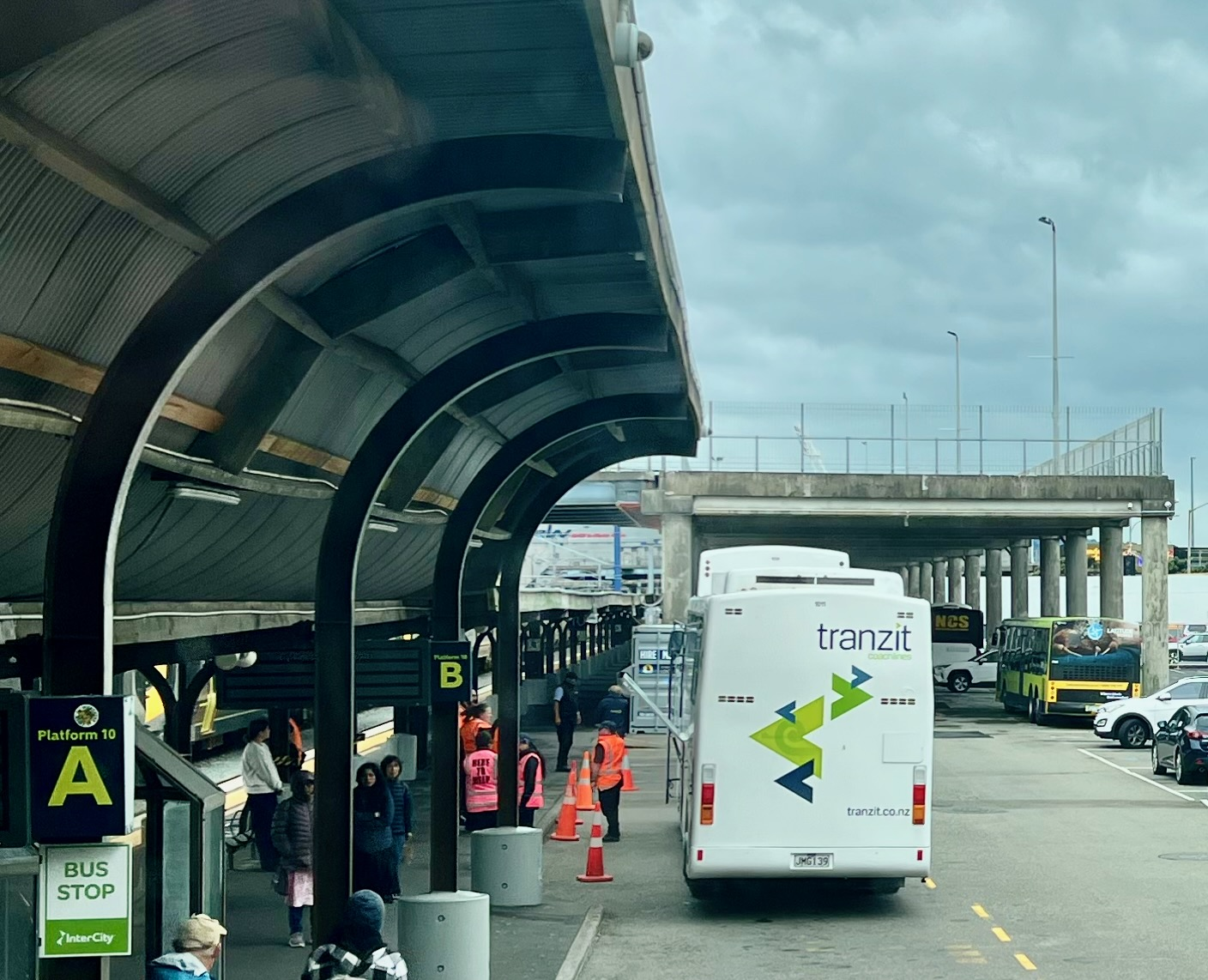
Platform 10

A small roadway opposite Platform 9, known as platform 10, is also served by train replacement buses, Interislander shuttle buses, and InterCity and Newmans long-distance coaches.

== See also ==
- Rail transport in New Zealand
- Public transport in the Wellington Region
