= HD 190647 =

Star in the constellation Sagittarius

Observation data Epoch J2000 Equinox ICRS
- Constellation: Sagittarius
- Right ascension: 20^{h} 07^{m} 19.6698^{s}
- Declination: −35° 32′ 19.079″
- Apparent magnitude (V): 7.78

Characteristics
- Spectral type: G5V
- B−V color index: 0.743±0.002
- Variable type: Constant

Astrometry
Radial velocity (R_{v})	−40.33±0.12 km/s
Proper motion (μ)	RA: −26.622±0.079 mas/yr Dec.: −206.859±0.053 mas/yr
Parallax (π)	18.3287±0.0495 mas
Distance	177.9 ± 0.5 ly (54.6 ± 0.1 pc)
Absolute magnitude (M_{V})	4.00

Details
Mass	1.07±0.01 M_{☉}
Radius	1.56±0.03 R_{☉}
Luminosity	2.19±0.01 L_{☉}
Surface gravity (log g)	4.07±0.02 cgs
Temperature	5,630+48 −40 K
Metallicity [Fe/H]	0.23 dex
Rotational velocity (v sin i)	1.576 km/s
Age	8.7±0.4 Gyr

Other designations
- CD−35°13924, HD 190647, HIP 99115, SAO 211821, LTT 7948, NLTT 48727, TYC 7449-1245-1, 2MASS J20071966-3532189

Database references
SIMBAD	data

HD 190647 is a yellow-hued star with an exoplanetary companion, located in the southern constellation of Sagittarius. It has an apparent visual magnitude of 7.78, making this an 8th magnitude star that is much too faint to be readily visible to the naked eye. The star is located at a distance of 178 light years from the Sun based on parallax measurements, but is drifting closer with a radial velocity of −40 km/s. It is also called HIP 99115.

The stellar classification of this star is G5V, matching a G-type main-sequence star. However, the low gravity and high luminosity of this star may indicate it is slightly evolved. It is chrompsherically inactive with a slow rotation, having a projected rotational velocity of 1.6 km/s. The star's metallicity is high, with nearly 1.5 times the abundance of iron compared to the Sun.

In 2007, a Jovian planet was found to be orbiting the star. It was detected using the radial velocity method with the HARPS spectrograph in Chile. The object is orbiting at a distance of 2.0 AU from the host star with a period of 2.84 years and an eccentricity (ovalness) of 0.18. As the inclination of the orbital plane is unknown, only a lower bound on the planetary mass can be made. It has a minimum mass 1.9 times the mass of Jupiter.

The HD 190647 planetary system
Companion (in order from star)	Mass	Semimajor axis (AU)	Orbital period (days)	Eccentricity	Inclination (°)	Radius
b	>1.9 ± 0.06 M_{J}	2.07 ± 0.06	1038.1 ± 4.9	0.18 ± 0.02	—	—

== See also ==
- HD 100777
- HD 221287
- List of extrasolar planets
