= HD 100777 b =

Exoplanet in the constellation of Leo

HD 100777 b / Laligurans
Discovery
- Discovered by: Dominique Naef et al.
- Discovery site: Chile
- Discovery date: March 5, 2007
- Detection method: Doppler spectroscopy (HARPS)

Orbital characteristics
- Apastron: 1.40 AU (209 million km)
- Periastron: 0.659 AU (98.6 million km)
- Semi-major axis: 1.03 ± 0.03 AU (154.1 ± 4.5 million km)
- Eccentricity: 0.36 ± 0.02
- Orbital period (sidereal): 383.7 ± 1.2 d 1.050 y
- Average orbital speed: 29.3
- Time of periastron: 2,453,456.2 ± 2.3
- Argument of periastron: 202.7 ± 3.0
- Semi-amplitude: 34.9 ± 0.8
- Star: HD 100777

Physical characteristics
- Mass: >1.17 ± 0.02 M_{J}

HD 100777 b, formally named Laligurans, is an extrasolar planet located approximately 172 light-years away in the constellation of Leo, orbiting the star HD 100777. It has a minimum mass about 1.17 times greater than Jupiter and takes about 384 days to orbit its star. It has a semi-major axis of 1.03 AU and a moderately eccentric orbit around its star. The velocity of the orbit is 29.3 km/s. Dominique Naef discovered this planet in March 2007 by using HARPS spectrograph located in Chile.

== See also ==
- HD 190647 b
- HD 221287 b
