= HD 221287 =

Star in the constellation Tucana

HD 221287 / Poerava
Observation data Epoch J2000 Equinox ICRS
- Constellation: Tucana
- Right ascension: 23^{h} 31^{m} 20.33846^{s}
- Declination: −58° 12′ 35.0336″
- Apparent magnitude (V): 7.82

Characteristics
- Evolutionary stage: main sequence
- Spectral type: F7V
- B−V color index: 0.513±0.008

Astrometry
Radial velocity (R_{v})	−21.91±0.13 km/s
Proper motion (μ)	RA: +181.041±0.018 mas/yr Dec.: −5.234±0.021 mas/yr
Parallax (π)	17.8725±0.0206 mas
Distance	182.5 ± 0.2 ly (55.95 ± 0.06 pc)
Absolute magnitude (M_{V})	4.11

Details
Mass	1.209+0.034 −0.038 M_{☉}
Radius	1.183+0.020 −0.019 R_{☉}
Luminosity	2.024±0.016 L_{☉}
Surface gravity (log g)	4.374±0.013 cgs
Temperature	6,431±16 K
Metallicity [Fe/H]	+0.13±0.149 dex
Rotation	5±2
Rotational velocity (v sin i)	2.9±0.2 km/s
Age	763+613 −474 or 1,300 Myr

Other designations
- Poerava, CD−58°8579, HD 221287, HIP 116084, SAO 247912, TYC 8838-463-1, 2MASS J23312032-5812350

Database references
SIMBAD	data

HD 221287, named Poerava, is a star in the southern constellation of Tucana. It has a yellow-white hue but is too faint to be viewed with the naked eye, having an apparent visual magnitude of 7.82. This object is located at a distance of 182 light years from the Sun, as determined from its parallax. It is drifting closer with a radial velocity of −22 km/s.

== Description ==
HD 221287 is an F-type main-sequence star with a stellar classification of F7V. It is relatively young with age estimates of 763 million and 1.3 billion years, and possesses an active chromosphere. Cool spots on the surface are generating a radial-velocity signal that is modulated by the rotation period of around five days. The star is 18% larger and 20% more massive than the Sun. It is radiating twice the luminosity of the Sun from its photosphere at an effective temperature of 6,440 K.

== Name ==
The star was given the designation "HD 221287" before being named Poerava by representatives of the Cook Islands in the IAU's 2019 NameExoWorlds contest, with the comment "Poerava is the word in the Cook Islands Maori language for a large mystical black pearl of utter beauty and perfection."

== Planetary system ==
On March 5, 2007, the astronomer Dominique Naef used the HARPS spectrograph to uncover the exoplanetary companion designated HD 221287 b (among others). Using the amplitude from observations with HARPS, he calculated a minimum mass of 3.12 times that of Jupiter, making this a superjovian. This planet orbits 25% farther from the star than Earth is from the Sun, with a low eccentricity. In 2024, astrometric measurements revealed that this object might be instead a brown dwarf, with a mass between 10 and 20 M_{J} at 68% confidence, or between 3 and 40 M_{J} at 99.5% confidence.

Stability analysis reveals that the orbits of Earth–sized planets in HD 221287 b's Trojan points, located 60 degrees ahead and behind the planet in its orbit, would be stable for long periods of time.

The HD 221287 planetary system
Companion (in order from star)	Mass	Semimajor axis (AU)	Orbital period (days)	Eccentricity	Inclination (°)	Radius
b / Pipitea	3–40 M_{J}	1.25±0.04	456.1±6.5	0.08±0.11	—	—

== See also ==
- HD 100777
- HD 164595
- HD 190647
