= HD 100777 =

Star in the constellation Leo

HD 100777 / Sagarmatha
Observation data Epoch J2000 Equinox ICRS
- Constellation: Leo
- Right ascension: 11^{h} 35^{m} 51.52322^{s}
- Declination: −04° 45′ 20.5046″
- Apparent magnitude (V): 8.42

Characteristics
- Spectral type: G8V
- B−V color index: 0.76±0.02

Astrometry
Radial velocity (R_{v})	1.10±0.14 km/s
Proper motion (μ)	RA: −11.535 mas/yr Dec.: 35.586 mas/yr
Parallax (π)	20.1590±0.0285 mas
Distance	161.8 ± 0.2 ly (49.61 ± 0.07 pc)
Absolute magnitude (M_{V})	4.95

Details
Mass	1.032+0.042 −0.045 M_{☉}
Radius	1.033+0.021 −0.018 R_{☉}
Luminosity	0.946+0.003 −0.004 L_{☉}
Surface gravity (log g)	4.402±0.265 cgs
Temperature	5,611±42 K
Metallicity [Fe/H]	0.330±0.096 dex
Rotational velocity (v sin i)	1.676±0.230 km/s
Age	4.78+2.20 −2.14 Gyr

Other designations
- Sagarmatha, BD–03°3147, HD 100777, HIP 56572, SAO 138288, TYC 4933-678-1, 2MASS J11355152-0445204

Database references
SIMBAD	data
Exoplanet Archive	data

HD 100777 is a single star with a planetary companion in the equatorial constellation of Leo. With an apparent visual magnitude of 8.42 it is too faint to be viewed with the naked eye, although the absolute magnitude of 4.81 indicates it could be seen if it were just 33 ly (10 pc) away. The distance to the star is approximately 162 light-years based on parallax measurements.

The International Astronomical Union held the NameExoWorlds campaign in 2019. Nepal named the star Sagarmatha, the Nepali name of Mount Everest, and the exoplanet revolving it was named as Laligurans, the Nepali name of the flower Rhododendron.

This is an ordinary G-type main-sequence star with a stellar classification of G8V. It has a similar mass, size, and luminosity to the Sun. The star is roughly five billion years old with an inactive chromosphere and is spinning with a projected rotational velocity of 1.7 km/s. A 2015 survey ruled out the existence of any additional stellar companions at projected distances from 18 to 369 astronomical units.

== Planetary system ==
In 2007, a giant exoplanet companion was found using the radial velocity method. It is orbiting HD 100777 at a distance of 1.03 AU with a period of 384 days and an eccentricity (ovalness) of 0.36. The inclination of the orbital plane of this body is unknown, so only a lower limit on the mass can be determined. It has at least 1.16 times the mass of Jupiter.

The HD 100777 planetary system
Companion (in order from star)	Mass	Semimajor axis (AU)	Orbital period (days)	Eccentricity	Inclination (°)	Radius
b / Laligurans	>1.16 ± 0.03 M_{J}	1.03 ± 0.03	383.7 ± 1.2	0.36 ± 0.02	—	—

== See also ==
- HD 190647
- HD 221287
- List of extrasolar planets
- List of stars in Leo
