= HD 190647 b =

Exoplanet orbiting the star HD 190647

Discovery
- Discovered by: Dominique Naef et al.
- Discovery site: Chile
- Discovery date: March 5, 2007
- Detection method: HARPS

Orbital characteristics
- Apastron: 2.44 AU (365,000,000 km)
- Periastron: 1.70 AU (254,000,000 km)
- Semi-major axis: 2.07 ± 0.06 AU (309,700,000 ± 9,000,000 km)
- Eccentricity: 0.18 ± 0.02
- Orbital period (sidereal): 1038.1 ± 5.1 d 2.8421 y
- Average orbital speed: 21.8
- Time of periastron: 2,453,868 ± 25
- Argument of periastron: 232.5 ± 9.6
- Semi-amplitude: 36.4 ± 1.2
- Star: HD 190647

Physical characteristics
- Mass: >1.9 M_{J}

HD 190647 b is >1.9 M_{J} planet orbiting the star HD 190647 at 309.7 gigameters or 10.04 μpc away from the star, taking 89.69 megaseconds to orbit the star with average velocity of 21.8 km/s. The orbital eccentricity is 18%. Dominique Naef discovered this planet in early 2007 by using HARPS spectrograph located in Chile.

== See also ==
- HD 100777 b
- Pipitea (planet)
