= HD 221287 b =

Exoplanet in the constellation Tucana

HD 221287 b / Pipitea
Discovery
- Discovered by: Dominique Naef et al.
- Discovery site: Chile
- Discovery date: March 5, 2007
- Detection method: HARPS

Orbital characteristics
- Apastron: 1.35 AU (202,000,000 km)
- Periastron: 1.15 AU (172,000,000 km)
- Semi-major axis: 1.25 ± 0.04 AU (187,000,000 ± 6,000,000 km)
- Eccentricity: 0.08 ± 0.11
- Orbital period (sidereal): 456.1 ± 6.5 d 1.2487 y
- Time of periastron: 2,453,263 ± 100
- Argument of periastron: 98 ± 72
- Semi-amplitude: 71 ± 13
- Star: HD 221287

Physical characteristics
- Mass: >3.12 ± 0.78 M_{J} (992 M_{🜨})

HD 221287 b, also known as Pipitea, is an exoplanet that orbits HD 221287, approximately 173 light years away in the constellation of Tucana. This planet has mass >3.12 M_{J} (>992 M_{🜨}) and orbits in a habitable zone at 1.25 AUs (6.06 μpc) from the star, taking 1.25 years to orbit at 29.9 km/s around the star. Dominique Naef discovered this planet in early 2007 by using HARPS spectrograph located in Chile.

Based on a probable 10^{−4} fraction of the planet mass as a satellite, the planet can have a Mars-sized moon with habitable surface. On the other hand, this mass can be distributed into many small satellites as well.

It was named "Pipitea" by representatives of the Cook Islands in the IAU's 2019 NameExoWorlds contest, with the comment "Pipitea is a small, white and gold pearl found in Penrhyn lagoon in the northern group of the Cook Islands."

== Insolation data for HD 221287 b ==
From Luminosity and distance irridance can be calculated: (Note: From $\begin{smallmatrix}L=4 \pi R^2 \sigma T_{\rm eff}^4 \end{smallmatrix}$, where $\begin{smallmatrix}L \end{smallmatrix}$ is the luminosity, $\begin{smallmatrix}R \end{smallmatrix}$ is the radius, $\begin{smallmatrix}T_{\rm eff}\end{smallmatrix}$ is the effective surface temperature and $\begin{smallmatrix}\sigma \end{smallmatrix}$ is the Stefan–Boltzmann constant.)

Planet Distance	Insolation (W/m^{2})	% of Earth's
Earth's Aphelion Flux	1321.544	96.74%
HD 221287 b Apastron flux	1,351.050	98.90%
Earth's Average Flux (Note: Earth's Solar Constant.)	1366.079	100.00%
Earth's Perihelion Flux	1412.903	103.43%
HD 221287 b Average flux (Note: $f_p= \frac{ (1.80245\times 3.0572\times 10^{25})} { ( ( 1.25 - ( 1.25 \times 0.08 ) ) \times 149597870700 )^2 }$)	1,575.865	115.36%
HD 221287 b Periastron flux	1,861.844	136.29%
Venus' Aphelion Flux	2585.411	188.72%
Venus' Average Flux	2620.693	191.30%
Venus' Perihelion Flux	2656.70	193.93%

== See also ==
- HD 100777 b
- HD 190647 b
