= Pipitea Point railway station =

Former railway station in New Zealand

Pipitea Point

General information
- Location: Wellington
- Coordinates: 41°16′29.4″S 174°47′01.8″E
- System: New Zealand Government Railways (NZGR)
- Owner: New Zealand Railways Department
- Line: Hutt Valley Line
- Tracks: Main line (1)

History
- Opened: 14 April 1874
- Closed: as a stop 30 September 1884 following re-alignment of track
- Rebuilt: building burnt January 1878 and not rebuilt
Location

Pipitea Point railway station, a temporary building for the Hutt and Masterton railway, was Wellington's first railway station opened on 14 April 1874 with the Hutt Valley Line. The railway line from Wellington to Lower Hutt was started in 1872 and opened in 1874.

== Temporary Wellington railway station Pipitea Point ==
Pipitea Point railway station building was on the earthquake-raised beach off Pipitea Point just south of the junction of the current Davis Street and Thorndon Quay and near the as yet unreclaimed site of the future Thorndon railway station. The site was as close as the line from the Hutt could be laid to Wellington's business district or the commercial and industrial centre of Te Aro.

The Governor 'turned the first sod' of the Masterton railway at Pipitea Point on Monday 19 August 1872. Tenders were called for the station building in November 1873. The published plans were for a small passenger station, about 43 feet by 15 feet, with a 120-foot platform. The station was to be used only until the completion of the Wellington Terminus when it would become a wayside station. There was to be an engine shed for three locomotives and a shed for twelve carriages both suitable for moving to the city terminus when that was completed. The first locomotive was assembled in the engine shed and its steam was raised for the first time on Monday 9 December 1873 when the locomotive was reported to have made "all the proper orthodox noises".

The Hutt railway was opened for traffic on Tuesday 14 April 1874 "without the slightest demonstration of any kind", not even a cheer, from about twenty gentlemen and "a large number of small boys" gathered to see the departure of the first train at 8:15 with 21 passengers including members of the Provincial Council: Mr Rhodes and Mr Cruickshank.

The proposed reclamations were made over the next three years and the lines were extended 47 chains or almost one kilometre (947 metres) to reach Ballance Street before Pipitea station's building was destroyed by fire in January 1878 but Pipitea Point remained a wayside stop. The stop became obsolete on 30 September 1884 when the railway lines were relocated much further to the east on newly reclaimed land.

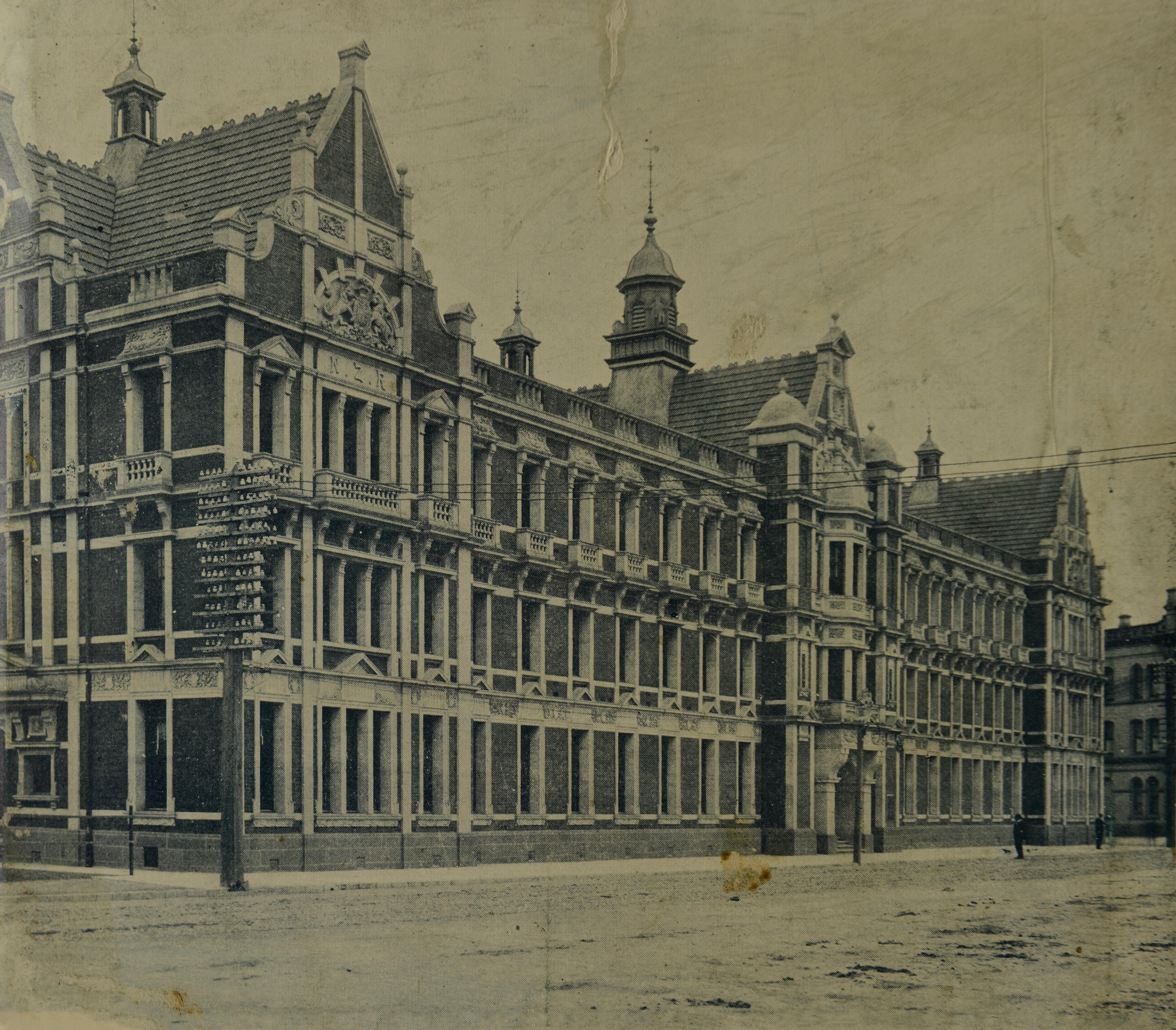
New Zealand Railways headquarters 1905 to 1937

== Wellington railway station 75 Featherston Street ==
A new building named Wellington railway station and a goods station built on reclaimed land (Note: "the Government are building . . . a wooden shanty called the metropolitan railway station but more like a cross between a bungalow and a cowshed." Division in the Camp. The Evening Post, page 2, 18 October 1880.) (Note: It was later claimed by The Evening Post to have been well-known that the Minister for Public works added an express Ministerial note to the plans that the building was to be "of wood and as cheap and plain as possible". A Thing of Sheds and Patches Evening Post, page 2, 24 December 1880. It was not demolished until 1937) opposite the entrance to the new Railway Wharf and fronting Featherston Street between Whitmore and Bunny Streets opened on 1 November 1880. The Wairarapa Line over the Rimutaka Incline was opened right through to Masterton the same day by a train of 21 carriages pulled by Fell engines, Mount Cook and Mont Cenis. The Railway Wharf close by over the new Waterloo Quay had been finished in April 1880.

The site quickly became cramped and access to Railway Wharf was restricted. A new site for the passenger station was expected to be near the northern end of Government Buildings and expected to accommodate the Manawatu as well as the Masterton line. In 1885 the wooden passenger station building was moved on rollers north along Featherston Street to the far side of Bunny Street. The Government and the Wellington and Manawatu Railway Company were unable to agree to share the station and the Manawatu line built what became Thorndon station.

The 75 Featherston Street site was used for the New Zealand Railways headquarters building begun in 1901 and completed in 1905. In 1937 it was vacated and taken over by the Defence Department. In the 21st century the site is occupied by Rydges Hotel.

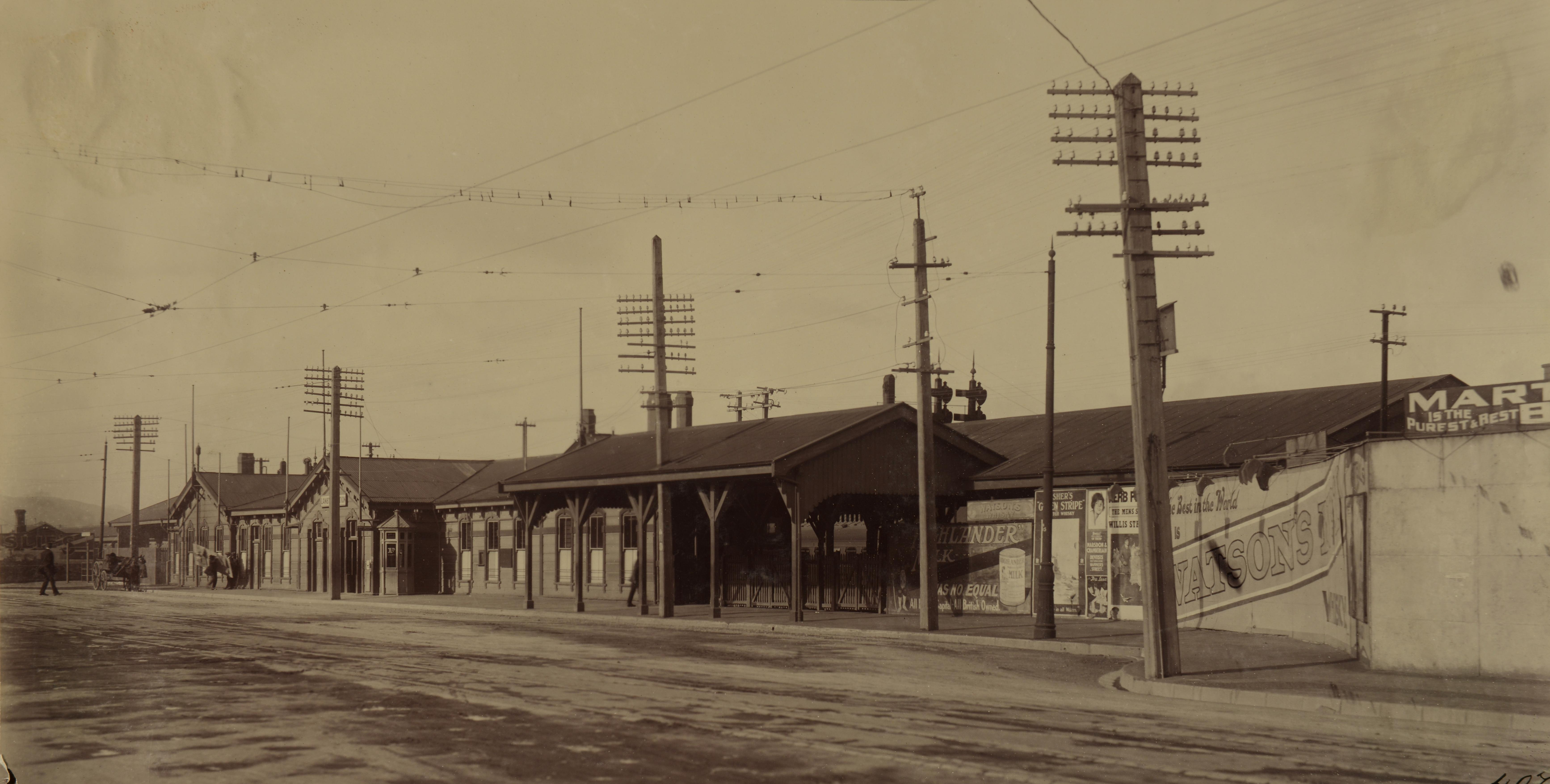
The building rolled from the headquarters site

== Wellington railway station opposite Mulgrave Street ==
The 75 Featherston Street building was taken further north on Featherston Street to the opposite side of Bunny Street. It opened to passengers in 1885. This building's name was changed to Lambton railway station when the Government acquired the Thorndon railway station along with Wellington and Manawatu Railway Company.

== History ==
- 1872, 20 August: First sod for line turned at Pipitea Point by the Governor, Sir George Bowen.
- 1874, 14 April: Line opened with first train to Lower Hutt, though station buildings not yet finished
- 1878, 16 January: Fire in the Railway Hotel. Started at 3.45 pm and fanned by a strong wind, it spreads across the road to the station. In 15 minutes the railway station, manager's office and workshops were alight, and they were all destroyed. The city water supply from the council reservoir had been turned off as the reservoir only had a few feet of water; and the water took 35 minutes to come through the mains.
- 1880, 1 November: New station opened in Featherston Street on site later used for Defence building, though Pipitea Point Station kept as stopping point, and line extended to Masterton
- 1884, 30 September: Pipitea Point Station closed as Hutt line now on eastern side of reclamation after exchange of land with WMR.
- 1885: Wellington Station reopened at intersection of Thorndon Quay and Lambton Quay. The building was shifted from Featherston Street on rollers pulled by a large number of men. This allowed for extension of Bunny Street to the waterfront (Waterloo Quay).
- 1908, 7 December: Government took over Wellington and Manawatu Railway Company (WMR). Stations to be called Wellington (Thorndon Station) and Wellington (Lambton Station), or just Thorndon Station and Lambton Station.
- 1937, 19 June: Lambton Station closed (Thorndon Station closed on 8 June).
