= Lambton railway station =

Defunct railway station in Wellington, New Zealand

Wellington railway station 1885–1908 Lambton railway station 1908–1937
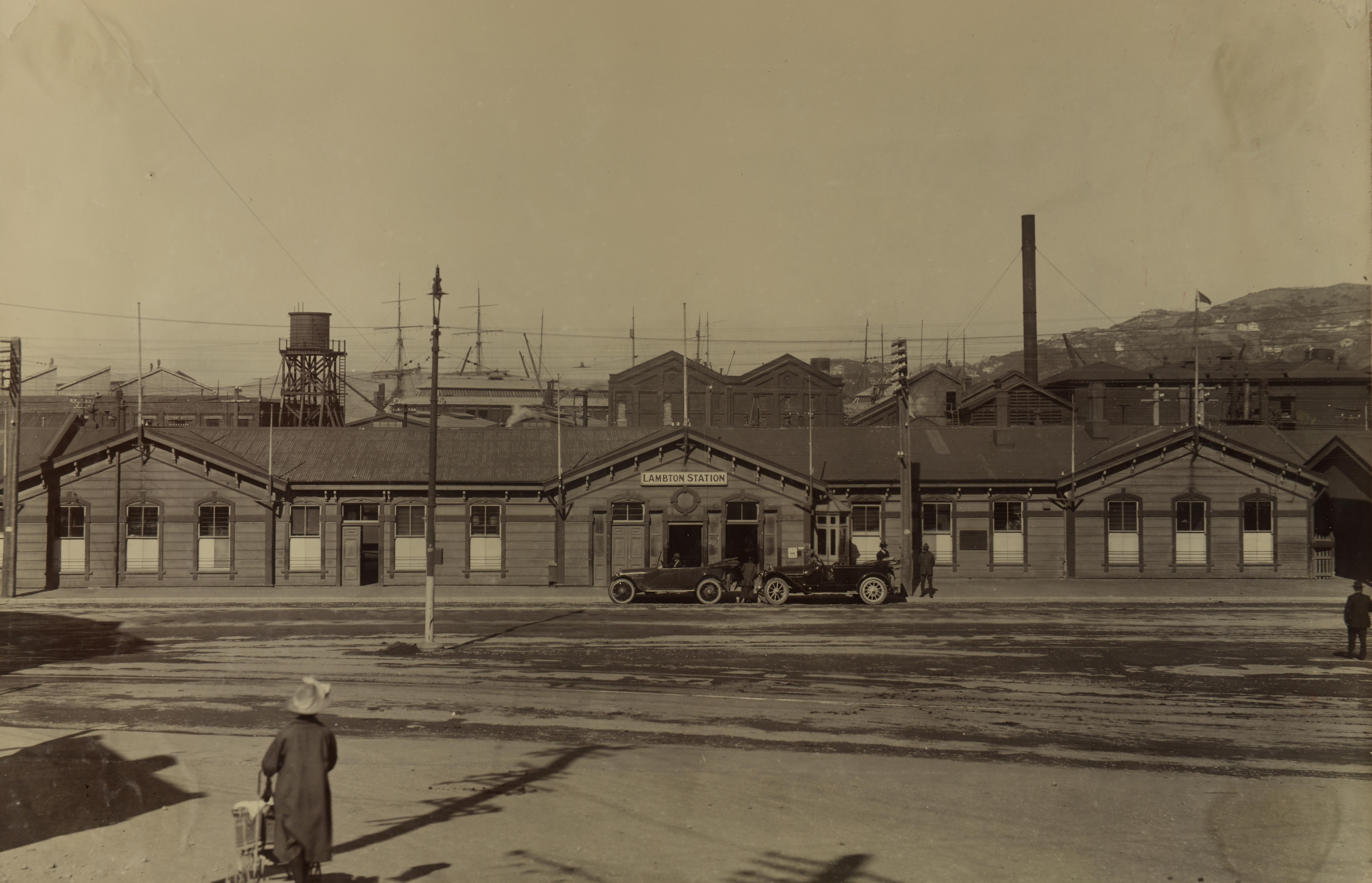
- The station seen from the foot of Mulgrave Street

General information
- Location: Wellington
- Coordinates: 41°16′43.3″S 174°46′48.21″E
- System: New Zealand Government Railways (NZGR)
- Owner: Railways Department
- Lines: Hutt Valley Line, Wairarapa Line and until 1908 the Main Trunk Line
- Platforms: Island
- Tracks: Main line (1)

History
- Opened: 1885 for passengers
- Closed: 18 / 19 July 1936
- Rebuilt: new building opened
Location

Lambton railway station in Featherston Street, Wellington, New Zealand, was the southern passenger terminus for the Hutt Valley Line and the Wairarapa Line from 1885 to 1936 and for lines further north until December 1908. It was originally known as Wellington railway station. Wellington's third railway station, it had been preceded by station buildings temporarily at Pipitea Point and a site further south on Featherston Street beside Wellington's rail freight depot and its Railway Wharf.

The New Zealand Railways Department operated Lambton station, while the private Wellington and Manawatu Railway Company's city terminus was the nearby Thorndon railway station. The latter was built hastily in the spring of 1885 after the company and the government failed to agree to share Lambton station.

Lambton station's platform closed in July 1936. Wairarapa and Hutt passengers continued to use the building's facilities and its temporary access to the new platforms until the unfinished Bunny Street building opened. The ticket office stayed open until 11:15pm on 19 June 1937, which was Bunny Street's official opening day, then this building was demolished.

== Extension of the Hutt and Wairarapa lines towards the city ==
The 1855 earthquake raised dry land along the side of Wellington Harbour from the north end of Thorndon to Petone. Railway lines were laid there in the 1870s and on the beach in front of Thorndon Quay towards Wellington as far as Pipitea Point which was as close as the lines could get to the city. Pipitea Point was the first Wellington railway station. Wellington's Hutt Line opened in 1874. The Manawatu station or Thorndon railway station was opened nearby just to the north of Pipitea Point but not until the spring of 1885.

Reclamation continued during the 1870s and the line was extended to Wellington's business area terminating at Ballance Street beyond the new Government Buildings completed in 1876.

The Hutt Road was only 24 feet or just over 7 metres wide. Wellington and Manawatu Railway Company had made a new reclamation for their own line and an arrangement was made between NZR and WMR for an exchange of land so that NZR lines were moved and ran nearest the harbour. The Hutt Road could then be brought to the full chain or 66 feet or 20 metres. As a consequence the Government lines were moved from beside Thorndon Quay and re-aligned to run near Thorndon Esplanade now Aotea Quay and the Pipitea Point stop was eliminated. At the same time it was revealed that to ease congestion around the Railway Wharf Wellington Railway Station would move north along Featherston Street to a location opposite the junction of Mulgrave Street and Sydney Street – now Kate Sheppard Place.

The line was further extended in 1893 to the Te Aro industrial and commercial area terminating at Te Aro railway station but that extension closed in 1917.

== 75 Featherston Street ==
The second Wellington railway station was built just before Ballance Street on a site fronting Featherston Street between Whitmore and Bunny Streets. It was opened on 1 November 1880.

The Wairarapa Line over the Rimutaka Incline was opened right through to Masterton the same day.

Railway Wharf, with three separate lines on the wharf, was finished in April 1880. A revised layout of the adjoining yard was announced

=== Passenger terminal ===
Plans were issued and tenders for construction called in March 1880. The front was to face Waterloo Quay (a few weeks later this was changed to Featherston Street). The Evening Post described it as "a plain and unpretending" building, of one storey, 150 feet long, 20 feet high and 16 feet wide (or 45 metres long, 6 metres high and 5 metres wide). The main platform was to be of asphalt and extend 400 feet (120 metres) to the rear of the station covered by an overhanging verandah. A second platform for arrivals would have no cover. The materials were principally tōtara and kauri. "The result will not be an imposing addition to the architectural features of Wellington" said the Evening Post. The station cost £2,294.

A letter to The Evening Post noted that though Municipal building regulations were not binding on the Crown in England the Crown always observes them. The Government chose to ignore the city's by-law prohibiting building in combustible materials in that locality.

Once it was built it was clear the new passenger station restricted access to the Railway Wharf. A much greater than expected increase in wharf traffic forced its removal. In January 1884 it was proposed to move the building a few chains further north. Accommodating the Manawatu line was also mentioned.

=== Removal ===
A temporary platform and booking office was put up fifteen chains or 300 metres north of the present station at the bottom of Sydney Street now Kate Sheppard Place. It was to be ready to open after Sunday 15 February 1885.

The building was slid on skids propelled by powerful screwjacks and arrived at its new site near Mulgrave Street on the evening of Friday 20 February 1885. Crowds of people watched the big operation each day.

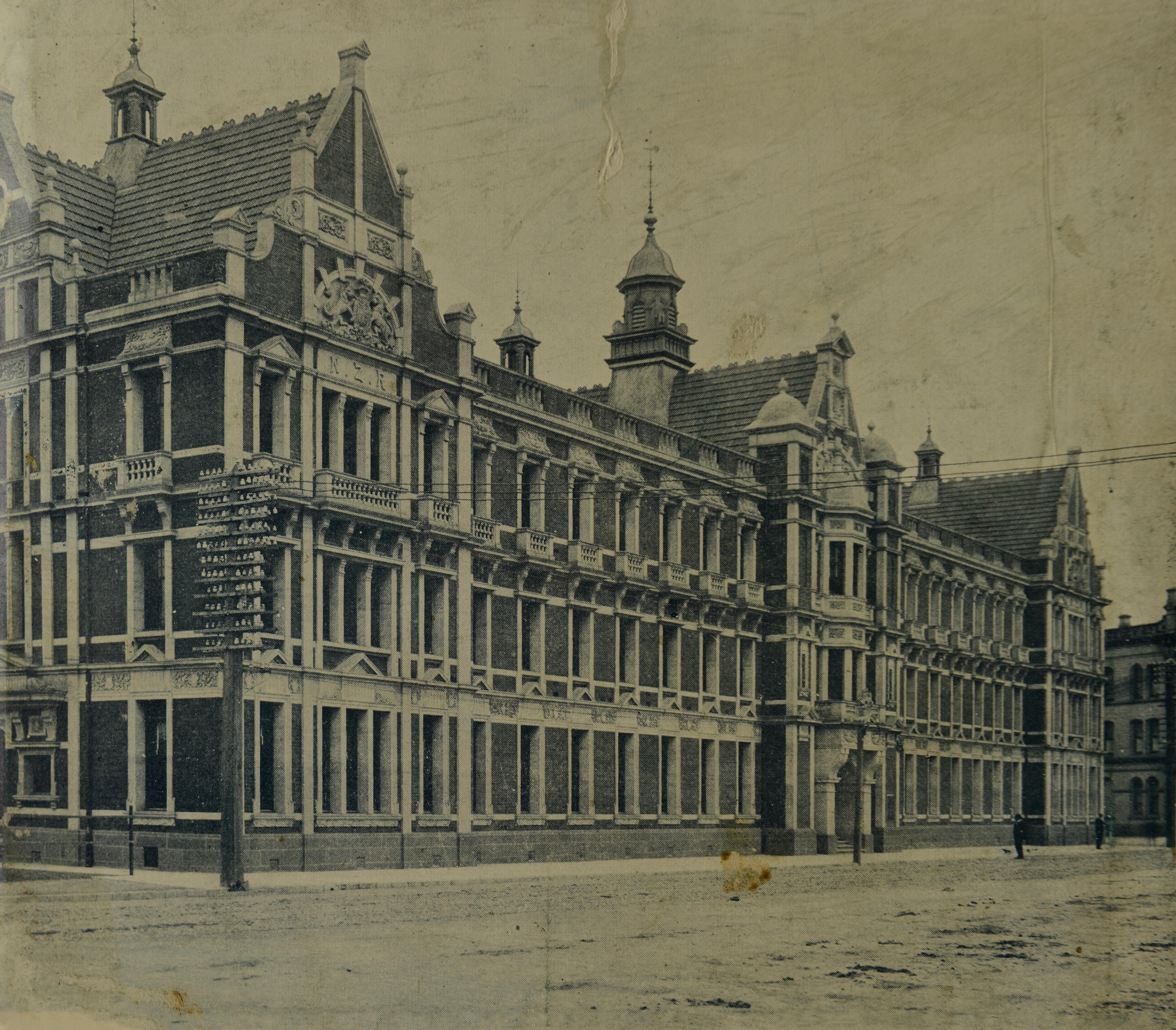
New Zealand Railways headquarters 1905 to 1937 at 75 Featherston Street

The Wairarapa Standard reported "The Wellington railway station has been shifted bodily to near Mulgrave Street."

The Goods shed followed in late August 1885. A gang of 30 or 40 men cut it into sections to fit on railways trucks and re-erected them close to the passenger station.

=== New Zealand Railways headquarters ===
This same site was used for the New Zealand Railways Department headquarters building begun in 1901 and completed in 1905. In 1937 it was vacated by NZR and taken over by the Defence Department. It was demolished and in the 21st century, its former frontage on Featherston Street is occupied by Rydges Hotel.

== Featherston Street opposite Mulgrave Street ==
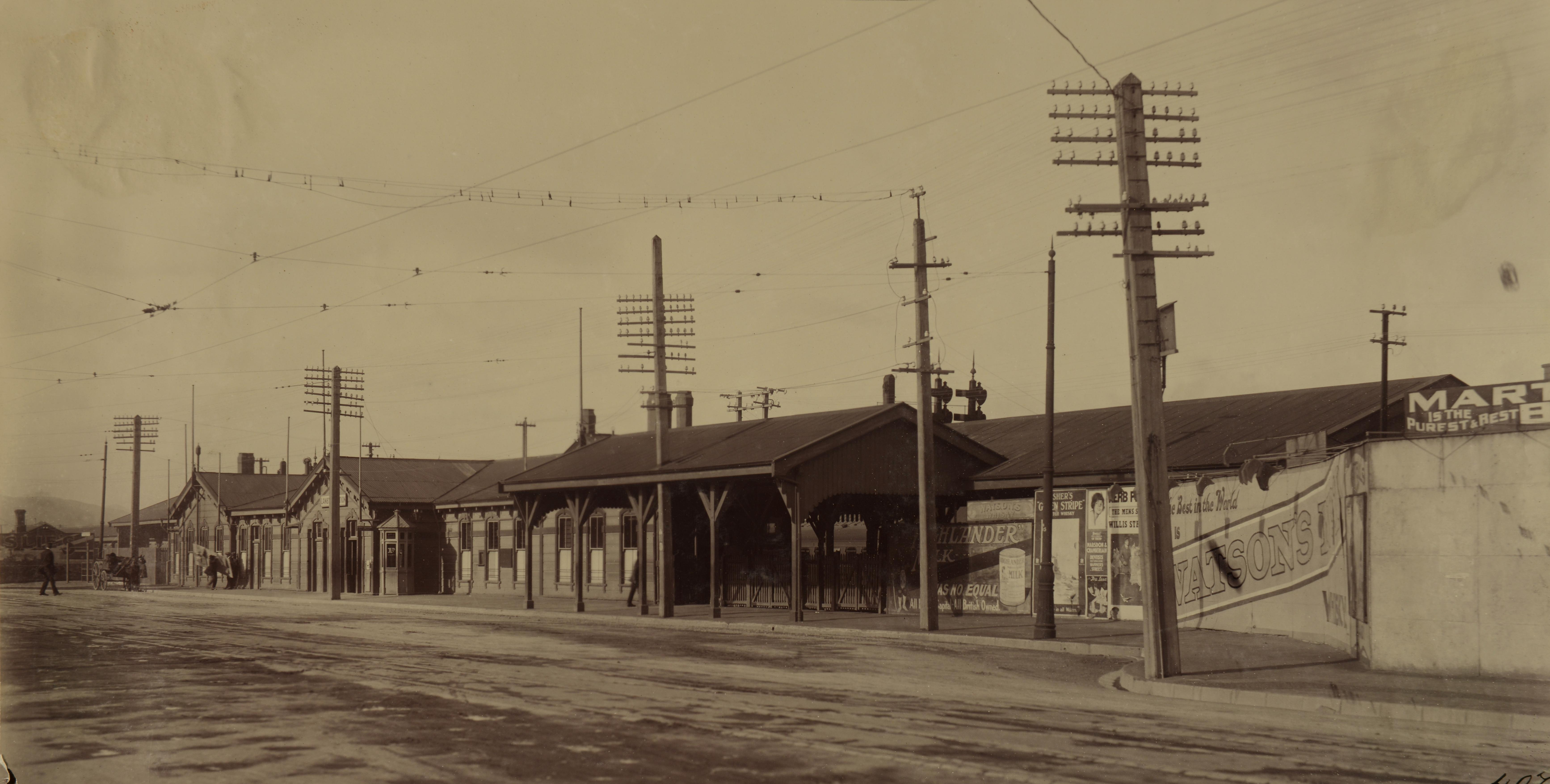
The building rolled from the headquarters site

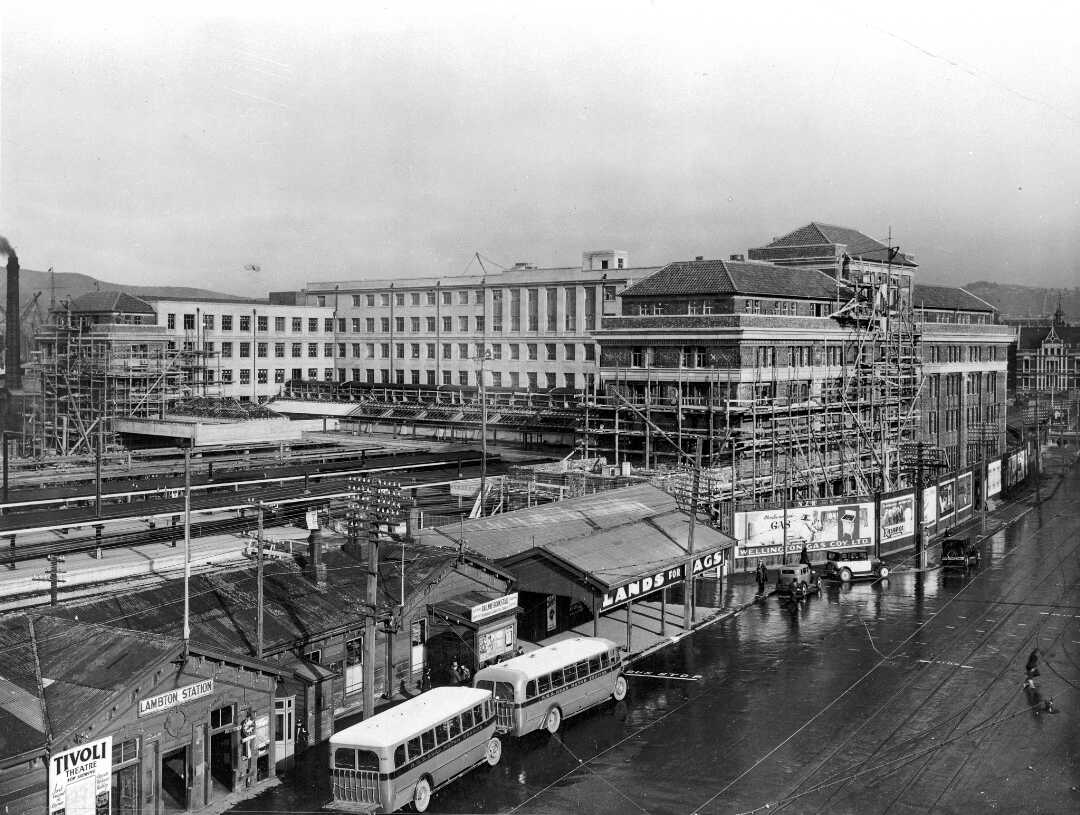
Featherston Street showing old Lambton station, the back of the new Bunny Street HQ and station and in the distance a Bunny Street gable of the old NZR HQ

The building at 75 Featherston Street was picked up, put on rollers and taken further north up Featherston Street to the far side of Bunny Street.

It was placed opposite the foot of Mulgrave Street and its junction with Sydney Street now Kate Sheppard Place.

It opened to passengers in late February 1885.

This building's name was changed from Wellington railway station to Lambton railway station in December 1908 after the Government acquired the Thorndon railway station along with Wellington and Manawatu Railway Company. By that time, 1908, the building was considered well beneath the required standard but it remained in use almost another thirty years until it was demolished in 1937. When Lambton station was eventually demolished it was noted by the local newspaper that the building had been vilified for more than twenty years and had been plainly rotten long before its demolition.

Wairarapa and Hutt passengers were moved to the new suburban platforms of the unfinished new Bunny Street building. The first Hutt Valley trains ran from the new platforms on 20 July 1936.

Lambton station's building was demolished shortly after the Bunny Street building opened.
