= Thorndon railway station =

Defunct railway station in New Zealand

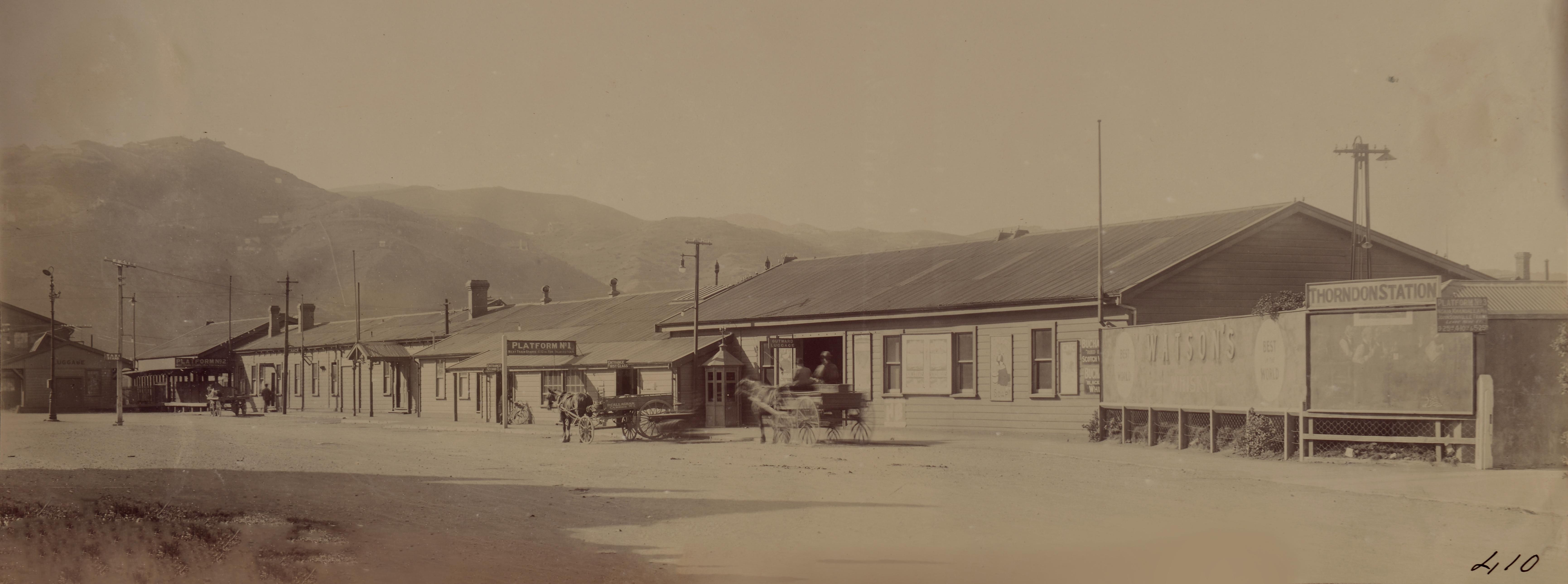
- Thorndon Railway Station (after November 1908)

General information
- Coordinates: 41°16′19.81″S 174°47′1.68″E
- System: commuter rail and regional rail
- Owner: Wellington and Manawatu Railway Company (WMR) until 7 December 1908; then New Zealand Railways Department (NZR)
- Lines: Wellington-Manawatu Line; North Island Main Trunk from December 1908
- Platforms: Side
- Tracks: Siding (1)

History
- Opened: 24 September 1885
- Closed: 19 June 1937 demolished July 1937
Location

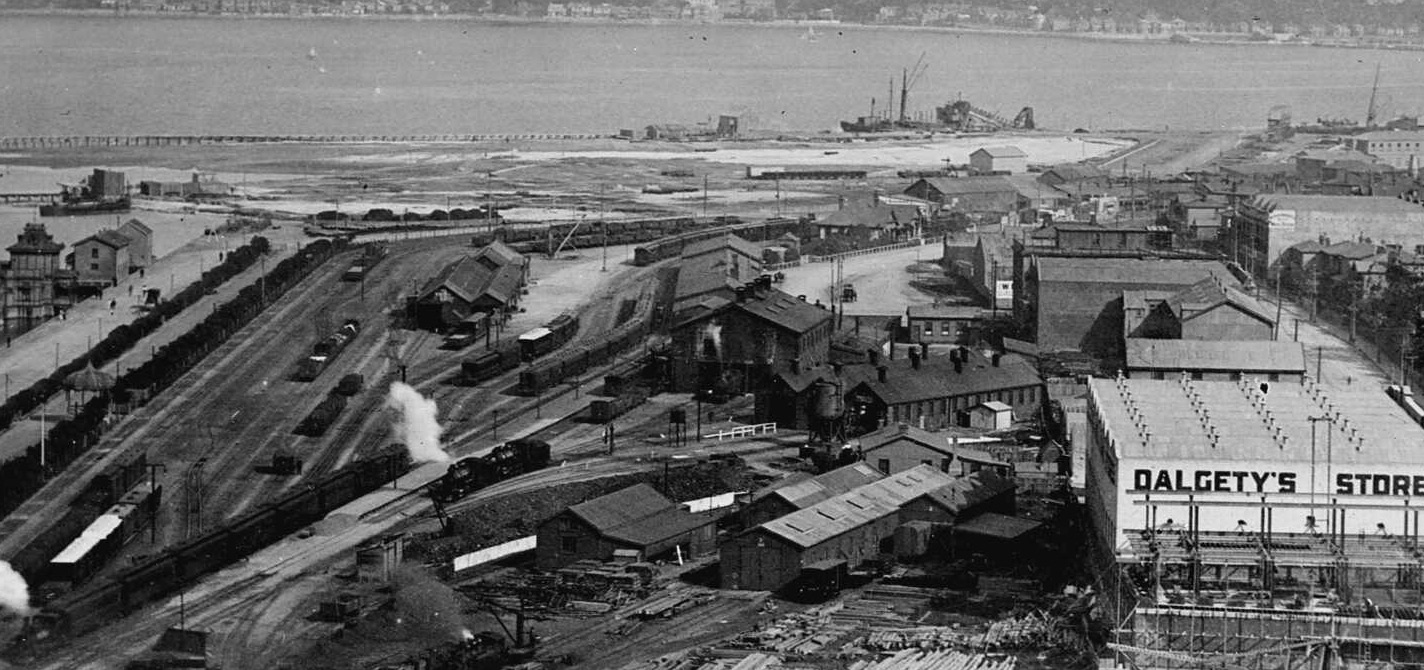
Thorndon station about 1905 looking south

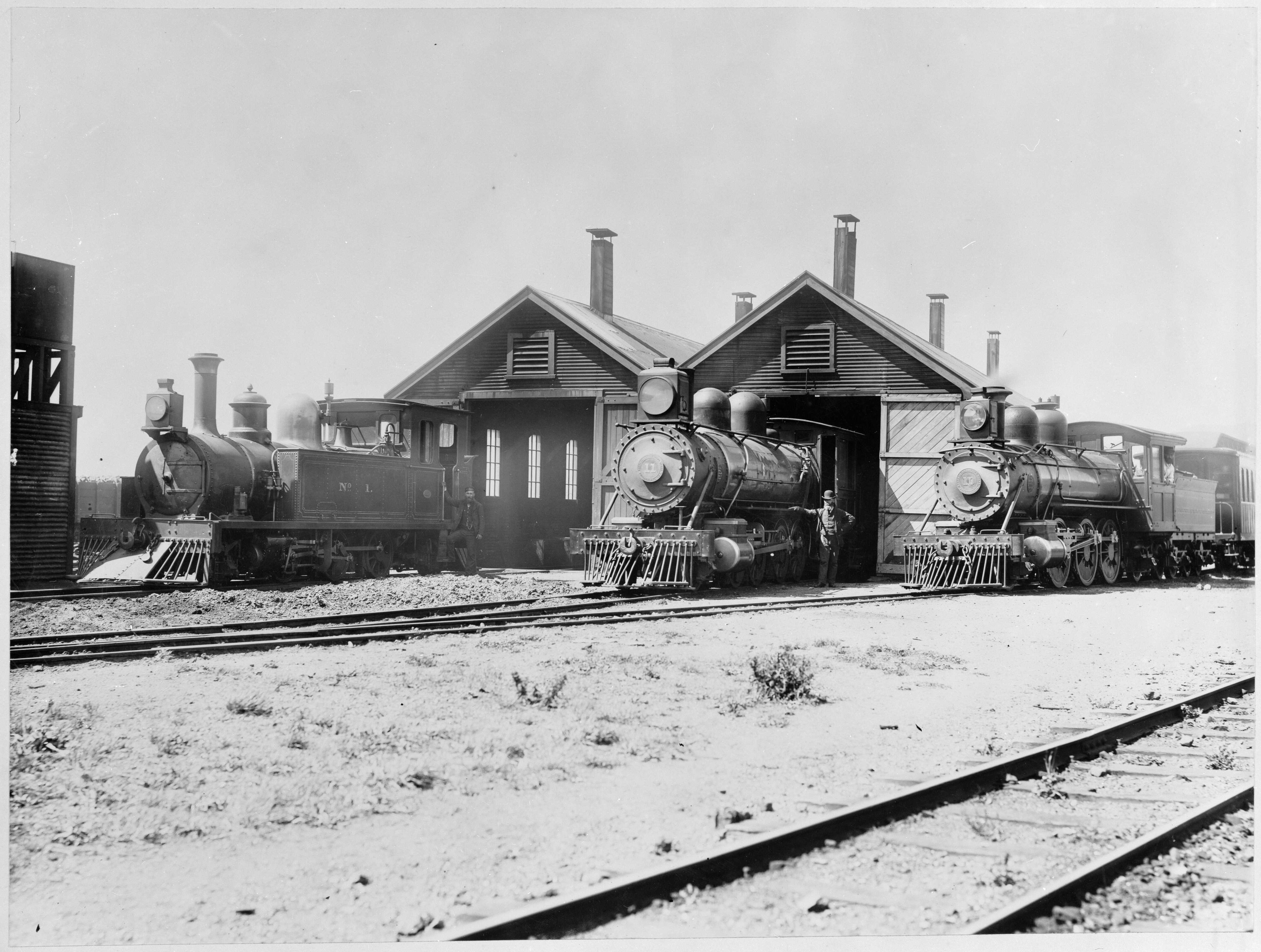
Locomotives and engine sheds

Thorndon railway station in Wellington, New Zealand, was opened in 1885 as the southern terminus of the Wellington and Manawatu Railway Company’s Wellington-Manawatu Line and then known as Wellington and Manawatu railway station. This line is now part of the Kāpiti section of the North Island Main Trunk.

The station closed on the evening of Saturday 19 June 1937, the day the new Bunny Street building opened. Tracks were moved and the building was demolished by the end of July.

== Description and location ==
The station began with one side platform and lit by electricity. The line's main terminus it was set up with a goods yard, engine shed, workshop and maintenance facilities.

It was built on land reclaimed in 1882. The company was allocated 19 of the 30 acres of reclamation made with spoil from the tunnels. Davis Street was extended in a dogleg across the reclamation to the new Thorndon Esplanade since covered by Aotea Quay. Road access to Thorndon station was from it but Davis Street Extension was eventually reduced to a driveway to the station's generous forecourt.

The first buildings were an engine shed, a workshop and a store all nearing completion in August 1884 though the exact site of the station itself was still undecided. The line was expected to reach Pipitea Point before the end of 1884. The locomotives were due in October. Wagons were already being assembled in the workshop.

=== Trial run ===
A special train set out from the Company's sheds on the morning of Wednesday 17 June 1885 carrying the board of directors and their chief and assistant engineers to make their first official inspection of the track to the Porirua bridge. Their ladies and other guests accompanied them and also press representatives who commended the well-padded second class seats in part describing the journey like this "As the train glided in and out of deep rocky cuttings and round curves, numerous most lovely bits of scenery were caught sight of".

The following Monday a shareholders meeting was to discuss the recommendation of the directors to withdraw the offer of sale to the Government in view of the news that there were good prospects of raising further capital in London. On 9 July The New Zealand Times reported unqualified success in raising the extra capital and that, among many others, two tenders were to be advertised for building the Wellington station. It was now settled that in the meantime there would be no connection with the Government's Wellington railway station in Featherston Street. Tenders were invited for "No. 4 station contract temporary building, Thorndon reclamation."

=== First run for paying passengers ===
The first timetable was published on 2 September 1885. The line to Paremata was opened on 21 September 1885 without any ceremony. A train of three carriages and a brake van left the Thorndon station at 9:10. There were 59 passengers booked, 42 to Paremata, 6 to Porirua, 3 to Tawa Flat and 8 to Johnsonville. Several excursions were made before 21 September but the passengers were guests of the company. The new station's connection to the telephone system was reported in October 1885. The line was opened to Plimmerton in October 1885 and to the Longburn terminus in November 1886. It had been planned to share Longburn Railway Station with the New Zealand Railways Department but no agreement could be reached.

== Services ==
Passenger trains were run to the Longburn terminus and local trains to Johnsonville, Porirua or Paekākāriki. By 1908 there were seven local trains each way on weekdays and Saturdays, and one each way on Sunday.

The Government line from Wellington through the Wairarapa and the Manawatū Gorge also had a station at Longburn and Thorndon's passengers could change trains there for what became the Main Trunk Line and the rapidly expanding Government network.

=== North Island Main Trunk ===
In December 1908 Thorndon became the terminal for the newly completed North Island Main Trunk. Wellington railway station in Featherston Street was renamed Wellington Lambton station and Thorndon officially became Wellington Thorndon station.

The last Limited Express arrived at Thorndon the morning of the day the station closed, Saturday 19 June 1937. The following Monday's Limited arrived at Bunny Street's Platform 8.

== Wellington and Manawatu Railway Company ==
This business was established to finish building the second or West Coast line out of Wellington after the new Government decided to abandon the project.

== Takeover ==
The Government took over Wellington and Manawatu Railway Company in December 1908 retaining Wellington railway station half a mile south in Featherston Street but renaming it Lambton Railway Station. Both were used until the new Wellington railway station was opened in June 1937.

== Closure and demolition ==
Thorndon closed in June 1937 so the railway yards could be reconfigured for the new platforms of the Bunny Street building. The last Limited (having a limited number of stops) arrived on the morning of Saturday 19 June 1937. Later the same day the last train out was scheduled to depart at 6:19pm followed by the last train in at 7:13pm.

Thorndon railway station building was demolished at the end of July. Lambton's platform had been closed to traffic in July 1936 but the building remained open until Bunny Street opening day to provide tickets and facilities and access to the new Bunny Street platforms.
