= Tawa, New Zealand =

Suburb of Wellington City, New Zealand

Tawa
- Suburb
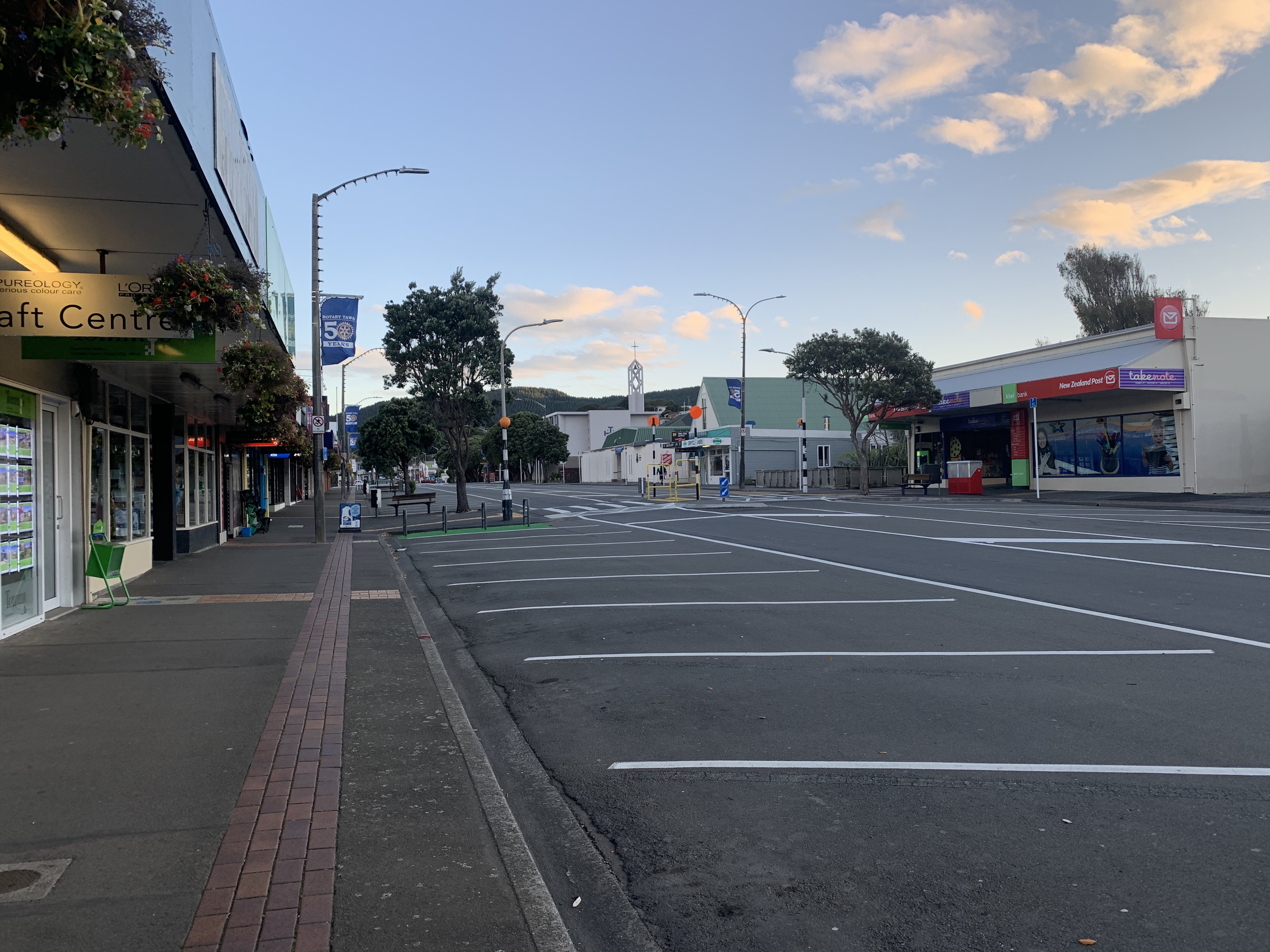
- Tawa's main shopping centre, photographed in April 2020
- Interactive map of Tawa
- Coordinates: 41°10′17.64″S 174°49′29.23″E
- Country: New Zealand
- City: Wellington
- Local authority: Wellington City Council
- Electoral ward: Takapū/Northern Ward; Te Whanganui-a-Tara Māori Ward
- Community board: Tawa Community Board

Area
  - Land: 664 ha (1,640 acres)

Population (June 2025)
  - Total: 13,310
  - Density: 2,000/km^{2} (5,190/sq mi)
- Railway stations: Takapu Road, Redwood, Tawa, Linden, Kenepuru

	Porirua	Linden
Ohariu	Tawa
Churton Park	Redwood

Tawa is the northernmost suburb within the Wellington city boundary, located roughly 15 km north of Wellington's CBD between Churton Park and Porirua in the North Island of New Zealand. It takes its name from the broadleaf tree, which was once prolific throughout the area, although its most famous tree is the Bucket Tree, a large macrocarpa with the topiary of an upside-down bucket. Tawa is also known for its large number of churches, representing a wide range of Christian denominations.

Within Tawa, there are a number of named subdivisions: Lindenvale, Westhaven, Redwood and Southgate to the west and Linden, Greenacres and Sundale to the east of the central Tawa area.

== Toponymy ==
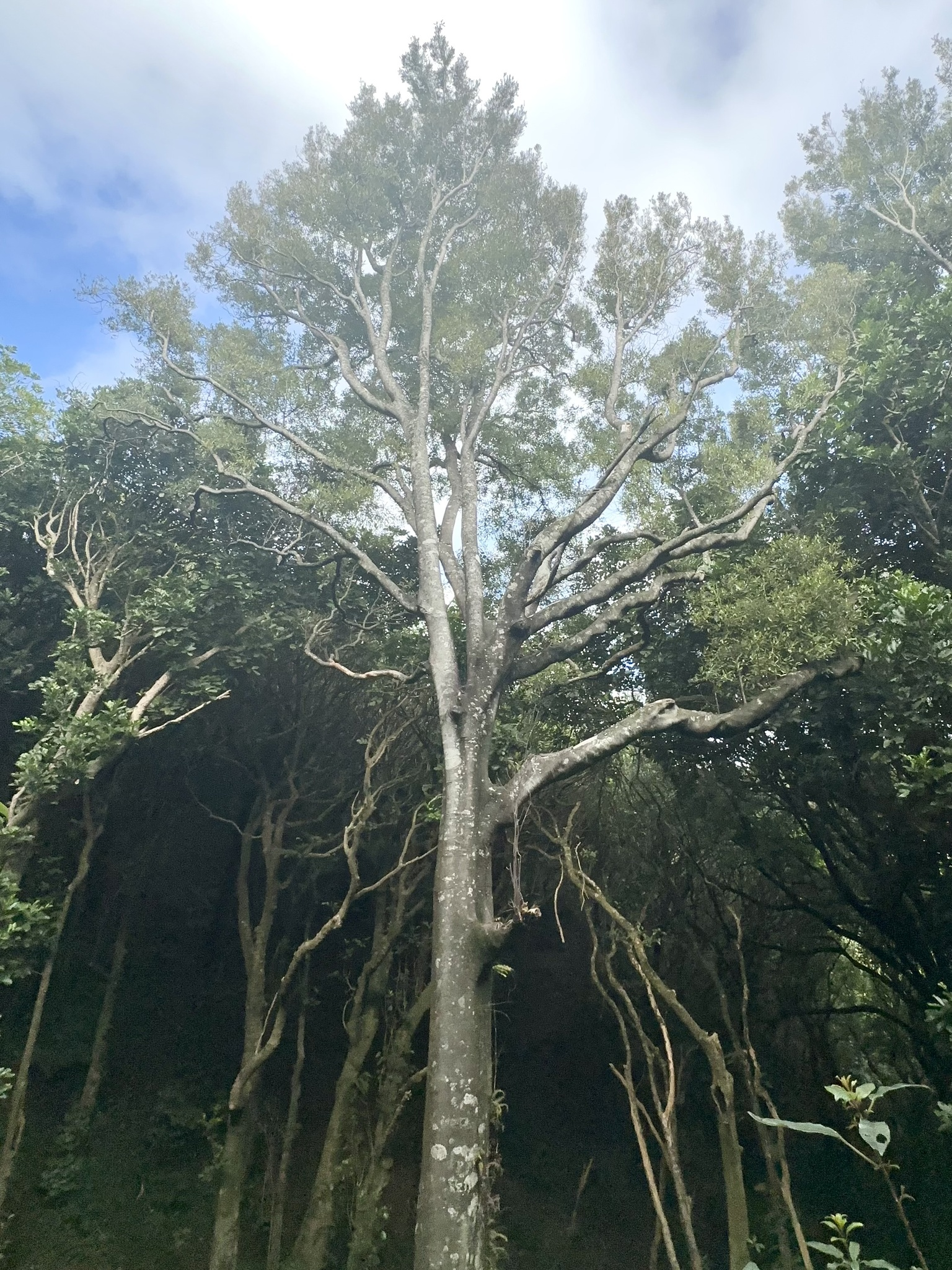
A tawa tree growing at Wilf Mexted Scenic Reserve in Tawa

Before 1959, Tawa was known as Tawa Flat, thought to be a reference to the Tawa trees that grew there and the flat and arable floor of the valley as it widened out in the Tawa area. The first known use of the name "Tawa Flat" was by John Woodman who used it as his address in the electoral roll for the Wellington Country District, published in the Wellington Provincial Gazette of 28 August 1854. As others living in the area gave their address in the 1854 roll as "Porirua Road", it is possible that John Woodman was the originator of the name.

Starting at the time of the Tawa Flat School and Tawa Flat District Centennial in 1955, there was a popular move to change the name of the "Borough of Tawa Flat" to the "Borough of Tawa" as more people now lived in the hilly areas on the sides of the valley or in Linden and only a minority lived in the area previously known as Tawa Flat. The New Zealand Geographic Board decided on 24 November 1958 "that on and after the 23rd of February 1959 the name of the Borough of Tawa Flat shall be Borough of Tawa." From 1959, the area became known as Tawa and usage of Tawa Flat has been discontinued.

== History ==
=== Early history ===
The iwi with mana whenua in Tawa are Ngāti Toa Rangatira and Taranaki Whānui. Ngāti Toa Rangatira have had parcels of land in Tawa and Linden returned to them as part of a housing partnership with the Crown.

Though Māori people had not previously settled in the Tawa valley, they would have passed through it when travelling between the centuries-old established populations at Porirua and Te Whanganui a Tara. A Māori track, later developed in the 1840s for the Old Porirua Road, ran between the two harbours, while another such track ran from Willowbank to the Horokiwi Ridge and Petone.

As with the rest of Wellington, Tawa was colonised by the New Zealand Company in the mid-19th century under the direction of Edward Gibbon Wakefield. The Company claimed to have purchased the land from local Māori - this claim "did not take into account of Maori existing land use, and was further undermined by the New Zealand Company and later by the government." It was divided into 100-acre blocks, providing some of the 100-acre "in the country" blocks that accompanied the one-acre "in town" (i.e., central Wellington) blocks, similar to other Company settlements. Much of the eastern side of the Tawa valley came to be owned by a single family until the demand for housing land overtook the benefits of farming the land. In 1951, a Town District was established covering Tawa and Linden. Within two years this had become Tawa Flat Borough.

=== Development ===
The development of Tawa, like many population centres, has been strongly tied to the development of transportation networks. It was initially a rural settlement established along the Old Porirua Road. During construction of the road in 1846-47, the road-making soldiers used two stockades, built a kilometre apart from each other, to sleep in and for protection from potential attacks. The initial settlers had to clear the surrounding heavy forests before they could begin building and farming on the land.

In 1851 the first church opened, and in 1855 the first school opened, but Tawa remained predominantly rural into the 20th century. While there were early efforts at housing subdivisions, first in 1896 and in 1906 with the establishment of the Tawa Land Company, they failed to attract much interest. Tawa didn't grow significantly until just before World War II, when it began to lose its semi-rural character.

A single-track railway line built by the Wellington and Manawatu Railway Company connected Tawa to Wellington from September 1885, and to Palmerston North from November 1886. It followed a circuitous route from Wellington via the Ngaio Gorge and Johnsonville. This line was incorporated into the New Zealand Railways Department network in December 1908. Tawa's first railway station, Tawa Flat station, opened on 24 September 1885. The station was located on the hillside above the valley floor on what is now Duncan Street, on the straight section of road about 180 metres north of the intersection of Duncan Street with the junction of Tawa Street and Tawa Terrace.

During the 1850s William Earp, the landowner of Boscobel Farm, planted a macrocarpa on his property. It became known as the 'Earp Macrocarpa' or the Bucket Tree as it was shaped to resemble an upside down bucket. In 2026 it won NZ Tree of the Year.

==== 1930s and 40s: The Tawa Flat deviation ====
From June 1937, the double-tracked Tawa Flat deviation diverted the North Island Main Trunk railway from Thorndon through Kaiwharawhara and two significant new tunnels to the Tawa valley to provide a shorter faster rail route with easier grades and higher speed curves. The new deviation reduced the travel time between Wellington and Tawa by 15 minutes. The old and new routes diverged in Thorndon and merged again north of the present-day Tawa Railway Station near the front entrance to Tawa College. Part of the old rail route through Tawa, from Tawa Street to Tawa College, became the southern part of Duncan Street while the old railway alignment from Tawa Street to Takapu Road remained as a pleasant walking track.

The new deviation provided two new railway stations that opened on 20 June 1937, one at Takapu Road and a new Tawa Flat Railway Station on an island platform built on the valley floor, below and 400 metres north of the old railway station. A crossing loop was provided at Tawa Flat with crossovers north and south of the station to allow trains to terminate at Tawa Flat and return to Wellington or Porirua. A siding was provided to support local businesses. The new Tawa Flat station was equipped with an enclosed waiting room, toilets for men and women, and a stationmaster's office with a ticket sale window opening to the waiting room. A miniature lever frame allowed signals to be locally controlled. Trains between Kaiwharawhara and Tawa ran on double line automatic signalling. The tablet system remained in use on the single line section from Tawa to Porirua.

With the completion of the deviation, the railway connection between Johnsonville and Tawa was severed on 19 June 1937. The original line from Wellington to Johnsonville was electrified and reopened as the Johnsonville Branch. The railway line from Tawa to Porirua remained single track with no stations between Tawa and Porirua until the new Linden station opened on 28 July 1940.

Electrification of the North Island Main Trunk was completed from Wellington to Paekakariki in 1940 and a modern automatic signalling system was installed to enable trains to operate at frequent intervals. From 1940, the shorter and faster train service to Wellington using passenger cars hauled by electric locomotives made Tawa a more desirable place to live.

Arohata Women's Prison, located at the southern end of Tawa, was built in 1944 and was originally a women's borstal. It became a youth prison in 1981 and a women's prison in 1987.

==== 1950s and 60s: improved train service, motorway opening, rapid population growth ====
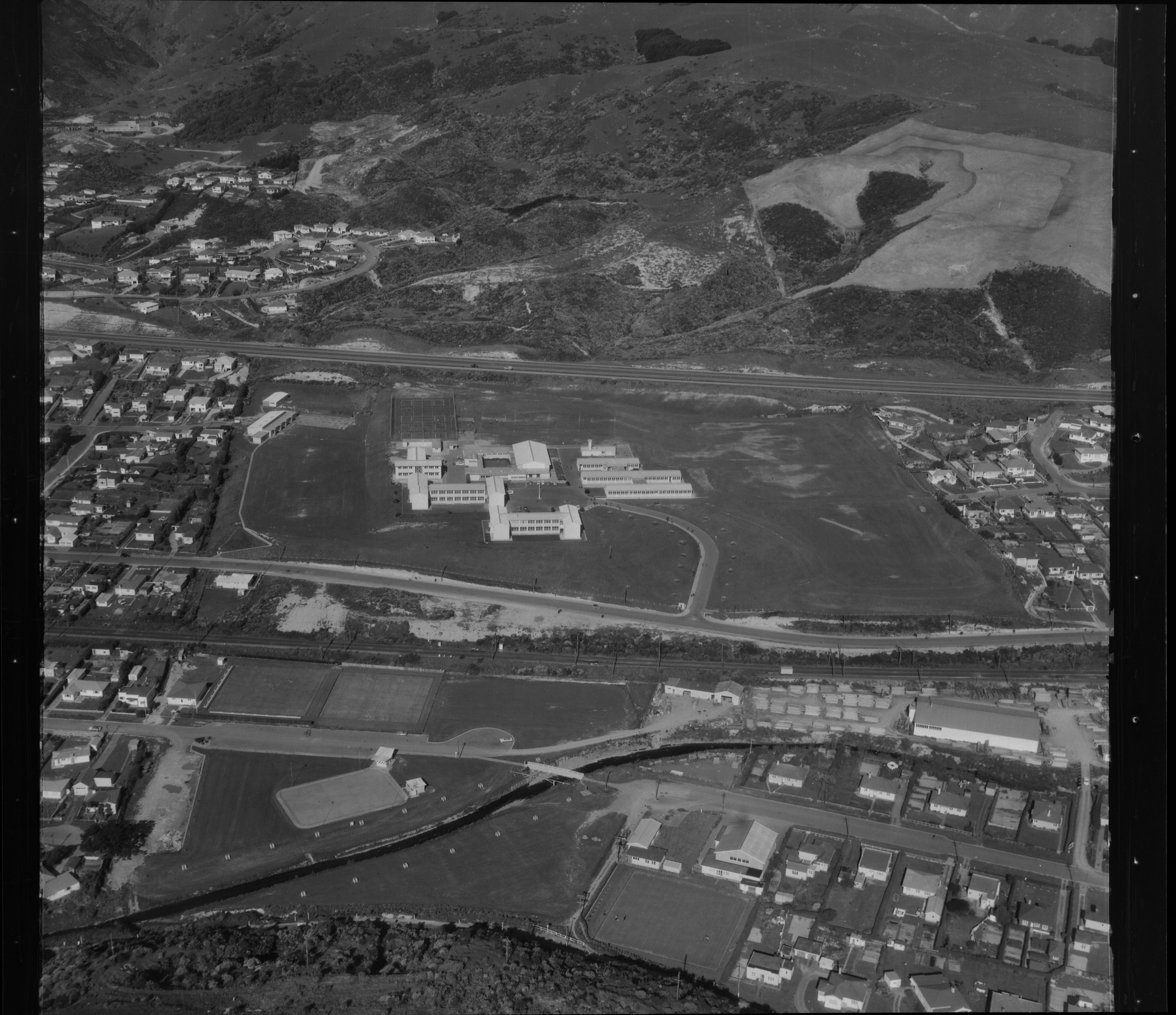
Tawa College in 1965

A much improved, faster, and more frequent, rail service resulted from the Tawa Flat deviation in the late 1930s, electrification of the railway line with an automatic signalling system in 1940, and the arrival of additional electric multiple units in the late 1940s and early 1950s. The first multiple units operated on the line from 5 September 1949 but electric locomotive-hauled trains continued to operate in peak periods as there were insufficient multiple units until the arrival of the first Ganz Mavag EM/ET units in 1982.

It was now quicker and easier for residents of Tawa to commute to Wellington to work in the central Wellington area. Travel time by rail from Tawa to central Wellington was now less than from many Wellington City suburbs and the fares were competitive.

On 15 December 1957, the duplication of the railway line from Tawa to Porirua was completed and a new Linden railway station on an island platform replaced the old shelter. With the duplication to Porirua, double line automatic signalling was extended from Tawa to Porirua and the tablet system was removed. The miniature lever frame controlling the signalling in Tawa could now be "switched-out" to automatic double-track operation or "switched-in" when required for shunting of goods trains or other movements requiring the use of the crossovers. This meant that Tawa station only require manning for occasional train movements.

Two new railway stations were built in the 1960s to meet the growing demand for rail services: Kenepuru station opened on 8 April 1963 and Redwood station on 15 December 1963. Tawa was now served by five railway stations. A feature of the new Redwood station was the staggering of the platforms north and south of the level crossing at Tawa Street to avoid the excessive operation of the warning lights and bells and barrier arms at the Tawa Street level crossing.

During the 1950s, the high-speed Johnsonville–Porirua Motorway was built through Tawa on the eastern side of the valley. The first section that broadly followed the line of the old North Island Main Trunk railway from Johnsonville to the Tawa turnoff at Takapu Road at the southern entrance to Tawa was opened on 15 December 1951. The second section, from Takapu Road to Porirua, was opened about five years later and the Johnsonville bypass connecting the south end of the motorway to the top of Ngauranga Gorge about the same time. The first section, from Johnsonville to Takapu Road, reduced road travel times and considerably improved access to Wellington by eliminating the need to use the narrow winding road through the bottom of the valley and Glenside. The second section allowed through traffic to bypass Tawa reducing traffic on the Main Road in Tawa. The southern and northern accesses to Tawa were improved by straightening and widening narrow sections of the Main Road at Takapu Road and Kenepuru Drive between Linden and Porirua.

Demand for new housing diminished in the 1930s and early 1940s, but from the mid-1940s a country-wide surge in marriage and birth rates occurred. With a shortage of suitable new housing areas in Wellington City, and with Tawa now more accessible with improved road and rail access, Tawa became a popular place for new private housing. Land was at a premium in the steep terrain of the Wellington region and the flat areas and moderate hills of Tawa were attractive. The Tawa microclimate, sometimes up to five degrees Celsius warmer than Wellington when the foehn effect occurs at the tail end of a southerly wind, was an added attraction. It could be fine and warm in Tawa when Wellington was cold and overcast. New subdivisions followed and the population expanded rapidly. Tawa became one of the fastest-growing areas in the country. State housing subdivisions at Kenepuru and Hampton Hill in the late 1950s and early 1960s added to the population growth.

Population growth and a need to ensure primary schools were within walking distance for children led to the opening of new schools. A new public primary school was opened in Linden in 1952 to take the pressure off the long-established Tawa School. Tawa College was opened in 1960, eliminating the need for Tawa students to travel to Porirua or Wellington for Secondary Education. Tawa College was built on land that straddles the motorway, with the main school campus west of the motorway and additional playing fields to the east. A subway under the motorway links the two parts of Tawa College and provides public access. St. Francis Xavier School, a Catholic primary school, opened in Redwood in 1960. The demand for new primary schools continued in the 1960s: Hampton Hill School was opened in 1965 and Redwood School in 1966.

==== 1970s to present day ====
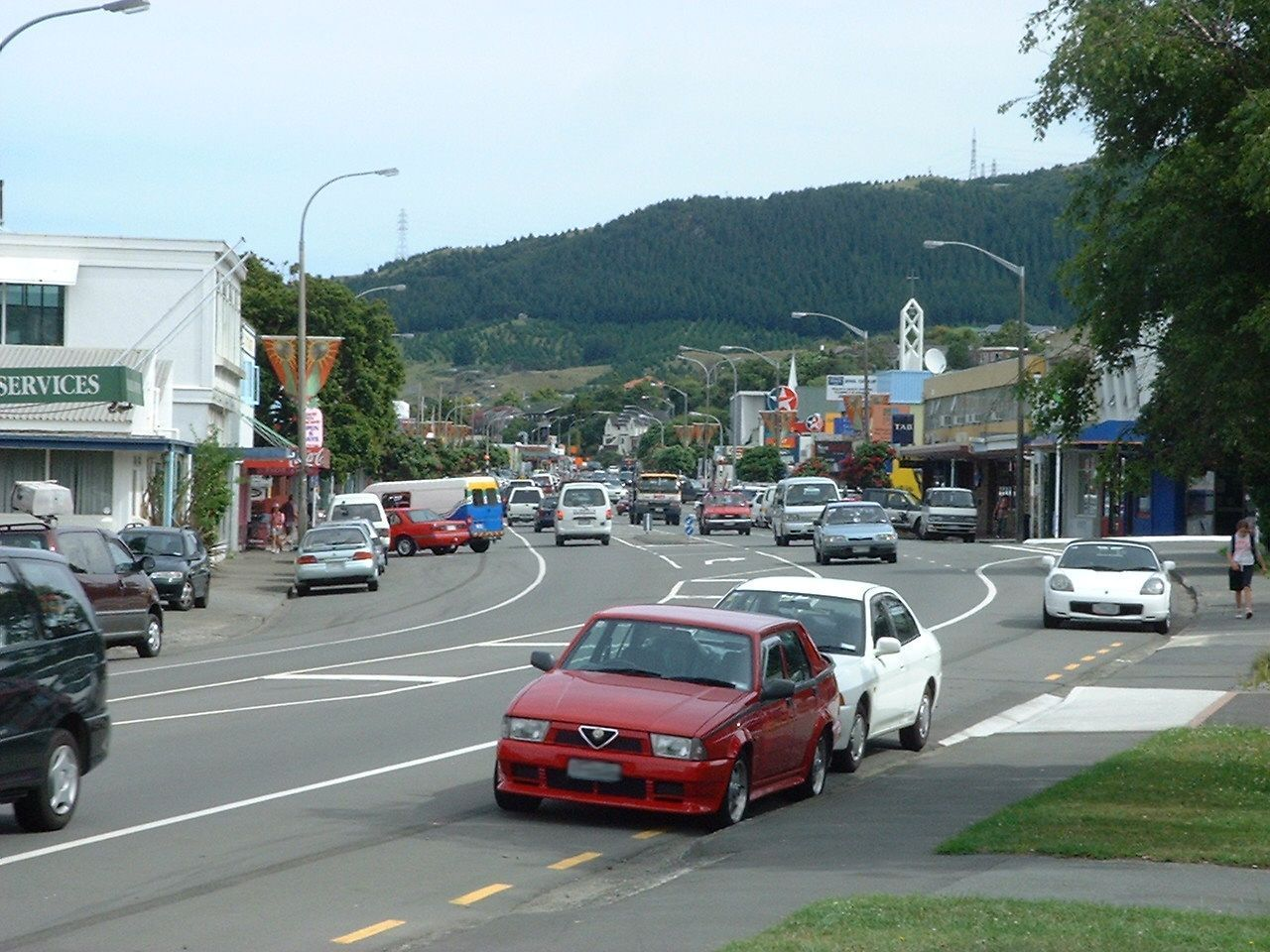
Main street in 2005

During the 1970s, Tawa experienced significant residential growth, Redwood and parts of Sundale in particular expanded outward. To meet the growth, Greenacres primary school opened in 1972 and Tawa Intermediate in 1975. The opening of Tawa Intermediate took the pressure off the primary schools by catering for year 7 and 8 education that was previously provided by the primary schools.

Since the 1990s, Tawa has been expanding more slowly. By the turn of the 21st Century, most of the greenfield residential growth in Tawa has occurred to the east of the Motorway, mainly spreading eastward up toward the parallel Takapu Valley in the direction of the Belmont Range.

Whilst greenfield residential growth has slowed, there has been significant infill housing as property owners, particularly owners of older quarter acre sections, subdivide their properties. Along with infill housing, the turn of the 21st century has seen the redevelopment of some of Tawa's previously industrial areas including the development of Dress Smart - an outlet shopping centre - and the retirement village, Redwood village. Tawa's latest retail development is located on what is colloquially known as "Takapu Island"; a site located alongside the Tawa motorway off-ramp where a new supermarket was opened in September 2012. Conversely, one of Tawa's other shopping centres, Tawa Junction, closed in 2008 after a lengthy period with few occupants and has since been mooted as a location for another retirement village.

On 27 November 1999 Tawa, along with Mount Eden and Mount Roskill, became the last place in New Zealand to vote in favour of becoming "wet" in local restoration polls. Voting to become "wet" allowed the purchase of alcohol within the suburb for the first time and since then several pubs and bars have opened.

== Geography ==
Tawa lies in a wide section of a roughly north/south valley which opens up on the north into the Porirua Basin. The valley is about 4.5 km in length (north-south) and 2.5 km wide (east-west). The Belmont range, to the east, separates the Tawa valley from the Hutt Valley, while the Ohariu Valley is located to the west of Tawa. The northern entrance to Tawa is where Kenepuru Drive becomes Main Road, and its southern entrance is the Tawa exit of the Johnsonville-Porirua Motorway (State Highway 1). The Porirua Stream flows northwards along the valley, fed by a number of tributaries, including the Takapu Stream.

== Demography ==
Tawa, comprising the statistical areas of Linden, Tawa North, Tawa South and Tawa Central, covers 6.64 km^{2} (2.56 sq mi). It had an estimated population of 13,310 as of June 2025, with a population density of 2,005 people per km^{2}.

Historical population
Year	Pop.	±% p.a.
2006	11,679	—
2013	11,943	+0.32%
2018	12,516	+0.94%
2023	12,654	+0.22%

Tawa had a population of 12,654 in the 2023 New Zealand census, an increase of 138 people (1.1%) since the 2018 census, and an increase of 711 people (6.0%) since the 2013 census. There were 6,156 males, 6,423 females, and 75 people of other genders in 4,422 dwellings. 4.2% of people identified as LGBTIQ+. The median age was 36.6 years (compared with 38.1 years nationally). There were 2,490 people (19.7%) aged under 15 years, 2,418 (19.1%) aged 15 to 29, 6,111 (48.3%) aged 30 to 64, and 1,635 (12.9%) aged 65 or older.

People could identify as more than one ethnicity. The results were 66.4% European (Pākehā); 13.3% Māori; 11.1% Pasifika; 21.1% Asian; 2.4% Middle Eastern, Latin American and African New Zealanders (MELAA); and 3.1% other, which includes people giving their ethnicity as "New Zealander". English was spoken by 95.2%, Māori by 3.3%, Samoan by 3.5%, and other languages by 20.3%. No language could be spoken by 2.7% (e.g. too young to talk). New Zealand Sign Language was known by 0.7%. The percentage of people born overseas was 32.5, compared with 28.8% nationally.

Religious affiliations were 35.7% Christian, 3.6% Hindu, 1.6% Islam, 0.6% Māori religious beliefs, 2.1% Buddhist, 0.4% New Age, 0.2% Jewish, and 1.6% other religions. People who answered that they had no religion were 48.7%, and 5.8% of people did not answer the census question.

Of those at least 15 years old, 3,492 (34.4%) people had a bachelor's or higher degree, 4,713 (46.4%) had a post-high school certificate or diploma, and 1,956 (19.2%) people exclusively held high school qualifications. The median income was $50,700, compared with $41,500 nationally. 1,833 people (18.0%) earned over $100,000 compared to 12.1% nationally. The employment status of those at least 15 was 5,805 (57.1%) full-time, 1,296 (12.8%) part-time, and 309 (3.0%) unemployed.

Individual statistical areas
Name	Area (km^{2})	Population	Density (per km^{2})	Dwellings	Median age	Median income
Linden	1.12	3,324		1,194	34.2 years	$44,100
Tawa North	1.64	3,192		1,059	35.7 years	$51,700
Tawa Central	1.53	2,703		1,029	37.3 years	$51,600
Tawa South	2.55	3,435		1,137	39.5 years	$55,700
New Zealand					38.1 years	$41,500

== Local government ==
When New Zealand became a separate Colony from New South Wales in 1841, the royal charter established three provinces. The Tawa area became part of New Munster which included that part of the North Island south of the Patea River and the whole of the South Island. In 1846 the British Parliament passed the first constitution act, the New Zealand Constitution Act 1846 which reformed the provinces and the Tawa area became part of New Ulster which now included all of the North Island. The provinces were reformed again with the New Zealand Constitution Act 1852 which established six provinces with Tawa included in the Wellington Province. Provincial Government was abolished in 1876 and replaced with 36 borough councils and 63 county councils. The Tawa area became part of the Porirua Riding of the Hutt County, formed in 1877. The Hutt County covered all the area south of the Waikanae River and West of the Remutaka Ranges that lay outside of Wellington City. As the population of local areas grew, a number of local boroughs were split off from the Hutt County. In 1908, a smaller Makara County with offices in Porirua was formed from the Mākara and Porirua Ridings or the south-western part of the Hutt County. The new Makara County included Porirua, Tītahi Bay, and Tawa Flat, and all of the area to the south lying to the west of Wellington City outside the areas covered by Wellington City and the new and independent boroughs of Miramar, Karori, Onslow, and Johnsonville.

In 1939, northern Tawa valley residents seeking to give a separate name to the northern part of the Tawa district met. They chose "Linden", from "Linden Vale", the name of the home of Mr Stuart Duncan, but originally named by Mr. Charles Duncan, a nurseryman. The name "Linden" was adopted in 1940 and the first Linden railway station was opened on 30 April 1941. In 1948, the Tawa Flat and Linden Progressive Associations and Porirua interests, led by Arthur Carman and Percy Clark, made a representation to the Local Government Commission asking for a single borough covering the whole of the Porirua Basin.

The commission did not accept this proposal but responded by giving the Tawa Flat-Linden area the status of a town district able to elect its own town board. A roll of 1,700 electors was compiled and on 16 May 1951 the first town board was elected. Urbanisation and population growth continued in the Tawa valley and in 1953 the population had reached 3,900, sufficient for an upgrade of the town district to a borough. The upgrade to the Borough of Tawa Flat was approved in October 1953.

In 1988 the Local Government Commission proposed that Tawa amalgamate with Porirua City or Wellington City with no option to remain an independent borough allowed. The proposal was opposed by the Tawa Borough Council and a majority of residents. Despite efforts by Porirua City to entice Tawa residents to amalgamate with Porirua City many Tawa citizens indicated a preference for amalgamation with Wellington City. On 3 October 1988, the Local Government Commission decreed that the Borough of Tawa would amalgamate with Wellington City. The Tawa Community Board was set up in 1989 to replace the Borough Council.

Tawa now contributes, as part of Wellington city's Northern Ward, to elect three Wellington city councillors. Tawa retains a community board, which represents the suburb in matters of local and community affairs. The former Mayor of Wellington, Kerry Prendergast, originally came on to the Wellington City Council following time as a Tawa Borough councillor.

As of the 2025 local elections the Tawa Community Board members are:

Tawa Community Board
Name	Affiliation	Position
Jill Day	Independent	Chair
Tim Davin	Independent	Deputy chair
Miriam Moore	Independent	Board member
Michael Hill	Independent	Board member
Carla Bates	Independent	Board member
Rob Suisted	Independent	Board member
Cr Ben McNulty (Deputy Mayor)	Labour	Council appointee
Cr Andrea Compton	Independent	Council appointee

== Infrastructure ==
=== Transportation ===
Loosely following the path of the Porirua Stream through the valley is the North Island Main Trunk line; the Kāpiti Line of the Wellington suburban railway, operated by Transdev Wellington (under the trading name Metlink). Slightly to the east, the Johnsonville-Porirua Motorway, a dual-carriageway section of State Highway 1, follows a similar path. Both have played an important role in the suburb's development and in providing access. The literally named Main Road runs down the centre of the suburb and provides access to the smaller suburban streets. Main Road and Kenepuru Drive were part of State Highway 1 before the building of the motorway in the 1950s.

Tawa has five suburban passenger railway-stations: Kenepuru, Linden, Tawa, Redwood and Takapu Road. A significant number of commuters travel daily by train into the Wellington CBD to work. As a result, trains are a significant component of Tawa's public transport, but the suburb is also served by a bus route linking Porirua and Johnsonville. Despite these bus and train services, a substantial area on Tawa's fringes remains over 400 metres from public transport, particularly in Redwood, Greenacres and Linden. Measured this way, while the parts of Tawa near the railway and Main Road are among the best-served suburbs in Wellington in terms of public transport, these areas on the fringes are among the worst served.

In 2009 the Wellington City Council commenced work on a shared pedestrian/cycle trail through Tawa to Porirua City Centre. The trail comprises a combination of new paths following the Porirua Stream and rail corridor, and some widened existing footpaths. The Wellington City section of the trail, between Takapu Road railway station in the south and Kenepuru railway station in the north, was completed in 2013. The Porirua City section of the trail was built on an existing unsealed trail and completed about March 2014.

=== Community facilities ===
Tawa has a number of community facilities. Upgraded in 2002 at a cost of NZ$1.6 million, the Mervyn Kemp Library is located on the corner of the Main Rd and Cambridge St. Also on Cambridge St is the Tawa Community Centre, which now also occupies the space vacated by the ANZ Bank when it closed its Tawa Branch. On November 13, 2004 the $2.4 million Tawa Recreation Centre was opened. The Centre is located at Tawa College and is a partnership between the College and the Wellington City Council. Located on Davies St is the Tawa Pool, which features a 25-metre heated indoor swimming pool, learner pool, toddler pool, spa and sauna.

=== Retail facilities ===
Along with Outlet City, much of Tawa's current retail and manufacturing businesses are located along the Main Road. The section of the Main Road between Lyndhurst Road and Lincoln Ave forms the village centre of Tawa and provides day-to-day retail services including supermarket, mail, and pharmacy services. Also present in along the Main Road are the Mervyn Kemp Library, medical centre, dentists, banks, many restaurants and takeaway shops. A secondary retail centre is located alongside Linden Station.

=== Sporting facilities ===
Tawa is also home to a number of other community run sporting facilities. Alongside the Tawa pool is the Tawa Bowls club. Tawa St is home to the North Wellington Badminton Association, which boasts a 6 court tournament class stadium. Also on Tawa St is the Tawa-Lyndhurst Tennis Club, which has 8 plexipave tennis courts. Tawa-Lyndhurst Tennis Club is also where Tennis Inc coaching academy is based. There are a number of rugby union grounds in Tawa, with Tawa Rugby located at Lyndhurst park. There are a number of cricket ovals in Tawa, including Linden Park. The Tawa Squash club is located on the Main Rd. There are several football grounds for different grades in Tawa, including the use of the College grounds, the clubroom is shared with the Tawa Softball Club. Tawa is also home to the Tawa Mah Jong Club, which hosts the Wellington Mah Jong Tournament each June, as well as the Kapi Mana Bridge Club.

=== Parks ===
Along with built facilities, Tawa also boasts a large number of landscaped and natural parks, many of which contain play areas and open spaces. The Porirua Stream flows through a number of these parks. Community groups in Tawa, including the Friends of Tawa Bush Reserves, have increasingly worked in partnership with the local council to take interest and ownership of protecting Tawa's bush-clad environment, waterways and community parks.

== Education ==
Linden School is covered at Linden.

All these schools are co-educational. Rolls are as of July 2026.

=== Primary schools ===
Tawa School is a state primary school for Year 1 to 8 students, with a roll of 413. It opened in 1855 as Tawa Flat School.

Hampton Hill School is a state primary school for Year 1 to 8 students, with a roll of 112. It was founded in 1965.

Greenacres School is a state primary school for Year 1 to 6 students, with a roll of 154. It was founded in 1972.

Redwood School is a state primary school for Year 1 to 6 students, with a roll of 372 as of 18 April 2017. It was founded on 2 February 1966.

St Francis Xavier School is a state-integrated Catholic primary school for Year 1 to 6 students, with a roll of 163 as of 28 May 2019. It was founded in 1960.

=== Intermediate and secondary schools ===
Tawa Intermediate is a state intermediate school for Year 7 to 8 students, with a roll of 453. It was founded in 1975.

Tawa College is a state secondary school for Year 9 to 13 students, with a roll of 1,039. It was founded in 1961.

== Churches and other religious groups ==
Churches in Tawa include:

- Tawa-Linden Anglican Church
- Tawa Baptist Church
- Our Lady of Fatima Catholic Church
- Church of Jesus Christ of Latter Day Saints
- Gospel Hall
- Samoan Methodist Parish
- New Life Church
- Salvation Army
- Tawa Samoan Assembly of God
- Tawa Union Church

In 2011 the Exclusive Brethren in Wellington relocated to Tawa from Crofton Downs and a number of their membership moved into the area. The Samoan Methodist Parish now occupies the property previously occupied by the Free Presbyterian Church of Scotland.

There is also a Christadelphian Ecclesia in Linden, as well as a traditional Catholic chapel, run by priests from the Society of St. Pius X, who are based in Whanganui.

A Buddhist Dhamma Gavesi Meditation Centre was established in Tawa in 2011.

== Notable residents and former residents ==
- Elsdon Best - Māori ethnologist
- Ashley Bloomfield - Director-General of Health
- Arthur Carman - bookseller, sports writer and local historian
- Jerry Collins - All Blacks captain
- Sophie Devine - cricket and hockey player, White Fern and Black Sticks women
- Mark Gillespie - former Black Caps medium pace bowler
- Blair Hilton - Black Sticks Men, national field hockey representative and 2010 CommonWealth Games bronze medalist
- Amelia Kerr - White Fern
- Jess Kerr - White Fern
- Graham Mexted - All Black
- Murray Mexted - All Black captain
- Bruce Murray - former Black Caps opening batsman and historian of Tawa
- Kerry Prendergast - former Mayor of Wellington
- Lee Tamahori - film director
- Hugh Templeton - politician

== In fiction ==
Comedian Ginette McDonald created the character Lynn of Tawa, who became a "household name" in New Zealand in the 1970s. McDonald's characterisation satirised New Zealand's middle-class suburban values.

== See also ==
- Mayor of Tawa

== Sources ==
- Carman, Arthur H (1956, 1970, 1982) Tawa Flat and the Old Porirua Road, ASIN B0007K64LC
- K. R. Cassells (1988) TAWA Enterprise and Endeavour, Tawa Borough Council, ISBN 0-473-00715-0
- Murray, Bruce (2005) The Streets of Tawa, ISBN 0473101882
