= Redwood, New Zealand =

Redwood, New Zealand may refer to:

- Redwood, Christchurch
- Redwood, Wellington
