= Awarua Street railway station =

Railway station in New Zealand

Awarua Street
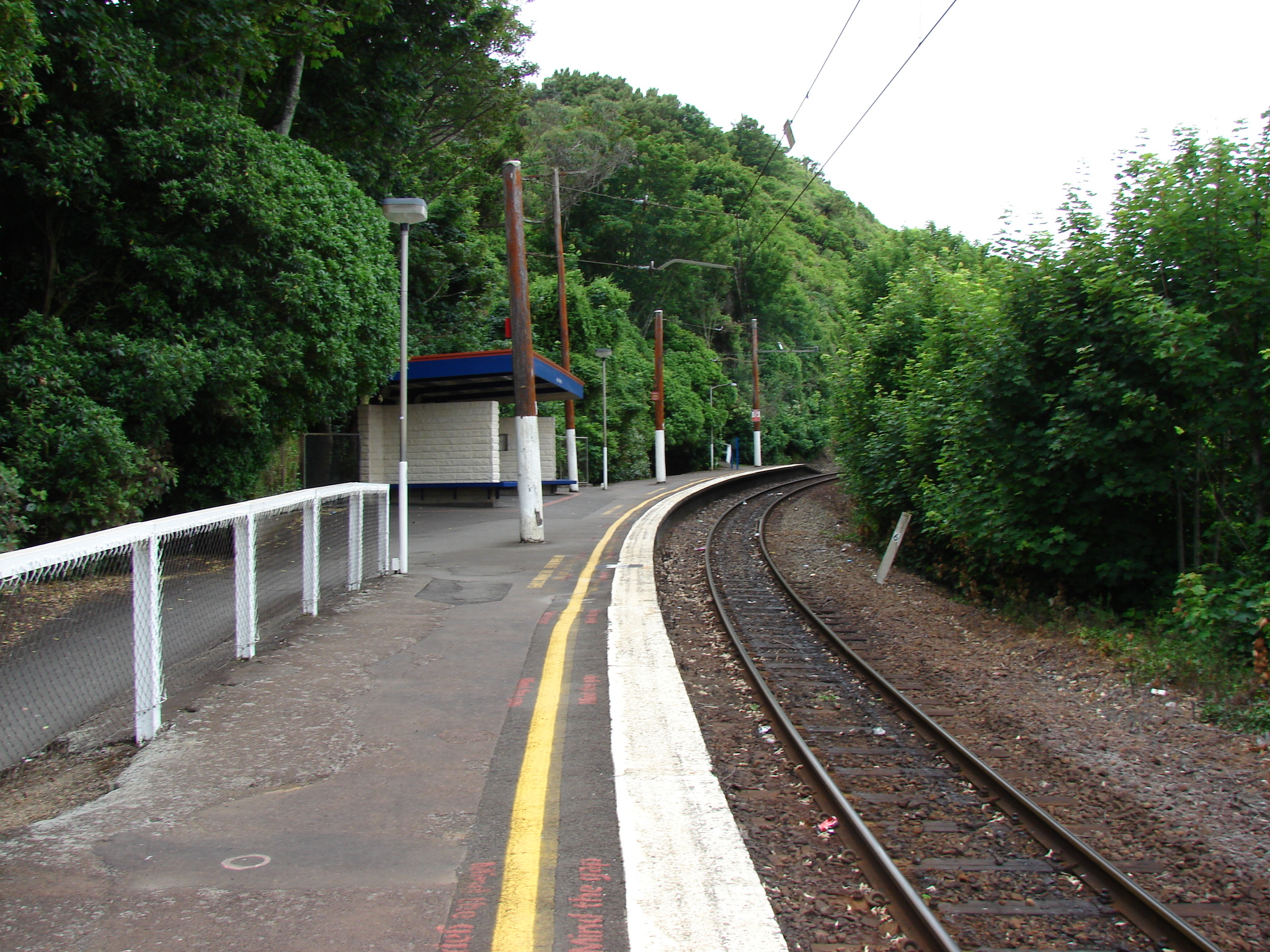

General information
- Location: Awarua Street, Ngaio, Wellington, New Zealand
- Coordinates: 41°14′47.31″S 174°46′27.27″E
- System: Metlink commuter rail
- Owner: Greater Wellington Regional Council
- Line: Johnsonville Line
- Platforms: Single side
- Tracks: Main line (1)
- Connections: Bus services

Construction
- Parking: No
- Cycle facilities: No

Other information
- Fare zone: 3

History
- Opened: 10 January 1938 (some steam trains); 2 July 1938 All trains (EMUs)
- Electrified: 2 July 1938

Services
Preceding station	Transdev Wellington	Following station
Simla Crescent towards Johnsonville	Johnsonville Line	Ngaio towards Wellington
Location

Awarua Street railway station is one of eight stations on the Johnsonville Branch, a branch railway north of Wellington in New Zealand’s North Island, and serves the suburb of Ngaio. It is one of two stations that were added to the line when it was upgraded prior to being reopened as the Johnsonville Branch. It is one of four stations on the line located on a curve.

Electric multiple unit trains are operated under the Metlink brand through this station in both directions to Johnsonville (to the north) and Wellington (to the south).

== History ==
As part of the upgrade of the section of the old Wellington and Manawatu Railway between Wellington and Johnsonville, two new stations were constructed, Awarua Street and Simla Crescent. The newly electrified Johnsonville Branch officially opened on 2 July 1938, with services to all stations from Monday 4 July. The two new stations had been used by some steam trains from 10 January 1938.

Over the summer of 2008/09, the platform of the station was entirely demolished to be replaced by a brand new platform that could accommodate six carriages, as opposed to four. The replaced platform is twice the length of the old platform.

== Services ==
Trains run in both directions through this station, departing at half-hourly intervals, supplemented by a 13/13/26 schedule at peak times on week days.

The closest bus route is #26, which passes by the end of Awarua Street along Ottawa Road.

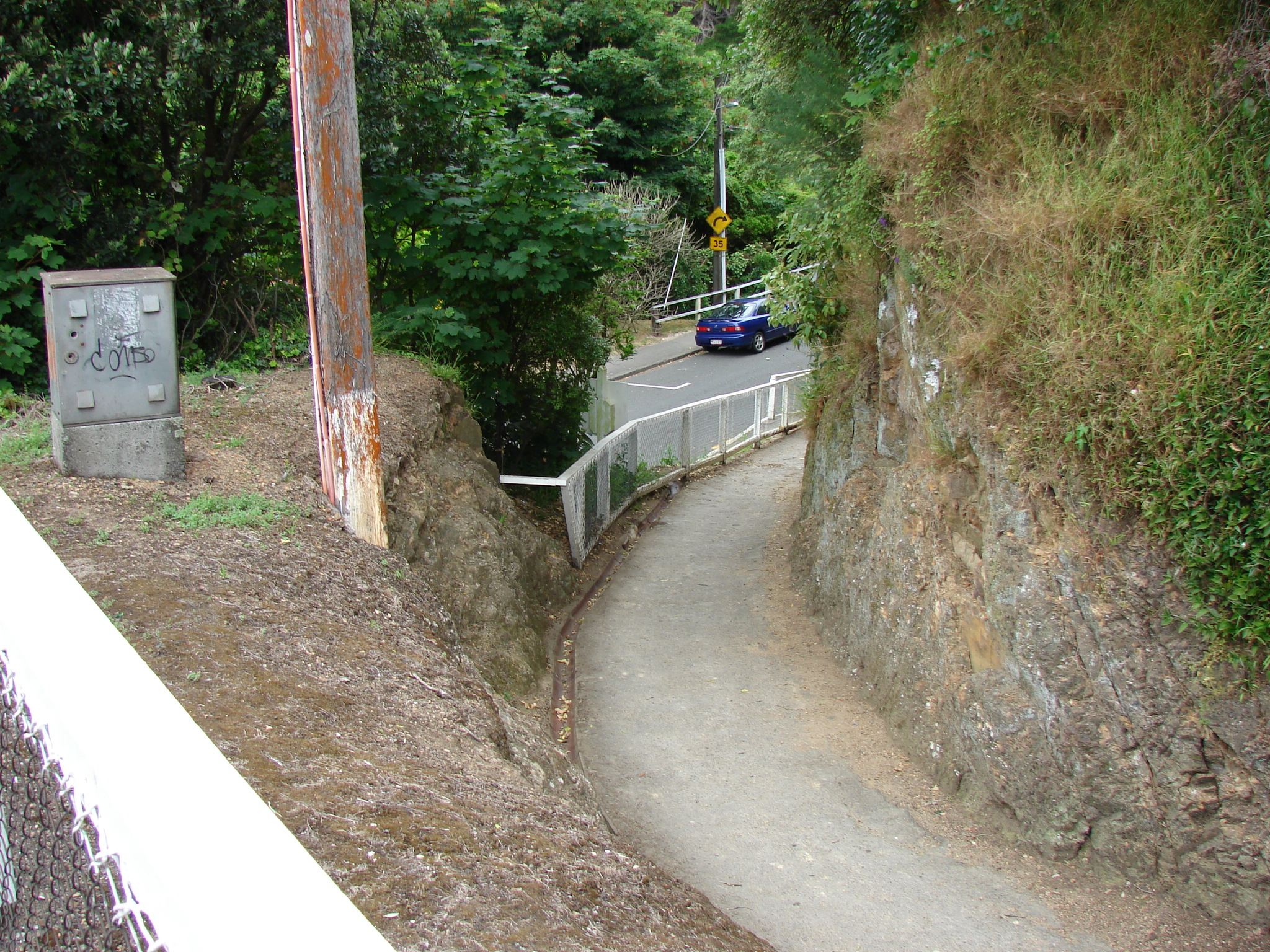
Pedestrian access from Awarua Street

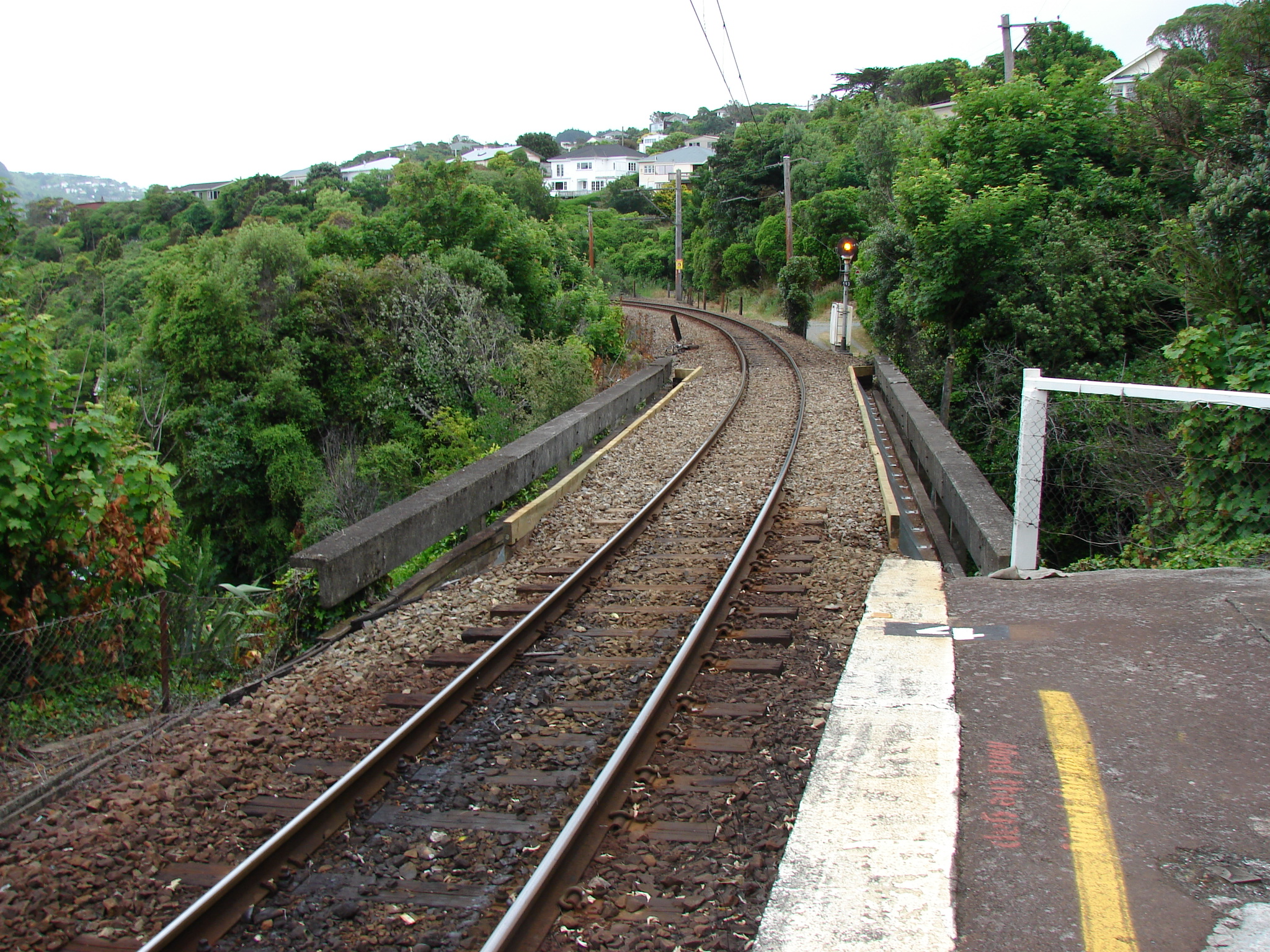
Rail overbridge at the southern end of the station

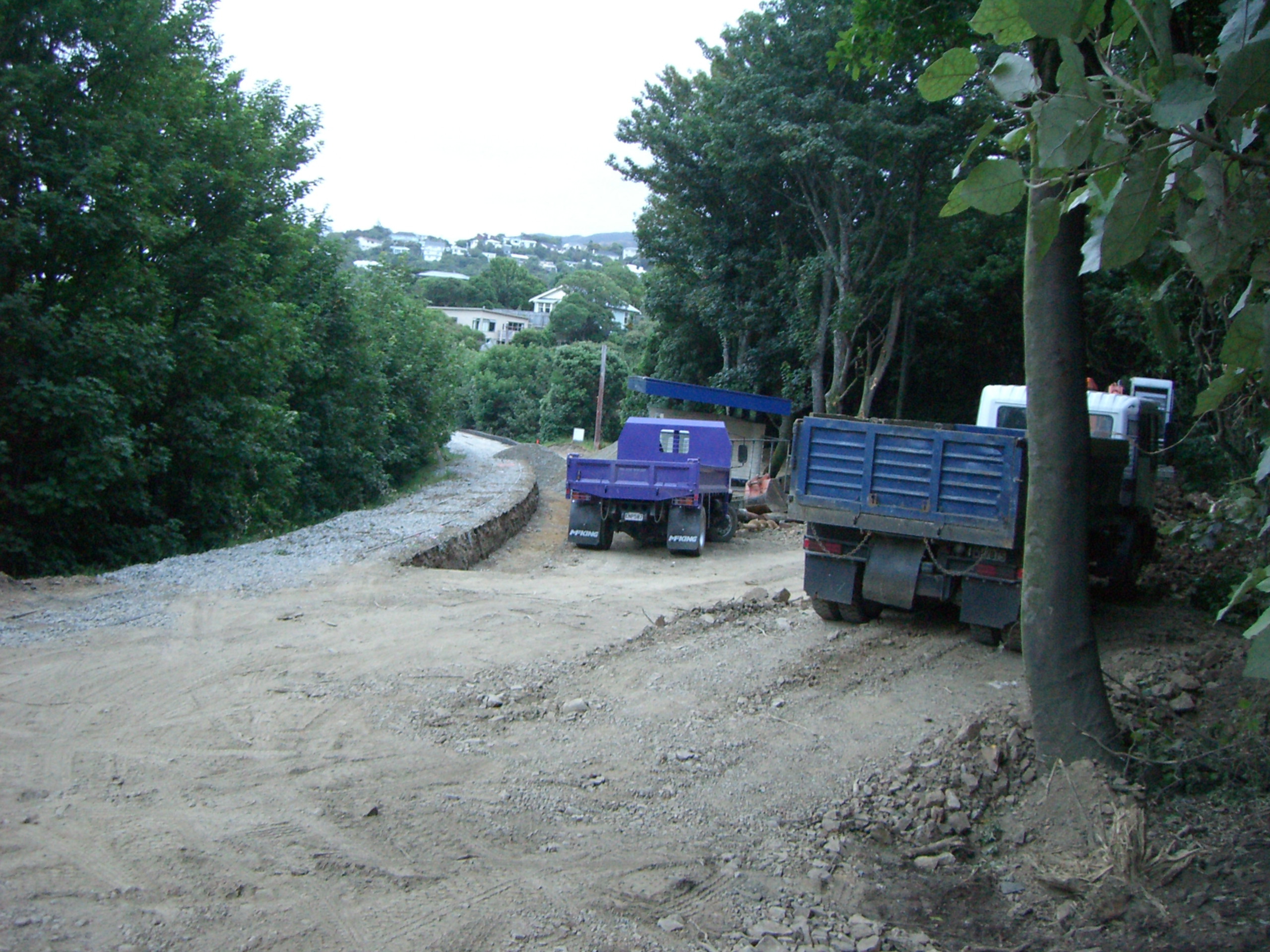
Awarua Street Station is entirely overhauled during maintenance to extend the platform to six carriage length, as seen from the northern end of the station

== Facilities ==
The station has a single side platform and passenger shelter. Pedestrian access to the station is via a walkway from Awarua Street near the rail bridge over Awarua Street, or from a long flight of steps down from Fox Street to the north end of the platform. There is no dedicated station car park available.
