= Redwood, Wellington =

Suburb of Wellington, New Zealand

Redwood
- Suburb
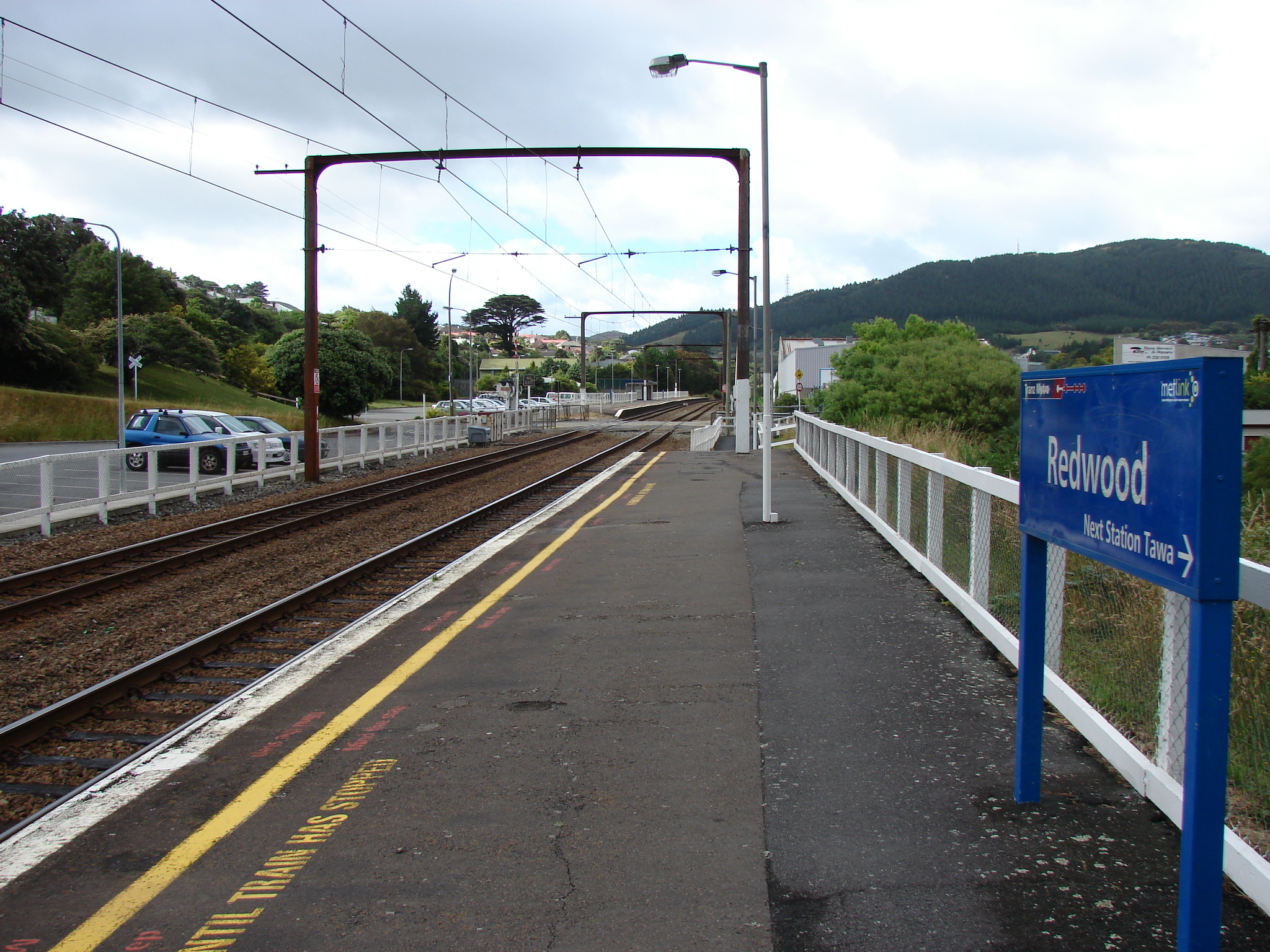
- Redwood railway station, looking south from the north-end (up) platform

- Coordinates: 41°10′37″S 174°49′23″E
- Country: New Zealand
- City: Wellington
- Local authority: Wellington City Council
- Electoral ward: Takapū/Northern Ward
- Community board: Tawa Community Board
- Established: 1960
- Railway stations: Redwood; Takapū Road

Tawa
Redwood
Churton Park	Grenada North

Redwood is a subdivision of Tawa, the northernmost suburb of Wellington, New Zealand. Redwood lies at the southern end of Tawa, to the west of the Tawa Main Road and the North Island Main Trunk Railway.

== Names and history ==
Redwood is named after the first Catholic Archbishop of Wellington, Francis Redwood, who was ordinary from 1874 until 1935 (bishop from 1874 and archbishop from 1887). It is located on 108 acres of land given in 1855 by Sir George Grey, Governor of New Zealand, to Philippe Viard, the first Roman Catholic Bishop of Wellington for the establishment of a school. The land was used for farming purposes until 1960 when Saint Francis Xavier School, a primary school, was opened. The remainder of the land became a housing subdivision named "Redwood" in honour of Archbishop Redwood. The Catholic connection is further highlighted in the Redwood area by several street names, including McKeefry Grove named after Cardinal McKeefry, third Archbishop of Wellington, and Lane Crescent, which commemorates Fr John Lane, a parish priest of the area.

Several streets in Redwood have names connected with Oxford and Cambridge University colleges, including Balliol Drive after Balliol College, Gonville Street after Gonville and Caius College, Oriel Avenue after Oriel College, and Achilles Close after the Achilles Club.

== Boundaries ==
Redwood is bounded by Larsen Crescent and the northern section of Redwood Avenue to the north, by the Main Road to the east, and Oriel Avenue and the southern section of Redwood Avenue to the south.

== Railway ==
Redwood is served by two railway stations, Takapu Road Railway Station in the south of Redwood and Redwood Railway Station in the north of Redwood. Travel times to Wellington by train are twelve minutes from Takapu Road and fourteen minutes from Redwood. Travel times to Porirua are nine minutes from Takapu Road and seven minutes from Redwood. There is a sixteen-minute service during peak periods and thirty minutes at other times.

The Railway line through southern Tawa was originally built on a different route slightly further east by the Wellington and Manawatu Railway Company. It followed a gradient on the contour of the hills from Takapu Road to Duncan Street below the present day Taylor Terrace. The Wellington to Paremata section opened on 24 September 1885 without stations in the Redwood area. The railway line was incorporated into the New Zealand Railways Department network in December 1908.

The station at Takapu Road opened on 19 June 1937, the same day as the new railway station in Wellington, when the present-day route on the Tawa Flat deviation was opened for passenger traffic and the Johnsonville to Tawa section of the older, more circuitous, railway route from Wellington through Johnsonville closed. Redwood Railway Station opened on 15 December 1963 to meet increased demand for passenger services in south Tawa following the development of the Redwood and Taylor Terrace subdivisions.

== Education ==
Redwood School is a coeducational state contributing primary school, for Year 1 to 6 students, established in 1966. It has a decile rating of 10 and a roll of 350 as of November 2024.

St Francis Xavier Schoolis a coeducational integrated Catholic contributing primary school, for year 1 to 6 students, established in 1960. It has a decile rating of 9 and a roll of 165.
