= Ngaio railway station =

New Zealand railway station

Ngaio
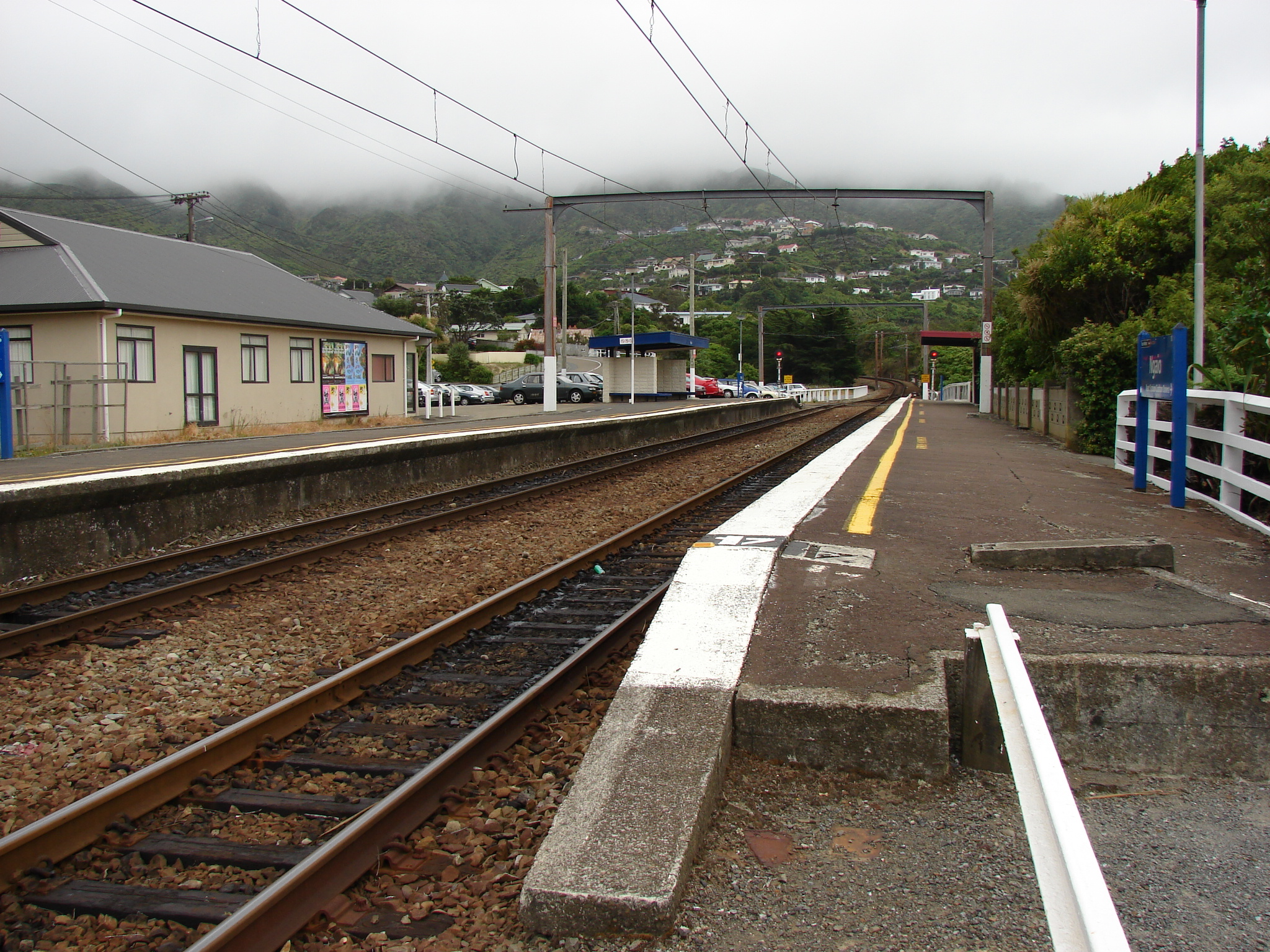
- Ngaio railway station, looking North (2008).

General information
- Location: Collingwood Street, Ngaio, Wellington, New Zealand
- Coordinates: 41°15′3.53″S 174°46′18.58″E
- System: Metlink commuter rail
- Owner: Greater Wellington Regional Council
- Line: Johnsonville Line
- Platforms: Dual side
- Tracks: Main line (1); Crossing loop (1)
- Connections: Bus services

Construction
- Parking: 25 spaces

Other information
- Fare zone: 3

History
- Opened: 21 September 1885
- Closed: 1 September 1964 (freight)
- Rebuilt: 1967, c2010
- Electrified: 2 July 1938
- Former names: Crofton

Services
Preceding station	Transdev Wellington	Following station
Awarua Street towards Johnsonville	Johnsonville Line	Crofton Downs towards Wellington
Location

Ngaio railway station is one of eight railway stations on the Johnsonville Branch, a commuter branch railway north of Wellington in New Zealand's North Island, and serves the suburb of Ngaio. The station was erected and operated by the Wellington and Manawatu Railway Company (WMR) on their line from Wellington to Longburn. The area served by this station used to be called Crofton, until the suburb was renamed to Ngaio in 1908 to avoid confusion with Crofton, a suburb of Marton in the Manawatu. From the acquisition of the WMR by the New Zealand Railways Department in 1908 until the opening of the Tawa Flat deviation in 1937, the station was on the North Island Main Trunk railway. On 2 July 1938, the truncated section of the line to Johnsonville became the Johnsonville Branch.

Matangi electric multiple unit trains are operated under the Metlink brand through this station in both directions to Johnsonville (to the north) and Wellington (to the south).

== History ==
Ngaio was one of three stations constructed by the Wellington and Manawatu Railway Company on what is now known as the Johnsonville Branch. It was opened on 21 September 1885 along with the first section of the company’s line between Wellington and Paramata. Timetabled services began several days later on the 24th.

The station originally only had a single side platform, with the present-day second side platform and shelter being added at a later date. The points were manually controlled from a signal box at the southern end of the station into the 1960s, with this being one of the last such sections of the line before complete automation.

In 2009, the loop was lengthened towards Wellington and the southbound platform was replaced and extended. Then the northbound platform was replaced and extended to enable the new Matangi EMUs to be used on the line. Other upgrades included new platform lighting, seating, and signage.

== Operation ==
Passenger trains cross at this station as the Up-train platform is on a crossing loop. Runaway sidings are located at both the southern and northern ends of the station for Down and Up trains (respectively). Colour light signals are also located at both ends of the platforms.

== Services ==
Trains run in both directions through this station, departing at half-hourly intervals, supplemented by a 13/13/26 schedule at peak times on week days.

The #26 bus route passes close by this station, along Ottawa Road and Crofton Road, at the end of Waikowhai Street.

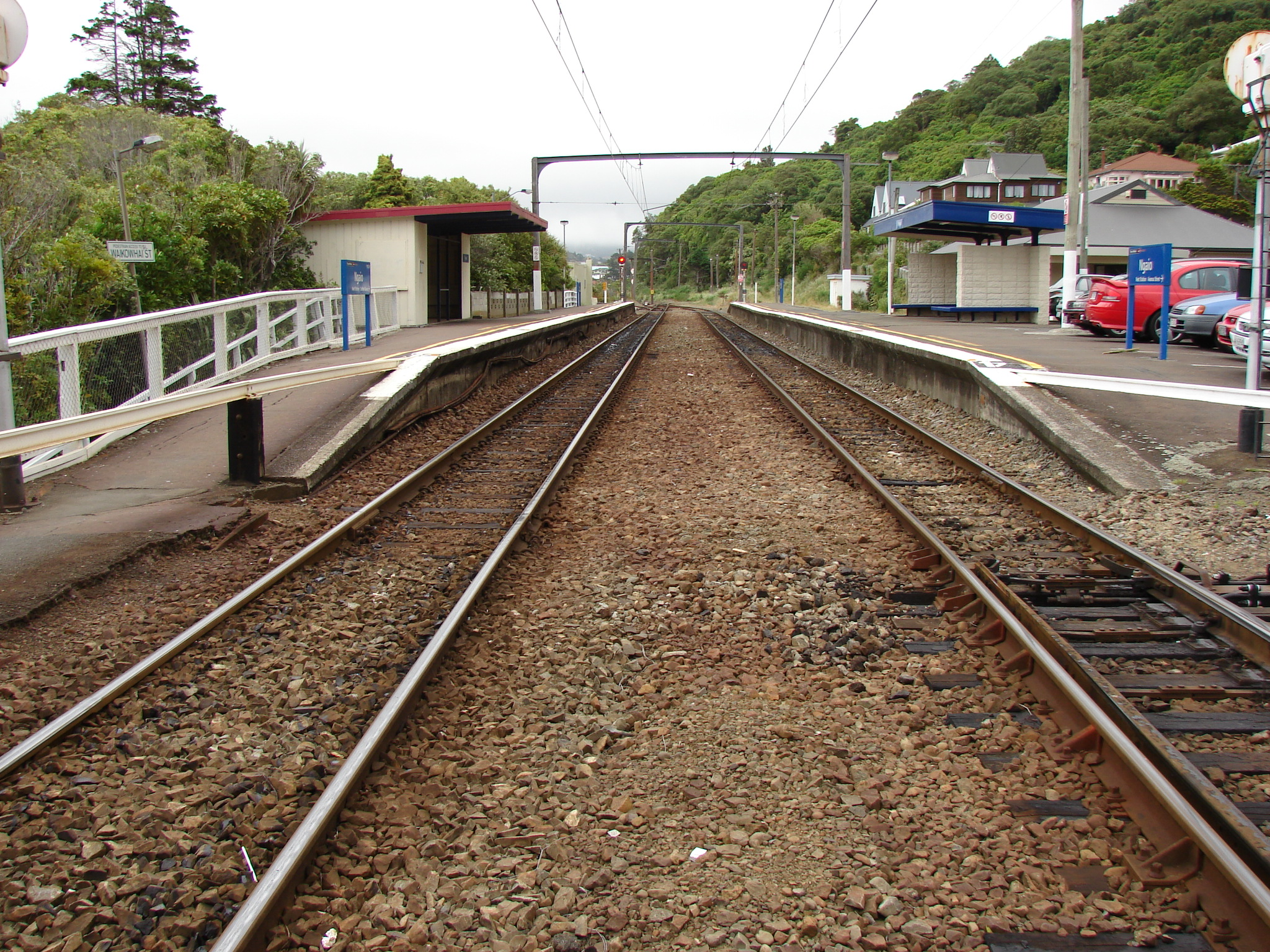
Ngaio railway station, looking south in the direction of Crofton Downs station

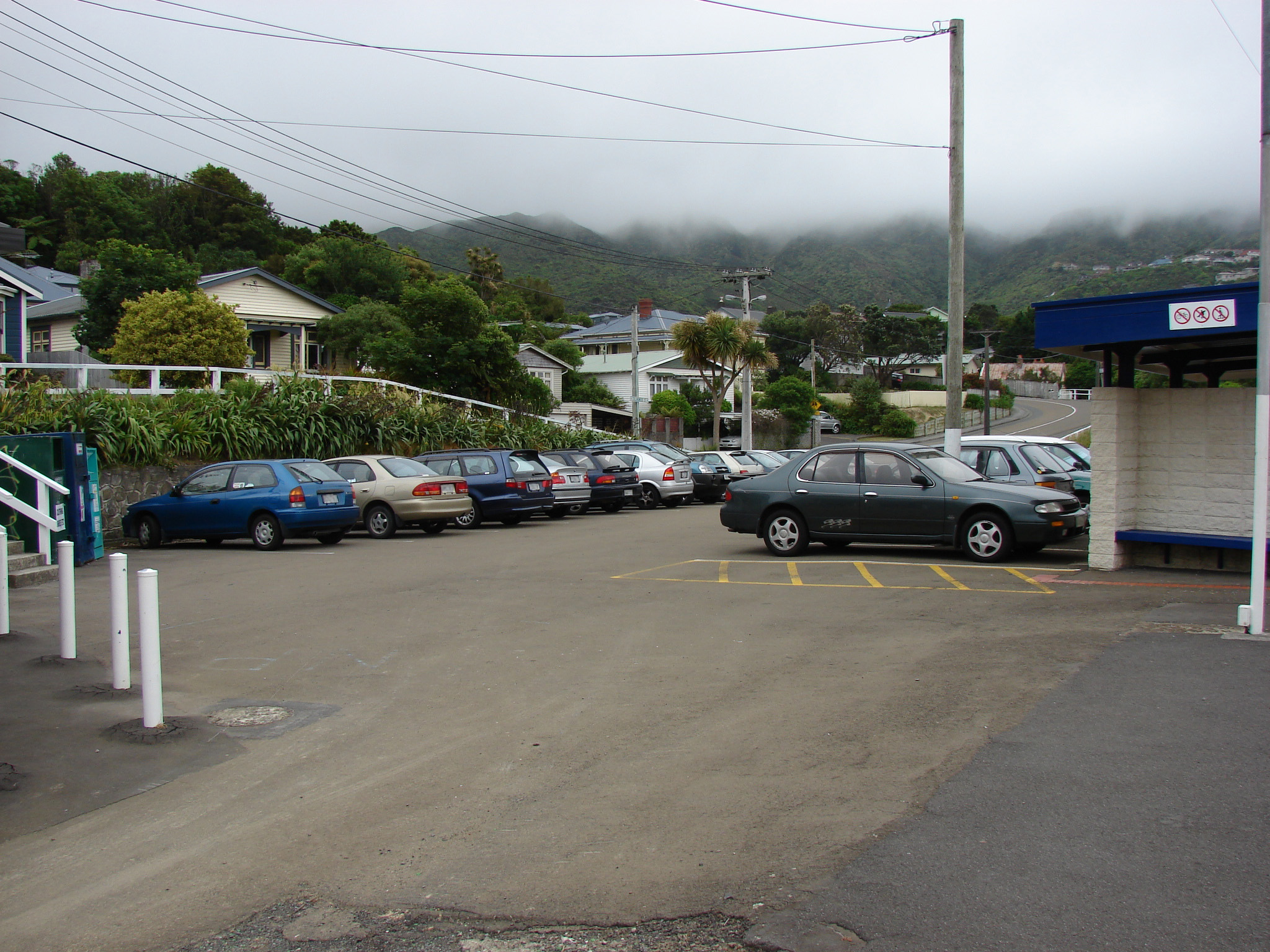
Part of the Ngaio railway station car park

== Facilities ==
This station has dual side platforms with a passenger shelter on each. Access between the platforms is by way of at-grade pedestrian level crossings at one end of the platforms, the former access at both ends being removed during the recent extension of platform lengths. There is pedestrian access to Waikowhai Street from the Down train platform, and a car park off Collingwood Street, behind the Up train platform.
