= Simla Crescent railway station =

New Zealand railway station

Simla Crescent
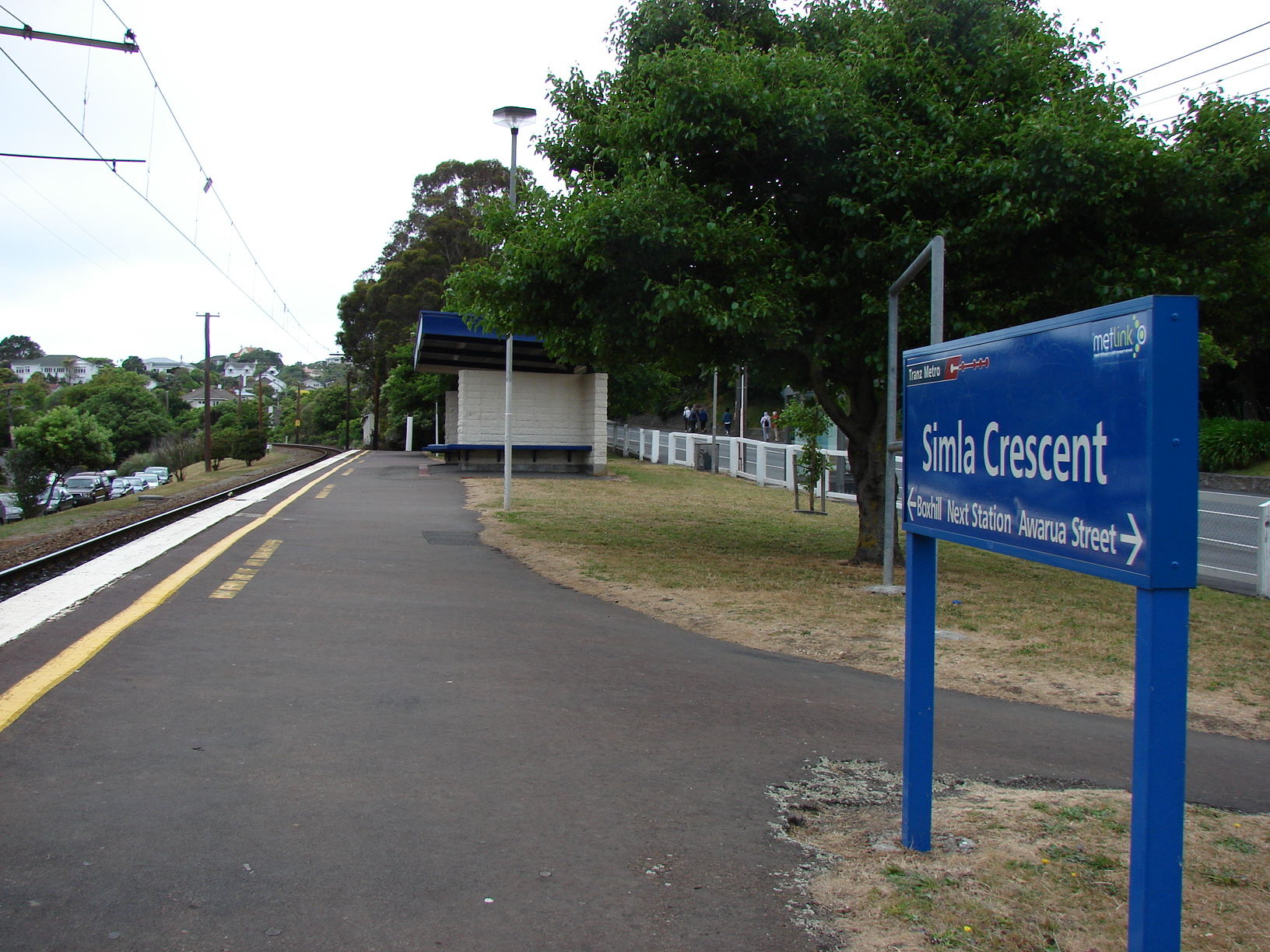

General information
- Location: Khandallah Road, Khandallah, Wellington, New Zealand
- Coordinates: 41°14′48.63″S 174°47′3.33″E
- System: Metlink commuter rail
- Owner: Greater Wellington Regional Council
- Line: Johnsonville Line
- Platforms: Single side
- Tracks: Main line (1)
- Connections: Bus services

Construction
- Parking: No
- Cycle facilities: No

Other information
- Fare zone: 3

History
- Opened: 10 January 1938 (some steam trains only); 2 July 1938 All trains (EMUs)
- Electrified: 2 July 1938

Services
Preceding station	Transdev Wellington	Following station
Box Hill towards Johnsonville	Johnsonville Line	Awarua Street towards Wellington
Track layout
Location

Simla Crescent railway station is one of eight stations on the Johnsonville Branch, a branch railway north of Wellington in New Zealand’s North Island, and is one of two stations that were added to the line when it was upgraded prior to being reopened as the Johnsonville Branch. It serves the suburbs of Ngaio and Khandallah.

Electric multiple unit trains are operated under the Metlink brand through this station in both directions to Johnsonville (to the north) and Wellington (to the south).

== History ==
As part of the upgrade of the section of the old Wellington and Manawatu Railway between Wellington and Johnsonville, two new stations were constructed, Simla Crescent and Awarua Street. The newly electrified Johnsonville Branch officially opened with a ceremony on 2 July 1938, and for all trains from Monday 4 July, although the two new stations had been used by some steam trains from 10 January 1938.

== Services ==
Trains run in both directions through this station, departing at half-hourly intervals, supplemented by additional services (giving a 13-minute interval between trains) at peak times on week days.

The nearest bus routes are #25 and #26 at the corner of Cockayne Road and Clutha Avenue.

There is a bus stop (No 5435) with shelter in Khandallah Road behind the station, for buses replacing trains only.

== Facilities ==
This station has a single side platform and passenger shelter. Pedestrian access is from Khandallah Road or Simla Crescent. There is no dedicated station car park, although there are several car parks in the cul-de-sac off Simla Crescent and below the line on the opposite side to the station.

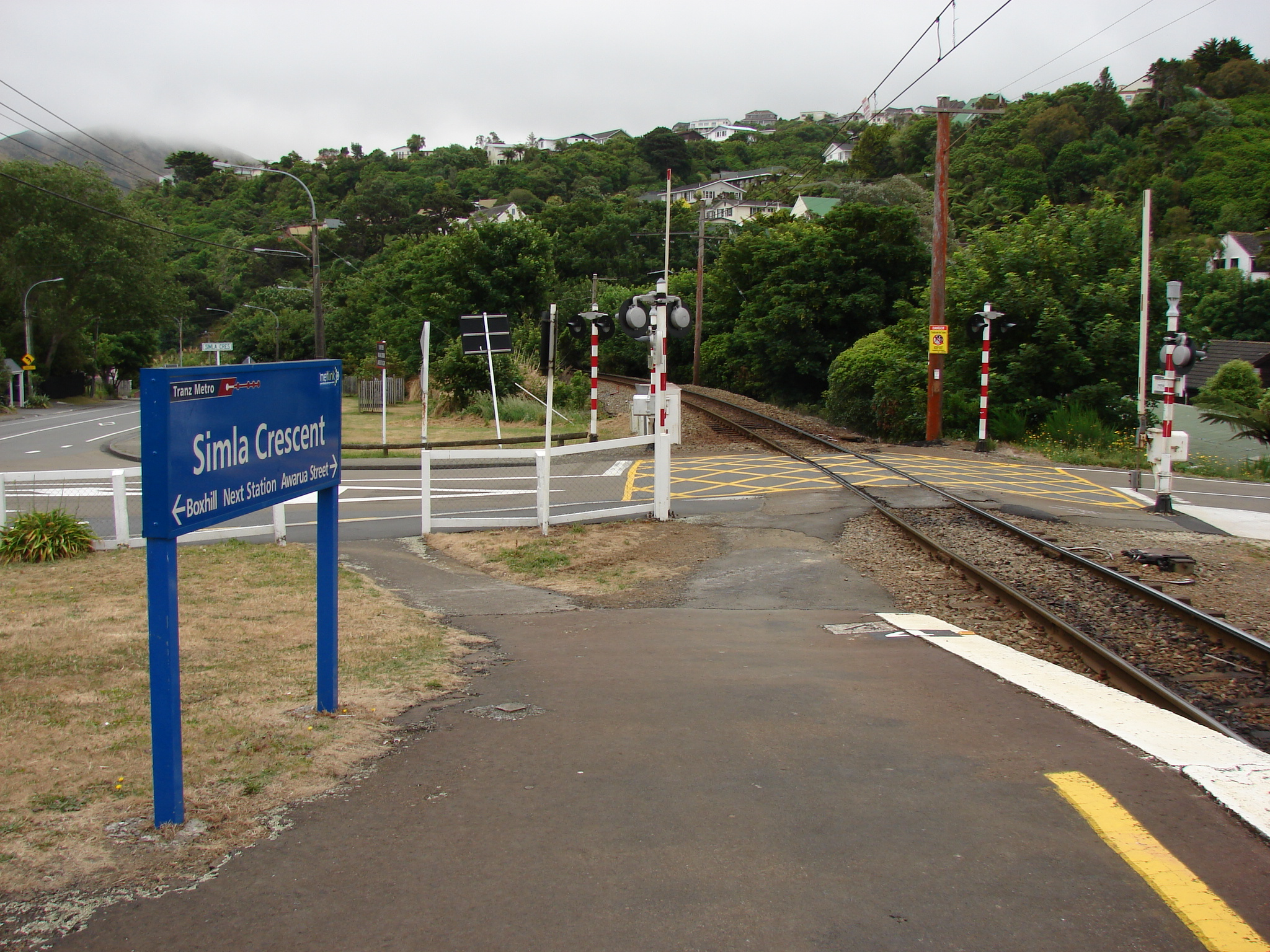
Simla Crescent level crossing at the southern end of Simla Crescent railway station.
