= Takapu Road railway station =

Railway station in New Zealand

Takapu Road
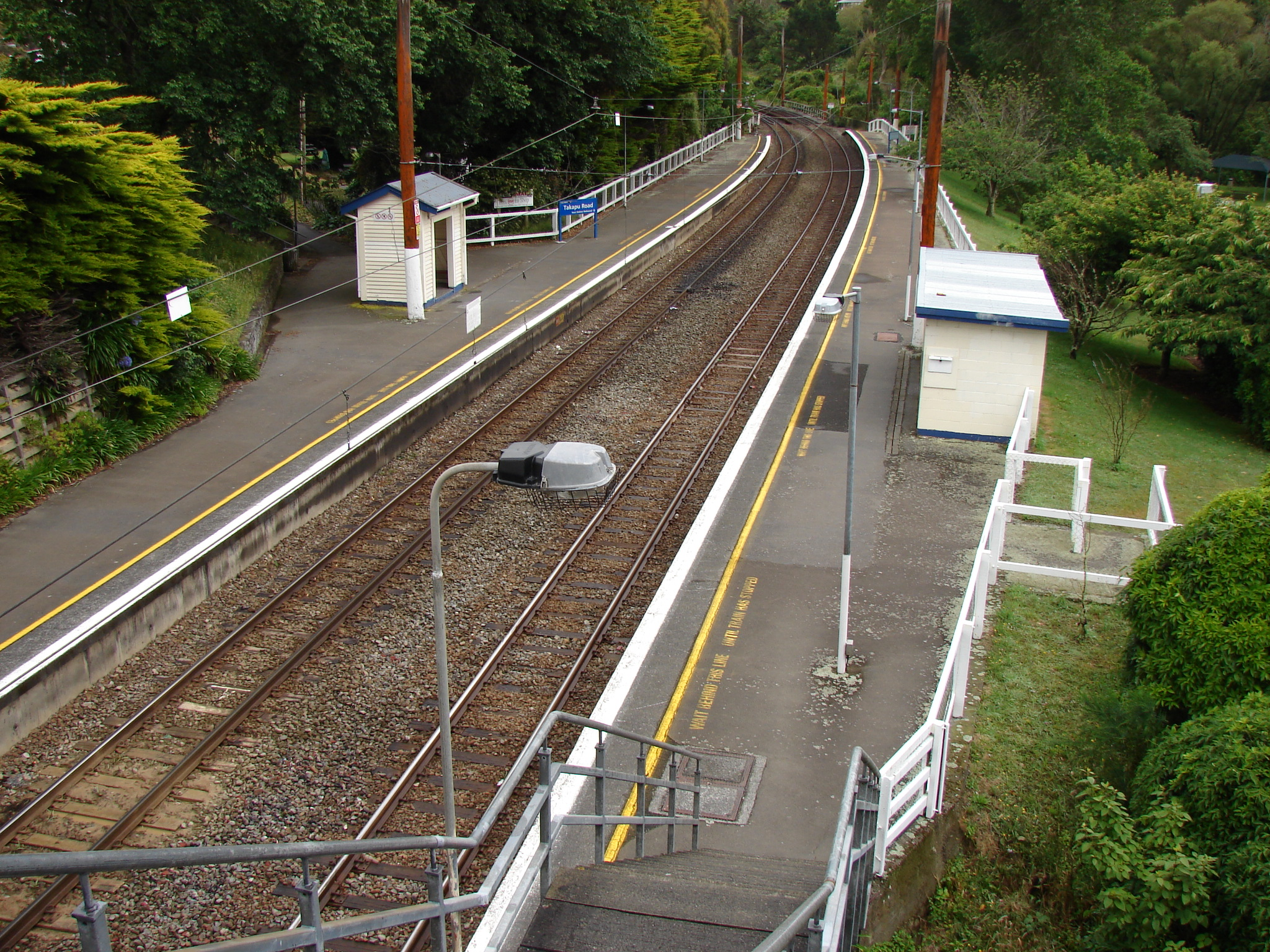

General information
- Location: Boscobel Lane, Tawa, Wellington, New Zealand
- Coordinates: 41°11′6.94″S 174°49′41.63″E
- System: Metlink suburban rail
- Owner: Greater Wellington Regional Council
- Line: North Island Main Trunk
- Platforms: Dual side
- Tracks: Mainline (2)

Construction
- Parking: Yes

History
- Opened: 19 June 1937
- Electrified: 24 July 1940

Services
Preceding station	Transdev Wellington	Following station
Redwood towards Waikanae	Kāpiti Line	Wellington Terminus
Location

Takapu Road railway station is on the suburban rail network of Wellington, New Zealand, on the Kapiti section of the North Island Main Trunk Railway (NIMT). It is double tracked with side platforms. It serves the suburbs of Redwood and Grenada North, and the rural Takapu Valley.

== Services ==
Takapu Road is served by Kāpiti Line commuter trains operated by Transdev Wellington under the Metlink brand operating between Wellington and Porirua or Waikanae. Services are operated by electric multiple units of the FT/FP class (Matangi). Two diesel-hauled carriage trains, the Capital Connection and the Northern Explorer, both pass through the station but do not stop.

Off-peak trains stop at all stations between Wellington and Waikanae. During peak periods, trains from Wellington that stop at all stations may terminate at Porirua or Plimmerton and return to Wellington while a number of peak services run express between Wellington and Porirua and thus do not stop at Takapu Road.

Travel times by train are twelve minutes to Wellington, nine minutes to Porirua, and forty-eight minutes to Waikanae.

Trains run every twenty minutes during daytime off-peak hours, more frequently during peak periods, and less frequently at night. Before July 2018, off-peak passenger train services between Wellington and Waikanae stopping at Takapu Road ran every thirty minutes but were increased to one every twenty minutes from 15 July 2018.

In October 2014, Metlink announced that a further 60 "Park and Ride" parking places would be available at the station during the week.

== History ==
Takapu Road is one of only three stations on the Kāpiti Line not on track built by the Wellington and Manawatu Railway Company (WMR); the other two are Redwood immediately to the north, and Tawa adjacent to the original WMR built station. The WMR built the original route of the NIMT between Wellington and Longburn and it was purchased by the New Zealand Railways Department (NZR) in December 1908. The original route between Wellington and Porirua, via Johnsonville and now truncated to the Johnsonville Line, was bypassed in the 1930s by the Tawa Flat deviation. Takapu Road is on the northern section of this deviation. The deviation opened for freight traffic on 24 July 1935 but Takapu Road did not open until passenger services began on 19 June 1937. The line was electrified in June 1940.

According to Hoy:

Takapu Road station was built on private land. The station, and the fact that all but a few suburban trains would stop there, was part of the agreement of passing through. It is only in recent years that extra passengers have begun using the station as more homes are built in the district.

The original passenger shelters at Takapu station were replaced with new shelters in the year ending June 2015.
