= Redwood railway station =

Railway station in New Zealand

Redwood
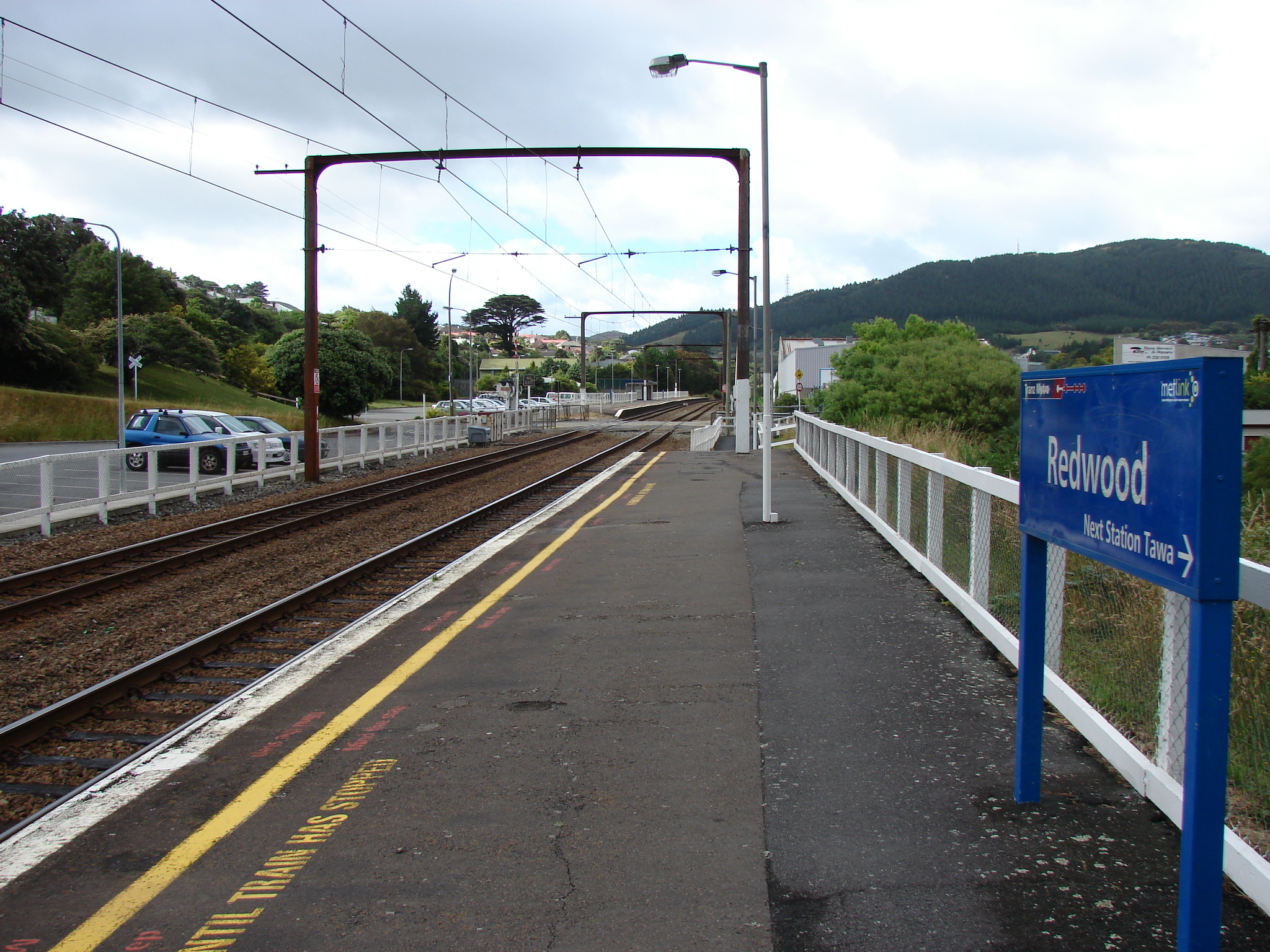
- Redwood railway station, looking south from the northern (up) platform.

General information
- Location: Tawa Street, Redwood, Wellington, New Zealand
- Coordinates: 41°10.454′S 174°49.629′E
- System: Metlink suburban rail
- Owner: Greater Wellington Regional Council
- Line: North Island Main Trunk
- Platforms: Dual side, staggered
- Tracks: Mainline (2)

Construction
- Parking: Yes

History
- Opened: 15 December 1963
- Electrified: 24 July 1940

Services
Preceding station	Transdev Wellington	Following station
Tawa towards Waikanae	Kāpiti Line	Takapu Road towards Wellington
Location

Redwood railway station on the suburban rail network of Wellington, New Zealand, is on the North Island Main Trunk Railway (NIMT). Opening in late 1963, it is double tracked with staggered side platforms; the up platform (north, towards Waikanae) is on the north side of the Tawa Street level crossing, the down platform (towards Wellington) on the south. The station serves the suburb of Redwood.

== Services ==
Redwood is served by Kāpiti Line commuter trains operated by Transdev Wellington under the Metlink brand operating between Wellington and Porirua or Waikanae. Services are operated by electric multiple units of the FT/FP class (Matangi). Two diesel-hauled carriage trains, the Capital Connection and the Northern Explorer, pass through the station but do not stop.

Off-peak trains stop at all stations between Wellington and Waikanae. During peak periods, trains from Wellington that stop at all stations may terminate at Porirua or Plimmerton and return to Wellington while a number of peak services run express between Wellington and Porirua and thus do not stop at Redwood.

Travel times by train are fourteen minutes to Wellington, seven minutes to Porirua, and forty-six minutes to Waikanae.

Trains run every twenty minutes during daytime off-peak hours, more frequently during peak periods, and less frequently at night. Before July 2018, off-peak passenger train services between Wellington and Waikanae stopping at Redwood ran every thirty minutes but were increased to one every twenty minutes from 15 July 2018.

=== Temporary closure ===
The station was closed for about four months, from 8 February to 3 May 2010, and renovated at a cost in excess of $1 million. New passenger shelters were constructed, and both platforms were demolished and completely rebuilt as higher, 170 metre long, platforms.

== History ==
Redwood is one of only two stations on the Paraparaumu Line not on track built by the Wellington and Manawatu Railway Company (WMR); the other is Takapu Road to the south. The WMR built the original route of the NIMT between Wellington and Longburn and it was purchased by the New Zealand Railways Department in December 1908. The original route between Wellington and Porirua via Johnsonville, now truncated to the Johnsonville Line, was bypassed in the 1930s by the Tawa Flat deviation. Redwood is on the northern section of this deviation. The deviation opened for freight on 24 July 1935, for passengers on 19 June 1937, and was electrified in June 1940, but Redwood did not open until 15 December 1963. The northbound Redwood platform is close to the location of the first Tawa railway station which was located on what is now Duncan Street north of the junction of Tawa and Duncan Streets, from 1885 to 1937.

In the late 1950s and early 1960s, with housing development on Taylor Terrace south of Tawa Street and in the new Redwood subdivision to the southwest, there was a need for an additional railway station between Takapu Road and Tawa. The Tawa Street location was chosen as it had street access and there was room to provide car parks. The platforms were staggered north and south of Tawa Street to avoid the excessive operation of the flashing lights and bells and barrier arms at the Tawa Street Level Crossing (so that the train would not keep the warnings operating when stopped at the station, as the train would resume travel away from the crossing).

The crossing has vehicle half-arm barriers, but pedestrians and cyclists tended to ignore the warnings and could cross into the path of a second train. In 2018 the installation of four gates which automatically locked when the alarms were actuated was approved, at a cost of $900,000 (see CCTV photo of child cyclist ignoring warnings). The automatic pedestrian gates were opened in October 2018.
