= Tawa railway station =

Railway station in New Zealand

Tawa
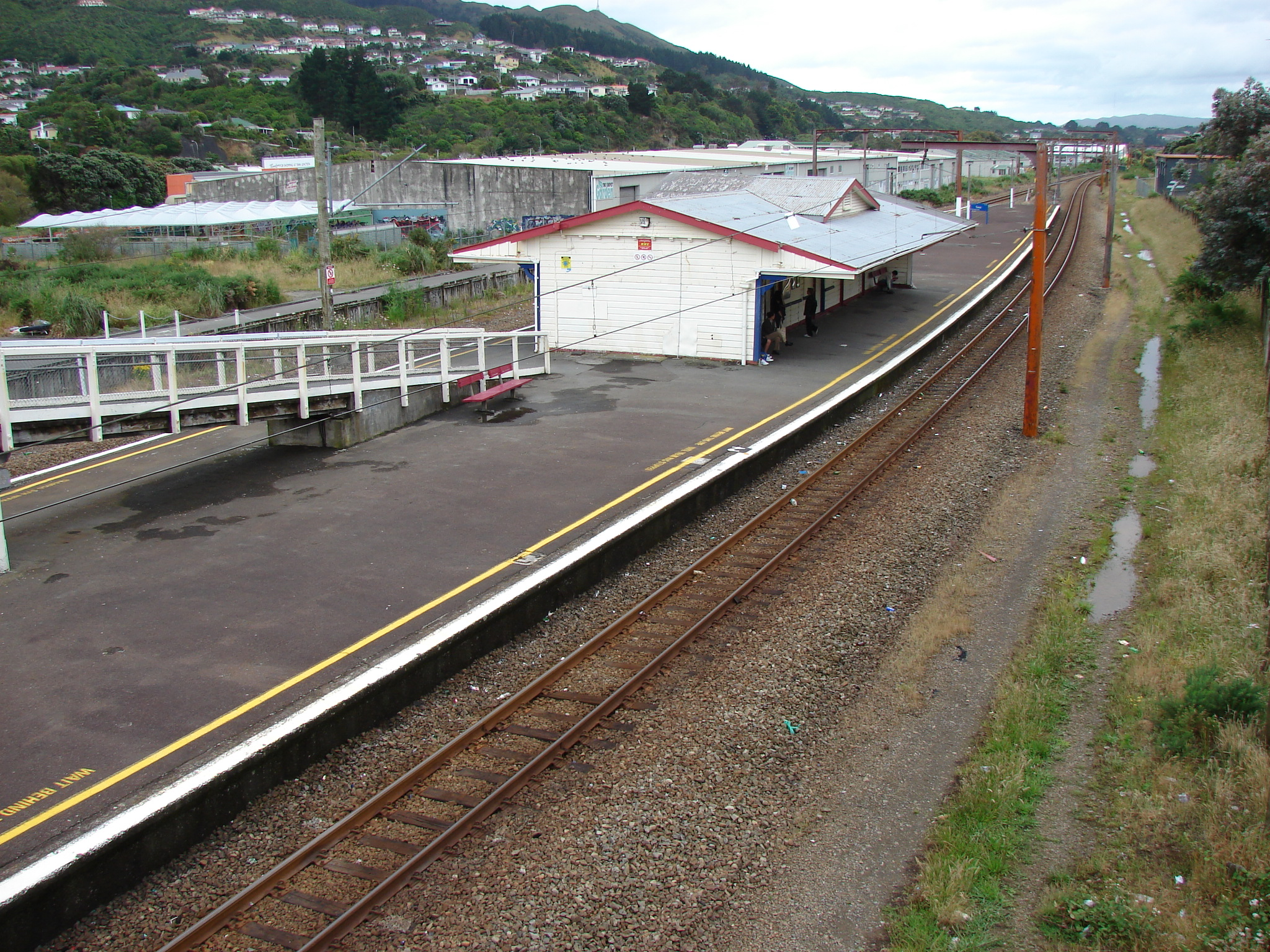
- 1937–2013 station building

General information
- Location: Melville Street, Tawa, Wellington, New Zealand
- Coordinates: 41°10′9.48″S 174°49′42.20″E
- System: Metlink suburban rail
- Owner: Greater Wellington Regional Council (buildings); KiwiRail (platform, track
- Line: North Island Main Trunk
- Platforms: Island
- Tracks: Mainline (2)

Construction
- Parking: Yes

History
- Opened: 21 Sept 1885 (WMR as Tawa Flat) relocated 24 July 1935 (freight); 19 June 1937 (passenger)
- Rebuilt: 1937, 2013
- Electrified: 24 July 1940
- Former names: Tawa Flat

Services
Preceding station	Transdev Wellington	Following station
Linden towards Waikanae	Kāpiti Line	Redwood towards Wellington
Location

Tawa railway station, originally called Tawa Flat, is on the North Island Main Trunk Railway (NIMT) and is part of the suburban rail network of Wellington, New Zealand. It is double tracked with an island platform, and is 13.75 kilometres (8.54 mi) from Wellington railway station, the southern terminus of the NIMT. The station serves the suburb of Tawa.

== Services ==
Tawa is served by Kāpiti Line commuter trains operated by Transdev Wellington under the Metlink brand operating between Wellington and Porirua or Waikanae. Services are operated by electric multiple units of the FT/FP class (Matangi).

Off-peak trains stop at all stations between Wellington and Waikanae. During peak periods, trains from Wellington that stop at all stations may terminate at Porirua or Plimmerton and return to Wellington while a number of peak services run express between Wellington and Porirua and thus do not stop at Tawa.

Travel times by train are fifteen minutes to Wellington, six minutes to Porirua, and forty-five minutes to Waikanae.

Trains run every twenty minutes during daytime off-peak hours, more frequently during peak periods, and less frequently at night. Before July 2018, off-peak passenger train services between Wellington and Waikanae stopping at Tawa ran every thirty minutes but were increased to one every twenty minutes from 15 July 2018.

== History ==
Tawa Flat railway station was renamed Tawa railway station on 23 February 1959 in conjunction with the change of name of the Borough of Tawa Flat to the Borough of Tawa. The area that had previously been known as Tawa Flat then became known as Tawa.

The original line through Tawa was built by the Wellington and Manawatu Railway Company (WMR) and the station opened on 24 September 1885. At this time, the railway followed a circuitous route via Johnsonville to reach Wellington and Tawa was 16.48 kilometres (10.24 mi) from the terminus. The original station was a flag stop at which trains would only stop if signalled to do so by passengers wishing to board or alight. It was located on what is now Duncan Street north of the junction of Duncan Street and Tawa Street and close to and above the present northbound Redwood railway station.

=== Train crossing ===
Arthur Leigh Hunt was employed from the WMR from 1892 to 1897, advancing from office boy at Thorndon to stationmaster. When he was a ticket clerk on the mail train coming south on a wild night with a "southerly" he was instructed at Paekakariki to cross with a special train at Tawa. The Tawa Flat station had only one "dead end" siding which was too short for either train. So the south-bound train was split into A and C, the front and rear halves. The north-bound train was designated B and the following shunts were required:

- A goes forward and reverses into siding
- B proceeds forward along main line clear of points to C
- A proceeds onto main line clear of the points by the length of B plus C
- B places C into siding, then backs to main line and proceeds on its way
- A backs into siding, couples onto C, and then proceeds on its way

=== Incorporation into NZR ===
The WMR was purchased and incorporated into the network of the New Zealand Railways Department in December 1908. In June 1909, the government approved £500 to upgrade the station.

=== Tawa Flat Deviation ===
In the 1930s, the original WMR route from Wellington to Tawa was truncated at Johnsonville as the Johnsonville Branch and bypassed by the Tawa Flat deviation. This deviation offered a quicker route to Wellington; it was 3 km shorter, avoided the steep grades and sharp curvature of the Johnsonville route, and rejoined the original route north of the new Tawa station. The new deviation was built on the floor of the valley below the level of the old railway requiring the construction of a new railway yard, island station platform, and a new station building at Tawa. The old station building was used as an addition to a local church.

Freight services began using the deviation from 24 July 1935 and passenger services on 19 June 1937. On the latter date, the connection between Tawa and Johnsonville was severed and the double track deviation and the new station entered service allowing shorter journey times and a more intensive timetable. The line through Tawa was electrified in June 1940, and on 15 December 1957, the single track north of Tawa was duplicated as far as Porirua.

== Replacement of station building ==
In 2012, the station building was found to have a 10 cm lean and to be in poor condition due to major water leaks in the roof affecting the structure. The building was closed after an inspection in January while the work needed to repair or replace the building was assessed.

The Greater Wellington Regional Council decided to replace the station building in June 2012, at an estimated cost of about $600,000 for erecting a new shelter in three months. The existing building would require earthquake strengthening and replacement of 80% of the structure, costing possibly $2 million and taking 18 months.

Tawa Station closed from 26 December 2012 to 20 May 2013 for replacing the station building and upgrading the platform and pedestrian overbridge. A shuttle bus service from the Tawa Junction temporary car park to an adjacent station, and a Rail Replacement Bus Stop on Duncan Street were provided. The pedestrian overbridge remained open, apart from short term closures. The new station building opened on 20 May 2013. The new building has a series of decorative panels of the station history.
