= Tawa Flat deviation =

Section of railway line in Wellington, New Zealand

Coordinates: 41°10′40.1″S 174°49′35.99″E

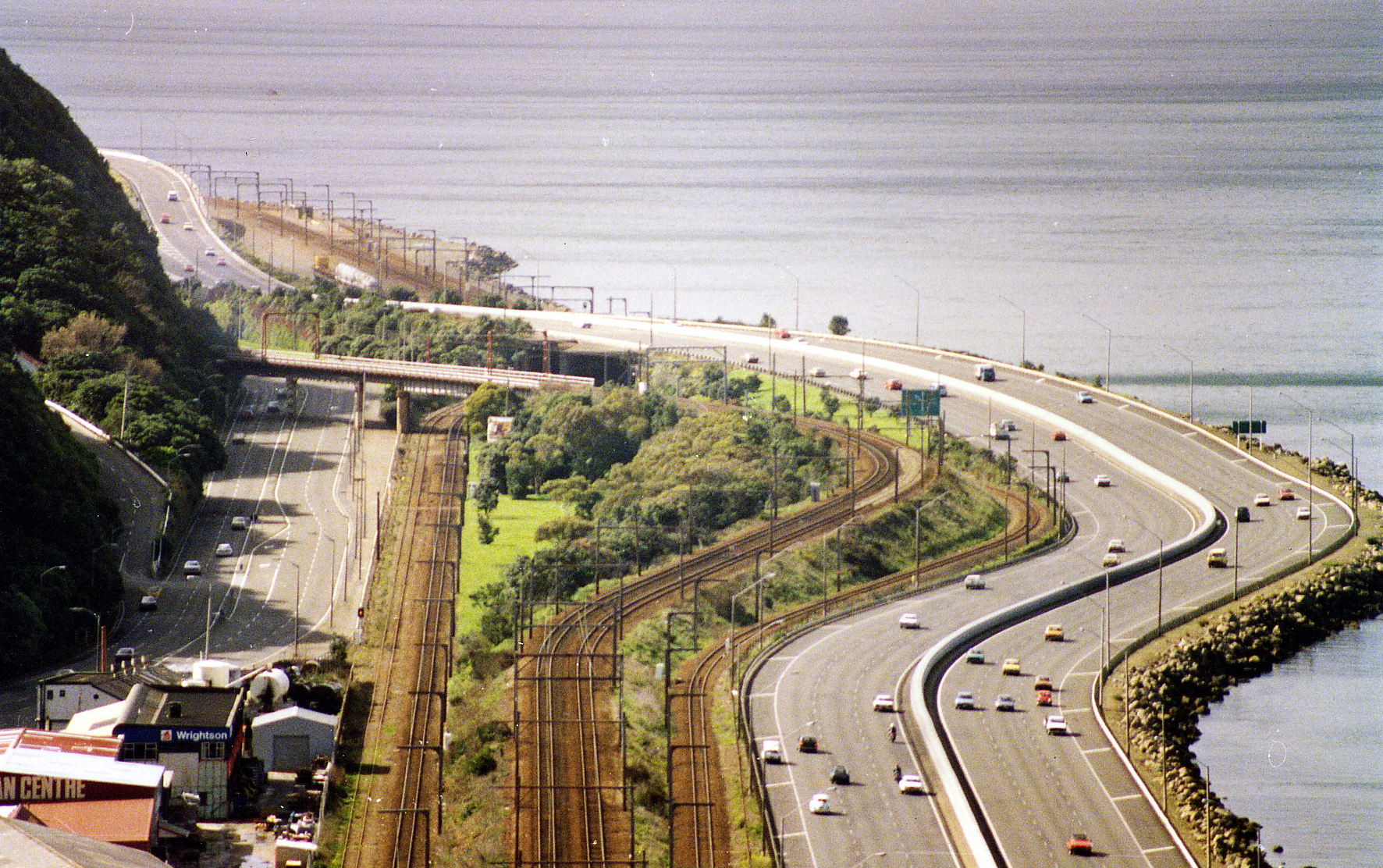
The NIMT Tawa Flat deviation's double-track climbing towards Tawa No. 1 tunnel over the up Wairarapa Line and Hutt Rd, with Ngauranga station in the background alongside the State Highway 1 motorway.

Map

The 8.38 miles (13.49 km) Tawa Flat deviation is a double-track section of the Kāpiti Line just north of Wellington, New Zealand, with two tunnels; the southernmost section of the North Island Main Trunk railway (NIMT) between Wellington and Auckland. It was built to bypass a limited capacity single track section of the original Wellington and Manawatu Railway (WMR) line which ascended from Wellington to Johnsonville and then descended to Tawa Flat. The original name of Tawa Flat was changed to Tawa in 1959.

When opened to passenger trains in June 1937, the deviation reduced the travel time from Wellington to Porirua by 15 minutes, to 27 minutes rather than 43 to 48 minutes. By 2016, the time from Wellington to Porirua had further reduced to 21 minutes for stopping trains, despite extra stops at Redwood, Linden, and Kenepuru which each add 48 seconds to the travel time, and to 17 minutes for non-stopping trains.

== The deviation ==
The original line from Wellington, constructed by the WMR, wound up the south side of the Ngaio Gorge with steep grades, tight curves, and tunnels with curves in them, to Ngaio, Khandallah, and Johnsonville before descending through difficult hilly country to Tawa Flat.

The new line split from the existing line at Thorndon, where the old line began its ascent to cross the Hutt Road toward Wadestown and Johnsonville. It shared tracks with the Wairarapa Line to the new Distant Junction, where Aotea Quay joins the Hutt Road, where it split from but followed the Wairarapa Line along the waterfront to Kaiwharawhara before climbing a new bank to enter the southern portal of the new No. 1 tunnel (1,238 m). From the northern portal of the new No. 2 tunnel (4,323 m) at Glenside it followed the floor of the Tawa valley down to Tawa Flat where it joined the existing line south of McLellan Street, near the boundary of present-day Tawa College and Tawa Intermediate. at Mt Misery The deviation was the first stage of the electrification of the NIMT railway from Wellington to Paekākāriki, and duplication to Pukerua Bay. It saved 2.5 miles (4.0 km), lowered the summit level from 518 feet (158 m) south of Raroa to 195 feet (59 m) at the north portal of No 2 tunnel, and reduced the maximum gradient from 1 in 36 (on the initial climb out of Wellington) and then 1 in 40 (to Ngaio and Khandallah) to a maximum of 1 in 110 in No 1 tunnel and 1 in 122 in No 2 tunnel. Previously the maximum load out of Wellington for a locomotive was 175 tons, and some trains were banked and then re-formed at Johnsonville. The new NZR Ka class steam locomotives could haul 600 rather than 280 tons, although further north between Plimmerton to Paekākāriki they were limited to 490 tons. Hence electrification extended to Paekākāriki, so including the climb up the bank between Plimmerton and Pukerua Bay. The grade in the opposite direction was 1 in 100 on the climb south from Tawa to Takapau Road and the north portal of No 2 tunnel.

== Planning ==
In 1914 the NZR General Manager E. H. Hiley told parliament that the Johnsonville–Wellington section of the NIMT was approaching capacity, and in 1915 NZR district engineer A. Kock and the Public Works Department submitted a report which was deferred until after World War I.

In 1923 various options were investigated including tunnels direct from Koro Koro to Linden and Petone to Tawa Flat (though this option would interfere with Hutt traffic and require a sea wall to protect the line along the waterfront). Five options for the deviation were considered. They were: two alternative routes with tunnels from Takapu Road to the Korokoro Stream near Petone, a tunnel from Takapu Road to a point a little southwest of the Horokiwi Stream on the harbour edge, an alternative northern portal for the northern of the two tunnels constructed (Tawa No.2 tunnel), and the chosen route.

The total cost of the deviation was estimated at £1,409,000. Rock excavated from the tunnels was to be used for harbour reclamation to provide access to the first tunnel and to enlarge the rail yard in Wellington.

== Construction ==
The deviation of about 7 miles (11.3 km) as the Wellington-New Plymouth Line (Wellington - Tawa Flat Deviation) was authorised by the Railways Authorisation Act, 1924. The deviation was running generally to the eastward of the existing Wellington - New Plymouth railway. As built there were two long tunnels; Tawa No. 1 (1,238 metres (4,062 ft) with a 1 in 110 gradient) and Tawa No. 2 (4,323 metres (14,183 ft) with a 1 in 122 gradient). Tawa No. 2 tunnel, which remains the longest double track tunnel in New Zealand, passes under Newlands and comes out at Glenside, en route to Tawa.

A preliminary contract to drive a header through Tunnel No 1 was let to Burnside and Matthews, who commenced work in July 1927. The main contract for double track tunnels and bridges was advertised throughout the Empire but no satisfactory tenders were received, so the Public Works Department took over the whole job in May 1928.

Work started from both portals, and also from a ventilation shaft with an entrance near the (superseded) Belmont Viaduct to Tunnel No 2. The walls were of two foot (nearly 610 mm) concrete, and the tunnels were about 6 metres (20 ft) high and 7.8 metres (26 ft) wide. The bank to the first tunnel was built in the harbour. Including the engine shed and goods yard, 68 acres (28 ha) of the harbour was filled in costing £490,000.

A "Hutt Road" flyover was constructed over the two tracks of the Wairarapa Line and the four lanes of the Hutt Road south of the Tawa No. 1 tunnel from the new roadway, Aotea Quay. As the flyover crosses them at an angle of 60 degrees it is 48.8 metres (160 ft) long. Using a central pier in the middle of the Hutt road was cheaper but bought objections from motorists, and work was suspended for a time. Originally a level crossing was proposed, but strong local objections led to the flyover being built.

The current configuration of railway tracks at the south end of Tawa No. 1 tunnel (as shown in the photo at right above) was adopted in 1965 when the down Wairarapa track was moved from the west to the east of the NIMT tracks and required the replacement of the turnouts at Wellington Distant Junction. This rearrangement was made possible by additional harbour reclamation during the construction of the Wellington Urban Motorway. The new layout reduced junction conflicts further south at Wellington Distant Junction near Aotea Quay and the Rail Ferry Terminal where the NIMT and the Wairarapa Line separate. Previously there were regular delays when trains crossed from one track to another at 30 km/h.

A bridge (67 m) was constructed between the two tunnels to cross State Highway 1 where it commences an ascent of Ngauranga Gorge.

Six new railway bridges were constructed on the section of track from the northern portal of Tawa No. 2 tunnel at Glenside to just north of the Takapu Road railway station to allow the railway to cross the stream as it followed the stream down the narrow valley floor. From the last bridge, just north of Takapu railway station, to Porirua, the railway remains on the eastern bank of the stream.

After Takapu Road the valley widens into Tawa Flat where the stream meanders over the valley floor. One meander on the former Ranui Golf Course known as the Devil's Elbow came close to the original railway line on what is now Duncan Street. It was cut off and filled to allow for the construction of the new railway line and the new Tawa Flat railway station and rail yard.

Rowells Road, which crosses the railway over the northern portal of Tunnel No. 2, provides access to properties on the eastern side of the railway north of the tunnel portal. One house in the Willowbank area, just south of Takapu Road, was provided with an underpass to give access to the road. North of the tunnels, there are two road crossings. A bridge was constructed over the new railway at the south end of Takapu Road station to provide road access from the Main Road to the Takapu valley. This bridge now also provides access to the motorway interchange, Grenada North, and the supermarket on Takapu Island, an area between the rail and motorway. A level crossing was provided at Tawa Street to give access to Duncan Street and eastern Tawa.

== Completion ==
The deviation opened to goods trains on 22 July 1935 using a single track, now the up main or northbound track, with tablet working. On 19 June 1937, the new Wellington railway station opened and the deviation opened to passenger trains using both the up and down mains with double line automatic signalling, providing double track running from Wellington to Tawa Flat. On the same day, the new stations at Takapu Road and Tawa Flat (now Tawa) opened to passengers and the railway connection between Johnsonville and Tawa was severed.

With the completion of the deviation, the old single track railway line from Wellington to Tawa Flat was terminated at Johnsonville, electrified, equipped with a fully automatic electric signalling system to allow the automatic running of trains and renamed the Johnsonville Branch. English Electric DM/D class electric multiple units entered service on the branch on 4 July 1938.

The first section of the Johnsonville-Porirua Motorway, which opened in December 1950, broadly follows the route of the former railway line from Johnsonville to Takapu Road. The Belmont viaduct north of Johnsonville, between what is now Paparangi and Granada, could be seen a little to the east of the motorway. This was a steel viaduct, 38 metres (125 ft) high and 104 metres (341 ft) long, built in 1903 to replace the original viaduct completed in November 1886. The original structure, constructed with 212,000 superficial feet of kauri timber, was the largest wooden trestle bridge in New Zealand. On 15 December 1951, after 14 years of disuse, the rusting 48-year-old steel viaduct was demolished for safety reasons by Territorial Force engineers as a training exercise using 44 kg of TNT. The original concrete abutments can still be found in the regenerating bush of Seton Nossiter Park.

Some of the old route from Takapu Road to Tawa Street can still be found but parts of this section were destroyed by the Taylor Terrace housing development in the late 1950s. Duncan Street in Tawa follows the route of the old line from Tawa Street to Tawa College. Widening of Duncan Street in the mid-1950s obliterated the remains of the old Tawa railway station platform, just north of the northern end of the present northbound Redwood platform, and other evidence of the former railway.

The new deviation increased train speeds and reduced travel times between Wellington and Tawa, but curves south of No. 1 tunnel, between the tunnels, and between the northern portal of No. 2 tunnel and Tawa prevent trains from maintaining full line speeds over the full length of the deviation.

On 15 December 1957, double track from Tawa Flat to Porirua was completed and additional signals installed between Kaiwharawhara and Tawa Flat. This further increased the capacity of the line and allowed more frequent services between Wellington and Porirua.

== Railway stations ==
The deviation bypassed all the railway stations on the original WMR between Wellington and Johnsonville. There were no stations on the old line between Johnsonville and Tawa Flat. New railway stations on the deviation opened at Kaiwara (now Kaiwharawhara), Takapu Road, and Tawa Flat on the 19 June 1937.

=== Kaiwharawhara station ===
The first station on the new route was Kaiwarra, an existing station on the Wairarapa line. It was renamed Kaiwharawhara on 9 February 1951 by the New Zealand Geographic Board. As part of the work associated with the deviation, land was reclaimed from the harbour and new up (northbound) and down (southbound) tracks for the deviation were laid to the east of the existing Wairarapa line. The old Kaiwarra station and signal box were removed and two new island platforms were constructed, the western platform for the Wairarapa line and the eastern platform for the new line to Tawa Flat. This arrangement changed in 1965 when the down Wairarapa line was shifted to the east and the western platform was then used for northbound trains and the eastern platform for southbound trains. Hutt line trains were timetabled to stop at Kaiwharawhara while Kāpiti Line trains stopped on request only to pick up passengers waiting on the up or northbound platform or to drop off passengers on down or southbound trains. Little used, Kaiwharawhara station was closed temporarily on the 13 June 2013 and permanently on the 21 November 2013 after an inspection revealed corrosion of the pedestrian overbridge. The overbridge and passenger shelters have since been removed and trains no longer stop at Kaiwharawhara.

=== Takapu Road station ===
With the opening of the deviation, a new railway station was provided at Takapu Road with separate east and west platforms and a simple passenger shelter on each platform. The original shelters were replaced with new passenger shelters during the year ending June 2015.

=== Tawa railway station ===
Tawa Flat railway station was renamed Tawa railway station on 23 February 1959 in conjunction with the change of name of the Borough of Tawa Flat to the Borough of Tawa. The area then became known as Tawa.

The old Tawa Flat railway station, with mechanical signals and a signal box, was located on what is now Duncan Street. As it was bypassed by the new line on the floor of the valley, a new railway station was provided on an island platform, below and 400 metres north of the old station. The new Tawa Flat station was equipped with a stationmaster's office with a ticket sale window opening to an enclosed waiting room, toilets for men and women, a luggage and parcel storage room, and a signal relay room. A crossing loop was provided on the western side of the up and down mains and crossovers provided north and south of the station to allow trains to terminate at Tawa Flat and return to Wellington or Porirua. A siding was provided for freight. The stationmaster's office included a signal indicator panel and miniature lever frame to enable station staff to signal trains.

Because Tawa Flat was at the end of the railway track duplication it was a permanently staffed station until the 15 December 1957 when the duplication was extended to Porirua. With the extension of the duplication, Tawa Flat became a "switch out" station and was only "switched in" when required to signal shunting or other controlled movements. Later the siding and loop at Tawa were removed and Tawa became an unstaffed station. The original 1937 station building was removed in 2012 and replaced with a passenger shelter.

=== Additional railway station at Redwood ===
An additional railway station between Takapu Road and Tawa, named Redwood station, was opened at Tawa Street on the 15 December 1963 to provide for new housing development south of Tawa Street, on Taylor Terrace and the northern part of the new Redwood development. The platforms are staggered north and south of the level crossing to prevent prolonged operation of the barrier arms and flashing lights and bells at the level crossing, as trains in either direction stop after using the level crossing.

=== Proposed railway stations at Glenside and Newlands ===
Additional railway stations have been proposed at Glenside, north of the northern portal of Tawa No. 2 Tunnel to serve Glenside, Churton Park and other expanding residential areas near Johnsonville, and underground at Newlands in No. 2 Tunnel to serve Newlands.

=== Park and ride ===
Since the original opening, parking spaces have been provided at Takapu Road, Redwood, and Tawa stations to allow people to park and ride the trains into Wellington.

== Electrification ==
In 1925, the Merz & McLellan Report pointed out that electrification would remove the need to relieve the steep (1 in 57) gradients to the Pukerua Bay summit by a deviation to the east, and was desirable in the planned long No. 2 tunnel to eliminate the smoke problem. Electrification of the line from Wellington to Paekākāriki was approved in 1933 with completion planned to coincide with the completion of the Tawa Flat deviation.

From 24 July 1940, the line from Wellington to Paekākāriki was electrified at 1500 V DC overhead, being delayed by the late delivery of some items from England. Electrification eliminated the smoke nuisance in the tunnels, but the lining of the two Tawa tunnels remains coated with a thick layer of soot.

Further extension of the electrification north from Paekākāriki was completed to Paraparaumu on 7 May 1983 and Waikanae on 20 February 2011.

The Tawa No 2 Tunnel and a short section of sharply-curved track north of Muri on the North–South Junction are the only sections of the Wellington overhead power catenary system where, for technical reasons, a modern auto-tensioned overhead system could not be installed; the Hutt Valley Line and the Johnsonville Line were upgraded in 2018-2021.

== Signalling ==
Before the deviation, the original single-track line through Johnsonville was nearing capacity. It operated with mechanical signals and an interlocked tablet system which allowed only one train to occupy a section of track between signalled stations at a time. The long single-track sections from Johnsonville to Tawa Flat and from Tawa Flat to Porirua and the gradients from Wellington up to Ngaio (which sometimes required banking engines) limited the capacity of the line.

The deviation provided double track from Wellington to Tawa Flat equipped with double line automatic signalling. With double line automatic signalling, the frequency of train services is largely determined by the spacing of signals, which sets the following distance of trains. The capacity of the line was significantly improved when the deviation was equipped with a DC-immune double line automatic signalling system using AC-powered track circuits, searchlight signals, and motorised points. The signalling allowed automatic double-track operation, with up and down lines. This enabled trains to run at six-minute intervals between Wellington and Tawa Flat. But the single line from Tawa Flat to Porirua continued to restrict the number of trains using the deviation.

To reduce potential delays on double line, "Stop and Proceed" signals were installed. These signals allow trains to stop at a red signal, then proceed past it at low speed after a short delay, prepared to stop short of an obstruction or close up behind a previous train. Telephones were provided at signals and other strategic points to enable train crews to contact Train Control.

The new Tawa Flat station was equipped with crossovers, a loop, and a siding. A miniature lever frame in the new station building provided local control of the signalling, allowing trains to be passed via the crossing loop, controlling shunting movements, and allowing trains to terminate at Tawa Flat and return to either Wellington or Porirua. As Tawa Flat was the end of double track until 1957, it was continuously staffed to allow trains to be switched from double to single track and to issue tablets for the single-track section to Porirua.

The capacity of the line improved with the completion of the double track from Tawa Flat to Porirua on 15 December 1957. Additional signals were installed in No. 2 tunnel and between Takapu Road and Tawa Flat to allow trains to run at two-minute intervals between Wellington and Porirua. This allowed additional trains to run between Wellington and Porirua during peak periods.

DC-immune AC-coded track circuits were used on the long track sections in the tunnels where trains ran at maximum speed. From 1957, Tawa Flat became a "switch out" station, allowing the lever frame to be "switched out" to automatic double-line operation when not required for local signalled movements. Tawa Flat was now only staffed during the day, Monday to Friday, for ticket sales or when local control of the signalling was required. When the Tawa Flat was switched out for automatic double-line operation, "A" lights on the absolute stop signals before crossovers indicated to drivers that the station was switched out and the crossovers were locked for double-line operation and the signal could be treated as a "stop and proceed" signal.

Power to the signalling system on the deviation was provided by a 3.3 kV power distribution line fed from Kaiwharawhara, which once extended as far north as McKays Crossing. To allow diesel-powered trains to operate on the line during a general power outage, a diesel standby generator at Kaiwharawhara provides power for the 3.3 kV distribution line.

The 3,3 kV distribution line was principally overhead but in cable through the tunnels and for other short lengths. In conjunction with work to upgrade the HVDC Inter-Island link in the early 1990s, the 3.3 kV distribution was placed in underground cable from the northern portal of No. 2 tunnel to Takapu Road.

== Locomotives and multiple units ==
Steam Locomotives hauled trains on the deviation between 1935 and 1940 but were generally prohibited from operation on the line after electrification due to the smoke nuisance in the tunnels. With the completion of electrification in 1940, ED class locomotives, first introduced in 1938 for use on this line, were used to haul all goods and passenger trains between Wellington and Paekākāriki. DM/D electric multiple units first ran on the line on 5 September 1949.

From 1949, ED class, and from their introduction in 1952, EW class electric locomotives continued to haul all long distance passenger and goods trains, shunting services, and some local passenger trains during peak periods as there were not enough electric multiple units for all passenger services. From 1952, the higher powered EW class locomotives were the preferred locomotive for use on passenger trains and for use on this line because of the gradients and curves. ED locomotives were found to be hard on the track and not suitable for passenger trains but were however still seen hauling some goods trains and shunting services, and occasionally passenger trains.

The need for electric locomotives on the line progressively reduced and was eventually eliminated due to: the lowering of the floors of the Paekākāriki tunnels giving increased clearances that allowed the larger DA class main line diesel locomotives to operate on long-distance goods and passenger trains from 1967; diesel locomotives replacing electric locomotives on shunting services; the subsequent phasing out of all shunting services; and the arrival of the EM class electric multiple units in the 1980s that eliminated the need for electric locomotives on suburban passenger trains. Eight of the ten ED locomotives were withdrawn from service in 1969 and the remaining two in March 1981. The last EW hauled passenger service was on 11 February 1983.

The DM/D electric multiple units introduced in 1949 were largely replaced by EM class electric multiple units introduced between 1982 and 1983 but some continued to operate at peak periods until 2011 when FT/FP class (Matangi) multiple units began operation. The EM/ET class multiple units, which were introduced to replace the locomotive-hauled trains and some of the DM/D fleet, last operated on 27 May 2016 when additional FT/FP class (Matangi) multiple units arrived.

To provide additional capacity before the arrival of the Matangi multiple units, three EO class electric locomotives, originally purchased in 1968 for use in the Otira Tunnel, were transferred to Wellington in 2007 and with six SE class carriages operated services between 8 December 2008 and 10 October 2011, including a daily return service to Plimmerton. These locomotives were originally classified as EA class but were reclassified as EO in the early 1980s. In Wellington, they were used to top and tail the train to avoid the need to transfer locomotives from one end of the train to the other as had been the case with the EDs and EWs.

== Flood and other risks ==
The deviation is susceptible in places to flooding, slips, washouts, scouring of bridge abutments and piers, falling trees, fire, earthquakes and tsunamis, with the greatest risks in the section from Glenside to Takapu Road. In the past, the line has been closed for short periods due to fires, flooding of the Kaiwharawhara stream, a burst stormwater pipe near the southern portal of No. 2 tunnel, and minor slips and falling trees between Glenside and Takapu Road.

Heavy rain events in the Tawa valley catchment area cause the stream through the valley to flood. The stream channel is narrow, close to the rail in many places, and often runs at full capacity during floods. Some stream diversions have brought the stream closer to the railway, such as the Tawa School diversion in the mid-1950s that cut off a meander of the stream through the centre of the school. It was achieved by cutting a new channel alongside the railway. The Tawa Street, McLellan Street, and Collins Avenue road bridges all have limited flood capacity and add to the risks.

Between Glenside and Takapu Road, the six steel bridges built to cross the stream have abutments and piers built on concrete mass foundations without piles. The Tangiwai disaster in 1953 emphasised the susceptibility of these bridges to scouring during floods.

To reduce the flood risk in the Tawa valley, the construction of the Johnsonville to Porirua Motorway in 1950 was used to create a series of dams on the eastern side of the valley to pond high water flows and release the water at a controlled rate. Stebbings dam in Glenside, near the north portal of No. 2 tunnel, was completed in 1994 to provide a similar function to control flood water from the west of Glenside. Some work has been done to cut banks away from the track to reduce the risk from small slips and to provide access for track maintenance machinery.

Flooding remains a threat to the security of the railway line. Blackberry, gorse, scrub and trees near the railway line present a fire risk.

In addition, the deviation is located in an earthquake prone region. It is built on reclaimed land from Wellington station to the southern entrance to No. 1 tunnel and crosses the Wellington fault as it enters the southern portal of No. 1 tunnel. The line then runs between two major fault lines, the Wellington and Ohariu faults, and is close to the Wairarapa fault, the Marlborough fault system, and the plate boundary between the Pacific plate and Australian plate. It is built over a subduction zone where the Pacific plate passes under the Australian plate with the surface boundary to the east of the North Island and to the south in Cook Strait. Underground the plate boundary is about twenty kilometres below the deviation. Frequent earthquakes in the Wellington area increase the risk of subsidence, slips, falling trees and structures, and track displacement. The section of the line from Wellington station to Kaiwharawhara is exposed to tsunami risk. Following larger earthquakes, the line is closed for inspection causing disruption to passenger services. Since the opening of the deviation in 1935, no significant earthquake or flood damage has occurred.
