= List of railway stations in the Wellington Region =

List on the Wikimedia project

Schematic map of the regional rail network

This is a list of railway stations in the Wellington Region, the local government region covering the southernmost portion of New Zealand's North Island. It includes all railway stations in the region with regularly scheduled passenger services.

The regional public transport service, Metlink, operates four electrified suburban services and the Wairarapa Connection, serving all stations in the region except Ōtaki. Two KiwiRail services, the Capital Connection and the Northern Explorer, also serve the region. All stations in the region are owned by Greater Wellington Regional Council except Wellington, which is owned by KiwiRail.

The first railway line in the region opened on 14 April 1874 between Wellington and Lower Hutt. Over the next two decades, two main railway lines were constructed from Wellington; the Wellington and Manawatu Railway, running north along the west coast through Porirua and the Kāpiti Coast, and the Wairarapa Line along the Hutt and Wairarapa valleys. The W&MR was later incorporated into the North Island Main Trunk route between Auckland and Wellington. These lines have both been rerouted substantially since, with the Johnsonville Branch and the Melling Branch being former alignments of these lines respectively. The present network takes a radial form centred on Wellington, with 49 stations in total.

== List ==
| Name | Photo | Line(s) | Service(s) | Territorial authority | Opened |
|---|---|---|---|---|---|
| Ava | | Wairarapa Line | Hutt Valley Line | Lower Hutt | 27 May 1927 |
| Awarua Street | | Johnsonville Branch | Johnsonville Line | Wellington | 2 July 1938 |
| Box Hill | | Johnsonville Branch | Johnsonville Line | Wellington | 16 July 1956 |
| Carterton | | Wairarapa Line | Wairarapa Connection | Carterton | 1 November 1880 |
| Crofton Downs | | Johnsonville Branch | Johnsonville Line | Wellington | 25 March 1963 |
| Epuni | | Wairarapa Line | Hutt Valley Line | Lower Hutt | 7 January 1946 |
| Featherston | | Wairarapa Line | Wairarapa Connection | South Wairarapa | 12 October 1878 |
| Heretaunga | | Wairarapa Line | Hutt Valley Line | Upper Hutt | 1908 |
| Johnsonville | | Johnsonville Line | Johnsonville Line | Wellington | 21 September 1885 |
| Kenepuru | | North Island Main Trunk | Kāpiti Line | Porirua | 8 April 1963 |
| Khandallah | | Johnsonville Branch | Johnsonville Line | Wellington | 21 September 1885 |
| Linden | | North Island Main Trunk | Kāpiti Line | Wellington | 28 July 1940 |
| Mana^{[a]} | | North Island Main Trunk | Kāpiti Line | Porirua | 5 September 1949 |
| Manor Park | | Wairarapa Line | Hutt Valley Line | Lower Hutt | 1 March 1954 |
| Masterton | | Wairarapa Line | Wairarapa Connection | Masterton | 1 November 1880 |
| Matarawa | | Wairarapa Line | Wairarapa Connection | Carterton | 1 November 1880 |
| Maymorn | | Wairarapa Line | Wairarapa Connection | Upper Hutt | 3 November 1955 |
| Melling^{[b]} | | Melling Branch | Melling Line | Lower Hutt | 26 May 1908 |
| Naenae | | Wairarapa Line | Hutt Valley Line | Lower Hutt | 7 January 1946 |
| Ngaio | | Johnsonville Branch | Johnsonville Line | Wellington | 21 September 1885 |
| Ngauranga | | Wairarapa Line | Hutt Valley Line; Melling Line | Wellington | 20 April 1874 |
| Ōtaki | | North Island Main Trunk | Capital Connection | Kāpiti Coast | 2 August 1886 |
| Paekākāriki | | North Island Main Trunk | Kāpiti Line | Kāpiti Coast | 31 March 1886 |
| Paraparaumu | | North Island Main Trunk | Capital Connection; Kāpiti Line; Northern Explorer | Kāpiti Coast | 2 August 1886 |
| Paremata | | North Island Main Trunk | Kāpiti Line | Porirua | 24 September 1885 |
| Petone | | Wairarapa Line | Hutt Valley Line; Melling Line; Wairarapa Connection | Lower Hutt | June 1875 |
| Plimmerton | | North Island Main Trunk | Kāpiti Line | Porirua | 2 October 1885 |
| Pomare | | Wairarapa Line | Hutt Valley Line | Lower Hutt | 9 August 1954 |
| Porirua | | North Island Main Trunk | Kāpiti Line | Porirua | 24 September 1885 |
| Pukerua Bay^{[c]} | | North Island Main Trunk | Kāpiti Line | Porirua | 25 December 1885 |
| Raroa | | Johnsonville Branch | Johnsonville Line | Wellington | 17 June 1940 |
| Redwood | | North Island Main Trunk | Kāpiti Line | Wellington | 15 December 1963 |
| Renall Street | | Wairarapa Line | Wairarapa Connection | Masterton | 1936 |
| Silverstream | | Wairarapa Line | Hutt Valley Line | Upper Hutt | 21 November 1954 |
| Simla Crescent | | Johnsonville Branch | Johnsonville Line | Wellington | 2 July 1938 |
| Solway | | Wairarapa Line | Wairarapa Connection | Masterton | 1 November 1880 |
| Taitā | | Wairarapa Line | Hutt Valley Line | Lower Hutt | 14 April 1947 |
| Takapu Road | | North Island Main Trunk | Kāpiti Line | Wellington | 20 June 1937 |
| Tawa | | North Island Main Trunk | Kāpiti Line | Wellington | 24 September 1885 |
| Trentham | | Wairarapa Line | Hutt Valley Line | Upper Hutt | 8 January 1907 |
| Upper Hutt | | Wairarapa Line | Hutt Valley Line; Wairarapa Connection | Upper Hutt | 1 February 1876 |
| Waikanae | | North Island Main Trunk | Capital Connection; Kāpiti Line | Kāpiti Coast | 2 August 1886 |
| Wallaceville | | Wairarapa Line | Hutt Valley Line | Upper Hutt | 1 February 1876 |
| Waterloo | | Wairarapa Line | Hutt Valley Line; Wairarapa Connection | Lower Hutt | 27 May 1927 |
| Wellington | | North Island Main Trunk; Wairarapa Line; Johnsonville Line | Capital Connection; Hutt Valley Line; Johnsonville Line; Kāpiti Line; Melling Line; Northern Explorer; Wairarapa Connection | Wellington | 19 June 1937 |
| Western Hutt^{[d]} | | Melling Branch | Melling Line | Lower Hutt | 14 April 1874 |
| Wingate | | Wairarapa Line | Hutt Valley Line | Lower Hutt | 25 September 1950 |
| Woburn | | Wairarapa Line | Hutt Valley Line | Lower Hutt | 27 May 1927 |
| Woodside | | Wairarapa Line | Wairarapa Connection | South Wairarapa | 14 May 1880 |

=== Notes ===
^{a} Was known as Dolly Varden (after a ship) until 1960 when local pressure resulted in the area being renamed Mana.
^{b} With the closure of the Western Hutt section of the Wairarapa Line and the formation of the Melling Branch from the remainder, Melling station was relocated to the south side of the Melling Link road.
^{c} Originally Pukerua.
^{d} Originally Lower Hutt.

== See also ==
- List of Auckland railway stations
