= Manor Park railway station, Lower Hutt =

Railway station in New Zealand

Manor Park
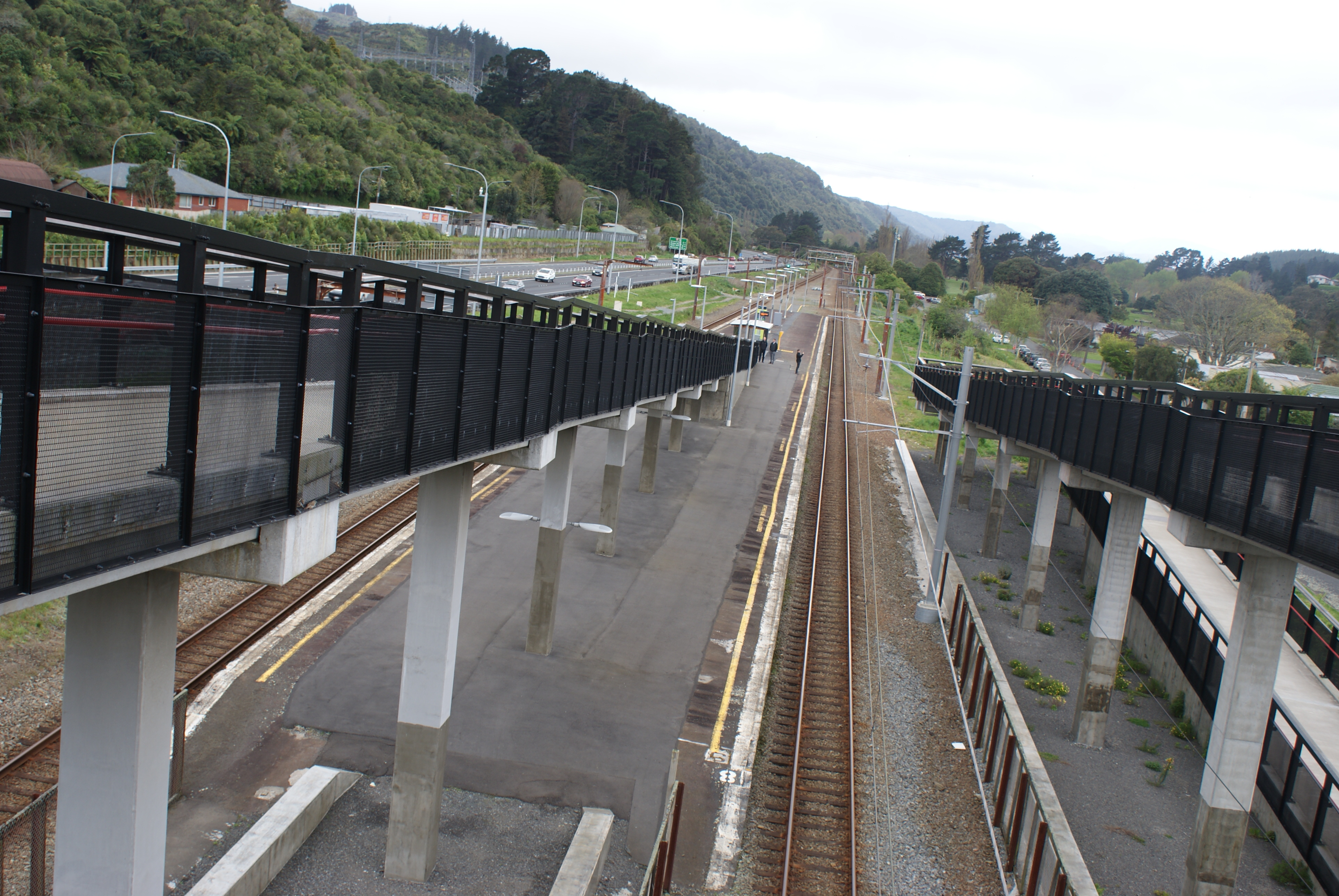

General information
- Location: Golf Road, Manor Park, Lower Hutt, New Zealand
- Coordinates: 41°09′22.87″S 174°58′44.07″E
- System: Metlink suburban rail
- Owner: Greater Wellington Regional Council
- Line: Wairarapa Line
- Platforms: Island
- Tracks: Main line (2)

Construction
- Parking: Yes

Other information
- Station code: MANO
- Fare zone: 6

History
- Opened: 1 March 1954; 72 years ago
- Electrified: 24 July 1955; 71 years ago
- Former names: Haywards

Services
Preceding station	Transdev Wellington	Following station
Silverstream towards Upper Hutt	Hutt Valley Line	Pomare towards Wellington
Location

Manor Park railway station is a suburban railway station serving the suburb of Manor Park in Lower Hutt, New Zealand. The station is located on the Hutt Valley section of the Wairarapa Line, 23.7 km (14.7 mi) northeast of Wellington. The station is served by Metlink's electric multiple unit trains of the "Matangi" FP class. Trains stopping at Manor Park run to Wellington and Upper Hutt. The station has an island platform between two tracks.

The station is one of only three Hutt Valley line stations west of Te Awa Kairangi/Hutt River, the others being the Petone and Ava railway stations.

== History ==
In 1954 the Hutt Valley Branch became the main line, and the Melling-Haywards section was closed, with the western part of the old line becoming the single-track Melling Branch. A new station was erected at Haywards (now called Manor Park) where the new line from Pomare joined the existing line north. The old Haywards railway station had been opened (with Belmont railway station) on 15 December 1875.

The station received a new "park and ride" car park with a linking pedestrian overbridge as part of the new $42 million interchange southwest of the station between State Highway 2 and State Highway 58 over Haywards. Work on the new interchange commenced in 2015 and was completed two years later.

== Services ==
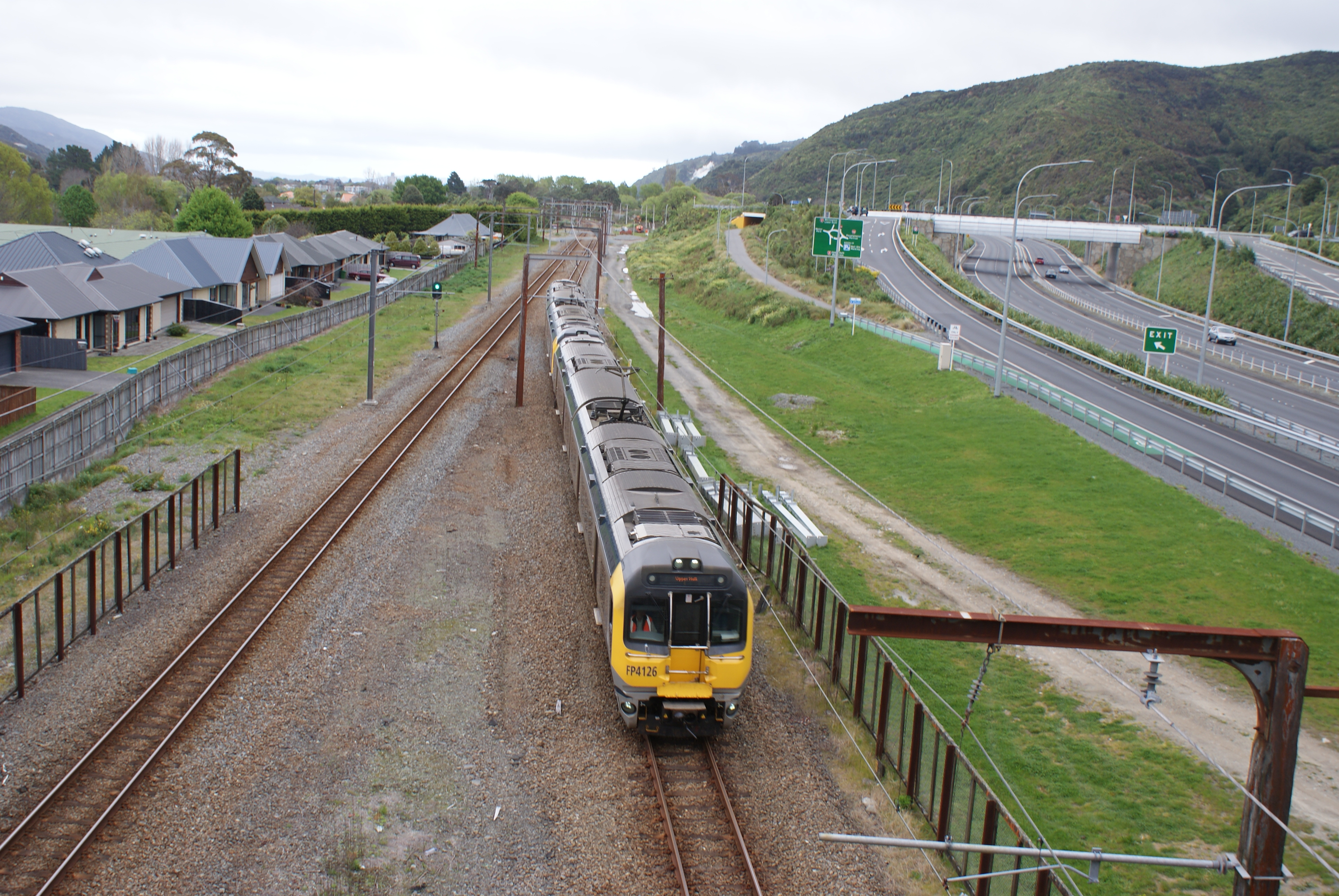
An eastbound Metlink train arriving at the station

The station, like most others on the Hutt Valley Line, receives one all-stops train every 20 minutes both ways off-peak. This changes in the peak hours, with trains running express services between Wellington and Taitā and stopping at all stops between Taitā and Upper Hutt.

No bus routes serve the station.
