= Kaiwharawhara railway station =

Railway station in New Zealand

Kaiwharawhara
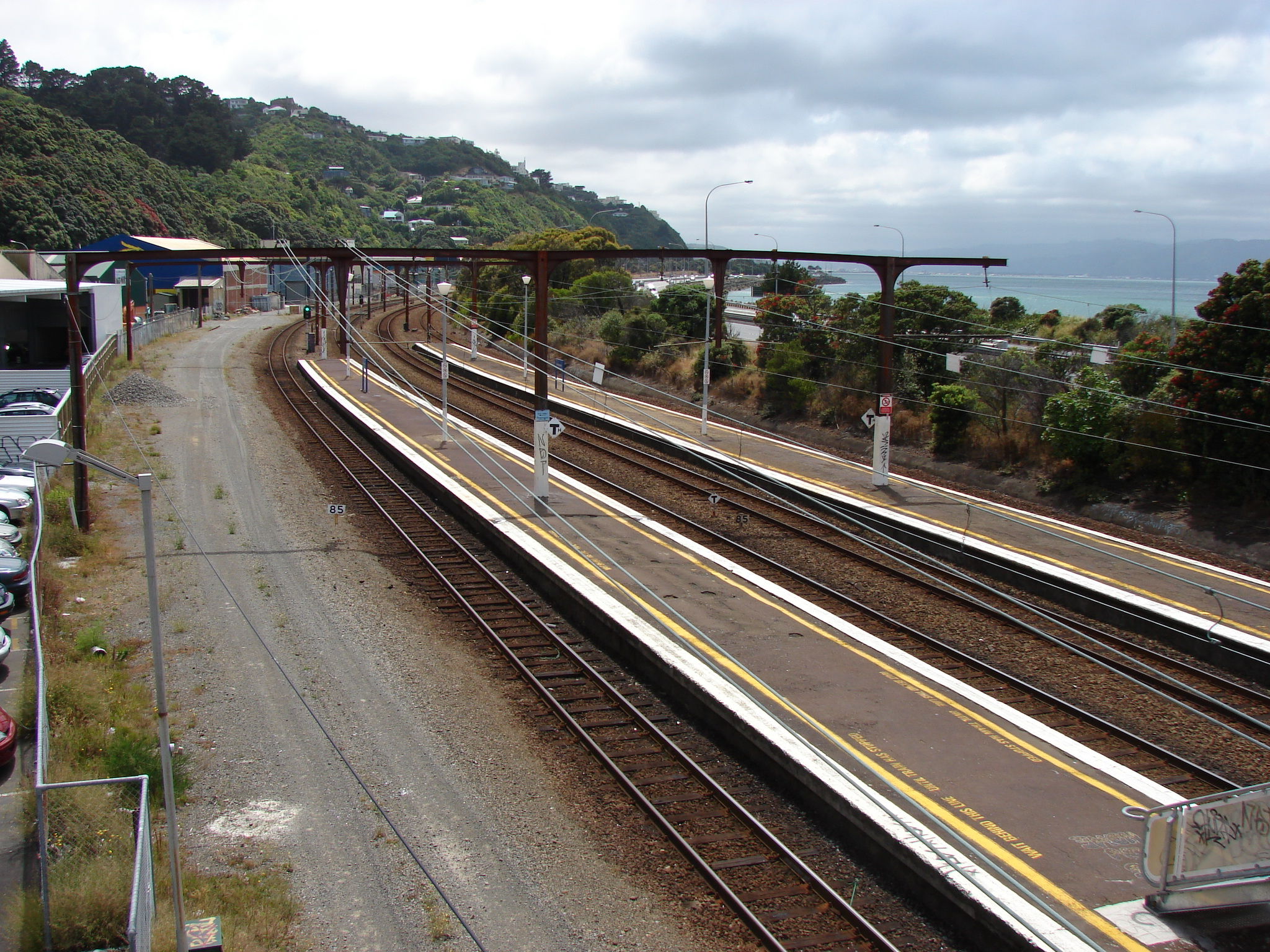

General information
- Location: Westminster Street, Kaiwharawhara, Wellington, New Zealand
- Coordinates: 41°15′36.18″S 174°47′28.92″E
- System: Metlink regional rail
- Owner: Greater Wellington Regional Council
- Lines: Melling Line; Hutt Valley Line; Kāpiti Line
- Platforms: Island (2)
- Tracks: Main line (4)

Other information
- Fare zone: 2

History
- Opened: 20-04-1874
- Closed: 23-11-2013
- Rebuilt: 1911, 1935
- Electrified: June 1940
- Former names: Kaiwarra

Former services
Preceding station	Transdev Wellington	Following station
Former Services
Ngauranga towards Melling	Melling Line	Wellington Terminus
Ngauranga towards Upper Hutt	Hutt Valley Line	Wellington Terminus
Takapu Road towards Waikanae	Kāpiti Line	Wellington Terminus
Location

Kaiwharawhara railway station, a former railway station on the North Island Main Trunk and the Wairarapa Line in Wellington in New Zealand, closed in 2013. It was the first station north of Wellington, serving the early suburb of Kaiwharawhara. Prior to its closure it was served by trains operated by Tranz Metro as part of the Metlink network on the Melling Line, the Hutt Valley Line and the Kāpiti Line.

Kaiwharawhara Station closed temporarily on 13 June 2013 due to safety concerns about the pedestrian overbridge, which a visual inspection carried out by the Regional Council found to have advanced corrosion. The station closed permanently on 21 November 2013 and the overbridge was dismantled in March 2014.

Kaiwharawhara had a unique platform arrangement for New Zealand. Looking north, the left-hand island platform was for up trains, the right-hand platform for down trains. The inner faces were used by Kāpiti Line services on the NIMT, the outer faces by Melling Line and Hutt Valley Line services on the Wairarapa Line.

== History ==
The Wairarapa Line reached the south bank of the Kaiwarra Stream in July 1873, and this section of line opened on 14 April 1874. Trains initially did not stop at Kaiwarra, but on 20 April Kaiwarra opened as a stop.

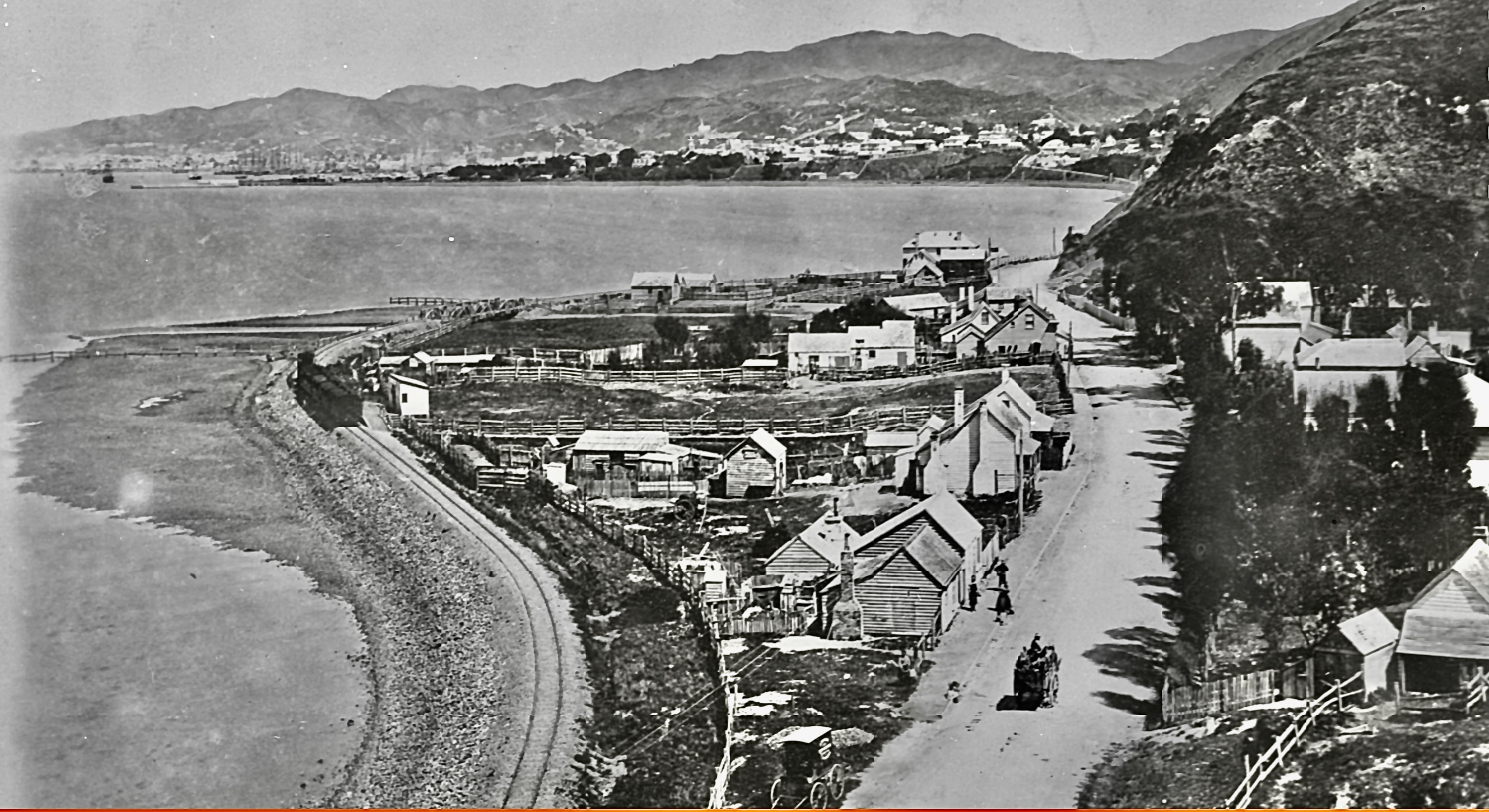
1875 Kaiwharawhara

Kaiwarra received its first building in late 1875. On 6 July 1874 Samuel Brown began a contract for a 6th class station, which he completed by 18 August. The passenger shelter cost £160. It did not have either crossing loops or sidings.

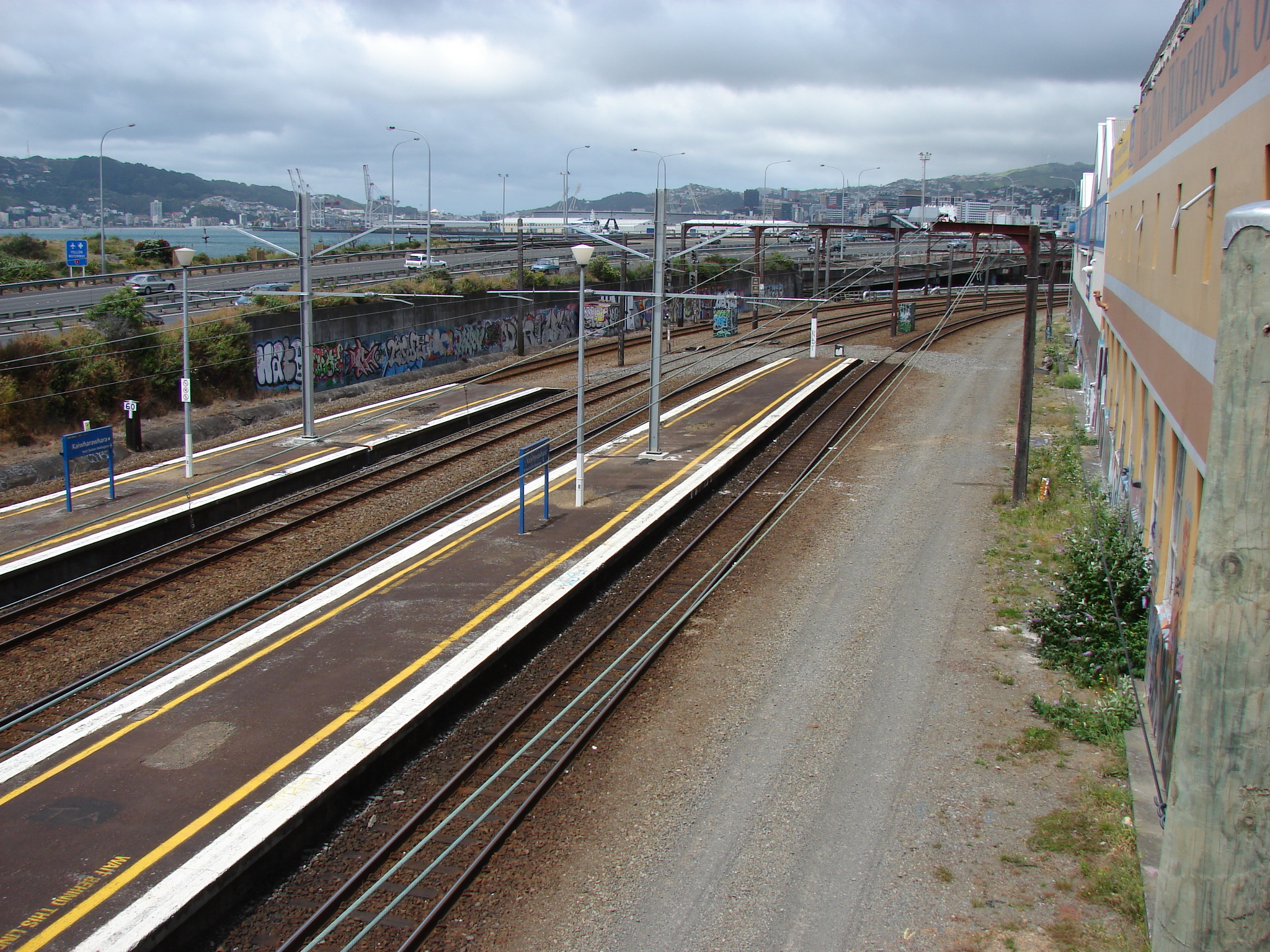
Kaiwharawhara railway station, looking south in the direction of Wellington

Early in the 20th century it was decided to duplicate the line between Wellington and Lower Hutt. Preparatory work was started in 1903 with construction commencing from Petone the following year, reaching Kaiwarra in 1909 and Wellington on 4 April 1911. A new station building designed by George Troup was erected in 1911.

In the mid-1930s, in conjunction with the construction of the Tawa Flat Deviation and the opening of the new Wellington station on the 19 June 1937, and the closure of the old Thorndon and Lambton stations, new up and down mains were laid through Kaiwarra to the east of the existing Hutt Valley main lines for the new Paekakariki Line (now the Kāpiti Line). The Kaiwarra signal box was dismantled and the old railway station replaced with two new narrow island platforms with simple passenger shelters. The western platform was for the Hutt Valley line and the eastern platform for the Paekakariki line.

The Kaiwarra station was renamed Kaiwharawhara station on 9 February 1951 by a decision of the New Zealand Geographic Board.

The current configuration of railway tracks was adopted in 1965 when the down Hutt Valley Line track was moved from the west to the east of the Kāpiti Line tracks. This was made possible by additional harbour reclamation during the construction of the Wellington Urban Motorway. The new layout reduced junction conflicts further south at Wellington Distant Junction near Aotea Key where the North Island Main Trunk and the Wairarapa Lines combined into a single up main and single down main. With the new layout, the western island platform was for up trains and the eastern platform for down trains.

With the rearrangement of the tracks, the old down main from Ngauranga to Kaiwharawhara became the up main and the old up main was connected to the shunt road from Distant Junction and the loop at Ngauranga. This gave a fifth track through Kaiwharawhara running on the western side of the four main lines, as was evidenced for many years by the extra track with overhead wiring still in place, which was used to access an oil depot (just south of the Kaiwharawhara Stream), the NZR Signals Depot, and several warehouses.

The original simple passenger shelters on each platform constructed in 1937 were removed some time during the 1990s. These shelters were open to face the track on each side with a central wall. Clearance between the central wall and the platform-edges was limited, affording restricted standing room between the walls and passing trains.

== Services ==
Before the closure of the station in 2013, off-peak trains stopped here half-hourly on the Hutt Valley, and hourly on the Melling Line with more frequent services during peak periods, while Kāpiti Line trains stopped on request only to pick up passengers waiting for up or northbound trains and to drop off passengers on down trains.

== Facilities and possible emergency use ==
Repair and prefabrication or prewiring of signalling equipment was carried out at the Kaiwharawhara Depot from c. 1900 until 1993, when it was transferred to Woburn railway station.

There are now no shelters or other buildings nor any dedicated car parking. Access was via a footbridge from Westminster Street. In 2013, the overbridge constructed in 1937 was found to be seriously corroded and the station was closed as a result. The overbridge was demolished in March 2014 with the stairs, previously renewed and in good condition, relocated to Trentham station.

The platforms were retained for emergency egress from trains.

On 3 July 2019, a derailed goods wagon damaged both tracks out of Wellington serving all lines apart from the Johnsonville Line and stopping most commuter services into Wellington; partial service was not restored until the next day. All the lines reduce to two or three lines in the Wellington rail yards, and a fourth line may be added in the future. Alterations to Kaiwharawhara Station so it could be used as an emergency Wellington terminal for the Hutt, Kapiti and Melling lines are to be completed in 2020. Available buses (c10) could then have run a shuttle service into Wellington, but were insufficient to run from the Hutt Valley or Kapiti stations.
