= Pomare railway station =

Railway station in New Zealand

Pomare
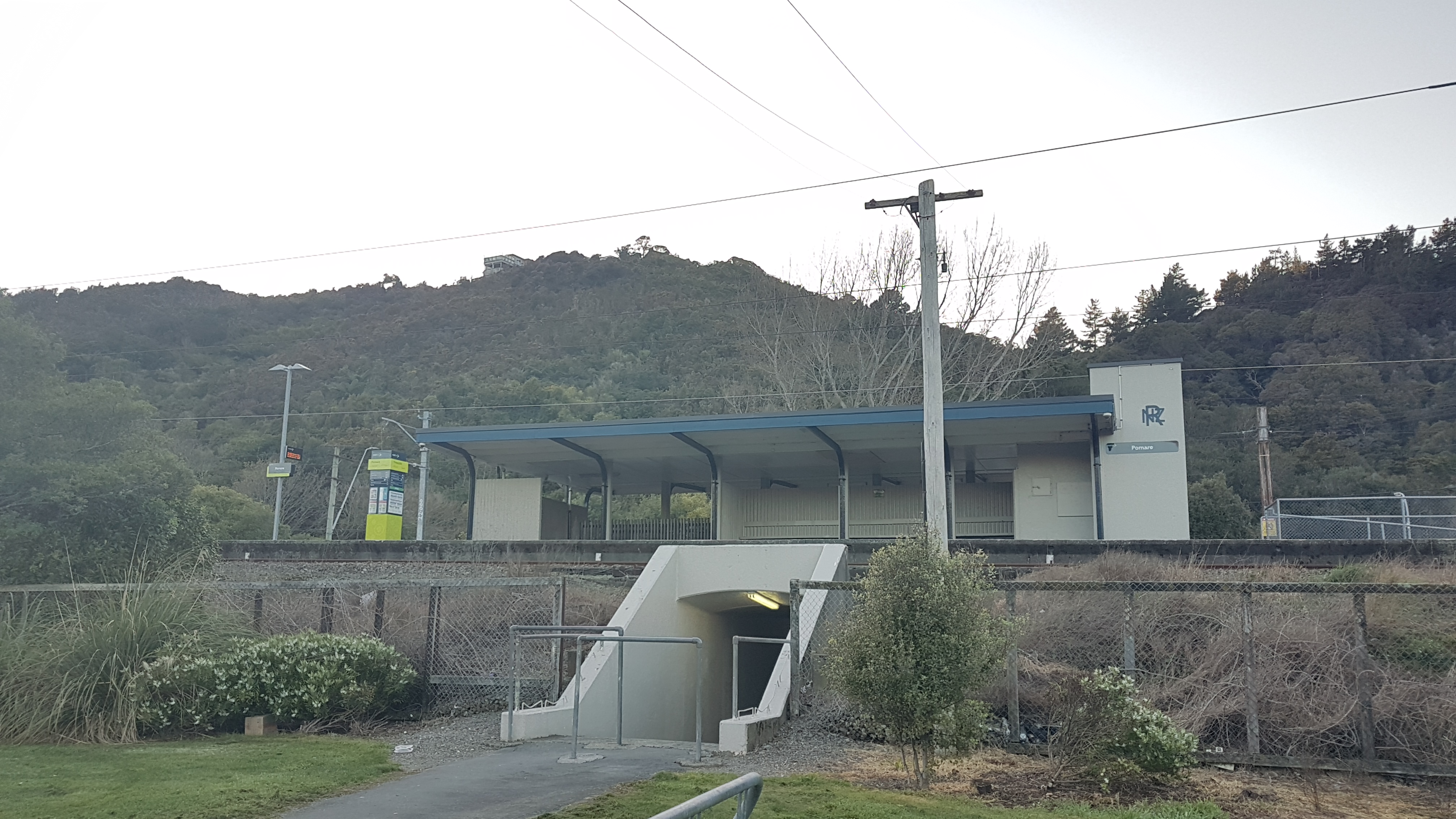
- Pomare railway station

General information
- Location: Eastern Hutt Road, Taita, Lower Hutt, New Zealand
- Coordinates: 41°10.159′S 174°58.189′E
- System: Metlink suburban rail
- Owner: Greater Wellington Regional Council
- Line: Wairarapa Line
- Platforms: Island
- Tracks: Main line (2)

Construction
- Parking: Yes

Other information
- Station code: POMA
- Fare zone: 5

History
- Opened: 9 August 1954; 72 years ago
- Electrified: 24 September 1955; 71 years ago

Services
Preceding station	Transdev Wellington	Following station
Manor Park towards Upper Hutt	Hutt Valley Line	Taitā towards Wellington
Location

Pomare railway station is an intermediate railway station in Lower Hutt, New Zealand, served by Metlink's electric multiple-unit trains of the "Matangi" FP class, on the Hutt Valley Line section of the Wairarapa Line.

The island platform station between double tracks serves the suburb of Pomare and provides the nearest rail connection for Stokes Valley.

== History ==
The then Hutt Valley Branch to Waterloo, opened 1927 and extended to Haywards (now called Manor Park) 1946–54, became the main route to Upper Hutt and the Wairarapa from 1 March 1954 with the closing of the Melling-Haywards section. Pomare opened soon after, on 9 August 1954.

In 2010, 42 new "park and ride" parking places were provided at Pomare, particularly for commuters from Stokes Valley.

== Services ==
The following Metlink bus routes serve Pomare station:

Previous Stop	Metlink Bus Services	Next Stop
Eastern Hutt Road towards Stokes Valley	121; Valley Heights	Eastern Hutt Road towards Gracefield
