= Tranz Metro =

Defunct New Zealand railway operator

Overview
- Owner: KiwiRail
- Locale: Wellington Region, New Zealand
- Transit type: Suburban rail
- Number of lines: 5
- Number of stations: 49
- Annual ridership: 11.6 million (2013-14)
- Headquarters: Wellington railway station, Wellington

Operation
- Began operation: 4 July 1938 (electric trains introduced in Wellington); 1984 (Cityrail created); 18 October 1995 (Renamed Tranz Metro)
- Ended operation: 2 July 2016 (replaced by Transdev Wellington)
- Number of vehicles: 166

Technical
- System length: 154 km (96 mi)
- Track gauge: 1,067 mm (3 ft 6 in)
- Electrification: 1,500 V DC overhead catenary (95 km or 59 mi)

Tranz Metro (formerly Cityrail and before that Cityline) was a New Zealand public transport operator. Beginning as the New Zealand Railways Corporation's Cityline division as a result of restructuring in the 1980s, in its final form Tranz Metro was the operator of Metlink's suburban trains owned by the Greater Wellington Regional Council in the Wellington Region of New Zealand.

Since 3 July 2016, Wellington's commuter rail services have been operated by Transdev Wellington.

== History ==
Suburban passenger rail services in Auckland and Wellington were a part of the New Zealand Railways Department, while bus services were owned either by city corporations or Railways Road Services. With the restructuring of the department into the New Zealand Railways Corporation in 1982, the Auckland suburban rail operation was branded "Cityrail Auckland" from 1984 and later in the mid 1980s, suburban bus and rail services were branded Cityline as part of the Corporation's Rail Passenger Group. Further restructuring of the rail network came in 1991, and the suburban rail operations were renamed "Cityrail" after they were transferred to New Zealand Rail Limited in 1991. That year the Auckland Regional Council bought the Auckland Cityrail fleet and contracted New Zealand Rail to run it, extending the contract until 1993 and again for 10 years until 2003.

In 1993, New Zealand Rail Limited was privatised, renamed Tranz Rail in 1995, with Cityrail rebranded Tranz Metro. On 15 December 2000, as part of management changes at Tranz Rail, the company split Tranz Metro into wholly owned subsidiaries Tranz Metro Auckland Ltd and Tranz Metro Wellington Ltd, with the intention of selling them. Stagecoach New Zealand and Greater Wellington Regional Council (GWRC) announced their intention to bid for the Wellington company, but both were barred by the Commerce Commission from doing so. Tranz Rail did not bid for the Auckland contract when it expired in 2003. Connex (later Veolia and now Transdev) won the contract, and took over from 23 August 2004. Tranz Metro Wellington reverted to a business unit of Tranz Rail, with new contracts being signed with GWRC in 2006 for network access, rolling stock maintenance and service delivery. The contracts expired in 2016.

In 2004, Toll Holdings bought a majority shareholding in Tranz Rail and renamed the company Toll NZ, and on 1 July 2008, it was bought (less the Tranz Link trucking and distribution arm) by the government and renamed KiwiRail. In October 2009, Cabinet agreed on a Metropolitan Rail Operating Model, which requires the operating contracts for metropolitan rail operations to be "contestable". This is in line with Auckland's rail contract.

An agreement signed in July 2011 transferred ownership of KiwiRail's station buildings, excluding Wellington railway station, to the GWRC, along with the D/DM class and EM/ET units (the FP/FT units were already owned by GWRC). KiwiRail retained ownership of the tracks, platforms, electric traction and signalling systems. The assets were valued at $107.5 million. Ownership of the fleet transferred on 1 July 2011 to Greater Wellington Rail Ltd, formed by Greater Wellington Regional Council in 2006.

In 2014, Transdev announced its intention to bid for the operations contract when it came up for renewal in 2016. The contract was awarded to a partnership between Transdev and Hyundai Rotem effective from July 2016. With the end of the Wellington contract, Tranz Metro disappeared, and the council re-branded services, tickets and stations Metlink in 2016.

=== Operations ===
Schematic map of the Metlink rail network, operated by Tranz Metro

Metlink trains are operated under contract from the GWRC, which subsidises the operation and owns station buildings and rolling stock. Typically, 60% of that subsidy comes from central government through the NZ Transport Agency (formerly Land Transport New Zealand), which approves such funding after analysis of the economics and net benefits, the remainder coming from the GWRC. Public consultation in 2005–2006 resulted in some changes of emphasis in the new contract, which runs for ten years from June 2006. The September 2006 fare rises and section changes were stated to part-pay for a major upgrade of trains and facilities over the next few years in conjunction with regional bus service improvements.

=== Rolling stock ===
Rolling stock as at 2 July 2016:

Image	Class	Type	Number	Seats	Routes operated	Introduction
	FP class Matangi	electric multiple unit	83× 2-car sets	149	Kapiti Line; Melling Line; Hutt Valley Line; Johnsonville Line	2011–16
	SW class	passenger carriage	12× SW; 3× SWG; 3× SWS	64 (SW); 37 (SWG/SWS)	Wairarapa Connection	2007
	SE class	passenger carriage	4× SE; 1× SEG; 1× SES	64 (SE); 37 (SEG/SES)	Wairarapa Line; Kapiti Line (former); Hutt Valley Line (former)	2008 (HVL and KPL, withdrawn 2011); 2013 (WRL)
	AG class	luggage van	1	-	Wairarapa Connection	2007
	DFB class	diesel-electric locomotive	5	-	Wairarapa Connection	2015

==== Former rolling stock ====
Image	Class	Type	Number	Seats	Routes operated	Introduction	Withdrawal
	EM/ET class Ganz Mavag	electric multiple unit	44× 2-car sets	148	Kapiti Line; Melling Line; Hutt Valley Line	1981–82	2011–16
	DM/D class English Electric	electric multiple unit	49	132	Hutt Valley Line; Johnsonville Line	1938–1954	1983–2012
	EO class	electric locomotive	3	-	Kapiti Line; Hutt Valley Line	2008	2011
	EW class	electric locomotive	7	-	Kapiti Line; Melling Line; Hutt Valley Line; Johnsonville Line	1952	1988
	NZR 56-foot carriage	passenger carriage		up to 56	Kapiti Line; Melling Line; Hutt Valley Line; Johnsonville Line; Wairarapa Connection	1937–1945	1988 (except Wairarapa and Capital Connection); 1998 (Capital Connection); 2007 (Wairarapa Connection)
	DC class	diesel-electric locomotive	4	-	Wairarapa Connection	1978–80	2015

=== Upgrades ===
In 2008-2011, KiwiRail and GWRC undertook a major upgrade of the Metlink network, dubbed the Wellington Regional Rail Programme (WRPP). The $390 million programme included:

- The purchase of 48 two-car electric multiple units, the "Matangi" FP/FT class, to replace the aging DM/D class units and to increase capacity.
- Upgrading the electrification system, including refurbishing the overhead lines and masts and 12 new substations to increase electrical supply for the Matangi units.
- Upgrading the signalling system, including replacing control systems and signal wiring and hardening the track circuits from interference with the electrification.
- Upgrading platforms at several stations to accommodate Matangi units and longer train lengths.
- Upgrading the Johnsonville Line to accommodate both Ganz Mavag and Matangi units, by improving the loading gauge in the tunnels and under some bridges.
- Lengthening the three crossing loops on the Johnsonville Line to take longer trains.
- Double-tracking the Kapiti Line from Mackays Crossing through Paraparaumu to just south of Waikanae, to increase capacity. (The double track stops short of Waikanae Station to avoid the cost of building second bridges over State Highway 1 and the Waikanae River.)
- Electrifying the Kapiti Line from Paraparaumu to Waikanae.
- Adding additional stabling storage at Paekakariki and Waikanae for the Matangi and Ganz Mavag units.
- Installing a third, bi-directional, line into between Wellington Station and the Kapiti/Hutt Valley line junction to ease congestion at peak times.

Work started on the programme in 2008, and was largely completed in February 2011.

== Funding ==
In 2011/2012, Tranz Metro had annual operational expenses of $80.437m, and revenues of $80.442m. Most revenue (47% or $37.8m) comes from fares, 22% or $17.69m comes from Wellington Regional Council rates, and 30% or $24.13m from NZ Transport Agency public transport funding.

== See also ==
- Rail transport in New Zealand
- Public transport in the Wellington Region
- List of Wellington railway stations
- List of rapid transit systems
