= Woburn railway station =

Railway station in New Zealand

Woburn
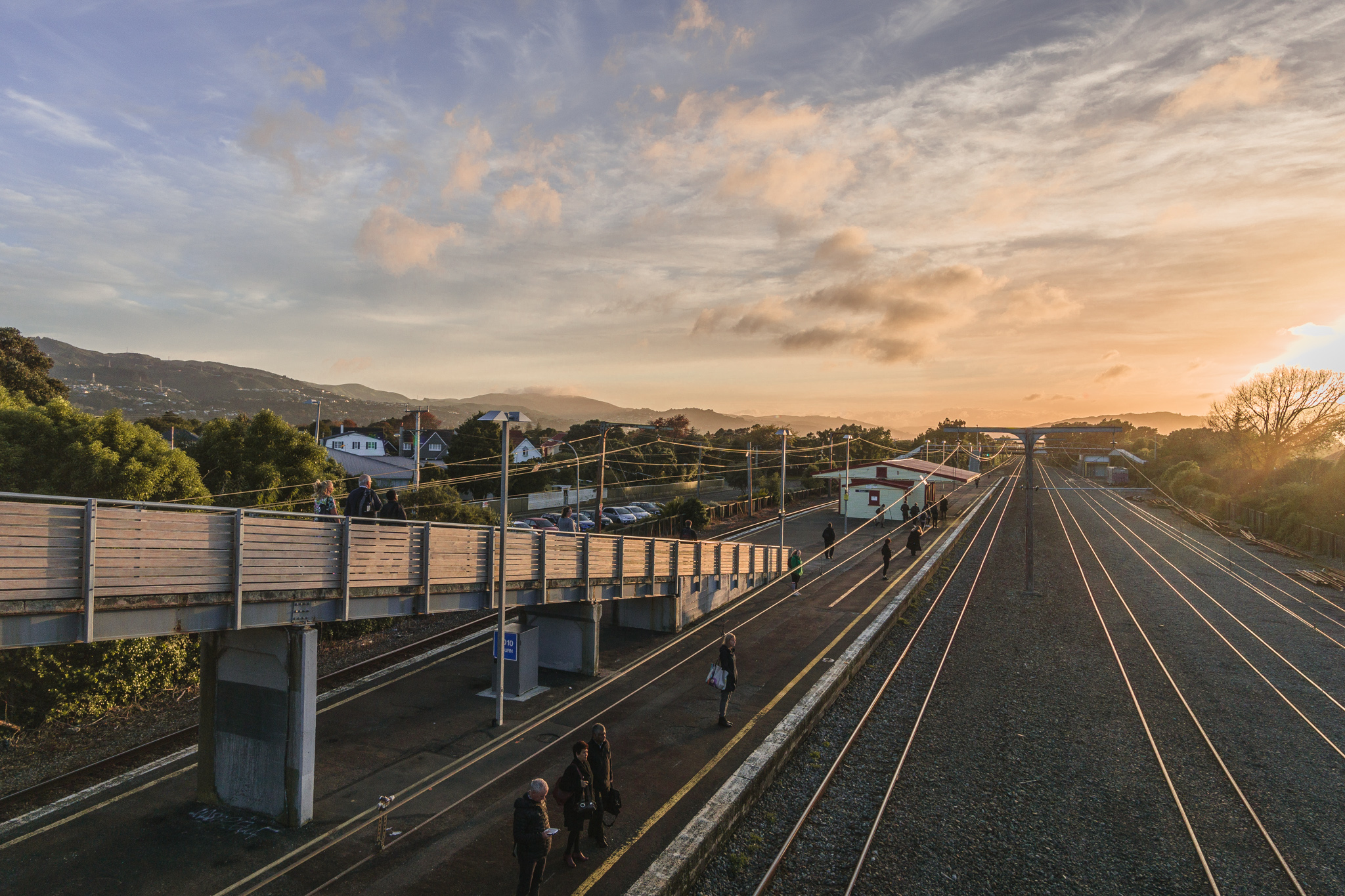

General information
- Location: Pohutukawa Street, Woburn, Lower Hutt, New Zealand
- Coordinates: 41°13′14.51″S 174°54′40.22″E
- System: Metlink suburban rail
- Owner: Greater Wellington Regional Council
- Line: Wairarapa Line
- Platforms: Island
- Tracks: Main line (2)

Construction
- Parking: Yes

Other information
- Station code: WOBU
- Fare zone: 4

History
- Opened: 27 May 1927; 99 years ago
- Rebuilt: c.1955; 71 years ago 1994; 32 years ago (after fire damage)
- Electrified: 14 September 1953; 73 years ago

Services
| Preceding station | Transdev Wellington | Following station |
|---|---|---|
| Waterloo towards Upper Hutt | Hutt Valley Line | Ava towards Wellington |
Location

Woburn railway station is a suburban railway station serving Woburn and Waiwhetu in Lower Hutt, New Zealand. The station is located on the Hutt Valley section of the Wairarapa Line, 14.4 km (8.9 mi) north of Wellington, and is the junction for the Gracefield Branch to the Hutt Railway Workshops, which diverges eastward from the mainline to the south of the station. Woburn is served by Metlink on behalf of the Greater Wellington Regional Council, with trains stopping at Woburn travelling to Wellington, Taitā and Upper Hutt.

The station has an island platform between double tracks.

== History ==
The station was one of the three new stations on the then Hutt Valley Branch opened on 26 May 1927. From 1 March 1954 with the closing of the Melling-Haywards section, this route became the main route to Upper Hutt and the Wairarapa.

Woburn station was rebuilt at the time of electrification (c1955). The old Waterloo building was added to the existing Woburn building. Woburn had four sidings to provide shunting space for trains reversing when travelling to or from the workshops, but why a triangle was never built between the two lines has never been fully explained (Hoy).

Woburn was initially an interchange for bus and rail services, but in 1986 the Hutt Valley Transport Study decided that Waterloo was a more logical choice. Waterloo was closer to centres of residential and commercial interest, had sufficient room for bus platforms to be installed, and was not burdened with other operational requirements such as Woburn being the junction with the Gracefield Branch, with its loops and sidings. The new interchange facility at Waterloo was opened on 26 November 1988 and fully integrated with all the new public transport routes and timetables by the following March.

In 1994, the station was damaged in an arson attack and subsequently rebuilt. Before the fire, the yard points could be controlled from the station. They were damaged beyond repair and it is understood they have been hand wound since. The rebuilt station also added a covered waiting area, which had previously been boarded up and unable to be used for several years.

In 1994 repair and prefabrication or prewiring of signalling equipment was transferred from the Kaiwharawhara railway station to Woburn.

Before the fire, the building had had a waiting area, ticket selling area and toilets. The toilets appear to remain, but locked long out of use.

== Services ==
No Metlink bus routes connect to Woburn Station directly, although the following pass by closely:

| Previous Stop | Metlink Bus Services | Next Stop |
|---|---|---|
| Ludlam Crescent towards Courtenay Place | 83; Eastbourne via Lower Hutt | Randwick Road towards Eastbourne |
| Ludlam Crescent towards Naenae | 130; Naenae | Randwick Road towards Petone |
