= Hutt Valley Line =

Train service in New Zealand

Coordinates: 41°12′49.77″S 174°55′15.95″E

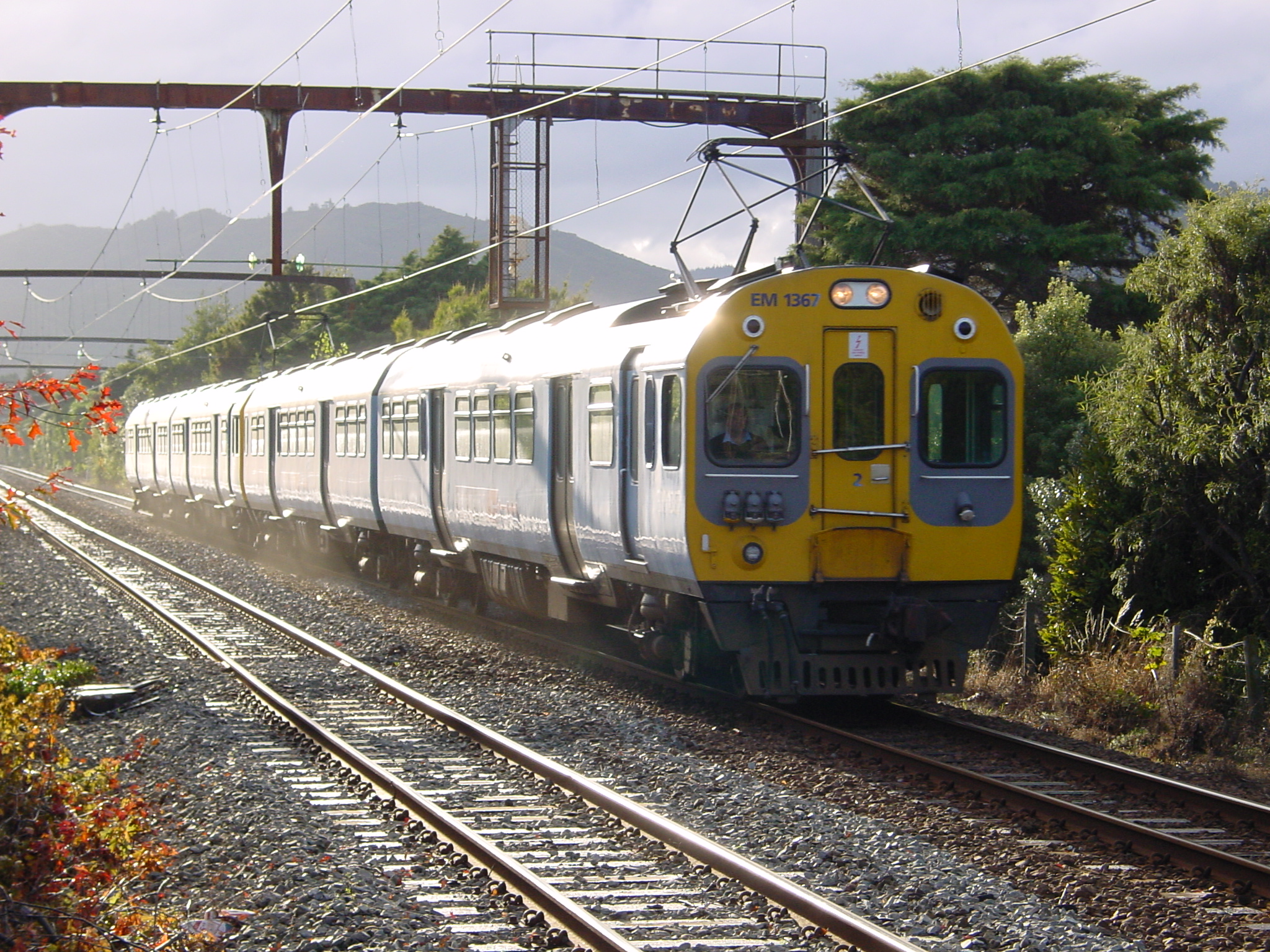
- Ganz-Mavag EM 1367 leading a southbound 4-car set, near Epuni on the Hutt Valley Line in 2003.

Overview
- Status: Open
- Owner: KiwiRail (track); Greater Wellington Regional Council (stations)
- Locale: Hutt Valley, New Zealand
- Termini: Wellington; Upper Hutt
- Stations: 18

Service
- Type: Commuter rail
- System: Metlink
- Route number: HVL
- Operator: Transdev Wellington
- Rolling stock: FP/FT class EMUs
- Ridership: 4,976,000 per annum (2011-2012)

Technical
- Line length: 32.4 km (20.1 mi)
- Character: Urban
- Track gauge: 1,067 mm (3 ft 6 in)
- Electrification: 1,500 V DC overhead catenary

The Hutt Valley Line is the electrified train service operated by Transdev Wellington on behalf of Metlink on the section of the Wairarapa Line railway between Wellington and Upper Hutt, New Zealand.

== History ==
=== Construction ===
The Hutt Valley line was the first railway out of Wellington, preceding the Wellington and Manawatu Railway Company's west coast route, which was later acquired by the New Zealand Government Railways and incorporated into the North Island Main Trunk. The first proposal for a railway line from Wellington to the Rimutaka Range was put to the Wellington provincial government by Robert Stokes in 1858, and five years later the government gave support to the idea. In 1866, the government's investigating committee approved the line and the Wellington, Hutt Valley and Wairarapa Railway Ordinance was passed on 2 July 1866. It authorised a line to be built to either gauge of 1,435 mm (4 ft 8 1/2 in) standard gauge, or a narrow gauge of 3 ft 6 in (1,067 mm); but sufficient funds could not be raised in England and the railway proposal was temporarily abandoned.

In 1870, Premier Julius Vogel included a railway from Wellington to the Wairarapa in his "Great Public Works" policy, and while in London to raise funds for a number of projects in this policy, he was approached by contractors Brogden & Sons. They received a contract to survey and construct the first portion of the line, from Wellington to Lower Hutt, and construction began on 20 August 1872, with the first sod turned at Pipitea in Wellington. The railway took longer to construct due to the difficulties associated with stabilising the shoreline of Wellington Harbour. In July 1873, the railway reached Kaiwharawhara, followed by Ngauranga in early 1874 and Lower Hutt on 14 April 1874. Steam locomotives had now arrived to work the line and service began, with four trains daily each way (three on Sundays).

Construction of the next section to Upper Hutt along the western bank of the Hutt River proceeded swiftly. On 11 May 1874, a contract was let to Charles McKirdy, and the line was opened to Silverstream in December 1875; this included a 272-metre bridge across the Hutt River just before Silverstream, and in other locations, thousands of bags of cement had to be used to stabilise the railway's route alongside the river. The line opened to Upper Hutt on 1 February 1876.

On 28 December 1877 the line to Kaitoke was officially opened by the Governor. On 1 January 1878 the line to Kaitoke was opened to the public; Kaitoke becoming the railhead for the Wairarapa for nearly ten months (to 16 October).

The section into the Wairarapa opened on 12 August 1878 to Featherston. This section descended the Rimutaka ranges via the Rimutaka Incline.

The Pipitea Point railway station terminus in Wellington was destroyed by fire on 16 January 1878, but remained open. A permanent replacement further south on Featherston Street opened on 1 November 1880; it was moved northwards to near the intersection of Thorndon and Lambton Quays in 1885 and later became known as Lambton railway station. It was replaced by the present Wellington railway station on Bunny Street in 1937.

The route alongside the harbour from Wellington to Lower Hutt was straightened and duplicated. The work was approved in 1903 by the Hutt Railway and Road Improvement Act, and began in 1904. From Lower Hutt it was completed to Petone (1905), Rocky Point (1906), Paparangi Point (1907), Ngauranga (1908), Kaiwharawhara (1909), and Wellington in 1911.

In the 1900s, a number of new stations and sidings were added: Trentham in 1907; Melling, Gosse and Co's siding, Pitcaithly's (station and siding), Belmont Quarry Co's siding (not to be confused with the Belmont railway station), Silverstream Bridge and Heretaunga in 1908.

=== Hutt Valley Branch ===
The original route was built along the western bank of the Hutt River and Wellington Harbour to provide a direct route from Wellington to the Wairarapa via Lower Hutt and Upper Hutt.

Automatic single-line signalling (APB) was introduced in 1922; from Wellington to Lower Hutt on 27 March and from Lower Hutt to Upper Hutt on 25 September. On 25 May 1927 signalling and interlocking on the double track Hutt Valley Junction to Waterloo (then a branch) was introduced. Later (1930s?) a switch-lock trailing crossover named Halfway was installed between Ngahuranga and Petone at Rocky Point, to allow single-line working when the seaward side (south) track was unusable because of southerly storms. But it was seldom used and was removed c1958 during track relaying. A single-person shelter was provided for the (unlucky) operator, and was still there in 1998.

In 1924, an extension of about 9 miles 34 chain (15.2 km) as the Wellington-Napier Line (Lower Hutt Valley Duplication) was authorised by the Railways Authorisation Act, 1924.

In 1925, the Hutt Valley Lands Settlement Act contained a provision for a branch line railway from Petone to Waterloo., known as the Hutt Valley or Waterloo Branch. Initially, a single line was planned, but as a substantial 233-metre bridge with 17 piers over the Hutt River at Ava was needed, and as it was to be the future mainline as the Western Hutt route could not be duplicated north of Melling, the new line was double track. It was built by the Public Works Department, and work started in April 1925, before the first sod had been turned by the Prime Minister Gordon Coates on 16 April 1925. Construction was simple with minimal earthworks, although industrial troubles in Britain delayed delivery of steel girders, and the temporary structure was nearly washed away by a flood. Three new stations at Ava, Woburn and Waterloo were built. The new line was opened by Coates, on 26 May 1927.

The Hutt Valley Branch was soon followed by the Gracefield Branch to the Railway Department's new Hutt Workshops on 1 April 1929.

In 1938, the Minister of Railways Dan Sullivan said that the extension and duplication of the line from Waterloo to Silverstream or Upper Hutt had not yet been considered by Cabinet. Prime Minister Savage had referred in June to proposed railway improvements on other lines.

=== Extension and electrification ===
After World War II, the Hutt Valley experienced significant population growth, especially with the establishment of state housing communities in Naenae and Taitā (then known as Taita), and extension of the Hutt Valley Branch to serve those two neighbourhoods was approved. Already built to Waterloo as double track, the next section to Naenae opened on 7 January 1946 initially as single track. On 14 April 1947 the line to Taitā opened, and the section from Waterloo to Naenae double tracked. The section from Naenae to Taitā was duplicated on 22 February 1953. A proposal to extend the Taitā line to link up with the original Hutt Valley main line had been approved in February 1946, and in the early 1950s this was carried out. On 28 February 1954, the section of the old main line between Melling and Haywards (now Manor Park) closed, leaving the Lower Hutt to Melling section as the Melling Branch. The following day, the new Taitā to Haywards section opened and the Hutt Valley Branch was incorporated into the Wairarapa Line. Initially single track, the section was duplicated on 19 July 1954.

Electrification had been approved in response to post-WWII coal shortages and was also implemented in the 1950s, with the first electrified section opened on 14 September 1953 from the North Island Main Trunk junction at Kaiwharawhara to Taitā. The old bridge over the Hutt River to Silverstream was found unsuitable for electrification and a deviation was built to the north over a new bridge. A direct line from Taitā to Silverstream through the Taitā Gorge with a tunnel had been proposed, eliminating the route across the river to Haywards and then back over at Silverstream, but the soil through the gorge was found unsuitable, and two bridges were built instead. Some of the original line replaced by the new route to Silverstream has been preserved by the Silver Stream Railway.

On 19 July 1954, the railway was duplicated to a point north of Haywards, and on 21 November a single track on the new Silverstream deviation was brought into use. Duplication from Haywards was completed to Trentham on 26 June 1955. On 24 July the electrification was completed to Upper Hutt and diesel-hauled suburban passenger trains north of Taitā ceased.

On 3 November 1955, the Rimutaka Incline was replaced by the Rimutaka Tunnel, speeding travel from the Hutt Valley to the Wairarapa. This involved re-routing the Wairarapa Line north of Upper Hutt. The Kaitoke route via Kaitoke and Summit in the Rimutaka Ranges at the western end of the incline was closed and replaced by a line through Maymorn to the tunnel.

=== 21st century ===
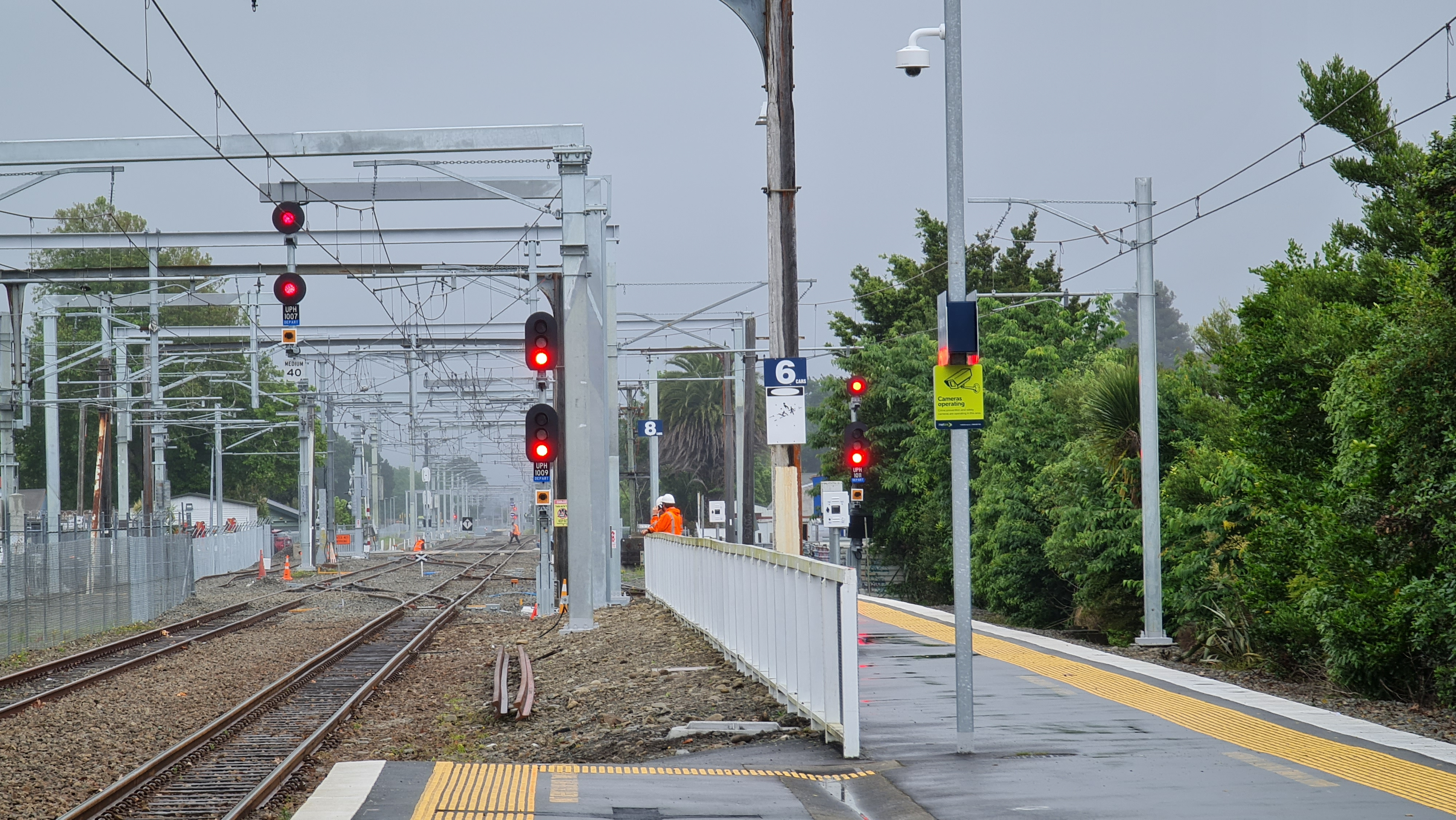
Commissioning of the new bi-directional signalling at Upper Hutt Station, 14 November 2021

In June 2013, the Hutt Valley line was cut on the evening of 20 June between Ngauranga and Petone by scouring beneath the line in several places during the storm of 20–21 June. Hutt Valley and Wairarapa lines services between Petone and Wellington were replaced by buses. KiwiRail had to rail in more than 1400 cubic metres of fill. Service was restored on the morning of 27 June.

Kaiwharawhara railway station was closed suddenly in June 2013 as it was discovered how badly corroded the overbridge was. In November 2013, the Greater Wellington Regional Council (GWRC) voted to close it permanently as on health and safety grounds, it was too expensive and nearly impossible to upgrade the station to provide step free access via ramps for disabled passengers.

Work on double-tracking the Trentham to Upper Hutt section started in November 2019. Initially projected to take eighteen months and to cost $300 million, the upgrading was completed (after two years) with the first trains running on 14 November 2021. Work carried out included upgrades to the Trentham and Wallaceville stations (to which the GWRC contributed $3 million), and to the Upper Hutt station. The section from Upper Hutt south to Trentham was equipped for bi-directional signalling so that trains can run on either track in either direction, with provision to later extend the bi-directional signalling to Heretaunga. The upgrades are expected to improve the operation of both suburban passenger trains to Upper Hutt and of the Wairarapa Connection, with a longer loop at Upper Hutt to hold Wairarapa log trains. On 15 November 2021, the second track between Trentham and Upper Hutt came into service.

In 2023 work started on the Te Ara Tupua section between Petone and Ngāūranga which will provide a wide cycleway and pedestrian path as well as more protection for the road and rail links. Concern has been raised about the death of five kororā (little blue penguins) which came ashore to nest. The project includes a bridge over the southern end of the line.

In 2024, the Hutt City Council found that the 1928 Cuba Street road overbridge over the Hutt Line was earthquake prone as it was only 19% of the Ultimate Limit State (ULS). It was to be fixed at an estimated cost of $2.1 million. The line carries 570,000 commuters and 370.000 tonnes of freight annually.

In April 2026 thefts of copper cable delayed more than fifty services and led to the cancelling of six services on the line. Similar thefts also occurred this year on the Kapiti Line.

== Operation ==
Seven traction substations along the line take electricity from Wellington Electricity's 11,000-volt distribution network and transform and rectify it to 1500-volt direct current for the overhead traction lines. The substations are located at Wellington, Kaiwharawhara, Petone, Woburn, Pomare, Silverstream, and Upper Hutt. There is also some supply from the Lower Hutt traction sub-station on the Melling line. Also along the line are three "cross-tie" substations at Rocky Point, Epuni, and Heretaunga, which provide a switching function but don't have transformers or rectifiers.

=== Passenger services ===
C, D, and L class steam locomotives operated the original route in the 1870s and 1880s.

In 1905, D 137 was utilised in trials on the Hutt Valley Line of a "railcar" service between Lower and Upper Hutt based on a concept the Railways Department's General Manager Thomas Ronayne had witnessed in the eastern United States. This involved D 137 hauling a carriage that seated 24 first class passengers and 48 second class passengers, and had a guard's compartment. It proved uneconomic and grossly over-powered, and accordingly, it was soon taken out of service and the Railways Department pursued research into genuine railcars, culminating in various classes covered by the general RM class designation.

On 11 December 1897, the Wairarapa Line was completed to its junction with the Palmerston North–Gisborne Line at Woodville, allowing the commencement of the Napier Express from Wellington through the Hutt Valley and Wairarapa to Napier in the Hawkes Bay. This provided the premier service on the Hutt Valley Line until early 1909, when it was re-routed via the west coast route that the Railways Department had recently acquired from the Wellington and Manawatu Railway Company. Its replacement was the Wairarapa Mail, an express train that ran the Napier Express's former Wellington-to-Woodville leg. Through the Hutt Valley, the express was typically hauled by W^{W} class tank locomotives. In 1936, the Wairarapa railcars started doing the Wairarapa runs, decreasing the frequency of the express and ultimately leading to its cancellation in 1948. No named provincial express has operated on the Wairarapa Line since this time.

In the 20th century, prior to electrification, W^{AB} and W^{W} class tank locomotives typically hauled suburban trains. Prior to full electrification, services beyond Taitā were hauled by DE class diesel locomotives. Full electrification saw duties shared between DM/D class "English Electric" multiple units and carriage trains hauled by ED and EW class electric locomotives, the latter class ordered for the Wellington electrified network when the Hutt Valley electrification project was approved. The EDs were withdrawn by 1980 and EWs by 1983.

In 1982-1983, the EM/ET "Ganz Mavag" multiple units were introduced, taking over most services, so that the DM/D multiple units used on the line since 1953 were used only at peak times. The introduction of the FP/FT "Matangi" class EMUs from 2011 provided extra passenger capacity, and enabled the remaining DM/D class EMUs to be withdrawn in 2012.

From 2016, trains have been operated by Transdev Wellington under the Metlink brand; previously Metlink commuter services were operated by Tranz Metro.

Trains run frequently along the line with stops at 17 stations. Off-peak services run every 20 minutes during the day, Half Hourly on Saturday and Sundays and hourly during the early morning and late evening, stopping at all stations. At peak times, two services run along the line every 20 minutes: the first starting at Upper Hutt and stopping at all stations to Taitā, then running express to Wellington stopping only at Waterloo; the second starting from Taitā and stopping at all stations to Petone, then running express to Wellington (only Melling Line trains serve Ngauranga during peak times).

Kaiwharawhara was closed suddenly in June 2013 as it was discovered how badly corroded the overbridge was. In November 2013, the GWRC voted to close it permanently as on health and safety grounds, it was too expensive and nearly impossible to upgrade the station to provide step free access via ramps for disabled passengers.

Metlink commuter trains running to and from Masterton in the Wairarapa – the Wairarapa Connection – augment the Hutt Valley Line service. They operate several times daily, using DFT class diesel locomotives and SW and SE class carriages.

=== Freight services ===
From December 1897, until the acquisition of the WMR in December 1908, the Wairarapa Line was part of the Railways Department's primary route out of Wellington. Once the west coast route of the North Island Main Trunk railway was available, all freight that could be diverted was sent via that line due to the costs and inefficiency of sending it over the Rimutaka Incline. Accordingly, the Wairarapa Line declined markedly as a freight route, though it became more desirable as a secondary route to the NIMT once the Incline was replaced by the Rimutaka Tunnel in 1955. Today, KiwiRail freight trains operate through the Hutt Valley between Wellington and Waingawa, south of Masterton. Non-revenue services are also operated regularly to transfer equipment to and from the Hutt Workshops. Since the demise of the ED and EW class, all freight trains have been operated by diesel locomotives.

== Double-tracking ==
In 2003, the Greater Wellington Regional Council proposed extending double-track from Trentham to Upper Hutt and extending electrification north of Upper Hutt to Timberlea and Cruickshank Road. The 2011 – 2012 Regional Rail Plan (RRP) proposed to start duplication work between Trentham and Upper Hutt in 2012. Double-tracking of the Trentham – Upper Hutt section was confirmed by GWRC in June 2014 with the adoption of the regional public transport plan.

In 2012, the Greater Wellington Regional Council decided to investigate extension of the electrification with Matangi trains north of Upper Hutt to a new station at Timberlea and north of Waikanae to Otaki (estimated cost $30 million for the Otaki project).

The 2013 Review and Draft 2014 Review of the Wellington Regional Public Transport Plan confirmed that a detailed analysis for a new station at Raumati (which was a "viability benchmark" for other new stations) showed that a new station there was not justified; that the modelled peak-hour patronage needed to be about 300 new passengers, and most Raumati users would have switched from Paraparaumu Station. Network extensions beyond the current Metlink rail operation limits would be by "shuttles or non-electrified services" running to Wellington.

Service improvements proposed in May 2017 included double-tracking the 2.7 km of line between Trentham and Upper Hutt; for which the GWRC was seeking government funding. Some traction poles on the Hutt Line required replacing "urgently". A power and signals failure in February 2018 was blamed on the power supply cable for signals dating from the 1950s (not actually from WWII). In December 2017, KiwiRail said that the proposed double-tracking from Trentham to Upper Hutt would delay proposals for a cycleway to Upper Hutt.

In 2018, KiwiRail announced that $49 million would be spent on upgrades and maintenance for the line, including double tracking the single line section from Trentham to Upper Hutt and replacing poles, overhead wires and signalling equipment. The work had started, and would be completed in 2021. The minister Phil Twyford announced on 9 October 2018 that the proposed $196 million for the region included $96 million for the Wairarapa Line; $50 million in the Wairarapa and $46.2 million south of the Rimutaka Tunnel including double-tracking the Trentham to Upper Hutt section. Work is to start in April 2019. Double tracking of the Trentham to Upper Hutt section ($46.2 million) will be completed in 2021, and track renewal and formation and drainage upgrades will be included. Resignalling of the Woburn Junction (2021; $2.08 million) will allow quicker access to the Gracefield Branch and Hutt Railway Workshops.

Work on double tracking the 2.5 km from Trentham to Upper Hutt was expected to take eighteen months, starting in October 2019. Hutt line traction plant work is to started about September 2019 and metro station construction work in March 2020.

Double-tracking from Trentham to Upper Hutt and other improvements at Trentham, Wallaceville and Upper Hutt stations were completed in November 2021.

== Stations from Wellington to Upper Hutt ==
Name	Code	km	Services				
Name	Code	km	O	U	T	M	W
Wellington	WELL	0.0	O	U	T	M	W
Ngauranga	NGAU	4.8	O			M	
Petone	PETO	10.5	O		T	M	W
Ava	AVA	12.5	O		T		
Woburn	WOBU	14.4	O		T		
Waterloo	WATE	15.5	O	U	T		W
Epuni	EPUN	16.5	O		T		
Naenae	NAEN	18.3	O		T		
Wingate	WING	19.5	O		T		
Taitā	TAIT	20.6	O	U	T		
Pomare	POMA	22.0	O	U			
Manor Park	MANO	23.7	O	U			
Silverstream	SILV	26.8	O	U			
Heretaunga	HERE	28.2	O	U			
Trentham	TREN	29.4	O	U			
Wallaceville	WALL	31.3	O	U			
Upper Hutt	UPPE	32.4	O	U			W

== See also ==
- List of Wellington railway stations
- Wairarapa Line
