= Petone railway station =

Railway station in New Zealand

Petone
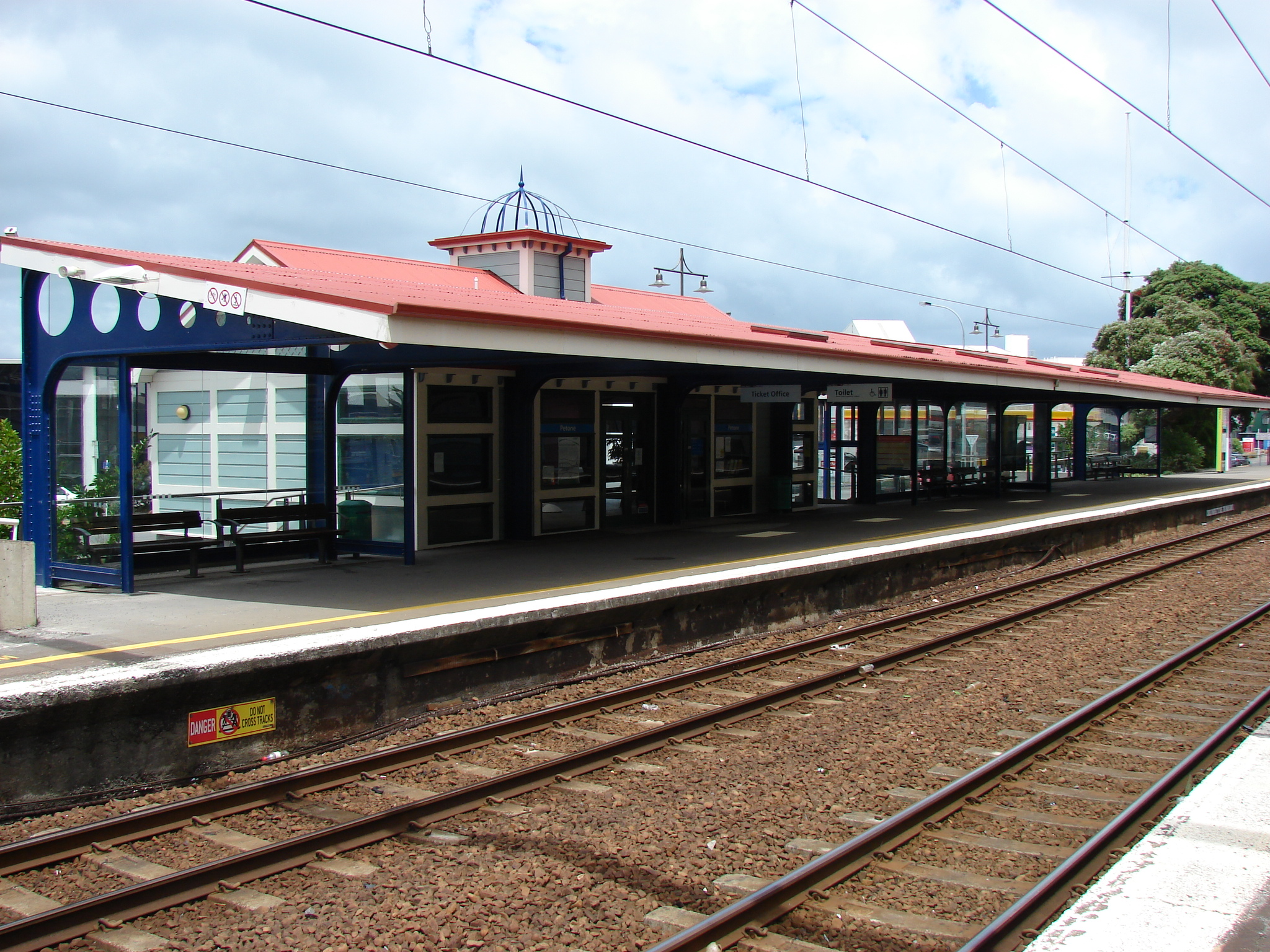
- Platform one and Ticket Office/Waiting Room

General information
- Location: Hutt Road, Petone, Lower Hutt, New Zealand
- Coordinates: 41°13′19.91″S 174°52′9.89″E
- System: Metlink suburban rail
- Owner: Greater Wellington Regional Council
- Lines: Wairarapa Line; Melling Branch
- Platforms: Dual side platforms (Formerly side and island)
- Tracks: Mainline (2)
- Connections: Bus services

Construction
- Parking: Yes
- Cycle facilities: Yes
- Accessible: y

Other information
- Station code: PETO
- Fare zone: 4

History
- Opened: June 1875; 151 years ago
- Rebuilt: October 2003 to March 2004; 22 years ago
- Electrified: 12 September 1953; 73 years ago
- Former names: Korokoro, Petoni

Services
Preceding station	Transdev Wellington	Following station
Western Hutt towards Melling	Melling Line	Ngauranga towards Wellington
Ava towards Upper Hutt	Hutt Valley Line	Ngauranga towards Wellington
Waterloo towards Masterton	Wairarapa Connection	Wellington Terminus
Location

Petone railway station is a dual platform, suburban railway station located in the Lower Hutt, New Zealand suburb of Petone. It is on the Hutt Valley section of the Wairarapa Line, 10.5 km (6.5 mi) north of Wellington, and is the junction for the Melling Branch to Melling, which diverges westward from the main line to the north of the station. The station is served by Metlink suburban services, operated by Transdev Wellington, to Wellington, Melling, Taitā, Upper Hutt and Masterton.

The station has two side platforms, linked by a pedestrian subway to the south and a pedestrian overbridge to the north, which also links west over State Highway 2 to Pito-one Road. A small bus interchange connects buses from Maungaraki and Korokoro to trains to and from Wellington. Other facilities include two park and ride carparks, a ticket office, waiting room, and cycle storage.

== History ==
The station is on the first section of the Wairarapa Line, opened between Wellington and Western Hutt (then Lower Hutt) on 14 April 1874. Despite this line running through what was to become Petone, it was not until the following year that a station was opened there.

=== First station ===
In June 1875 a flag station was opened near the Korokoro Stream, just north of the present station footbridge. It was named Koro-Koro as was the locality at the time.

=== Second station ===
In about 1879 a replacement station was established near the present site. Although closer to the populace it served, difficulty in accessing it led to most of the residents of the area signing a petition against the relocation.

The old station building was later removed and sited on the corner of Korokoro and Hutt Roads where it served as a Police lock-up for many years. It remained on site until 1964 when it was destroyed along with several other buildings in the vicinity.

=== Third station ===
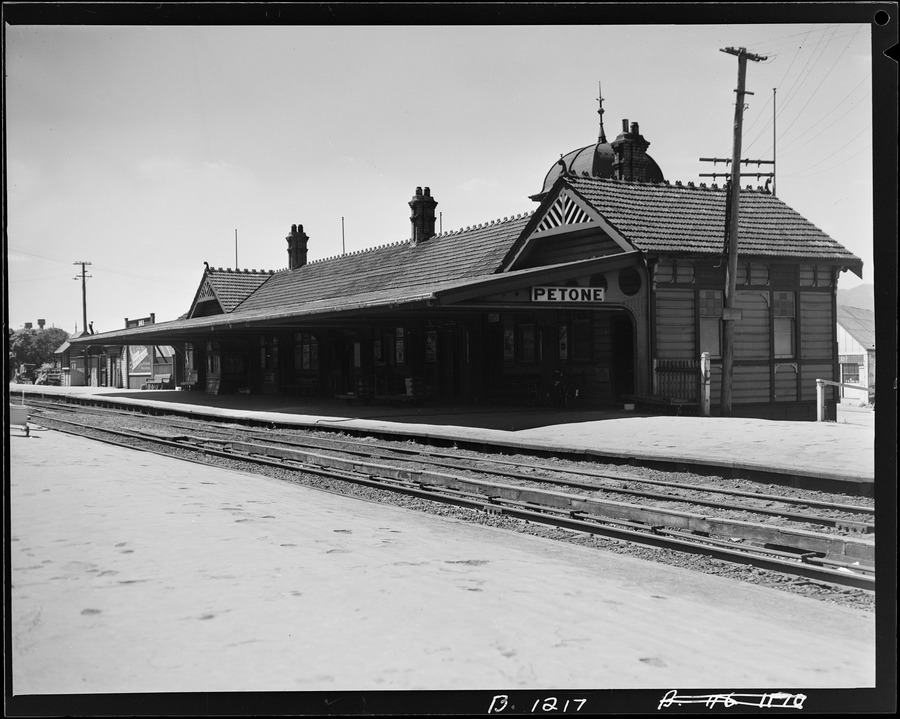
Petone railway station, March 1951

On 27 July 1905 a new station with a building designed by George Troup was inaugurated on a new site, when the new double main line between Petone Junction and Lower Hutt was opened. This new line passed by the Petone Workshops to the east, whereas the main line had previously been to the west of the workshops. The double tracking from Lower Hutt and Petone to Wellington authorised in 1903 by the Hutt Railway and Road Improvement Act was completed in stages between 1905 and 1911,

=== Modern developments ===
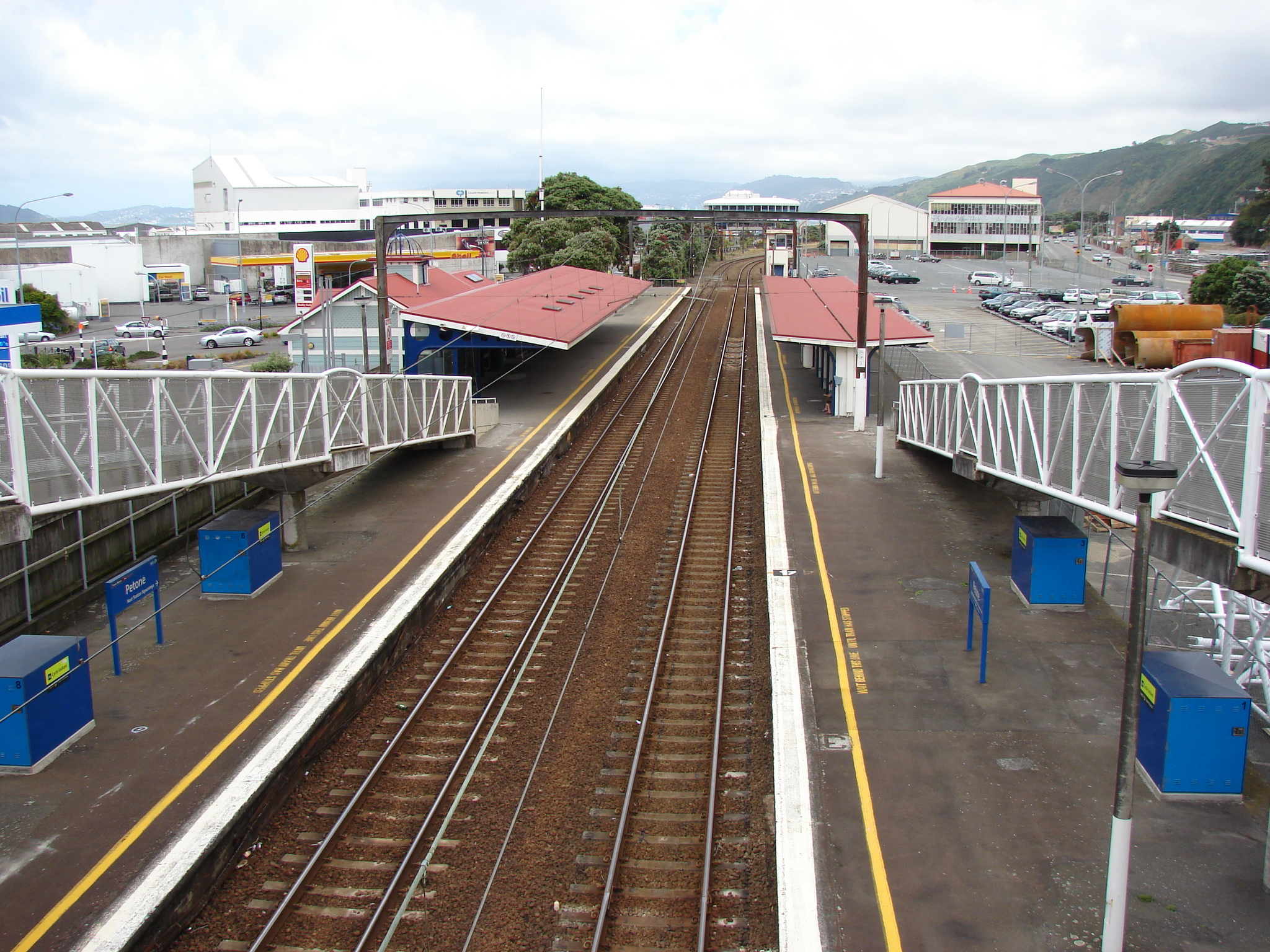
The station is bounded by Hutt Road (left, behind platform 1) and Western Hutt Road (right, behind the carpark). The blue boxes on the platforms are cycle storage lockers.

In 2000 preliminary investigations into a refurbishment of the station were begun, motivated by the Wellington Regional Land Transport Strategy, which had identified it as requiring such works by 2004.

The following year several options were considered and public input into the decision sought. The new facility had, as one of its design considerations, a bus interchange in light of the Hutt Valley Bus Review and the new bus routes that were introduced from October 2003.

The Hutt City Council agreed in 2003 to, for legal reasons, become the owner of the station and four tenders for the construction works were received. Construction commenced in June 2003 and, with the enacting of the Land Transport Management Act towards the end of 2003, it was decided that Greater Wellington Regional Council would become the owner of the station at the completion of the construction work.

The refurbished station was officially opened on 3 March 2004 and included the following amenities:

- New bus access
- Upgraded canopy
- Covered bus shelter area
- Re-sealed eastern platform
- Shelter screens for the southern end of the veranda
- Platform seating
- Ground lighting for restored historic flagpole

In the late 2000s, Transit New Zealand implemented the State Highway 2 Dowse to Petone Upgrade Project which involved some changes to the facilities and access at the station. The car park was extended south and a vehicle overbridge – Mackenzie Avenue – was built for car park users. The car park entrance for southbound traffic from State Highway 2 remains. Mackenzie Avenue connects Pito-One Road in Korokoro, from which motorists are able to travel north onto State Highway 2 via Priests Avenue, or access Hutt Road via the new Korokoro overbridge. This project also involved an upgrade for the pedestrian overbridge that links the station to the western side of State Highway 2.

Both platforms were upgraded in 2009 with new fronts, lights and hotmix as part of a programme of upgrades for the new Matangi EMUs. Platform 1 reopened to southbound trains on 7 December 2009 and the whole platform upgrade project was expected to be completed by Christmas 2009.

A new pedestrian underpass to the Petone to Wellington cycleway and walkway is to be built in 2020 or 2021.

=== Signal box ===
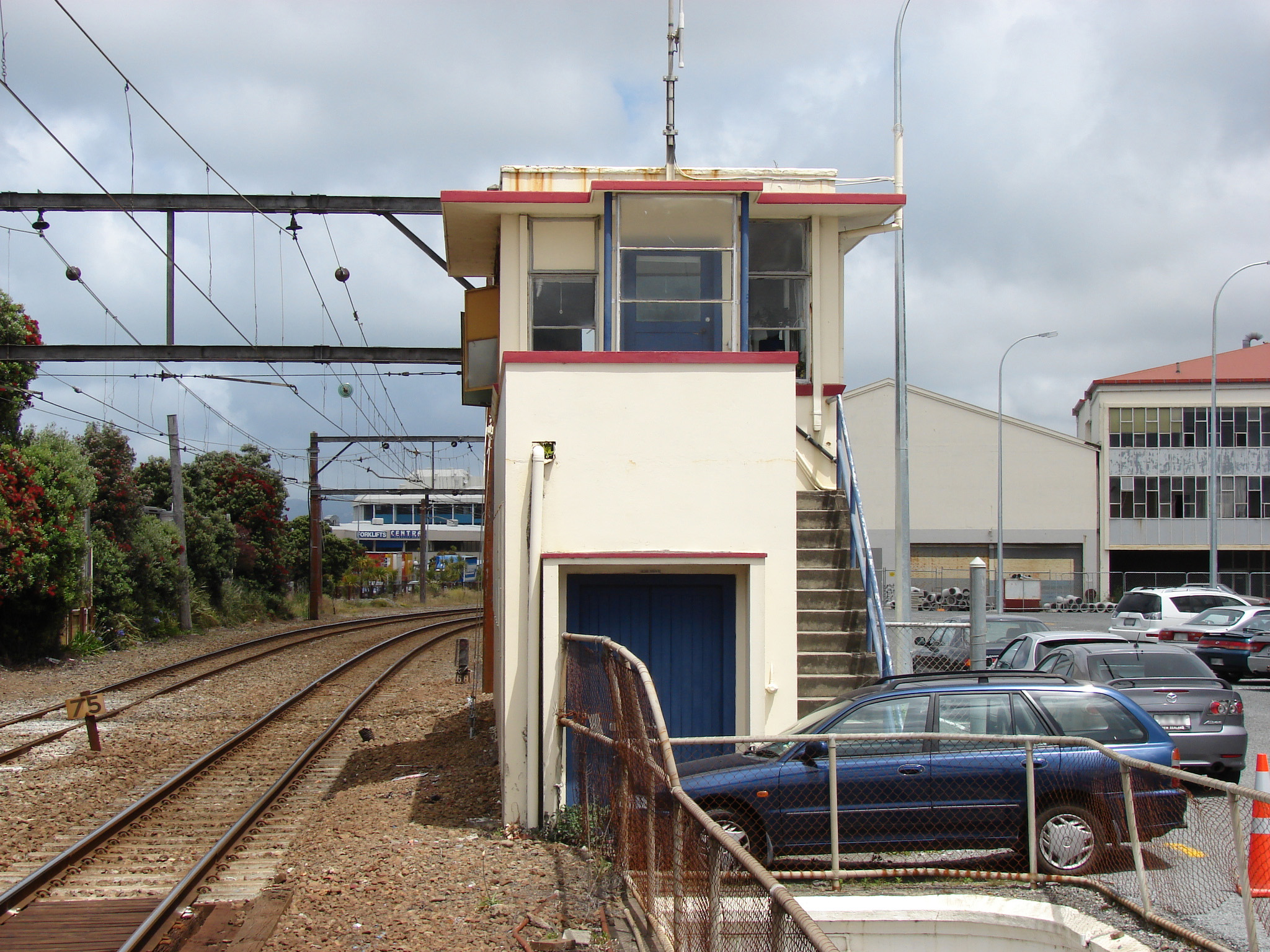
The Petone signal box

Petone had one of the last operational standalone signal boxes in New Zealand. The electric relay-based signal box on the south of the station was built in 1952 to replace the old 1905 mechanical signal box north of the station. It controlled the Melling Branch and its junction north of the station, and was usually only staffed while Melling Line trains were in operation (i.e. between 6:00 am and 7:00 pm, Monday to Friday). It was occasionally staffed in the evenings and at weekends when a block of line existed beyond the station, operating the crossovers to switch trains for their return journey. At other times when the Melling Line was closed, the box was switched out and the absolute interlocking (manual) signals between south of Petone and Ava protecting the junction became permissive block (automatic) signals by the presence of an "A" light on each signal.

In late 2013, work began to decommission the signal box and move Petone and Melling branch signalling to the National Train Control Centre in central Wellington. The signal box closed on 24 December 2013, allowing a block of line to take place and the signals switched over during the quiet Christmas/New Year period. The new signals came into use on 6 January 2014.

== Services ==
=== Rail ===
Tranz Metro, on behalf of the Greater Wellington Regional Council, operates Hutt Valley Line and Melling Line electric suburban services between Wellington and Upper Hutt or Melling via Petone. It also operates the Wairarapa Connection diesel-hauled service between Wellington and Masterton via Petone. The basic daytime off-peak timetable is:

- 2 tph Hutt Valley Line to Wellington, stopping all stations.
- 2 tph Hutt Valley Line to Upper Hutt, stopping all stations.
- 1 tph Melling Line to Wellington, stopping all stations (weekdays only)
- 1 tph Melling Line to Melling, stopping all stations (weekdays only)
- Two Wairarapa Connection services per day to Wellington, non-stop
- Two Wairarapa Connection services per day to Masterton, stopping Waterloo and all stations from Upper Hutt

The basic morning peak timetable is:

- 6 tph Hutt Valley Line and Melling Line to Wellington, split:
  - 3 tph stopping all stations
  - 3 tph non-stop
- 3 tph Melling Line to Melling, stopping all stations
- 2 tph Hutt Valley Line to Upper Hutt, stopping all station
- Three Wairarapa Connection services to Wellington, non-stop.

=== Bus ===
Metlink bus routes 81, 83, 84, 110, 130, 150 and 154 serve Petone station.

== Gallery ==
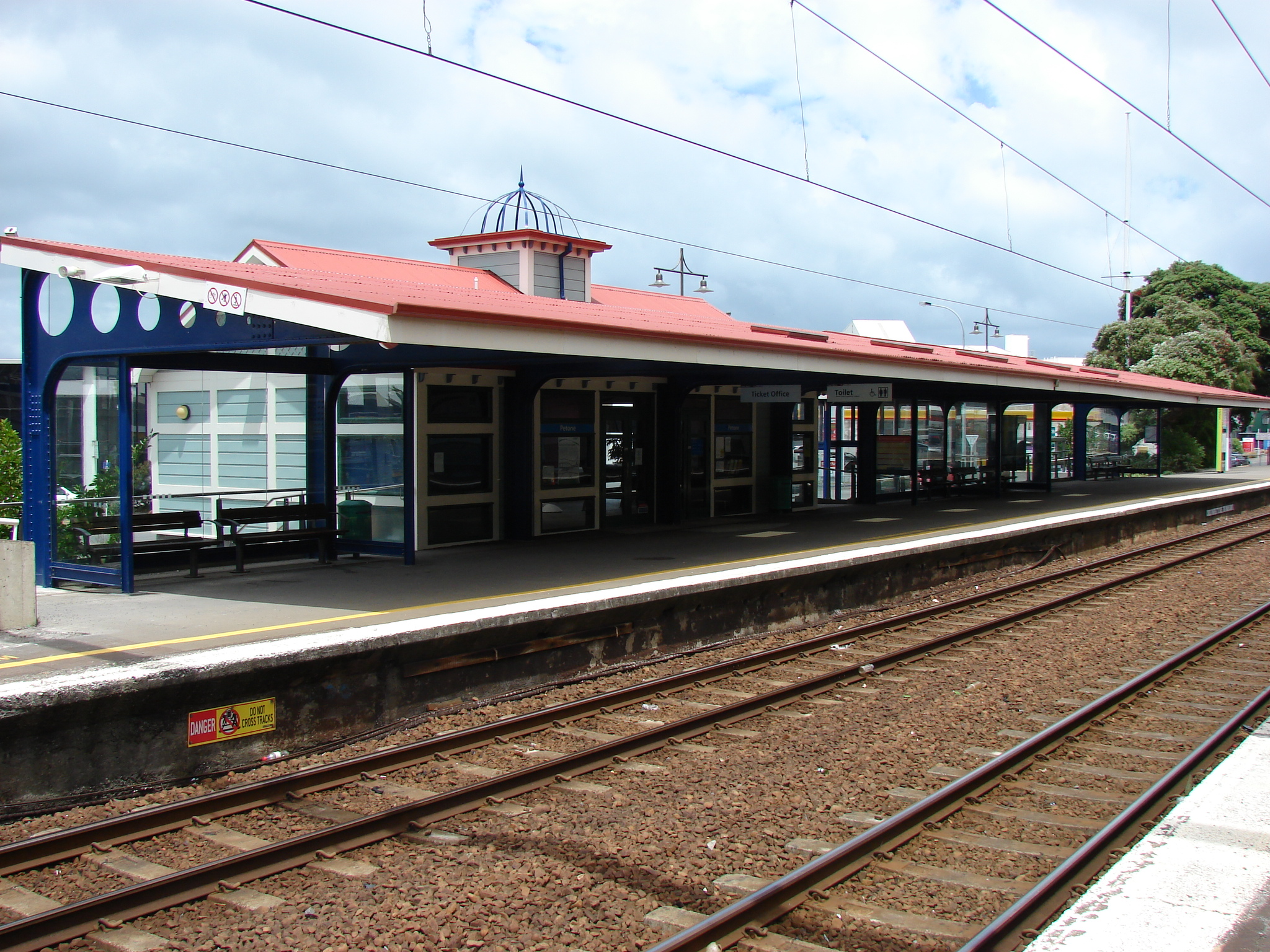
Platform 1, used by Down trains (to Wellington). The main station building is on this platform, housing the ticket office and passenger amenities. Access to Hutt Road and the bus terminal is also from this platform.

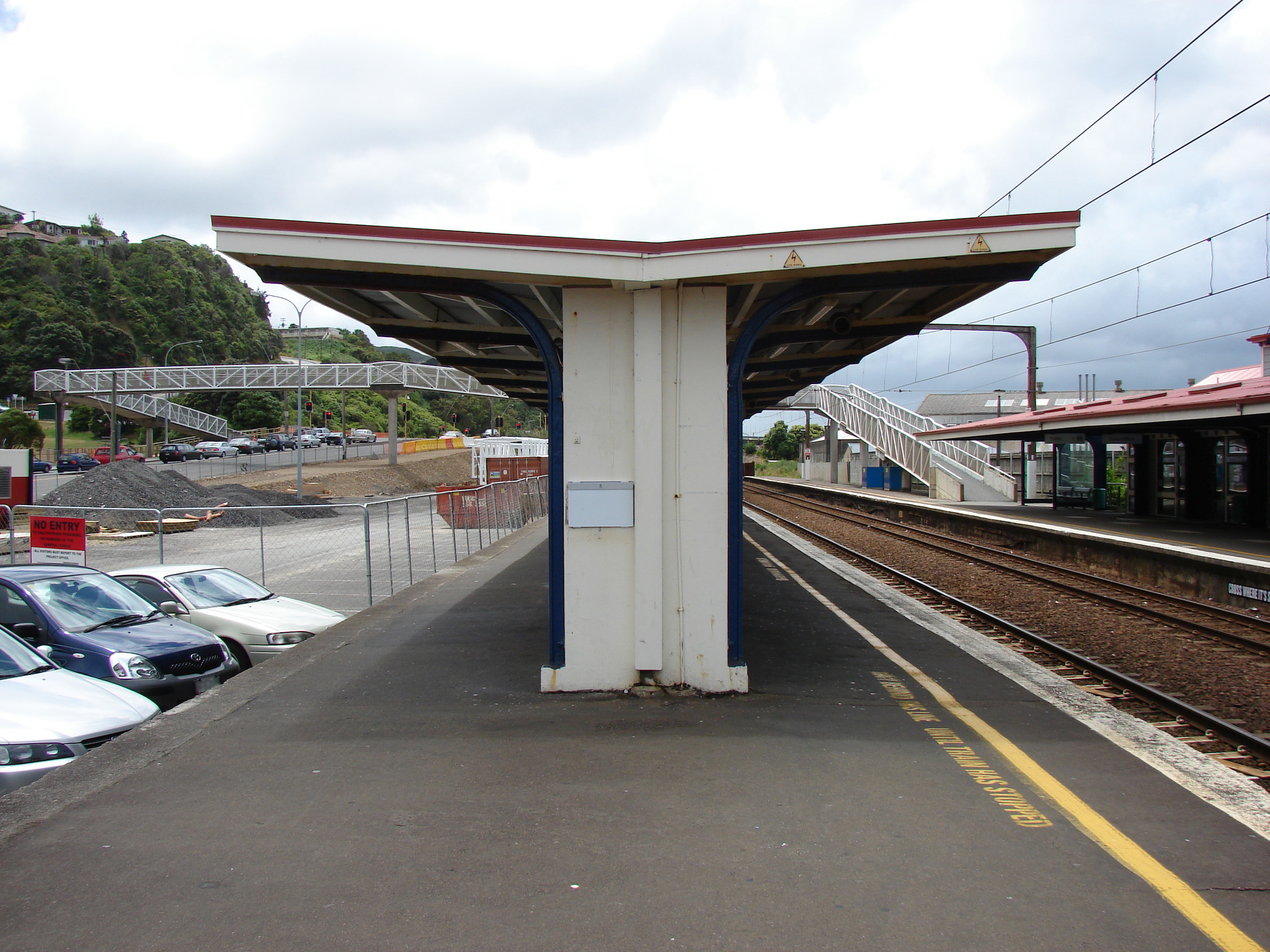
Platform 2 (right) used by Up trains (to Melling, Upper Hutt, Wairarapa). It used to be an island platform – the former platform 3 (left) now faces the car park.

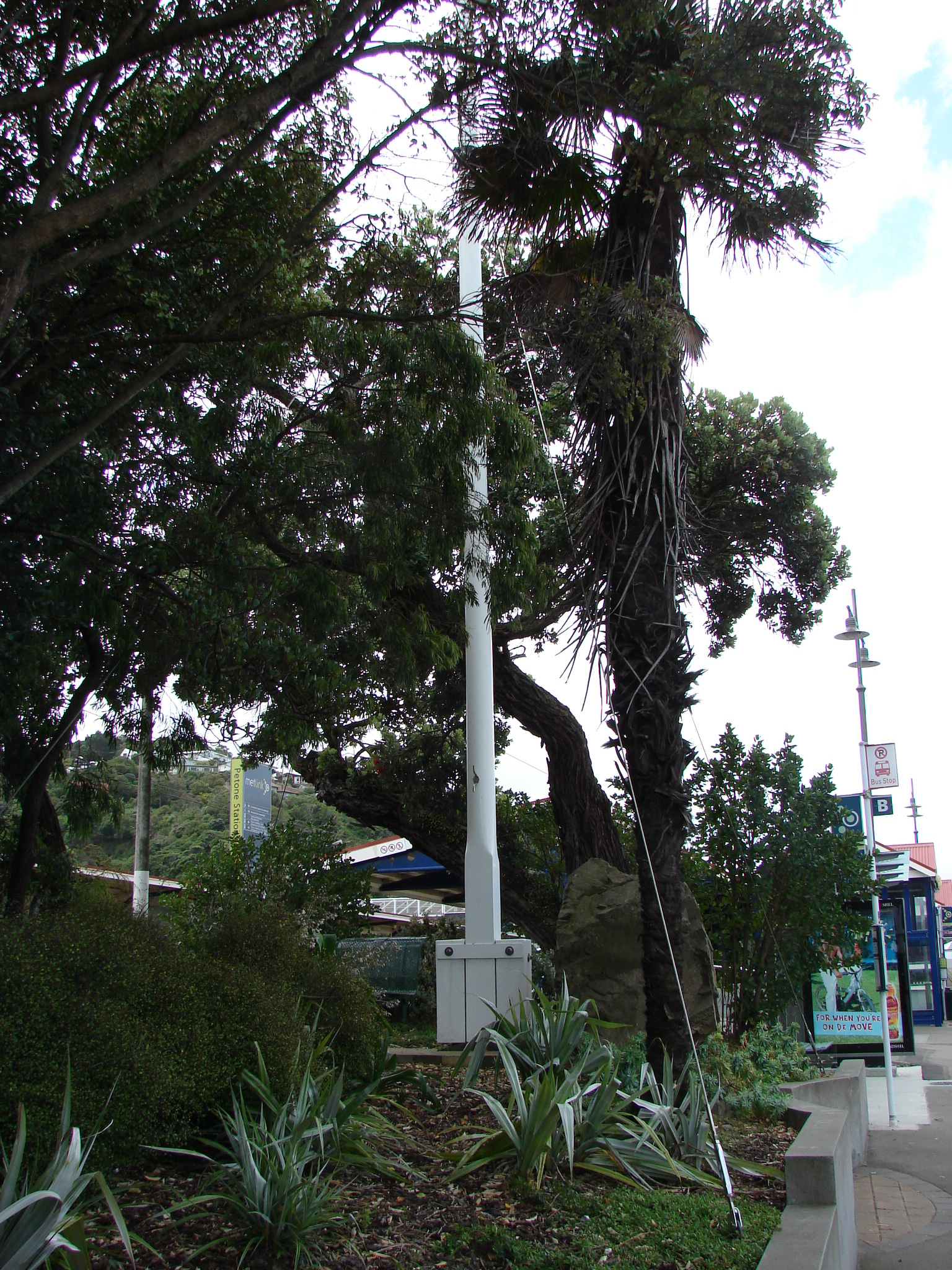
Historic New Zealand/Australia Railwaymen's flag pole.

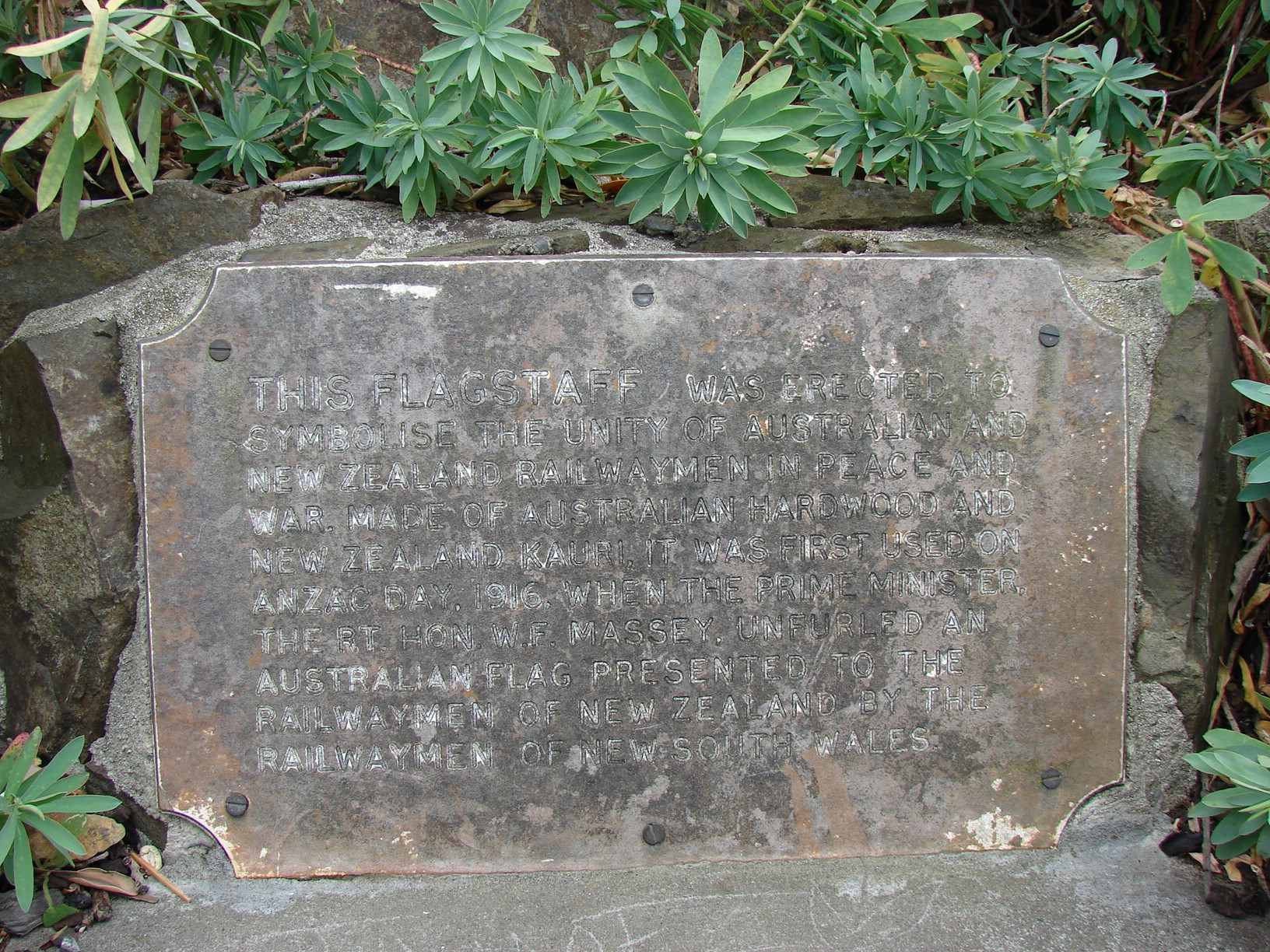
Dedication plaque for the flag pole.

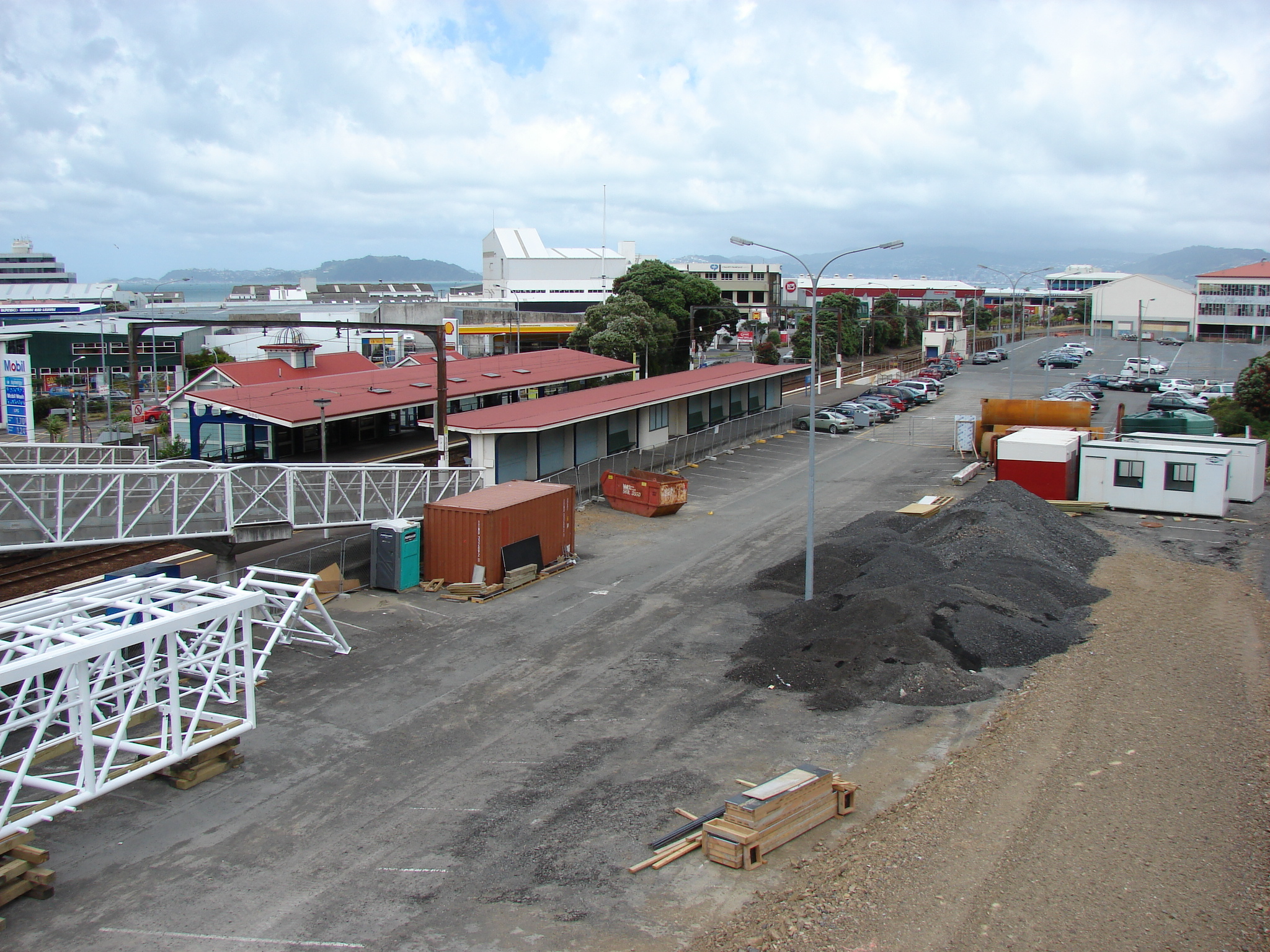
Carpark during State Highway 2 D2P upgrade project
