= Ava railway station =

Railway station in New Zealand

Ava
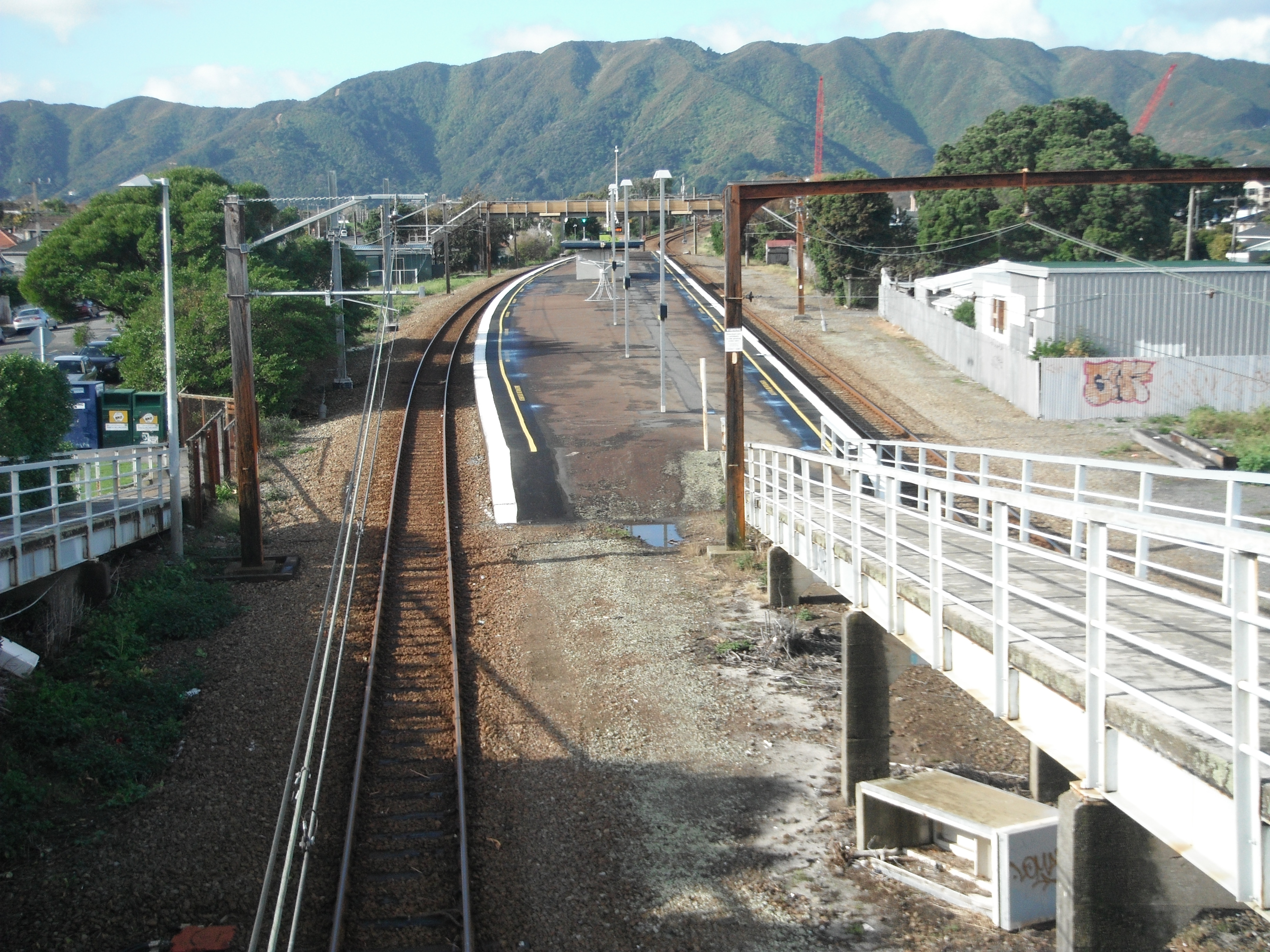

General information
- Location: North Street, Petone, Lower Hutt, New Zealand
- Coordinates: 41°13′10.52″S 174°53′30.06″E
- System: Metlink suburban rail
- Owner: Greater Wellington Regional Council
- Line: Hutt Valley Line
- Platforms: Island
- Tracks: Main line (2)

Construction
- Parking: Yes

Other information
- Station code: AVA
- Fare zone: 4

History
- Opened: 27 May 1927; 99 years ago
- Rebuilt: 1976; 50 years ago
- Electrified: 14 September 1953; 73 years ago

Services
Preceding station	Transdev Wellington	Following station
Woburn towards Upper Hutt	Hutt Valley Line	Petone towards Wellington
Location

Ava railway station is a suburban railway station serving parts of Petone and Alicetown in Lower Hutt, New Zealand. It is located in a residential area bordering these two suburbs, 12.5 km (7.8 mi) north of Wellington, and is part of the Hutt Valley Line. Services are operated by Transdev Wellington on behalf of the Greater Wellington Regional Council. Trains stopping at Ava run to Wellington, Taitā and Upper Hutt.

The station has an island platform between double tracks with a pedestrian overbridge at each end of the platform, connecting the station with Wakefield Street and Alicetown to the north, and North Street and Petone to the south.

== History ==
The station was one of the three new stations on the then Hutt Valley Branch opened on 26 May 1927. Provisionally referred to as "the Cuba Street station", it was eventually named Ava after another nearby street. From 1 March 1954 with the closing of the Melling to Haywards section, this route became the main route to Upper Hutt and the Wairarapa. Ava initially had sidings, which had been removed by 1970. In 1976, the original 1927 building was replaced by a new shelter.

On the night of 8 December 2014, a northbound "Matangi" FP/FT unit 4397 hit a downed traction pole at the station and became entangled in the overhead lines. No passengers or crew were injured, but the unit suffered frontal damage from the impact with the pole. Electric train services between Taitā and Petone were cancelled the following day while three traction poles and 150 metres of overhead line were repaired.

The western access ramp over the railway was found to require strengthening work in February 2016. It was later damaged in the 2016 Kaikōura earthquake on 14 November and, due to safety risks, was removed during the weekend of 17–18 December, leaving the station inaccessible by wheelchair, as the eastern access ramp only has stairs. The western ramp was rebuilt and reopened in October 2018.

== Services ==
Transdev Wellington, on behalf of the Greater Wellington Regional Council, operates Hutt Valley Line electric suburban services between Wellington and Upper Hutt via Ava. The basic daytime off-peak timetable is:

- 2 trains per hour to Wellington, stopping all stations
- 2 trains per hour to Upper Hutt, stopping all stations

No Metlink bus routes connect to Ava station directly, although routes 83 and 110 pass close by.
