= Melling branch =

Commuter Branch Line New Zealand

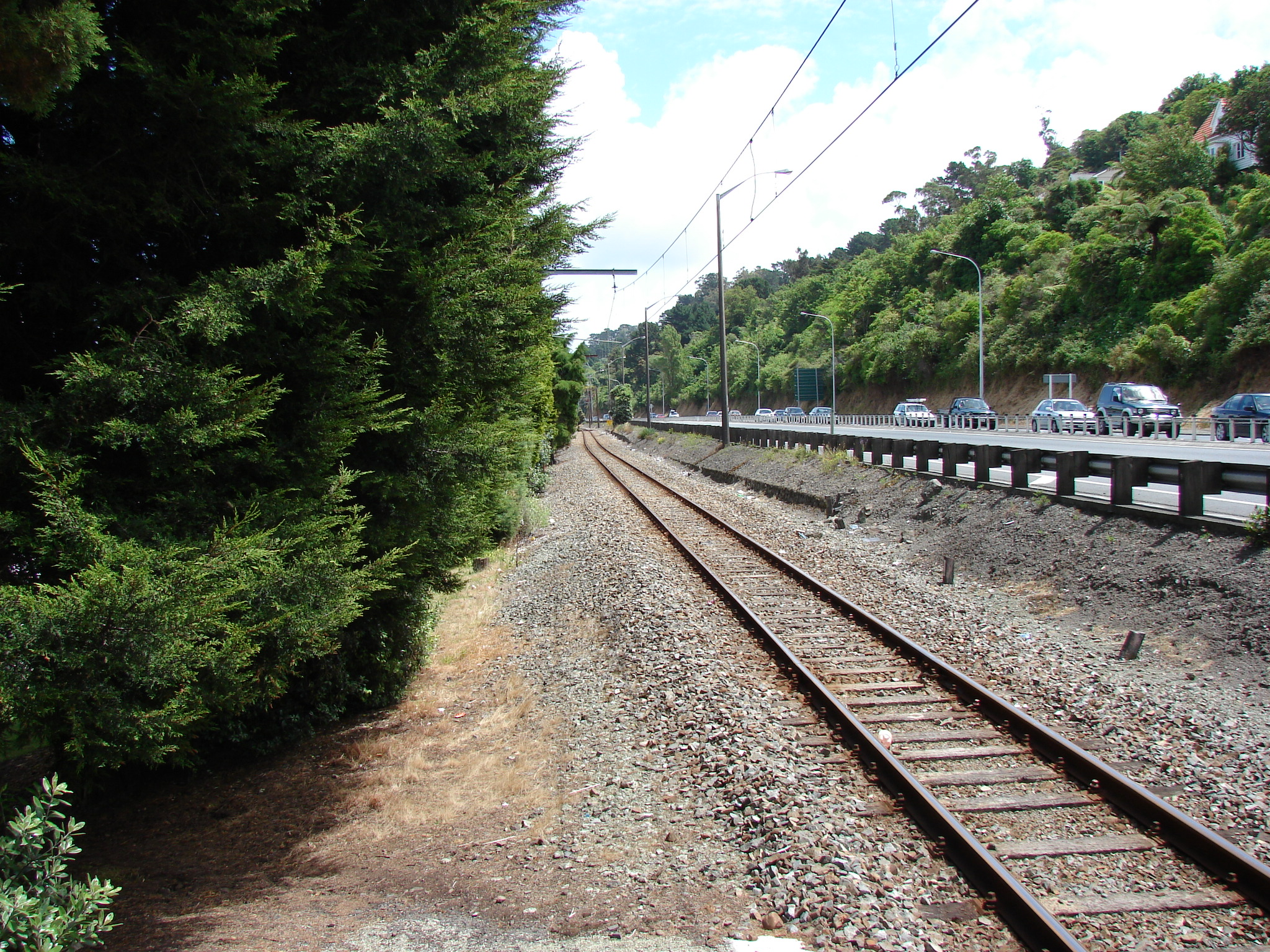
- The Melling branch runs beside Western Hutt Road (State Highway 2) for its entire length.

Overview
- Status: Open, passenger only
- Owner: KiwiRail (track); Greater Wellington Regional Council (stations)
- Locale: Wellington, New Zealand
- Coordinates: 41°12′13.12″S 174°54′18.94″E
- Termini: Petone; Melling
- Stations: 2

Service
- Type: Commuter rail
- System: Metlink
- Route number: MEL
- Operator: Transdev Wellington
- Rolling stock: Matangi class EMUs

History
- Opened: 15 December 1875; 150 years ago (as Wairarapa line); 1 March 1954; 72 years ago (as Melling branch)

Technical
- Line length: 2.99 km (1.86 mi)
- Character: Suburban
- Track gauge: 1,067 mm (3 ft 6 in)
- Electrification: 1,500 V DC overhead catenary
- Operating speed: 50 km/h (31 mph)

Map

The Melling branch is a railway branch line in the Hutt Valley, north of Wellington, New Zealand. It is part of the national rail network and formerly part of the Wairarapa line. Until 2010 it was one of only two passenger-only lines in the country (the second one being the Johnsonville line), since that year the two being joined by the Onehunga branch and later by the Manukau branch.

Services are operated by Transdev Wellington under the Metlink brand and marketed as the Melling Line. Matangi EMU trains run between Wellington and Melling from Monday to Friday.

The Melling Line is expected to close for up to eighteen months from July 2024 to enable the RiverLink flood protection project to proceed. A new Melling station is to be built 250m south of the existing station, which will be preserved as a heritage building.

== History ==
=== Construction ===
The colonial government of William Fox passed the Railways Act in 1870, which authorised the surveying of several railway lines including one from Wellington to the Wairarapa. Surveyor John Rochfort was hired by the Public Works Department to investigate four potential routes for this line and reported back with his findings at the completion of his trip. He recommended a line following the road between Wellington and Petoni [sic] on the seaward side, running up the western side of the Hutt Valley before crossing the Hutt River at Silver Stream [sic], heading north through Upper Hutt, up the Mungaroa [sic] and Pakuratahi Valleys, and over the Rimutaka Range to Featherston. The Public Works Department concurred with his assessment and tasked him with completing a more detailed survey including cost estimates.

Construction of the Wairarapa Line was authorised by the Railways Act of 1871. A further survey was commissioned and carried out between January and April 1872. The route of the line had been decided on in March but the Government, being cautious about such a large undertaking, was only willing to commit itself to the first stage of the project. The Government entered into a contract for the construction of the formation for a railway line from Wellington to Lower Hutt with John Brogden and Sons on 10 August 1872. Work commenced later that month on the 20th with a turning-of-the-first-sod ceremony officiated by the Governor General, Sir George Bowen. Progress was slow, and by July 1873 rails had only reached the south bank of the Kaiwarra [sic] Stream. The arrival of the first locomotive in November 1873 helped to speed up the pace of construction and the rails reached Lower Hutt in January 1874. John Brogden and Sons, initially tasked with creating the formation only, were also given the job of platelaying. The next few months were spent ballasting the line with this being completed on 4 April.

A special train ran two days prior to the official opening of the line to Lower Hutt and return carrying various political and civic dignitaries. The first revenue service departed Wellington on 14 April 1874, without ceremony, and arrived at Lower Hutt, also without any public reception.

Even before this first train ran, the Government was already seeking to let a contract for the construction of the next section, known as the Hutt Contract. This was awarded to Charles McKirdy and covered the section from Lower Hutt to 15 chains (990 ft; 300 m) past Haywards. The formation was completed in July 1874 and he was then also awarded the contract for platelaying the section, a task that was completed in November. Despite this, train services continued to terminate at Lower Hutt.

The contract for the next section to Upper Hutt, known as the River Contract, was let to Charles McKirdy while he was still working on the Hutt Contract. Once again he was also awarded the contract for platelaying the section and following the completion of the Hutt River Bridge in August 1875 the rails reached Silver Stream [sic] in December of that year. The contract was completed to Upper Hutt in January 1876 but severe flooding later that month necessitated repairs to the line, delaying the opening of the new section until 1 February.

Traffic on the line had grown to such an extent by 1900 that the single-track line with its sharp curves between Wellington and Petone was becoming a serious impediment. It was decided to double-track and straighten the line and accordingly the Hutt Railway and Road Improvement Act was passed in 1903 to authorise the work. New stations were established at Petone and Lower Hutt and track duplication between these two stations was completed on 27 July 1905. The remaining work proceeded south from Petone towards Wellington but various difficulties encountered by the contractor meant that the entire double-tracked line between Lower Hutt and Lambton was not opened until 4 April 1911.

The section from the Hutt Valley Junction to Lower Hutt was reduced to a single line on 13 July 1958.

=== Operation ===
Following the opening of the first section of line to Lower Hutt, services ran to a timetable which scheduled three return trips per day, seven days a week. The journey was scheduled to take 30 minutes in each direction. At first there were no intermediate stops, Kaiwarra [sic] and Ngahauranga [sic] not being included until a week later. It was the following year before a stop at Korokoro was added.

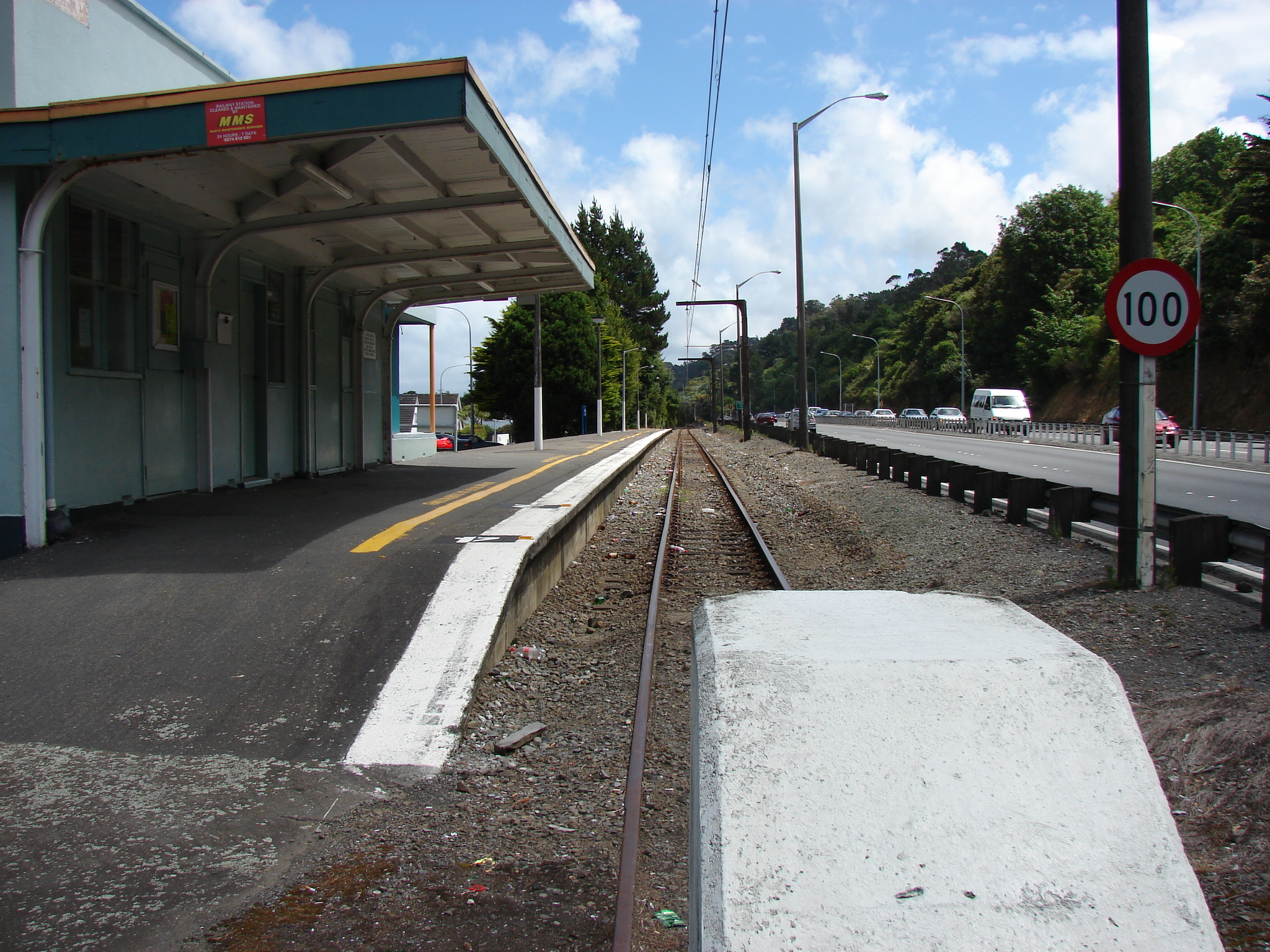
The Melling branch terminates at Melling railway station.

Following the completion of platelaying to Silver Stream [sic] in December 1875 some trains started running north of Lower Hutt to that station. It was not, however, until the opening of the line to Upper Hutt that services were increased beyond the original timetable.

Electric services were already running on the old route of the Wairarapa Line prior to its deviation and operation as a separate branch line when, on 23 November 1953, the first electric trains started running to Lower Hutt. Completion of electrification to Melling was achieved on 1 March 1954 when Melling branch services commenced.

The Melling branch lost the last of its freight traffic in 1981 when the goods facilities at Lower Hutt closed and the local goods shunts to Lower Hutt ceased. Goods handling was transferred to a new facility at Gracefield.

For several decades following its opening as a branch line, the Melling branch enjoyed a full complement of peak and off-peak services, seven days a week. By 1980 Sunday services had ceased and a short-lived Melling to Petone EMU shuttle service was introduced to run on Saturdays. Following the cancellation of the shuttle service, trains ran only from Monday to Friday. In 1986 off-peak services were withdrawn leaving the line with only peak-time trains. For a time patronage of the line was so low that the line was in danger of being closed altogether but in 2004 off-peak weekday services were restored. The lack of weekend services has been highlighted as an issue when events are held at the Westpac Stadium. Local business owners raised concerns of access for patrons of Wellington's matches for the 2011 Rugby World Cup. Requests had been made for the provision of special weekend services for these rugby matches but the Regional Council declined, saying "The Melling line doesn't operate on weekends anyway and this will not change during the Rugby World Cup."

The line is served by Matangi EMUs (electric multiple units). The last DM/D English Electric EMU to Melling ran on 25 June 2012, and the last EM/ET Ganz Mavag EMU ran on 27 May 2016 (and was farewelled by a local pre-school group).

The speed limit for trains on the Melling Line is 50 km/h (31 mph), with a 40 km/h (25 mph) limit through the junction with the Hutt Valley Line and 25 km/h (16 mph) entering Melling station. The speed limits were lowered in mid-2014 following two incidents when trains overran Melling station and hit the stop block at the end of the line.

=== Deviation ===
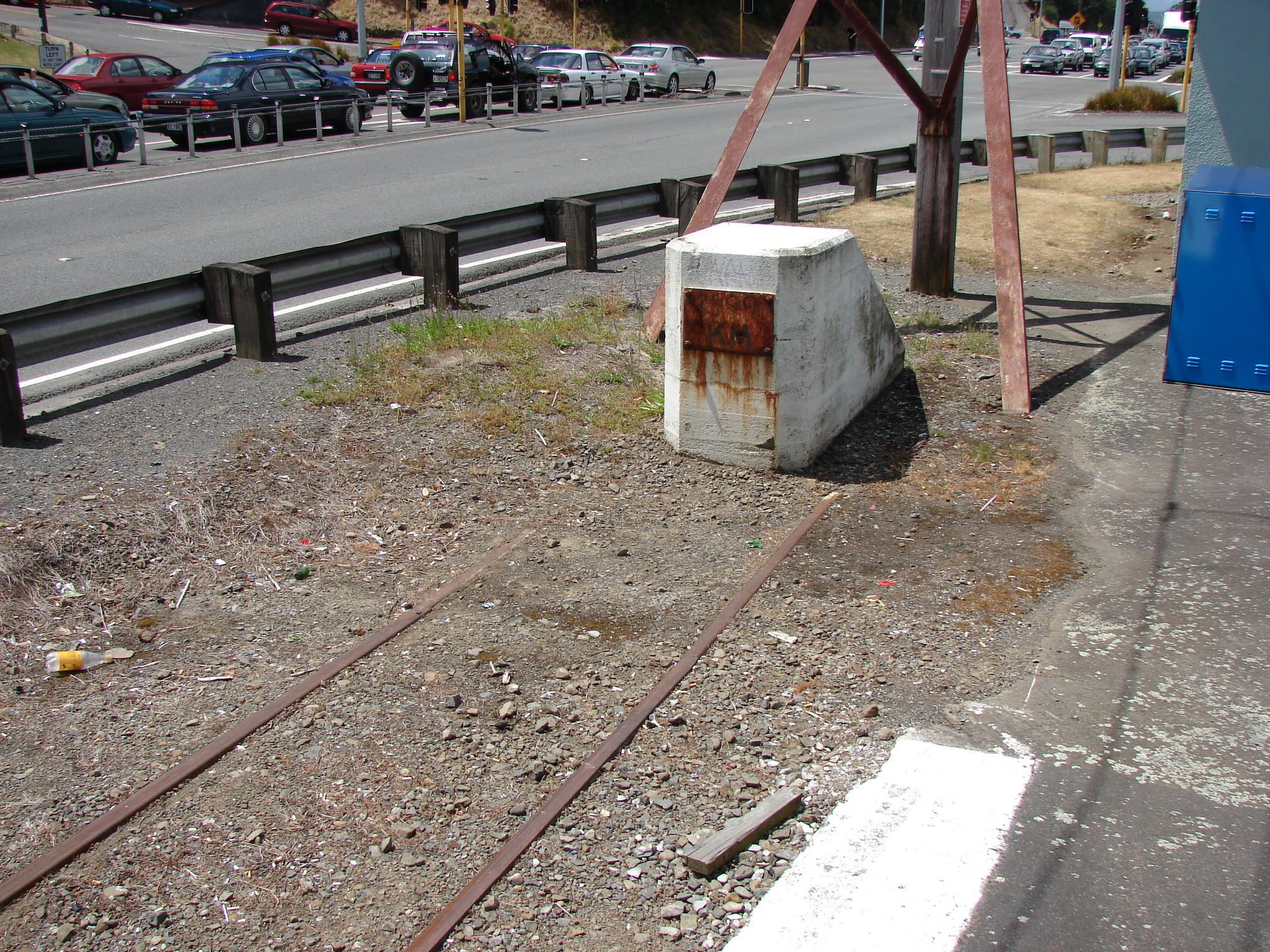
End of the line.

A severe shortage of coal following World War II led to the decision in February 1946 to electrify the remainder of Wellington’s suburban passenger rail network. Work had already commenced on the Hutt Valley branch to extend it north with the intention that it eventually become the main line. It had been hoped that the branch could join the existing Wairarapa Line at Silverstream, thereby avoiding additional crossings of the Hutt River, but this was not possible due to the unstable nature of the terrain in the area around Taita Gorge.

The Hutt Valley branch officially became part of the Wairarapa line on 1 March 1954. All Hutt Valley and Wairarapa train services commenced using the new route with the old route up the western side of the Hutt Valley having been closed to all traffic the previous day. It was also at this time that the Petone to Melling section commenced operation as the Melling branch terminating at a new station that had been built on the south side of the Melling Link Road, thereby avoiding the need for the line to cross any roads. The old track from Melling to Manor Park was later lifted and the original Melling station, on the north side of the road, was removed several years later. As the traffic requirements of the line were greatly diminished following its change in status to that of a branch line, the double tracking between Hutt Valley Junction and Lower Hutt was deemed surplus to requirements and singled by 13 July 1958. As the branch is single line throughout and therefore can only have one train on it at a time, all but one signal – the home signal protecting the junction with the main Hutt Valley Line – were gradually removed between 1958 and December 2013. When Petone was resignalled in December 2013, the home signal was upgraded and a new distant signal was erected at Melling station.

== Services ==
Melling Line trains currently operate both peak and off-peak schedules from Monday to Friday only. Services arrive at and depart from Melling half-hourly (peak), hourly (off-peak). Trains stop at the following stations:

- Wellington
- Kaiwharawhara (station closed 2013)
- Ngauranga
- Petone
- Western Hutt
- Melling

== Future ==
The Melling station will be moved under the three 2018 NZTA options for replacing the Melling road bridge.

It has been suggested that the Melling branch could be extended across the Hutt River to provide rail access to central Lower Hutt, and possibly extended to provide a cross-valley link to the Wairarapa Line at Waterloo Station. The Hutt Corridor Plan (December 2003) identified "Lack of direct passenger rail access to the Lower Hutt Central area" as an issue for the long-term vision for the corridor.

Another project with implications for the Melling branch is the SH2 Melling to Haywards upgrade, which proposes to establish interchanges at the Melling and Kennedy Good intersections to improve traffic flows. The Melling interchange will also improve access to Melling railway station. This project was in an investigation phase, but has now been postponed for at least ten years. In 2020, funding for the project was announced. In 2021, resource consents for the project were applied for. KiwiRail's submission included re-designation of the rail corridor to Melling, a new railway station 500 m south of the current station and a corridor under the new Melling interchange "to maintain the ability to extend the Melling Branch further north beyond the new Melling Branch station via a potential future grade-separated extension through the Melling interchange."
