= Transdev Wellington =

Public transport operator in Wellington

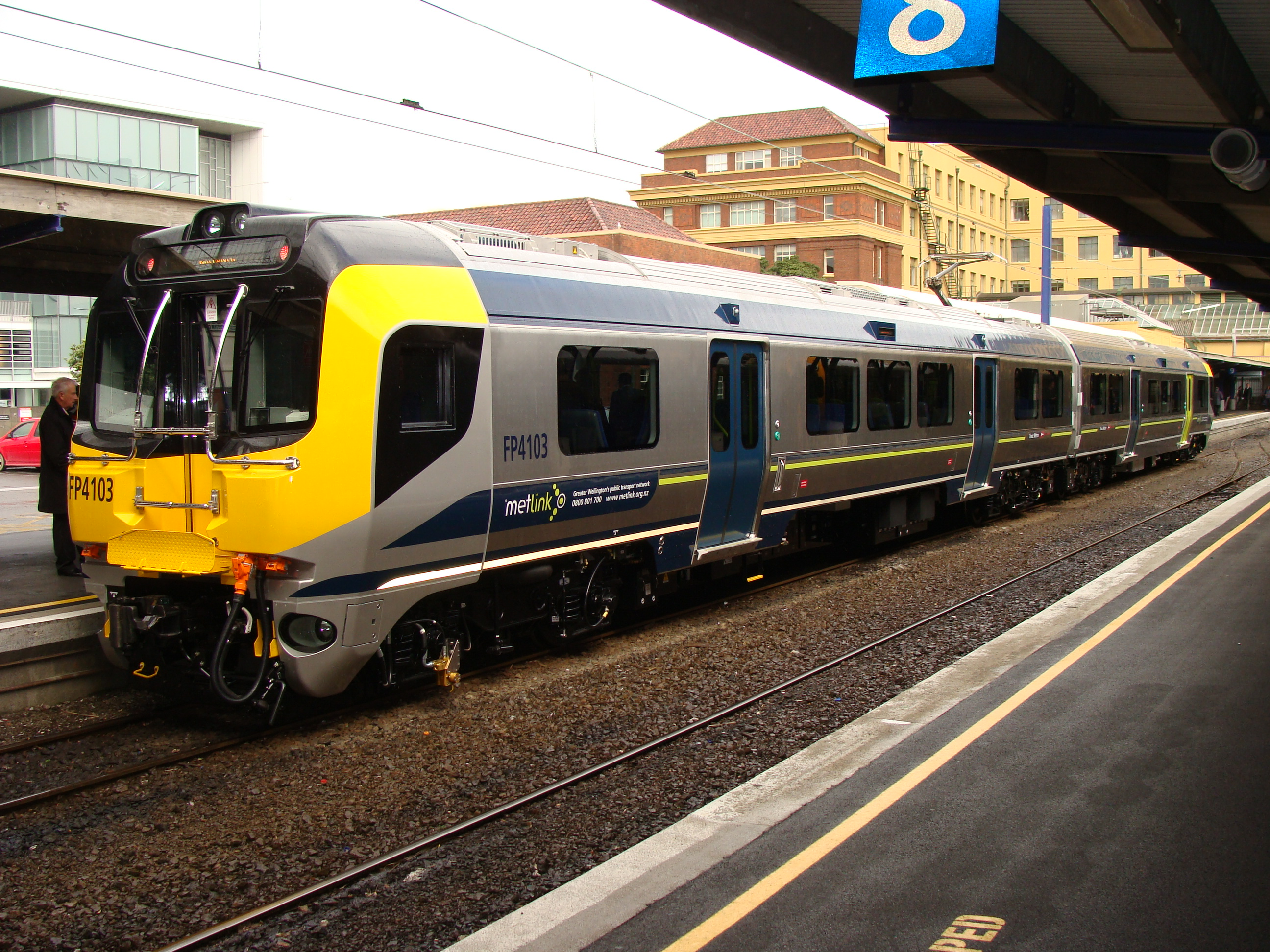
- A Matangi at Wellington railway station.

Overview
- Owner: Transdev Australasia; Hyundai Rotem
- Locale: Wellington Region, New Zealand
- Transit type: Suburban rail
- Number of lines: 5
- Number of stations: 49
- Headquarters: Wellington
- Website: www.transdevwellington.co.nz

Operation
- Began operation: 3 July 2016; 10 years ago

Technical
- System length: 160 km (99 mi)
- Track gauge: 1,067 mm (3 ft 6 in)
- Electrification: 1,500 V DC (101 km)
System map

Transdev Wellington is the operator of Wellington's Metlink rail network in New Zealand. The entity is a partnership of Transdev Australasia and Hyundai Rotem, who were awarded the contract to operate and maintain the commuter rail system in December 2015 by the Greater Wellington Regional Council. The contract commenced on 3 July 2016, taking over from KiwiRail division Tranz Metro.

== Background ==
The Greater Wellington Regional Council (GWRC) put the contract for the operation of Wellington's metropolitan commuter rail services out to tender in 2015. Bids were received from a Keolis Downer/KiwiRail joint venture, Serco and a Transdev Australasia/Hyundai Rotem joint venture. In December 2015, the Transdev Australasia/Hyundai Rotem joint venture was announced as the preferred bidder.

The contract runs for nine years from 1 July 2016. The contract has two three-year extension options, taking its potential total length to 15 years. Extensions are subject to the achievement of performance targets including on-time performance and customer satisfaction. GWRC stated that the contract is to provide savings to ratepayers of around $100m over the 15 years.

In November 2017, the first strike on Wellington's network in 24 years occurred.

== Operations ==
Most of Tranz Metro's 400 operational staff were re-employed by Transdev Wellington.

=== Rolling stock ===
Most rolling stock used on the Wellington suburban network is owned by the GWRC and leased to the current operator. The fleet comprises:

- 83 FP/FT "Matangi" class electric multiple units (Johnsonville, Hutt Valley, Kapiti and Melling lines)
- 18 SW class carriages (Wairarapa Connection)
- 6 SE class carriages (Wairarapa Connection)
- 1 AG class baggage/generator van (Wairarapa Connection)

The Capital Connection and Wairarapa Connection are to be replaced by the New Zealand BEMU class electric multiple unit in 2030. They are to be operated by Alstom.

Transdev contracts KiwiRail on a "hook-and-tow" basis for the DFB class diesel-electric locomotives that haul the Wairarapa Connection services.

== Lines ==
There are five lines operated by Transdev:

- Kapiti Line
- Hutt Valley Line
- Johnsonville Line
- Melling Branch
- Wairarapa Connection

== See also ==
- Public transport in the Wellington Region
