= Andrews railway station =

Defunct railway station in New Zealand

Coordinates: 41°10′59.05″S 174°56′29.13″E

Andrews
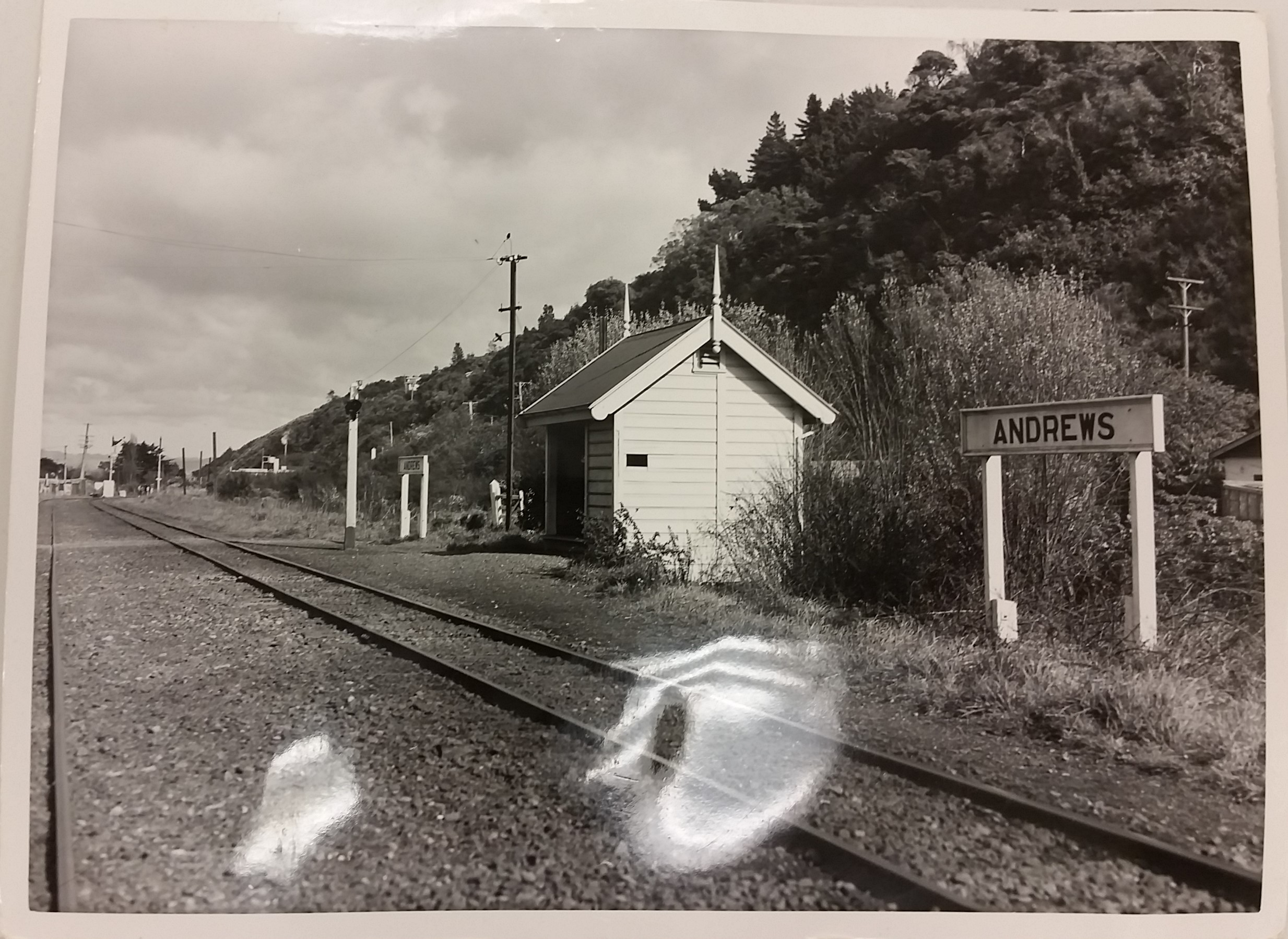

General information
- Location: Western Hutt Road, Lower Hutt
- System: New Zealand Government Railways (NZGR)
- Owner: Railways Department
- Line: Hutt Valley Line
- Platforms: Side
- Tracks: Main line (1)

History
- Opened: 1938
- Closed: 28 February 1954
Location

Andrews Railway Station was a station on the Hutt Valley Line section of the Wairarapa Line in New Zealand. The line ran up the western side of the valley until 28 February 1954 when the Melling-Belmont section of the line closed.

Andrews was north of Melling and the Belmont stations, but south of Gosse & Co’s siding, on the closed section of line.

== History ==
Andrews was opened in 1938 to replace Pitcaithly's railway station. The building at Pitcaithly’s was moved south to Andrews to better serve the population in the rural area on the western side of the valley.

In 1938, the Minister of Railways, Dan Sullivan, said that moving the station from Pitcaithlys (sic) to Andrews had been decided two years ago, as the settlement in the vicinity of the new station was several times greater than the population adjacent to Pitcaithlys. It did not relate to general improvements to Hutt Valley rail facilities, which had not yet been considered by Cabinet.

Andrews (unlike Pitcaithly’s) was always spelt without an apostrophe.
