= Silverstream Bridge railway station =

Defunct railway station in New Zealand

Coordinates: 41°9′1.51″S 174°59′37.32″E

Silverstream Bridge

General information
- Location: Reynolds Bach Drive off Eastern Hutt Road, Upper Hutt
- System: New Zealand Government Railways (NZGR)
- Owner: Railways Department
- Line: Hutt Valley Line
- Platforms: Side
- Tracks: Main line (1)

History
- Opened: 26 May 1908
- Closed: 28 February 1954
Location

Silverstream Bridge railway station was a station on the Hutt Valley Line section of the Wairarapa Line in New Zealand from 1908 until 28 February 1954, when the Melling-Belmont section of the line and the first rail bridge at Silverstream was closed. It was replaced by the Silverstream railway station.

The station was just across the old rail bridge, in the corner of the Silverstream Hospital grounds. The building was built on a slight curve. It was unusual, being extra long and open on three sides. The back wall had three double doors from the platform.

== History ==
The Silverstream Bridge railway station was opened on 26 May 1908, and was one of several stations opened in 1908 on the Hutt Valley section of the line, along with Melling railway station, Gosse and Co's Siding, Pitcaithly's railway station, and the Belmont Quarry Co's Siding (which is not to be confused with the Belmont railway station). The main line ran up the western side of the Hutt Valley until 1954.

The station was closed in 1917, but was reopened on 17 August 1942 in World War II to serve the Silverstream Hospital built for American casualties from the Pacific.

Some of this section of the line is now preserved by the Silver Stream Railway, opened in 1978.
