= Ngauranga railway station =

Railway station in New Zealand

Ngauranga
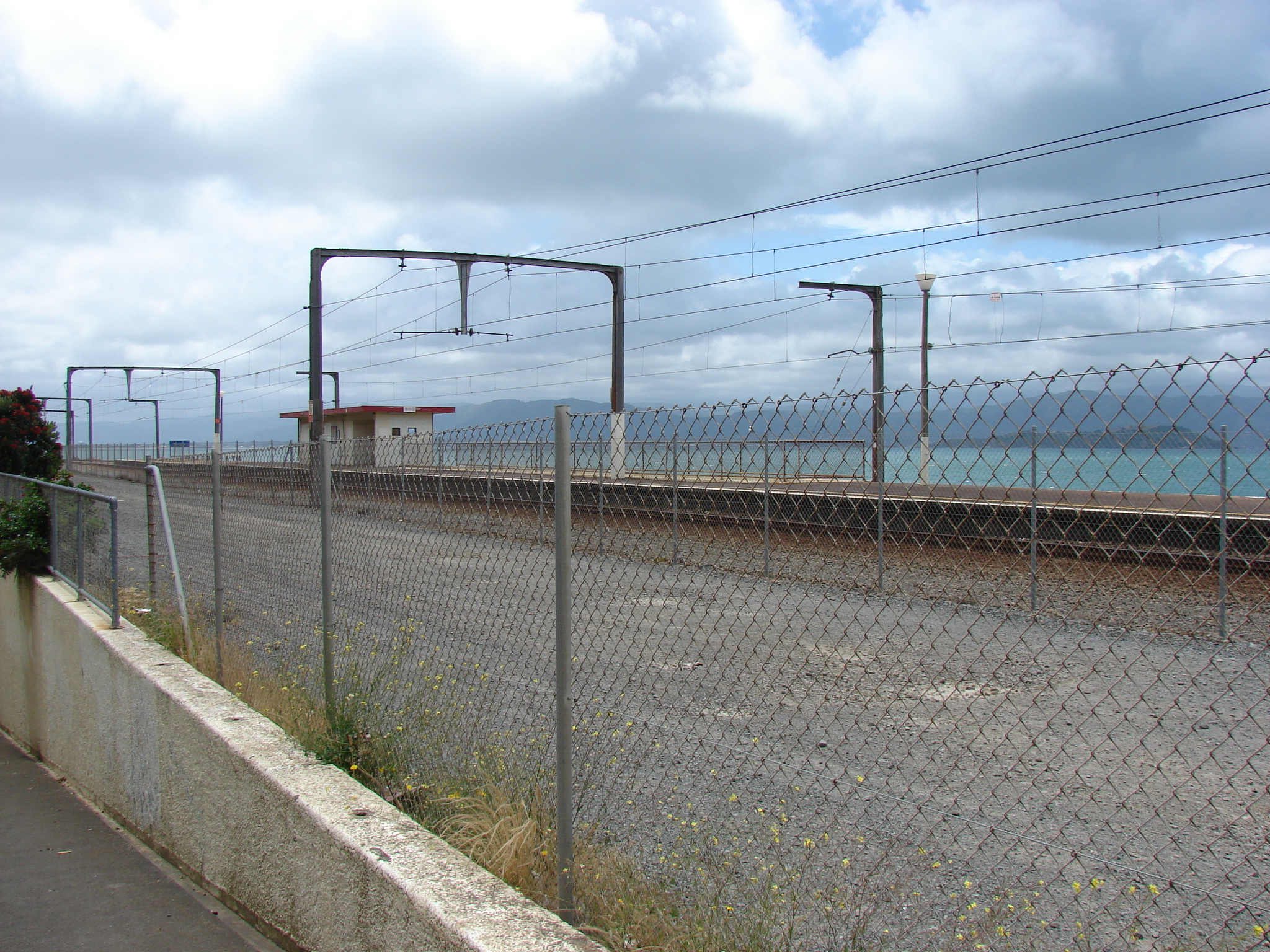

General information
- Location: Hutt Road, Ngauranga, Wellington, New Zealand
- Coordinates: 41°14′55.20″S 174°48′48.88″E
- System: Metlink regional rail
- Owner: Greater Wellington Regional Council
- Lines: Melling Line; Hutt Valley Line
- Platforms: Single island
- Tracks: Main line (2)

Construction
- Parking: No
- Cycle facilities: No

Other information
- Fare zone: 3

History
- Opened: 20 April 1874; 152 years ago
- Rebuilt: 1966; 60 years ago
- Electrified: 14 September 1953; 73 years ago
- Former names: Ngahauranga

Services
Preceding station	Transdev Wellington	Following station
Petone towards Melling	Melling Line	Wellington Terminus
Petone towards Upper Hutt	Hutt Valley Line	Wellington Terminus
Location

Ngauranga railway station is a single island platform railway station in the mainly industrial and commercial suburb of Ngauranga on the Wairarapa Line in Wellington, New Zealand. It is on the Wellington suburban rail network and is served by Melling Line trains and some only Hutt Valley Line trains. Wairarapa Connection trains pass this station but do not stop. All trains are run by Transdev as part of the Metlink network.

Ngauranga formerly handled freight traffic, but is now used exclusively by commuter passenger trains. It is next to a waste disposal facility and at the bottom of the Ngauranga Gorge, next to the major road junction where State Highway 2 joins State Highway 1.

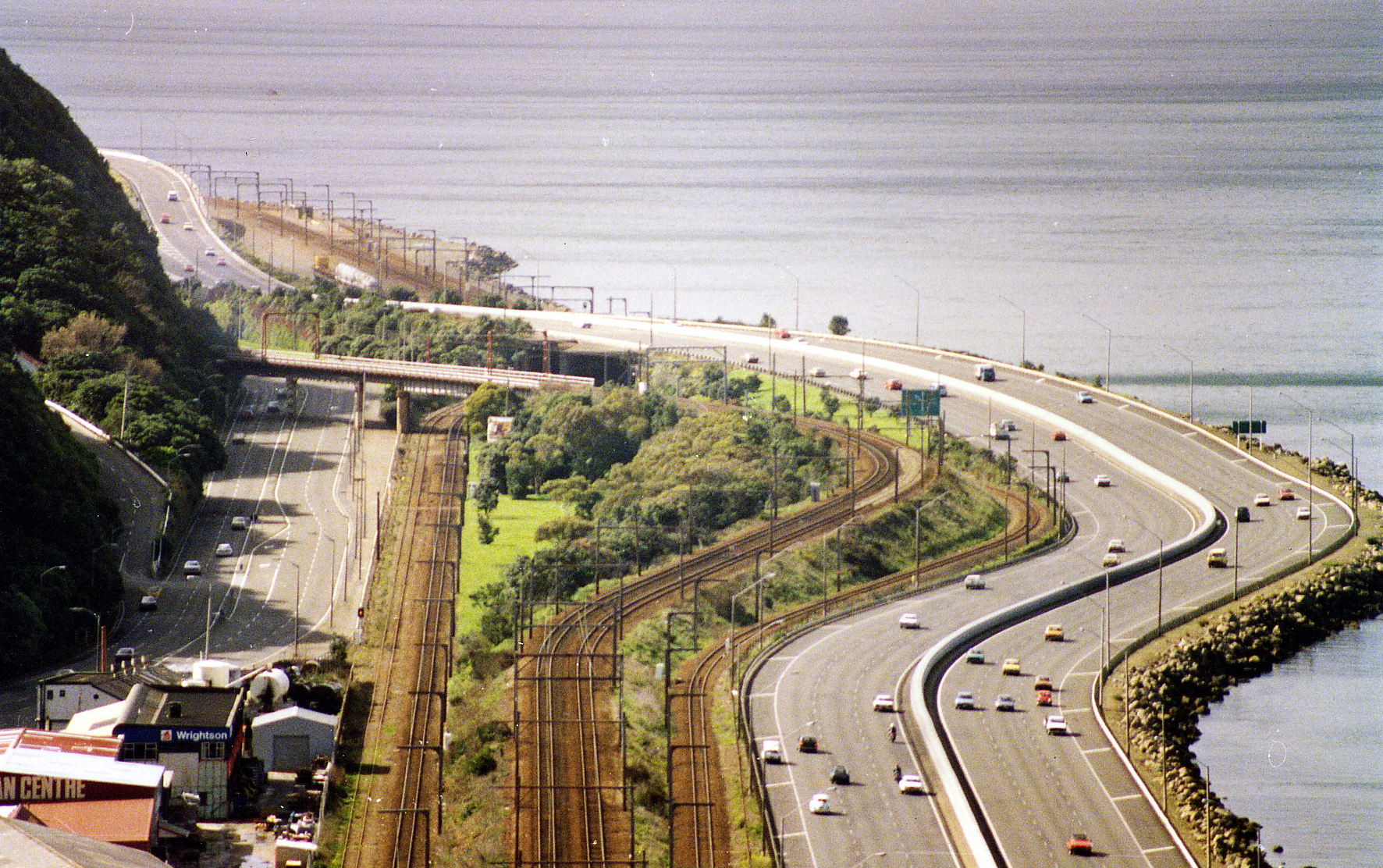
The North Island Main Trunk line crossing the Hutt Road to enter the first tunnel of the Tawa Flat deviation. Ngauranga station is in the background, alongside State Highway 1.

== History ==
Though the rails of the Wairarapa Line reached Ngahauranga at New Year 1874, the first section of the line was not opened until 14 April 1874. Trains initially ran non-stop to the terminus of the line from Wellington, and it would not be until a week after opening, on 20 April, that Ngahauranga was included as a stop.

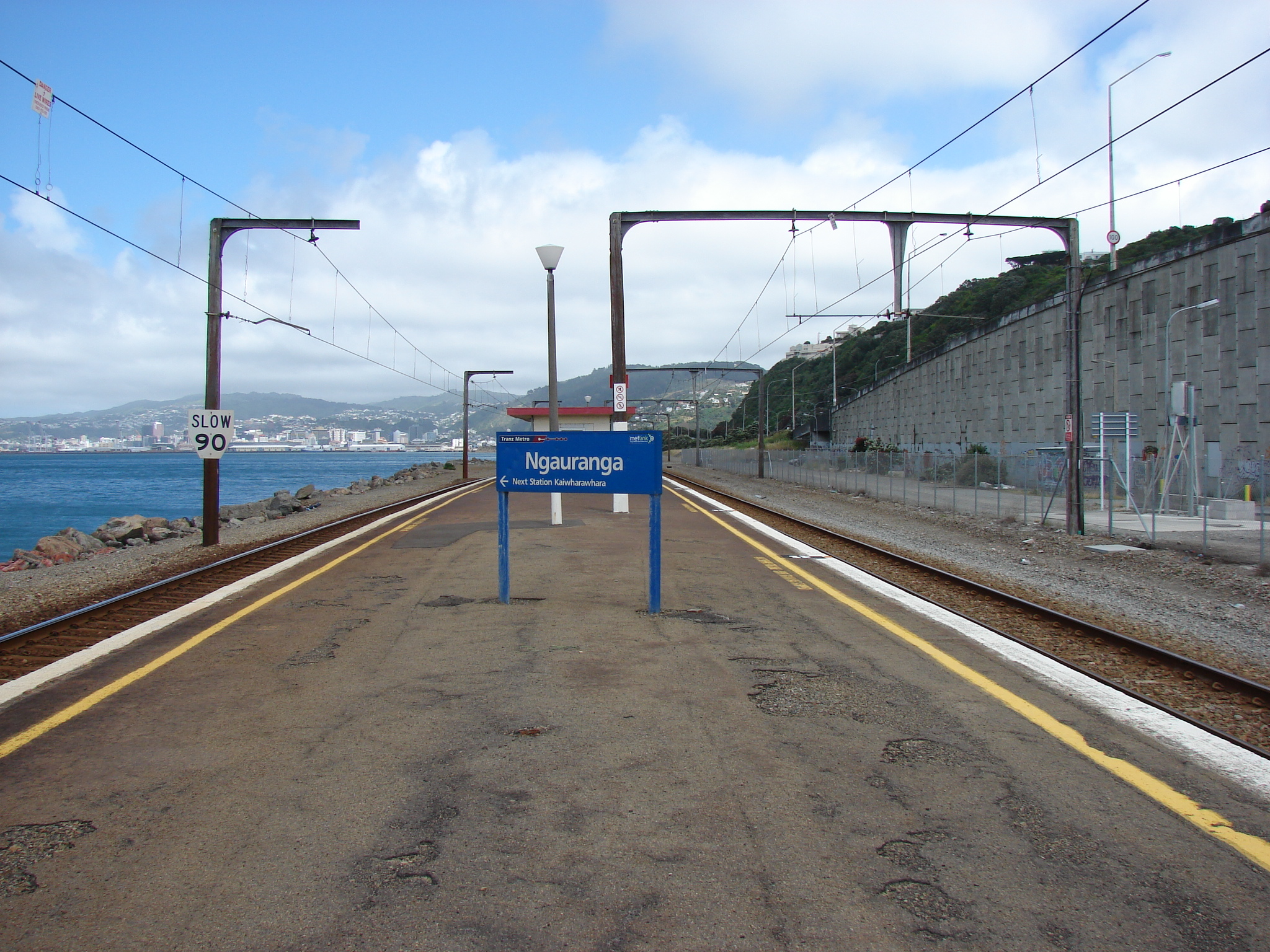
Ngauranga station, looking south. To the left is the Down line, to the right the Up line. Behind the fence are the waste disposal facility and the abutment for the southbound bridge of the Ngauranga Flyover.

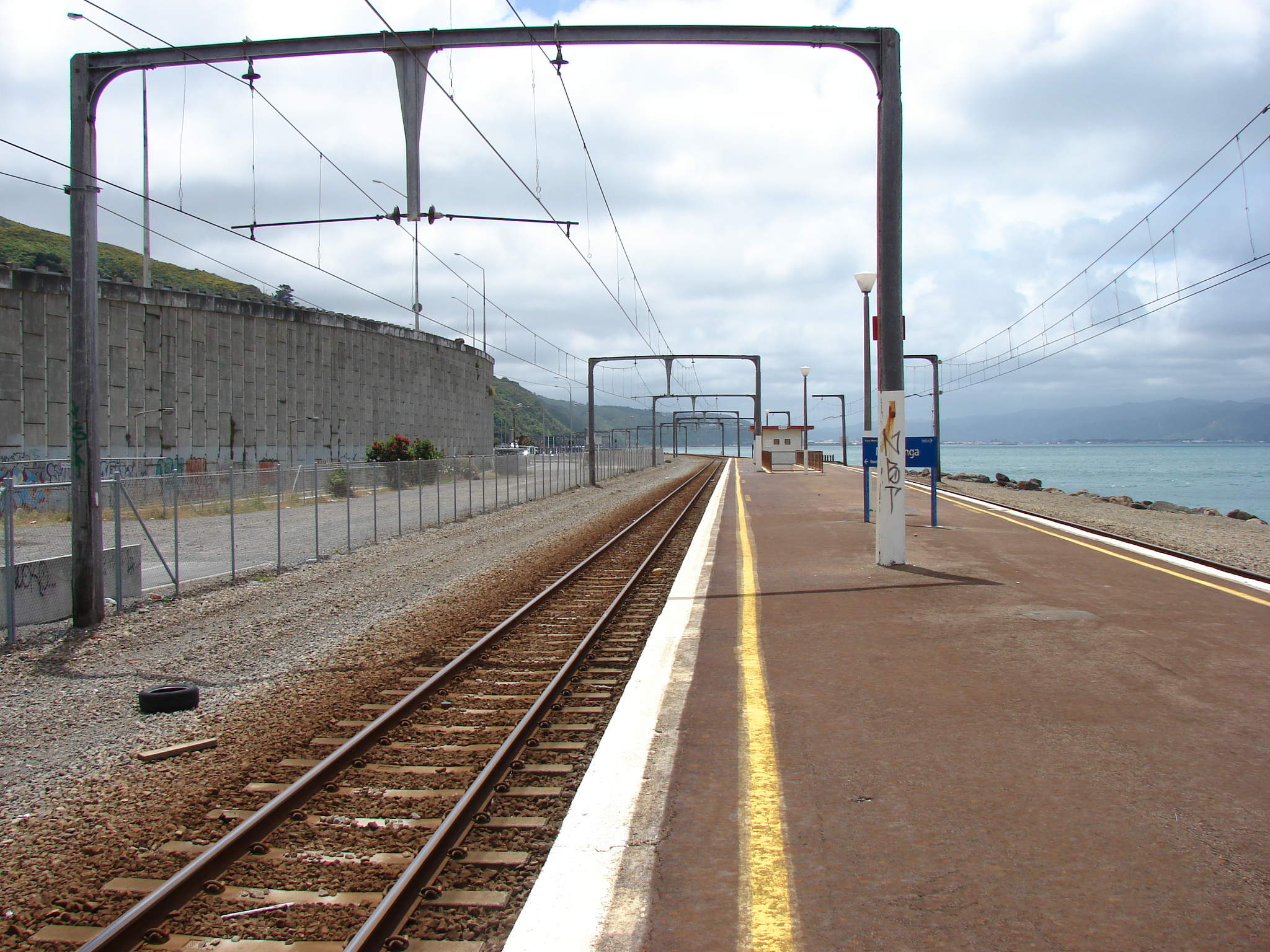
Ngauranga station, looking north. Notice the extra overhead wiring for a track between the Up line and the fence that has been removed.

Ngahauranga received its first building in late 1875. About 1879, the station received a class 6 passenger shelter costing £160. At the time, it had neither crossing loops nor sidings.

Livestock did not become a major source of traffic until the line reached Featherston in 1878, and was bolstered by the opening of the Wellington Meat Preserving and Refrigerating Company at Ngahauranga in 1884. To serve the abattoir, a siding was laid from the station yard across Hutt Road to the company's works in June of that year. About 1890 the first station was replaced by an island platform and pens for unloading stock for the meatworks.

The company had quickly become a significant customer for the railway, and in 1895 150,486 head of stock were railed to Ngahauranga. By about 1900, the station had stockyards and two sidings.

In the days of single-line working, Ngahauranga was used to cross trains and in 1887 became one of the first stations in the region to receive new signalling equipment. Instructions issued for the crossing of trains specified that Down trains were to take the loop while Up trains were to use the main line.

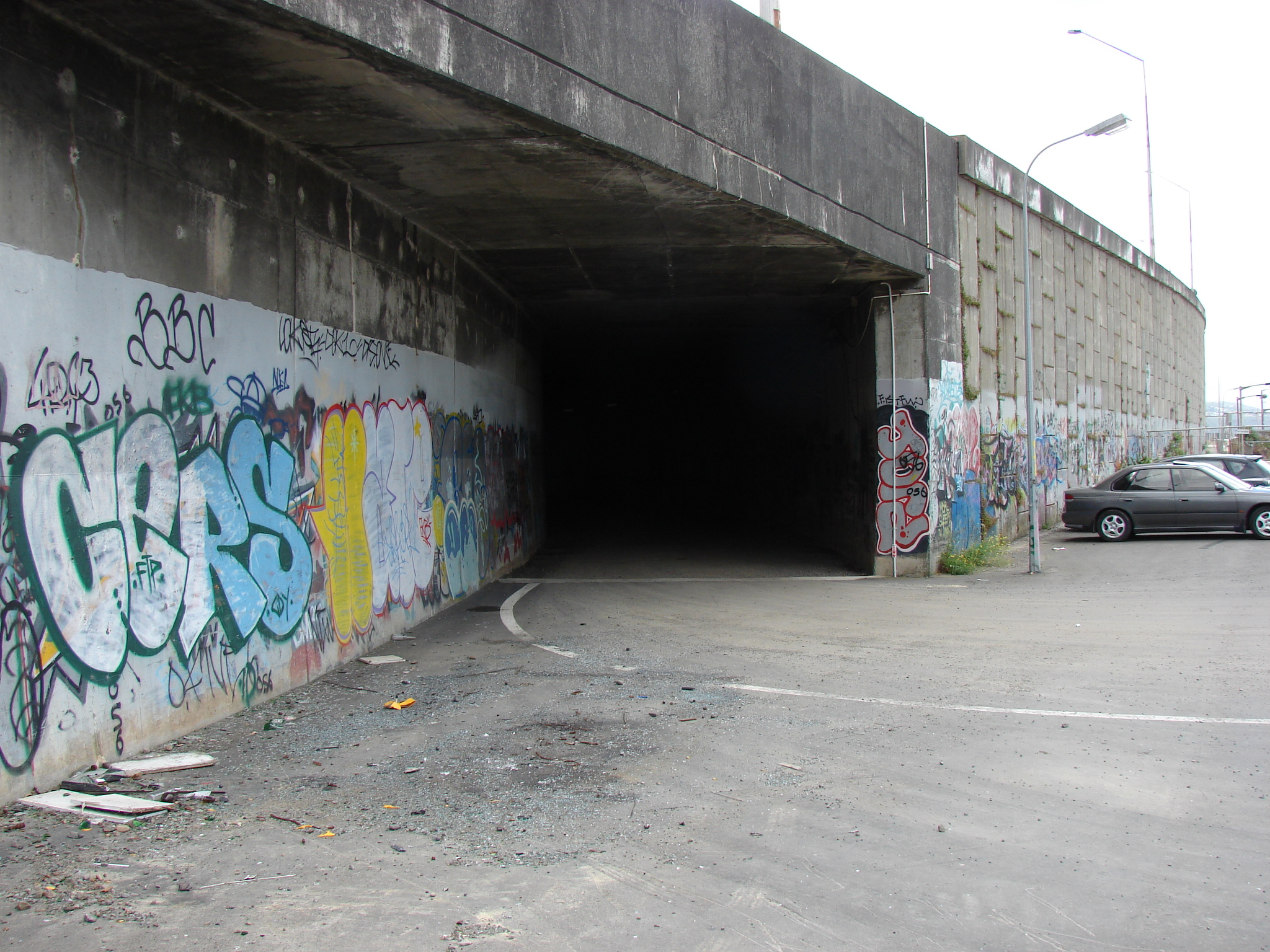
Entrance to the tunnel formerly used by the Ngauranga Industrial Siding (Wellington Meat Export Company) from the Ngauranga railway station yard, now the access road to the waste disposal facility.

Early in the 20th century it was decided to duplicate the line between Wellington and Lower Hutt. Preparatory work was started in 1903 with construction commencing the following year. The duplication reached Ngahauranga in 1908, but was not completed until three years later when it opened to all traffic on 4 April 1911.

The Wellington Meat Export Company, formed in 1881, operated an abattoir in the Ngauranga Gorge, and utilised the Ngauranga Industrial Siding to transport livestock in and carcasses out from the network of sidings in its own yard. The siding ran through a small tunnel under the motorway and crossed the Hutt Road to the works. The company operated the siding with a 20-ton Barclay 0-4-0ST until 1962, at which point it was replaced by a four-wheel diesel shunter. The siding was closed and removed in the 1980s, and the tunnel under the motorway is now used for vehicular access to the waste disposal facility.

In 1966, the construction of the new motorway into Wellington necessitated the realignment of the railway through Ngauranga. A new station was constructed on reclaimed land including the present-day station building, which replaced the much grander wooden structure of the old station. The motorway was built over the siding to the abattoir by constructing a tunnel for the siding.

In 1968, there was a reasonably extensive network of sidings at Ngauranga, including three lines on the western side of the station running parallel to the two main lines. The industrial siding to the abattoir connected with the station sidings at the southern end of the yard. The construction of the Ngauranga Flyover and motorway interchange in 1982 was the last major construction work in the vicinity of the station. Only the two main lines on either side of the island platform remain.

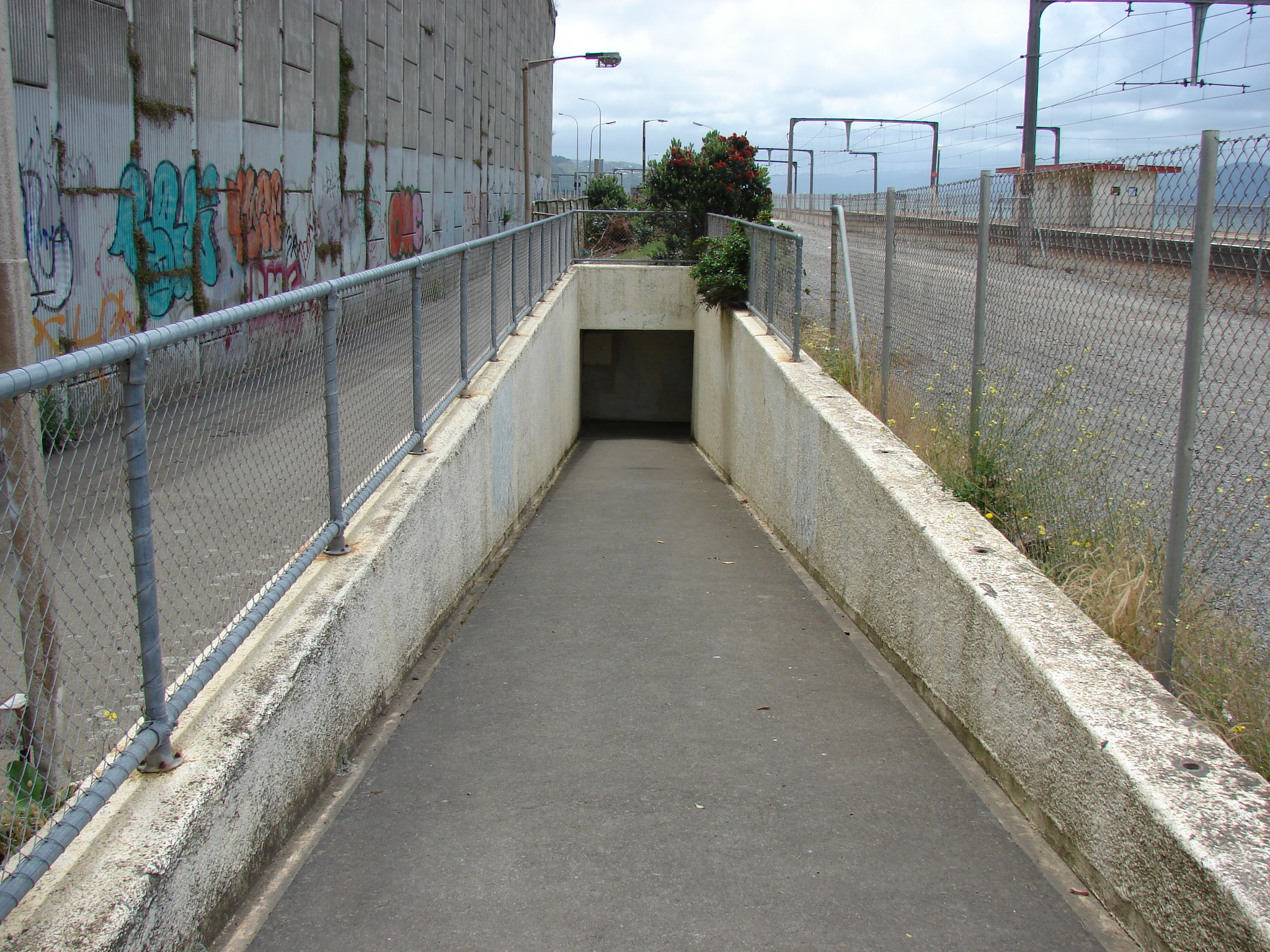
Walkway from Hutt Road and subway entrance to Ngauranga railway station.

== Services ==
Melling Line trains stop here every hour Monday to Friday, with daily half-hourly Hutt Valley Line trains supplementing at peak times. It is possible to transfer to buses to/from Johnsonville, Newlands or Churton Park at Ngauranga, to commute to the Hutt Valley without going into Wellington.

=== Bus ===
Metlink bus routes 1, 19e, 52, 56, 57, 58, 83 and 60e pass close to the station.

== Facilities ==
A station building on the platform provides shelter for waiting passengers. Access to the station is by a subway under the Wellington Urban Motorway that connects via a short walkway to Hutt Road. No car parking is provided.
