= Pitcaithly's railway station =

Defunct railway station in New Zealand

Pitcaithly’s

General information
- Location: Western Hutt Road, Lower Hutt
- Coordinates: 41.1809°S 174.9444°E
- System: New Zealand Government Railways (NZGR)
- Owner: Railways Department
- Line: Hutt Valley Line
- Platforms: Side
- Tracks: Main line (1)

History
- Opened: 1908
- Closed: 1938
Location

Pitcaithly’s railway station and siding was a station on the Hutt Valley Line section of the Wairarapa Line in New Zealand north of Melling, which ran up the western side of the valley until 1954. It was replaced by Andrews railway station in 1938.

== History ==
Pitcaithly’s was one of several stations opened in 1908 on the Hutt Valley section of the line, along with Melling, Gosse and Co’s siding, the Belmont Quarry Co’s Siding (which is not to be confused with the Belmont railway station), and the Silverstream Bridge railway station.

Pitcaithly’s was closed in 1938 and the building moved to the Andrews railway station south of Gosse and Co’s siding. The distance moved south was about 1.2 km on the sketch map, but 3.65 km (2.27 mi) based on the difference in distance from Wellington (11.13 and 13.40 miles). However Hoy does note that 13.40 miles, the distance of Pitcaithly’s from Wellington, is an approximate mileage only.

Hoy has a photo of the station building at Pitcaithly’s, which is a small Flag Station shelter building with a two-part pitched roof highest at the middle. The name on the building is Pitcaithlys without an apostrophe. Note that in the index, sketch map and Appendix A, Hoy spells the name Pitchaithlys, which appears to be a mistake.

In 1938 the Minister of Railways Dan Sullivan said that moving the station from Pitcaithlys (sic) to Andrews had been decided two years ago, as the settlement in the vicinity of the new station was several times greater than the population adjacent to Pitcaithlys. It did not relate to general improvements to Hutt Valley rail facilities, which had not yet been considered by Cabinet.
