= Wairarapa Line =

Secondary railway line in New Zealand

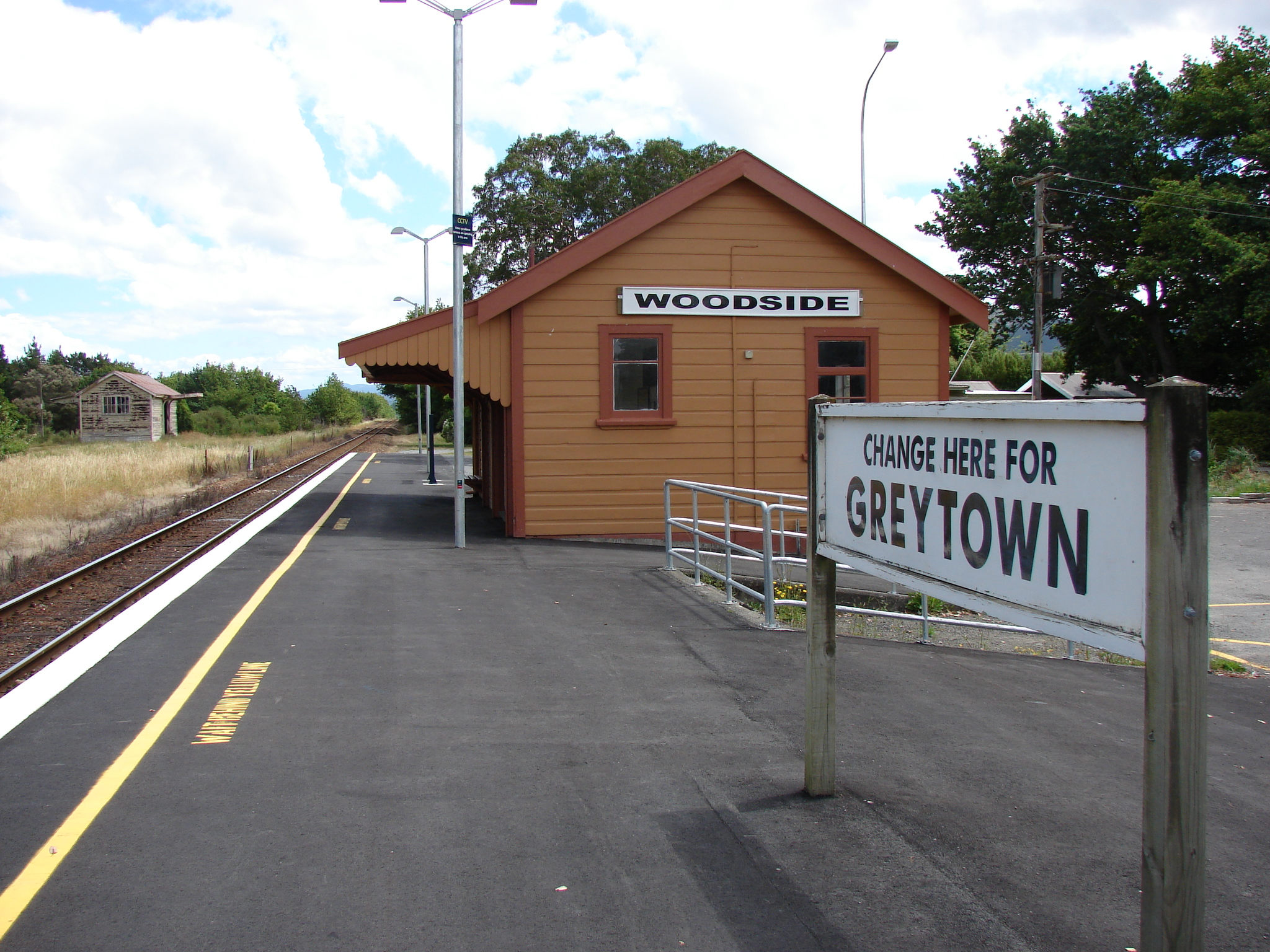
- Woodside railway station

Overview
- Status: Open for passengers and freight
- Owner: KiwiRail (infrastructure); New Zealand Railways Corporation (land)
- Locale: Wellington Region; Manawatū-Whanganui
- Termini: Wellington; Woodville
- Stations: 27 current

Service
- Type: Secondary line
- Route number: WRL
- Operator(s): Transdev Wellington, KiwiRail
- Rolling stock: DFT class locomotives FP/FT class "Matangi" EMU; SW/SE class carriage
- Daily ridership: 679,455 trips annually (2009)

History
- Opened: 14 April 1874 (to Lower Hutt); 15 December 1875 (to Silverstream Bridge); 1 February 1876 (to Upper Hutt); 1 January 1878 (to Kaitoke); 12 October 1878 (to Summit); 16 October 1878 (to Featherston); 14 May 1880 (to Woodside Junction); 1 November 1880 (to Masterton); 14 June 1886 (to Mauriceville); 10 January 1887 (to Mangamahoe); 8 April 1889 (to Eketāhuna); 18 March 1896 (to Newman); 3 May 1897 (to Pahiatua); 11 December 1897 (to Woodville Junction)
- Closed: 28 February 1954 (Melling to Manor Park deviated); 21 November 1954 (Haywards to Silverstream deviated); 30 October 1955 (Upper Hutt to Featherston deviated)

Technical
- Line length: Currently 171.5 kilometres (106.6 mi); Originally 186 kilometres (116 mi)
- Num of tracks: Double (Wellington–Upper Hutt); Single (Upper Hutt–Woodville)
- Character: Urban, provincial, rural
- Track gauge: 3 ft 6 in (1,067 mm)
- Electrification: 1500 V DC Overhead; 14 September 1953 (Wellington to Taitā); 23 November 1953 (Petone to Lower Hutt); 24 July 1955 (Taitā to Upper Hutt)
- Operating speed: 90 km/h (56 mph)

Map

The Wairarapa Line is a secondary railway line in the south-east of the North Island of New Zealand. The line runs for 172 kilometres (107 mi), connecting the capital city Wellington with the Palmerston North–Gisborne Line at Woodville, via Lower Hutt, Upper Hutt and Masterton.

The first part of the line opened in 1874 between Wellington and Lower Hutt, with the entire line to Woodville completed in 1897. It was the only New Zealand Government Railways route out of Wellington until 1908, when the government bought out the Wellington and Manawatu Railway Company who owned and operated the present North Island Main Trunk section between Wellington and Palmerston North. The line originally included the famous Rimutaka Incline, which used the Fell mountain railway system to cross the Rimutaka Range between Upper Hutt and Featherston. In the mid-1950s, the line between Petone and Featherston was substantially realigned, with the line diverted to the east of the Hutt River between Petone and Haywards to serve new housing developments in Lower Hutt, and the construction of the Rimutaka Tunnel to replace the Rimutaka Incline. Part of the former route west of the Hutt River has been retained as the Melling Branch.

The southern portion of the line between Wellington and Upper Hutt is electrified and is also known as the Hutt Valley Line. Transdev on behalf of the Greater Wellington Regional Council runs suburban services along the Hutt Valley section, as well as the Wairarapa Connection service between Wellington and Masterton. KiwiRail runs regular freight services along the line between Wellington to Masterton and between Pahiatua and Woodville. No regular services currently run over the Masterton to Pahiatua section see under Freight Service. The section may be reviewed as part of KiwiRail's turnaround plan.

The Labour Party promised during the 2017 election campaign to upgrade the track to improve operation of the Wairarapa Connection, and on 9 October 2018 the Minister of Transport Phil Twyford announced that the proposed $196 million for the region included $96 million for the Wairarapa Line; $50 million in the Wairarapa and $46.2 million south of the Rimutaka Tunnel including double-tracking the Trentham to Upper Hutt section. Work is to start in April 2019. The double-tracking was completed in November 2021. Other "infrastructure renewals" on the line include three bridges with timber elements and track renewal (including in the Rimutaka Tunnel), replacement of signals between Masterton and Featherston and upgrades to Upper Hutt. Passing loops at Carterton and Woodside had previously been removed, leaving Featherston with the only loop between Upper Hutt and Masterton; the Carterton loop may need reinstating at some time for more frequent trains. The New Zealand Upgrade Programme announced on 30 January 2020 included passing loops at Carterton, Featherston and Maymorn and a second platform at Featherston. It is planned to have up to 7 peak services from Masterton at 15-minute intervals.

== Construction ==
Proposals for railed transportation out of Wellington were made as early as the start of the 1850s, barely a decade after European settlement of the area began. In 1853 and 1857, investigation of horse-hauled tramways was undertaken, but no action was taken. Robert Stokes, a member of the provincial government, proposed a railway over the Rimutakas in 1858 and finally succeeded in gaining government interest in 1863. The Wellington Provincial Government established a committee to investigate proposals, and on 2 July 1866, it passed the Wellington, Hutt and Wairarapa Railway Ordinance. The act authorised a railway employing either 3 ft 6 in (1,067 mm) or 1,435 mm (4 ft 8 1/2 in) standard gauge to carry 200 tonnes at speeds of 24 kilometres per hour (15 mph), but construction did not commence as sufficient funds were not available in the fledgling New Zealand colony, nor were they successfully raised in England.

In 1870, Julius Vogel included a Wellington-Wairarapa railway in his Great Public Works Policy and visited London to arrange a loan to finance the policy. On this trip, he was approached by several contracting firms and a contract that included the first section of the Wairarapa Line was awarded to Brogden & Sons. The construction of the line can be considered in three stages: the Hutt Valley section, the route over the Rimutakas, and the line through the Wairarapa via Masterton to Woodville.

=== Hutt Valley section ===
On 20 August 1872, construction of the Wairarapa Line began with the turning of the first sod at Pipitea Point, the site of Wellington's first railway station. Construction was delayed due to the difficulties associated with building a railway along the narrow, rocky shoreline of Wellington Harbour, and the section to Lower Hutt was not opened until 14 April 1874. Further difficulties were encountered in building the rest of the route up the Hutt Valley along the Hutt River's western bank, including the need to divert the river and reinforce its bank in places. On 1 February 1876 the line opened to Upper Hutt. On 28 December 1877 the line to Kaitoke was officially opened by the Governor. On 1 January 1878 the line to Kaitoke was opened to the public; becoming the railhead for the Wairarapa for nearly ten months (to 16 October).

=== Rimutaka section ===
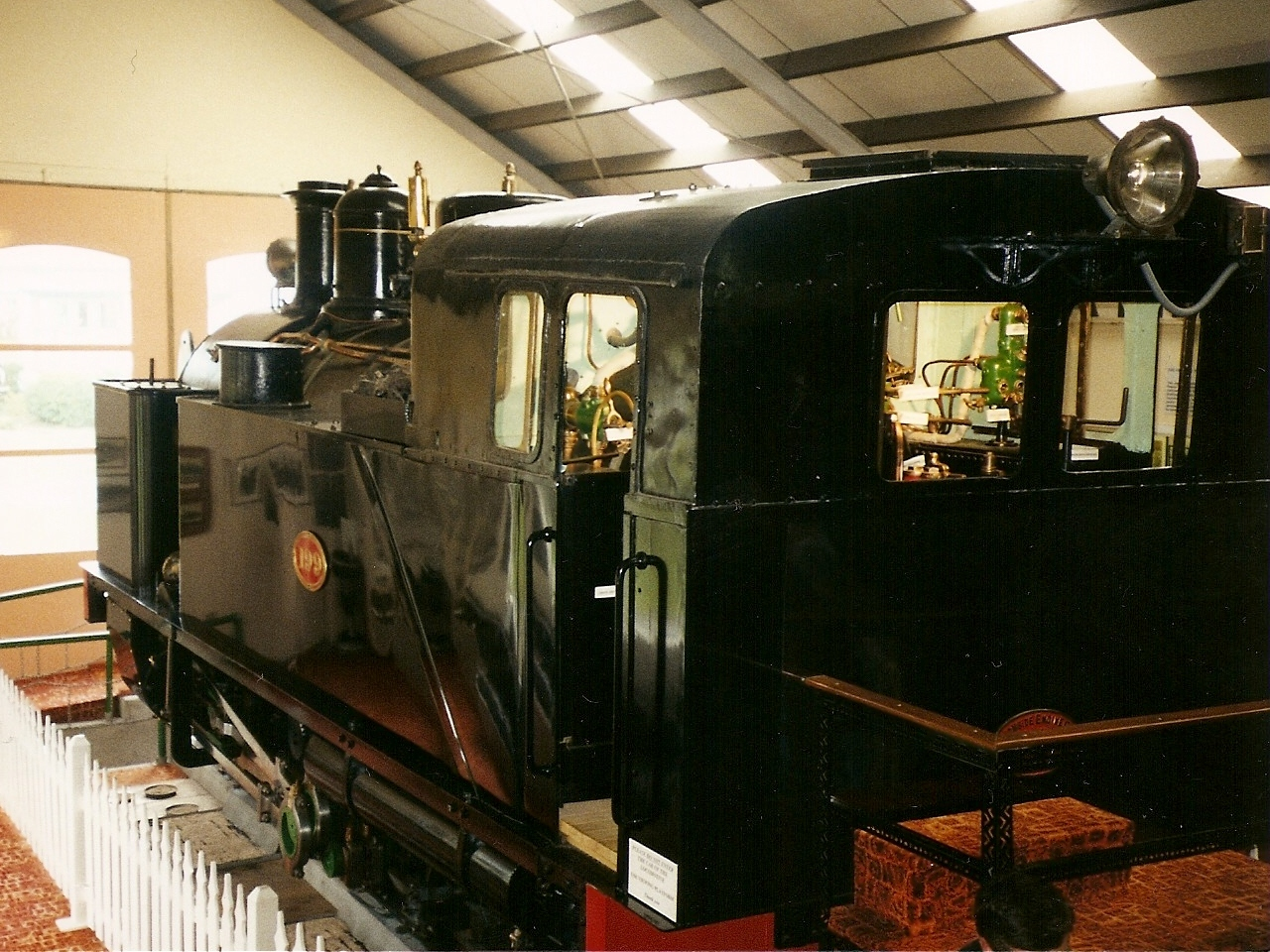
One of the special locomotives employed on the Rimutaka Incline, H 199, now preserved at the Fell Engine Museum.

The Rimutaka Range posed a severe difficulty to those involved in planning and constructing the Wairarapa Line. On 1 January 1878, the Hutt line opened to Kaitoke at the western foot of the range, and a steep but manageable route with a grade of 1 in 39-40 was found from Kaitoke up the Pakuratahi River valley to the site of Summit station, 348 metres (1,142 ft) above sea level. However, from Summit down the eastern slope to Cross Creek near Featherston, a gradient of 1 in 14-16 was required. This was far too steep for regular steam locomotives to handle, and accordingly the Fell mountain railway system was employed. This used a centre rail to which specially designed locomotives and brake vans clung, allowing them to climb the steep slope upwards or control the descent. Despite the terrain, construction of this unique route was completed swiftly, opening to Featherston on 12 October 1878.

=== South Wairarapa section ===
Construction from Featherston to Masterton across the Wairarapa plains north of Lake Wairarapa was relatively easy. The decision was taken to bypass Greytown and build the line through Woodside to bridge the Waiohine River at a point far enough up the river to be considered safe; a line through Greytown would have required a bridge at a point considered unsafe by the surveyors. The Greytown Branch was constructed from Woodside, and Greytown was briefly the effective terminus of the Wairarapa Line from the opening of the branch on 14 May 1880 until the bridging of the Waiohine a month later. Later in 1880, the line opened all the way through to Masterton.

=== North Wairarapa section ===
The northern Wairarapa was more rugged and isolated, and construction was slower and more difficult. Mauriceville, 20 kilometres (12 mi) north of Masterton, was reached on 14 June 1886, followed by the next 6 kilometres (3.7 mi) to Mangamahoe on 10 January 1887. The 10 kilometres (6.2 mi) between Mangamahoe and Eketāhuna included the 150-metre (490 ft) long Wiwaka tunnel, the only tunnel between the Rimutaka Incline and Woodville, and the section was opened on 8 April 1889. Construction of the 4 kilometres (2.5 mi) section to Newman was inexplicably slow, not completed until 1896. Pahiatua was reached in May 1897, including the Mangatainoka River bridge, the longest bridge on the line at 162 metres (531 ft). Mangatainoka is 24 kilometres (15 mi) from the bridge and the railway reached it in August 1897, and the line was finally opened to Woodville and a junction with the Palmerston North - Gisborne Line on 11 December 1897.

=== Branch Lines ===
Four branch lines diverge from the Wairarapa Line: the Melling Branch and the Gracefield Branch to Hutt Workshops, both still open; the Greytown Branch, closed in 1953, and the Hutt Park Railway, which ceased serving its intended purpose in 1906 but survived in truncated form as an industrial siding until 1982. At one time a branch line to Martinborough was proposed but this line never eventuated.

== Deviations ==
Several upgrades and alterations to the Wairarapa Line have been made, but only the Western Hutt and Rimutaka tunnel deviations have significantly altered its route.

=== Hutt deviation ===
In 1925, construction began on what was then known as the Hutt Valley Branch, leaving the main line just north of Petone station and running east to Waterloo, opening on 26 May 1927. After World War II, new state housing suburbs developed north of Waterloo, and the railway was extended to serve them. In 1954, it re-joined the western line south of Manor Park and superseded the old route. On 1 March 1954 the former Hutt Valley Branch became part of the Wairarapa Line. The western route was truncated into the Melling Branch from Petone, with the Lower Hutt railway station becoming the Western Hutt railway station.

=== Silversteam deviation ===
The deviation included a new bridge across the Hutt River, replacing a section of line now used by Silver Stream Railway

=== Rimutaka deviation ===
The Rimutaka Incline was difficult, costly and time-consuming to operate, but as the Wairarapa Line had become a secondary route since the acquisition of the Wellington and Manawatu Railway in 1908, its replacement was not a priority. Various alternate systems and routes were debated, with a tunnel chosen in 1936. However, the economic conditions left from the Great Depression followed by the impact of World War II meant that work on the tunnel did not start until 1948. The Incline and the line up the western side of the Rimutakas closed on 29 October 1955 and the tunnel opened on 3 November 1955.

== Operation ==
=== Passenger services ===
When the full line opened in 1897, passenger services from the Hutt Valley to Wellington were augmented by NZR's first express from Wellington, the Napier Express (the WMR had operated the Wellington-Longburn portion of the New Plymouth Express). After the acquisition of the WMR, the Napier Express was re-routed to the quicker west coast route in early 1909 and the Wairarapa Mail was introduced to provide a regular service through the Wairarapa to Woodville. In 1936, RM class Wairarapa railcars were introduced; these were designed to operate at speed over the Rimutaka Incline and provided a much quicker service to Wellington and local Wairarapa services. They originally augmented the Wairarapa Mail but replaced it in 1948. Carriage trains operated only at peak times of the year when the railcar capacity was exceeded; in 1955, the Incline's closure meant the Wairarapa railcars were withdrawn and 88 seater railcars were introduced, boosting capacity at off-peak times. One Wairarapa railcar has survived and is currently under restoration by the Pahiatua Railcar Society. Mixed trains also operated until the 1950s.

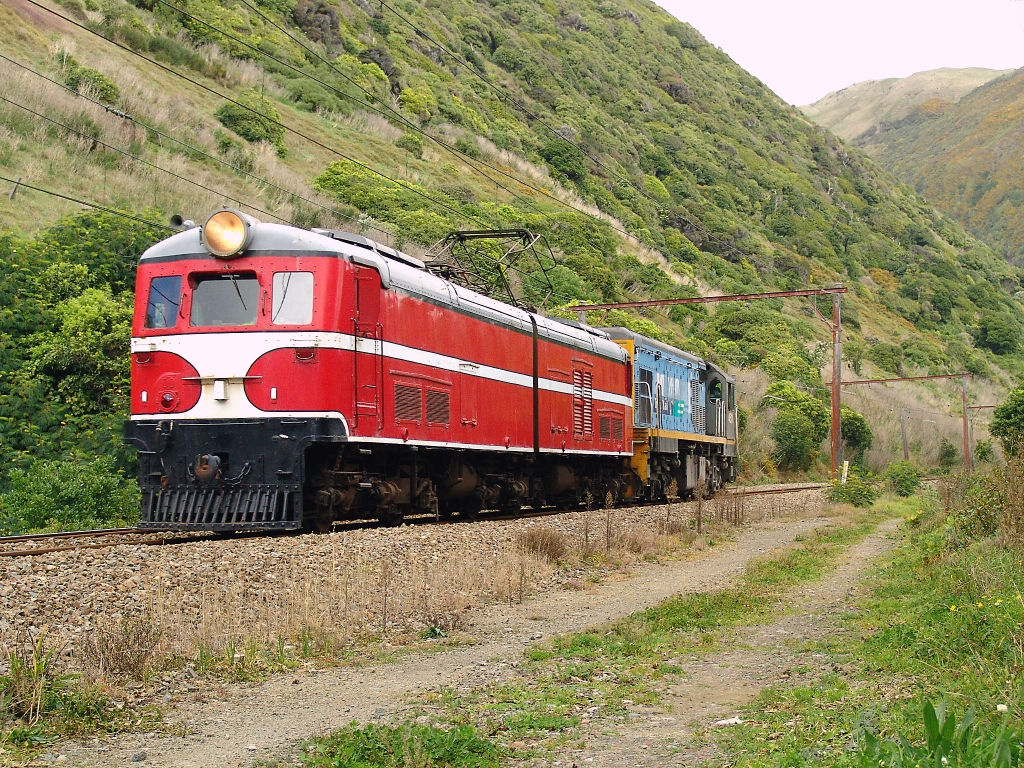
EW1805, which operated on the Hutt Valley Line. It survived for preservation and is seen here with DC4611 near Paekākāriki on the North Island Main Trunk railway.

In the 1950s, the Hutt Valley line was electrified using the 1500 V DC system already operating from Wellington to Johnsonville and Paekākāriki. The electrification was opened to Taitā on 12 October 1953 and Upper Hutt on 24 July 1955, allowing for a more intensive suburban commuter service to Wellington. Originally operated by DM/D class electric multiple units and carriage trains hauled by ED and EW class electric locomotives, the carriage trains and many of the DM/D units were phased out upon the introduction of the "Ganz-Mavag" EM/ET class units in the early 1980s. The "Matangi" FP/FT class was introduced on the Hutt Valley Line in 2011–12, initially relegating the Ganz Mavag units to peak services only before being completely replacing them from 2015.

Railcar services were withdrawn in 1977, and carriage trains were re-instated progressively from early 1964. Until 1963, a railcar service operated on Friday evenings between Masterton and Woodville, and in December that year the decision was taken to replace the morning railcar to Wellington with a carriage train as over 200 passengers wished to use the railcar service that had a capacity of just 176. The final railcar service was replaced by carriage trains in December 1977; some of the carriage trains from this point until the mid-1980s were made up of de-motorised former 88-seater railcars known as "grassgrubs" in New Zealand railfan jargon. Passenger services through the lowly populated northern Wairarapa survived due to the poor roads in the area, but as they were improved, demand for the trains declined. Masterton – Palmerston North passenger trains ceased from Monday, 1 August 1988 with the last such service running on Friday, 29 July. In the 1990s, the service between Masterton and Wellington was rebranded as the Wairarapa Connection and presently operates five times each way weekdays (with a sixth service in the evening on Fridays), and twice each way on weekends and public holidays. In 2007, eighteen new SW class carriages were introduced to replace the 56ft carriages used since the service's inception; in 2013, they were joined by the six SE class to relieve capacity constraints especially on evening services.

The Wellington Metro Rail Upgrade project (2020-2021) started in November 2019; taking about eighteen months and costing $300 million. The single-track Trentham-Upper Hutt section was double-tracked and equipped for bi-directional signalling so that trains can run on either track in either direction between Upper Hutt and Trentham (and possibly later to Heretaunga). Signalling, track and three bridges were renewed, with a longer loop at Upper Hutt to hold longer Wairarapa log trains. The work is expected to improve the operation of both suburban passenger trains to Upper Hutt and the Wairarapa Connection.

=== Freight services ===
Until the acquisition of the WMR in December 1908, all NZR freight out of Wellington was carried on the Wairarapa Line. As soon as the western route became available, all freight that could be diverted off the Wairarapa Line was diverted, due to the difficulties created by the Rimutaka Incline. This meant that even some traffic from the northern Wairarapa was sent through the Manawatū Gorge and down the west coast to Wellington. The opening of the Rimutaka Tunnel made the line more desirable for through freight traffic, but as localised freight gave way to containerised inter-city freight in the 1980s, the significance of the Wairarapa Line declined, especially on the section north of Masterton.

KiwiRail is currently investigating a log shipment hub in Masterton that would mean log traffic would use the northern portion of the Wairarapa Line, from Masterton to Napier.

In February 2012, it was reported that the total freight carried on the northern section of the line had increased from 74,031 tonnes in 2009 to 97,139 tonnes in 2011, although this figure was inflated by a ten-day closure of the Manawatū Gorge section of the railway line due to a slip.

Presently freight services operate at each end of the line. Log and other wood-related traffic is moved between Wellington and Waingawa, just south of Masterton, with one overnight and one daylight return service on weekdays, and a daylight service operates both weekend days. Two freight trains operate from Palmerston North to Pahiatua and return on weekdays, the first in the early hours of the morning and the second in the afternoon. No freights currently operate regularly at weekends.

KiwiRail ceased running timetabled revenue services on the Masterton–Pahiatua section of the line in February 2015, transferring the Sunday Wellington to Palmerston North via Woodville run to the NIMT. However, they have undertaken to keep it open and maintain it to an operational standard, in part because it is still in use by heritage operators, particularly the Pahiatua Railcar Society and Steam Incorporated.

The Masterton—Pahiatua section was to have been temporary reopened between December 2024 and February 2025 to enable the Waingawa logging traffic to be diverted via Woodville and Palmerston North, due to track upgrades requiring a 46-day closure of the Remutaka Tunnel. The Masterton-Pahiatua section was to have been reopened for freight between 27 December 2024 and 9 February 2025 for at least one log train a day from the Wairarapa to Palmerston North and Wellington. However, it was found that two bridges near Newman required upgrading, and the cost of upgrading did not justify such a short reopening of the line.

=== Rolling stock ===
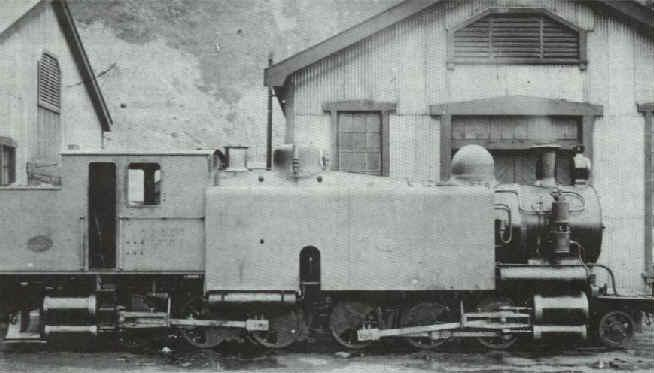
E 66 at Petone Workshops in February 1906, just after it was built.

Single-Fairlie S class worked between Wellington and Summit until replaced by Wd class in 1901. In the late nineteenth century, the first members of the K class to operate in the North Island were transferred from the South Island to work the Napier Express. They were augmented by members of the M and N classes. In the twentieth century, typical locomotives included members of the A and A^{B} class. The Rimutaka Incline was almost always operated by the six members of the H class built specifically for it. In 1906 E 66 was built for the Incline but did not prove as successful as the six H locomotives and was retired in 1917.

When the Rimutaka Tunnel opened in November 1955, the Wairarapa Line became the first in New Zealand to be fully dieselised as steam locomotives were unable to pass through the tunnel. Initially, D^{E} and D^{G} class diesels were employed, and they were soon joined by the D^{A} class. Until 1967, the Wairarapa Line was the only way D^{A} class locomotives could access Wellington due to tunnels south of Paekākāriki being too small.

In the 1980s, the DG class had been fully withdrawn and the DA class in the process of withdrawal or conversion to the DC class; accordingly motive power on the Wairarapa Line changed. Until 2015, the DC class was the mainstay of the Wairarapa line south of Masterton, with locomotives of the DBR, DF/DFT and DX classes occasionally used. In July 2015, the DFT class took over services on the line.

As of November 2021, rolling stock regularly used on the Wairarapa Line include:

Class	Image	Type	Cars per set	Number	Operator	Routes	Built
FP/FT; Matangi		EMU	2	83	Transdev Wellington/Metlink	Wellington suburban services (Wellington–Upper Hutt)	2010–12, 2015–16
SW		carriage	6–8	18	Transdev Wellington/Metlink	Wairarapa Connection services (Wellington–Masterton)	1971–75
SE		carriage	6	6	Transdev Wellington/Metlink	Wairarapa Connection services (Wellington–Masterton)	1971–75
DFB		diesel locomotive		5	KiwiRail	Wairarapa Connection services (Wellington–Masterton); Wellington–Masterton freight	1979–81

==== Future ====
Improvements planned for the Wairarapa Line beyond Upper Hutt from 2021 to 2024 include track renewals with full renewal in the Remutaka and Maoribank tunnels, renewals of timber elements in three bridges, refurbishments of some level crossings and drainage and vegetation clearing.

In November 2021, Greater Wellington Regional Council proposed the purchase of tri-mode multiple units for the line, similar to bi-mode multiple units used overseas. In 2023 it was announced that 18 four-car trains will be built for Capital Connection and Wairarapa services.

===== Electrification =====
Proposals have been made to extend the electrification into the Wairarapa and the Rimutaka Tunnel was constructed to allow overhead lines to be installed, although before opening diesel operation was adopted. In 2007, the Greater Wellington Regional Council rejected a call for the line to be electrified to Masterton, stating that patronage was too low to justify the capital expenditure.

In May 2021, KiwiRail, Beca and Systra published the North Island Electrification Study, which put forward two options for electrification expansion for the Wairarapa Line from Upper Hutt to Masterton:

- Option 1: electrify the entire section at 25kV AC (same system as Auckland and central NIMT), with a voltage changeover at Upper Hutt;
- Option 2: use battery-electric EMUs with two 7 km long overhead segments around Featherston and Masterton at 1600V DC.

The estimated costs of option 1 was $226m, with option 2 being $82m.

=== Signalling ===
The Wairarapa line used four of the six New Zealand railway signalling systems: Double Line Automatic (DLA), Centralised Traffic Control (CTC), Track Warrant Control (TWC) and Station Limits. Signalling at Petone is future-proofed for conversion to a fifth system, Automatic Signalling Rules (ASR).

The Wairarapa Line had a number of lasts for railway signalling in New Zealand:

- Semaphore Signal on an operational line, these were decommissioned in 1996 however the masts (poles) remained in place until July 2014
- Line controlled by Tyers Electric Train Tablet
- Staffed signal box outside of a major station

Prior to the Trentham–Upper Hutt–Featherston section being transferred to Train Control in February 2007, this was the last section with CTC controlled by a signalman. Part-time signal boxes remained at Petone (weekday peak and inter-peak) and at Taitā (weekday peak) until December 2013 and July 2014 respectively, when signalling was switched to Train Control in central Wellington.

Masterton is a unique signalling arrangement with Track Warrant Control ending at 'TWC Ends' boards north of the two-position home signal, which allows shunting movements to be carried out without the need for a Track Warrant. Along with Horotiu (on the NIMT between Te Rapa and Ngāruawāhia) Masterton still has Woods Points Keys. The Horotiu ones are not in regular use.

== Heritage ==
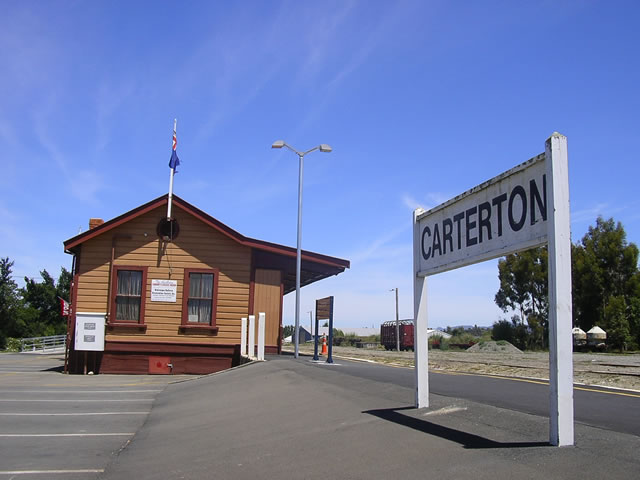
Carterton railway station, base of the Wairarapa Railway Restoration Society Inc.

Eight railway preservation organisations are based on or close by the Wairarapa Line.

=== New Zealand Railway and Locomotive Society ===
NZRLS has a workshop based at the northern end of the Silver Stream Railway where members restoring three Wellington and Manawatu Railway Company carriages. It also has an archives building beside Ava railway station in Lower Hutt.

=== Silver Stream Railway ===
The Silver Stream Railway is a heritage railway in Silversteam, Wellington. It regularly operates preserved New Zealand Railways Department locomotives along a restored section of the Hutt Valley Line (part of the Wairarapa Line), deviated in 1954.

=== Rimutaka Incline Railway Heritage Trust ===
The Rimutaka Incline Railway Heritage Trust is based at Maymorn railway station and its ultimate goal is to return the Rimutaka Incline to full operational condition as a tourist attraction.

=== Fell Engine Museum ===
The Fell Engine Museum is a short walk from Featherston station and includes preserved H 199, the sole Fell steam locomotive (NZR H class) left in the world. The museum also has a Fell brake van and other railway-related items of historical significance.

=== Woodside Station Preservation Society ===
The Woodside Station Preservation Society focuses its activities on the 146 year-old Woodside railway station building.

=== Wairarapa Railway Restoration Society ===
The Wairarapa Railway Restoration Society focuses its activities on the Historic Carterton railway station complex, which includes a museum inside Carterton's historic station building, rolling stock in the station yard, and other heritage items.

=== Pahiatua Railcar Society ===
The Pahiatua Railcar Society is at Pahiatua railway station, which is no longer served by passenger trains but maintained by the society. It has the only surviving Wairarapa and 88-seater railcars and is restoring them to operational condition; it also has an operational Standard railcar.

=== Woodville Railway Station Trust ===
The Woodville Railway Station Trust was formed in 2018 to preserve and restore the 61 year-old Woodville Railway Station building.

== Features ==
=== Stations ===
==== Wellington Section ====
Distance from Wellington	Name	Location	Image	Notes
—N/a	Te Aro	41°17′30.28″S 174°46′54.47″E		Terminus of the Te Aro Extension from 1893 to 1917.
—N/a	Lambton	41°16′42.52″S 174°46′46.11″E		One of two Wellington stations, this was the government counterpart to the WMR Thorndon station and was the terminus of the Wairarapa Line prior to the opening of the combined Wellington station in 1937.
0.00 km (0.00 mi)	Wellington	41°16′43″S 174°46′51″E		This station became the combined terminus for both the North Island Main Trunk and the Wairarapa Line when it opened in 1937.
—N/a	Pipitea Point			This was Wellington's first railway station and operated from 1874 to 1884.
2.55 km (1.58 mi)	Kaiwharawhara	41°15′36.18″S 174°47′28.92″E		Both the North Island Main Trunk and Wairarapa Line are served by this station which opened in 1874. Kaiwharawhara Station was closed suddenly in June 2013 as it was discovered how badly corroded the overbridge was. In November 2013, the GWRC voted to close it permanently as on health and safety grounds, it was too expensive and nearly impossible to upgrade the station to provide step free access via ramps for disabled passengers.
4.80 km (2.98 mi)	Ngauranga	41°14′55.20″S 174°48′48.88″E		Ngauranga was opened at the same time as Kaiwharawhara and is one of the oldest stations on the line. It was moved from its original site in 1965 due to harbour reclamations and line deviations built during the 20th century.
Wellington did have another railway station, Thorndon railway station, built by the Wellington and Manawatu Railway Company (WMR or W&MR), but this station did not serve the Wairarapa Line but instead the North Island Main Trunk (NIMT) via Johnsonville.
==== Western Hutt Section ==== Petone – Melling, became Melling Branch 1 March 1954; Melling – Haywards, closed 28 February 1954
Distance from Hutt Valley Junction	Name	Location	Image	Notes
1.37 km (0.85 mi)	Western Hutt	41°12′43.22″S 174°53′23.48″E		Originally known as Lower Hutt and located on the Wairarapa Line, it became a station on the Melling Branch in 1954. It was the terminus of the first section of railway line to open in the Wellington region, and marked the northernmost extent of double-track operations on the Western Hutt section.
2.99 km (1.86 mi)	Melling	41°12′13.12″S 174°54′18.94″E		This station serves the suburb of Melling and was originally on the Wairarapa Line. It became the terminus of the Melling Branch in 1954. It was originally on the northern side of the Melling Link road but was moved to its present location when the branch opened.
5.22 km (3.24 mi)	Belmont			This station served the suburb of Belmont on the Wairarapa Line prior to the closure of this section.
6.65 km (4.13 mi)	Andrews			Replaced Pitcaithly's in 1938 and closed in 1954.
	Pitcaithly's			Became a tablet station in 1906 and was later replaced by Andrews, a short distance to the south, in 1938.
==== Hutt Valley Section ====
Distance from Wellington	Name	Location	Image	Notes
10.50 km (6.52 mi)	Petone	41°13′19.91″S 174°52′9.89″E		This station serves Petone, a suburb of Hutt City. It is at the junction of the Wairarapa Line with the Melling Branch.
12.52 km (7.78 mi)	Ava	41°13′10.52″S 174°53′30.06″E		This station serves the suburb of Ava, and was one of the original stations on the Hutt Valley Branch prior to it becoming part of the Wairarapa Line.
14.37 km (8.93 mi)	Woburn	41°13′14.51″S 174°54′40.22″E		This station serves the suburb of Woburn and was one of the first stations on the Hutt Valley Branch. It is located at the junction of the Gracefield Branch with the Wairarapa Line.
15.50 km (9.63 mi)	Waterloo	41°12′49.77″S 174°55′15.95″E		This station serves Hutt City and is a major public transport interchange. It was the original terminus of the Hutt Valley Branch from 1927 to 1946, and was the northern terminus of double-track operations until 1947.
16.54 km (10.28 mi)	Epuni	41°12.458′S 174°55.809′E		This station serves the suburb of Epuni and was opened in 1946 when the Hutt Valley Branch was extended north to Naenae.
18.25 km (11.34 mi)	Naenae	41°11.876′S 174°56.754′E		This station serves the suburb of Naenae and was opened in 1946 when it became the second northern terminus of the Hutt Valley Branch. It was the northern terminus of double-track operations from 1947 to 1953.
19.49 km (12.11 mi)	Wingate	41°11.321′S 174°57.279′E		This station serves the suburb of Wingate and was opened in 1950.
20.55 km (12.77 mi)	Taitā	41°10.832′S 174°57.639′E		This station serves the suburb of Taitā and was opened in 1947. It was the northern terminus of double-track operations from 1953 until the Hutt Valley Branch became part of the Wairarapa Line in 1954.
21.98 km (13.66 mi)	Pomare	41°10.159′S 174°58.189′E		This station serves the suburb of Pomare and was opened when the Hutt Valley Branch became part of the Wairarapa Line in 1954.
23.70 km (14.73 mi)	Manor Park	41°09′22.87″S 174°58′44.07″E		This station serves the suburb of Manor Park. It was known as Haywards prior to the opening of the Hutt Valley Deviation in 1954, and was briefly the northern terminus of double-track operations when the Hutt Valley Deviation opened.
	Silverstream Bridge	41°9′4.07″S 174°59′41.37″E		This station was on the Wairarapa Line until bypassed by the opening of the Silverstream Deviation in 1954. It was renamed "McKirdy" when the Silver Stream Railway commenced operations and today serves heritage trains on the Silver Stream Railway only.
26.83 km (16.67 mi)	Silverstream	41°08′50.42″S 175°00′38.63″E		This station serves the suburb of Silverstream and was opened along with the Silverstream Deviation in 1954.
28.24 km (17.55 mi)	Heretaunga	41°08′32.37″S 175°01′33.20″E		This station serves the suburb of Heretaunga and was opened in 1908.
29.40 km (18.27 mi)	Trentham	41°08′15.76″S 175°02′19.09″E		This station serves the suburb of Trentham and was opened in 1907. It was the northern terminus of double-track operations on the Wairarapa Line from 1955 to 2021.
31.30 km (19.45 mi)	Wallaceville	41°07′50.82″S 175°03′29.30″E		This station serves the suburb of Wallaceville and was opened in 1879.
32.40 km (20.13 mi)	Upper Hutt	41°7′34.11″S 175°4′13.77″E		This station serves the city of Upper Hutt and was opened in 1876. It marks the northernmost extent of electric and double-track operations on the Wairarapa Line.
==== Rimutaka Section ==== Section closed 30 October 1955; Rimutaka Deviation opened 3 November 1955
Distance from Wellington	Name	Location	Image	Notes
	Mangaroa	41°7′16.58″S 175°6′37.48″E		One of the original stations on the Rimutaka section, this station served the small settlement of Mangaroa. Closed in 1955 along with the old route over the Rimutaka Range.
	Kaitoke	41°5′4.22″S 175°10′5.02″E		One of the original stations on the Rimutaka section, this station served the small settlement of Kaitoke. Closed in 1955 along with the old route over the Rimutaka Range.
	Summit	41°8′41.29″S 175°11′48.93″E		One of the original stations on the Rimutaka section, this station existed solely to serve the operational requirements of the Rimutaka Incline. Closed in 1955 along with the old route over the Rimutaka Range.
	Cross Creek	41°10′3.39″S 175°12′56.64″E		One of the original stations on the Rimutaka section, this station existed solely to serve the operational requirements of the Rimutaka Incline. Closed in 1955 along with the old route over the Rimutaka Range.
	Pigeon Bush	41°9′7.69″S 175°16′12.63″E		One of the original stations on the Rimutaka section, this station served the South Wairarapa region around the area known as Pigeon Bush. Closed in 1955 along with the old route over the Rimutaka Range.
38.75 km (24.08 mi)	Maymorn	41°6′29″S 175°8′3″E		Opened in 1955 as the only station on the Rimutaka Deviation. Originally known as Mangaroa.
The Rimutaka Loop, located at 48.41 km (30.08 mi), was opened in 1955 as a remote crossing loop on the Rimutaka Deviation on the Wairarapa Side of the tunnel and closed in November 1990. Though not a station in the true sense it is a significant location signalling-wise due to its treatment as a fully interlocked passing/crossing loop.
==== South Wairarapa Section ====
Distance from Wellington	Name	Location	Image	Notes
57.15 km (35.51 mi)	Featherston	41°6′47.74″S 175°19′48.85″E		This station serves the town of Featherston.
60.98 km (37.89 mi)	Fernside	41°5′17.69″S 175°21′38.97″E		This now closed station served the small settlement of Fernside, north of Featherston.
65.12 km (40.46 mi)	Woodside	41°4′2.61″S 175°24′7.05″E		This station serves the small settlement of Woodside, and Greytown by bus.
69.61 km (43.25 mi)	Matarawa	41°2′55.78″S 175°26′53.31″E		This station serves the small settlement of Matarawa.
73.48 km (45.66 mi)	Dalefield	41°2′12.05″S 175°29′26.08″E		This now closed station served the small settlement of Dalefield, south of Carterton.
76.60 km (47.60 mi)	Carterton	41°1′18″S 175°31′23.89″E		This station serves the town of Carterton.
79.33 km (49.29 mi)	Clareville	41°0′16.51″S 175°32′48.35″E		This station, closed in 1970, served the small settlement of Clareville, north of Carterton.
83.40 km (51.82 mi)	Middleton	40°58′44.94″S 175°34′54.15″E		This small flag station was closed not long after the line opened, in 1891.
85.11 km (52.88 mi)	Waingawa	40°58′8.47″S 175°35′46.82″E		This station, now closed to passengers, serves neighbouring industrial customers.
88.09 km (54.74 mi)	Solway	40°57′11.94″S 175°37′30.72″E		This station serves the suburb of Solway, in Masterton.
89.40 km (55.55 mi)	Renall Street	40°56.856′S 175°38.322′E		This station serves the area around Renall Street, Masterton.
90.96 km (56.52 mi)	Masterton	40°56.420′S 175°39.321′E		This station serves the town of Masterton. It marks the northernmost extent of the Wellington suburban passenger network.
==== North Wairarapa Section ==== Closed to passengers 1 August 1988
Distance from Wellington	Name	Location	Image	Notes
97.25 km (60.43 mi)	Opaki	40°53′17.14″S 175°39′41.64″E		This station served the small settlement of Opaki.
103.53 km (64.33 mi)	Kopuaranga	40°49′57.82″S 175°39′51.18″E		This station served the small settlement of Kopuaranga.
110.56 km (68.70 mi)	Mauriceville	40°46′45.08″S 175°42′0.42″E		This station served the small settlement of Mauriceville.
116.57 km (72.43 mi)	Mangamahoe	40°43′47.70″S 175°43′31.44″E		This station served the small settlement of Mangamahoe.
126.82 km (78.80 mi)	Eketahuna	40°38′58.37″S 175°42′23.46″E		This station served the town of Eketahuna.
130.18 km (80.89 mi)	Newman	40°37′19.17″S 175°42′40.83″E		This station served the small settlement of Newman.
137.28 km (85.30 mi)	Hukanui	40°34′1.10″S 175°41′40.02″E		This station served the small settlement of Hukanui. Decommisned about 1977, Closed to passengers approx 1981. Station included Postoffice, Good Shed and Loading bank.
144.82 km (89.99 mi)	Mangamaire	40°30′46.65″S 175°44′47.86″E		This station served the small settlement of Mangamaire.
147.91 km (91.91 mi)	Konini	40°29′35.54″S 175°45′44.94″E		This station served the small settlement of Konini.
154.62 km (96.08 mi)	Pahiatua	40°26′42.12″S 175°48′54.42″E		This station served the town of Pahiatua.
159.10 km (98.86 mi)	Mangatainoka	40°24′49.47″S 175°51′44.60″E		This station served the small settlement of Mangatainoka.
163.89 km (101.84 mi)	Ngawapurua	40°22′51.52″S 175°53′38.68″E		This station served the small settlement of Ngawapurua.
171.50 km (106.57 mi)	Woodville	40°20′42″S 175°52′03″E		This station served the town of Woodville.

=== Private sidings ===
Currently the only private siding in use is at Fonterra at Pahiatua. The sidings remain at Taratahi but the main line points were removed around 2003 (Ravensdown Fertiliser). Lime Works at Mauriceville are also still connected to the network but are overgrown and covered with lime. The former siding at Eurocell (Parapine) in Upper Hutt closed in 2012.

Extensive sidings at Petone, Naenae (where the goods shed remains, in non-rail use), Taitā (Unilever) and Trentham (Army) have been closed and removed. Other former sidings include one used by oil companies between Renall St and Masterton stations; disused sidings at Mauriceville and Eketahuna; the Ngauranga Industrial Siding to an abattoir in the Ngauranga Gorge; and a siding to the Featherston Military Camp north of Featherston during World War I.

=== Tunnels ===
Nine tunnels have been constructed on the various routes of the Wairarapa Line. Of these, only three are now in use for railway purposes, and only the Wiwaka tunnel in northern Wairarapa (150m; between Mangamahoe & Eketahuna) has remained unaffected by deviations since the line opened.

Five of these tunnels are now part of the Rimutaka Rail Trail: Mangaroa, Pakuratahi, Summit, Siberia and Prices. The Rimutaka Incline Railway project hopes to incorporate these tunnels into its restored railway line across the Rimutaka Ranges.

==== Original route ====
From Wellington to Woodville:

- Cruickshanks Tunnel (120m)
- Mangaroa Tunnel (152m)
- Pakuratahi Tunnel (73m)
- Summit Tunnel (584m)
- Siberia Tunnel (108m)
- Prices Tunnel (98m)
- Wiwaka Tunnel (150m)

==== Current route ====
From Wellington to Woodville:

- Maoribank Tunnel (572m) (in the Hutt Valley)
- Rimutaka Tunnel (8,798m)
- Wiwaka Tunnel (150m) Now No 3, between Mangamahoe and Eketahuna; summit 286m high

== See also ==
- Wairarapa Connection
- Hutt Valley Line
- Palmerston North - Gisborne Line
- Te Aro Extension
- Pahiatua Railcar Society
