= Wellington Heritage Multiple Unit Preservation Trust =

Organisation in New Zealand

Coordinates: 41°6′32.14″S 175°8′0.14″E

The Wellington Heritage Multiple Unit Preservation Trust (WHMUPT) was formed in 2012 to preserve English Electric EMU (Electric multiple unit) set D 2130, DM 556 and D 2411 (otherwise known as the "Cyclops"). The trust is based at Maymorn near the Rimutaka Incline Railway Heritage Trust (RIRHT). The trust is a member of the Federation of Rail Organisations of New Zealand. The trust is a registered charity under the Charitable Trusts Act.

The English Electric set was purchased in January 2013 and arrived at their base on 21 April of the same year. One trailer from this unit has been used as a passenger carriage by the RIRHT for their operational running days, and is stored undercover.

In June 2018, the group purchased a Ganz-Mavag EMU from Greater Wellington Regional Council for the symbolic price of $1. The unit had been sold to an overseas buyer previously, but the deal had fallen through and was in the process of being disposed of by burial when the deal was reached to preserve the unit. The unit has been stored in Wellington railway yard awaiting a move to Maymorn to join Cyclops, with some graffiti removal work undertaken on the unit.

In February 2022, the Ganz Mavag unit was moved from the Wellington yard where it was stored at the Hutt Workshops. The Rail Heritage Trust of New Zealand (RHT) said the unit would be moving to Maymorn still, but its new caretakers would be the Rimutaka Incline Railway Heritage Trust instead and that the move to Hutt Workshops was for a limited time while RHT funded the move to Maymorn. The RHT indicated that the WHMUPT was essentially defunct. It is not known at present whether the RIRHT are also to become the new owners of the Cyclops unit as well.
