= Mangamaire railway station =

Defunct railway station in New Zealand

Mangamaire
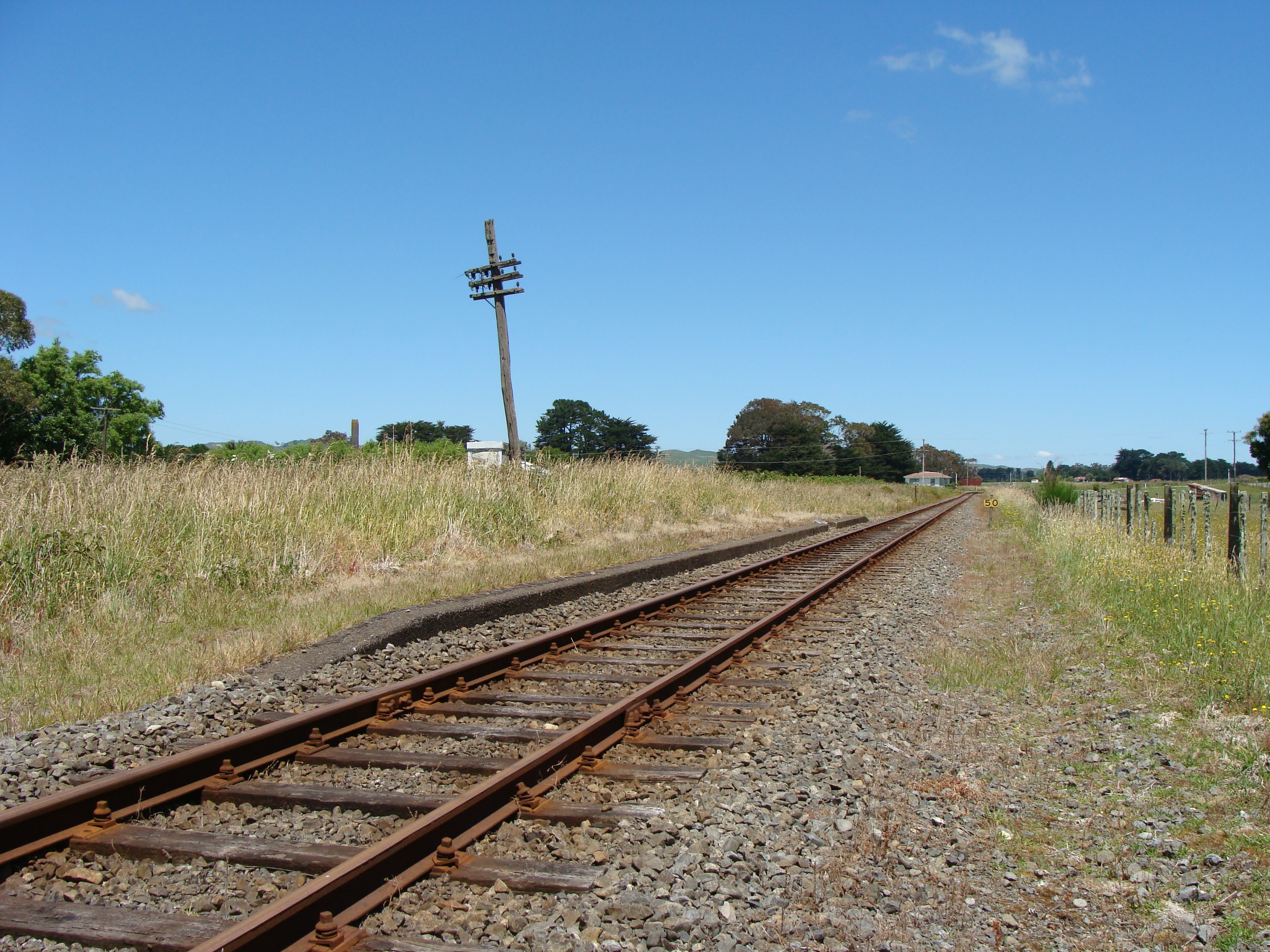
- Mangamaire railway station, looking south towards Tutaekara Road. 28 December 2008.

General information
- Location: Tutaekara Road; Pahiatua 4987; New Zealand
- Coordinates: 40°30′47.65″S 175°44′48.83″E
- Elevation: 160 metres (520 ft)
- System: New Zealand Government Railways (NZGR); Regional rail
- Line: Wairarapa Line
- Distance: 144.82 kilometres (89.99 mi) from Wellington
- Platforms: Single side

Construction
- Structure type: at-grade
- Parking: No

History
- Opened: 5 January 1897
- Closed: 1 August 1988
Location
Notes
- Previous Station: Hukanui Station; Next Station: Konini Station

The Mangamaire railway station on the Wairarapa Line was located in the Tararua District of the Manawatū-Whanganui region in New Zealand’s North Island.

The station opened on 5 January 1897 and closed on 1 August 1988.
