= Konini railway station =

Defunct railway station in New Zealand

Konini
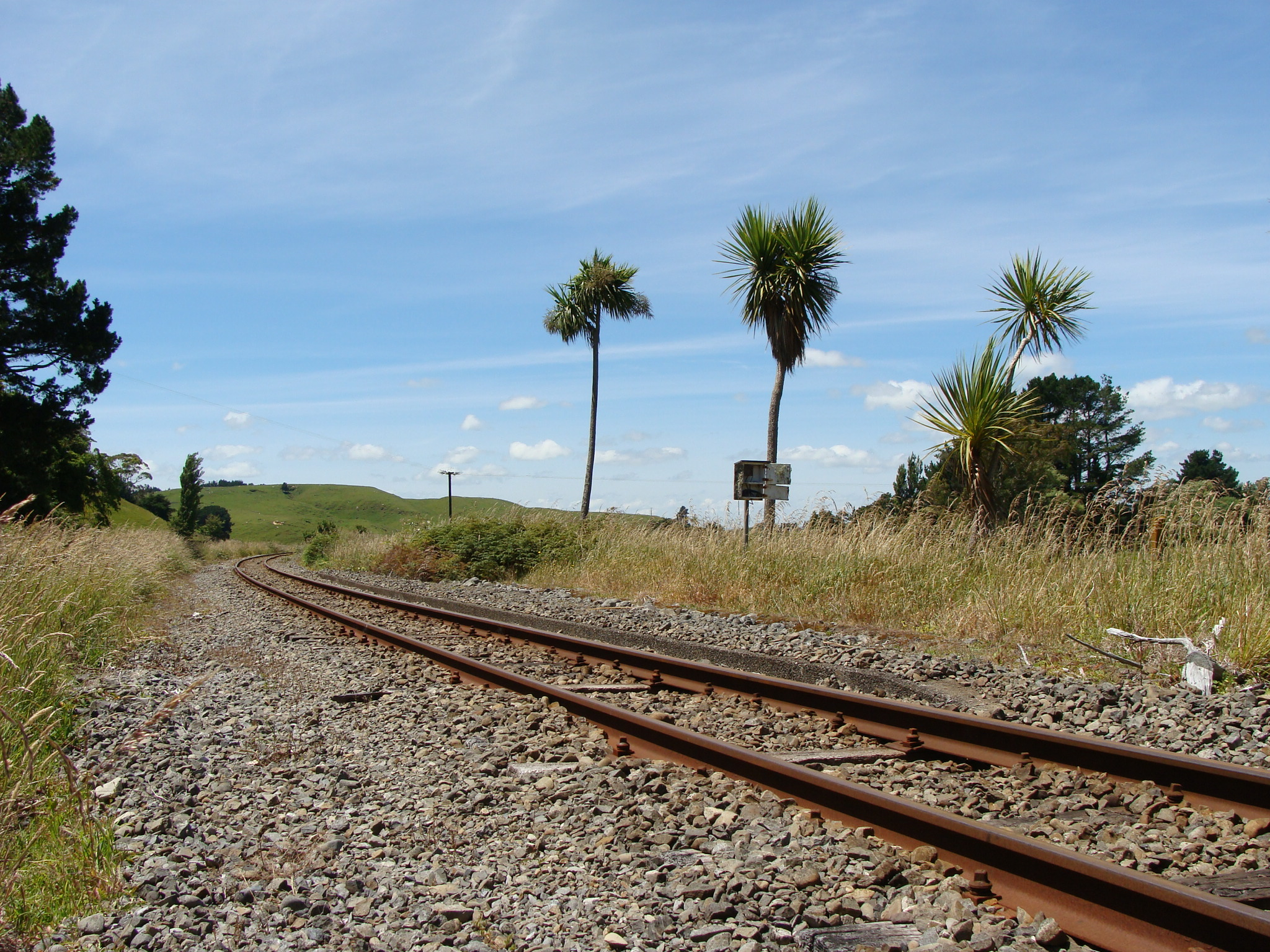
- Remains of Konini railway station in 2008

General information
- Location: Bridge Road; Pahiatua 4987; New Zealand
- Coordinates: 40°29′35.54″S 175°45′44.94″E
- Elevation: 140 metres (460 ft)
- System: New Zealand Government Railways (NZGR); Regional rail
- Line: Wairarapa Line
- Distance: 147.91 kilometres (91.91 mi) from Wellington
- Platforms: Single side

Construction
- Structure type: at-grade
- Parking: No

History
- Opened: 5 January 1897
- Closed: 9 June 1969
Location
Notes
- Previous Station: Mangamaire Station; Next Station: Pahiatua Station

The Konini railway station on the Wairarapa Line was located in the Tararua District of the Manawatū-Whanganui region in New Zealand’s North Island.

The station opened on 5 January 1897 and closed on 9 June 1969.
