= New Zealand EM class electric multiple unit =

Train formerly used in New Zealand

New Zealand EM/ET class
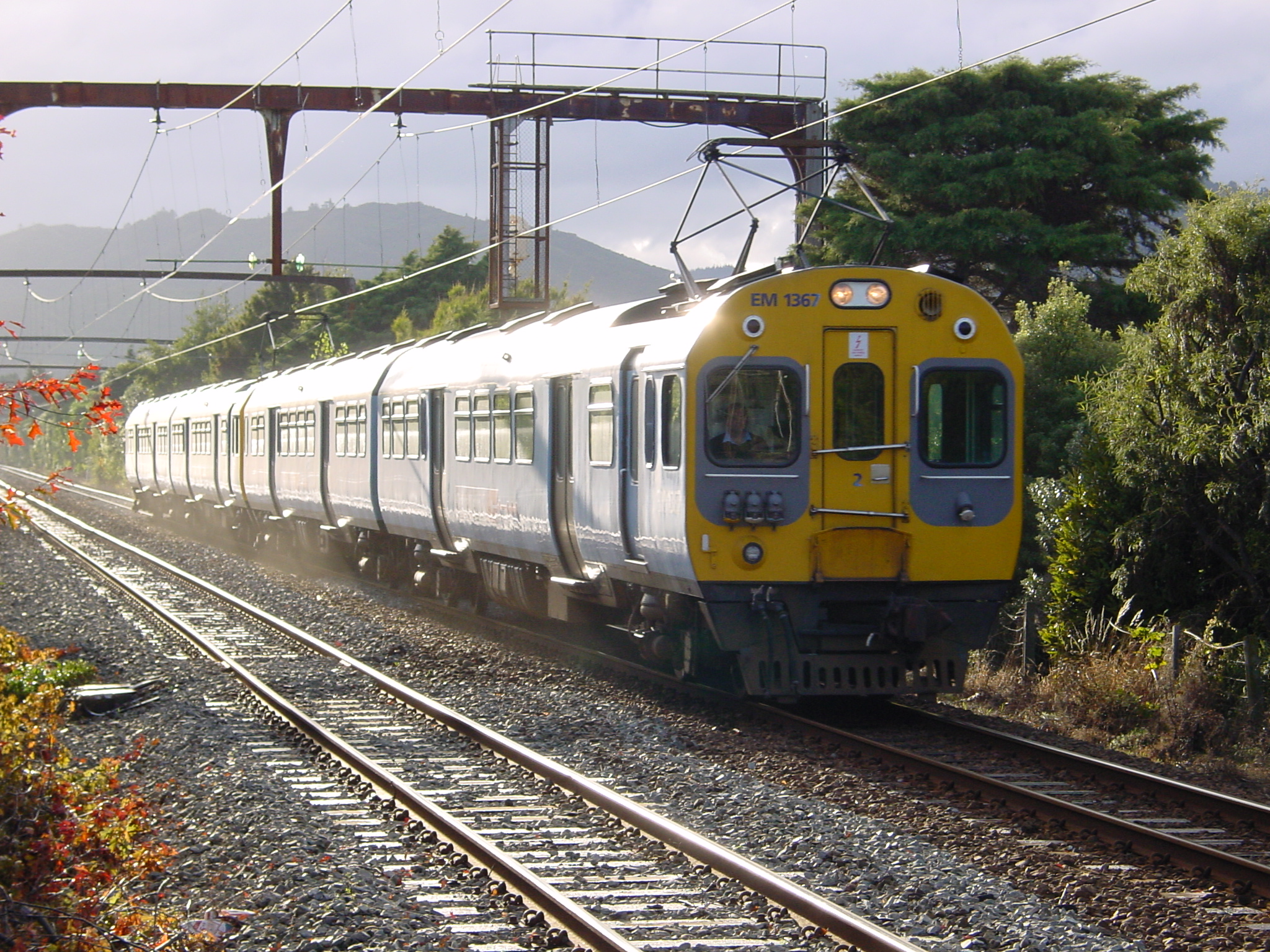
- EM 1367 leading a southbound four-car train on the Hutt Valley Line, 17 May 2003
- In service: 14 June 1982 – 27 May 2016
- Manufacturer: Ganz-MÁVAG
- Built at: Budapest, Hungary
- Replaced: DM/D class; EW class; 56-foot carriages
- Constructed: 1979 – 1982
- Entered service: 14 June 1982 – 11 February 1983
- Refurbished: Tranz Rail 1996 – 2002 (entire fleet); Metlink/Tranz Metro 2010 (one unit)
- Number built: 44
- Number preserved: 2
- Number scrapped: 26
- Formation: EM–ET
- Fleet numbers: EM 1004 – 1528; ET 3004 – 3528
- Capacity: 148 seats
- Operator: Tranz Metro
- Depot: Wellington
- Lines served: Kapiti, Hutt Valley, Melling

Specifications
- Car body construction: 20.73 m (68 ft 1/8 in)
- Train length: 43.06 m (141 ft 3 1/4 in)
- Car length: 21.53 m (70 ft 7 5/8 in) over couplers
- Width: 2.72 m (8 ft 11 1/8 in)
- Height: 3.73 m (12 ft 2 7/8 in) without pantograph
- Platform height: 730 mm (2 ft 5 in)
- Doors: 8 electrically operated sliding twin doors (centrally controlled)
- Maximum speed: 110 km/h (68 mph) (design); 95 km/h (59 mph) (service)
- Weight: EM: 37.6 t (37.0 long tons; 41.4 short tons); ET: 34.5 t (34.0 long tons; 38.0 short tons)
- Traction system: GEC Traction camshaft resistance control
- Traction motors: GEC Traction G316AZ DC motor
- Power output: 400 kW (540 hp)
- Acceleration: 0.75 m/s2
- Power supply: Motor-alternator producing 230/400 V 50 Hz AC
- HVAC: Electric heating
- Electric systems: 1,500 V DC overhead
- Current collection: pantograph
- UIC classification: Bo′Bo′+2′2′
- Braking system: Westinghouse "Westcode" electro-pneumatic brakes (six-step) with automatic air brake backup
- Multiple working: Within class only
- Track gauge: 3 ft 6 in (1,067 mm)

The New Zealand EM/ET class (also known as Ganz-Mavag) electric multiple units were used on suburban services in Wellington, New Zealand, from 1982 to 2016. They were owned initially by the New Zealand Railways Corporation and finally by the Greater Wellington Regional Council (GWRC) and operated by Tranz Metro, part of national railway operator KiwiRail.

The 44 two-car units of an EM motor car and an ET trailer car were introduced between 14 June 1982 – 11 February 1983 on the 1500 V DC electrified Kapiti, Hutt Valley and Melling lines. After the introduction of the Matangi FP/FT class EMUs in 2011–12, they were largely relegated to peak services only. In 2012, the GWRC ordered a second batch of Matangi units to replace the Ganz-Mavag units, and the last units were withdrawn from revenue service on 27 May 2016 after 34 years in service.

The name "Ganz-Mavag" comes from the units' manufacturer, Ganz-MÁVAG of Hungary. It was widely used by the GWRC and in the media to distinguish them from other electric multiple units used on the Wellington suburban lines; they were also referred to as Hungarian units.

== Introduction ==
Tenders to replace Wellington's ageing and unreliable English Electric DM/D class electric multiple units, some of which dated back to 1938, and all carriage-hauled suburban trains in Wellington was announced on 6 March 1978. A total of 13 tenders were received and the response deadline was extended to July 1978.

On 16 March 1979 it was announced that the order had been placed with Hungarian firm Ganz-MÁVAG. The cost was NZ$33 million, then the single largest order by value of rolling stock in the then New Zealand Railways Department's history (the Railways Department became the New Zealand Railways Corporation or NZRC in 1982). This cost was partially offset by a trade agreement involving the Hungarian Government buying New Zealand farm products, chiefly lamb and butter.

The Chief Engineer of NZRC insisted on proven, reliable traction and braking systems being fitted to the new trains. The contract with Ganz-MÁVAG specified GEC Traction of Manchester, England, as traction equipment supplier and Westinghouse Brake & Signal Company of Chippenham, England, as the brake equipment supplier.

The new units included radio telephones to enable drivers to speak with train control, an innovation at the time.

Their introduction resulted in the end of the carriage trains hauled by the EW class electric locomotives, though electric-hauled carriage trains were temporarily reintroduced behind the EO locomotives between 2008 and 2011, and Wairarapa Line carriage services are diesel-hauled. A number of the older DM class units were retained, mainly for use on the Melling and Johnsonville Lines.

The introduction of the units also coincided with the project to extend the electrification on the Kapiti Coast from Paekākāriki to Paraparaumu.

== Service ==
The EM class served as the primary rail commuter vehicle since their introduction in 1982, running in anything from a single unit (2-cars) to an 8-car unit depending on the service being operated. They have also seen service beyond the electrification, being used behind diesel locomotives as carriages to carry people to the annual Toast Martinborough wine festival in the Wairarapa.

The introduction of the new Matangi units from 2010 saw a reduction in the number of services operated by the EM class, with most off-peak services handed over to the Matangi units in June 2012. Initially, only the EMs were able to run in an 8-car formation, something the Matangis were limited in doing owing to the amount of current that they drew from the overhead system; hence the EM class were used on heavily patronised peak services, particularly on the Kapiti Line.

=== Johnsonville Line ===
The class were not operated on the Johnsonville Line due to loading gauge restrictions and limited braking capacity for the steeply graded line. Contrary to a report in The Evening Post, the class were able to operate to Johnsonville. To prove this, New Zealand Rail ran a test train to Johnsonville on 14 June 1992. EM1004 and its trailer ET3004 was pushed by shunting locomotive DSC2285 to measure clearances at platforms and tunnels. While the test was a publicity stunt, and there was never any intention to run the class on the Johnsonville Line, the test did show that the class were able to clear all of the tunnels on the line, albeit with some modifications to track geometry required for in-service operations. These changes and modifications to the tunnels on the line would occur before the Matangi class units were introduced to service.

While tunnel and platform clearances were improved on the line in 2009, it was not envisaged that the units would be used on the line. On 18 April 2010, EM1056 plus trailer ET3056 ran under its own power on a trial to check clearances for the Matangi units.

== Incidents and accidents ==
Three units were involved in a collision north of Plimmerton on 30 September 2010. The northbound train (consisting of EM 1010, ET 3010, EM 1154 and ET 3154) derailed after hitting a slip caused by heavy rain and fouled the southbound line. Less than a minute later it was struck by southbound unit EM 1223 and ET 3223, which did not derail, but the collision caused extensive damage to both cabs. Sixty passengers and crew were on the two trains. Two people were hospitalised. The drivers of the trains were father and son.

The damaged units were initially towed back to the EMU depot north of Wellington station, where later the two undamaged halves - EM 1010 and ET 3223 (renumbered to ET 3010) were marshalled together as a unit. The damaged cars, EM 1223 and the original ET 3010, were towed to storage at Hutt Workshops and used as parts sources.

On 20 May 2013, ET 3309 derailed crossing Wellington Distant Junction, puncturing a hole in the floor. It was the rear car in a two-unit consist operating the 07:43 Porirua to Wellington service, subsequently stranding thousands of morning peak commuters across the network as it blocked both the Kapiti and Hutt Valley lines. All units were temporarily withdrawn after the derailment for urgent safety inspections, but most were back in service for morning peak the next day. Preliminary investigations suggest when one of the unit's spring park brake assemblies was replaced in March 2013, two split pins were not inserted into the bolts securing the assembly to the undercarriage, allowing the assembly to come loose over time and ultimately caused the derailment. Two air reservoir tanks came loose in the accident and pushed the air compressor behind them upwards through the floor, creating the hole.

Other incidents involving EM units include:

- 22 March 1997 – EM 1079 and ET 3079 travelling northbound hit a car on the Sutherland Avenue level crossing, between Heretaunga and Trentham stations. The train had passed the signal immediately before the crossing while at danger, and therefore failed to trigger the crossing alarms.
- 25 August 2011 – EM 1315 and ET 3315 travelling southbound came within metres of hitting two track gangers working on the line south of Paekākāriki. The person in charge of the work site let the unit through the work area on the advice that the line was clear; he was subsequently found to be under the influence of cannabis.
- 28 March 2013 – EM units 1246/3246, 1102/3102 and 1315/3315, operating a Wellington to Taita service, started from Wingate station with the doors open and no passenger staff on board. A trainee driver and their minder thought they heard the "right-away" buzzer and proceeded without double-checking the door open light had gone out. Unlike the later Matangi units, there is no interlock on the EM units preventing the train moving with the doors open.

== Refurbishment ==
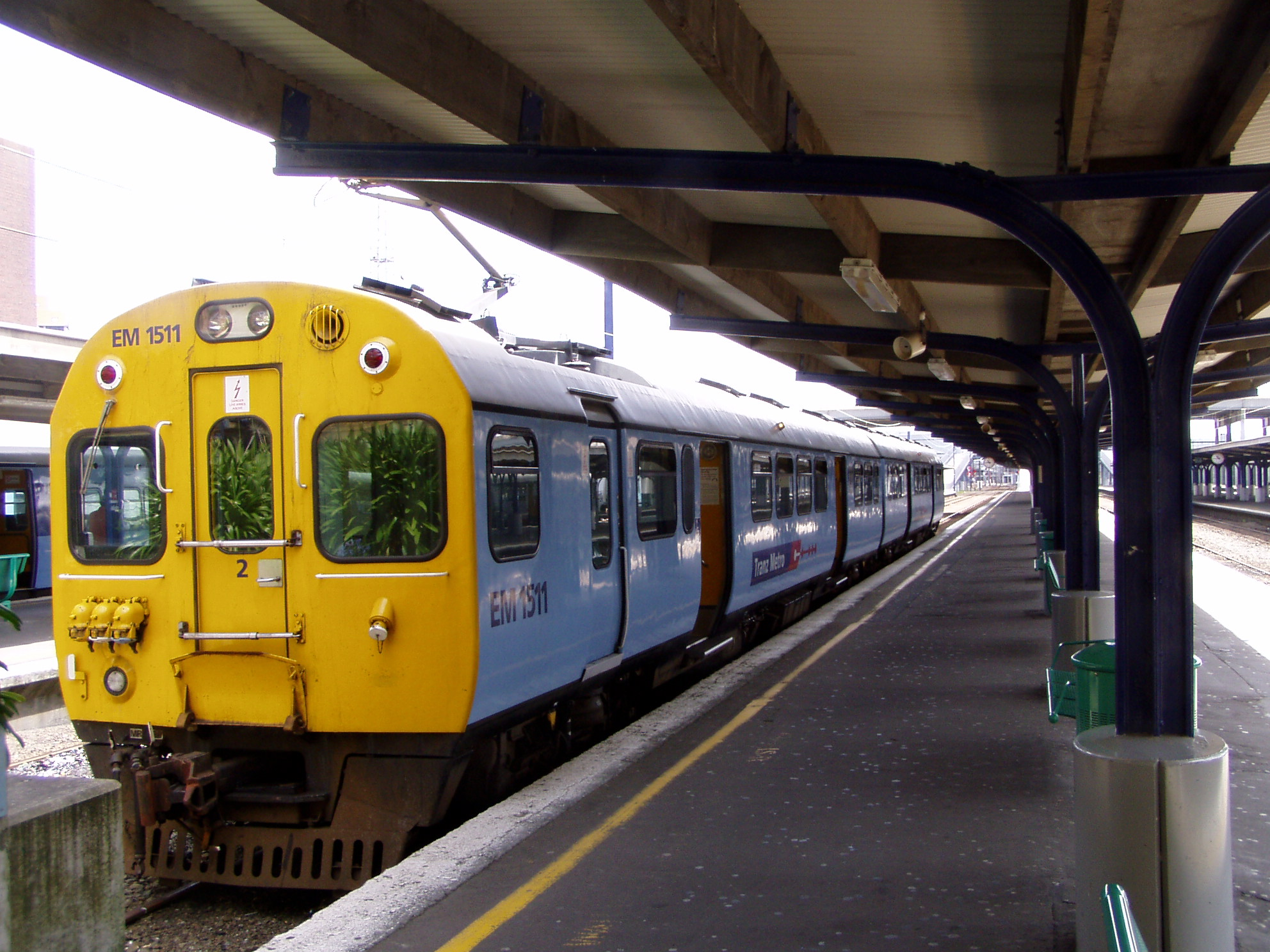
Refurbished EM1511 at Wellington station in 2006 in Tranz Rail "Cato Blue" livery. Note the upgraded single-arm pantograph

In October 1995 a major refurbishment programme of the class began, with the EMUs repainted in the then standard Tranz Rail Cato light blue and yellow livery with new seats and brighter interiors. This refurbishment programme was completed by 2002.

Other minor upgrades were made in the mid-2000s, replacing the original diamond pantographs with single-arm ones and adding ditch lights.

In 2008 a proposed refurbishment was deferred until the new Matangi units were available. The projected expenditure was $23.3 million in 2008 - 2009. The prototype refurbished unit was completed at the end of 2010.

EM 1373 and ET 3373 were fully refurbished to ascertain unit costs and gauge public opinion, including repainting into the new Metlink livery. A decision to refurbish others in the fleet was made on 10 March 2011 as part of an $88 million rail upgrade package, instead of purchasing more Matangi. In August 2012 GWRC announced its preference for ordering 35 more Matangi units instead of refurbishing the remaining units.

== Disposal ==
The introduction of the Matangi units allowed for the withdrawal of several EM units, with those in the best mechanical condition retained for running peak services only. Those units that were withdrawn were stored initially at Thorndon before most were relocated to the Hutt Workshops. GWRC called for expressions of interest in the disposal of these units.

The EM fleet operated their last revenue services on 27 May 2016, operating the 14:17 Wellington to Melling service and the return 14:39 Melling to Wellington service. This paralleled the last revenue service by the DM/D "English Electric" units four years earlier.

In June 2013, GWRC announced that it had come to terms for both the purchase of an additional 35 Matangi units and the sale of 42 of the Ganz units to a South African buyer, with one unit to be retained in New Zealand for preservation.

Seventeen units were shipped to South Africa in February 2014 aboard the MV Pangani where they will be converted into (unpowered) carriages for operation in Tanzania and Zimbabwe. The remaining units were to be shipped once replaced by the second tranche of Matangi units from mid-2015. In November 2015, and in January and February 2016 several more units were withdrawn from service. In March 2017, many were still held in the Wellington rail yards.

The agreement to sell the remaining units fell through later in 2017 and in May 2018 the remaining 26 units started being transported to Wellington's Southern Landfill where they will be scrapped. The carriages were crushed and buried due to the use of asbestos in the train wall's anti-drum coatings.

EM 1373/ET 3373 was donated to the Canterbury Railway Society in Christchurch in 2016, while EM 1505/ET 3505 was purchased for $1 by the Wellington Heritage Multiple Unit Preservation Trust.
