= Western Hutt railway station =

Railway station in New Zealand

Western Hutt
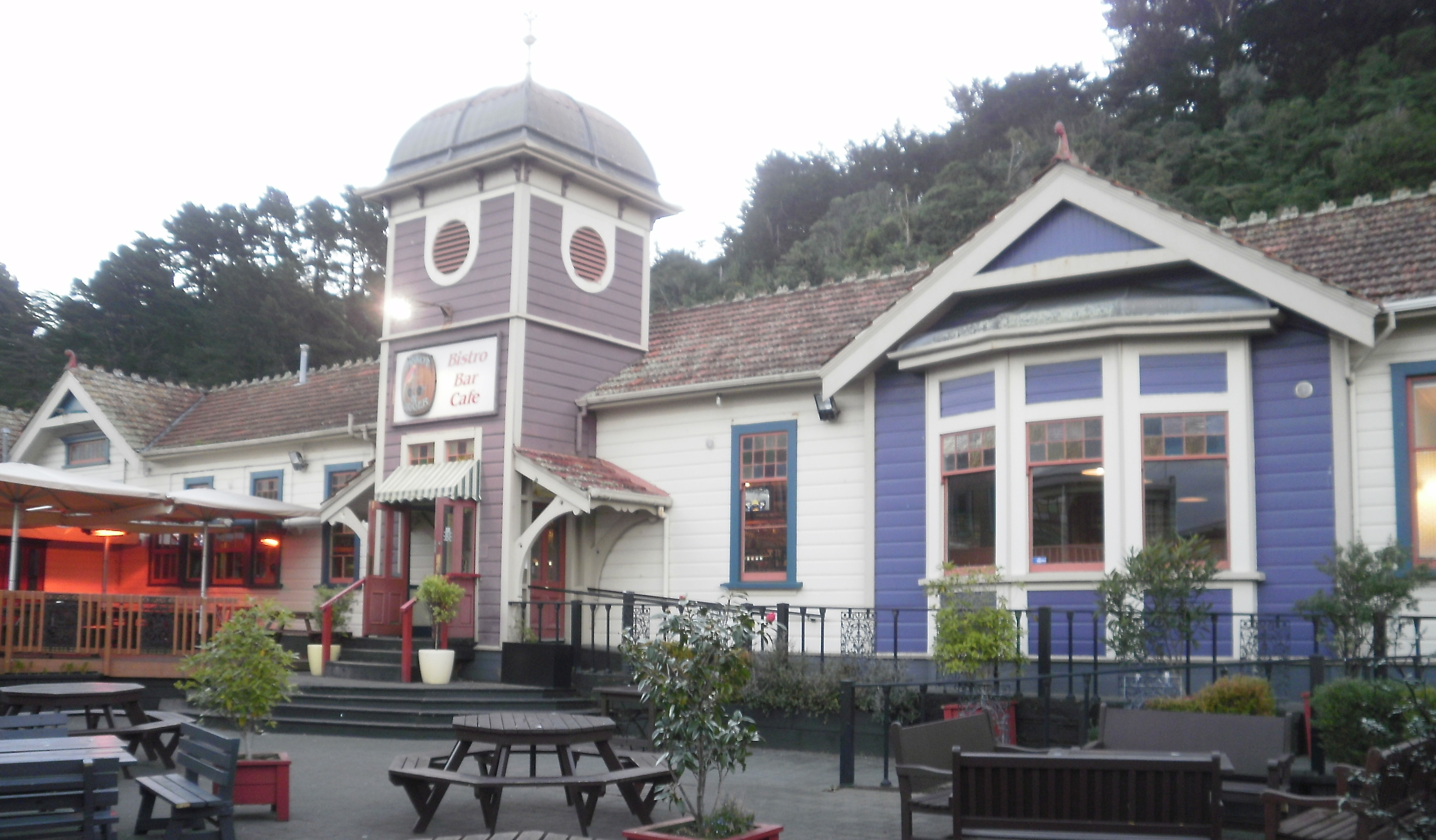

General information
- Location: Hutt Road, Alicetown, Lower Hutt, New Zealand
- Coordinates: 41°12′43.22″S 174°53′23.48″E
- System: Metlink suburban rail
- Owner: Building is privately owned as a pub, platform owned by KiwiRail
- Line: Melling Branch
- Platforms: Island (formerly)
- Tracks: 1

Construction
- Platform levels: 1

Other information
- Fare zone: 4
- Classification: RHTNZ Category B building

History
- Opened: 14 April 1874
- Rebuilt: 1892, 1906
- Electrified: 1 March 1954
- Former names: Lower Hutt

Services
Preceding station	Transdev Wellington	Following station
Melling Terminus	Melling Line	Petone towards Wellington

Heritage New Zealand – Category 1
- Designated: 25-Sep-1986
- Reference no.: 1327
Location

Western Hutt railway station, formerly Lower Hutt (the official NZ Geographic Board name is still Lower Hutt), is an intermediate station on the single-track Melling Line in Lower Hutt, New Zealand, It is served by Metlink electric multiple unit trains operated by Transdev Wellington under the Metlink brand.

For up to 18 months the station will be the terminus for Melling Line trains, until the relocation of the Melling railway station is completed as part of the RiverLink Project.

== History ==
The station used to be on the Hutt Valley Line section of the Wairarapa Line until 1 March 1954, when the Melling-Belmont section of the line on the western side of the Hutt Valley was closed and the through line to Upper Hutt and the Wairarapa rerouted through the centre of the valley. The truncated line to Melling via the Western Hutt Station was then electrified.

In the 19th century, the line from Wellington to the Hutt and the Lower Hutt Station were opened on 14 April 1874.

A new station building was erected in 1892, containing a ladies as well as a general waiting room.

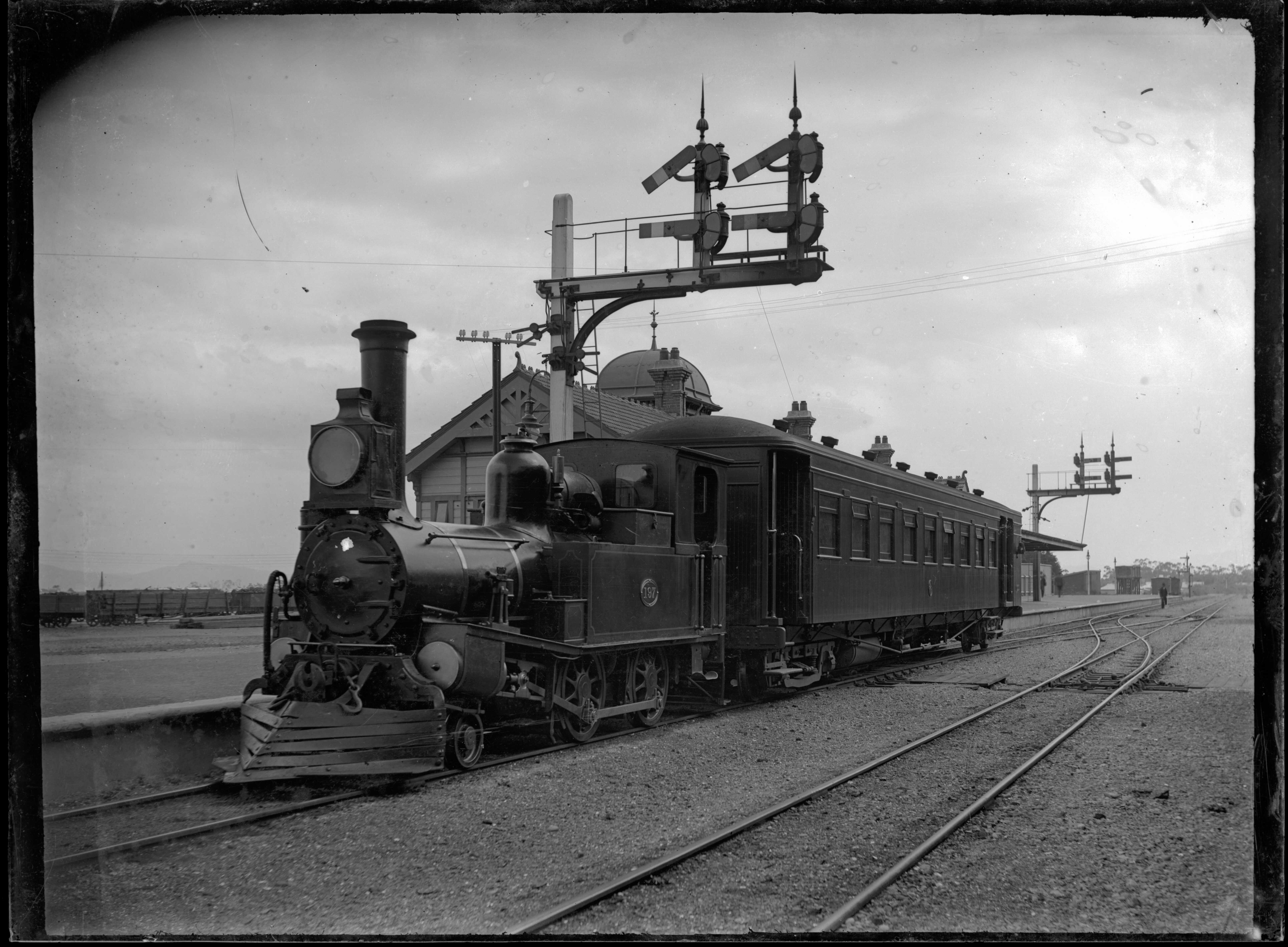
D Class no 197 at Lower Hutt, 1906 with a motor train

A large new Lower Hutt Station building designed by George Troup was opened in 1906. The line from Lower Hutt to Petone was double tracked in 1905, although not completed to Wellington until 1911. The second (double) track from Lower Hutt to the Hutt Valley Junction was removed by 1958. Hoy remarked in 1968 that "the platform is still one of the longest in the district and a two-coach Melling train is lost in the middle".

At one time the station had an "infamous" manure siding, to which loads of horse manure from Wellington streets were railed in a special "manure train". The station was still an important goods facility after 1954, but in 1981 the Melling Branch lost the last of its freight traffic when the goods facilities at Lower Hutt station were closed and the local goods shunts to Lower Hutt ceased. Goods handling was transferred to a new facility at Gracefield.

Lower Hutt station was renamed Western Hutt railway station following the opening of the Waterloo interchange on 26 November 1988.

The building is now leased to various shops and businesses, and is called The Station Village Complex .

== Services ==
The following Metlink bus routes serve Western Hutt station:

Previous Stop	Metlink Bus Services	Next Stop
Hutt Road towards Petone	150; Western Hills	Railway Avenue towards Kelson
