= Hukanui railway station =

Defunct railway station in New Zealand

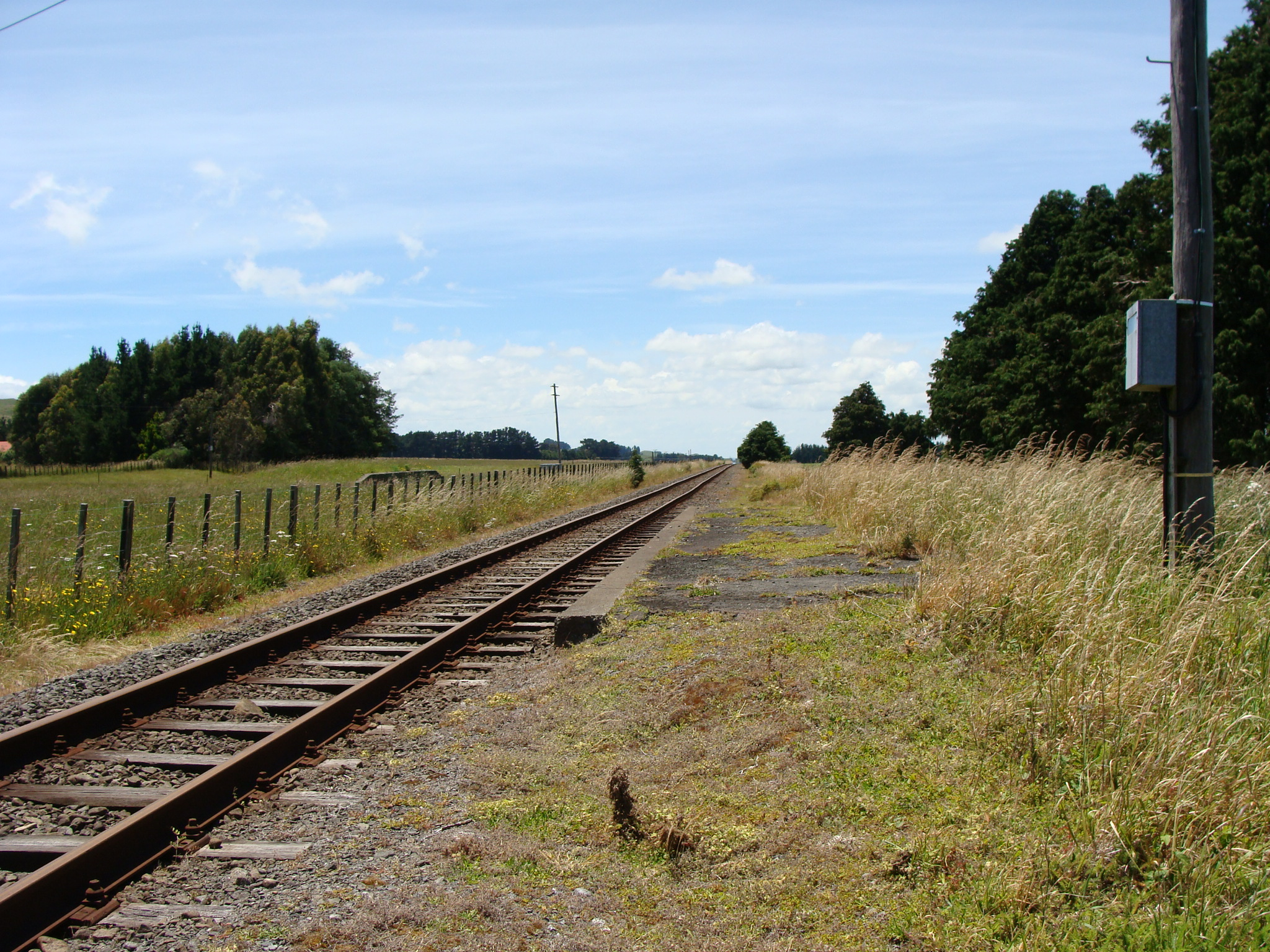
- Hukanui in 2008, looking north. Seen here are the loading bank (left, behind the fence) and platform (centre).

General information
- Location: Hamua Hukanui Road; Eketāhuna 4995; New Zealand
- Coordinates: 40.566972°S 175.694450°E
- Elevation: 195 m (640 ft)
- Line: Wairarapa Line
- Distance: 137.28 kilometres (85.30 mi) from Wellington
- Platforms: Single side

Construction
- Structure type: at-grade
- Parking: No

History
- Opened: 9 October 1896
- Closed: 1 August 1988
Location
Notes
- Previous Station: Newman Station; Next Station: Mangamaire Station

The Hukanui railway station on the Wairarapa Line was located in the Tararua District of the Manawatū-Whanganui region in New Zealand’s North Island.

The station served the settlement of Hukanui, which was established in 1894, and was briefly called Brownston. The New Zealand Ministry for Culture and Heritage gives a translation of "heavy snow" for Hukanui.

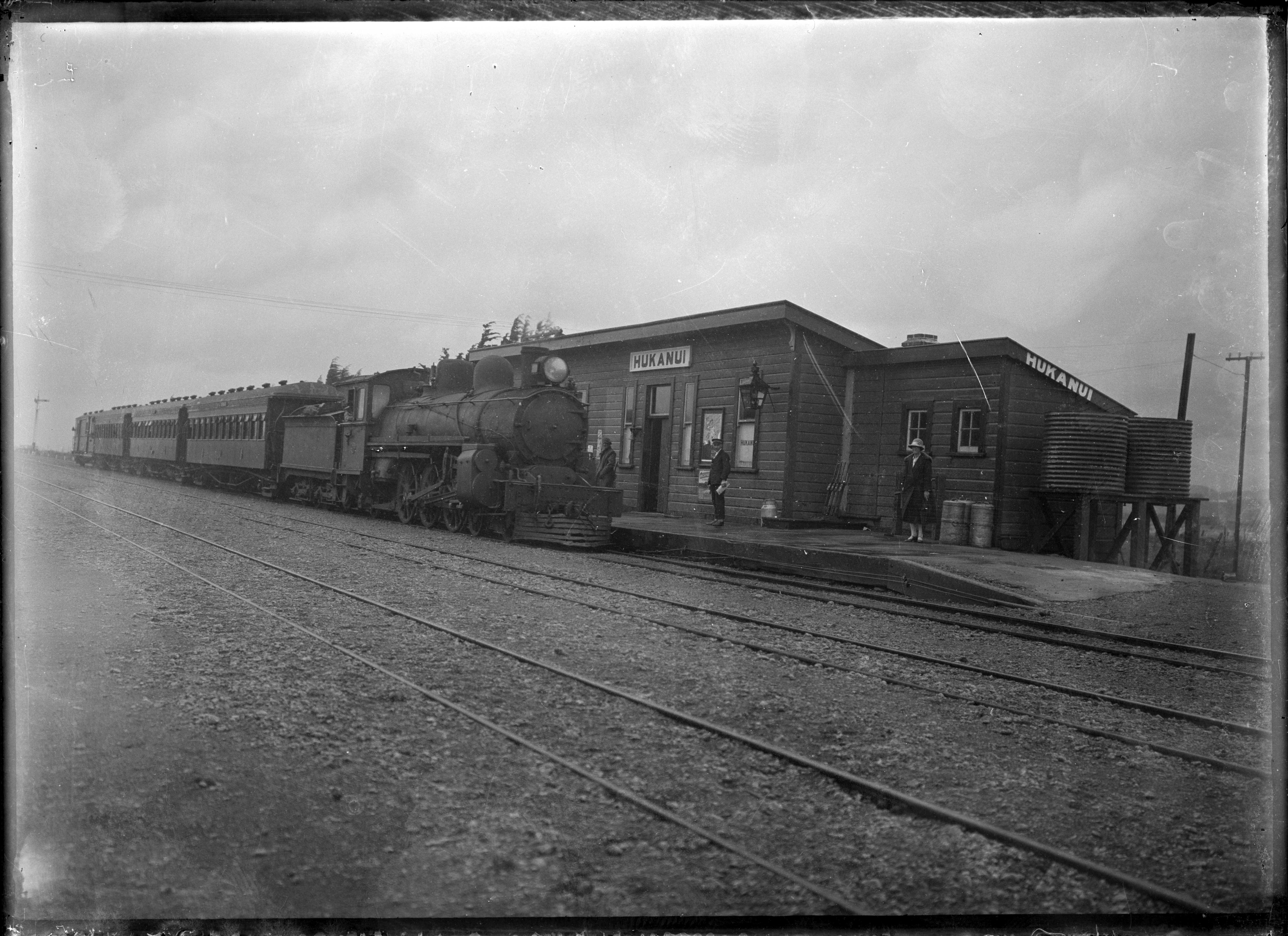
View of Hukanui Railway Station and a passenger train with steam locomotive at the station. Taken by Albert Percy Godber circa 1917.

The station opened on 9 October 1896 and closed on 1 August 1988.

The 162-metre (531 ft) bridge across Mangatainoka River, to the south of Hukanui, is the longest on the line.
