= Melling railway station =

Railway station in New Zealand

Melling
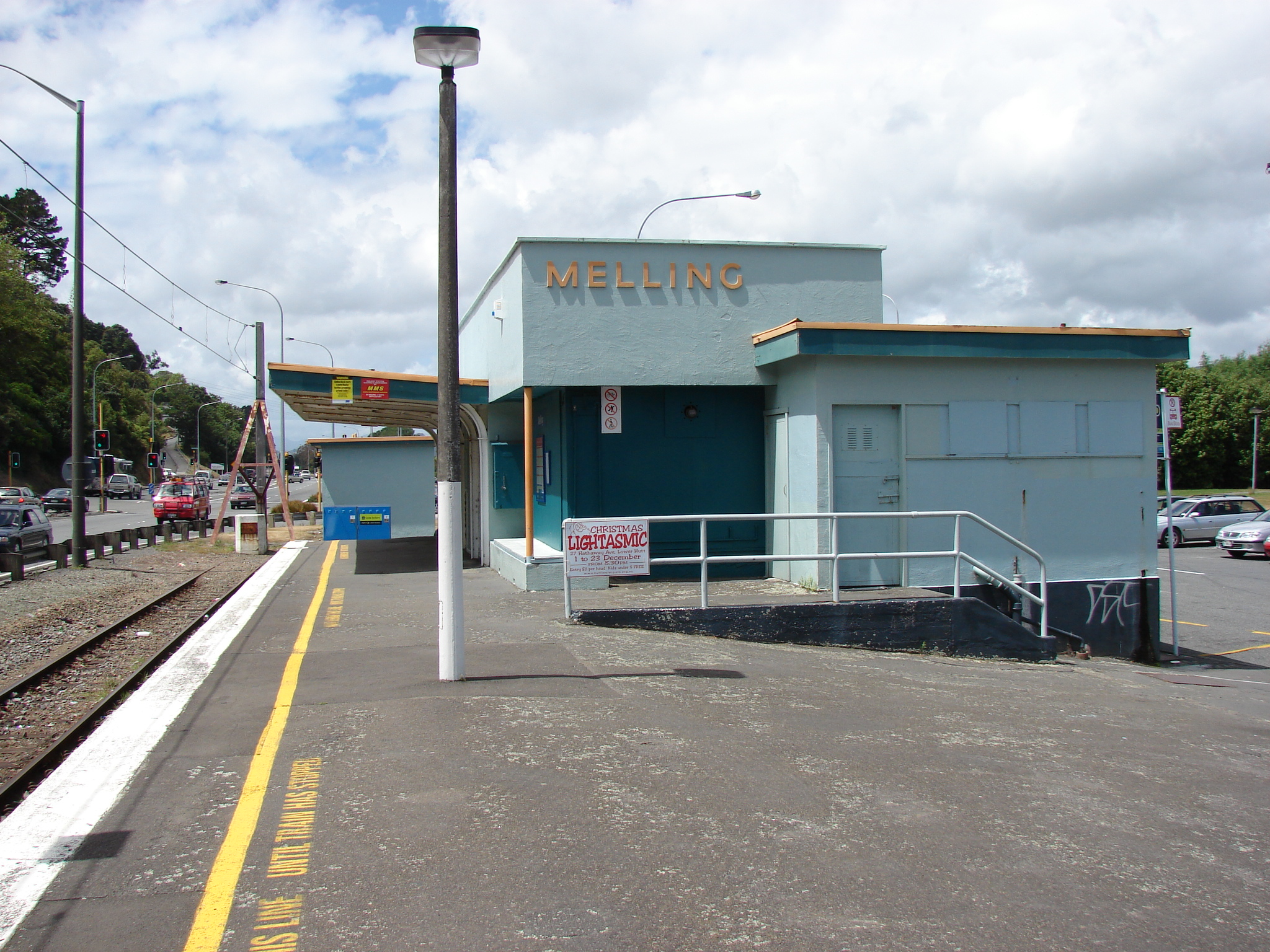

General information
- Location: Pharazyn Street, Melling, Lower Hutt, New Zealand
- Coordinates: 41°12′13.12″S 174°54′18.94″E
- System: Metlink suburban rail, Habourview, Tirohanga, and the northern end of the Lower Hutt CBD.
- Owner: Greater Wellington Regional Council
- Line: Melling Branch
- Platforms: Island
- Tracks: 1
- Connections: Bus services

Construction
- Parking: Yes

Other information
- Fare zone: 4

History
- Opened: 26 May 1908
- Rebuilt: 1 March 1954
- Electrified: 1 March 1954
- Former names: Melling Settlement

Services
Preceding station	Transdev Wellington	Following station
Terminus	Melling Line	Western Hutt towards Wellington
Location

Melling railway station is the terminal station on the single track Melling Line in Lower Hutt, New Zealand. The single platform station serves the suburb of Melling. The station is served by Metlink's electric multiple unit trains.

The station will close for three years from December 2025 to late 2028 to enable the RiverLink flood protection project to proceed. Melling Line services will instead terminate at Western Hutt railway station, and bus services that serve the station will be rerouted. A new Melling station is to be built 250m south of the existing station, which will be preserved as a heritage building. In January 2026 the rail tracks between the Melling and Western Hutt railway stations were removed.

== History ==
The station used to be on the Hutt Valley Line section of the Wairarapa Line until 1 March 1954, when the Melling-Belmont section of the line on the western side of the Hutt Valley was closed and the through line to Upper Hutt and the Wairarapa rerouted through the centre of the valley. The truncated line to Melling was then electrified. The new station erected at the same time was about 100m closer to Wellington to avoid a level crossing at the Melling Link Road over the Hutt River.

In the 19th century, the line from Wellington to the Hutt was opened on 14 April 1874. The line past Melling to Silverstream was opened in December 1875.

The original Melling station opened on 26 May 1908. Melling was one of several stations and sidings opened in 1908 on the Hutt Valley section of line, along with Gosse and Co's Siding, Pitcaithly's railway station, the Belmont Quarry Co's Siding (not to be confused with the Belmont railway station), and the Silverstream Bridge railway station.

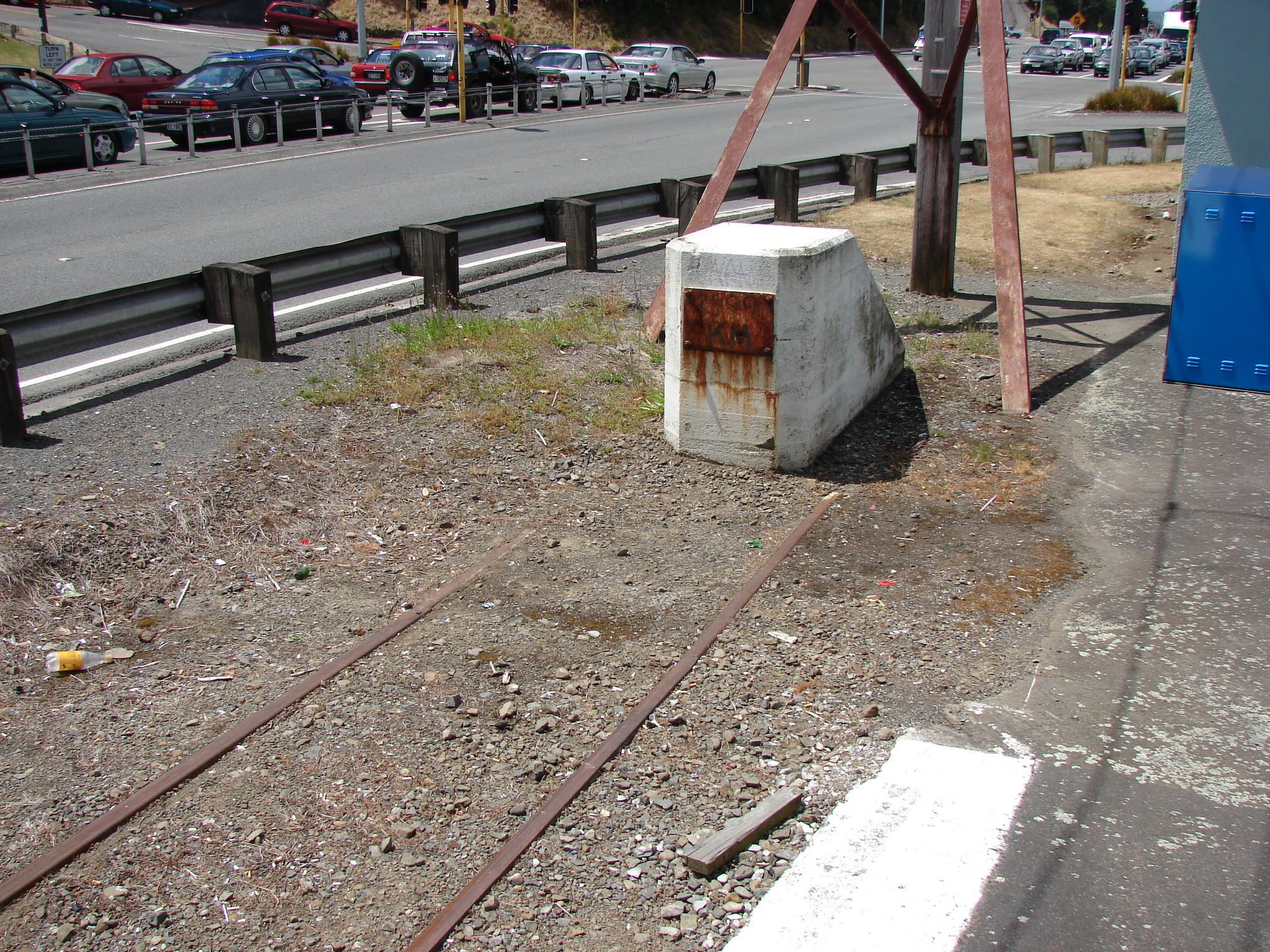
End of the line

Up to December 2025, the station building contained a ticket office and a coffee shop. In 2025 photos also show a new steel and glass passenger shelter on the Western Hutt side of the main station building.

The building was closed without notice on 18 December 2013 for asbestos removal, reopening on 18 February 2014.

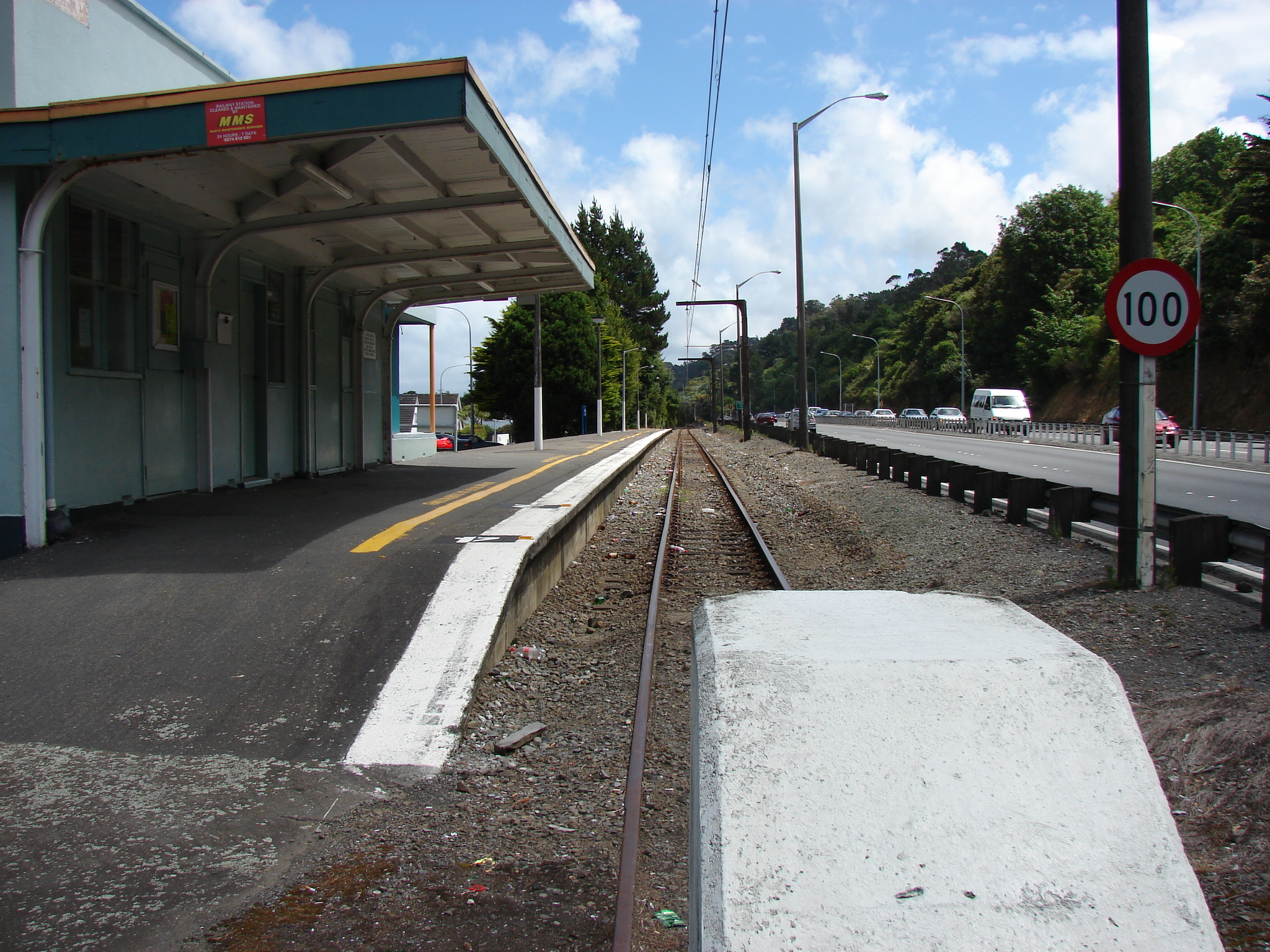
Melling Station, 2007

=== Future ===
The Melling Station will be moved under the three 2018 NZTA options for replacing the Melling road bridge. The proposed Melling Interchange also involves flood protection work by the Greater Wellington Regional Council, and will be completed by 2026 as part of the RiverLink Project. (in 2019 the project had been put "on hold").

=== Incidents ===
Since the introduction of the Matangi EMUs in 2010, two have crashed into the stop block at the north end of the platform. In the first incident, on 15 April 2013, nine passengers and 2 crew were aboard the 7:50 am train that hit the stop block in a low-speed collision. No serious injuries were reported and the line reopened the same day.

A year later on 27 May 2014 the 8:09 am train crashed into and mounted the stop block. Ten passengers were aboard, with one receiving minor injuries and another hospitalised for shock. Services resumed two days later.

== Services ==
The following Metlink bus routes serve Melling Station are Routes 145 and 149.

Route 145 to Belmont via Queensgate

Route 149 to Tirohanga via Queensgate

(During peak hour on weekdays you can catch either Route 145 or 149 from Melling Station to Waterloo Station.)
