= Belmont railway station, Wellington Region =

Defunct railway station in New Zealand

Coordinates: 41°11′27.74″S 174°55′39.91″E

Belmont

General information
- Location: Western Hutt Road, Lower Hutt. Just north of Owen Street
- System: New Zealand Government Railways (NZGR)
- Owner: Railways Department
- Line: Hutt Valley Line
- Platforms: Island
- Tracks: Main line (1)

History
- Opened: 15 December 1875
- Closed: 28 February 1954
Location

Belmont railway station was a station on the Hutt Valley Line section of the Wairarapa Line until 28 February 1954, when the Melling-Manor Park section of the line on the western side of the Hutt Valley, New Zealand, was closed and the through line to Upper Hutt and the Wairarapa rerouted through the centre of the valley.

The station was opened on 15 December 1875, along with the Haywards railway station (now called Manor Park Railway Station). It was 10.22 miles from Wellington, and 54 feet in altitude. It served the suburb of Belmont, then a rural area. The station initially catered for freight, but after a few months this was discontinued except for that which could be taken in passenger brake vans.
