= Kaitoke railway station =

Defunct railway station in New Zealand

Kaitoke
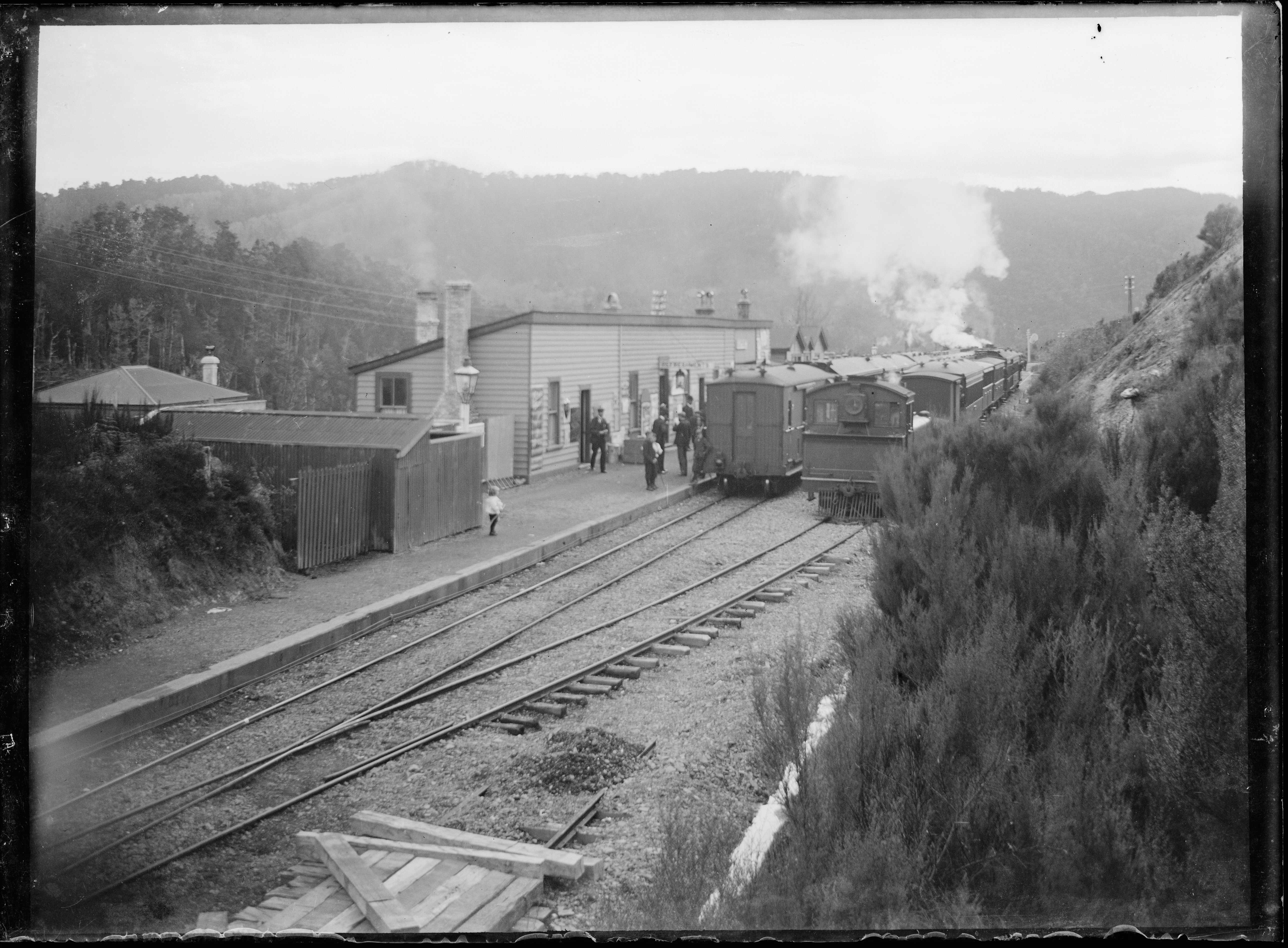
- Trains crossing at Kaitoke Station. Class Wb locomotives, 1901

General information
- Location: Station Drive, Kaitoke
- Coordinates: 41°5′4.22″S 175°10′5.02″E
- System: Formerly New Zealand Government Railways (NZGR)
- Owner: Formerly Railways Department; Now in private ownership
- Line: Formerly part of Wairarapa Line
- Platforms: Single
- Tracks: 1 main line, 1 crossing loop

History
- Opened: 28 December 1877
- Closed: 30 October 1955
- Former names: Pakuratahi; Kaitoki
Location
Notes
- Previous Station: Mangaroa Station; Next Station: Summit Station

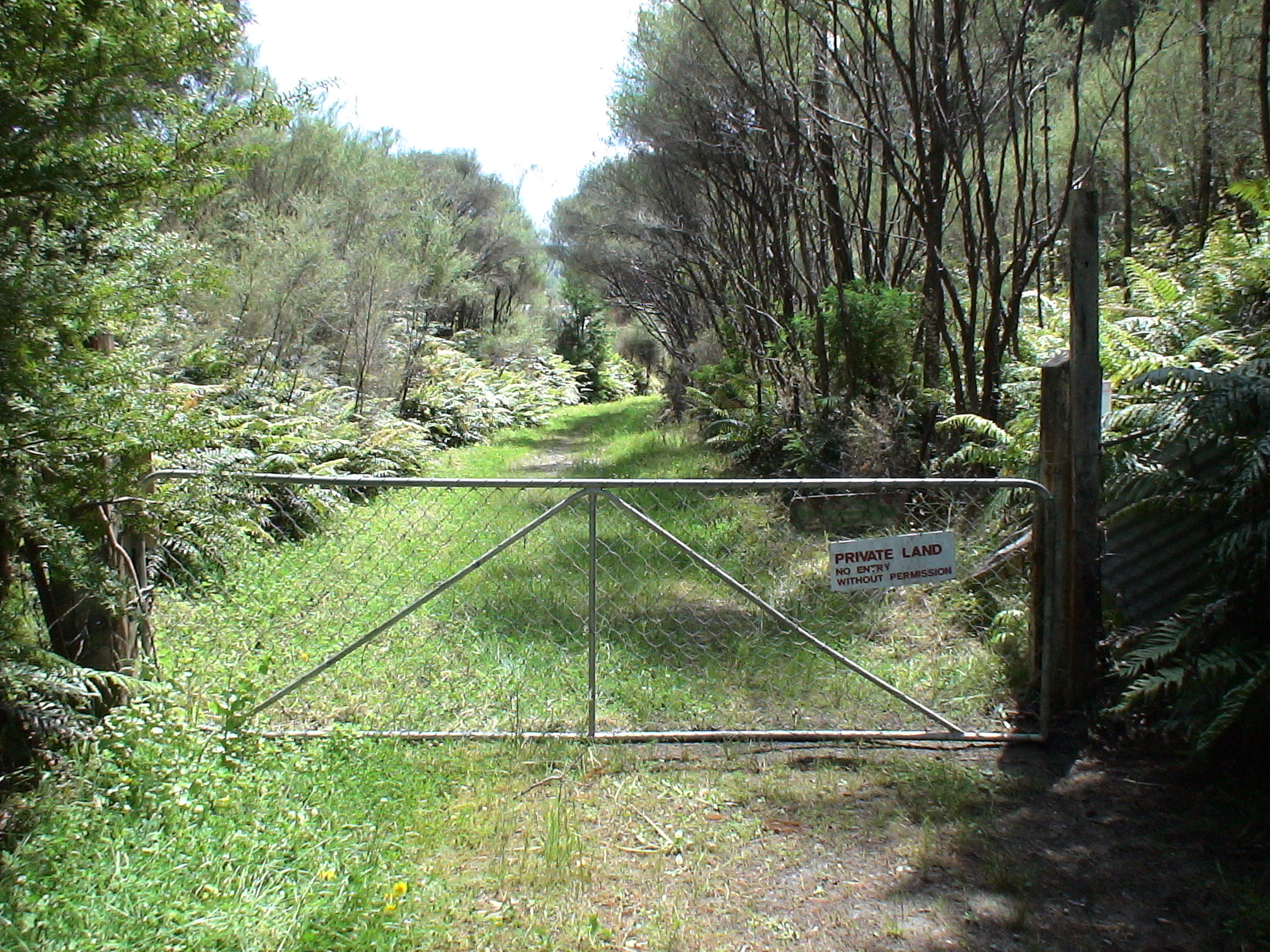
The gate on the southern approach to Kaitoke station that marks the end of public access and the boundary of private property that includes the former Kaitoke station yard.

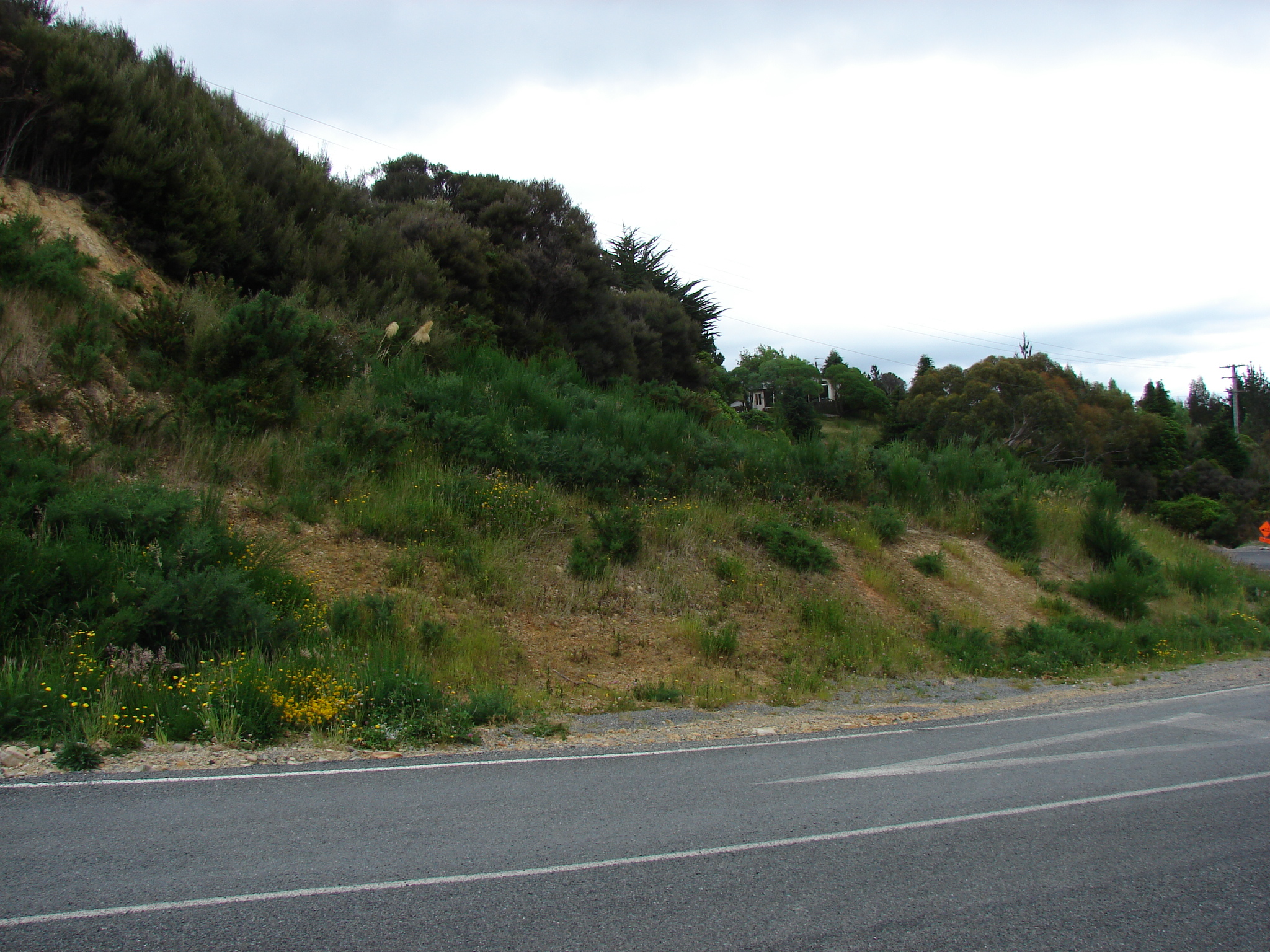
Kaitoke station northern approach. The access road that connects with the Rimutaka Rail Trail (bottom) cuts through the original northern approach formation. Also visible is one of the houses erected on the Kaitoke station yard area.

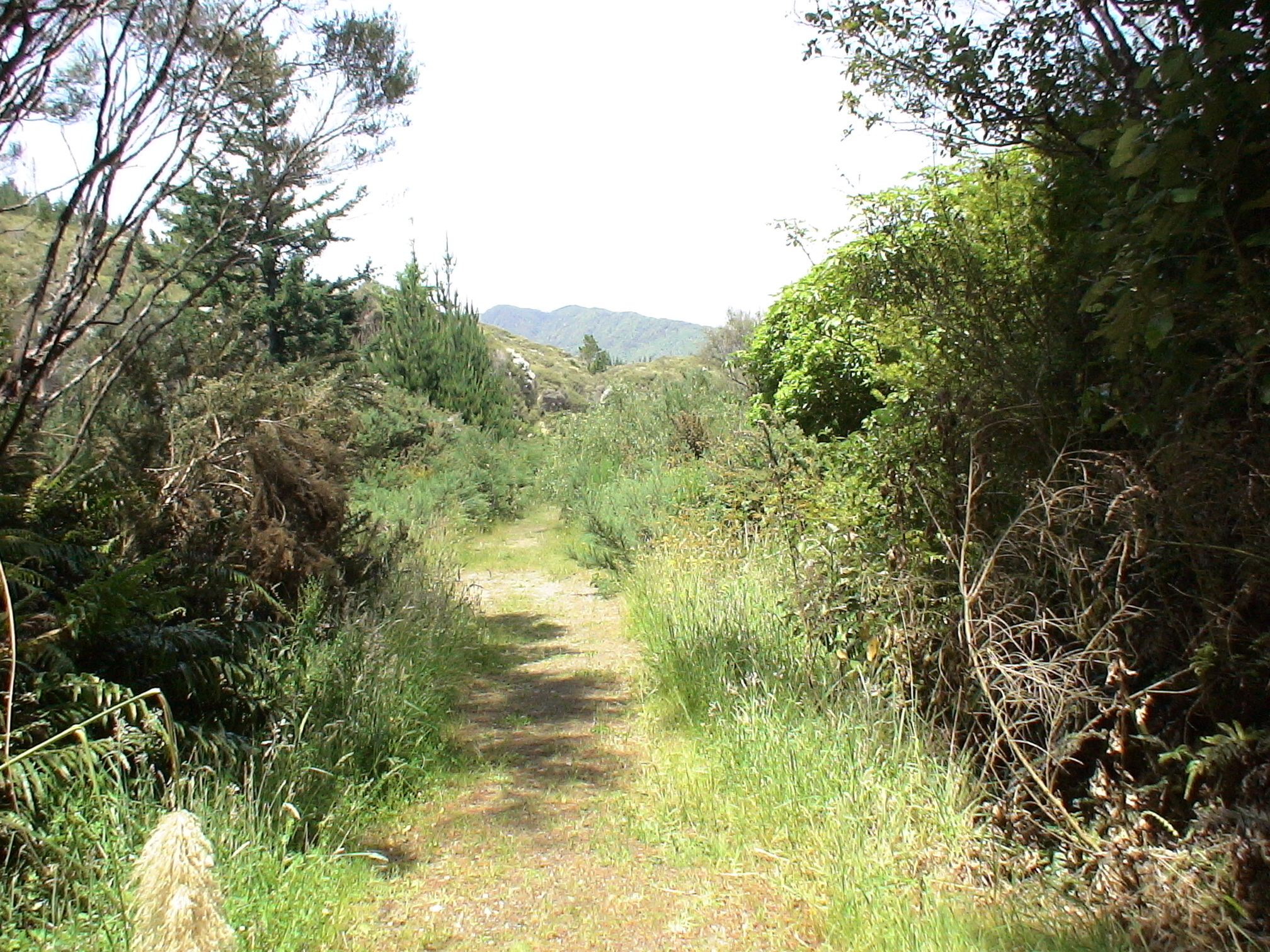
The last 240 metres of the southern approach to Kaitoke station with public access is disused and overgrown.

Kaitoke railway station was a single-platform rural railway station on the Wairarapa Line between Upper Hutt and Featherston in the Wellington region of New Zealand's North Island. Initially it was the railhead of the Wairarapa Line, at a point where the railway met the main road between Upper Hutt and the Wairarapa. Later it was a point at which locomotives were changed, steam engines were watered, trains could cross, and passengers could make use of the refreshment room.

The station was closed along with the old route via the Rimutaka Incline on which the Fell system was used over the Rimutaka Ranges when the Rimutaka Deviation opened in 1955.

== History ==
The Mungaroa Contract for the construction of the Wairarapa Line between Upper Hutt and the Pakuratahi Valley included a station near the terminus of the contract, originally called Pakuratahi Station. The contractor for this section was Charles McKirdy, who was to have completed the contract between 3 June 1874 and 3 March 1876 but, as was common with contracts for the construction of the Wairarapa Line, work was not completed on time. Having run out of money with two months of work left to complete, the contract was picked up by McKirdy's guarantors, Walter Turnbull and John McKenzie. They applied for and received further funds to continue the work, which was completed on 16 December 1877.

When work was nearing completion, the Government called for tenders to erect a fourth-class station building and stationmaster's house. The contract was let to W. H. Ridler for the sum of £1,778. This contract also possibly included the erection of the goods shed on a siding 12 chains (240 metres) to the north of the station (the goods shed was demolished in 1882). A separate contract for the sum of £1,514 was let to Messrs. Fraser and Lyon for the construction of an access road to the station and the levelling of the site for the station and house.

By early December 1877, the Public Works Department had advanced platelaying as far as Pakuratahi Station, by this time renamed Kaitoki, later (probably in the 1880s) to become Kaitoke. As Kaitoke was expected to be the railhead for two years, there was some consternation over the siting of the station, with complaints particularly from the Wairarapa that the site was unsuitable for the trans-shipment of goods between road and rail. The Government stood firm and the station stayed where it was intended to be.

The line to Kaitoke Station was officially opened on 28 December 1877 by the Governor, the Marquis of Normanby. A special train was run from Wellington to Kaitoke for the occasion under the supervision of District Engineer Mr. Hales and General Manager Mr. Stone. After speeches and an inspection of the station, by which time had had a refreshments room added, the Governor and party boarded the train again to return to Wellington. Over the next few days, excursion trains were run from Wellington to Kaitoke to satiate the curiosity of those who had heard of the fearsome reputation the line had gained during its construction.On 1 January 1878 the line to Kaitoke was opened to the public, becoming the railhead for the Wairarapa for nearly ten months.

Kaitoke Station proceeded to enter the busiest phase of its existence as the railhead of the Wairarapa Line, which lasted only until the opening of the line as far as Featherston on 16 October 1878, after which it was of minor significance. Initially, two daily mixed trains were timed to connect with road coaches from the Wairarapa. There was a limited amount of flat land available, so the station retained its original configuration of the main line plus one crossing loop throughout its life. There was also a locomotive siding to the south of the station until the practice of changing locomotives ceased, at which time the siding was lifted.

The refreshment rooms were extended in 1896, and, except for the addition of the signal box in 1902, the station buildings remained the same until the refreshment rooms were closed about 1952.

In 1883 the station handled 759 outbound passengers, a level of patronage that remained steady for many years. Traffic increased steadily right from the start, with average goods tonnage at around the same time of 457 tons inward and 1,978 outward. The growth in business led to the introduction of a third mixed train a month after the station opened.

The Working Timetable of 1887 lists Kaitoke as one of the first stations on the section to receive signals. Instructions for crossing trains required down (southbound) trains to take the siding or loop and up (northbound) trains to take the main line.

Soon after the installation of the first full mechanical interlocking system at Lambton Station in Wellington, a smaller system was installed at Kaitoke. A signal box was built at the south end of the platform, and two arm bracket signals for both "home" and "starting" were provided for trains travelling in both directions. Later, up and down "distant" signals were added. Balanced arm semaphore signals replaced the earlier slotted-post design.

With the completion of the Rimutaka Deviation, Kaitoke station was closed on 30 October 1955 along with the rest of the old line over the Rimutaka Ranges, followed by the opening of the new line on 3 November.

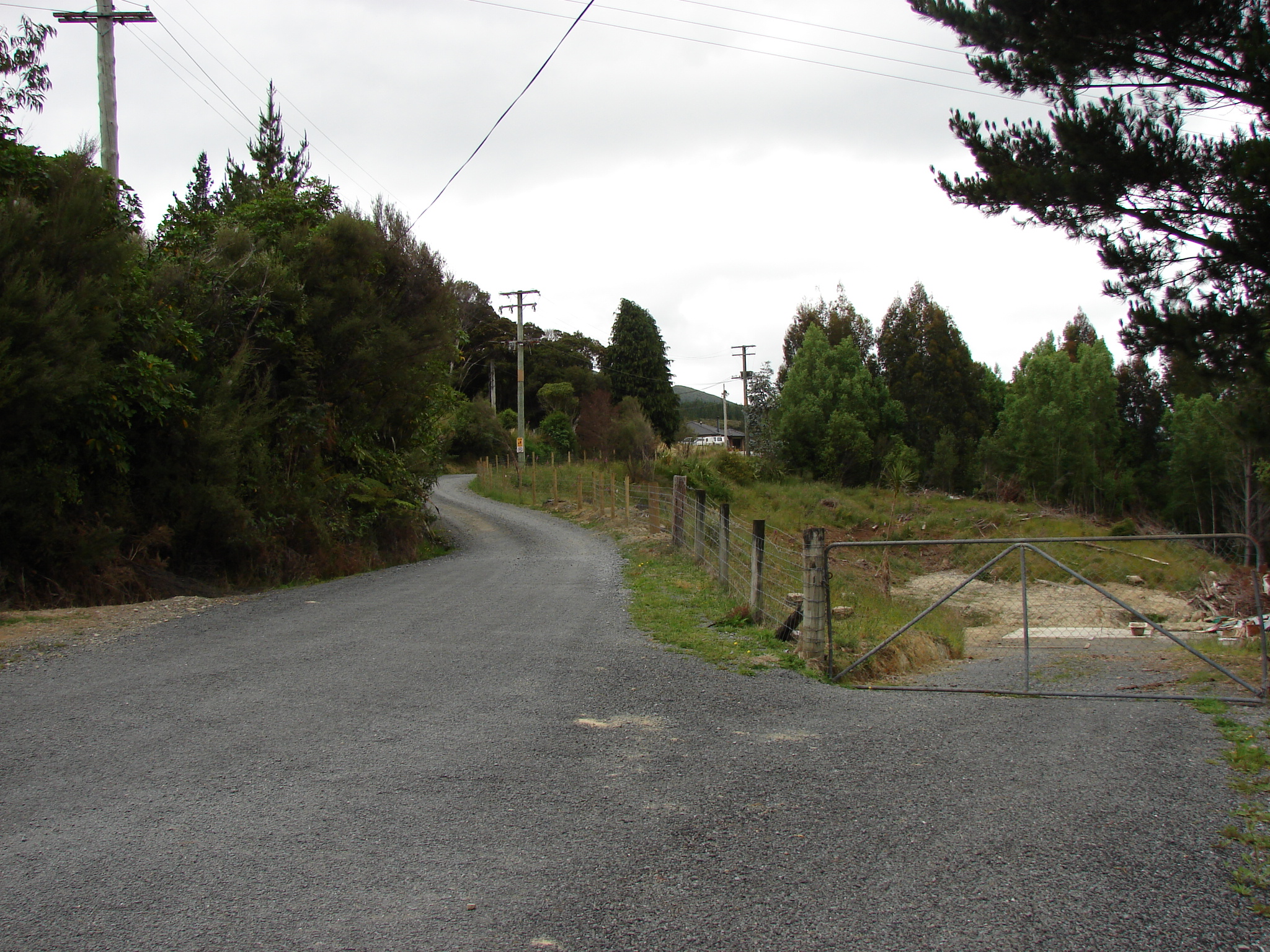
Station Drive, formerly an access road to Kaitoke Station, now providing access to several private dwellings on the former station site.

== Today ==
Station Drive, the access road to the former station off State Highway 2, still exists and provides access to several private dwellings that have been constructed on the terrace that was cut into the hillside to form the station yard. The terrace can easily be seen from the old State Highway where it intersects with the new State Highway, and there is public access up to the south end of the former station yard via the old railway line, a public walking/cycling track between Kaitoke and Mangaroa.

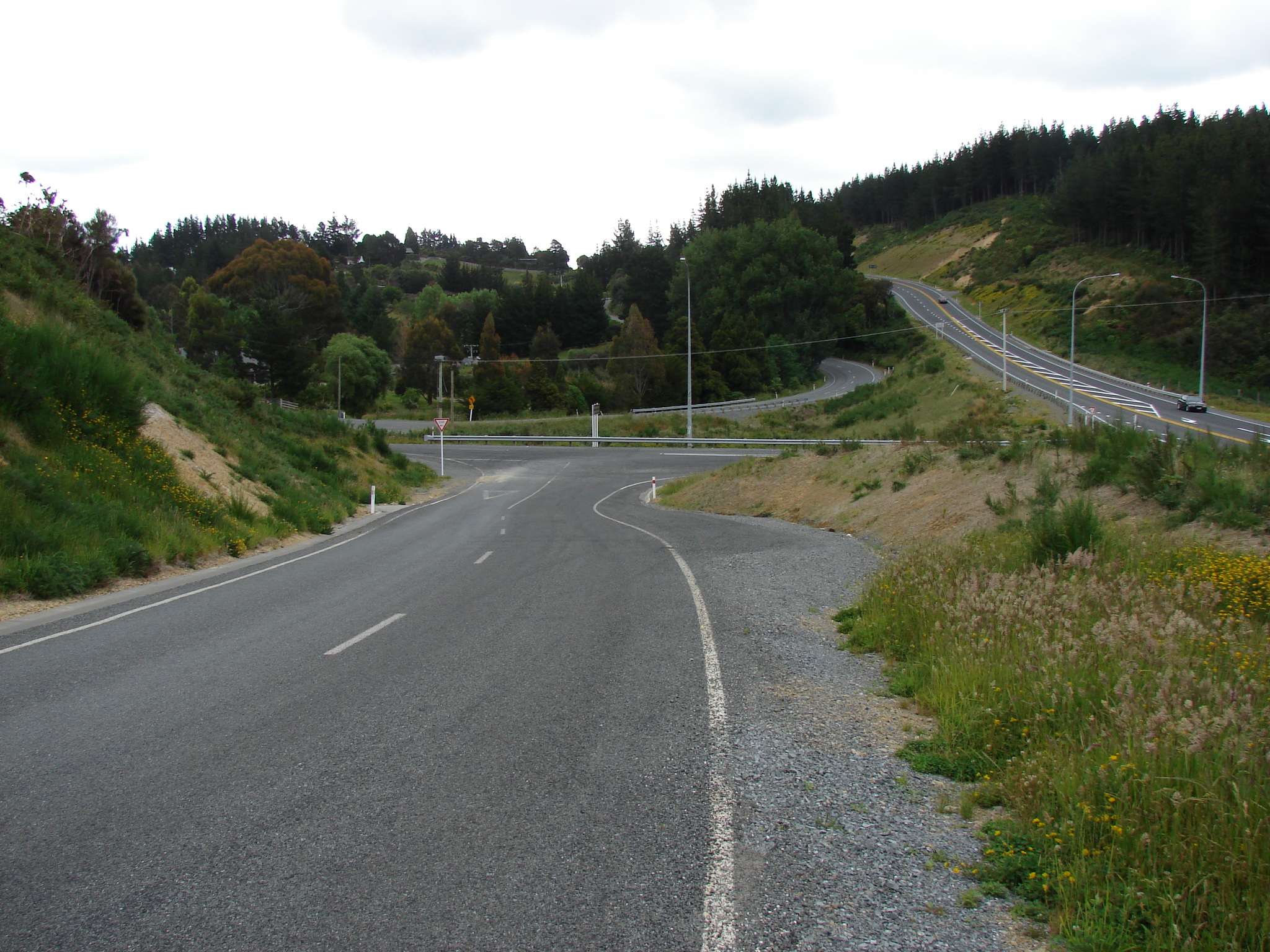
Kaitoke railway station northern approach area. The State Highway 2 realignment (far right) was redesigned to allow for the possible future reinstatement of the railway to the Rimutaka Incline. The old State Highway 2 is visible (far centre).

== Future ==
The 'Rimutaka Incline Railway', the project of the Rimutaka Incline Railway Heritage Trust, aims to re-establish a railway line on the former Wairarapa Line formation between Maymorn and Featherston. This includes new track past Kaitoke, utilising an easement created by Transit New Zealand when they built the State Highway 2 deviation through Kaitoke. The trust does not propose to acquire former railway formation now in private ownership at Kaitoke, or establish a new station at or near the original Kaitoke Station for its own operations.

== See also ==
- Cross Creek railway station
- Summit railway station, New Zealand
- Rimutaka Incline
- Rimutaka Tunnel
