= Cross Creek railway station =

Defunct railway station in New Zealand

Cross Creek
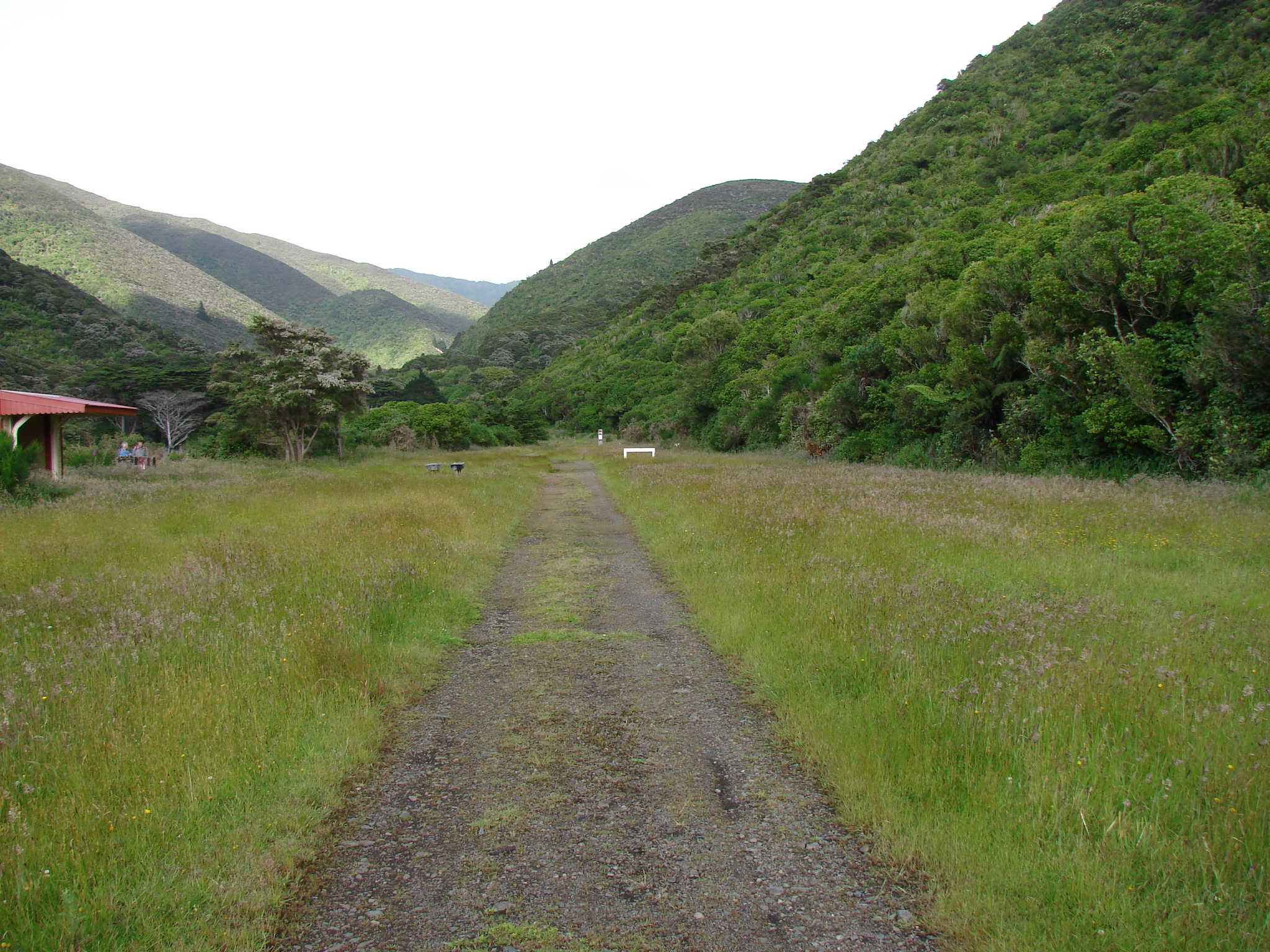
- Cross Creek station yard, looking west at the start of the incline.

General information
- Coordinates: 41°10′3.39″S 175°12′56.64″E
- System: Formerly New Zealand Government Railways
- Owner: Formerly Railways Department; Now Department of Conservation
- Line: Formerly part of Wairarapa Line
- Platforms: None
- Tracks: Main (1), crossing loops (2), sidings (6)

History
- Opened: 12 October 1878
- Closed: 30 October 1955
- Former names: Cross's Creek
Location
Notes
- Previous Station: Summit Station; Next Station: Pigeon Bush Station

Cross Creek railway station was the base of operations for the Rimutaka Incline, a Fell railway over the Rimutaka Ranges, and part of the original Wairarapa Line between Upper Hutt and Featherston in the Wellington region of New Zealand's North Island. The station was between Pigeon Bush and Summit stations on the Wairarapa Line. The station was bypassed when the Rimutaka Tunnel was opened.

This station existed solely for the operational requirements of the Incline. It did not consign goods, or serve any local settlements, save for the railway staff that were based there.

== History ==
Though the origin of the name Cross Creek has not always been clear, it is generally accepted based on the writings of surveyor John Rochfort that it was derived from a Mr. Lot Cross, who lived and farmed in the vicinity of the site that was later to become the station. In the early days of the railway, it was known as Cross's Creek, but was simplified to Cross Creek in the 1880s.

=== Construction ===
Construction of the station was included in the Incline Contract for the Rimutaka Incline, which was to cover formation works from south of the Summit Tunnel to Featherston. It was awarded to contractor Charles McKirdy for the sum of £49,029 on 5 October 1875.

The station started out with a simple yard layout that included; the safety siding, two loops with capacities of 20 and 26 wagons, and a two road engine shed at the south end. The insufficiency of this arrangement soon became apparent, and additional sidings were laid. Increasing use of the line prompted periodic additions of sidings to the yard as required, with the ultimate capacity being reached in 1915.

A coal storage shed was attached to the locomotive shed, which was extended in 1882 using materials from the dismantled Kaitoke goods shed. In 1889, the locomotive shed was extended, but by 1899 operational requirements meant that further storage space was required. With insufficient room to extend the locomotive shed on its existing site, a new four-road depot was constructed – with a fitter's workshop attached to the western side – at the north end of the yard. The Locomotive Foreman's office was built in 1914 on a bank above the engine shed. A coaling stage was provided alongside one of the roads to the engine shed, from which coal was shovelled into the Fell locomotives. A shelter and pit were installed on a nearby siding which was used for changing the brake blocks on the Fell brake vans.

The only amenities provided for passenger traffic through the station was a small shelter shed and an office for the traffic staff. There were quite a few houses, these generally being reserved for management or staff with families, especially after the construction in the early 1900s of a dormitory for single members of staff. The station also boasted a school and swimming pool to cater for the children living there.

=== Operations ===
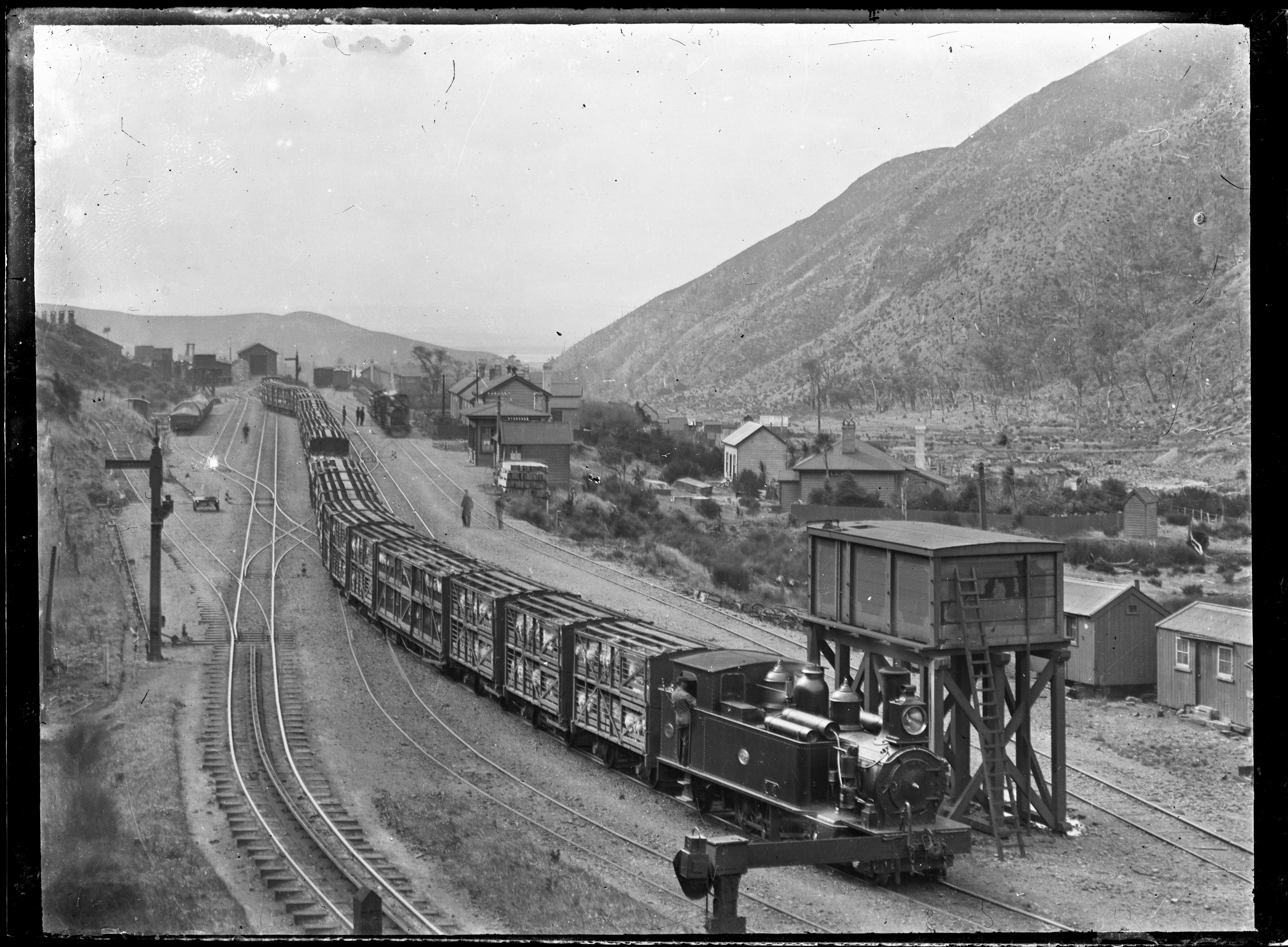
Cross Creek station railway yards, with long goods train carrying sheep and railway houses on the right of the railway track, 1910s

Cross Creek always had locomotives based there including, until 1880, the four Fell locomotives plus two others. After the closure of the locomotive shed at Featherston in 1891, all locomotives working the South Wairarapa district – except for the Greytown Branch – were based at Cross Creek. A new engine shed was constructed at Cross Creek in 1899. Because of the maintenance requirements of the Fell locomotives, and the distance of the station from the Petone Workshops, it was necessary to maintain a workshop on site and to have a fitter permanently based there. In 1902, the promotion of a fitter to the position of Assistant Locomotive Foreman for Cross Creek, subordinate to the Locomotive Foreman of Wellington, effectively meant that there were two fitters based at Cross Creek. A third fitter was appointed in 1911, and remained until a reduction in traffic over the line, probably after World War I. The workshops were attached to the side of the locomotive stables, and were capable of handling all but the heaviest of repair and maintenance jobs. Records show that it was normal practice for one of the six Fell locomotives to be away at Petone Workshops for medium to heavy repairs or maintenance at any given time.

Cross Creek was one of the first stations on the Wairarapa Line to receive signals, with the Working Timetable of 1887 being the first to list them. Instructions for the crossing of trains laid down that southbound trains were to take the siding or loop, and northbound trains were to take the main line. There were two safety sidings, each of which had a ground disc to indicate its position. A home signal was also installed at the foot of the incline, and a starting signal controlled trains leaving for Featherston at the other end of the yard. Though there was a building next to the station in which a lever frame was used to set some points using mechanical interlocking, this was never as extensive as at other stations.

Cross Creek had an unusual six-lever partially-interlocked signalling installation and had no "distant" signals so had points indicators which applied to the "main" line (see book for station layout), while Summit had a fully interlocked 27-lever frame.

An instruction issued in 1885 regarding the use of the safety siding at Cross Creek stated that the points from the Incline must always be set to the safety siding. When a descending train approached Cross Creek, the driver of the leading locomotive gave one long whistle to signal that the train was under control, whereupon the signalman set the points for the arrival road. If there was a problem, the driver had to sound three short whistle blasts in rapid succession, at frequent intervals. No such emergency is known to have occurred.

=== Demise ===
In considering alternatives for a railway between the Hutt Valley and the Wairarapa district to bypass the increasingly costly Rimutaka Incline, various proposals for a tunnel were considered that would have involved an eastern portal emerging at Cross Creek. Despite all the work done on investigating these ideas, the alignment eventually chosen was one that saw the tunnel emerging into the Wairarapa in a gully to the north. Once work commenced on the Rimutaka Tunnel, the fate of Cross Creek was sealed.

The last train through the station was the Wellington-bound Carterton Show Day excursion on Saturday, 29 October 1955. It carried most of the inhabitants of Cross Creek to a farewell party at Summit, after which they were returned home in a couple of carriages that had been delivered earlier in the day. The station was closed by the following day along with the rest of the line over the Remutaka Ranges. By March 1956 most of the track between Summit and Pigeon Bush had been lifted and the buildings were sold on site for removal.

== Today ==
Cross Creek became part of the Remutaka Rail Trail, which was established and is maintained by the New Zealand Department of Conservation, and was opened on 1 November 1987. Some remnants of the sites former usage remain, most notably the concrete foundations of the locomotive shed, the pit in which the brake blocks for the Fell brake vans were replaced, and the turntable pit. For the benefit of hikers the Conservation Department erected a shelter shed when preparing the site for the rail trail, and have since installed several plaques that point out and describe various features of the yard.

== Future ==
The Rimutaka Incline Railway Heritage Trust plans to reinstate and operate a heritage railway between Maymorn and Featherston on the original Wairarapa Line railway formation over the Remutaka Ranges. Stage 3 of the project involves construction and operation of the Incline section between Summit and Cross Creek using Fell locomotives and brake vans.

== See also ==
- Kaitoke railway station
- Summit railway station, New Zealand
- Rimutaka Incline
- Rimutaka Tunnel
- Rimutaka Incline Railway Heritage Trust
