= Maymorn =

- Rural locality
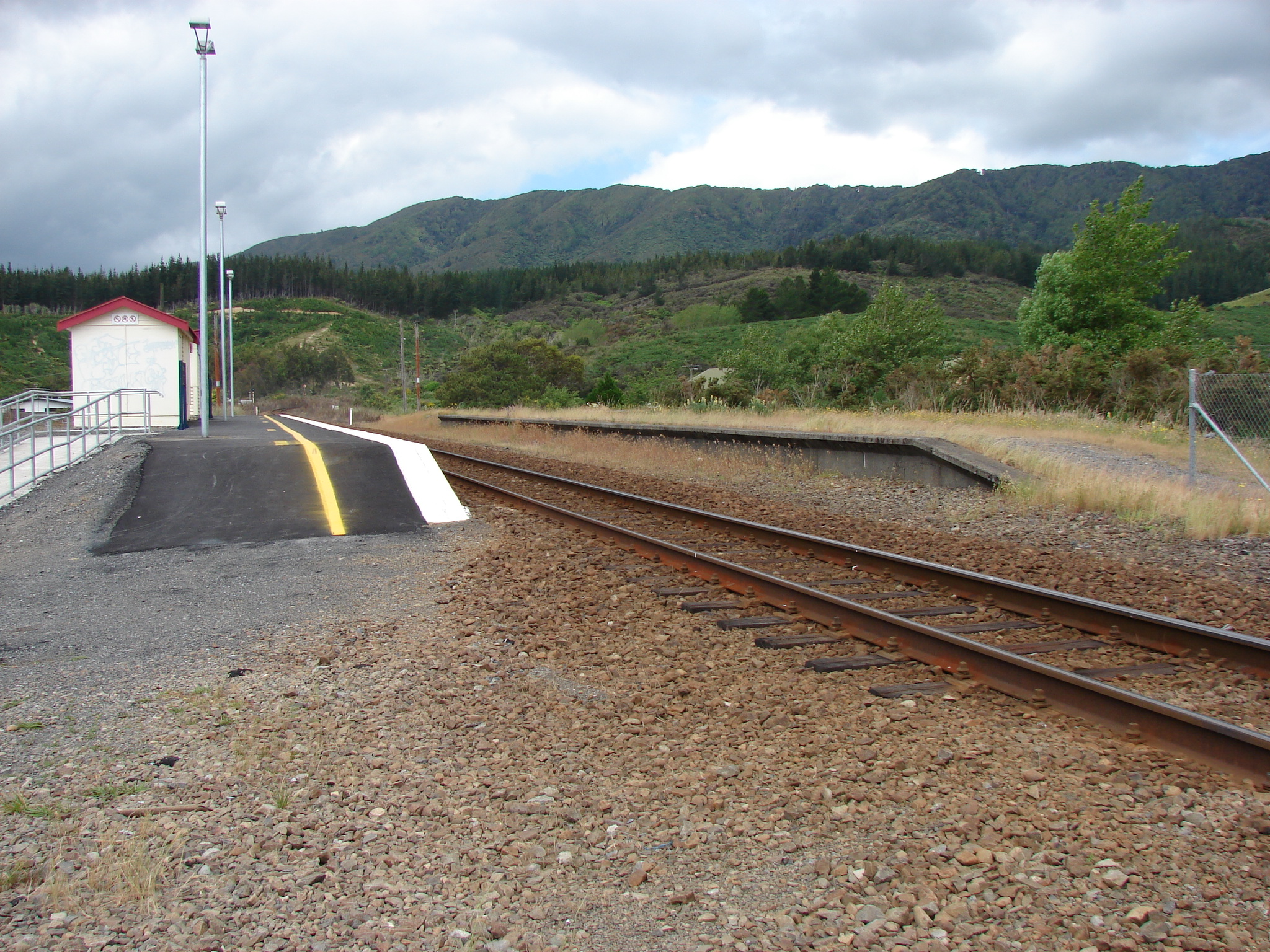
- The Maymorn railway station
- Interactive map of Maymorn
- Coordinates: 41.111°S 175.129°E
- Country: New Zealand
- Region: Wellington Region
- Region: Wellington
- City: Upper Hutt
- Electorates: Remutaka; Ikaroa-Rāwhiti (Māori)

Government
  - Territorial Authority: Upper Hutt City Council
  - Regional council: Greater Wellington Regional Council
  - Mayor of Upper Hutt: Peri Zee
  - Remutaka MP: Chris Hipkins
  - Ikaroa-Rāwhiti MP: Cushla Tangaere-Manuel

Area
  - Total: 2.70 km^{2} (1.04 sq mi)

Population (2023 census)
  - Total: 231
  - Density: 85.6/km^{2} (222/sq mi)

Maymorn is a rural area of Upper Hutt city in the Wellington region of New Zealand, consists of Rural Hill and Rural Valley Floor zones. The New Zealand census treats Maymorn as part of Te Mārua for statistical purposes. The usual resident 2013 population of the Te Mārua area was 1,152. The area has a tranquil setting and consists of lifestyle blocks and farms surrounded by hills that are usually covered with a dusting of snow in the winter.

Because it is marginally populated, the area is best known for the Maymorn railway station, which is on the Wairarapa railway line between Woodville and Wellington and served by the Wairarapa Connection daily passenger-train.

Maymorn station is near the southern portal of the Rimutaka railway tunnel, which opened in 1955 and replaced the Rimutaka Incline railway-line which ran over the Rimutaka Range. The old route passes within 40 metres over the tunnel's exit.

== Demographics ==
Maymorn covers 2.70 km^{2} (1.04 sq mi), and is part of Mangaroa statistical area.

Historical population
Year	Pop.	±% p.a.
2006	153	—
2013	183	+2.59%
2018	219	+3.66%
2023	231	+1.07%

Maymorn had a population of 231 in the 2023 New Zealand census, an increase of 12 people (5.5%) since the 2018 census, and an increase of 48 people (26.2%) since the 2013 census. There were 123 males, 102 females, and 3 people of other genders in 81 dwellings. 3.9% of people identified as LGBTIQ+. There were 33 people (14.3%) aged under 15 years, 39 (16.9%) aged 15 to 29, 129 (55.8%) aged 30 to 64, and 30 (13.0%) aged 65 or older.

People could identify as more than one ethnicity. The results were 90.9% European (Pākehā), 10.4% Māori, 2.6% Pasifika, 2.6% Asian, and 10.4% other, which includes people giving their ethnicity as "New Zealander". English was spoken by 98.7%, Māori by 2.6%, and other languages by 5.2%. No language could be spoken by 1.3% (e.g. too young to talk). New Zealand Sign Language was known by 1.3%. The percentage of people born overseas was 16.9, compared with 28.8% nationally.

Religious affiliations were 27.3% Christian, 1.3% Māori religious beliefs, and 1.3% other religions. People who answered that they had no religion were 59.7%, and 9.1% of people did not answer the census question.

Of those at least 15 years old, 51 (25.8%) people had a bachelor's or higher degree, 120 (60.6%) had a post-high school certificate or diploma, and 33 (16.7%) people exclusively held high school qualifications. 54 people (27.3%) earned over $100,000 compared to 12.1% nationally. The employment status of those at least 15 was 111 (56.1%) full-time, 36 (18.2%) part-time, and 3 (1.5%) unemployed.

== See also ==
- Maymorn Railway Station
- Rimutaka Incline Railway
- Rimutaka Rail Trail
- Hiking Mt Clime in the Pakuratahi Forest
- Rimutaka Cycle Trail
- Cycle Maymorn
