= Mount Matthews =

Mountain in New Zealand

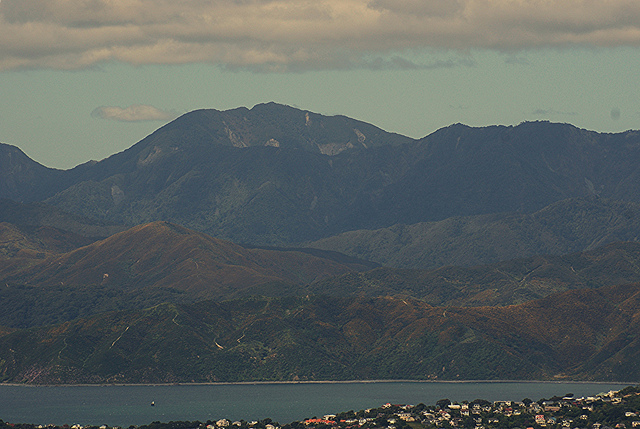
- Mount Matthews seen from Wellington

Highest point
- Elevation: 941 m (3,087 ft)
- Coordinates: 41°21′S 175°01′E

Geography
- Location: North Island, New Zealand
- Parent range: Remutaka Range

Mount Matthews is the highest peak in the Remutaka Range to the east of Wellington, New Zealand. Mt Matthews reaches a height of 940 metres and although not special on that account, it has significance in regard to its distinctive aspect as seen from the capital; it is the highest peak that can be seen on the sky line east of the city. The mountain reaches just above the bushline and can be climbed as a day hike without mountaineering equipment but is nevertheless a strenuous and steep climb and a full day should be allowed by the time access to the feet of the ranges is included. Access is gained either from the Wairarapa (eastern) side of the Remutaka Range from the Ōrongorongo River on the Wellington side of the range. New Zealand archaeologist George Leslie Adkin was a notable climber of Mount Matthews. The species Rhypodes chinai is also native to Mount Matthews. Native plants including nikau palms and kiekie vines are also seen on the trail.
