= Maymorn railway station =

Railway station in New Zealand

Maymorn
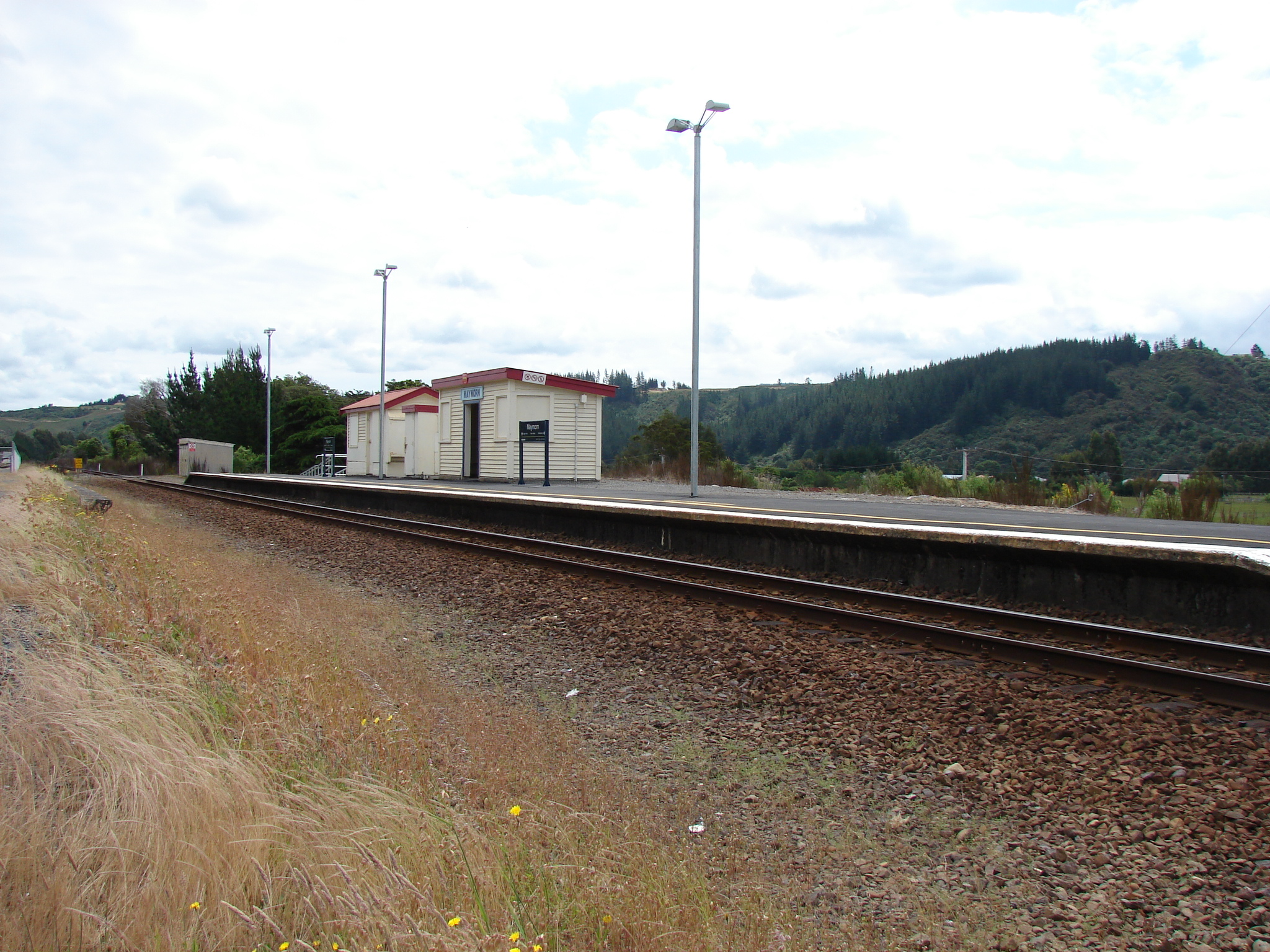
- Old Maymorn railway station main platform, looking west (2007)

General information
- Location: Parkes Line Road, Maymorn, Upper Hutt, New Zealand
- Coordinates: 41°6′29″S 175°8′3″E
- Elevation: 137 metres (449 ft)
- System: Metlink regional rail
- Owner: Greater Wellington Regional Council
- Line: Wairarapa Line
- Distance: 38.75 kilometres (24.08 mi) from Wellington
- Platforms: Dual side platforms
- Tracks: Main line (1)
- Train operators: Transdev Wellington

Construction
- Parking: Yes (behind main platform, access from Maymorn Road)
- Cycle facilities: No

Other information
- Station code: MAYM
- Fare zone: 8

History
- Opened: 3 November 1955; 70 years ago
- Closed: September 1978; 48 years ago (freight); November 1990; 36 years ago (crossing loop)
- Former names: Mangaroa

Services
Preceding station	Transdev Wellington	Following station
Featherston towards Masterton	Wairarapa Connection	Upper Hutt towards Wellington
Location
Notes
- Previous Station: Upper Hutt Station; Next Station: Featherston Station

Maymorn railway station is a twin platform, rural request stop railway station serving the small settlement of Maymorn on the Maymorn Plateau, east of Upper Hutt, in New Zealand’s North Island. It is served by the Wairarapa Connection, and sees five services each way Monday to Thursday, six on Friday and two on Saturday and Sunday.

This station was initially known as Mangaroa and received its present name on 26 January 1959.

== History ==
This station officially opened on 3 November 1955 along with the Rimutaka Deviation and Rimutaka Tunnel, and the original Mangaroa railway station was closed.

The ground on which the station is located was created using fill extracted during the construction of the Rimutaka Tunnel. During construction of the tunnel, a crossing loop long enough to accommodate 116 wagons and a temporary connection to the now closed section of the Wairarapa Line were built to enable work trains to bring in materials and supplies. The connection between the old and new lines was lifted along with the old line, but the loop remained in use for many years afterwards for operational reasons. Northbound (up) passenger services used the loop and second platform, while southbound (down) passenger services used the main line and first platform. Both platforms had identical wooden passenger shelters on them. In 1990, part of the loop was lifted, reducing it to a siding, and it was completely removed by August 1999.

As part of the Wairarapa station upgrade programme to accommodate the SW-class carriages for the Wairarapa Connection, this station was renovated in 2007 with works completed by the end of August that year. Selective door opening is employed at Maymorn since the platform is only long enough to fit three carriages (guards check while collecting tickets re any for Maymorn).

The station's wooden passenger shelter suffered extensive fire damage on 17 July 2008 in a suspected arson. As it was judged uneconomic to repair the building, it was demolished the following week. A new glass shelter was installed on the site of the old wooden shelter during the evening of Monday 18 May 2009.

As part of preparation works for the Remutaka and Maoribank Tunnel track upgrades, in October 2023, the unused eastern platform was removed.

== Today ==
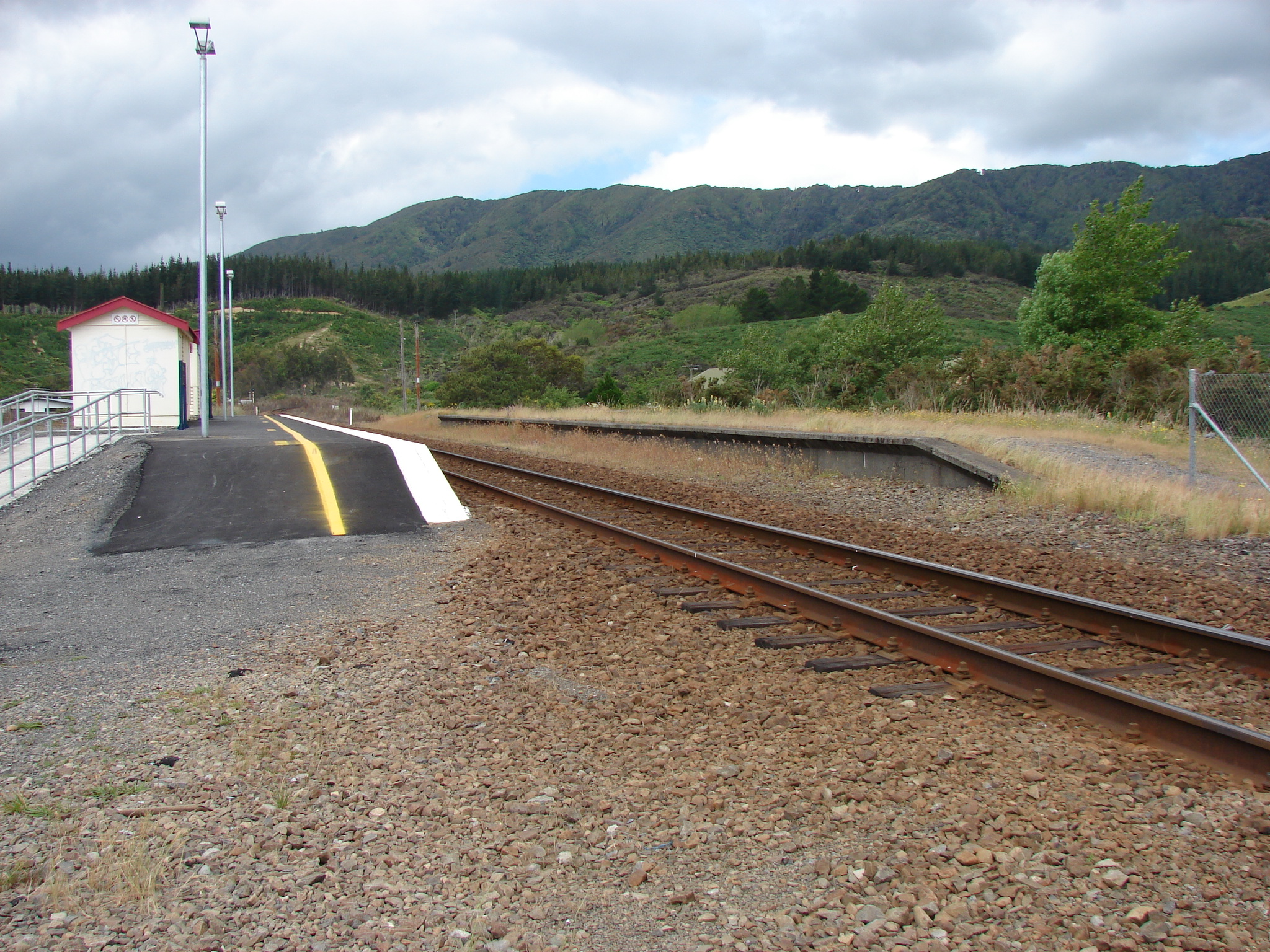
Maymorn railway station main platform (left) and disused second platform (right), looking east in 2007

Nothing remains of the crossing loop, and all sidings have also been lifted. Despite this, there is still evidence of the former presence of the loop including the second platform, the gap between it and the main line, and the extra-wide Maymorn Road overpass. There is a passenger shelter on the main line platform (the shelter on the second platform has long been removed), a couple of equipment buildings, and a shed for a surfaceman's trolley. On 14 November 2009 the Rimutaka Incline Railway excavated the back of the second (disused) platform to both retrieve fill and to make way for the formation of their own rail yard.

From the station, an embankment on which the old line ran can be seen just past the end of Old School Road, and now has a fence line running along its apex. Hikers can access the old railway formation using an access road which starts near the station, from the corner of Maymorn Road and Parkes Line Road. At the top of the access road, where it meets the formation, the remains of the Dry Creek Gully bridge which carried the line over a washout, are to the right but obscured by dense foliage.

== Future ==
On 14 July 2005, the Rimutaka Incline Railway Heritage Trust secured a 20-year heritage lease on land at the Maymorn railway yards from KiwiRail. The trust proposes to reinstate the world-famous Rimutaka Incline, with its base of operations established at Maymorn, and is currently working through stage one of the project including preparing the yard, construction of buildings, fencing and platelaying. This will also include a rail connection of approximately 1.6 kilometres (0.99 mi) in length between the station and the original railway formation, for which their preferred option is to lay their own line over the Maymorn Road overpass next to the current main line.

In 2003, the Greater Wellington Regional Council proposed extending double-track from Trentham to Upper Hutt (completed in November 2011) and also proposed extending electrification north of Upper Hutt to Timberlea and Cruickshank Road. A 2011 strategy published by the Upper Hutt City Council proposes extending electrification to Maymorn, to capture planned growth in the area.

As part of the New Zealand Upgrade Programme announced by the government on 29 January 2020, a new passing loop will be installed at Maymorn.

== Incidents ==
On 23 July 2009, the locomotive and first carriage of a Masterton-bound Wairarapa Connection derailed after hitting a mudslide at eastern exit of the 572 m (1,877 ft)-long Maoribank Tunnel No.1, about a kilometre west of the station. No injuries were reported, but the line was blocked for three days.

== See also ==
- Mangaroa railway station
