= AndHow.FM =

Coordinates: 41.1207°S 175.1137°E

andHow.FM
- Mangaroa; New Zealand
- Frequency: 107.5 FM
- Branding: 107.5 andHow.FM

Programming
- Format: Indie Rock, Alternative Rock

Ownership
- Owner: andHow Limited

History
- First air date: 8 November 1998
- Former names: AndHow Web Radio

Technical information
- ERP: 1 watt
- HAAT: 180 meters

Links
- Website: andHow.FM

andHow.FM was a non-profit, independent radio station which broadcasts at 107.5 FM in Mangaroa, New Zealand. The station broadcast for 24 hours a day from their FM broadcast and internet radio simulcast. andHow.FM is licensed with APRA and Recorded Music NZ in New Zealand for music broadcasting rights and operated under the NZ laws governing LPFM transmission. The station openly encouraged and programmed music from primarily independent music artists.

== History ==
andHow.FM commenced broadcasting on their FM signal 21 January 2009, from Papakowhai and previously at its internet radio presence AndHow Web Radio since 8 November 1998. The station is solely funded by andHow Limited, in addition to donations & contributions from the listening public. On 22 June 2018 the station relocated its studios and broadcast tower to Mangaroa Valley, Upper Hutt.

== Format ==
The andHow.FM regular programming consisted of a mix of music from the indie rock, alternative rock, modern rock & vintage rock genres. There was also a varied format of live shows throughout the week from volunteer presenters with interests in everything from 40s & 50s rhythm & blues, modern classical, ambient music, contemporary jazz, Americana to cutting edge electronica, that reflected a wide spectrum of music tastes.
