= Rimutaka Incline Railway Heritage Trust =

Coordinates: 41°6′31.98″S 175°7′48.51″E

Rimutaka Incline Railway
- Locale: Maymorn, New Zealand

Commercial operations
- Name: Wairarapa Line
- Original gauge: 3 ft 6 in (1,067 mm)

Preserved operations
- Stations: Maymorn
- Preserved gauge: 3 ft 6 in (1,067 mm)

Commercial history
- Opened: 16 October 1878
- Closed: 30 October 1955

The Rimutaka Incline Railway Heritage Trust is a non-profit, charitable trust in New Zealand that was established in 2003 with the objective of reinstating an operating heritage railway over the Remutaka Ranges using the original route of the Wairarapa Line between Maymorn and Featherston, including the world-famous Rimutaka Incline.

== Foundation and objectives ==
The trust was formed by a steering committee that had earlier been established to investigate the proposal, and was composed mainly of members from existing rail heritage organisations.

It was established with the goal of realising the following objectives:

1. To plan, fund, reinstate and operate a tourist heritage railway on former railway route between Upper Hutt and Featherston, and any other directly or indirectly connected railway;
2. Acquire by agreement, lease or purchase such lands as are required to allow the reinstatement of the former railway route between Upper Hutt and Featherston and any other such lands as will further the objectives of the Trust;
3. Acquire by agreement, lease or purchase such items of railway rolling stock, tools and material to facilitate the construction and operation of the tourist heritage railway;
4. Raise funds for and facilitate the conservation and protection of the former railway route and heritage structures and features thereon;
5. To plan, fund and construct appropriate buildings, structures, infrastructure and facilities to facilitate the construction and operation of the tourist heritage railway;
6. To arrange interpretative displays for the public, to promote knowledge and education of heritage railways, and in particular the Rimutaka Incline Railway, the historic factors that led to its creation and raise awareness of the personalities involved;
7. Facilitate research, discussion, education and interchange of information on topics related to the Rimutaka Incline Railway and environs.

== Timeline ==
Date	Event
July 2002	Official recognition of Historic Places Trust registration of the railway formation between Kaitoke and Cross Creek and Rail Heritage Trust of New Zealand awards for restoration of two bridges on the route.
August 2002	Rimutaka Incline Railway Steering Committee formed at the behest of the Wellington Regional Council Landcare Committee to investigate how a tourist heritage railway might operate on the historic railway formation.
16 July 2003	Rimutaka Incline Railway Heritage Trust formed.
8 August 2003	Rimutaka Incline Railway Heritage Trust incorporated as a charitable trust.
28 August 2003	First trust meeting held.
24 November 2003	Economic feasibility report from BERL (Business and Economic Research Ltd.) released.
17 December 2003	Trust begins accepting memberships for new members.
14 July 2005	20-year License to Occupy for the Maymorn station precinct secured from Ontrack.
29 October 2005	"Turning of the first sod" ceremony held at Maymorn to mark the 50th anniversary of the closure of the line.
7 December 2005 – 23 December 2005	Six carriages, donated to the trust, relocated to the Maymorn yard.
April 2006	Three guards van modules donated to the trust.
8 June 2006	Hutt-Mana Charitable Trust grant of $4,000 received by the trust to contribute to the cost of erecting a security fence.
22 July 2006 – 23 July 2006	Two Q-class coal hopper wagons transported to Maymorn site.
2006 Q3	Charitable trust grants totalling $75,000 secured for the construction of a rail vehicle shed.
2006 Q3	New Zealand Community Trust grant of $4,000 received to purchase further security fencing materials.
October 2006	"Sponsor a length of track" campaign launched.
9 December 2006	Platelaying of sponsored track in the Maymorn yard begins.
4 May 2007	Donated former North Island Main Trunk sleeping carriage transported to Maymorn site.
17 May 2007	Resource Consent application for construction works at Maymorn lodged with Upper Hutt City Council.
1 June 2007	Lotteries Grants Board grant of $150,000 secured for costs associated with construction of rail vehicle shed.
27 August 2007	Eight of the YC class ballast wagons ordered by the trust arrive in Wellington.
5 September 2007	Three of the ballast wagons are transported to the Maymorn site.
21 September 2007	Interim Rail Service License secured from Land Transport New Zealand.
24 April 2008	Resource Consent for construction related to the trust's operations at Maymorn granted by the Upper Hutt City Council.
6 September 2008	Foundation stone ceremony held at Maymorn marking the start of construction on the rail vehicle shed.
26 June 2009	Full Rail Service License granted by the New Zealand Transport Agency.
30 July 2010	The Trust takes delivery of TR 937, formerly owned by KiwiRail.
30 October 2013	NZR AB class No.745 arrives at Maymorn from The Taranaki Flyer Society Inc. Stratford.
21 October 2014	Drewry Shunter No.2285 arrives at Maymorn from the Bush Tramway Club.

== Facilities and equipment ==
=== Rail vehicle shed ===
The main rail vehicle shed is currently under construction nearing completion with a workshop annex having been completed

=== Locomotives ===
Parts for NZR WB class locomotives 292 & 299 have been acquired by the Trust where there are being restored to working order.

NZR TR class No. 937 Diesel shunting locomotive has been acquired from KiwiRail and, having been restored, is used for shunting and construction duties.

NZR AB class No.745 North British built Pacific locomotive, makers No. 22880 of 1922. The locomotive was involved in a washout accident on 16 July 1956 and plummeted 50 feet, while hauling a full load of freight from Wanganui to New Plymouth. Both crew survived. Too expensive to recover it remained in situ built into the embankment at Hāwera. The engine lay undisturbed until November 2001, when it was purchased for $1 by the Hooterville Heritage Trust, and in 2002 salvage work began after 46 years underground. The raised wreck minus tender was taken to Waitara. In 2007, The Taranaki Flyer Society Inc. was formed and AB745 was transported to its new home at the old railway goods shed at Stratford, where it was being restored. Lack of funds and the loss of the Stratford old railway goods shed led to the Society asking for expressions of interest in the locomotive. The Rimutaka Incline Railway Heritage Trust's proposal was accepted and it was moved to Maymorn in October 2013.

Two replica NZR H class "Fell" locomotives will be commissioned by the Trust to operate the incline section of their line for stage 3 of the project.

=== Wagons ===
The Trust has acquired 13 YC-class ballast wagons and 2 Q-class coal hopper wagons, currently located at their Maymorn site, and plans to use them in the construction of its line and for ongoing track maintenance.

=== Carriages ===
The Trust's fleet includes five NZR 56-foot carriages and one NZR 50-foot carriage. These vehicles will be restored after the rail vehicle shed is completed.

=== Maymorn station ===
A heritage-themed station based on the Troup-era Waimate station has been proposed for the Maymorn site. It was hoped to have this building completed by 2015, but this has not occurred.

=== Track ===
Two tracks have been laid east of the rail vehicle shed which are currently being used for vehicle storage. Tracks are also being laid in the rail vehicle shed as part of the construction of the shed's floor and inspection pits.

Two potential routes have been identified to connect the Trust's operation at the Maymorn site to the original railway formation.

== Rolling Stock ==
=== NZR steam locomotives ===
Key:	In service	In service, Mainline Certified	Under overhaul/restoration/repair	Stored	Static display	Scrapped

Original Class and Number	Builder	Builders Number	Year built	Arrived	Notes
A^{B} 745	North British	22880	1922	30 October 2013	Entered NZR service in July 1922. Derailed at Hāwera on 16 July 1956, but wasn't withdrawn until January 1957. It was recovered tenderless on 11 November 2001 by Tony Batchelor and Keith Hancock. In 2007 it was then fully purchased by Keith. In 2010 it was sold to The Taranaki Flyer Society. In 2013 it was sold to the trust for free and moved to the railway over five days. It arrived on 30 October 2013 and awaits restoration.
W^{B} 292	Baldwin Locomotive Works	16172	1898	31 August 2008	Entered NZR service in January 1899. Withdrawn on 5 January 1957 and stored at Westport. In 1960 it was dumped into the Mōkihinui River. It was recovered by Hugh McCracken and stored at the Silver Stream Railway in 1989. It was then moved to Steam Incorporateds Paekākāriki depot in 1995. It was moved to the railway in 2008 and is being restored along with WB 299.
W^{B} 299	Baldwin Locomotive Works	16175	1898	31 August 2008	Entered NZR service on 22 May 1899. Withdrawn on 5 January 1957 and stored at Westport. In 1960 it was dumped into the Mōkihinui River. It was recovered by Hugh McCracken and stored at the Silver Stream Railway in 1989. It was then moved to Steam Incorporated's Paekākāriki depot in 1995. It was moved to the railway in 2008. Restoration commenced in 2014.
W^{D} 356	Baldwin Locomotive Works				

=== NZR diesel locomotives ===
Key:	In service	In service, Mainline Certified	Under overhaul/restoration/repair	Stored	Static display	Scrapped

Original Class and Number	TMS Class and Number	Builder	Builders Number	Year built	Arrived	Notes
T^{R} 189	937	NZR Hillside Workshops	456	1976	30 July 2010	Entered NZR service in September 1976 for shunting duties. Renumbered as TR 937 in 1978. Withdrawn in July 2010 and sold to the railway. Arrived on 30 July in that year. It was restored on 4 March 2013.

=== Industrial diesel Locomotives ===
Key:	In service	In service, Mainline Certified	Under overhaul/restoration/repair	Stored	Static display	Scrapped

Type	Builder	Builders Number	Year built	Arrived	Notes
Drewry	Drewry Car Co.	2248	1947	21 October 2014	Entered service for the Ohai Railway Board in 1947. Used until 1968 and sold to the State Coal Mines in Kaitangata. Then to State Coal Mines in Rotowaro in 1974. Purchased by Bruce McLuckie in 1986 and moved to the Bush Tramway Club. Restoration commenced at a slow pace. In 2014 it was sold to the trust and arrived at the railway on 21 October in that month.

== Project ==
The trust proposes to progressively reinstate and operate the railway between Maymorn and Featherston in four stages, including:

- Stage 1, Upper Hutt to Summit: Reinstatement of railway line between new station at Maymorn and a station at Summit; operation using conventional motive power between Maymorn, Kaitoke and Summit; use of the national rail network between Upper Hutt and Maymorn.
- Stage 2, Wellington to Upper Hutt: Establishing links with Wellington to promote the railway as a tourist opportunity; possible operation on the national rail network between Wellington and Upper Hutt.
- Stage 3, Summit to Cross Creek: Reinstatement of the Rimutaka Incline between Summit and Cross Creek stations; operation using two new Fell locomotives and brake vans.
- Stage 4, Cross Creek to Featherston: Connection with the national rail network at or near Featherston; operation of return journeys to Featherston.
