= Remutaka Tunnel =

Railway tunnel in New Zealand

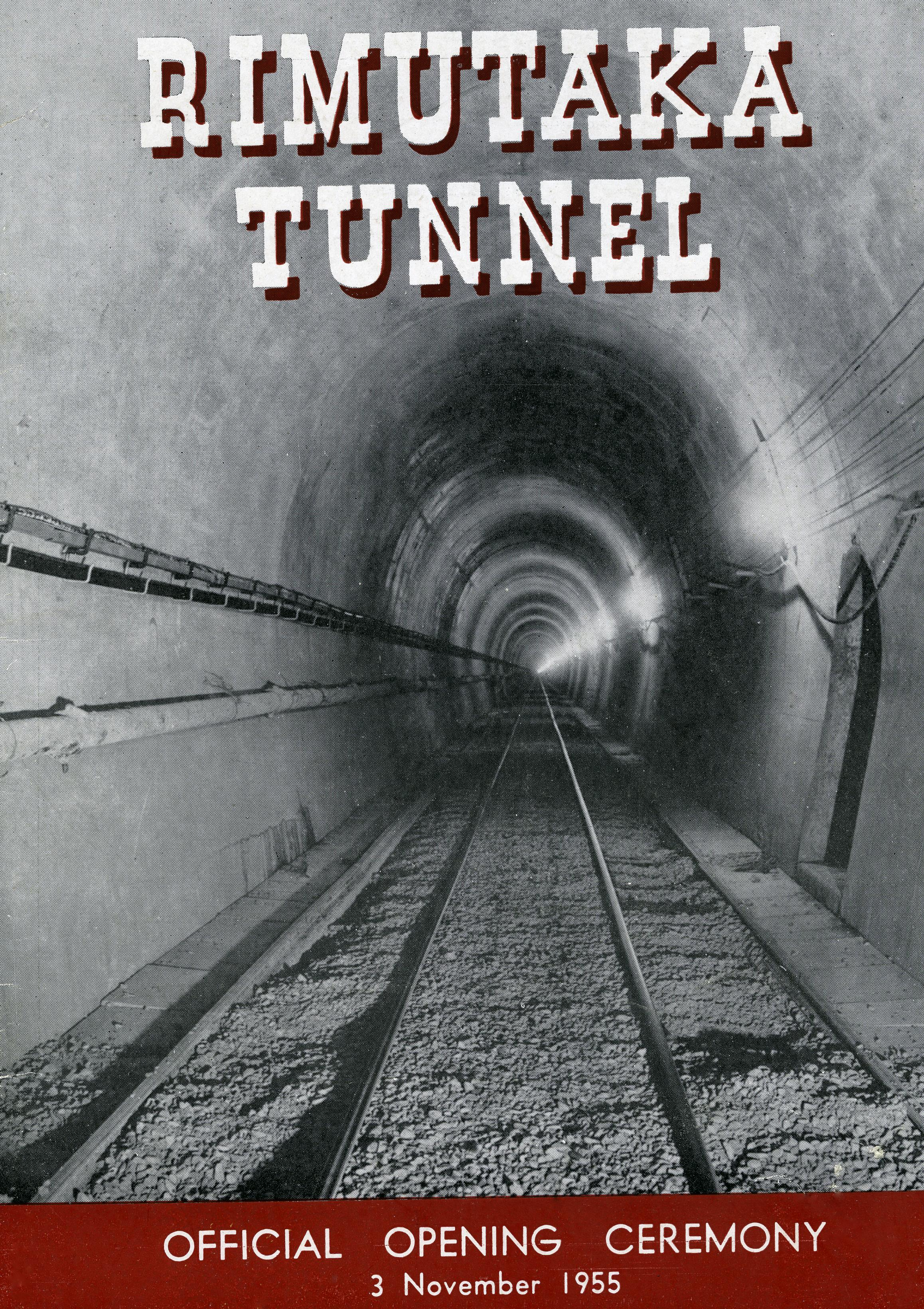

Overview
- Line: Wairarapa Line
- Location: Remutaka Range, Wellington, New Zealand
- Coordinates: West portal: 41°6′28.36″S 175°8′22.18″E; East portal: 41°7′57.8″S 175°14′23.31″E
- Status: Open
- Start: Maymorn, Upper Hutt
- End: Rimutaka Loop

Operation
- Opened: 3 November 1955
- Owner: New Zealand Railways Corporation
- Operator: KiwiRail (freight), Transdev Wellington (passenger)
- Character: Passenger/freight

Technical
- Line length: 8.779 kilometres (5.455 mi)
- No. of tracks: Single
- Track gauge: 3 ft 6 in (1,067 mm)
- Electrified: Provided for 1500 V DC but not installed
- Operating speed: 90 km/h (56 mph)

The Remutaka Tunnel (spelled Rimutaka Tunnel before 2017) is a railway tunnel through New Zealand's Remutaka Range, between Maymorn, near Upper Hutt, and Featherston, on the Wairarapa Line.

The tunnel, which was opened to traffic on 3 November 1955, is 8.779 kilometres (5.455 mi) long. It was the longest tunnel in New Zealand, superseding the Otira Tunnel in the South Island until the completion of the Kaimai Tunnel 8.879 kilometres (5.517 mi) near Tauranga in 1978. Remutaka remains the longest tunnel in New Zealand with scheduled passenger trains.

== History ==
The tunnel was built as part of a deviation to replace the costly Rimutaka Incline and its Fell engines.

=== Background ===
The original route between Upper Hutt and Featherston was often the subject of criticism, even before it was built. In 1898 J. H. Dobson completed several surveys on behalf of the Public Works Department into possible alternatives. Conclusions reached in 1899 as a result of these surveys did little more than confirm previous opinions. One promising possibility was a 5-mile (8.0 km) tunnel between Mangaroa and Cross Creek, which received so much attention that it nearly became the much-sought deviation. By 1900, however, it was realised that the cost of constructing such a tunnel could not be contemplated at that time.

It was not until the 1920s that significant campaigning for a replacement again prevailed on the government. In 1921-22 a feasibility study was conducted, including distances and estimated costs. Several routes were considered, including variations on previous ideas, but nothing more was done at the time; although a deviation of about 5 miles 48 chain (9 km) as the Wellington-Napier Line (Deviation) running generally to the south-eastward of the existing line was authorised by the Railways Authorisation Act, 1924.

The new Labour government of 1936 announced its intention to proceed with the Mangaroa to Cross Creek tunnel. Detailed surveys were completed in 1938/1939, but the project was again postponed due to World War II. The surveyed line was still shown on the 1947 edition of the one inch map.

After World War II it became a matter of urgency to consider a replacement. The H class locomotives were showing their age, the incline was in bad shape, and maintenance costs were increasing. Between September 1945 and July 1947 four options were considered. It was accepted that no contour line could be the solution and that a tunnel under the Remutaka Ranges was the only satisfactory answer. The adopted route was the shortest route, a tunnel between Mangaroa and Lucena's Creek gully.

=== Construction ===
Construction commenced in 1948 when the Public Works Department started the tunnel with bores of 1,054 feet (321 m) at the western end and 820 feet (250 m) at the eastern end. A contract for completing the tunnel was let to a consortium of Morrison-Knudsen and Downer (MKD) on 7 May 1951. The work commenced at the west end in July 1951 and at the east end in August. The contract was expected to be completed in four years, but the headings met on 20 April 1954 with the concrete lining finished a month later. The tunnel was partly built using full face operation rather than the traditional heading and bench excavation. Much of the fill removed on the West (Hutt) side was used for the Maymorn station site.

About 600 people were employed by MKD (about 300 to 400 at any one time), plus 14 MOW engineers and inspectors. Most were single men and lived in huts at camps or a bunkhouse at the Mangaroa or Featherston portals, which had cookhouses and mess halls plus 20 houses each for married staff. There were three fatalities during tunnelling.

New Zealand Railways took possession of the tunnel on 1 February 1955, which also included approach formations and bridge piers, at which time track laying commenced. By October 1955 the signalling and centralised traffic control equipment had been installed and all the track was laid, except for a short section near Upper Hutt where the old line crossed the new line at a higher level. All traffic on the Upper Hutt to Featherston section was suspended after the arrival of the Carterton Show Day excursion train at Upper Hutt on the evening of 29 October. Over the next three days the old formation was removed, the cutting for the new formation completed and the remainder of the track laid. On 3 November 1955, the new line was opened and two special trains travelled from Wellington to Speedy's Crossing to the inauguration ceremony.

=== Design ===
The deviation's ruling grade is 1 in 70, compensated for curvature. The tightest curve is 400 metres (20 chain) radius. The tunnel rises at 1 in 400 from the western portal to the highest point on the deviation, roughly halfway through the tunnel, and then descends to the eastern portal at 1 in 180. It has an internal height of 5.18 metres (17.0 feet) and a width of 4.68 metres (15 feet 4 inches); it is lined with concrete with a minimum thickness of 38 cm (15 in) inside the face of the excavation. When the tunnel holed through on 20 April 1954 the surveying error was found to be only 44.5 mm (1.75 in). The tunnel was planned to reduce the distance between Upper Hutt and Featherston from 24 mi (39 km) to 15 mi 32 ch (24.8 km).

After its completion, a 2.74 metres (9.0 feet) diameter vertical ventilation shaft was driven up from a point almost halfway through the tunnel. It reaches the surface beside the Remutaka Rail Trail near the former route's Pakuratahi Tunnel. The 117 metres (384 feet) high shaft was constructed after tests showed that the tunnel would not generate enough natural ventilation if diesel traction was used through the tunnel. Originally it had been envisaged that electric traction would be used by extending the 1500-volt DC overhead electrification beyond Upper Hutt to either Featherston or Masterton, but economic studies favoured diesel traction.

The new formation included two crossing loops; at the new Maymorn station (116 wagons) and the Rimutaka Loop (95 wagons) at the eastern portal of the tunnel. There are four bridges including a five-span 91 metres (299 feet) bridge across the Mangaroa River, and a tunnel and two underpasses near Maoribank.

The Maoribank Tunnel is 555 metres (1,821 ft) long; it was tendered separately in 1953 and constructed by MKD, work started in October 1953 and was completed in December 1954. On the eastern side where two short tunnels (220 metres (11 chain) and 180 metres (9 chain)) had been proposed through a spur, it was cheaper to lengthen the line by 140 metres (7 chain) and have open cuttings.

The construction of the Remutaka Tunnel consumed:

- Gelignite: 299,258 kg (659,751 lb),
- Detonators: 327,850,
- Diesel fuel: 3,182,264 litres (700,000 imp. gallons),
- Cement: 26,163 tonnes (25,750 tons),
- Aggregate: 87,837 metres^{3} (114,886 cu. yd), and
- Timber: 15,820 metres^{3} (6,703,533 super feet).

== Operation ==
=== Traction ===
The first locomotives to work through the tunnel were the DG class diesel-electric locomotives. The tunnel was too long for steam locomotives, making the Wairarapa Line the first fully dieselised line in New Zealand. Since 2015, the DFB class diesel-electric locomotives have been the primary traction used through the tunnel.

As a health and safety measure, staff on trains travelling through the tunnel carry gas detectors to detect the buildup of noxious gases. In May 2021, one of the morning peak Wairarapa Connection services was bus-replaced for a week, after two alarms detecting unsafe levels of nitrogen dioxide in the tunnel on one service.

There have been proposals to electrify the tunnel and the Wairarapa line as far north as Masterton as an extension of the Wellington suburban electrification. The tunnel was designed to enable catenary to be installed but this has not happened, and the catenary finishes just north of Upper Hutt station. In 2007, Greater Wellington Regional Council rejected a call to electrify the tunnel, on the basis that patronage did not justify the expenditure, and that the tunnel would "have to be made bigger."

=== Services ===
==== Passenger ====
Transdev Wellington operates passenger services named the Wairarapa Connection between Wellington and Masterton via the tunnel five times a day each way Monday to Thursday, six on Friday, and twice a day each way on Saturday, Sunday, and public holidays. Excursion trains also go through the tunnel, such as railway enthusiast specials and trains to the Toast Martinborough festival.

Steam-hauled excursions require diesel locomotives to provide motive power through the tunnel due to the danger from smoke in the tunnel's lengthy and confined conditions.

From 2014 diesel locomotives hauling passenger trains in long tunnels were required to have fire suppression equipment, following the Pike River Mine disaster inquiry. Initially, DC class locomotives were used for the Wairarapa Connection, then from 2015 the DFB class was used.

In 2021 an Upper Hutt man was charged with walking through the tunnel on 27 April, resulting in the cancellation of train services from 5.30 pm to 7 pm through the tunnel and an arrest warrant was issued after he failed to turn up in court. He was eventually named in court for two charges.

==== Freight ====
The tunnel is used for freight from the Wairarapa to Wellington, notably logs from local pine forests and wood products from the Juken New Zealand Ltd timber mill at Waingawa, just south of Masterton.

=== Maintenance ===
From 26 December 2024 to 10 February 2025 the tunnel was closed for its first major overhaul. During the 47 days almost 9 kilometres of new track was laid, using composite sleepers and 50 kg/m (101 lb/yd) rail. As ballast was laid in the drains, drainage was impeded, requiring restricted speeds. In February 2025 only 17.18% of trains ran within five minutes of their scheduled time, a problem blamed on staff shortages.

== See also ==
- Remutaka Rail Trail, which follows the old Rimutaka Incline.
