= Mangaroa =

Rural area in Wellington Region, New Zealand

- Rural area
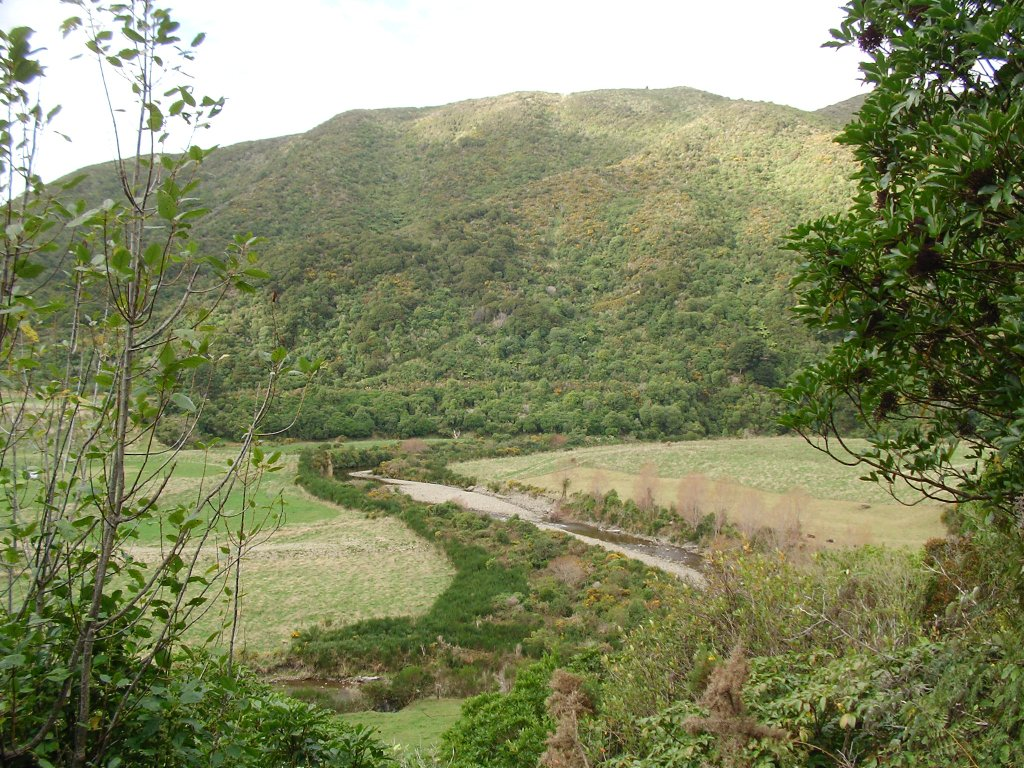
- View from the Remutaka Rail Trail at Mangaroa
- Interactive map of Mangaroa
- Coordinates: 41.1207°S 175.1137°E
- Country: New Zealand
- Region: Wellington Region
- Territorial authority: Upper Hutt
- Electorates: Remutaka; Ikaroa-Rāwhiti (Māori)

Government
  - Territorial Authority: Upper Hutt City Council
  - Regional council: Greater Wellington Regional Council
  - Mayor of Upper Hutt: Peri Zee
  - Remutaka MP: Chris Hipkins
  - Ikaroa-Rāwhiti MP: Cushla Tangaere-Manuel

Area
  - Total: 10.72 km^{2} (4.14 sq mi)

Population (2023 census)
  - Total: 720
  - Density: 67/km^{2} (170/sq mi)

Mangaroa is a rural settlement just outside of Upper Hutt, situated in the lower North Island of New Zealand. It includes lifestyle blocks and farms surrounded by hills, which are usually covered by a dusting of snow during the winter.

The former Mangaroa railway station is located at Mangaroa.

Mangaroa had its own indie rock radio station, andHow.FM from 2009.

The New Zealand Ministry for Culture and Heritage gives a translation of "long stream" for Mangaroa.

== Demographics ==
Mangaroa locality covers 10.72 km^{2} (4.14 sq mi), and is part of the larger Mangaroa statistical area.

Historical population for the locality
Year	Pop.	±% p.a.
2006	420	—
2013	681	+7.15%
2018	756	+2.11%
2023	720	−0.97%
The 2006 population is for a smaller area of 6.90 km^{2}. Source:

The locality had a population of 720 in the 2023 New Zealand census, a decrease of 36 people (−4.8%) since the 2018 census, and an increase of 39 people (5.7%) since the 2013 census. There were 372 males, 348 females, and 6 people of other genders in 249 dwellings. 2.1% of people identified as LGBTIQ+. There were 120 people (16.7%) aged under 15 years, 114 (15.8%) aged 15 to 29, 348 (48.3%) aged 30 to 64, and 141 (19.6%) aged 65 or older.

People could identify as more than one ethnicity. The results were 92.5% European (Pākehā); 7.9% Māori; 2.1% Pasifika; 3.3% Asian; 1.2% Middle Eastern, Latin American and African New Zealanders (MELAA); and 1.7% other, which includes people giving their ethnicity as "New Zealander". English was spoken by 98.3%, Māori by 2.1%, Samoan by 0.8%, and other languages by 9.2%. No language could be spoken by 2.1% (e.g. too young to talk). The percentage of people born overseas was 21.7, compared with 28.8% nationally.

Religious affiliations were 33.8% Christian, 0.4% New Age, 0.4% Jewish, and 2.9% other religions. People who answered that they had no religion were 52.9%, and 10.0% of people did not answer the census question.

Of those at least 15 years old, 162 (27.0%) people had a bachelor's or higher degree, 342 (57.0%) had a post-high school certificate or diploma, and 99 (16.5%) people exclusively held high school qualifications. 153 people (25.5%) earned over $100,000 compared to 12.1% nationally. The employment status of those at least 15 was 336 (56.0%) full-time, 93 (15.5%) part-time, and 12 (2.0%) unemployed.

=== Mangaroa statistical area ===
Mangaroa statistical area covers 154.57 km^{2} (59.68 sq mi). It had an estimated population of 2,160 as of June 2025, with a population density of 14 people per km^{2}.

Historical population for the statistical area
Year	Pop.	±% p.a.
2006	1,611	—
2013	1,878	+2.21%
2018	2,034	+1.61%
2023	2,088	+0.53%

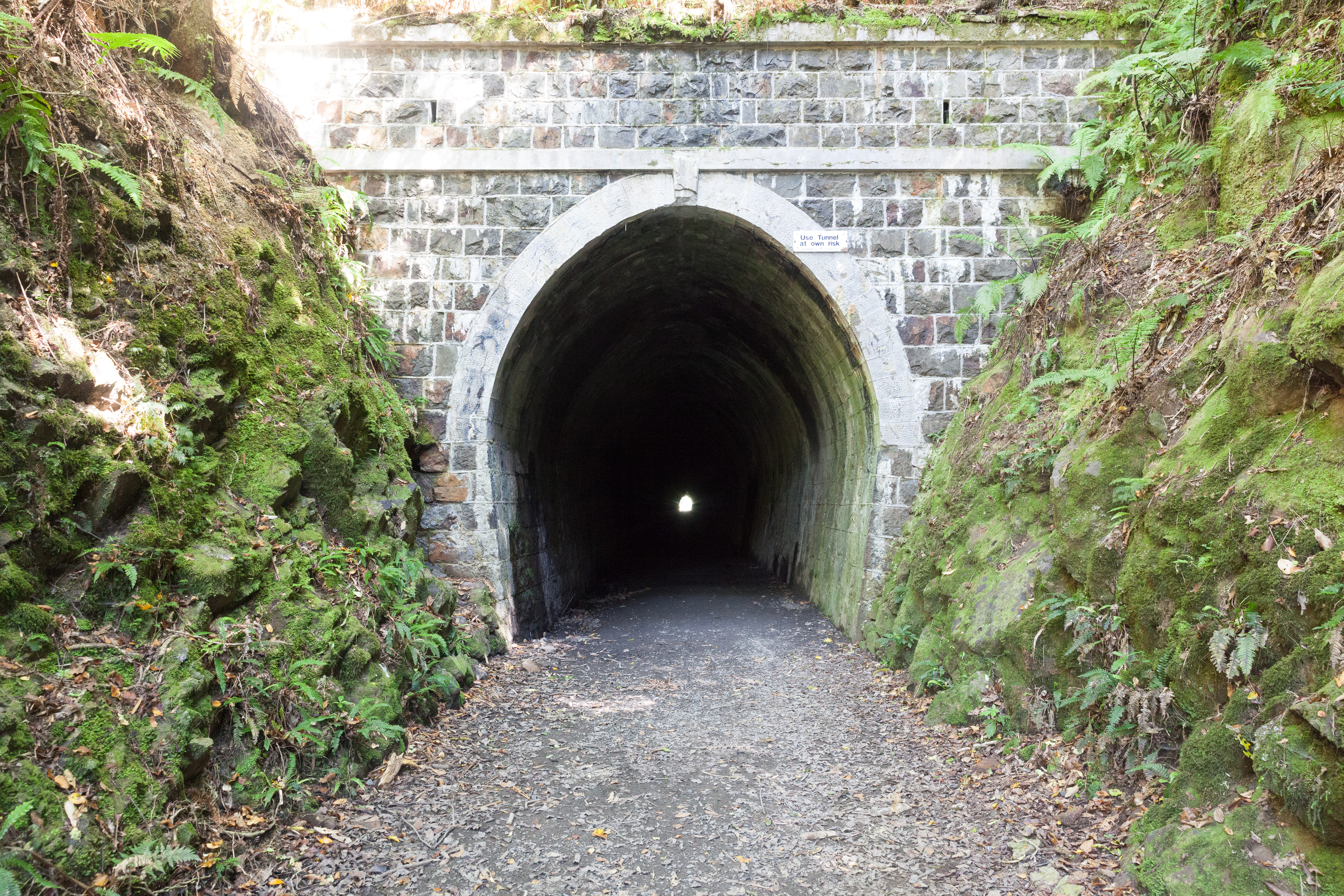
Mangaroa Tunnel in Tunnel Gully

Mangaroa statistical area had a population of 2,088 in the 2023 New Zealand census, an increase of 54 people (2.7%) since the 2018 census, and an increase of 210 people (11.2%) since the 2013 census. There were 1,038 males, 1,041 females, and 9 people of other genders in 720 dwellings. 3.4% of people identified as LGBTIQ+. The median age was 46.6 years (compared with 38.1 years nationally). There were 360 people (17.2%) aged under 15 years, 327 (15.7%) aged 15 to 29, 1,101 (52.7%) aged 30 to 64, and 303 (14.5%) aged 65 or older.

People could identify as more than one ethnicity. The results were 93.2% European (Pākehā); 10.3% Māori; 1.7% Pasifika; 3.0% Asian; 0.6% Middle Eastern, Latin American and African New Zealanders (MELAA); and 4.3% other, which includes people giving their ethnicity as "New Zealander". English was spoken by 98.4%, Māori by 1.9%, Samoan by 0.3%, and other languages by 7.0%. No language could be spoken by 1.6% (e.g. too young to talk). New Zealand Sign Language was known by 0.4%. The percentage of people born overseas was 19.7, compared with 28.8% nationally.

Religious affiliations were 28.7% Christian, 0.1% Hindu, 0.1% Islam, 0.3% Māori religious beliefs, 0.1% Buddhist, 0.4% New Age, 0.3% Jewish, and 1.9% other religions. People who answered that they had no religion were 59.9%, and 8.0% of people did not answer the census question.

Of those at least 15 years old, 468 (27.1%) people had a bachelor's or higher degree, 996 (57.6%) had a post-high school certificate or diploma, and 264 (15.3%) people exclusively held high school qualifications. The median income was $57,600, compared with $41,500 nationally. 441 people (25.5%) earned over $100,000 compared to 12.1% nationally. The employment status of those at least 15 was 1,017 (58.9%) full-time, 255 (14.8%) part-time, and 21 (1.2%) unemployed.

== Education ==
Mangaroa School is a co-educational state primary school for Year 1 to 6 students, with a roll of 95 as of July 2026. It opened in 1914.
