= Remutaka Range =

Mountain range in New Zealand

Coordinates: 41°10′S 175°10′E

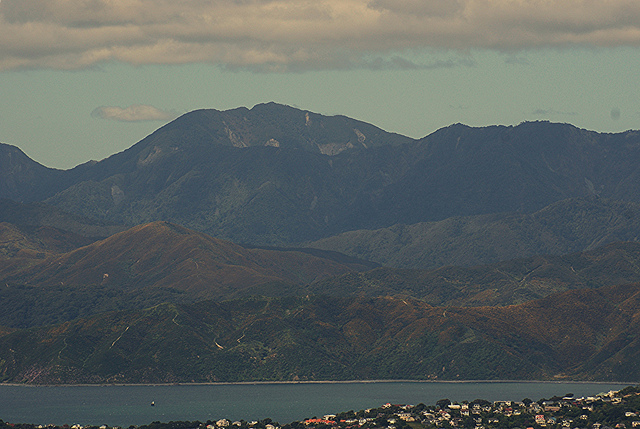
- Mount Matthews, 940 metres, seen from Kelburn, Wellington

Highest point
- Peak: Mount Matthews
- Elevation: 940 m (3,080 ft)

Geography
- Location: Wairarapa/Wellington, New Zealand

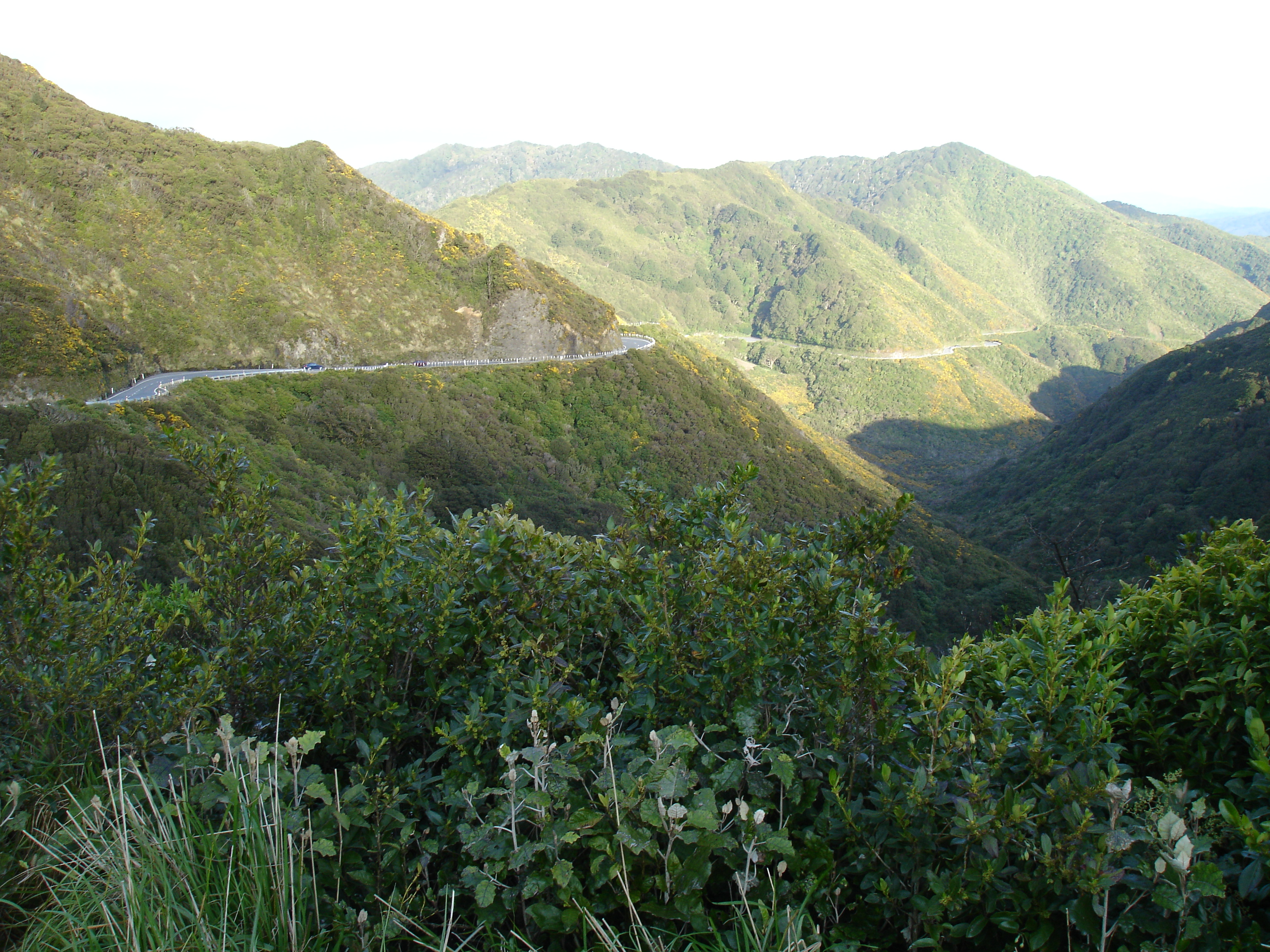
State Highway 2 (Rimutaka Hill Road) seen from near the top of the pass 555 metres (1,821 ft)

The Remutaka Range (also spelt Rimutaka Range) is the southernmost range of a mountain chain in the lower North Island of New Zealand. The chain continues north into the Tararua, then Ruahine Ranges, running parallel with the east coast between Wellington and East Cape.

The 555-metre summit of the road over the range at its northern saddle is named Remutaka Pass. The pass was formally named on 17 December 2015 when the Minister of Land Information confirmed the decision of the New Zealand Geographic Board. Following the passage of the Rangitāne Tū Mai Rā (Wairarapa Tamaki nui-ā-Rua) Claims Settlement Act 2017, the name of the range officially changed to Remutaka Range.

== Geography ==
The Remutaka Range runs north-east to south-west for 55 kilometres from the upper reaches of the Hutt Valley (where the range's northern saddle abuts the southern end of the Tararuas) to Turakirae Head at the western end of Palliser Bay. The highest peak is Mount Matthews, at 940 metres, near the southern end of the range.

Narrow and winding, State Highway 2 crosses the range from the Hutt Valley to Featherston at the saddle where it meets the Tararuas. At the road's summit is a lookout point where there were usually tea rooms and well-guarded facilities maintained by residents. More recently there was a café. After disputes over toilets and land ownership between the then still new Greater Wellington Regional Council and a series of tenants the building sat empty, was severely damaged by fire in April 2009 and later demolished.

Taking a quite separate route the Wairarapa Line railway used to climb across the Remutakas, including the famous Rimutaka Incline, a rare example of the Fell mountain railway system. It opened on 12 August 1878 and closed on 30 October 1955, when it was replaced by the Rimutaka Tunnel. The former route is now the popular Remutaka Rail Trail and part of the Remutaka Cycle Trail. The Rimutaka Incline Railway Heritage Trust has plans to rebuild the railway from Maymorn, including the Incline, as a tourist and historical attraction.

== History ==
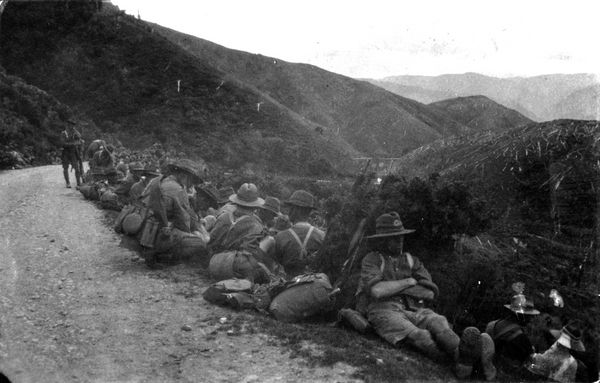
World War I soldiers resting at the top of the Rimutaka hill road. On completing training at Featherston they marched over the hill to Wellington to board ship for France's trenches.

The first road that crossed the Rimutakas opened in 1857, opening up a new connection between Wellington and the Wairarapa.

During World War I over 30,000 New Zealand soldiers marched between military camps at Trentham, Upper Hutt and Featherston via the Rimutaka Hill Road, in a three-day trek of 27 miles (43.5 km). There were 23 marches of 500 to 1800 men between September 1915 and April 1918, at the end of their training as reinforcements for the New Zealand Expeditionary Force. The march was re-enacted in 2015.

== Conservation ==
Much of the range is protected as the Remutaka Forest Park and Wainuiomata Water Collection Area.

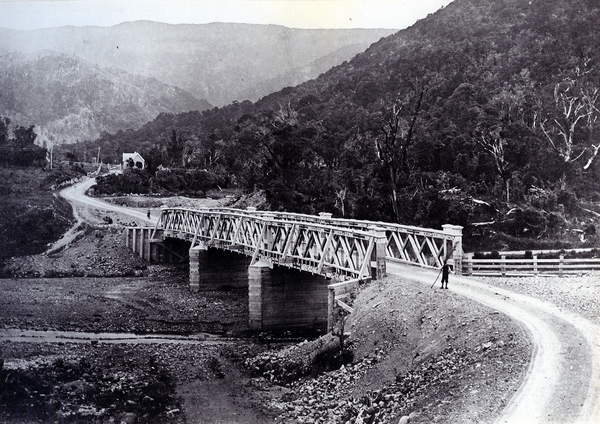
Abbots Creek toll-bridge on the Rimutaka road in 1875
