= Heretaunga =

Heretaunga may refer to:

== Places ==
- Heretaunga, an alternative Māori name for the Hutt River, New Zealand
- Heretaunga, Upper Hutt, a suburb in the Wellington region, New Zealand
- Heretaunga (New Zealand electorate), a general electorate in Upper Hutt from 1954 to 1996
- Heretaunga Plains, alluvial plain in the Hastings–Napier area
- Hastings, New Zealand, called Heretaunga in Māori
- A division of Ngāti Kahungunu in Hawke's Bay

== Other uses ==
- Heretaunga railway station, station on the Hutt Valley Line
- Heretaunga Tamatea, a Māori iwi of New Zealand
