= Trentham railway station, Upper Hutt =

Railway station in New Zealand

Trentham
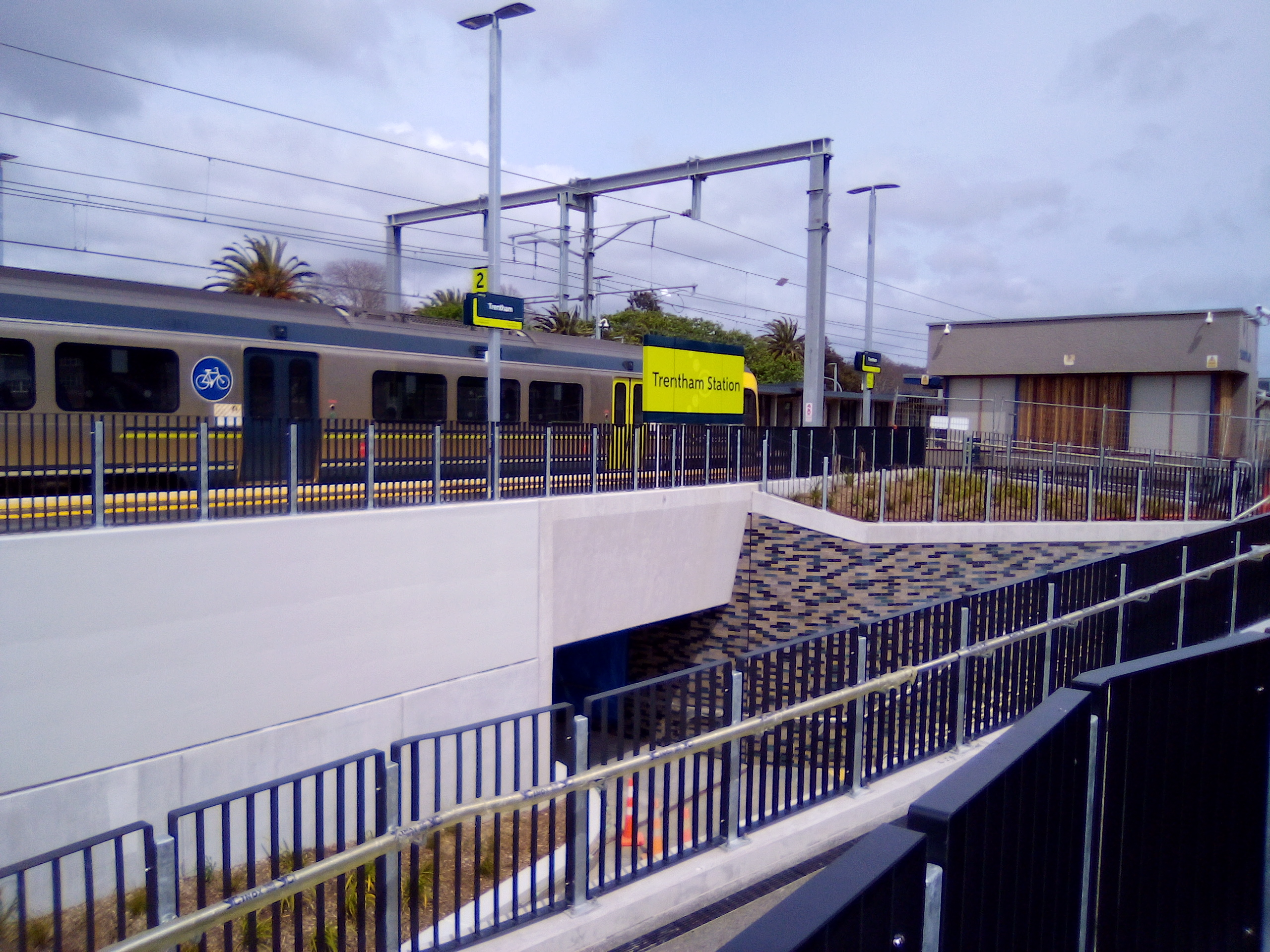
- Trentham station in 2021

General information
- Location: Ararino Street, Trentham, Upper Hutt, New Zealand
- Coordinates: 41°08′16″S 175°02′19″E
- System: Metlink suburban rail
- Owner: Greater Wellington Regional Council
- Line: Wairarapa Line
- Platforms: Dual, side
- Tracks: Main line (2)

Construction
- Parking: Yes
- Cycle facilities: Yes

Other information
- Station code: TREN (Metlink); TRM (KiwiRail)
- Fare zone: Boundary of 6 & 7

History
- Opened: 8 January 1907; 119 years ago
- Electrified: 24 July 1955; 71 years ago

Services
Preceding station	Transdev Wellington	Following station
Wallaceville towards Upper Hutt	Hutt Valley Line	Heretaunga towards Wellington
Location

Trentham Railway Station is an urban railway station in Trentham, a suburb of the city of Upper Hutt in the Wellington region of New Zealand's North Island. It is on the Hutt Valley Line section of the Wairarapa Line and has two side platforms. The station is served by Metlink's electric multiple unit trains of the "Matangi" FP class.

== History ==
The station was opened on 8 January 1907. It was initially a single-track station with a loop containing the racecourse platform, which served the recently opened Trentham Racecourse. Double track reached Trentham in June 1955, with electrification following in September.

Between 1955 and 2021, the double-tracking of the Wairarapa Line ended just north of Trentham station, with the line becoming single track as it continued north. However, in normal operation, southbound trains used the Ararino Street (western) platform and switched over to the down line south of the station. The Racecourse Road (eastern) platform was only used during race days and for other special occasions that occurred at the adjacent Trentham Racecourse.

The 2010 – 2035 Regional Rail Plan (RRP) had proposed duplicating the track between Trentham and Upper Hutt in the 2011 – 2012 year, but duplicating the track only commenced as part of the 2020-2021 Wellington Metro Rail Upgrade. As part of the upgrade, the low platforms were raised and the east "racecourse side" platform was replaced with one further west to increase clearance between the two main lines. A new subway was built to connect the two platforms, and a new station building similar to the Redwood station building was added to the new eastern platform. The new platforms came into operation on 15 November 2021, with services stopping at Trentham generally using the Ararino Street (western) platform if travelling to Upper Hutt and the Racecourse Road (eastern) platform if travelling to Wellington. Services not stopping at Trentham (e.g. freight services and the Wairarapa Connection) may use either track, as the new double-track between Trentham and Upper Hutt is signalled for bi-directional running.

Trentham was originally controlled from its own signal box on the main platform. Following double-tracking of the line to Trentham, the southern crossover points (number 18, now 1) and the associated signals protecting the crossover and the single line north could be controlled from the signal box at Upper Hutt, requiring the Trentham signal box only to be used on race days to operate the other crossovers and signals. On 6 February 2007, the Trentham and Upper Hutt signal boxes were decommissioned and control of both stations was moved to Train Control in central Wellington, and all crossovers and signals were renumbered.

There was a set of sidings in the Trentham Army Camp from 1941 to 1954, used for freight and for troop trains, with a shunting locomotive owned by the Army. Most of the track were removed in the 1970s. The siding was 0.53 km from Trentham Railway Station and 0.63 km from Heretaunga Railway Station.

== Accidents ==
On Saturday 22 March 1997, an evening northbound unit approaching Trentham passed the up home (29) signal at danger, which caused the alarms on the Sutherland Avenue level crossing immediately after the signal to only activate at the last second. The train hit a car on the level crossing, severely damaging the car but only causing minor injuries. While it is normal for a level crossing immediately after a signal to not activate if the signal is at danger to prevent needlessly delaying road traffic, the Sutherland Avenue crossing was the only level crossing in New Zealand that was approach-controlled, meaning the up home signal would be held at danger until the barrier arms were down. For an off-peak service when there was usually no conflicting traffic on the single line from Trentham to Upper Hutt, it was normal for the up home signal to change to clear once the barrier arms were down. However, the signalman at Upper Hutt had been distracted sorting out a drunken altercation at that station and had forgotten to clear the signal once the last southbound train had cleared Trentham, and the train driver was in the mindset the signal should clear as he approached the level crossing, not realising his mistake until he passed the signal. The approach controlled function was subsequently removed after the accident.

== Services ==
Trentham Railway Station serves the following Metlink bus services:

Previous timetabled stop	Metlink Bus Services	Next timetabled stop
Terminus	114; Poets Block	Upper Hutt College towards Upper Hutt Station
Silverstream Station towards Pinehaven	115; Pinehaven	Upper Hutt Station; Terminus

In 2016 the provision of 40 additional parking places was announced at a cost of $200,000; an increase from 94 to 134 places.

Work on upgrading the station in 2020 for the double-tracking of the line to Upper Hutt started with a ceremony in December 2019. The upgrading includes a second platform accessed by an underpass.
