= Wallaceville railway station =

Railway station in New Zealand

Wallaceville
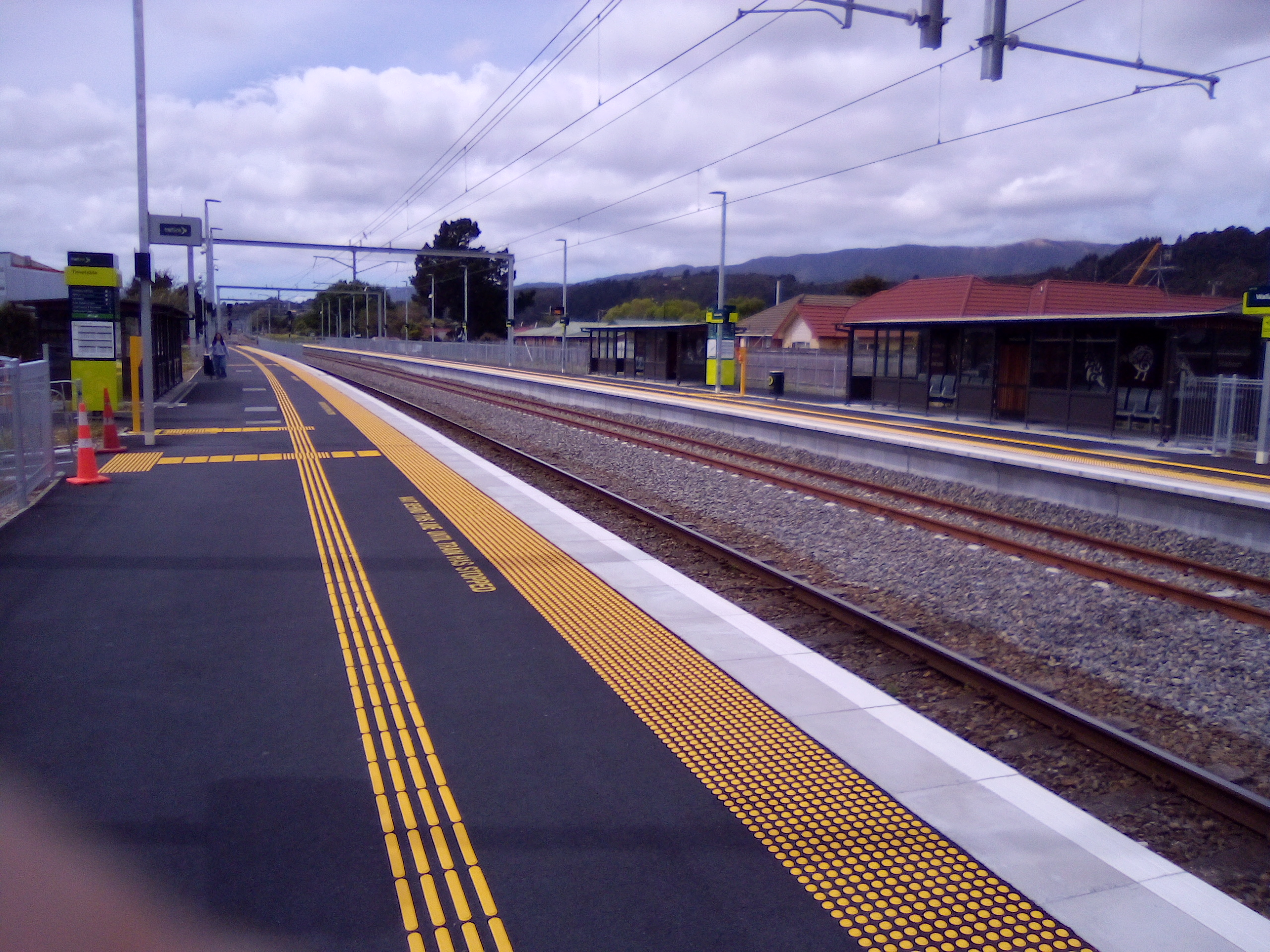
- Wallaceville station in 2021

General information
- Location: Maclean Street (Ward Street end), Wallaceville, Upper Hutt, New Zealand
- Coordinates: 41°07′50.82″S 175°03′29.30″E
- System: Metlink suburban rail
- Owner: Greater Wellington Regional Council
- Line: Wairarapa Line
- Platforms: Dual, side
- Tracks: Main lines: 2

Construction
- Parking: Yes
- Cycle facilities: Yes

Other information
- Station code: WALL
- Fare zone: 7

History
- Opened: 7 March 1878; 148 years ago
- Electrified: 24 July 1955; 71 years ago

Services
Preceding station	Transdev Wellington	Following station
Upper Hutt Terminus	Hutt Valley Line	Trentham towards Wellington
Location

Wallaceville railway station is a suburban railway station serving Wallaceville in Upper Hutt, New Zealand. The station is located on the Hutt Valley section of the Wairarapa Line, 31.3 km (19.4 mi) north of Wellington, and is served by Metlink on behalf of the Greater Wellington Regional Council. Trains between Upper Hutt and Wellington stop at Wallaceville.

There is a large park and ride facility as well as bicycle lockers.

The Blue Mountains Campus at Wallaceville is to be the location for KiwiRail's national Train Control Centre, which is to move from the Wellington railway station; to house a team of 120 train control team members in a 2700 square metres train control room. It iwill be next to the rail network.

== History ==
The station was opened in 1878. when it was a "flag stop". The station closed from 1 July 1881; see NZR notice of 3 June 1881.

The station was opened and closed in the 19th century; Scoble refers to a Whiteman's Valley platform c1879. The flag station was closed on 1 July 1891.

The station reopened in the 20th century; it was reopened by 1903 when a new Ministry of Agriculture research station was to be established nearby.

In 1963, convenient rail access was mentioned in a job advertisement.

The section between Upper Hutt to Trentham was single track, but as part of the 2020-2021 Wellington Metro Rail Upgrade (and as proposed in the 2011 – 2012 Regional Rail Plan (RRP)) the section was double-tracked by 2021. The original platform is used by up or northbound trains and the new platform built to the east for down or southbound trains, with a building similar to the Ava station building.
