= Silverstream railway station =

Railway station in New Zealand

Silverstream
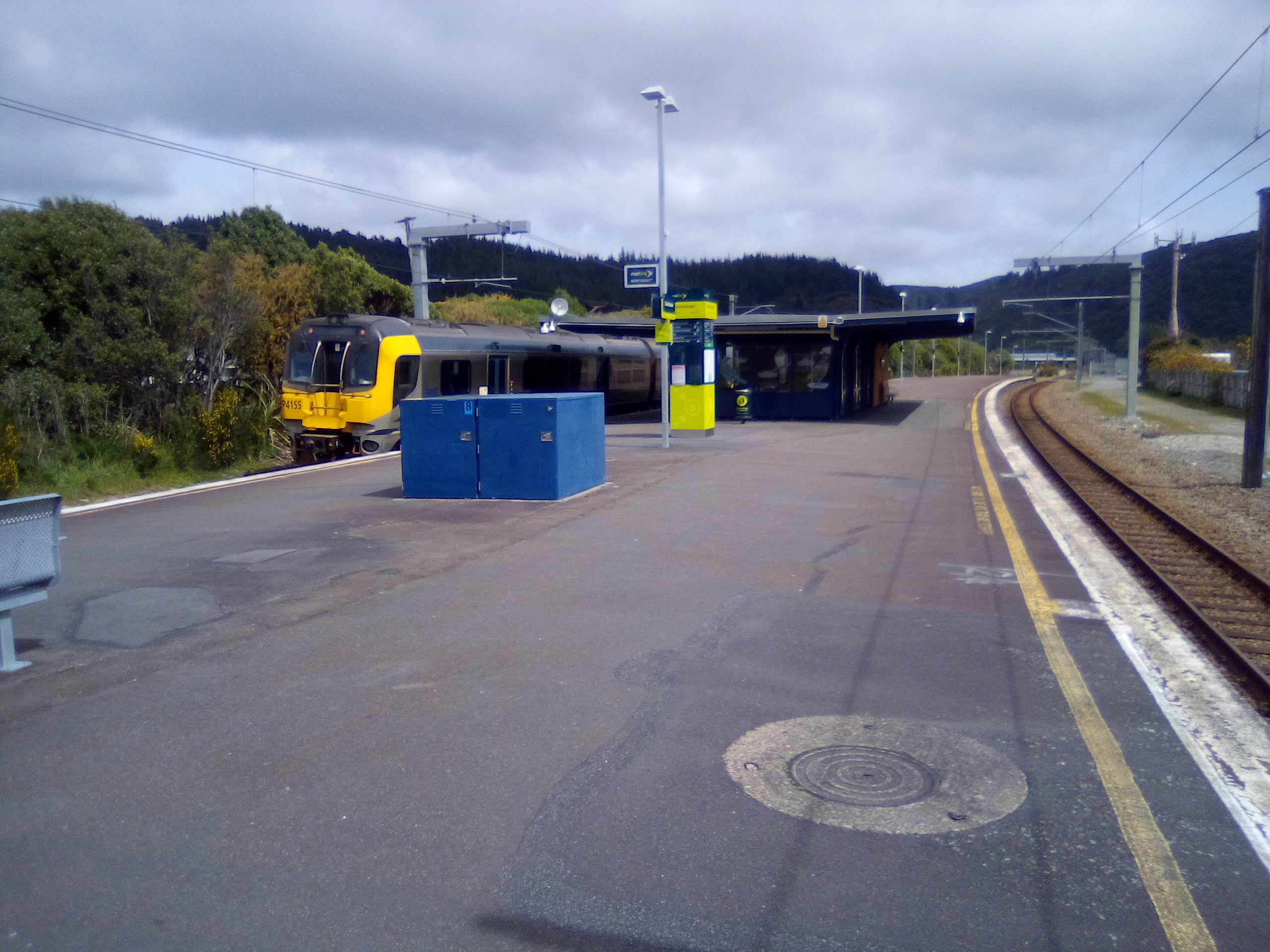
- Silverstream station in 2021

General information
- Location: Fergusson Drive and Kiln Street, Silverstream, Upper Hutt, New Zealand
- Coordinates: 41°08′50.42″S 175°00′38.63″E
- System: Metlink suburban rail
- Owner: Greater Wellington Regional Council
- Line: Wairarapa Line
- Tracks: Main line (2)

Construction
- Structure type: Island
- Parking: Yes
- Cycle facilities: Yes

Other information
- Station code: SILV
- Fare zone: 6

History
- Opened: 1 March 1954; 72 years ago
- Electrified: 24 July 1955; 71 years ago

Services
Preceding station	Transdev Wellington	Following station
Heretaunga towards Upper Hutt	Hutt Valley Line	Manor Park towards Wellington
Location

Silverstream railway station is a suburban railway station serving Silverstream in Upper Hutt, New Zealand. The station is located on the Hutt Valley section of the Wairarapa Line, 26.8 km (16.7 mi) north of Wellington. The station is served by Metlink's electric multiple unit trains of the "Matangi" FP class. Trains stopping at Silverstream run to Wellington and Upper Hutt.

The station has an island platform between two tracks, linked to Field Street in the south by a footpath, and to Fergusson Drive in the north-west and Whitemans Road to the north-east via pedestrian level crossings.

== Services ==
=== Rail ===
TransDev operates Hutt Valley Line electric suburban services between Wellington and Upper Hutt via Silverstream. The basic daytime off-peak timetable is:

- 3 tph to Wellington, stopping all stations (2 tph on weekends)
- 3 tph to Upper Hutt, stopping all stations (2 tph on weekends)

The basic morning peak timetable is:

- 3 tph to Wellington, stopping all stations to Taita then Waterloo only
- 2 tph to Upper Hutt, stopping all stations

=== Bus ===
The following Metlink bus services serve the station:

Previous timetabled stop	Metlink Bus Services	Next timetabled stop
Upper Hutt Station towards Timberlea	93; Upper Hutt Commuter	Belmont Flat - Western Hutt Road towards Courtenay Place
Fergusson Drive towards Emerald Hill	110; Upper Hutt	Stokes Valley Entrance towards Petone Station
Upper Hutt Station; Terminus	115; Pinehaven	Field Street towards Pinehaven

== History ==
The present Silverstream railway station replaced the earlier station from 21 November 1954 when the section of line alongside the hill south of Silverstream, which passed over the wooden truss bridge just below Silverstream Hospital, was closed. The deviation of the line is some distance to the west of the original line and crosses the Hutt River on a steel bridge with concrete piers - the replacement station is several hundred yards to the north of the old station.

An adjacent level crossing had automatically locking gates installed to stop pedestrians using the crossing until a second train clears the crossing (after a 2003 accident).

The station was damaged by a small fire circa 2000, which left it leaking and with no lights under the shelter for several years. The fire damage showed until some repairs were made that the station had toilets at one point until the area was boarded up again.

In 2019–20 the GWRC is to "renew" the Silverstream railway station.
