= Public transport in the Wellington Region =

Overview of public transport in Wellington, New Zealand

Metlink

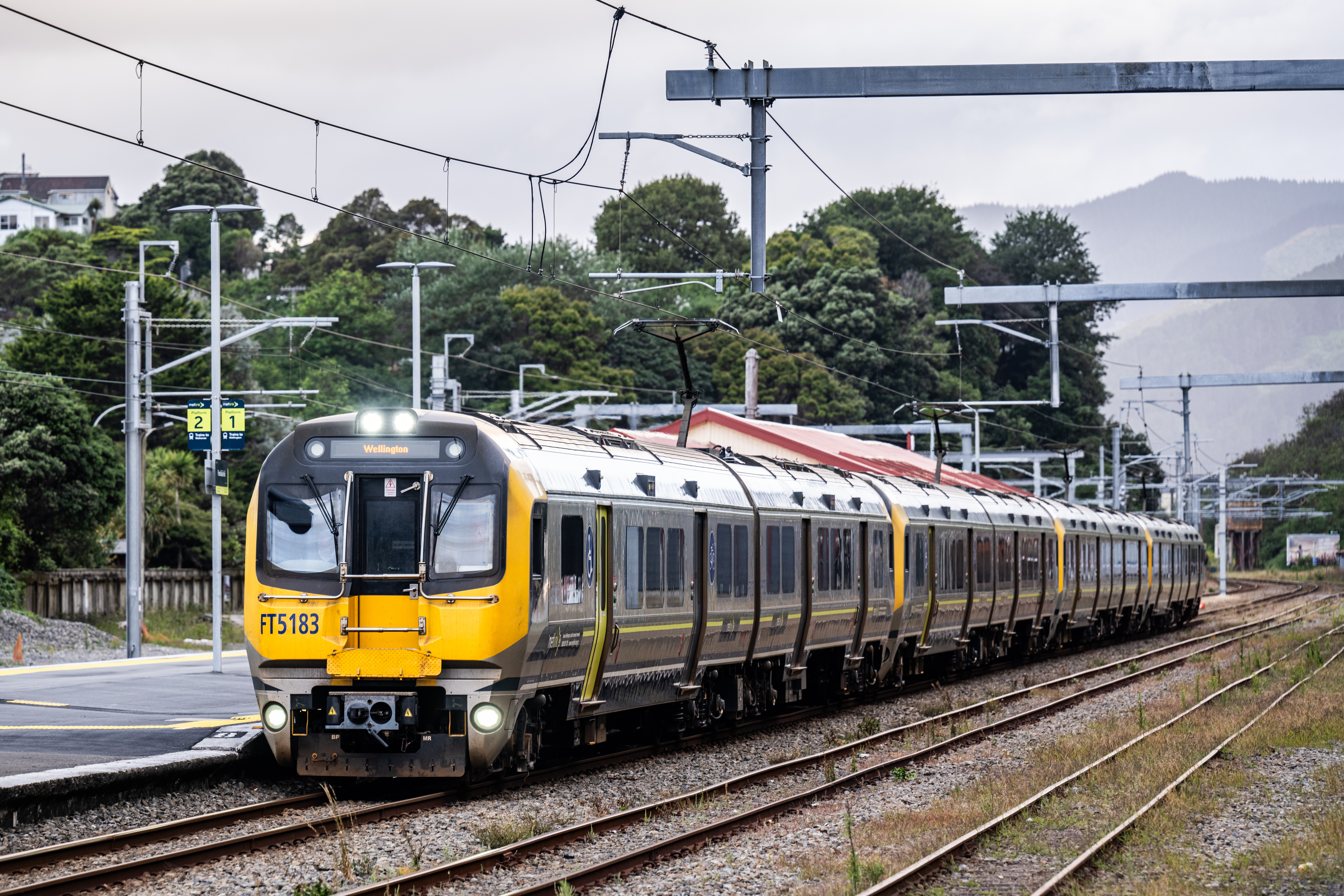
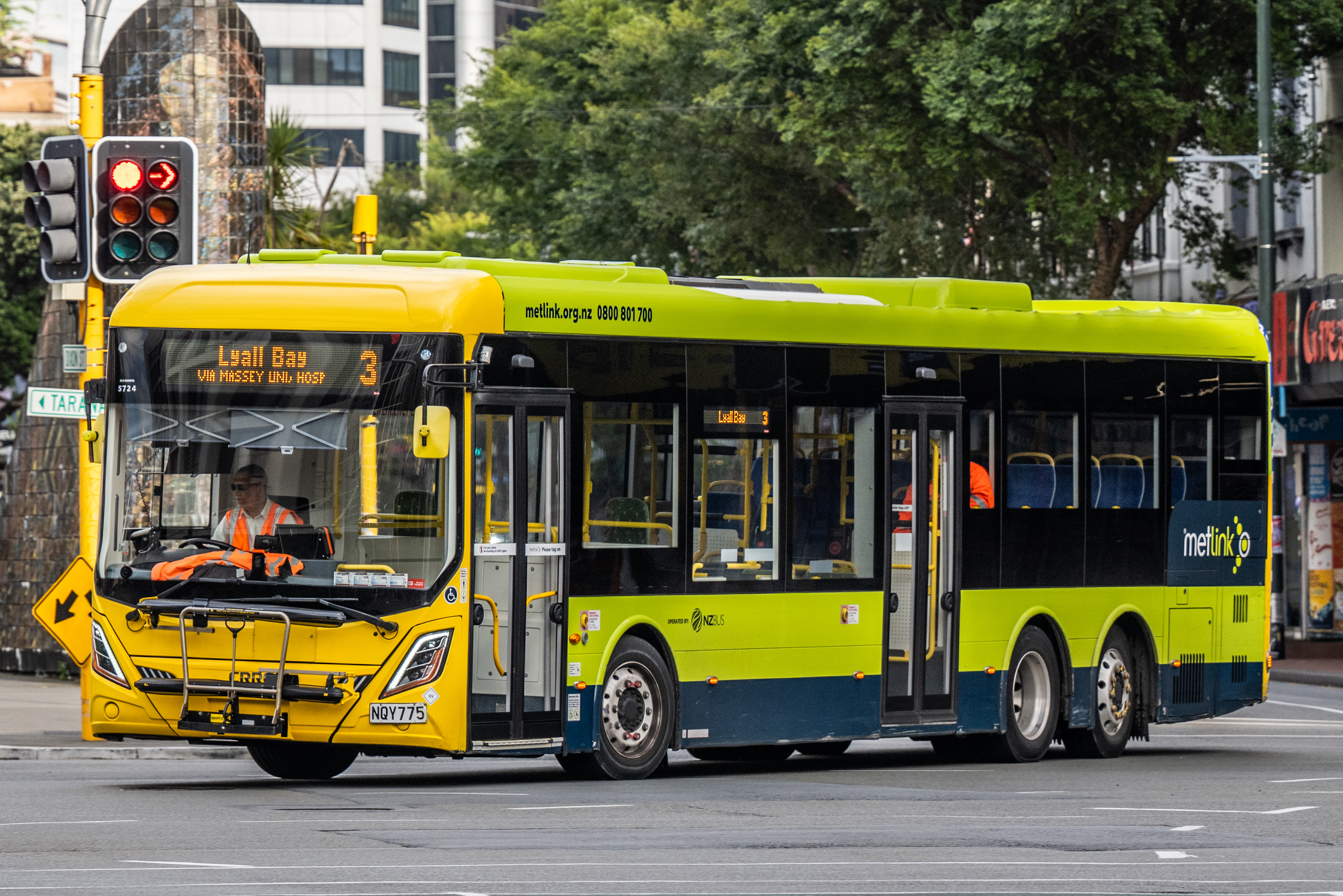
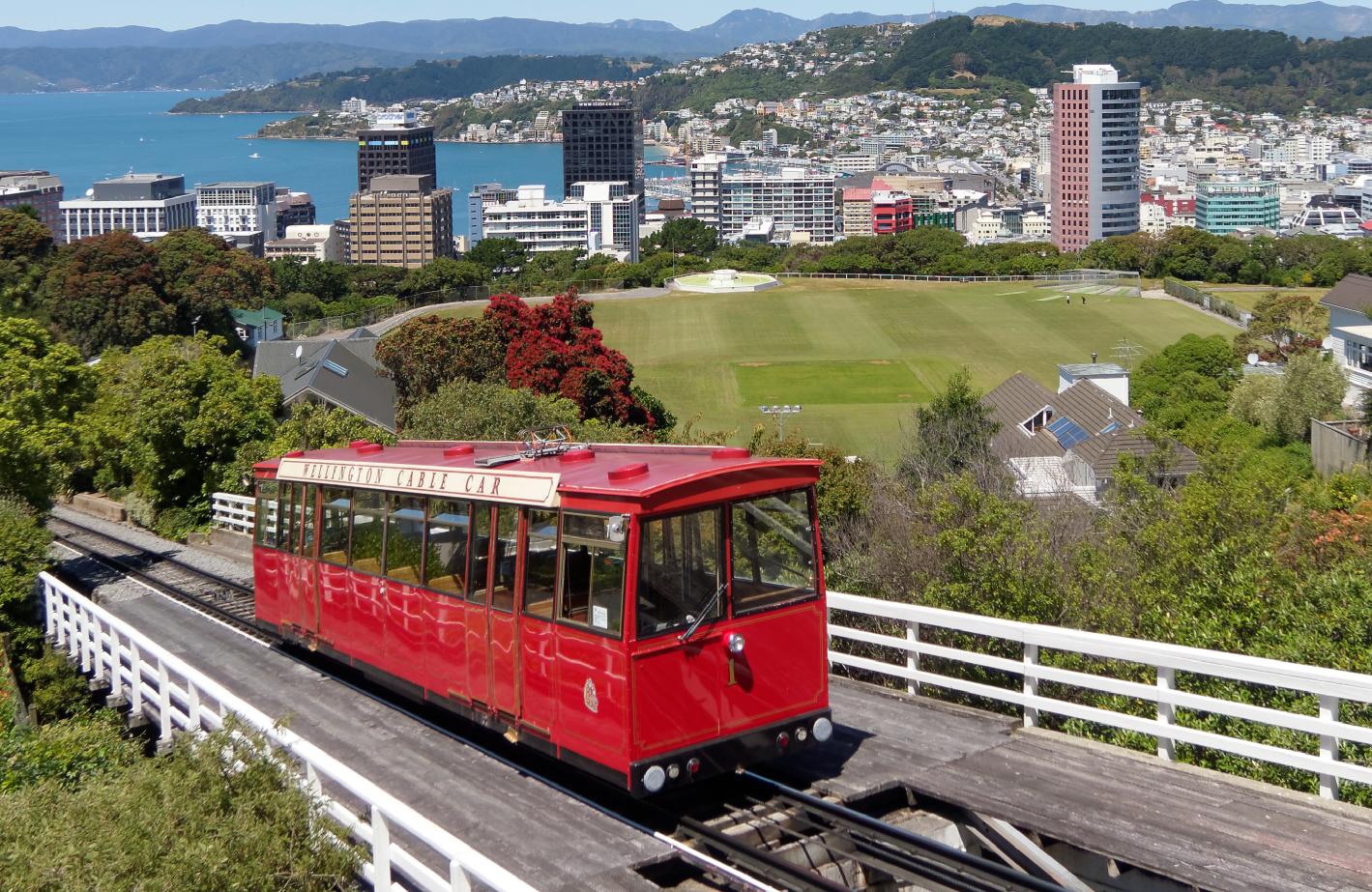
- From top left to bottom right: Matangi train at Paekākāriki station, Metlink bus on Taranaki Street, and the Wellington Cable Car

Overview
- Locale: Greater Wellington
- Transit type: Suburban rail, bus, funicular, ferry
- Annual ridership: 37.6 million (2023/24)
- Website: metlink.org.nz

Operation
- Operators: Tranzurban, Uzabus, NZ Bus, Mana Coach Services, Transdev Wellington, Wellington Cable Car Ltd, East by West Ferries

Public transport in the Wellington Region, branded under the name Metlink, is the public transport system serving Wellington and its surrounding region. It is the most used public transport system in New Zealand per capita, (Note: According to data from the Greater Wellington Regional Council, 90% of residents in the Wellington Region used public transport in the 2012/2013 fiscal year, equaling 72 public transport trips taken per capita. This compares with the Auckland Region's 47 and the Canterbury Region's 20 per capita trips taken.) and consists of electric and diesel buses, suburban trains, ferries and a funicular (Note: The funicular (Wellington Cable Car) is not a part of the Metlink branding, but is a form of transport in the Wellington Region.) (the Wellington Cable Car). It also included trams until 1964, and trolleybuses until 2017.

Buses and ferries are privately owned, with the infrastructure owned by public bodies, and public transport is often subsidised. The Greater Wellington Regional Council is responsible for planning and subsidising public transport, and pays around $30 million for bus and train services each year. The system covers Wellington City, Lower Hutt, Upper Hutt, Porirua, the Kāpiti Coast and the Wairarapa.

== System ==
=== Extent ===
The Regional Council's Regional Public Transport Plan notes that Wellington had in 2019:

- a rail network with around 83 multi-units and 24 carriages, which serve 48 stations.
- a bus network with 457 buses serving 3,179 stops on around 232 routes.
- two harbour ferries.
- a five-station funicular, the Cable Car.

GIS information indicates that 77% of the region's population lives within 800 metres of public transport stop with a 30-minute frequency or better.

Wellington's hilly terrain has a considerable effect on public transport. Some planners consider Wellington to be a "good" city for public transport management, as the topography concentrates settlement in valleys or along coastlines, providing clear, dense corridors for transport routes. At the same time, however, the hilly terrain proved a hindrance for the construction of rail and tram lines, and buses sometimes have difficulty on narrow and winding streets.

=== Usage ===
According to Metlink, over 40 million passenger trips were made by public transport in Wellington in 2018/2019, and this number has been growing in recent years. The Wellington Region has the highest per capita use of public transport in New Zealand, with 73.61 trips per capita in the year ending September 2019.

Of the approximately 37.33 million trips, around 24.33 million are made by bus, 12.80 million by train, and 0.18 million by ferry.

Year	Bus	Ferry	Rail	Total patronage
2001/02	19,795,687	114,163	10,163,061	30,072,911
2002/03	20,711,898	117,027	10,010,448	30,839,373
2003/04	21,338,606	127,110	9,953,408	31,419,124
2004/05	21,902,604	137,844	10,253,811	32,294,259
2005/06	23,487,552	155,799	11,097,423	34,740,774
2006/07	22,794,990	156,718	11,175,993	34,127,701
2007/08	22,964,384	177,128	11,552,453	34,693,965
2008/09	23,381,247	179,981	11,875,820	35,437,048
2009/10	23,647,840	182,034	11,133,677	34,963,551
2010/11	24,026,904	176,581	11,202,227	35,405,712
2011/12	24,111,291	176,698	11,274,141	35,562,130
2012/13	23,607,936	192,549	11,355,403	35,155,888
2013/14	23,981,194	180,155	11,643,292	35,804,641
2014/15	24,098,765	179,106	12,128,995	36,406,866
2015/16	24,331,408	197,889	12,801,182	37,330,479
2016/17	24,437,473	195,751	13,121,525	37,754,749
2017/18	24,716,617	204,209	13,552,866	38,473,692
2018/19^{[a]}	24,746,993	202,201	14,323,878	39,273,072
2019/20^{[b]}	21,335,320	165,382	11,489,110	32,989,812
2020/21	21,670,682	167,648	11,270,837	33,109,167
2021/22	17,654,506	137,424	8,133,999	25,925,929
2022/23	22,272,833	194,661	10,711,688	33,179,182

^{a} Patronage data from the 2018/19 year is not directly comparable with previous years, particularly for bus services, due to changes in the reporting method for statistics related to the implementation of new bus contracts in the region. Details may be found in the cited spreadsheet.

^{b} COVID-19 affected statistics for all modes from late March 2020

== Ticketing ==
Snapper cards pay for most services under Metlink, excluding ferries; and has been used on bus services since 2009; for trains, it was first introduced on the Johnsonville Line in 2021; and on the Hutt Valley Line, Kāpiti Line, Melling Branch and the Wairarapa Connection in November 2022. Tickets for single bus and train rides can still be purchased on board using cash.

Snapper cards are being replaced by the National Ticketing Solution, branded as Motu Move. This was expected to occur in 2026 for the Wellington Region, but was delayed until Q2 2027.

== Modes ==
=== Buses ===
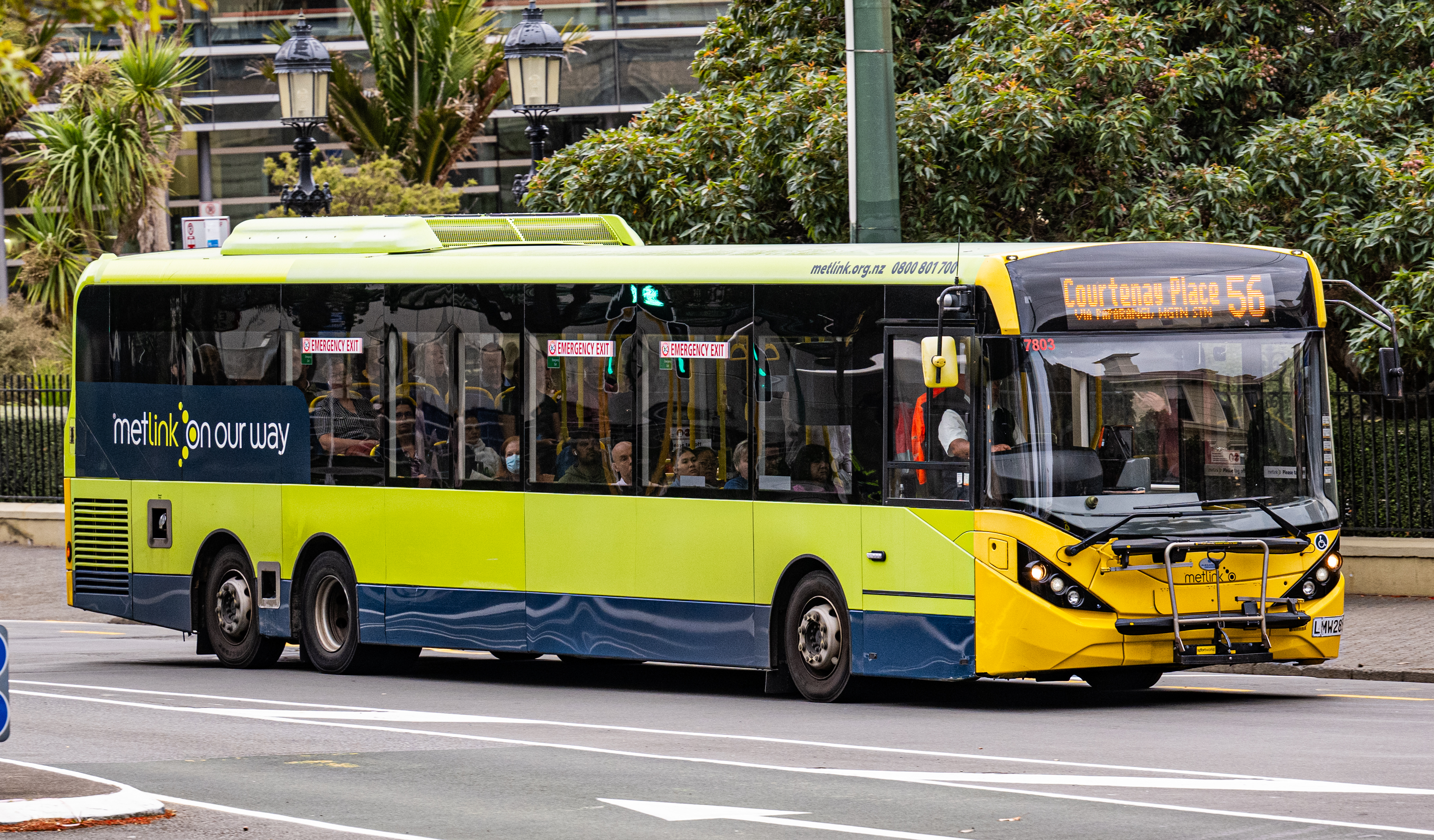
An Alexander Dennis Enviro200 XLB

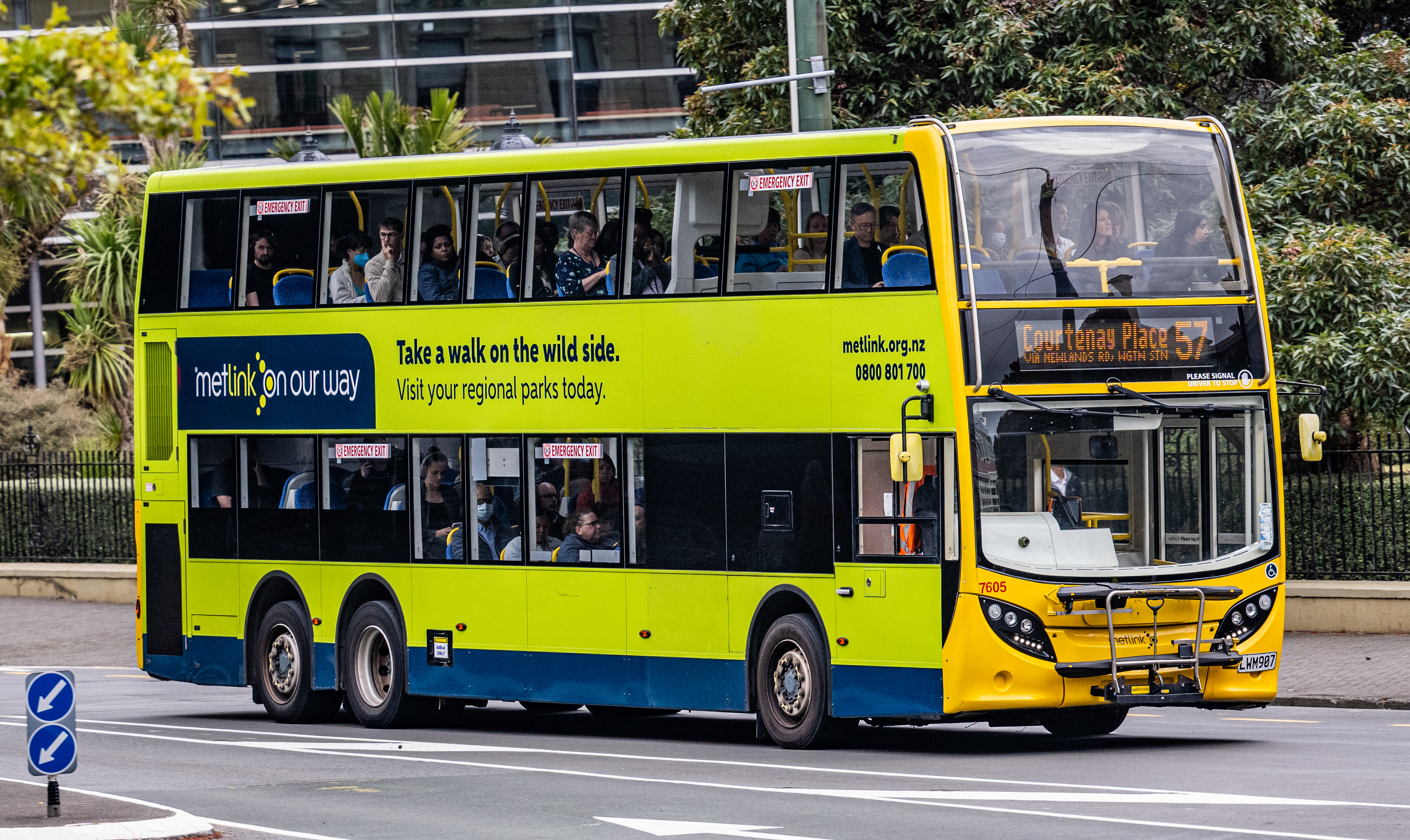
An Alexander Dennis Enviro500 MMC at Lambton Quay

Wellington has an extensive network of bus routes. The routes are determined by the Regional Council, which regulates commercially provided services and solicits bids from private operators to run the services it is prepared to subsidise.

From July 2018, the largest operator is Tranzit Group, which provides services for most of Wellington City, the Hutt Valley, and the Wairarapa under the Tranzurban brand. In Porirua and the Kāpiti Coast most services are provided by Uzabus. Other bus providers in the region include Mana Coach Services (owner of Newlands Coach Services) which provides services in the northern suburbs and Tawa, and NZ Bus which provides services from Eastbourne and the east-west spine between Karori and Miramar. Prior to July 2018, the largest operator was NZ Bus, which provided services for most of Wellington City under the GOWellington brand and for the Hutt Valley under the Valley Flyer and Runciman Motors brands. In Porirua and the Kāpiti Coast most services were provided by Mana Coach Services.

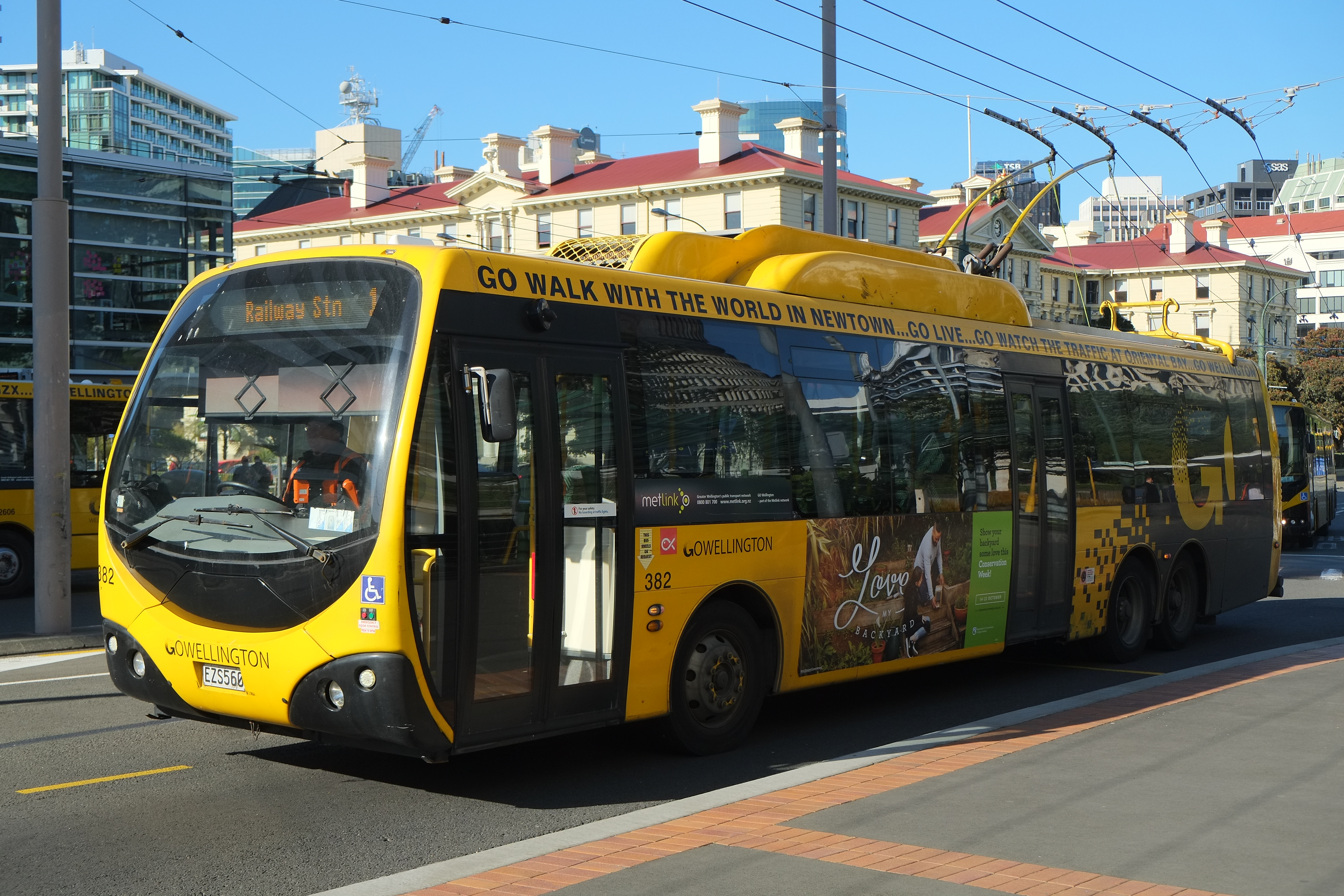
A trolley bus shortly before closure in 2017

The majority of buses in the Wellington area are powered by diesel, but GOWellington previously also had 60 trolleybuses that it operated within Wellington city. The trolleybus network was introduced between 1949 and 1964 to replace Wellington's trams (see below) and closed down in October 2017. From July 2018, Tranzit will introduce electric buses progressively onto their routes; the Greater Wellington Regional Council has also voted to look into proposals to make both rapid transport spines, Johnsonville to Island Bay and Karori to Seatoun, fully electric by 2021 and 2023 respectively and make a core route in both the Hutt Valley and Porirua fully electric as electric buses are introduced. As of April 2024, Wellington has 103 electric buses in urban service, the second highest electric fleet in New Zealand after Auckland which has 133 electric buses. Since 2018, new diesel buses on Metlink routes are required to be at least Euro V standard.

All Metlink buses accept the contactless Snapper card. As of April 2011, Wellington buses report real time location information which is displayed on electronic signs in some Wellington bus stops and can be viewed online.

From 2019, bike racks have been fitted to most buses operated in Metlink branding.

Tawa has five on-demand minibuses operated by Mana for a year's trial from 16 May 2022. Metlink plan to introduce five bendy buses to Wellington in 2027 for use on route 2 to deal with overcrowding. If successful, 29 more will be ordered.

=== Trains ===
Transdev Wellington operates Metlink's five-line 154-kilometre (96 mi) commuter network, which fans north out of Wellington railway station as far as Waikanae in the north and Masterton in the east. Transdev Wellington operates the service under contract to the Greater Wellington Regional Council with rolling stock (except for diesel locomotives used on the Wairarapa services) owned by the council, and rail infrastructure owned by KiwiRail. Until 2016 KiwiRail division Tranz Metro had the contract to operate Metlink's services.

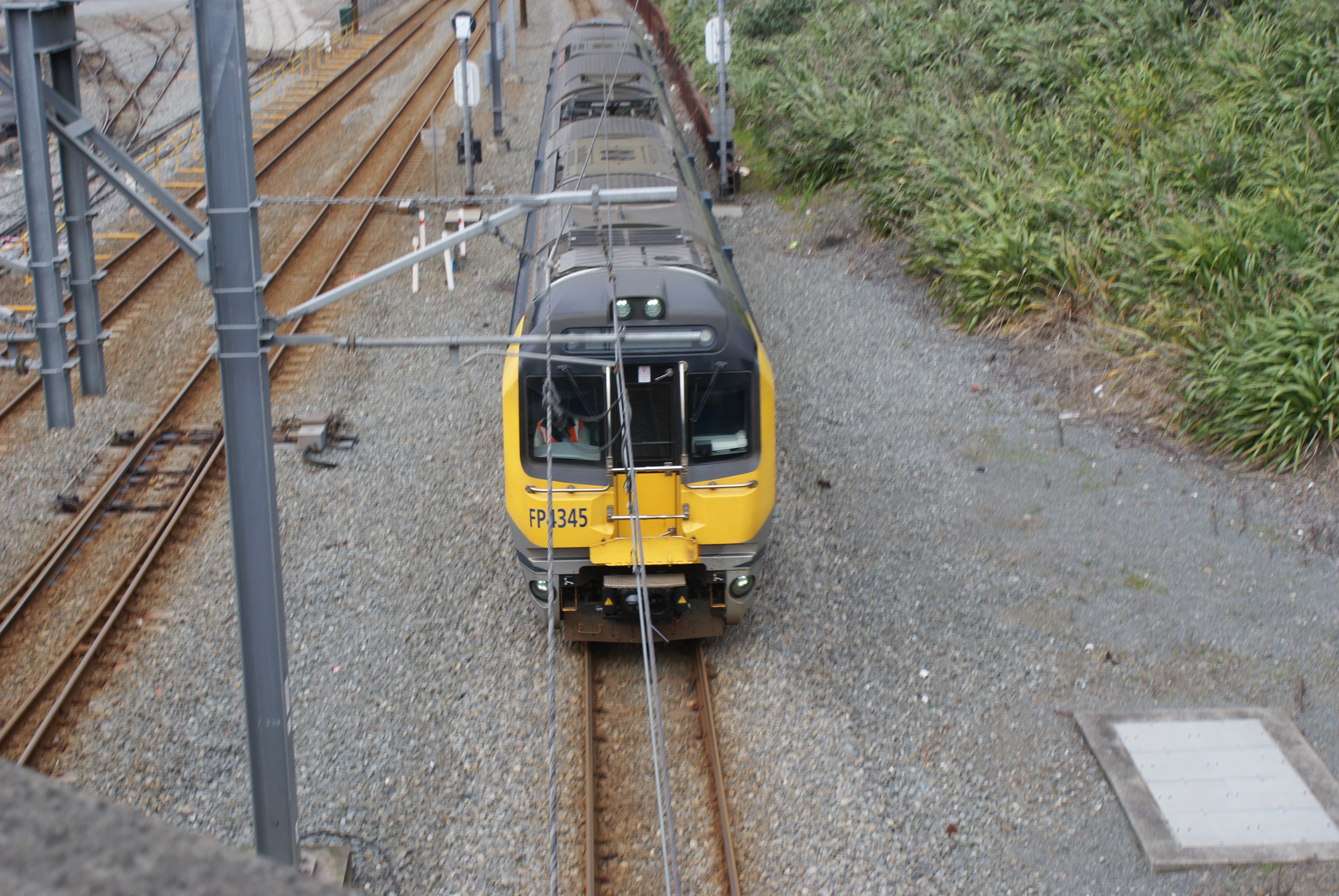
A Kāpiti Line train leaving the Wellington marshalling yards northward

Since July 2016, Wellington's commuter rail services have been operated by Transdev Wellington. Transdev subcontracts KiwiRail to provide and operate the diesel locomotives on the Wairarapa services. In the year ending 30 June 2017, 88.3% of rail services ran on time; this figure is lower than previous years, as timeliness is now measured directly by Metlink rather than relying on self-reporting by the operator, and is measured at all key stations rather than just Wellington Station.

There are two major rail corridors in Wellington. The North Island Main Trunk (NIMT) runs along the western coastline, passing through Porirua and Paraparaumu to Waikanae on the Kāpiti Coast (known as the Kāpiti Line); the Wairarapa Line runs along the edge of Wellington Harbour and then up the Hutt Valley, passing through both Lower and Upper Hutt (known as the Hutt Valley Line). Less frequent services continue through the rural Wairarapa, stopping at a number of small towns before terminating at Masterton. There are also the Johnsonville Line in the north of Wellington and the Melling Line on the western side of Lower Hutt. The Kāpiti Line and Hutt Valley Line are mostly double track, except for a short stretch on the Kāpiti Line between Muri and Paekākāriki (the North–South Junction) and between the Waikanae River and Waikanae station. The Johnsonville line is single track with passing loops, while the Melling lines is single track throughout.

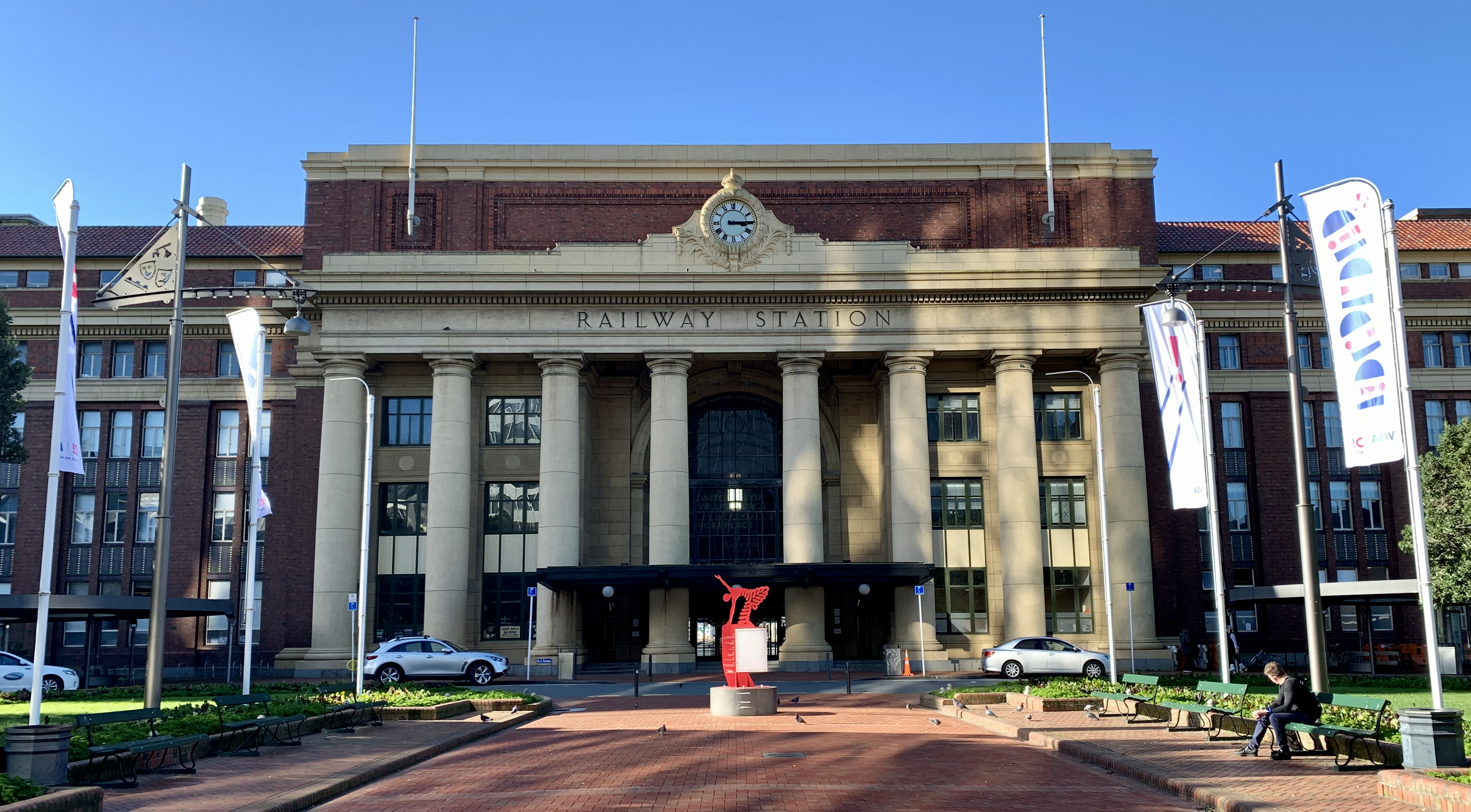
Wellington railway station in 2021

There are 49 stations in the rail network, all except Wellington railway station owned by Greater Wellington Regional Council. Wellington station is the busiest by far, with trains arriving and departing every few minutes at peak times. The next busiest stations are Porirua, Waterloo (in Lower Hutt) and Johnsonville. Most stations are served by only one line.

Most trains are the FP class Matangi electric multiple units, in sets of two to eight cars, introduced from 2011. They displaced the older DM class English Electric units, the last of which were withdrawn from service in 2012, and the EM class Ganz Mavag units, the last of which were withdrawn from service in 2016. The Wairarapa line beyond Upper Hutt is not electrified, so the Wairarapa Connection trains to Masterton are diesel-hauled with SW and SE class carriages.

There are long-distance trains to Palmerston North (the Capital Connection commuter train) and Auckland (the Northern Explorer). These are not part of the Wellington transport system.

The Capital Connection and the Wairarapa Connection are to be operated by Alstom as part of the regional network from 2030.

==== History ====
Electric suburban services began in July 1938, following the opening of the Tawa flat deviation of the North Island Main Trunk (NIMT). This significantly increased journey time across the Paparangi ridge, bypassing the older Johnsonville Line, the former route of the NIMT out of the capital. This was subsequently the first line to be electrified. By 1940 the NIMT (the present Kāpiti Line) had been electrified as far north as Paekākāriki.

The Hutt Valley Line was electrified to Taitā in 1953 to coincide with major state housing developments in the area. In 1954, the Wairarapa railway line was diverted between Petone and Haywards via Waterloo and Taitā, with the old line truncated to Melling to form the Melling Line. Electrification was extended to Upper Hutt in 1955.

Also in 1955, the 9 km Rimutaka Tunnel between Upper Hutt and Featherston opened, bypassing the laborious Rimutaka Incline and reducing the travel time from Wellington to Featherston to just over one hour, and from Wellington to Masterton to one-and-three-quarter hours. The Wairarapa Connection service started nine years later, after morning and afternoon peak services started to exceed the 176-seat capacity of the diesel railcars (twin NZR RM class) then used.

Electrification was extended to Paraparaumu in 1982, and to Waikanae in February 2011 to coincide with the arrival of the new Matangi electric multiple units. The (diesel-hauled) Capital Connection to Palmerston North also operates on this route.

In April 2023 the Wellington rail network faced "weeks" of delays because of 70 kph speed limits on all lines after rail evaluations by the "broken" track evaluation car had not been scheduled for May 2023, although the period was subsequently reduced to the week of May 1 to 5. These safety checks are due every four months. NZR has one track evaluation car; which required an annual inspection. The "repairs" required were restricted to turning of wheels.

==== Patronage ====
In 1983 the extension of electrification to Paraparaumu led to a rise in Wellington suburban rail passenger journeys to 13.6 million in 1983/84, higher than it had been for some years. But in the following decade there was a substantial decline, due to higher car ownership, more motorways and Government and corporate restructuring. There were only 8.5 million journeys in 1994/95 and 1995/96, though with a slow increase to in the late 1990s with high petrol prices to 10.0 million in 2000/01. This decline and with little interest by Tranz Rail (who had tried and failed to sell the Wellington operation in 2002) did not result in purchase of any new rolling stock after the Ganz-Mavag units in 1982. Most of the English Electric units were ordered in 1946 and were nearly 50 years old (although the earlier 38 & 42 units had been retired) and the 25 sets in use in 1990 had dropped to 14 in 2001. But their gradual retirement had to stop in the 1990s, and in 2004 refurbishment of 36 (later 37) cars at a cost of $5.4 million and taking from 2000 to 2008 was agreed. Some preserved sets were leased back; the Ferrymead, Phoenix and Cyclops sets.

But by 2006 the GWRC were concerned that trains were struggling to cope with increasing passenger numbers in peak hours, with an 11% increase in 2005/06 over the previous year. Toll Rail had no spare diesel locomotives with many used on increased Auckland demand for suburban commuter trains after the opening of the Britomart Centre. Therefore, the use of three EO locomotives surplus from the Otira Tunnel was agreed. Their new role from 2008 to 2011 was on the Kāpiti Line to Plimmerton and the Hutt Valley Line to Upper Hutt. Their slow acceleration meant that on the Hutt run stops at Pomare and Manor Park were omitted to keep to timetable. Two locos were used - 'topping and tailing' the trains. In 2011 some Melling trains were replaced by buses to release trains for the Hutt and Kapiti lines.

An average of 930,000 trips are made on Metlink trains each month. In 2013–14, Tranz Metro claimed 94.3% punctuality, being the proportion of trains arriving within five minutes of schedule (94.7% punctuality if normalised for the effects of the 2013 Seddon and 2013 Lake Grassmere earthquakes).

In 2024 it was reported that the passenger numbers had collapsed since 2020, with an increase in people working from home during and since the COVID-19 pandemic, particularly on Mondays and Fridays.

==== Services ====
The Metlink network consists of five lines totalling 160 kilometres (99 mi). All lines originate from Wellington railway station, at the northern end of the Wellington central business district. Around 101 kilometres (63 mi) of the network is electrified at 1800 V direct current with overhead lines (the voltage was increased to 1800 V from the nominal 1500 V when the Matangis fully took over in 2016, to increase the power transferred). The only part not electrified is the Wairarapa Line beyond Upper Hutt; as a result Wairarapa Connection trains are diesel-hauled.

Until 2001, Tranz Metro also operated the Capital Connection service between Palmerston North and Wellington. On the sale of 50% of Tranz Scenic to directors of the West Coast Railway (subsequently repurchased by Toll) it was transferred to Tranz Scenic (now KiwiRail Scenic), where it remains.

The five Metlink lines, from west to east, are:-

Line	Frequency		Calling at	Notes
Line	Mon–Fri	Sat–Sun	Calling at	Notes
Johnsonville (JVL)	2 per hour		Wellington, Crofton Downs, Ngaio, Awarua Street, Simla Crescent, Box Hill, Khandallah, Raroa, Johnsonville	
Kapiti (KPL)	3 per hour	2 per hour	Wellington, Takapu Road, Redwood, Tawa, Linden, Kenepuru, Porirua, Paremata, Mana, Plimmerton, Pukerua Bay, Paekākāriki, Paraparaumu, Waikanae	Some peak services begin/end at Porirua or Plimmerton
Hutt Valley (HVL)	3 per hour	2 per hour	Wellington, Ngauranga, Petone, Ava, Woburn, Waterloo, Epuni, Naenae, Wingate, Taitā, Pomare, Manor Park, Silverstream, Heretaunga, Trentham, Wallaceville, Upper Hutt	Some peak services begin/end at Taitā
Melling (MEL)	1 per hour	no service	Wellington, Ngauranga, Petone, Western Hutt, Melling	
Wairarapa Connection (WRL)	5 per day	2 per day	Wellington, Petone, Waterloo, Upper Hutt, Maymorn, Featherston, Woodside, Matarawa, Carterton, Solway, Renall Street, Masterton	

==== Rolling stock ====
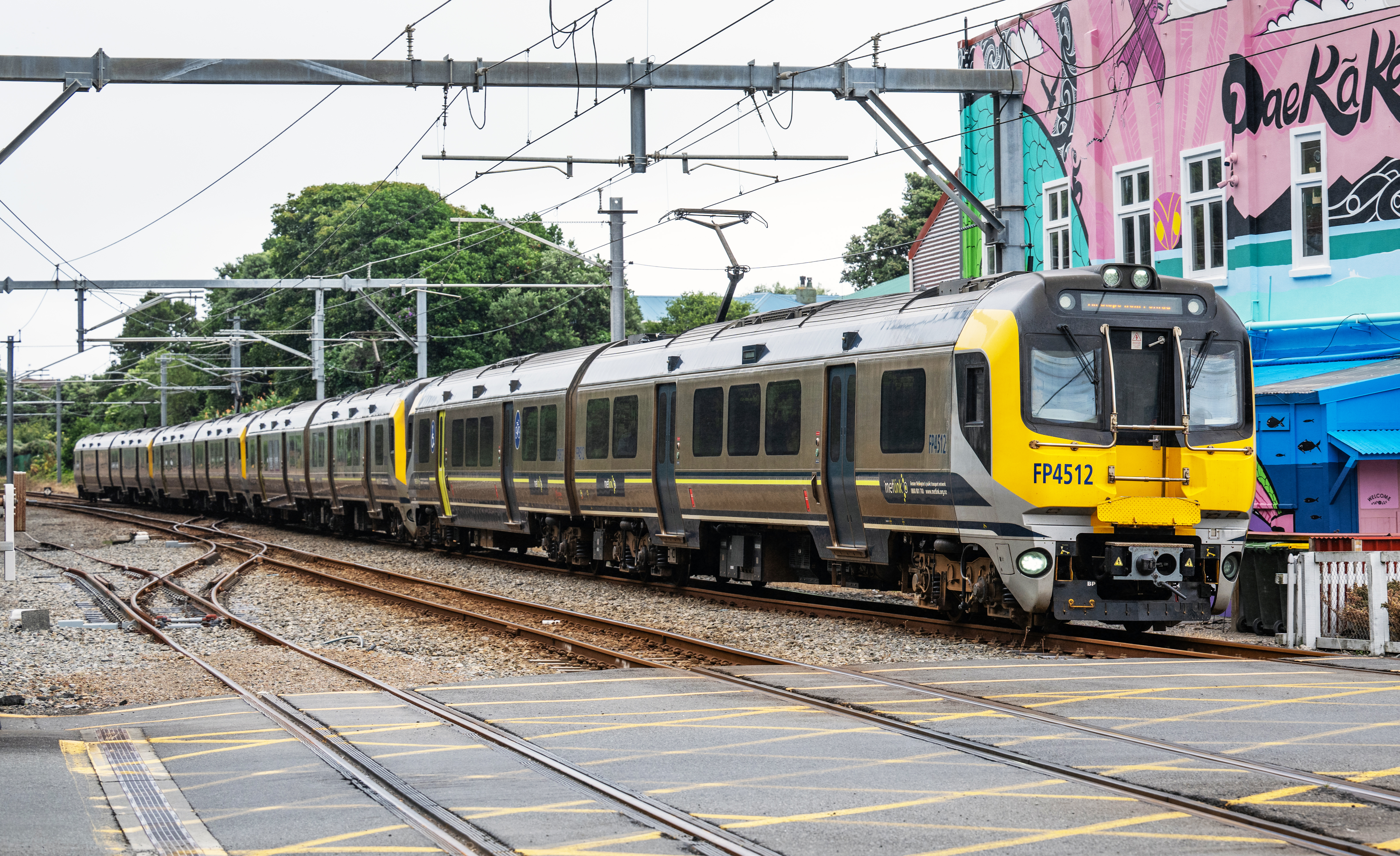
An FP class (Matangi) electric multiple unit at Paekākāriki

Metlink's rolling stock consists of electric multiple units and diesel locomotive-hauled carriages. Electric locomotive-hauled trains were withdrawn in 1988 on the retirement of the EW class electric locomotives, displaced by the EM/ET class "Ganz Mavag" units introduced in 1982. DM/D class "English Electric" units have been withdrawn as they became uneconomical to operate. Several DM/D units were kept for peak services and the Johnsonville Line, where the loading gauge and braking capacity prevented the EM/ET units operating.

New carriages were introduced to the Capital Connection in 1998 and the Wairarapa Connection in 2007. They are ex-British Rail Mark 2 carriages, re-gauged and refurbished. They replaced NZR 56-foot carriages built between 1937 and 1943.

In July 2007, GWRC ordered 48 FP/FT "Matangi" units to increase capacity and replace the remainder of the 70-year-old DM/D units. The Johnsonville Line was upgraded in 2008 and 2009 to accommodate the Matangi units.

In 2008, several DM/D units were reintroduced on peak services as an interim measure until the Matangi units arrived. Six SE BR Mark 2 carriages were partially refurbished and introduced for express peak services, top-and-tailed by two refurbished EO class electric locomotives. The locomotives, built in 1968, were used in the Otira Tunnel until its de-electrification in 1997. An additional locomotive was refurbished for backup. Due to mechanical issues and the availability of new rolling stock, the EOs were withdrawn from service in 2011.

On 25 June 2012, the last DM/D units were withdrawn from service, just one week shy of 74 years since the first members of the class entered service. The SE carriages formerly used with the EO electric locomotives were fitted with toilets and reallocated to the Wairarapa Connection in July 2013 to ease rolling stock constraints.

In June 2013, GWRC decided to purchase 35 additional Matangi units instead of refurbishing the EM/ET units. The last EM/ET units were withdrawn on 27 May 2016 after 34 years in service.

KiwiRail provides four diesel-electric locomotives on a "hook-and-tow" basis to operate the Wairarapa Connection trains. Since July 2015, services have been hauled by the DFT class; before then, the DC class was primarily used.

Similarly the Capital Connection to Palmerston North in the Manawatū-Whanganui Region is diesel-hauled.

Class	Image	Type	Top speed		Number	Carriages	Routes operated	Built
Class	Image	Type	km/h	mph	Number	Carriages	Routes operated	Built
DFB Class		Diesel Locomotive	113	70	3	N/A	Wairarapa Connection (KiwiRail provides four diesel-electric locomotives on a "hook-and-tow" basis)	1979–81
SE Coaches		Passenger carriage	100	62	6	3-8	Wairarapa Connection (KiwiRail provides four diesel-electric locomotives on a "hook-and-tow" basis)	1973–75 (introduced in 2008)
SW Coaches		Passenger carriage	100	62	24	3-8	Wairarapa Connection (KiwiRail provides four diesel-electric locomotives on a "hook-and-tow" basis)	1973–75 (introduced in 2006)
FP/FT Matangi		EMU	110	68	83	2	Kāpiti Line, Hutt Valley Line, Melling Branch, Johnsonville Branch	2008–2012, 2014–2016

==== Future ====
The 2013 Review and Draft 2014 Review of the Wellington Regional Public Transport Plan confirmed that building additional stations on the Kāpiti Line at Raumati and Lindale was no longer recommended, with the cost of new stations outweighing the benefits. The detailed analysis for Raumati (which was a "viability benchmark" for other new stations) said that the modelled peak-hour patronage needed to be about 300 new passengers to justify a new station, and that most Raumati users would have switched from Paraparaumu Station. Network extensions beyond the current Metlink rail operation limits would be by "shuttles or non-electrified services" running to Wellington. This followed a campaign to extend electrified commuter services to Otaki, following the extension of the Kāpiti Line to Waikanae in 2011.

Service improvements proposed in May 2017 are double-tracking the line between Trentham and Upper Hutt; a third-platform or passing loop at Porirua Station; and a "turnback" point at Plimmerton Station so that trains can continue in the opposite direction without using a turnaround point. These will ease peak-hour congestion and allow increased trains at busy times. However, they are regarded by KiwiRail as "service enhancements" rather than renewals/maintenance which KiwiRail would pay for, so the GWRC is seeking taxpayer funding towards the $30 million cost before inclusion in the 2017-18 Annual Plan as Rail Scenario 1. Immediate work required first is the replacement of some traction poles on the Hutt Line.

From July 2018, the Hutt Valley and Kapiti lines will run every twenty minutes off-peak on weekdays rather than half-hourly.

In 2019/20, the GWRC is to "renew" the Crofton Downs, Featherston, Silverstream, Wallaceville and Trentham (outer) railway stations.

The Greater Wellington Regional Council endorsed a Wellington Rail Programme Business case for a 30-year programme for regional rail system which included increased rail services as follows, but apparently depends on further government investment., and was to go to Waka Kotahi for endorsement; according to a statement of 1 July 2022:

Train frequency will be able to progressively improve as infrastructure is improved. Peak train services on the Hutt and Kāpiti lines would be increased in 2025 to four trains per hour, along with improved longer distance services to Masterton and Palmerton North by 2028. The peak service frequency is proposed to step up to six trains per hour (every 10 minutes) on the Hutt and Kāpiti lines by 2032, along with inter-peak services increasing to four trains per hour. The Kāpiti line is expected to further improve to 10 trains per hour during the peak by the mid 2030’s, and the Hutt Line by early 2040’s.

==== Replacement of diesel-hauled trains ====
New Tūhono trains are to replace the present trains from 2030.

For several years the Greater Wellington Regional Council has put forward proposals to replace the diesel-hauled Capital Connection to Palmerston North and the Wairarapa Connection to Masterton with Dual or Bi-mode trains which would operate on overhead electric power to Waikanae and Upper Hutt respectively, and then on diesel or battery power.

In 2017 it was proposed to run additional Wairarapa trains and upgrade the Wairarapa Line. Funding for new electro-diesel multiple units were included in a $990 million funding bid to NZTA in 2018.

In 2019, the GWRC proposed replacing the Capital Connection and Wairarapa Connection trains with 15 four-car bi-mode multiple units by 2025. These trains were estimated to cost $415 million.

In May 2020, GWRC received $5m in funding from the NZTA to write a business case and commence procurement for replacement rolling stock on Wairarapa Line services and the "Manawatū Line." A fleet of 15 four-car Multiple Units is envisaged. However proposals to the government from 2019 to 2022 have not received funding.

In 2022 the GWRC was progressing a business case with the government for $3-$4 billion electric regional trains to tackle population growth. In 2023 the GWRC again proposed "railcars" for the Wairarapa and Palmerston North services at a capital cost of $874 million, including station upgrades and service/maintenance depots. 88 "trimode" units (i.e. 22 four-car units) are proposed; the present Wairarapa Connection is expected to reach capacity in 2025, and would have peak services increased from three to six each weekday morning and afternoon. The Capital Connection is expected to reach capacity in 2030.

In April 2023 it was announced that 18 four-car trains will be ordered to replace the Wairarapa Connection and Capital Connection rolling stock on passenger services from Wellington to Masterton and Palmerston North with 18 tri-mode consists, following a request for 22 tri-mode consists from the GWRC. The tri-mode consists will have 250 seats and 4 wheelchair spaces per consist, and will operate on battery or diesel power beyond the electrification limits of Upper Hutt or Waikanae In September 2023 it was announced that WSP would be the "procurement partner" for the hybrid trains. By 21 February 2024 a "satisfactory number" of Expressions of Interest had been received for the new trains. It is hoped that contracts will be signed in 2025, the first train will arrive in 2028 and a full service will be running in 2030.

In 2024 the Greater Wellington Regional Council (who will manage the process) and Horizons Regional Councils agreed with the government to enter into design, build and maintain contracts for 18 new four-car sets to replace the present 50-year old ex-British Rail carriages. The three short-listed tenderers are Alstom, CAF and Stadler, for a tender to be let in 2025 and operating from 2029 for 35 years. The trains could be hybrids with diesel engines and capable of charging batteries on electrified track; and on the Wairarapa Line could operate at up to 110 km/h not the present 90 km/h. Funding will include a maintenance depot at Masterton, station improvements north of Waikanae and Upper Hutt and a second platform at Maymorn, plus new passing loops on both lines.

In September 2025, Alstom won the tender to deliver the new 18 train-sets, known as Tūhono (meaning to connect or unite), which will be built in India, to operate from 2030 (the first train and maintenance contract by Alstom in New Zealand). This will double the current service, and include four return journeys between Wellington and Palmerston North. They are to be battery-electric, as used in Europe and Japan (not hybrids with a diesel engine). A maintenance facility in Masterton with 30 staff will be constructed. The government will fund 90% of the cost or $800.2m; $455.3m from Crown funding and $347.5m from the National Land Transport Fund. The rest will be funded by the Horizons Regional Council and the Greater Wellington Regional Council.

=== Ferries ===
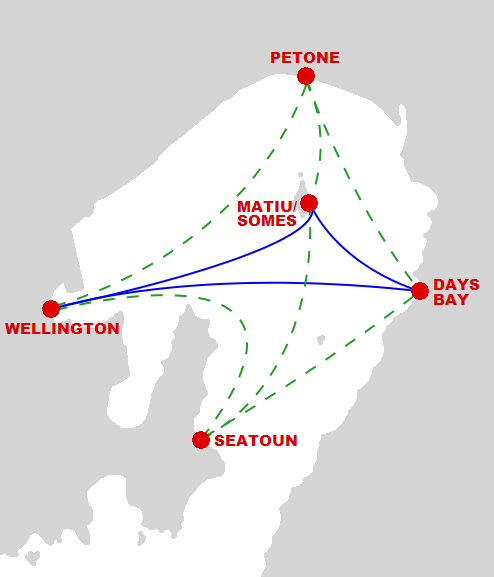
Blue ferry services run every day, green services are weekend-only.

Only the western and northern shores of Wellington Harbour are heavily populated, and the trip between these population centres is often as quick along the coast as it is by water: demand for ferries has been lower than might otherwise be expected. Two ferry routes are operated by East by West, a private company: daily between central Wellington and Days Bay on the eastern coast, near Eastbourne, serving Seatoun at peak times from 3 April 2008; and the Harbour Explorer Excursion at weekends, also serving Seatoun. Off-peak and weekend sailings call at Matiu / Somes Island, a nature reserve.

Historically ferries also served Miramar, Karaka Bay, and Eastbourne proper. These routes were discontinued as road connections around the region improved. After the 2016 Kaikōura earthquake, weekend services to Petone temporarily ceased due to wharf damage.

There are also larger road and rail ferries that cross Cook Strait to Picton in the South Island; See Interislander. These are not part of Wellington's public transport system.

=== Cable Car ===
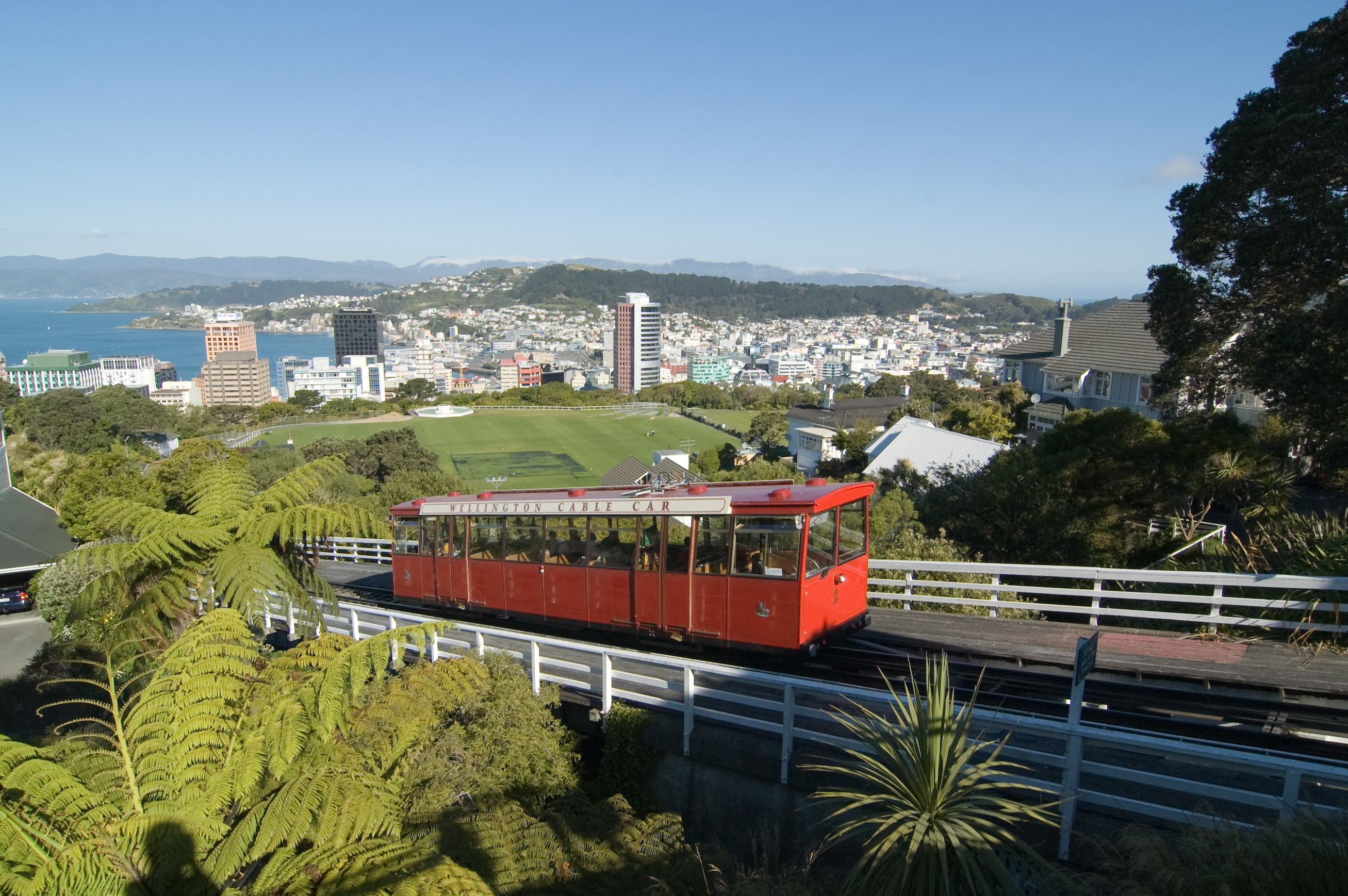
Wellington Cable Car

The Wellington Cable Car runs between the central city and the hill suburb of Kelburn. It is used by commuters travelling to and from work, by people travelling from the city to the Wellington Botanic Garden, and by students at Victoria University.

Despite its name, it is a funicular with two counterbalanced cars permanently attached to each other by a cable, rather than a true cable car, where the cars grip or release the cable as needed. The cable runs through a pulley at the top of the hill, driven by an electric motor. Originally the cable car was a hybrid between a true cable car and a funicular, but retained its name when it was converted to a full funicular.

It is owned and operated by Wellington Cable Car Ltd, a wholly owned subsidiary of Wellington City Council. Until 2007 it was operated under contract by Transfield Services, a private company. Unlike most other public transport in Wellington, it runs without subsidy.

=== Trams (historic) ===
Between 1878 and 1964, Wellington had trams serving the western, eastern and southern suburbs, with the northern suburbs served by trains. The trams were replaced by buses or trolleybuses, although occasional calls are made for light rail to be reintroduced.

=== Light rail ===
Following the 2010 mayoral elections, Mayor Celia Wade-Brown pledged to investigate light rail between Wellington Station and the Airport. Mayor Justin Lester reaffirmed his support for light rail along the golden mile in 2018.

After the 2023 Elections, The 54th New Zealand Parliament and regional councils decided to scrap the Lets Get Wellington Moving plan, which included light rail.
