= Heretaunga railway station =

Railway station in New Zealand

Heretaunga
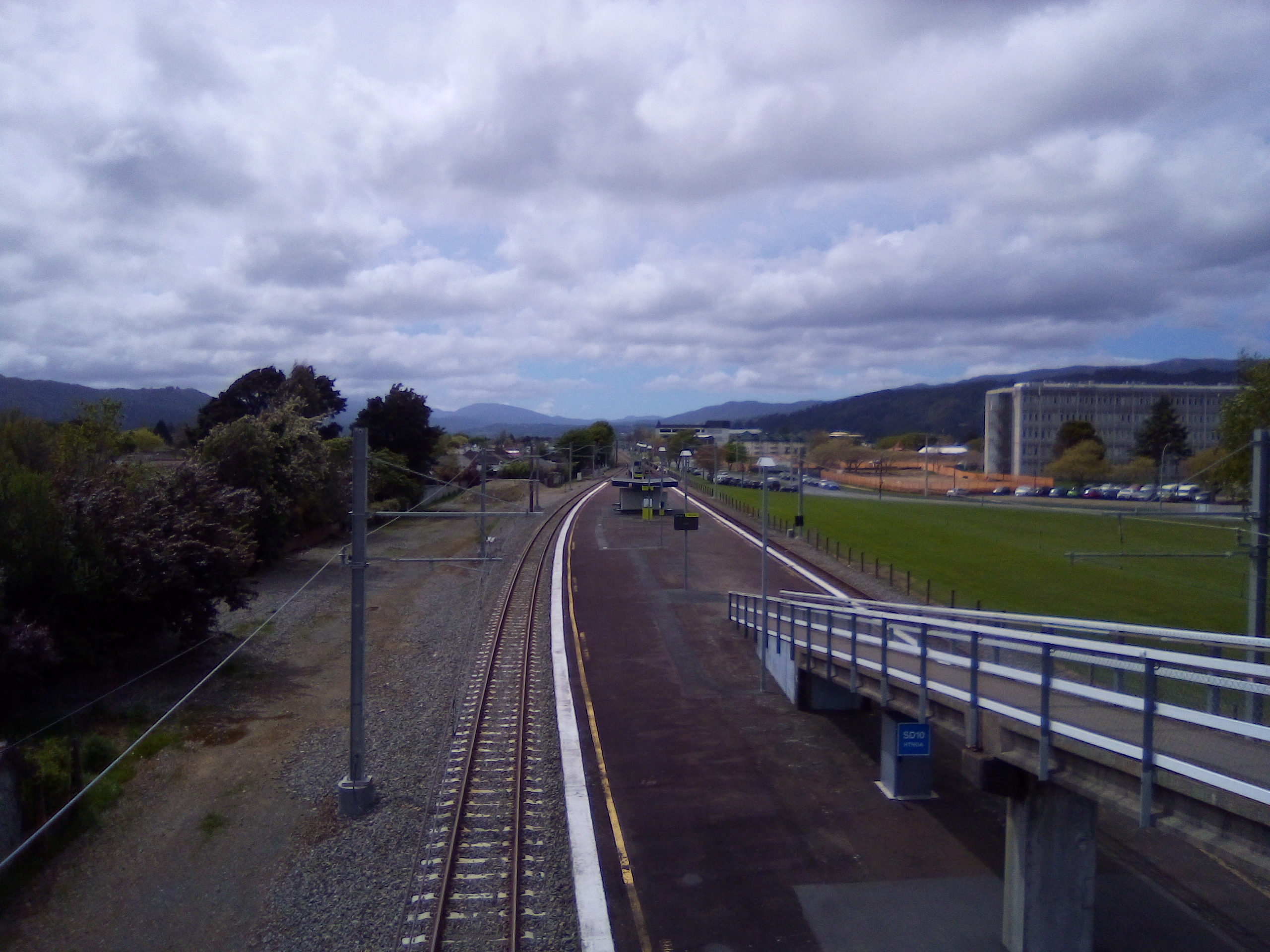
- Heretaunga station in 2021

General information
- Location: Bathurst Street, Heretaunga, Upper Hutt, New Zealand
- Coordinates: 41°08′32″S 175°01′33″E
- System: Metlink suburban rail
- Owner: Greater Wellington Regional Council
- Line: Hutt Valley Line
- Platforms: Island
- Tracks: Main line (2)

Construction
- Parking: Yes
- Cycle facilities: ?

Other information
- Station code: HERE
- Fare zone: 6

History
- Opened: 1908; 118 years ago
- Electrified: 24 July 1955; 71 years ago

Services
Preceding station	Transdev Wellington	Following station
Trentham towards Upper Hutt	Hutt Valley Line	Silverstream towards Wellington
Location

Heretaunga railway station is a suburban railway station serving Heretaunga in Upper Hutt, New Zealand. The station is located on the Hutt Valley section of the Wairarapa Line, 28.2 km (17.5 mi) north of Wellington. The station is served by Metlink's electric multiple unit trains of the "Matangi" FP class. Trains stopping at Heretaunga run to Wellington and Upper Hutt.

The station has an island platform between two tracks, linked by pedestrian overbridges to Bathurst Street and Maadi Place in the south, and pedestrian level crossings to Marion Street and Somme Road in the north.

== History ==
The station was opened in 1908.

From 1941 to 1954, the Trentham Army Camp had a set of railway sidings used for freight and for troop trains, with a shunting locomotive owned by the Army. Most of the track were removed in the 1970s. The siding was 0.63 km from Heretaunga railway station and 0.53 km from Trentham railway station.
