= Upper Hutt railway station =

Railway station in New Zealand

Upper Hutt
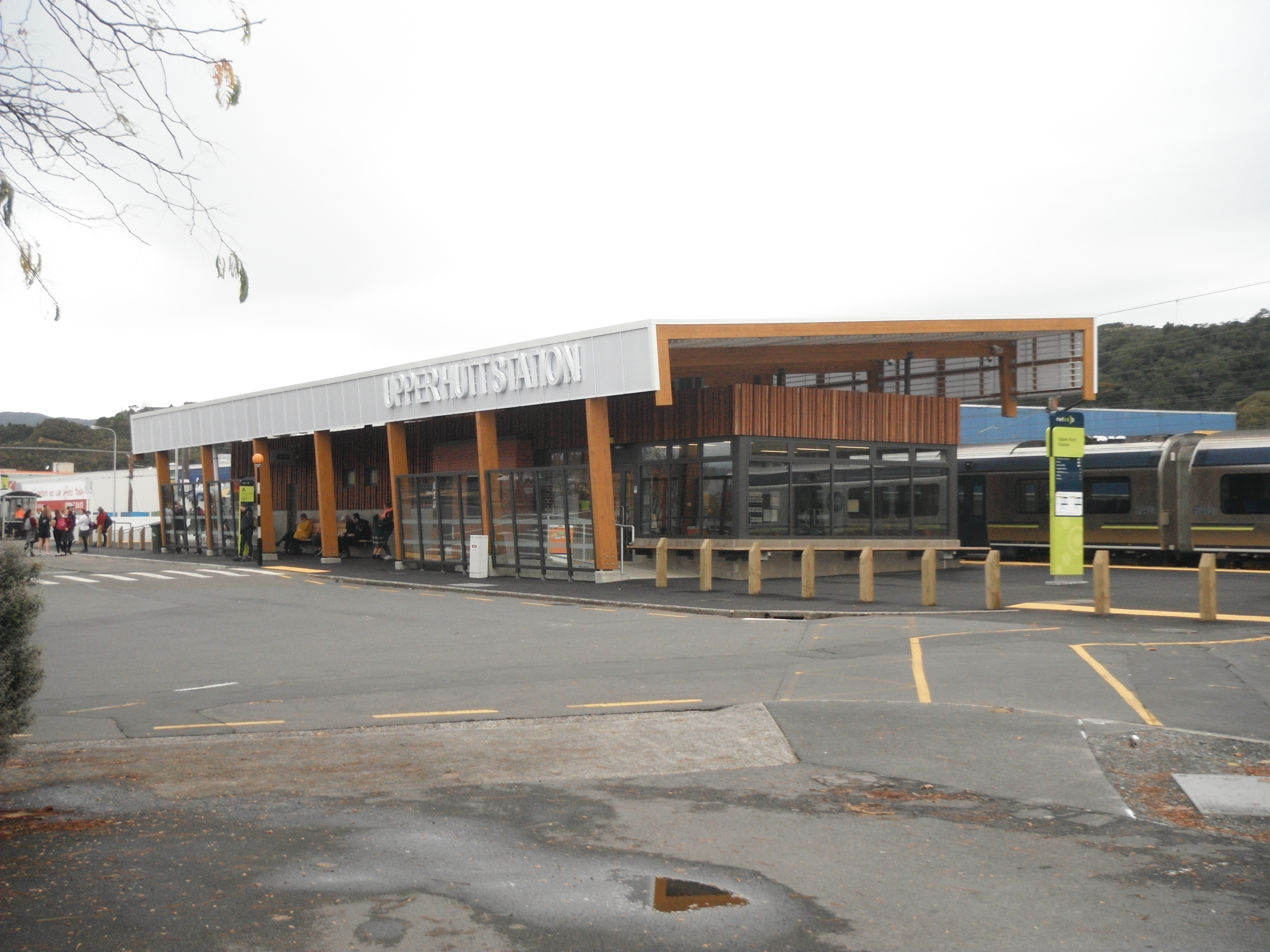
- Rebuilt Upper Hutt railway station, May 2016

General information
- Location: Station Crescent, Upper Hutt, New Zealand
- Coordinates: 41°7′34.11″S 175°4′13.77″E
- System: Metlink suburban rail
- Owner: Greater Wellington Regional Council
- Line: Wairarapa Line
- Platforms: Single, Island with bay platform (southern end)
- Tracks: Main lines: 1 Crossing loops: 1 Sidings: 1 (Bay Platform); Row sidings: 5 (EMU storage in fenced area); Private sidings: 1 (to Parapine)
- Connections: Bus services

Construction
- Parking: Yes
- Cycle facilities: Yes
- Accessible: y

Other information
- Station code: UPPE (Metlink); UPH (KiwiRail Network)
- Fare zone: 7

History
- Opened: 1 February 1876; 150 years ago
- Rebuilt: 1955; 71 years ago 2015; 11 years ago
- Electrified: 24 July 1955; 71 years ago

Services
Preceding station	Transdev Wellington	Following station
Terminus	Hutt Valley Line	Wallaceville towards Wellington
Maymorn towards Masterton	Wairarapa Connection	Waterloo towards Wellington
Location
Notes
- Previous Station: Wallaceville Station; Next Station (original): Mangaroa Station; Next Station (current): Maymorn Station

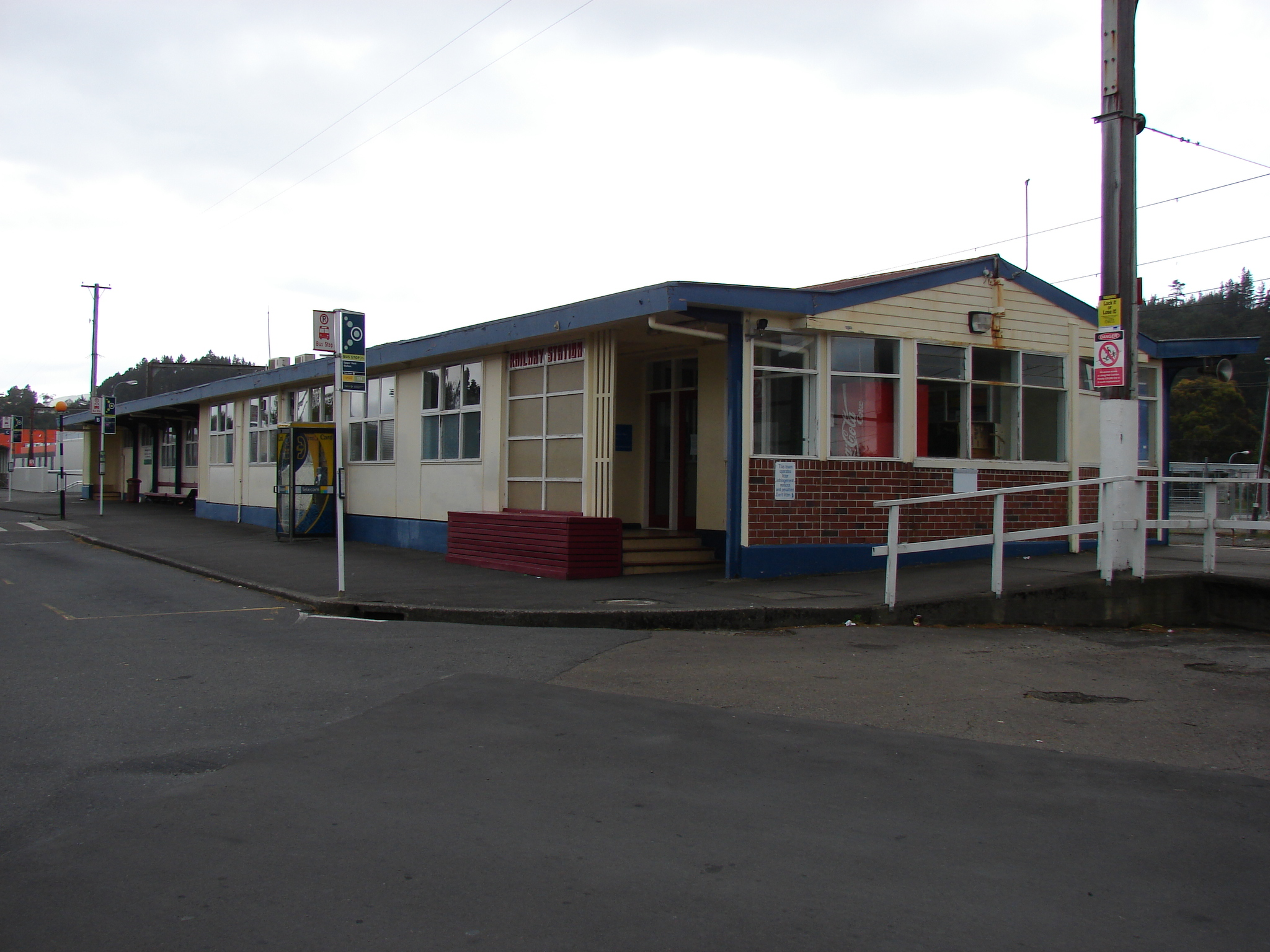
The previous Upper Hutt station building, pictured in 2007.

Upper Hutt railway station is a suburban railway station serving central Upper Hutt, New Zealand. The station is on the Wairarapa Line, 32.4 km (20.1 mi) north of Wellington, and is served by Transdev Wellington on behalf of the Greater Wellington Regional Council. The station is the northern terminus for the electrified Hutt Valley Line to and from Wellington. The diesel-hauled Wairarapa Connection stops at Upper Hutt on its route between Wellington and Masterton.

The station opened with the line from Wellington in February 1876, and was substantially rebuilt in 1955 with electrification to Upper Hutt. In 2015, the station was upgraded with a new station building and refurbished platforms. The station has two platforms, a side platform on the main line and a bay platform on a spur off the main line. Overnight storage of electric multiple units is provided in fenced sidings adjacent to the station.

As part of the 2020-2021 Wellington Metro Rail Upgrade with double tracking of the single track section from Trentham to Upper Hutt (as proposed in the 2011 – 2012 Regional Rail Plan (RRP) and completed in November 2011 handling of two trains at the same time will be improved by adding two new crossovers from the main platform to the inner loop track (there is also a second or outer loop track). The inner loop track will be extended to the north with a new north end crossover to it so that long Wairarapa log trains can be ”parked” out of the way of passenger trains.

== History ==
Construction of the Wairarapa Line to Upper Hutt was covered by the River Contract, which was let to contractor Charles McKirdy. The rails reached Upper Hutt in January 1876. Severe flooding at the end of January caused the road between Upper Hutt and Taita to become blocked and damaged, and so to minimise the impact caused by delays to road traffic, the Upper Hutt station was opened on 1 February, despite the concerns of the Public Works Department that the move was premature. The station was not ready for business, as the station and ancillary buildings had not been completed. However, the line and station were handed over to the Provincial Council to run while construction of the line beyond Upper Hutt commenced.

With the line open as far as Upper Hutt, traffic began to increase. Goods traffic initially consisted mostly of timber, followed closely by wool. Passenger services consisted of three weekday return services to Wellington. One effect of the introduction of services between Wellington and Upper Hutt was the reduction in road coach services, which, from the north, terminated at Upper Hutt. Goods wagons, however, continued on to Wellington. Still, railway traffic benefited by a 50% increase due to the establishment of the railhead at Upper Hutt.

The year the station opened, it gained a fourth-class station building, goods shed, coal store, an engine shed and two water tanks for the sum of £2,040. In 1955, as part of the station upgrading programme for the imminent arrival of electric multiple unit working of the Hutt Valley Line, a new station building was erected at Upper Hutt.

While trains only operated as far north as Upper Hutt, they were not protected by fixed signals. It was felt that as services were few, slow, and operated only in daylight hours, signals were not necessary. Upper Hutt was one of the first stations on the Wairarapa Line to receive signals, with initial instructions requiring south-bound trains to wait in the siding or loop, and north-bound trains to take the main line. These signals were first listed in the working timetables of 1887. By 1921, increased traffic was causing operational issues, and it was decided to install new automatic signalling which had been recently developed in the United States. Work began in 1921, and by early 1923 was operating between Wellington and Upper Hutt.

In 1955, with the opening of the Rimutaka Tunnel and deviation, a Centralised Traffic Control system was installed at Upper Hutt station to control main line points and signals between Trentham and Featherston inclusive. However, only one crossover (18) and four signals (8, 23, 23A and 29) at Trentham could be controlled from Upper Hutt; the remainder, which were typically only used on race days at the adjacent Trentham Racecourse, were controlled by a panel at Trentham itself. The semaphore signals were replaced with three-colour searchlight signals. On 6 February 2007, the Upper Hutt signal box was decommissioned and control of the line from Trentham to Featherston was moved to Train Control in central Wellington.

All locomotive hauled passenger trains between Wellington and Upper Hutt were replaced with electric multiple units from 24 July 1955.

=== 2015 rebuild ===
Greater Wellington Regional Council adopted the regional public transport plan in June 2014 that includes a provision for the upgrade of Upper Hutt station.

Work rebuilding the station commenced on 5 January 2015, starting with upgrading the platform south of the station building. The platform was resealed, services upgraded, and two "butterfly" shelters were installed. The ticket office and staff facilities moved to portable buildings on 11 May 2015, coinciding with the completion of the platform work. Work on asbestos removal started shortly afterwards in preparation for demolition.

The new station opened in December 2015.

In 2016 the provision of 94 additional parking places was announced at a cost of $550,000; an increase from 228 to 322 places.

== Services ==
=== Rail ===
Metlink operates Hutt Valley Line electric suburban services between Wellington and Upper Hutt. It also operates the Wairarapa Connection diesel-hauled service between Wellington and Masterton via Upper Hutt. The basic daytime off-peak timetable is:

- 3 tph to Wellington, stopping all stations
- Two Wairarapa Connection services to Wellington, stopping Waterloo and Petone only.
- Two Wairarapa Connection services to Masterton, stopping all stations.

The basic morning peak timetable is:

- 3 tph to Wellington, stopping all stations to Taita then Waterloo only.
- Three Wairarapa Connection services to Wellington, stopping Waterloo and Petone only.

=== Bus ===
Metlink bus routes 110 (Petone to Emerald Hill), 111 (to Totara Park), 113 (to Riverstone Terraces), 112 (to Te Mārua), 114 (to Trentham via Poets Block) and 115 (to Pinehaven) serve Upper Hutt station.

== Gallery ==
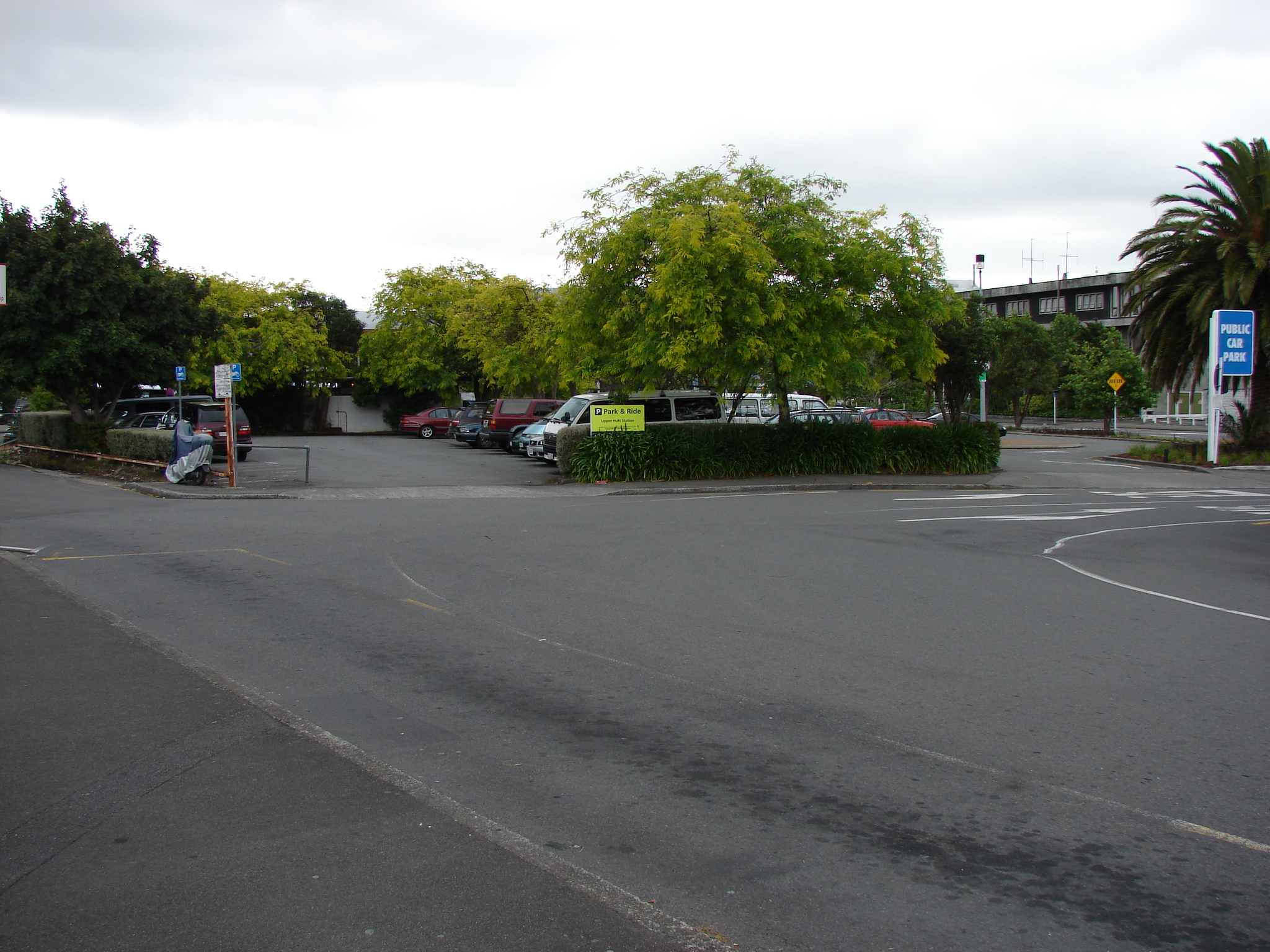
Upper Hutt railway station car park.

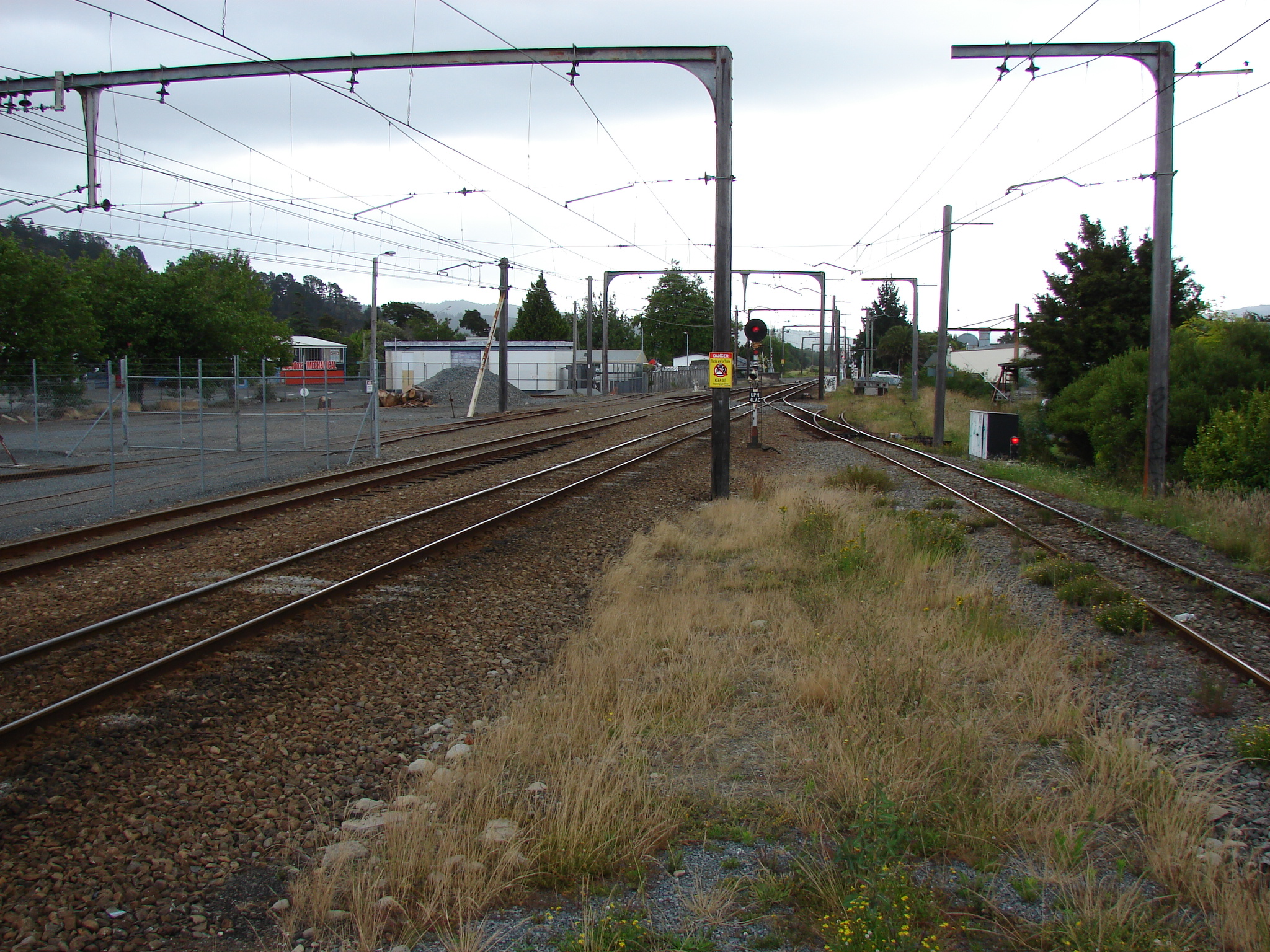
Looking south from Upper Hutt station platform. The dock is to the right, the main line to the left of the platform, and the crossing loop at far left. To the left of the crossing loop is the southern entrance to the EMU storage area.

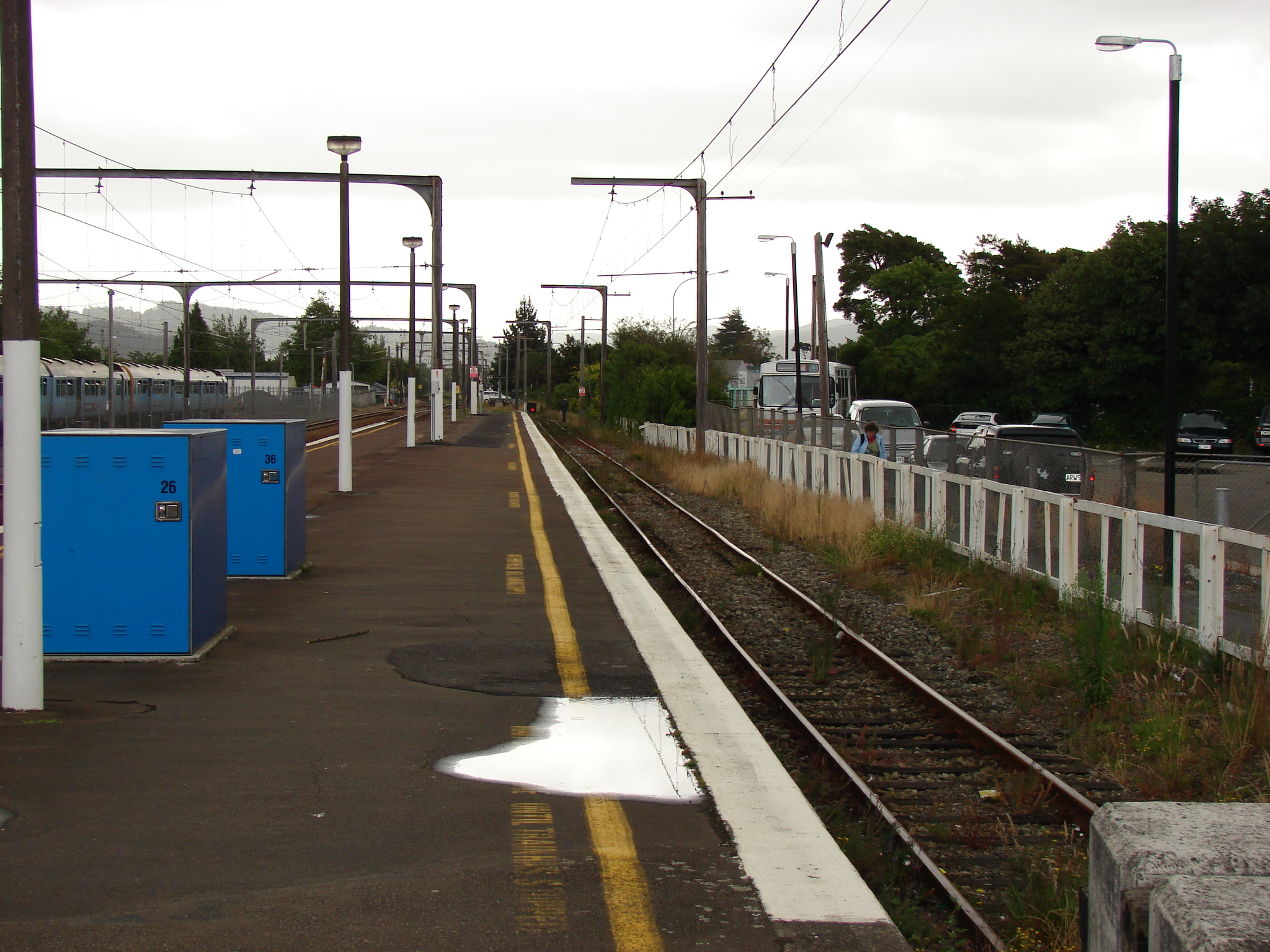
Upper Hutt railway station dock platform terminus (at buffer) in front of the railway station building. The blue boxes on the platform are cycle storage lockers.

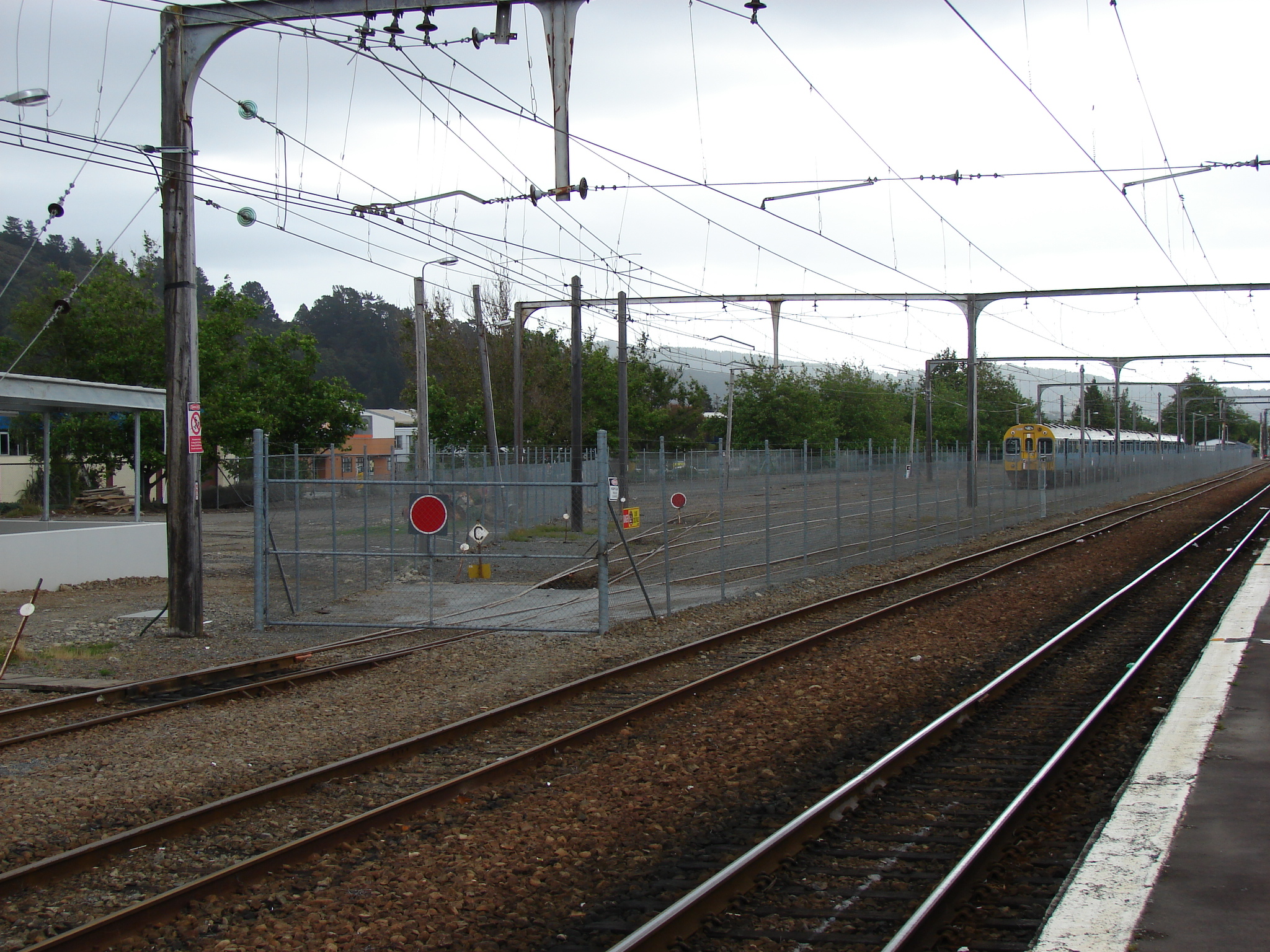
EMU storage area and row sidings at Upper Hutt railway station in a fenced part of the station yard. In the foreground are the crossing loop (left), and main line (right).

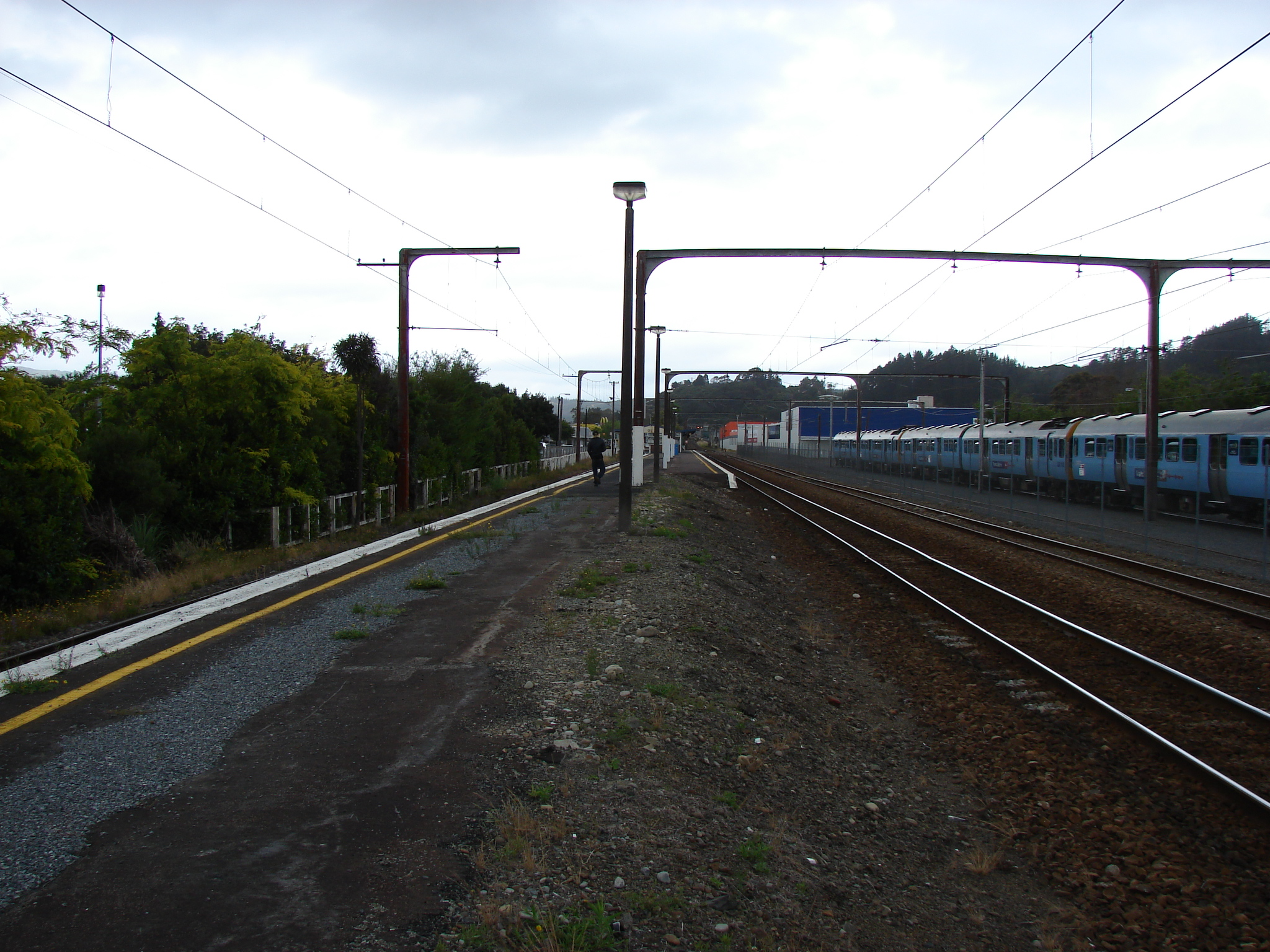
Looking north along the Upper Hutt railway station platform. To the left is the dock and to the right are the main line and crossing loop. Behind the fence (right) is the EMU storage area. In the background is the station building (centre), and neighbouring big-format retailers (right).

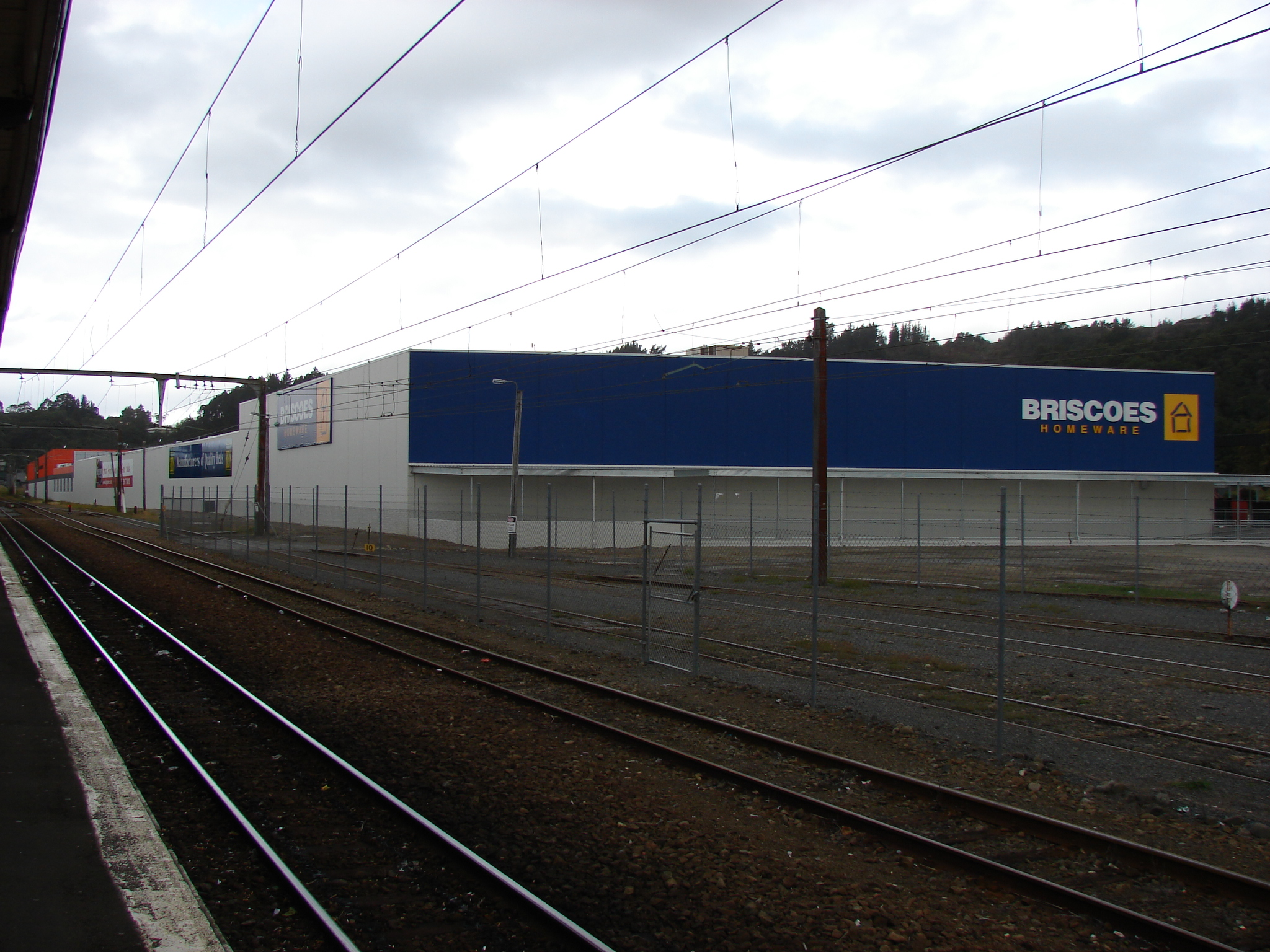
Neighbouring big-format retailers at Upper Hutt railway station, from foreground to background: Briscoes, Wellington Beds, Big Save Furniture, Mitre 10 Mega

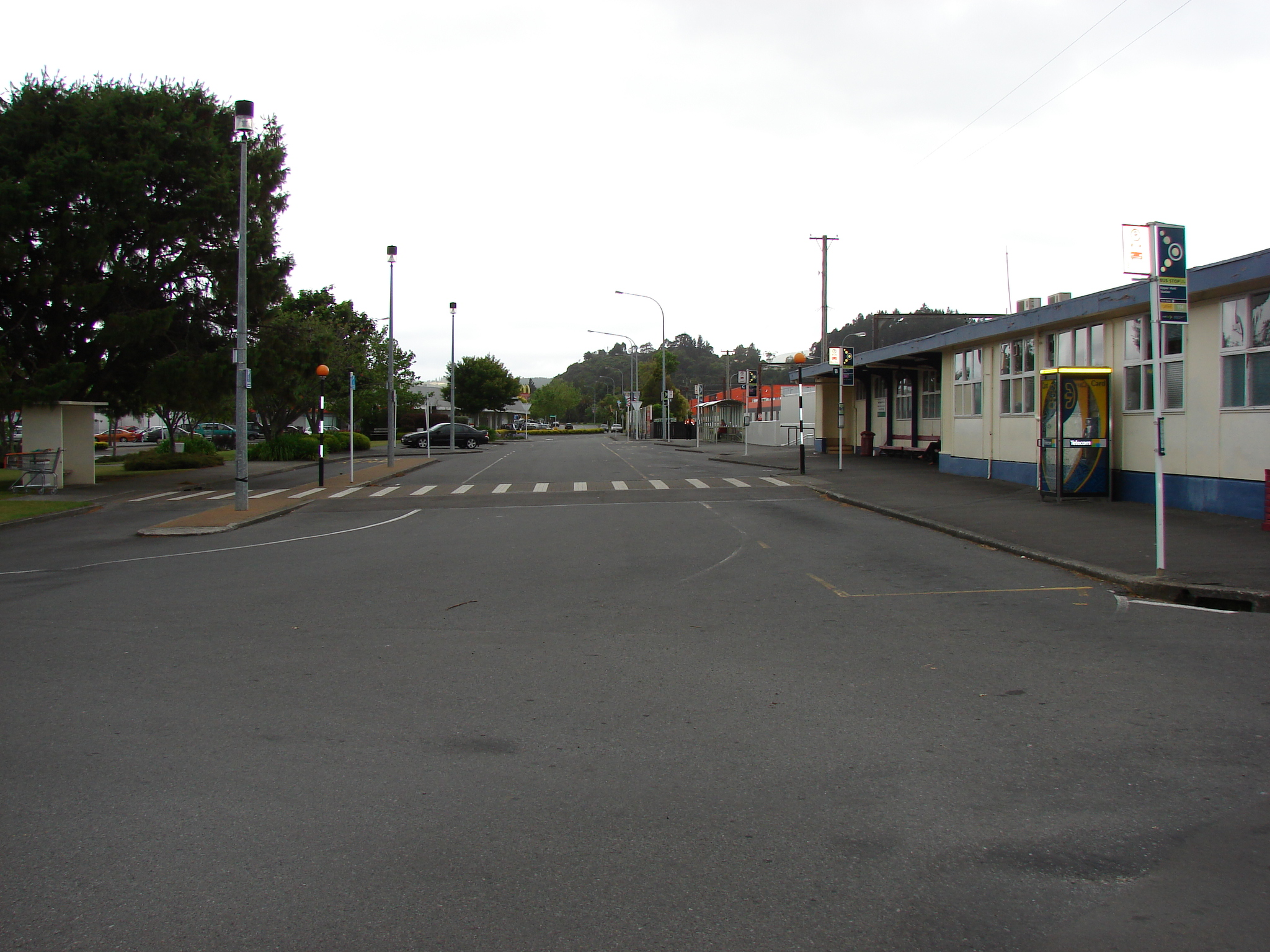
Bus terminal

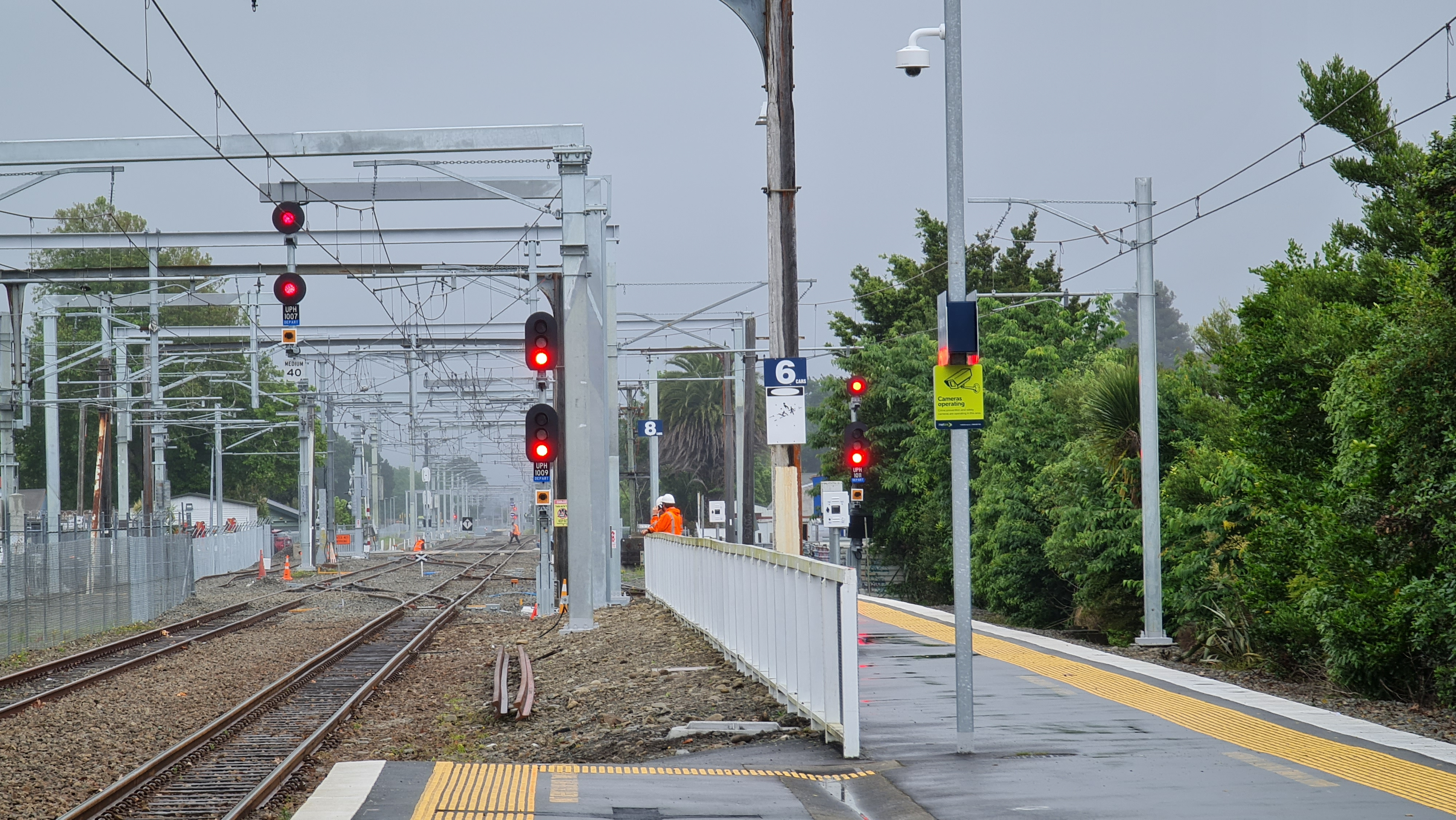
Commissioning of the new bi-directional signalling at Upper Hutt Station, 14 November 2021
