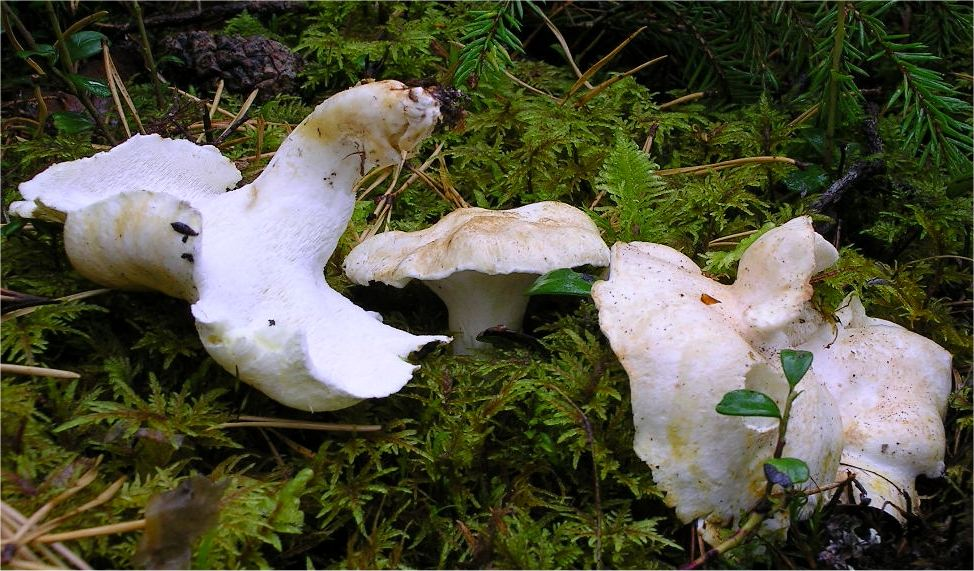

Scientific classification
- Kingdom: Fungi
- Division: Basidiomycota
- Class: Agaricomycetes
- Order: Russulales
- Family: Albatrellaceae
- Genus: Albatrellus
- Species: A. subrubescens

Binomial name
- Albatrellus subrubescens (Murrill) Pouz. (1972)

Synonyms
- Scutiger subrubescens Murrill (1940); Polyporus subrubescens (Murrill) Murrill (1947); Albatrellus similis Pouz. (1965); Scutiger ovinus var. subrubescens (Murrill) L.G.Krieglst. (1992); Albatrellus ovinus var. subrubescens (Murrill) L.G.Krieglst. (2000)

= Albatrellus subrubescens =

Species of fungus found in Asia, Europe and North America

Albatrellus subrubescens
- Mycological characteristics
- Pores on hymenium
- Cap is convex or flat
- Hymenium is decurrent
- Stipe is bare
- Spore print is white
- Ecology is mycorrhizal
- Edibility is poisonous

Albatrellus subrubescens is a species of polypore fungus in the family Albatrellaceae. The fruit bodies (mushrooms) of the fungus have whitish to pale buff-colored caps that can reach up to 14.5 cm (5.7 in) in diameter, and stems up to 7 cm (2.8 in) long and 2 cm (0.8 in) thick. On the underside of the caps are tiny light yellow to pale greenish-yellow pores, the site of spore production. When the fruit bodies are fresh, the cap and pores stain yellow where exposed, handled, or bruised.

The species is found in Asia, Europe, and North America, where it grows on the ground in deciduous or mixed woods, usually in association with pine trees. It is closely related, and physically similar, to the more common Albatrellus ovinus, from which it may be distinguished macroscopically by differences in the color when bruised, and microscopically by the amyloid (staining bluish-black to black with Melzer's reagent) walls of the spores. The fruit bodies of A. subrubescens contain scutigeral, a bioactive chemical that has antibiotic activity. A. subrubescens mushrooms are mildly poisonous, and consuming them will result in a short-term gastrointestinal illness.

== Taxonomy and phylogeny ==
The species was first described as Scutiger subrubescens by American mycologist William Murrill in 1940, based on collections that he found growing under oak near Gainesville, Florida, in November 1938. In 1947 he transferred it to the genus Polyporus. Josiah Lincoln Lowe examined Murrill's type material and thought that it did not differ from Albatrellus confluens. In 1965, Zdeněk Pouzar made collections from Bohemia (now the Czech Republic), and described it as a new species (Albatrellus similis), unaware of the similarity to Murrill's Florida specimens. Further study revealed that A. similis was identical to Murrill's Scutiger subrubescens, and Pouzar transferred the latter epithet to Albatrellus. In 1974, Pouzar recognized that Lowe's species Albatrellus confluens was distinct from A. subrubescens. The specific epithet subrubescens, "tinted reddish", is derived from the Latin words sub ("less than") and rubescens ("growing red").

- - A. ovinus
  - A. citrinus
  - A. subrubescens
- - A. tianschanicus

Phylogeny of A. subrubescens and selected related species based on ribosomal DNA sequences

Four Albatrellus species were included in a large-scale phylogenetic analysis of the order Russulales published in 2003. Based on their ribosomal DNA sequences, the four form a clade, or monophyletic group (that is, they derived from a single ancestor). Of the four tested species, A. ovinus was most closely related to A. subrubescens. The polypore Wrightoporia lenta (type species of the genus Wrightoporia) occurred on a single branch basal to the albatrellus clade, implying that it shared with the Albatrellus species a common ancestor from which both were descended. In a more recent (2010) molecular analysis by Canadian mycologist Serge Audet aimed at clarifying relationships among species formerly placed in Scutiger, A. subrubescens grouped in a clade with A. ovinus and A. citrinus. According to Audet, these species, in addition to A. avellaneus and A. piceiphilus, are the constituents of an Albatrellus with limits defined by molecular genetics. Other Albatrellus species were transferred to segregate genera: A. fletti and A. confluens to Albatrellopsis; A. caeruleoporus and A. yasudae to Neoalbatrellus; A. pes-caprae and A. ellisii to an amended Scutiger.

== Description ==
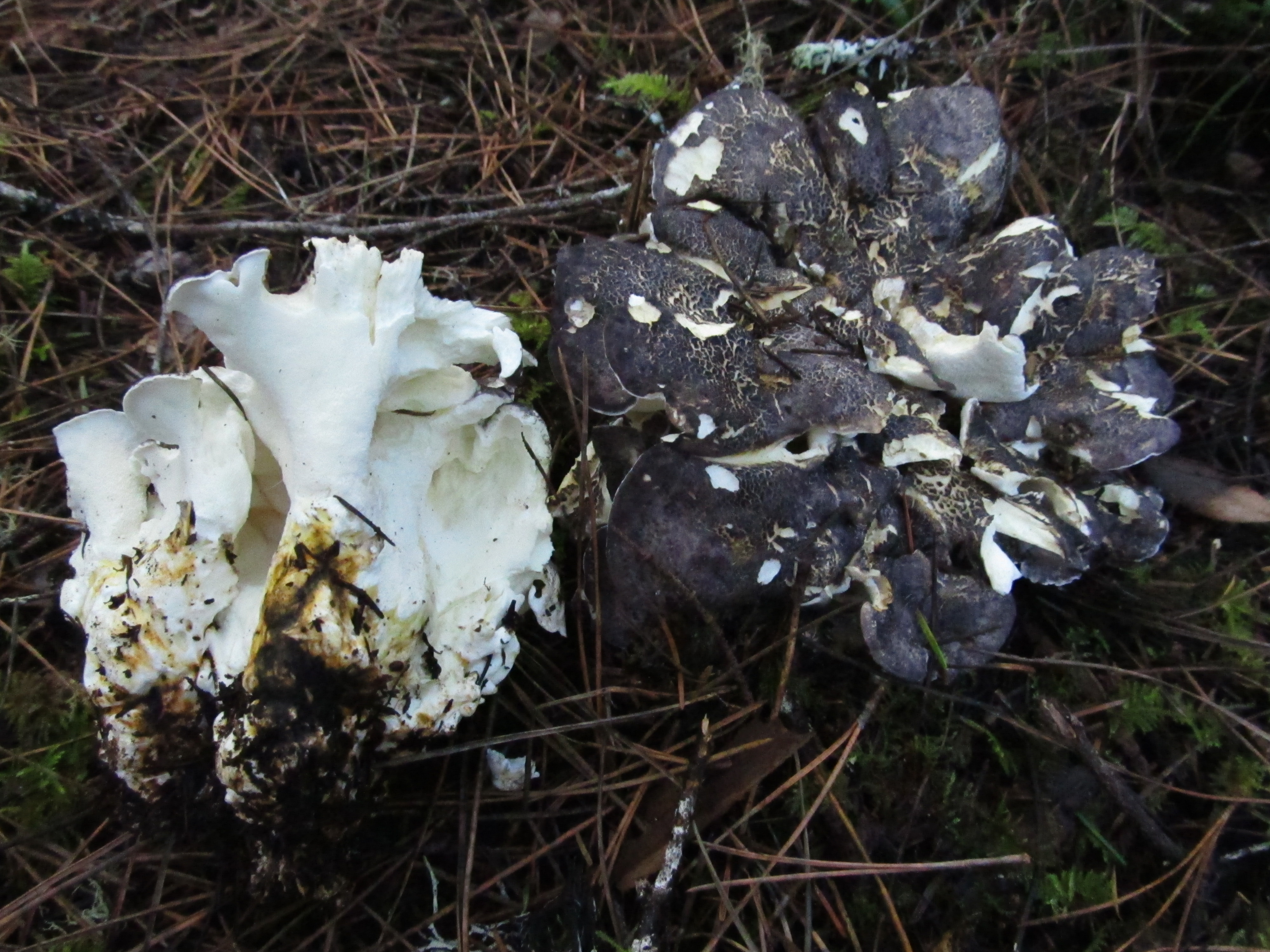
The caps of some North American populations have a blackish gray to purple-gray coloration.

The cap of A. subrubescens is between 6 and 14.5 cm (2.4 and 5.7 in) in diameter, with a central, eccentric (away from the center), or rarely lateral (attached to the edge of cap) stem. Initially, the cap is convex with an involute margin, flattening out with age. The cap margin may be folded or flat. The cap surface in young specimens is smooth but soon forms appressed scale-like spots, which may transform into scales in age. Initially, the cap has white margins and a brownish-violet center with scale-like spots; the center later becomes orange-brownish or ochraceous brown. According to Canadian mycologist James Ginns, who described North American Albatrellus species in 1997, some North American specimens may be covered with blackish-gray to purple-gray fibrils, but this characteristic is not seen in European collections. The cap discolors yellowish when bruised.

The stem is 1.6 to 7 cm (0.6 to 2.8 in) long and 1 to 2 cm (0.4 to 0.8 in) thick, cylindrical, irregular, and its base may be somewhat pointed, or bulbous. Initially white, the stem develops orange/violet spots and later brownish orange spots; in old specimens the stem may be brownish brick red. The tubes on the pore surface (underside of the cap) are about 2.5–3 mm long and decurrent in attachment. The pores are small, measuring about 2–3 per millimeter. They are initially greenish-white, but later turn dark brown; dried specimens can have pores that are tinted green. Fruit bodies have a "faintly fragrant, pleasant" odor; in his original report on the species, Murrill noted that specimens left to dry in an oven developed a strong odor of burnt sugar. The taste of the mushroom has been described variously as indistinct, or "distinctly bitter". The type material was noted by Murrill to taste bitter, an observation later corroborated by Pouzar with European collections. A. subrubescens mushrooms are mildly toxic: consumption causes a gastrointestinal illness that usually subsides one to four hours after ingestion. However, some sources in Finland consider it edible, although it is quite rare there.

In deposit, the spores are white. The spores are 3.4–4.7 by 2.2–3.4 μm, ellipsoid to ovoid in shape, and amyloid (absorbing iodine when stained with Melzer's reagent). Most have a single large oil drop. The spore-bearing cells (the basidia) are club-shaped, 12–16 μm long by 5.7–7.7 μm thick, and have four thin, slightly curved sterigmata that are 3.4–4.3 μm long. The hymenium lacks any cystidia. The hyphal system is monomitic, meaning that the context is made of thin-walled generative hyphae. These hyphae have lengths in the range of 3.5–30 μm (most commonly 6–17 μm), with thin walls (up to 1 μm thick), and are hyaline (translucent). Although they are inamyloid, some hyphae have internal masses that are colored pale bluish-gray to black, which makes them appear collectively grayish-black under the microscope. Gloeoporous hyphae (wide and thin-walled with refractive contents) are also scattered throughout the context, as well as some hyphae with expanded tips that are thick-walled and amyloid.

=== Similar species ===
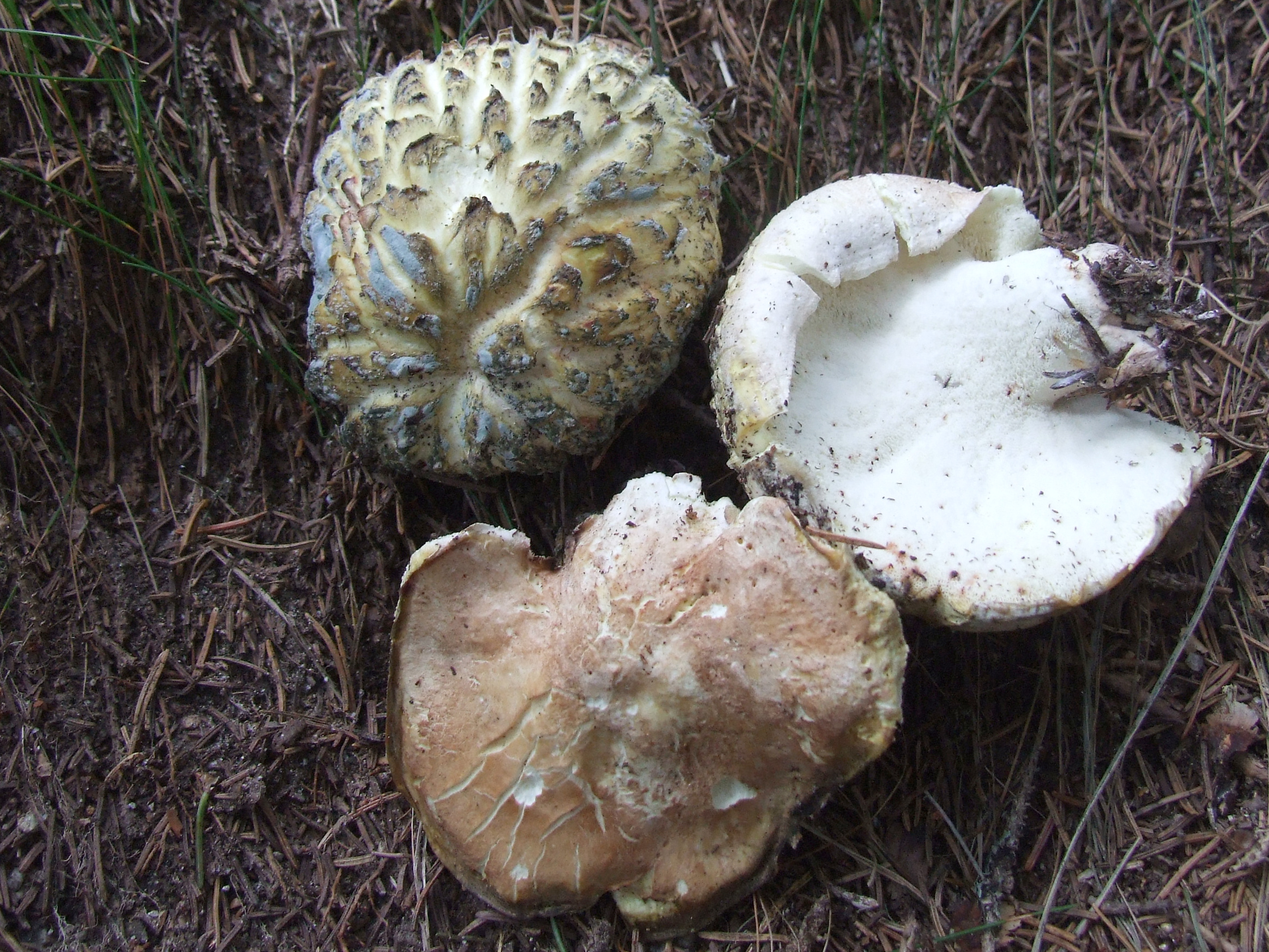
Albatrellus ovinus is reliably distinguished from A. subrubescens by its smaller, inamyloid spores.

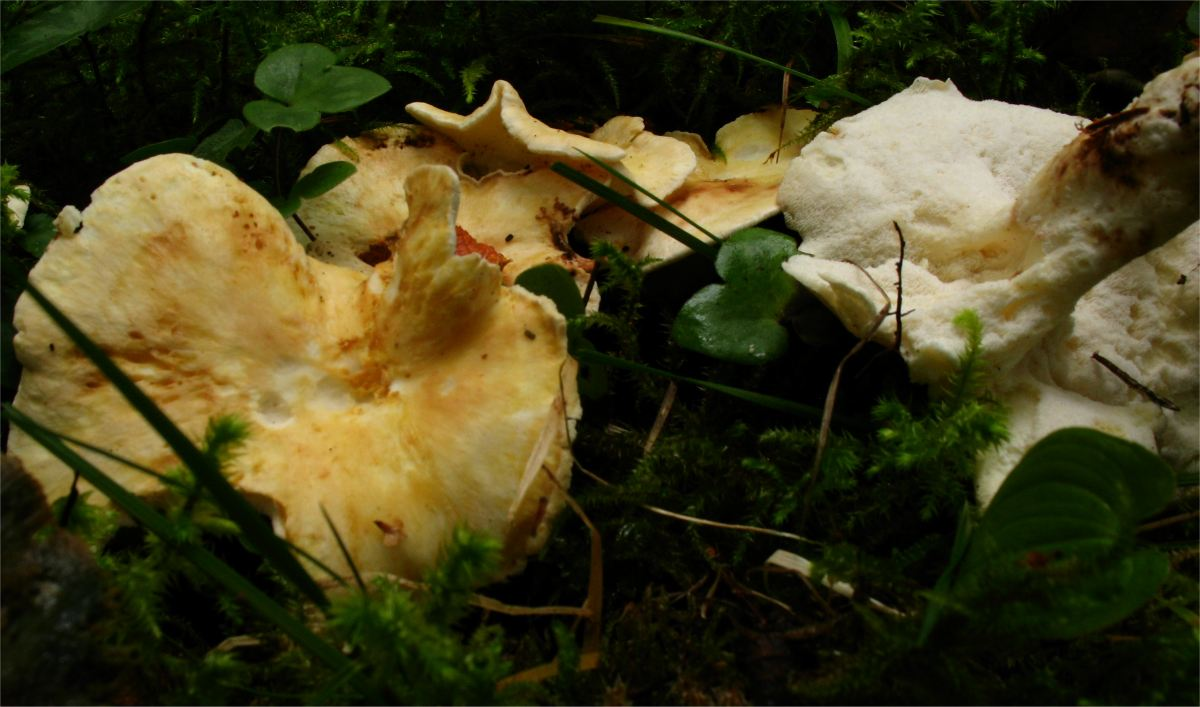
Albatrellus citrinus fruit bodies bruise yellow and grow with spruce.

In general, A. subrubescens can be distinguished from other Albatrellus species by its white cap that becomes orange when bruised, its simple-septate hyphae, small amyloid spores, and habitat under pines. In the field, Albatrellus ovinus is difficult to differentiate from A. subrubescens due to its similar appearance. A. ovinus usually lacks the violet color often seen in the cap and stem of A. subrubescens. Microscopic characteristics can be used to reliably distinguish the two species: the spores of A. subrubescens are amyloid, in contrast to those of A. ovinus, and A. ovinus spores are smaller, typically 3.8–4.6 by 3.3–3.5 μm. Other similar species include A. tianschanicus, described from the Altai Mountains in East-Central Asia, and the Japanese species A. cantharellus. Unlike A. subrubescens, these species have hairy scales on the surface of their caps, and the scales are darker than the spaces between the scales. Also, the scales of A. subrubescens are not much darker than the area between the scales. Both of these Asian species have larger spores than A. subrubescens: those of A. cantharellus are 4.5–7 by 4–5.5 μm, while those of A. tianschanicus are 5–7 by 4–5 μm.

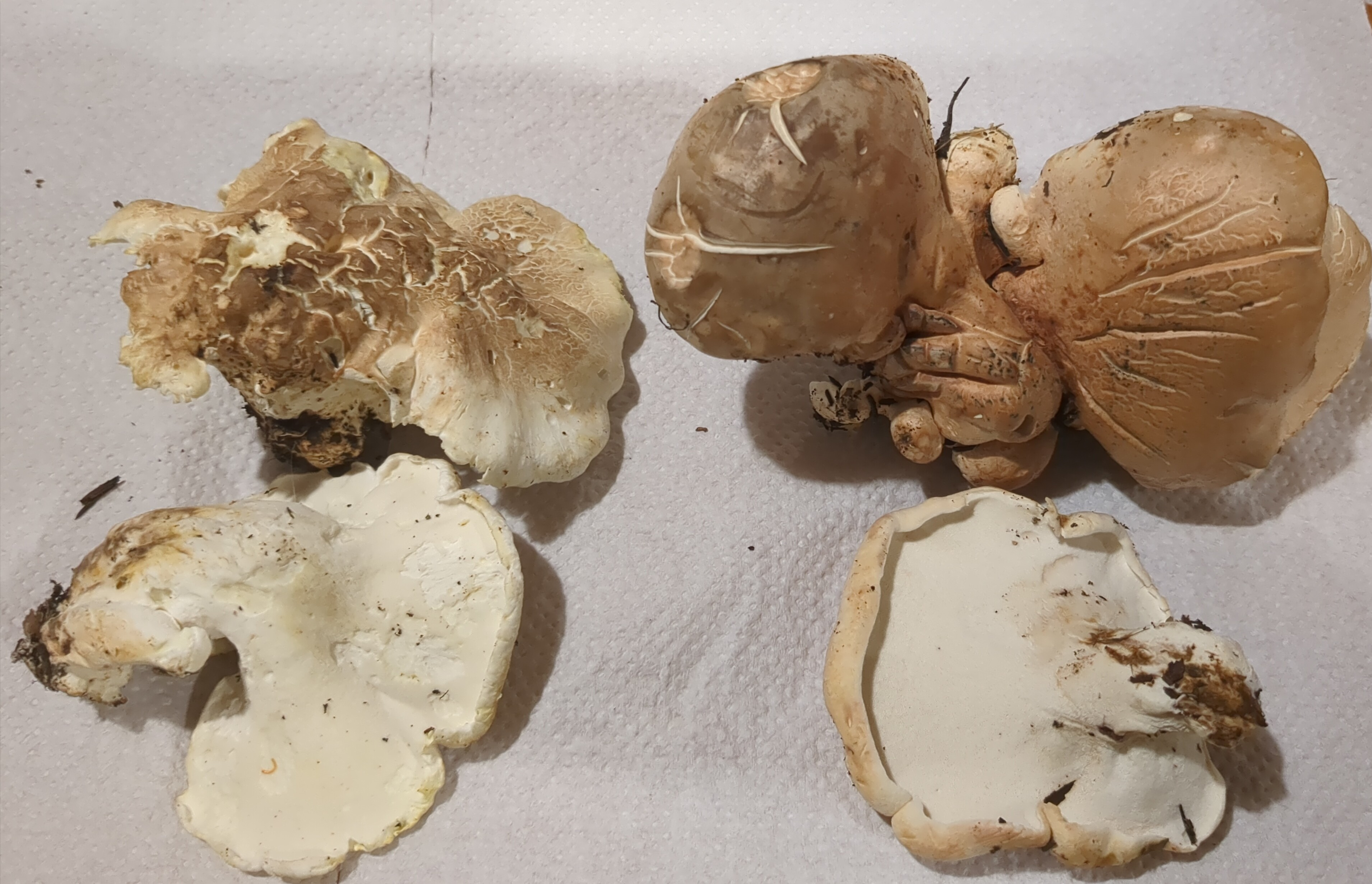
Albatrellus subrubescens vs A. confluens

Albatrellopsis confluens has caps that are pinkish-buff to pale orange, and white flesh that dries to a pinkish-buff; it has a taste that is bitter, or like cabbage. The spores of A. confluens are weakly amyloid. Additional differences distinguishing Albatrellopsis confluens from A. subrubescens include the presence of clamp connections in the context hyphae, and mycelium on the base of the stem. The European fungus A. citrinus, originally considered a morphotype of A. subrubescens, was described as a new species in 2003. It is distinguished from A. subrubescens morphologically by its smaller caps (up to 7 cm (2.8 in) in diameter), the yellowish bruising of the caps with age or after handling, and the absence of violet spots on the cap. A. citrinus associates with spruce rather than pine, and requires calcareous (lime-rich) soil.

== Habitat and distribution ==
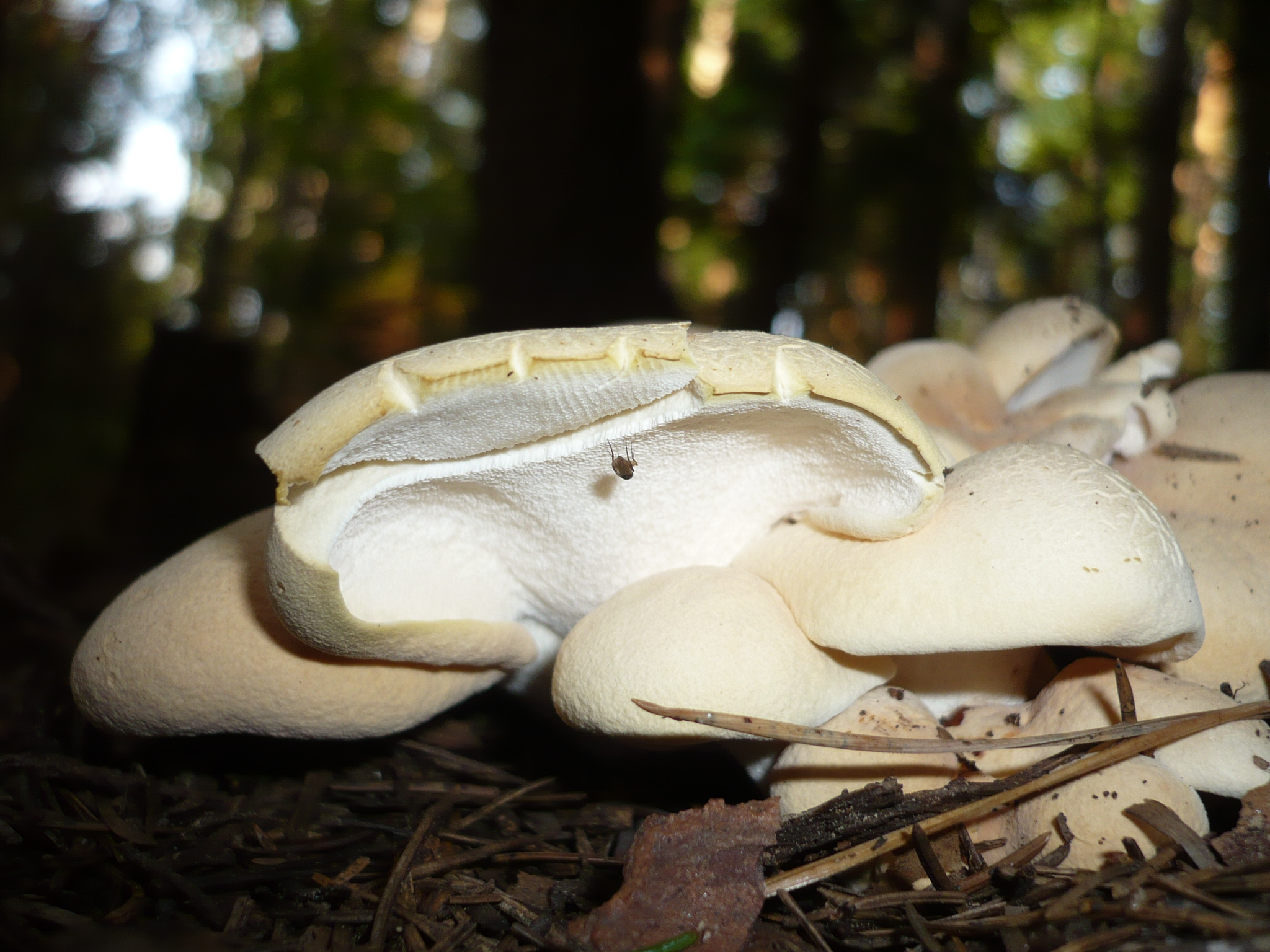
Fruit bodies sometimes grow in groups fused at the caps or stem bases.

Fruit bodies of A. subrubescens are usually solitary, but sometimes several (typically between two and eight) are stuck together by the stem bases or on the sides of their caps. A strictly terrestrial species, it is not found fruiting on wood. It prefers to grow in pine woods, but has occasionally been associated with silver fir in Europe; fruit bodies associated with the latter tree species tend to be less robust than those found growing with pine. It is suspected that A. subrubescens may be mycorrhizal with two- and three-needle pines (i.e., those species that have their needles attached in bundles of two or three), although its ecological preferences are not known with certainty. Ginns, relating a personal communication with David Arora, wrote that Arora encountered several clumps of fruit bodies in an area in California containing mostly knobcone pine (a three-needle pine), manzanita, huckleberry and a few mandrones.

The species has been reported from a variety of locations in temperate regions of Asia, Europe, and North America. In North America, its distribution includes Alberta, Quebec, and the Northwest Territories in Canada. In the United States, it is found in Alabama, Arizona, California, Florida, New York, Texas, Washington, and Wisconsin. The North American distribution extends south to Mexico, in Chiapas. In Asia, the fungus has been recorded from Yunnan in southwest China, and Tibet. In Europe, collections have been reported from Austria, Czechoslovakia, Finland, Germany, Italy, Poland, Sweden, Switzerland, Yugoslavia, and Ukraine.

== Bioactive compounds ==
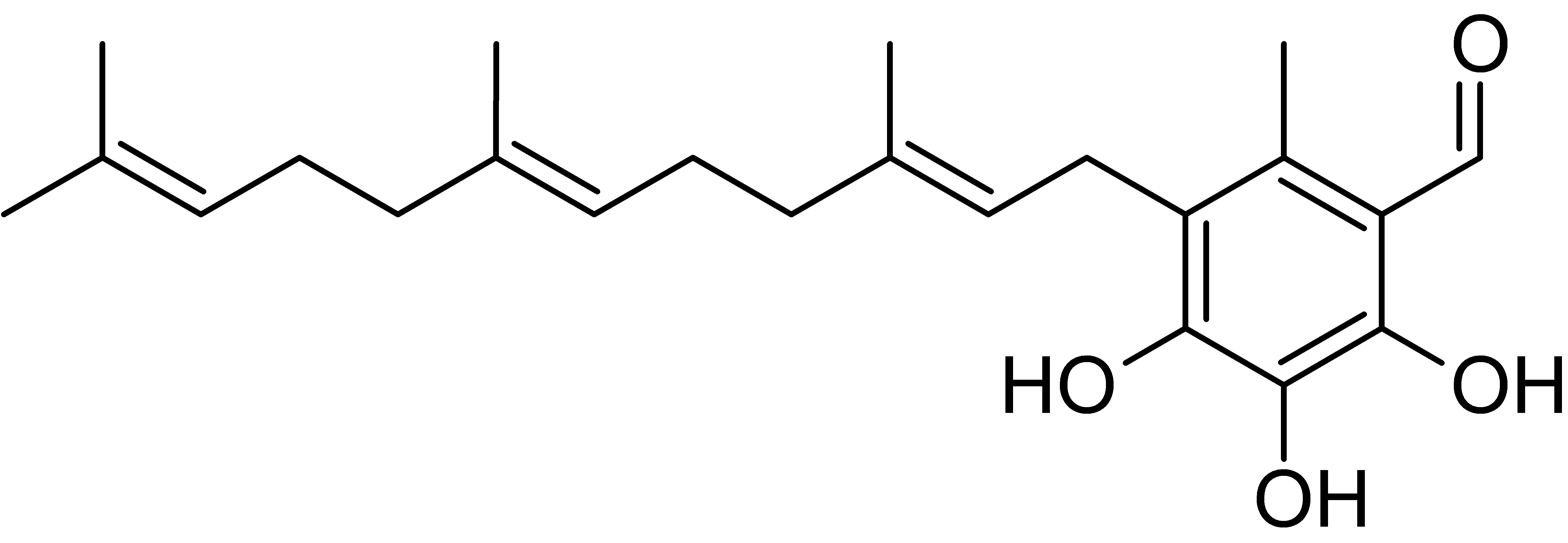
Chemical structure of scutigeral

Albatrellus subrubescens contains the bioactive compound scutigeral, which has antibiotic activity. This chemical—also found in the related species A. ovinus—may contribute to the mushroom's toxicity by disturbing the body's intestinal flora. Scutigeral interacts selectively to the dopamine receptor D_{1} subfamily (the most abundant dopamine receptor in the central nervous system, regulating neuronal growth and development, and mediating some behavioral responses). A 1999 publication suggested that scutigeral has agonistic activity at vanilloid receptors (a receptor found on sensory nerves in mammals); specifically, that it affects the uptake of calcium in the neurons of rat dorsal root ganglia. Later reports failed to corroborate this pharmacological activity. One 2003 study reported that scutigeral acts as a weak antagonist on the human vanilloid receptor VR1, while another study published that year did not find any activity.
