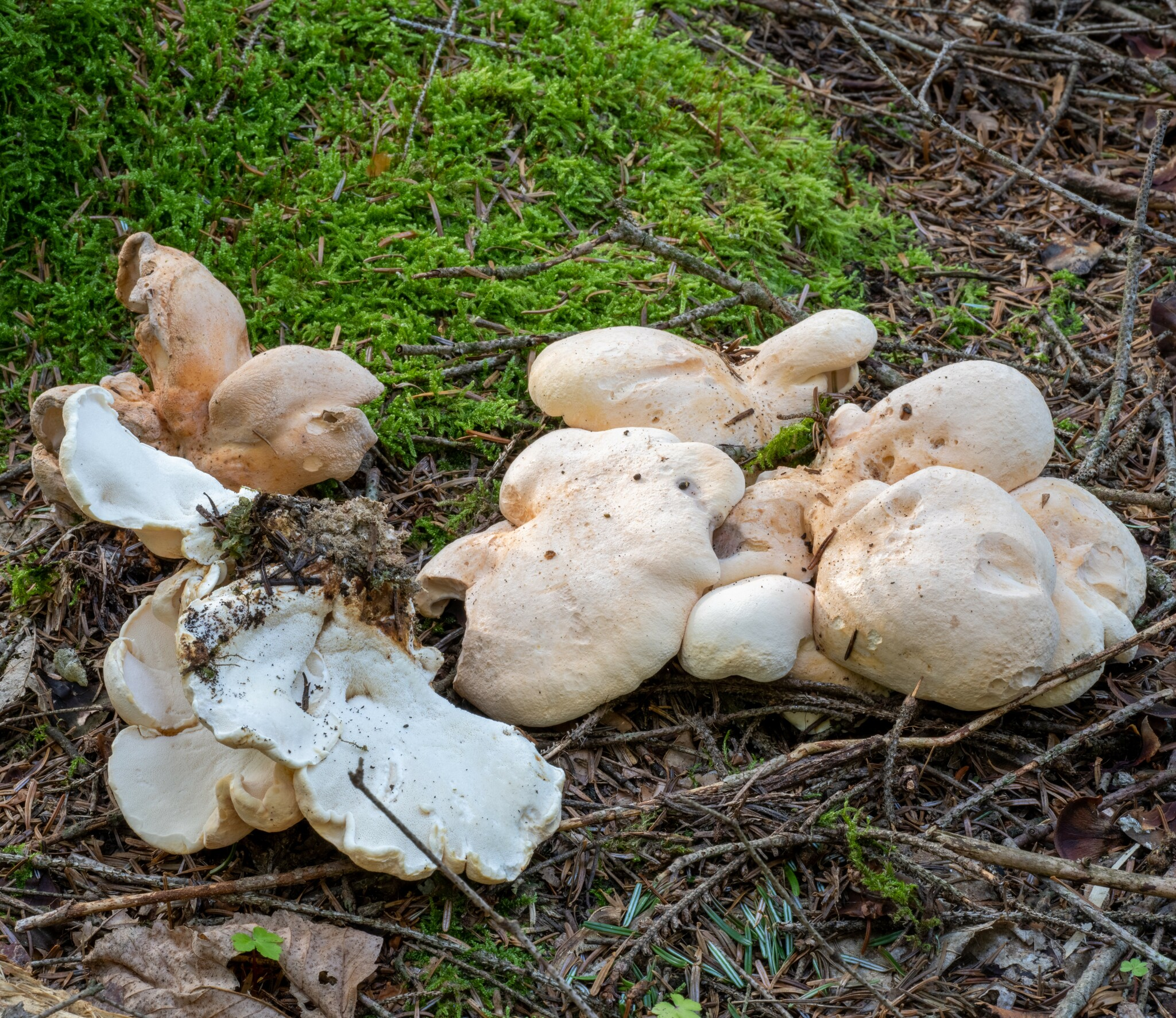

Scientific classification
- Kingdom: Fungi
- Division: Basidiomycota
- Class: Agaricomycetes
- Order: Russulales
- Family: Albatrellaceae
- Genus: Albatrellopsis
- Species: A. confluens

Binomial name
- Albatrellopsis confluens (Alb. & Schwein.) Kotl. & Pouzar (1957)

Synonyms
- List: Albatrellus confluens (Alb. & Schwein.) Kotl. & Pouzar (1957); Boletus artemidorus Lentz, Nütz. schädl. Schwämme: 80 (1830); Boletus aurantius Schaeff. (1774); Boletus confluens Alb. & Schwein. (1805); Boletus nitens J.F. Gmel. (1792); Caloporus confluens (Alb. & Schwein.) Quél. (1888); Caloporus confluens f. politus (Fr.) Pilát (1931); Caloporus politus (Fr.) Quél. (1886); Cladomeris confluens (Alb. & Schwein.) Quél. (1886); Merisma confluens (Alb. & Schwein.) Gillet (1878); Polypilus confluens (Alb. & Schwein.) P. Karst. (1881); Polyporus artemidorus (Lentz) Fr. (1838); Polyporus confluens (Alb. & Schwein.) Fr. (1821); Polyporus confluens subsp. pachypus Pers. (1825); Polyporus laeticolor (Murrill) Sacc. & D. Sacc. (1905); Polyporus pachypus (Pers.) Sacc. (1888); Polyporus politus Fr. (1836); Polyporus whiteae (Murrill) Sacc. & D. Sacc. (1905); Scutiger confluens (Alb. & Schwein.) Bondartsev & Singer (1941); Scutiger confluens f. politus (Fr.) Bondartsev (1953); Scutiger laeticolor Murrill (1903); Scutiger whiteae Murrill (1903)

= Albatrellopsis confluens =

Species of fungus

Albatrellopsis confluens is a species of fungus in the family Albatrellaceae. It is commonly referred to as fused polypore. It is similar to Albatrellus ovinus, but bitter and with age tend to salmon color.

== Taxonomy ==
The species was reclassified from genus Albatrellus to Albatrellopsis in 1993 based on morphological characteristics and phylogenetic analysis. Recent molecular phylogenetic analysis showed high sequence similarity with Albatrellopsis flettii and confirmed this reclassification.

== Description ==
The cap is 3–15 centimetres (1 1/4–6 in) in diameter, hemispherical or irregularly circular. The surface color is cream or apricot with an orange tinge, sometimes also reddish-brown or ochre. It is flaky at the edges. The skin becomes cracked in the dry period. It usually occurs in clusters of fused fruit bodies up to 50 cm (20 in) across.

The hymenophore is made of tubes up to 3 millimetres (1/8 in) long, decurrent on the stem, white. The pores are very small and circular. The spore print is white. The spores are broadly ovate to almost spherical, colorless, smooth and measure 4.5–5 × 3–3.5 μm.

The stipe is 3 to 6 cm (1 1/4 to 2 1/4 in) long, 2 to 2.5 cm (3/4 to 1 in) wide, and not very distinct. It is central, eccentric or lateral. The colour is white, sometimes with an apricot, rusty tinge and spots.

The flesh is cream-coloured. The odour is weak and pleasant, the taste bitter.

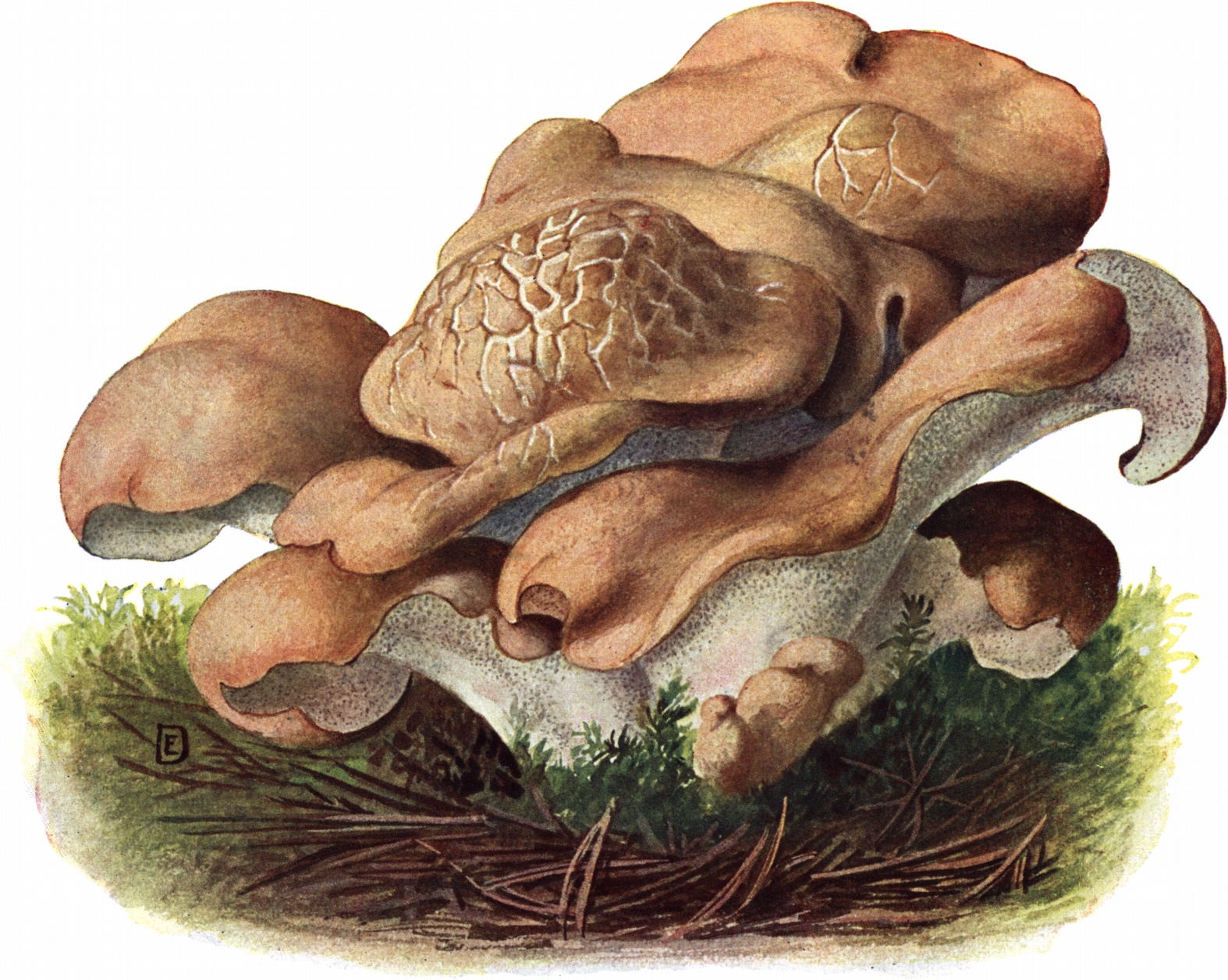
Illustration

=== Similar species ===
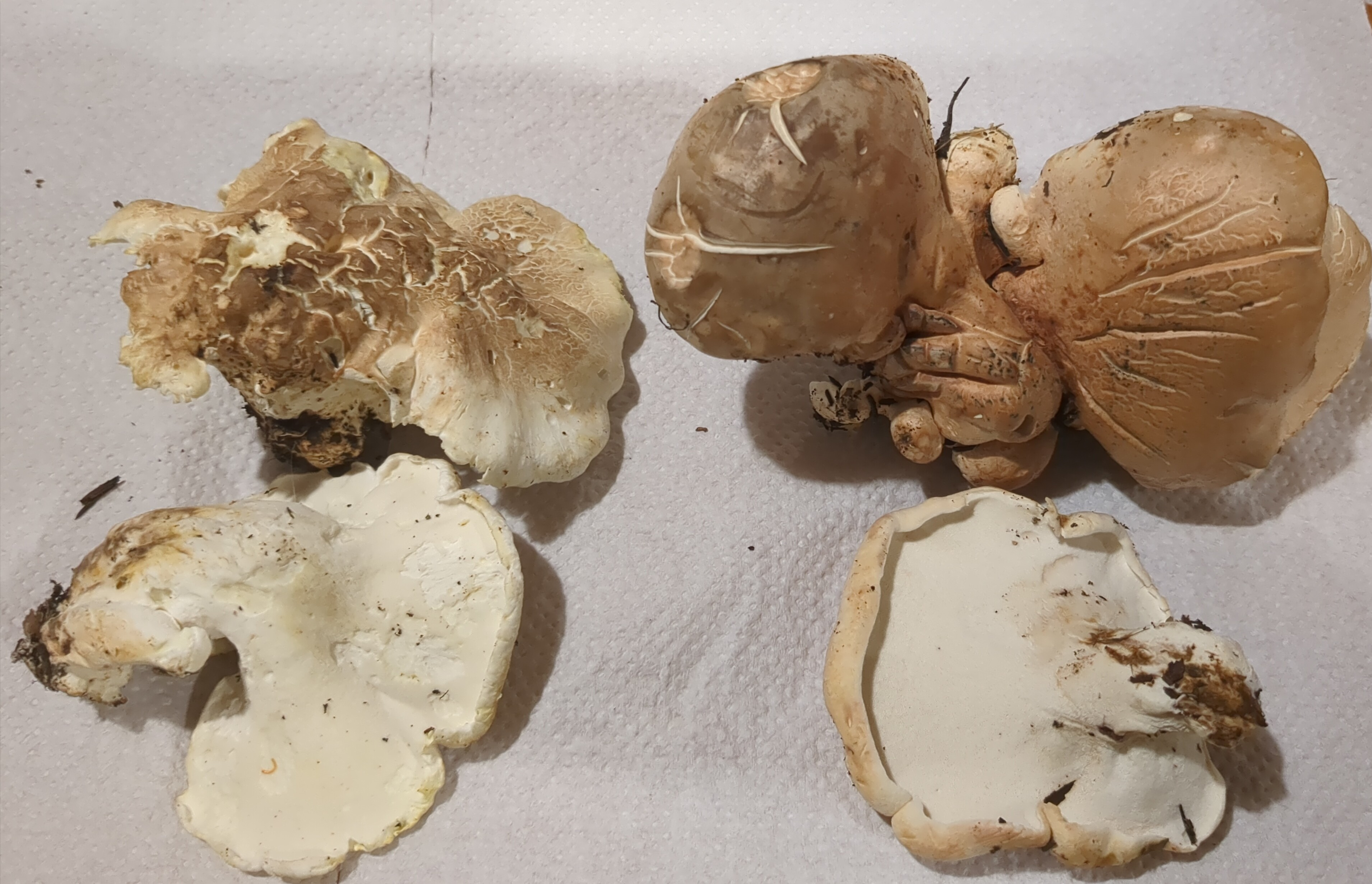
Albatrellus subrubescens and A. confluens

- Albatrellus subrubescens has a cap-shaped fruiting body, with a more distinct stem; the cap is brown-purple, whitish-yellow or ochre-brown, the stem is whitish with orange-purple or brown-orange spots, later the entire brick-brown, and grows in pine forests.
- Albatrellus ovinus has a very light cap, lemon-yellow pores, the flesh turns yellow as it dries and does not grow in fused clumps.
- Laeticutis cristata has a yellow-green to brown cap and grows in deciduous forests, mainly beech forests, although it can also be found in coniferous mountain forests.
- Hydnum rufescens and H. repandum have a hymenophore made of tooth-like or spine-like projections.

== Distribution and habitat ==
A species widespread in Europe and North America, recorded also in Japan and on the Yorke Peninsula in Australia.

Albatrellopsis confluens is a saprotrophic fungus. It occurs sporadically in coniferous and mixed forests and most often found in mountain spruce forests. It grows on the ground, singly or in crowded clumps from July to October.

== Edibility ==
The mushroom is edible when young, while old specimens are unpalatable and bitter. Due to its poor taste and rarity, picking is advised against.

== Biochemistry ==
Albatrellopsis confluens is noted for its medicinal properties, particularly due to the presence of the bioactive compound grifolin. Studies have demonstrated that grifolin exhibits significant anticancer activity by inducing apoptosis and promoting cell cycle arrest, specifically in ovarian and human osteosarcoma cells. The compound achieves this by inactivating key signaling pathways, such as ERK1/2 and PI3K/AKT. Additionally, grifolin has been found to have anti-inflammatory and antioxidant properties.
