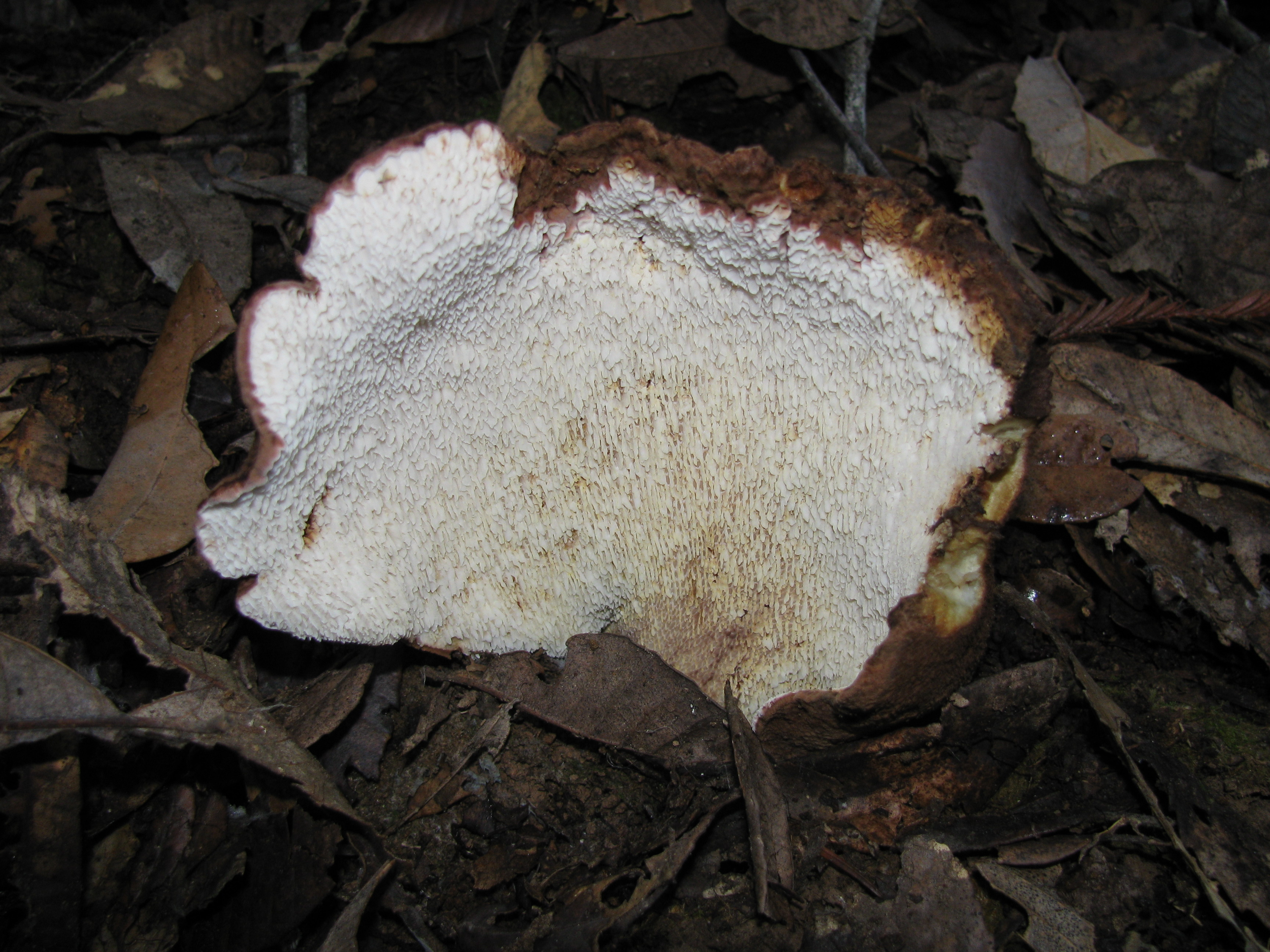

Scientific classification
- Kingdom: Fungi
- Division: Basidiomycota
- Class: Agaricomycetes
- Order: Russulales
- Family: Albatrellaceae
- Genus: Scutiger
- Species: S. S. pes-caprae

Binomial name
- Scutiger Scutiger pes-caprae (Pers.) Bondartsev & Singer (1941)

Synonyms
- Fungus sapatella Paulet (1793); Fungus tuber Paulet (1793); Polyporus pes-caprae Pers. (1818); Boletus pes-caprae (Pers.) Cordier (1826); Cerioporus inflexus Schulzer ex Quél. (1888); Polyporus retipes Underw. (1897); Scutiger retipes (Underw.) Murrill (1903); Fomes oregonensis (Murrill) Sacc. & Traverso (1910); Polyporus oregonensis (Murrill) Murrill (1912); Scutiger oregonensis Murrill (1912); Caloporus pes-caprae (Pers.) Pilát (1931); Albatrellus pes-caprae (Pers.) Pouzar (1966); Polypilus pes-caprae (Pers.) Teixeira (1992); Albatrellopsis pes-caprae (Pers.) Teixeira (1994)

= Scutiger pes-caprae =

Species of fungus

Scutiger pes-caprae
- Mycological characteristics
- Pores on hymenium
- Cap is convex or depressed
- Hymenium is decurrent
- Stipe is bare
- Ecology is saprotrophic
- Edibility is edible

Scutiger pes-caprae, commonly known as the goat's foot, is a species of fungus in the family Albatrellaceae.

It is distributed in North America and Europe and associated with conifers and rotting wood. The young caps of European specimens are potentially edible.

== Taxonomy ==
It was first described officially as a species of Polyporus by Christian Hendrik Persoon in 1818. In recent decades, it was known most commonly as a species of Albatrellus until molecular research published by Canadian mycologist Serge Audet in 2010 revealed that it was more appropriate in an emended version of the genus Scutiger.

== Description ==
The brownish cap is 6–20 centimetres (2 1/2–8 in) wide, tending towards a convex kidney shape, sometimes lobed, and flattening with age. There are 1–2 whitish pores per millimetre that may discolor pink or greenish. The usually decurrent tubes are up to 5 mm long.

The stem is 2.5–8 cm (1–3 1/4 in) long and 1–4 cm (1/2–1 1/2 in) thick; it is usually larger at the base, where several mushrooms may be conjoined. The flesh is 5–20 millimetres (1/4–3/4 in) thick and whitish, slowly bruising pinkish; it tastes mild. The spore print is whitish.

=== Similar species ===
Scutiger ellisii, Laeticutis cristata, and Jahnoporus hirtus bear similarities.

== Distribution and habitat ==
It is found in western North America, under conifers and on rotting wood, from August to February. It is somewhat more common in the south than Albatrellus ellisii.

== Uses ==
The caps of young European specimens are reportedly edible, but chewy, after thorough cooking.
