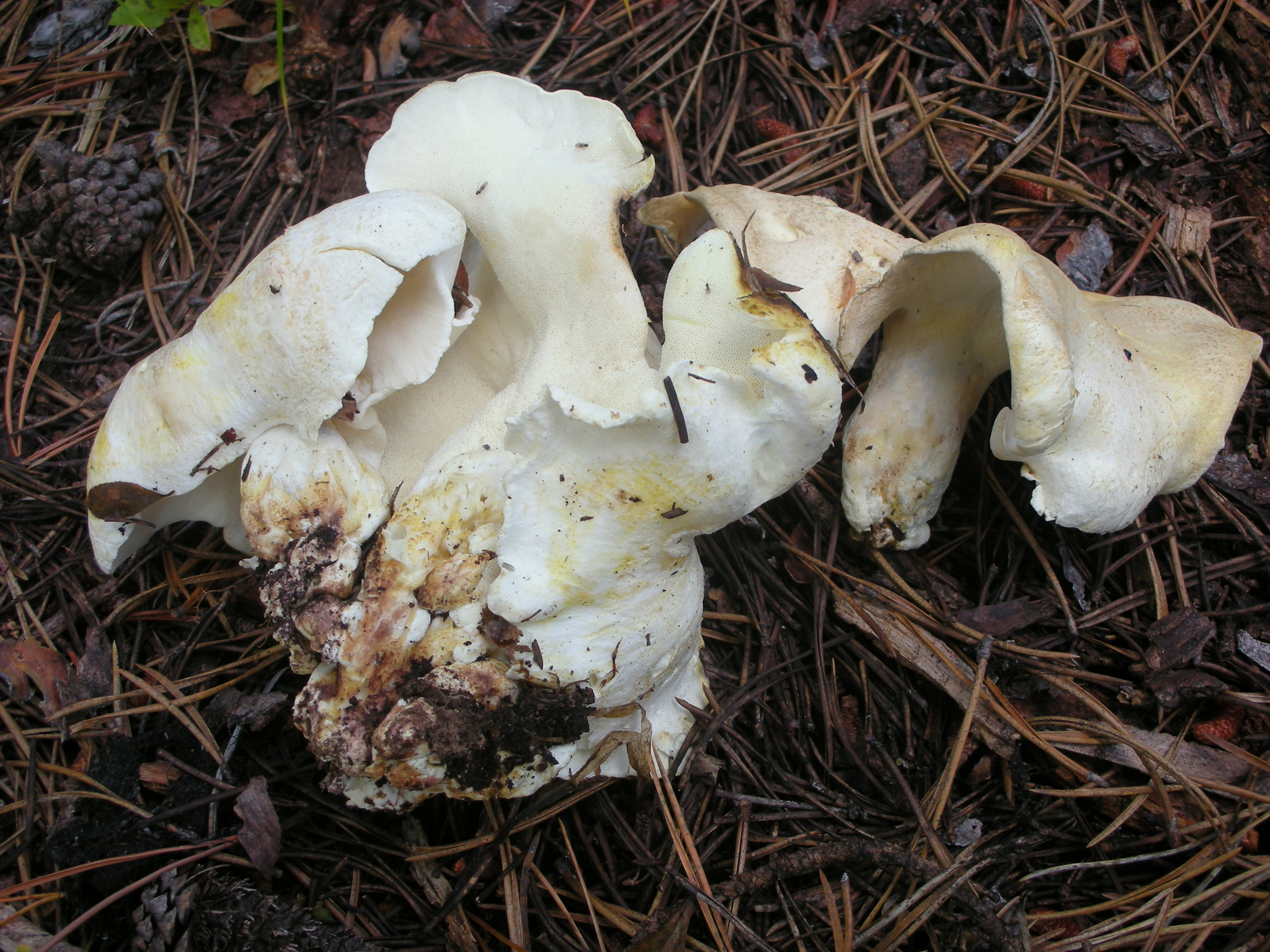

Conservation status
- Vulnerable (NatureServe)

Scientific classification
- Kingdom: Fungi
- Division: Basidiomycota
- Class: Agaricomycetes
- Order: Russulales
- Family: Albatrellaceae
- Genus: Albatrellus
- Species: A. avellaneus

Binomial name
- Albatrellus avellaneus Pouzar (1972)

= Albatrellus avellaneus =

Species of fungus

Albatrellus avanellus
- Mycological characteristics
- Pores on hymenium
- Cap is depressed or infundibuliform
- Hymenium is subdecurrent
- Lacks a stipe
- Spore print is white
- Ecology is mycorrhizal
- Edibility is edible

Albatrellus avellaneus is a species of fungus in the family Albatrellaceae. Found in the United States and Canada, it was described by Czech mycologist Zdeněk Pouzar in 1972. It is associated with conifers such as western hemlock and spruce.

Sometimes multiple fruit bodies grow into one merged form. The cap is buff, occasionally with reddish tones; yellow hues become stronger with age, when scales also emerge. The tubes are white, staining yellowish with age. The stem is buff above and brownish below. Dried mushrooms tend to take on orangish hues.

Similar species include Albatrellus ovinus and A. subrubescens.
