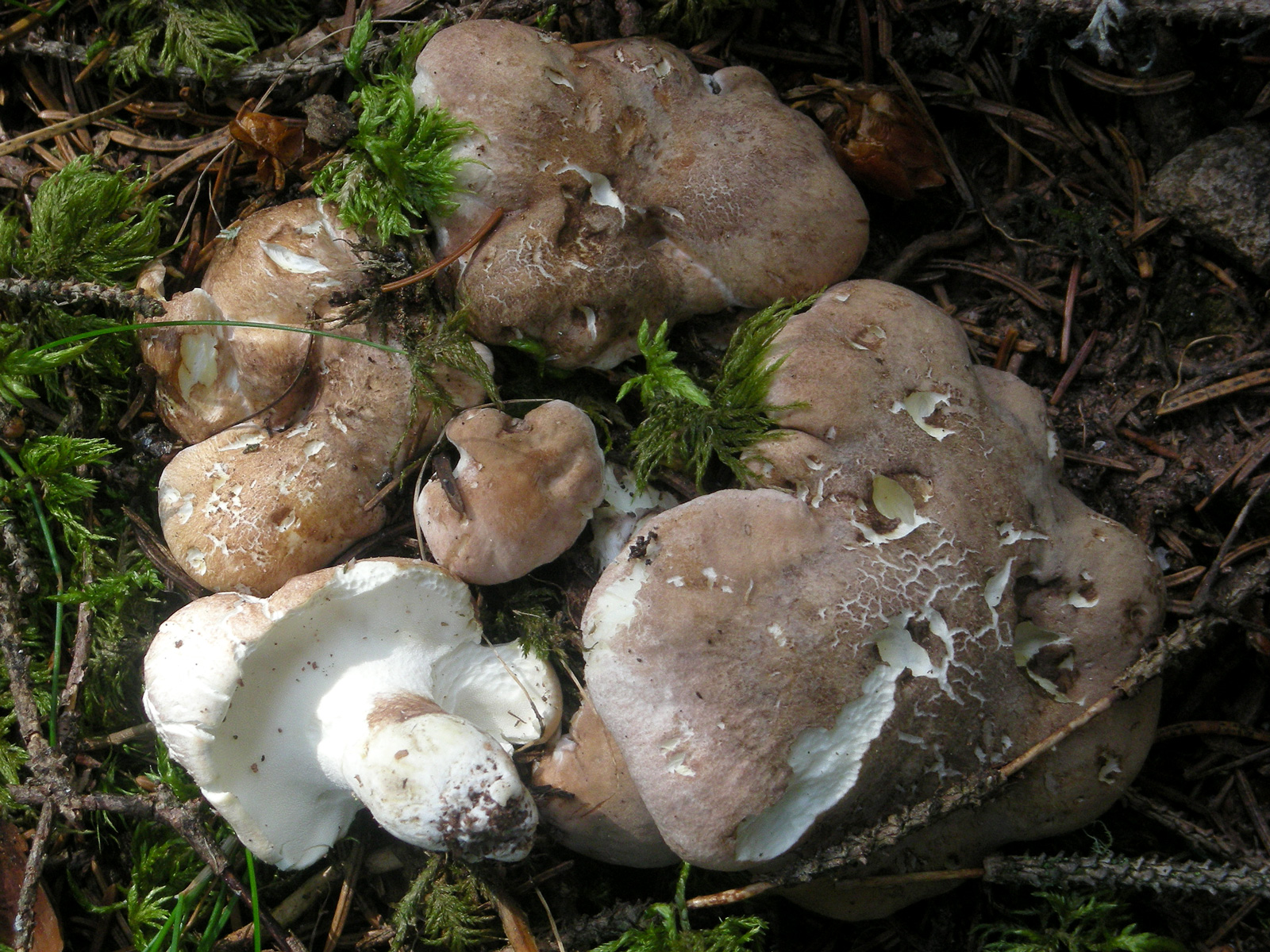
- Albatrellus ovinus

Scientific classification
- Kingdom: Fungi
- Division: Basidiomycota
- Class: Agaricomycetes
- Order: Russulales
- Family: Albatrellaceae
- Genus: Albatrellus; Gray (1821)

Type species
- Albatrellus ovinus (Schaeff. ex Fr.) Kotl. & Pouzar (1957)

Synonyms
- Caloporus Quél. (1886); Polyporus sect. Ovinus Lloyd (1911); Albatrellopsis Teixeira (1993)

= Albatrellus =

Genus of fungi

Albatrellus is a genus of 19 species of mushroom-producing fungi in the family Albatrellaceae. Species are common in northern temperate forests, producing medium to large fleshy fruit bodies of various colors.

== Taxonomy ==
British botanist Samuel Frederick Gray first described the genus in his 1821 work "A Natural Arrangement of British Plants".

Parsimony analysis of internal transcribed spacer sequences of various Albatrellus species show that the genus is not monophyletic, and that the species may be divided into two clades. This corroborates prior phylogenetic analysis that suggested that Albatrellus consists of two separate groups with affinity to the Russuloid and Polyporoid clades.

== Description ==
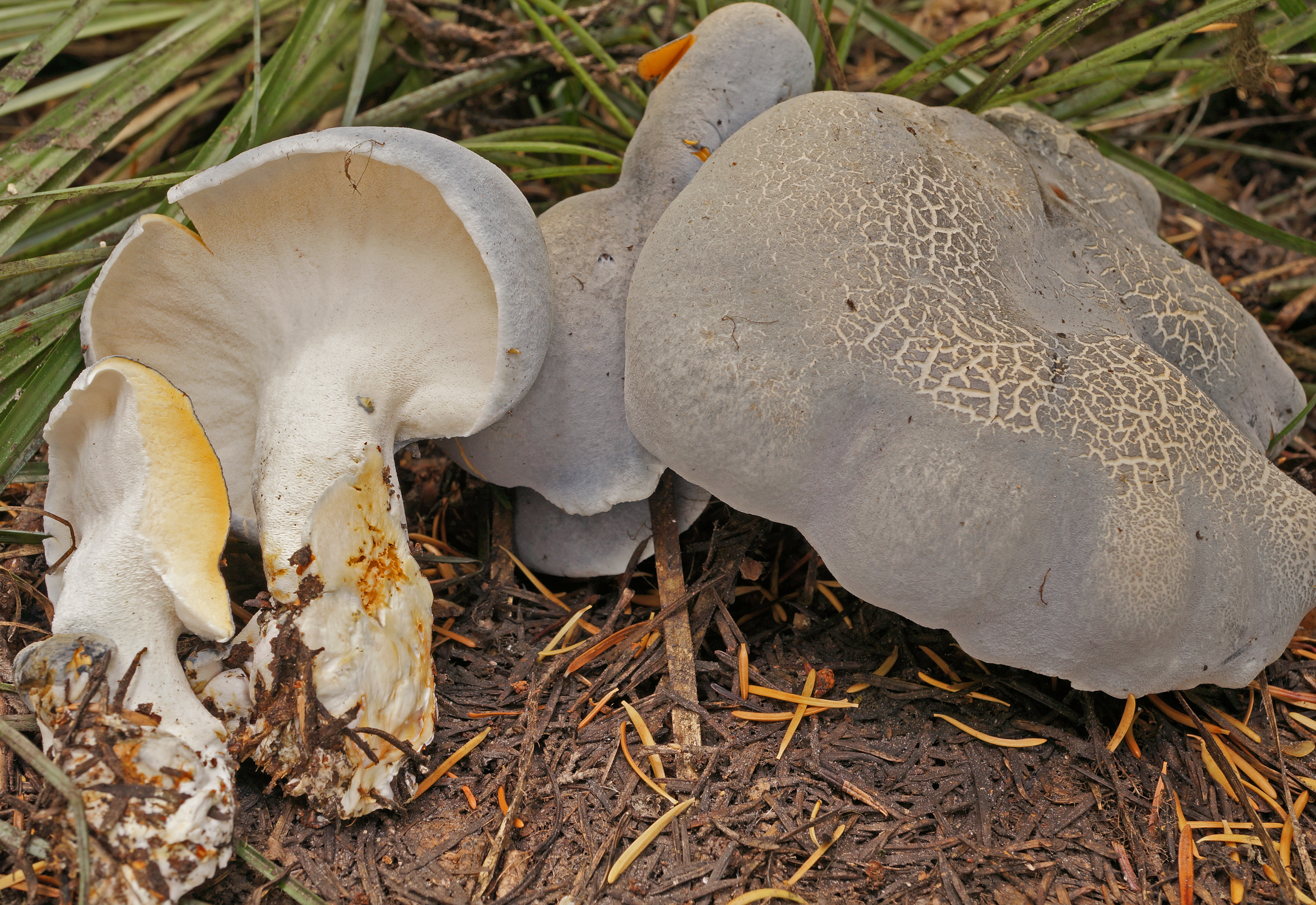
Albatrellus flettii

Species of Albatrellus are terrestrial, with fleshy fruit bodies that differentiate into caps and stipes; the stipe is either central or eccentric to lateral. Fruit bodies are solitary or in clusters with stem bases or cap margins fused. Context mostly tough-fleshy, white or becoming brightly colored. The hymenophore is regularly poroid. The hyphal system is monomitic, the generative hyphae septate with or without clamp connections, with thin or somewhat thick, amyloid or inamyloid, indextrinoid and acyanophilous walls; the majority of hyphae are distinctly inflated (the fundamental hyphae). The basidiospores are ellipsoid to roughly spherical in shape, thin-walled to slightly thick-walled, with smooth, amyloid or inamyloid, indextrinoid and acyanophilous walls.

== Distribution ==
Twelve species of Albatrellus occur in North America. The edible Albatrellus ovinus is sold commercially in Finland. The Dictionary of the Fungi estimates there to be 16 species in the genus, but three new species (A. fumosus, A. microcarpus, A. tibetanus) were described from China in 2008.

== Species ==
- Albatrellus avellaneus
- Albatrellus borneensis
- Albatrellus caeruleoporus (edible)
- Albatrellus cantharellus
- Albatrellus citrinus
- Albatrellus cochleariformis
- Albatrellus confluens
- Albatrellus congoensis
- Albatrellus cristatus
- Albatrellus ellisii (edible)
- Albatrellus flettii
- Albatrellus fumosus
- Albatrellus ginnsii
- Albatrellus hirtus
- Albatrellus microcarpus
- Albatrellus ovinus
- Albatrellus peckianus
- Albatrellus piceiphilus
- Albatrellus pilosus
- Albatrellus similis
- Albatrellus skamanius
- Albatrellus subrubescens
- Albatrellus syringae
- Albatrellus tianschanicus
- Albatrellus tibetanus
- Albatrellus yasudae
- Albatrellus yunnanensis
