= Albatrellus tianschanicus =

Scientific classification
- Kingdom: Fungi
- Division: Basidiomycota
- Class: Agaricomycetes
- Order: Russulales
- Family: Albatrellaceae
- Genus: Albatrellus
- Species: A. tianschanicus

Binomial name
- Albatrellus tianschanicus (Bondartsev) Pouzar (1966)

Synonyms
- Scutiger tianschanicus Bondartsev (1960); Albatrellus henanensis J.D.Zhao & X.Q.Zhang (1991)

Species of fungus

Albatrellus tianschanicus is a species of fungus in the family Albatrellaceae. It was originally described as Scutiger tianschanicus by Appollinaris Semenovich Bondartsev in 1960, and later transferred to the genus Albatrellus by Zdeněk Pouzar in 1960. Albatrellus henanensis, described in 1991, is a synonym.

== See also ==
Fuller comparative discussion at Albatrellus subrubescens
