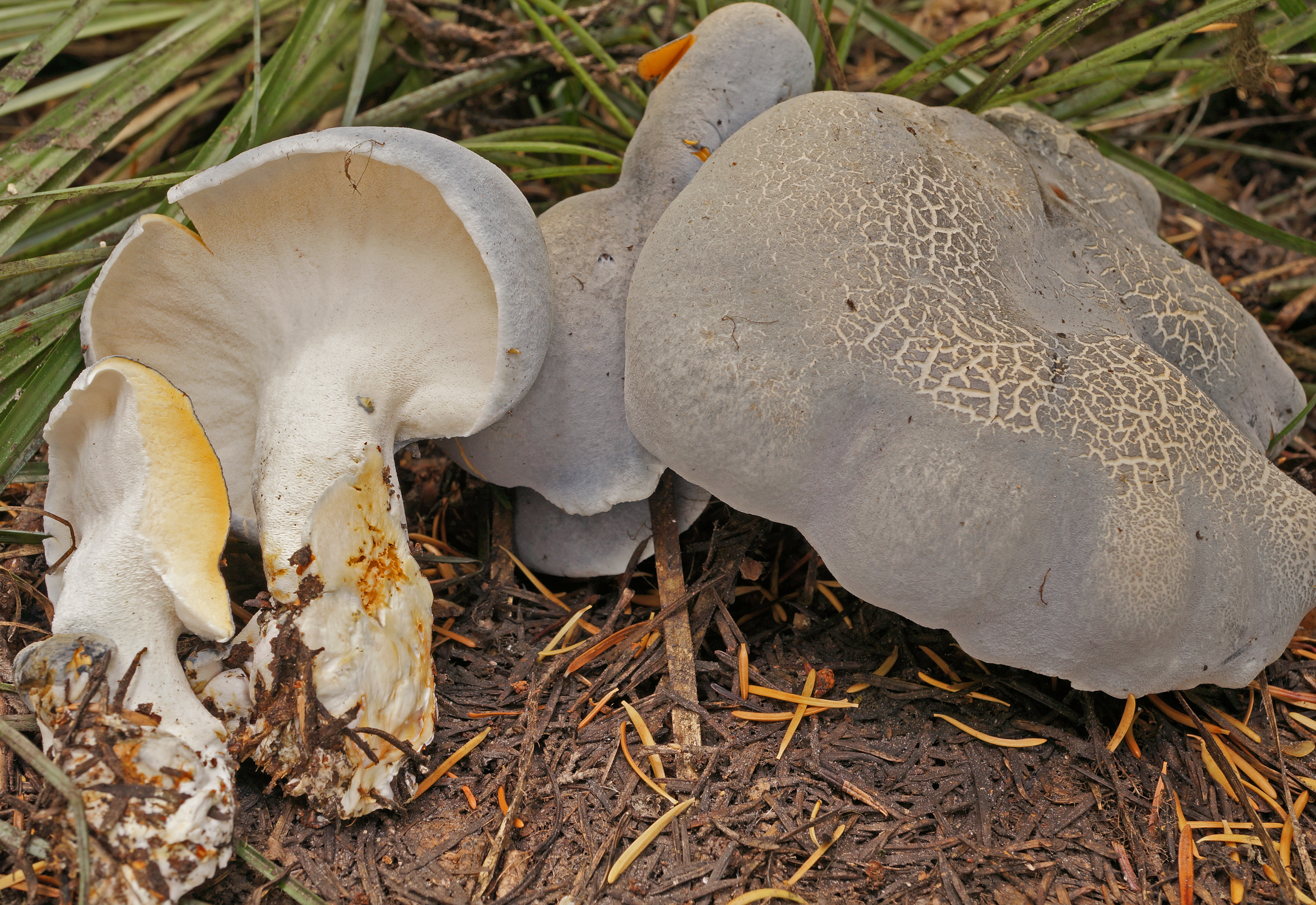

Conservation status
- Apparently Secure (NatureServe)

Scientific classification
- Kingdom: Fungi
- Division: Basidiomycota
- Class: Agaricomycetes
- Order: Russulales
- Family: Albatrellaceae
- Genus: Albatrellus
- Species: A. flettii

Binomial name
- Albatrellus flettii Morse ex Pouzar (1972)

Synonyms
- Polyporus flettii Morse (1941); Polypilus flettii (Morse ex Pouzar) Teixeira (1992); Albatrellopsis flettii (Morse ex Pouzar) Audet (2010)

= Albatrellus flettii =

Species of fungus

Albatrellus flettii, commonly known as the blue-capped polypore, is a species of fungus in the family Albatrellaceae.

== Taxonomy ==
The species was originally described in 1941 by Elizabeth Eaton Morse as Polyporus flettii, but this naming was invalid as it lacked a Latin description. Zdeněk Pouzar transferred it to Albatrellus in 1972.

== Description ==
The bluish to tan caps are 5–20 centimetres (2–8 in) wide and often include a pattern of small cracks revealing the light flesh. There are 1–4 white pores per millimetre, staining reddish with age. The tubes are decurrent and up to 7 mm long. The stalk is up to 15 cm long and 4 cm thick, solid, pale in youth and ochraceous in age. The spore print is white.

=== Similar species ===
Similar species include the typically smaller Neoalbatrellus caeruleoporus and N. subcaeruleoporus, as well as Osteina obducta and members of Polyozellus.

== Distribution and habitat ==
The species is found in western North America, where it grows on the ground in coniferous forests.

== Uses ==
The species is edible, but is probably not choice.
