= Albatrellus cantharellus =

Scientific classification
- Kingdom: Fungi
- Division: Basidiomycota
- Class: Agaricomycetes
- Order: Russulales
- Family: Albatrellaceae
- Genus: Albatrellus
- Species: A. cantharellus

Binomial name
- Albatrellus cantharellus (Lloyd) Pouzar (1972)

Synonyms
- Polyporus cantharellus Lloyd (1915)

Species of fungus

Albatrellus cantharellus is a species of fungus in the family Albatrellaceae. Originally described as a species of Polyporus by Curtis Gates Lloyd in 1915, it was transferred to the genus Albatrellus by Zdeněk Pouzar in 1972. It is found in Japan, and is missing. Thought to be extinct.

== See also ==
Extensive comparative discussion at Albatrellus subrubescens
