= Carroll William Dodge =

American botanist and mycologist (1895–1988)

- Born: 20 January 1895; Danby, Vermont
- Died: 21 July 1988 (aged 93)
- Education: Middlebury College; Washington University in St. Louis
- Scientific career
- Fields: Mycology
- Workplaces: Brown University; Harvard University; Washington University in St. Louis
- Author abbrev. (botany): C.W.Dodge

Carroll William Dodge (January 20, 1895 – July 21, 1988) was an American mycologist and lichenologist. His major fields of study included human and mammalian parasitic fungi, lichen-associated fungi, and fungi forming subterranean sporophores. His research and publications on Antarctic lichens were substantial, but not well received by the taxonomic community.

== Biography ==
=== Early life and education ===
Carroll William Dodge was born in Danby, Vermont. He started his early education from Burr and Burton Seminaries in Manchester, Vermont. He went to Middlebury College at Vermont to study classical language and there he received his Artium Baccalaureus in 1915 and completed his master's in 1916. During his stay at Middlebury, he came in contact with Edward Angus Burt (1859–1939) who was another mycologist, today known as an authority of terrestrial fungi, Thelephoraceae. Carroll was inspired by Burt and his interest grew in biology; he followed Burt to Washington University in St. Louis, Missouri as a Lachland Fellow. He was so interested in botany that he left Rhodes scholarship to Oxford University, withdrew his nomination and went to Washington University to complete his doctorate. He did his PhD in plant physiology and biochemistry under Benjamin M. Duggar in 1918.

After his PhD, he served in US Army as a specialist in Office of Nutrition, Camp Pevon, Massachusetts during 1918–1919. After one year of service in the US Army, he worked as an associated chemist in Dairy Division of United States Department of Agriculture (USDA).

=== Academic career ===
Dodge again joined academia in 1919 as an instructor in botany at Brown University in Rhode Island and took a class in phycology. There he became Onley Assistant Professor of Botany and finally he entered Harvard in 1921 as an instructor in botany and became assistant professor and Curator of Farlow Library of Herbarium in 1924. He doubled the herbarium collection during his stay in the library by purchasing adding from his own collection. Today, he is considered as one of the important collector of lichen in Farlow Library of Herbarium. During his stay in Harvard, from the mid-1920s he started studying fungal diseases in human and collected a lot of information such that he offered the first course in medical mycology in America. In 1931, Dodge was head of the International Association of Plant Taxonomists Section on Lichens. That year, he became professor of botany at Washington University. Some of his students included Edward Cain Berry, George A. Llano, and Emanuel David Rudolph. During his tenure he visited several Latin American countries, such as Panama, Costa Rica, Guatemala, Chile and Brazil, where he taught several courses in medical mycology and lichenology. His interest in human pathogenic fungi lead to the publication of a very popular book "Medical Mycology" in 1935. In 1950, he was vice-president for Medical Mycology of the Rio de Janeiro International Congress of Microbiology.

He finally retired in 1963.

=== Lichen taxonomy ===
Another area of Dodge's study is lichenology. He is regarded as an American authority on tropical and Antarctic lichens. He mainly focused in taxonomy and floristics of lichens. He developed keys for lichen identification. His peak period of lichen study was from 1950 to the 1960s. Dodge traveled extensively to study lichens and produced many publications related to lichens of different locations. He published articles describing the lichens of tropical Africa, Gaspe Peninsula, Venezuela, Brazil, Tonga, Chile, Kerguelen Island, and New Zealand.

He was funded by National science museum for his trip to Antarctica in 1961. He studied lichens for several years in Antarctica and published a book Lichen Flora of the Antarctic Continent and Adjacent Islands in 1973. The book, however, was not well-received by his contemporaries. In one review of a later publication on Antarctic lichens, a reviewer described Dodge's "idiosyncratic monograph" as "for its users, more a source of frustration than information". Elke Mackenzie described the work as "dubious" scholarship. In a critical revision of lichens described by Dodge in that 1973 publication, Miris Castello and Pier Luigi Nimis concluded that only about 20% of the approximately 150 species he described in that work were still accepted as valid. This analysis corroborated a previous prediction that about 80% of Dodge's taxa would turn out to be invalid.

Dodge also studied about subterranean sporophores. Research articles related to Rhizopogonaceae, Gauiteria, Arcangeliella, Gymnomyces and Macromanites, Leucogastor and Leucophlebs were found during his early academic life.

== Awards and affiliations ==
Dodge's honors include: election to Phi Beta Kappa, Sigma Xi, and Gamma Alpha (National Councilor, 1923–1928; National Secretary, 1927); doctorates by the Universidad Nacional de Guatemala (1942) and the Universidad Nacional de Chile (1950); perpetual honorary member of the Societe Linneenne de Lyon, and the American Microscopical Society (and Centennial Award, 1978). He received the medal of the Society of Medical Mycologists of the Americas in 1976.

The list of Dodge's organizational affiliations includes: American Association for the Advancement of Science, the New England Botanical Club, the Botanical Society of America (chairman of mycology, 1920s), the British Mycological Society, the American Microscopical Society (vice-president, 1938), and the American Phytopathological Society. He also served on the editorial boards of Botanical Abstracts, Biological Abstracts, and Rhodora.

== Personal life ==
Besides mycology and biology, Carroll William Dodge was interested in Latin American history and literature. This can be known by his appointment as Harvard University Librarian to purchase literary and historical volumes in many countries he visited. He could read and write in both classical and modern languages. Further, he could give lectures in fluent Spanish and Portuguese. In 1925, Dodge married Bertha Sanford Wiener, who was a daughter of Leo Wiener, his Russian Professor at Harvard. Dodge's wife was also an author of several books in economic botany, popular science and exploration. They had two daughters Anne Caroline Dodge Hooper and Mary Lavina Dodge Cobb, both of whom were musically talented.

Carroll William Dodge died on July 21, 1988, in Vermont.

== Publications ==
More than seventy scholarly articles written by Dodge can be found between 1918 and 1982. Similarly, as many as eighty books written by Dodge can be found. Although most of his books are written in English, some books are in Spanish, French and German.

== See also ==
- Category:Taxa named by Carroll William Dodge
