= Albatrellus piceiphilus =

Scientific classification
- Domain: Eukaryota
- Kingdom: Fungi
- Division: Basidiomycota
- Class: Agaricomycetes
- Order: Russulales
- Family: Albatrellaceae
- Genus: Albatrellus
- Species: A. piceiphilus

Binomial name
- Albatrellus piceiphilus B.K.Cui & Y.C.Dai (2008)

Species of fungus

Albatrellus piceiphilus is a species of fungus in the family Albatrellaceae. Found in Picea crassifolia forest in Gansu Province, China, it was described as new to science in 2008. Molecular analysis shows that it groups in a "Russuloid" clade with Albatrellus citrinus and A. ovinus.
