= Audet =

Audet is a surname. Notable people with the surname include:

- Antoine Audet, Canadian politician in Quebec, Canada
- Aurèle Audet (1920–2015), Canadian politician in Quebec, Canada
- Consuelo Portela Audet (1885–1959), Cuban-born Spanish cuplé singer
- Earl Audet (1921–2002), American football offensive lineman
- Francis-Joseph Audet (1867–1954), American-born Canadian historian and archivist
- Jean-Paul Audet (1918–1993), French Canadian academic and philosopher
- Marie-Claude Audet (born 1962), Canadian cyclist
- Martine Audet (born 1961), Canadian poet
- Michel Audet (born 1940), Canadian economist and a politician in Quebec, Canada
- Nicodème Audet (1822–1905), merchant and political figure in Quebec
- Philippe Audet (born 1977), Canadian ice hockey player
- Rebecca Audet, American politician
- René Audet (1920–2011), Canadian Roman Catholic bishop
- Richard Joseph Audet (1922–1945), Canadian fighter pilot during World War II
- Viola Cole-Audet (1883 – July 31, 1936) was an American pianist, composer, and music educator
- Viviane Audet (born 1981), Canadian actress, singer and pianist

== See also ==
- Audit (disambiguation)
- Audette, surname
