= Scutiger =

Scutiger may refer to:

- Scutiger (fungus), a genus of fungi in the family Albatrellaceae
- Scutiger (frog), a genus of toads in the family Megophryidae
