= S. brasiliensis =

S. brasiliensis may refer to:

- Salminus brasiliensis, the golden dorado, a large river fish species found in South America
- Scomberomorus brasiliensis, the Serra Spanish mackerel, a fish species found in the Atlantic
- Scutiger brasiliensis, a fungus species in the genus Scutiger
- Senecio brasiliensis, the flor-das-almas, a perennial plant species native to the fields and meadows of central South America
- Sinningia brasiliensis, a flowering plant in the genus Sinningia
- Sphenodiscus brasiliensis, an extinct ammonite species with fossils found along the banks of the Rio Gramame in Brazil
- Sylvilagus brasiliensis, the Tapeti, Brazilian rabbit or forest rabbit, a cottontail rabbit species found in Central and South America

== Synonyms ==
- Scymnus brasiliensis, a synonym for Isistius brasiliensis, the cookiecutter shark, a shark species
