= Fevansia =

Conservation status
- Endangered (IUCN 3.1)

- Imperiled (NatureServe)

Scientific classification
- Kingdom: Fungi
- Division: Basidiomycota
- Class: Agaricomycetes
- Order: Russulales
- Family: Albatrellaceae
- Genus: Fevansia; Trappe & Castellano (2000)
- Species: F. aurantiaca

Binomial name
- Fevansia aurantiaca Trappe & Castellano (2000)

Genus of fungi

Fevansia is a fungal genus in the family Albatrellaceae. A monotypic genus, it contains the single rare truffle-like species Fevansia aurantiaca, found in old-growth forests of Oregon. The name Fevansia honors Frank Evans of the North American Truffling Society, who collected the holotype specimen. Aurantiaca is Latin for "pale orange", referring to the color of the peridium.

== Description ==
Truffles are fungi that have evolved to be hypogeous, or below the ground, and thus they have reduced morphological features. Some of the features commonly analyzed on truffles are the peridium, or the outside, the gleba, which is the inner tissue which contains the spores, and the spores themselves.

The peridium of Fevansia is 100–200 μm thick. The gleba is firm and moist and the color is pale orange with either a pink or an orange tint. The spores are 10–13 by 3.5–5 μm, spindle-shaped, and smooth and appear in large groups to be gray-yellow and appear pale yellow when observed singly.

== Classification ==
The fungus was originally classified as a member of the family Rhizopogonaceae (order Boletales) because of its general morphological similarity to the genera Alpova and Rhizopogon section Rhizopogonella. Recent (2013) molecular phylogenetic analysis, however, indicates that Fevansia is a member of the family Albatrellaceae in the order Russulales. For this reason, it is suspected to be mycorrhizal (like all other known Albatrellus species), although this has not yet been confirmed.

== Habitat, distribution, and ecology ==
Fevansia aurentiaca truffles are found in the Pacific Northwest but are uncommon. Truffles are hypogeous by nature, leading to a certain degree of difficulty in finding them. As a result, there are few specimens available for genetic analysis. Most of the Fevansia specimens can be found in the Mycological Herbarium of Oregon State University.

Truffles are most commonly found in forest ecosystems, where they form symbiotic relationships with trees, one example of this symbiotic relationship is ectomycorrhiza (ECM). While most truffles form ectomycorrhizal relationships, it is unclear is this is true of F. aurentiaca. There are no DNA matches to ECM root tips that suggests Fevasia forms these relationships. It is most likely, however, because it is most often found under ECM forming Pinaceae. The new DNA evidence that puts Fevansia in the Albatrellaceae also suggests that it is an ECM symbiont, like most members of that family.

== See also ==
- List of fungi by conservation status
