= Kate Murray (New Hampshire politician) =

American politician

Member of the New Hampshire House of Representatives from the Rockingham 22nd district
- In office December 7, 2022 – August 3, 2026
- Succeeded by: Rebecca Audet (elect)

Member of the New Hampshire House of Representatives from the Rockingham 24th district
- In office December 7, 2016 – December 7, 2022

Personal details
- Party: Democratic

Kate Murray is an American politician. She served as a Democratic member for the Rockingham 22nd district of the New Hampshire House of Representatives.
