= Audette =

Audette is a surname. Notable people with the surname include:

- Donald Audette (born 1969), Canadian ice hockey forward
- Julien Joseph Audette (1914–1989), Canadian aviator
- Louis Audette (1907–1995), Canadian lawyer, soldier and civil servant
- Michèle Audette (born 1971), Canadian politician and Native American activist
- Yvonne Audette (born 1930), Australian abstract artist

== See also ==
- Audet, surname
