= Mycolevis =

Scientific classification
- Kingdom: Fungi
- Division: Basidiomycota
- Class: Agaricomycetes
- Order: Russulales
- Family: Albatrellaceae
- Genus: Mycolevis; A.H.Sm. (1965)

Type species
- Mycolevis siccigleba A.H.Sm. (1965)

Genus of fungi

Mycolevis is a fungal genus in the family Albatrellaceae. A monotypic genus, it contains the single truffle-like species Mycolevis siccigleba, found in North America. American mycologist Alexander H. Smith described this genus and species in 1965.
