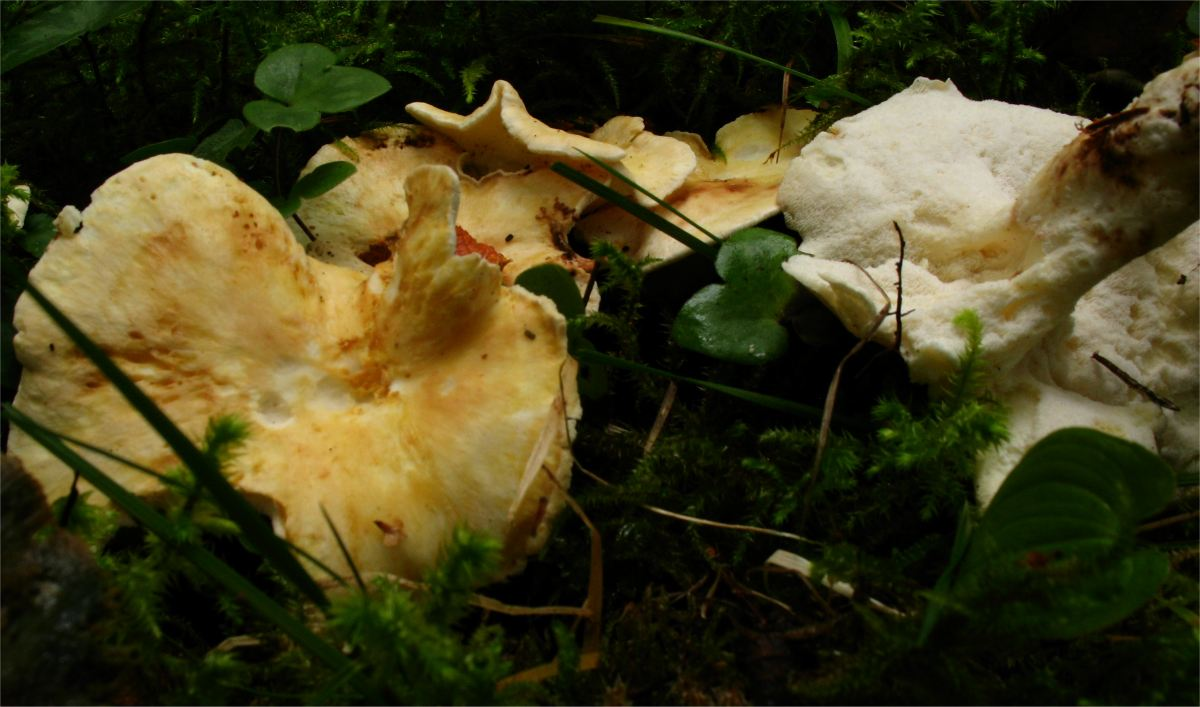

Scientific classification
- Kingdom: Fungi
- Division: Basidiomycota
- Class: Agaricomycetes
- Order: Russulales
- Family: Albatrellaceae
- Genus: Albatrellus
- Species: A. citrinus

Binomial name
- Albatrellus citrinus Ryman (2003)

= Albatrellus citrinus =

Species of fungus

Albatrellus citrinus is an uncommon, lemon-yellow mushroom-forming fungus species in the family Albatrellaceae, first described in 2003. Initially confused with the North American species Albatrellus subrubescens, this European fungus was distinguished through careful examination of its physical characteristics and DNA analysis. The mushroom forms fleshy, stool-like or bracket-shaped structures with caps measuring 5–15 centimetres across that start pale cream and develop yellow-orange hues with age, featuring small round pores on their undersides and mild-tasting white flesh that yellows when exposed to air. Primarily found in lime-rich soils under spruce trees in northern Europe, including Sweden and the Czech Republic, this fungus has also been discovered at high elevations in Tibet, where it maintains its ecological relationship with spruce trees in mountainous environments.

== Taxonomy ==
Albatrellus citrinus is a yellow-coloured polypore fungus in the family Albatrellaceae. It was described as a new species in 2003 by Svengunnar Ryman. The species name citrinus refers to its lemon-yellow hues. This mushroom was initially recognized as a European counterpart of the North American Albatrellus subrubescens, but analysis of morphology and DNA showed it to be distinct.

== Description ==
Albatrellus citrinus produces fleshy, annual fruiting bodies that are stool-like or bracket-like. The cap is initially pale cream but becomes light yellow to yellow-orange with age (often with a slight brown bruising). Caps range from 5–15 cm across, convex to flat, with a smooth to slightly cracked surface. Unlike A. subrubescens, it lacks dark reddish spots on the cap; instead it often shows uniform yellowing with age. The pore surface underneath is whitish to pale yellow, with small round pores (3–4 per mm). The stipe, if present, is short and off-centre. The flesh is white, turning yellowish on exposure. The taste is mild (distinguishing it from the bitter A. subrubescens). Microscopically it has generative hyphae with clamps and ellipsoid, hyaline spores about 4–5 by 3–4 μm.

== Habitat and distribution ==
Albatrellus citrinus is an ectomycorrhizal fungus associated mainly with spruce (Picea abies) in calcareous soils. It has been found in montane coniferous forests and alvar (limestone) woodlands in northern Europe. The species was first identified in Sweden, where it occurs in lime-rich spruce forests (type locality in Dalarna, Sweden). A year later, the fungus was later reported from Tibet at an elevation of 3200 m, where it was growing under Picea. In 2018, it was recorded in the Czech Republic.
