= Grifolin =

Names
- Preferred IUPAC name 5-Methyl-2-[(2E,6E)-3,7,11-trimethyldodeca-2,6,10-trien-1-yl]benzene-1,3-diol

Identifiers
CAS Number	6903-07-7
3D model (JSmol)	Interactive image
ChEMBL	ChEMBL487804
ChemSpider	4522608
PubChem CID	5372312
UNII	5P6UA2GF78
CompTox Dashboard (EPA)	DTXSID401044417
- InChI: InChI=1S/C22H32O2/c1-16(2)8-6-9-17(3)10-7-11-18(4)12-13-20-21(23)14-19(5)15-22(20)24/h8,10,12,14-15,23-24H,6-7,9,11,13H2,1-5H3/b17-10+,18-12+ Key: PZHNKNRPGLTZPO-VZRGJMDUSA-N; InChI=1/C22H32O2/c1-16(2)8-6-9-17(3)10-7-11-18(4)12-13-20-21(23)14-19(5)15-22(20)24/h8,10,12,14-15,23-24H,6-7,9,11,13H2,1-5H3/b17-10+,18-12+ Key: PZHNKNRPGLTZPO-VZRGJMDUBE
- SMILES: CC1=CC(=C(C(=C1)O)C/C=C(\C)/CC/C=C(\C)/CCC=C(C)C)O

Properties
Chemical formula	C_{22}H_{32}O_{2}
Molar mass	328.496 g·mol^{−1}
Melting point	41 °C (106 °F; 314 K)
- Except where otherwise noted, data are given for materials in their standard state (at 25 °C [77 °F], 100 kPa). Infobox references

Grifolin is an isolate of the mushroom Albatrellus confluens which upregulates DAPK1 in vitro.
