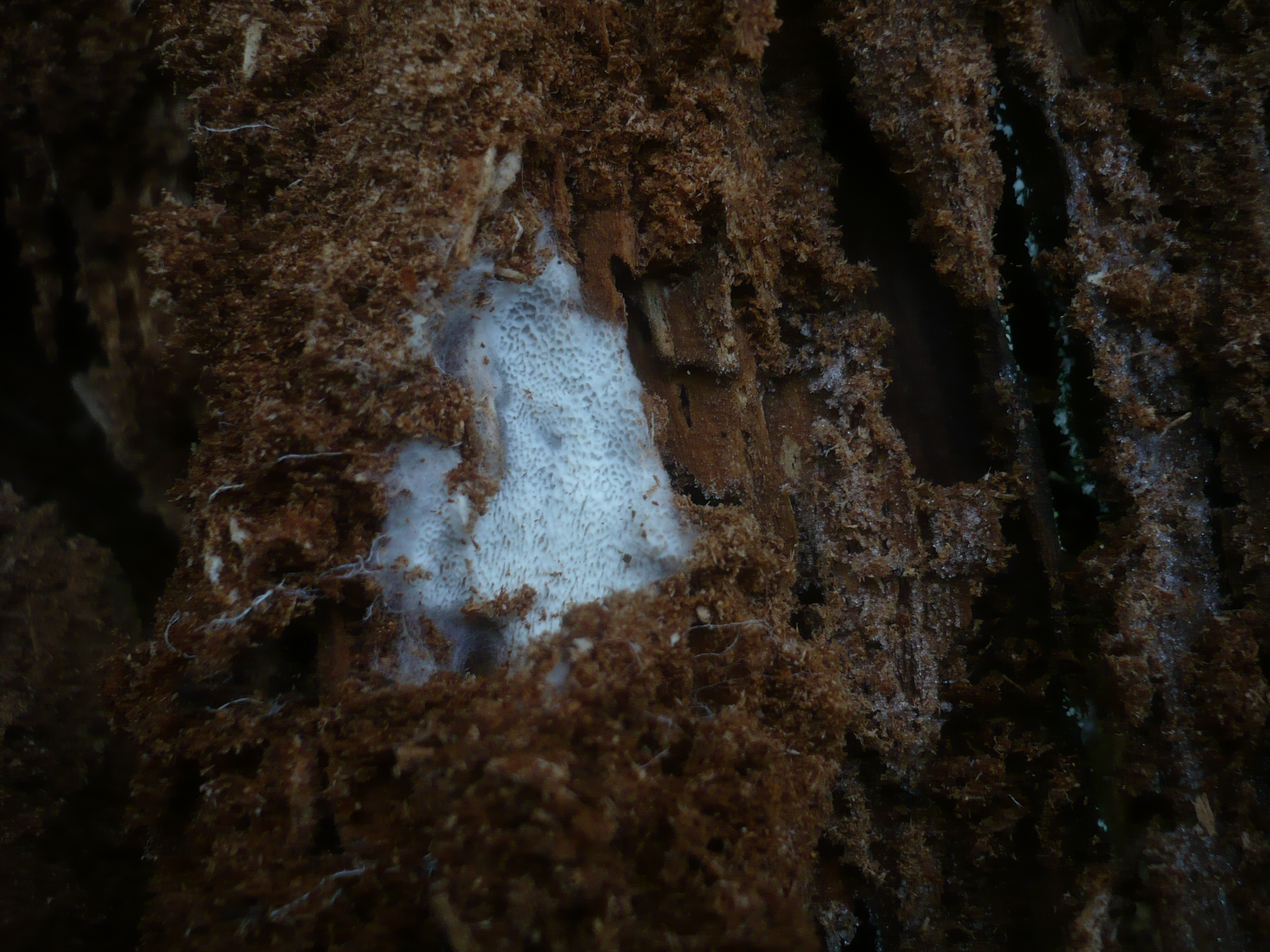
- Byssoporia terrestris

Scientific classification
- Kingdom: Fungi
- Division: Basidiomycota
- Class: Agaricomycetes
- Order: Russulales
- Family: Albatrellaceae
- Genus: Byssoporia; M.J.Larsen & Zak (1978)
- Species: B. terrestris

Binomial name
- Byssoporia terrestris (DC.) M.J.Larsen & Zak (1978)

Synonyms
- Boletus terrestris DC. (1815); Polyporus terrestris (DC.) Fr. (1821); Physisporus terrestris (DC.) Chevallier (1826); Poria terrestris (DC.) Sacc. (1888); Byssocorticium terrestre (DC.) Bondartsev & Singer ex Bondartsev (1953); Rigidoporus terrestris (DC.) Ryvarden (1973)

= Byssoporia =

Genus of fungi

Byssoporia is a fungal genus in the family Albatrellaceae. The genus is monotypic, containing the single widespread corticioid species Byssoporia terrestris. There are several varieties: sartoryi, lilacinorosea, aurantiaca, sublutea, and parksii. These differ in bruising reaction, presence of clamp connections in the hyphae, or hyphal morphology. It was previously thought to belong in the Atheliaceae, but a molecular phylogenetics found it to belong in the Albatrellaceae.
