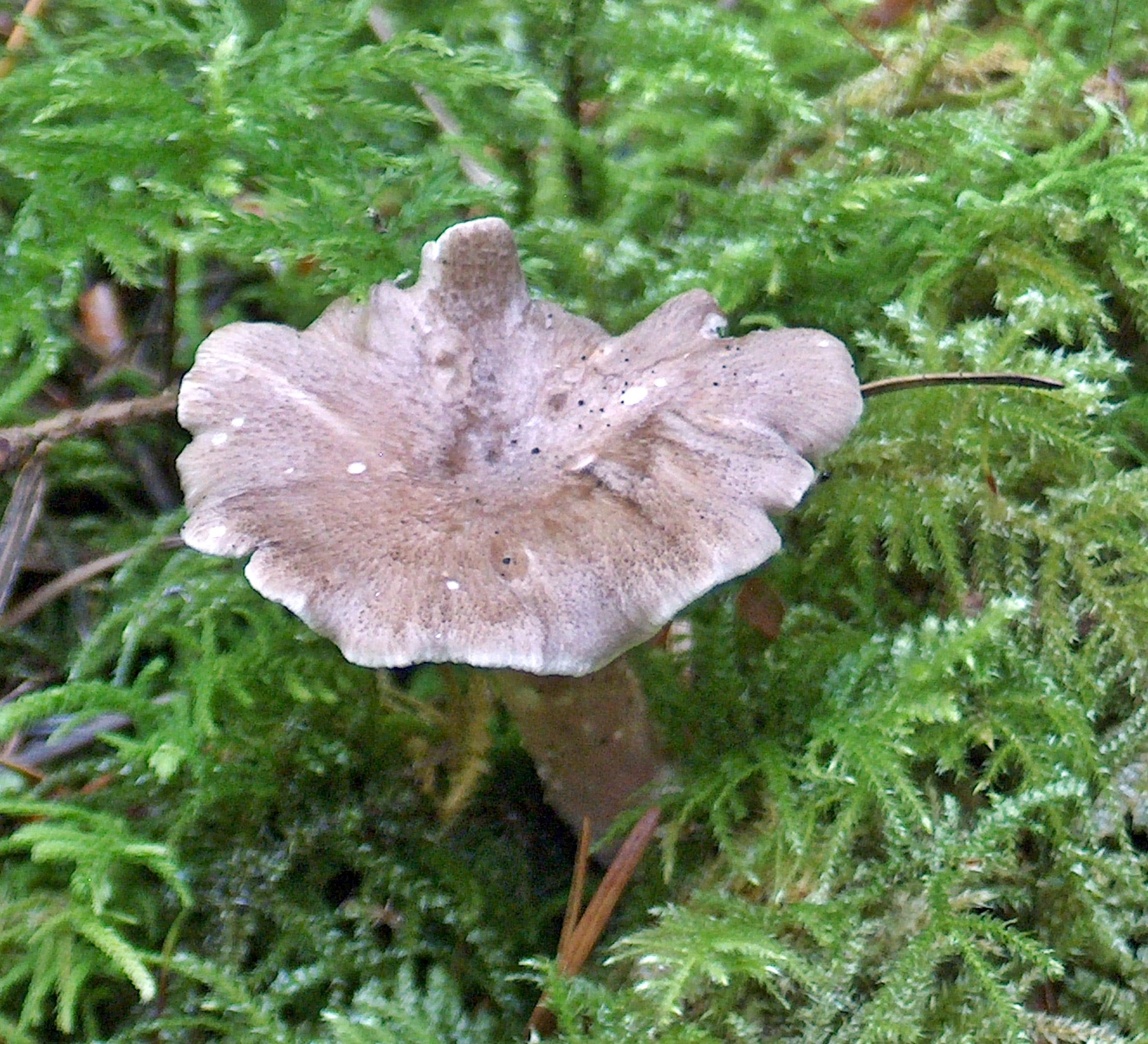

Scientific classification
- Kingdom: Fungi
- Division: Basidiomycota
- Class: Agaricomycetes
- Order: Russulales
- Family: Albatrellaceae
- Genus: Polyporoletus; Snell (1936)

Type species
- Polyporoletus sublividus Snell (1936)

Species
- P. sublividus P. neotropicus

= Polyporoletus =

Genus of fungi

Polyporoletus is a genus of fungi in the family Albatrellaceae. The genus was first described by mycologist Walter H. Snell in 1936 to accommodate an unusual terrestrial polypore with a stipe that had been found in the ground in pine-oak woods in Fentress County, Tennessee. He named this specimen Polyporoletus sublividus; the generic name refers to the possible relationship to both the boletes and the polypores. Although this species would be later transferred to the genus Scutiger, it is now considered to be Polyporoletus. Currently there are two other species in the genus, P. neotropicus Mata & Ryvarden (2007) and P. sylvestris (Overh. ex Pouzar) Audet, (2010)
