= Elizabeth Eaton Morse =

Botanist (1864-1955)

Elizabeth Eaton Morse

Elizabeth Eaton Morse (31 December 1864 – 13 November 1955) was an American mycologist. Born in Framingham, Massachusetts, she graduated from Ashland, Massachusetts, High School in 1882. For seven years she taught in elementary school before entering Wellesley College, from which she graduated with a diploma from the School of Art in 1891. After twenty years of teaching in the New York City schools Morris High School and Roosevelt High School, she returned to Wellesley College in 1924 and earned a degree in Botany in 1926. Shortly after, she registered as a part-time graduate student in the Department of Botany at the University of California, and was given storage and work space to pursue her interests in cryptogamic botany.

Although she did not work towards an advanced degree, Morse maintained this space for her studies for more than twenty years. During this time, she organized the California Mycological Society as a means to promote the collection and exchange of mycological specimens. She often spent summers on collecting trips throughout North America, and between trips identified, catalogued and distributed her collections. Although primarily interested in macroscopic fungi, she also collected some flowering plants, slime molds, lichens, and mosses. The bulk of her collections now resides at either the University Herbarium at the University of California at Berkeley, or in the U.S. National Fungus Collections at Beltsville, Maryland. Morse died 13 November 1955 in Berkeley, California.

Fungal taxa named by Morse include Albatrellus flettii, Calbovista, Cantharellus bonarii, Cantharellus wilkinsiae, and Tricholoma sclerotoideum.

== Publications ==
- Morse, E.E. (1930). "A new chanterelle in California". Mycologia. 22 (5): 219–220. doi:10.1080/00275514.1930.12017003.
- Morse, E.E. (1933). "A study of the genus Podaxis". Mycologia. 25 (1): 1–33. doi:10.1080/00275514.1933.12020646. JSTOR 3754126.
- Morse, E.E. (1935). "A new puffball". Mycologia. 27 (2): 96–101. doi:10.1080/00275514.1935.12017065.
- Morse, E.E. (1943). "Study of a new Tricholoma". Mycologia. 35 (5): 573–581. doi:10.1080/00275514.1943.12017515.
- Morse, E.E. (1945). "Some western Discomycetes, Gyromitra esculenta, Helvella lacunosa". Mycologia. 37 (4): 414–424. doi:10.2307/3754628. JSTOR 3754628.
- Smith, A.H.; Morse, E.E. (1947). "The genus Cantharellus in the western United States". Mycologia. 39 (5): 497–534. doi:10.1080/00275514.1947.12017631. PMID 20264537.

== See also ==
- List of mycologists
