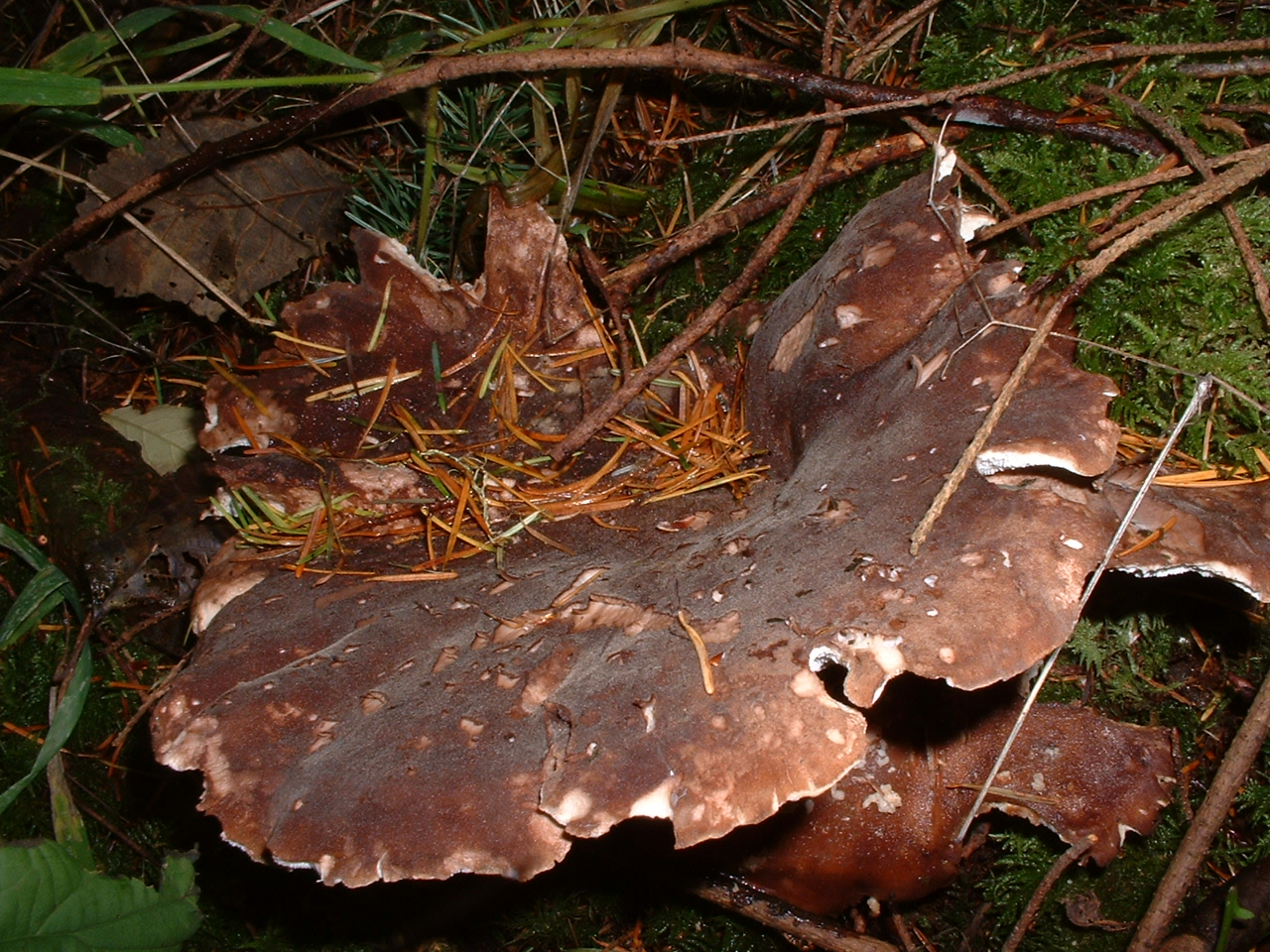
- Jahnoporus hirtus

Scientific classification
- Kingdom: Fungi
- Division: Basidiomycota
- Class: Agaricomycetes
- Order: Russulales
- Family: Albatrellaceae
- Genus: Jahnoporus; Nuss (1980)

Type species
- Jahnoporus hirtus (Quél.) Nuss (1980)

Species
- J. hirtus J. pekingensis

= Jahnoporus =

Genus of fungi

Jahnoporus is a genus of fungi in the family Albatrellaceae. There are two species in the genus, which have a widespread distribution in northern temperate regions. The type species, J. hirtus, was transferred to this genus in 1980; it was formerly known as Piptoporus hirtus.

The genus name of Jahnoporus is in honour of Hermann Jahn (1911 - 1987) German teacher, Ornithologist and Botanist (Mycology).

The genus was circumscribed by Ingo Nuss in Hoppea vol.39 on page 176 in 1980.
