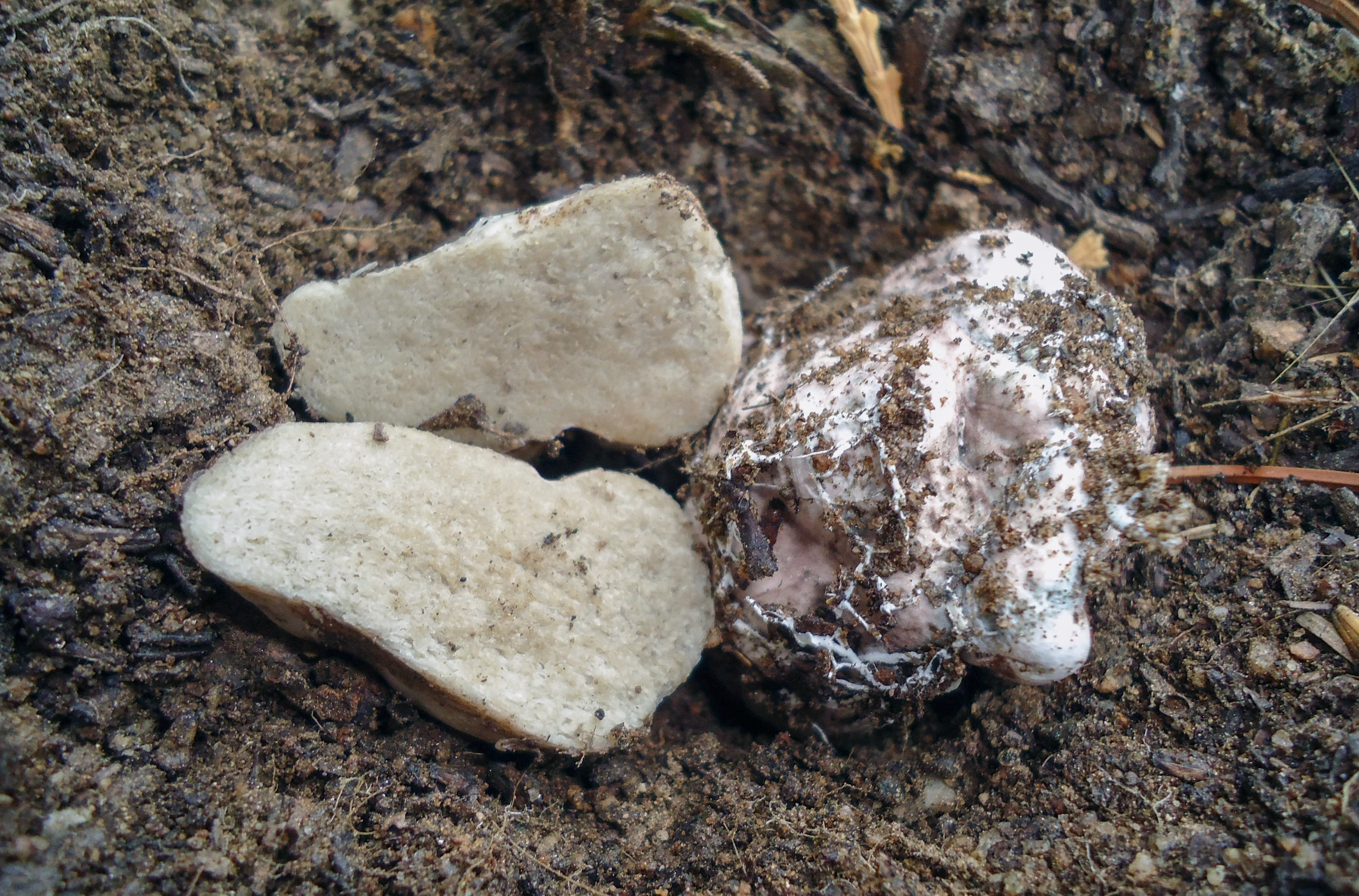
- Leucophleps spinispora

Scientific classification
- Kingdom: Fungi
- Division: Basidiomycota
- Class: Agaricomycetes
- Order: Russulales
- Family: Albatrellaceae
- Genus: Leucophleps; Harkn. (1899)

Type species
- Leucophleps magnata Harkn. (1899)

Species
- L. aculeatispora; L. levispora; L. magnata; L. spinispora

Synonyms
- Cremeogaster Mattir. (1924)

= Leucophleps =

Genus of fungi

Leucophleps is a genus of truffle-like fungi in the family Albatrellaceae. The genus, widespread in northern temperate regions, contains four species. Leucophleps was circumscribed by American mycologist Harvey Willson Harkness in 1899.
