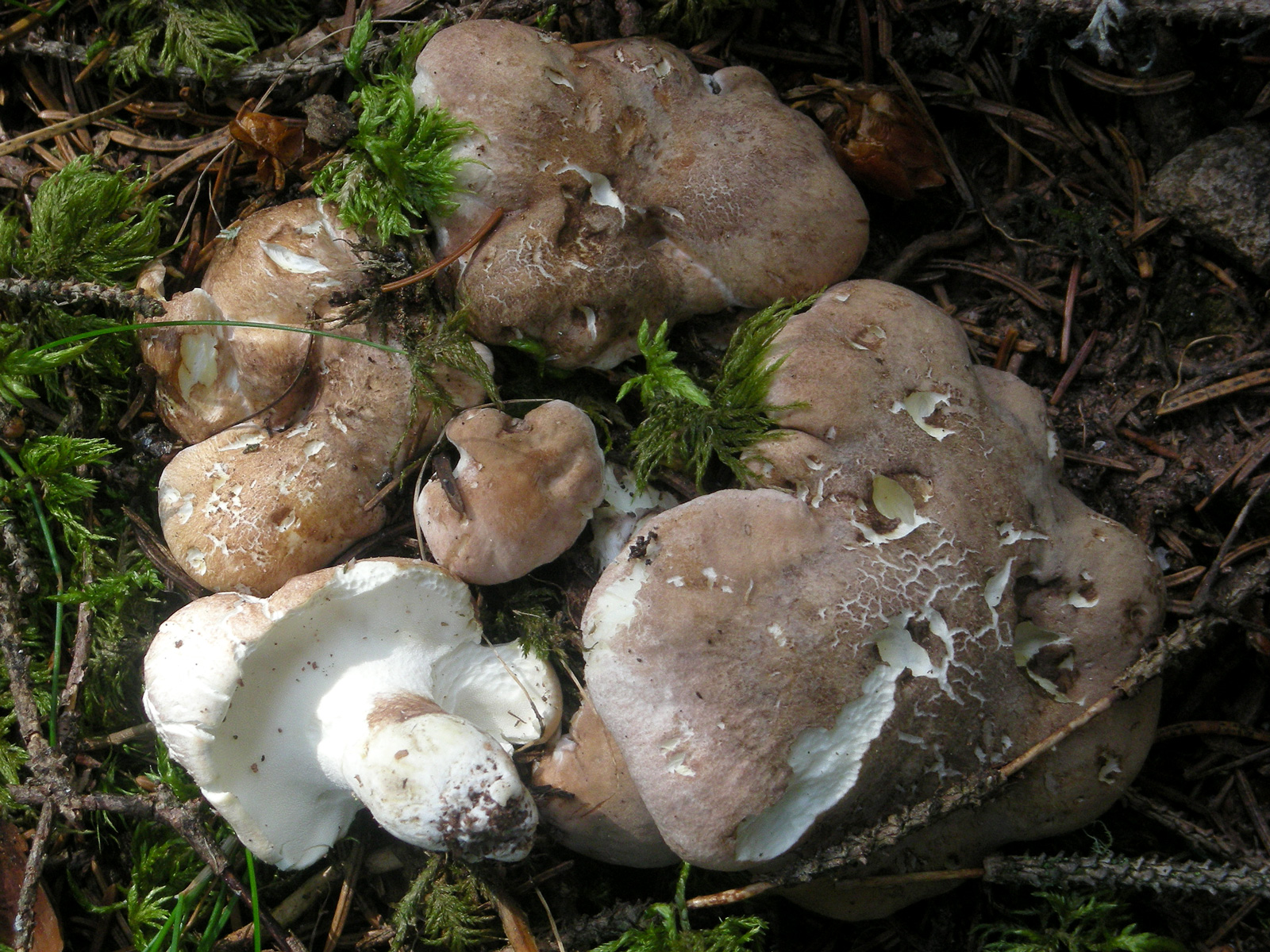

Scientific classification
- Domain: Eukaryota
- Kingdom: Fungi
- Division: Basidiomycota
- Class: Agaricomycetes
- Order: Russulales
- Family: Albatrellaceae
- Genus: Albatrellus
- Species: A. ovinus

Binomial name
- Albatrellus ovinus (Schaeff.) Kotl. & Pouzar

Synonyms
- Scutiger ovinus (Schaeff.) Murrill; Polyporus ovinus (Schaeff.) Fr.

= Albatrellus ovinus =

Species of fungus

Albatrellus ovinus Mycological characteristics
- Pores on hymenium
- Cap is convex or flat
- Hymenium is decurrent
- Stipe is bare
- Spore print is white
- Ecology is mycorrhizal
- Edibility is edible

Albatrellus ovinus is a terrestrial fungus found in Europe and North America. Although commonly known as sheep polypore, this fungus is not phylogenetically related to Polyporales (shelf fungi).

It similar to A. subrubescens, from which it may be distinguished microscopically.

== Description ==
The cap is 4–20 centimetres (1 1/2–8 in) wide, convex then flat or depressed, and white then tan or pinkish. The surface is dry and smooth but cracks with age. The whitish stalk is 2.5–10 cm (1–4 in) tall and 1–4 cm (3/8–1 5/8 in) wide, perhaps branching, with an equal or larger base. The spore print is white.

=== Similar species ===
The inedible, closely related and comparatively rare Albatrellus subrubescens has subtle color differences from A. ovinus, and the only spores of the former are amyloid.

Also similar are Albatrellus flettii, Jahnoporus hirtus, Scutiger ellisii, and S. pes-caprae.

== Distribution and habitat ==
It is found in northern Europe and in North America. In the latter, it is found from the Pacific Northwest to Northern California, in addition to the Mountain states, the Great Lakes area, the Appalachians, and the Northeast.

== Uses ==
The species may be edible if cooked thoroughly, but is typically slimy and may have a laxative effect. It is not recommended by some guides.

It is sold commercially in Finland.
