= Rebecca Audet =

American politician

Member-elect of the New Hampshire House of Representatives from the Rockingham 22nd district
- Assuming office December 2026
- Succeeding: Kate Murray

Personal details
- Party: Democratic

Rebecca Audet is an American politician. A member of the Democratic Party, she is the member-elect for the Rockingham 22nd district of the New Hampshire House of Representatives.
