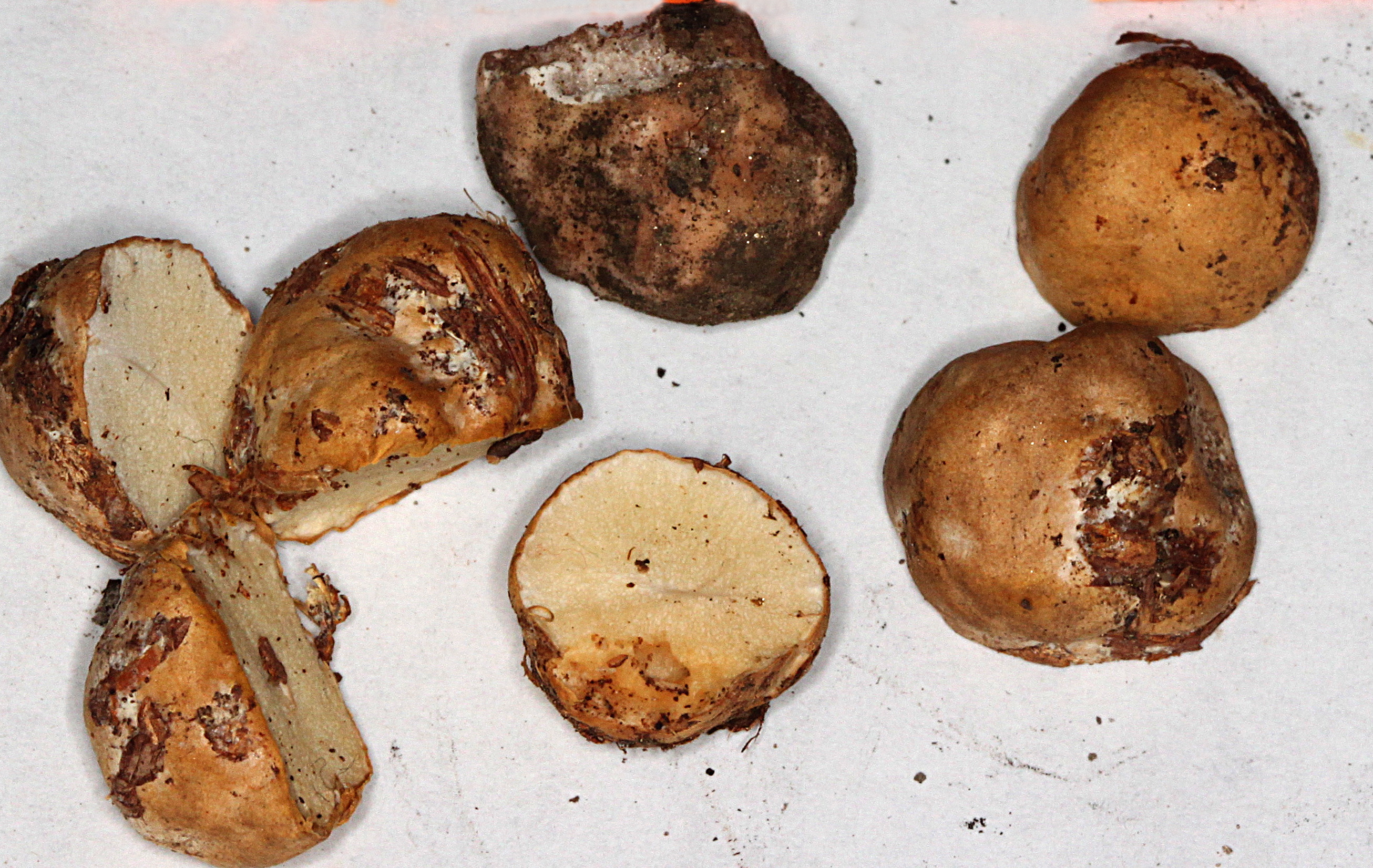

Scientific classification
- Kingdom: Fungi
- Division: Basidiomycota
- Class: Agaricomycetes
- Order: Russulales
- Family: Albatrellaceae
- Genus: Leucogaster; R.Hesse (1882)

Type species
- Leucogaster liosporus R.Hesse (1882)

Species
- L. candidus; L. citrinus; L. foveolatus; L. liosporus; L. meridionalis; L. nudus; L. odoratus; L. rubescens

= Leucogaster =

Genus of fungi

Leucogaster is a fungal genus in the family Albatrellaceae. The genus, widespread in northern temperate regions, contains about 20 truffle-like species. Some, such as L. rubescens, are edible.
