= Richard Audet =

Canadian fighter pilot

Richard Audet DFC*
- Enlisting photo
- Born: Richard Joseph Audet; 13 March 1922; Lethbridge, Alberta, Canada
- Died: 3 March 1945 (aged 22); Coesfeld, Nazi Germany
- Military career
- Allegiance: Canada
- Branch: Royal Canadian Air Force
- Service years: 1941 – 1945
- Rank: Flight lieutenant
- Nickname: "Dick"
- Service number: J/20136
- Conflicts: World War II Air campaigns: European air campaign; Ground campaigns: Western Front; Western Allied invasion of Germany †
- Awards: Distinguished Flying Cross & Bar

Richard Joseph "Dick" Audet DFC* (13 March 1922 – 3 March 1945) was a Canadian fighter pilot ace during World War II. In his first contact with enemy aircraft on 29 December 1944 he destroyed five planes. By the end of January 1945 he had claimed a further five victories and shared a sixth. He was killed in action on 3 March 1945 near Coesfeld, Germany.

== Childhood ==
Audet was born on 13 March 1922 in Lethbridge, Alberta, the youngest and sixth child of Paul and Edewisca Audet who were both born in Quebec. He grew up on the family ranch, in the Milk River valley, about two miles east of "Writing-on-Stone Provincial Park". With the exception of one year at Milk River Valley School he received all of his education to grade twelve in Coutts, Alberta. He was an outstanding athlete and loved all sports including hockey, basketball, and baseball. He was offered a position in Lethbridge to instruct and coach these sports, but he made up his mind to become a pilot. Too young to enlist, he attended business college in Lethbridge in 1940–41, then worked as a stenographer and bookkeeper at the air force base at High River.

== War service ==
Audet enlisted for service in the Royal Canadian Air Force (RCAF) on 7 August 1941 and received his pilot's wings in October 1942. He was then posted to the UK where he received five months of advanced operational training followed by non-fighter operations. During this time he met and married Iris Gibbins from Northampton.

On 20 September 1944, he was transferred to a RCAF Spitfire unit, 411 Squadron. Later that year on 29 December, piloting a Spitfire IXe he destroyed two Bf 109s and three Fw 190s in five to seven minutes over Osnabrück. This action earned him a promotion to flight lieutenant and he was awarded the Distinguished Flying Cross (DFC). The published citation for the DFC read:

This officer has proved himself to be a highly skilled and courageous fighter. In December, 1944, the squadron was involved in an engagement against 12 enemy fighters in the Rheine/Osnabruck area. In a most spirited action, Flying Officer Audet achieved outstanding success by destroying 5 enemy aircraft. This feat is a splendid tribute to his brilliant shooting, great gallantry and tenacity.

— London Gazette, No. 36942, 16 February 1945.

On 3 March 1945, Audet was strafing a German train west of Münster. The train returned fire and Audet's Spitfire crashed to the ground. There is some uncertainty as to whether he died in the crash or was captured, but his body was never recovered. An award of a bar was announced after his death. The published citation read:

This officer is an outstanding fighter. Since his first engagement, towards the end of December, 1944, he has completed numerous sorties during which he has destroyed a further 6 enemy aircraft, bring his total victories to 11; Flight Lieutenant Audet has also most effectively attacked numerous locomotives and mechanical vehicles. His skill and daring have won the greatest praise.

— London Gazette, No. 36975, 9 March 1945.

Audet had flown more than 50 combat sorties. In addition to his DFC and bar, he was awarded the 1939-45 Star, Air Crew Europe Star with Clasp, France and Germany Star, Defence Medal, War Medal 1939–1945 and Canadian Volunteer Service Medal with Clasp.

== Memorials ==
Flight Lieutenant Richard Joseph Audet has no known grave and his name is recorded on panel 278 of the Air Forces Memorial, or Runnymede Memorial, in England. and the Lethbridge cenotaph. His mother and wife both received a Memorial Cross in his honour.
