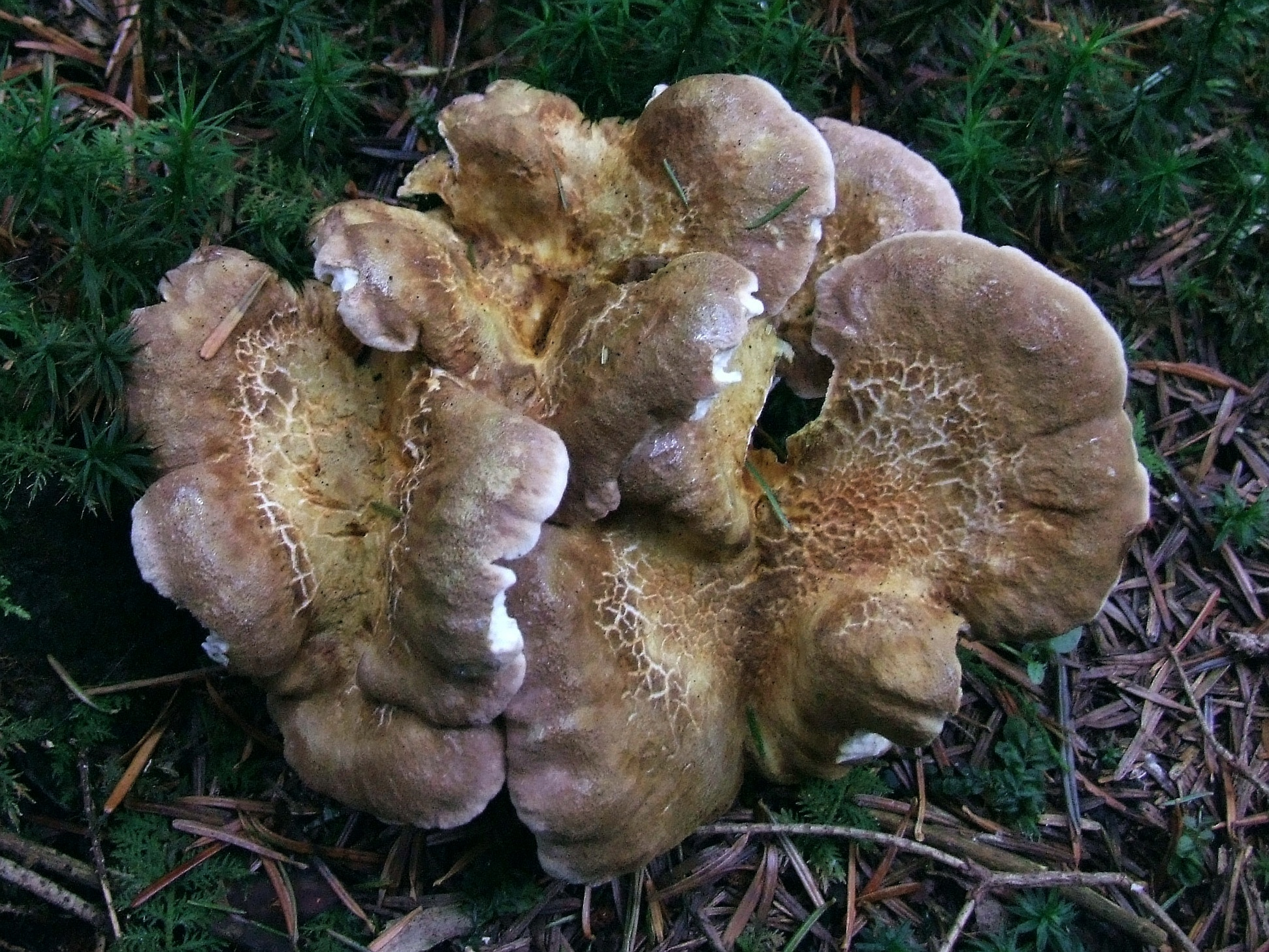

Scientific classification
- Domain: Eukaryota
- Kingdom: Fungi
- Division: Basidiomycota
- Class: Agaricomycetes
- Order: Russulales
- Family: Albatrellaceae
- Genus: Laeticutis
- Species: L. cristata

Binomial name
- Laeticutis cristata (Schaeff.) Audet (2010)

Synonyms
- List: Boletus cristatus Schaeff. (1774); Polyporus cristatus (Schaeff.) Fr. (1821); Grifola cristata (Schaeff.) Gray (1821); Merisma cristatus (Schaeff.) Gillet (1878); Polypilus cristatus (Schaeff.) P. Karst. (1882); Cladomeris cristata (Schaeff.) Quél. (1886); Caloporus cristatus (Schaeff.) Quél. (1888); Scutiger cristatus (Schaeff.) Bondartsev & Singer (1941); Albatrellus cristatus (Schaeff.) Kotl. & Pouzar (1957)

= Laeticutis cristata =

Species of fungus

Laeticutis cristata is a species of fungus in the family Albatrellaceae. It is found in Asia, Europe, and North America, where it grows singly or in fused clumps on the ground in deciduous and coniferous forests. Fruit bodies contain cristatic acid, a benzoic acid derivative that has cytotoxic activity and antibiotic activity against Bacillus species in laboratory tests. Another compound known only from the fungus, cristatomentin, is a green pigment with a meroterpene chemical structure.
