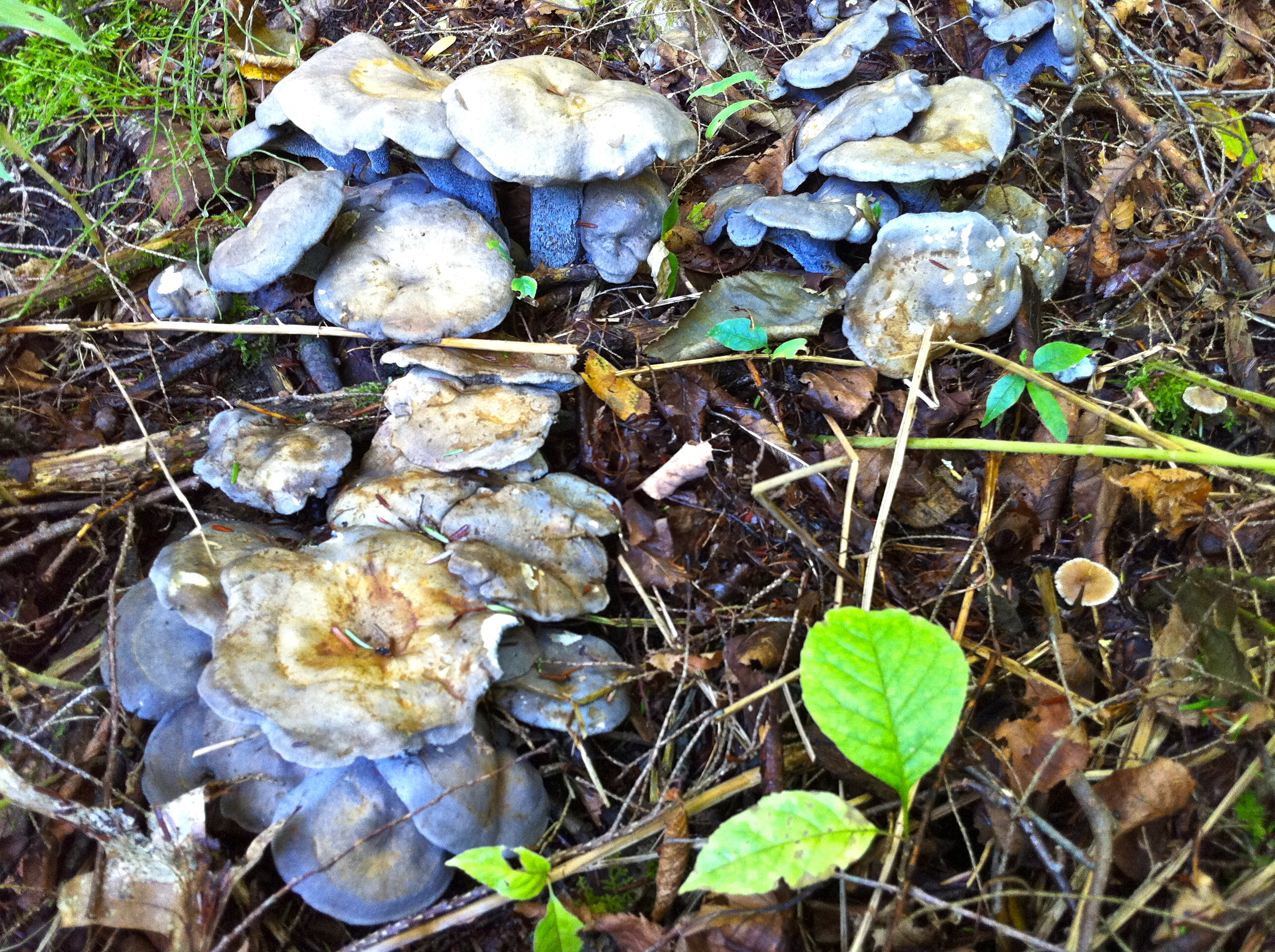

Conservation status
- Vulnerable (NatureServe)

Scientific classification
- Kingdom: Fungi
- Division: Basidiomycota
- Class: Agaricomycetes
- Order: Russulales
- Family: incertae sedis
- Genus: Neoalbatrellus
- Species: N. caeruleoporus

Binomial name
- Neoalbatrellus caeruleoporus (Peck) Audet, (2010)

= Neoalbatrellus caeruleoporus =

Species of fungus

Neoalbatrellus caeruleoporus is a species of endangered fungus in the family Albatrellaceae.
