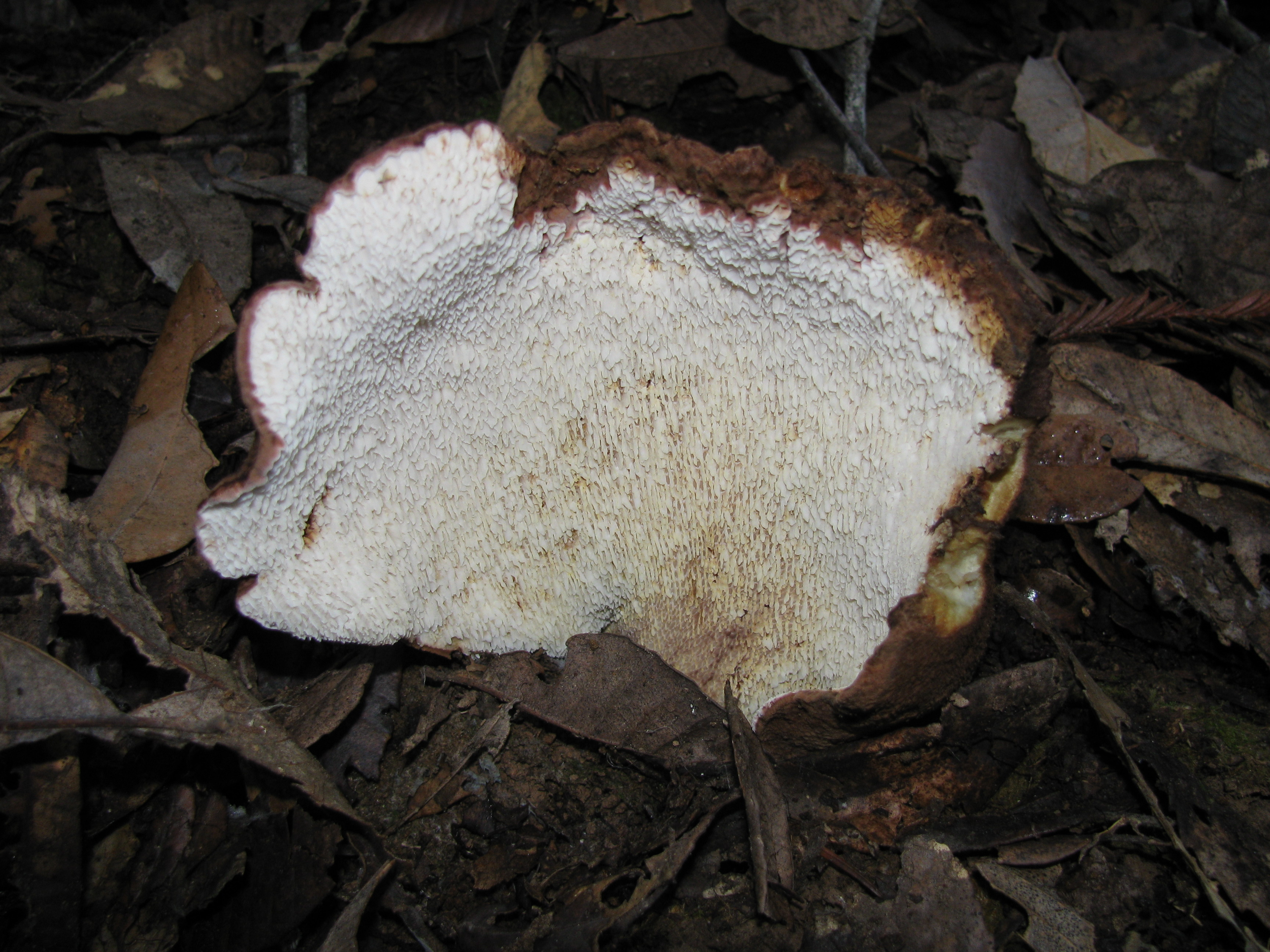

Scientific classification
- Kingdom: Fungi
- Division: Basidiomycota
- Class: Agaricomycetes
- Order: Russulales
- Family: Albatrellaceae
- Genus: Scutiger; Paulet (1808)

Species
- S. auriscalpium S. brasiliensis S. caeruleoporus S. cryptopus S. decurrens S. ellisii S. holocyaneus S. oregonensis S. subrubescens S. subsquamosus S. tuberosus

= Scutiger (fungus) =

Genus of fungi

Scutiger is a genus of fungi in the family Albatrellaceae, which includes S. oregonensis, the fungus tuber.

== General characteristics ==
Species in Scutiger are terrestrial, annual, and usually have simple, bright-colored, mesoporous hymenophores. The surface anoderm is variously decorated; the context is usually white, but rarely colored, and is fleshy to tough—rigid and fragile when dry. The hymenium is porous, can be white or colored, and has thin-walled tubes; The spores are smooth, or rarely echinulate and hyaline.

The surface of the pileus can be uneven, squamous, or rugose as in S. oregonensis or S. decurrens; or smooth and hispid-tomentose, as in S. hispidellus (synonymous with Jahnoporus hirtus, which was named for this quality.

== Species list ==
- S. auriscalpium
- S. brasiliensis
- S. caeruleoporus
- S. cryptopus
- S. decurrens
- S. ellisii (synonymous with Albatrellus ellisii or greening goat's foot)
- S. hispidellus (synonymous with Jahnoporus hirtus)
- S. holocyaneus
- S. oregonensis
- S. subrubescens
- S. subsquamosus
- S. tuberosus
