= Zdeněk Pouzar =

Czech mycologist (1932–2023)

Zdeněk Pouzar (13 April 1932 – 4 June 2023) was a Czech mycologist. Along with František Kotlaba, he published several works about the taxonomy of polypore, corticioid, and gilled fungi. Pouzar was a noted expert on stromatic pyrenomycetes. Until 2012, he was the editor-in-chief of the scientific journal Czech Mycology.

Pouzar died on 4 June 2023, at the age of 91.

The standard author abbreviation Pouzar is used to indicate this person as the author when citing a botanical name.
