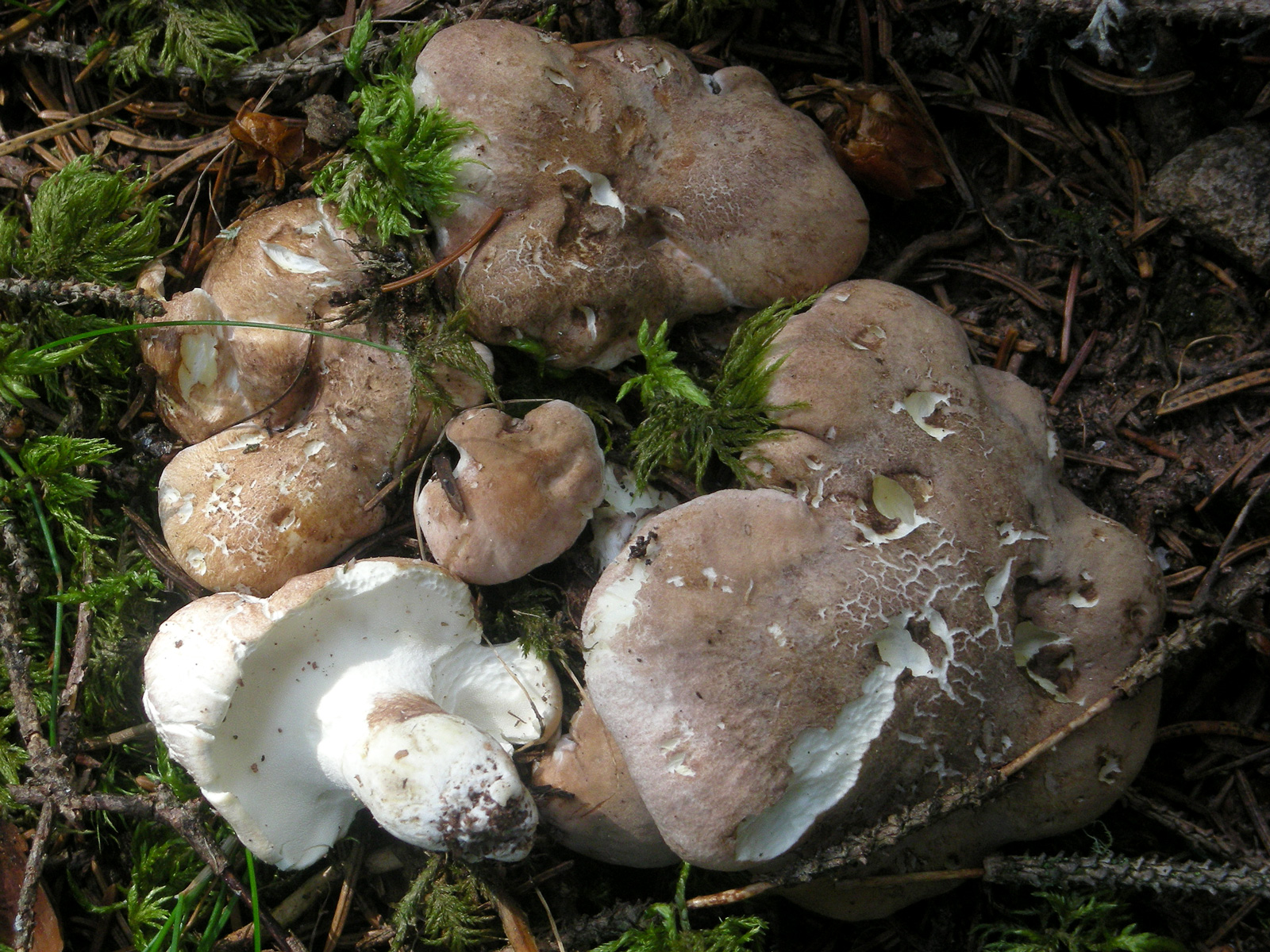
- Albatrellus ovinus

Scientific classification
- Kingdom: Fungi
- Division: Basidiomycota
- Class: Agaricomycetes
- Order: Russulales
- Family: Albatrellaceae; Pouzar (1966)

Type genus
- Albatrellus Gray (1821)

Genera
- Albatrellus; Byssoporia; Fevansia; Jahnoporus; Leucogaster; Leucophleps; Mycolevis; Polyporoletus; Scutiger

Synonyms
- Leucogastraceae Moreau ex Fogel (1979)

= Albatrellaceae =

Family of fungi

The Albatrellaceae are a family of fungi in the order Russulales. The family contains 9 genera and more than 45 species.

== Description ==
Most genera in the family produce fruit bodies which have typical mushroom morphology, with caps and stems. Others form false truffles. It also includes a single corticioid genus; Byssoporia.

== See also ==
- List of Basidiomycota families
