= Remutaka Forest Park =

Protected area near Wellington

- IUCN category V (protected landscape/seascape)
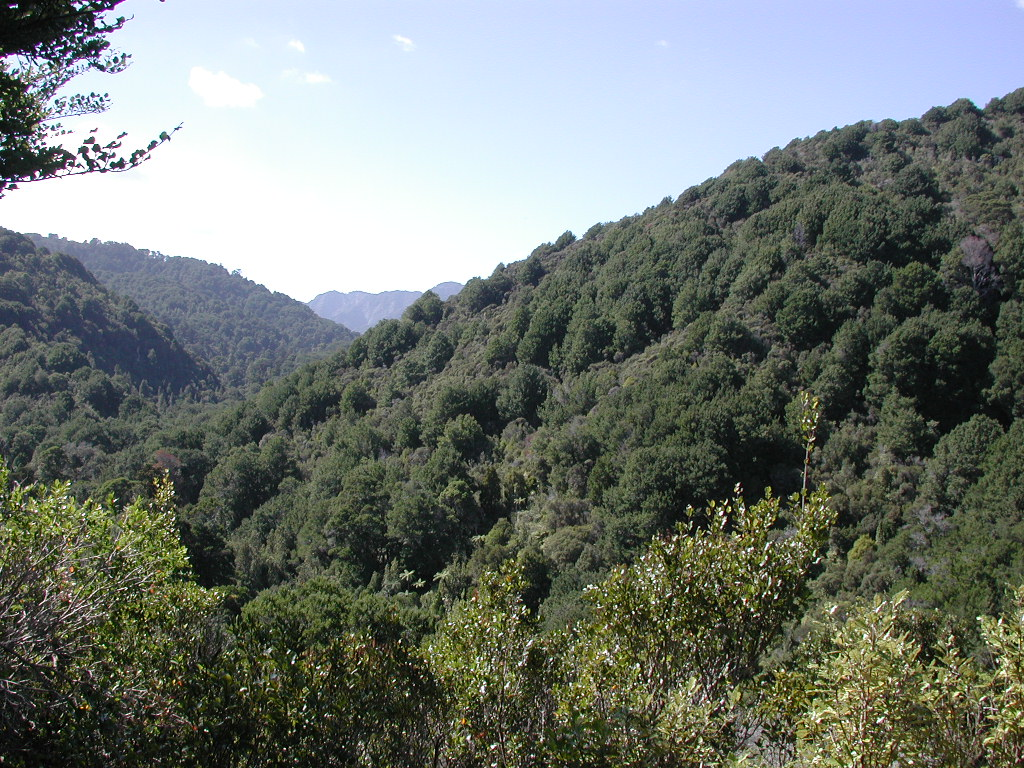
- Catchpool Valley

- Location within New Zealand
- Location: North Island, New Zealand
- Nearest city: Lower Hutt
- Coordinates: 41.36°S 175°E
- Area: 22,000 hectares (54,000 acres)
- Established: 1972
- Governing body: Department of Conservation
- Website: doc.govt.nz

Remutaka Forest Park (spelled Rimutaka Forest Park prior to 2017) is a protected area near Wellington, New Zealand. Popular access points are south of Wainuiomata and in the upper Hutt Valley. The park covers 220 square kilometres (85 sq mi), encompassing the Catchpool Valley and the Ōrongorongo Valley at the southern end of the Remutaka Range. Established in 1972, the park contains several short walks and six huts that can be booked and accessed by longer bush tramps. The park is one part of several local conservation areas, as it borders the Pakuratahi Forest and the Tararua Range.

The park includes the Remutaka Rail Trail, a dis-established rail line that operated from 1878 to 1955 that is now used for mountain biking and walking.

In 2017, the name of the park (and range) was changed from "Rimutaka" to "Remutaka" following a treaty settlement with Rangitāne o Wairarapa and Rangitāne o Tamaki nui-ā-Rua. (The former name continues to be used in some online documents.)

== Rare and protected species ==
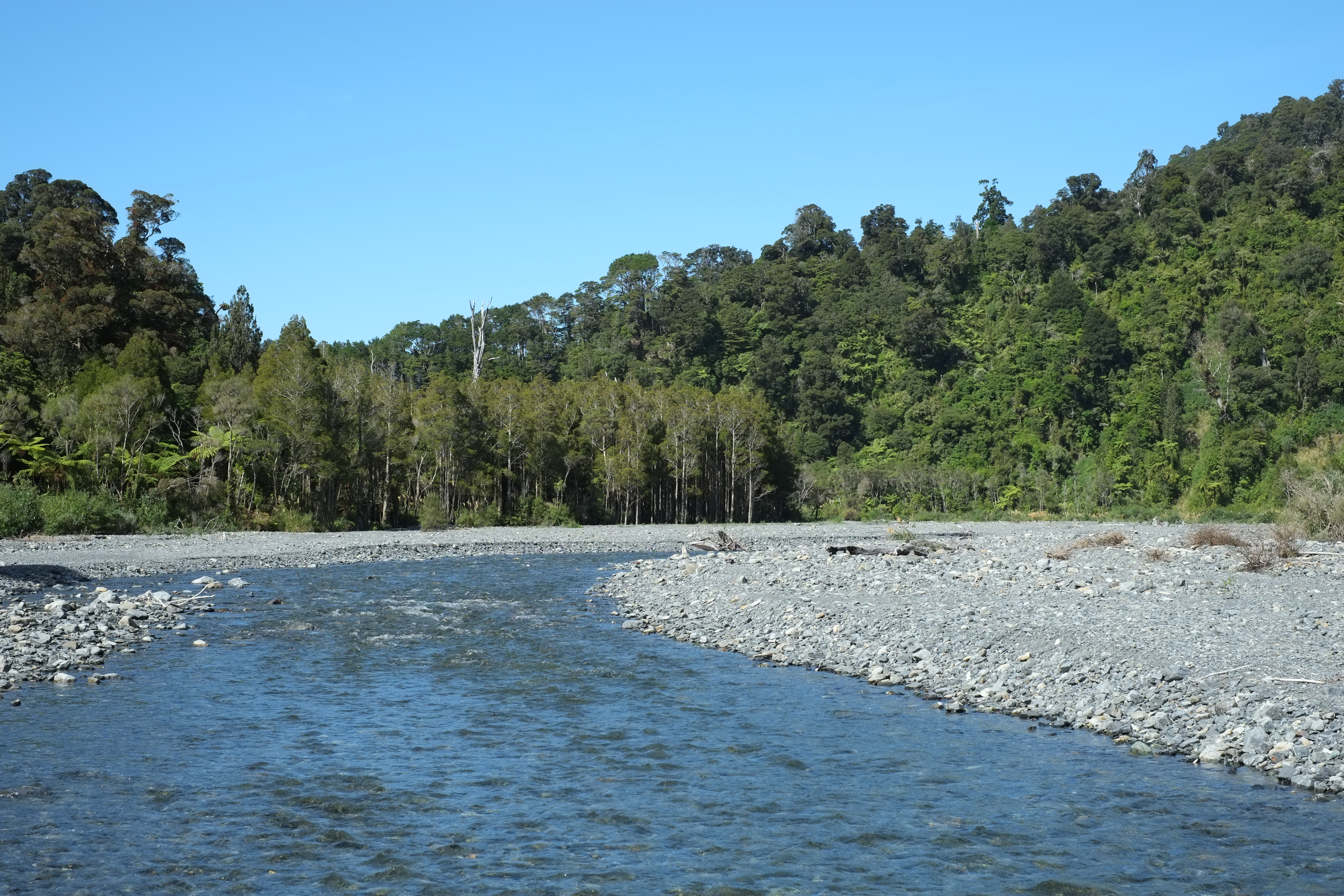
Ōrongorongo River within the Ōrongorongo valley

The Ōrongorongo Valley is one of two known areas that host the endangered fungus Boletopsis nothofagi.

A population of North Island brown kiwi has been established in the northern part of the Remutaka Forest Park, called the Turere catchment kiwi zone. To support the population's growth, kiwi eggs are transferred by volunteers to the Pukaha / Mount Bruce National Wildlife Centre and other protected areas such as the Wairakei Sanctuary for incubation and early growth. The programme is working. In 2014, an analysis of acoustic recordings indicated that more than 100 birds were living in the park. This is a 10-fold increase from the 10 kiwi that were originally released.

The kiwi zone is protected by a dog exclusion area. Dogs may run off lead within a defined exercise area in Catchpool Valley, but restrictions apply in the rest of the park.

== Recreation ==
The park is a popular recreation area for the surrounding Wellington and Wairarapa regions. In the north, the Remutaka Rail Trail is used extensively by walkers and mountain bikers. The rail trail is generally accessed by road north of Upper Hutt, as the gradient to the summit is gentler on that side. The Rimutaka Incline is on the eastern side of the summit and can also be accessed by road, south of Featherston at Cross Creek.

The back country hills attract hunting and multi-day hiking expeditions. The Ōrongorongo Valley is home to a number of private huts.

At the Catchpool entrance, south of Lower Hutt, there are two camping areas as well as outdoor BBQs and flushing toilets.

== Climate ==
Climate data for Rimutaka Forest (1981–2010)
Month	Jan	Feb	Mar	Apr	May	Jun	Jul	Aug	Sep	Oct	Nov	Dec	Year
Mean daily maximum °C (°F)	21.6 (70.9)	21.5 (70.7)	20.1 (68.2)	17.5 (63.5)	15.2 (59.4)	13.0 (55.4)	12.0 (53.6)	12.9 (55.2)	14.6 (58.3)	15.9 (60.6)	17.5 (63.5)	19.7 (67.5)	16.8 (62.2)
Daily mean °C (°F)	17.0 (62.6)	16.9 (62.4)	15.6 (60.1)	12.9 (55.2)	11.3 (52.3)	9.3 (48.7)	8.2 (46.8)	8.9 (48.0)	10.5 (50.9)	12.0 (53.6)	13.3 (55.9)	15.4 (59.7)	12.6 (54.7)
Mean daily minimum °C (°F)	12.5 (54.5)	12.2 (54.0)	11.1 (52.0)	8.4 (47.1)	7.3 (45.1)	5.7 (42.3)	4.4 (39.9)	5.0 (41.0)	6.5 (43.7)	8.1 (46.6)	9.2 (48.6)	11.2 (52.2)	8.5 (47.3)
Average rainfall mm (inches)	49.8 (1.96)	69.2 (2.72)	121.1 (4.77)	70.3 (2.77)	139.3 (5.48)	167.8 (6.61)	198.1 (7.80)	113.3 (4.46)	101.6 (4.00)	117.0 (4.61)	98.4 (3.87)	92.0 (3.62)	1,337.9 (52.67)
Source: NIWA

== Proposed de-extinction of moa ==
The park was the subject of a minor political argument surrounding a proposal to revive the extinct moa. Local politician Trevor Mallard, called for support for a de-extinction attempt "50-100 years out".

== See also ==
- Forest Parks of New Zealand
- Protected areas of New Zealand
