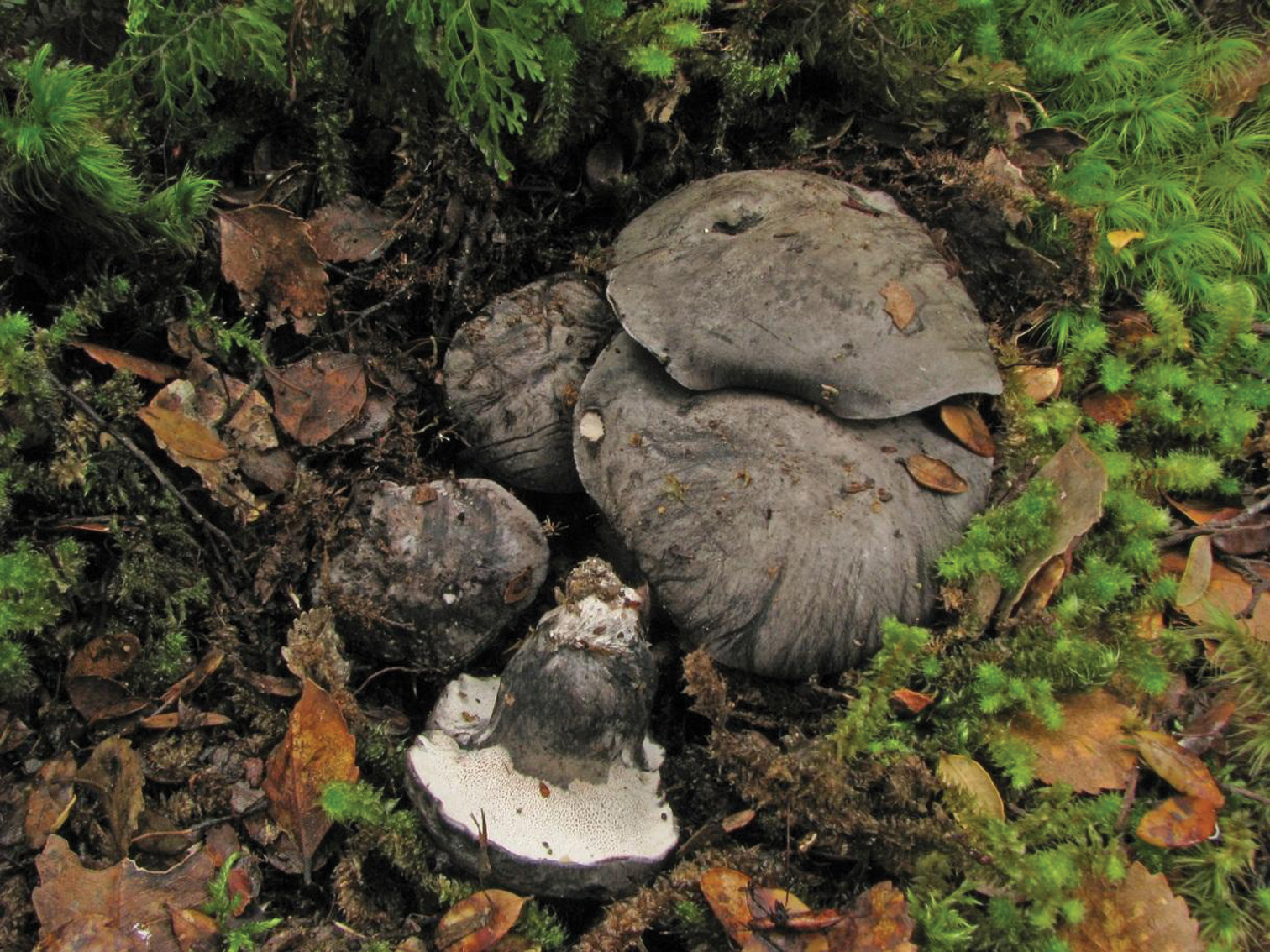

Conservation status
- Endangered (IUCN 3.1)

Scientific classification
- Kingdom: Fungi
- Division: Basidiomycota
- Class: Agaricomycetes
- Order: Thelephorales
- Family: Bankeraceae
- Genus: Boletopsis
- Species: B. nothofagi

Binomial name
- Boletopsis nothofagi J.A.Cooper & P.Leonard (2012)

= Boletopsis nothofagi =

Species of fungus

Boletopsis nothofagi is a fungus in the family Bankeraceae. The fungus forms grey fruit bodies that grow in clusters. Like all species of Boletopsis, it has a porous spore-bearing surface on the underside of the cap, but differs from other species of Boletopsis by having characteristics such as elongated spores and a green discoloration when stained with potassium hydroxide. Boletopsis nothofagi is endemic to New Zealand and has a mycorrhizal association with red beech (Nothofagus fusca). It is unknown when exactly the fungus forms its fruit body, but it has so far been found solely in May, during autumn in the Southern Hemisphere.

The first description of B. nothofagi was published in 2012 by Jerry A. Cooper and Patrick Leonard. DNA studies of the fungus suggest that it is a somewhat basal member of the genus Boletopsis. The fungus is most likely a native species of New Zealand and was present there before the arrival of Europeans. As it is very rare and possibly threatened, B. nothofagi is listed in the Red List of Threatened Species as an endangered species.

== Taxonomy ==
- - B. leucomelaena (USA)
  - - B. nothofagi
    - - B. leucomelaena (Finland)
      - - B. perplexa
        - B. subsquamosa
    - - Boletopsis sp. (Unknown origin)
      - - B. grisea
        - B. leucomelaena (Korea)

In 2009, an unknown species of Boletopsis was discovered in the Ōrongorongo valley near Wellington, New Zealand. In 2010, the fungus was found again in the same place and also discovered on the South Island. Morphological comparisons and molecular analysis of other species of the genus suggested that the fungus could not be attributed to any known representative of the genus, and so it was described by mycologists Jerry A. Cooper and Patrick Leonard as a new species. The species description of Boletopsis nothofagi appeared in the journal MycoKeys in 2012. The two authors chose the epithet nothofagi based on the characteristic of the fungus as mycorrhizal symbiont of Nothofagus fusca. Swollen hyphae and smooth spores show that B. nothofagi is a member of the subgenus Boletopsis in the genus Boletopsis.

Boletopsis nothofagi is a genetically clearly differentiated representative of the genus Boletopsis, which according to the investigations of Cooper and Leonard separated relatively early from the precursor of most other known species. Only a North American species, B. leucomelaena, branches off from their phylogenetic tree even earlier. However, the relationships between many of the species were not fully resolved in the study, so in the future, new species may be described.

== Description ==
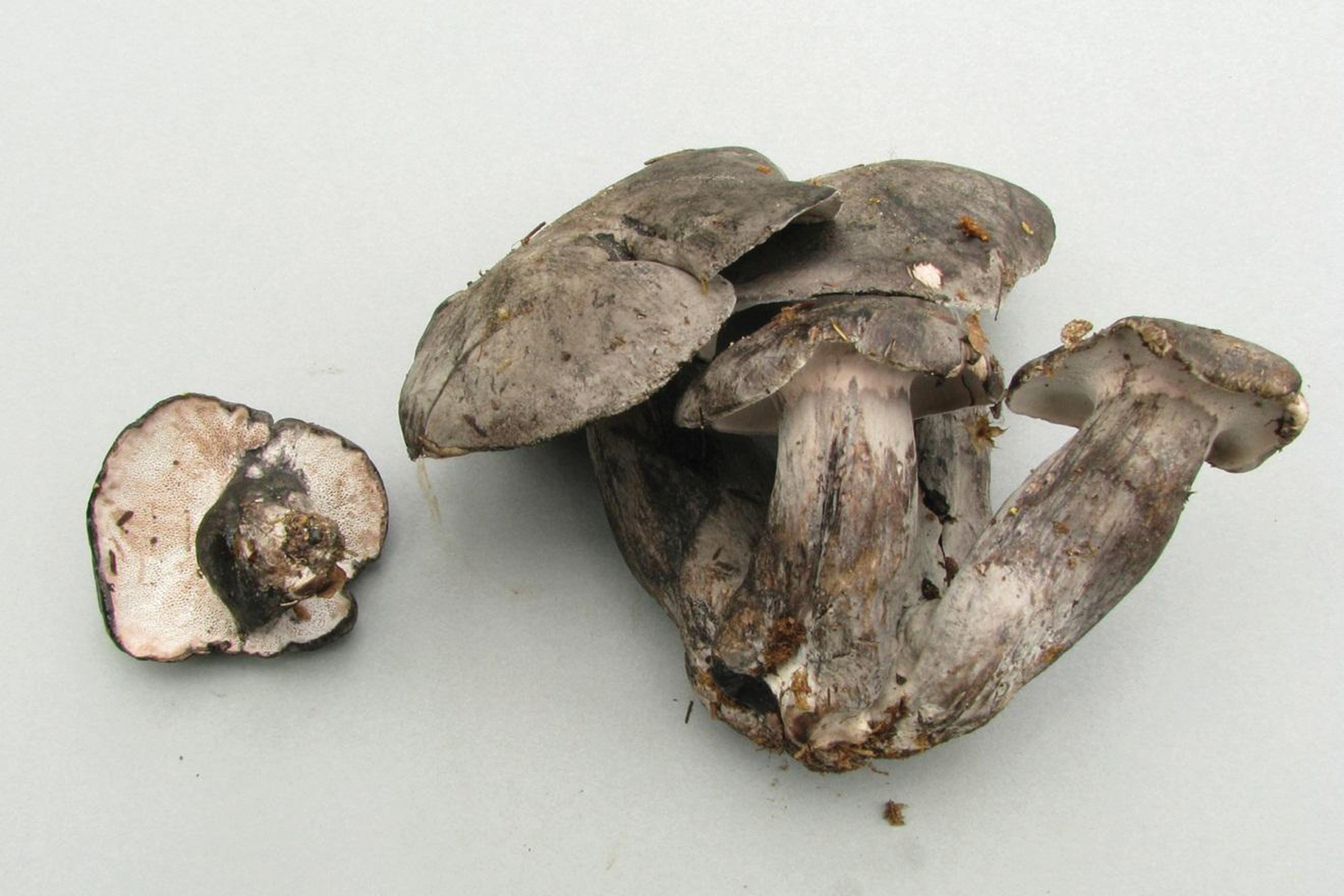
The fruit bodies of Boletopsis nothofagi usually grow in tufts.

The fruit bodies of Boletopsis nothofagi usually grow in tufts and only rarely individually. They have a centrally stalked cap. The cap is convex, measuring 10–80 mm (0.4–3.1 in) wide and 5–22 mm (0.2–0.9 in) high. In young specimens, the cap's edge is slightly bent, whereas the cap of older fruit bodies often curl. The cap cuticle is gray in color, and its texture ranges from smooth to slightly fibrous. Pressure- or scrape-spots are stained darker and eventually blacken.

The stipes are club-shaped to cylindrical, slightly tapering towards both base and cap, with a height of about 20–60 mm (0.8–2.4 in) and a thickness of 10–25 mm (0.4–1.0 in). The stipe is smooth and dry on the surface and has a firm texture on the inside. The stipes have a similar color as the cap and shows the same responses to damage.

The white, porous hymenium has a thickness of 1–2 mm and turns brown when bruised. Per millimeter, there are two to three square pores. When dried, the hymenium's color becomes pinkish-brown. The hymenium extends slightly down the stipe, and is sharply defined. Dried tissue smells similar to fenugreek. The morphology of the mycorrhiza has not yet been described; however, as with all other types of Boletopsis it is likely to be ectomycorrhizal.

=== Microscopic characteristics ===
Boletopsis nothofagi has a monomitic hyphal structure, whereby all hyphae are generative hyphae, which serve the growth of the fungus. The cap, when viewed under a microscope, is clearly differentiated and consists of a cutis, a layer of oriented hyphae lying radially. They are up to 2 μm thick, pigmented brown and covered with small, irregularly shaped granules. They become green when stained with potassium hydroxide (KOH), a diagnostic characteristic of the genus. The subcutis consists of swollen hyphae up to 6 μm thick. These are thin-walled, filled with oil droplets and have clamp connections in the septa. The hymenial layer has porous cystidium structures measuring 4 by 80 μm. The basidia of B. nothofagi are pleurobasidia arising on the sides of the hyphae. They are cylindrical to club shaped, 5–10 by 20–30 μm in size, and clamped at the base. The basidia always have four sterigmata, on which light brown, thin spores are situated. The spores are uneven, with flattened ends and elongated in shape. On average, they measure 5.3 by 4.1 μm.

Microscopic structures

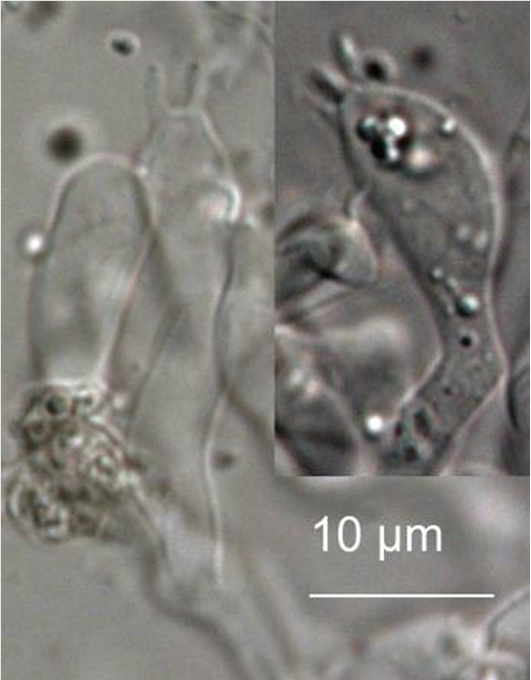
Basidium

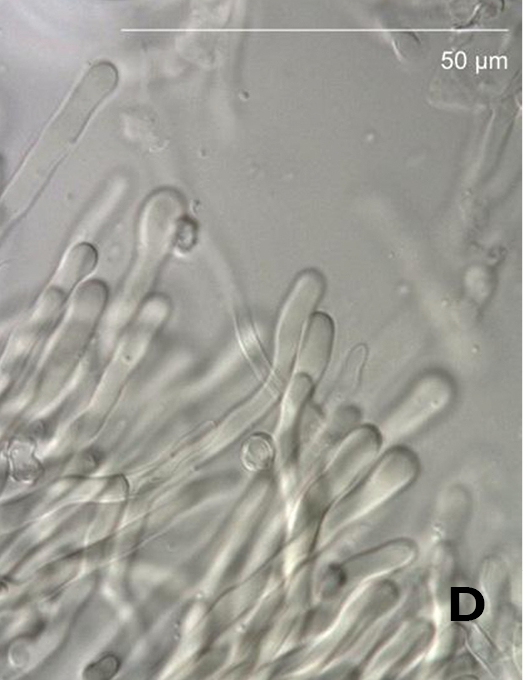
Cystidia-like structures

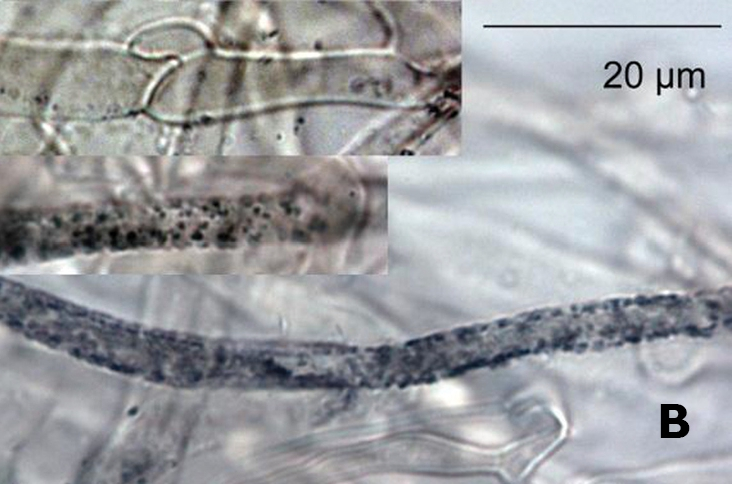
Hyphae with clamp connections

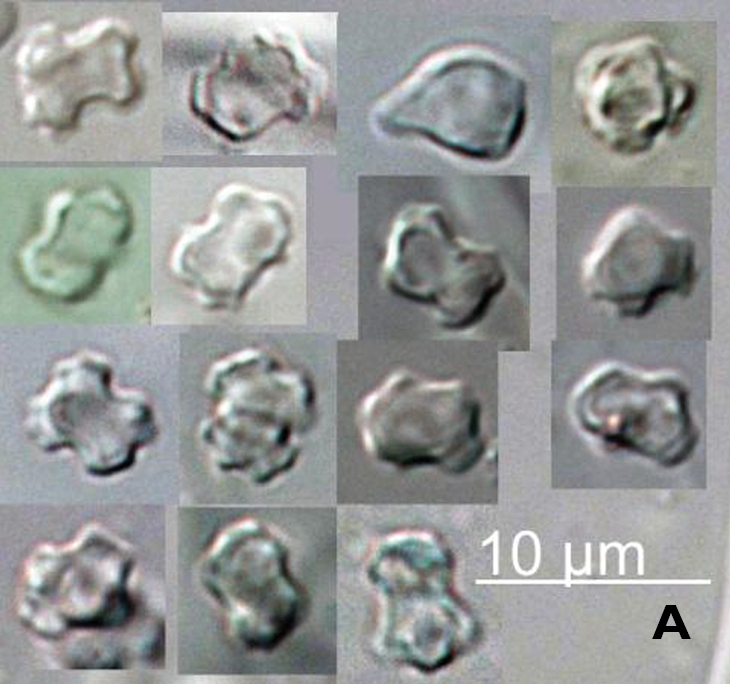
Spores

== Distribution ==
Distribution of B. nothofagi in New Zealand

The known range of Boletopsis nothofagi is limited to two narrowly defined areas of New Zealand, one on the North Island and the other on the South Island. These areas are in Rimutaka Forest Park near Wellington, and Saint Arnaud in the northern part of the South Island. These locations are relatively far away from each other and isolated, which, together with its absence in the rest of New Zealand, makes it unlikely that the species is a recent import. It is more likely that the species is native to New Zealand and has been overlooked in earlier surveys due to its rarity.

Boletopsis nothofagi is the most southern member of the genus Boletopsis, and as of 2013 the sole known member of the genus in the Southern Hemisphere; its closest relatives are found in Asia and Costa Rica.

== Ecology ==
The occurrence of Boletopsis nothofagi seems to be strongly connected to the occurrence of the southern beech Nothofagus fusca, a species of Fagales that is endemic to New Zealand. B. nothofagi has been found exclusively in N. fusca forests spread through New Zealand below 37° S. The fungus forms a mycorrhizal association with the trees of N. fusca, in which the hyphae of the fungal mycelium wrap around the roots of the tree and penetrate the cortex, but not its cells. Subsequently, B. nothofagi takes over the function of the root hair and directs water and soil nutrients to the tree. In return, the fungus can, through contact with the root tissue, access the products of the tree's photosynthesis. The fruit bodies of the species have so far always been found in May, the end of autumn in the Southern Hemisphere.

Little is known about the habitat requirements – such as humidity, temperature, soil composition and water content – of B. nothofagi. However, as the species seems to only occur together with N. fusca, it should largely conform to their demands. The tree species prefers lowlands and hills along river valleys and usually grows on nutrient-rich, well-drained soil. The species is more likely to be found inland than in the coastal regions.

== Status ==
According to Cooper and Leonard, the fact that Boletopsis nothofagi was only found 200 years after the European settlement of New Zealand illustrates the rarity of this species, although it is also possible that the late discovery was caused by rare or infrequent fructification. The authors assume that the species occurs very sparsely and that this cannot be attributed to human activity. Although no data on population trends or historical distribution of the fungus exists, Cooper and Leonard consider the species in accordance to the New Zealand Threat Classification System as "naturally uncommon".
