= Pākuratahi Forest =

Regional park in New Zealand

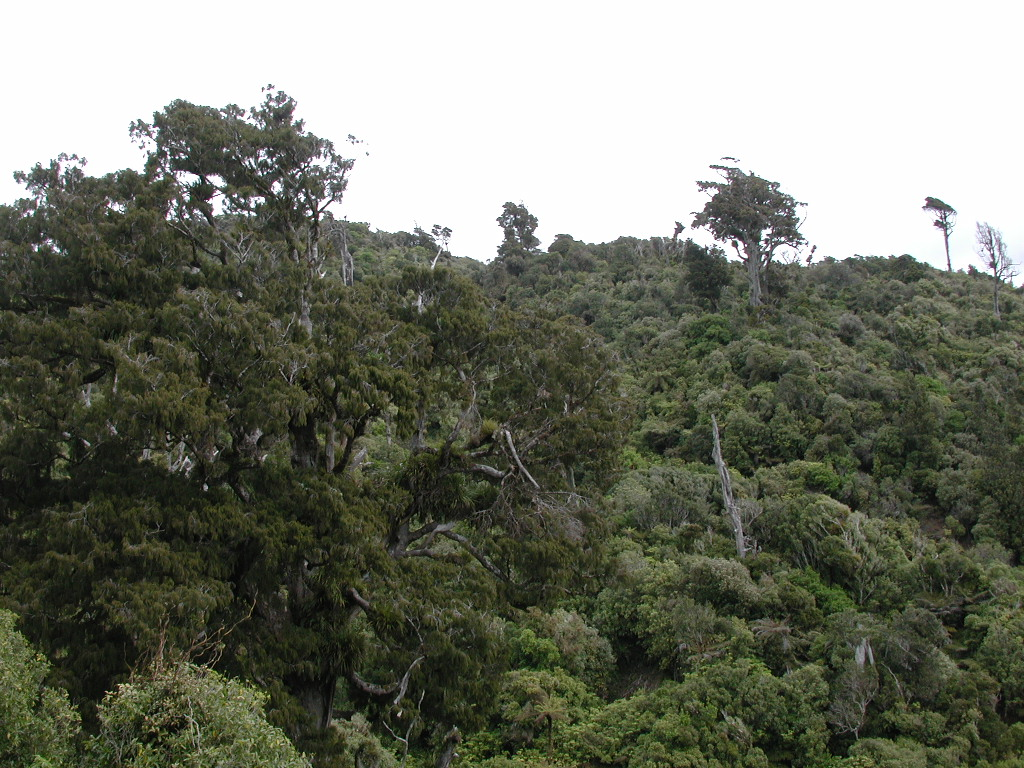
- Native bush on Mount Climie
- Interactive map of Pākuratahi Forest
- Type: Regional park
- Location: Upper Hutt, Wellington Region, New Zealand
- Coordinates: 41.14092°S 175.16052°E
- Area: 8,000 hectares (20,000 acres)
- Operator: Wellington Regional Council
- Open: 8am-dusk
- Status: Open

Pākuratahi Forest is a regional park located in Upper Hutt in the Wellington Region at the southern end of New Zealand's North Island. It is administered by Wellington Regional Council.

== Geography ==
The Pakuratahi Forest is located across 8,000 hectares (20,000 acres), on the western side of the Remutaka Ranges north of Upper Hutt. It includes the Kaitoke basin and the main Pakuratahi catchment, set aside for future water collection.

The forest is part of the ecological corridor connecting the Akatarawa, Tararua, Remutaka and Ōrongorongo ranges. Most of it contains native bush.

About 775 hectares (1,920 acres) in the northern part of the park is planted with exotic trees, and there is some logging.

== Recreation ==
The forest is used for walking, swimming and mountain biking.

The Remutaka Rail Trail follows the old railway through the area.

Te Ara Tirohanga, formerly the Remutaka Trig Track, tracks through the remnants of forest burned for the building of the Remutaka Hill Road in the 1870s. It starts at the road and zig-zags its way up the exposed slope, through returning native bush and shrub.

The Tunnel Gully Recreation Area is used for picnics, mountain biking and walking, through remaining native bush.

From the recreation area, the Mt Climie track leads to the summit of Mt Climie, which is the southern and eastern backdrop and windbreak to Upper Hutt.

The park is open from 8am to dusk each day. Dogs are permitted, but must be on leash in tunnels. Fireworks are banned at all times.
