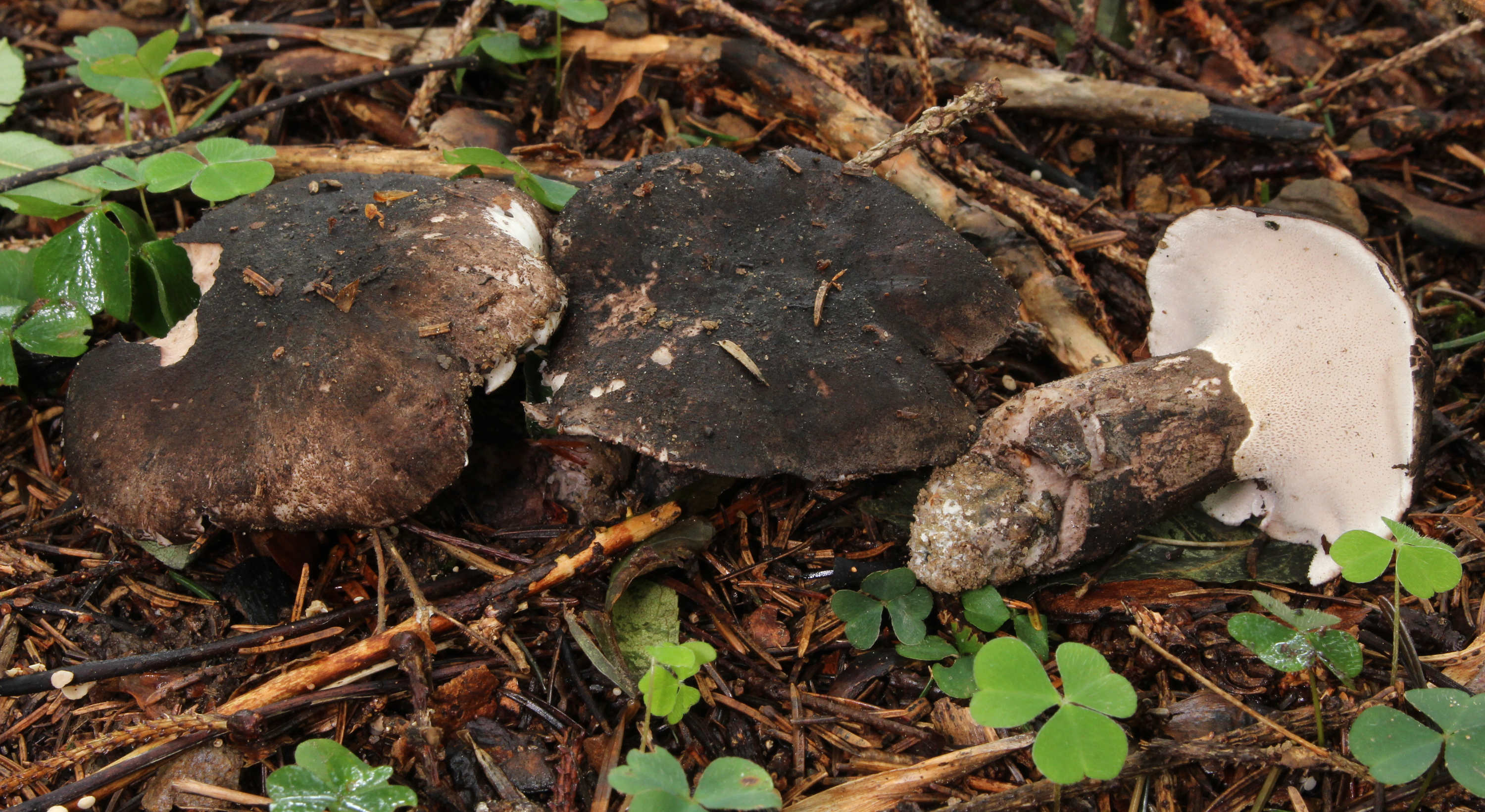
- Boletopsis leucomelaena

Scientific classification
- Kingdom: Fungi
- Division: Basidiomycota
- Class: Agaricomycetes
- Order: Thelephorales
- Family: Bankeraceae
- Genus: Boletopsis; Fayod (1889)

Type species
- Boletopsis leucomelaena (Pers.) Fayod (1889)

= Boletopsis =

Genus of fungi

Boletopsis is a genus of mycorrhizal fungi in the family Bankeraceae. The genus was circumscribed by Swiss mycologist Victor Fayod in 1889, with Boletopsis leucomelaena as the type species.

== Species ==
- Boletopsis atrata Ryvarden 1982 – Thailand
- Boletopsis grisea (Peck) Bondartsev & Singer 1941
- Boletopsis leucomelaena (Pers.) Fayod 1889 – Europe
- Boletopsis nothofagi J.A.Cooper & P.Leonard 2012 – New Zealand
- Boletopsis perplexa Watling & J.Milne 2006 – Scotland
- Boletopsis singaporensis Pat. & C.F.Baker 1918 – Singapore
- Boletopsis smithii K.A.Harrison 1975 – United States
- Boletopsis staudtii Henn. 1898
- Boletopsis subsquamosa (L.) Kotl. & Pouzar 1957 (edible)
