= Boletopsis smithii =

Scientific classification
- Domain: Eukaryota
- Kingdom: Fungi
- Division: Basidiomycota
- Class: Agaricomycetes
- Order: Thelephorales
- Family: Bankeraceae
- Genus: Boletopsis
- Species: B. smithii

Binomial name
- Boletopsis smithii K.A.Harrison (1975)

Species of fungus

Boletopsis smithii is a species of hydnoid fungus in the family Bankeraceae. It was described as new to science in 1975 by mycologist Keith A. Harrison, from collections made in Washington.
