= Boletopsis atrata =

Scientific classification
- Domain: Eukaryota
- Kingdom: Fungi
- Division: Basidiomycota
- Class: Agaricomycetes
- Order: Thelephorales
- Family: Bankeraceae
- Genus: Boletopsis
- Species: B. atrata

Binomial name
- Boletopsis atrata Ryvarden (1982)

Species of fungus

Boletopsis atrata is a species of hydnoid fungus in the family Bankeraceae. It was described as new to science in 1982 by Norwegian mycologist Leif Ryvarden. It has a disjunct distribution, found in temperate forests of East Asia and Eastern North America, where it fruits at the base of hardwood trees and stumps, especially oak (Quercus) and chestnuts (Castanea).
