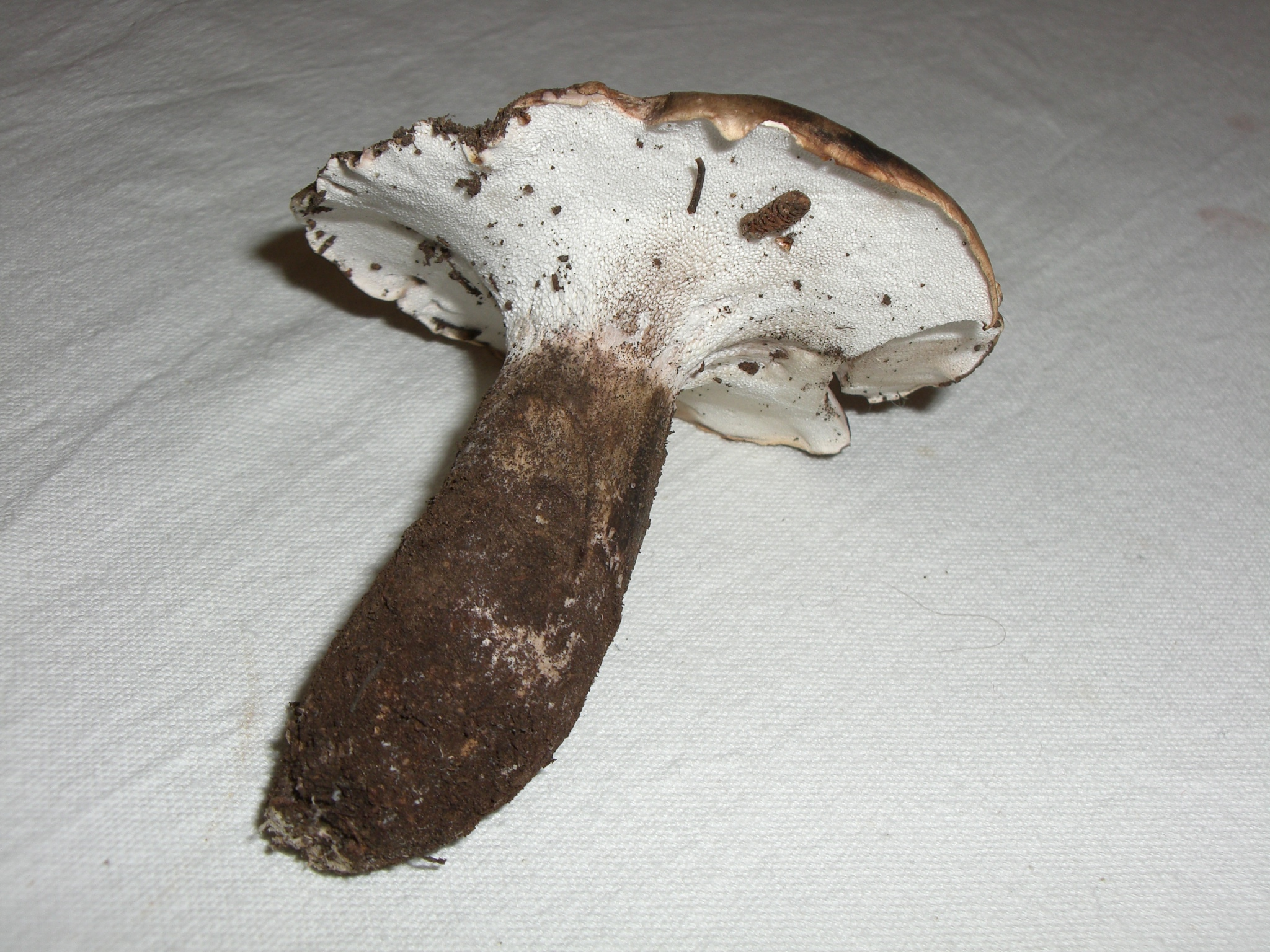

Scientific classification
- Domain: Eukaryota
- Kingdom: Fungi
- Division: Basidiomycota
- Class: Agaricomycetes
- Order: Thelephorales
- Family: Bankeraceae
- Genus: Boletopsis
- Species: B. leucomelaena

Binomial name
- Boletopsis leucomelaena (Pers.) Fayod (1889)

Synonyms
- Boletus leucomelas Pers. (1801); Polyporus subsquamosus var. leucomelas (Pers.) Fr. (1821); Polyporus leucomelas (Pers.) Pers. (1825); Caloporus leucomelas (Pers.) Quél. (1888); Polyporus ovinus subsp. leucomelas (Pers.) Bourdot & Galzin (1925)

= Boletopsis leucomelaena =

Species of tooth fungus

Boletopsis leucomelaena is a species of hydnoid fungus in the family Bankeraceae. The fungus is listed as a priority species in the United Kingdom Biodiversity Action Plan. B. leucomelaena is found in the Pacific Northwest region of North America, in Japan, and throughout Europe, although it is less common than the lookalike B. grisea.

== Taxonomy ==
The fungus was originally described in 1801 as Boletus leucomelas by Christian Hendrik Persoon in his work Synopsis Methodica Fungorum. The Swiss mycologist Victor Fayod transferred it to Boletopsis in 1889.

== Description ==
Boletopsis leucomelaena produces terrestrial fruit bodies that typically grow in dense clusters of three to ten. The cap is roundish, measuring 4–10 cm in diameter, with a flat-convex shape and a slightly raised centre. Both cap and stipe are fragile when fresh, easily cracking without fibrous orientation. The stipe is cylindrical or tapers toward the base, measuring 3–10 cm in length and 1–2.5 cm in diameter. The fungi dry rapidly, with all parts becoming soft and brittle. When potassium hydroxide (KOH) solution is applied, it creates a permanent sepia-black stain on all parts of the fungus.

The upper surface of the cap is smooth, matt, and water-absorbing, lacking zones and displaying a greyish sepia or black-brown colour, often with a tinge of magenta. Young fruit bodies are paler toward the margin, while older specimens develop a rougher surface, sometimes with minute scales at the centre. Areas damaged by snails display a distinctive pink-grey colouration. Upon drying, the cap becomes dark brownish grey to greenish black and wrinkled. The pore surface starts cream-coloured but develops a pale lilac-grey or smoky grey-brown tint, turning pinkish where bruised and grey-brown or olivaceous grey when dried.

When cut, the cap context (internal tissue) is homogeneous, soft and fleshy, measuring 1–2 cm thick at the stipe attachment. In young specimens, it is cream-coloured, changing to lilac-grey when cut, while mature fruit bodies show light grey tissue with a lilac tint. The tube layer is thin (1–2 mm) and smoke-coloured. The stipe context is solid when young (though older stipes may be hollowed by insect larvae), cream-coloured in young specimens and pale greyish-brown when mature. When properly dried, the context becomes soft and fragile, grey-brown with a green tint.

=== Similar species ===
Boletopsis leucomelaena can be distinguished from the similar species Boletopsis grisea by several characteristics. Where B. grisea has a silvery grey to dirty grey-brown cap, B. leucomelaena displays darker, blackish coloration. While B. grisea is fairly hard but can be torn in a radial direction when fresh, B. leucomelaena is more uniformly fragile. The fruit bodies of B. leucomelaena tend to grow upward and are approximately as tall as they are wide, whereas B. grisea produces more spreading fruit bodies that are typically wider than tall. These differences, along with their distinct habitat preferences—B. leucomelaena grows predominantly in rich spruce forests, while B. grisea is found almost exclusively in poor dry pine heath forests—help differentiate these two closely related species.

== Habitat, distribution, and ecology ==
Boletopsis leucomelaena favours relatively rich habitats, being found characteristically in spruce-dominated forests. In Finland, it occurs primarily in two forest types: spruce-dominated grass-herb forests (with intermixed birch, aspen, hazel and other deciduous trees and shrubs) and moist heath forests dominated by Norway spruce. The former habitat type features a ground layer with demanding grasses and herbs, with hygromorphic mosses that do not form a continuous mat, instead being interspersed with areas of decaying leaf litter and bare mull soil. The latter habitat contains more dwarf shrubs (especially bilberry), with a thicker moss layer. Both environments are shady with moist microclimates, and the lower vegetation under which the fruit bodies hide helps stabilise moisture even during dry periods. The species appears to tolerate soils on calcareous bedrock, though whether it is truly calciphilous is uncertain.

In Fennoscandia, B. leucomelaena is rare, with its distribution largely restricted to the hemiboreal zone and southern parts of the southern boreal zone. The species shows a distinctly southerly distribution pattern in Nordic countries, with northern occurrences typically limited to isolated patches in botanically rich limestone areas. These northern outliers display a special distributional pattern also observed in certain vascular plants, with a coherent southern distribution area supplemented by isolated occurrences in rich calcareous northern biotopes. Throughout Europe, the species is rare or very rare, occurring primarily in lowlands up to submontane mixed spruce and fir forests. Records exist from Switzerland, Italy, France, Germany, and Slovakia, with observations also reported from North America and Japan.

The fruiting period of B. leucomelaena in Nordic countries begins in late July, with most fruiting occurring from late August through October. According to limited observations, the species tends to appear fairly regularly in successive years at established sites. Due to its rarity and specific habitat requirements, B. leucomelaena faces threats from intensive forestry, suburban development, and other environmental pressures. The abundance of fruit bodies varies seasonally, dependent on favourable weather conditions during the growing period.
