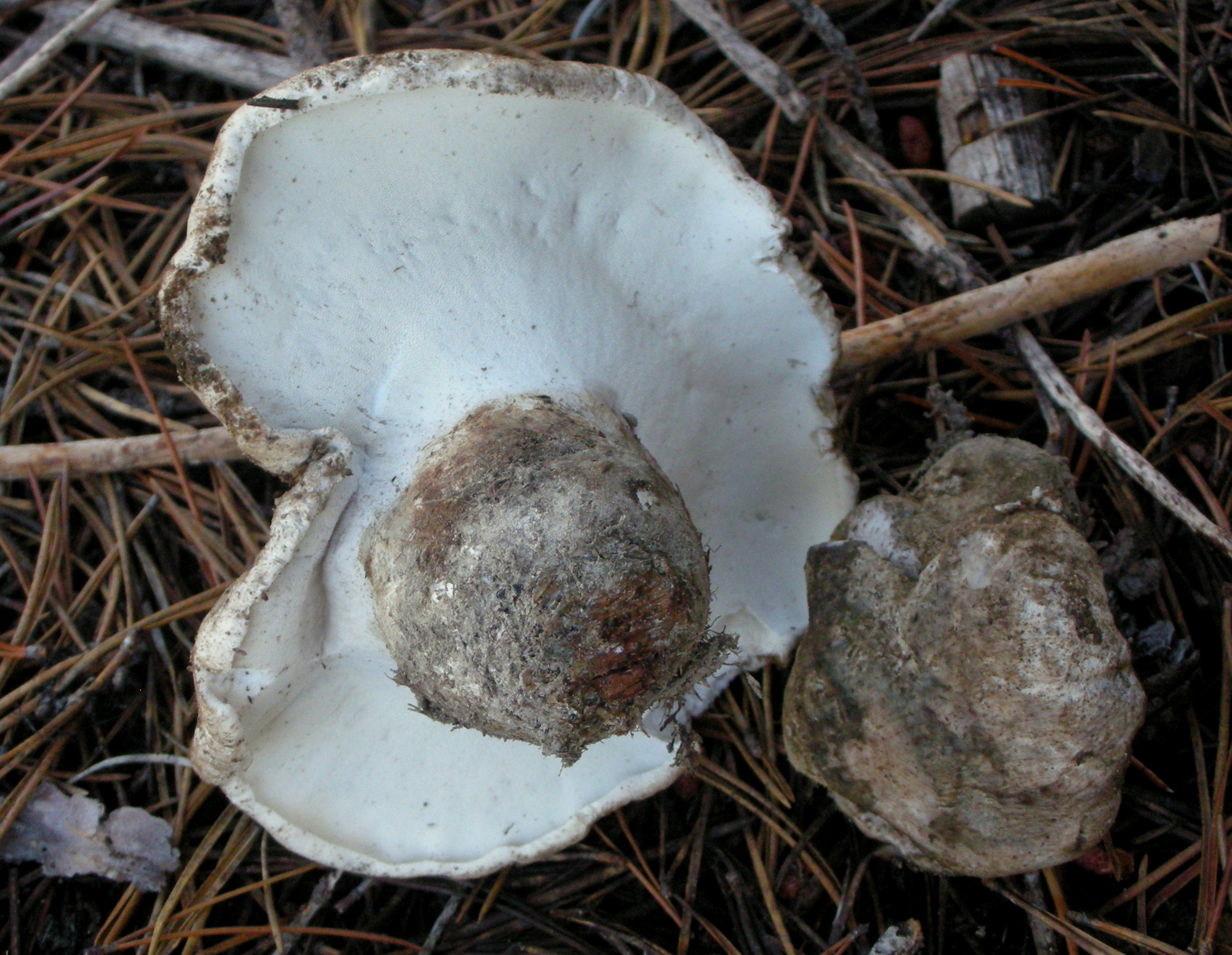

Scientific classification
- Domain: Eukaryota
- Kingdom: Fungi
- Division: Basidiomycota
- Class: Agaricomycetes
- Order: Thelephorales
- Family: Bankeraceae
- Genus: Boletopsis
- Species: B. grisea

Binomial name
- Boletopsis grisea (Peck) Bondartsev & Singer (1941)

Synonyms
- Polyporus griseus Peck (1874); Scutiger griseus (Peck) Murrill (1903); Polyporus involutus Britzelm. (1896); Polyporus earlei Underw. (1897); Polyporus maximovicii Velen. (1922)

= Boletopsis grisea =

Species of fungus

Boletopsis grisea is a species of fungus in the family Bankeraceae. The fruit bodies are gray, fleshy polypores that grow on the ground in a mycorrhizal association with Scots pine (Pinus sylvestris). It is found in Europe and North America.

== Taxonomy ==
The fungus was first described in 1874 as a species of Polyporus by American mycologist Charles Horton Peck in 1874, who made the type collection in Copake, New York. Appollinaris Semenovich Bondartsev and Rolf Singer transferred it to Boletopsis in 1941.

== Description ==
The fruit body is a fleshy polypore that grows from the ground. The gray cap is convex and irregular with a dry surface. The cap grows up to 15 centimetres (6 in) wide, the stem 3–10 cm (1 1/4–4 in). Underneath the cap are white pores. The stout stipe is the same colour as the cap.

The flesh is whitish, discoloring gray to greenish. The smell is fragrant. The spore print is tan.

=== Similar species ===
It may resemble B. leucomelaena as well as Albatrellus ovinus and its close relatives.

== Distribution and habitat ==
Boletopsis grisea is found in Europe, and in both Canada and the United States (August–October in the east and September–November in the west), growing on nutrient-poor acidic soils. It has a mycorrhizal association with Pinus sylvestris (Scots pine), as well as lichens and heath plants as understorey.

== Conservation ==
Boletopsis grisea is a threatened species in Europe, where it has been short-listed for inclusion in the Berne Convention on the Conservation of European Wildlife and Natural Habitats by the European Council for Conservation of Fungi. It has been recorded from 15 countries, and appears on five Regional Red Lists. Threats to the fungus include deforestation, air pollution, and the use of fertilizers and lime used to increase timber production.

== Research ==
Research has identified p-terphenyl compounds that impart a free radical scavenging activity in laboratory tests. Eight phenolic compounds have been isolated and identified from the fruit bodies, including three that inhibit the enzyme 5-lipoxidase.
