= Remutaka Rail Trail =

Track in New Zealand

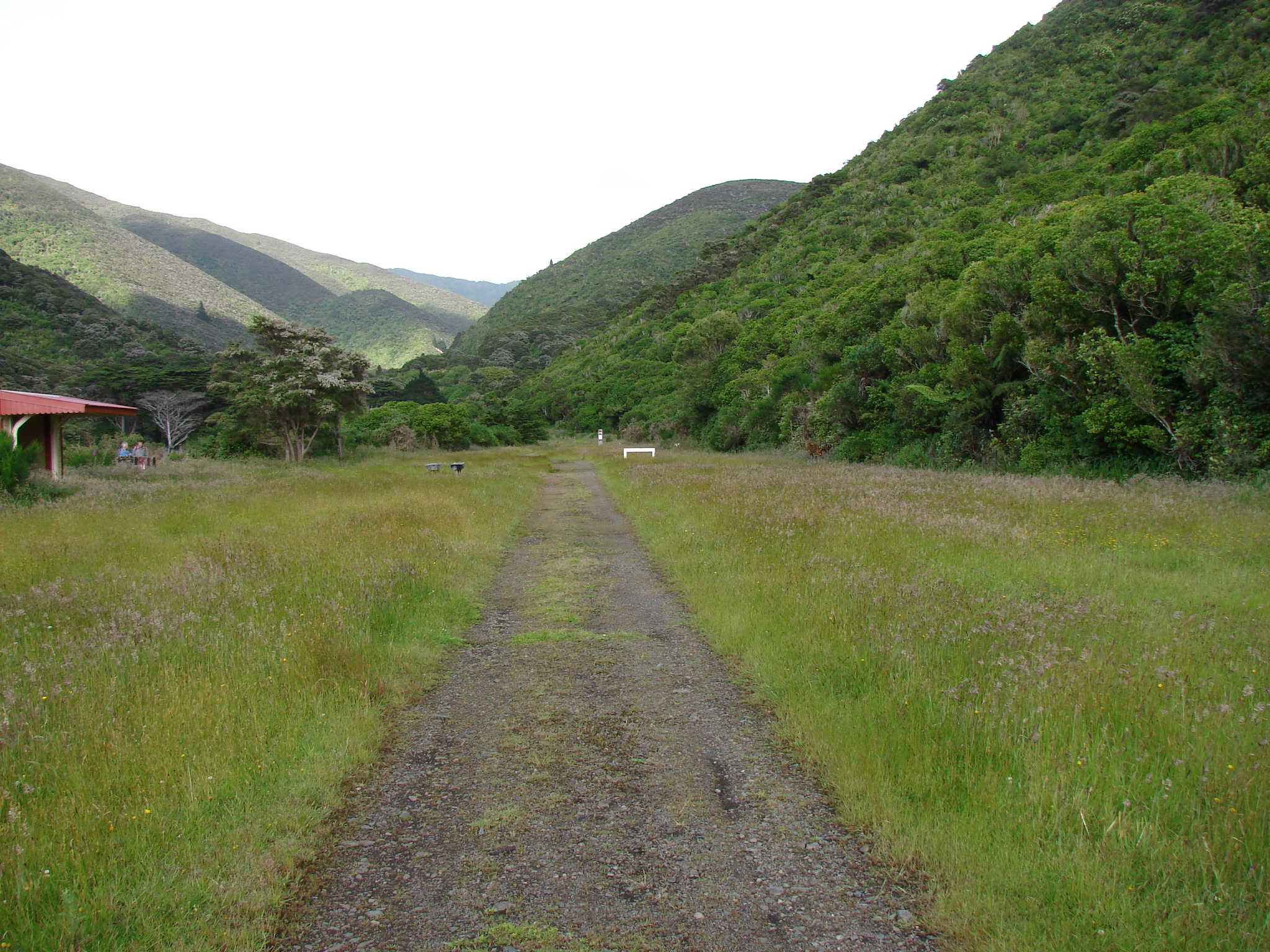
- Cross Creek station yard, shelter shed, and beginning of the Incline.
- Length: 22 km (14 mi)
- Location: Wellington, New Zealand
- Trailheads: Cross Creek: Kaitoke; 41.1678°S 175.2369°E: Maymorn; 41.1077°S 175.1375°E
- Use: Cycling; Hiking; Horse riding
- Highest point: 1,141 ft (348 m)
- Difficulty: Grade 2

The Remutaka Rail Trail (spelled Rimutaka Rail Trail prior to 2017) is a walking and cycling track in the North Island of New Zealand. It runs between Maymorn and Cross Creek, and follows 22 kilometres (14 mi) of the original route of the Wairarapa Line over the Remutaka Range between the Mangaroa Valley and the Wairarapa, including the historic Rimutaka Incline on the Wairarapa side. Parts of the trail are also used by vehicles both from the regional council and from forestry companies with tree plantations in the area; members of the public have limited vehicular access from the Kaitoke end to a car park, go-kart track and gun range. Access is also granted by permission to horse riders. Touring coaches have been used upon occasion to convey tourists and other visitors to various parts of the route.

The trail is a popular regional recreation facility and is used by more than 30,000 walkers, runners, and cyclists annually. It is designated as one of New Zealand's Great Rides, and is part of a network of walking and cycling trails in public parks and reserves in the area. Several forestry roads diverge from the rail trail that are also used for recreational purposes.

== History ==
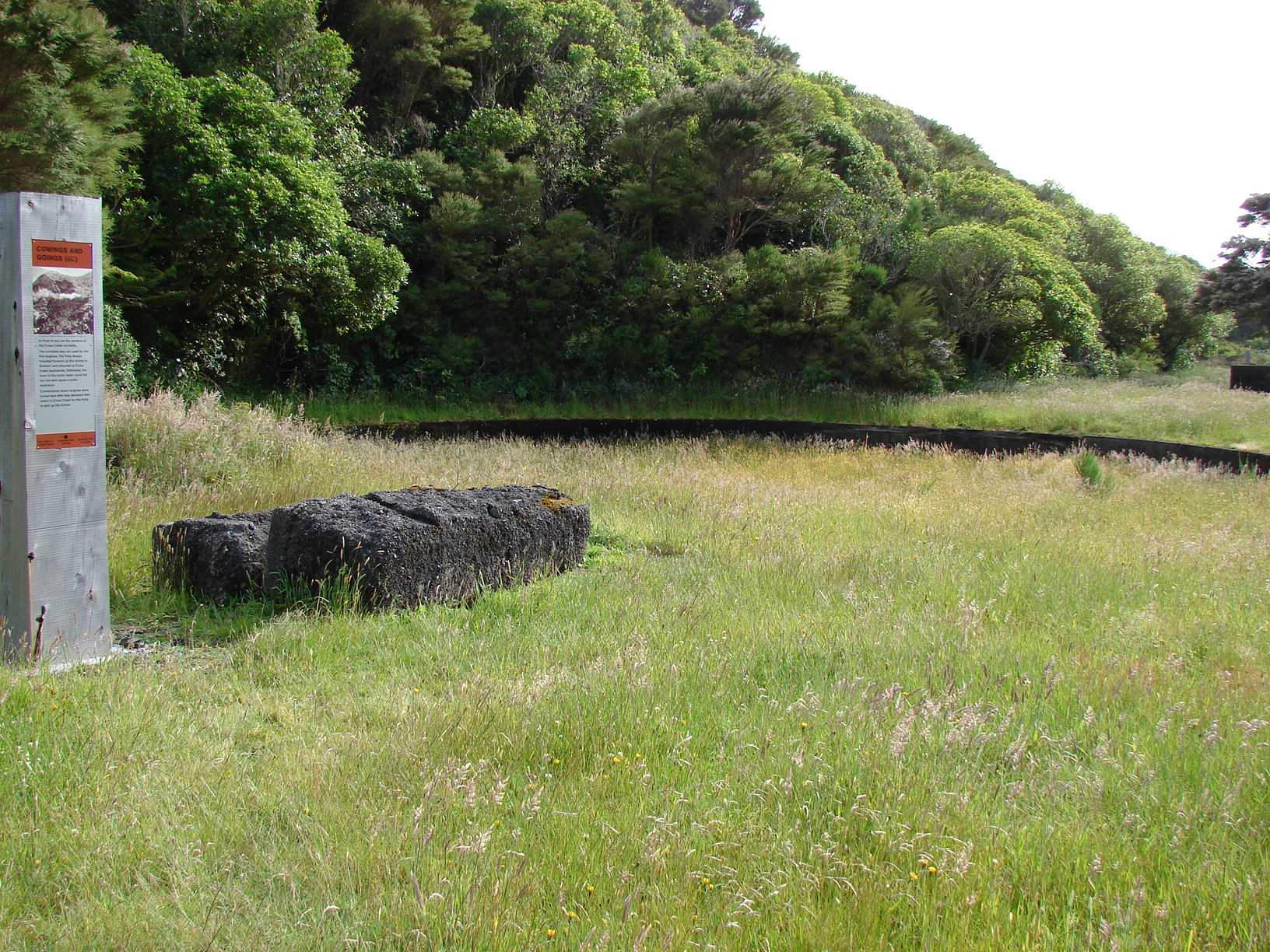
Cross Creek turntable pit

The Wellington City and Suburban Water Supply Board assumed ownership of the railway corridor land on the Wellington side of the Remutaka Ranges following closure of the railway line in 1955. They retained the railway bridges so as to maintain vehicular access to the area for forestry purposes. Trees were planted by forestry staff around the summit yard and along the route from the late 1950s to the early 1970s. Access was restricted, and it was rare for anyone to be granted permission to enter the area for recreation.

The Incline section became the responsibility of the New Zealand Forest Service. All railway-related structures were removed from Cross Creek and Summit in the years following closure of the line. The Cross Creek yard and incline section were gradually reclaimed by nature. The Siberia embankment collapsed during a severe storm in 1967 after its drainage became blocked. A similar problem caused the Summit tunnel to flood.

The publication of A Line Of Railway in 1976 and establishment of Featherston’s Fell Engine Museum helped spur interest in the Incline, prompting the Forest Service to provide permanent access to Cross Creek in 1984. In order to facilitate recreational use of the formation, it drained Summit Tunnel and cleared the Cross Creek yard and incline formation. A proposal mooted in the mid 1980s for a walkway between Cross Creek and Kaitoke culminated in the opening of the Rimutaka Rail Trail on 1 November 1987, a joint project between the Wellington Regional Council and the Department of Conservation. Shelter sheds were constructed at Cross Creek and Summit, and several picnic areas along the route. A retaining wall and culverts were installed near the entrance to Price's Tunnel in 2009 by the Department of Conservation to remedy a slip that occurred the previous year.

== Management of the trail ==
The Cross Creek to Summit section is managed by the Department of Conservation, Summit to Maymorn by the Greater Wellington Regional Council. After Kaitoke the trail runs through Tunnel Gully Reserve.

If traversing the entire length of the rail trail, a trip can be timed to start at Cross Creek and meet a Wairarapa Connection train at Maymorn station.

=== Cross Creek – Kaitoke ===
This 18-kilometre (11 mi) section can be accessed from either end. At Kaitoke there are signposted directions along Incline Rd off SH 2 to the start of the formation, 1 1/4 km along which is a car park. On the Wairarapa side there is a turn-off to the Cross Creek car park from Western Lake Road, about 10 kilometres (6.2 mi) south-west of Featherston. From the Cross Creek car park it is a 1/2 hour walk to the Cross Creek station yard. About six hours should be allowed to traverse the entire distance between Cross Creek and Kaitoke.

The following car parks are available for users of the trail:

- Cross Creek: 41°10′5.59″S 175°14′11.92″E
- Kaitoke: 41°5′7.42″S 175°11′4.20″E

Points of interest along this section include:

- Cross Creek yard, the site of Cross Creek railway station
- Price’s Tunnel, 98 metres (322 ft) long on an S-curve
- Horseshoe Gully, the site of the Siberia embankment
- Siberia Tunnel, 108 metres (354 ft) long
- Summit Tunnel, 584 metres (1,916 ft) long
- Summit yard, the site of Summit railway station
- Ladle Bend Creek bridge, 70 metres (230 ft) long, restored by the regional council in 2002
- Pakuratahi bridge, 28 metres (92 ft) long, rebuilt in 1910 and restored by the regional council in 2001
- Rimutaka Tunnel ventilation shaft, built after it was decided to dieselise the line instead of electrifying it as originally planned, and it was found that there was insufficient natural ventilation to operate diesel locomotives through the tunnel
- Pakuratahi Tunnel, 73 metres (240 ft) long
- Munitions Bend bridge, the footbridge here was installed in 2003

=== Kaitoke – Maymorn ===
Though this 4.25-kilometre (2.64 mi) section can be walked or cycled from either end, access is easiest from the Maymorn end of the trail. At the end of Plateau Road is a car park for recreational users of the Tunnel Gully reserve, from which access can be gained to the rail trail. At the intersection of Maymorn Road and Parkes Line Road, near Maymorn railway station and car park, is an access road which joins with the rail trail on the hillside above the Rimutaka Tunnel portal. From the Kaitoke end, access to the rail trail can be gained either from one of several forestry roads which join up with the Kaitoke – Cross Creek section of the trail, or from a forestry road that connects with Kaitoke Loop Road about 2/3 km west of Station Drive.

The following parking facilities are near the Maymorn end of this section of the trail:

- Plateau Road: 41°6′14.74″S 175°9′13.43″E
- Maymorn railway station

There are no car parking facilities at the Kaitoke end.

Points of interest along this section of the route include:

- Mangaroa Tunnel, 152 metres long

== Future ==
In 2011 the Rimutaka Incline Railway Heritage Trust put forward a proposal to reinstate the railway line over the Remutaka Range. It was withdrawn in February 2012. The proposal was to incorporate all of the former railway formation that currently comprises the rail trail.

The plan meant laying of new track would occur in the future. The trust has worked on stage one of their plan, which involves the development of facilities at Maymorn. Later stages include the development of alternative facilities for current users of the rail trail prior to the laying of track.

== Great Ride (Petone-Cross Creek-Ōrongorongo) ==
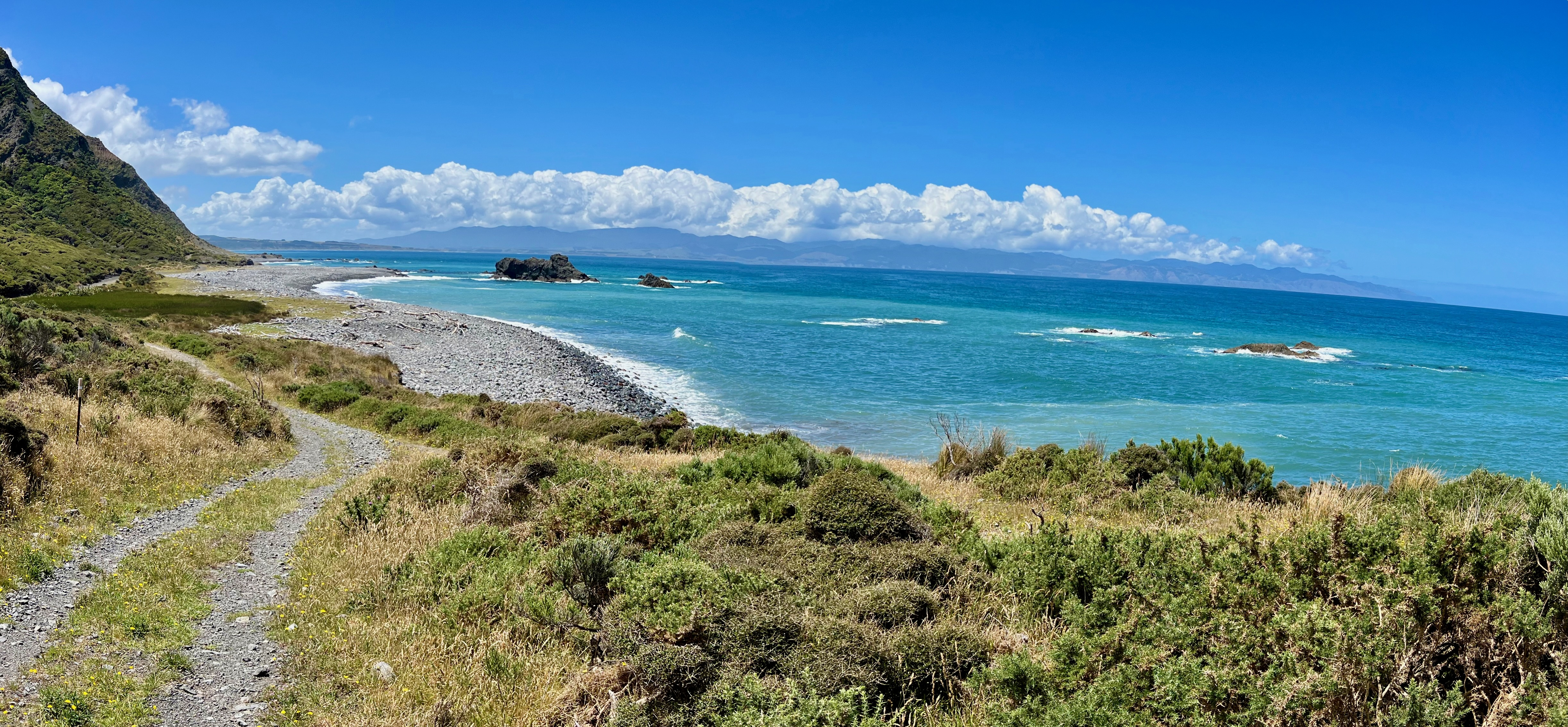
Fisherman's Rock and the coast to Cape Palliser from the farm track section of the Great Ride

In 2013 the Rail Trail became part of a Great Ride route linking Petone via Maymorn, Cross Creek, Ocean Beach and Ōrongorongo in a loop. The first 35 km (22 mi) of the Ride follows Hutt River Trail to Maymorn. The next 25 km (16 mi) uses the Rail Trail to reach Cross Creek. Another 42.5 km (26.4 mi) of the Ride is then on Western Lake Road, passing Lakes Wairarapa and Ōnoke, to reach Palliser Bay at Ocean Beach. A rough farm track runs 18 km (11 mi) via Turakirae Head to the end of the Ride at Ōrongorongo. Due to soft sand near the beach and rough rocks over stream fans, a few short sections of the track cannot be cycled. From Ōrongorongo it is 30 km (19 mi) back to Petone. A road runs via Wainuiomata, or a fractionally shorter route, largely on cycleways and with less climbing, is via Baring Head, Pencarrow and Eastbourne to Petone. In 2019/20 Remutaka was the third most popular of the 22 Great Rides then in use, with 218,770 cycle and walking trips, though only 1,976 completing the whole Ride, as it "lacks sufficient infrastructure".

== Gallery ==
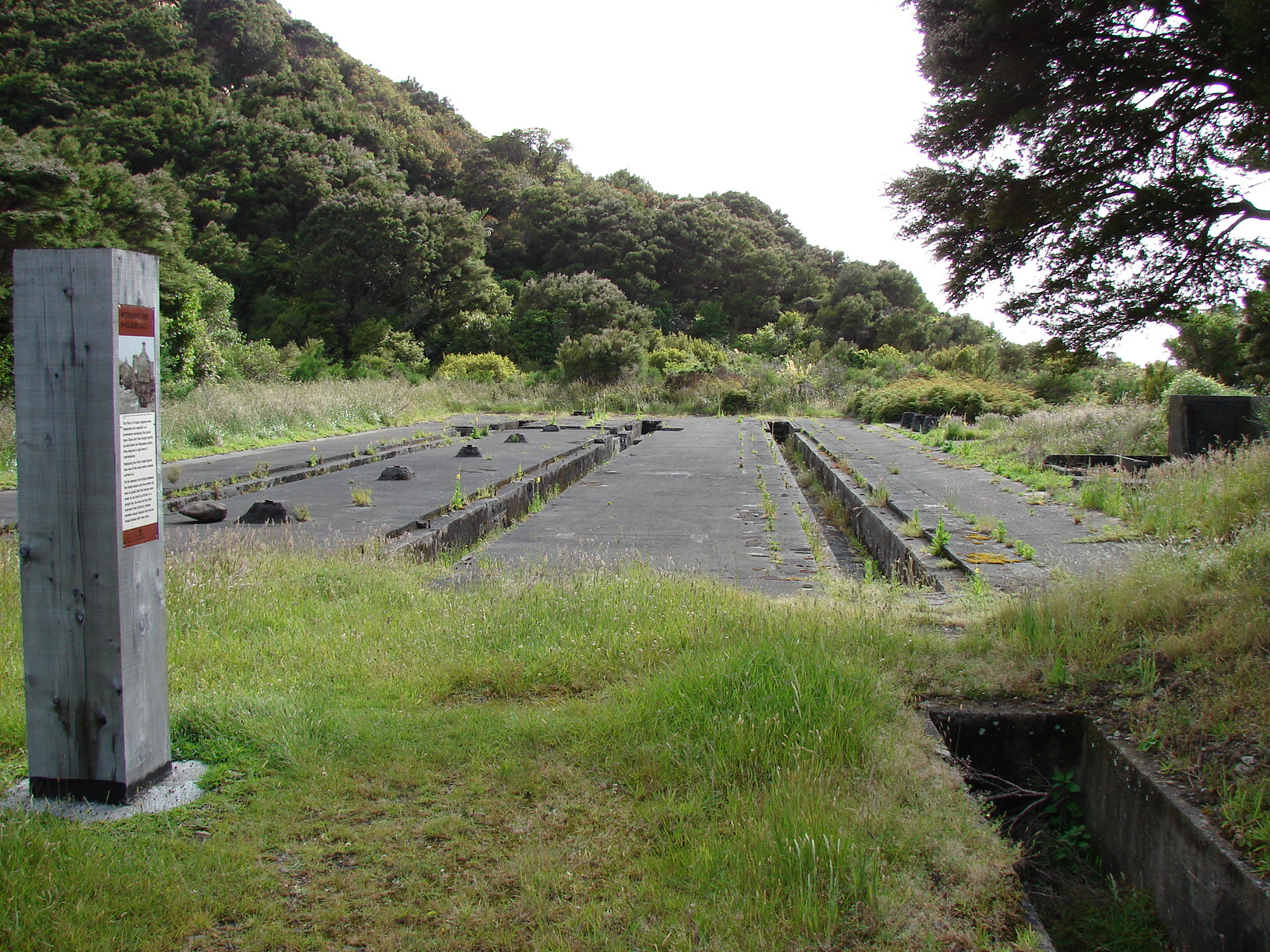
Foundations of the Cross Creek locomotive shed

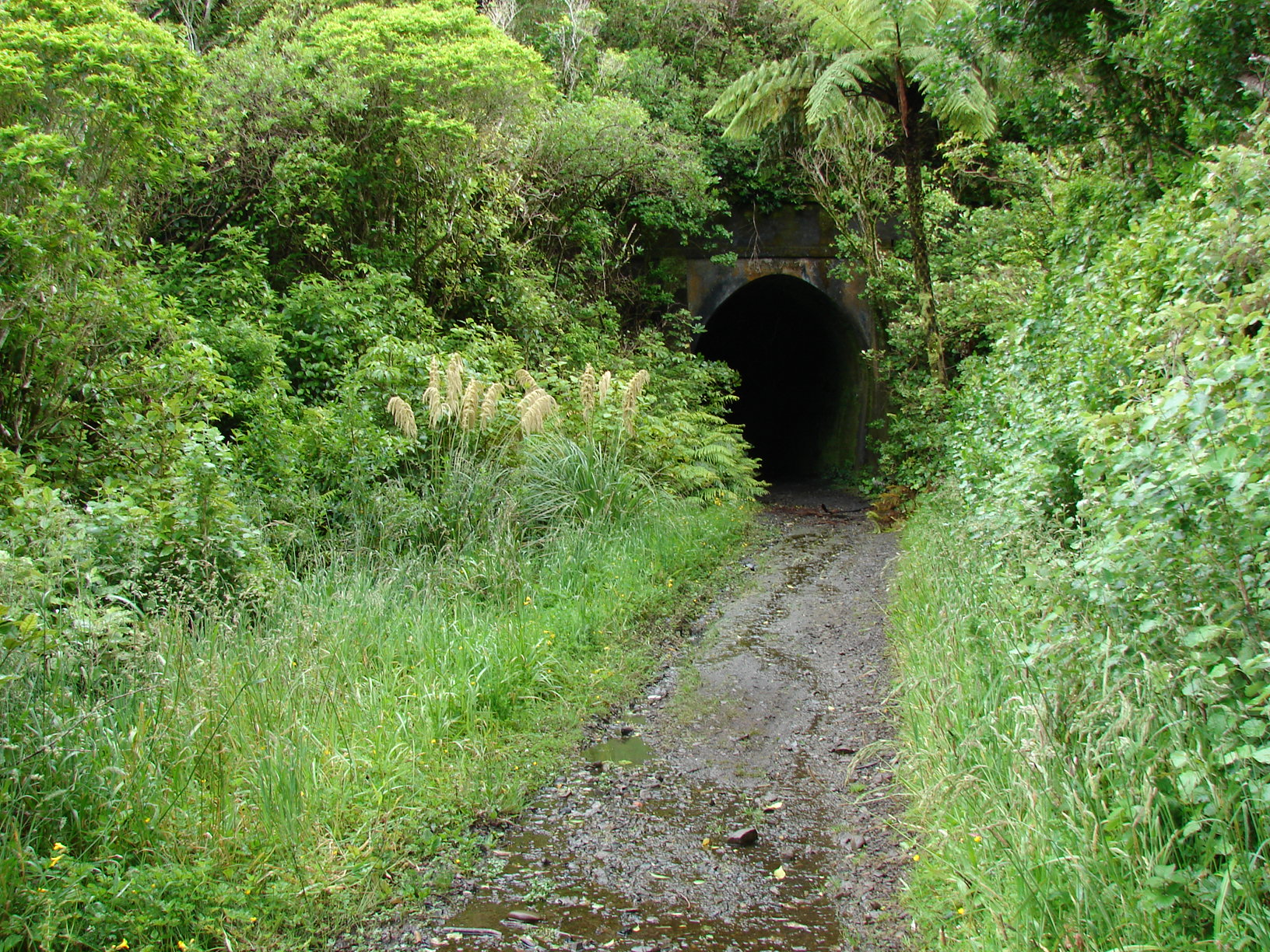
Southern portal of Price's Tunnel

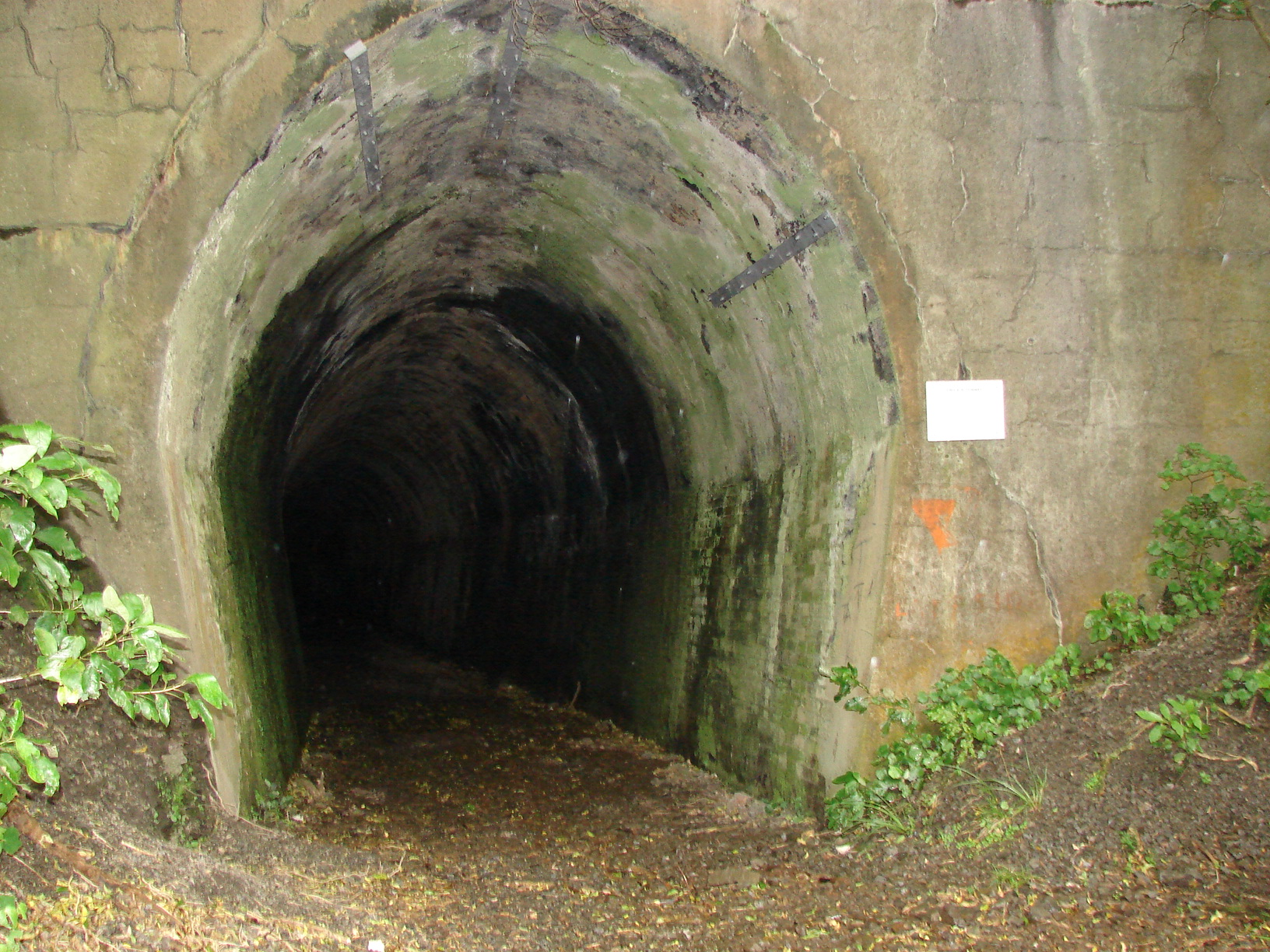
Northern portal of Price's Tunnel

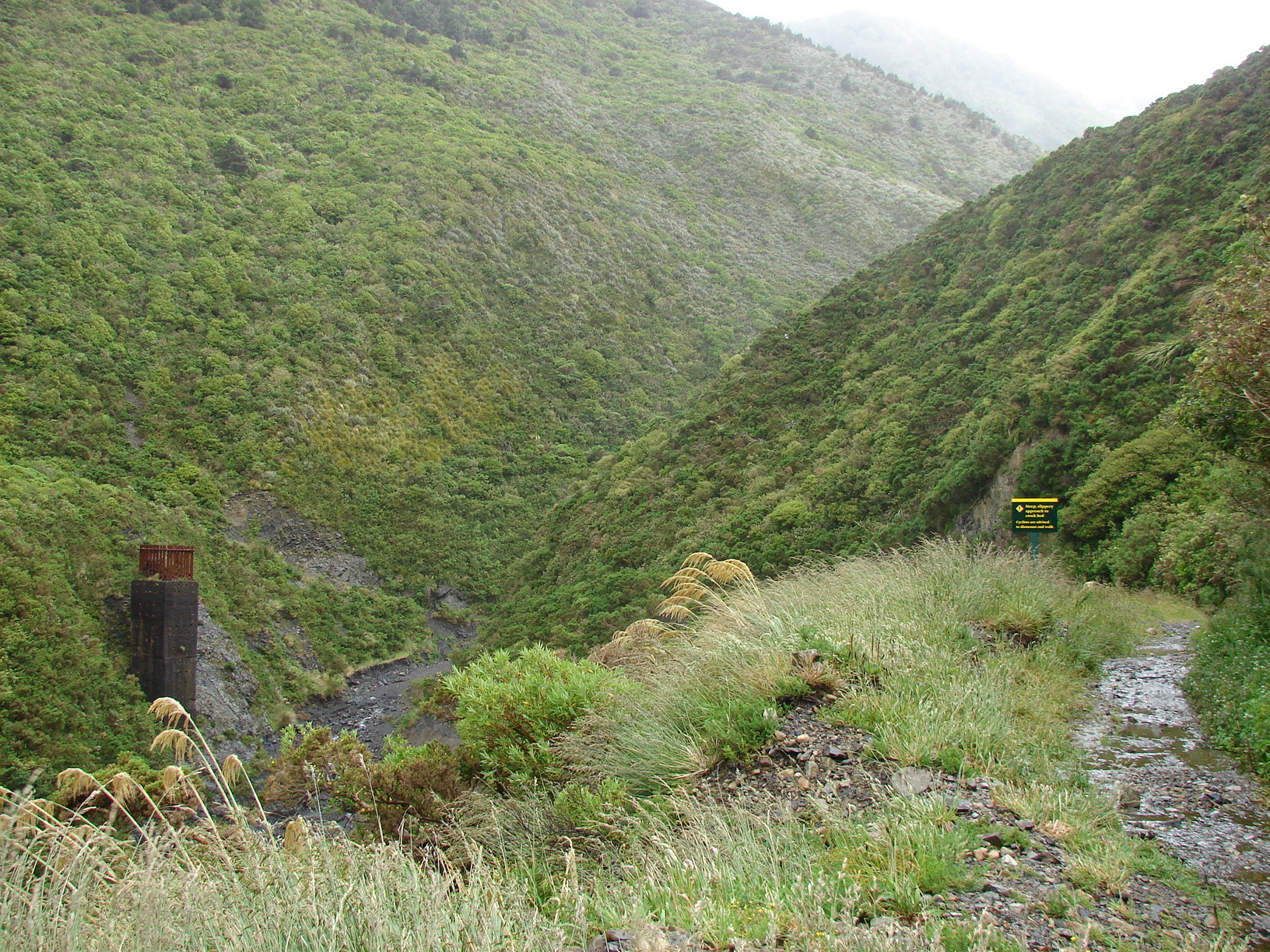
Horseshoe Gully and Siberia embankment washout

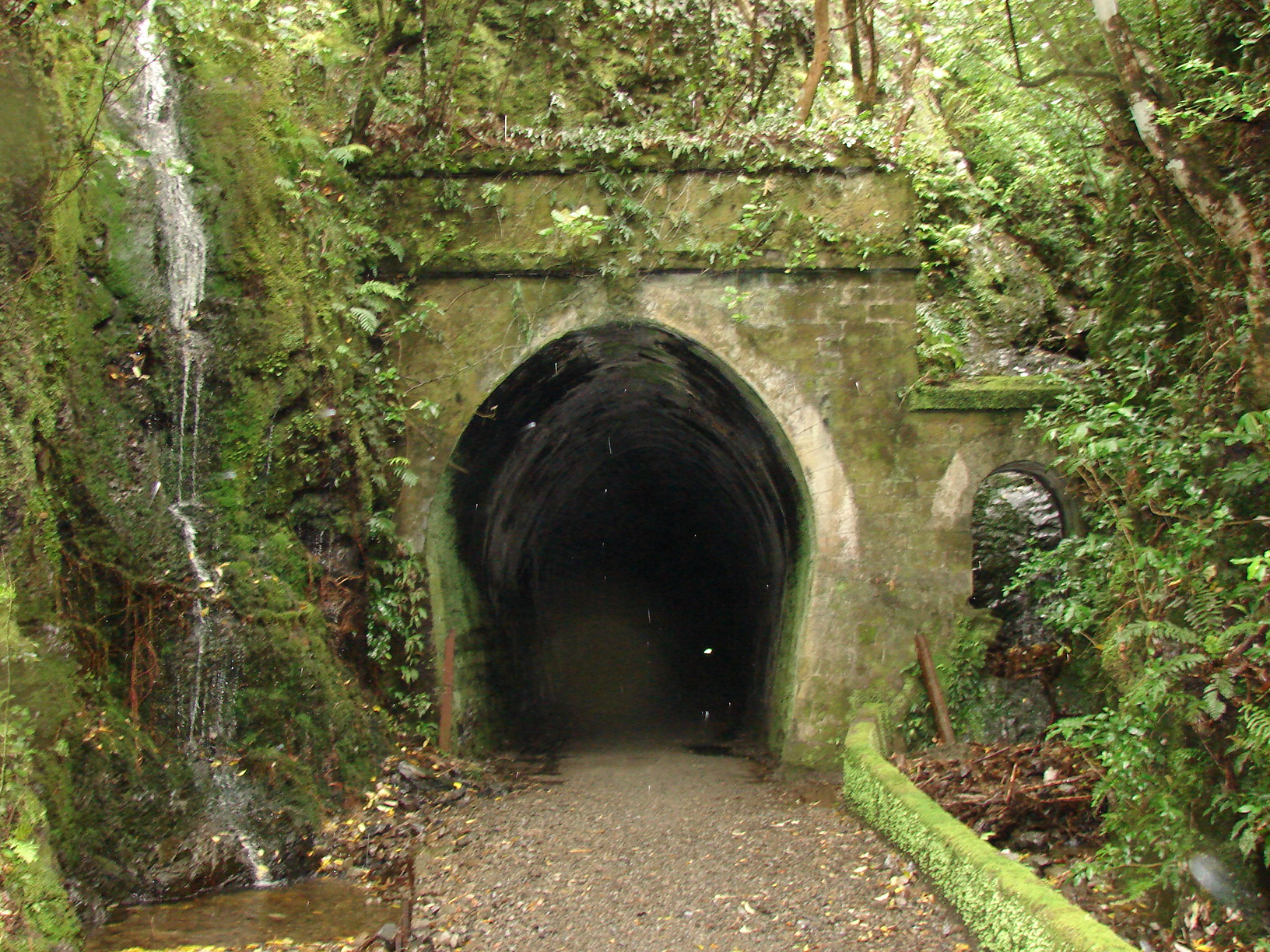
Southern portal of Summit Tunnel

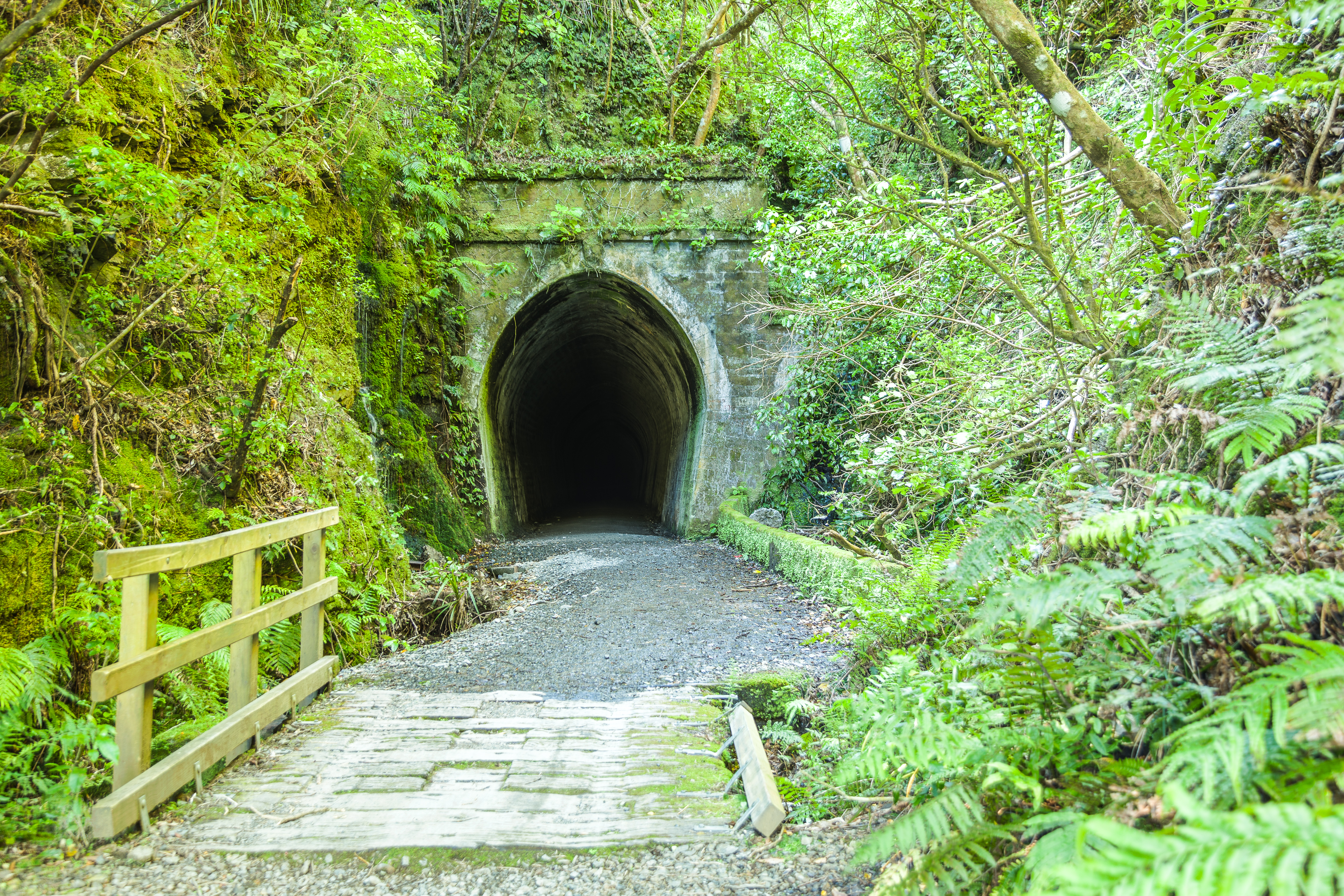
Bridge and southern portal of Summit Tunnel

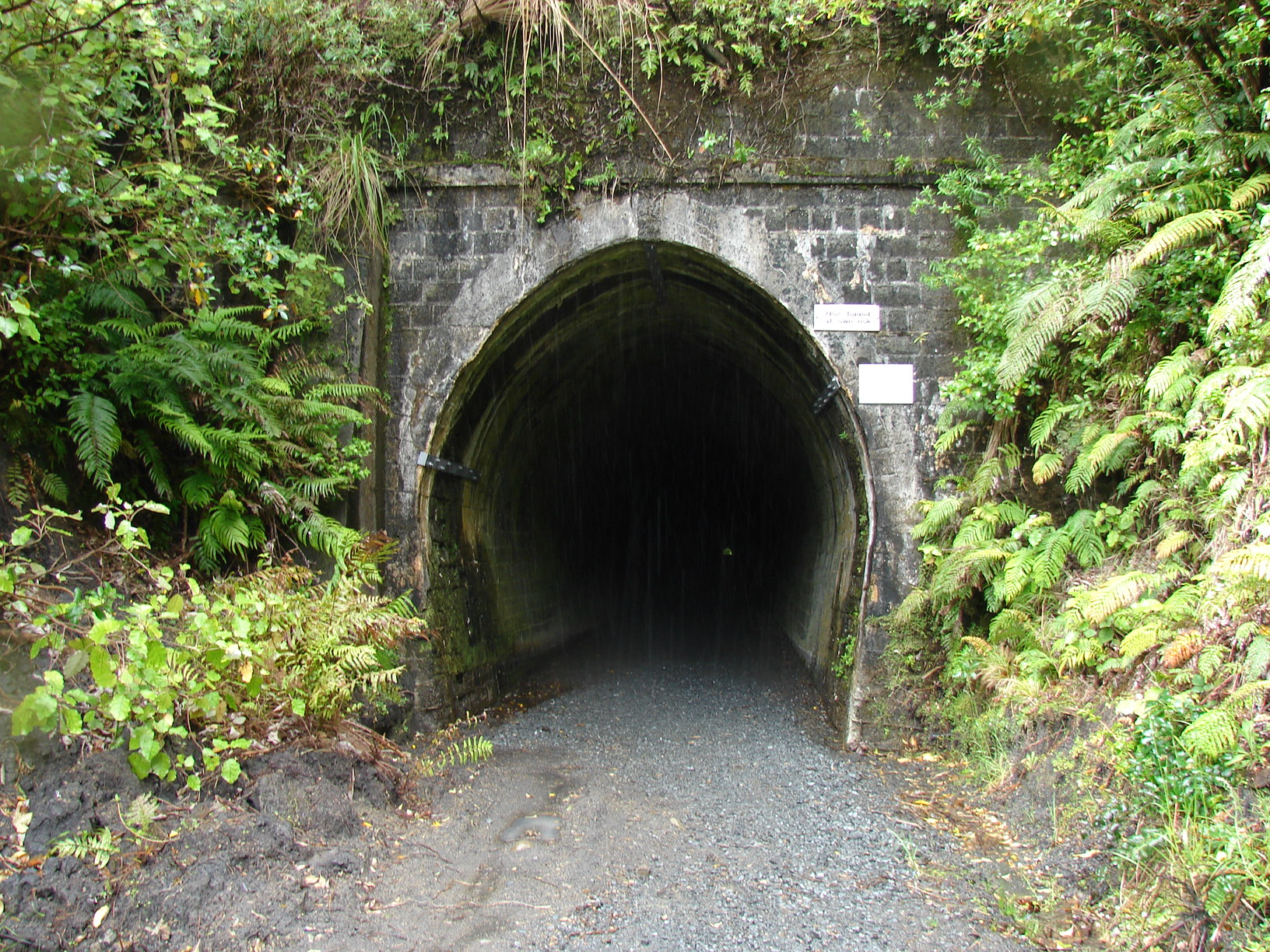
Northern portal of Summit Tunnel

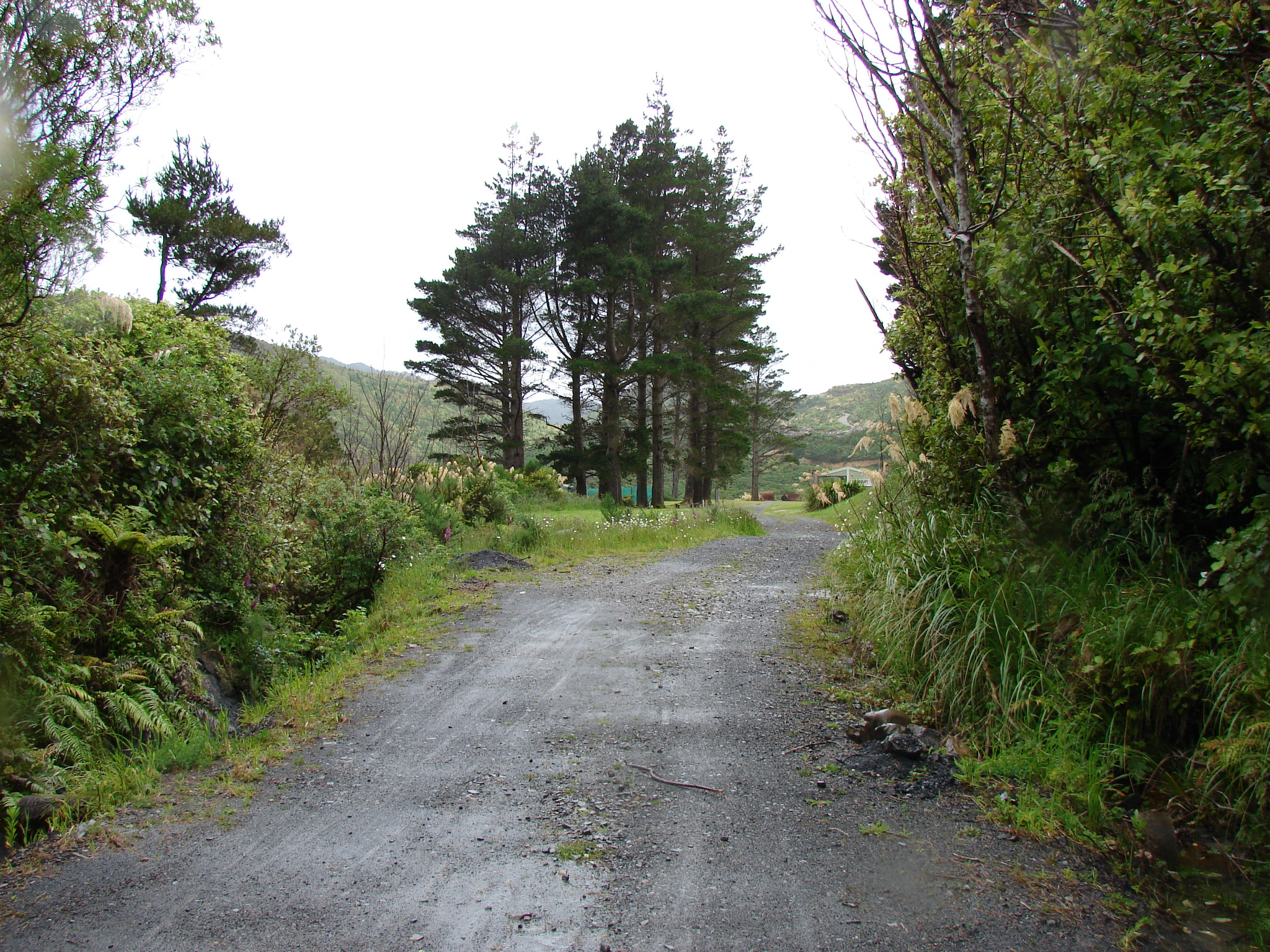
Cutting and southern approach to Summit yard from the tunnel

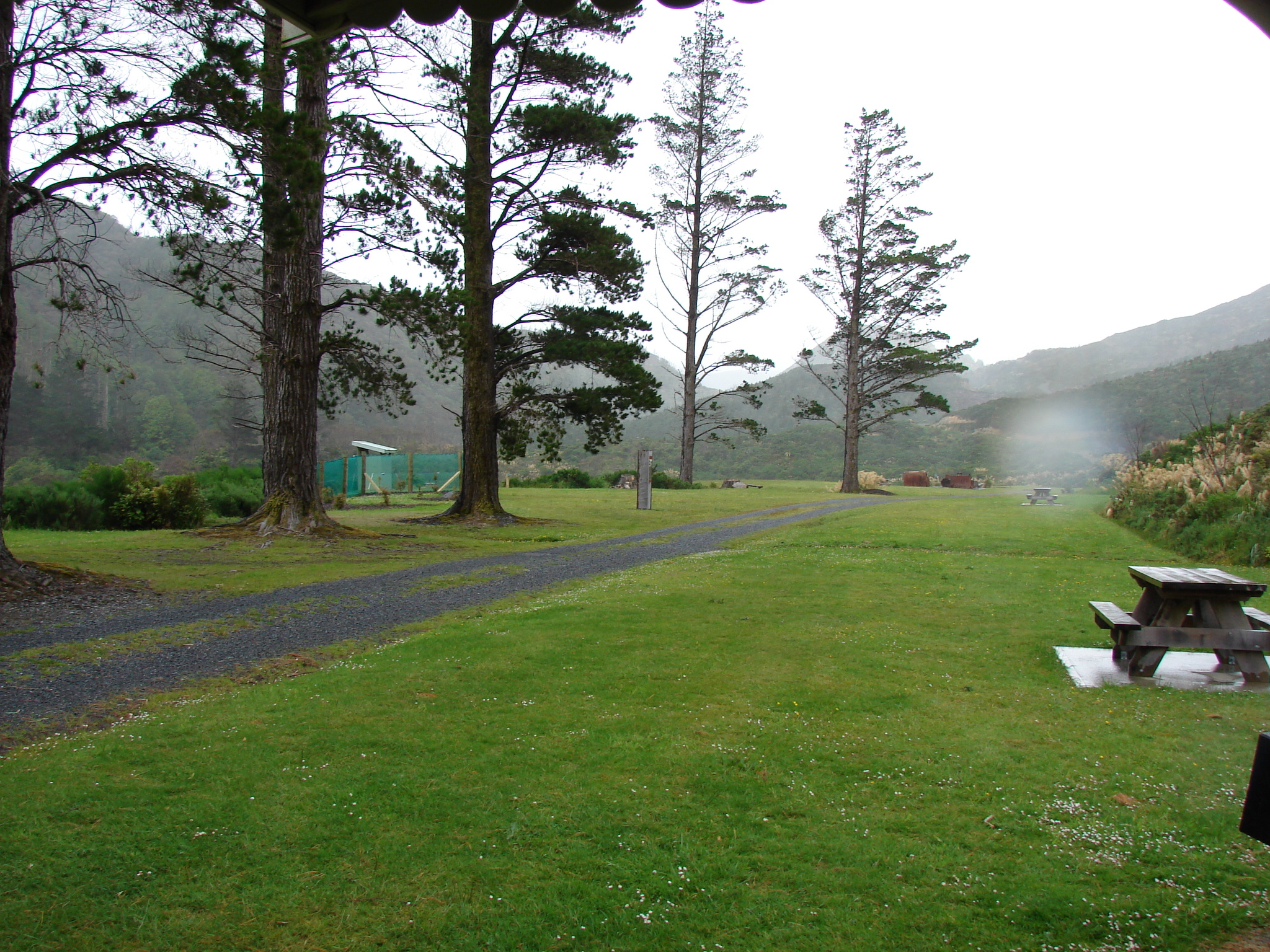
Summit yard

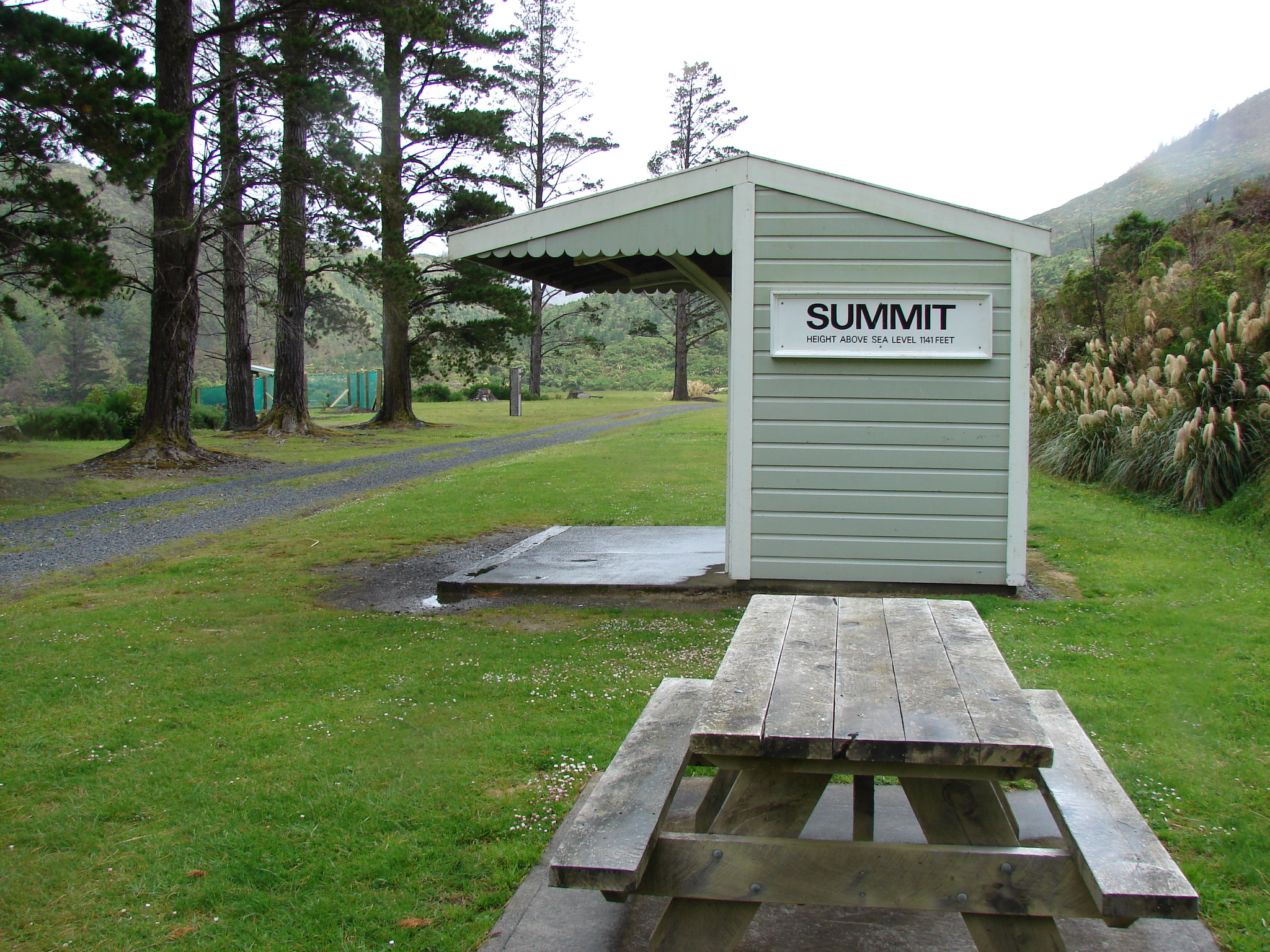
Summit shelter shed

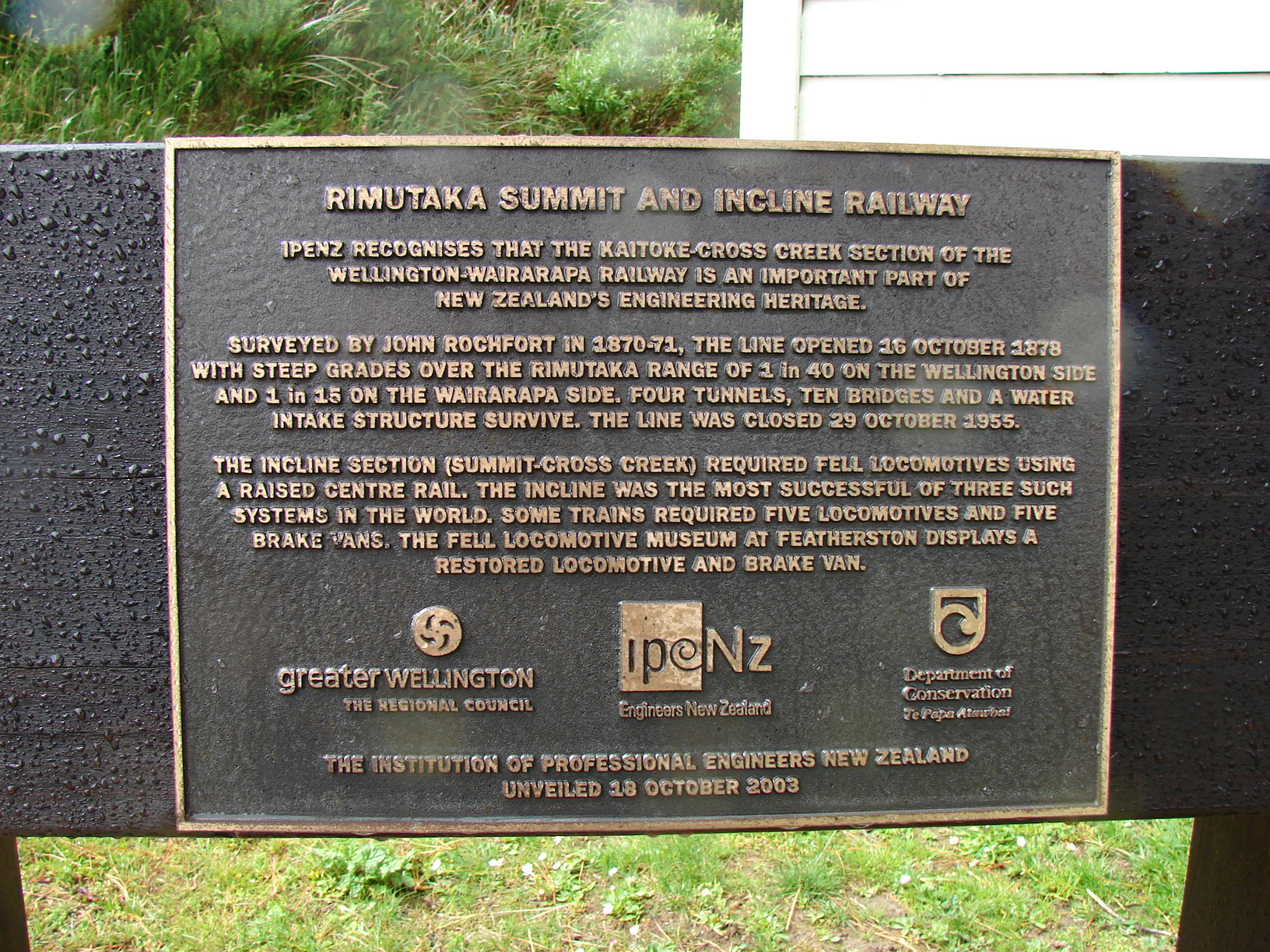
Institute of Professional Engineers New Zealand plaque

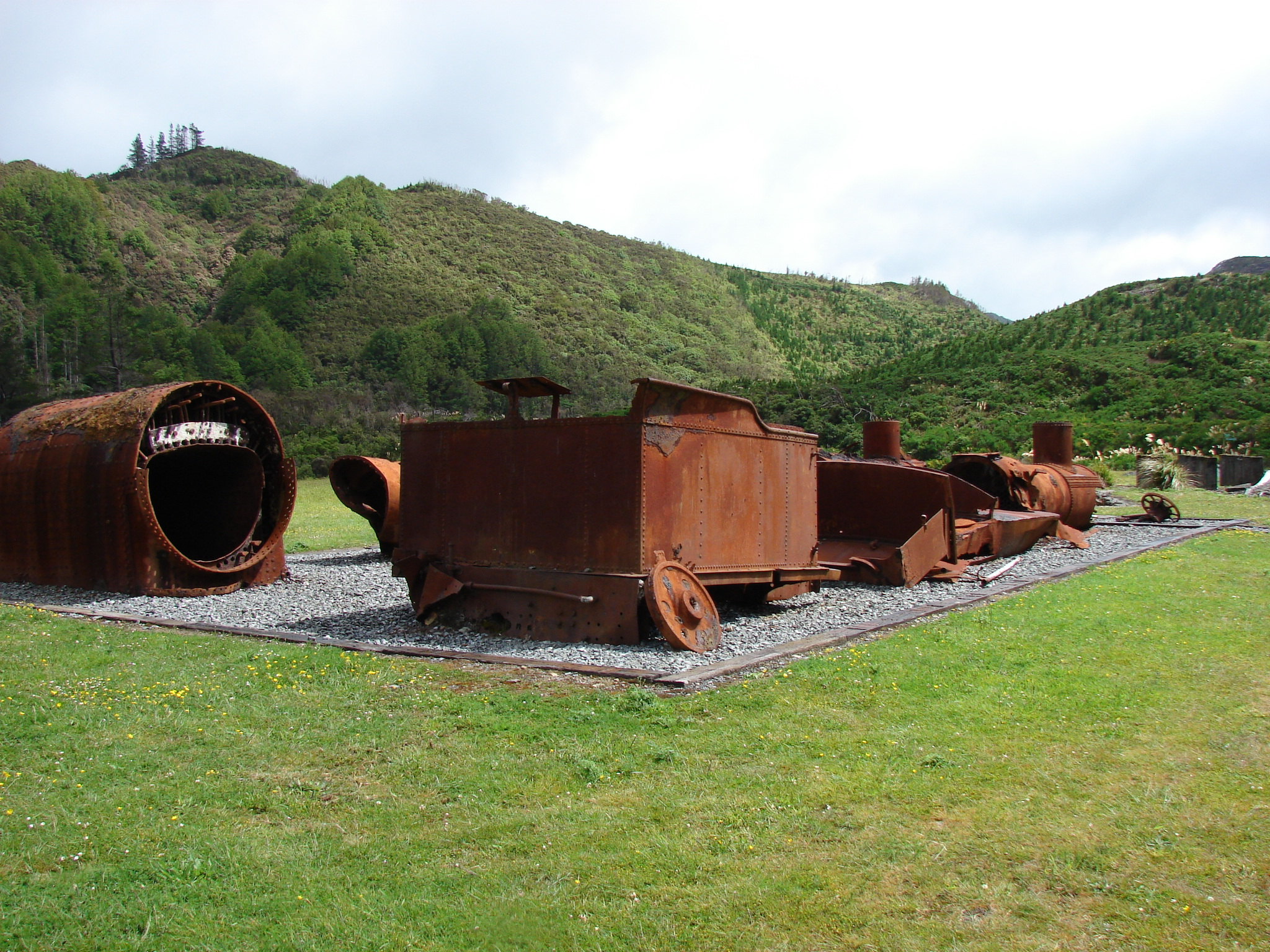
Locomotive remnants in Summit yards

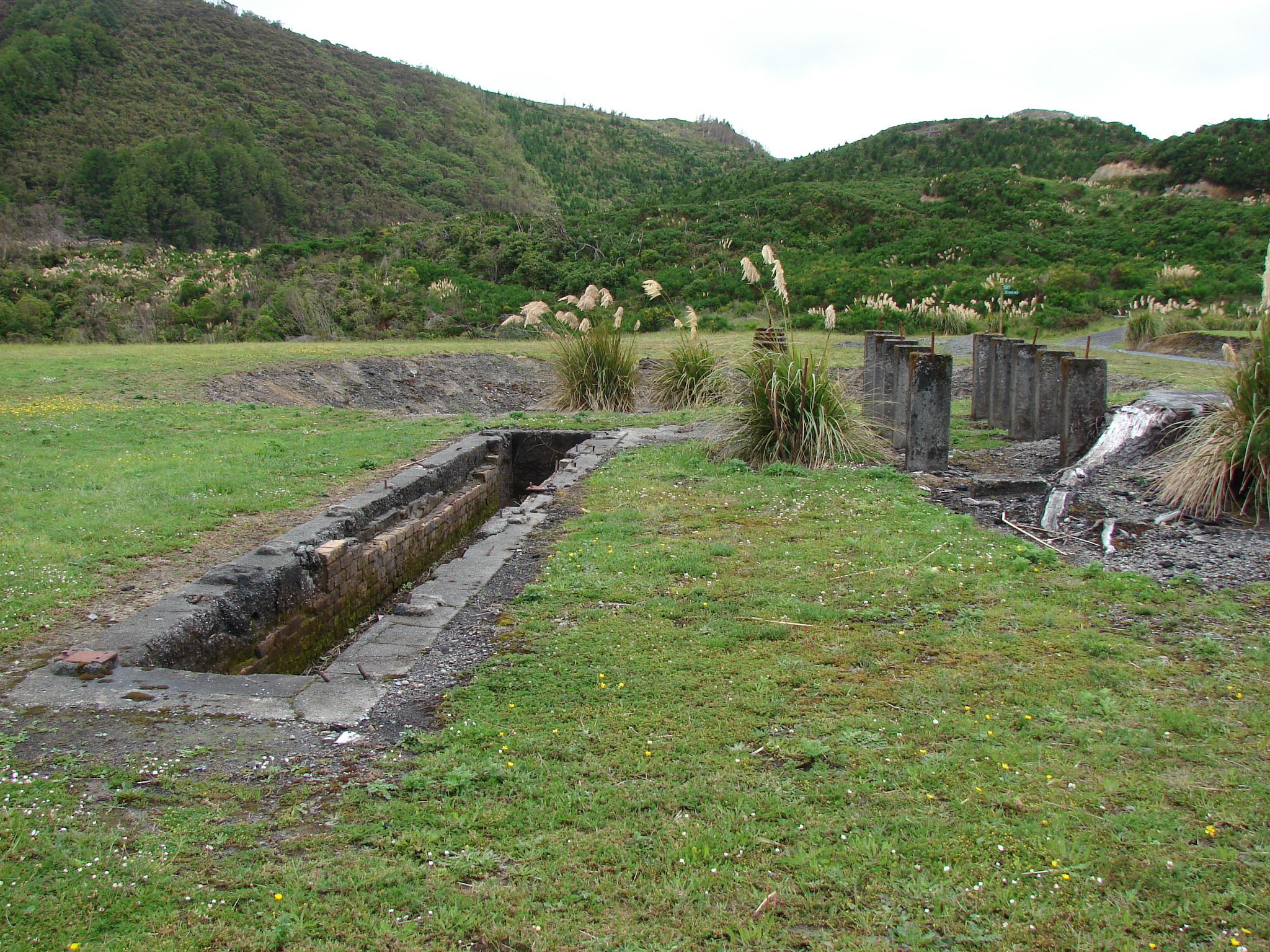
Ash pit in Summit yard

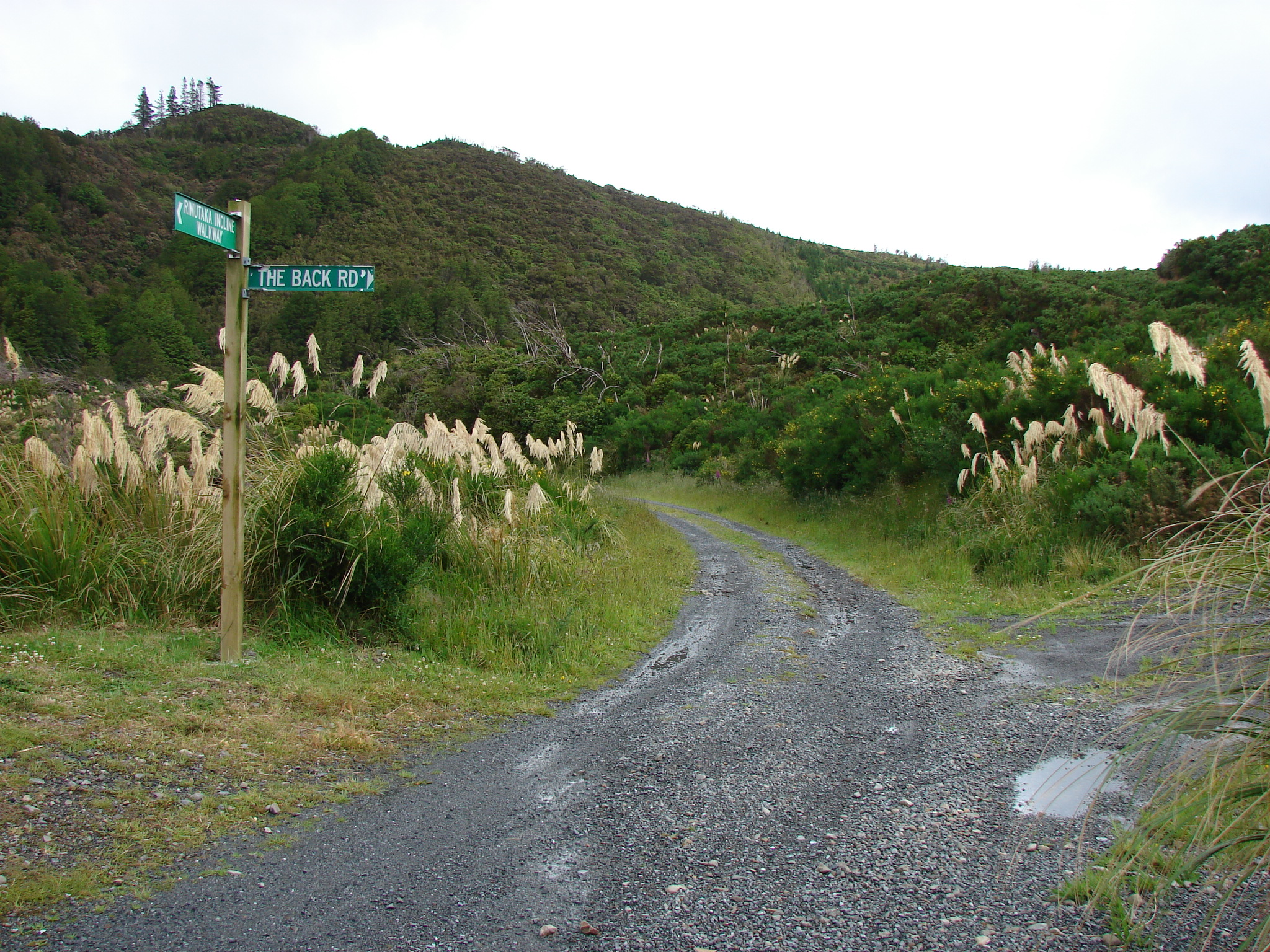
Northern approach to Summit yard

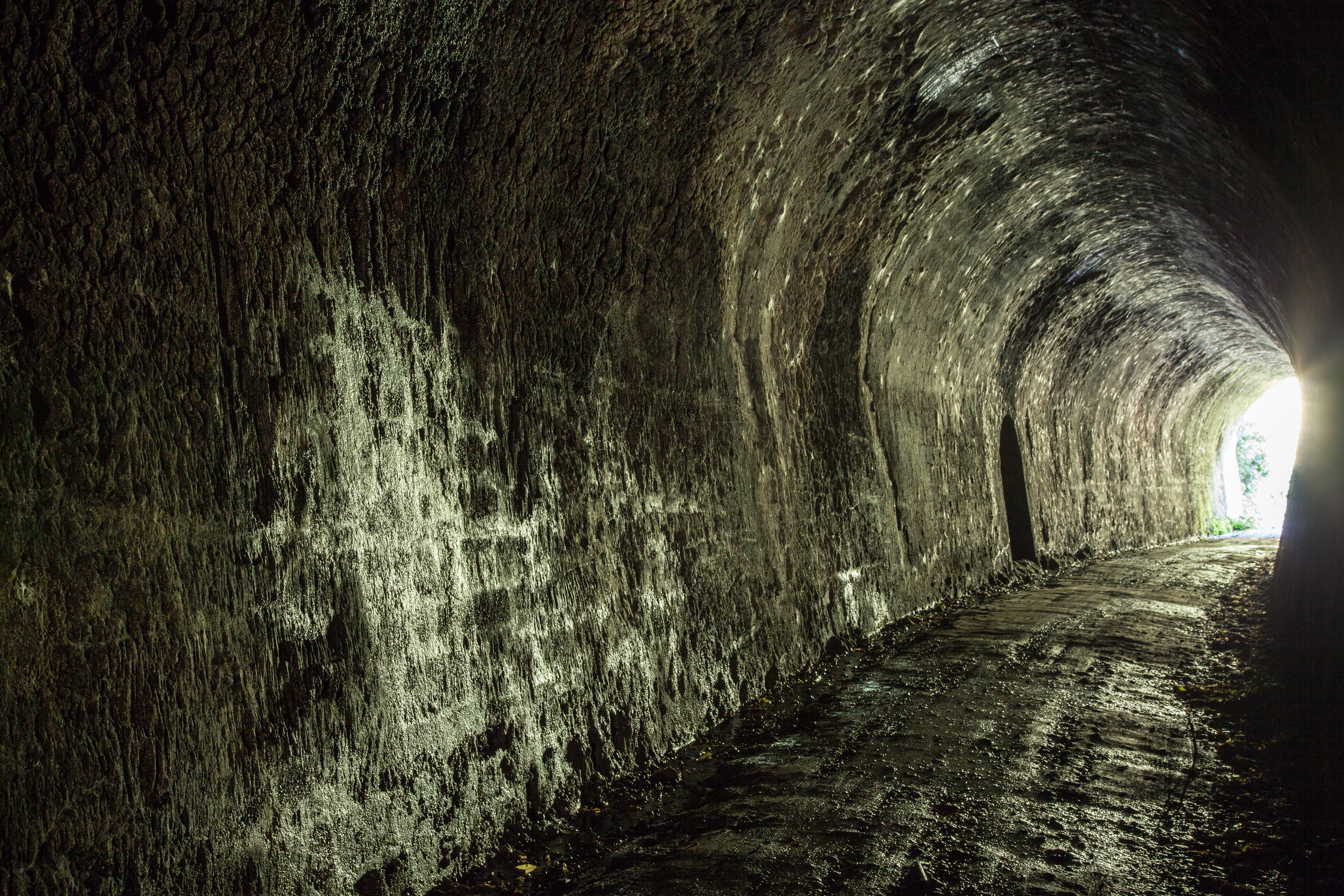
Siberia Tunnel

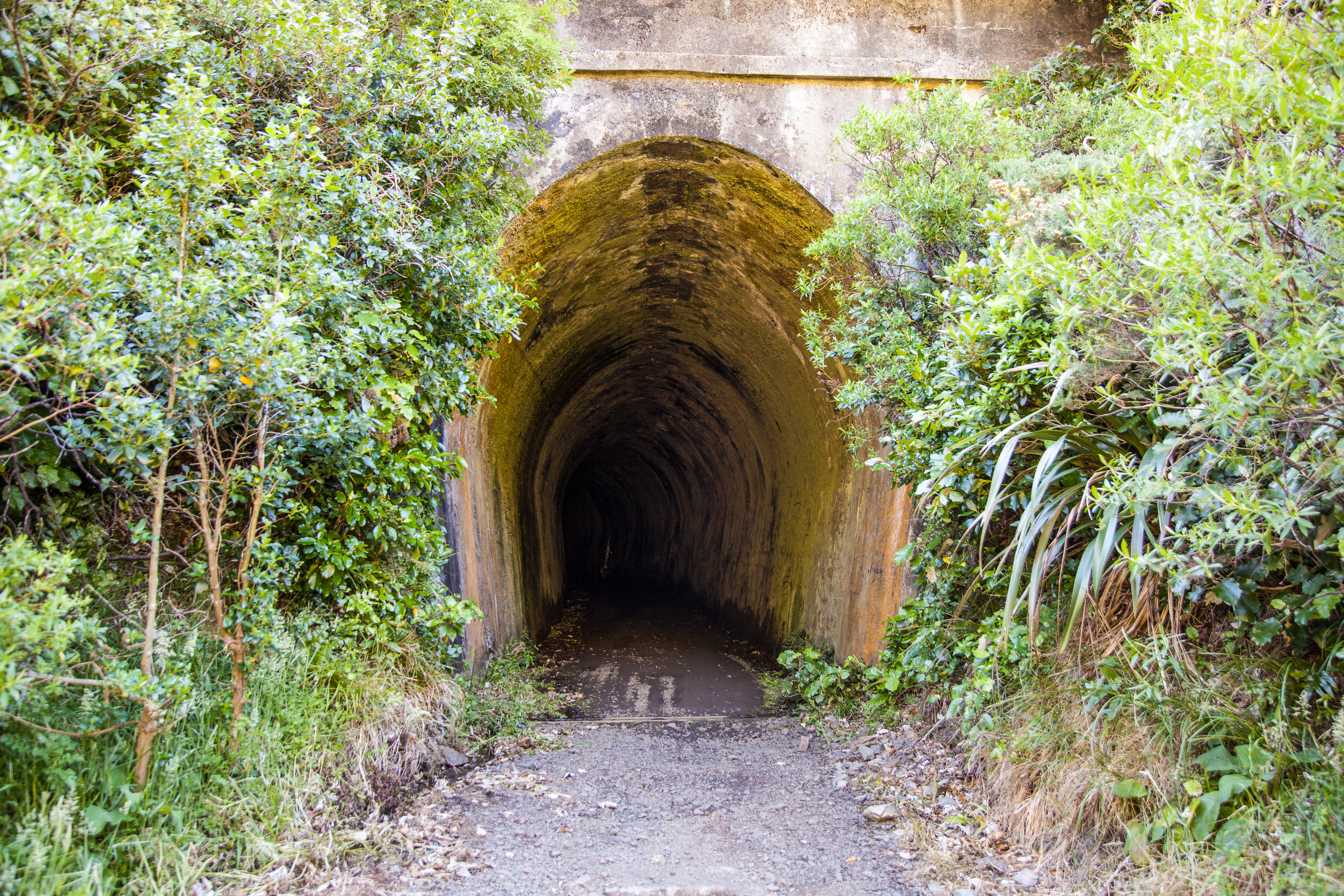
Siberia Tunnel

== See also ==
- Cross Creek railway station
- Kaitoke railway station
- List of rail trails
- Maymorn railway station
- Rimutaka Incline
- Rimutaka Tunnel
- Summit railway station, New Zealand
