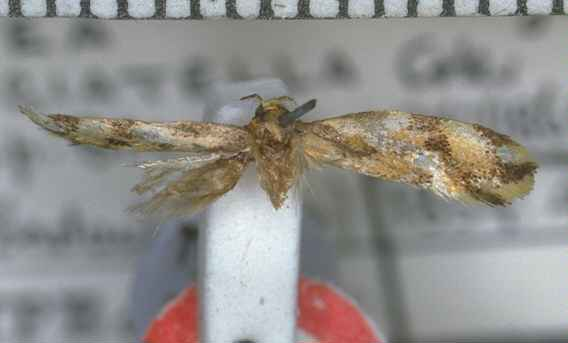
- Male holotype

Scientific classification
- Kingdom: Animalia
- Phylum: Arthropoda
- Class: Insecta
- Order: Lepidoptera
- Family: Oecophoridae
- Genus: Tingena
- Species: T. plagiatella

Binomial name
- Tingena plagiatella (Walker, 1863)

Synonyms
- Tinea plagiatella Walker, 1863; Borkhausenia plagiatella (Walker, 1863)

= Tingena plagiatella =

Species of moth, endemic to New Zealand

Tingena plagiatella is a species of moth in the family Oecophoridae. It is endemic to New Zealand and has been observed in both the North and South Islands. This species inhabits light native bush or scrubland. Adults of this species are on the wing from November to January.

== Taxonomy ==
Francis Walker described this species in 1863 using specimens collected by D. Bolton in Auckland and named the species Tinea plagiatella. In 1915 Edward Meyrick placed this species in the genus Borkhausenia. In 1926 Alfred Philpott studied the genitalia of the male of this species. George Hudson discussed this species under the name Borkhausenia plagiatella in his 1928 publication The butterflies and moths of New Zealand. In 1988 J. S. Dugdale placed this species within the genus Tingena. The male holotype specimen is held in the Natural History Museum, London.

== Description ==
Meyrick described this species as follows:

Male . Whitish. Head and thorax slightly tinged with ochraceous. Abdomen brownish cinereous above, extending much beyond the hind wings. Wings long, narrow. Fore wings hardly acute, irregularly speckled with brown; a blackish streak extending from the base; two blackish spots in the disk, opposite two others on the interior border; a white spot behind the second blackish spot; three brown costal spots; two brown exterior streaks, one extending to the fore part of the exterior border, the other to the interior angle; two diffuse ochraceous discal patches; exterior border extremely oblique. Hind wings aeneous. Length of the body 2 1/2 lines; of the wings 8 lines.

== Distribution ==
This species is endemic to New Zealand. It has been observed in Auckland, Tokaanu, Ōrongorongo Valley in the Wellington region and Arthur's Pass. This species has also been found in a site of ecological significance in Christchurch as set out in the Christchurch District Plan as well as at Rakaia Island in Canterbury.

== Behaviour ==
Adults of this species are on the wing from November to January.

== Habitat and hosts ==
This species inhabits light native forest or scrubland. The larvae of this species feeds on leaf litter.
