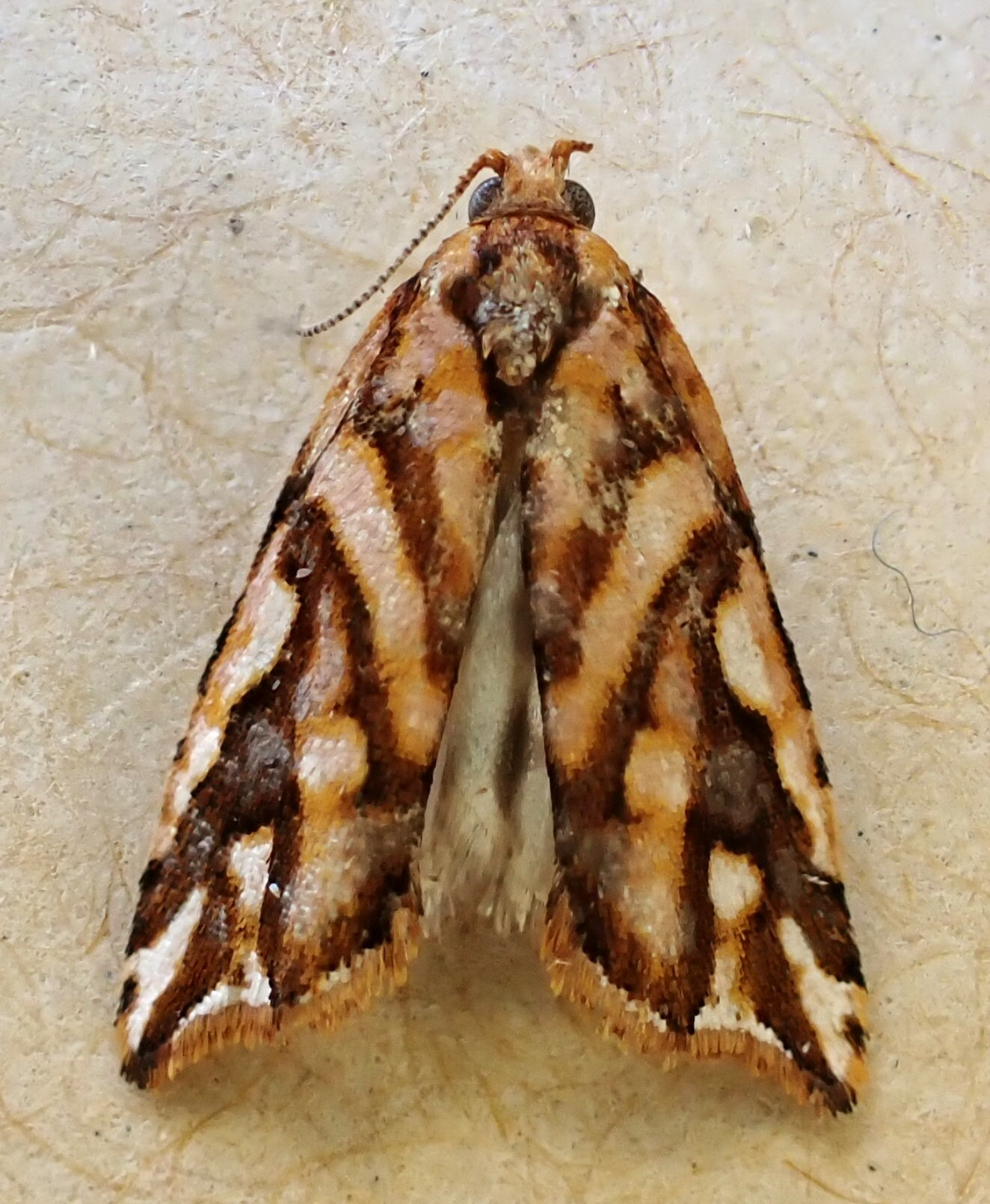
- Pyrgotis plinthoglypta seen on the Coromandel Peninsula

Scientific classification
- Kingdom: Animalia
- Phylum: Arthropoda
- Clade: Pancrustacea
- Class: Insecta
- Order: Lepidoptera
- Family: Tortricidae
- Genus: Pyrgotis
- Species: P. plinthoglypta

Binomial name
- Pyrgotis plinthoglypta Meyrick, 1892

Synonyms
- Capua plinthoglypta (Meyrick, 1892)

= Pyrgotis plinthoglypta =

Species of moth endemic to New Zealand

Pyrgotis plinthoglypta is a species of moth of the family Tortricidae. It is endemic to New Zealand and is found throughout the whole country. The preferred habitat of this moth is native forest. Larvae feed on rimu leaves from under a silken web. They pupate in loose cocoons amongst rimu foliage. Adults are on the wing from October to May and are night flying. They are attracted to light and can be collected by beating their host tree. The adult moth resembles a small dried fragment of rimu foliage when at rest.

== Taxonomy ==
This species was first described by Edward Meyrick in 1892 using a specimen collected in Wellington by George Hudson. In 1928 Hudson discussed and illustrated this species in his book The butterflies and moths of New Zealand under the name Capua plinthoglypta. In 1971 and again in 1988 J. S. Dugdale confirmed the placement of this species in the genus Pyrgotis. The male holotype specimen is held at the Natural History Museum, London.

== Description ==
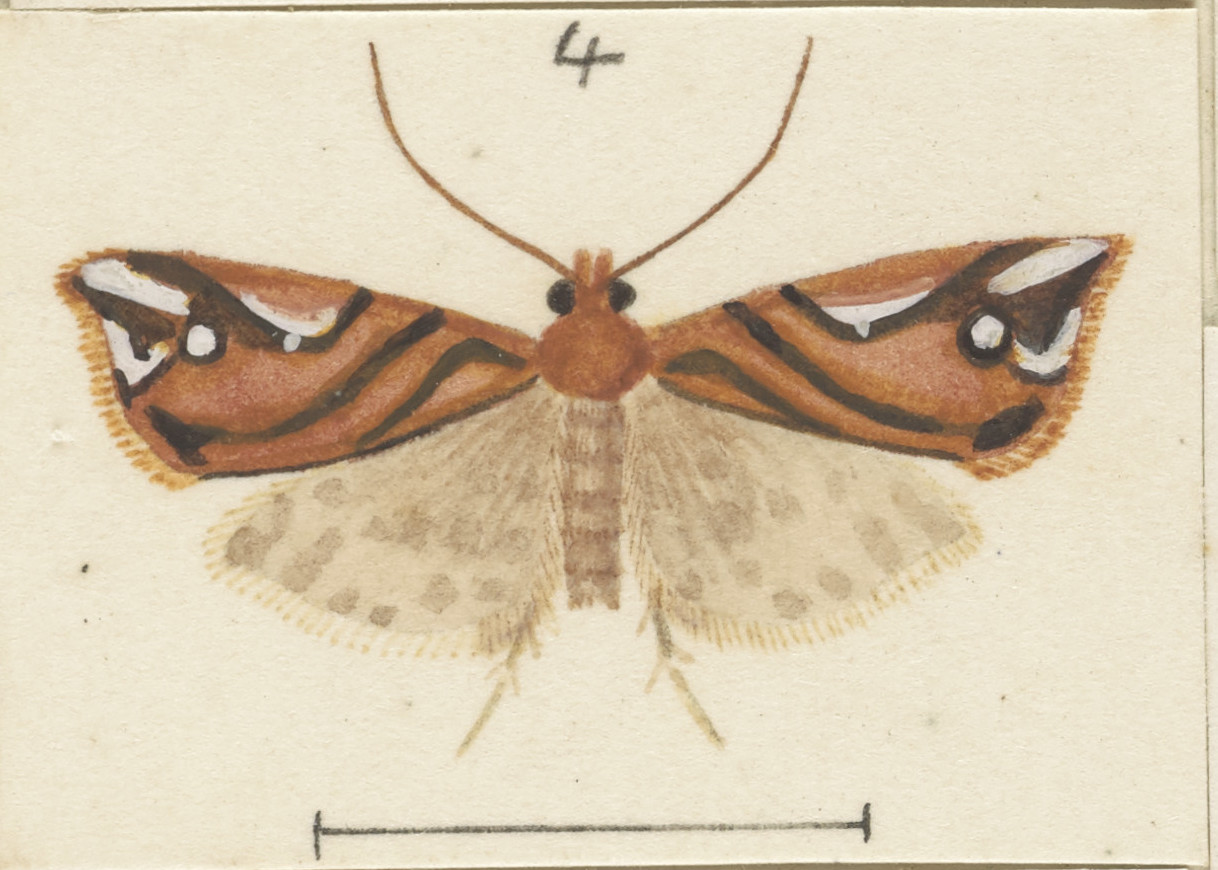
Illustration by George Hudson c. 1927

The adult of this species was described by Edward Meyrick as follows:

♂ 16mm. Head and palpi light reddish-ochreous. Antennae fuscous, ciliations 1. Thorax reddish-ochreous, with a curved dark fuscous mark above middle. Abdomen pale grey. Legs whitish, anterior pair and middle tibiae dark giey above. Forewings elongate - triangular, costa gently arched, apex rounded, hindmargin rather strongly sinuate, oblique; pale fuscous-reddish, irregularly spotted with ochreous; markings deep ochreous, partially mixed with black and ferruginous; a streak from base of costa to middle of inner margin; a second from 1/3 of costa to 3/4 of inner margin; a third from costa immediately beyond second, suddenly bent round above middle, and terminating on costa at 4/5, edged above from angle onwards by a snow-white streak attenuated posteriorly; a fourth from costa, immediately beyond termination of third, obliquely inwards to disc beyond middle, thence acutely angulated to middle of hindmargin, edged on apical side throughout by a clear white streak interrupted on each side of angle, included apical space ochreous, marked with black on hindmargin; two small leaden-grey spots between second and third streaks towards costa, and two others between third and fourth, lower of these larger; an ochreous streak along lower half of hindmargin, edged with black on margin : cilia ochreous, with a dark fuscous apical bar. Hindwings pale whitish-grey, suffusedly spotted with grey; cilia grey-whitish, round apex whitish-ochreous.

The wing markings of this species do not tend to vary. It is similar in appearance to its sister species Pyrgotis arcuata, however the forewings of R. arcuata specimens are even more patterned.

The larva of this species has been described by George Hudson as follows:

The larva, which feeds on rimu (Dacrydium cupressinum) is about inch in length; cylindrical, slightly tapering posteriorly; the head is yellowish-brown with two U-shaped dark marks on frons; segment 2 is horny, semitransparent, showing back portion of head through it; rest of body pale green with segmental divisions marked in paler green; a paler green lateral ridge; a subdorsal row of small warts, each wart emitting a fine bristle, the warts on the thoracic segments slightly larger; anal segment with dark green dorsal plate.

== Distribution ==
This species is endemic to New Zealand and is found throughout the country. It is regarded as being common.

== Behaviour ==
The larvae of this species lives underneath silken webs amongst the leaves of rimu trees. They pupate in a loose cocoons created from silk and frass amongst the leaves of its host tree. Adults are on the wing from October to May. They are night flying moths and are attracted to light. When resting the adult insect resembles a small dried fragment of rimu foliage.

== Habitat and host plant ==
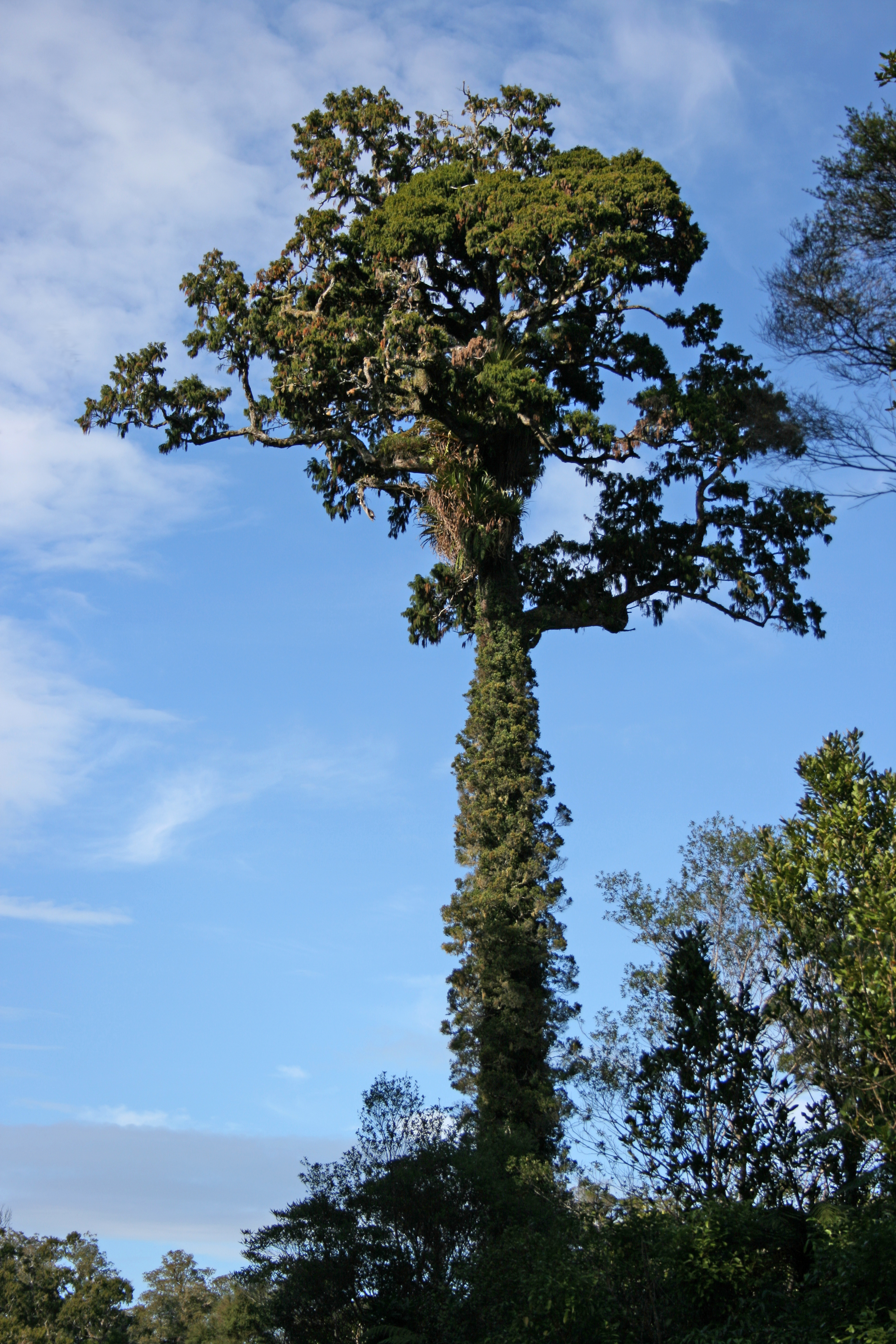
Rimu, the host species for the larvae of this moth.

This species inhabits native forests. The larvae of this species feeds on rimu.
