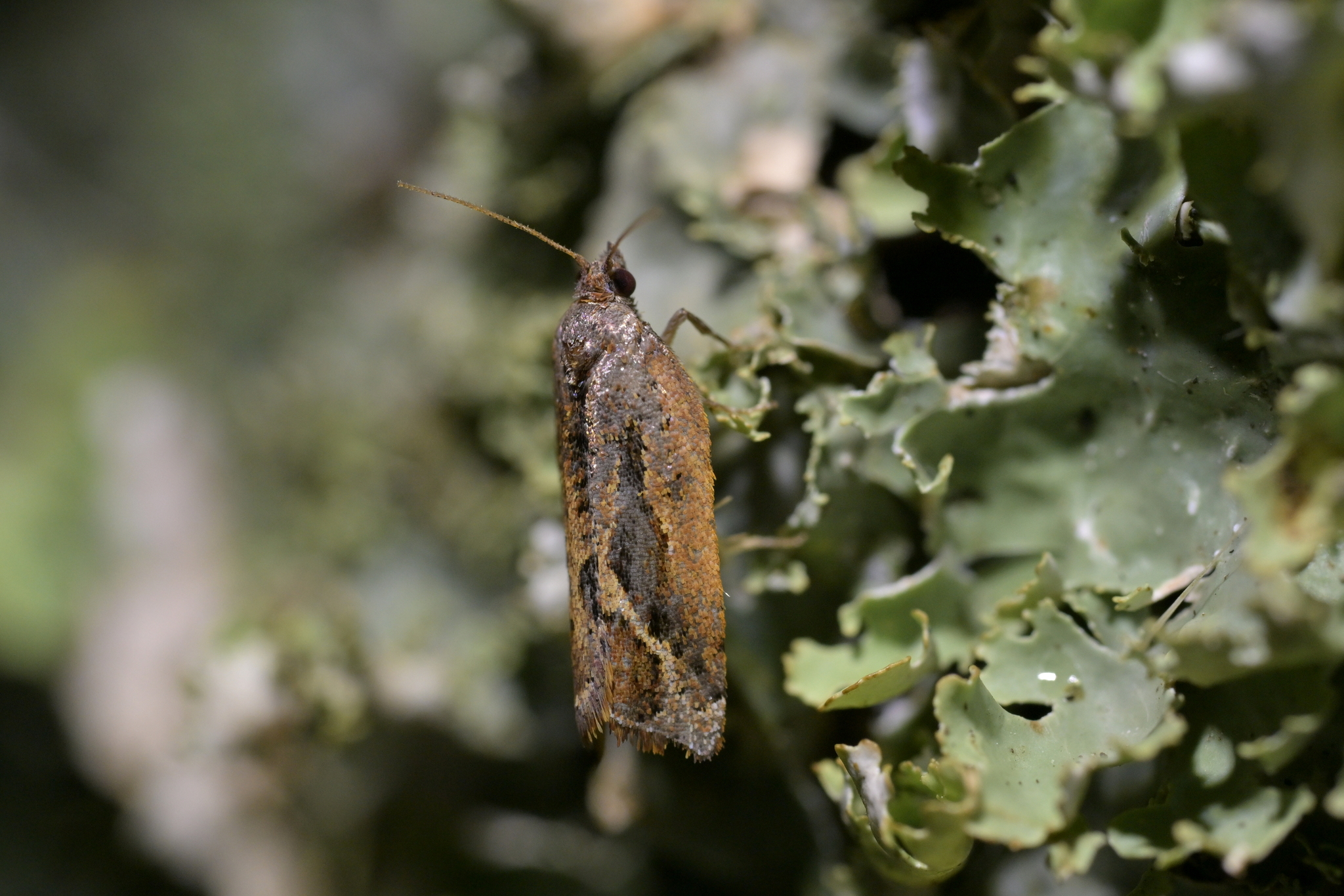

Scientific classification
- Kingdom: Animalia
- Phylum: Arthropoda
- Clade: Pancrustacea
- Class: Insecta
- Order: Lepidoptera
- Family: Tortricidae
- Genus: Pyrgotis
- Species: P. zygiana

Binomial name
- Pyrgotis zygiana Meyrick, 1882

Synonyms
- Capua zygiana (Meyrick, 1882)

= Pyrgotis zygiana =

Species of moth endemic to New Zealand

Pyrgotis zygiana is a species of moth of the family Tortricidae. This species was first described by Edward Meyrick in 1882. It is endemic to New Zealand and has been observed in both the North and South Islands. The larval host plant of this species is Prumnopitys taxifolia.

== Taxonomy ==
P. zygiana was first described by Edward Meyrick in 1882. In 1883 Meyrick provided a fuller description of the species. George Hudson discussed this species under the name Capua zygiana in his 1928 book The butterflies and moths of New Zealand. In 1971 John S. Dugdale confirmed the placement of this species in the genus Pyrgotis. The male holotype specimen, collected at Riccarton Bush by Meyrick, is held at the Natural History Museum, London.

== Description ==
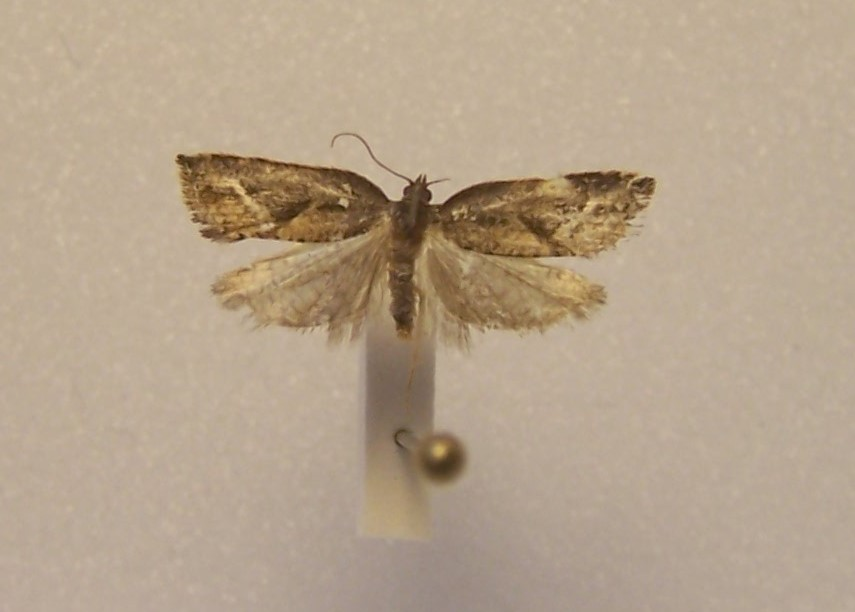
P. zygiana specimen.

The wingspan is about 14 mm. The forewings are dark reddish ochreous fuscous, mixed with dark fuscous and strigulated (finely streaked) with leaden grey. The hindwings are grey.

Meyrick described this species as follows:

Male, 14 mm.—Head, palpi, and thorax reddish-fuscous mixed with dark fuscous. Antenne grey, annulated with blackish. Abdomen grey. Legs grey-whitish, anterior and middle tibiee and tarsi and apical joints of posterior tarsi suffused with dark fuscous, except at apex of joints. Forewings moderate, posteriorly dilated, costa moderately arched, hindmargin sinuate, oblique; rather dark reddish-ochreous-fuscous, mixed with dark fuscous, and coarsely strigulated throughout with leaden-grey; costa and inner margin shortly strigulated with blackish ; an indistinct blackish suffusion in disc near base, and another in disc towards apex; an indistinct slender streak of grey-whitish scales from near inner margin before anal angle to apex, where it is suffusedly dilated: cilia reddish-fuscous mixed with dark fuscous. Hindwings grey; cilia whitish-grey, with two indistinct darker lines.

== Distribution ==
This species is endemic to New Zealand. As well as the type locality in Canterbury this species has also been recorded in Titirangi and in other locations throughout the North Island.

== Host species ==
The larvae feed exclusively on Prumnopitys taxifolia.
