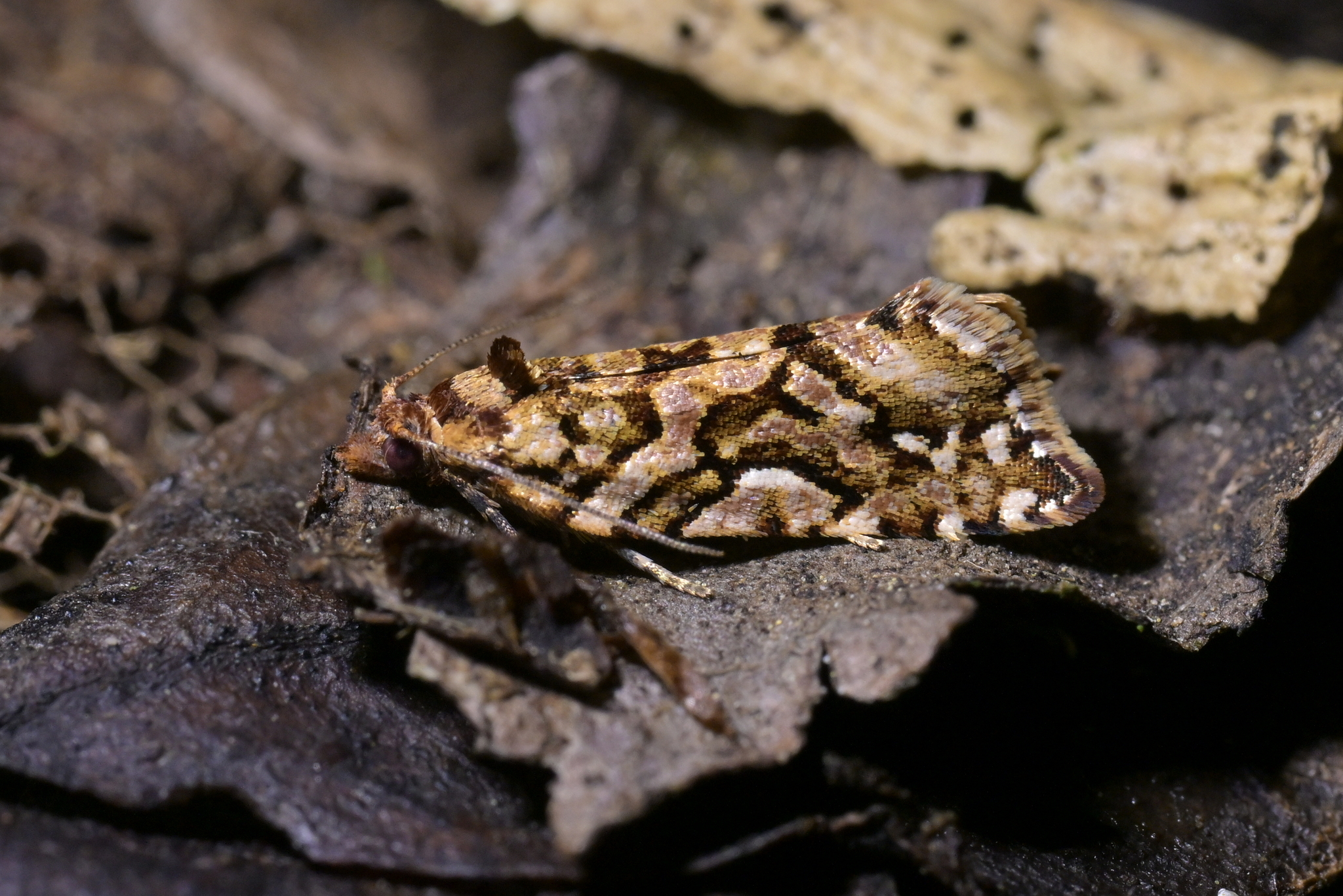

Scientific classification
- Kingdom: Animalia
- Phylum: Arthropoda
- Clade: Pancrustacea
- Class: Insecta
- Order: Lepidoptera
- Family: Tortricidae
- Genus: Pyrgotis
- Species: P. arcuata

Binomial name
- Pyrgotis arcuata (Philpott, 1915)

Synonyms
- Capua arcuata Philpott, 1915

= Pyrgotis arcuata =

Species of moth endemic to New Zealand

Pyrgotis arcuata is a species of moth of the family Tortricidae. This species was first described by Alfred Philpott in 1915. It is endemic to New Zealand. It has been observed in both the North and South Islands. P. arcuata inhabits lowland forests with adults being on the wing from October until May. Larvae feed on Dacrycarpus dacrydioides.

== Taxonomy ==
This species was first described by Alfred Philpott in 1915 and originally named Capua arcuata. George Hudson discussed and illustrated this species under this name in his 1928 book The butterflies and moths of New Zealand. In 1971 John S. Dugdale placed this species in the genus Pyrgotis. The male holotype specimen collected by Philpott in Invercargill is held in the New Zealand Arthropod Collection.

== Description ==
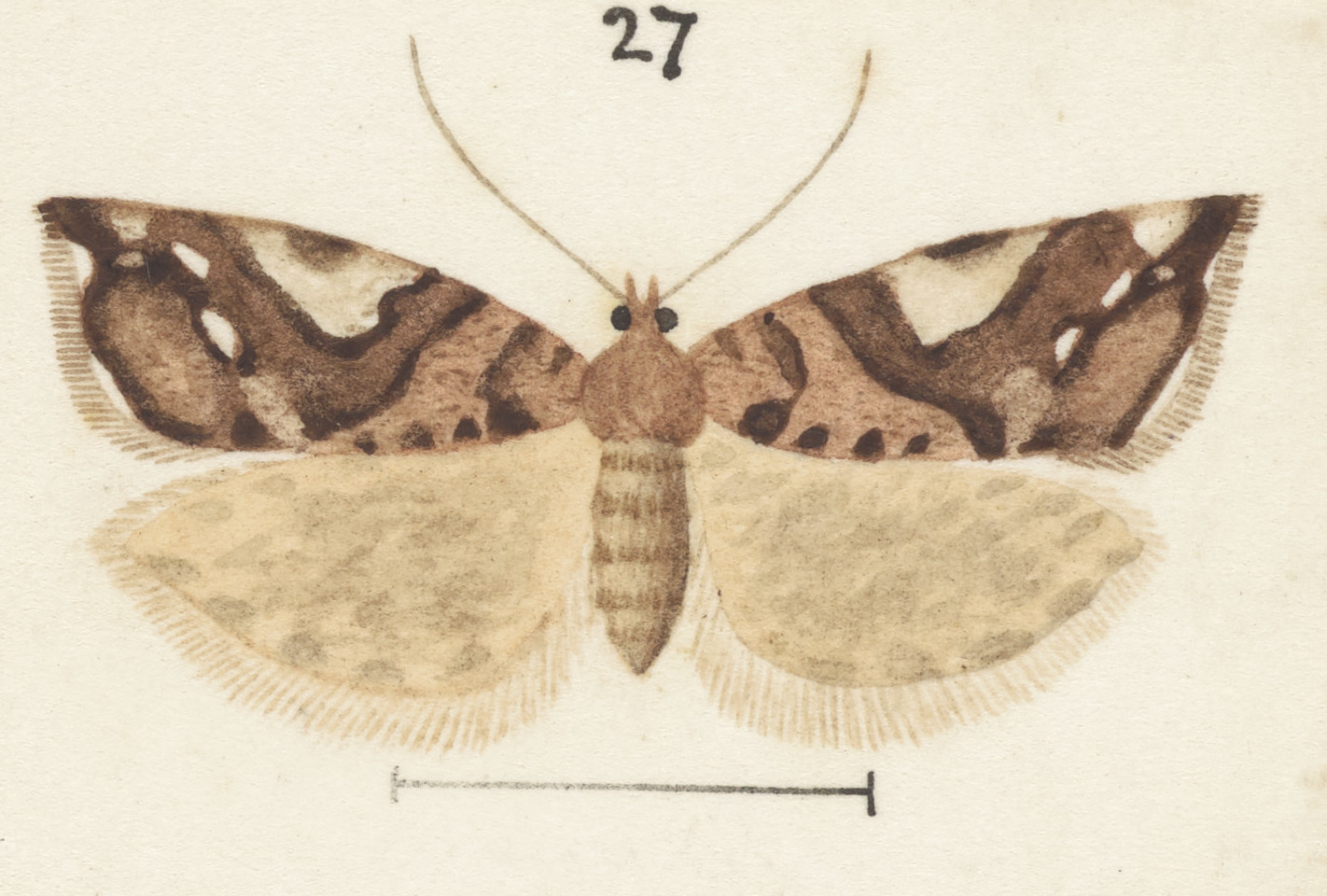
Illustration by Hudson.

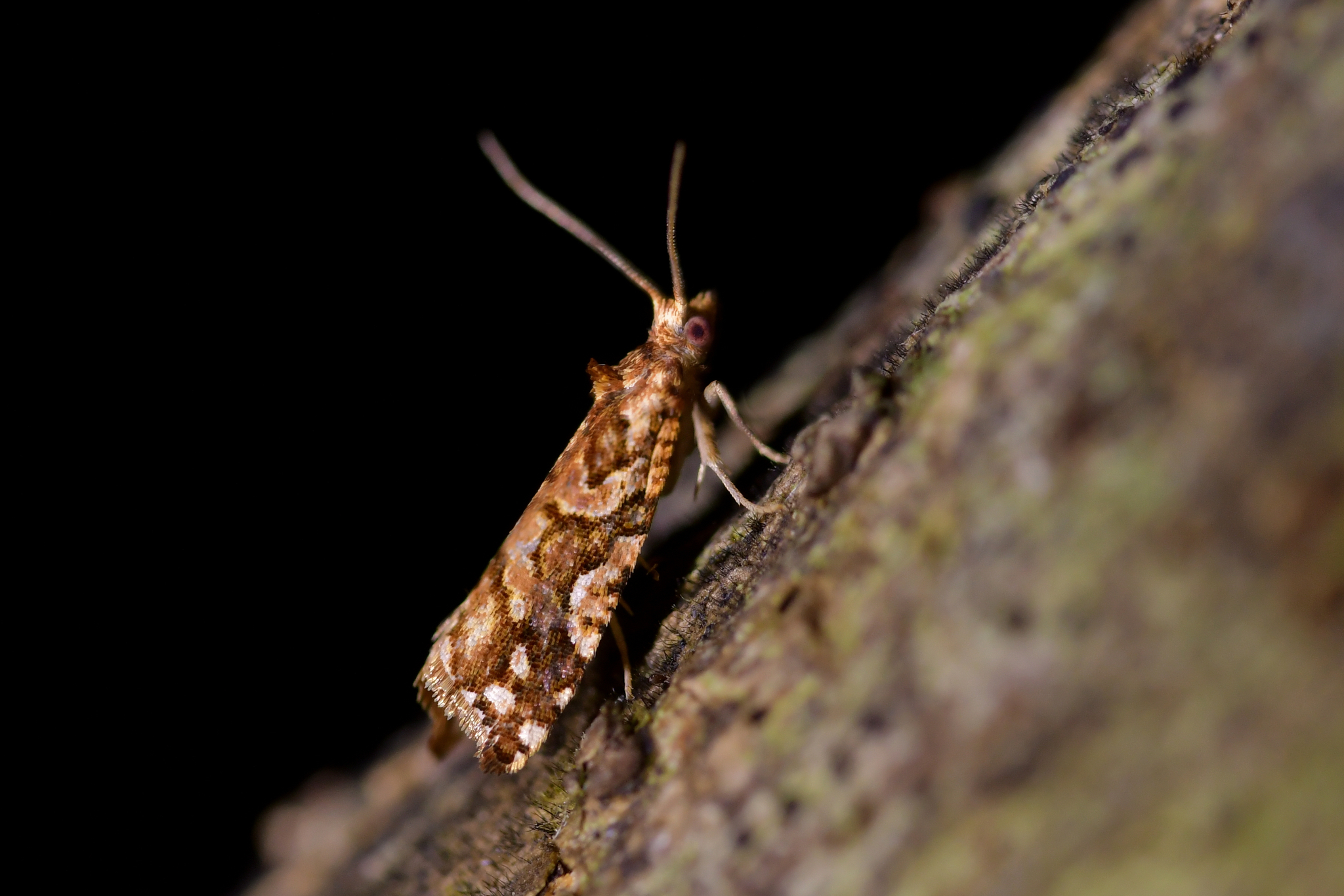
P. arcuata near Wainuiamata.

Philpott first described this species as follows:

♀. 15-16 mm. Head, palpi, antennae, and thorax ochreous-whitish sprinkled with reddish. Abdomen ochreous-grey. Forewings oblong, termen sinuate, dorsum straight ; whitish, irregularly mixed with pale ochreous ; fasciae reddish-ochreous, becoming blackish on margins ; basal patch indicated by obscure irregular fascia, almost obsolete on costa and dorsum ; median fascia broad, from costa at 1/3 outwardly oblique to below middle, thence bent upwards again to costa at 1/3 enclosing semi-oval area much mixed with white; one or two costal blotches of reddish-black- within this enclosed area ; a broad fascia from tornus, parallel to termen and touching median fascia at apex ; a narrow white interrupted space between these fasciae ; two or three irregular white blotches on costa near apex and a series of obscure dark strigulae along dorsum : cilia white mixed with reddish-brown. Hindwings whitish-grey, suffused and spotted with pale fuscous : cilia greyish-white with a darker basal line.

This species is similar in appearance to a dull specimen of Pyrgotis plinthoglypta. However P. arcuata differs considerably in the detailed markings.

== Distribution ==
This species is endemic to New Zealand and is found in both the North and South Islands.

== Behaviour ==
Adults of this species are on the wing from October until May.

== Habitat and host species ==
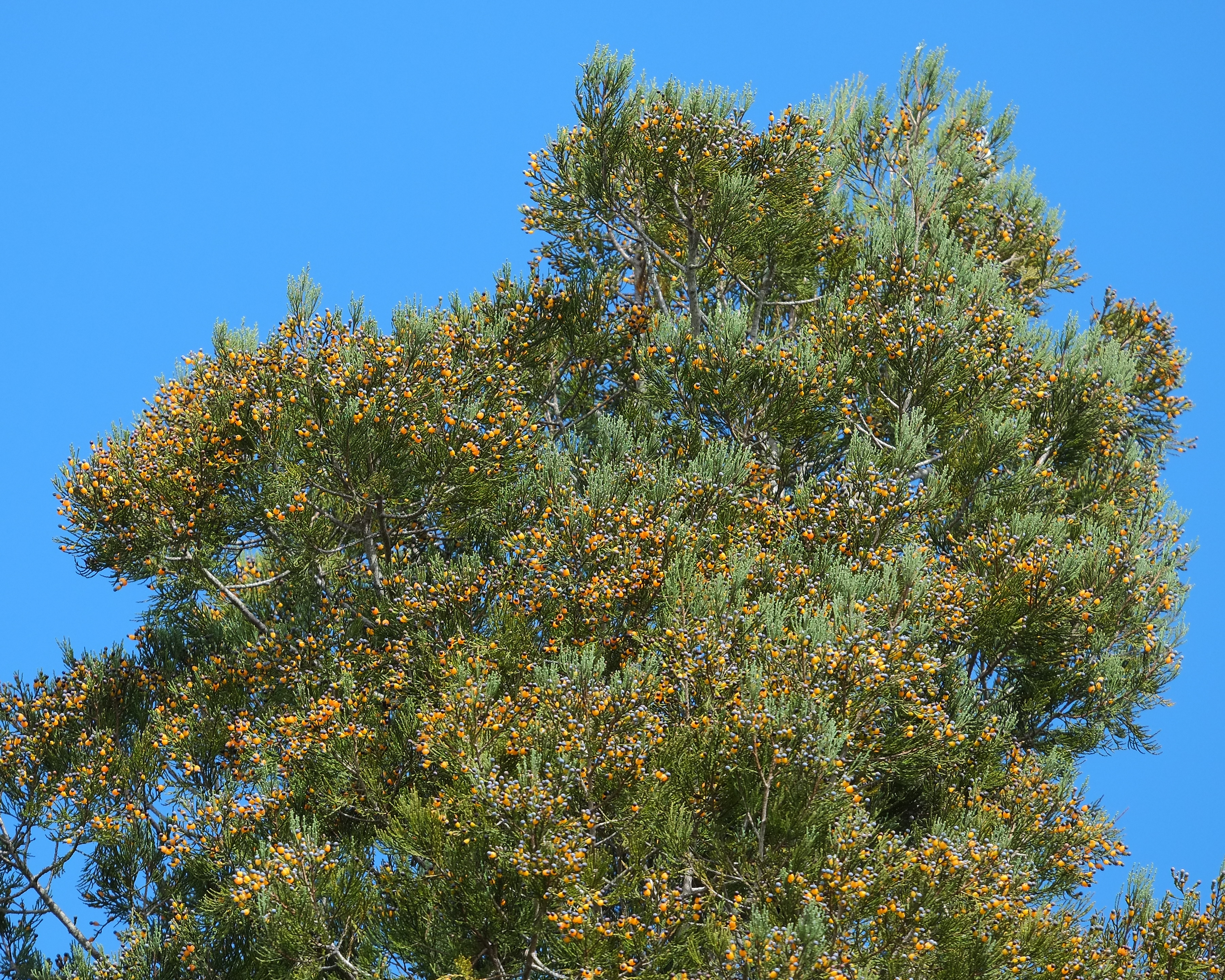
Top of D. dacrydioides, the larval host species.

P. arcuata inhabit lowland forests. The larvae feed on Dacrycarpus dacrydioides.
