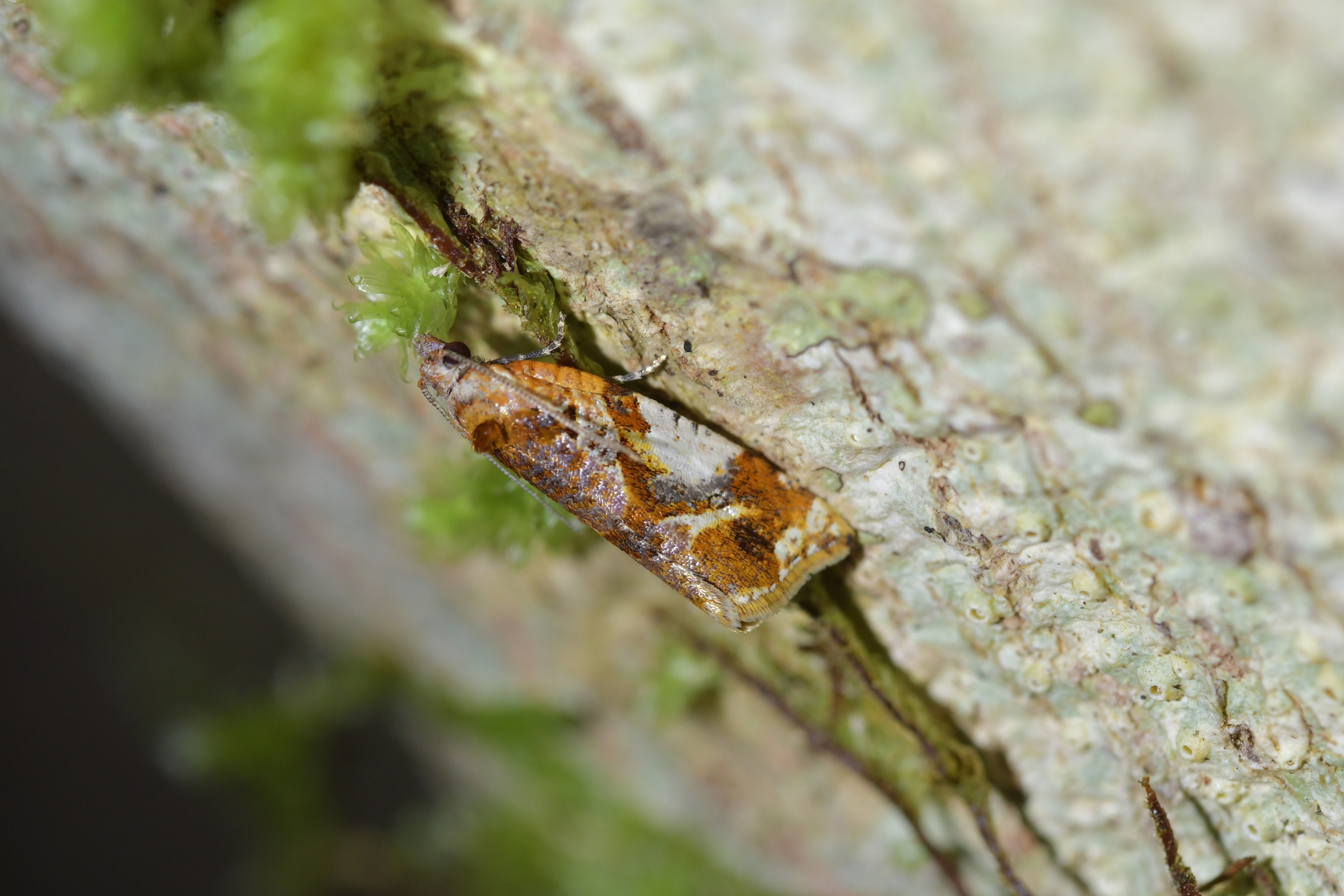

Scientific classification
- Kingdom: Animalia
- Phylum: Arthropoda
- Clade: Pancrustacea
- Class: Insecta
- Order: Lepidoptera
- Family: Tortricidae
- Genus: Pyrgotis
- Species: P. plagiatana

Binomial name
- Pyrgotis plagiatana (Walker, 1863)

Synonyms
- Conchylis plagiatana Walker, 1863; Capua plagiatana (Walker, 1863); Conchylis recusana Walker, 1863; Paedisca luciplagana Walker, 1863; Grapholitha punana Felder & Rogenhofer, 1875; Grapholitha xylinana Felder & Rogenhofer, 1875; Adoxophyes trichroa Meyrick, 1901; Catamacta trichroa (Meyrick, 1901); Pyrgotis tornota Meyrick, 1907; Epagoge parallela Salmon & Bradley, 1956

= Pyrgotis plagiatana =

Species of moth endemic to New Zealand

Pyrgotis plagiatana is a species of moth of the family Tortricidae. This species was first described by Francis Walker in 1863. It is endemic to New Zealand and has been observed in the North, South and Stewart Islands, Big South Cape, Auckland and Campbell Islands and possibly in the Snares. This species inhabits native scrub and forest in coastal to subalpine habitats. Larvae are hosted by a wide variety of plants and feed from a shelter formed from a loose gallery of silk placed between host plant leaves. The larvae pupate within this shelter. The adult moth is extremely variable in appearance and is most commonly observed on the wing from September until June.

== Taxonomy ==
This species was first described by Francis Walker in 1863 and originally named Conchylis plagiatana. Walker, in the same publication, thinking he was describing new species, also named this species Conchylis recusana and Paedisca luciplagana. In 1875 Cajetan von Felder and Alois Friedrich Rogenhofer, also thinking they were describing new species, named this species Grapholitha punana and Grapholitha xylinana. All these names were synonymised by Edward Meyrick in 1881. In 1901 Meyrick, again believing he was describing a new species, named this species Adoxophyes trichroa. This name was synonymised by John S. Dugdale in 1971. Meyrick made the same error in 1907 naming the species Pyrgotis tornota. He corrected this error and synonymised this name in 1914. George Hudson discussed and illustrated this species under the name Capua plagiatana in his 1928 book The butterflies and moths of New Zealand. In 1956 John Tenison Salmon and John David Bradley, again thinking they were describing a new species, named this moth Epagoge parallela. This name was synonymised by Dugdale in 1971. In that publication Dugdale redescribed this species and confirmed its placement in the genus Pyrgotis. The male holotype specimen, collected in Nelson by T. R. Oxley, is held in the Natural History Museum, London.

== Description ==
Hudson described the larva of this moth as:

... moderately stout, cylindrical, slightly tapering at each end; pale whitish-grey-greenish, becoming darker smoky grey on the back; the head and plate of the second segment, when young is black, when full-grown greenish-ochreous.

The pupa is enclosed in a thin silken cocoon placed in the joined leaves of its larval host.

The wingspan of the adults of this moth is about 18 mm. Hudson described the species as follows:

The forewings are triangular with the apex acuile and the termen rather curved and oblique; creamy-white with bright yellowish-brown or pinkish-brown markings variable in intensity; there is a faint basal shading; a short dark brown mark on the dorsum; a conspicuous dark band from 1/3 of costa to 2/3 of dorsum meeting another band from 3/4 of costa to 2/3 of dorsum, the two forming a V-shaped marking and enclosing a more or less triangular whitish area, often very conspicuous; a large oval patch above the tornus; the cilia are the same colour as the dark markings. The hind-wings are white, sometimes tinged with ochreous at the tip, and more or less dappled with grey; the cilia are white.

Hudson pointed out that this is a very variable species, differing in the intensity of colouring and markings. Hudson illustrated many of the variations of this species. Dugdale explained that the more exposed the locality inhabited by this species, the greater the tendency for the wings of this moth to become narrower in relation to body length.

== Distribution ==
P. plagiatana is endemic to New Zealand and has been observed in the North, South and Stewart Islands, Big South Cape, Auckland and Campbell Islands and possibly in the Snares.

== Behaviour ==
Larvae form a shelter consisting of a loose gallery of silk between host plant leaves and proceed to gnaw numerous holes in host plant leaves. Larvae are most common in April although Hudson stated he had bred a female in June. Adults are most commonly observed on the wing during the months of September until June but can be observed all year round. Adults are nocturnal and are attracted to light. When at rest the adult holds its wings in a wedge shape.

== Habitat and host species ==
This species is found in coastal to subalpine habitats and adults frequents openings in native scrub or forest. On the mainland this species is absent at altitudes above the forest edge.

The larvae are polyphagous and are arboreal in nature. Larval hosts include Carmichaelia species, Coriaria arborea, Fuchsia excorticata, Veronica elliptica, Veronica stricta, Veronica subalpina, Melicope simplex, Metrosideros species, Ozothamnus leptophyllus, Pittosporum tenuifolium, Tupeia antarctica, Pinus radiata and Ulex europaeus.

== Illustrations of differing forms of the species ==
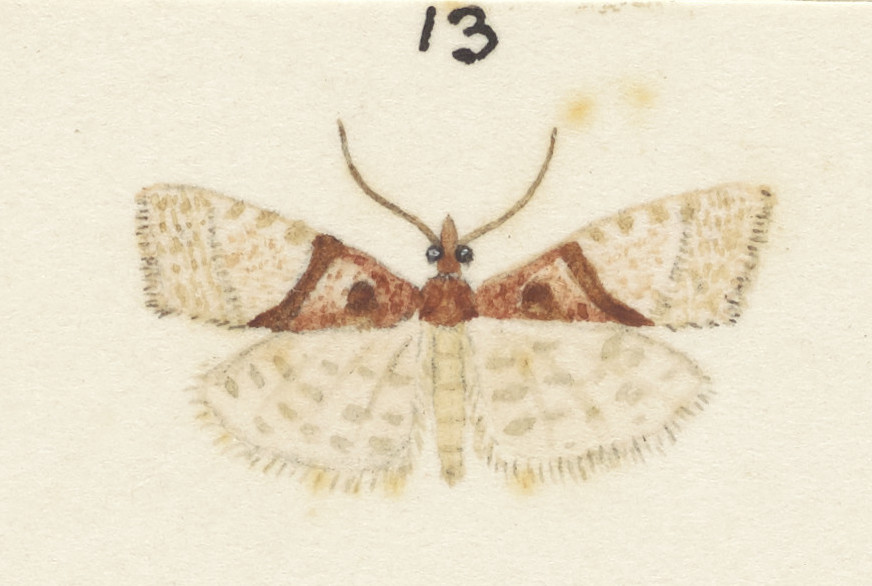

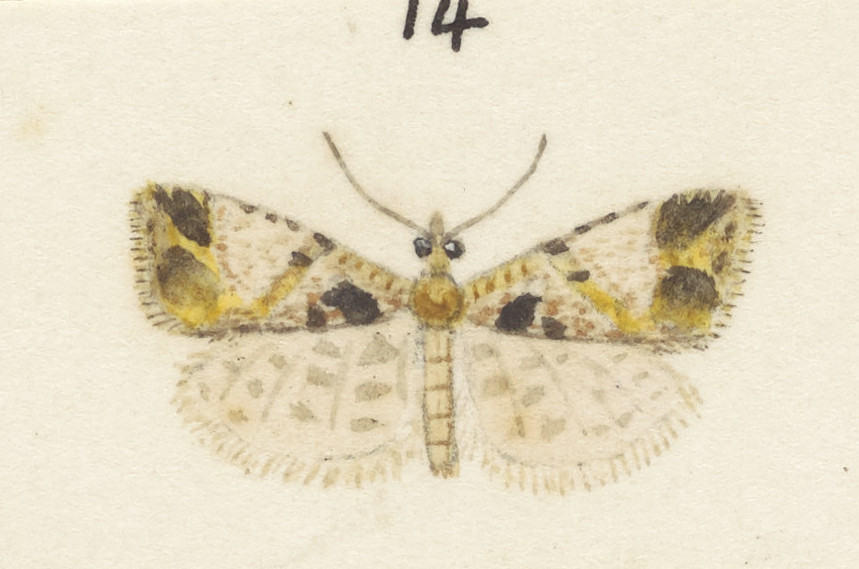

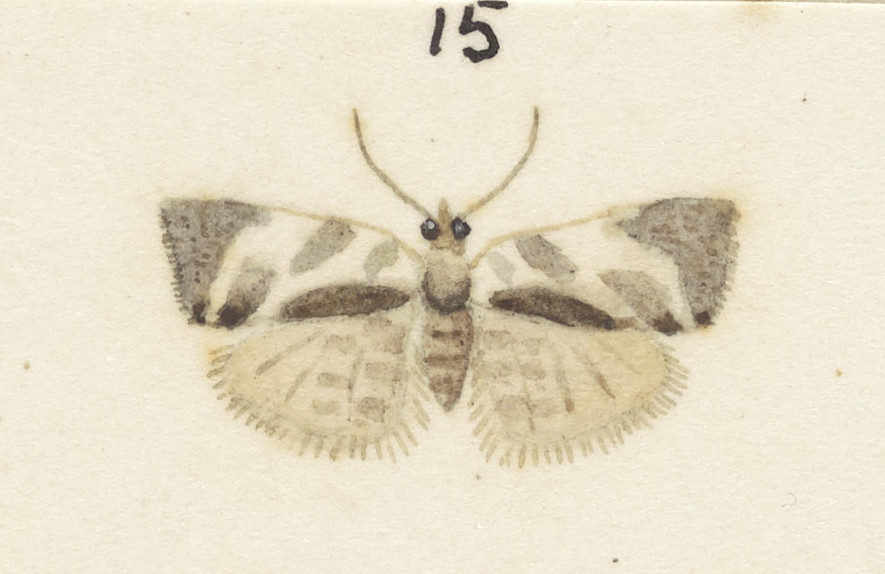

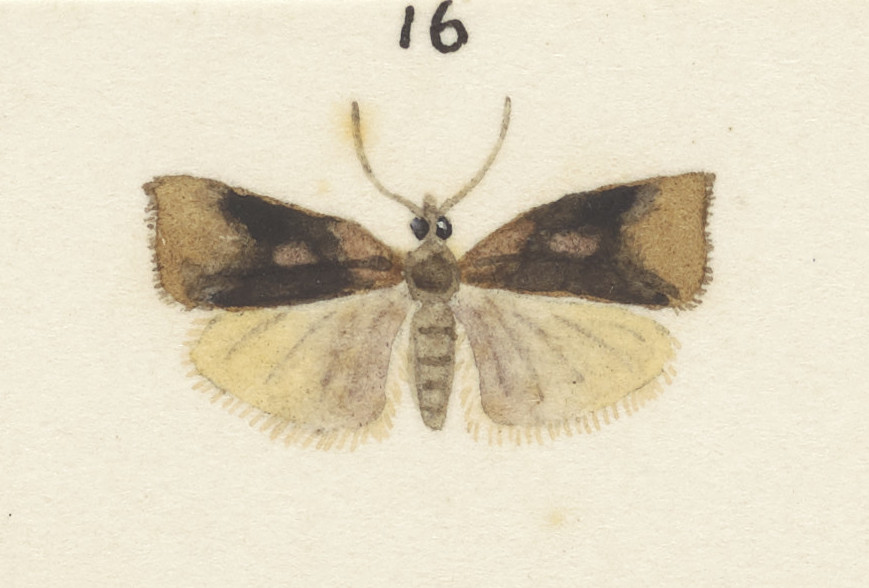

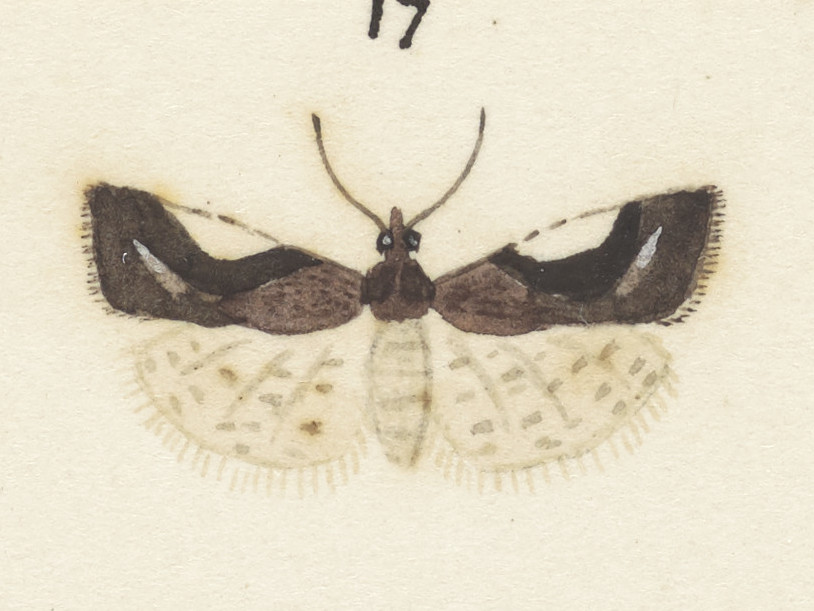

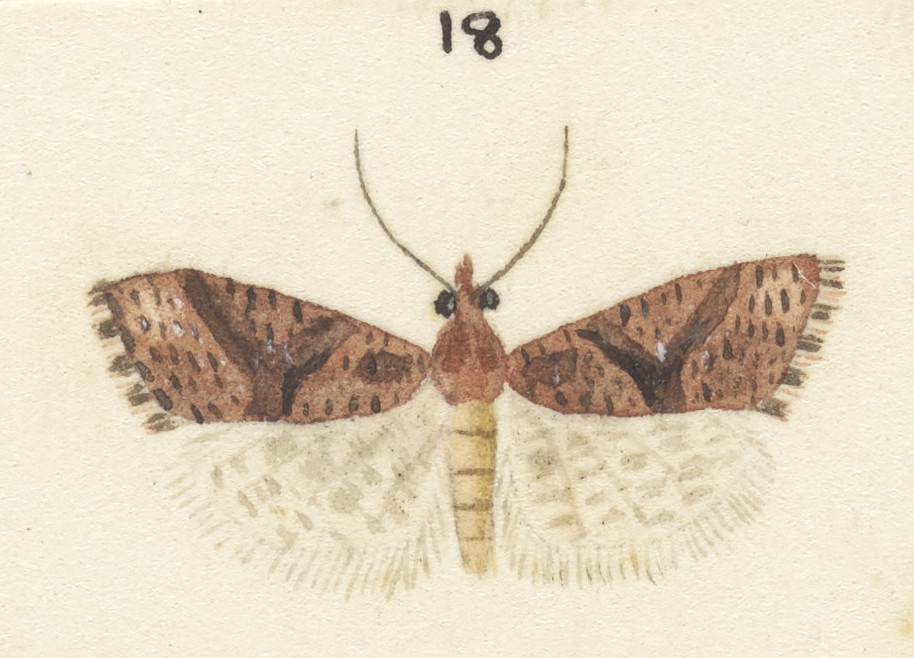

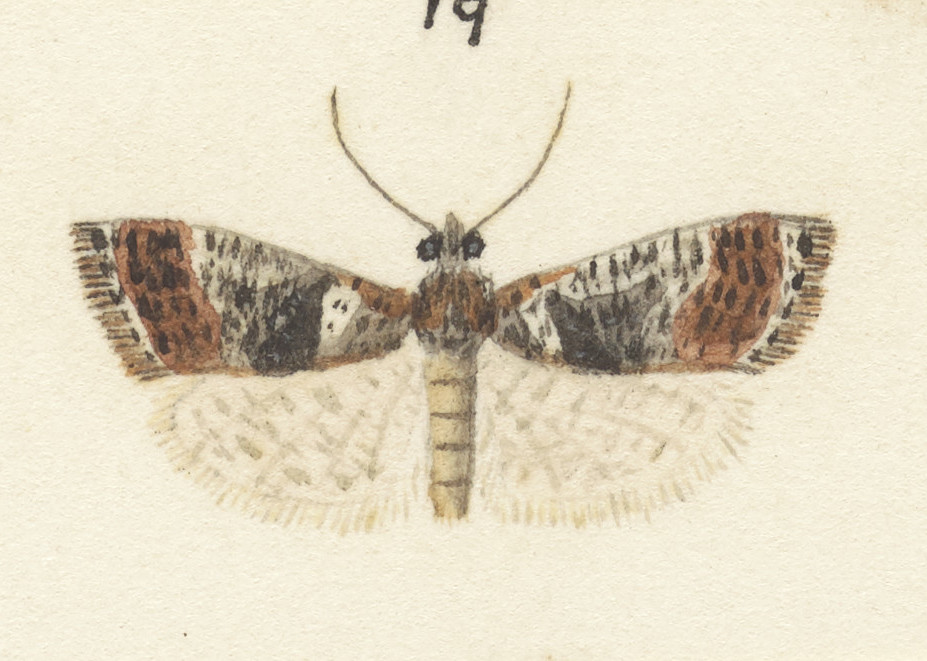

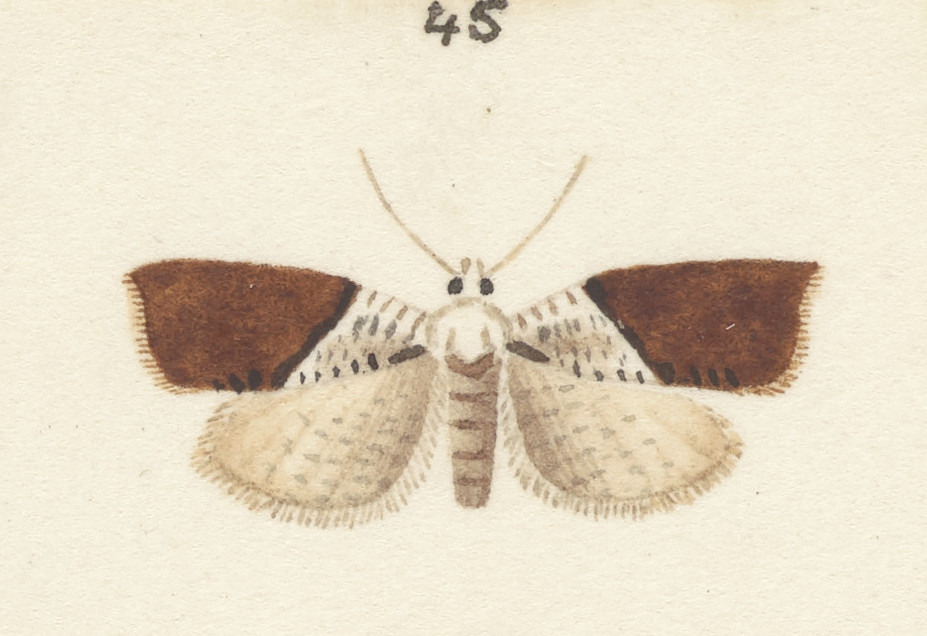
