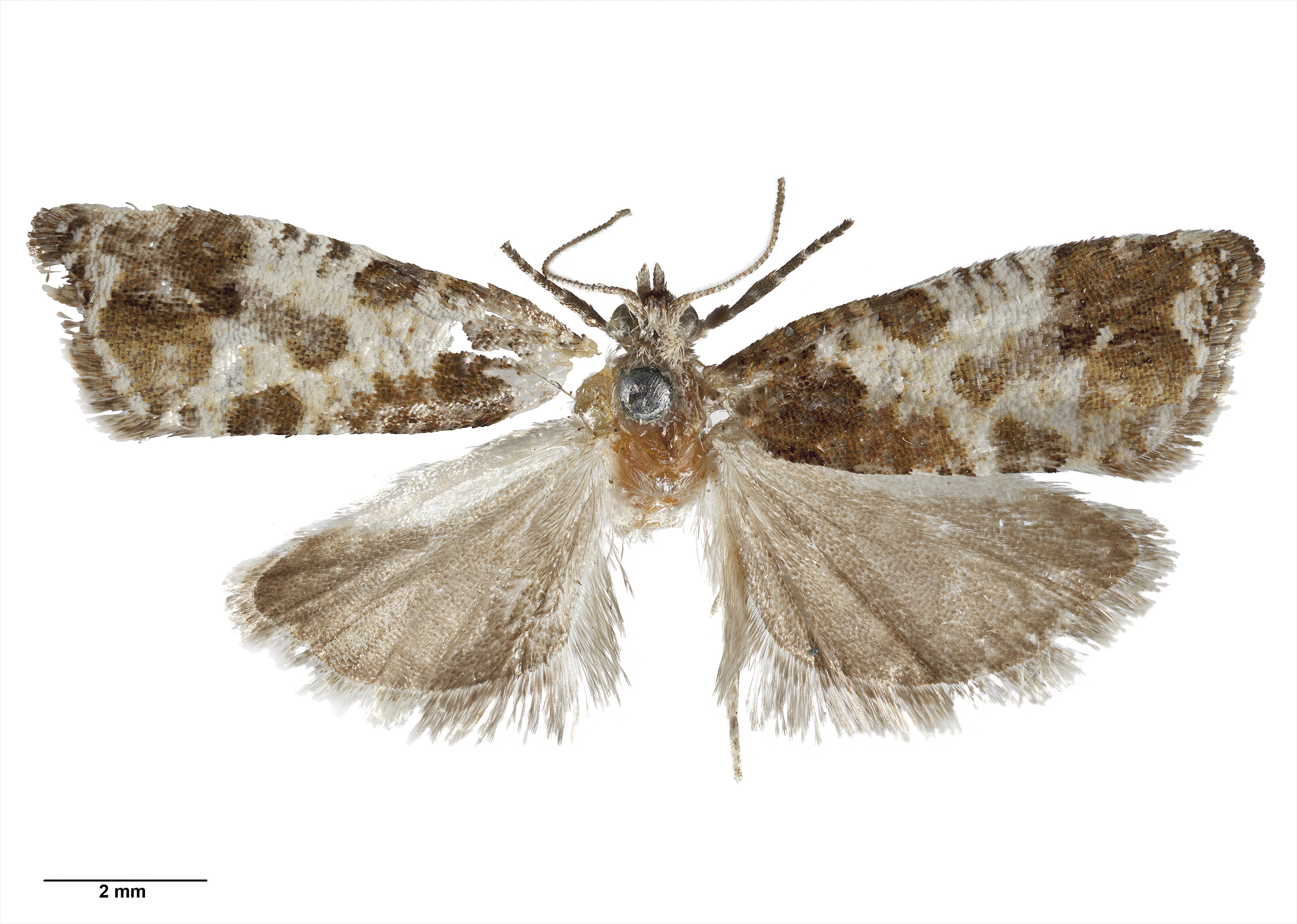
- Pyrgotis calligypsa

Scientific classification
- Kingdom: Animalia
- Phylum: Arthropoda
- Clade: Pancrustacea
- Class: Insecta
- Order: Lepidoptera
- Family: Tortricidae
- Tribe: Archipini
- Genus: Pyrgotis; Meyrick, 1881

= Pyrgotis =

Genus of tortrix moths

Pyrgotis is a genus of moths belonging to the subfamily Tortricinae of the family Tortricidae. This genus was first described by Edward Meyrick in 1881. In 1971 John S. Dugdale redescribed this genus. The type species of this genus is Conchylis plagiatan Walker, 1863, by subsequent designation. All species in this genus, apart from Pyrgotis siderantha which is found in Sri Lanka, are endemic to New Zealand. There are two undescribed species the specimens of which are held at the New Zealand Arthropod Collection.

== Species ==
- Pyrgotis arcuata (Philpott, 1915)
- Pyrgotis calligypsa (Meyrick, 1926)
- Pyrgotis chrysomela (Meyrick, 1914)
- Pyrgotis consentiens Philpott, 1916
- Pyrgotis eudorana Meyrick, 1885
- Pyrgotis humilis Philpott, 1930
- Pyrgotis plagiatana (Walker, 1863)
- Pyrgotis plinthoglypta Meyrick, 1892
- Pyrgotis pyramidias Meyrick, 1901
- Pyrgotis siderantha (Meyrick, 1905)
- Pyrgotis transfixa (Meyrick, 1924)
- Pyrgotis zygiana Meyrick, 1882

== See also ==
- List of Tortricidae genera
