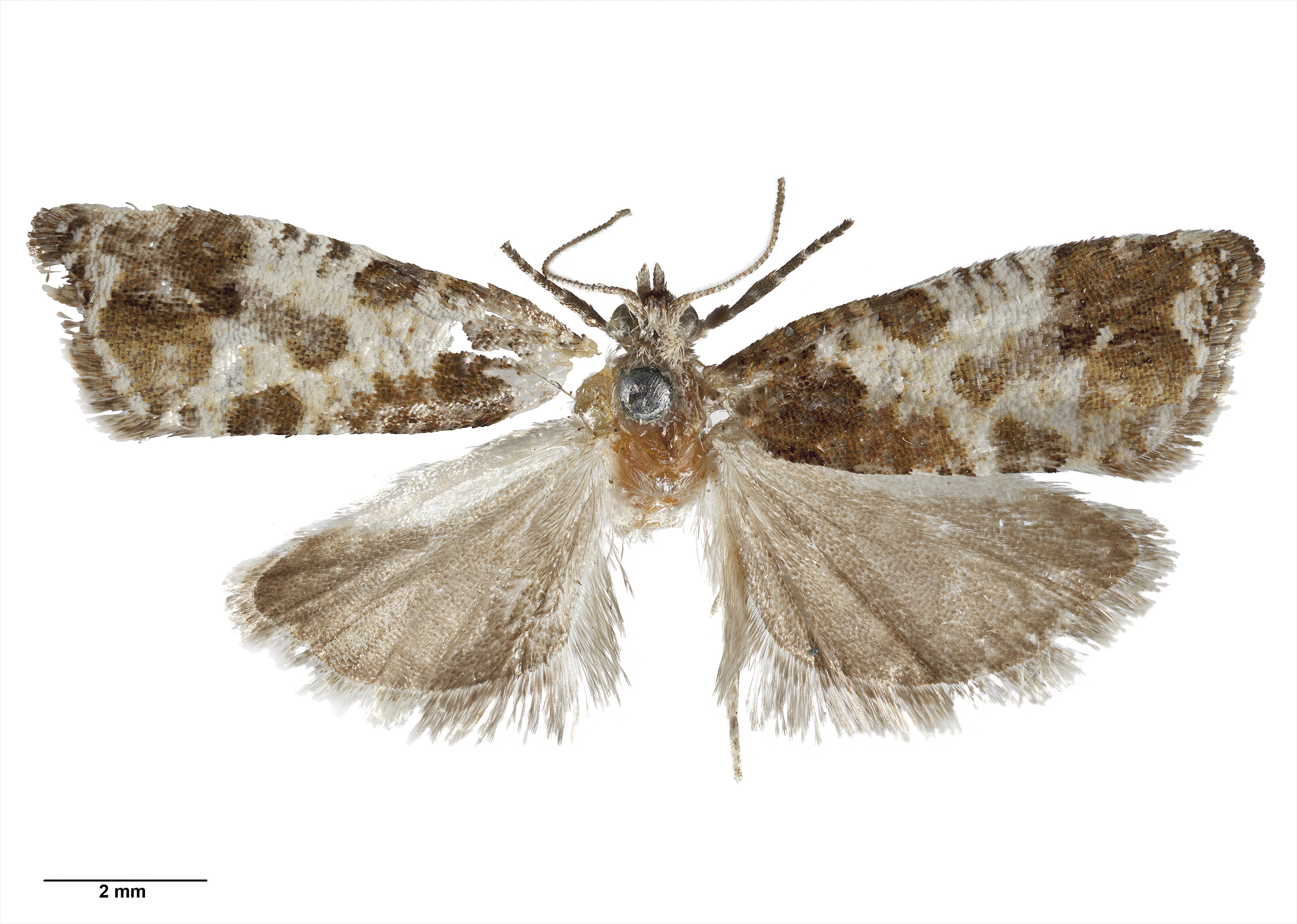
- Male holotype

Scientific classification
- Kingdom: Animalia
- Phylum: Arthropoda
- Clade: Pancrustacea
- Class: Insecta
- Order: Lepidoptera
- Family: Tortricidae
- Genus: Pyrgotis
- Species: P. calligypsa

Binomial name
- Pyrgotis calligypsa (Meyrick, 1926)

Synonyms
- Catamacta calligypsa Meyrick, 1926; Capua variegata Philpott, 1930

= Pyrgotis calligypsa =

Species of moth endemic to New Zealand

Pyrgotis calligypsa is a species of moth of the family Tortricidae. This species was first described by Edward Meyrick in 1926. It is endemic to New Zealand and has been observed in the North Island. This species inhabits native forest. Adults are on the wing most commonly in the months of September until February. The larvae of this species feed on species in the genus Kunzea as well as Leptospermum scoparium and Pennantia corymbosa.

== Taxonomy ==
This species was first described by Edward Meyrick in 1926 and originally named Catamacta calligypsa. George Hudson discussed and illustrated this species under this name in his 1928 book The butterflies and moths of New Zealand. In 1930, thinking he was describing a new species, Alfred Philpott named this species Capua variegata. In 1971 John S. Dugdale placed this species in the genus Pyrgotis. In 1988 Dugdale synonymised C. variegata with P. calligypsa. The holotype specimen, collected by Hudson in Wellington, is held at the Natural History Museum, London.

== Description ==
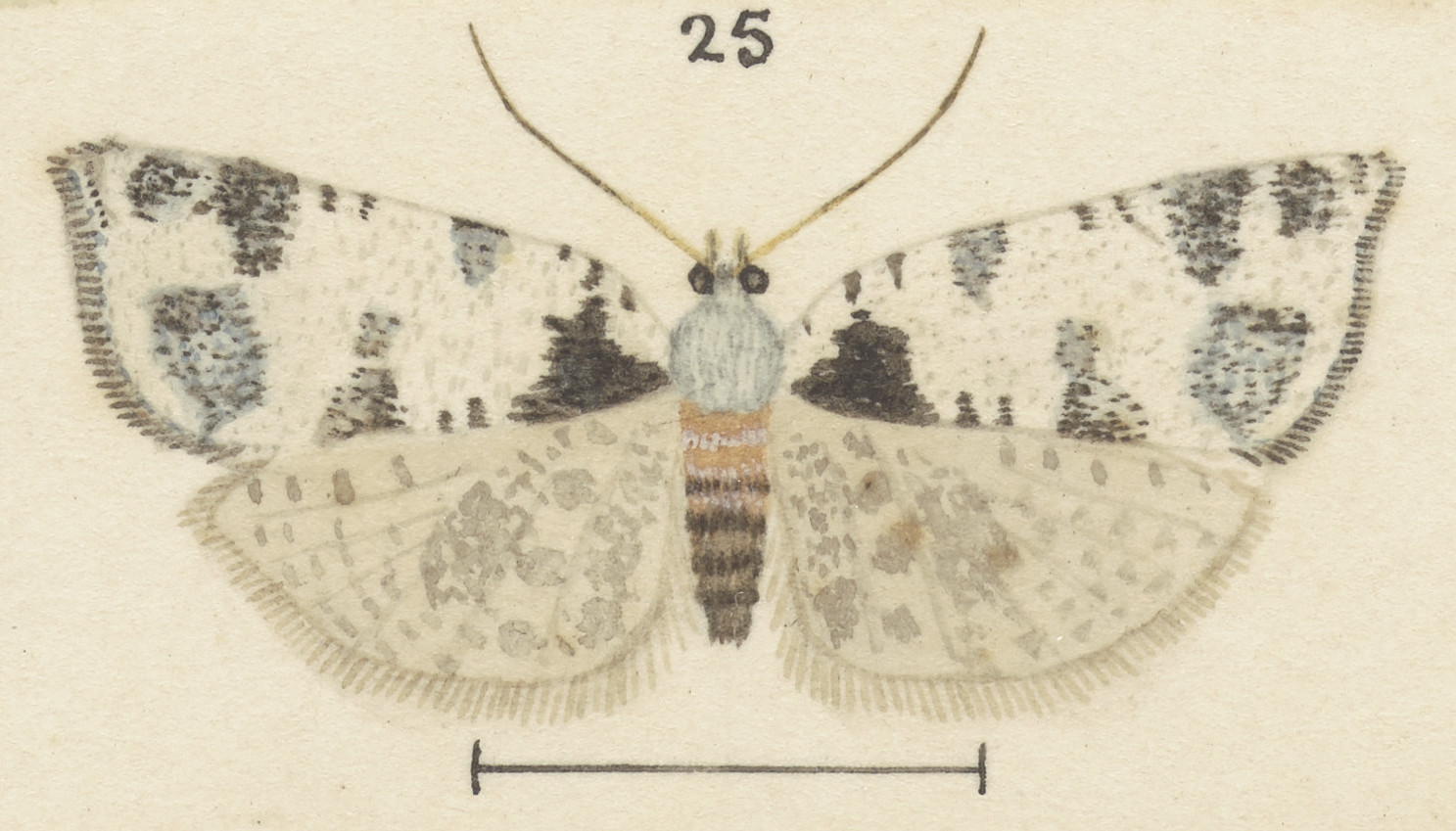
Illustration by George Hudson.

Meyrick described this species as follows:

♀ 16 mm. Head and thorax white, slightly speckled grey. Palpi 2, whitish, sprinkled dark grey. Forewings suboblong, slightly dilated posteriorly, costa strongly arched towards base, then faintly sinuate, apex obtuse, termen slightly sinuate, somewhat oblique; white; basal patch grey with some strigulae of blackish irroration, suffused white towards costa, edge running from ⅕ of costa to ⅖ of dorsum, slightly irregular, central fascia represented by a faint greyish spot on costa at ⅖, a grey spot on dorsum beyond middle, and a faint greyish cloud above this; on costa posteriorly an oblong blotch of grey suffusion with some dots of blackish irroration, enclosing a small white spot on costa; an irregular transverse blotch of grey suffusion extending from tornus before termen to above middle; two or three scattered blackish dots on costa; three blackish strigulae on apical part of termen: cilia white, extreme base grey, a strong rather dark grey median shade. Hindwings whitish, with small scattered light-grey spots or strigulae; cilia whitish.

== Distribution ==
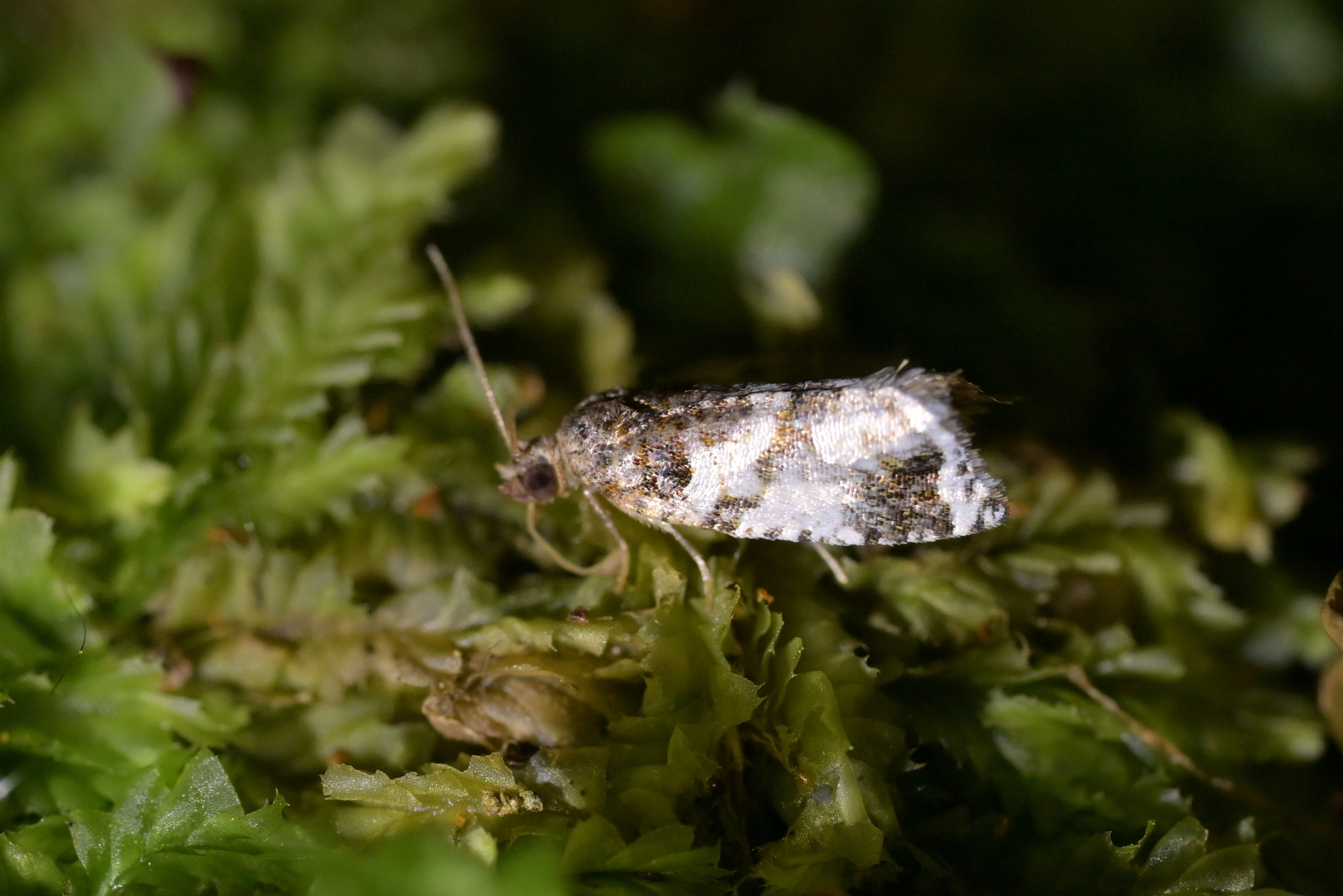
P. calligypsa near Whangārei.

This species is endemic to New Zealand and has been observed in the North Island.

== Behaviour ==
Adults of this species have been observed on the wing most commonly in the months of September until February.

== Habitat and hosts ==
This species inhabits native forest. The larvae of this species feed on Kunzea species as well as Leptospermum scoparium and Pennantia corymbosa.
