= Pyrgotis siderantha =

Scientific classification
- Kingdom: Animalia
- Phylum: Arthropoda
- Class: Insecta
- Order: Lepidoptera
- Family: Tortricidae
- Genus: Pyrgotis
- Species: P. siderantha

Binomial name
- Pyrgotis siderantha (Meyrick, 1905)

Synonyms
- Epagoge siderantha Meyrick, 1905

Species of moth

Pyrgotis siderantha is a species of moth of the family Tortricidae. It is found in Sri Lanka.

The wingspan is 12–14 mm. The forewings are ferruginous brown with various scattered small shining bluish-leaden-metallic spots. The hindwings are yellow whitish.
