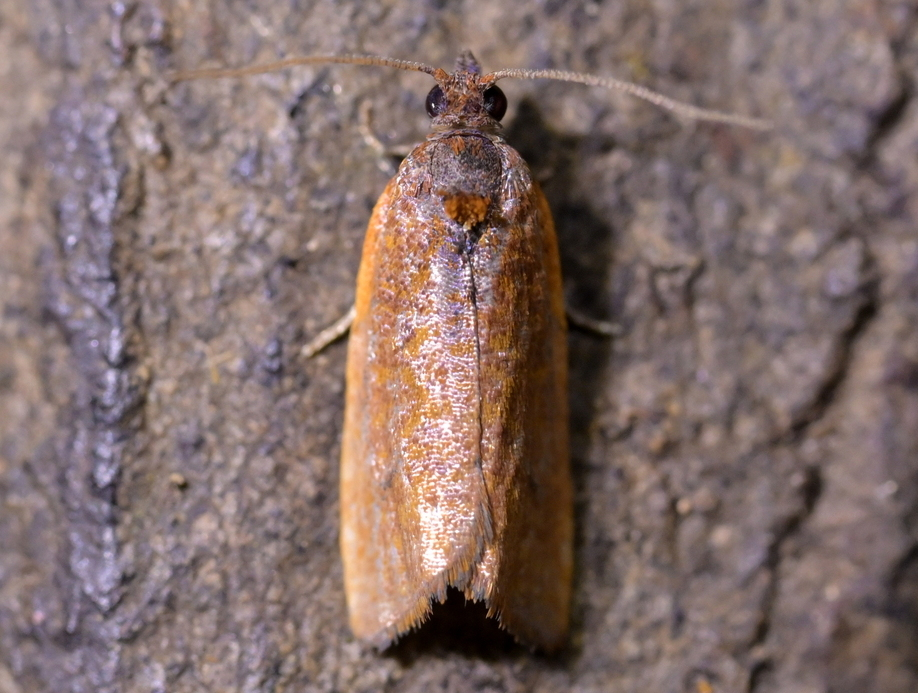
- Pyrgotis chrysomela seen at Ōtari-Wilton's Bush, Wellington

Scientific classification
- Kingdom: Animalia
- Phylum: Arthropoda
- Clade: Pancrustacea
- Class: Insecta
- Order: Lepidoptera
- Family: Tortricidae
- Genus: Pyrgotis
- Species: P. chrysomela

Binomial name
- Pyrgotis chrysomela (Meyrick, 1914)

Synonyms
- Catamacta chrysomela Meyrick, 1914

= Pyrgotis chrysomela =

Species of moth endemic to New Zealand

Pyrgotis chrysomela is a species of moth of the family Tortricidae. This species was first described by Edward Meyrick in 1914. It is endemic to New Zealand and has been observed in the North and South Islands. This species is associated with Mānuka as well as species in the genus Podocarpus. Larvae web together the leaves of their host species and then feed on new growth. Larvae have been reared on Podocarpus laetus and Podocarpus totara. Adults are on the wing most months of the year.

== Taxonomy ==
This species was first described by Edward Meyrick in 1914 and originally named Catamachta chrysomela. George Hudson discussed and illustrated this species under this name in his 1928 book The butterflies and moths of New Zealand. In 1971 John S. Dugdale placed this species in the genus Pyrgotis. The holotype, collected by George Hudson in January at Kaeo, is held at the Natural History Museum, London.

== Distribution ==
P. chrysomela is endemic to New Zealand. It has been observed in both the North and South Islands.

== Description ==
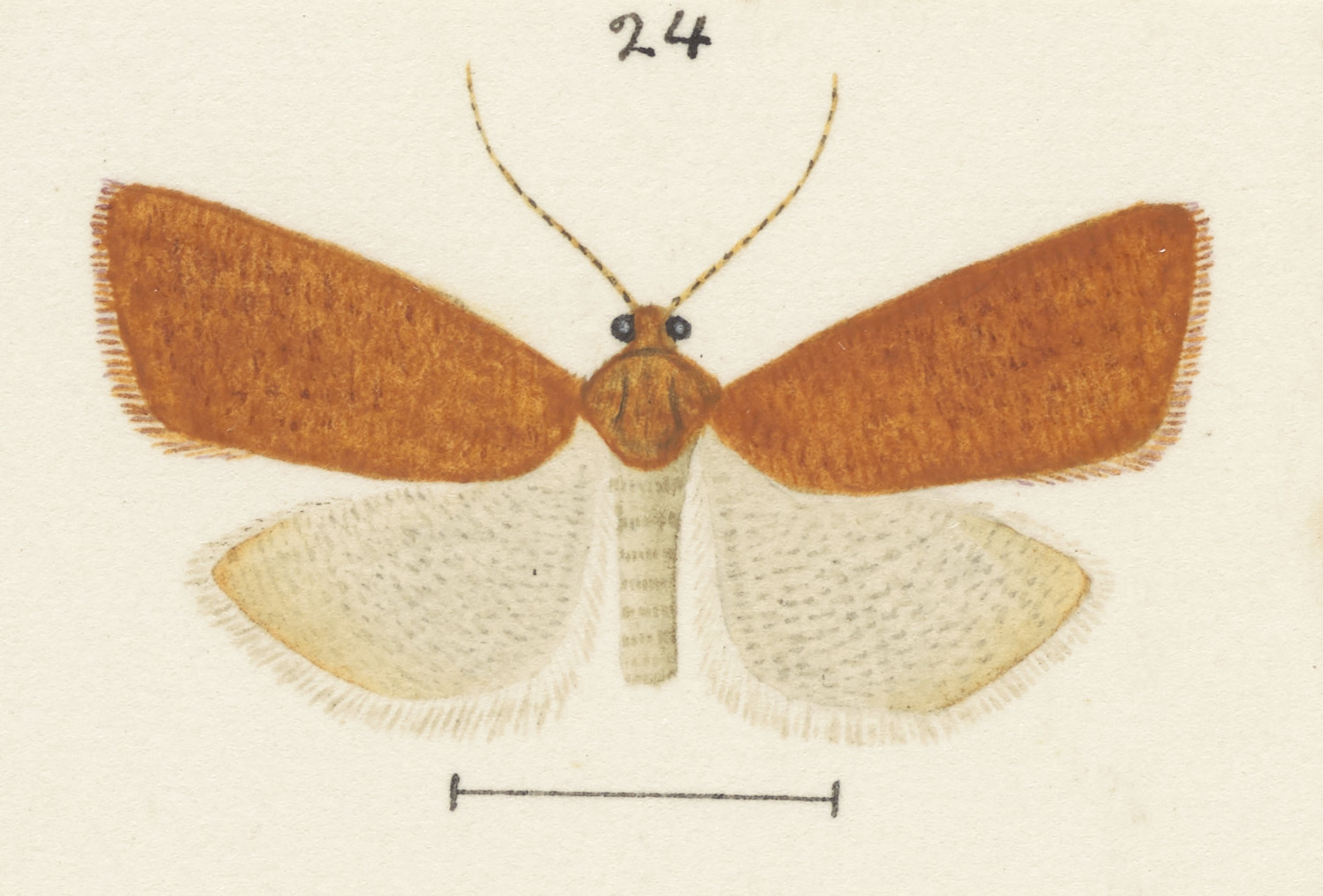
Illustration by Hudson.

The wingspan is about 17 mm. The forewings are very bright, glossy orange-brown with several rows of extremely faint purplish spots in the disc, only visible in a strong light. The hind-wings are grey, tipped with orange-brown at the apex.

It has been hypothesised that there is a grey form of the male of this species although further investigation is needed to confirm that these specimens are a form of P. chrysomela.

== Behaviour ==
The larvae of this species web together the leaves of species in the genus Podocarpus and then feed on the new growth. Adults have been observed on the wing most months of the year but are most commonly observed from October until March.

== Habitat and hosts ==
This species has been observed amongst Leptospermum scoparium. This species is also said to be associated with Podocarpus nivalis. Larvae have been reared on Podocarpus laetus and Podocarpus totara.
