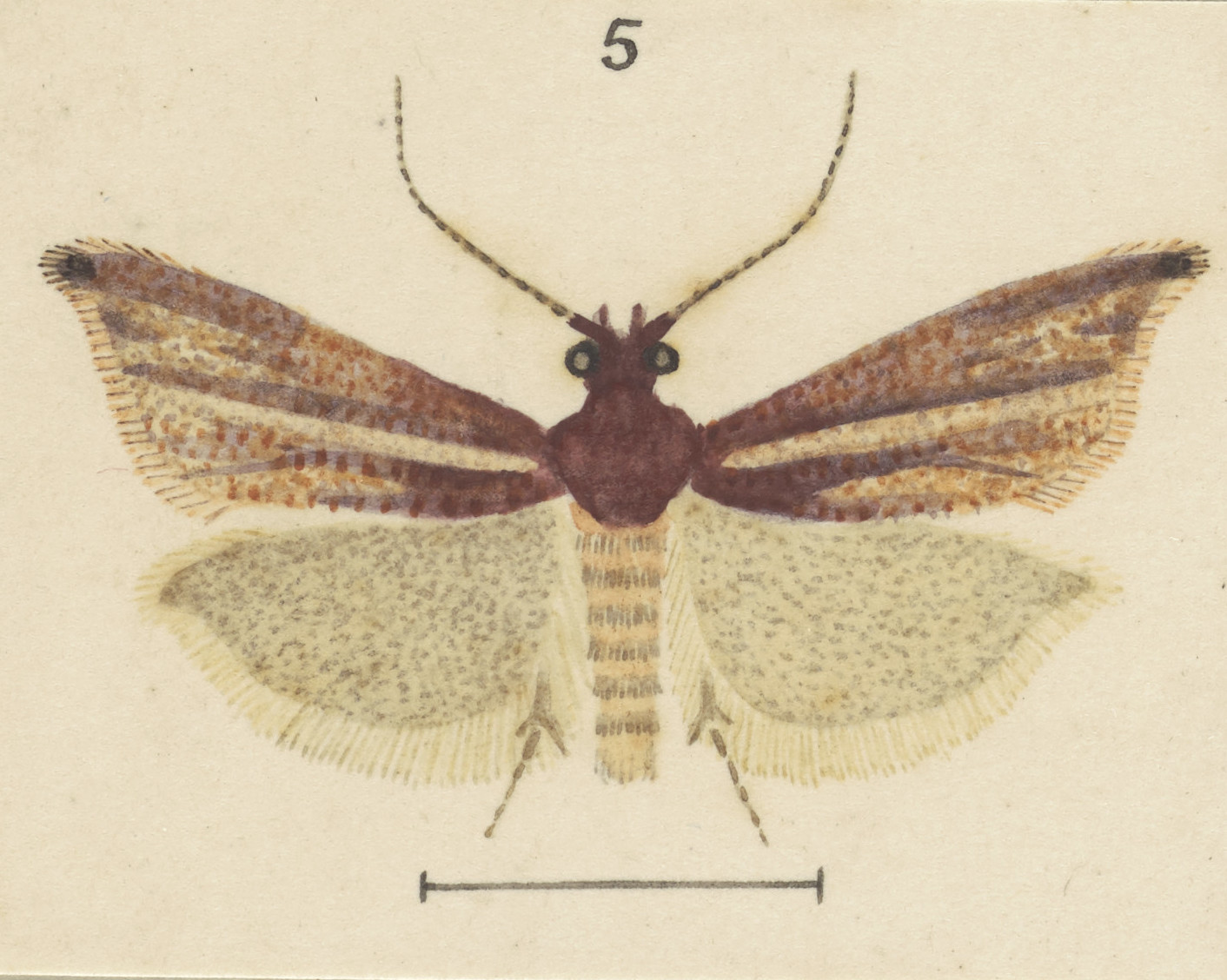

Scientific classification
- Kingdom: Animalia
- Phylum: Arthropoda
- Clade: Pancrustacea
- Class: Insecta
- Order: Lepidoptera
- Family: Tortricidae
- Genus: Pyrgotis
- Species: P. transfixa

Binomial name
- Pyrgotis transfixa (Meyrick, 1924)

Synonyms
- Catamacta transfixa Meyrick, 1924

= Pyrgotis transfixa =

Species of moth endemic to New Zealand

Pyrgotis transfixa is a species of moth of the family Tortricidae. It is endemic to New Zealand and is found in the Wellington region. This species inhabits native forest. Adults are on the wing in December and are attracted to light. It is classified as "At Risk, Naturally Uncommon" by the Department of Conservation.

== Taxonomy ==
This species was first described by Edward Meyrick from a specimen collected by George Hudson at Gollan's Valley, Wellington in December. Meyrick named the species Catamacta transfixa. Hudson described and illustrated this species under that name in his 1928 book The Butterflies and Moths of New Zealand. In 1971 John S. Dugdale placed this species within the genus Pyrgotis. The holotype specimen of this species is held at the Natural History Museum, London.

== Description ==
Meyrick described this species as follows:

♂︎. 15 mm. Head and thorax dark purplish-fuscous mixed with dark red-brown. Palpi dark fuscous. Antennal ciliations 1. Forewings suboblong, costa anteriorly gently arched, with rather broad fold from base to beyond 1/3, termen sinuate, oblique; ferruginous-brown suffusedly reticulated with glistening greyish-violet; a narrow suffused ochreous-whitish median streak from base to termen, similar streaks on veins 6 and 7, on vein 3, and space between this and tornus suffusedly irrorated ochreous-whitish : cilia ferruginous-brown mixed whitish, tips whitish, at apex a violet-grey bar. Hindwings pale grey, very faintly; mottled; cilia whitish.

== Distribution ==
This species is endemic to New Zealand. This species is only known from Wellington. Specimens have been obtained in the Ōrongorongo Valley.

== Biology and life cycle ==
Very little is known of the biology of this species. The adult moths are on the wing in December. They are attracted to light.

== Host species and habitat ==
This species prefers forest habitat. The host species and larvae of this moth are at present unknown.

== Conservation status ==
This species has been classified as having the "At Risk, Naturally Uncommon" conservation status under the New Zealand Threat Classification System.
