= Ōrongorongo River =

River in New Zealand

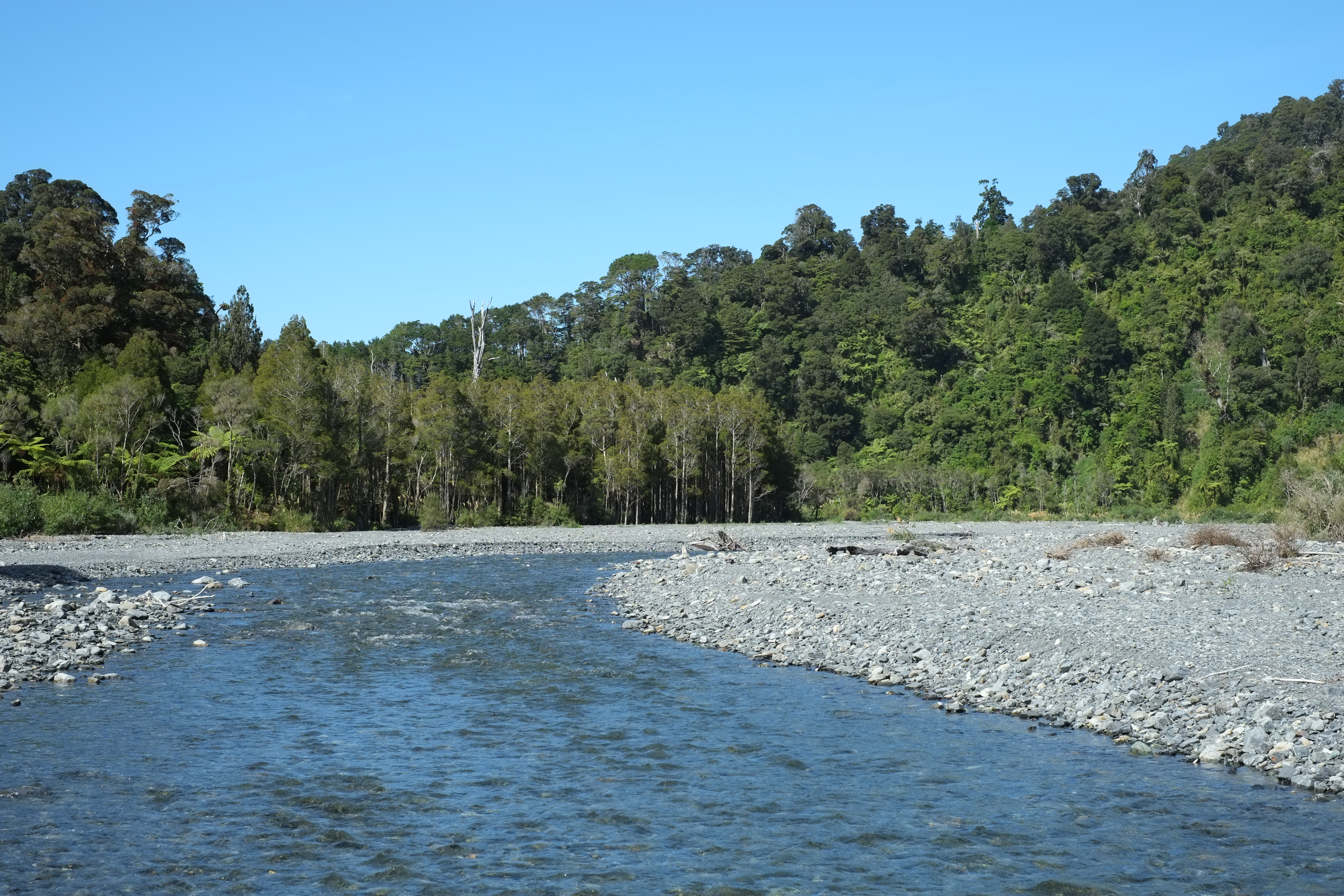
- The Ōrongorongo River near Oaks Hut in the Remutaka Range
- Route of the Ōrongorongo River
- Mouth of the Ōrongorongo River Ōrongorongo River (North Island)
- Native name: Ōrongorongo (Māori)

Location
- Country: New Zealand
- Island: North Island
- Region: Wellington
- District: Lower Hutt

Physical characteristics
- Source: Remutaka Range
  - coordinates: 41.22073°S 175.08435°E
- Mouth: Cook Strait
  - coordinates: 41°25′07″S 174°54′04″E
- Length: 39 km (24 mi)

Basin features
- Progression: Ōrongorongo River → Cook Strait → Pacific Ocean
- Tributaries
  - left: Ryan Creek, North Boulder Creek, Boulder Creek, Matthews Stream, Goat Stream, Browns Stream, Greens Stream, Nettle Stream, Wootton Stream, Peak Stream, Red Rock Stream
  - right: Big Huia Creek, Telephone Creek, Puketaha Creek, Whakanui Creek, Tūrere Stream, Matai Stream
- Waterbodies: Big Bend
- Bridges: Ōrongorongo River Truss Bridge, Ōrongorongo Bridge (Coast Road)

The Ōrongorongo River runs for 32 kilometres (20 mi) southwest through the Ōrongorongo Valley in the southern Remutaka Ranges of the North Island of New Zealand. The river and its associated catchments lie within the bounds of the Remutaka Forest Park, which is administered by the Department of Conservation.

The New Zealand Ministry for Culture and Heritage gives a translation of "place of Rongorongo" [a woman's name] for Ōrongorongo.

Ōrongorongo River is the main artery of the Remutaka Range, draining an area with rainfall of up to 2,400 millimetres (94 in) a year, which is twice as much as the rainfall at the mouth of the river at Cook Strait. For much of its course the river is a braided river, with a wide bed of greywacke shingle and gravel and a number of streams of water. The gravel bed can be seen as light-coloured areas of varying width in the adjacent image.

Because the rainfall in the Remutaka Range often comes in high-intensity rainstorms, the river is prone to violent floods. The most severe of these floods sweep away most of the river's vegetated islands every 15 to 20 years. Between these floods, the shingle islands are gradually colonised by various low growing plants, followed by a host of native shrubs such as tauhinu and mānuka, and eventually small trees.

In December 2019, the approved official geographic name of the river was gazetted as "Ōrongorongo River".

== Recreation ==
Aerial view of the Ōrongorongo Valley

The Ōrongorongo Valley is popular with day walkers and trampers from the Wellington Region. The most popular access is via the Catchpool Valley. The four-hour return Ōrongorongo Track reaches the river where Turere Stream flows into it. From there, a number of day and multi-day tracks, ranging from walking tracks to routes, continue deeper into the Rimutaka Forest Park.

Several Department of Conservation huts, some of them serviced, as well as basic private baches dot the Ōrongorongo Valley, mainly around the river's upper half.

Until the 1850s land transport between Wellington and Wairarapa used a route round the coast via the Ōrongorongo river mouth. In 2013 it became part of a Great Ride cycle route, linking Petone with the existing Remutaka Rail Trail and completing a loop via Ocean Beach and Ōrongorongo on an 18 km (11 mi) farm track, via Turakirae Head. Due to soft sand near the beach and rough rocks over stream fans, a few short sections of the track cannot be cycled and a 2019/20 count of 1,976 trips along the section, was put down to this insufficient infrastructure.

== Gallery ==
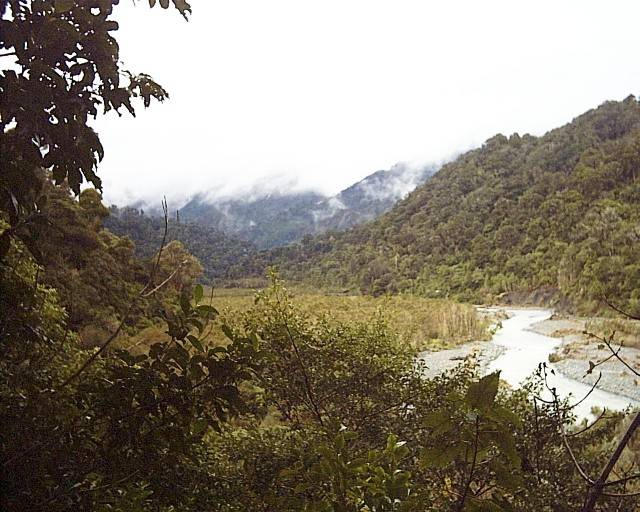
Looking north over the "Mānuka Flats"

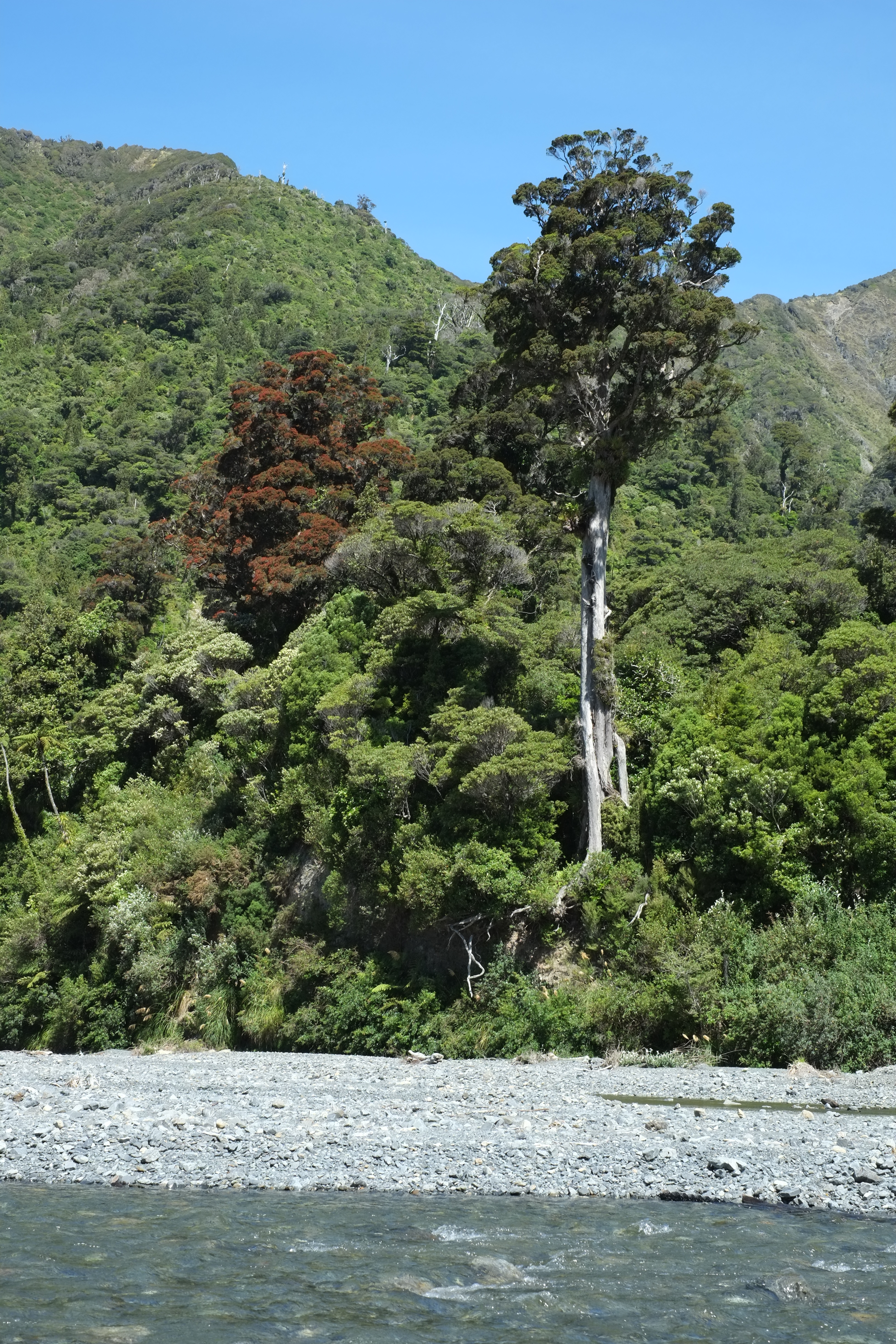
Northern rātā on flower behind Ōrongorongo River

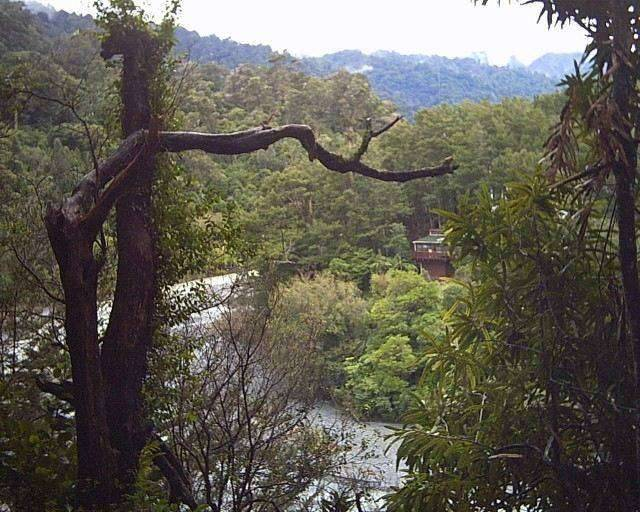
Looking at "Big Bend" from the "Wet Weather Track"

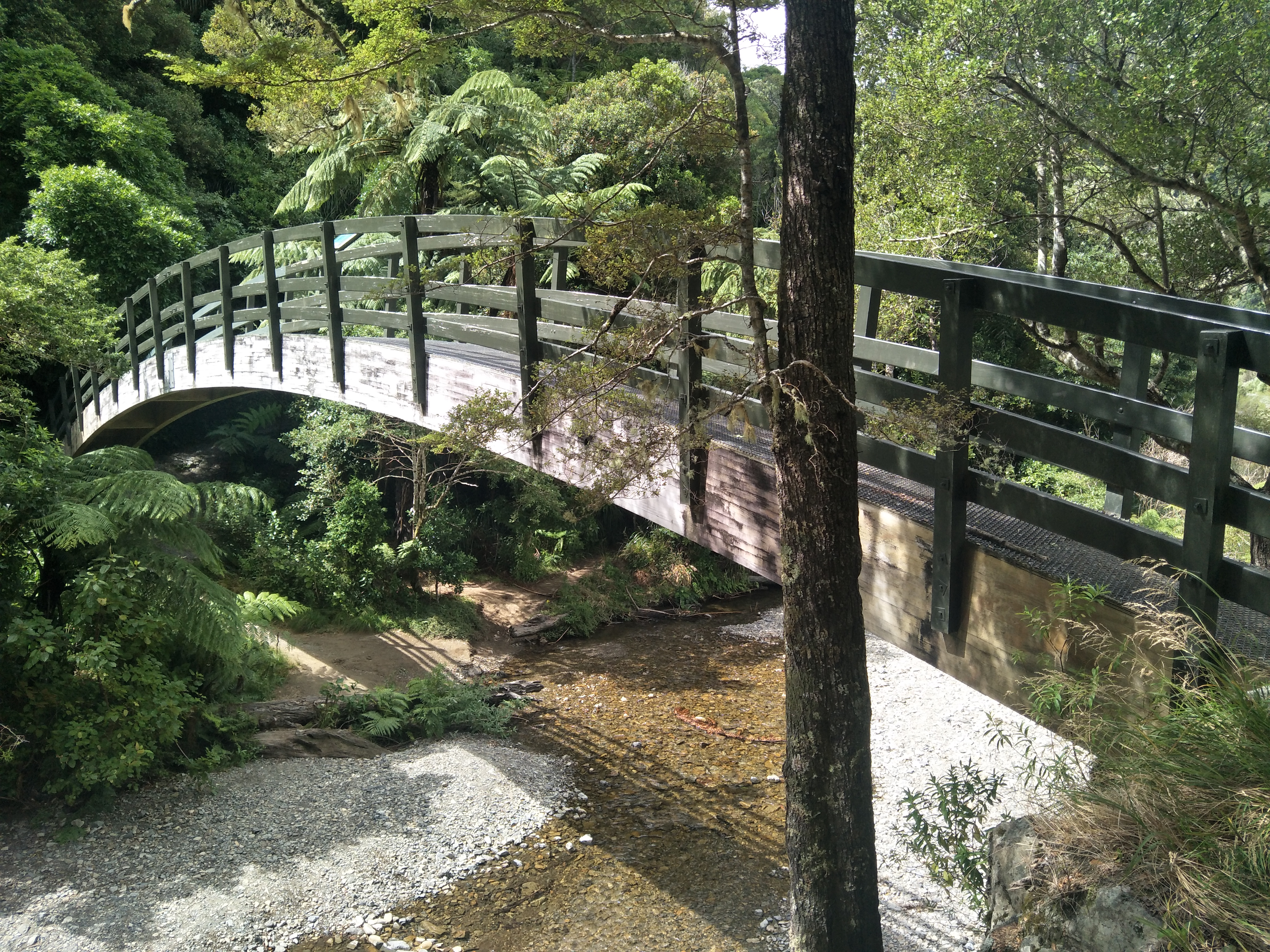
Bridge over Turere Stream, a tributary of the Ōrongorongo River

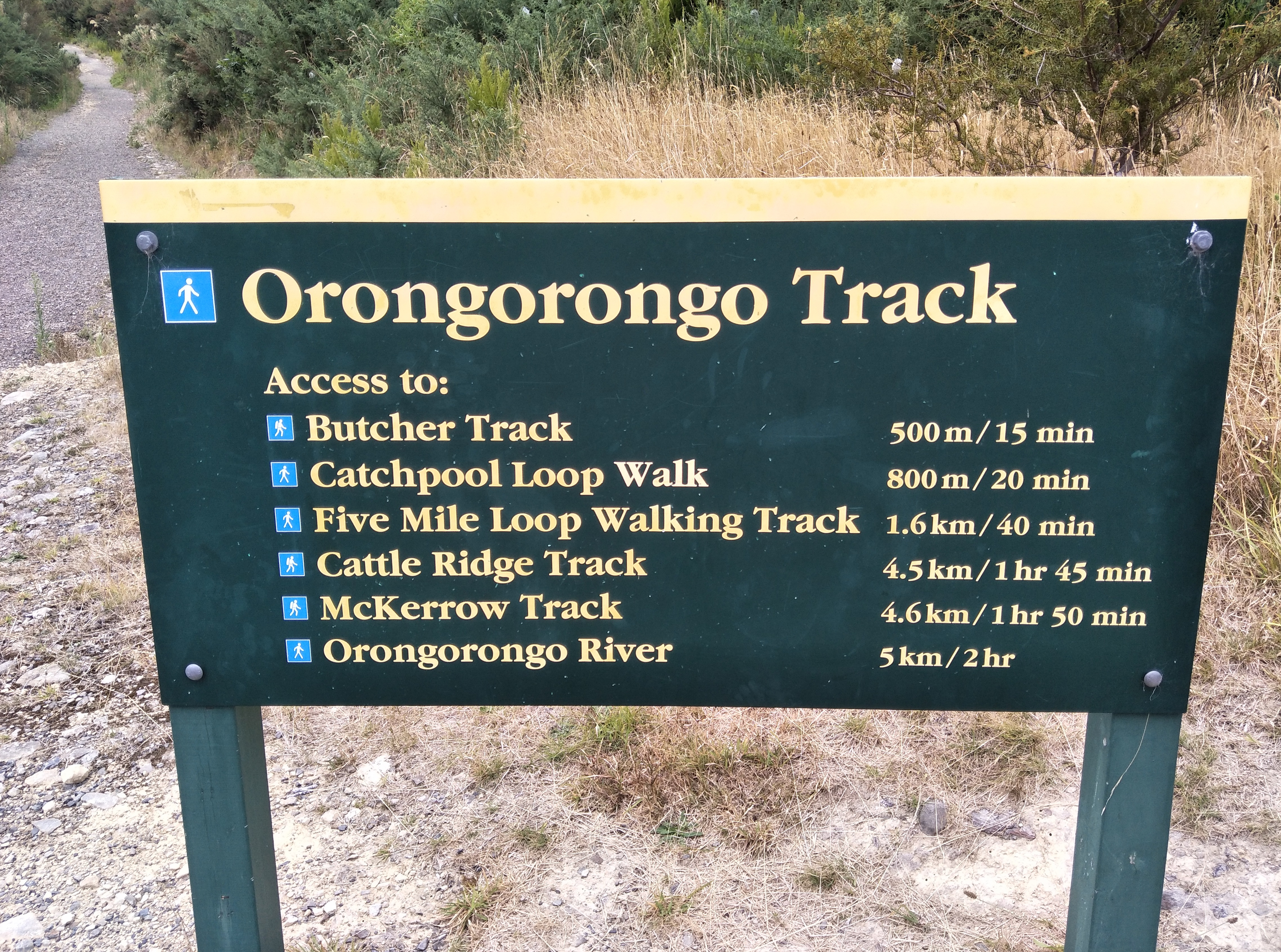
Trailhead Sign for Ōrongorongo Track

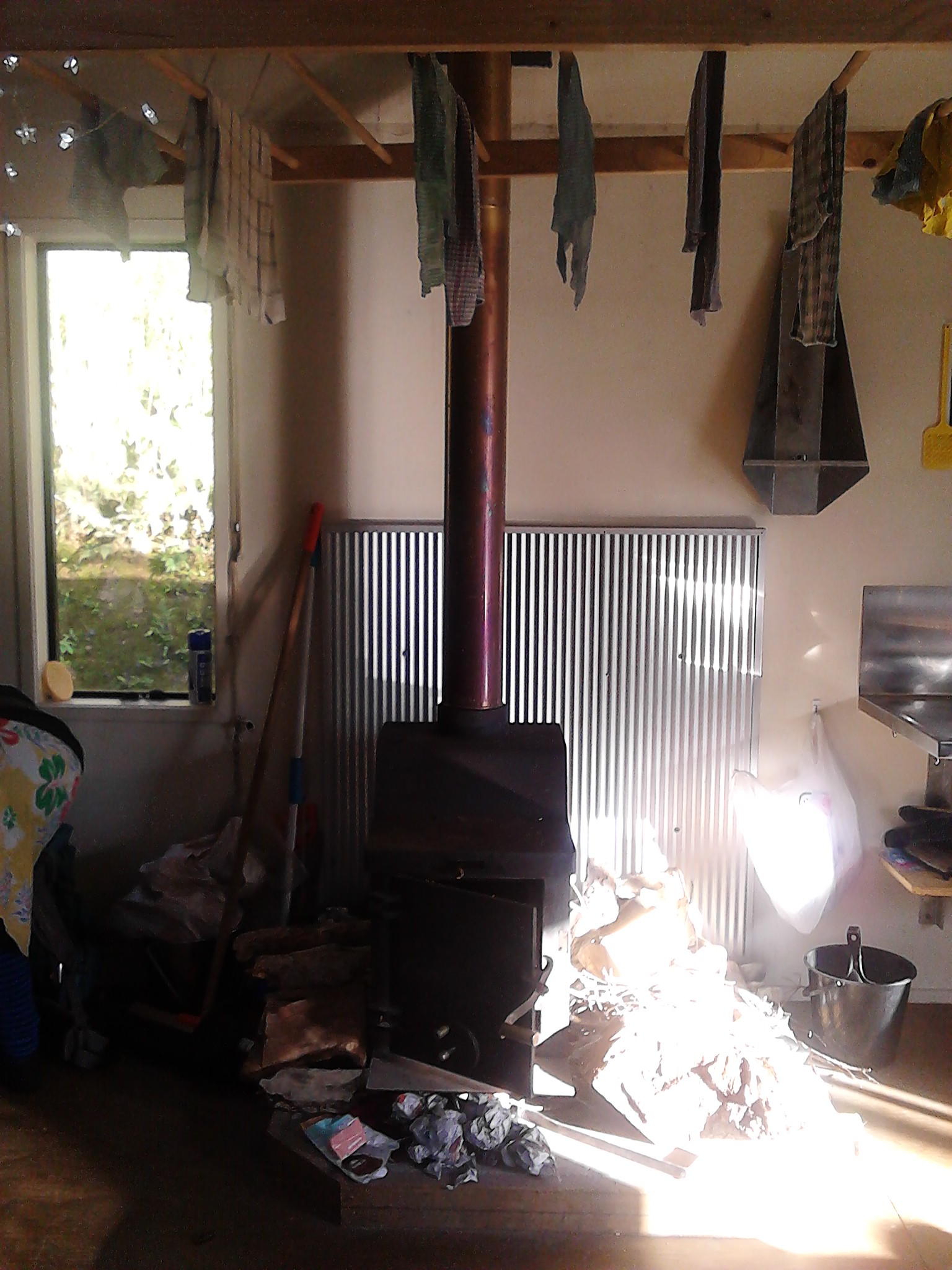
Inside one of the DOC huts 2013

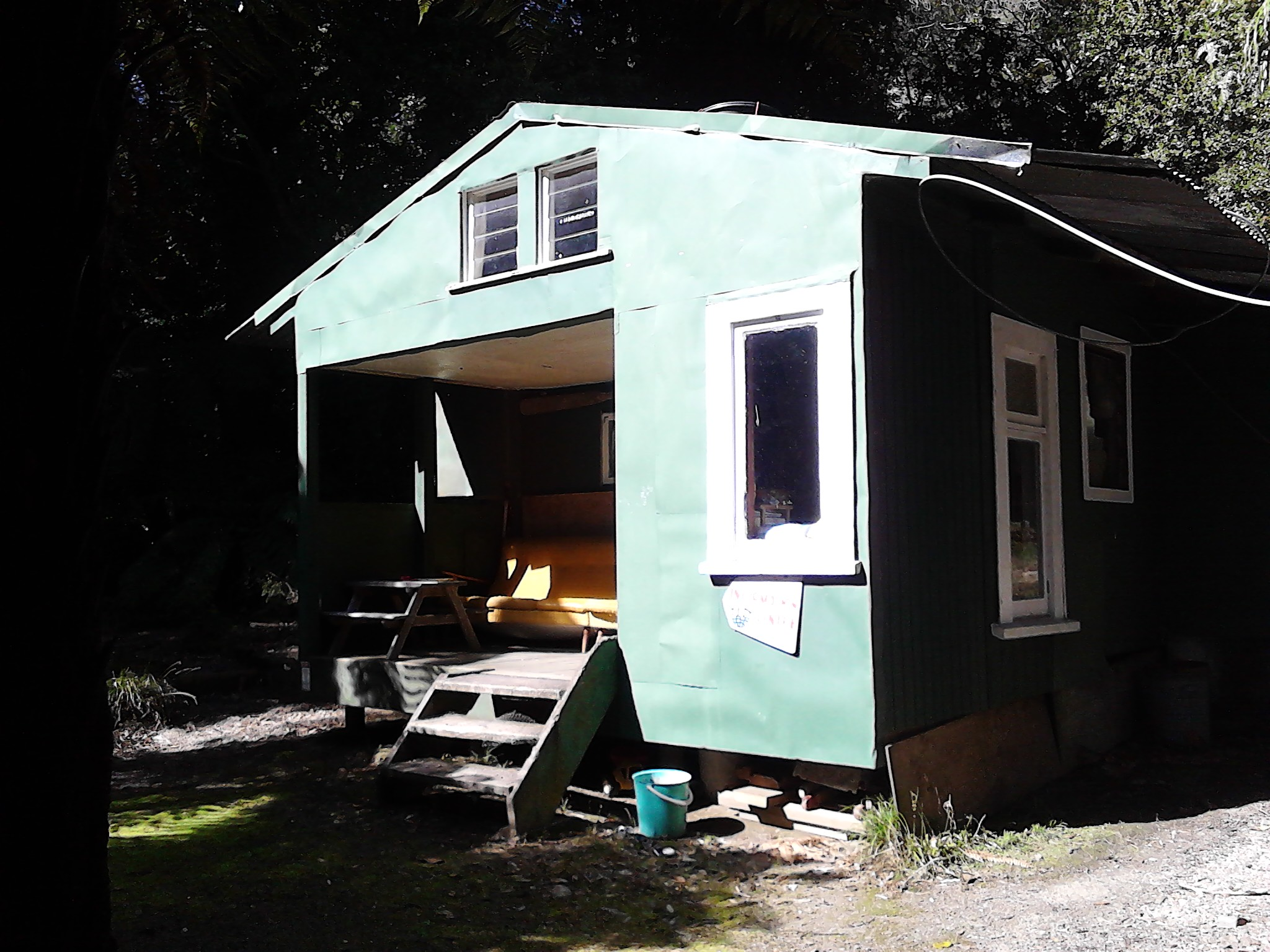
Private bach

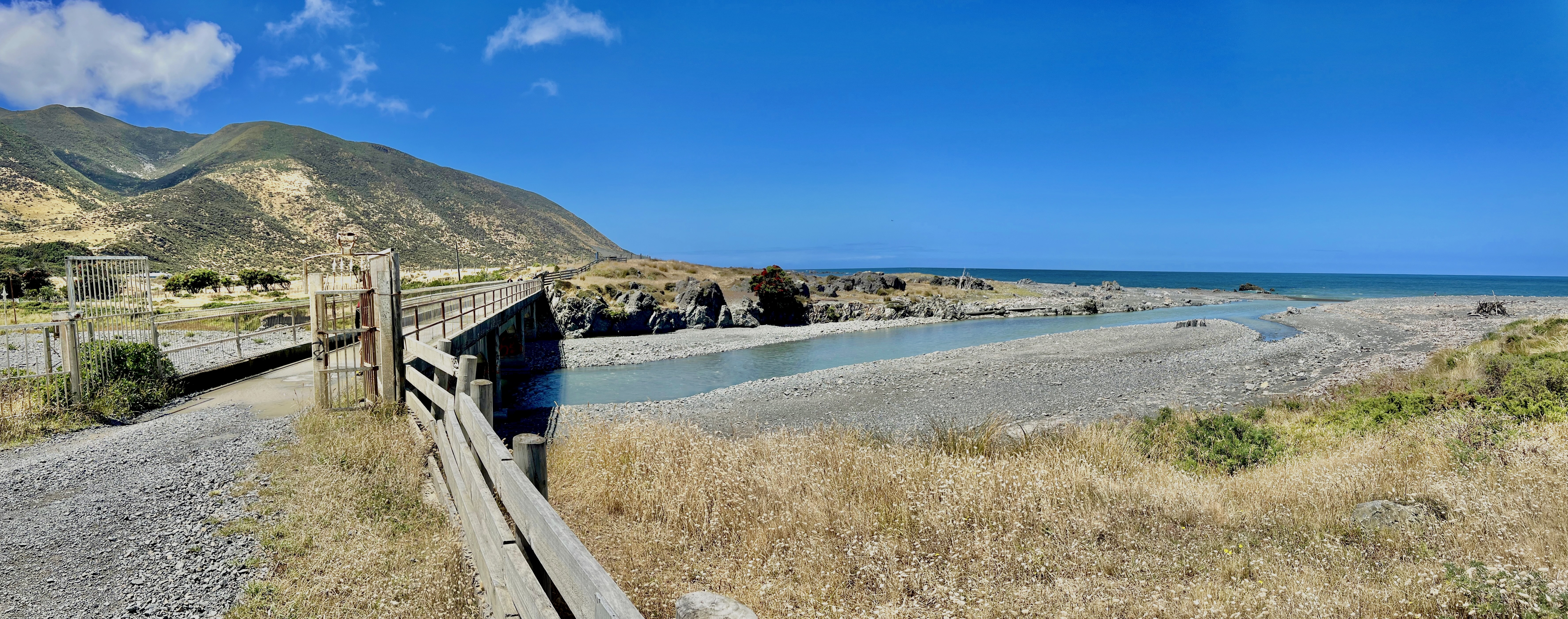
Ōrongorongo river mouth

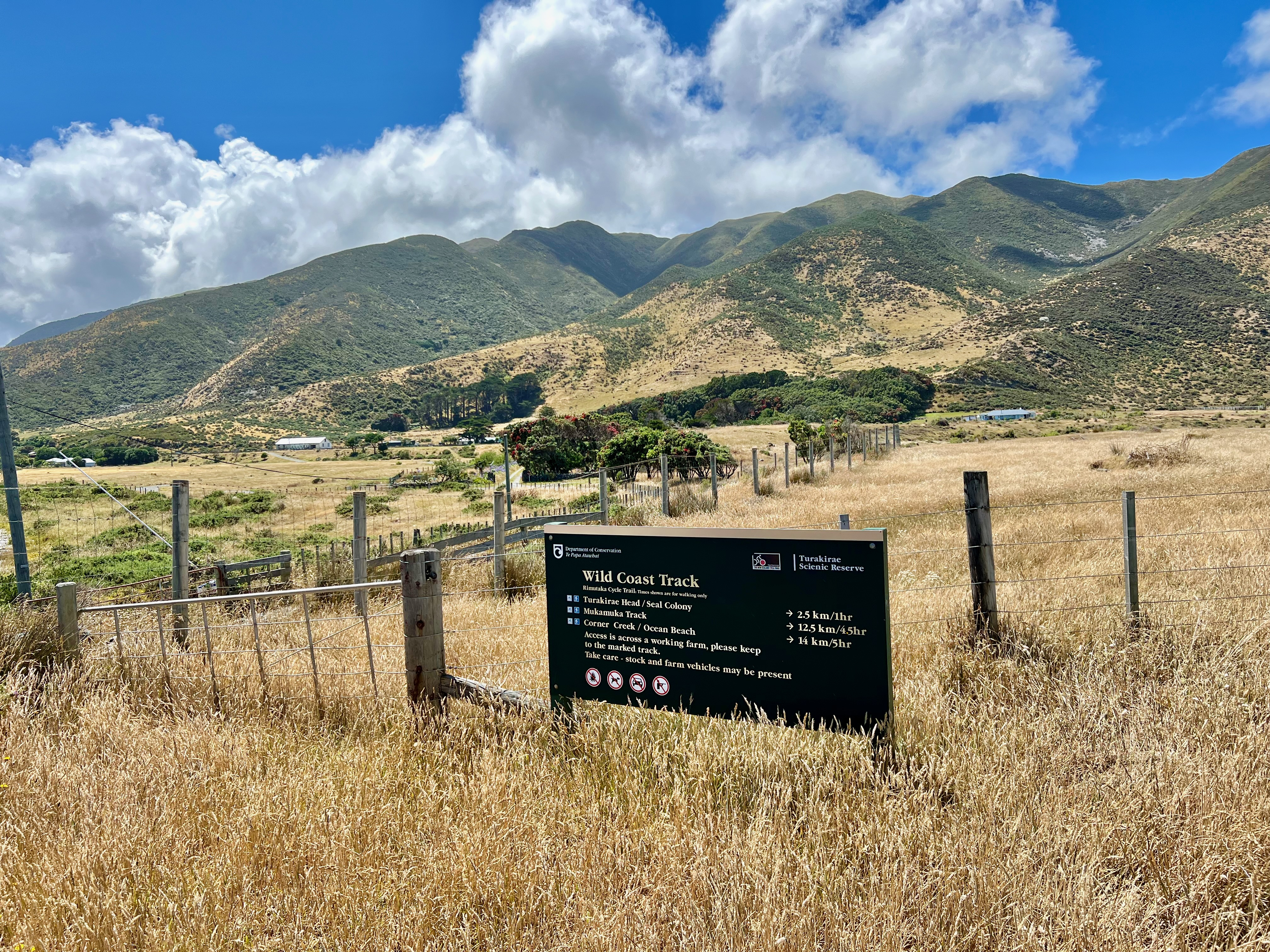
Start of Wild Coast Track and 492m Waimarara hill

== Biodiversity ==
The Ōrongorongo valley is home to the at-risk moth species Pyrgotis transfixa.

== See also ==
- List of rivers of Wellington Region
- List of rivers of New Zealand
