= List of A Country Practice episodes (seasons 1–8) =

The following is an episode list for the Australian drama A Country Practice on Seven Network. From 18 November 1981 to 22 November 1993, a total of 1058 original episodes of A Country Practice aired over its thirteen-season run. Some of the show's episode titles are used more than once. After its cancellation by Seven, A Country Practice was picked up by Network Ten and between April and November 1994, 30 more episodes aired taking the total episode count to 1088.

== Series overview ==
Series	Episodes	Originally released		
Series	Episodes	First released	Last released	Network
1	14	18 November 1981	31 December 1981	Seven Network
2	90	5 January 1982	10 November 1982	Seven Network
3	86	25 January 1983	9 November 1983	Seven Network
4	84	31 January 1984	7 November 1984	Seven Network
5	82	15 January 1985	6 November 1985	Seven Network
6	86	14 January 1986	5 November 1986	Seven Network
7	90	12 January 1987	17 November 1987	Seven Network
8	88	18 January 1988	15 November 1988	Seven Network
9	86	23 January 1989	14 November 1989	Seven Network
10	86	22 January 1990	13 November 1990	Seven Network
11	90	21 January 1991	26 November 1991	Seven Network
12	86	19 January 1992	24 November 1992	Seven Network
13	90	18 January 1993	22 November 1993	Seven Network
14	30	13 April 1994	19 November 1994	Network Ten

== Episode list ==
The transmission dates given refer to the station ATN-7 in Sydney. Dates varied in Melbourne and in other parts of Australia.

=== Season 1 (1981) ===
No. overall	No. in season	Title	Directed by	Written by	Original release date
1	1	"In General Practice: Part 1"	Chris Thomson	James Davern	18 November 1981
2	2	"In General Practice: Part 2"	Chris Thomson	James Davern	19 November 1981
3	3	"Town Tragedy: Part 1"	David Boutland	James Davern	25 November 1981
4	4	"Town Tragedy: Part 2"	David Boutland	James Davern	26 November 1981
5	5	"The Itinerants: Part 1"	Mandy Smith	Anne Brooksbank	2 December 1981
6	6	"The Itinerants: Part 2"	Mandy Smith	Graeme Ellis	3 December 1981
7	7	"They Shoot Cows Don't They: Part 1"	Igor Auzins	José Luis Bayonas	9 December 1981
8	8	"They Shoot Cows Don't They: Part 2"	Igor Auzins	Leon Saunders	10 December 1981
9	9	"Coming Home: Part 1"	Mike Murphy	Anne Brooksbank	16 December 1981
10	10	"Coming Home: Part 2"	Mike Murphy	Moya Wood	17 December 1981
11	11	"Secrets: Part 1"	Leigh Spence	José Luis Bayonas	23 December 1981
12	12	"Secrets: Part 2"	Leigh Spence	David Boutland	24 December 1981
13	13	"Alternatives: Part 1"	Mandy Smith	Leon Saunders	30 December 1981
14	14	"Alternatives: Part 2"	Mandy Smith	Hugh Stuckey	31 December 1981

=== Season 2 (1982) ===
No. overall	No. in season	Title	Directed by	Written by	Original release date
15	1	"Golden Fleece: Part 1"	Chris Thomson	James Davern	6 January 1982
16	2	"Golden Fleece: Part 2"	Chris Thomson	James Davern	7 January 1982
17	3	"Team Work: Part 1"	David Boutland	James Davern	13 January 1982
18	4	"Team Work: Part 2"	David Boutland	James Davern	14 January 1982
19	5	"Suffer Little Children: Part 1"	Mandy Smith	Anne Brooksbank	20 January 1982
20	6	"Suffer Little Children: Part 2"	Mandy Smith	Graeme Ellis	21 January 1982
21	7	"Mates: Part 1"	Igor Auzins	José Luis Bayonas	27 January 1982
22	8	"Mates: Part 2"	Igor Auzins	Leon Saunders	28 January 1982
23	9	"Agoraphobic Sons and Lovers: Part 1"	Mike Murphy	Anne Brooksbank	2 February 1982
24	10	"Agoraphobic Sons and Lovers: Part 2"	Mike Murphy	Moya Wood	3 February 1982
25	11	"I Know Where She's Gone: Part 1"	Leigh Spence	José Luis Bayonas	9 February 1982
26	12	"I Know Where She's Gone: Part 2"	Leigh Spence	David Boutland	10 February 1982
27	13	"A Little Knowledge: Part 1"	Mandy Smith	Leon Saunders	16 February 1982
28	14	"A Little Knowledge: Part 2"	Mandy Smith	Hugh Stuckey	17 February 1982
29	15	"A Pit to Hiss In: Part 1"	Mandy Smith	Hugh Stuckey	23 February 1982
30	16	"A Pit to Hiss In: Part 2"	Mandy Smith	Hugh Stuckey	24 February 1982
31	17	"A Sore Throat: Part 1"	Mandy Smith	Hugh Stuckey	2 March 1982
32	18	"A Sore Throat: Part 2"	Mandy Smith	Hugh Stuckey	3 March 1982
33	19	"Beating Around the Bush: Part 1"	Mandy Smith	Hugh Stuckey	9 March 1982
34	20	"Beating Around the Bush: Part 2"	Mandy Smith	Hugh Stuckey	10 March 1982
35	21	"Never Called Me Mother: Part 1"	Mandy Smith	Hugh Stuckey	16 March 1982
36	22	"Never Called Me Mother: Part 2"	Mandy Smith	Hugh Stuckey	17 March 1982
37	23	"Shootin' Through: Part 1"	Mandy Smith	Hugh Stuckey	23 March 1982
38	24	"Shootin' Through: Part 2"	Mandy Smith	Hugh Stuckey	24 March 1982
39	25	"Pig in a Poke: Part 1"	Mandy Smith	Hugh Stuckey	30 March 1982
40	26	"Pig in a Poke: Part 2"	Mandy Smith	Hugh Stuckey	31 March 1982
41	27	"Did She Fall: Part 1"	Mandy Smith	Hugh Stuckey	6 April 1982
42	28	"Did She Fall: Part 2"	Mandy Smith	Hugh Stuckey	7 April 1982
43	29	"Lovers Labour Lost: Part 1"	Mandy Smith	Hugh Stuckey	13 April 1982
44	30	"Lovers Labour Lost: Part 2"	Mandy Smith	Hugh Stuckey	14 April 1982
45	31	"Close Encounters of the Wrong Kind: Part 1"	Mandy Smith	Hugh Stuckey	20 April 1982
46	32	"Close Encounters of the Wrong Kind: Part 2"	Mandy Smith	Hugh Stuckey	21 April 1982
47	33	"The Second Coming: Part 1"	Mandy Smith	Hugh Stuckey	27 April 1982
48	34	"The Second Coming: Part 2"	Mandy Smith	Hugh Stuckey	28 April 1982
49	35	"Come Blow Your Horn: Part 1"	Mandy Smith	Hugh Stuckey	4 May 1982
50	36	"Come Blow Your Horn: Part 2"	Mandy Smith	Hugh Stuckey	5 May 1982
51	37	"Frankie and Johnny: Part 1"	Mandy Smith	Hugh Stuckey	11 May 1982
52	38	"Frankie and Johnny: Part 2"	Mandy Smith	Hugh Stuckey	12 May 1982
53	39	"The Odd Couple: Part 1"	Mandy Smith	Hugh Stuckey	18 May 1982
54	40	"The Odd Couple: Part 2"	Mandy Smith	Hugh Stuckey	19 May 1982
55	41	"A Fearful Thing: Part 1"	Mandy Smith	Hugh Stuckey	25 May 1982
56	42	"A Fearful Thing: Part 2"	Mandy Smith	Hugh Stuckey	26 May 1982
57	43	"Win Some, Lose Some: Part 1"	Mandy Smith	Hugh Stuckey	1 June 1982
58	44	"Win Some, Lose Some: Part 2"	Mandy Smith	Hugh Stuckey	2 June 1982
59	45	"Eyes of the Beholder: Part 1"	Mandy Smith	Hugh Stuckey	8 June 1982
60	46	"Eyes of the Beholder: Part 2"	Mandy Smith	Hugh Stuckey	9 June 1982
61	47	"Weight for Age: Part 1"	Mandy Smith	Hugh Stuckey	15 June 1982
62	48	"Weight for Age: Part 2"	Mandy Smith	Hugh Stuckey	16 June 1982
63	49	"Prisoner of the Valley: Part 1"	Mandy Smith	Hugh Stuckey	22 June 1982
64	50	"Prisoner of the Valley: Part 2"	Mandy Smith	Hugh Stuckey	23 June 1982
65	51	"Cheap Dream: Part 1"	Mandy Smith	Hugh Stuckey	29 June 1982
66	52	"Cheap Dream: Part 2"	Mandy Smith	Hugh Stuckey	30 June 1982
67	53	"Occupational Hazard: Part 1"	Mandy Smith	Hugh Stuckey	6 July 1982
68	54	"Occupational Hazard: Part 2"	Mandy Smith	Hugh Stuckey	7 July 1982
69	55	"Hear No Evil: Part 1"	Mandy Smith	Hugh Stuckey	13 July 1982
70	56	"Hear No Evil: Part 2"	Mandy Smith	Hugh Stuckey	14 July 1982
71	57	"The Luck of the Drew: Part 1"	Mandy Smith	Hugh Stuckey	20 July 1982
72	58	"The Luck of the Drew: Part 2"	Mandy Smith	Hugh Stuckey	21 July 1982
73	59	"One for the Road: Part 1"	Mandy Smith	Hugh Stuckey	27 July 1982
74	60	"One for the Road: Part 2"	Mandy Smith	Hugh Stuckey	28 July 1982
75	61	"A Fair Day's Work: Part 1"	Mandy Smith	Hugh Stuckey	3 August 1982
76	62	"A Fair Day's Work: Part 2"	Mandy Smith	Hugh Stuckey	4 August 1982
77	63	"No Apparent Reason: Part 1"	Mandy Smith	Hugh Stuckey	10 August 1982
78	64	"No Apparent Reason: Part 2"	Mandy Smith	Hugh Stuckey	11 August 1982
79	65	"Road to Nowhere: Part 1"	Mandy Smith	Hugh Stuckey	17 August 1982
80	66	"Road to Nowhere: Part 2"	Mandy Smith	Hugh Stuckey	18 August 1982
81	67	"Coming Ready or Not: Part 1"	Mandy Smith	Hugh Stuckey	24 August 1982
82	68	"Coming Ready or Not: Part 2"	Mandy Smith	Hugh Stuckey	25 August 1982
83	69	"What It Takes: Part 1"	Mandy Smith	Hugh Stuckey	31 August 1982
84	70	"What It Takes: Part 2"	Mandy Smith	Hugh Stuckey	1 September 1982
85	71	"The Second Deadly Sin: Part 1"	Mandy Smith	Hugh Stuckey	7 September 1982
86	72	"The Second Deadly Sin: Part 2"	Mandy Smith	Hugh Stuckey	8 September 1982
87	73	"The Seeds of Discontent: Part 1"	Mandy Smith	Hugh Stuckey	14 September 1982
88	74	"The Seeds of Discontent: Part 2"	Mandy Smith	Hugh Stuckey	15 September 1982
89	75	"A Sign of Affection: Part 1"	Mandy Smith	Hugh Stuckey	21 September 1982
90	76	"A Sign of Affection: Part 2"	Mandy Smith	Hugh Stuckey	22 September 1982
91	77	"Field of Thunder: Part 1"	Mandy Smith	Hugh Stuckey	28 September 1982
92	78	"Field of Thunder: Part 2"	Mandy Smith	Hugh Stuckey	29 September 1982
93	79	"The Push: Part 1"	Mandy Smith	Hugh Stuckey	5 October 1982
94	80	"The Push: Part 2"	Mandy Smith	Hugh Stuckey	6 October 1982
95	81	"Acts of Kindness: Part 1"	Mandy Smith	Hugh Stuckey	12 October 1982
96	82	"Acts of Kindness: Part 2"	Mandy Smith	Hugh Stuckey	13 October 1982
97	83	"A Human Reaction: Part 1"	Mandy Smith	Hugh Stuckey	19 October 1982
98	84	"A Human Reaction: Part 2"	Mandy Smith	Hugh Stuckey	20 October 1982
99	85	"Show Down: Part 1"	Mandy Smith	Hugh Stuckey	26 October 1982
100	86	"Show Down: Part 2"	Mandy Smith	Hugh Stuckey	27 October 1982
101	87	"Pie in the Sky: Part 1"	Mandy Smith	Hugh Stuckey	2 November 1982
102	88	"Pie in the Sky: Part 2"	Mandy Smith	Hugh Stuckey	3 November 1982
103	89	"Stirring the Possum: Part 1"	Mandy Smith	Hugh Stuckey	9 November 1982
104	90	"Stirring the Possum: Part 2"	Mandy Smith	Hugh Stuckey	10 November 1982

=== Season 3 (1983) ===
No. overall	No. in season	Title	Directed by	Written by	Original release date
105	1	"Cup Fever: Part 1"	Mandy Smith	Hugh Stuckey	25 January 1983
106	2	"Cup Fever: Part 2"	Mandy Smith	Hugh Stuckey	26 January 1983
107	3	"Little Voices: Part 1"	Chris Thomson	James Davern	1 February 1983
108	4	"Little Voices: Part 2"	Chris Thomson	James Davern	2 February 1983
109	5	"Grace and Favour: Part 1"	Chris Thomson	James Davern	8 February 1983
110	6	"Grace and Favour: Part 2"	Chris Thomson	James Davern	9 February 1983
111	7	"Breaking Point: Part 1"	Chris Thomson	James Davern	15 February 1983
112	8	"Breaking Point: Part 2"	Chris Thomson	James Davern	16 February 1983
113	9	"Just Another Patient: Part 1"	Chris Thomson	James Davern	22 February 1983
114	10	"Just Another Patient: Part 2"	Chris Thomson	James Davern	23 February 1983
115	11	"Truth and Consequences: Part 1"	Chris Thomson	James Davern	1 March 1983
116	12	"Truth and Consequences: Part 2"	Chris Thomson	James Davern	2 March 1983
117	13	"Who Cares: Part 1"	Chris Thomson	James Davern	8 March 1983
118	14	"Who Cares: Part 2"	Chris Thomson	James Davern	9 March 1983
119	15	"September Song: Part 1"	Chris Thomson	James Davern	15 March 1983
120	16	"September Song: Part 2"	Chris Thomson	James Davern	16 March 1983
121	17	"The Reckoning: Part 1"	Chris Thomson	James Davern	22 March 1983
122	18	"The Reckoning: Part 2"	Chris Thomson	James Davern	23 March 1983
123	19	"The Winds of Change: Part 1"	Chris Thomson	James Davern	29 March 1983
124	20	"The Winds of Change: Part 2"	Chris Thomson	James Davern	30 March 1983
125	21	"Love and Glory: Part 1"	Chris Thomson	James Davern	5 April 1983
126	22	"Love and Glory: Part 2"	Chris Thomson	James Davern	6 April 1983
127	23	"So, Life Wasn't Meant to Be Easy: Part 1"	Chris Thomson	James Davern	12 April 1983
128	24	"So, Life Wasn't Meant to Be Easy: Part 2"	Chris Thomson	James Davern	13 April 1983
129	25	"Another Man's Poison: Part 1"	Chris Thomson	James Davern	19 April 1983
130	26	"Another Man's Poison: Part 2"	Chris Thomson	James Davern	20 April 1983
131	27	"Hair of the Dog: Part 1"	Chris Thomson	James Davern	26 April 1983
132	28	"Hair of the Dog: Part 2"	Chris Thomson	James Davern	27 April 1983
133	29	"See Ya: Part 1"	Chris Thomson	James Davern	3 May 1983
134	30	"See Ya: Part 2"	Chris Thomson	James Davern	4 April 1983
135	31	"Warning Signs: Part 1"	Chris Thomson	James Davern	10 May 1983
136	32	"Warning Signs: Part 2"	Chris Thomson	James Davern	11 April 1983
137	33	"No More Mr. Nice Guy: Part 1"	Chris Thomson	James Davern	17 May 1983
138	34	"No More Mr. Nice Guy: Part 2"	Chris Thomson	James Davern	18 April 1983
139	35	"Fruit of the Vine: Part 1"	Chris Thomson	James Davern	24 May 1983
140	36	"Fruit of the Vine: Part 2"	Chris Thomson	James Davern	25 April 1983
141	37	"A Woman's Place: Part 1"	Chris Thomson	James Davern	31 May 1983
142	38	"A Woman's Place: Part 2"	Chris Thomson	James Davern	1 June 1983
143	39	"Still Life: Part 1"	Chris Thomson	James Davern	7 June 1983
144	40	"Still Life: Part 2"	Chris Thomson	James Davern	8 June 1983
145	41	"Lost Weekend: Part 1"	Chris Thomson	James Davern	14 June 1983
146	42	"Lost Weekend: Part 2"	Chris Thomson	James Davern	15 June 1983
147	43	"The Wandin Valley Connection: Part 1"	Chris Thomson	James Davern	21 June 1983
148	44	"The Wandin Valley Connection: Part 2"	Chris Thomson	James Davern	22 June 1983
149	45	"The Sentimental Bloke: Part 1"	Chris Thomson	James Davern	28 June 1983
150	46	"The Sentimental Bloke: Part 2"	Chris Thomson	James Davern	29 June 1983
151	47	"A Lady's Choice: Part 1"	Chris Thomson	James Davern	6 July 1983
152	48	"A Lady's Choice: Part 2"	Chris Thomson	James Davern	7 July 1983
153	49	"Bush Lore: Part 1"	Chris Thomson	James Davern	13 July 1983
154	50	"Bush Lore: Part 2"	Chris Thomson	James Davern	14 July 1983
155	51	"Kicking the Habit: Part 1"	Chris Thomson	James Davern	19 July 1983
156	52	"Kicking the Habit: Part 2"	Chris Thomson	James Davern	20 July 1983
157	53	"Never Count Your Chooks: Part 1"	Chris Thomson	James Davern	26 July 1983
158	54	"Never Count Your Chooks: Part 2"	Chris Thomson	James Davern	27 July 1983
159	55	"All Fired Up: Part 1"	Chris Thomson	James Davern	2 August 1983
160	56	"All Fired Up: Part 2"	Chris Thomson	James Davern	3 August 1983
161	57	"Raking Over the Ashes: Part 1"	Chris Thomson	James Davern	3 August 1983
162	58	"Raking Over the Ashes: Part 2"	Chris Thomson	James Davern	4 August 1983
163	59	"A Good Cause: Part 1"	Chris Thomson	James Davern	10 August 1983
164	60	"A Good Cause: Part 2"	Chris Thomson	James Davern	11 August 1983
165	61	"Positive Steps: Part 1"	Chris Thomson	James Davern	17 August 1983
166	62	"Positive Steps: Part 2"	Chris Thomson	James Davern	18 August 1983
167	63	"Kith and Kin: Part 1"	Chris Thomson	James Davern	30 August 1983
168	64	"Kith and Kin: Part 2"	Chris Thomson	James Davern	31 August 1983
169	65	"Running Away: Part 1"	Chris Thomson	James Davern	6 September 1983
170	66	"Running Away: Part 2"	Chris Thomson	James Davern	7 September 1983
171	67	"My Son, My Son: Part 1"	Chris Thomson	James Davern	13 September 1983
172	68	"My Son, My Son: Part 2"	Chris Thomson	James Davern	14 September 1983
173	69	"Tipping the Balance: Part 1"	Chris Thomson	James Davern	20 September 1983
174	70	"Tipping the Balance: Part 2"	Chris Thomson	James Davern	21 September 1983
175	71	"Pioneering Spirit: Part 1"	Chris Thomson	James Davern	27 September 1983
176	72	"Pioneering Spirit: Part 2"	Chris Thomson	James Davern	28 September 1983
177	73	"Taking the Plunge: Part 1"	Chris Thomson	James Davern	4 October 1983
178	74	"Taking the Plunge: Part 2"	Chris Thomson	James Davern	5 October 1983
179	75	"Spellbound: Part 1"	Chris Thomson	James Davern	11 October 1983
180	76	"Spellbound: Part 2"	Chris Thomson	James Davern	12 October 1983
181	77	"Promises, Promises: Part 1"	Chris Thomson	James Davern	18 October 1983
182	78	"Promises, Promises: Part 2"	Chris Thomson	James Davern	19 October 1983
183	79	"From This Day Forward: Part 1"	Chris Thomson	James Davern	25 October 1983
184	80	"From This Day Forward: Part 2"	Chris Thomson	James Davern	26 October 1983
185	81	"Got It Made: Part 1"	Chris Thomson	James Davern	1 November 1983
186	82	"Got It Made: Part 2"	Chris Thomson	James Davern	2 November 1983
187	83	"Have I Got a Deal for : Part 1"	Chris Thomson	James Davern	8 November 1983
188	84	"Have I Got a Deal for : Part 2"	Chris Thomson	James Davern	8 November 1983
189	85	"Wednesday's Child: Part 1"	Chris Thomson	James Davern	9 November 1983
190	86	"Wednesday's Child: Part 2"	Chris Thomson	James Davern	9 November 1983

=== Season 4 (1984) ===
No. overall	No. in season	Title	Directed by	Written by	Original release date
191	1	"Part of the Family: Part 1"	Chris Adshead	Kate Schofield	31 January 1984
192	2	"Part of the Family: Part 2"	Chris Adshead	David Boutland	1 February 1984
193	3	"Second Chance: Part 1"	Gary Conway	Leon Saunders	7 February 1984
194	4	"Second Chance: Part 2"	Gary Conway	Luis Bayonas	8 February 1984
195	5	"It's So Easy: Part 1"	Bruce Best	Hugh Stuckey	14 February 1984
196	6	"It's So Easy: Part 2"	Bruce Best	Agi Schreck	15 February 1984
197	7	"Partners: Part 1"	Russell Webb	David Allen	21 February 1984
198	8	"Partners: Part 2"	Russell Webb	Anthony Wheeler	22 February 1984
199	9	"Once Upon A Time: Part 1"	Peter Maxwell	David Boutland	28 February 1984
200	10	"Once Upon A Time: Part 2"	Peter Maxwell	Leon Saunders	29 February 1984
201	11	"When the Bough Breaks: Part 1"	Gary Conway	Judith Colquhoun	6 March 1984
202	12	"When the Bough Breaks: Part 2"	Gary Conway	Judith Colquhoun	7 March 1984
203	13	"A Sense of Loss: Part 1"	Russell Webb	Agi Schreck	13 March 1984
204	14	"A Sense of Loss: Part 2"	Russell Webb	Sheila Sibley	14 March 1984
205	15	"On the Sheep's Back: Part 1"	Robert Meillon	John Graham	20 March 1984
206	16	"On the Sheep's Back: Part 2"	Robert Meillon	Forrest Redlich	21 March 1984
207	17	"The Last Laugh: Part 1"	Peter Maxwell	Forrest Redlich	27 March 1984
208	18	"The Last Laugh: Part 2"	Peter Maxwell	Hugh Stuckey	28 March 1984
209	19	"Elementary Miss Watson: Part 1"	Leigh Spence	Forrest Redlich	3 April 1984
210	20	"Elementary Miss Watson: Part 2"	Leigh Spence	Leon Saunders	4 April 1984
211	21	"The Best Thing for Everybody: Part 1"	Russell Webb	Margaret Mitchell	10 April 1984
212	22	"The Best Thing for Everybody: Part 2"	Russell Webb	David Boutland	11 April 1984
213	23	"Moment of Truth: Part 1"	Robert Meillon	Peter Kinloch	17 April 1984
214	24	"Moment of Truth: Part 2"	Robert Meillon	Agi Schreck	18 April 1984
215	25	"A Touch of Class: Part 1"	Peter Maxwell	Sheila Sibley	24 April 1984
216	26	"A Touch of Class: Part 2"	Peter Maxwell	David Allen	25 April 1984
217	27	"Unemployment, A Health Hazard: Part 1"	Mandy Smith	Margaret Mitchell	1 May 1984
218	28	"Unemployment, A Health Hazard: Part 2"	Mandy Smith	Hugh Stuckey	1 May 1984
219	29	"Horse of a Different Colour: Part 1"	Russell Webb	Forrest Redlich	2 May 1984
220	30	"Horse of a Different Colour: Part 2"	Russell Webb	Michael Freundt	2 May 1984
221	31	"Invasion of Privacy: Part 1"	Russell Webb	Foveaux Kirby	8 May 1984
222	32	"Invasion of Privacy: Part 2"	Russell Webb	Judith Colquhoun	9 May 1984
223	33	"Tug of War: Part 1"	Robert Meillon	Anne Brooksbank	15 May 1984
224	34	"Tug of War: Part 2"	Robert Meillon	Sheila Sibley	16 May 1984
225	35	"Second Opinion: Part 1"	Robert Meillon	Agi Schreck	22 May 1984
226	36	"Second Opinion: Part 2"	Robert Meillon	Leon Saunders	23 May 1984
227	37	"Hot and Cold: Part 1"	Leigh Spence	David Allen	29 May 1984
228	38	"Hot and Cold: Part 2"	Leigh Spence	Peter Kinloch	30 May 1984
229	39	"Breathing Space: Part 1"	Chris Adshead	Hugh Stuckey	5 June 1984
230	40	"Breathing Space: Part 2"	Chris Adshead	Judith Colquhoun	6 June 1984
231	41	"An Axe to Grind: Part 1"	Russell Webb	Margaret Mitchell	12 June 1984
232	42	"An Axe to Grind: Part 2"	Russell Webb	Anne Brooksbank	13 June 1984
233	43	"Repairing the Damage: Part 1"	Gary Conway	Forrest Redlich	19 June 1984
234	44	"Repairing the Damage: Part 2"	Gary Conway	Forrest Redlich	20 June 1984
235	45	"Good Intentions: Part 1"	Robert Meillon	Judith Colquhoun	26 June 1984
236	46	"Good Intentions: Part 2"	Robert Meillon	Judith Colquhoun	27 June 1984
237	47	"So Close & Yet So Far: Part 1"	Leigh Spence	Sheila Sibley	3 July 1984
238	48	"So Close & Yet So Far: Part 2"	Leigh Spence	Sheila Sibley	4 July 1984
239	49	"Splitting the Difference: Part 1"	Russell Webb	Judith Colquhoun	10 July 1984
240	50	"Splitting the Difference: Part 2"	Russell Webb	Peter Kinloch	11 July 1984
241	51	"Friday the 13th: Part 1"	Robert Meillon	Leon Saunders	17 July 1984
242	52	"Friday the 13th: Part 2"	Robert Meillon	Ted Roberts	18 July 1984
243	53	"The Last Picture Show: Part 1"	Mandy Smith	Michael Aitkens	24 July 1984
244	54	"The Last Picture Show: Part 2"	Mandy Smith	Hugh Stuckey	25 July 1984
245	55	"I'll Drink to That: Part 1"	Leigh Spence	David Boutland	31 July 1984
246	56	"I'll Drink to That: Part 2"	Leigh Spence	Ted Roberts	1 August 1984
247	57	"The Hidden Trap: Part 1"	Russell Webb	Sheila Sibley	7 August 1984
248	58	"The Hidden Trap: Part 2"	Russell Webb	Peter Kinloch	8 August 1984
249	59	"Close to the Bone: Part 1"	Chris Adshead	Agi Schreck	14 August 1984
250	60	"Close to the Bone: Part 2"	Chris Adshead	Anne Brooksbank	15 August 1984
251	61	"Leader of the Pack: Part 1"	Robert Meillon	David Allen	21 August 1984
252	62	"Leader of the Pack: Part 2"	Robert Meillon	Cliff Green	22 August 1984
253	63	"Digging Up Dirt: Part 1"	Peter Maxwell	Ted Roberts	28 August 1984
254	64	"Digging Up Dirt: Part 2"	Peter Maxwell	Michael Brindley	29 August 1984
255	65	"Man's Best Friend: Part 1"	Leigh Spence	Hugh Stuckey	4 September 1984
256	66	"Man's Best Friend: Part 2"	Leigh Spence	Sheila Sibley	5 September 1984
257	67	"Taken for a Ride: Part 1"	Robert Meillon	Peter Kinloch	11 September 1984
258	68	"Taken for a Ride: Part 2"	Robert Meillon	Leon Saunders	12 September 1984
259	69	"A Fair Hearing: Part 1"	Chris Adshead	Judith Colquhoun	18 September 1984
260	70	"A Fair Hearing: Part 2"	Chris Adshead	Cliff Green	19 September 1984
261	71	"Upstaged: Part 1"	Peter Maxwell	David Allen	25 September 1984
262	72	"Upstaged: Part 2"	Peter Maxwell	David Boutland	26 September 1984
263	73	"Ships in the Night: Part 1"	Leigh Spence	Michael Aitkens & Ted Roberts	2 October 1984
264	74	"Ships in the Night: Part 2"	Leigh Spence	Forrest Redlich & Ted Roberts	3 October 1984
265	75	"The Harder They Fall: Part 1"	Leigh Spence	Sheila Sibley	9 October 1984
266	76	"The Harder They Fall: Part 2"	Leigh Spence	Bill Searle	10 October 1984
267	77	"Something Out There: Part 1"	Robert Meillon	Roger Dunn	16 October 1984
268	78	"Something Out There: Part 2"	Robert Meillon	Leon Saunders	17 October 1984
269	79	"Out of Bounds: Part 1"	Graham Rouse	Anne Brooksbank	23 October 1984
270	80	"Out of Bounds: Part 2"	Graham Rouse	Judith Colquhoun	24 October 1984
271	81	"Ritual: Part 1"	Peter Maxwell	Hugh Stuckey	30 October 1984
272	82	"Ritual: Part 2"	Peter Maxwell	David Allen	31 October 1984
273	83	"All in the Line of Duty: Part 1"	Robert Meillon	Foveaux Kirby	6 November 1984
274	84	"All in the Line of Duty: Part 2"	Robert Meillon	Peter Kinlocg	7 November 1984

=== Season 5 (1985) ===
No. overall	No. in season	Title	Directed by	Written by	Original release date
275	1	"Misconceptions: Part 1"	Russell Webb	Sheila Sibley	15 January 1985
276	2	"Misconceptions: Part 2"	Russell Webb	Russell Webb	16 January 1985
277	3	"Eighty in the Shade: Part 1"	Peter Maxwell	Leon Saunders	22 January 1985
278	4	"Eighty in the Shade: Part 2"	Peter Maxwell	David Boutland	23 January 1985
279	5	"Small Comfort: Part 1"	Graham Rouse	Hugh Stuckey	29 January 1985
280	6	"Small Comfort: Part 2"	Graham Rouse	Judith Colquhoun	30 January 1985
281	7	"Follow the Leader: Part 1"	Gary Conway	Ted Roberts	5 February 1985
282	8	"Follow the Leader: Part 2"	Gary Conway	Agi Schreck	6 February 1985
Maggie informs Bob that she will be making alternative living arrangements, which Bob takes as a personal insult. An attractive female doctor arrives at the clinic to help while Terence is away. Shirley is involved in a bad car accident, and Simon decides it's time he and Vicky took a holiday.
283	9	"Comes a Stranger: Part 1"	Robert Meillon	Ted Roberts	12 February 1985
284	10	"Comes a Stranger: Part 2"	Robert Meillon	Forrest Redlich	13 February 1985
A colourful character comes to the Valley and creates quite a stir with his potions and magic cures. Bob and Cookie believe they have stumbled across a magic cure that will make them rich. There is a state of emergency in the Valley when they get a freak rain storm and some of the local farmers have to be evacuated.
285	11	"For the Sake of the Child: Part 1"	Russell Webb	Ted Roberts	19 February 1985
286	12	"For the Sake of the Child: Part 2"	Russell Webb	Ted Roberts	20 February 1985
Brendan is left in charge of the farm while Molly visits her mother. Simon decides it's time for Shirley to update her files, putting himself in an embarrassing situation in doing so. Esme creates some mystery when she gives away her most precious belongings to her friends and a young boy's puts himself in danger to attract attention.
287	13	"On the Edge: Part 1"	Robert Meillon	Leon Saunders	26 February 1985
288	14	"On the Edge: Part 2"	Robert Meillon	Forrest Redlich	27 February 1985
A young heroin addict is found unidentified on the street and is admitted to hospital. Brendan is finding it hard to cope while Molly is away and gets some unexpected assistance.
289	15	"Swan Song: Part 1"	Russell Webb	Judy Colquhoun	5 March 1985
290	16	"Swan Song: Part 2"	Russell Webb	Peter Kinloch	6 March 1985
Terence suspects the worst when one of his elderly patients, depressed after a heart attack, says he and his wife are going away. Brendan tried his hand at blackmailing Cookie and Simon gets into a disastrous situation from which he benefits in the end.
291	17	"Smooth Talking: Part 1"	Graham Rouse	Agi Schreck	12 March 1985
292	18	"Smooth Talking: Part 2"	Graham Rouse	David Allen	13 March 1985
Matron Sloan is suspicious when she hears her arch rival from Burrigan hospital is coming to visit. Vicky takes an instant dislike to a once famous playwright who arrives in the Valley. When Brendan gets an attractive job offer he turns to Vicky and Simon for advice.
293	19	"Home Truths: Part 1"	Chris Adshead	David Boutland	19 March 1985
294	20	"Home Truths: Part 2"	Chris Adshead	Hugh Stuckey	20 March 1985
Matron Sloan forces Judy to enter a beauty contest where she shocks the judges with her speech. A housewife and a mother prove it's never too late to learn. Brendan and Vicky have a surprise for Molly when she returns. Frank arrests a respected citizen of the Valley for wife bashing.
295	21	"Seasons Come and Seasons Go: Part 1"	Robert Meillon	Sheila Sibley	26 March 1985
296	22	"Seasons Come and Seasons Go: Part 2"	Robert Meillon	Sheila Sibley	27 March 1985
Frank is furious when he can't discover who wrote the bad review about his play. Brendan organises a surprise birthday party for Molly, and Judy helps a young girl cope with the pressures of adolescence. Simon is ecstatic to discover that Vicky is pregnant.
297	23	"I'll Cry If I Want To: Part 1"	Bruce Best	Ray Harding	2 April 1985
298	24	"I'll Cry If I Want To: Part 2"	Bruce Best	Leon Saunders	3 April 1985
Terence suggests to Molly that she should go to Sydney for more tests. Johnathan puts himself in an embarrassing situation when he agrees to be a guest speaker for the literary society, and Vicky gets frustrated at being treated like an invalid because she is pregnant.
299	25	"My Way: Part 1"	Graham Rouse	Judith Colquhoun	16 April 1985
300	26	"My Way: Part 2"	Graham Rouse	Margaret Mitchell	17 April 1985
An old enemy of Molly's reappears in the valley at the same time as Simon's brother and his family arrive from the United States. While Cookie is laid up in hospital, his friends take over at the club. Molly's gentle manner with animals and children rubs off on the spoiled young girl.
301	27	"Castles in the Air: Part 1"	Robert Meillon	Agi Schreck	23 April 1985
302	28	"Castles in the Air: Part 2"	Robert Meillon	Peter Kinloch	24 April 1985
A friend of Shirley's arrives and is quite taken with Terence. When Terence and Judy return from a night out at a school reunion they find evidence of a prowler in her flat. Karen's attraction to Terence gets quite out of hand. Molly is elected to council and her first fight is against Muldoon and Funland.
303	29	"Save the Last Dance for Me: Part 1"	Peter Maxwell	Suzanne Hawley & Hugh Stuckey	30 April 1985
304	30	"Save the Last Dance for Me: Part 2"	Peter Maxwell	Ted Roberts	1 May 1985
Bob and Cookie get themselves in hot water when they buy a race horse. Retired ballet dancer Sir Adam Dormin returns to the Valley to spend what he thinks will be his last days but when he sees the potential in a young dancer, he decides to continue his teaching.
305	31	"Lost and Found: Part 1"	Bruce Best	Michael Aitkens	14 May 1985
306	32	"Lost and Found: Part 2"	Bruce Best	Leon Saunders	15 May 1985
Vicky reacts angrily to the attention Simon is paying to one of his patients. Cookie invests in some garden gnomes and is disturbed when he discovers that some of them are missing. Vicky puts herself in a dangerous situation when she helps a young boy trapped in a mine shaft.
307	33	"Coming to Terms: Part 1"	Graham Rouse	Michael Aitkens	21 May 1985
308	34	"Coming to Terms: Part 2"	Graham Rouse	Ray Harding	22 May 1985
Molly and Brendan get an attractive offer for the farm from Councillor Muldoon. Vicky suspects an outbreak of anthrax in the goats and is shocked when she hears some bad news from Molly's mother.
309	35	"Do the Right Thing: Part 1"	Peter Maxwell	Ray Harding	28 May 1985
310	36	"Do the Right Thing: Part 2"	Peter Maxwell	Forrest Redlich	29 May 1985
When the Burrigan Examiner refers to Wandin Valley as a boring place to live, war is declared between the two towns. Bob is surprised at the disinterest Molly shows towards the fight against Burrigan. Simon comes up with the idea of holding a car rally between the two towns to prove who is better. Molly gets admitted to hospital when she takes a turn for the worse.
311	37	"Molly: Part 1"	Robert Meillon	Sheila Sibley	4 June 1985
312	38	"Molly: Part 2"	Robert Meillon	Judith Colquhoun	5 June 1985
Molly is having reverse barrier nursing, not allowing her to see any of her friends. Terence tries to make it better for her putting her by an observation window so she can see them. While she is in hospital everyone is feeling useless. To help Molly – they decide to finish building Farmland for her.
313	39	"New Beginnings: Part 1"	Bruce Best and Colin Tregenza	Peter Kinloch	11 June 1985
314	40	"New Beginnings: Part 2"	Bruce Best and Colin Tregenza	Peter Kinloch	12 June 1985
An attractive French student vet arrives to assist Vicky with her practice. Bob's absence causes Matron Sloan a great deal of concern and Judy tries her hand at playing cupid. Matron Sloan helps Bob cope with his grief over Molly's death in more ways than one.
315	41	"All It Takes: Part 1"	Graham Rouse	David Boutland	18 June 1985
316	42	"All It Takes: Part 2"	Graham Rouse	Leon Saunders	19 June 1985
Simon suggests to Vicky that she should employ some help around the house. Bob believes that Maggie needs protecting, so invests in a guard dog. The hidden truth about one of the hospital's patients is leaked by Judy.
317	43	"Lest We Forget: Part 1"	Peter Maxwell	Terry Larsen	25 June 1985
318	44	"Lest We Forget: Part 2"	Peter Maxwell	Ray Harding	26 June 1985
Maggie takes a special interest in a stranger who comes for a job at the hospital. Fatso is missing and Simon and Vicky are terrified when they hear a wombat has been shot. Simon gets some unexpected training for the sleepless nights he can expect with the baby.
319	45	"Friends: Part 1"	Robert Meillon	Hugh Stuckey	2 July 1985
320	46	"Friends: Part 2"	Robert Meillon	Sheila Sibley	3 July 1985
Brendan arrives home from Adelaide with some news that shocks his friends. Shirley gets involved with setting up a half-way house for three patients. Brendan overreacts when he can't find Chloë and believes that one of the patients has taken her.
321	47	"Waste Not Want Not: Part 1"	Greg Shears	Leon Saunders	9 July 1985
322	48	"Waste Not Want Not: Part 2"	Greg Shears	Peter Kinloch	10 July 1985
Bert and Rigby live on the edge of the Valley tip. Bert is eagerly planning a trip to Surface Paradise. Both he and Rigby are saving the bus fare when their plan begins to go wrong.
323	49	"What About Me?: Part 1"	Graham Rouse	Helen Steel	16 July 1985
324	50	"What About Me?: Part 2"	Graham Rouse	Carol Williams	17 July 1985
It is Chloë's first day at kindy and she is quick to make friends with Tiffany. When Brendan is invited to the Blair house for dinner, he witnesses first hand the single mother's inability to cope with her child in a normal manner.
325	51	"Kidstuff: Part 1"	Peter Maxwell	Patricia Johnson	23 July 1985
326	52	"Kidstuff: Part 2"	Peter Maxwell	Helen Steel & Terry Larsen	24 July 1985
An old university friend arrives in the Valley with his young son; Muldoon tries to convince Terence that his aging aunt is incapable of looking after herself. Esme and Cookie believe they have found a dead body when they go fishing in the dam. Brendan is feeling the pressure of being a single parent.
327	53	"Crossed Wires: Part 1"	Greg Shears	Leon Saunders	30 July 1985
328	54	"Crossed Wires: Part 2"	Greg Shears	Leon Saunders	31 July 1985
Judy gets quite a surprise when a relative arrives in the Valley. Communication in the Valley breaks down as Esme takes control of the switchboard. Simon and Terence become rivals on the tennis court after Simon finds another partner.
329	55	"Walk Tall: Part 1"	Robert Meillon	Suzanna Hawley	6 August 1985
330	56	"Walk Tall: Part 2"	Robert Meillon	David Allen	7 August 1985
Jo has decided to stay in the Valley and live with Judy. She enrolls in Burrigan High and begins to settle down. Jo gets involved in trying to break down a group of bullies. Brendan is not coping and begins to hit the bottle, Maggie notices and asks him to take leave of absence and warns—if he refuses, she will suspend him.
331	57	"The Family Way: Part 1"	Mark Callan	Peter Kinloch	13 August 1985
332	58	"The Family Way: Part 2"	Mark Callan	David Worthington	14 August 1985
Bob hears of Brendan's irresponsible behaviour and takes charge of the situation, moving in with him and Chloë. Vicky gets some help on her rounds by a vet she used to train under. Terence's performance in a quiz show is interrupted when he's called to an emergency.
333	59	"All Things Must Change: Part 1"	Peter Maxwell	Tony Morphett	20 August 1985
334	60	"All Things Must Change: Part 2"	Peter Maxwell	Hugh Stuckey	21 August 1985
Brendan rents a beach house in Adelaide, but soon discovers he isn't the only one staying. He manages to talk openly with the stranger about the loss of Molly and the difficulty he has had coping without her. Simon and Vicky bring the twins home to overly enthusiastic Frank and Shirley.
335	61	"In a Good Cause: Part 1"	Bob Meillon & Nick Tate	Bill Searle	27 August 1985
336	62	"In a Good Cause: Part 2"	Bob Meillon & Nick Tate	Serge Lazareff	28 August 1985
Brendan surprises his friends on his return to the Valley when he tells them he is quitting nursing and selling the farm. Jo finds herself in Judy's bad books again after getting yet another pet. Brendan gets himself a job without even applying for the position.
337	63	"Another Time, Another Place: Part 1"	Graham Rouse	Terry Larsen & Carol Williams	3 September 1985
338	64	"Another Time, Another Place: Part 2"	Graham Rouse	Patricia Johnson	4 September 1985
Terence gets conned into answering medical questions on the quiz show, and is concerned that the caller has symptoms of typhoid. Brendan strikes up rapport with a visiting snake doctor from the city. Maggie has a nervous moment when she meets Russell face to face.
339	65	"Breaking Point: Part 1"	Mark Callan	Michael Aitkens	10 September 1985
340	66	"Breaking Point: Part 2"	Mark Callan	David Allen	11 September 1985
Esme shocks the Valley when she returns from Mudgee looking like a new woman. Judy hopes she'll be promoted to Deputy Matron. Brendan says goodbye to something that's been part of his life for three years. Frank investigates the selling of drugs at Burrigan High after one of the pupils has an overdose.
341	67	"Once Bitten, Twice Shy: Part 1"	Peter Maxwell	Margaret Mitchell	17 September 1985
342	68	"Once Bitten, Twice Shy: Part 2"	Peter Maxwell	Peter Kinloch	18 September 1985
The good news for Cookie is he's going to inherit some money; the bad news is his wife is arriving in town. Maggie offers Russell a place to stay which causes friction between her and Terence. Maggie also receives a marriage proposal from someone she admires and cares for.
343	69	"Work Experience: Part 1"	Robert Meillon	Leon Saunders	24 September 1985
344	70	"Work Experience: Part 2"	Robert Meillon	Ray Harding	25 September 1985
Esme forces Cookie into buying a taxi with the money he inherited. Brendan brings a ten-year-old girl with polio to the hospital after her mother deserts her. Vicky gets a once in a lifetime opportunity to work in the States, and Bob gets electrocuted and is rushed to hospital.
345	71	"Cops and Robbers: Part 1"	Graham Rouse	Dave Worthington	1 October 1985
346	72	"Cops and Robbers: Part 2"	Graham Rouse	Judith Colquhoun	2 October 1985
Frank gets some help at the station and is surprised when he finds out it is a woman. Vicky and Simon get mixed reactions over their decision to go to the States. Suspicious circumstances surround the robbing of the Valley's bank when some money isn't found, and Frank investigates the robbery.
347	73	"A Little Knowledge: Part 1"	Greg Shears	Hugh Stuckey	8 October 1985
348	74	"A Little Knowledge: Part 2"	Greg Shears	Margaret Mitchell	9 October 1985
Jeff St. John surprises the Valley when he arrives unexpectedly. Terence meets a school friend of his son's and is surprised to hear from him of his son's antics. Vicky learns that she must leave for the States in a week's time and is worried about Simon's reaction.
349	75	"New Pastures: Part 1"	Peter Maxwell	Serge Lazareff	15 October 1985
350	76	"New Pastures: Part 2"	Peter Maxwell	Patricia Johnson	16 October 1985
Vicky gets a shock when the new vet Ben arrives; he's not what she expected. Jo gets in trouble with Frank when she disobeys his orders. Frank gives Shirley the surprise of her life. Vicky says goodbye to her family and friends in the Valley in the most unconventional manner.
351	77	"Time Out: Part 1"	Robert Meillon	David Allen	22 October 1985
352	78	"Time Out: Part 2"	Robert Meillon	Anne Brooksbank	23 October 1985
Esme is not impressed when she meets the new city girl, Kelly. Ben moves into his new house only to discover he is not the only one living there. Frank is sent on a wild goose chase by a man who is set on avenging his father's death.
353	79	"Give a Dog a Bad Name: Part 1"	Graham Rouse	Helen Boyd	29 October 1985
354	80	"Give a Dog a Bad Name: Part 2"	Graham Rouse	Sheila Sibley	30 October 1985
Kelly and Ben have a few arguments over their living arrangements. Maggie arrives home to find her sister and her boyfriend have come to stay. Simon finds a new locum to take over his practice and Terence discovers he trained him.
355	81	"No Love Lost: Part 1"	Greg Shears	Dave Worthington	5 November 1985
356	82	"No Love Lost: Part 2"	Greg Shears	Howard Griffiths	6 November 1985
Kelly and Ben have a few arguments over their living arrangements. Maggie arrives home to find her sister and her boyfriend have come to stay. Simon finds a new locum to take over his practice and Terence discovers he trained him.

=== Season 6 (1986) ===
No. overall	No. in season	Title	Directed by	Written by	Original release date
357	1	"Friends for Life: Part 1"	Peter Maxwell	Serge Lazareff	14 January 1986
358	2	"Friends for Life: Part 2"	Peter Maxwell	Judith Colquhoun	15 January 1986
Kelly and Cookie think up a fund-raising idea for the club and decide on a darts competition. Matron Sloane and Shirley are set to challenge each other at the darts competition.
359	3	"Illusions: Part 1"	Robert Meillon	Bob Herbert & Patrea Smallacombe	21 January 1986
360	4	"Illusions: Part 2"	Robert Meillon	Hugh Stuckey	22 January 1986
Terence gets a surprise when his son arrives earlier than expected. Simon is worried that Shirley may be getting too involved with other people's problems.
361	5	"The Luck of the Game: Part 1"	Riccardo Pellizzeri	Ray Harding	28 January 1986
362	6	"The Luck of the Game: Part 2"	Riccardo Pellizzeri	David Allen	29 January 1986
Terence has the Valley wondering why he's making frequent visits to Burrigan. Kelly arranges for a journalist friend from Sydney to visit Wandin Valley to write a review on the club.
363	7	"The Time of Your Life: Part 1"	Vince Martin	Sheila Sibley	4 February 1986
364	8	"The Time of Your Life: Part 2"	Vince Martin	Dave Worthington	5 February 1986
The Matron has hospital staff and friends worried when she becomes forgetful and doesn't turn up for work. Judy tries to arrange a romantic dinner with Ben Green. Terence worries about C.K's attitude. Terence takes C.K on a camping trip. Meanwhile, Maggie Sloane has a hard time coming to grips with the changes in her life.
365	9	"Good Mates: Part 1"	Peter Maxwell	Terry Larsen	11 February 1986
366	10	"Good Mates: Part 2"	Peter Maxwell	Judith Colquhoun	12 February 1986
Brendan arranges an evening out with Simon and everyone worries when the pair are late getting back. Kelly is surprised to hear that Judy Loveday believes she and Ben are going out together. Simon begins to wonder if he'll be missed by the locals when he leaves to join Vicky and the twins. Simon's friends gather to give hime a fond farewell.
367	11	"Out of the Blue: Part 1"	Greg Shears	Patricia Johnson	18 February 1986
368	12	"Out of the Blue: Part 2"	Greg Shears	Roger Dunn	19 February 1986
Kelly is shocked when her old boyfriend arrives back on the scene. Frank is suspicious when he sees Shirley with another man and Bob and Cookie invent a mechanical scarecrow. A young girl's promising future is shattered after further tests prove she has a brain disorder.
369	13	"The Will to Win: Part 1"	Leigh Spence	Helen Boyd	25 February 1986
370	14	"The Will to Win: Part 2"	Leigh Spence	Anne Brooksbank	26 February 1986
Kelly is assigned to look after the animals when Ben is admitted to hospital with chicken pox. Bob and Cookie are desperately trying to gather votes to be elected on the Rotex Committee.
371	15	"Fighting Back: Part 1"	Steve Martin	Shane Brennan	4 March 1986
372	16	"Fighting Back: Part 2"	Steve Martin	David Allen	5 March 1986
Tension between Bob and Cookie gets to boiling point when Cookie moves out of Bob's house. Kelly is thrilled when she receives an order for 50 litres of home-made ice cream. Cookie is furious when Bob runs into Esme in the taxi and refuses to pay for damages.
373	17	"Calm Before the Storm: Part 1"	Peter Maxwell	Dave Worthington	11 March 1986
374	18	"Calm Before the Storm: Part 2"	Peter Maxwell	Forrest Redlich	12 March 1986
Cookie seems like he's on the verge of having a nervous breakdown. Cookie has a horrific car accident and the hospital staff fight to save his life.
375	19	"Sink or Swim: Part 1"	Leigh Spence	Howard Griffiths	18 March 1986
376	20	"Sink or Swim: Part 2"	Leigh Spence	Hugh Stuckey	19 March 1986
Bob thinks of a fund-raising idea to help Cookie with his money problems. It's Wandin Valley versus Burrigan in the dance competition, with Frank and Shirley desperate to win.
377	21	"Covering Up: Part 1"	Greg Shears	Judith Colquhoun	25 March 1986
378	22	"Covering Up: Part 2"	Greg Shears	Sheila Sibley	26 March 1986
Shirley has a nervous first night on help line when the caller is a ten-year-old boy afraid of being left alone. Ben and Kelly are a bit worried that their new loo is going to look a bit outrageous.
379	23	"A Matter of Chance: Part 1"	Peter Maxwell	Helen Boyd	1 April 1986
380	24	"A Matter of Chance: Part 2"	Peter Maxwell	Bevan Lee	2 April 1986
Shirley has a nervous first night on the help line when the caller is a ten-year-old boy afraid of being left alone. Ben and Kelly are a bit worried that their new loo is going to look a bit outrageous. Mr Muldoon tries to blackmail Kelly into a partnership with her ice-cream business.
381	25	"Barriers: Part 1"	Riccardo Pellizzeri	Carol Williams	8 April 1986
382	26	"Barriers: Part 2"	Riccardo Pellizzeri	Bill Searle	9 April 1986
Kelly writes a light hearted article about the residents of Wandin Valley. Brendan is upset when he hears that Sarah Anderson is leaving the valley to take on a full-time teaching position elsewhere.
383	27	"One for the Road: Part 1"	Chris Adshead	Steven Measday	15 April 1986
384	28	"One for the Road: Part 2"	Chris Adshead	Patricia Johnson	16 April 1986
Judy is put in an embarrassing situation when she forgets the combination of the hospital safe. Kelly's negative article on Dr. Wood causes him to resign and leaves Kelly very unpopular amongst the locals.
385	29	"Track Record: Part 1"	Robert Meillon	Suzanne Hawley	22 April 1986
386	30	"Track Record: Part 2"	Robert Meillon	Terry Larsen	23 April 1986
Judy advertises for a new flatmate and finds Mr. Perfect. Cookie relies on Esme's dreams for a winner in the Burrigan Cup.
387	31	"Race Greed and Colour: Part 1"	Peter Maxwell	Shane Brennan	29 April 1986
388	32	"Race Greed and Colour: Part 2"	Peter Maxwell	Judith Colquhoun	30 April 1986
When a horse trainer is suspended for drugging her race horse, Kelly sets out to prove her innocence. Kelly is warned by Austin Matthews to stay out of his affairs, or she could end up in serious trouble.
389	33	"Glue Factory: Part 1"	Vince Martin	Sheila Sibley	6 May 1986
390	34	"Glue Factory: Part 2"	Vince Martin	Tony Morphett	7 May 1986
Jo gets a job with Bob Hatfield so she can help Judy save some money for the house she wants to buy. Kelly uncovers some interesting facts on the boarding house.
391	35	"Fighting Chance: Part 1"	Leigh Spence	Hugh Stuckey	13 May 1986
392	36	"Fighting Chance: Part 2"	Leigh Spence	Ray Harding	14 May 1986
Terence is thrilled when he finally finds a doctor to replace Simon. Jo Loveday makes a decision to stay in Wandin Valley.
393	37	"In Love and War: Part 1"	Robert Meillon	Carol Williams	20 May 1986
394	38	"In Love and War: Part 2"	Robert Meillon	Dave Worthington	21 May 1986
Ben is confused by all the attention he's getting from the single women in the valley. Frank shoots a man to protect a mother and her children.
395	39	"Duty Bound: Part 1"	Peter Maxwell	Patricia Johnson	27 May 1986
396	40	"Duty Bound: Part 2"	Peter Maxwell	David Allen	28 May 1986
Shirley is concerned when Frank refuses to discuss a shooting. Frank is unsure of his future in the force when there is an inquiry into the details of the shooting.
397	41	"Black Sheep: Part 1"	Riccardo Pellizzeri	Howard Griffiths	3 June 1986
398	42	"Black Sheep: Part 2"	Riccardo Pellizzeri	Terry Larsen	4 June 1986
Shirley asks Terence for advice when her relationship with Frank worsens. Frank gets a visit from the police psychologist when he admits he needs help.
399	43	"Fire: Part 1"	Leigh Spence	Hugh Stuckey	10 June 1986
400	44	"Fire: Part 2"	Leigh Spence	Forrest Redlich	11 June 1986
Bob is angry when no-one wants to be a volunteer fire fighter. A fire threatens to sweep through Wandin Valley.
401	43	"From the Ashes: Part 1"	Chris Adshead	Stephen Measday	17 June 1986
402	44	"From the Ashes: Part 2"	Chris Adshead	Tim Pye	18 June 1986
Ben and Jo care for the animals that were injured in the fire. The valley regulars put on a benefit concert for the fire victims.
403	47	"Unsung Lullaby: Part 1"	Peter Andrikidis	Bill Searle	24 June 1986
404	48	"Unsung Lullaby: Part 2"	Peter Andrikidis	Shane Brennan & Jenny Sharp	25 June 1986
Shirley and Frank have an unexpected visit form Vicky and the twins. Jealousy raises its ugly head when Jo Loveday vies for Peter Manning's affection. Vicky is put in a terrifying situation when Charlotte is abducted by a distressed young woman.
405	49	"The Deep End: Part 1"	Robert Meillon	Dave Worthington	1 July 1986
406	50	"The Deep End: Part 2"	Robert Meillon	Patrea Smallacombe	2 July 1986
Peter Manning's sister tries for the nursing position at the hospital. Alex impresses hospital staff when she performs her first operation. Judy and Daley enter a television dating show. Secrecy surrounds Bob and Terrence's entry for the bathtub derby.
407	51	"Playing the Game: Part 1"	Leigh Spence	Patrea Smallacombe	8 July 1986
408	52	"Playing the Game: Part 2"	Leigh Spence	Judith Colquhoun	9 July 1986
Judy tries to impress her partner on the Gold Coast but makes a mess of things. Judy returns from the Gold Coast with thoughts of travelling overseas.
409	53	"Caterpillars & Butterflies: Part 1"	Robert Meillon	David Allen	15 July 1986
410	54	"Caterpillars & Butterflies: Part 2"	Robert Meillon	David Boutland	16 July 1986
Ben agrees to go to a rock concert with Donna but mysterious things happen along the way. Jo convinces Judy that she should travel and see the world.
411	55	"Listen to the Children: Part 1"	Peter Maxwell	Stephen Measday	22 July 1986
412	56	"Listen to the Children: Part 2"	Peter Maxwell	Leon Saunders	22 July 1986
Shirley organises a petition against the impending army base in Wandin Valley. The prime minister makes a special appearance at a rock concert to show his support to the kids of Burrigan High on their stand against a nuclear base in the Valley.
413	57	"Ghosts: Part 1"	Chris Adshead	Judith Colquhoun	29 July 1986
414	58	"Ghosts: Part 2"	Chris Adshead	Patrea Smallacombe	30 July 1986
Jo feels that Frank is becoming over protective when he questions her every move. Alex gets scared when her furniture appears to move and she hears strange noises in the house.
415	59	"Let the Sun Shine In: Part 1"	Leigh Spence	Bill Searle	5 August 1986
416	60	"Let the Sun Shine In: Part 2"	Leigh Spence	Forrest Redlich	6 August 1986
417	61	"Let the Sun Shine In: Part 3"	Peter Maxwell	Carol Williams	12 August 1986
418	62	"Let the Sun Shine In: Part 4"	Peter Maxwell	Shane Brennan	13 August 1986
419	63	"Let the Sun Shine In: Part 5"	Robert Meillon	Dave Worthington	19 August 1986
420	64	"Let the Sun Shine In: Part 6"	Robert Meillon	Forrest Redlich	20 August 1986
Parts 1 and 2: Jo Loveday gets her wires crossed and tells everyone that Shirley is pregnant. Terence goes on a fishing weekend and finds an abused little girl who lives in the bush. Friends caution Terence on his involvement with Bethany and suggest she should be placed in an institution rather than remain in his care. Parts 3 and 4: Terence sees C.K. while in Sydney with Bethany, but the relationship becomes very strained. Alex agrees to have a house warming party under the proviso that Donna organise it. Parts 5 and 6: Terrence is in the firing line when town gossip questions his motives toward Bethany. Terence comes to terms with losing Bethany by turning to liquor.
421	65	"Past Imperfect: Part 1"	Greg Shears	Margaret Mitchell	26 August 1986
422	66	"Past Imperfect: Part 2"	Greg Shears	Forrest Redlich	27 August 1986
Donna sets out to save the town hall when she hears that the council is going to build a shopping centre. Alex puts her medical opinions aside when an old man explains why he should be left alone with his suffering.
423	67	"Day After Day: Part 1"	Leigh Spence	Judith Colquhoun	2 September 1986
424	68	"Day After Day: Part 2"	Leigh Spence	Judith Colquhoun	3 September 1986
Jo Loveday interviews the patients in the Muldoon Wing for a school movie project. Peter gets quite a surprise when Alex takes him out on a date. Donna conspires with the Muldoon patients to keep a secret from Matron Sloan.
425	69	"Trouble Spots: Part 1"	Robert Meillon	Margaret Mitchell	9 September 1986
426	70	"Trouble Spots: Part 2"	Robert Meillon	David Allen	10 September 1986
Alex Fraser embarrasses Peter when she uses him as a medical guinea pig for nurses' training. A young boy who feels he's an outcast from his school mates tries to kill himself.
427	71	"It Isn't Catching Is It?: Part 1"	Chris Adshead	Tony Morphett	16 September 1986
428	72	"It Isn't Catching Is It?: Part 2"	Chris Adshead	David Boutland	17 September 1986
A shy man with facial deformities is admitted to hospital for observation. Terrence worries that Alex is forgetting one of his patient's feelings when she asks to do further studies on his condition.
429	73	"The Price You Pay: Part 1"	Greg Shears	Dave Worthington & Patrea Smallacombe	23 September 1986
430	74	"The Price You Pay: Part 2"	Greg Shears	Shane Brennan & Forrest Redlich	24 September 1986
Shirley refuses to move back home and accepts an offer to live with Matron Sloan. Practical realities of using a surrogate mother cause nightmares for the people involved.
431	75	"A Question of Attitude: Part 1"	Mike Smith	Bill Searle	30 September 1986
432	76	"A Question of Attitude: Part 2"	Mike Smith	Carol Williams	1 October 1986
Terence is lost for words when his ex-wife and son arrive at the clinic without warning. C.K. tries devious means to bring Terence and Rowena together.
433	77	"The Things You Learn: Part 1"	Robert Meillon	Margaret Mitchell	7 October 1986
434	78	"The Things You Learn: Part 2"	Robert Meillon	Leon Saunders	8 October 1986
When Rowena declares she is broke C.K. decides to quit school and join the workforce. Terence causes an argument with Rowena when he blames her for C.K. wanting to leave school.
435	79	"Playing House: Part 1"	Peter Maxwell	Patricia Johnston & Patrea Smallacombe	14 October 1986
436	80	"Playing House: Part 2"	Peter Maxwell	Patrea Smallacombe	15 October 1986
Alex worries about a young couple's ability to cope with parenthood. The strain of nursing her newborn baby takes its toll on a young mother.
437	81	"Early Stages: Part 1"	Chris Adshead	Betty Quin	21 October 1986
438	82	"Early Stages: Part 2"	Chris Adshead	Stephen Measday	22 October 1986
Esme is excited at the prospect of meeting an old friend when she suspects he's going to propose marriage. The Wandin Valley residents put on a hilarious performance of "A Midsummers Night Dream" as it's never been seen before.
439	83	"Growing Pains: Part 1"	Leigh Spence	Dave Worthington	28 October 1986
440	84	"Growing Pains: Part 2"	Leigh Spence	Graeme Koetsveld	29 October 1986
A woman who lives for her daughter's success pays the price when she is admitted to hospital suffering from exhaustion and malnutrition. Donna and Ben's curiosity gets the better of them when a mysterious parcel arrives for Peter.
441	85	"Out of Proportion: Part 1"	Robert Meillon	Carol Williams	4 November 1986
442	86	"Out of Proportion: Part 2"	Robert Meillon	Dave Allen	5 November 1986
A student teacher, conscious of her size, becomes the recipient of some cruel jokes by Peter Manning's pupils. Burrigan High prepare for a school debate against their arch rivals at Foxwood.

=== Season 7 (1987) ===
No. overall	No. in season	Title	Directed by	Written by	Original release date
443	1	"Hidden Extras: Part 1"	Peter Maxwell	Bill Searle	12 January 1987
444	2	"Hidden Extras: Part 2"	Peter Maxwell	Tim Pye	13 January 1987
A young married couple move into a house on a new estate and Bob becomes very ill after doing some work at their house. Tension develops between Alex and Matron Sloan as they try to work out Bob's illness with Terence away.
445	3	"Rocking the Boat: Part 1"	Vince Martin	Hugh Stuckey & Bill Searle	19 January 1987
446	4	"Rocking the Boat: Part 2"	Vince Martin	Leon Saunders	20 January 1987
Jo is saddened to learn her mother has moved away and left no forwarding address. Donna and Jo travel to Rottnest Island and see the native Quokka firsthand.
447	5	"Bitter Sweet: Part 1"	Peter Andrikidis	Shane Brennan	26 January 1987
448	6	"Bitter Sweet: Part 2"	Peter Andrikidis	Dave Worthington	27 January 1987
Frank and Shirley travel to the United States to see Vicky, Simon and the twins. Ben is victimised by irate farmers when he announces that the whole milk supply of the Valley will have to be dumped.
449	7	"One With the Lot: Part 1"	Robert Meillon	Tony Morphett	2 February 1987
450	8	"One With the Lot: Part 2"	Robert Meillon	Forrest Redlich	3 February 1987
The wife of a roadhouse owner has a late pregnancy with a fifty-fifty chance that the child will be malformed. Kenny Mitchell is employed at the roadhouse behind the counter, with his special being a hamburger with the lot.
451	9	"Caught in the Act: Part 1"	Riccardo Pellizzeri	Patrea Smallacombe & Tom Mitchell	9 February 1987
452	10	"Caught in the Act: Part 2"	Riccardo Pellizzeri	Judith Colquhoun	10 February 1987
There's a burglar on the loose in Wandin Valley. Esme is among the victims, and Sally is finding it a difficult case to solve. Laura breaks down and tells her mother why she is so upset about the Major's proposal.
453	11	"No Place for a Lady: Part 1"	Leigh Spence	Sheila Sibley	16 February 1987
454	12	"No Place for a Lady: Part 2"	Leigh Spence	N/A	17 February 1987
Wandin Valley battens down the hatches and prepares for Big Jules's annual visit. Sally, sick of being treated as a secretary instead of a policewoman, files an official complaint against Frank.
455	12	"Tall in the Saddle: Part 1"	Unknown	Betty Quinn	23 February 1987
456	14	"Tall in the Saddle: Part 2"	Unknown	Bill Searle	24 February 1987
Shirley convinces Jo to audition for a television commercial. Jo prepares to make her television debut while Frank acts the nervous "stage mother".
457	15	"Times are a Changing: Part 1"	Riccardo Pellizzeri	David Boutland	2 March 1987
458	16	"Times are a Changing: Part 2"	Riccardo Pellizzeri	Stephen Measday & Tim Pye	3 March 1987
When the school principal decides to bring some "good old-fashioned discipline" back to Burrigan High, the students rebel and Jo organises a protest. Jo is elected president of the new student council, and Alex learns that Andrew has a drug problem.
459	17	"Foul Play: Part 1"	Peter Maxwell	Judith Colquhoun	9 March 1987
460	18	"Foul Play: Part 2"	Peter Maxwell	Hugh Stuckey	10 March 1987
Jo is booked to do a TV commercial for fresh chickens but her excitement turns to horror when she sees the conditions at the farm. There is an outbreak of Asian flu in the Valley and it looks as if many small poultry farmers are going to lose everything.
461	19	"Hit and Run: Part 1"	Mike Smith	Andrew Kennedy	16 March 1987
462	20	"Hit and Run: Part 2"	Mike Smith	Carol Williams	17 March 1987
Peter takes pity on a teenage runaway and lets him stay at Camelot, much to Ben and Donna's dismay. Peter is devastated when he realises that Stewart was just stringing him along.
463	21	"Odds On: Part 1"	Robert Meillon	Graeme Koetsveld	23 March 1987
464	22	"Odds On: Part 2"	Robert Meillon	Shane Brennan	24 March 1987
Esme is bitten by the gambling bug when Cookie installs a new poker machine in the club. Peter's life hangs in the balance when he suffers a severe allergic reaction.
465	23	"Lost for Words: Part 1"	Peter Maxwell	Betty Quin	30 March 1987
466	24	"Lost for Words: Part 2"	Peter Maxwell	Judith Colquhoun	31 March 1987
Peter and Alex organise a romantic weekend away in Sydney but it does not go according to plan. Donna is shattered when she learns that Matt has bone cancer.
467	25	"Creative Play: Part 1"	Chris Adshead	Dave Worthington	6 April 1987
468	26	"Creative Play: Part 2"	Chris Adshead	Forrest Redlich	7 April 1987
Donna finds her nursing skills challenged and ends up resigning after a battle with a middle-age valium addict. When Peter catches Penny and George in Alex's house, they decide to get back at him with a 'magic' potion.
469	27	"Outsiders: Part 1"	Leigh Spence	Craig Wilkins	13 April 1987
470	28	"Outsiders: Part 2"	Leigh Spence	Alister Webb	14 April 1987
Jo and Ben visit a rundown farm and suspect something is amiss. Hilda Arrowsmith arrives at Wandin Valley Hospital – she's the new acting matron!
471	29	"A Nice Girl Like You: Part 1"	Robert Meillon	Patrea Smallacombe	20 April 1987
472	30	"A Nice Girl Like You: Part 2"	Robert Meillon	Tom Mitchell	21 April 1987
Adam Campbell takes a fancy to Jo and invites her to a party at his house. After they get into an accident, leaving Jo in a coma with possible brain damage, Frank is determined to find out who is to blame.
473	31	"Home and Away: Part 1"	Chris Adshead	David Allen	27 April 1987
474	32	"Home and Away: Part 2"	Chris Adshead	Judith Colquhoun	28 April 1987
Alex suspects a case of child abuse. Esme is jealous when Cookie shows interest in the matron. Jo checks out of hospital after her recovery and helps reunite a family.
475	33	"Love Story: Part 1"	Richard Sarell	Carol Williams	4 May 1987
476	34	"Love Story: Part 2"	Richard Sarell	David Boutland	5 May 1987
Peter tries to find the right moment to pop the question to Alex, but she's too busy battling a case of hay fever. Terence blows his stack when a patient's life is threatened due to Matron Arrowsmith's scheming.
477	35	"Best Laid Plans: Part 1"	Leigh Spence	David Phillips	11 May 1987
478	36	"Best Laid Plans: Part 2"	Leigh Spence	Margaret Mitchell	12 May 1987
The Wandin Valley residents band together to prevent the closure of the hospital. Matron Sloan arrives back in Wandin Valley with the hope of saving the hospital.
479	37	"My Brother's Keeper: Part 1"	Robert Meillon	Dave Worthington	18 May 1987
480	38	"My Brother's Keeper: Part 2"	Robert Meillon	Betty Quin	19 May 1987
Jo's school friend Fiona is fed up of having to look after her little brother Jimmy. Fiona runs to Jo and the Gilroys for comfort when her mother turns on her and blames her for Jimmy's death.
481	39	"Book By It's Cover: Part 1"	Viktors Ritelis	Caroline Stanton	25 May 1987
482	40	"Book By It's Cover: Part 2"	Viktors Ritelis	Shane Brennan	26 May 1987
When Peter allows his students to choose a book for their open book review, their choice causes him nothing but trouble. A diabetic boy bluffs his way into hospital to escape his overprotective mother.
483	41	"The Lie of the Land: Part 1"	Peter Maxwell	Graeme Koetsveld	1 June 1987
484	42	"The Lie of the Land: Part 2"	Peter Maxwell	Tony Morphett	2 June 1987
The new ranger, Cathy Hayden, has trouble coping with the attitudes of the locals and her willful grandfather. Peter goes to work on the Hayden farm and Alex begins to worry about the man she's going to marry.
485	43	"Ghost of a Chance: Part 1"	Mike Smith	Stephen Measday	8 June 1987
486	44	"Ghost of a Chance: Part 2"	Mike Smith	Forrest Redlich	9 June 1987
Alex picks up a young hitch-hiker and blames herself when the girl dies after being in a road accident. Alex gets too involved in the case of a newborn baby who is going through heroin withdrawal.
487	45	"The Right Mix: Part 1"	Bob Meillon	David Allen	15 June 1987
488	46	"The Right Mix: Part 2"	Bob Meillon	Tim Pye	16 June 1987
A hard-headed journalist comes to the Valley to interview Cathy for a story on a "day in the life of a ranger". Alex and Peter's relationship is in trouble and the arrival of Peter's old mentor doesn't help matters.
489	47	"Keep on Truckin': Part 1"	Leigh Spence	Margaret Mitchell	22 June 1987
490	48	"Keep on Truckin': Part 2"	Leigh Spence	David Boutland	23 June 1987
Alex waits for Peter to make up his mind about Walter Hopwood's job offer. Peter tells Alex of his decision, and now it's time for Alex to do some thinking.
491	49	"Nobody's Perfect: Part 1"	Viktors Ritelis	Carol Williams	29 June 1987
492	50	"Nobody's Perfect: Part 2"	Viktors Ritelis	Bill Searle	30 June 1987
Donna's Aunt Sally comes to visit and Donna and Cathy see a chance to do a little matchmaking. Jack and Sally find they've got a lot in common and Jo becomes the star of a Japanese shampoo commercial.
493	51	"Things of Value: Part 1"	Mike Smith	Dave Worthington	6 July 1987
494	52	"Things of Value: Part 2"	Mike Smith	Judith Colquhoun	7 July 1987
Frank has a special present in mind for his and Shirley's fifth wedding anniversary. Jo tries to do something special for the Gilroys and ends up getting lectured instead.
495	53	"Walking on Air: Part 1"	Peter Maxwell	David Boutland	13 July 1987
496	54	"Walking on Air: Part 2"	Peter Maxwell	Shane Brennan & Tim Pye	14 July 1987
497	55	"Walking on Air: Part 3"	Peter Andrikidis	Graeme Koetsveld	20 July 1987
498	56	"Walking on Air: Part 4"	Peter Andrikidis	David Allen	21 July 1987
Parts 1 & 2: Kenny Mitchell starts work at the hospital and befriends a young girl with a crippling disease. Bob and Cookie advertise for a housemate and are delighted with the response. Parts 3 & 4: Terence goes on a health kick, but Alex is concerned that he's overdoing it. Kenny starts making plans for his future with Samantha.
499	57	"Carnival is Over: Part 1"	Robert Meillom	Dave Worthington	27 July 1987
500	58	"Carnival is Over: Part 2"	Robert Meillom	N/A	28 July 1987
Cookie meets up with a couple of old circus performers and their sick lion. Two circus clowns decide to do one last show for the children of Wandin Valley Hospital.
501	59	"Birds of Prey: Part 1"	Vince Martin	David Phillips	3 August 1987
502	60	"Birds of Prey: Part 2"	Vince Martin	Carol Williams	4 August 1987
The local farmers are up in arms over plans to release a wedgetail eagle in the national park. It's Donna to the rescue when a farmer threatens the life of an innocent animal.
503	61	"Intensive Care: Part 1"	Leigh Spence	Michael Brindley	10 August 1987
504	62	"Intensive Care: Part 2"	Leigh Spence	Tim Pye	11 August 1987
Terence transfers a brain dead girl to Wandin Valley Hospital in the hope that her father will agree to turn off the life support system. A father is unable to come to terms with the fact that his daughter is in an irreversible coma.
505	63	"Mozart Rules: Part 1"	Viktors Ritelis	Jenny Sharp	17 August 1987
506	64	"Mozart Rules: Part 2"	Viktors Ritelis	Caroline Stanton	18 August 1987
Donna organizes a surprise party for Ben to celebrate Mozart's birthday. A serious car accident has tragic consequences for the folk of Wandin Valley.
507	65	"Picking Up the Pieces: Part 1"	Peter Maxwell	Margaret Mitchell	24 August 1987
508	66	"Picking Up the Pieces: Part 2"	Peter Maxwell	Chris Roache & Bill Searle	25 August 1987
Frank Gilroy senses that there was more to the accident than meets the eye. Penny refuses to accept that her father is dead and the town pulls together for a fund raising dance-a-thon.
509	67	"Down to Earth: Part 1"	Robert Meillon	Tony Morphett	31 August 1987
510	68	"Down to Earth: Part 2"	Robert Meillon	Forrest Redlich	1 September 1987
Terence puts his vineyard up for sale and ends up regretting his actions. Jo and Frank are at loggerheads because the seargent is refusing to let Jo anywhere near her new car.
511	69	"Not Enough Cooks: Part 1"	Leigh Spence	David Allen	7 September 1987
512	70	"Not Enough Cooks: Part 2"	Leigh Spence	Margaret Mitchell	8 September 1987
A selfish, ageing model checks into the hospital and learns a few lessons about life from Jo. Councillor Muldoon causes even more problems for the hospital when he tries his hand at industrial relations.
513	71	"Someone to Listen: Part 1"	Viktors Ritelis	Dave Worthington	14 September 1987
514	72	"Someone to Listen: Part 2"	Viktors Ritelis	Judith Colquhoun	15 September 1987
A mother suspects that the problems she's having with her teenage son could be caused by more than just a generation gap. Terence tries to help a mentally ill boy but his efforts are in vain.
515	73	"A Different Breed: Part 1"	Mike Smith	David Phillips	21 September 1987
516	74	"A Different Breed: Part 2"	Mike Smith	Carol Williams	22 September 1987
The local farmers are angry about the abundance of wild pigs in the national park and they blame Cathy for the damage to their crops. Jack Hayden takes a turn for the worse in hospital and Cathy finally learns the truth about his illness.
517	75	"Going for Broke: Part 1"	Vince Martin	Michael Brindley	28 September 1987
518	76	"Going for Broke: Part 2"	Vince Martin	Shane Brennan	29 September 1987
A new nurse has an unusual introduction to Wandin Valley. Jack, realising he has little time left, decides to take care of some unfinished business.
519	77	"What's Love Got To Do With It : Part 1"	Robert Meillon	David Boutland	5 October 1987
520	78	"What's Love Got To Do With It : Part 2"	Robert Meillon	N/A	6 October 1987
A couple of thieves cause trouble for Frank. Cathy arranges a reunion between Jack and his long lost son. Penny is having trouble coping with her new life and Alex is having problems of her own adjusting to parenthood.
521	79	"Labour of Love: Part 1"	Peter Maxwell	Judith Colquhoun	12 October 1987
522	80	"Labour of Love: Part 2"	Peter Maxwell	Dave Worthington	13 October 1987
A hot shot city trained nursing sister arrives in Wandin Valley. Esme is admitted to hospital and is convinced that she is going to die.
523	81	"Playing Possum: Part 1"	Peter Andrikidis	Graeme Koetsveld	19 October 1987
524	82	"Playing Possum: Part 2"	Peter Andrikidis	David Allen	20 October 1987
Cathy can't believe her luck when she hires a new farmhand, but she is in for a few surprises. Danno, Cathy's new farmhand, goes missing, and Shirley's mysterious caller pays a visit.
525	83	"The Last Straw: Part 1"	Leigh Spence	Tom Mitchell	26 October 1987
526	84	"The Last Straw: Part 2"	Leigh Spence	Bill Searle	27 October 1987
A farmer and his wife struggle to come to terms with losing their farm. A man desperate to save his farm resorts to using a shotgun. Bob and Cookie fix Jo up with a "hot" date.
527	85	"All in the Game: Part 1"	Mike Smith	Jenny Sharp	2 November 1987
528	86	"All in the Game: Part 2"	Mike Smith	Tim Pye	3 November 1987
Football fever grips Wandin Valley when the "Wombats" take on Widjeera. Michael tries out for the team, much to Matron Sloan's disgust. Shirley feels the burden of being a policeman's wife and having her husband on the job 24 hours a day.
529	87	"Licensed to Kill: Part 1"	Robert Meillon	David Phillips	9 November 1987
530	88	"Licensed to Kill: Part 2"	Robert Meillon	Forrest Redlich	10 November 1987
531	89	"Licensed to Kill: Part 3"	Peter Maxwell	David Boutland	16 November 1987
532	90	"Licensed to Kill: Part 4"	Peter Maxwell	Judith Colquhoun	17 November 1987
Parts 1 & 2: Terence is named as Wandin Valley's Citizen of the Year. Michael's offer to help Jo study for her driving test has unexpected consequences. Tempers flare over Cathy Hayden's decision to cancel the annual shoot. Meanwhile, narrow-minded gossips have a field day with Jo and Michael. Parts 3 & 4: Wandin Valley is invaded by gun-toting hunters as the annual duck season gets underway. A shooting accident tears a family apart. Penny tries a little matchmaking between her two favourite doctors.

=== Season 8 (1988) ===
No. overall	No. in season	Title	Directed by	Written by	Original release date
533	1	"A Clean Slate: Part 1"	Leigh Spence	Dave Worthington	18 January 1988
534	2	"A Clean Slate: Part 2"	Leigh Spence	Tony Morphett	19 January 1988
An itinerant farm labourer's reluctance to settle down is putting a strain on his marriage and prompting his wife to hit the bottle. The locals have conflicting views on how best to put Lover's Gully to good use. Michael helps Pam Allen forget her problems but lands himself in trouble with her husband and receives a black eye.
535	3	"Mixed Blessings: Part 1"	Viktors Ritelis	Shane Brennan & Tim Pye	25 January 1988
536	4	"Mixed Blessings: Part 2"	Viktors Ritelis	David Allen & Stephen Measday	26 January 1988
When Leanne learns that she is pregnant, her husband, Dave, isn't exactly overjoyed. They already have one child with Down's Syndrome and Dave is fearful they could end up with another. Terence asks Alex to accompany him to a medical seminar in Canberra. Christopher feels rejected when he overhears his parents talking about a new baby.
537	5	"Learning the Lessons: Part 1"	Robert Meillon	Tom Mitchell	1 February 1988
538	6	"Learning the Lessons: Part 2"	Robert Meillon	Margaret Mitchell	2 February 1988
Jo has a hard time dealing with an over-zealous rookie cop. Terence and Alex return from Canberra very much in love. A mother is shattered when her son's simple case of measles develops into being potentially brain damaging. The discovery of white powder bags leads the Valley relief policeman to believe that the big time drug dealers are moving in.
539	7	"Revelations: Part 1"	Bill Hughes	Graeme Koetsveld	8 February 1988
540	8	"Revelations: Part 2"	Bill Hughes	Carol Williams	9 February 1988
541	9	"Revelations: Part 3"	Leigh Spence	Tony Morphett	15 February 1988
542	10	"Revelations: Part 4"	Leigh Spence	David Boutland	16 February 1988
Parts 1 & 2: When Terence's daughter comes to the Valley to spend time with her father, her arrival places a strain on Terence and Alex's relationship. Ben is captivated by Millie Alcott, an innocent girl who has grown up out of touch with the modern world. Alex finds herself overshadowed by Terence's daughter and her adventure-packed life. Parts 3 & 4: Alex is torn between her professional ethics and her feelings for Terence and cannot decide whether or not to tell him that his daughter has a drug problem. A “sweet” old lady injures herself in the National Park and decides to sue for millions in damages. Terence decides to help his daughter to fight her problems – whether she wants his help or not.
543	11	"Tomorrow's News: Part 1"	Viktors Ritelis	Dave Worthington	22 February 1988
544	12	"Tomorrow's News: Part 2"	Viktors Ritelis	Shane Brennan	23 February 1988
A father is displeased when his son befriends a handicapped person in hospital. A hard-nosed television journalist arrives in the Valley to do a piece on Frank, but has some trouble finding an exciting angle for the story. Terence asks Alex to marry him. A full-scale search is organised when two patients go missing from the hospital. Alex accepts Terence's proposal.
545	13	"Love Hurts: Part 1"	Robert Meillon	Grant Fraser & Tom Mitchell	29 February 1988
546	14	"Love Hurts: Part 2"	Robert Meillon	Jennifer Sharp	1 March 1988
Jo's friend Darren is having more problems than usual with his father. Ron owns a junkyard and is trying to force his son to leave school in order to help with the business. Alex and Terence announce their engagement and the pressure is on them to set a date for the big day. A family is torn apart when an undiagnosed medical condition causes a normally loving father to become violent.
547	15	"Give Me a Break: Part 1"	Peter Andrikidis	David Allen	7 March 1988
548	16	"Give Me a Break: Part 2"	Peter Andrikidis	David Phillips	8 March 1988
Jo and Cathy think they've discovered a Yowie in the National Park but what they really find is an escaped murderer who's been hiding out for more than twenty years. The club gets a pool table and the competition is on to see who will represent Wandin Valley against Burrigan Slim. Ben has an accident with an uncontrollable horse.
549	17	"In Sickness & In Health: Part 1"	Leigh Spence	Carol Williams	14 March 1988
550	18	"In Sickness & In Health: Part 2"	Leigh Spence	Judith Colquhoun	15 March 1988
There are pre-wedding jitters all around as the big day draws near. Alex's parents arrive in the Valley and her father immediately takes over, causing Alex and Terence to have a blazing row. Ben's locum arrives and Cathy is far from pleased to meet up with Matt Tyler again. Jo asks Michael to the drive-in. The wedding arrives and Frank's precise schedule falls apart when Matt enlists his help to unbox his car, leaving Alex waiting at the church.
551	19	"Matters of the Heart: Part 1"	Viktors Ritelis	Graeme Koetsveld	21 March 1988
552	N/A	"Matters of the Heart: Part 2"	Viktors Ritelis	Hugh Stuckey	22 March 1988
553	21	"Matters of the Heart: Part 3"	Robert Meillon	David Boutland	28 March 1988
554	22	"Matters of the Heart: Part 4"	Robert Meillon	Tony Morphett	29 March 1988
Parts 1 & 2: Jo's father unexpectedly arrives in the Valley along with a little sister Jo never knew she had. Ben's former girlfriend, Barbara, arrives at the hospital to take care of him. Terence and Alex have a medical emergency to attend to on their honeymoon when Penny's grandfather has a heart attack. Parts 3 & 4: Jo resolves to look after her little sister, but Frank and Shirley realise this can't go on forever. Terence and Alex return from their honeymoon. Ben's future as a country vet is in doubt as a result of his accident. Jo is hurt by what she sees as Frank and Shirley's betrayal and failure to stand by her when they call in social services and then Michelle's mother turns up.
555	23	"Common Cause: Part 1"	Robert Meillon	Sally Webb	4 April 1988
556	24	"Common Cause: Part 2"	Robert Meillon	Jenny Sharp & Caroline Stanton	5 April 1988
Jo settles into her new flat and inherits her school friend Sandy as a flatmate. After treating a twelve-year-old girl who thinks she is pregnant, Alex decides the time has come to set up a community health centre in the Valley. A young couple find their relationship put to the test when one of them reveals they have a sexually transmitted disease.
557	25	"Fallen Idols: Part 1"	Leigh Spence	David Allen	11 April 1988
558	26	"Fallen Idols: Part 2"	Leigh Spence	Judith Colquhoun	12 April 1988
A man's imprisonment has meant a sentence not only for himself but for his family too. Jo and Sandy plan a romantic dinner party, but the evening does not go as planned. Tommy returns to the Valley from prison to a frosty reception from his “friends” and family.
559	27	"False Pretences: Part 1"	Peter Andrikidis	Shane Brennan	18 April 1988
560	28	"False Pretences: Part 2"	Peter Andrikidis	Carol Williams	19 April 1988
Alex organises the opening of the Community Health Centre to a less than spectacular reception. Cathy and Matt go driving and end up spending the night under the stars together. Jo finds out that Sandy's boyfriend is married, but Sandy doesn't believe her. A grieving mother abandons her child and Alex is left holding the baby.
561	29	"Dark Horses: Part 1"	Peter Maxwell	Graeme Koetsveld	25 April 1988
562	30	"Dark Horses: Part 2"	Peter Maxwell	David Phillips	26 April 1988
After receiving a bang on the head, Bob mysteriously develops clairvoyant powers. A young woman returns from a holiday cruise to find out she is pregnant. Cookie tries to take advantage of Bob's powers. Cathy is bitten by a deadly snake and ends up in hospital, leaving Matt and Michael to cope with the farm.
563	31	"Going the Distance: Part 1"	Robert Meillon	Tom Galraith	2 May 1988
564	32	"Going the Distance: Part 2"	Robert Meillon	David Boutland	3 May 1988
A boy's illness could be a lot more serious than it appears. Michael's attempt to help a man who has lost the will to live fails. Matt is offered first refusal on Ben's practice. A father decides to take desperate measures to pay for medical treatment for his son, while Matt has a money-making scheme of his own.
565	33	"Seeing the Light: Part 1"	Leigh Spence	Hugh Stuckey	9 May 1988
566	34	"Seeing the Light: Part 2"	Leigh Spence	Steve J. Spears	10 May 1988
UFOs in the Valley? It certainly seems that way after Bob and Cookie discover a landing site, and when a strange man is admitted to hospital, Esme thinks he is an alien! Cathy's admiration for Matt quickly fades when he spends the night with another woman. When Alex opens Terence's old trunk, she's amazed by what she finds.
567	35	"No Place Like Home: Part 1"	Richard Sarell	Judith Colquhoun	16 May 1988
568	36	"No Place Like Home: Part 2"	Richard Sarell	David Allen	17 May 1988
Michael and Cathy spend a romantic afternoon on the river. Alex's dream to help the tenants of a dilapidated boarding house backfire when the landlady decides to evict them. Terence becomes environmentally friendly when he reads about the destruction of the ozone layer in the local paper. Jo is fed up with Sandy's burger empire and quits her job.
569	37	"Everybody's Doing It: Part 1"	Peter Andrikidis	David Phillips	23 May 1988
570	38	"Everybody's Doing It: Part 2"	Peter Andrikidis	Bill Searle	24 May 1988
Jo's search for a new flatmate ends when Sally moves in, but Jo doesn't know Sally as well as she thought. Terence and Alex have a difference of opinion – his idea of relaxing pastime is planting parsnips while hers is sinking into a spa. Michael and Matt try to force Cathy to see a doctor.
571	39	"Sparring Partners: Part 1"	Robert Meillon	Tim Pye & Bill Searle	30 May 1988
572	40	"Sparring Partners: Part 2"	Robert Meillon	Tim Pye	31 May 1988
Jo is battling the HSC blues. She is struggling with school and work and arguing with everyone. Jeff and Jill appear to be the perfect couple but looks can be deceiving. A girl's attraction to married man leads to a dangerous turn of events. Jo ends up in hospital as a patient when she collapses out of sheer exhaustion.
573	41	"Hard Act to Follow: Part 1"	Leigh Spence	Tony Morphett	6 June 1988
574	42	"Hard Act to Follow: Part 2"	Leigh Spence	David Boutland	7 June 1988
An aging drifter and his granddaughter arrive in town. When Esme is charmed by the stranger, Cookie is less than pleased. Alex becomes the object of a lovesick camel's affections. It's HSC exam time and Jo is very nervous. Charlie proposes to a smitten Esme. A boy's hopes for a brilliant career nose dives when he's caught cheating.
575	43	"Thanks for the Money: Part 1"	Richard Sarell	Brett Mitchell	13 June 1988
576	44	"Thanks for the Money: Part 2"	Richard Sarell	Stephen Measday	14 June 1988
A woman's memory lapse and her forgetfulness proves almost fatal when she sets her house on fire. Shirley develops a severe case of triskadekaphobia – a fear of the number thirteen. Matron Sloan is acting like a bear with a sore head, all because of a toothache and her fear of dentists, although she soon comes to her senses when Terence threatens her with a pair of pliers.
577	45	"Stand and Deliver: Part 1"	Peter Maxwell	Stephen Measday	20 June 1988
578	46	"Stand and Deliver: Part 2"	Peter Maxwell	Judith Colquhoun	21 June 1988
A boy who believes he is descended from Captain Midnight takes to his ancestor's bush ranging ways. A woman is reluctant to let Alex operate on her son. The town is in an uproar over the Bicentennial Art Exhibition-ist! Eddy Midnight and company smash a dog fighting ring.
579	47	"Young Girls: Part 1"	Peter Andrikidis	Tony Morphett	27 June 1988
580	48	"Young Girls: Part 2"	Peter Andrikidis	David Boutland	28 June 1988
A Reform School girl arrives for work experience at the park and takes a fancy to Matt. Michael decides to set matters straight between himself and Jo, once and for all. A girl with epilepsy has trouble coming to terms with her condition. Michael tries to explain to Jo how he feels, but she doesn't seem to want to listen.
581	49	"Paddling Your Own Canoe: Part 1"	Peter Maxwell	David Allen	4 July 1988
582	50	"Paddling Your Own Canoe: Part 2"	Peter Maxwell	Judith Colquhoun	5 July 1988
Jo's HSC results arrive. Terence tries to convince the mother of a terminally ill boy to give her son a chance to enjoy life. Jo's results are not what she expected, but she consoles herself by accepting a date with Rod. Michael has to come to terms with a ghost out of his past in order to help a sick boy.
583	51	"Off the Leash: Part 1"	Leigh Spence	Colin Free	11 July 1988
584	52	"Off the Leash: Part 2"	Leigh Spence	David Phillips	12 July 1988
Is there a werewolf stalking the Valley cemetery? Cookie thinks it’s curtain time when he is bitten by a mysterious monster. Michael has a secret admirer. Jo finds herself drawing closer to Rod, despite his father's disapproval. Rob blames himself for his father's heart attack, but Ted decides to use the situation to his own advantage.
585	53	"Hooked: Part 1"	Robert Meillon	N/A	18 July 1988
586	54	"Hooked: Part 2"	Robert Meillon	Graeme Koetsveld	19 July 1988
Terence's old flame, Marianna, starts work at the hospital and Alex is not happy. Jo tells Frank and Shirley of her plans to go away with Rob. Alex keeps drawing comparisons between herself and Marianna and can't help feeling inadequate. Jo is put out by Sheena's arrival, she is an old friend of Rob's and Jo's jealousy is quite evident.
587	55	"Accident: Part 1"	Richard Sarell	Steve J. Spears	25 July 1988
588	56	"Accident: Part 2"	Richard Sarell	Tom Galbraith	26 July 1988
The battle begins to save Michael's life. It seems as if his chances are slim and the doctors have no option but to operate. Jo is babysitting an insomniac child and is unaware of Michael's accident. Sophie is back in the Valley, and her arrival is bound to cause more trouble for her father and Alex.
589	57	"Fight or Fly: Part 1"	Viktors Ritelis	Bill Searle	1 August 1988
590	58	"Fight or Fly: Part 2"	Viktors Ritelis	Hugh Stuckey	2 August 1988
Michael's sister arrives in town and tries to hide the real reason for her visit. Cathy resigns when she is accused of being part of the bird poaching racket. Alex tries to speak to Terence about Sophie, but he refuses to listen to what she has to say.
591	59	"Sophie: Part 1"	Robert Meillon	David Boutland	8 August 1988
592	60	"Sophie: Part 2"	Robert Meillon	Tony Morphett	9 August 1988
593	61	"Sophie: Part 3"	Leigh Spence	David Phillips	15 August 1988
594	62	"Sophie: Part 4"	Leigh Spence	Judith Colquhoun	16 August 1988
Parts 1 & 2: Terence combs the seedy streets of Sydney searching for Sophie. Cathy is disillusioned with rangering and tries for a job as barmaid. Bob is admitted to hospital convinced that he is going to die. Terence finds Sophie, but she doesn't want to see him and asks him to leave. Alex tells a relieved Bob the results of his tests. Parts 3 & 4: Terence has trouble accepting Sophie's news. Matt tries to impress a woman by borrowing Michael's identity. Terence and Alex find their lives torn apart once again by Sophie. Jo and Frank go to the aid of a teenager who has been cheated by her employer. Sophie overdoses on heroin and her heart gives out as a result of all the years of abuse.
595	63	"Doing It Tough: Part 1"	Peter Maxwell	Bill Searle	22 August 1988
596	64	"Doing It Tough: Part 2"	Peter Maxwell	Graeme Koetsveld	23 August 1988
Terence, still grieving over Sophie, leaves Alex and she doesn't know how to handle it. Cathy is working at the club and has to put up with Muldoon. Michael is fed up with hospital life. Shirley returns from Queensland and tells Frank she has taken up golf. Cathy is having trouble coping with a temperamental French chef. Alex talks a patient out of committing suicide.
597	65	"Ethics: Part 1"	Viktors Ritelis	Geoff Newton	29 August 1988
598	66	"Ethics: Part 2"	Viktors Ritelis	Tom Galbraith	30 August 1988
Alex's plan to go and find Terence is foiled when she learns the truth about the locum she has intended to leave in charge. Michael is jealous and suspicious of Polly's private nurse, Scott. Polly collapses and Scott finds himself faced with a difficult decision. Cathy gets carried away during a moonlit stakeout with Matt.
599	67	"A Wing and a Prayer: Part 1"	Geoffrey Nottage	Steve J. Spears	5 September 1988
600	68	"A Wing and a Prayer: Part 2"	Geoffrey Nottage	Tim Pye	6 September 1988
Matt is convinced that Cathy has gone mad when she decides to take flying lessons. Matron Sloan has to act quickly when a boy has an accident on a tractor. The search is on to find the missing plane which has gone down in the National Park complete with Matron Sloan, Cathy, and young Craig all on board. Terence returns to Alex but has a lot of explaining to do.
601	69	"Back on Course: Part 1"	Robert Meillon	Judith Colquhoun	12 September 1988
602	70	"Back on Course: Part 2"	Robert Meillon	Sally Webb	13 September 1988
Terence tells Alex of his intention to give up medicine and take up farming full time. Esme finds it difficult entertaining a nine-year-old computer wiz. Terence is refusing to involve himself in hospital affairs. A woman finds it hard to get a straight answer on her newborn baby's condition and jumps to the wrong conclusion that her daughter has died.
603	71	"The Damage Done: Part 1"	Peter Maxwell	David Boutland	19 September 1988
604	72	"The Damage Done: Part 2"	Peter Maxwell	Tony Morphett	20 September 1988
A boy turns to his father for help when he is tormented by a fellow student. The hospital chef decides to propose to the girl of his dreams, but wakes up the next morning to find he has popped the question to someone entirely different. A terrified boy takes desperate measures to stop a bully.
605	73	"Remember Me: Part 1"	Viktors Ritelis	David Phillips	26 September 1988
606	74	"Remember Me: Part 2"	Viktors Ritelis	Graeme Koetsveld	27 September 1988
A dying woman comes to the Valley in search of her daughter. Could the girl who she is looking for be Jo? An asthmatic teenager believes that her condition is turning her into an outcast. Jo is determined to help Wendy find her daughter, even though everyone else telling her not to get involved.
607	75	"Personal Choice: Part 1"	Peter Andrikidis	Caroline Stanton	3 October 1988
608	76	"Personal Choice: Part 2"	Peter Andrikidis	Stephen Measday	4 October 1988
Jo decides to look for her mother and places an ad in all the local papers. Alex blames herself when Jenny checks herself out of hospital. Michael tells Jo he wants to buy another motorbike. Matt is fed up looking after smaller animals all the time.
609	77	"Power Play: Part 1"	Mike Smith	Caroline Stanton	10 October 1988
610	78	"Power Play: Part 2"	Mike Smith	Tom Galbraith	11 October 1988
Matt finds Sue injured in her car. She says she had a car accident, but Frank has trouble believing her. Matt is blames for the death of a prize bull. After much coaxing, Sue finally breaks down and confesses to Alex that she was raped by a guy she gave a lift home to.
611	79	"Sins of the Fathers: Part 1"	Leigh Spence	Steve J. Spears	17 October 1988
612	80	"Sins of the Fathers: Part 2"	Leigh Spence	Hugh Stuckey	18 October 1988
Michael starts his stint as acting Matron and finds that life certainly wasn't meant to be easy. Matt is disappointed when the female vet he had been expecting turns out to be male. Old ghosts come back to haunt Terence on Sophie's birthday. Cathy is instantly attracted to Mario, the Italian vet.
613	81	"A Tangled Web: Part 1"	Robert Meillon	Tom Mitchell	24 October 1988
614	82	"A Tangled Web: Part 2"	Robert Meillon	Judith Colquhoun	25 October 1988
Bob proclaims his innocence when he is arrested for drunk driving. Cathy is swept off her feet on a romantic trip to Sydney. With Mario but is stunned when Mario proposes. Michael is blamed for the death of a patient in his care and offers his resignation to save the hospital embarrassment when the man's widow threatens to sue.
615	83	"If Good Men Do Nothing: Part 1"	Peter Andrikidis	David Boutland	31 October 1988
616	84	"If Good Men Do Nothing: Part 2"	Peter Andrikidis	Tim Pye	1 November 1988
Cathy prepares to fly off to Italy with Mario, but more important matters come first when she uncovers a marijuanna plantation in the National Park. Frank is excited at the thought of making a big drug bust. Cathy starts to hesitate about Mario and her trip when she has second thoughts.
617	85	"Legacy: Part 1"	Mike Smith	Tim Pye	7 November 1988
618	86	"Legacy: Part 2"	Mike Smith	David Phillips	8 November 1988
A boy is injured in a car accident and Frank is having trouble finding the driver responsible. Matt's day doesn't start too well when he gets a visit from the taxation department. A woman has a difficult decision to make when her young son dies. Cathy and Matt do battle with a crotchety old man.
619	87	"Family Ties: Part 1"	Leigh Spence	Geoff Newton	14 November 1988
620	88	"Family Ties: Part 2"	Leigh Spence	Sally Webb	15 November 1988
Matt helps a young woman give birth in Cathy's barn. Alex has some news for Terence, but she isn't sure how he'll react to it. Why is Matron Sloan in a good mood? Is there a new man on the horizon? A goat wreaks havoc in the hospital when Jo tries to help an old lady. Alex finally plucks up her courage to tell Terence she is pregnant. To her delight, he is happy with the news.
