= A Country Practice =

1981–1993; 1994 Australian television series

- Main title caption in 1981, depicting the Wandin Valley Clinic.
- Genre: Soap opera
- Created by: James Davern
- Starring: (see Cast List in Article)
- Theme music composer: Mike Perjanik
- Opening theme: A Country Practice (instrumental)
- Ending theme: Reprise
- Country of origin: Australia
- Original language: English
- No. of seasons: 14
- No. of episodes: 1,088 (List of episodes)

Production
- Producer: James Davern
- Running time: 48 minutes
- Production company: JNP Productions

Original release
- Network: Seven Network (1981–93); Network Ten (1994)
- Release: 18 November 1981 – 19 November 1994

A Country Practice is an Australian television soap opera/serial which was broadcast on the Seven Network from 18 November 1981 in Sydney and 23 November 1981 in Melbourne, until 22 November 1993, and subsequently on Network Ten from 13 April 1994 to 19 November 1994. Altogether, 14 seasons and 1,088 episodes were produced.

The series was set in the fictional rural town of Wandin Valley, New South Wales and centred around the permanent residents and visitors of the Wandin Valley Bush Nursing Hospital, with other scenes taking place at the associated medical clinics, local police station, RSL club, and throughout the wider Valley, including the neighbouring town of Burrigan. The show was produced at the ATN-7's production facility at Epping. Pitt Town and Oakville, suburbs on the outskirts of northwest Sydney, Australia, were used for most of the exterior filming; Oakville's historic heritage-listed Clare House, built in 1838, served as the location for the series' primary setting.

The series featured Gold Logie award-winning former variety star Lorrae Desmond, and several of the other regular cast members became popular celebrities as a result of their roles in the series. It also featured a number of native Australian animals, particularly the iconic "Fatso the wombat", adding to its appeal both domestically and internationally. After the series was cancelled by the Seven Network in 1993, the series was briefly relaunched on Network Ten in 1994.

At the time of its cancellation, A Country Practice was the longest-running Australian TV drama; however, by the late 1990s, that record was surpassed by Network Ten series Neighbours. At the height of its popularity, the show attracted 8–10 million Australian viewers weekly (at a time when the population of Australia was 15 million). The series was eventually sold to, and broadcast in, 48 countries.

== Creation ==
A Country Practice was created and executively produced by James Davern, who had previously worked as a producer and director on the similar rural-based series Bellbird, which was broadcast on ABC Television from 1967–1977. In 1979, he entered the pilot episode under the name In General Practice into a script-writing competition hosted by Network Ten. Davern's script came in third, behind two plays. After three months, Ten passed on the series and Davern took the script to the general manager of the Seven Network, who asked for a further thirteen episodes. Davern hired Lynn Bayonas and Moya Woods to help him write the scripts, as well as Hugh Stuckey to inject some comedy into the series. Davern's contribution to the industry was recognised when he was honoured with the Order of Australia (OAM) in 2014.

== Production ==
=== Format ===
Though sometimes considered a soap opera, the storylines of the show's two 45 minute episodes screened over any one week formed a self-contained narrative block. The storylines were meant to have a primary appeal to adult and older youthful audiences, and in particular they had greater appeal to children from middle-class backgrounds. As it did not have the open ended narrative of a traditional soap opera, it was technically a "series". Nevertheless, many storylines were developed as sub-plots for several episodes before becoming the focus of a particular week's narrative block. Overall, the program "so emphasized the ongoing storylines of its major characters as to make the distinction between series and serial more or less meaningless".

=== Cancellation and continuation ===
After the end of its run on the Seven Network, it was announced that the serial would be picked up by Network Ten with a mainly new cast and a few key cast members continuing from the Seven series. Unlike the Seven series which was produced in Sydney, the Network Ten series was produced in Melbourne with location shooting in Emerald, Victoria. The new series debuted in April 1994, but was not as successful and was abruptly cancelled in November. The series featured actors including Paul Gleason, Jane Hall, Vince Colosimo, Claudia Black and Laura Armstrong.

== Cast ==
=== Main cast timeline ===
Actor	Character	Seasons													
Actor	Character	1 ('81)	2 ('82)	3 ('83)	4 ('84)	5 ('85)	6 ('86)	7 ('87)	8 ('88)	9 ('89)	10 ('90)	11 ('91)	12 ('92)	13 ('93)	14 ('94)
Shane Porteous	Dr. Terence Elliott	Main	Main	Main	Main	Main	Main	Main	Main	Main	Main	Main	Main	Main	
Helen Scott	Matron Marta Kertesz	Main (Note: Scott departs in "Love & Glory" (ep. 3.20).)	Main	Main											
Grant Dodwell	Dr. Simon Bowen	Main (Note: Dodwell departs in "Good Mates" (ep. 6.10).)	Main	Main	Main	Main	Main								
Penny Cook	Dr. Vicky Dean/Bowen	Main (Note: Cook departs in "New Pastures" (ep. 5.70).)	Main	Main	Main	Main	Guest							Guest	
Brian Wenzel	Sgt. Frank Gilroy/Frank Gilroy	Main	Main	Main	Main	Main	Main	Main	Main	Main	Main	Main	Main	Main	
Lorrae Desmond	Sister Shirley Dean/Gilroy	Main (Note: Desmond departs in "A Kiss Before Dying" (ep. 12.42).)	Main	Main	Main	Main	Main	Main	Main	Main	Main	Main	Main		
Anne Tenney	Melissa "Molly" Jones	Main (Note: Tenney departs in "Molly" (ep. 5.32).)	Main	Main	Main	Main									
Shane Withington	Brendan Jones	Main (Note: Withington and Nicol depart in "One For the Road" (ep. 6.28).)	Main	Main	Main	Main	Main								
Joyce Jacobs	Esme Watson	Guest	Main (Note: Initially recurring, Jacobs, Heylen and Piper are added to the opening credits from "The Push" (ep. 2.93).)	Main	Main	Main	Main	Main	Main	Main	Main	Main	Main	Main	Main
Syd Heylen	Vernon "Cookie" Locke		Main (Note: Heylen, Piper and Day depart in "Wings" (ep. 12.16). Heylen and Piper return as guests in "Travelling South" (ep. 12.30).)	Main	Main	Main	Main	Main	Main	Main	Main	Main	Main		
Gordon Piper	Robert "Bob" Hatfield	Guest	Main	Main	Main	Main	Main	Main	Main	Main	Main	Main	Main		
Emily Nicol	Chloe Jones		Recurring (Note: Sarah Lucek-Rowley initially plays the role from "Coming Ready or Not" (ep. 2.81), before Nicol takes over the role from "Little Voices" (ep. 3.1).)	Recurring	Recurring	Main (Note: Initially recurring, Nicol, Sydney and Strehlow are added to the opening credits from "On the Edge" (ep. 5.7).)	Main								
Joan Sydney	Margaret "Maggie" Sloane/Matron Sloane			Recurring	Recurring	Main (Note: Sydney departs in "Romancing the Sloan" (ep. 10.18).)	Main	Main	Main	Main	Main			Guest	Main
Wendy Strehlow	Sister. Judy Loveday	Guest	Recurring	Recurring	Recurring	Main (Note: Strehlow departs in "Caterpillars & Butterflies" (ep. 6.54).)	Main								
Nicholas Bufalo	Dr. Ben Green					Main (Note: Bufalo and Davies are added to the opening credits from "Time Out" (ep. 5.71).) (Note: Bufalo departs in "Matters of the Heart" (ep. 8.22).)	Main	Main	Main						
Annie Davies	Kelly Shanahan					Main (Note: Davies departs in "Fighting Chance" (ep. 6.36).)	Main								
Josephine Mitchell	Jo Loveday/Langley					Recurring	Main (Note: Initially recurring, Mitchell is added to the opening credits from "Track Record" (ep. 6.29).) (Note: Mitchell and Climo depart in "On the Threshold" (ep. 9.14).)	Main	Main	Main					
Di Smith	Dr. Alex Fraser/Elliott						Main (Note: Smith is added to the opening credits from "In Love and War" (ep. 6.37).) (Note: Smith departs in "Last of the Summer Wine" (ep. 9.16).)	Main	Main	Main					
Mark Owen-Taylor	Peter Manning						Main (Note: Owen-Taylor is added to the opening credits from "Black Sheep" (ep. 6.41).) (Note: Owen-Taylor departs in "Keep on Truckin'" (ep. 7.46), but returns as a guest in "Picking up the Pieces" (ep. 7.63).)	Main							
Caroline Johansson	Donna Manning						Main (Note: Johannson is added to the opening credits from "The Deep End" (ep. 6.49).) (Note: Owen-Johansson departs in "Mozart Rules" (ep. 7.62).)	Main							
Kate Raison	Cathy Hayden							Main (Note: Initially recurring, Raison is added to the opening credits from "Nobody's Perfect" (ep. 7.47).) (Note: Raison departs in "Kiss Me Kate" (ep. 10.20).)	Main	Main	Main				
Brett Climo	Michael Langley							Main (Note: Climo is added to the opening credits from "Going for Broke" (ep. 7.73).)	Main	Main					
John Tarrant	Matthew Tyler								Main (Note: Initially recurring, Tarrant is added to the opening credits from "Common Cause" (ep. 8.23).) (Note: Tarrant and Parker depart in "Little Boy Blue" (ep. 12.28).)	Main	Main	Main	Main		
Georgie Parker	Lucy Gardner/Tyler									Main (Note: Parker is added to the opening credits from "Snake in the Grass" (ep. 9.17).)	Main	Main	Main		
Michael Muntz	Dr. Cris Kouros									Main (Note: Muntz and Fisher are added to the opening credits from "Nobody's Fool" (ep. 9.23). They depart (with Regan) in "Such Sweet Sorrow" (ep. 11.20).)	Main	Main			
Georgina Fisher	Jessica "Jessie" Kouros									Main	Main	Main			
Matt Day	Julian "Luke" Ross									Main (Note: Initially recurring, Day is added to the opening credits from "Hook, Line and Sinker" (ep. 9.67).)	Main	Main	Main		
Sophie Heathcote	Stephanie "Steve" Brennan										Main (Note: Heathcote is added to the opening credits from "Change of Heart" (ep. 10.21).) (Note: Heathcote departs in "Farewell My Lovely" (ep. 11.54).)	Main			
Mary Regan	DN. Ann Brennan										Main (Note: Regan is added to the opening credits from "Sisters" (ep. 10.23).)	Main			
Maureen Edwards	Matron. Rosemary Prior/Elliot											Main (Note: Edwards is added to the opening credits from "Out of Africa" (ep. 11.21).)	Main	Main	
Andrew Blackman	Dr. Harry Morrison											Main (Note: Blackman is added to the opening credits from "Bigger Than Texas" (ep. 11.25).)	Main	Main	Main
Michelle Pettigrove	Sister Kate Bryant/Morrison											Main (Note: Pettigrove is added to the opening credits from "Gift of Life" (ep. 11.33).)	Main	Main	Guest
Kym Wilson	Darcy Hudson											Main (Note: Wilson is added to the opening credits from "Dangerous Liaisons" (ep. 11.83).)	Main	Main	
Gavin Harrison	Hugo Szreclecki												Main (Note: Harrison is added to the opening credits from "Feet of Clay" (ep. 12.3).)	Main	
Jon Concannon	Sgt. Tom Newman												Main (Note: Concannon is added to the opening credits from "A Different Drum" (ep. 12.17).)	Main	
Judith McGrath	Bernice Hudson												Main (Note: McGrath is added to the opening credits from "Travelling South" (ep. 12.29).)	Main	
Anne Looby	Dr. Anna Lacey												Main (Note: Looby and Croft are added to the opening credits from "Phoenix" (ep. 12.31).)	Main	
Jamie Croft	Billy Moss												Main	Main	
Allan Penney	Perce Hudson							Guest	Guest	Guest	Guest	Recurring	Recurring	Main	
Paul Gleeson	Ian McIntyre													Recurring	Main
Claudia Black	Claire Bonacci													Guest	Main
Vince Colosimo	Danny Sabatini														Main
Laura Armstrong	Georgie Wilkes														Main (Note: Armstrong is added to the opening credits from "the Trouble With Women" (ep. 14.3).)
Jane Hall	Dr. Jessica Morrison														Main (Note: Hall is added to the opening credits from "Best of Friends" (ep. 14.4).)

=== Seven Network years (1981–1993) ===
- Shane Porteous as Dr. Terence Elliot (seasons 1–13)
- Helen Scott as Matron Marta Kurtesz (seasons 1–3)
- Grant Dodwell as Dr. Simon Bowen (seasons 1–6)
- Penny Cook as Vicky Dean Bowen (seasons 1–5; guest in seasons 6, 13)
- Brian Wenzel as Frank Gilroy (seasons 1–13)
- Lorrae Desmond as Nurse Sister Shirley Dean Gilroy (seasons 1–12)
- Anne Tenney as Molly Jones (seasons 1–5)
- Shane Withington as Brendan Jones (seasons 1–6)
- Joyce Jacobs as Esme Watson (seasons 2–13; guest in season 1), appeared in pilot as Norma
- Syd Heylen as Vernon "Cookie" Locke (seasons 2–12)
- Gordon Piper as Bob Hatfield (seasons 2–12; guest in season 1)
- Emily Nicol as Chloe Jones (seasons 5–6; recurring seasons 3–4)
- Joan Sydney as Matron Margaret "Maggie" Sloane (seasons 5–10; recurring seasons 3–4, 13)
- Wendy Strehlow as Sister Judy Loveday (seasons 5–6; recurring seasons 1–4)
- Nicholas Bufalo as Dr. Ben Green (seasons 5–8)
- Annie Davies as Kelly Shanahan (seasons 5–6)
- Josephine Mitchell as Jo Loveday Langley (season 6–9; recurring season 5)
- Diane Smith as Dr. Alex Fraser (seasons 6–9)
- Mark Owen-Taylor as Peter Manning (seasons 6–7)
- Caroline Johansson as Nurse Sister Donna Manning (seasons 6–8)
- Kate Raison as Cathy Hayden (seasons 7–10)
- Brett Climo as Michael Langley (seasons 7–9)
- John Tarrant as Matthew Tyler (seasons 8–12)
- Georgie Parker as Nurse Lucy Gardner Tyler (seasons 9–12), had previously appeared in a guest role as Barbara Gottlieb in 1988
- Michael Muntz as Dr. Cris Kouros (seasons 9–11)
- Georgina Fisher as Jessica "Jessie" Kouros (seasons 9–11)
- Matt Day as Julian "Luke" Ross (seasons 9–12)
- Sophie Heathcote as Stephanie "Steve" Brennan (seasons 10–11)
- Mary Regan as Director of Nursing Ann Brennan (seasons 10–11)
- Maureen Edwards as Matron Rosemary Prior Elliot (seasons 11–13), had previously appeared in guest roles as Yvonne McLean in 1983, and Katherine D'Angelo in 1990)
- Andrew Blackman as Dr. Harry Morrison (seasons 11–13)
- Michelle Pettigrove as Nurse Kate Bryant Morrison (seasons 11–13), had previously appeared in a guest role as Mary O'Connor in 1988
- Kym Wilson as Darcy Hudson (seasons 11–13), had previously appeared in a guest role as Leanne Baxter in 1989
- Jon Concannon as Senior Constable Tom Newman (seasons 12–13)
- Gavin Harrison as Hugo Szreclecki (seasons 12–13), had previously appeared in a guest role as J.J. Moffitt in 1987 and Mick O'Brian in 1990)
- Judith McGrath as Bernice Hudson (seasons 12–13)
- Anne Looby as Dr. Anna Lacey Newman (seasons 12–13), had previously appeared in a guest role as Jennifer Rose in 1990
- Jamie Croft as Billy Moss (seasons 12–13), had previously appeared in a guest role as Ashley Baker in 1991
- Allan Penney as Perce Hudson (season 13; recurring seasons 7–12), had previously appeared in guest roles as Arty Turner in 1981, Alf Trotter in 1982 and Alfred Hitchins in 1984

=== Network Ten year (1994) ===
Only three series regulars from the Network Seven series – Joan Sydney, Joyce Jacobs, and Andrew Blackman – were retained in the Network Ten re-launch. Michelle Pettigrove returned as a guest in the first episode only.

- Joan Sydney as Matron Maggie Morrison
- Andrew Blackman as Dr. Harry Morrison
- Joyce Jacobs as Esme Watson
- Paul Gleeson as Ian McIntyre (appeared in the final 8 episodes of the Seven Network series)
- Claudia Black as Claire Bonacci (appeared in the final 4 episodes of the Seven Network series)
- Vince Colosimo as Danny Sabatini
- Laura Armstrong as Georgie Wilkes
- Jane Hall as Dr. Jess Morrison

== Episodes ==
The dates given are the original transmission dates on ATN-7 in Sydney. Dates varied on other Seven Network stations and on regional TV channels. During the first seven seasons, episodes were shown on Melbourne station HSV-7 some weeks after debuting in Sydney, but from Season 8, the Seven Network usually screened the episodes simultaneously across both stations.

The way the seasons were released on DVD does not always reflect the way the series was originally transmitted, with the number of episodes in a season differing between television broadcasts and the DVDs.

Series	Episodes	Originally released		
Series	Episodes	First released	Last released	Network
1	14	18 November 1981	31 December 1981	Seven Network
2	90	5 January 1982	10 November 1982	Seven Network
3	86	25 January 1983	9 November 1983	Seven Network
4	84	31 January 1984	7 November 1984	Seven Network
5	82	15 January 1985	6 November 1985	Seven Network
6	86	14 January 1986	5 November 1986	Seven Network
7	90	12 January 1987	17 November 1987	Seven Network
8	88	18 January 1988	15 November 1988	Seven Network
9	86	23 January 1989	14 November 1989	Seven Network
10	86	22 January 1990	13 November 1990	Seven Network
11	90	21 January 1991	26 November 1991	Seven Network
12	86	20 January 1992	24 November 1992	Seven Network
13	90	18 January 1993	22 November 1993	Seven Network
14	30	13 April 1994	19 November 1994	Network Ten

=== Setting and stories ===
The series followed the workings of a small hospital in the fictional New South Wales rural country town of Wandin Valley, as well as its connected medical clinic, the town's veterinary surgery, RSL club/pub and local police station. The show's storylines focused on the staff and regular patients of the hospital and general practice, their families, and other residents of the town. Through its weekly guest actors, it explored various social and medical problems. The series examined such topical issues as youth unemployment, suicide, drug addiction, HIV/AIDS and terminal illness. Apart from its regular rotating cast, A Country Practice also had a cast of semi-regulars who made appearances as the storylines permitted. The program also showcased a number of animal stars and Australian native wildlife, most famously Fatso the wombat. Fatso was played throughout the series by three separate wombats, the original actually named Fatso (1981–1986) was replaced due to temperament issues with the cast, a wombat George (1986–1990), he himself replaced due to early signs of wombat mange (a marsupial viral disease), and Garth (1990 through series end).

=== Highest rating episode ===
Anne Tenney played Molly Jones, who became one of the most popular characters, particularly in the series' early years. Molly was an unconventional fashion designer, farmer and local environmentalist, and after Tenney decided to leave the series, her character's death episode became the highest rating, and most remembered storyline. The series 13 week storyline arc dealt with how a young woman, as well as her husband and local residents, coped with terminal illness, after the character was diagnosed with leukaemia. The final episode sees the character of Molly sitting in her back garden and waving while her husband, Brendan, is teaching their daughter, Chloe, to fly a kite. He sees Molly is fading, and calls her name as the screen fades to black. This storyline arc was originally written to be featured over a continuing 11 week script. A producer realised that the ratings were not being monitored during this period, so it was extended for 13 weeks, and hence 4 extra 1 hour episodes.

Other iconic storylines over its 12-year run include the wedding of Dr. Simon Bowen (Grant Dodwell) to local vet Vicki Dean (Penny Cook) in 1983, the death of nurse Donna Manning in a car crash in 1987, and the off-screen death of longtime resident Shirley Gilroy, played by Lorrae Desmond, in a plane crash in 1992.

== Logie Awards ==
A Country Practice is the third most successful television program after Home and Away (1st) and Neighbours (2nd), at the Logie Awards, having won 29 awards during its twelve years of production.

Logie Awards 1983

- Best Supporting Actor In A Series: Brian Wenzel
- Best Juvenile Performance: Jeremy Shadlow

Logie awards 1984

- Most Popular Actor: Grant Dodwell
- NSW Most Popular Female: Penny Cook
- NSW Most Popular Show: A Country Practice
- Most Popular Drama Series: A Country Practice
- Best Supporting Actress In A Series: Lorrae Desmond

Logie Awards 1985

- Most Popular Lead Actor: Grant Dodwell
- Most Popular Lead Actress: Anne Tenney
- NSW Most Popular Male: Grant Dodwell
- NSW Most Popular Female: Penny Cook
- NSW Most Popular Show: A Country Practice
- Most Popular Drama Program: A Country Practice
- Best Lead Actor In A Series: Shane Withington
- Best Supporting Actress In A Series: Wendy Strehlow

Logie Awards 1986

- Most Popular Australian Actor: Grant Dodwell
- Most Popular Australian Actress: Anne Tenney
- NSW Most Popular Female: Anne Tenney
- NSW Most Popular Program: A Country Practice
- Most Popular Australian Drama: A Country Practice

Logie Awards 1987

- NSW Most Popular Program: A Country Practice

Logie Awards 1988

- NSW Most Popular Program: A Country Practice

Logie Awards 1989

- Most Outstanding Actress: Joan Sydney
- NSW Most Popular Program: A Country Practice

Logie Awards 1990

- Most Outstanding Actor: Shane Porteous
- Most Popular New Talent: Georgie Parker

Logie Awards 1991

- Most Popular Actress: Georgie Parker

Logie Awards 1992

- Most Popular Actress: Georgie Parker

Logie Awards 1993

- Most Popular Actress: Georgie Parker

Logie Awards 2026

- Logie Hall of Fame recipient

== Broadcast ==
A Country Practice originally aired on the Seven Network twice-weekly at 7.30pm, with the days it was shown varying between markets over the first few seasons, but settling into a regular Monday and Tuesday network-wide pattern by 1988. The unsuccessful 1994 Network 10 remake of the series aired originally at 7:30pm on Wednesday nights, but moved to the same time on Saturday nights a few weeks later. In late July, it moved to a low-rating timeslot of 5:30pm Saturday evenings, directly against Channel Seven's Saturday AFL coverage.

Seven also aired repeats of the original series at 9:30 weekday mornings from 1995 to 2002.

Foxtel's Hallmark Channel broadcast the complete series twice (including the short-lived Network Ten series) in a 2-hour block at 3:30 to 5:30 weekday afternoons from 2002 to 30 June 2010.

In 2014, 7TWO ran repeats at 02:00 on weekday mornings.

== International broadcasts ==
=== United Kingdom ===
The series also had a successful run on the ITV network in the United Kingdom. A Country Practice began on Wednesday, 27 October 1982 – less than a year after its debut on Seven Network in Australia.

Originally, the series was partially networked by Thames Television, the weekday contractor for the London area, to a cluster of ITV regions; Anglia Television, Border Television, Granada Television, Yorkshire Television and TVS. These regions all aired one weekly episode on Wednesdays at 14:45–15:45, moving to 14:30-15:30 in 1983, in the original, hour-long format. The remaining ITV contractors: Central Independent Television, Channel Television, HTV, TSW, Scottish Television, UTV, Tyne Tees, and Grampian Television – all started later, with UTV being the last to start in late 1989.

Of the broadcast years covering 1982 through to 1989, all of the ITV regions began scheduling the program on a day and at a time of their own choice, but most generally continued with the weekly hour-long format. The slower pace of one weekly episode all year round (as opposed to two in Australia for ten months, Feb-Nov) meant that UK broadcasts quickly fell behind Australia, and the regions were all at vastly different points in the storyline by 1988 when the serial was put on hiatus in a handful of areas for a new Australian series, Richmond Hill, which took the Wednesday and Thursday afternoon 14:00 slot from October. When that series ended in August the following year, A Country Practice was resumed as its replacement (although most regions had continued to show it).

By around 1990, many ITV regions decided to change how they broadcast episodes of A Country Practice. Each franchise adopted the method of editing each episode into two half-hour editions, which allowed the series to be stripped Monday to Friday, usually before, or after, the lunchtime edition of Home and Away. This half-hour format of airing the series had already been established by Yorkshire Television from October 1984, TVS from 1987, Thames from 1988, and due to the backlog of episodes now available, stripped half-hour editions could air uninterrupted (except on bank holidays etc) and at an increased output of up to two and a half episodes each week. This format did however result in the curtailment of the full closing credits in certain regions from January 1994. Scottish Television was the only exception, and they chose various days and timeslots, but always screened A Country Practice in the original hour-long format.

A substantial amount was withdrawn from transmission by some regions as the content was considered unsuitable for daytime viewing and this inevitably led to considerable chunks of the story being skipped. Considered a daytime soap, A Country Practice was popular in the UK and achieved consolidated viewing figures of between 2–3 million. Some regions (HTV, Border, Grampian, TSW and Granada) moved the later episodes of the series to an early evening slot of 17.10–17.40.

ITV regional broadcasts

- Originally starting in 1982, Yorkshire Television broke away from the networked transmissions in October 1984 and were the first region to began editing each episode into two half-hour episodes, screening on Mondays and Tuesdays at 15:30. This led to continuity problems as whenever a public holiday occurred (on Monday), the 15:30 slot would be unavailable. The series was moved back to an early afternoon hour-long format in 1988 when Sons and Daughters was aired five afternoons a week at 15:30. A Country Practice then replaced Sons and Daughters when that series ended in March 1989, again split into half-hour episodes and shown five afternoons a week for the first time. In 1990, it was then moved to earlier afternoon, 13:50–14:00, and eventually, hour-long episodes were reinstated. The series concluded in March 1998 and the Network Ten series was not shown. When Tyne Tees Television merged with Yorkshire, a number of episodes were skipped. This was to allow an alignment of schedules for the two regions.
- After initially airing weekly hour-long episodes (usually on Wednesdays) from 1982, both TVS and Thames Television followed Yorkshire's example of showing half-hour episodes each week. TVS initially used 14:00-14:30 from 1987 before following Thames with the 12:30–13:00, Monday to Wednesday, slot, from 1988. In 1990, both of these regions adopted the 13:50–14:20 time, on various days and frequency.
- Central Television originally began A Country Practice on 5 July 1983, airing ten episodes weekly on Tuesday mornings, 11:10–12:00, during the summer, but by mid-September, the series had been shelved. Several years later on Friday, 16 September 1988 - while all the other ITV regions were well into their respective runs – Central re-launched the series, starting again from Episode 1. Initially showing weekly hour-long episodes, in mid-1990 they followed Thames, Yorkshire, and TVS by showing half-hour episodes. In May, it appeared in an early-afternoon slot, 14:00-14:30, Monday to Friday, and in September 1990, this changed slightly to 13:50–14:20. From January 1993, moves to 13:15–13:45, and then briefly switches to mid-afternoon in September 1993, and then 15:00–15:30 until the end of that year. Returns to 14:50–15:20 until March 1994, after which, it is moved back to lunchtimes at 13:55–14:25. By 1997, Central was airing A Country Practice at 12:55–13:25, and in 1998, the network concluded the original series in April in the 13:00–13:30 slot, and then immediately commenced the short-lived, 30-episode Network Ten version, finally completing all the episodes on Friday, 31 July 1998.
- Scottish Television started broadcasting the series in 1983 and always aired A Country Practice as hour-long episodes. Throughout the 1980s the program moved about in time and day but was generally broadcast once a week in an afternoon slot. In January 1994, after (episode #486), it was dropped from the schedules for about 4 months until June. From episode 491 screened every weekday morning at 10:55 for the duration of the summer school holidays (around 6 weeks) until 2 September. It reverted to its old weekly Tuesday slot the following week. It was the dropped completely after episode #588, during April 1995 replaced by Blue Heelers. Although the company took over Grampian Television, the series continued until the end. The Series switched to 30min format in 1995, by Summer 1998 was being screened each week day.
- HTV started the series on Wednesday, 19 January 1983, broadcasting 1 hour episodes [most] Wednesdays, 14:00–14:55, until 1990, when the series moved to 15:25, Wednesday to Friday as replacement for Sons and Daughters in half-hour format for the first time on HTV. This briefly increased to Monday-Friday, but from September 1993, it's moved to earlier time, 13:50–14:20, and only twice weekly. In March 1994, it began airing in the early evening, 17:10–17:40. By the end of 1998, the series had been reduced again to being shown on Thursdays and Fridays only. From January to March 1999, the series was shown on Tuesday through to Friday until Friday 5 March 1999 when the final Channel Seven episode was reached. HTV were the last ITV region to complete the series (and did not show the short lived Channel 10 series).
- Carlton Television superseded Thames Television in January 1993, and they continued to air the series using the 13:50–14:20 timeslot. In January 1995, Carlton launched a new Australian series, Blue Heelers, and it took the 14:50–15:20 slot, Monday to Wednesday, and a new series from New Zealand Shortland Street in the 13:55 slot on Monday, Wednesday and Friday with A Country Practice on Tuesday and Thursday, and this pattern continued until they became the first region to reach the last episode, on 25 April 1996. Anglia Television was next to finish in 1997, and they then began a short repeat of the first 40 episodes.
- Granada Television broke away from the Thames Television broadcasts, moving the series to Thursdays, 14:00–15:00, from January 1984. This continued until mid-1990, when Granada decided to follow the majority of ITV regions with the half-hourly stripped format, broadcast at lunchtime, Monday to Friday, 13:50–14:20. During 1994 until the autumn of 1996, the series was moved to the early-evening 17:10–17:40 timeslot, Monday to Thursday – in September 1996, however, it returned to 13:50–14:20, and now airing Tuesday to Friday. By January 1998, hour-long episodes had been reinstated, and these aired on Mondays and Fridays, 13:55–14:45, and this continued until the end of the series in April 1998. Border Television had, by now, aligned with Granada's run of the series and followed their broadcast schedule.
- Tyne Tees began showing the series on Wednesday, 5 September 1984 at 1.30-2.30pm, and continued to show hour-long episodes until December 1992, increasing to two or three episodes a week in 1992, although the days and times varied. For a short time in 1991, Tyne Tees changed to showing 30-minute episodes due to ITN’s coverage of the Gulf War pre-empting its usual slot. In January 1993, Tyne Tees skipped a number of episodes to align their schedule with that of Yorkshire Television, who were then showing 30-minute episodes from the following season. Both stations reinstated hour-long episodes, up to three afternoons a week, and completed the original series in early 1998. The Network Ten series was not shown.
- TSW and Channel Television began the series on Wednesday, 21 September 1983 and initially aired A Country Practice weekly at 14:00–15:00. In August 1989, TSW added an additional hour long episode on Thursdays (replacing Richmond Hill). In 1990, TSW followed the rest of the English ITV regions and aired five, half-hour episodes, Monday to Friday, at lunchtimes. In January 1993, Westcountry Television took over the regional franchise, and they moved the series to 15:20-15:50, then from September 1993 the series was moved to 14.55, until they concluded the series in 1997. Due to changes in their networking arrangements, Channel Television aligned with TVS broadcasts rather than TSW broadcasts from January 1986, meaning some episodes were skipped in the Channel Islands.
- TVS was replaced by Meridian Television on 1 January 1993 and the company continued to air A Country Practice. The original 7 Network series concluded in April 1997, and then Meridian immediately commenced the Network Ten series, with half-hour episodes on Monday, Wednesday, and Friday, 12:55-13:25, until the last episode aired in September 1997.
- UTV dropped A Country Practice in early September 1998. At that particular point, UTV had been airing episodes only once a week - on Mondays - at 2:45pm, in a 30-minute slot. UTV had reached episodes from early 1993, season 13.

Satellite and cable broadcasts

- In the mid-1980s, A Country Practice was a prime-time series on the pan-European satellite channel, "Sky Channel", twice weekly at 20:00, from April 1984, on Tuesday and Thursday. By August 1985, the series was being screened at 19:20 and 20:10, still on Tuesday and Thursday evenings, and in 1986, it was screened at 20:00 again. By January 1988, it was broadcast on Tuesday and Wednesday evening at 20:25. When the Sky Channel was re-launched on the new Astra 1A satellite in February 1989, it became a UK-only service, and play-out facilities for Sky programmes were moved to the UK. Due to the ITV network having first-run rights to A Country Practice in the UK, and Sky Channel having overtaken the point where ITV were in the storyline, they weren't able to premiere new episodes before ITV - therefore, A Country Practice disappeared from the Sky schedule after four and a half years and was never resumed. For a brief period, later episodes were shown in 1997 on the cable channel Carlton Select.

Only the first 40 episodes have ever been repeated in the UK, in 1997, when ITV contractor, Anglia Television, were the only region to repeat any episodes. Unlike other Australian soaps, which became cult viewing due to multiple runs; Prisoner was broadcast twice, first on ITV, and then Channel 5; The Sullivans also had two full runs, once on ITV and repeated on UK Gold; and also Sons and Daughters, which had three runs, first on ITV, then UK Gold, and finally, Channel 5 – A Country Practice has never been repeated in the UK or achieved the cult status of other soap operas of the same vintage.

=== European screenings ===
==== France ====
A Country Practice was named "À Coeur Ouvert". The series premiered on FR3 in 1989.

==== Germany ====
A Country Practice was named Das Buschkrankenhaus (The Country Hospital), and aired on Sat 1 in 1985, and then on ARD from 1989 to 1991.

==== Italy ====
A Country Practice was named "Wandin Valley". Only 170 episodes were broadcast on local television stations in Italy, and the dub was made at TSI in Switzerland.

==== Ireland ====
Episode one debuted on RTÉ Two on Monday, 23 September 1985 at 18:15 airing weekdays. Start time later moved to 18:30. RTE split each episode in two to fill a 30-minute slot. On 3 October 1988, to make way for Home and Away, RTE moved ACP to the main channel RTÉ One, continuing weekdays at 17:30 in a 30-minute slot. The final episode (1088) aired on 13 February 1997. Between 1998 and 2002, RTÉ rebroadcast seasons 8–10 (1988–1990). Episodes aired around midday and later moved to 09:30.

==== Norway ====
A Country Practice (called "Hverdagsliv") was broadcast on TV2 from the channel's inception in 1992 to 2000.

=== Africa ===
==== Kenya ====
A Country Practice was also transmitted on Kenyan Television (VoK now KBC) during the 1980s.

==== Zimbabwe ====
A Country Practice was broadcast on ZBC state television in the 1980s.

=== Oceania ===
==== New Zealand ====
A Country Practice was first transmitted on TV2 on the afternoon of Thursday 13 February 1986. It was shown once a week on Thursdays at 2.30pm before moving to twice a week on Wednesdays and Thursdays at 6.30pm by 1987. By 1988, the series went back to once a week on Sundays at around 4pm, and by 1989 an additional episode was broadcast on Saturdays in the same timeslot. By 1990, A Country Practice screened on Channel 2 on Saturdays and Sundays at 5pm until it moved to TV One during the final months of 1991 replacing Fair Go, where it was shown once a week on Tuesdays at 7.30pm until the end of 1992.

=== North America ===
==== Canada ====
The entire series was broadcast by CBC Television outlet CBET in Windsor, Ontario. Two episodes were broadcast daily, Monday through Friday, starting in the late 1980s, until they were caught up to contemporary episodes in the early 1990s. Its inclusion on CBET's schedule was out of necessity to fill a television schedule: Windsor was located across from the much larger American city of Detroit, Michigan, and was thus considered part of that city's TV market. The CBC network's schedule had a number of American programmes that CBET could not show as Detroit stations had often held exclusive rights to broadcast them (for example, popular game shows Wheel of Fortune and Jeopardy! had their Detroit broadcasting rights held by WDIV-TV). Many Australian soap operas, A Country Practice among them, thus found loyal audiences in the Metro Detroit area, while they otherwise remain unknown in North America.

From 1991 to 1994, the show also aired on ASN, a cable network that served Canada's Maritimes. Four hour-long episodes aired each week, from Monday to Thursday with Monday's and Tuesday's episodes repeated on Saturday and Wednesday's and Thursday's episodes on Sunday. The station aired the show from episode 1 to somewhere in the early 700s.

ASN ceased carrying the show when specialty cable channel Showcase was launched on 1 January 1995, as they picked up A Country Practice for broadcast throughout Canada. It broadcast one episode daily, from Monday to Friday, and completed the entire series run (including the 30-episode Network Ten series) in June 1999. It began rebroadcasting the entire series on 28 June 1999, with promises that the entire series would be broadcast for those who missed the first airing. However, a single line of text scrolling across the bottom of the screen during 21 August 2000, episode announced that the show would be removed from the Showcase lineup as of Monday, 28 August 2000. According to the station's email autoresponse at the time, the decision was based on "declining viewership and a demand by viewers for more current programming".

== Home media ==
=== Novels ===
Show writer Judith Colquhoun wrote and released a series of novels adapted from original scripts. Published by Corazon Books, the first novel New Beginnings was released in 2015. Set in 1981, it introduces the characters, including Dr Terence Elliott, Shirley Dean, Vicky, Frank Gilroy, and Brendan and Molly Jones. Two further novels, To Everything a Season and Silver Linings, were later released and follow storylines from episodes of the show with some slight tweaks.

=== DVD releases ===
In late 2005, MRA Entertainment announced they had obtained the rights to release the entire series on DVD. In 2008, Magna Pacific Pty Ltd bought out MRA Entertainment, with plans to release Series 6, however the rights were then acquired by Beyond Home Entertainment which then re-released the first 5 seasons in 2007–2008, followed by Season 6 in 2010. On 27 May 2020 Via Vision Entertainment announced they would be releasing season 11 on DVD on 26 August 2020.

	Episodes	Discs	Licensed to	Released
Season 1	1–14	4	MRA Entertainment	3 April 2006
Season 2, Part 1	15–44	6	MRA Entertainment	3 April 2006
Season 2, Part 2	45–106	12	MRA Entertainment	11 April 2007
Season 3, Part 1	107–148	12	MRA Entertainment	11 April 2007
Season 3, Part 2	149–190	12	MRA Entertainment	11 July 2007
Season 4, Part 1	191–236	12	MRA Entertainment	14 November 2007
Season 4, Part 2	237–280	12	MRA Entertainment	14 November 2007
Season 5, Part 1	281–318	12	MRA Entertainment	23 April 2008
Season 5, Part 2	319–356	12	MRA Entertainment	23 April 2008
Season 6, Part 1	357–400	11	Beyond Home Entertainment	7 April 2010
Season 6, Part 2	401–444	11	Beyond Home Entertainment	9 June 2010
Season 1	1–14	4	Beyond Home Entertainment	11 April 2007
Season 2 Part 1	15–44	6	Beyond Home Entertainment	11 April 2007
Season 2 Part 2	45–106	12	Beyond Home Entertainment	11 April 2007
Season 3 Part 1	107–148	12	Beyond Home Entertainment	11 April 2007
Season 3 Part 2	149–190	12	Beyond Home Entertainment	11 April 2007
Season 4 Part 1	191–236	12	Beyond Home Entertainment	14 November 2007
Season 4 Part 2	237–280	12	Beyond Home Entertainment	14 November 2007
Season 5 Part 1	281–318	12	Beyond Home Entertainment	16 April 2008
Season 5 Part 2	319–356	12	Beyond Home Entertainment	16 April 2008
Season 7, Part 1	445–488	11	Beyond Home Entertainment	5 October 2011
Season 7, Part 2	489–532	11	Beyond Home Entertainment	5 October 2011
The Early Years: Seasons 1–6	1–444	116	Beyond Home Entertainment	1 May 2013
Season 8, Part 1	533–576	11	Beyond Home Entertainment	2 January 2014
Season 8, Part 2	577–622	11	Beyond Home Entertainment	2 January 2014
Season 9, Part 1	623–666	11	Beyond Home Entertainment	5 March 2014
Season 9, Part 2	667–706	10	Beyond Home Entertainment	5 March 2014
Season 10, Part 1	707–750	11	Beyond Home Entertainment	28 April 2014
Season 10, Part 2	751–792	11	Beyond Home Entertainment	28 April 2014
The Middle Years: Seasons 7–10	445–792	87	Beyond Home Entertainment	28 April 2014
Season 11	793–882	22	Via Vision Entertainment	26 August 2020
Season 12	883–968	22	Via Vision Entertainment	21 October 2020
Season 13	969–1058	23	Via Vision Entertainment	2 December 2020
Season 14	1–30	8	Via Vision Entertainment	6 January 2021
Collection One	1–148	34	Via Vision Entertainment	17 March 2021
Collection Two	149–280	34	Via Vision Entertainment	21 April 2021
Collection Three	281–400	35	Via Vision Entertainment	19 May 2021
Collection Four	401–532	33	Via Vision Entertainment	21 July 2021
Collection Five	533–666	34	Via Vision Entertainment	18 August 2021
Collection Six	667–792	32	Via Vision Entertainment	22 September 2021
Collection Seven	793–968	44	Via Vision Entertainment	6 April 2022

=== Streaming ===
From 20 March 2020, Seasons 1–14 were made available to stream on Channel 7's streaming service 7plus.

== See also ==
- List of longest-running Australian television series
- List of longest-serving soap opera actors
