= Ray Harding =

New Zealand screenwriter (born 1949)

Ray Harding AM
- Born: Raymond Richard Harding; 1949 (age 76–77); Christchurch, New Zealand
- Education: University of Canterbury
- Occupations: Scriptwriter; producer; story editor; playwright
- Spouse: Carol
- Children: 4

Raymond Richard Harding AM (born 1949) is a New Zealand film and television scriptwriter, producer and story editor. He started his television writing career working for Crawford Productions in 1979. Harding has worked on three of Australia's most well-known soap operas; Home and Away, Neighbours and A Country Practice. He wrote the telemovies I Can't Get Started and Sisterly Love, and scripted episodes for various dramas and children's programmes, including Mirror, Mirror, The Adventures of Skippy, The Miraculous Mellops, and Blue Heelers. He also acted as a story consultant on MDA. Harding has taught at the University of London and Charles Sturt University. He is also a playwright. In 2019, Harding was appointed a Member of the Order of Australia (AM).

== Early life and family ==
Harding was born in Christchurch in 1949. His father was a publican and he grew up around hotels in New Zealand. Harding enjoyed writing from a young age and wrote a novel after he read Ian Serraillier's The Silver Sword when he was 11. He graduated from the University of Canterbury in 1972 with a Bachelor of Arts degree in English literature, and later joined the British Army as a paratrooper. He studied acting in London and taught both English and United States history at the University of Saigon. When Saigon was captured by North Vietnam forces in 1975, Harding was among the last group of people to be evacuated from the roof of the US embassy. In his mid-twenties, Harding relocated to Australia, where he married his wife Carol and they had four children.

== Career ==
Harding secured a job at Crawford Productions in 1979 and started his writing career on the Australian series Holiday Island in 1981. He wrote for both Crawford Productions and the Reg Grundy Organisation, while maintaining a job teaching. In 1984, Harding secured the job of Script Editor on A Country Practice. He wrote the 1985 PBL telemovie I Can't Get Started, about a failing author (John Waters) who regains his creativity upon meeting a shoplifter (Heather Mitchell). I Can't Get Started was Harding's first film script. He said he got the idea for the movie from the jibe "How can you be so stupid?", which was directed at him by his wife during an argument. Harding wrote three plays, and one, The Weekenders, was produced and performed in the West End.

Harding later worked on soap operas Neighbours as a writer and Home and Away as a writer, story editor, script producer, and series consultant. Harding wrote "Episode 523" of Neighbours, which features the wedding between Scott Robinson and Charlene Mitchell (played by Jason Donovan and Kylie Minogue). The episode became one of the most well-known and most watched Australian television episodes of all time. Harding wrote over 200 episodes of Home and Away with the majority written on his commute between his home in Springwood and Sydney, where the show is set and filmed. Harding wrote the wedding between Angel Brooks and Shane Parrish (playing by Melissa George and Dieter Brummer) in which a paralysed Angel leaves her wheelchair to walk down the aisle. Although viewers found it far-fetched, Harding thoroughly researched how likely it would be that Angel could walk beforehand.

Harding co-wrote the 1988 ABC telemovie Sisterly Love with Jeremy Higgins, who wrote the original script. The drama starred real-life sisters Joan Sydney and Maggie King, as siblings who reunite after twenty years apart. Barbara Hooks of The Age praised Harding and Higgins' collaboration and script, saying it was "a joy; witty and wise by turns, with a plot that fairly hums along." In the 1990s, Harding became a scriptwriter on the children's series Mirror, Mirror and The Adventures of Skippy. He also wrote episodes for The Miraculous Mellops, Blue Heelers, Water Rats, and Flipper & Lopaka. He later became a writer and story consultant on the drama series MDA. Harding has written more than 600 episodes of television across Australia, New Zealand, the UK, and Sweden.

In 1997, Harding left Home and Away to take up a teaching job at the University of London. He later returned to work on the serial, before quitting in the early 2000s as he was unhappy with the direction the network was trying take the show in. Harding then took a job teaching writing and theatre at Charles Sturt University's Bathurst campus. Harding wrote the play Asparagus with the assistance of fellow CSU lecturer Dr Robin McLachlan. The play looks at "the impact of war, politics, economic growth and the vision of three significant Australian writers on three generations of a Bathurst family." It premiered at the Bathurst Memorial Entertainment Centre in October 2003. Harding later wrote the plays Kangawomb, and A Terrible Beauty, which focuses on the 2002 Bali bombings and how it changed the portrayal of Bali in Australia.

== Credits ==
- Holiday Island (1981) – Writer
- I Can't Get Started (1985) – Writer
- A Country Practice (1985–1994) – Writer, story consultant, script editor
- Neighbours (1986–2003) – Writer
- Butterfly Island (1987) – Writer
- Home and Away (1988–2002) – Writer, story editor, script editor, script producer
- Sisterly Love (1988) – Co-writer
- The Miraculous Mellops (1991–1992) – Writer
- Bony (1992) – Writer
- The Adventures of Skippy (1992) – Writer
- Blue Heelers (1994) – Writer
- Mirror, Mirror (1995) – Writer
- Water Rats (1999) – Writer
- Flipper & Lopaka (1999) – Writer, script editor
- MDA (2002–2003) – Writer, script consultant
- Ice (2011) – Writer

== Accolades and honours ==
In 1986, Harding won the AWGIE Award for Best Script for a Television Serial for the A Country Practice episode "Lest We Forget".

In the 2019 Australia Day Honours, Harding was appointed a Member of the Order of Australia (AM), for "significant service to the broadcast media, particularly as a script writer and producer for television."

In 2021, Harding's play Kangawomb was nominated for the New Play Award at the Australian Theatre Festival NYC.
