= Gear Homestead =

Historic building in Porirua, New Zealand

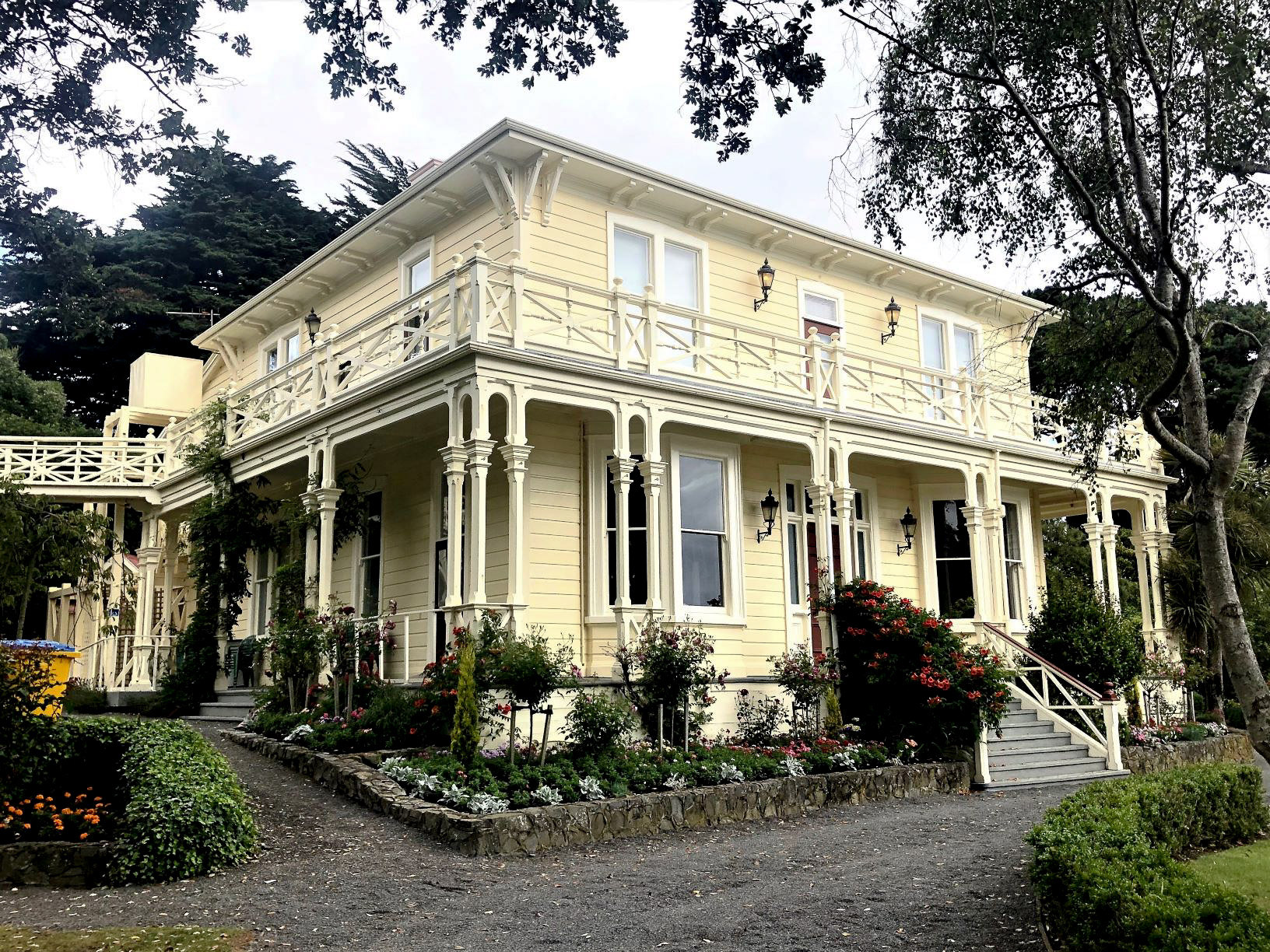
- Former names: Okowai

General information
- Location: Okowai Road, Aotea, Porirua, New Zealand
- Coordinates: 41.12326°S 174.85220°E
- Completed: 1887

Heritage New Zealand – Category 2
- Designated: 23 June 1983
- Reference no.: 1328

References
- "Gear Homestead". New Zealand Heritage List/Rārangi Kōrero. Heritage New Zealand.

Gear Homestead, named Okowai ('muddy water') by its original owner James Gear, is a historic building in Porirua, New Zealand. It was listed by the New Zealand Historic Places Trust (since renamed to Heritage New Zealand) as a Category 2 historic place in 1983.

Gear Homestead is significant because of its association with James Gear, a butcher who founded the Gear Meat Preserving and Freezing Company. The company was one of the largest employers in Wellington and also played a large part in the development of Petone.

The building was designed by Robert Edwards and built in 1887 by William Hartley. It was constructed of matai, totara and kauri, and the wall on the south side is about 30 cm thick and filled with sawdust for insulation against southerly winds. When James Gear's health declined and he needed to use a wheelchair, he had a cottage built behind the house with a ramp connecting it to the main house. He lived in the cottage with a nurse and manservant, separate from his family. The house remained in the ownership of the Gear family until 1967. In 1969 the government took 10 acres [4.05 hectares] of the property including the house for a school, and the rest of the estate was subdivided for state housing. In 1975, Porirua City Council bought the house to use as a community arts centre.

In the early to mid 1980s, the homestead was used as a major location in Peter Jackson's first film, Bad Taste. The building was home to the Iredale and Tiegan family in the 1995 children’s TV series Mirror, Mirror (TV series), and in 2007 it was used as a location in the horror movie When Night Falls.

As of 2025, the homestead is leased by Porirua City Council to a business who operate it as an event venue, bar and restaurant.
