= John Rod =

New Zealander businessman from England

John William Rod (1856–1920) was a business man in New Zealand.

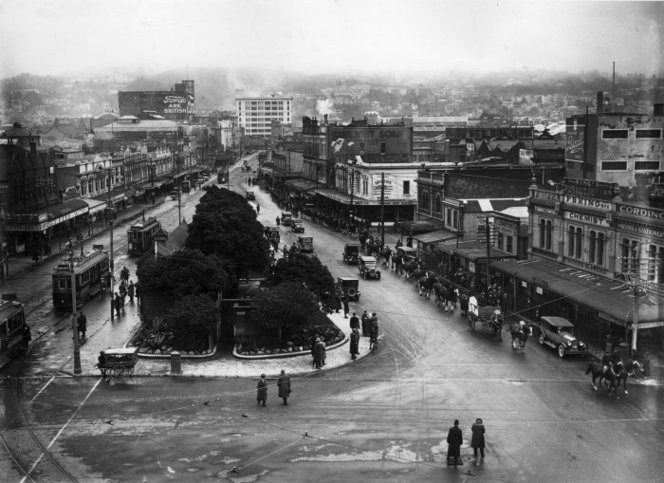
View to the west down Courtenay Place. The three story building on right side (corner of Allen St.) displaying "Sunlight Soap" advertising was built by John Rod in 1902.(_{Image courtesy of the Turnbull Library})

== Early life ==
John William Rod was born in Egham, Surrey, the son of John Rod (1827-1901), a carpenter, and Elizabeth Pickett (1829-1903). The Rod family lived in Langham Place until 1870, when they assumed the surname "George" and moved to a new home at Victoria Place, Egham. At that time, 14 year old John Rod (alias John George) was living with his parents and working as a labourer. Family historian, Shirley Ritchie (1984), suggests that he migrated to New Zealand around 1876.

== Migration to New Zealand ==
During the 1800s, many of Britain’s workers were looking toward the developing colonies in the hope of finding a better lifestyle. The New Zealand Company (NZC) took this opportunity to attract agricultural labourers and mechanics to New Zealand by offering them free passage to their new homeland. The individuals who seized this opportunity appear in the 19th Century immigration records, unfortunately, most fare paying passengers are not recorded. The date and circumstances of John Rod’s arrival in New Zealand remain unclear; however, his new life in the colony is well documented including his close links with several other migrants including: Jabez Marks, Henry Saint, Thomas Bosher and Edward Llewellyn Jones

== Later Life ==
In 1878, John married Elizabeth Bosher (1861-1942). Initially, they lived in Porirua and then moved to Johnsonville in 1887. John and Elizabeth had one son, George William Rod (1878-1938) and four daughters, Elizabeth Harriet Rod (1880–1962), Annie Eliza Rod (1882-1962), Lilly Elizabeth Rod (1885-1967) and Ann Lucy Violet Rod (1887-1972). By 1896, John's parents and his siblings had also migrated to New Zealand where they resided with him in Johnsonville. After using the alias "George" for about twenty years the family was again using the surname "Rod". In 1892, John became the guardian of his sister-in-law, Harriet Mary Jones' three young sons, moving them to his home and providing education in Johnsonville.

By 1909, John and Elizabeth had health problems and made the first of several overseas trips seeking treatment. John died on 13 January 1920 aged 63y in his home at Dr Taylor Terrace, Johnsonville and was buried in (the old) Porirua Cemetery. John's obituary noted his civic contributions and his business life, describing him as "a well-respected…man of progressive ideas".

== Business career ==
About 1876, John Rod commenced operating a slaughter yard at Porirua Ferry (now Porirua) and Ritchie (1984) states that this was also the location of his first butcher shop. His slaughter yard was probably the source of meat for the butchers shop trading as Rod Marks & Co, in Adelaide Road. In August 1879, the directors of Rod Marks & Co; John Rod, Jabez Marks and Henry Saint, attended a creditors meeting and appear to have narrowly escaped bankruptcy. Subsequently, John continued to reside at Porirua Ferry, but using Thomas Bosher's address, he offered to lease a shop and also a slaughter house and paddock. John’s brother, Henry Rod, arrived in 1884 and joined the staff of J Rod & Co later establishing his own butcher shop in Constable Street. In 1887, John took a lease to purchase a house and shop on the corner of Main Road and Railway Terrace, Johnsonville. By 1890, John's brother, James Rod, had joined him at Johnsonville and together they traded as "Rod Bros", eventually opening another butchers shop at 51 Courtenay Place. John acquired a modest butcher shop on the corner of Johnsonville Rd and Frankmoore Ave, later increasing it to two stories with the interior decorated with the same cattle themed tiles imported from England that also adorned his Courtenay Place shop. John became Vice-President of the United Butchers Association during 1900.

From 1900 to 1902, John was responsible for the construction of the first building of any importance in Courtenay Place. Situated on the eastern corner of Allen Street and Courtenay Place, "Rod's Building" is of brick construction; originally it had three stories, two large ventilators on the roof, a cellar and stables at the rear (now 23 Allen Street). However, John was frustrated by delays caused by his architect, Thomas S. Lambert, in the completion of the building and the increased building cost from an estimated £4500 to £8472. He was further incensed by Lambert’s fees, an issue that had to be resolved in the Magistrates Court. The building is now heritage listed and by 1955, it had been reduced to two stories, probably due to earthquake damage.

John built several houses in Aurora St and Dr Taylor Terrace, Johnsonville, one of which was situated on the corner of Burgess and Aurora Streets. In 1903, John was appointed to the board of directors of the Wellington and Marlborough Cement, Lime and Coal Company however, he remained a significant meat supplier operating two slaughter houses, one in Johnsonville and also at the Porirua site until it was destroyed by fire in 1908.

== Civic appointments ==
John had a keen interest in civic matters and became a JP in 1889 and in September 1898, he was elected as one of the five commissioners for the Town District of Johnsonville. He served several terms becoming Chairman of the Town Board. In 1909, he presided over negotiations to have electric lighting and power for public and private use installed in Johnsonville by Norman Heath & Co. In 1910, Rod considered proposals to provide water and drainage to the district.

== Sport ==
During the 1800s, Joshua Prosser promoted horse racing on the southern tidal flats of Porirua Harbour resulting in race events that became of national interest. John Rod was the first secretary of the Porirua Jockey Club and by 1894, he was the secretary of the Johnsonville and Hutt County Trotting Club. In 1909, he was vice president of Wellington Kennel Club.

== Court appearances ==
=== As a defendant ===
After the Christmas celebrations of 1901, John Rod appeared in Court. He was among several Johnsonville residents, including James Wareham the hotelkeeper, who were prosecuted for conducting an illegal pig and goose lottery. Their defence lawyer argued that the practice was an ancient Christmas tradition, a hereditary custom with Englishmen; however, the Judge imposed "New Zealand" fines upon all the accused. In a separate matter, John was fined for illegal operation of his Johnsonville slaughterhouse.

=== As a witness ===
In July 1902, Frances Thomas Moore threatened to kill the acting Prime Minister, Sir Joseph Ward. Moore had been appointed by the government to report on the frozen meat industry. He became irritated when vice Premier would not meet him and uncharacteristically, sent letters containing various threats similar to "remove Sir Joseph Ward as [US] President McKinley was removed." At the trial of Moore, John Rod was called as a witness. He told the Court that he had known Moore for twenty five years in business and socially. Rod was perplexed by Moore's actions testifying that the defendant was a quiet, temperate man. After reading the letters he concluded that Moore "had been studying too much and that his brain had become affected." Moore was sentenced to three years exile from New Zealand.

== Reported accidents ==
John and Elizabeth Rod with some family members were driving their trap past the Johnsonville Railway station when "the engine was started almost under the nose of their horse." The horse bolted and the trap overturned. As a result, Elizabeth, her sister and John's ward, Roy Jones, were "considerably bruised". On 7 June 1905, he was knocked down by a tram in Courtenay Place, sustaining a fractured jaw and several broken teeth. Police stated was heavily intoxicated and that when he regained consciousness he asked if he had been fighting.

== Associated migrants ==
=== Thomas Bosher ===
Thomas Bosher (1836-1921) and Harriett Beauchamp (1826-1895) lived in Egham, Surrey. They produced two sons, George and Thomas Bosher and four daughters, Elizabeth, Emily, Harriet and Catherine Bosher. Thomas (senior) was a miller's foreman; however, prior to leaving Britain, he became a professional gardener. The Bosher family were NZC sponsored passengers aboard the Waipa when it left London in December 1875. They arrived in Wellington on 2 April 1876 and took up residence in Buckle Street. Thomas continued in his adopted profession as a gardener and word spread that he had been a senior gardener at Buckingham Palace. By 1891, he had been appointed to the Committee of the Wellington Horticultural and Florists' Society. For a period of time, Thomas became Jabez Marks' debt collector and John Rod's property agent. After Harriett's death in 1895, Thomas moved to Auckland and lived with Jabez and Emily Marks until his death in 1921. The remains of Thomas, Emily and Jabez share grave 121A at Waikaraka Cemetery, Auckland.

=== Jabez Marks ===
Jabez William James Marks (1858-1938) was born in South Petherton, Somerset, the only son of Jabez and Phillis Marks. In 1877, this former "servant boy" sailed to Wellington aboard the Hurunui. Jabez was an NZC assisted migrant aged 19 and his occupation is listed as "ploughman". Soon after his arrival in Wellington, Jabez and Henry Saint formed a partnership with John Rod and opened a butchers shop in Adelaide Road. This was an ill-fated venture that almost bankrupted the trio. Consequently, by late 1879, Jabez was employed as a meat carter by James Gear. Also in 1879, Jabez married Emily Bosher (1864-1947), daughter of Thomas Bosher. Over the following decade they produced two sons and five daughters. In 1881, Jabez appointed Thomas Bosher as his Wellington debt collection agent and then moved to Auckland where he worked for Enoch Wood, a butcher in Symonds Street. Jabez took over Wood's business and then expanded into several more shops eventually forming the Auckland Meat Company with partners Oliver Nicholson and Murdoch McLean. Jabez became the president of the Master Butchers Union and he died in Auckland in November 1938.

=== Henry Saint ===
It is probable that Henry Saint (1859-1936) and Jabez Marks were acquainted before they immigrated to New Zealand. They left their respective homes in South Petherton, Somerset and boarded the Hurunui, arriving in Wellington on 12 December 1877. On the passenger list, 18 year old Henry's occupation is listed as "carpenter". Henry and Jabez appear to have lived at the back of the butcher's shop they operated in Adelaide Road, Wellington. Leah Ambrose (1860-1943) and Thomas Bosher's family were aboard the Waipa, in April 1876. Henry and Leah were married on 13 August 1879, one day after his bankruptcy hearing in the Magistrates Court. In 1882, he bought an existing butchery in Featherstone.

=== Edward Llewellyn Jones ===
Edward Llewellyn Jones (1859-1892) came from a successful Welsh-English family. He was born in Staines, Middlesex, the son of a pharmacist, Edward George Jones (1828-1837) and Anna Elizabeth Bragg (1832-1905). His grandfather was Edward Jones (1796-1835), a London trained architect and surveyor. Edward was employed as a mercantile clerk in London before his migration to New Zealand in 1884. Soon after his arrival, he married Harriet Mary Bosher and took up employment as a clerk at the Wellington Harbour Board. They lived "off Ingestre Street" where Harriett produced three sons, Edward Llewellyn Jones (1885-1949), Arthur Francis Jones (1886-1959) and Ernest Royal [Roy] Jones (1889-1933) before she died in 1890 from the kidney ailment, Brights Disease. In December 1890, Edward married his housekeeper, Lydia Marcia Nicholls (1860-1944), sister of Henry Edgar Nicholls, a well-known thespian and secretary of the Harbour Board. Lydia produced another son, Sidney Owen Jones (1891-1980); however, Edward senior died soon after when he contracted Typhoid Fever during the Te Aro epidemic of 1892. Consequently, John Rod became the guardian of Edward's three oldest sons and moved them to his home in Johnsonville. Sidney continued to live with Lydia. Francis and Roy attended Johnsonville Primary School before becoming butchers in Rod’s enterprise and later with Jabez Marks in Auckland. At the age of 10 years, Edward Llewellyn Jones (jnr) sailed back to England where his grandmother, Anna Elizabeth Jones, provided for his further education.
