= Joyce Jacobs =

British-Australian actress

- Jacobs as Esme Watson in A Country Practice (TV series)
- Born: Joyce Mary Penn; 15 April 1922; Carshalton, Surrey (now London Borough of Sutton) England, UK
- Died: 15 September 2013 (aged 91); Taren Point, New South Wales, Australia
- Occupation: Actress
- Years active: 1962–2000
- Known for: A Country Practice (TV series) as Esme Watson (Seven Network and Ten Network)
- Notable work: Number 96 (TV series) as Mrs. Daisy Carson; The Young Doctors (TV series) Muriel Palmer; All Saints (TV series) As Mavis Davis
- Spouse: David Ian Hutchinson Jacobs (m. 1946/1947 - 2011; his death)

Joyce Mary Jacobs (née Penn; 15 April 1922 – 15 September 2013) was an English-born Australian character actress, and comedienne who had a successful career on the small screen, in soap opera and serials, after emigrating there from her native England in 1962.

== Early life ==
Jacobs was born one of three siblings in Carshalton, Surrey, England to Leonard Watson Penn and Dora Elsie (née Ferrett) Penn.

She did not embark on a professional acting career until arriving in Australia in 1962.

== Career ==
Joyce is best known for her portrayals of elderly gossips. During the 1970s, she appeared in serial Number 96 as a speaking extra, often referred to as Mrs. Carson or Daisy, and appeared briefly in The Young Doctors as Muriel Palmer.

She appeared in the short film, Heaven on the 4th Floor, in 1998 opposite Bunney Brooke. She appeared in a guest episode on G.P., in the 1986 TV movie Hector's Bunyip and made a guest appearance on All Saints in 2000.

=== A Country Practice (Seven Network) ===
Jacobs remains best known for her more permanent long running role on the soap opera A Country Practice, as Esme Watson. In 1981, she appeared on the pilot episode of A Country Practice, as a character in the medical clinic called Norma, after which she returned to the series donning Edna Everage style glasses and playing Esme Watson on the long-running Seven Network series. She was originally a semi-regular, but became a regular, starting with Episode 99 in 1982. Having worked on the series for 12 years (805 episodes), she was one of the show's longest-serving actresses. She normally appeared on screen alongside fellow veteran actors Syd Heylen and Gordon Piper, although, unlike the latter actors who were written out of the series toward the end of its run on Network Seven to make way for a younger revamped cast, she was retained in the series.

=== A Country Practice (Ten Network) ===
In 1994, Network Ten continued the series under the same title, but with a new setting and a mostly new cast. Jacobs, however, along with Joan Sydney (as matron) and Andrew Blackman as Dr. Harry Morrison, reprised her role of Esme Watson. The new version was not as successful as the original and was cancelled after 30 episodes.

== Personal life ==
After retirement, in an interview with the magazine Woman's Day in 2012 she revealed that he had been battling Parkinson's disease for 10 years. After her husband of 64 years, David Ian Hutchinson Jacobs, died in 2011, she resided in a rest home facility, Goodhew Gardens, Taren Point, where she celebrated her 90th birthday with fellow cast members.

Jacobs died aged 91, on 21 September 2013.

== Filmography ==
=== Television ===
Year	Title	Role	Notes
2011	Today Tonight	Herself	TV series, 1 episode
2006	TV Turns 50: The Events That Stopped A Nation	Guest - Herself with 'A Country Practice' cast: Lorrae Desmond, Brian Wenzel, Joan Sydney, Shane Porteous, Anne Tenney, Josephine Mitchell & Emily Nichol	TV Special
1998-2000	All Saints	Mavis Davis	2 episodes
1996	G.P.	Jean Oswald	1 episode
1995	Sale of the Century: Battle of the TV Classics	Herself	TV series, 1 episode
1995	Coverstory	Vriendin Denise	1 episode
1994	A Country Practice	Esme Watson	29 episodes (Network 10)
1981-1993	A Country Practice	Esme Watson / Norma	805 episodes (Seven Network)
1981	The Young Doctors	Muriel Palmer	1 episode
1979	Number 96	Mrs Carson	1 episode

=== Film ===
Year	Title	Role	Notes
1998	Heaven on the 4th Floor	Joyce Williams	Short film
1986	Hector's Bunyip	Ivy Clements	TV movie
