= Hector's Bunyip =

1986 Australian television film

- Written by: Judith Colquhoun
- Directed by: Mark Callan
- Starring: Robert Coleby; Barbara Stephens; Gordon Piper; Tushka Bergen
- Country of origin: Australia
- Original language: English

Production
- Producer: Helen Boyd
- Running time: 93 mins
- Production company: JNP Films
- Budget: $530,000

Original release
- Release: 1986

Hector's Bunyip, is a 1986 Australian TV movie about a young boy who is abducted by a bunyip.

== Synopsis ==
Six year old Hector in the youngest of three children in a poor foster family. His best friend is an imaginary creature he calls 'Bunyip'. One day a child welfare officer mistakenly deems the family home unsuitable for Hector, and makes arrangements for him to be placed in the care of an orphanage, but before the agency can follow through, Hector mysteriously 'disappears'. In reality, the family has hidden Hector, claiming he was taken by the 'Bunyip' - with the hope that in the meantime the counselor will change her mind.

== Cast ==
- Robert Coleby as George Bailey
- Barbara Stephens as Irene Bailey
- Gordon Piper as Jack Benson
- Tushka Bergen as Pandora Bailey
- Denise Roberts as Gladys Glum
- Joan Sydney as Maude Trembalt
- Joyce Jacobs as Ivy Clements
- Todd Boyce as Constable Gilbert Goode
- Syd Heylen as Chooka Morris
- Brian Moll as Ernest Sister

== Production ==
The film was shot in the lower Hunter Valley in New South Wales, Australia . It was aired on WonderWorks.
