= Broadmeadows, New Zealand =

Suburb of Wellington City, New Zealand

Broadmeadows
- Suburb
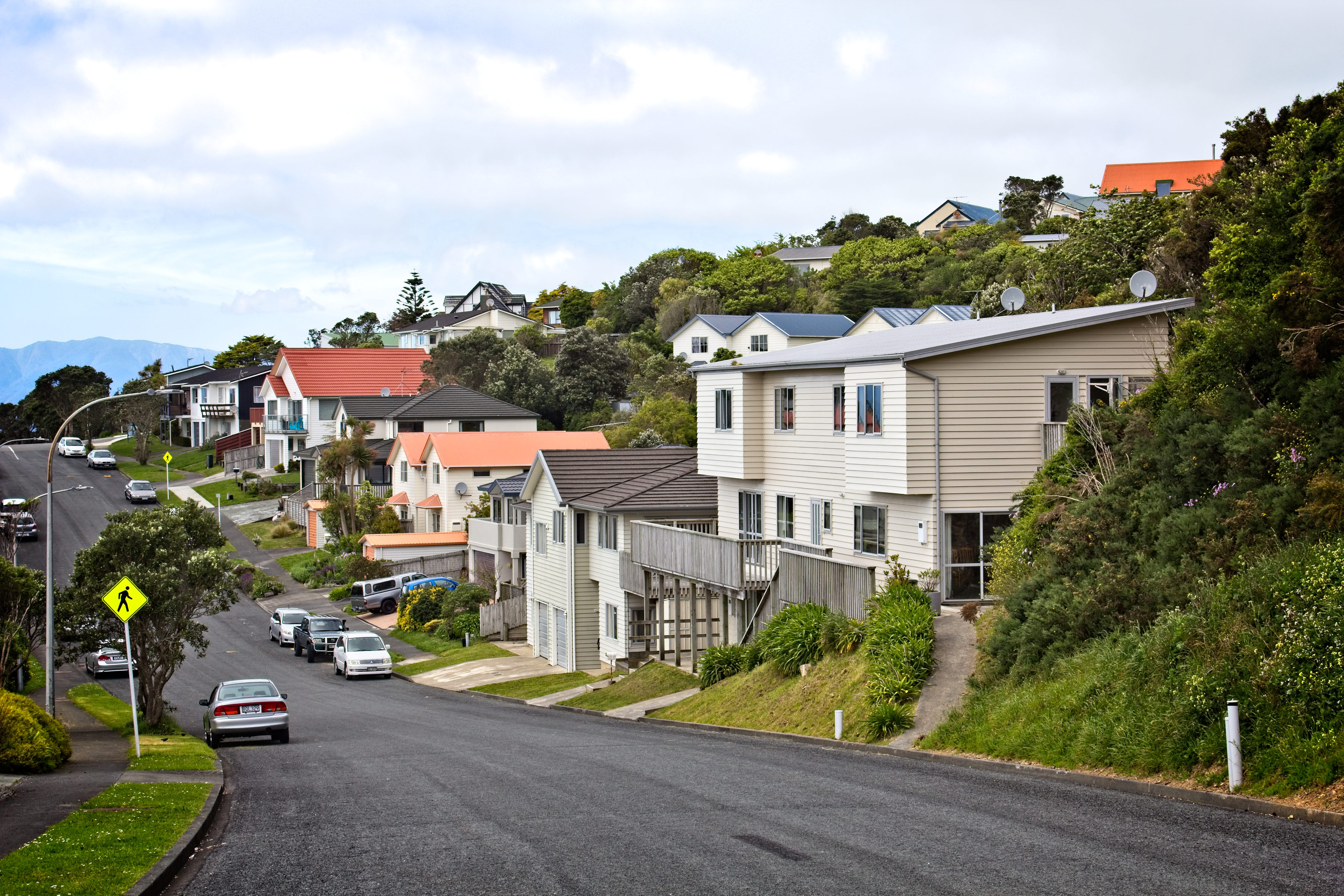
- Representative street in Broadmeadows
- Interactive map of Broadmeadows
- Coordinates: 41.2373317°S 174.7961818°E
- Country: New Zealand
- City: Wellington
- Local authority: Wellington City Council
- Electoral ward: Wharangi/Onslow-Western; Te Whanganui-a-Tara Māori Ward

Area
  - Land: 64 ha (160 acres)

Population (June 2025)
  - Total: 1,740
  - Density: 2,700/km^{2} (7,000/sq mi)
- Postcode(s): 6035, 6037

	Johnsonville	Johnsonville, Newlands
Mount Kaukau	Broadmeadows	Ngauranga
	Khandallah

Broadmeadows is a minor western suburb of Wellington, New Zealand. It is located to the north of Khandallah and south of Johnsonville. It is located 7 kilometres (4.3 mi) from the Wellington central business district. Despite its name suggesting that the area was once flat open fields, the suburb was created on steeply sloping hills and features the highest streets within Wellington City with a number of houses located more than 300m above sea level. Broadmeadows has a population of 1,635.

== Facilities ==
=== Parks and reserves ===
The Skyline Walkway provides access to Mount Kaukau.

== Politics ==
=== Local government ===
In local government Broadmeadows forms part of the Onslow-Western Ward. The ward is represented by Diane Calvert, Simon Woolf and Rebecca Matthews as of 2020.

=== National government ===
In national government Broadmeadows is part of the Ōhāriu general electorate represented by Greg O'Connor of the New Zealand Labour Party since 2017. Broadmeadows is in the Te Tai Tonga Māori electorate represented by Tākuta Ferris (Māori) since 2023.

== Demographics ==
Broadmeadows statistical area covers 0.64 km^{2} (0.25 sq mi). It had an estimated population of 1,740 as of June 2025, with a population density of 2,719 people per km^{2}.

Historical population
Year	Pop.	±% p.a.
2006	1,485	—
2013	1,536	+0.48%
2018	1,629	+1.18%
2023	1,689	+0.73%

Broadmeadows had a population of 1,689 in the 2023 New Zealand census, an increase of 60 people (3.7%) since the 2018 census, and an increase of 153 people (10.0%) since the 2013 census. There were 834 males, 843 females, and 12 people of other genders in 597 dwellings. 4.8% of people identified as LGBTIQ+. The median age was 36.9 years (compared with 38.1 years nationally). There were 276 people (16.3%) aged under 15 years, 378 (22.4%) aged 15 to 29, 831 (49.2%) aged 30 to 64, and 201 (11.9%) aged 65 or older.

People could identify as more than one ethnicity. The results were 62.2% European (Pākehā); 7.8% Māori; 4.6% Pasifika; 32.3% Asian; 2.8% Middle Eastern, Latin American and African New Zealanders (MELAA); and 3.0% other, which includes people giving their ethnicity as "New Zealander". English was spoken by 94.7%, Māori by 2.5%, Samoan by 1.4%, and other languages by 30.4%. No language could be spoken by 2.5% (e.g. too young to talk). New Zealand Sign Language was known by 0.4%. The percentage of people born overseas was 42.3, compared with 28.8% nationally.

Religious affiliations were 30.7% Christian, 5.3% Hindu, 2.7% Islam, 0.4% Māori religious beliefs, 1.6% Buddhist, 0.2% New Age, 0.2% Jewish, and 2.5% other religions. People who answered that they had no religion were 50.8%, and 5.7% of people did not answer the census question.

Of those at least 15 years old, 684 (48.4%) people had a bachelor's or higher degree, 558 (39.5%) had a post-high school certificate or diploma, and 171 (12.1%) people exclusively held high school qualifications. The median income was $60,200, compared with $41,500 nationally. 360 people (25.5%) earned over $100,000 compared to 12.1% nationally. The employment status of those at least 15 was 900 (63.7%) full-time, 177 (12.5%) part-time, and 27 (1.9%) unemployed.

== Transport ==
Broadmeadows is connected to central Wellington by Metlink buses. Bus 24 connects Johnsonville and Broadmeadows to the CBD and goes via Courtenay Place to Miramar Heights.
