= Daisy Hill Farm House =

Historic building

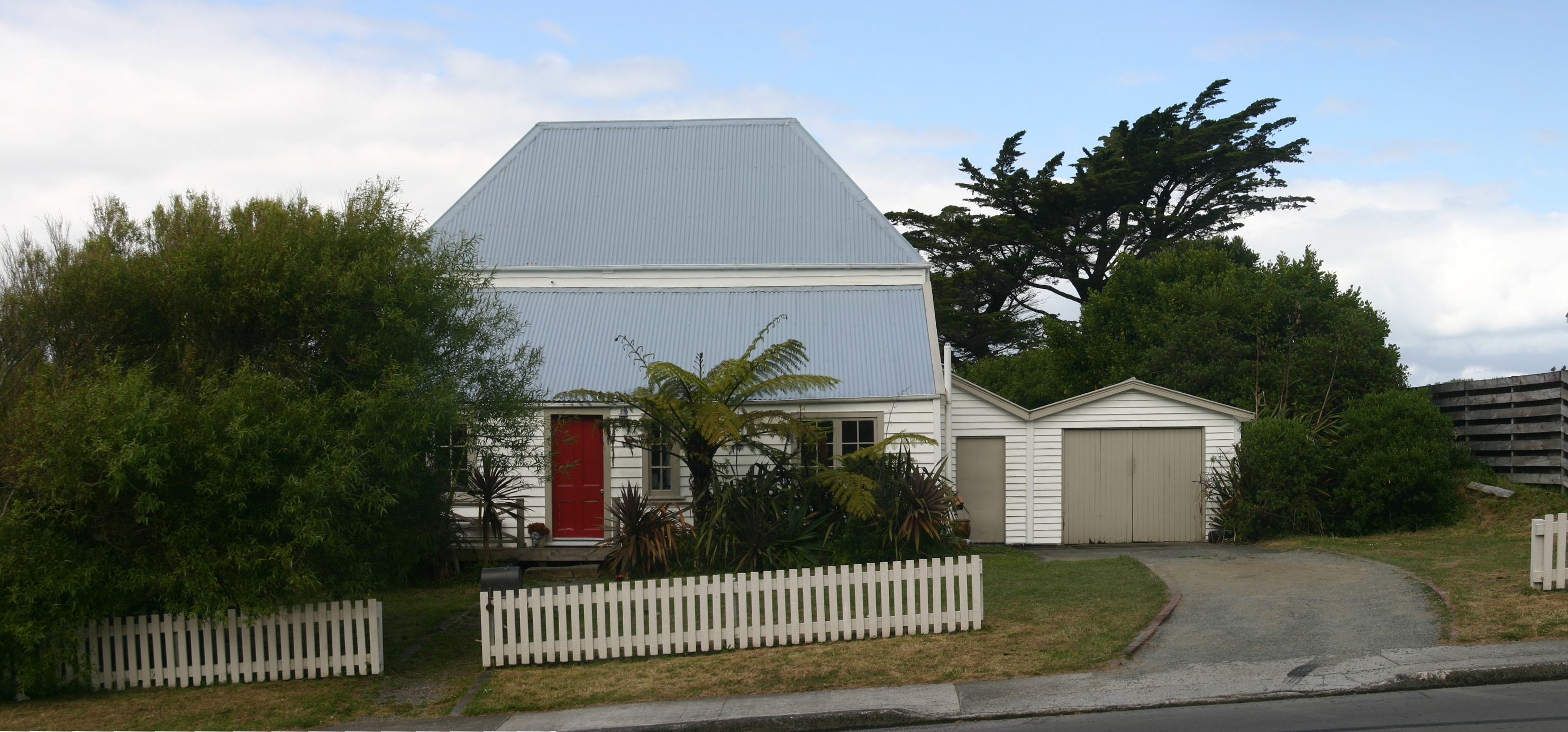
- street view (rear of house)
- Interactive map of the Daisy Hill Farm House area

General information
- Location: 15 Truscott Avenue, Johnsonville, Wellington, New Zealand
- Coordinates: 41.226107°S 174.795983°E
- Completed: 1857

Heritage New Zealand – Category 1
- Designated: 25-Sep-1986
- Reference no.: 4110

Daisy Hill Farm House is a historic building in Johnsonville, Wellington, New Zealand.

The house was built in about 1860 for Robert Bould, a pioneer farmer. He came to New Zealand with the New Zealand Company in the early 1840s and bought land for a sheep farm in Johnsonville in 1853.

Between the world wars, the sheep farm became a dairy farm, run by Hayes and later Martelli. The land supported nearly forty Jerseys, brindles and Ayrshires without extra crops for feed.

Built in a simplified Georgian style, it is one of the few remaining houses of this type in Wellington. The building is classified as a Category 1 Historic Place (places of "special or outstanding historical or cultural heritage significance or value") by Heritage New Zealand.

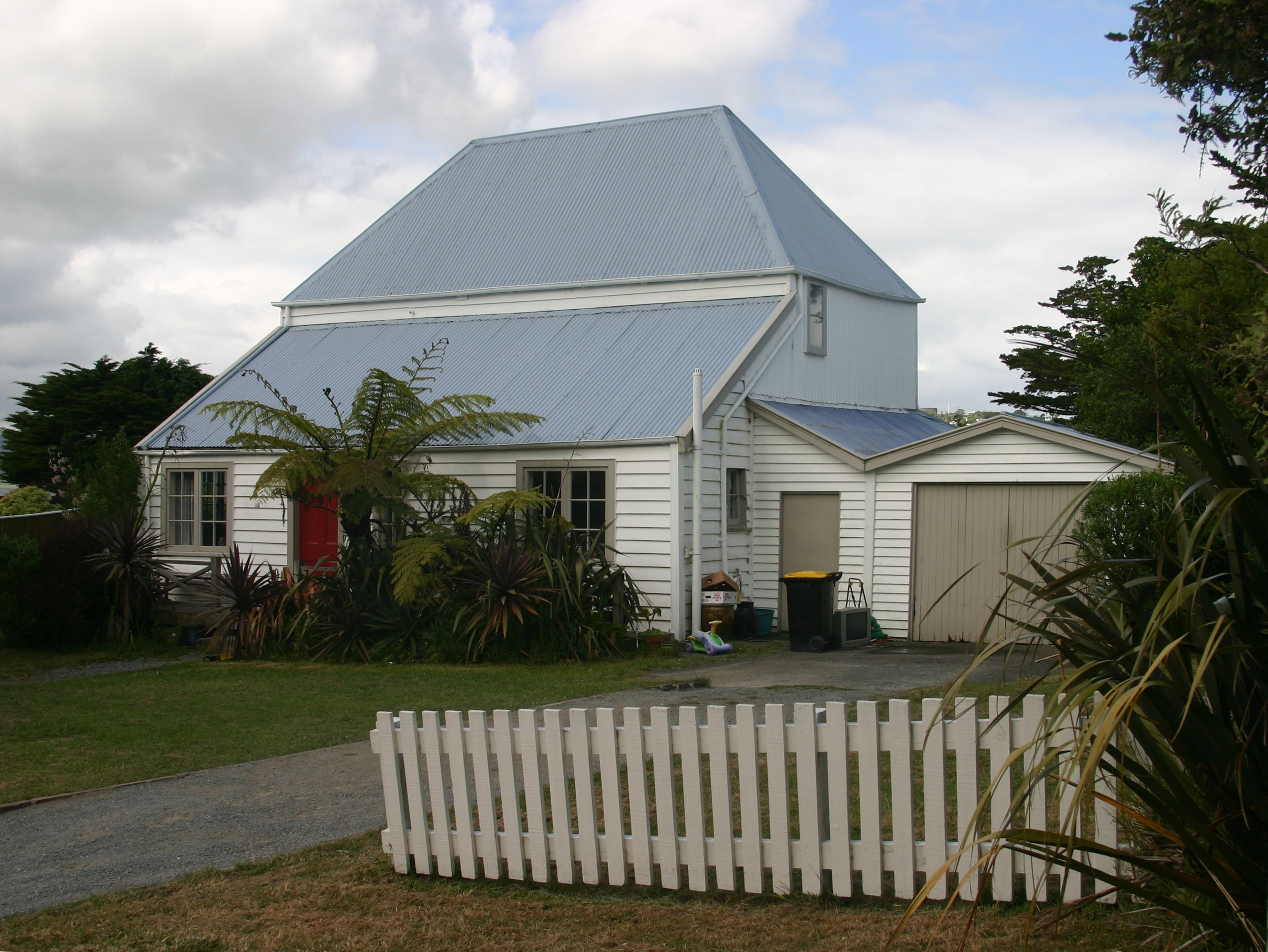
Daisy hill farm house (view of rear from street)
