= Sisterly Love =

- Written by: Ray Harding; Jeremy Higgins
- Directed by: Mark DeFriest
- Starring: Joan Sydney; Maggie King; Martin Vaughan
- Country of origin: Australia
- Original language: English

Production
- Producer: Peter Du Cane
- Running time: 80 minutes

Original release
- Network: ABC
- Release: 24 December 1989

Sisterly Love is a 1987 Australian television film shot in Western Australia. Nominated for 3 AFI (Australian Film Institute) Awards in 1988 including Best Telefeature. It was also the pilot for an unmade series.

== Premise ==
Two sisters, Jean and Sylvia, have been separated over twenty years. Sylvia lives next door to Bob. When Jean is widowed, she visits Sylvia and old troubles re-emerge. Sylvia has a son Martin who is dating Birdy.

== Cast ==
- Joan Sydney as Jean
- Maggie King as Sylvia
- Martin Vaughan as Bob
- Matthew Parkinson as Martin
- Sandra Eldridge as Birdy

== Production ==
Stars Joan Sydney and Maggie King are sisters in real life. Filming was to have begun in September 1987 but was held up to due a union ban over the use of a British first assistant director.

It was filmed in Fremantle, Rottnest Island, and Kings Park.

== Reception ==
The Sydney Morning Herald gave it a poor review. The Age called it "perfectly charming".
