= Johnsonville, New Zealand =

Suburb of Wellington City, New Zealand

Johnsonville
- Suburb
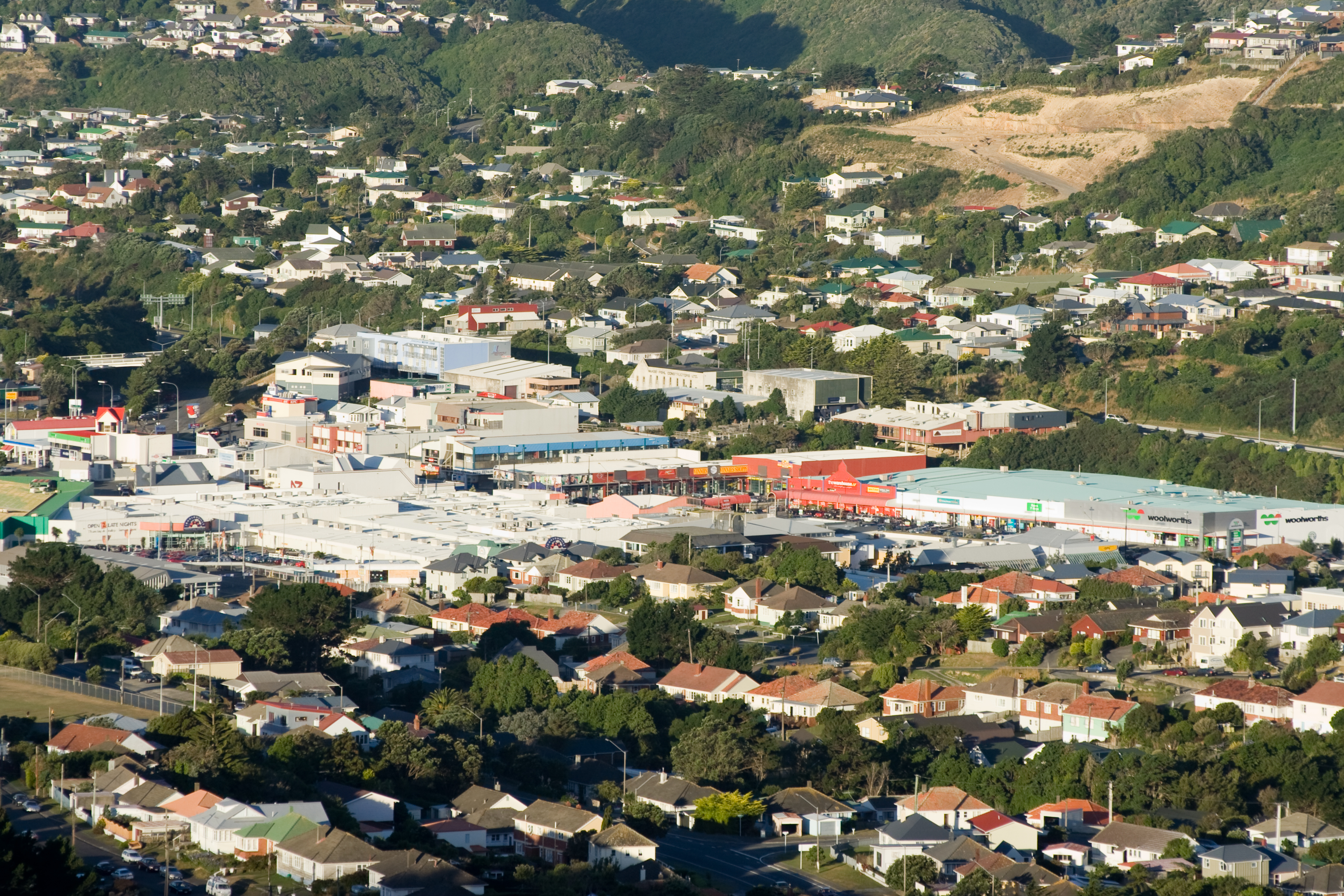
- Johnsonville shopping area
- Interactive map of Johnsonville
- Coordinates: 41°13′25″S 174°48′26″E
- Country: New Zealand
- City: Wellington
- Local authority: Wellington City Council
- Electoral ward: Takapū/Northern Ward; Te Whanganui-a-Tara Māori Ward

Area
  - Land: 373 ha (920 acres)

Population (June 2025)
  - Total: 12,150
  - Density: 3,260/km^{2} (8,440/sq mi)
- Postcode: 6037
- Railway stations: Johnsonville railway station

Ohariu Valley	Churton Park	Paparangi
Mount Kaukau	Johnsonville	Johnsonville–Porirua Motorway, Newlands
Broadmeadows, Khandallah	Ngauranga Gorge

Johnsonville is a large suburb in northern Wellington, New Zealand. It is seven kilometres north of the city centre, at the top of the Ngauranga Gorge, on the main route to Porirua (State Highway 1). It is commonly known by locals as "J'ville". Johnsonville was settled from the 1840s, became a town by 1896 and grew rapidly during the twentieth century. Johnsonville became an independent town district in 1908 and amalgamated with Wellington City in 1953.

== History ==
=== Johnson's clearing ===
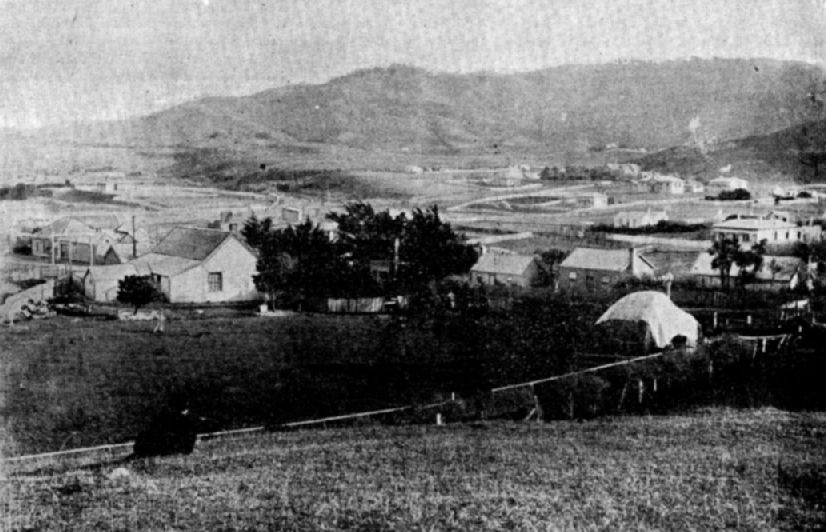
Johnsonville around 1885

Johnsonville was originally the site of a Māori track from Wellington to Porirua (the Old Porirua Road), and had no indigenous inhabitants prior to European settlement. Vegetation was dense native forest, dominated by tōtara, mixed podocarp trees (notably tōtara and rimu), rātā and hīnau. Johnsonville was settled in 1841 by, among others, Frank Johnson who had purchased a certificate of selection and had drawn the 100 acre 'Section 11 Kinapora (Kenepuru) District'. Initially called 'Johnson's clearing', Frank Johnson built a house by the Johnsonville stream and a timber mill near the centre of modern Johnsonville. He quickly denuded the entire Johnsonville area of virgin native forest, with timber sold to help build the nearby town of Wellington. He soon sold his land at a substantial profit, and returned to England by 1858 leaving the environment massively changed, and on which site a farming industry to support nearby Wellington City grew. The Daisy Hill Farm House was built about 1860, and is still standing.

Over the 20th century, farmland slowly gave way to suburbia, with the first tiny township of Johnsonville steadily growing to become populated principally by a "mid-level" socio-economic strata. Johnsonville was a town by 1896.

=== 1886: the railway arrives ===
The opening of the railway to Wellington by the Wellington and Manawatu Railway Company in 1886 (see Johnsonville Branch and Johnsonville Station) enabled people to commute to Wellington, and the line was electrified with more frequent and faster trains in 1938.

About 1894 stockyards were built in Broderick Road adjacent to the station sidings by Freeman R. Jackson. Stock (cattle and sheep) railed from the Manawatu and elsewhere were driven through the streets and down Fraser Avenue to the Ngauranga abattoir. The suburb got the name "Cowtown", and residents complained about hygiene and noise. So a new siding and stockyard was opened near Raroa station in 1958.

=== Town Board ===
Johnsonville was proclaimed a local board in 1874. From 1881 it was a dependent town district, renamed in 1887 the Johnsonville Town District. In 1908 the Town Board became independent. In 1909 John Rod, Chairman of the Town Board, negotiated for electric power; supplied by the Hutt Valley Electric Power Board and installed in Johnsonville by Norman Heath & Co. The board was active in the 1912-1922 period when gas lighting and drainage were installed and streets kerbed and channeled. In 1912 a water reservoir was built for water supplied from Ohariu Valley, and a new reservoir built in 1922. Drainage installed in 1912 was to a septic tank in Ngauranga Gorge. The septic tank lasted to 1953; when Johnsonville amalgamated with the Wellington City Council in April and the council completed a main sewer to the area. Surrounding areas also joined Wellington; like Raroa, which had been in the Hutt County Council.

The Town Board area was extended to the Hawtrey Estate north of Ironside Road from 1 April 1932, and the board installed some standpipes to fill water buckets.

The population grew from 143 in 1874 to 206 in 1878 and 438 (in 83 dwellings) in 1897. The population almost doubled between 1901 (502) and 1911, and was just over 3000 by 1951. In 1976 it was 9230; a 37% increase 1956-66 and 106% increase 1966–76.

=== Wellington suburb ===
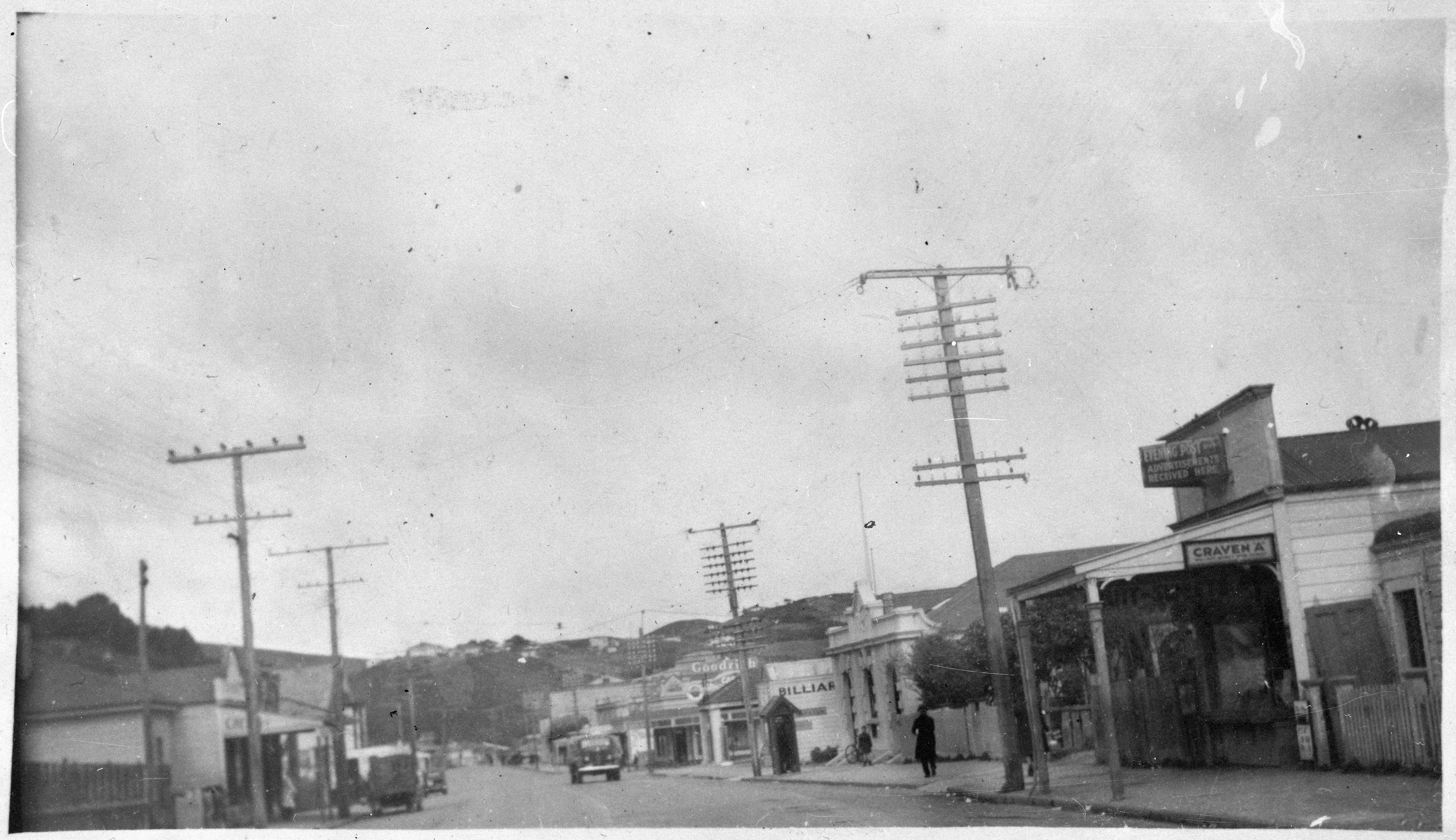
A street in Johnsonville in 1943

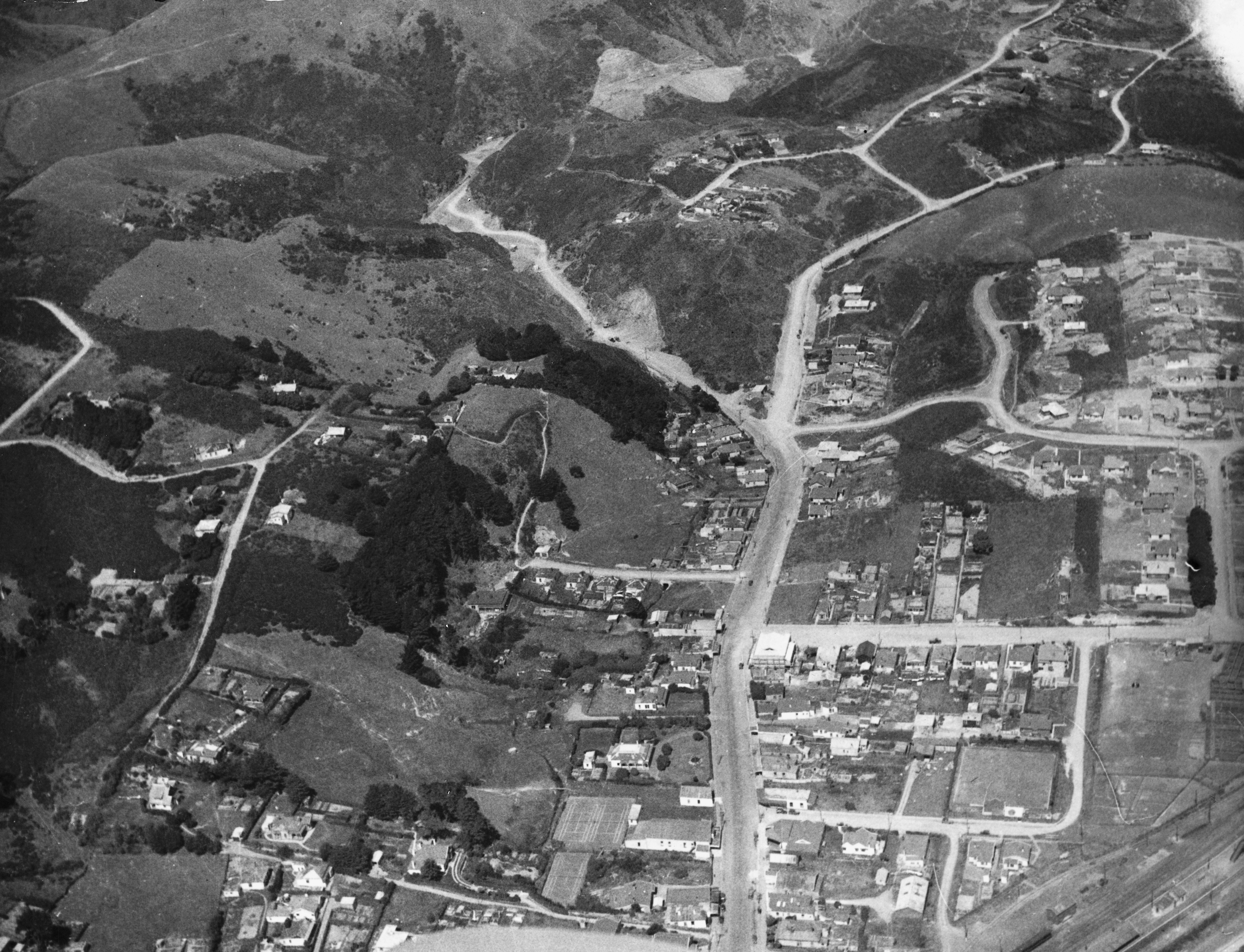
An aerial view of Johnsonville in 1939

The town grew rapidly from 1938 with state houses built on the former Native Reserve between Broderick Road and Fraser Avenue; the first was built in Bould Street. From 1938 to 1956, 329 state houses were built.

In the 1960s, the first shopping mall in the Wellington region was built in Johnsonville.

== Demographics ==
Johnsonville, comprising the statistical areas of Johnsonville West, Johnsonville North, Johnsonville Central and Johnsonville South, covers 3.73 km^{2} (1.44 sq mi). It had an estimated population of 12,150 as of June 2025, with a population density of 3,257 people per km^{2}.

Historical population
Year	Pop.	±% p.a.
2006	9,240	—
2013	10,239	+1.48%
2018	11,112	+1.65%
2023	11,520	+0.72%

Johnsonville had a population of 11,520 in the 2023 New Zealand census, an increase of 408 people (3.7%) since the 2018 census, and an increase of 1,281 people (12.5%) since the 2013 census. There were 5,640 males, 5,790 females, and 90 people of other genders in 4,215 dwellings. 5.3% of people identified as LGBTIQ+. The median age was 36.3 years (compared with 38.1 years nationally). There were 2,010 people (17.4%) aged under 15 years, 2,451 (21.3%) aged 15 to 29, 5,655 (49.1%) aged 30 to 64, and 1,401 (12.2%) aged 65 or older.

People could identify as more than one ethnicity. The results were 58.4% European (Pākehā); 10.9% Māori; 6.5% Pasifika; 33.0% Asian; 3.0% Middle Eastern, Latin American and African New Zealanders (MELAA); and 2.1% other, which includes people giving their ethnicity as "New Zealander". English was spoken by 94.7%, Māori by 3.1%, Samoan by 2.0%, and other languages by 28.2%. No language could be spoken by 2.1% (e.g. too young to talk). New Zealand Sign Language was known by 0.4%. The percentage of people born overseas was 39.8, compared with 28.8% nationally.

Religious affiliations were 32.7% Christian, 5.5% Hindu, 2.6% Islam, 0.5% Māori religious beliefs, 2.2% Buddhist, 0.4% New Age, 0.3% Jewish, and 1.8% other religions. People who answered that they had no religion were 49.3%, and 4.9% of people did not answer the census question.

Of those at least 15 years old, 3,900 (41.0%) people had a bachelor's or higher degree, 3,882 (40.8%) had a post-high school certificate or diploma, and 1,719 (18.1%) people exclusively held high school qualifications. The median income was $53,900, compared with $41,500 nationally. 1,872 people (19.7%) earned over $100,000 compared to 12.1% nationally. The employment status of those at least 15 was 5,640 (59.3%) full-time, 1,080 (11.4%) part-time, and 258 (2.7%) unemployed.

Individual statistical areas
Name	Area (km^{2})	Population	Density (per km^{2})	Dwellings	Median age	Median income
Johnsonville West	0.89	3,471	3,900	1,185	37.0 years	$55,500
Johnsonville North	1.18	3,282	2,781	1,149	36.2 years	$56,600
Johnsonville Central	0.95	2,853	3,003	1,146	34.6 years	$52,700
Johnsonville South	0.71	1,914	2,696	732	38.8 years	$49,100
New Zealand					38.1 years	$41,500

== Infrastructure ==
Johnsonville has a modestly large commercial infrastructure; it has a shopping mall, two supermarkets, a library, and a community hub.

=== Retail ===
Johnsonville Shopping Centre consists of 500 carparks and 70 shops, including a Countdown supermarket. Johnsonville Shopping Centre is part of the Stride Property Limited portfolio and (as of December 2023) was owned 50/50 with Diversified NZ Property Trust, and managed by Stride Investment Management Limited.

=== Public transport ===
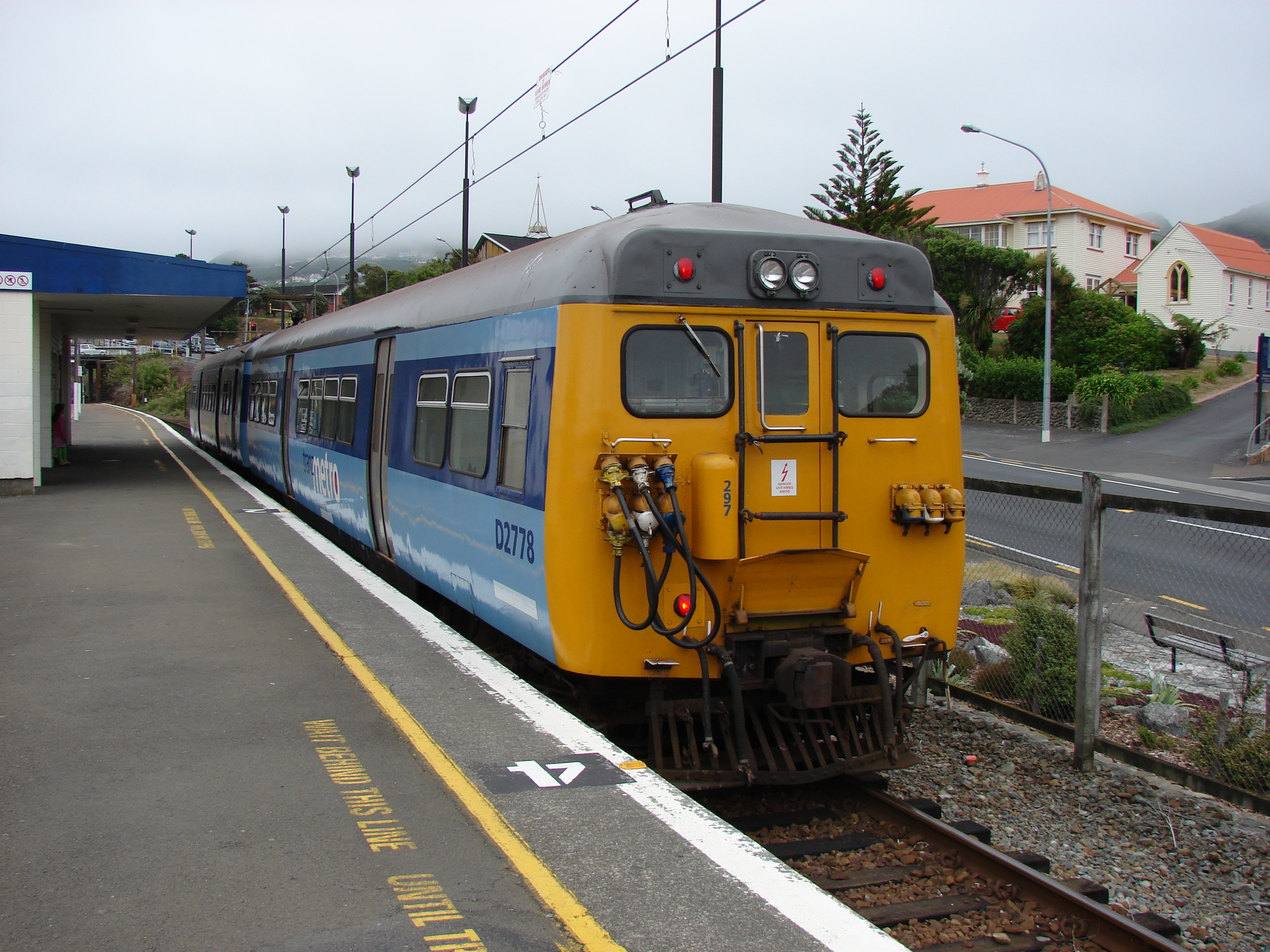
A train at Johnsonville Railway Station in 2007

Johnsonville is a reasonably large residential and commercial suburb. Johnsonville Station is the northern terminus of the Johnsonville branch line of the Tranz Metro electric passenger service to central Wellington, with an adjacent bus stop for several routes known as the Johnsonville Hub. Johnsonville supports a large commuter population. Housing is spread around the shopping hub in the centre and extends out to the base of Mt Kaukau to the west, and out across the hill towards the suburb of Newlands to the south-east.

=== Keith Spry Pool ===
Keith Spry pool is an indoor 25 metre heated pool with a diving pool, toddler pool, spa, and sauna: opened in June 1982. The pool is run by Wellington City Council. In June 2013, work started on a $6 million revamp of the facilities which expanded the complex by 50 percent, adding a new learn to swim pool, replacing the roof and expanding the changing rooms.

=== Community Centre ===
The Johnsonville Community Centre is located on the corner of Frankmoore Avenue and Moorefield Road and provides community services including education, Citizens Advice Bureau, support groups and youth groups. The building is owned by the Wellington City Council and was opened in 1995, after significant investment and fund raising by local community groups.

=== Waitohi community hub ===
The Waitohi Hub in 2026

A major new multi-level community facility named Waitohi was opened in December 2019. The design integrates Keith Spry Pool with new premises for the Johnsonville Library, a cafe, the Whānau Manaaki kindergarten and also links with the existing Johnsonville Community Centre.

=== Regional planning ===
As a part of the Northern Growth Management Plan from Wellington City Council, there exists a proposal to redevelop Johnsonville's main precinct into the "Johnsonville Town Centre". This plan recognises Johnsonville as Wellington's most economically important commercial and population hub outside the city centre. The plan recommends the creation of a unique and identifiable Johnsonville culture around the triangular precinct - bounded by Johnsonville Road to the east, Broderick Road to the south and Moorefield Road to the west.

=== Alex Moore Park ===
Alex Moore park is a sporting ground located on Broderick Road / Moorefield Road. The grounds host football, rugby, cricket, softball and athletics. The facilities include an artificial football pitch, and cricket nets. A new sport and community hub named Waiora, was opened in March 2021 as a replacement for disparate and outdated sports clubrooms. The new facility is shared by five sporting groups, the Wellington Deaf Association and the Wellington City Council.

== Education ==
=== School enrolment zones ===
Johnsonville is within the enrolment zones for Onslow College, Newlands College, St Oran's College, Raroa Normal Intermediate and Johnsonville School.

=== Secondary education ===
Johnsonville is home to the co-educational high school Onslow College. It has a roll of 1,187 as of July 2026. It opened in 1956.

=== Primary and intermediate education ===
Johnsonville has one intermediate school and several primary schools:

- Raroa Normal Intermediate is a state intermediate school with a roll of 527. It opened in 1971.
- Johnsonville School is a contributing state primary school with a roll of 344. Established in 1867, it is one of the oldest state primary schools in New Zealand. It opened in 1929.
- St Brigids School is a contributing state-integrated Catholic primary school with a roll of 290.
- West Park School is a contributing state primary school with a roll of 246. It opened in 1956.

== Nearby suburbs ==
The residents of nearby suburbs such as Churton Park, Grenada Village, Newlands, Khandallah, Ngaio, Raroa and Broadmeadows also use Johnsonville's facilities - especially for shopping at the Johnsonville Shopping Centre. While many of these centres have new supermarkets, the range of shops available in Johnsonville is a major attraction to the wider district.

== Notable people ==
- John Rod, Johnsonville resident
