= Syd Heylen =

Australian actor and comedian

- Heylen in TV series A Country Practice as Cookie Locke
- Born: Harold Sydney Charles Heylen; 25 May 1923; Renmark, South Australia, Australia
- Died: 4 December 1996 (aged 73); Queensland, Australia
- Other name: Sydney Heylen
- Occupations: Actor; comedian; variety performer
- Years active: c. 1939–1996
- Known for: A Country Practice as Vernon "Cookie" Locke
- Notable work: Arcade; Sunnyside Up; Mad Max 2
- Spouses: Dorothy Plater (m. 1944, divorced); Patti Brittain (m. 1961)
- Children: 2

Syd Heylen (25 May 1923 – 4 December 1996), born as Harold Sydney Charles Heylen) credited variously as Syd Heylen, Sid Heylen and Sydney Heylen, was an Australian character actor of radio, stage, television and film, comedian, and variety performer and soldier, he often performed in a traditional vaudeville style in the vein of Roy Rene.

== Early life ==
Heylen was born in Renmark, South Australia in 1923, as the only son of a carpenter, he had 4 sisters. He joined the Australian Army at 16 and served on the Kokoda Trail in PNG under the rank of Private in the 39th Infantry Battalion. A war-time entertainer and comic, he went on to join the 1st army entertainment troupe.

== Career ==
=== Film and TV ===
Heylen went into vaudeville after World War II and as one of Australian television's early performers in 1956 starred in the television variety show The Show of Stars with Hal Lashwood and John Ewart.

He became popular during the 1960s on television as a regular performer on the Seven Network HSV-7 variety show Sunnyside Up for 10 years, appearing as 'Sydney from Sydney'. He teamed up with other comics, such as Honest John Gilbert, Maurie Fields, and Val Jellay presenting comedy sketches in between the musical items. Recycling his vaudeville shtick, Heylen specialised in stooges prone to cheekiness, drunkenness, pratfalls and spit takes.

Heylen was best known for his role in A Country Practice, as the RSL club manager, barman and chef Vernon 'Cookie' Locke, who he played from 1982 until 1992, alongside Gordon Piper as his mate Bob Hatfield. Cookie and Bob were styled as a version of The Odd Couple, with Cookie as the slob and Bob as the neat one. In the series he was briefly engaged to town gossip Esme Watson (Joyce Jacobs) He was cast as Cookie after the series creator and executive producer James Davern saw him in the ill-fated TV series Arcade in 1980 alongside Lorrae Desmond, whom he would also cast in ACP. Heylen was written out of the series in 1992 alongside Gordon Piper), as the producers wanted to concentrate on a younger cast and an updated formula. Davern would later regret dropping Cookie and Bob, as they were two of the show's central older characters who provided many of the comedy scenes between the more dramatic storylines.

Heylen appeared in numerous smaller television series roles including Crawford Production staples Matlock Police, Homicide and Division 4 in each case in 5 different roles, as well as Alvin Purple. storylines. Heylen also acted in the soap opera The Box playing a fast-talking television sportscaster.

Heylen played a minor role in the film Mad Max 2 as Curmudgeon.

=== Music ===
In the 1980s, he released a number of albums on vinyl: a spoken word album with comedian/entertainer Maurie Fields and a collaboration with ACP co-star Lorrae Desmond and music albums including "Cookie" featuring jazz, world music, folk, country and stage and screen tunes and containing songs such as covers like Patsy Cline's "Who's Sorry Now?", to which the D-Generation quipped "anyone who bought the album".

== Personal life and death ==
Heylen was first married to Dorothy Pearl Platter in 1944 however they divorced, and he remarried entertainer Patricia Anne Brittain in 1964 and had 2 children - son Syd Heylen Jr., an entertainer mostly in vaudeville and cabaret and daughter Julie, also in the entertainment business.

After he left A Country Practice in 1992, he and his wife Patricia retired to their Gold Coast, Queensland home. Occasionally he would do public appearances and performances. He died from a stroke on 4 December 1996.

== Recognition ==
Heylen was a patron and performer for the Variety Club Australia, where he was awarded as The First National Living Treasure.

== Filmography ==
=== Film ===
| Year | Tiitle | Role | Notes |
|---|---|---|---|
| 1977 | Listen to the Lion | Hunter's Friend | Short film |
| 1980 | Stir | Old Bob | Feature film |
| 1981 | Mad Max 2 | Curmudgeon | Feature film |
| 1982 | Starstruck | Pub guest | Feature film |
| 1982 | Ginger Meggs | Stablehand | Feature film |
| 1986 | Hector's Bunyip | Chooka Morris | TV movie |

=== Television ===
| Year | Tiitle | Role | Notes |
|---|---|---|---|
| 1982-92 | A Country Practice | Vernon 'Cookie' Locke | TV series, episode: 726 |
| 1974 | Division 4 | Jack Murray, Williams, Herbie Ross, Shake, Arthur Stone | TV series, 5 episodes: "For My Next Trick", "Sergeant Banner", "Maria", "A Cry of Wolf", "Sat'dy Arvo" |
| 1974 | The Box | Vern Walters | TV series |
| 1974/75 | Homicide | Service station proprietor, Kelpie, Bernie Harrison, George Burley, Publican | TV series, 5 episodes: "A Thing of the Past", "Twelve Bar Blues", "Welcome to Mayfield", "The Chaff Bandits", "Free Enterprise" |
| 1974-75 | Matlock Police | Pious Pearce, Art, Dummy Dummett, Frank Gallagher, Bernie Coghlan | TV series, 5 episodes: "Loggerheads", "A Couple of Days Away", "Like Fred", "The Last and Final Straw", "The Right of Way" |
| 1976 | King's Men | Withers | TV series, episode: Public Enemy Number #1 |
| 1976 | Alvin Purple | Perce | TV series, episode: "Like Father, Like Son" |
| 1977 | Young Ramsay | Syd Kelly | TV series, episode: "Yellow Dog" |
| 1980 | Arcade | Walter Blair | TV series, 35 episodes |
| 1980 | The Sullivans | Gabby | TV series |
| 1981 | A Town Like Alice | Art Foster | TV series |
| 1984 | Sweet and Sour | Juggler | TV series |
| 1992 | E Street | Reggie Bucketts | TV series |
| 1996 | Fire | Seth | TV series |
| 1997 | Fallen Angels | Cedric | TV series |

== Discography ==
- Sydney Heylen With Maurie Fields – Sydney Heylen at the Britannia - Talent City TB001 - 1960/1961
- Sydney Heylen - More Sydney Heylen at the Britannia - Talent City TB002 - 1960/1961
