= Mirror, Mirror (TV series) =

1995 television series

- Genre: Teen drama Adventure; Time travel
- Created by: Posie Graeme-Evans
- Starring: Petra Jared; Michala Banas; Nicholas Hooper; Jeffrey Walker; James Ashcroft; Nicholas Hammond
- Countries of origin: Australia; New Zealand
- Original languages: English; Māori
- No. of episodes: 20

Production
- Producer: Dave Gibson
- Running time: 24 minutes
- Production companies: Millennium Pictures; New Zealand on Air

Original release
- Network: Network Ten
- Release: 30 September – 23 December 1995

Related
- Mirror, Mirror II

Mirror, Mirror is a television program co-produced by Australia and New Zealand. Presented as a single complete story given in a serial with 20 episodes, there are cliffhangers between some of the episodes.

Posie Graeme-Evans created the series, as well as being one of the executive producers. The other executive producers were Dorothee Pinfold and Ian Fairweather.

John Banas, one of the directors of the series, is the father of Michala Banas (who plays the role of "Louisa" in the series). The other director was Sophie Turkiewicz.

Co-writers for the series were Ray Harding, Greg Haddrick, Tony Morphett, Greg Millin, Katherine Thomson, Hilary Bell, Anthony Ellis, Ian Fairweather, Posie Graeme-Evans. The theme song, which was co-written by Chris Harriott (music) and Dennis Watkins (lyrics), was sung by Nadine Weinberger.

== Cast ==
=== Major cast members (in credits order) ===
- Petra Jared as Jo (Josephine) Tiegan
- Michala Banas as Louisa Iredale
- Nicholas Hooper as Nicholas
- Peter Bensley as Andrew Tiegan
- Judith McIntosh as Catherine Guthrie Tiegan
- Michele Amas as Primrose Iredale
- Gerald Bryan as Joshua Iredale
- James Ashcroft as Tama Williams
- Jeffrey Walker as Royce Tiegan
- Jason Gascoigne as Titus Iredale
- Nicholas Hammond as Sir Ivor Creevey-Thorne

=== Other cast members ===
- Bernard Kearns as The Old Man
- Miriama Smith as Ani
- Judy Douglass as Mrs. Whitelaw
- Stephen Butterworth as Bellamy Frid
- Liza Jones as Jade Coigley
- Donna Akersten as Leonie Coigley
- David McKenzie as Dennis Coigley
- Eddie Campbell as Campbell
- Nicholas Leggett as Jesse
- Carly Neemia as Mia

== Plot ==
When fourteen-year-old Jo Tiegan is shopping with her father in 1995, she notices an antique shop which she feels a compulsion to go to. There she sees a beautiful oval mirror, which she is given as a gift by the elderly owner of the shop, who comments that the mirror is meant for her. Jo is delighted, and the mirror is placed in her bedroom. That night, Jo is stunned to see the image of another girl in the mirror, instead of her own reflection, and it is obvious that the other girl, Louisa Iredale (also fourteen years old), can see her just as clearly. Louisa is able to 'introduce' herself to Jo by writing her name on a book for Jo to read. When Jo tries to write her name on the mirror to introduce herself to Louisa, she is startled when the pen begins to disappear into the mirror. After Louisa is called away to dinner, Jo investigates the mystery and is accidentally pulled through the mirror into Louisa's bedroom in 1919. This leads to the discovery, by Jo and Louisa, that they can visit each other's times, through the mirror, any time they want to do so – provided that the mirror is situated in exactly the same place and that the mirror's alignment and orientation are identical within the mirror's frame, at corresponding moments in 1919 and 1995.

In 1919, Louisa's father is a senior official in the New Zealand Government's Health Department, and their family house is a mansion with servants. Jo, who is the daughter of the Australian school principal at a New Zealand college, lives in a school residential building which happens to be the same house as Louisa's family home, and the girls even have the same bedroom.

When Jo and Louisa meet, there is instant rapport between the two girls and they become firm friends, and life changes for them both as they become caught up in a web of intrigue. Following Jo's unexpected journey through the mirror, a hazardous situation occurs during an archaeological dig in a well at Jo's school, when a container they discover in the well is damaged and two of the students working nearby are accidentally sprayed with toxic waste. The affected students become extremely ill, and, when it is discovered that the container has the date 1919 on it, Jo is worried that her friends' sickness is her fault because of going through the mirror to 1919.

Back in 1919, Jo asks Louisa to help her find the container so that they can move it, to prevent the later disastrous events happening in 1995. The well is located in the yard of a neighbouring house which is rented by a British visitor to the area, Sir Ivor Creevey-Thorne. Jo and Louisa enter the yard and look down the well, but are disturbed in their actions by Sir Ivor Creevey-Thorne. Their activities are watched by a teenage boy, Nicholas, whom Sir Ivor had brought from Russia to New Zealand, under the guise of caring for the boy until the dangerous situation in Russia abated. Although Nicholas is grateful to Sir Ivor for his help, he is extremely worried about his family, whom he has not heard about for a long time, and is worried about the lack of information he receives whenever he asks Sir Ivor about them. Nicholas is also upset that Sir Ivor refuses to allow him to leave the house, or to have any friends of his own age.

When Nicholas manages to escape from the house, he goes to Louisa's home, where he finds Jo's encyclopedia (which Jo had brought through the mirror to show to Louisa and her brother Titus when they have to write an essay about the Roman Empire). Intrigued by colour photographs, Nicholas checks for information about the Russian Royal Family. To his horror, he reads that Nicholas II, the Tsar of Russia, and his family, had been executed. When Jo and Louisa come into the room, Nicholas asks Jo where she got the book and demands that she tell him if the information is correct. Jo says that the book was given to her by her Dad and that the information is correct. Nicholas reveals to Jo and Louisa that he is Alexei Nikolaevich, the son of the Tsar, and that it is his family who had been executed. Sir Ivor's treachery is finally revealed. Instead of caring for Nicholas, Sir Ivor had actually brought Nicholas to New Zealand so that he could 'sell' Nicholas to the highest bidder – Russian Bolsheviks, who want to take Nicholas back to Russia with them so that Nicholas, the last surviving member of the Russian Royal Family, can be publicly executed.

Jo asks her school friend, Tama, a science student, to assist her and Louisa and Nicholas. When Louisa and Tama meet for the first time, they instantly fall for each other – with the romantic bond between them deepening as time passes. There is also a romantic bond between Jo and Nicholas. Sir Ivor, who had earlier taken Nicholas' family signet ring (saying it was for the ring's 'safekeeping'), calls for Nicholas to be brought to him and then takes the ring from a desk drawer. Sir Ivor drops the ring into a container of toxic waste – in front of the horrified Nicholas – and warns Nicholas not to attempt to retrieve his ring from the container.

Later, Nicholas, who requires his family signet ring as proof of his identity, tells Jo that the container of toxic waste is safe, as he has hidden it in the well. Jo is horrified at this and now considers Nicholas to be the person responsible for the harm which had befallen her friends at the school. Nicholas promises her that everything would be okay. With the help of Tama, and the technology of 1995, a neutralising agent for the toxic waste is discovered, and a sufficient quantity is manufactured to render the waste in the container safe.

Sir Ivor holds a ball, to which members of the New Zealand's high society has been invited (including Louisa's parents). While waiting at the fence for a chance for Nicholas to go to the yard to pour the neutralising agent in the container, music can be heard from Sir Ivor's ballroom and Nicholas teaches Jo to dance the old way. During the dance, Nicholas and Jo kiss each other, and Louisa and Tama shyly hold hands.

Back in 1995, Jo's parents are very worried that Jo is back in 1919, and they decide to confront the elderly owner of the antique shop over the matter. They are surprised when the old man welcomes them and comments that they are expected. The elderly man tells them everything, and his true identity is revealed. He upsets Jo's parents when he states that he and Jo would marry (in 1919) and that Jo would not be returning to 1995. Meanwhile, back in 1919, Nicholas pours the neutralising agent into the container. Although he is successful in neutralising the toxic waste, it will still remain harmful for many years after 1919. Nicholas is able to travel through the mirror to 1995 and retrieve his ring. When he attempts to return to 1919 through the mirror with the ring, he discovers that he is unable to do so because the ring already exists in 1919. Nicholas is given two choices – he can return to 1919 without the ring (and, therefore, without him being able to prove his identity), or he can stay in 1995 with Jo. After he makes his choice the mirror begins to ripple and everyone must get to the time period they wish to remain in before the mirror vanishes from both periods.

== Awards and nominations ==
=== Awards ===
- Best Children's Program award at the 1996 New Zealand Film and TV Awards
- Gold award at the World Television Festival in Houston, United States
- Petra Jared – Best New Talent award at the 1996 Australian Film Institute awards

=== Nominations ===
- Best Children's Program at the 1996 Australian Film Institute awards
- Finalist at Prix Jeunesse International Festival awards in Munich, Germany
- Michala Banas – Best Juvenile Performance at the 1996 New Zealand Film and TV Awards

== Notes ==
=== Books ===
Louisa Iredale has a copy of Lewis Carroll's book Through the Looking-Glass in her bedroom. This is in homage to Lewis Carroll's book, which also involves a girl travelling through a mirror, albeit to another world.

A novelised version of the Mirror, Mirror television story was written by Hilary Bell, one of the many co-writers of the television series, following the release of the series. However, although most of the book remained true to the series, there are some marked differences between the series and the novelised version of the story (e.g., the description of The Old Man's hair and the colour of the horse which was ridden by Nicholas). The book won the 1996 Aurealis Award for best young-adult novel.

=== Filming locations ===
The house, home to the Iredale and Tiegan family, is actually Gear Homestead in Porirua. Sir Ivor's house was a former building named "Brendenwood" at the grounds of Sacred Heart College in Lower Hutt. It was demolished several years ago. The train station in 1919 is Silverstream Railway Museum in Lower Hutt. The train station used in 1995, is the Khandallah railway station in Wellington. The park where Louisa, Titus and Nicholas have a picnic and Jo and her father go for a walk, is the Lady Norwood Rose Garden in Wellington Botanic Garden. Tama's house is filmed at Nairn Street (the flat across number 41), Wellington. The place where antique shop is in the series is located at 1, Riddiford Street in Wellington. The library where Tama goes with Louisa, is the Wellington City Libraries. The cemetery which Louisa and her mother visit, is Bolton Street Cemetery in Wellington, formerly known as Bolton Street Memorial Park.

=== Real world references ===
The series timeline (for the era in which Louisa and Nicholas live in 1919), was dated four years after the bodies of most of the Russian imperial family, the Tsar, Tsarina and three of their daughters, were discovered. This made the character Nicholas' survival and escape at least possible in real world terms. The remains of the Tsarevich and his fourth sister were not uncovered until 2007, twelve years after the series was broadcast.

In the series the school is called "Hampton Shelley College". It was filmed at the Sacred Heart College in Lower Hutt. The logo of Hampton Shelley College looks identical to the Sacred Heart College's logo.

=== Petra's short hair ===
Petra Jared auditioned for the part of "Louisa". She had long hair at the time. Feeling upset because she thought that she had missed out on the part, she had her hair cut short. Cutting her hair led to Petra appearing in the role of "Jo" instead of "Louisa" in the series.

== Sequel ==
A second series of 26 episodes, featuring a completely new story and set of characters, followed in 1997. The series, while separate from the Mirror, Mirror series, was titled Mirror, Mirror II.

The only similarity between the two series is the presence of a time travelling mirror in New Zealand. The rules for the mirror's mystical properties are different; during Mirror, Mirror, the mirror could only be travelled through by children while in Mirror, Mirror II anybody could go through the mirror.

== DVD releases ==
Mirror, Mirror was released in Australia by Gryphon Entertainment on 28 July 2009 as a two-disc set, with 10 episodes on each disc. The series has also been released on DVD in New Zealand.
