= Joan Sydney =

English-born Australian actress (1936–2022)

- Born: Joan Sydney King; 5 September 1936; Kensington, Central London, England
- Died: 28 December 2022 (aged 86); Sydney, New South Wales, Australia
- Education: Oldham Coliseum Theatre
- Occupation: Actress
- Years active: c.1950s-2013
- Known for: A Country Practice; E Street; Neighbours
- Children: 3
- Family: Maggie King (sister)

Joan Sydney King (5 September 1936 – 28 December 2022) was an English-born Australian actress, primarily known for her television roles in soap operas and serials and in theatre productions.

Sydney started her career in local theatre before appearing on television where her best-known roles were in the soap operas A Country Practice as Maggie Sloane, E Street as publican Mary Patchett and Neighbours as Valda Sheergold.

== Biography ==
=== Early life ===
Joan Sydney King was born in Kensington, Central London, England, on 5 September 1936, to Sam and Rose who met while working at hotels. The family relocated to Wales during the Second World War, first to Rhyl and then to Rhuddlan. She was educated at Abergele Grammar School, before receiving her drama training with the Oldham Repertory Theatre in Manchester .

After appearing on stage in her native England, Sydney featured in radio at the BBC and made her screen debut in the 1957 film version of English play When We Are Married. She emigrated to Australia in 1965 with her family as ten pound poms, first settling in Perth and later Sydney in 1974.

=== TV roles ===
Sydney in TV series A Country Practice

Sydney was known for playing Margaret "Maggie" Sloan, the no-nonsense but compassionate matron of the fictional Wandin Valley Bush Nursing Hospital in the Seven Network rural series A Country Practice from 1983 to 1990 and over 400 episodes. She won the Silver Logie Award for Most Outstanding Actress for her performance in 1989. She also starred alongside her sister Maggie King in a movie-length pilot for a subsequently unmade series in 1987 called Sisterly Love.

Sydney was the second actress to play the matron of the fictional Wandin Valley Hospital after original actress Helen Scott. Her successor, Anne Brennen (played by Mary Regan), used the more modern title "Director of Nursing". After Brennen left, the title was changed back to Matron during the tenure of Rosemary Prior (Maureen Edwards).

In 1993, after 12 seasons on air, A Country Practice was abruptly cancelled, but rival network Ten picked it up soon afterwards. Production was relocated from Pitt Town, New South Wales, to Emerald, Victoria, and, after having spent time in England, Sydney reprised her role as matron, one of five actors including Joyce Jacobs and Andrew Blackman to return to the new ACP series.

In 2002, she joined the long-running serial Neighbours as Valda Sheergold, initially on a semi-regular recurring basis before becoming a permanent member of the cast for the 2007–2008 season.

In 1990, Sydney briefly joined the new soap opera E Street in the role of publican Mary Patchett. She also had guest roles in many other programs including the sitcom Mother and Son and the dramas All Saints, Something in the Air and Miss Fisher's Murder Mysteries.

In 2013, she featured in the television film Cliffy, based on the life of Australian athlete Cliff Young.

== Personal life and death ==
Sydney married her husband, Gerald, in 1960. They had two children. The couple later separated. She had another son from an earlier relationship, Tony Braxton-Smith, who became CEO of the interstate rail company Journey Beyond, a division of Experience Australia Pty. Ltd. (known then under business name "Great Southern Rail"). She was the elder sister of actress Maggie King.

Sydney died aged 86, at her home in Sydney, Australia ( (Note: Some sources state Healesville, Victoria, where her sister Maggie had resided)) on 28 December 2022 after a long illness with Alzheimer's disease, having been diagnosed with breast cancer in 2015.

== Filmography ==
=== Film ===
| Year | Title | Role | Type |
|---|---|---|---|
| 1986 | Departure | | Feature film |
| 2005 | Martie's Party | Joan | Short film |
| 2008 | Your Turn | Joan | Short film |

=== Television ===
| Year | Title | Role | Type |
|---|---|---|---|
| 1957 | When We Are Married | Ruby Birtle | TV film, UK |
| 1978 | The Scalp Merchant | Annie Brice | TV film |
| 1981 | Falcon Island | Guest role: Mrs. Yates | TV series, 1 episode |
| 1983–1993; 1994 | A Country Practice | Regular role: Matron Margaret 'Maggie' Sloan | TV series, 457 episodes |
| 1985 | Flight into Hell | | TV miniseries, 2 episodes |
| 1985 | One Summer Again | | TV miniseries |
| 1986 | Hector's Bunyip | Maude Tremball | TV film |
| 1987 | Have a Go | Judge | TV series, 5 episodes |
| 1988 | Sisterly Love | Jean | TV film |
| 1989 | 1989 TV Week Logie Awards | Herself | TV special |
| 1989 | The Bert Newton Show | Guest with Syd Heylen from 'A Country Practice' | TV series, 1 episode |
| 1989 | Who's True Blue? | Herself | Short film |
| 1990 | In Melbourne Today | Guest | TV series, 1 episode |
| 1991 | Celebrity Wheel Of Fortune | Contestant | TV series, 1 episode |
| 1991–1992 | E Street | Regular role: Mary Patchett | TV series, 54 episodes |
| 1992 | The Morning Show | Guest | TV series, 1 episode |
| 1992 | Mother and Son | Guest role: Merle MacDonald | TV series, 1 episode |
| 1992 | Tracks of Glory | Mrs. Walker | TV miniseries, 2 episodes |
| 1994 | A Country Practice | Regular role: Sister Maggie 'Sloan' Morrison | TV series, 30 episodes |
| 1994; 1996 | Good Morning Australia | Guest | TV series, 1 episode |
| 1995 | Ernie and Denise | Guest | TV series, 1 episode |
| 1996; 1998 | Good Morning Australia | Guest | TV series, 1 episode |
| 1996 | Monday to Friday | Guest | TV series, 1 episode |
| 1998 | Good Morning Australia | Guest (with sister Maggie King) | TV series, 1 episode |
| 2000 | The Morning Shift | Guest | TV series, 1 episode |
| 2000 | Something in the Air | Recurring role: Ruth Dooley | TV series, 3 episodes |
| 2001 | All Saints | Guest role: Mrs. Price | TV series, 2 episodes |
| 2002–2008 | Neighbours | Regular role: Valda Sheergold | TV series, 117 episodes |
| 2006 | TV Turns 50: The Events That Stopped A Nation | Guest (with A Country Practice cast: Lorrae Desmond, Brian Wenzel, Shane Porteous, Anne Tenney, Joyce Jacobs, Josephine Mitchell & Emily Nichol) | TV Special |
| 2007 | Where Are They Now? | Guest (with A Country Practice cast) | TV series, 1 episode |
| 2009 | Thank God You're Here | Contestant | TV series, 1 episode |
| 2012 | Lowdown | Guest role: Concierge | TV series, 1 episode |
| 2012 | Conspiracy 365 | Guest role: Mrs. Fitzgerald | TV series, 1 episode |
| 2013 | Cliffy | Mum | TV film |
| 2013 | Miss Fisher's Murder Mysteries | Guest role: Mother Aloysius | TV series, 1 episode |

== Theatre ==
| Production | Year | Notes |
|---|---|---|
| A Lilly in Little India | 1968 | |
| Old Time Music Hole | 1968 | |
| Paying the Piper | 1972 | |
| Small Craft Warnings | 1972 | |
| The Threepenny Opera | 1973 | |
| Butley | 1973 | |
| Note on a Love Affair | 1973 | |
| Village Wooing | 1973 | |
| The Typists | 1973 | |
| After Magritte | 1973 | |
| Old King Cole | 1973 | |
| Antony and Cleopatra | 1974 | |
| Equus | 1975 | |
| Time and Time Again | 1975 | |
| A Hard Time | 1975 | |
| The School for Scandal | 1975 | |
| Hello Dolly! | 1975 | |
| Kennedy's Children | 1975 | |
| The Slaughter of St Teresa's Day | 1976 | |
| Savages | 1976 | |
| The Magistrate | 1976 | |
| Everyone's a General | 1976 | |
| Who's Afraid of Virginia Woolf? | 1976 | |
| Mixed Doubles | 1976 | |
| The Edward of Edward the Second | 1977 | |
| Going Bananas | 1977 | |
| Cole | 1977 | |
| Chinchilla | 1978 | |
| The Seagull | 1978 | |
| Waiting for Godot | 1978 | |
| A Happy and Holly Occasion | 1978 | |
| The Hostage | 1978 | |
| No, No Nanette | 1978 | |
| A Plum Job | 1979 | |
| The Painting | 1979 | |
| Bossom | 1979 | |
| The Night of the Badger | 1979 | |
| No W.A.Y | 1979 | |
| The Way of the World | 1979 | |
| Something's Aloof | 1979 | |
| The Three Sisters | 1979 | |
| Garden Party | 1980 | |
| Roses in Due Season | 1980 | |
| Joseph Conrad Goes Ashore | 1980 | |
| Piaf | 1980 | |
| Backyard | 1980 | |
| Oliver! | 1980 | |
| Tomfoolery | 1981 | |
| The Importance of Being Ernest | 1981 | |
| Cowardy Custard | 1981 | |
| Cat on a Hot Tin Roof | 1981 | |
| Court Napping | 1981 | |
| The Fields of Heaven | 1982 | |
| Steaming | 1983 | |
| Hedda Gebbler | 1983 | |
| Song from Sideshow Alley | 1985 | |
| Nunsense | | |
| Mrs. Klein | 1990 | |
| Prin | 1992 | |
| I Hate Hamlet | 1992 | |
| Barmaids | 1993 | |
| My Fair Lady | 1996 | |
| Secret Bridemaids Business | 1999 | |
| Trelawny of the Wells | 2000 | |
| Are You Being Served? | 2001 | |
| Talking Heads (national tour) | 2002 | |
| Deckchairs | 2005 | |
| Dirty Dusters | 2010 (reprise) | |
| Be Watching by Gary Files – preliminary readings 1. | 2011 | |

== Awards and nominations ==
| Year | Association | Category | Work | Result | Ref |
|---|---|---|---|---|---|
| 1988 | AFI Awards | Best Performance by an Actress in a Telefeature | Sisterly Love | Nominated | |
| 1989 | Logie Awards | Most Outstanding Actress | A Country Practice | Won | |
| 2014 | Equity Ensemble Awards | Outstanding Performance by an Ensemble in a Mini-series or Telemovie | Cliffy | Nominated | |
