= Gordon Piper =

Australian actor

- Piper in TV series A Country Practice c.1981
- Born: Gordon Stephen Piper; 3 June 1932; Cheltenham, New South Wales, Australia
- Died: 18 September 2004 (aged 72); Sydney, New South Wales, Australia
- Occupations: Actor; director; scriptwriter; comedian
- Television: Robert "Bob" Hatfield on A Country Practice
- Spouse: Judith Ann Price (d. 1981)
- Children: 2
- Website: Gordon Piper official website

Gordon Stephen Piper (3 June 1932 – 18 September 2004) was an Australian actor, theatre director, scriptwriter and comedian active in all facets of the industry including radio, stage, television (including soap opera and TV movies) and film. He remains best known as plumber Bob Hatfield in A Country Practice.

== Early life ==
Piper was born on 3 June 1932, son of Mildred Nelly (née Johnson) and Clive Reginald Piper on their dairy farm in the Sydney suburb of Cheltenham. He began performing as a child, singing soprano for the Sydney Boys' Choir and making his radio debut with a choir on 2FC.

== Acting career ==
Piper began his professional career acting in radio plays, and later branched out to touring variety acts which toured local pubs and clubs. He worked as a television extra for several years, before taking to the stage for a theatre career. Notable roles in the 1970s included a long-running stint in the play Dimboola, and a role as a bartender in the film My Brilliant Career. He was also involved in Werrington's own Henry Lawson Theatre performing both on stage and as director.

Piper is best known for his long-term role as town plumber Robert Menzies 'Bob' Hatfield in the television soap A Country Practice, appearing from episode 4 of that series in 1981 until 1992, becoming one of the longest-serving actors in an Australian drama series, until he was written out of the series alongside co-star Syd Heylen, as the producers wanted to concentrate on a younger cast and an updated formula. The decision was later regretted and co-star Brian Wenzel agreed in an interview in TV Week that the two actors were a large part of the series' comedic storylines.

Other television roles included Homicide, Boney, Spyforce, and the made-for-TV film Hector's Bunyip. He appeared in the film The Dark Room.

Piper served as the associate director of the Arts Council of New South Wales. He was also a founding member of P.A.C.T. (Producers, Actors, Composers and Talents), one of the best-known actors' studios in Sydney. He and actor Leonard Teale produced 'fill-ins' for ABC-TV prior to the widespread broadcasting of music videos.

== Personal life, illness and death ==
Piper's wife Judith Ann Piper (formerly Price) died in 1981 and he wrote and directed an episode of A Country Practice in dedication to her and her story.

Piper had diabetes, which affected his circulation and eventually resulted in the amputation of both his legs. He suffered a cardiac arrest and was taken to Blacktown Hospital and died on 19 September 2004 aged 72.

== Filmography ==
=== Film ===
Year	Title	Role	Type
1971	Wake in Fright	Two-up Player (uncredited)	Feature film
1972	Private Collection	First Removalist	Feature film
1978	Puzzle	Policeman in House	TV movie
1979	My Brilliant Career	Barman	Feature film
1982	The Dark Room	Police Sargeant	Feature film
1986	Hector's Bunyip	Jack Benson	TV movie

=== Television ===
Year	Title	Role	Type
1971	Division 4	John Hardin	TV series
1971	Dynasty (aka Tony Morphett's Dynasty)	Warder	TV series
197-	The Comedy Game	Pub Customer	TV series
1972	Boney	Sergeant	TV series
1971–73	Spyforce	Prison Sergeant (uncredited) / Eric the Grave Digger (uncredited)	TV series
1976	Number 96	Detective Sergeant	TV series, 2 episodes
1978	Case for the Defence	Moncheiff	TV series
1977–79	Chopper Squad	Port Officer / The Detective	TV series
1981–92	A Country Practice	Robert Menzies 'Bob' Hatfield	TV series, 745 episodes
