= James Gear =

New Zealand butcher, farmer, and businessman

- Born: c. 1839
- Died: 5 April 1911

James Gear (c. 1839 – 5 April 1911) was a New Zealand butcher, farmer and businessman.

== Biography ==
He was born in Ilchester, Somerset, England in about 1839. Gear founded the Gear Meat Preserving and Freezing Company at Petone in 1882 and was its managing director until 1885. In 1891 he was made patron of the Wellington United Butchers' Association in appreciation of his work and efforts to help others in the trade.

Gear built a house for his family at Porirua which he called 'Okowai' but which is now known as the Gear Homestead and managed by Heritage New Zealand. Gear's health declined as he got older, possibly as a result of a back injury sustained as a young man. He needed a wheelchair and couldn't cope with his noisy family, so he had built an annex next to his home which was connected to the main house by a ramp. Gear lived there attended by a nurse and servant.

Gear died at home in 1911 and was buried at Porirua Cemetery.
