= Maggie King =

Australian actress (1940–2020)

- Maggie King (pictured right) with sister actress Joan Sydney
- Born: Margaret Anne King; 10 April 1939; Wales, United Kingdom
- Died: 5 March 2020 (aged 80); Healesville, Victoria, Australia
- Occupation: Actress
- Years active: ?-2010
- Family: Joan Sydney (sister)

Margaret Anne King (10 April 1939 – 5 March 2020) was a Welsh born Australian actress, active in stage, television and film roles. She is probably best known for her AFI-nominated role in The Big Steal.

King was born in Wales, United Kingdom, and was the younger sister of English-Australian actress Joan Sydney. whom she often acted alongside, primarily on stage. She retired in 2010.

== Filmography ==
=== Film ===
Year	Title	Role	Notes
1985	Fran	Person in Pub Trio	
1990	The Big Steal	Edith Clark	
1993	This Won't Hurt a Bit	Mrs. Prescott	
1998	Crackers	Violet 'Vi' Hall	

=== Television ===
Year	Title	Role	Notes
1986	Sons and Daughters	Bella Brixton	3 episodes
1988	Sisterly Love	Sylvia	Unsold TV pilot
1988	Dadah Is Death	Woman at Airport	TV film
1990	Skirts	Guest role: Bridie	TV series, 1 episode 6: "Parents Ain't What They Used To Be"
1994	The Damnation of Harvey McHugh	Martha	"Little House on the Gold Coast"
1994	Law of the Land	Mrs. Cowan	Recurring role
1994	Newlyweds	Cassandra	"Afternoon Tea"
1994	The Man from Snowy River	Mrs. Fowler	Recurring role
1994	Blue Heelers	Dr. Noonan	"Doing It Tough"
1996	Neighbours	Esmeralda Villio	3 episodes
1997	Blue Heelers	Mary Chalmers	"Safe as Houses"
1997	Good Guys Bad Guys: Only the Young Die Good	Bookie's Wife	TV film
2001–03	The Saddle Club	Dr. Judy Baker	Recurring role
2002	MDA	Prun Jansen	"Break It Gently"
