= Gear Meat Company =

Former processing company in New Zealand

- Industry: Meat processing
- Founded: 1882 in Petone, New Zealand
- Founder: James Gear
- Defunct: 1981

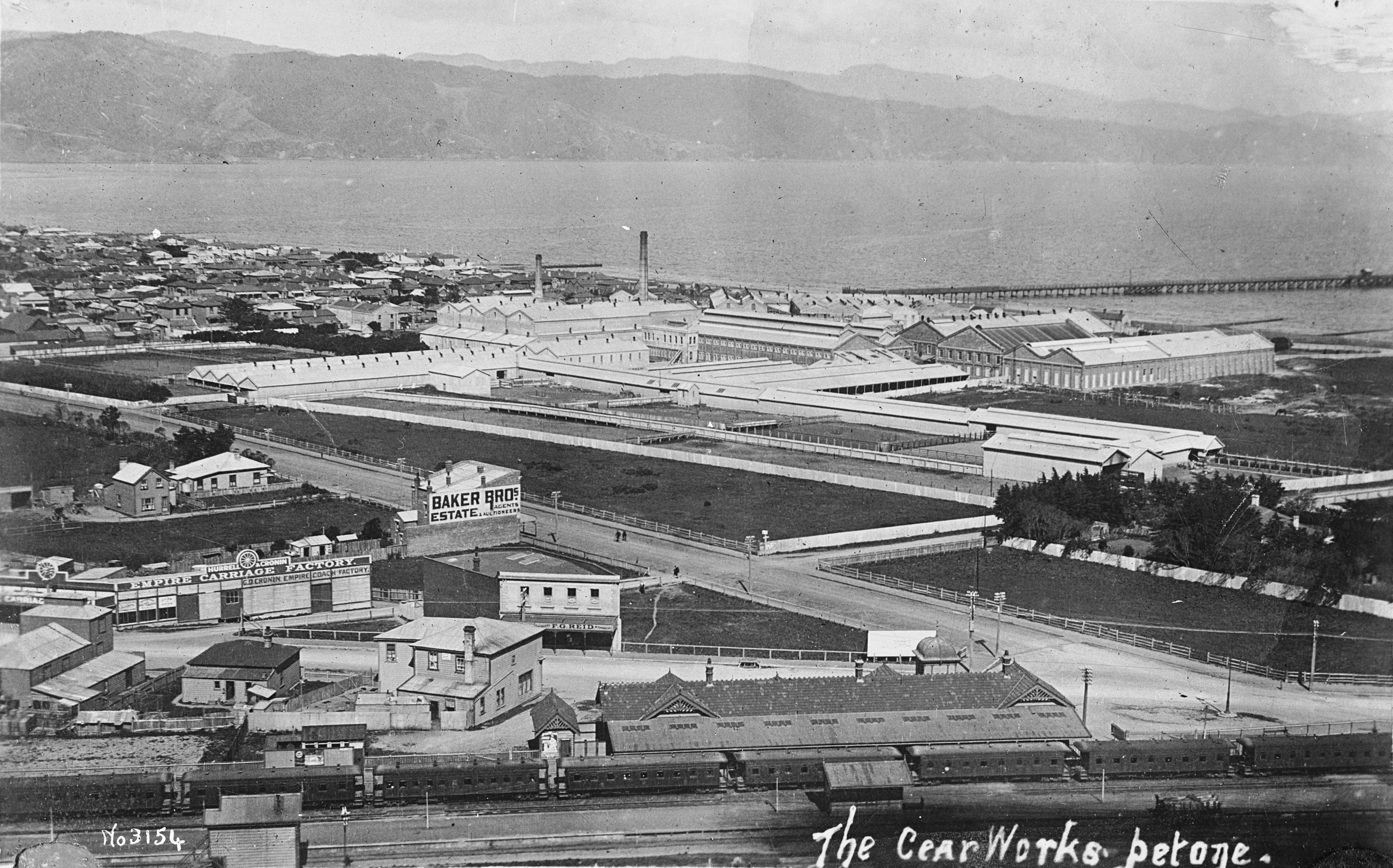
Gear Meat Company works at Petone

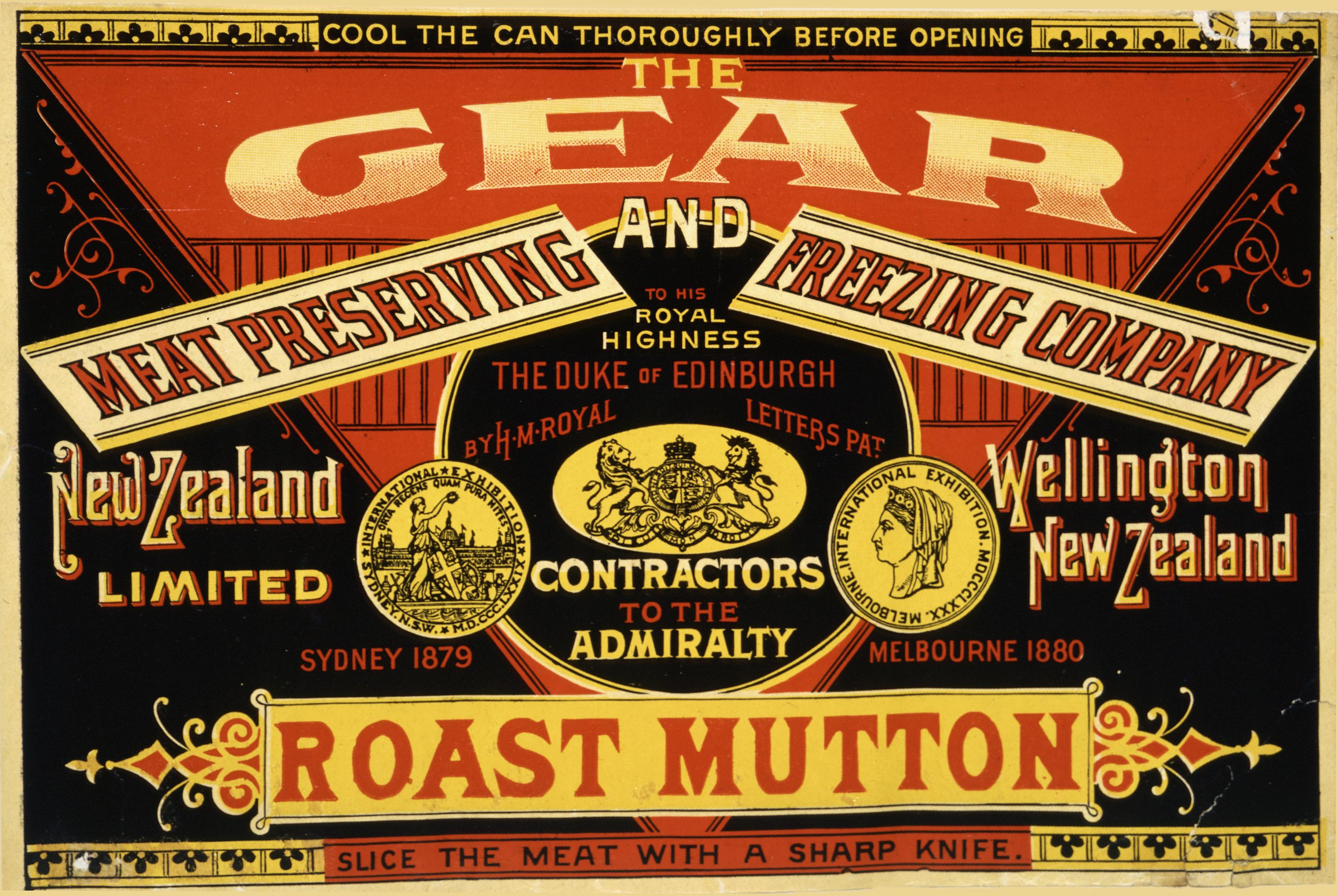
Label for canned meat

Gear Meat Company was a meat processing company with a large works that operated in Petone, New Zealand from 1874 until 1981 and was one of the major employers in Petone.

== Foundation and early years ==
The company was founded by James Gear, a butcher born in England who had emigrated to Australia in 1857 and then to New Zealand around 1861. From about 1865 Gear operated butcher's shops in Wellington, and in 1873 he started a meat preserving plant in the city. In 1874 he built a slaughterhouse and processing plant on 30 acres of land near the waterfront in Petone. The land included the Te Puni urupa (Māori cemetery) and some sections set aside as Native Reserve. An 1897 map of the works shows the urupa encircled by a rail track and surrounded on three sides by meat works buildings.The meat works is believed to be the first industry in the Hutt Valley, with its importance reflected in its inclusion on Petone Borough's first coat of arms in 1884.

By the end of 1881 the plant at Petone employed over 100 men who boarded on the premises. At that time the plant was slaughtering 3400 bullocks and 80,000 sheep each year, and exporting around 1000 tons of tallow and 7000 tons of preserved meat. Pigs and sheep were kept nearby at a leasehold section of 100 acres near the mouth of the Hutt River that was used as a grazing area and stockyard, and which quickly became known as Gear Island and was later bought by the company.

In February 1882 an entrepreneur sent the first successful shipment of frozen meat from New Zealand, from Port Chalmers to Great Britain on the ship Dunedin, marking the opening up of new markets and opportunities for meat processing companies. Gear established the Gear Meat Preserving and Freezing Company of New Zealand in November 1882 in order to use his butchering and meat preserving businesses as the basis for the new trade in frozen meat, and to distance himself from the day-to-day business for health reasons. Gear retired as managing director in 1885. The new company consisted of various properties in Wellington operating as butchers, meat preserving factories, stables and dwellings, the 16-acre plant at Petone, the lease on Gear Island, and two acres at Featherston used as stockyards. The company also owned a branch railway line running to the works at Petone.

In 1880 the company built a private rail siding which ran from near the Korokoro stream, along the beach to the works. Another line across the Esplanade was built around 1885, and a network of lines was created inside the works. Animals could be brought directly from the Wairarapa, and manure could be sent out by rail.

In 1883–1884 the company built a wharf at Petone under a fourteen-year license from the Wellington Harbour Board. The company bought an old ship, the Jubilee, at Sydney to use as a freezing plant. The Jubilee arrived in Wellington in October 1883 and was then fitted out with freezing equipment. Meat was processed at the Petone works then transferred by rail to the Jubilee moored at the wharf for freezing. When the ship was full it was towed across the harbour to Wellington and the meat transferred to other ships for transport to markets. Coal was brought to the wharf for the company. After Gear Meat's lease expired, the wharf was leased to the Petone Borough Council but still used by the company for shipping meat, coal, tallow and skins. In 1891 a freezing plant was built at the Petone works to replace the Jubilee, and a few years later the company decided to dispose of the ship since it had become possible to transport frozen meat to Wellington quickly and cheaply by rail. In 1902 the Jubilee was sold to the Westport Coal Company for use as a storage facility. The wharf deteriorated and was removed in 1902, and contractors for the Harbour Board built a new wharf slightly further east along the shore during 1908-1909.

Additions to the plant were constructed in 1885 and 1900, and by 1906 the works had 80 butchers who could process 8000 sheep per day. The works had capacity to store 180,000 sheep carcases, and the fellmongery could process 6000 pelts a day. Meat was canned in another department at the works. In 1890 a manure works was constructed at the southern end of Gear Island, so that offal and blood could be turned into manure for sale.

== 20th century ==
By 1905 the manure works was moved from Gear Island to the main plant on the Esplanade because the Gear Island site had problems with flooding, transport issues and odour problems affecting nearby housing areas. Between 1908 and 1917 the company sold parts of the Gear Island land. During World War 1 the company provided meat and other products such as wool and hides to the British government and made donations to patriotic funds and hospitals. During the Depression in the 1930s the company had its first year where it made a loss rather than a profit, facing competition from other meat processing companies and worker strikes. At the end of 1932 the company switched from the 'solo' butchering system, where one man killed and prepared each sheep or lamb, to the 'chain' system where each man did one task as the carcass moved along a conveyor belt. The chain system for beef was introduced in the 1960s.

During World War 2 the company provided meat to the British and United States governments, and in 1940 it changed its name to the Gear Meat Company Limited. The purchase agreement with the British government ended after the 1953-54 killing season, and after this the company needed to find alternative markets. In 1959 the company began selling ewes to the Greek army and to Turkey. A deal with Israel saw the Israeli government send kosher slaughtermen to New Zealand to process beef for that country.

Improvements were made to the plant in the late 1950s and 1960s, and the company was reorganised. Average profits more than doubled from 1960 to 1964. A record number of over one million sheep and lambs were killed during the 1967–68 season. During this period the company also increased its number of retail butcher shops.

The early 1970s were a profitable time for the reorganised and modernised company, but in 1974 it reported a large financial loss. A large fire in February 1970 had destroyed a newly built storage facility along with a large amount of meat ready for export, and in 1973 the United Kingdom joined the European Economic Community which affected Gear's exports to Great Britain. During 1974 there were stoppages and 'go-slows' by workers at the plant. Taito Phillip Field was elected as Secretary of the Gear Meat branch of the powerful Freezing Workers' Union, and during the next few years workers held meetings to discuss responses to the company's policies which would reduce wages and conditions. After a lockout in November 1979 workers agreed to a 3% wage reduction.

In 1977 Thomas Borthwick & Sons Ltd notified a takeover bid for Gear Meat. Brierley Investments then announced it wanted to become a major shareholder in Gear and the company chose to enter an agreement with Brierley Investments and the Hawkes Bay Farmers Meat Company Ltd, for 40% of Gear Meat's shares. Shareholders were angry the following year when the company made a loss, and further losses occurred in 1978 and 1980. This led to a takeover offer by the Hawkes Bay Farmers Meat Company which the Board of Gear Meat accepted on 19 June 1980. Gear would dispose of its land and plant at Petone, but retain its 40 retail shops. This would lead to the loss of jobs for about 1000 workers and affect household incomes and associated businesses in Petone. Workers objected to the company's proposal to shed staff and cut wages by 20% and the company chose to close the works.

The closure of the Petone plant was confirmed on 20 November 1981. On 28 January 1982 Gear Meat shareholders voted to change the company's name to Huttons NZ Ltd. Gear Meat Company and Brierley Investments had previously bought Huttons' assets. Demolition of the Petone site took place between September 1982 and March 1984. The site is now partly occupied by the TAB New Zealand building.

== VIP visitors ==
In January 1886 Seu Manu and William Upolu, two Samoan chiefs who had come to New Zealand to discuss annexation of Samoa, visited the works and went on to the Jubilee. They didn't go into the freezing chamber, but were shown some 'snow' which was new to them.

In June 1901 the Duke and Duchess of Cornwall and York (the future George V and Queen Mary) visited the works at Petone, and in 1956 the Duke of Edinburgh (Prince Philip) was shown around.
