= List of Christchurch railway stations =

Christchurch railway station at Addington, used by the TranzAlpine and Coastal Pacific

This is a list of railway stations in the Christchurch region of New Zealand's South Island. It includes both open and closed stations.

New Zealand's first public railway, built by the Canterbury Provincial Railways, opened on 1 December 1863 between Christchurch and the wharf at Ferrymead, and was extended through the Lyttelton rail tunnel to the port at Lyttelton on 9 December 1867. Over the next two decades, three main lines were built from Christchurch: the Main South Line, running south-west across the Canterbury Plains to Rolleston in 1866 and Burnham in 1868; the Main North Line, running north through Kaiapoi to Rangiora in 1872; and the Midland Line, leaving the Main South Line at Rolleston and reaching Sheffield in 1874 and Springfield in 1879. These were joined by branch lines serving the farming districts of the plains: the Southbridge and Little River branches to the south, the Whitecliffs Branch to the west, and the Oxford and Eyreton branches to the north. The network took a radial form centred on Christchurch.

Christchurch's suburban passenger services ran to Lyttelton and Rangiora, with the Lyttelton line electrified from 1929 to 1970. Local and medium-distance trains also ran to Burnham, Little River, Southbridge and Springfield, and to Ashburton and Waipara beyond the area covered by this list. Passenger services to Little River and Southbridge ended on 12 April 1951, to Burnham on 22 December 1967 and to Springfield in December 1968. Lyttelton suburban services ended in 1972, and the last services to Rangiora ran in 1976.

A 12-month commuter rail trial, run by Mainland Rail between Rangiora, Rolleston and central Christchurch, is planned to start in mid-2027.

== Ownership and operation ==
The railway lines and station platforms are owned by KiwiRail. The only regular passenger trains are KiwiRail's long-distance services from Christchurch: the TranzAlpine to Greymouth, which also stops at Rolleston, Darfield and Springfield, and the Coastal Pacific to Picton, which also stops at Rangiora.

== Network ==
=== Lyttelton line ===
Name	Served by	Opened	Closed	Notes
Christchurch (Moorhouse Avenue) (Note: Christchurch has had several station sites. The first station opened on Moorhouse Avenue on 1 December 1863, and was replaced by a second station nearby on 21 December 1877. This was rebuilt on the same site, with the new station officially opened on 1 November 1960. The Moorhouse Avenue station was sold in 1991 and replaced by a new station on the former Addington Workshops site, which opened on 5 April 1993. Since 2026, Mainland Rail event trains have used a temporary platform at Pilgrim Place, near the Moorhouse Avenue site.)	—N/a	1 December 1863	5 April 1993	Second station opened 21 December 1877 and rebuilt 1 November 1960.
Linwood	—N/a	16 December 1880	22 July 1973	
Opawa	—N/a	30 April 1864	30 April 1972	
Woolston	—N/a	June 1883	February 1972	Originally named Hillsborough.
Heathcote	—N/a	1 December 1863	11 August 1985	Originally named The Valley. Remained open for private siding traffic only until October/November 1986.
Lyttelton	—N/a	9 December 1867	28 February 1972	Second station opened August 1873; third station opened 14 October 1963.
Lyttelton Wharf	—N/a	1902	September 1976	Boat train platform for the Wellington ferry.

=== North line ===
Name	Served by	Opened	Closed	Notes
Christchurch (Moorhouse Avenue)	—N/a	1 December 1863	5 April 1993	Second station opened 21 December 1877 and rebuilt 1 November 1960. Mainland Rail event trains have used a temporary platform at Pilgrim Place, near the former station site, since 2026; a permanent platform there has been proposed for the commuter rail trial.
Addington	—N/a	13 October 1866	13 October 1986 (freight)	Also known as Addington Junction.
Riccarton	—N/a	29 April 1872	2 July 1977	
Bryndwr	—N/a	4 January 1906	27 March 1977	Also known as Strowan.
Papanui	—N/a	29 April 1872	16 June 1991	Remained open for private siding traffic but now closed completely.
Styx	—N/a	29 April 1872	31 March 1984	
Belfast	—N/a	29 April 1872	13 October 1986 (freight)	
Chaneys	—N/a	1877	19 September 1971	
Stewart's Gully	—N/a	c. 1883	c. 1957	Replaced by Kainga when the line between Chaneys and Kaiapoi was realigned for a new bridge.
Kainga	—N/a	c. 1957	27 March 1977	Replaced Stewart's Gully.
Kaiapoi	—N/a	29 April 1872	13 October 1986 (freight)	
Flaxton	—N/a	3 September 1872	17 July 1966	
Southbrook	—N/a	3 September 1972	5 July 1981	
Rangiora	Coastal Pacific	5 November 1872	–	Northern terminus of Christchurch suburban passenger services until 30 April 1976.

=== South line ===
Name	Served by	Opened	Closed	Notes
Christchurch (Moorhouse Avenue)	—N/a	1 December 1863	5 April 1993	Second station opened 21 December 1877 and rebuilt 1 November 1960. Mainland Rail event trains have used a temporary platform at Pilgrim Place, near the former station site, since 2026; a permanent platform there has been proposed for the commuter rail trial.
Addington	—N/a	13 October 1866	13 October 1986 (freight)	Also known as Addington Junction.
Middleton	—N/a	13 October 1866	14 December 1970	
Sockburn	—N/a	13 October 1866	March 1987	
Hornby	—N/a	13 October 1866		Also known as Hornby Junction and Southbridge Junction.
Islington	—N/a	c. April 1880	18 June 1972	Originally named Factory. Terminus of suburban services from Christchurch until 5 December 1949. Remained open for private siding traffic only.
Parish's	—N/a	13 October 1866	16 December 1878	A halt located at Pound Road.
Templeton	—N/a	13 October 1866	25 July 1971	
Weedons	—N/a	13 October 1866	1 February 1964	
Rolleston	TranzAlpine, Mainlander	16 October 1866	–	Original station destroyed by fire and replaced.
Burnham	—N/a	February 1868	Before 1993	Originally named Leeston Road. Terminus of suburban services from Christchurch from 5 December 1949 until 22 December 1967. Closed to goods on 29 March 1981, except private siding traffic.

=== Springfield line ===
Name	Served by	Opened	Closed	Notes
Christchurch (Moorhouse Avenue)	—N/a	1 December 1863	5 April 1993	Second station opened 21 December 1877 and rebuilt 1 November 1960.
Addington	—N/a	13 October 1866	13 October 1986 (freight)	Also known as Addington Junction.
Sockburn	—N/a	13 October 1866	March 1987	
Hornby	—N/a	13 October 1866		Also known as Hornby Junction and Southbridge Junction.
Islington	—N/a	c. April 1880	18 June 1972	Originally named Factory. Remained open for private siding traffic only.
Templeton	—N/a	13 October 1866	25 July 1971	
Weedons	—N/a	13 October 1866	1 February 1964	
Rolleston	TranzAlpine	16 October 1866	–	Original station destroyed by fire and replaced.
Sandy Knolls	—N/a	October 1899	1 March 1970	
Aylesbury	—N/a	1 December 1874	18 February 1979	Originally named Bealey's Road.
Kirwee	—N/a	1 December 1874	1 March 1970	
Darfield	TranzAlpine	1 December 1874	–	Also known as Darfield Junction.
Racecourse Hill	—N/a	1 December 1874	18 November 1973	
Waddington	—N/a	1 December 1874	29 July 1962	
Sheffield	—N/a	1 December 1874	3 November 1986	Originally named Malvern.
Annat	—N/a	24 December 1879	10 December 1984	
Springfield	TranzAlpine	24 December 1879	–	Terminus of mixed train services from Christchurch, which were cancelled from 16 December 1968.

=== Whitecliffs Branch ===
Name	Served by	Opened	Closed	Notes
Darfield	TranzAlpine	1 December 1874	–	Also known as Darfield Junction.
Hawkins	—N/a	3 November 1875	31 March 1962	
Homebush	—N/a	3 November 1875	31 March 1962	
Coalgate	—N/a	3 November 1875	31 March 1962	Originally named Bluff.
Glentunnel	—N/a	22 April 1876	31 March 1962	Originally named Surveyors Gully.
South Malvern	—N/a	3 November 1875	21 November 1960	
Whitecliffs	—N/a	3 November 1875	31 March 1962	Also spelt White Cliffs.

=== Southbridge line ===
Name	Served by	Opened	Closed	Notes
Christchurch (Moorhouse Avenue)	—N/a	1 December 1863	5 April 1993	Second station opened 21 December 1877 and rebuilt 1 November 1960.
Addington	—N/a	13 October 1866	13 October 1986 (freight)	Also known as Addington Junction.
Middleton	—N/a	13 October 1866	14 December 1970	
Sockburn	—N/a	13 October 1866	March 1987	
Hornby	—N/a	13 October 1866		Also known as Hornby Junction and Southbridge Junction.
Prebbleton	—N/a	26 April 1875	1 July 1967	
Ladbrooks	—N/a	26 April 1875	30 June 1962	Also known as Ladbrooke's
Lincoln	—N/a	26 April 1875	1 July 1967	Also known as Lincoln Junction.
Springston	—N/a	26 April 1875	30 June 1962	
Goulds Road	—N/a	16 April 1909	25 July 1960	
Ellesmere	—N/a	26 April 1875	30 June 1962	
Lake Road	—N/a	April 1886	30 June 1962	
Irwell	—N/a	13 July 1875	30 June 1962	
Doyleston	—N/a	13 July 1875	30 June 1962	
Leeston	—N/a	13 July 1875	30 June 1962	
Hills Road	—N/a	13 July 1875	30 June 1962	
Southbridge	—N/a	13 July 1875	30 June 1962	

=== Little River Branch ===
Name	Served by	Opened	Closed	Notes
Lincoln	—N/a	26 April 1875	1 July 1967	Also known as Lincoln Junction.
Greenpark	—N/a	16 May 1882	30 June 1962	
Matthews Road	—N/a	c. September 1946	30 June 1962	
Motukarara	—N/a	16 May 1882	30 June 1962	Originally named Rabbit Island. This station has been preserved near its original site.
Kaituna	—N/a	16 May 1882	30 June 1962	
Birdlings Flat	—N/a	16 May 1882	30 June 1962	
Little River	—N/a	16 March 1886	30 June 1962	This station has been preserved on site.

=== Oxford Branch ===
Name	Served by	Opened	Closed	Notes
Rangiora	Coastal Pacific	5 November 1872	–	
Bells	—N/a	21 September 1887	19 April 1959	
Fernside	—N/a	1 December 1874	19 April 1959	
Stoke	—N/a	May 1879	3 July 1949	
Springbank	—N/a	1 December 1874	19 April 1959	Originally named Moeraki.
Cust	—N/a	1 December 1874	19 April 1959	
Bennetts Junction	—N/a	1 February 1878	19 April 1959	
Carleton	—N/a	21 June 1875	19 April 1959	
Oxford East	—N/a	21 June 1875	19 April 1959	
Oxford West	—N/a	21 June 1875	19 April 1959	
View Hill	—N/a	7 August 1884	14 July 1930	
Bexley	—N/a	7 August 1884	14 July 1930	
Sheffield	—N/a	1 December 1874	3 November 1986	Originally named Malvern.

=== Eyreton Branch ===
Name	Served by	Opened	Closed	Notes
Kaiapoi	—N/a	29 April 1872	13 October 1986 (freight)	
Waverley	—N/a	27 December 1875	31 March 1917	
Wilson's Siding	—N/a	18 October 1876	26 May 1954	
Wetheral	—N/a	c. May 1883	26 May 1954	
Ohoka	—N/a	27 December 1875	26 May 1954	
Mandeville North	—N/a	27 December 1875	26 May 1954	
Swannanoa	—N/a	27 December 1875	26 May 1954	
West Eyreton	—N/a	27 December 1875	19 April 1959	
School Road	—N/a	April 1884	26 May 1954	
Horrelville	—N/a	1 February 1878	26 May 1954	
Bennetts Junction	—N/a	1 February 1878	19 April 1959	

=== Other stations ===
Name	Served by	Opened	Closed	Notes
Ferrymead	—N/a	30 December 1863	9 November 1867	Terminus of the Ferrymead Railway. Re-opened briefly in 1868.
Christchurch (Addington)	TranzAlpine, Coastal Pacific	5 April 1993	–	Replaced the Moorhouse Avenue station.
Ferrymead	Ferrymead Historic Park	3 December 1977	–	Heritage railway.
Moorhouse	Ferrymead Historic Park	3 December 1977	–	Heritage railway.

== Stations ==
=== Addington ===
Until the 1970s, Addington was a major facility for the receiving and sale of livestock, with significant stock yards, races and loading platforms beside the track. It handled livestock traffic from as far afield as Marlborough, South Canterbury and the West Coast, with the proceeds of the sales destined for locations all over the South Island. Given the limited size of the lorry transport available at the time, it is understandable how the railways could compete with road transport for this type of traffic, even for relatively short distances.

One particularly sought-after source of livestock for Addington was the sheep of the Molesworth cattle and sheep station in Marlborough. From 1957 until about 1970, this livestock was driven to the railhead at Culverden (on the Waiau Branch line) then transported in several trains to Addington. In the last years of this traffic, there were in excess of 1,000 head to move, requiring a substantial portion of the cattle wagon fleet in the South Island.

When the workshops closed, it was decided to locate the new Christchurch railway station on the site for long distance trains (opened on 5 April 1993), see Christchurch railway station, New Zealand § Third station.

Today, the passenger facilities are gone, but the site still retains a signal box, several loops and railsheds for the storage of rolling stock. The land formerly occupied by the saleyards is currently a vacant lot.

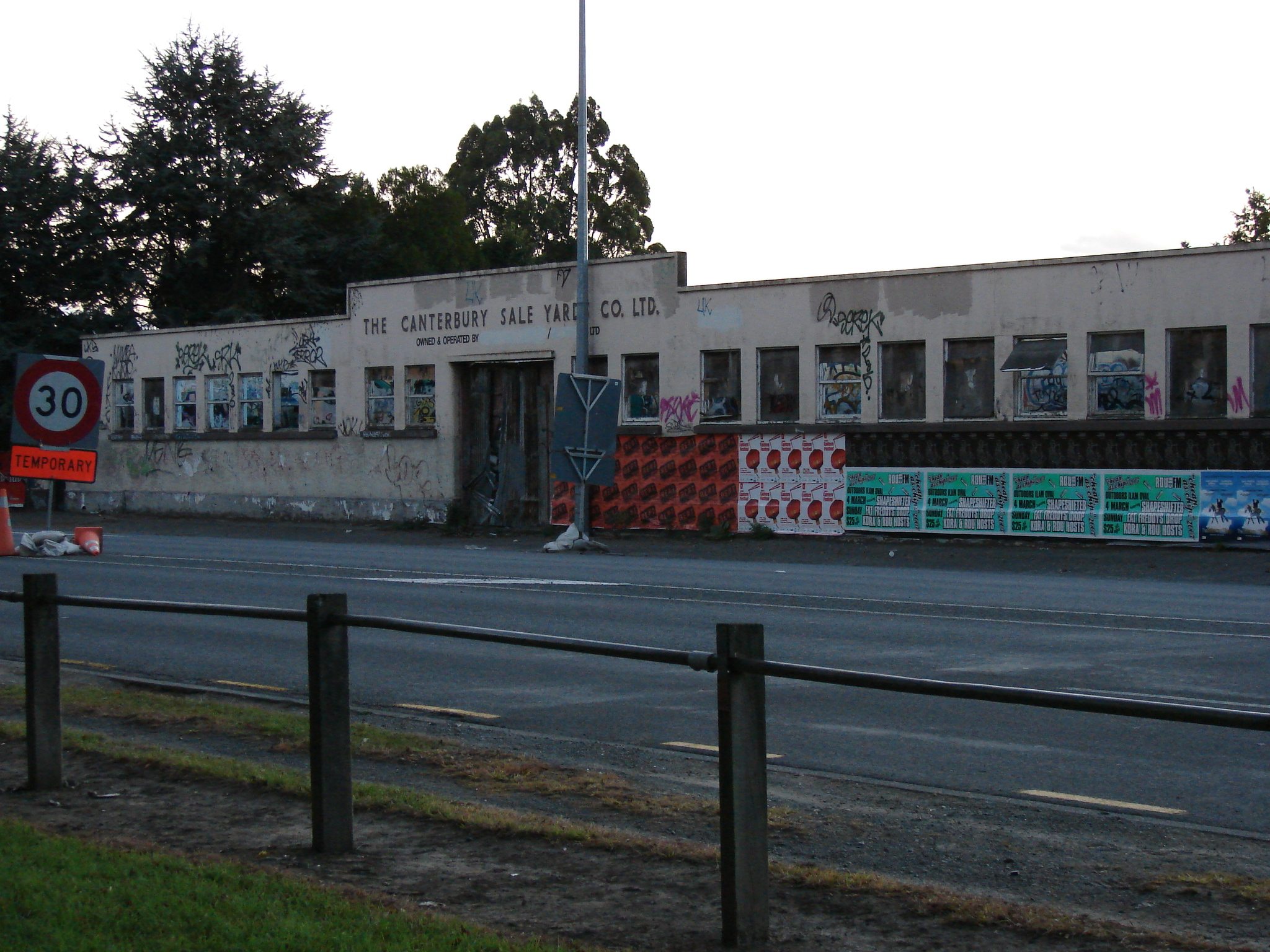
The former saleyards building.

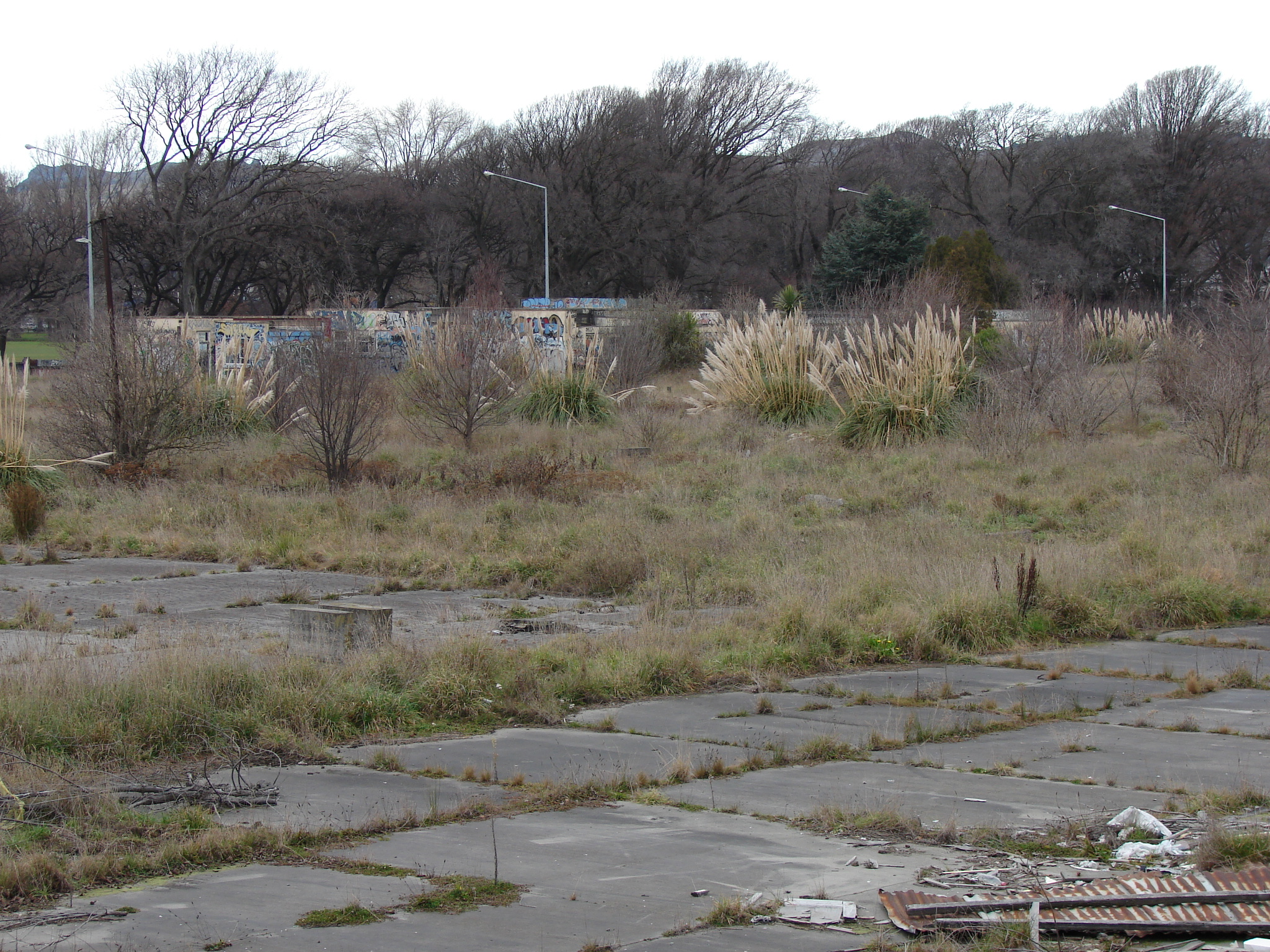
Saleyards land and rear of the saleyards building.

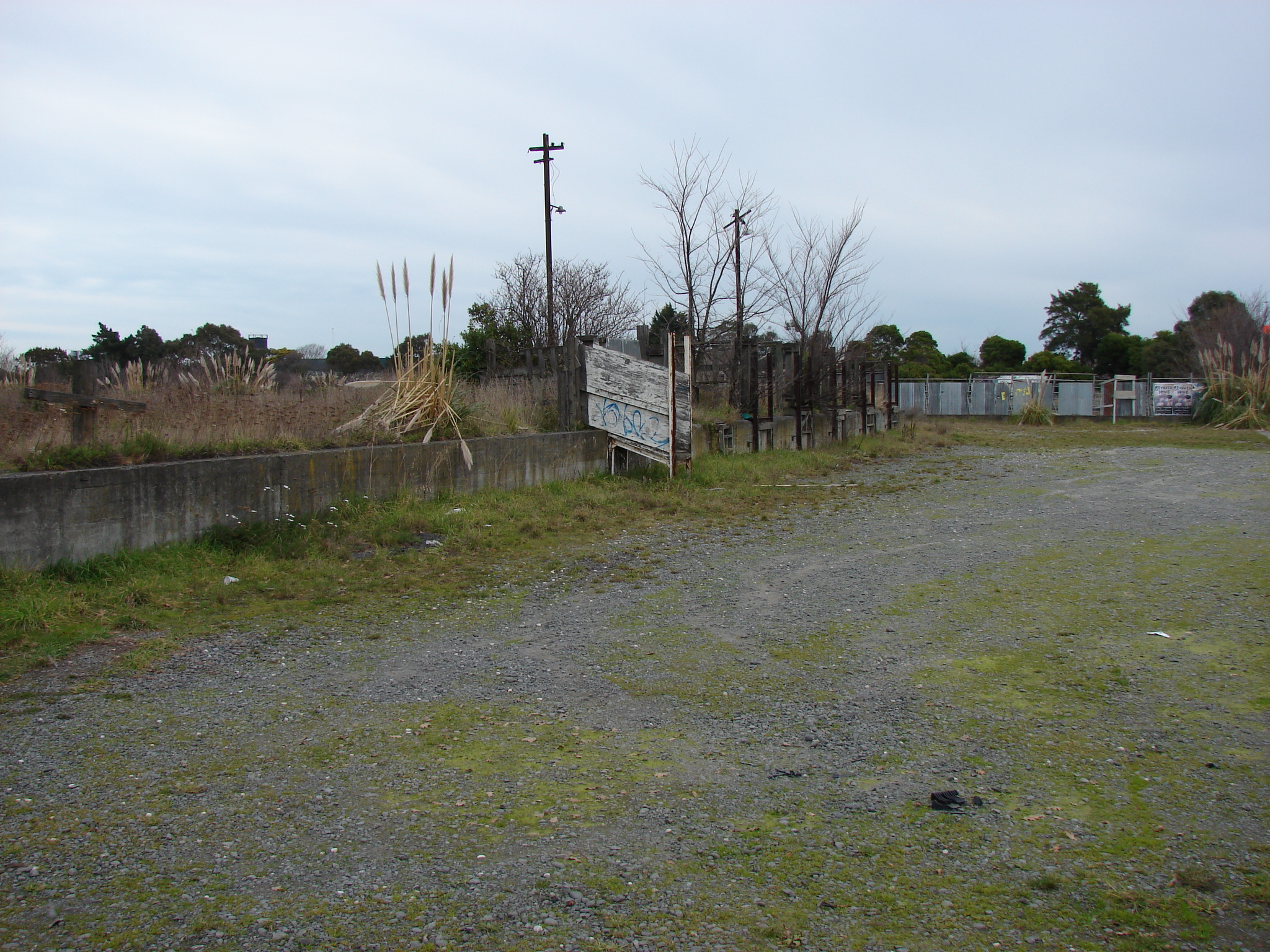
Loading races for stock trucks.

=== Bryndwr ===
This station served passenger trains for residents of the suburbs of Bryndwr and Elmwood. Nothing of the station remains.

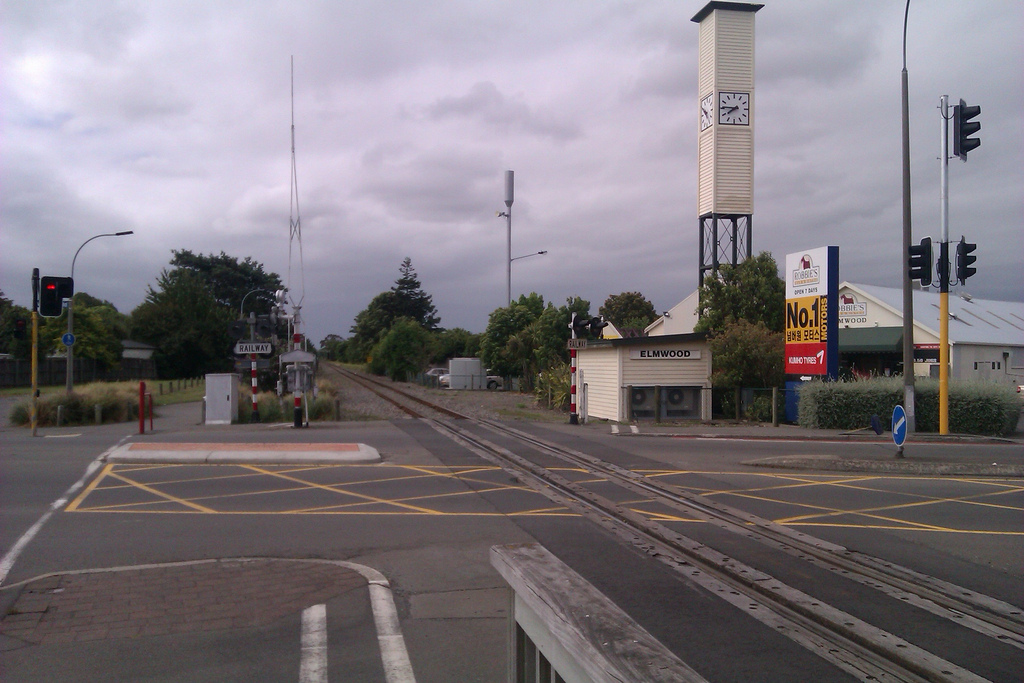
Looking north towards Papanui at Wairakei Road.

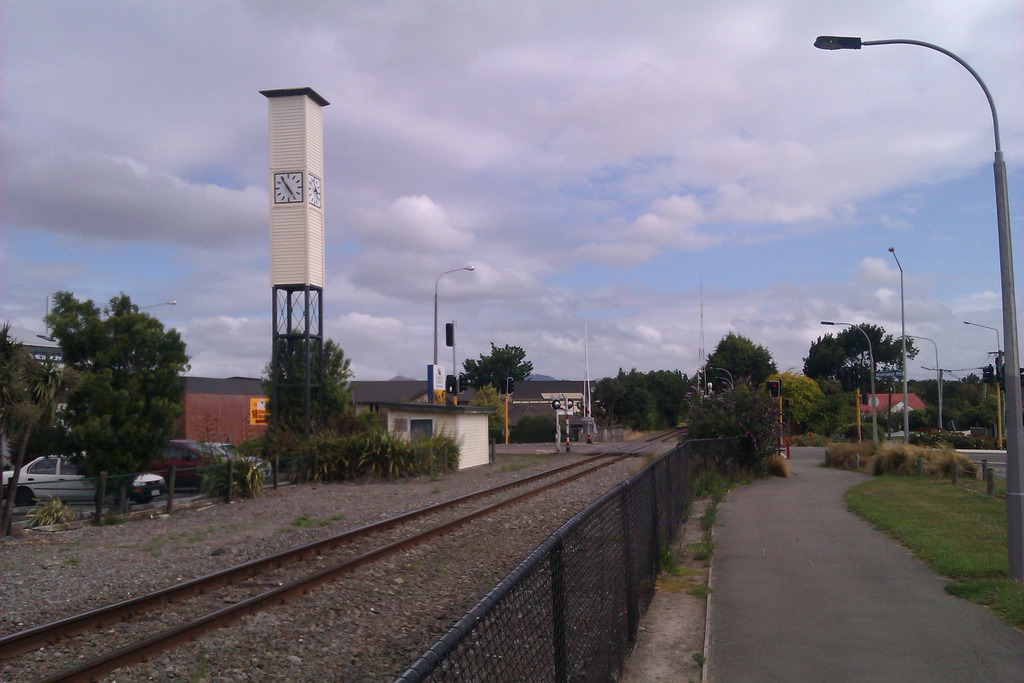
looking south towards Riccarton.

=== Burnham ===
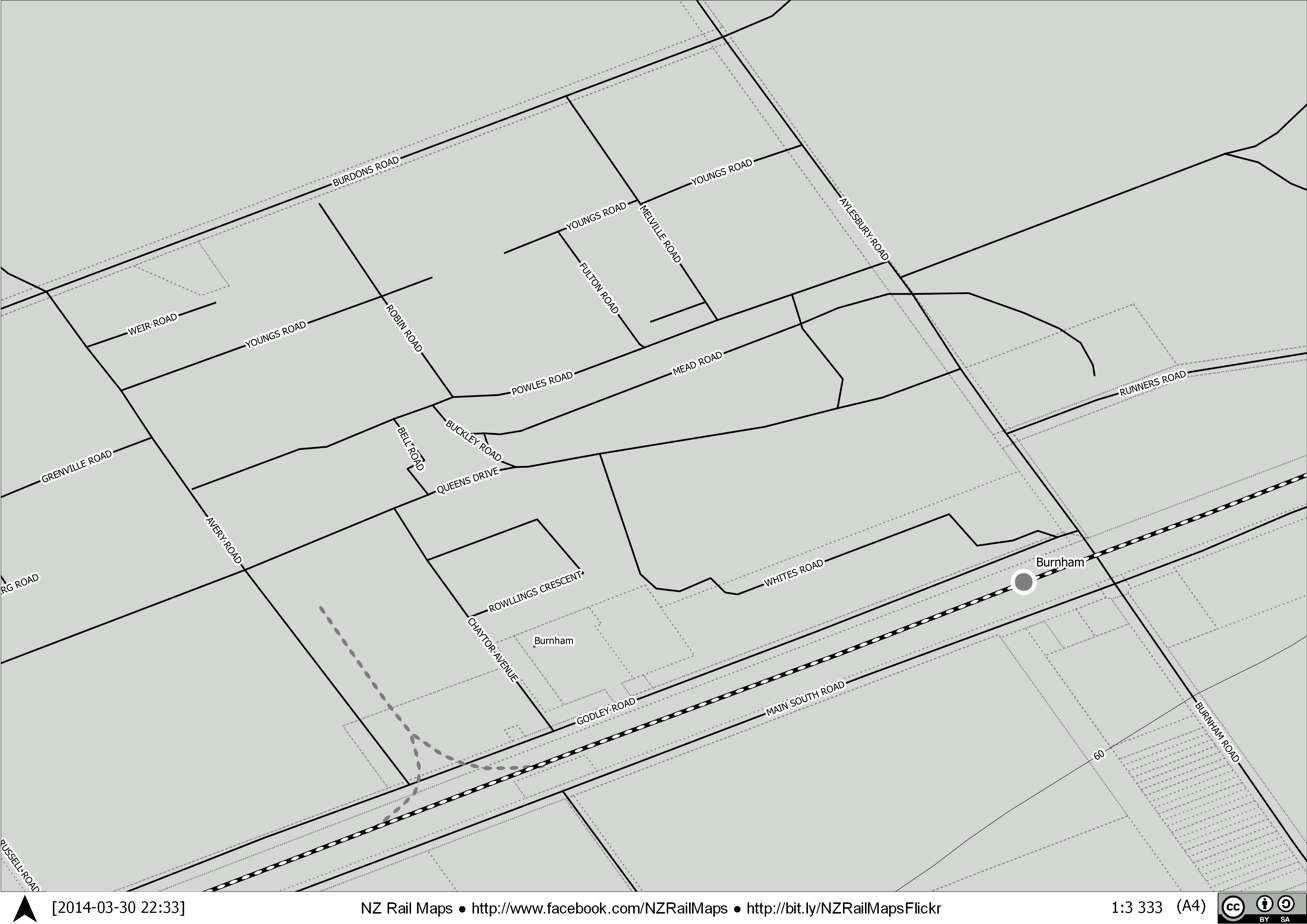
Map of Burnham

=== Christchurch ===
The current Christchurch station at Troup Drive is the third railway Christchurch station. The two earlier stations, at Madras Street and Moorhouse Avenue, were a short distance away to the east on the Main South Line, closer to the city centre.

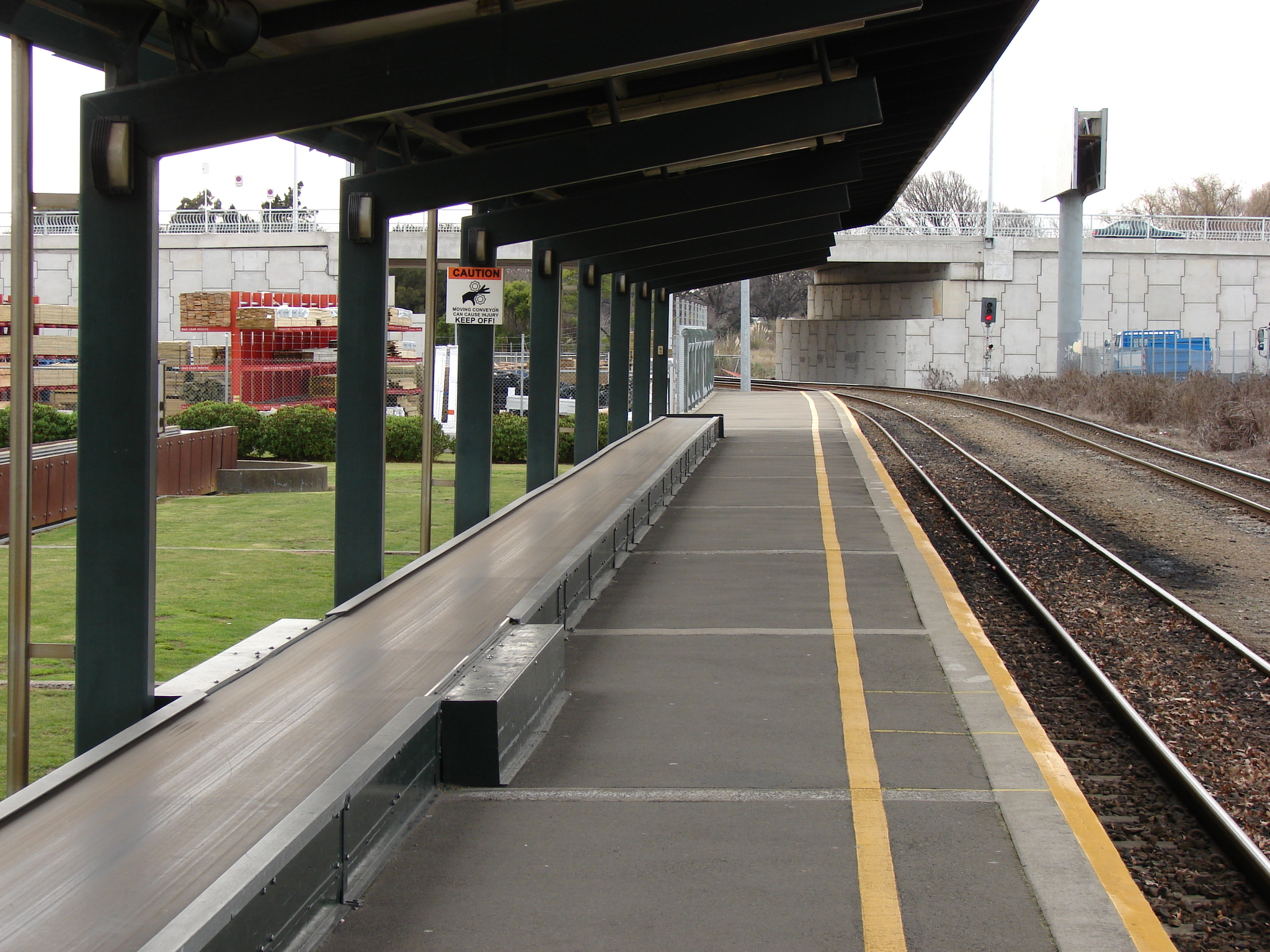
Christchurch platform and baggage conveyor, looking at the line passing beneath the new Blenheim Road overbridge.

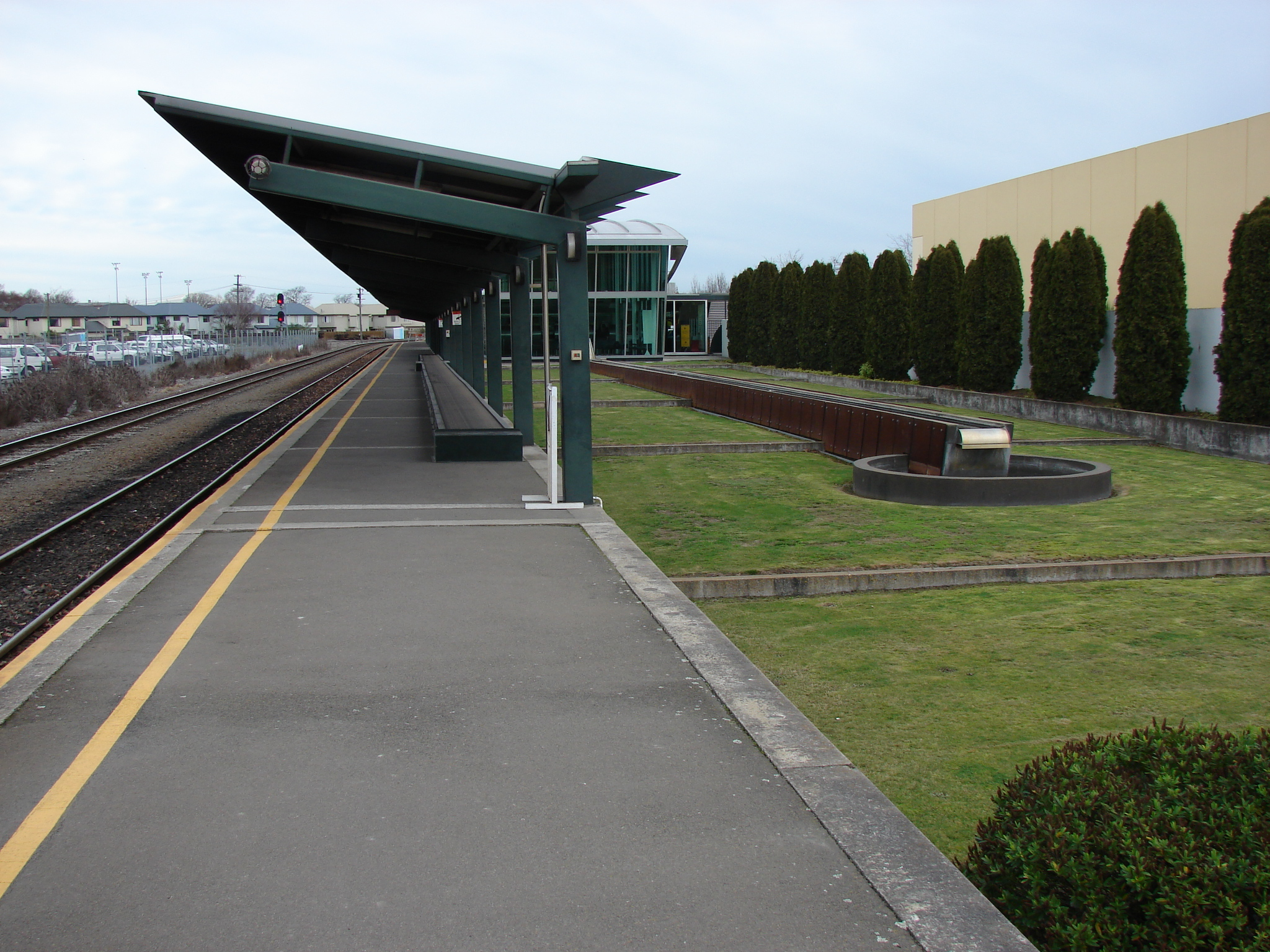
Christchurch platform and building, looking in the direction of Addington junction.

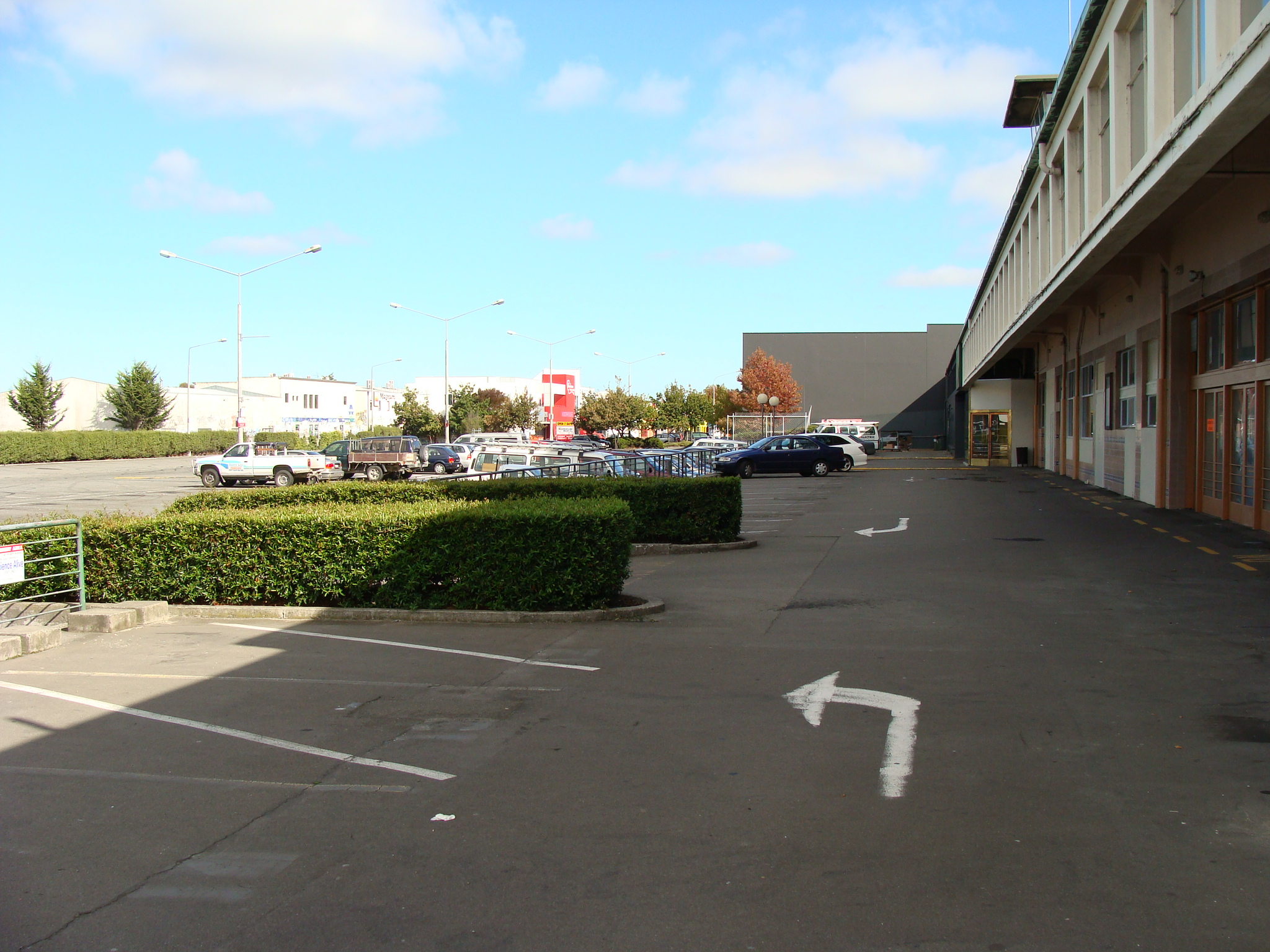
Main platform and former station yard area at Moorhouse Avenue.

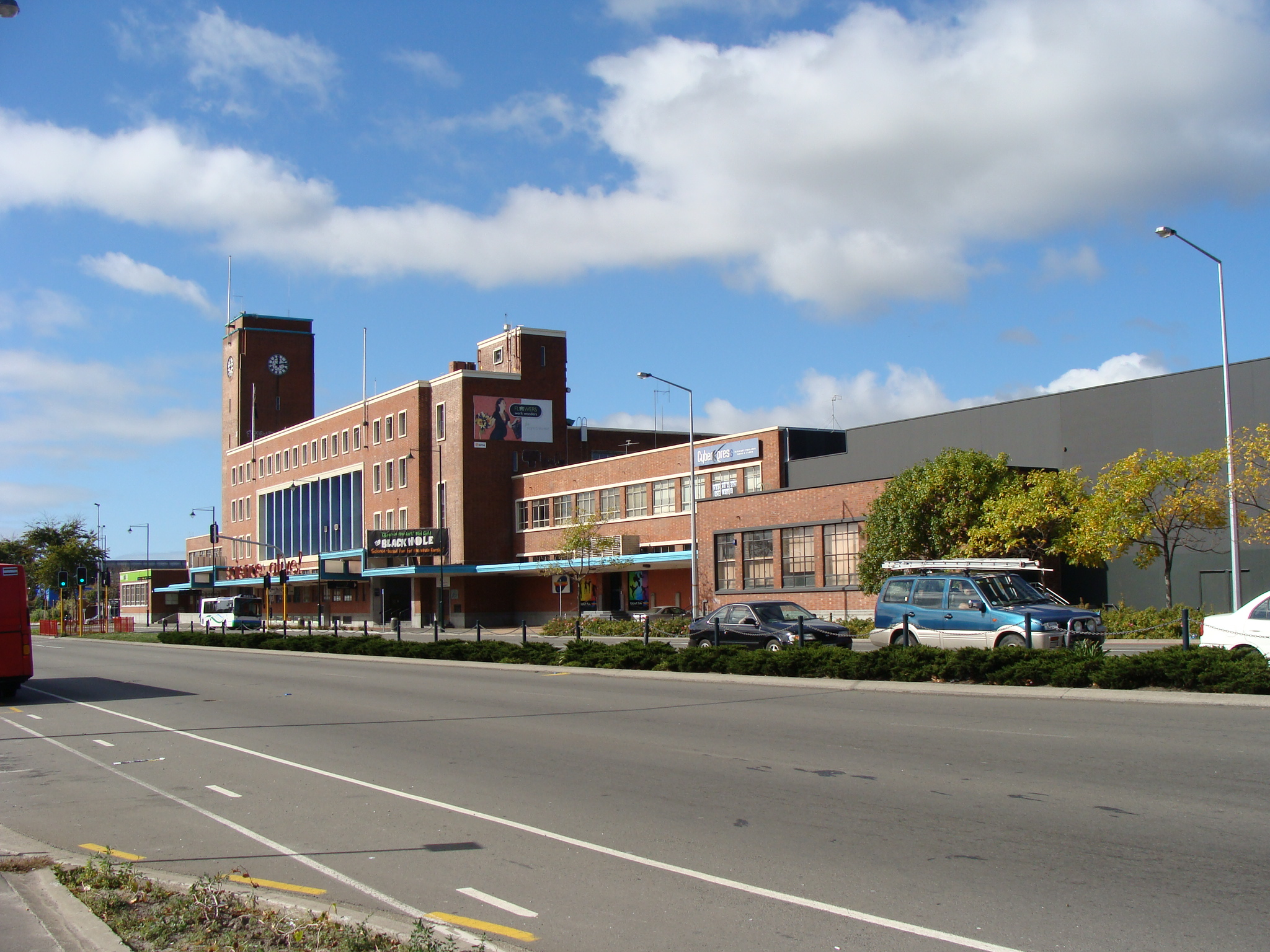
Christchurch railway station building, Moorhouse Avenue.

=== Heathcote ===
Originally known as The Valley, this station was sited about 240 metres from the mouth of the Lyttelton rail tunnel. It was equipped with a signal box, freight sidings for nearby industrial customers as well as passenger facilities and a platform, which is the only remaining feature. Public access is from Station Road, at the intersection with Flavell Street, Marsden Street and Rollin Street.

The signal box, constructed in 1870, was to have been moved to the Ferrymead Heritage Park for use in the rail operations there after many years of disuse until it was destroyed on-site by fire in September 1996, shortly before its relocation.

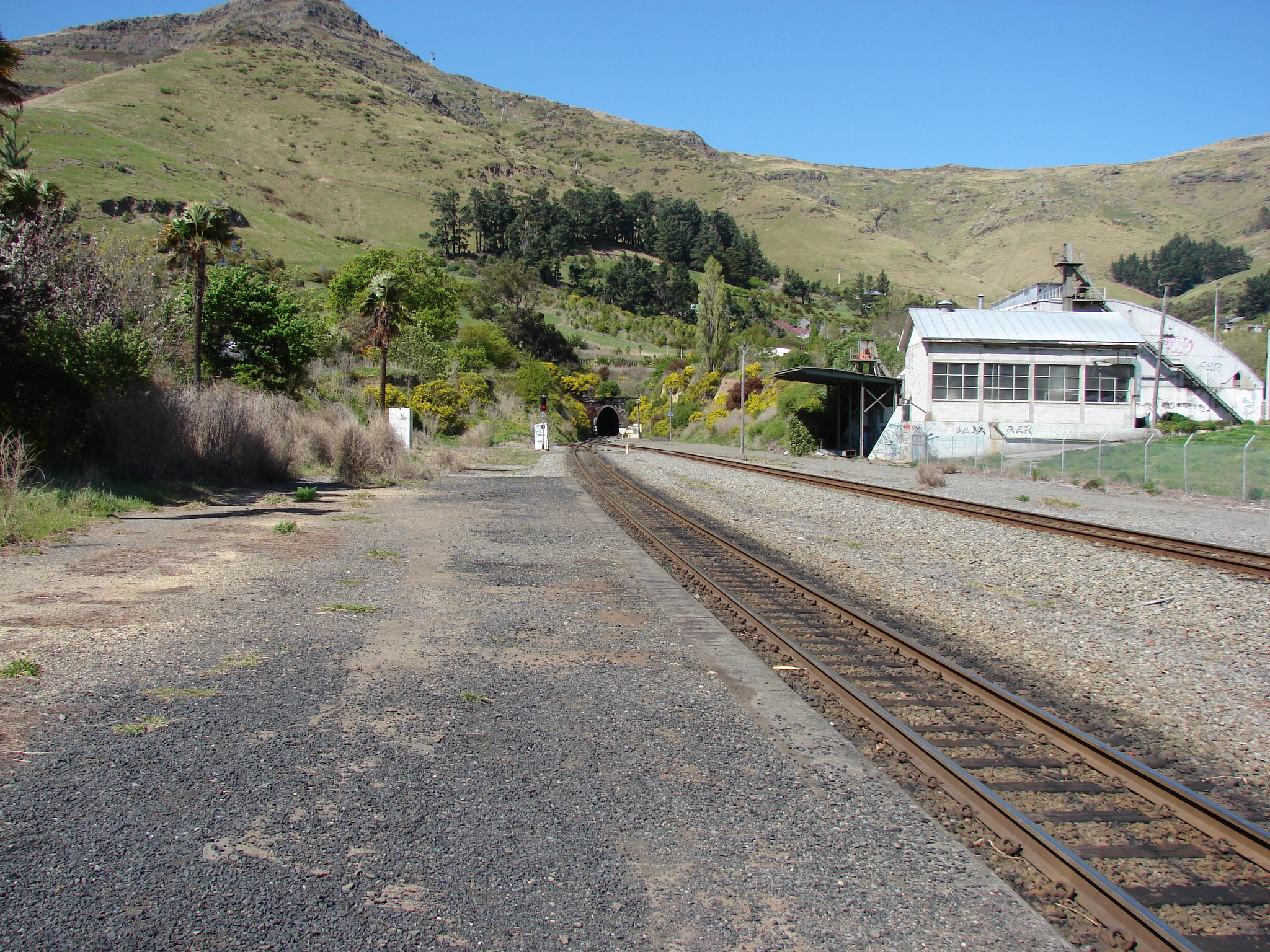
Looking along the Heathcote station platform in the direction of the Lyttelton rail tunnel.

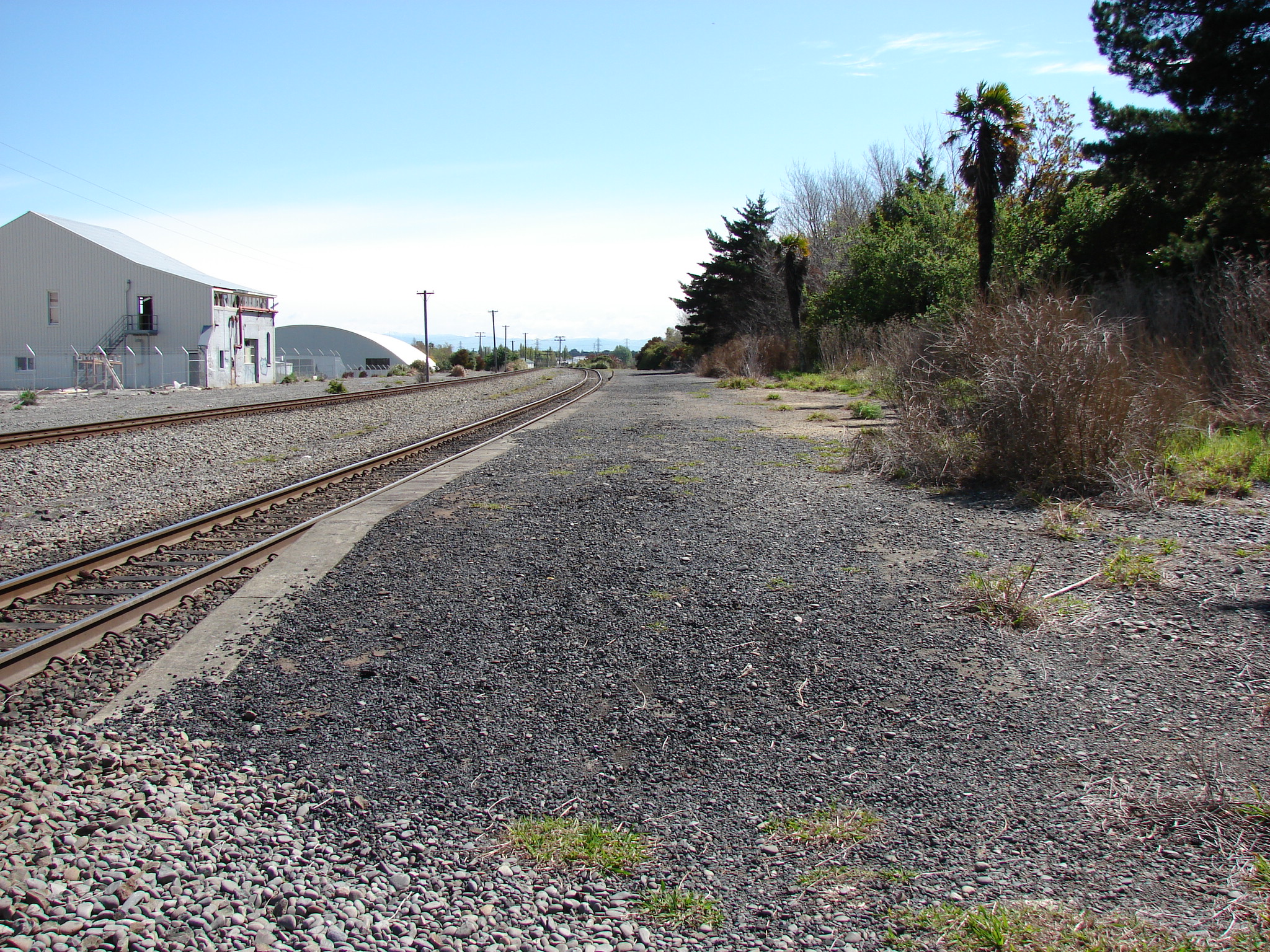
Looking along the Heathcote station platform in the direction of Ferrymead.

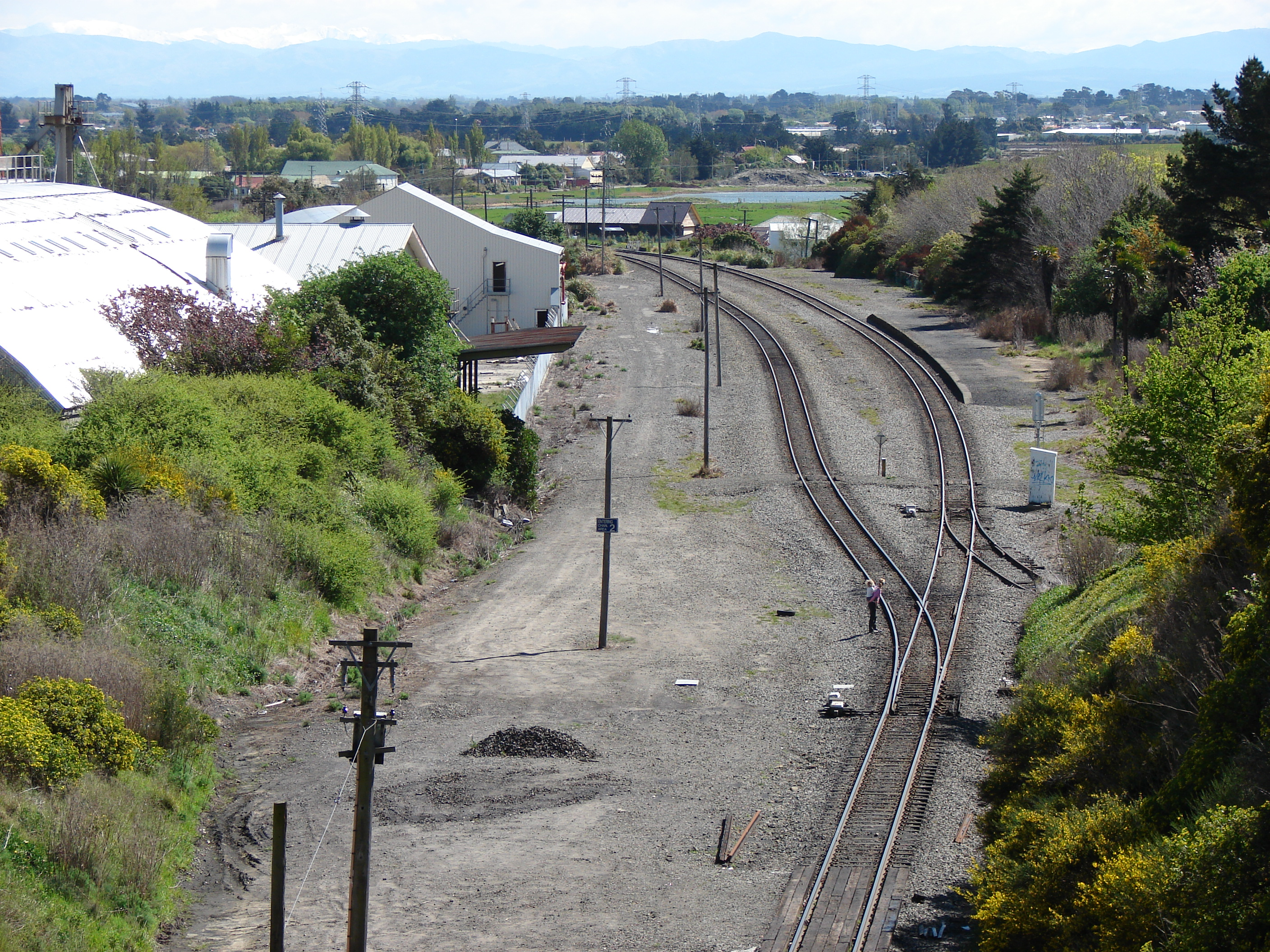
Overview of the former Heathcote station site showing the only remnant of the station still visible, its platform. The Main South Line disappears into the Lyttelton rail tunnel beneath where this picture was taken from.

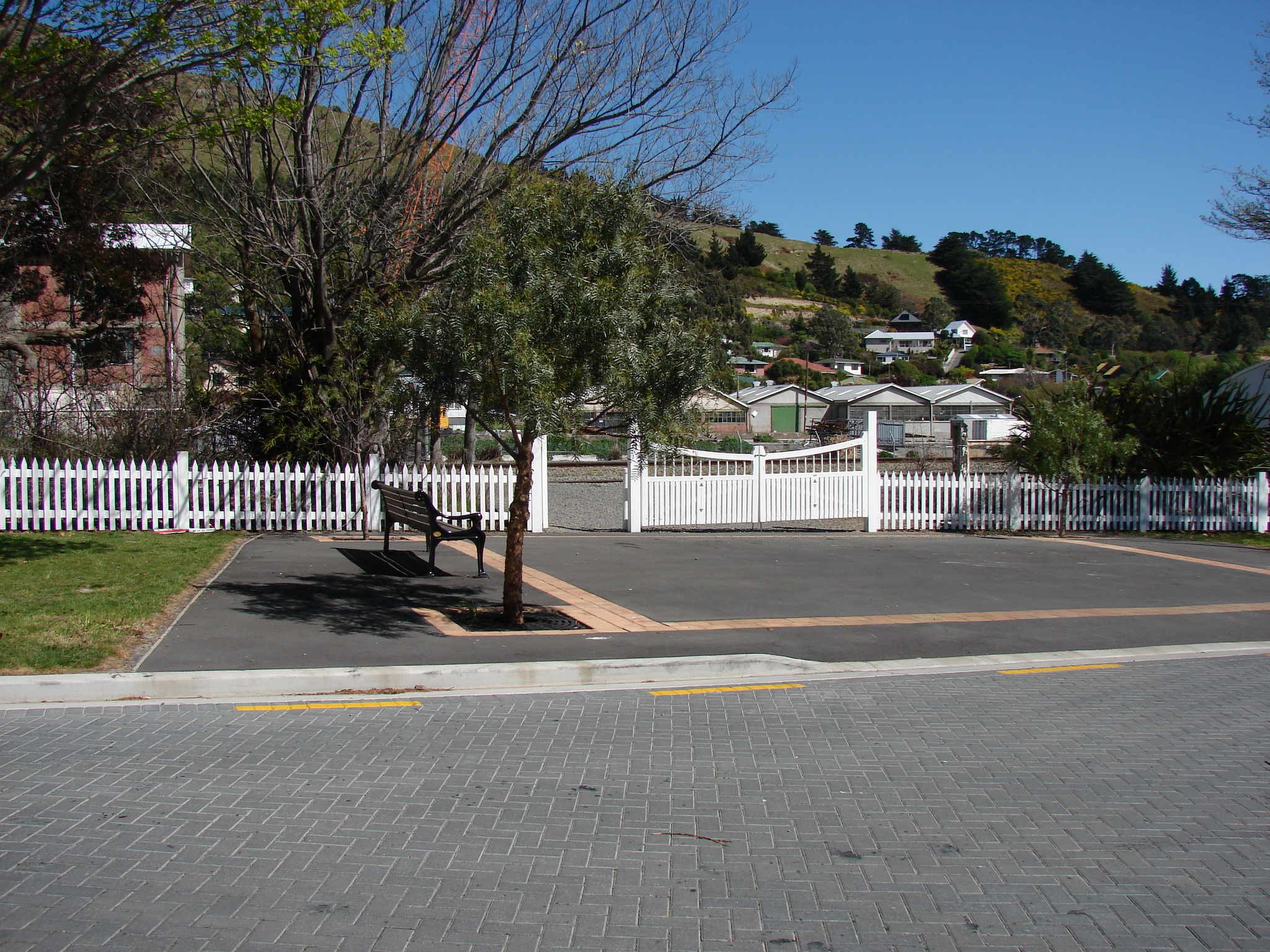
Public access to the Heathcote station platform is gained through this gate from Station Road.

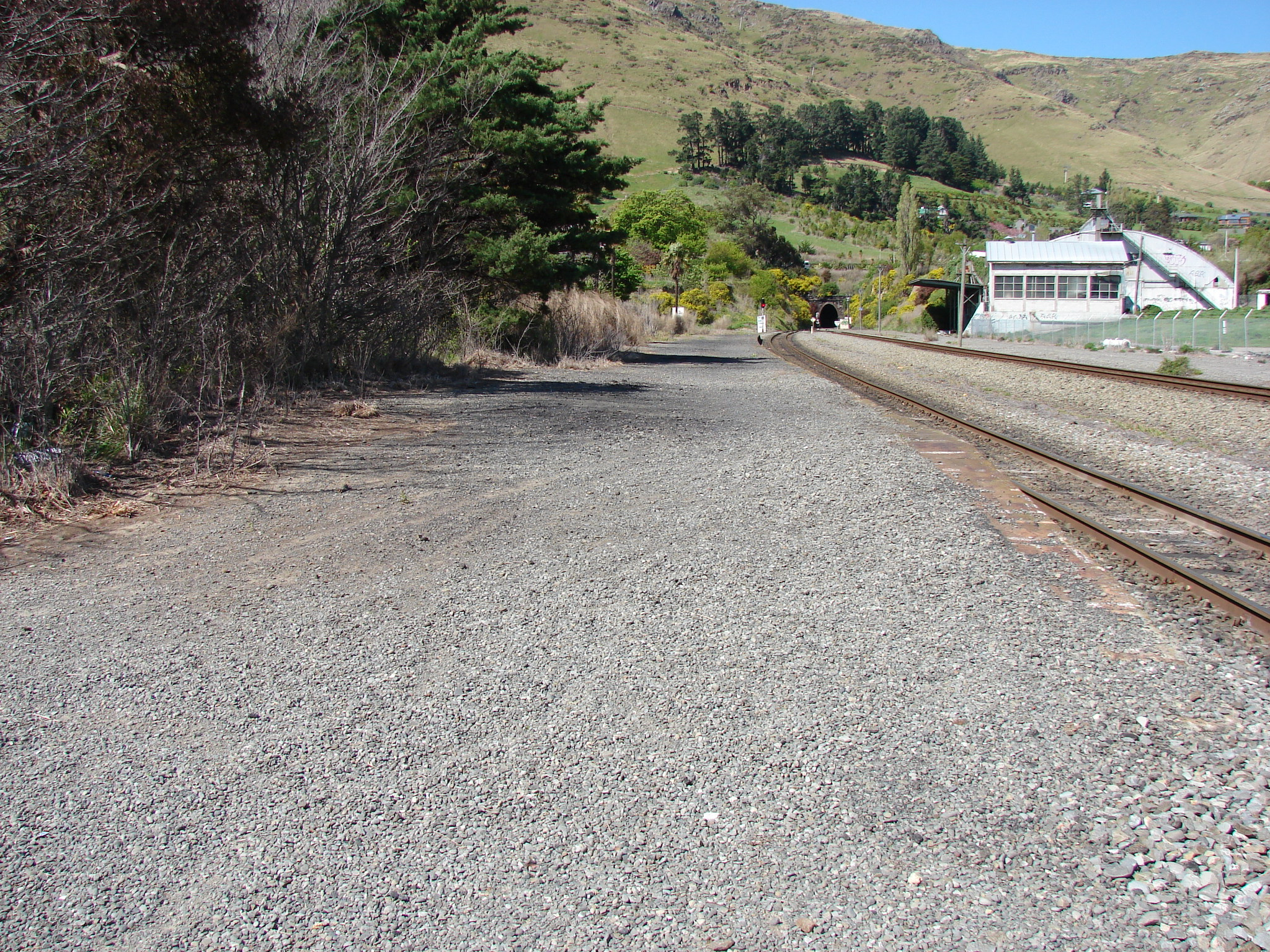
Looking along the Heathcote station platform in the direction of the Lyttelton rail tunnel.

=== Kainga ===
The station at Kainga was a small rural station to serve the settlement of Kainga. Nothing of the station remains. The Main North Line through Kainga was opened on 1 September 1958 as a deviation when the Waimakariri River Bridge at Stewarts Gully was replaced with a new structure 1.6 km upstream.

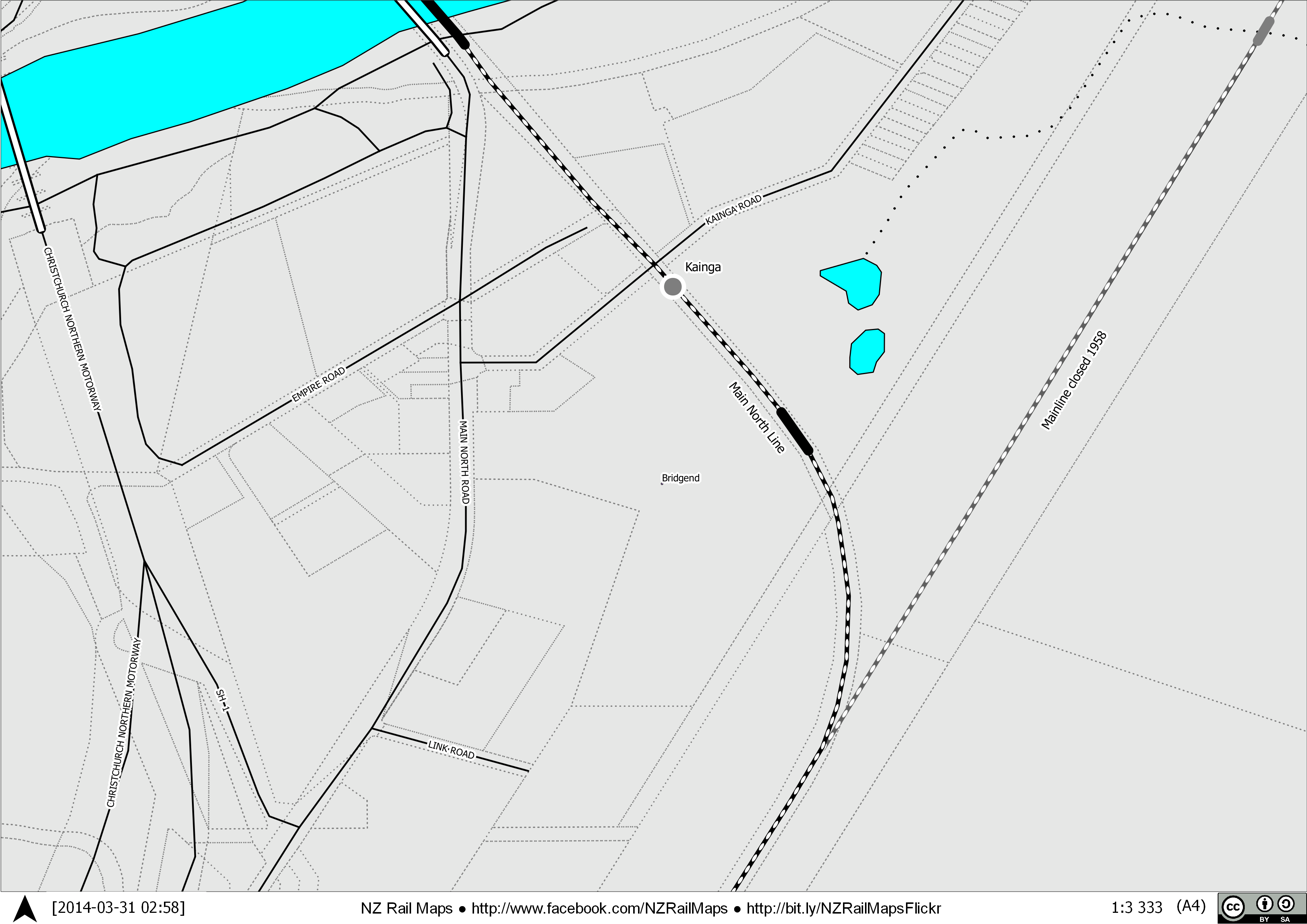
Map of Kainga

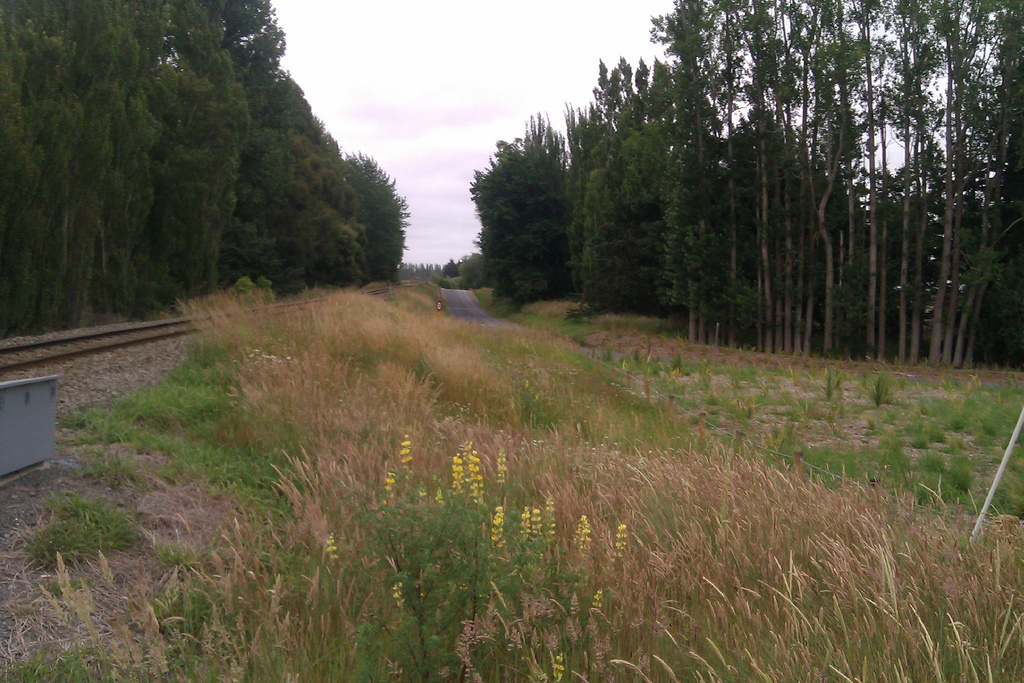
Looking North from station site.

=== Ladbrooks ===
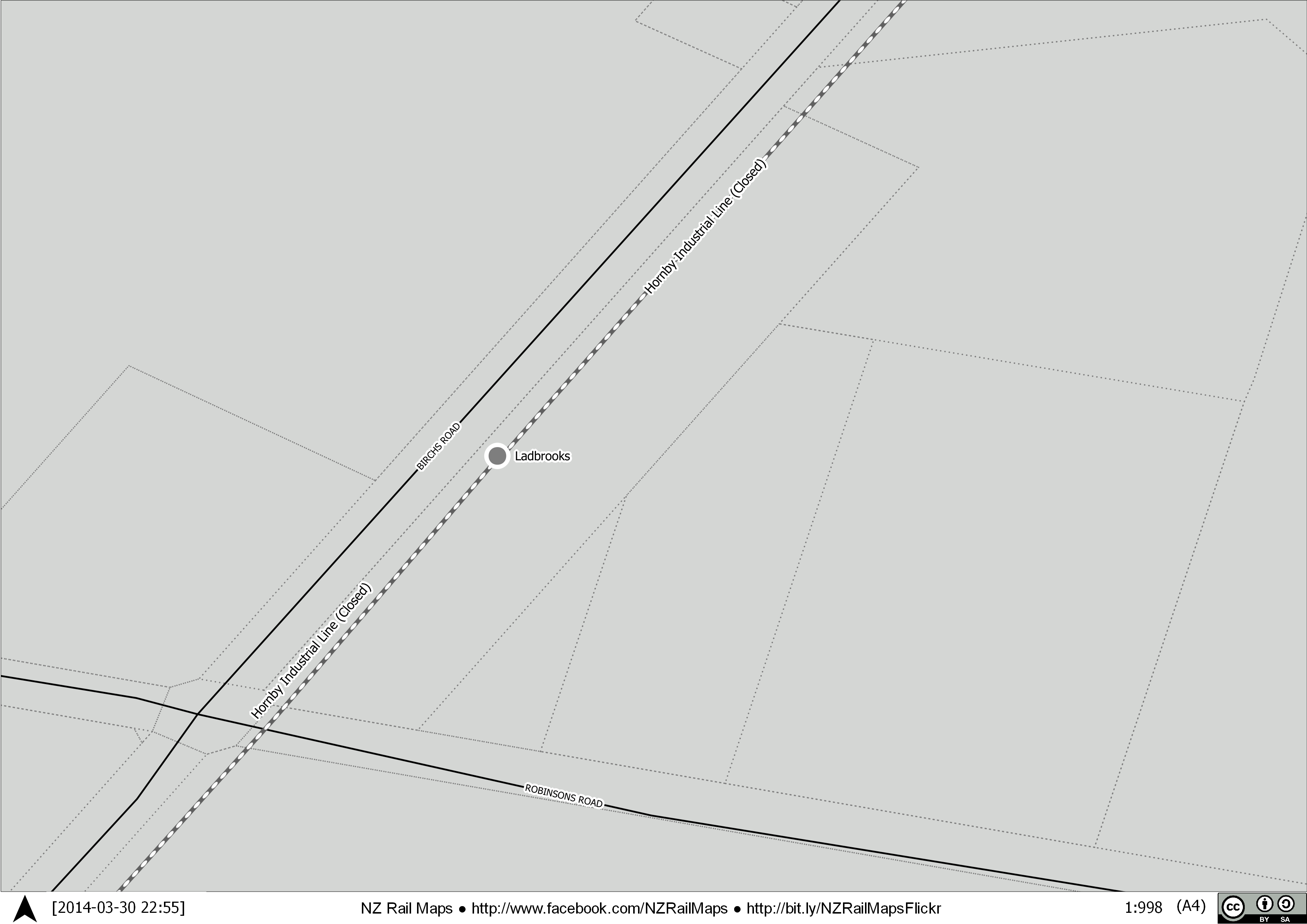
Map of Ladbrooks

=== Lincoln ===
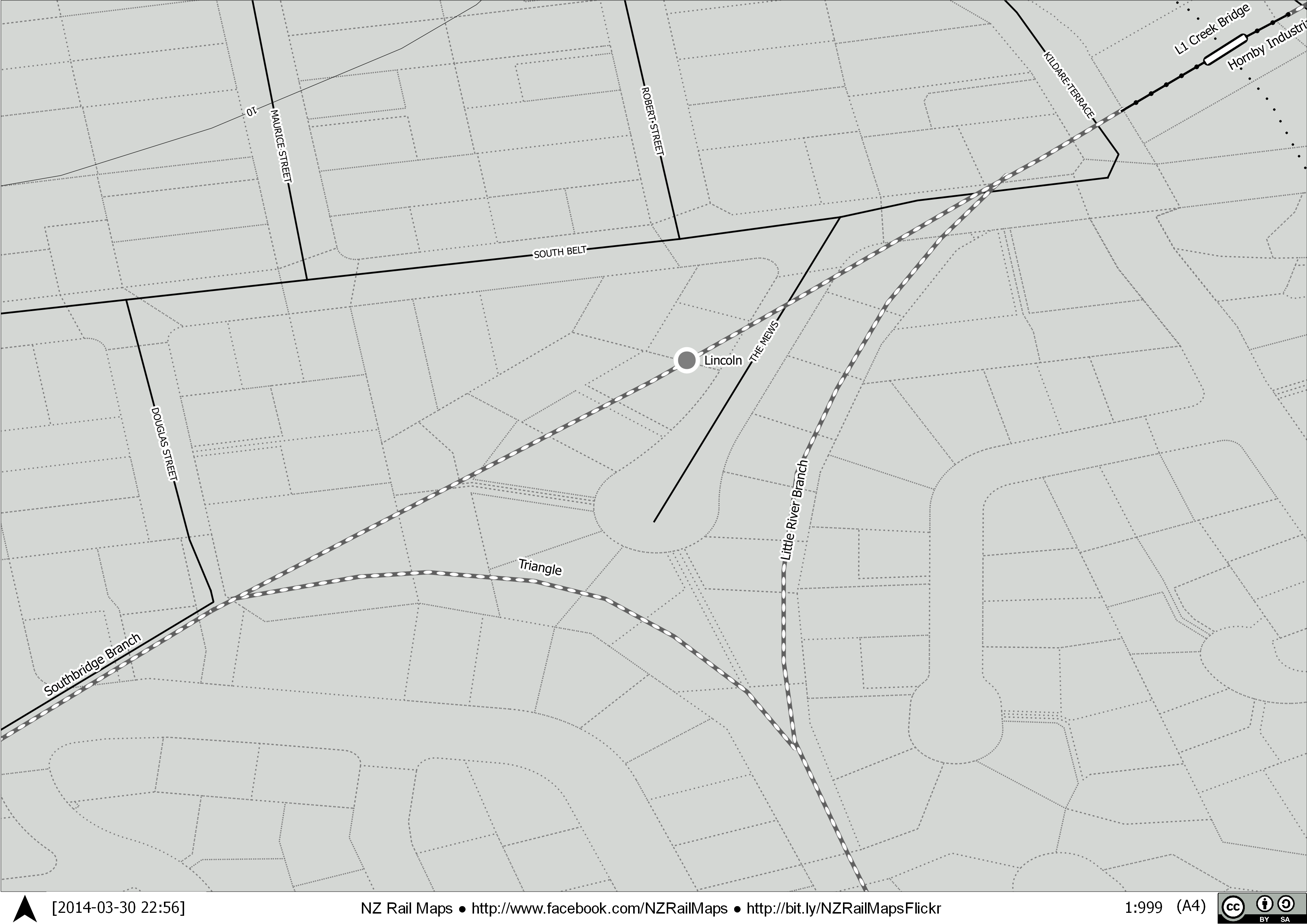
Map of Lincoln

=== Linwood ===
One of the "younger" stations on the line, Linwood was not built by the provincial council. Nothing remains of the station today, though it continued to serve in a rail capacity as the location of a locomotive depot until the depot was damaged beyond repair in the 2011 Christchurch earthquake and subsequently demolished, with the services it provided relocated to Middleton.

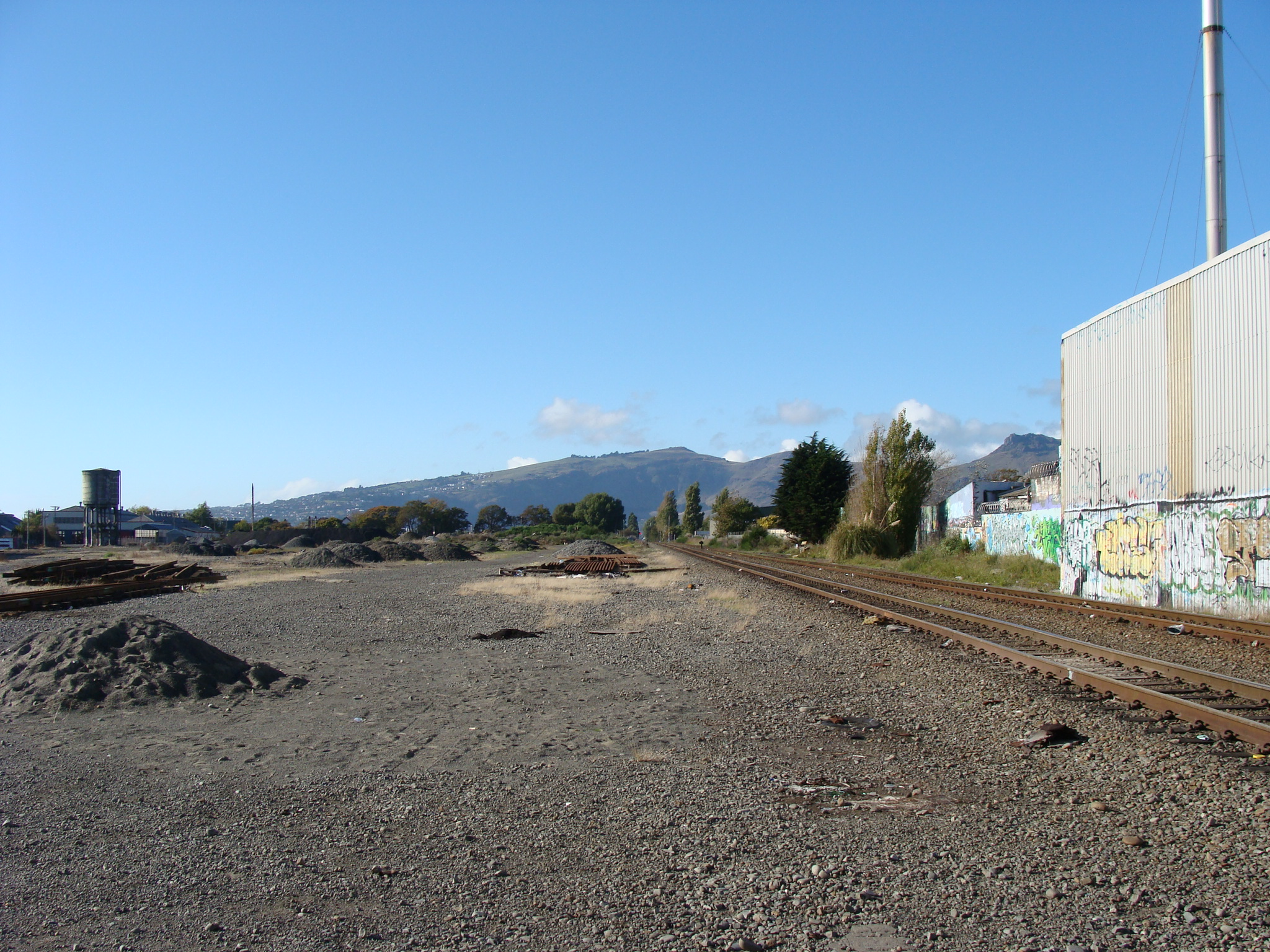
Site of the Linwood railway station.

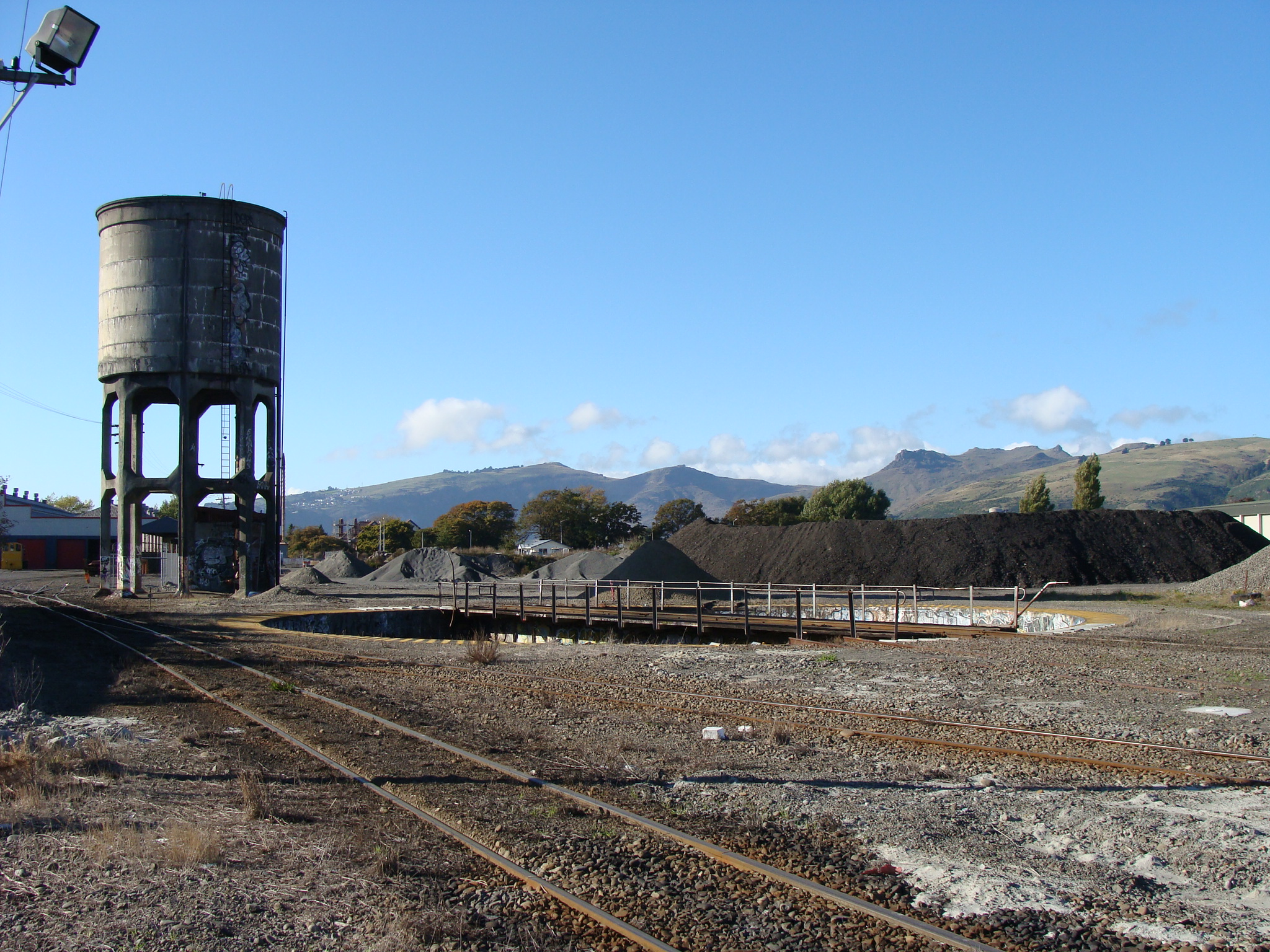
Water tower and turntable at the Linwood station site.

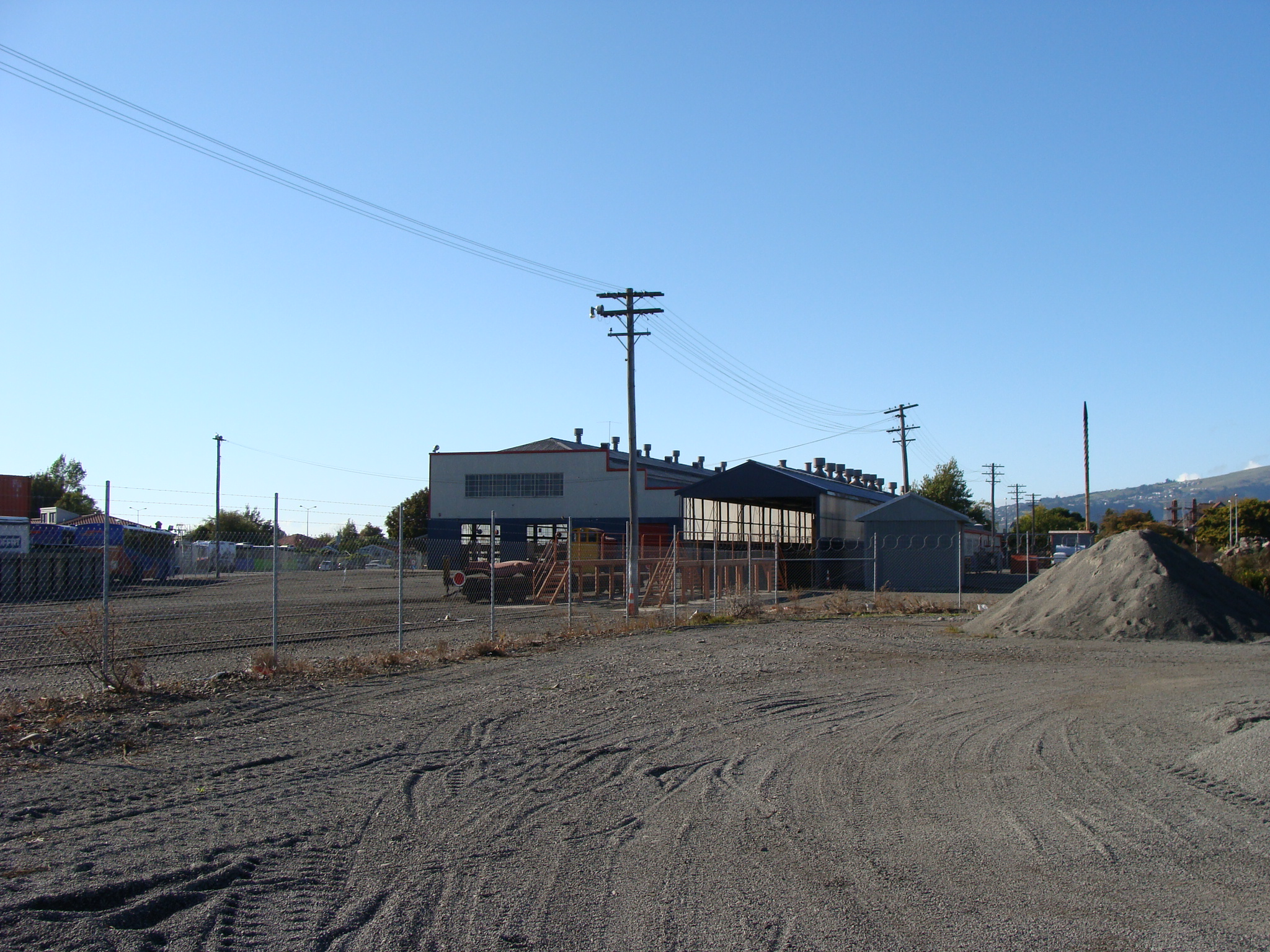
Linwood Locomotive Depot.

=== Little River ===
The Little River station has been well preserved by the local community, who have converted into a centre that sells local craft and historical items. The platform and goods shed are still in good repair, and some metres of trackage have been installed so that a number of preserved freight wagons can be displayed.

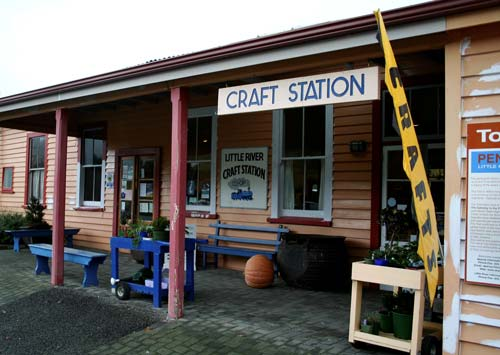
The Little River railway station on Banks Peninsula, these days used as a tourist information, craft shop and public toilets.

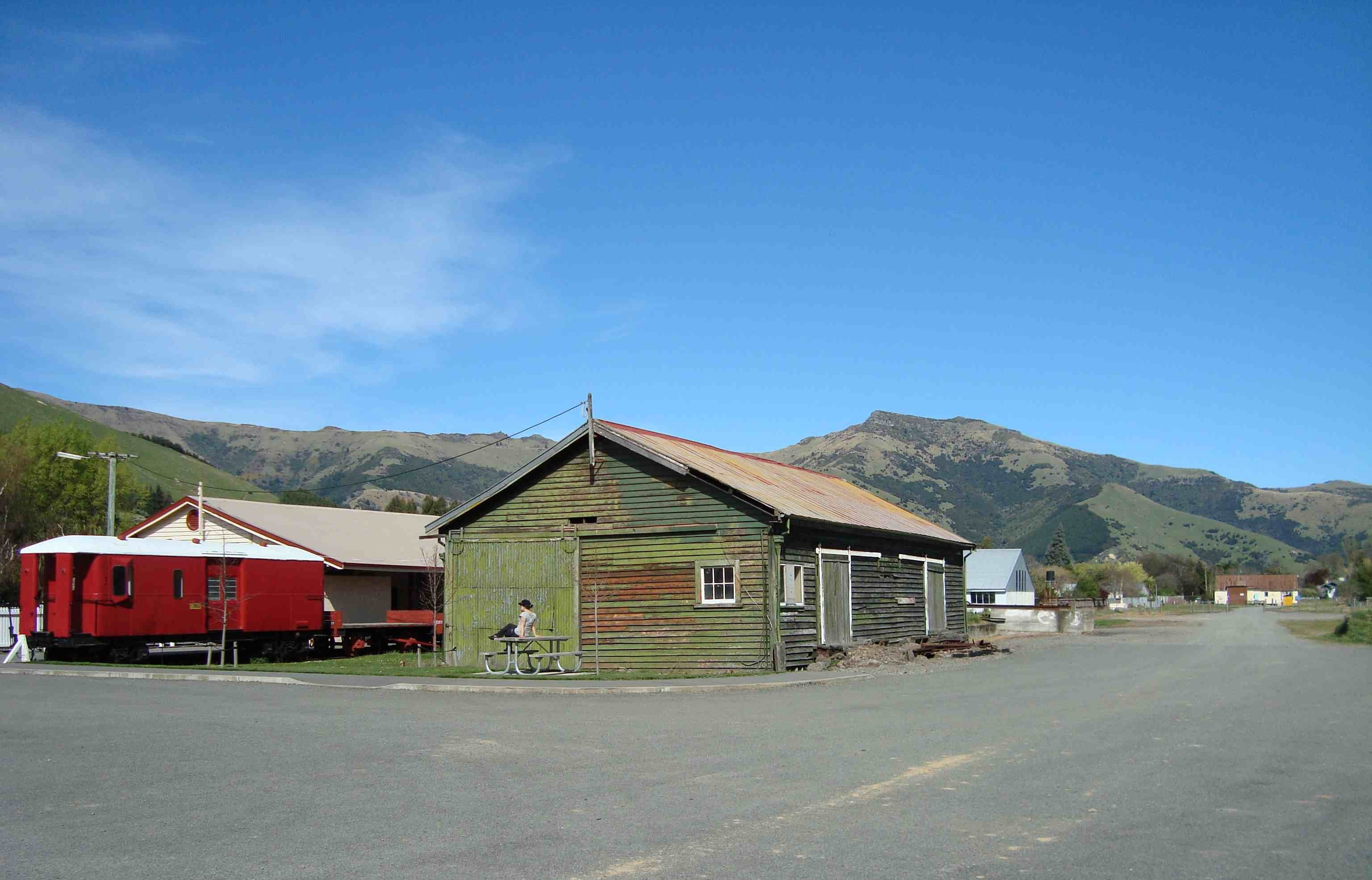
View from the northern side of the surprisingly large former yard at Little River. The main road from Christchurch to Akaroa runs behind the station, which is visible above the guard's van.

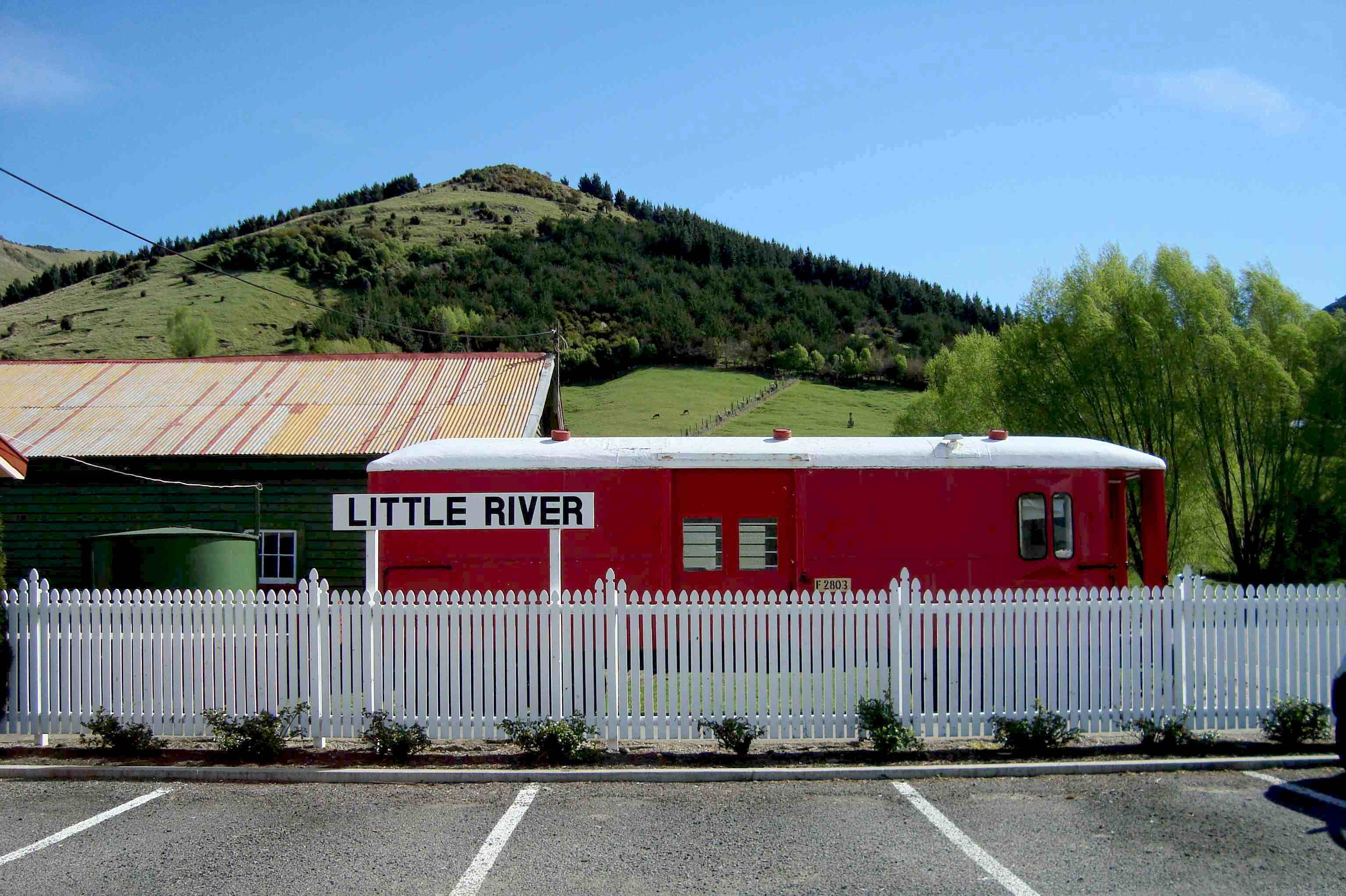
A wagon parked at the Little River Railway Station.

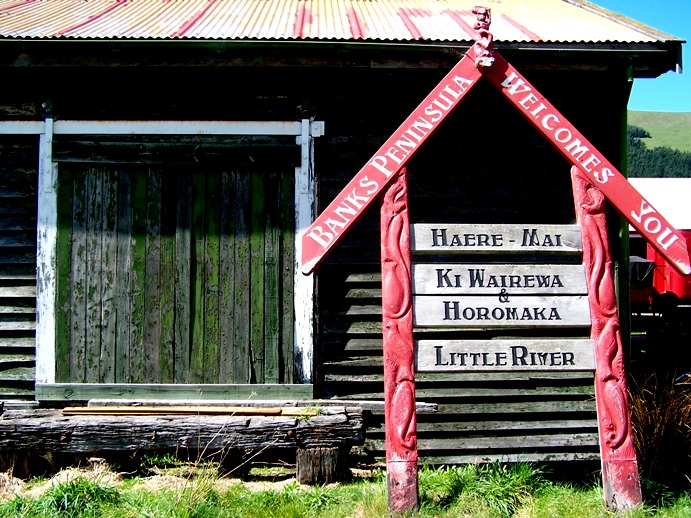
Welcome sign leaning against the goods shed of the Little River Railway Station.

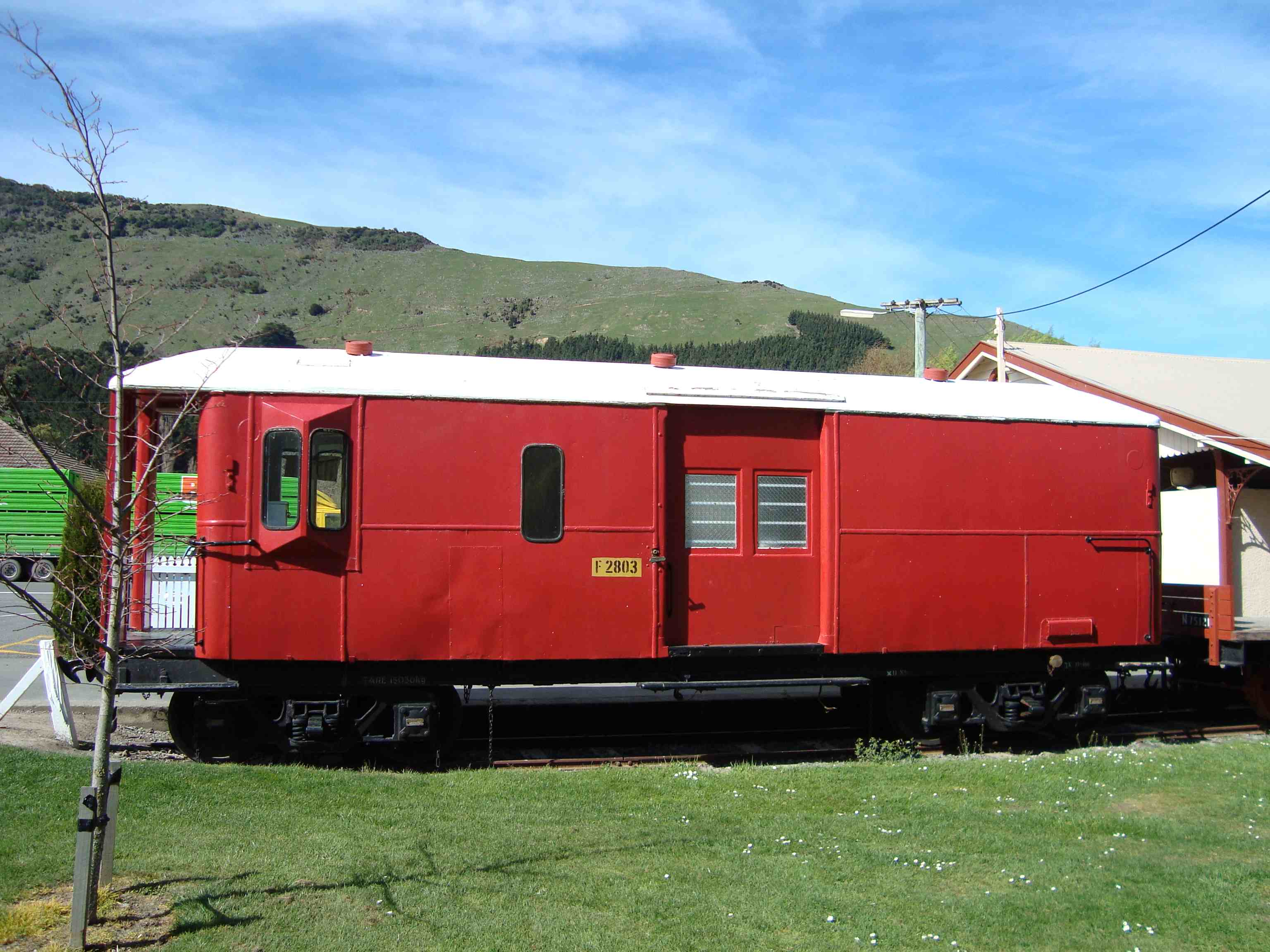
A Guard's Van at the Little River Railway Station.

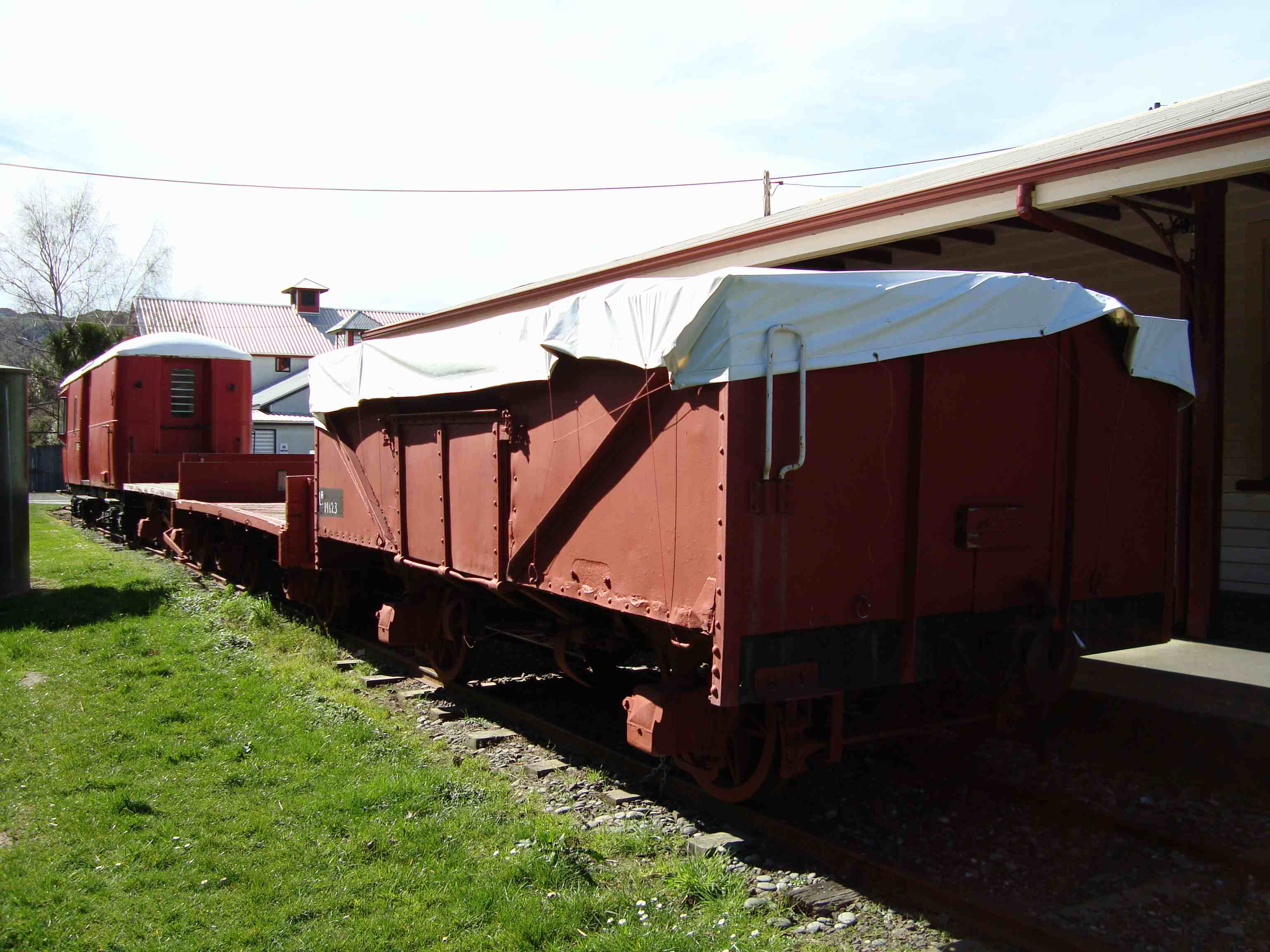
La Class open wagon, two N Class flat wagons, and a guard's van sit in the yard at Little River on a small section of track.

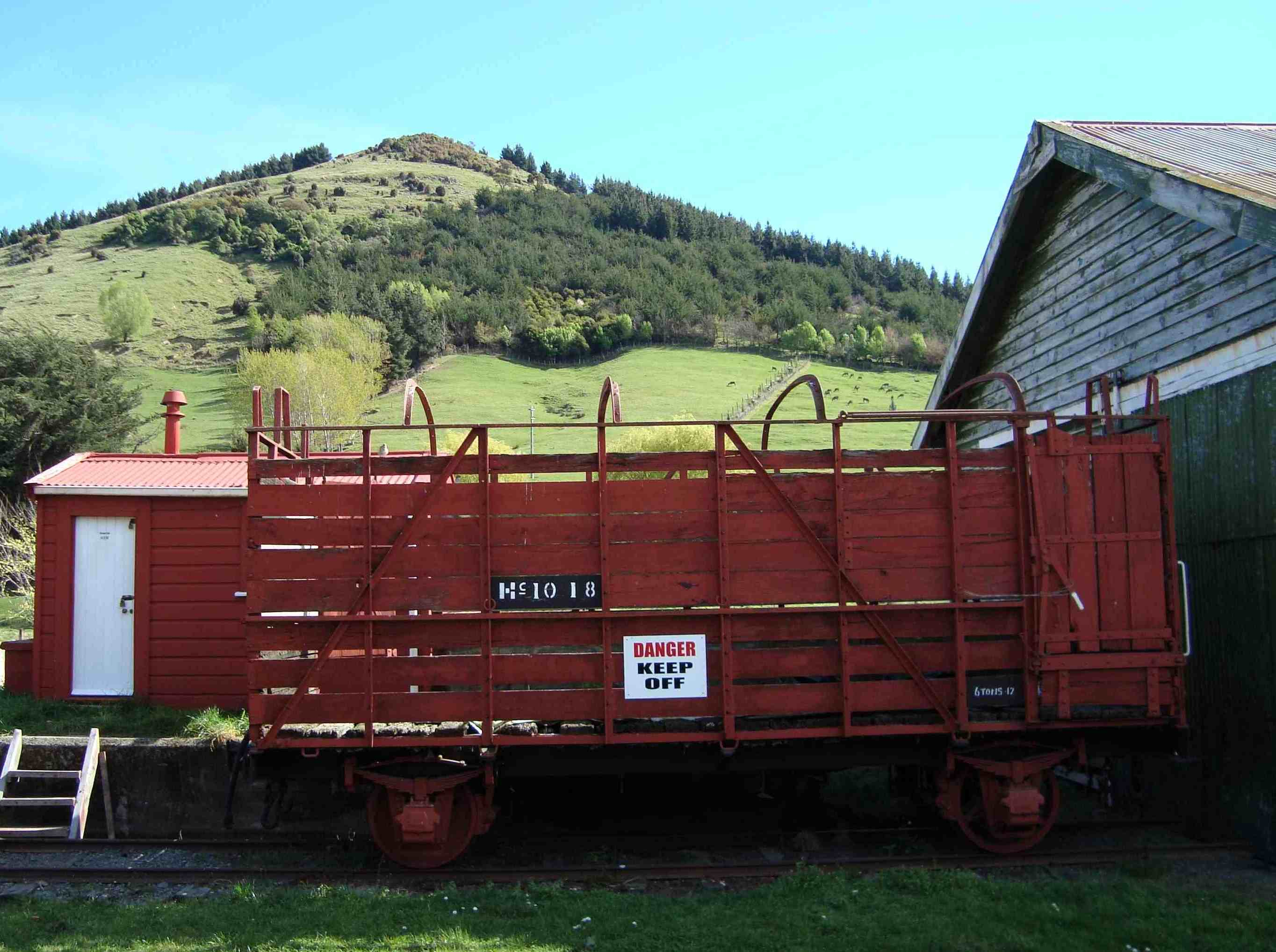
Hc Class cattle wagon HC1018 and ganger's hut (on loading bank) at Little River. A notable omission are the running boards that should be on top of the roof.

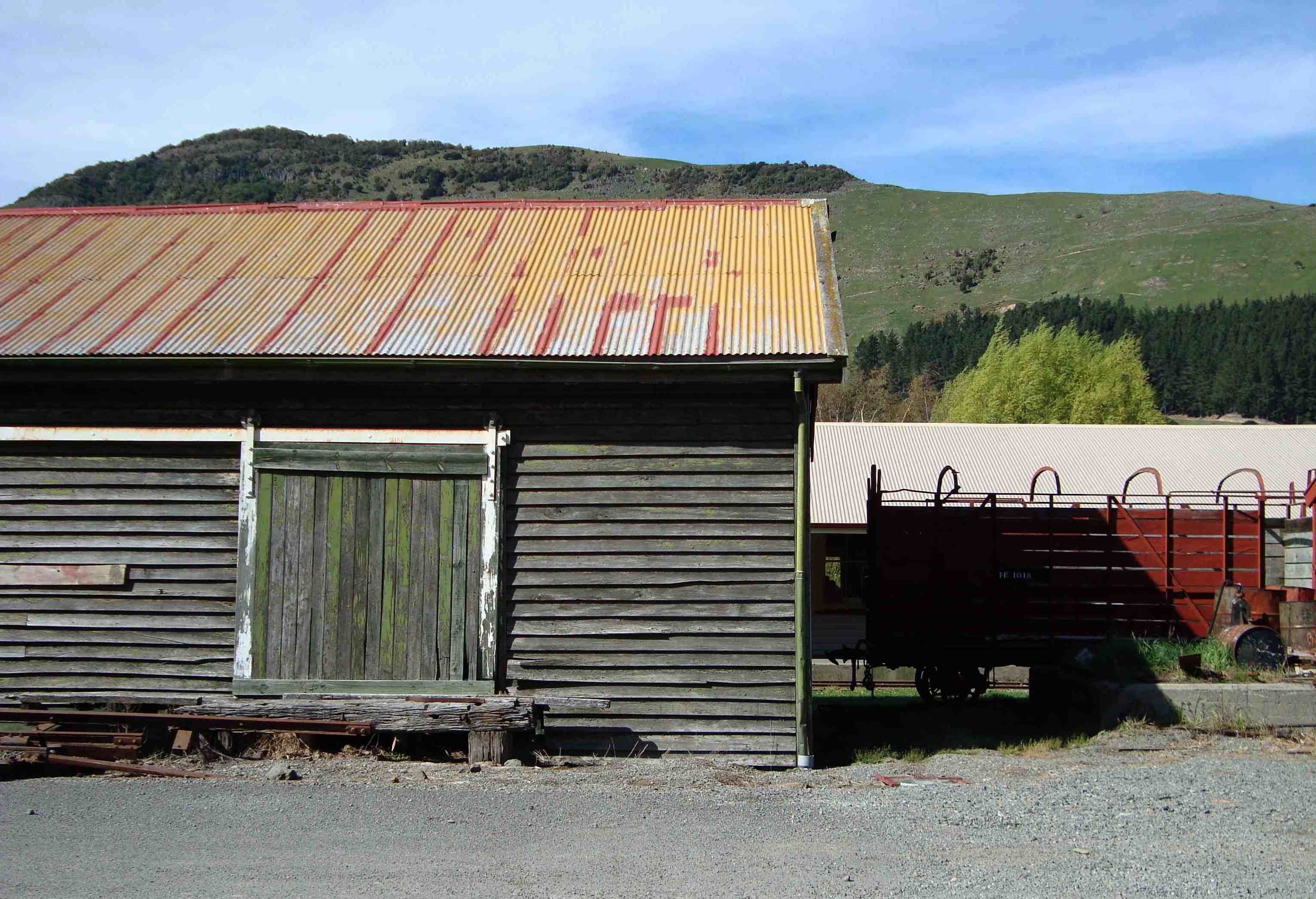
Goods shed, loading bank, and Hc Class cattle wagon.

=== Middleton ===
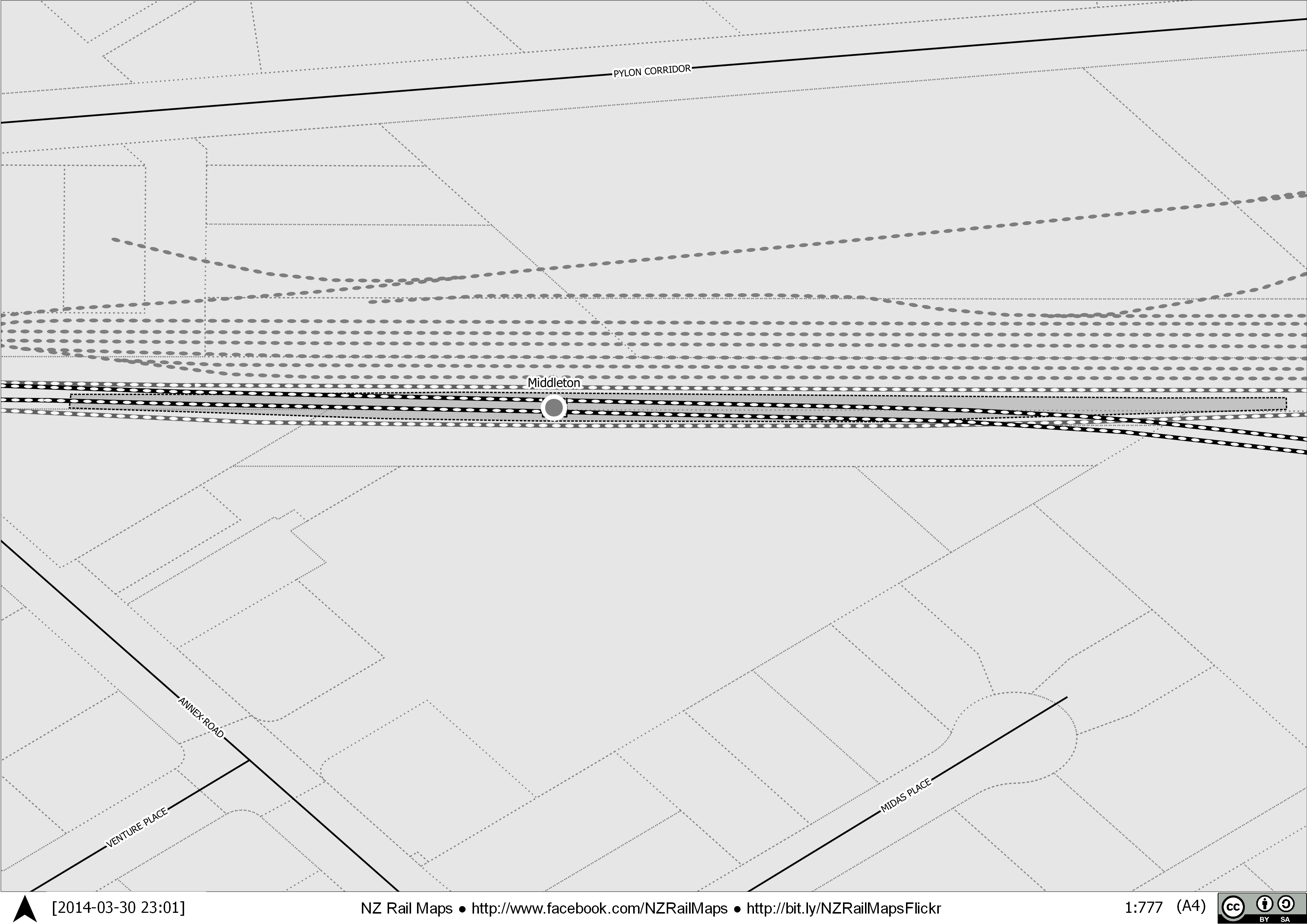
Map of Middleton

The Middleton Marshalling Yard in Christchurch on the Christchurch-Ashburton Line had a hump for shunting, and was opened on 5 December 1927. It closed in September 1930, then reopened in November 1946. Later it closed on 13 October 1986 for local loading and deliveries and fully closed on 22 October 1998.

=== Opawa ===
This station served passenger trains for residents of the suburb of Opawa. Nothing of the station remains.

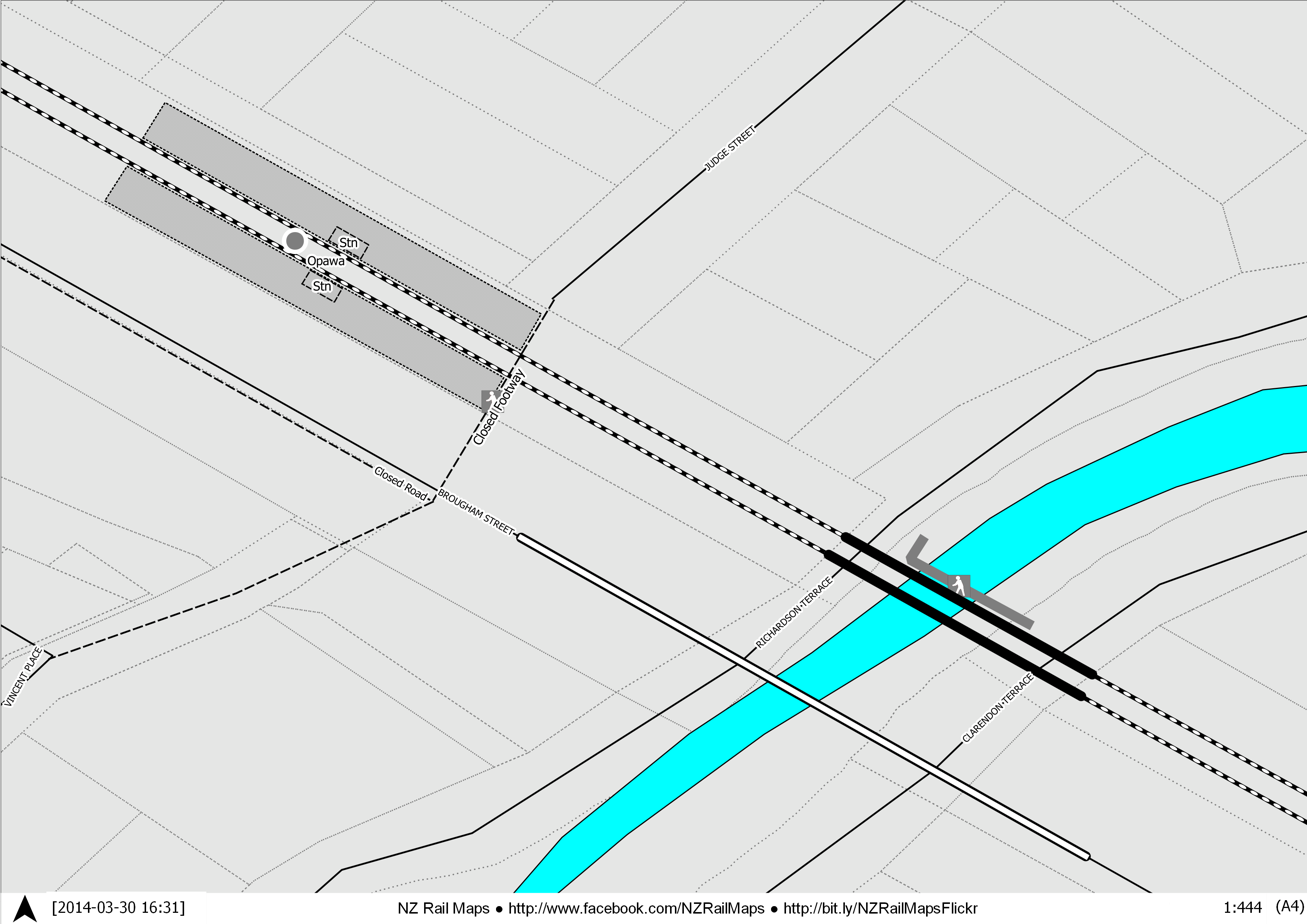
Map of Opawa

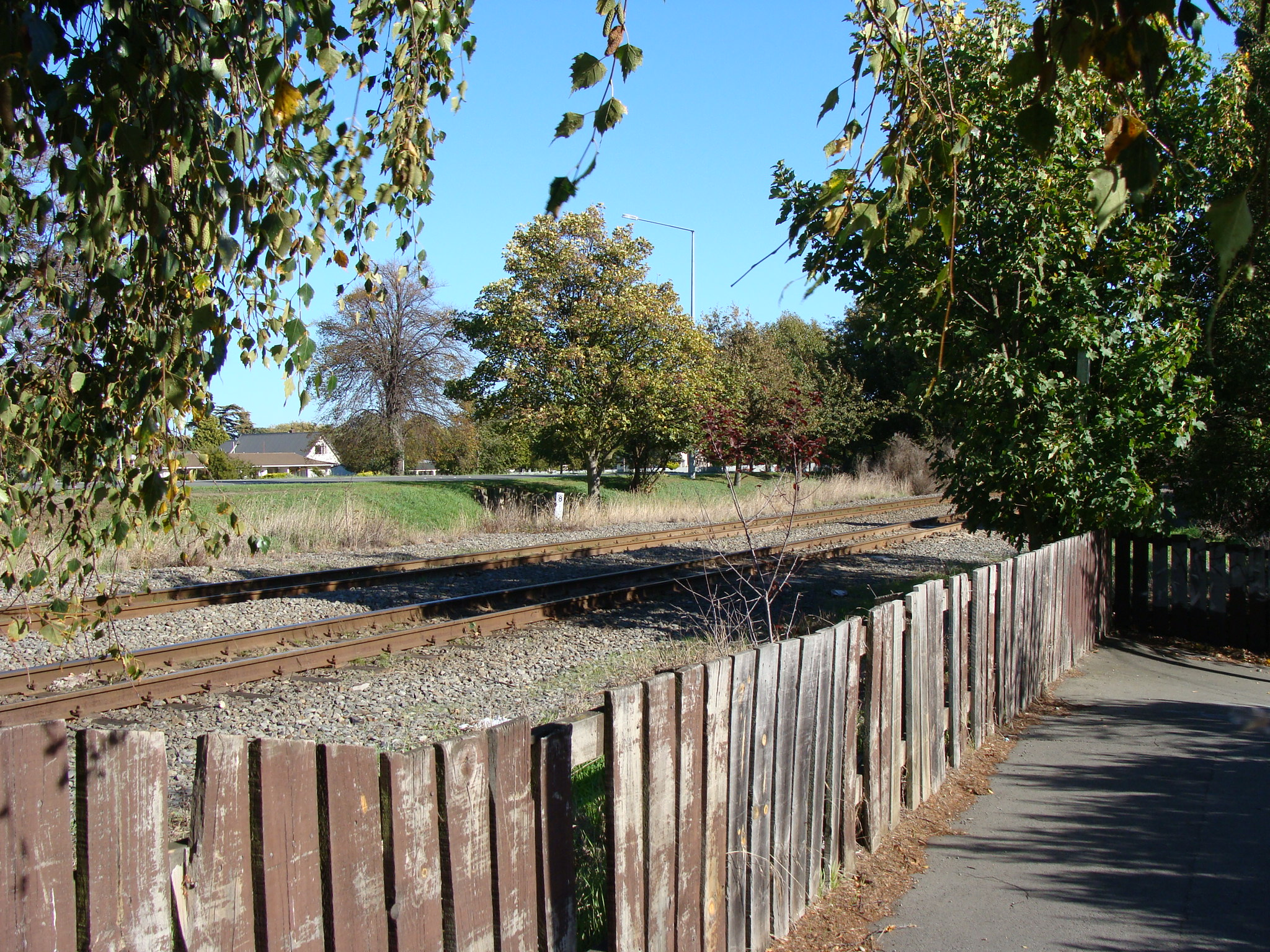
Opawa railway station site, from the Richardson Terrace - Judge Street walkway.

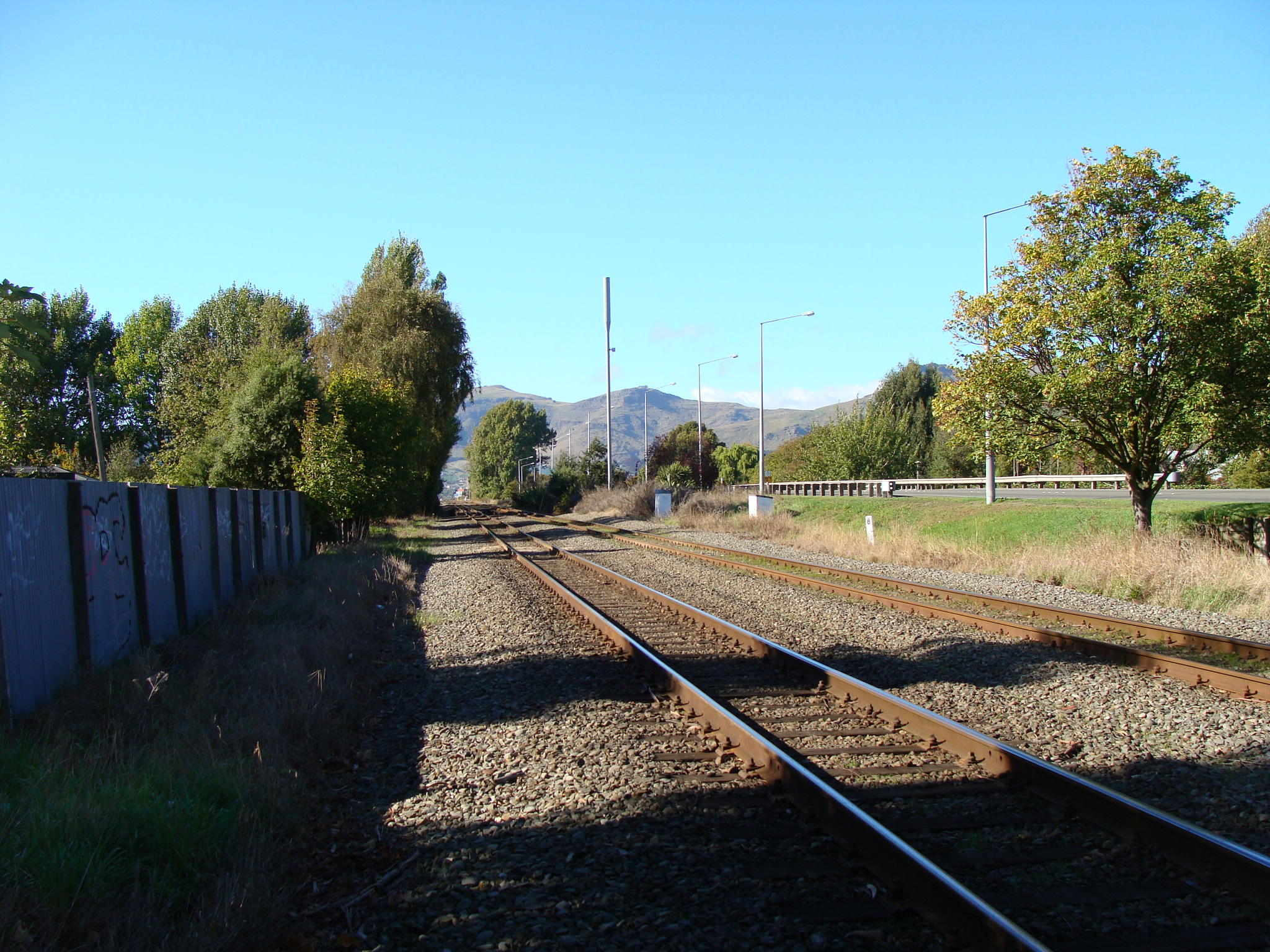
Opawa railway station site, looking south towards Woolston.

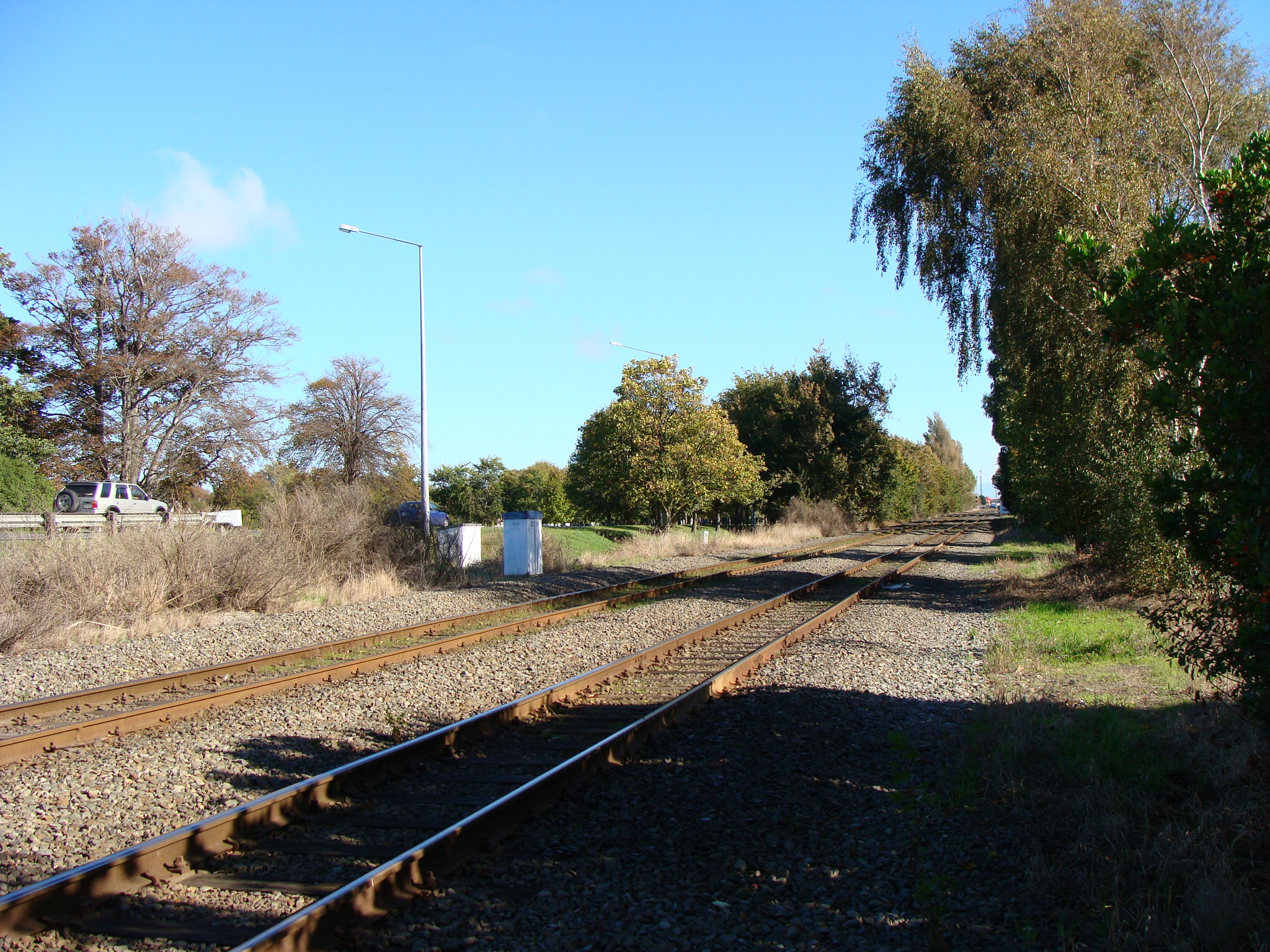
Opawa railway station site, looking north towards Linwood.

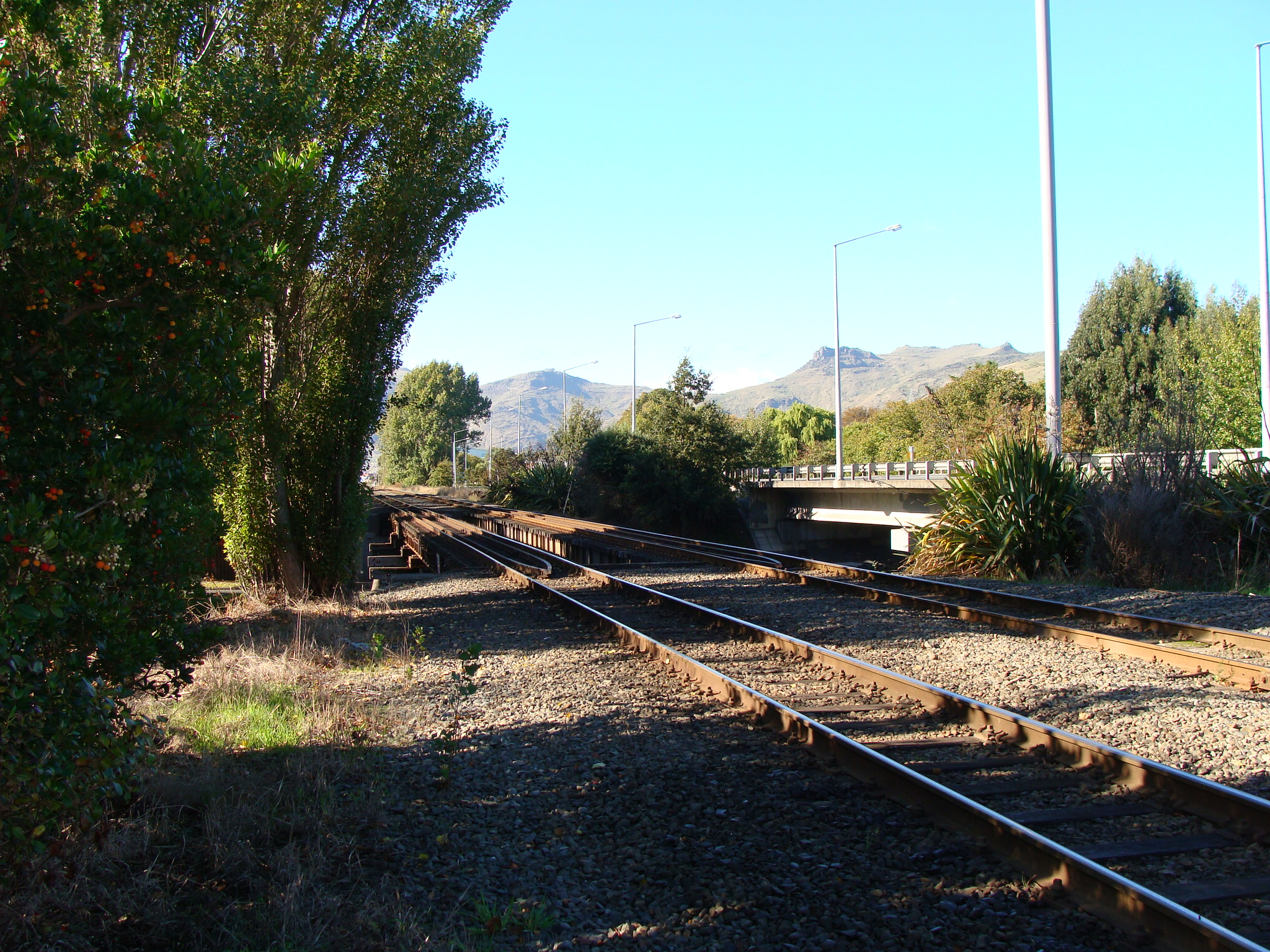
Heathcote River rail bridge, just south of the Opawa railway station site.

=== Stewarts Gully ===
This station served the settlement of Stewarts Gully on the south bank of the Waimakariri River, just south of Kaiapoi. The dates of operation of the station are not known at the time of writing, but the Main North Line in the area opened on 29 April 1872, and closed on 31 August 1958 when the Waimakariri River Bridge was replaced with a new structure and associated trackage 1.6 km upstream.

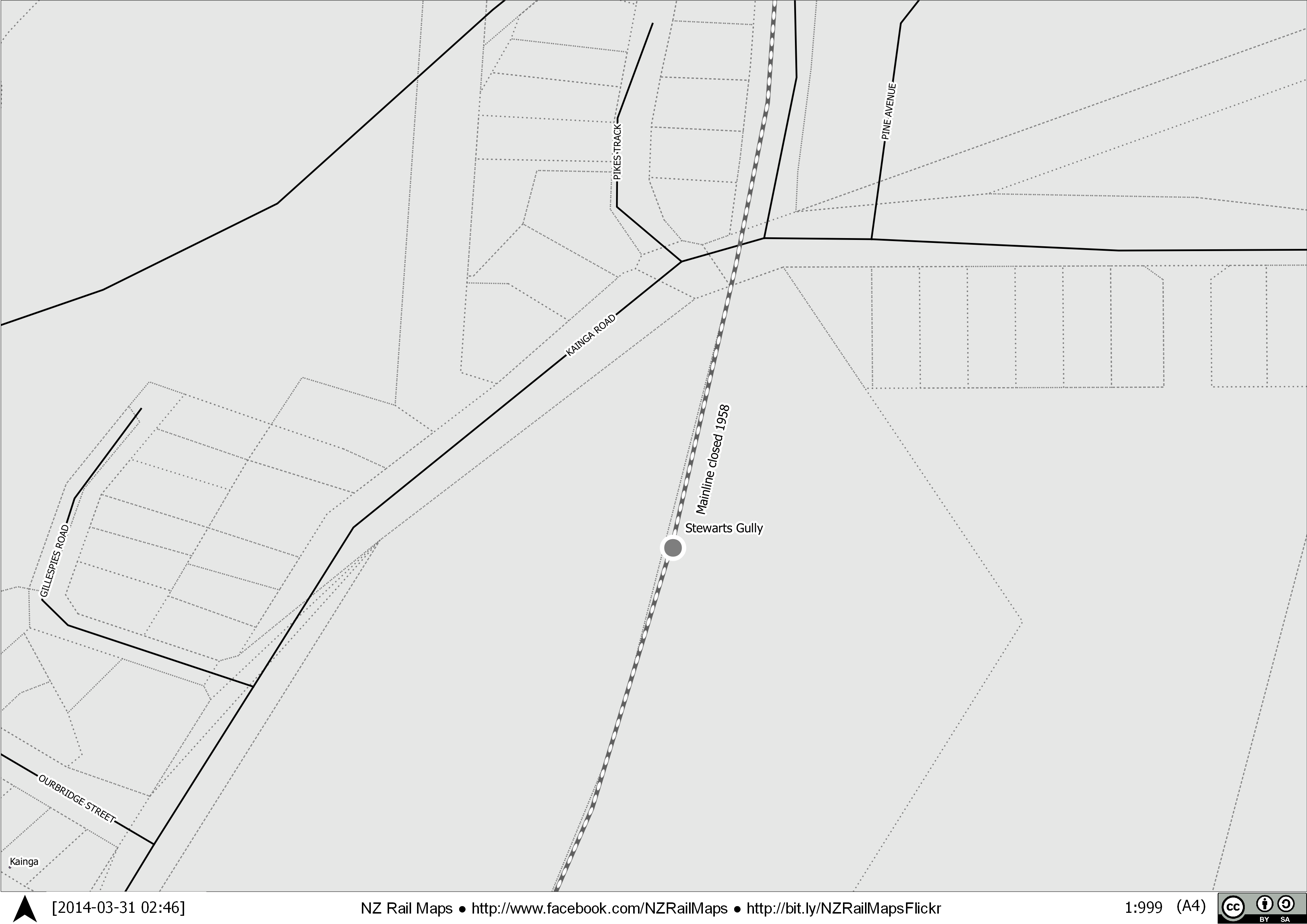
Map of Stewarts Gully

=== Templeton ===
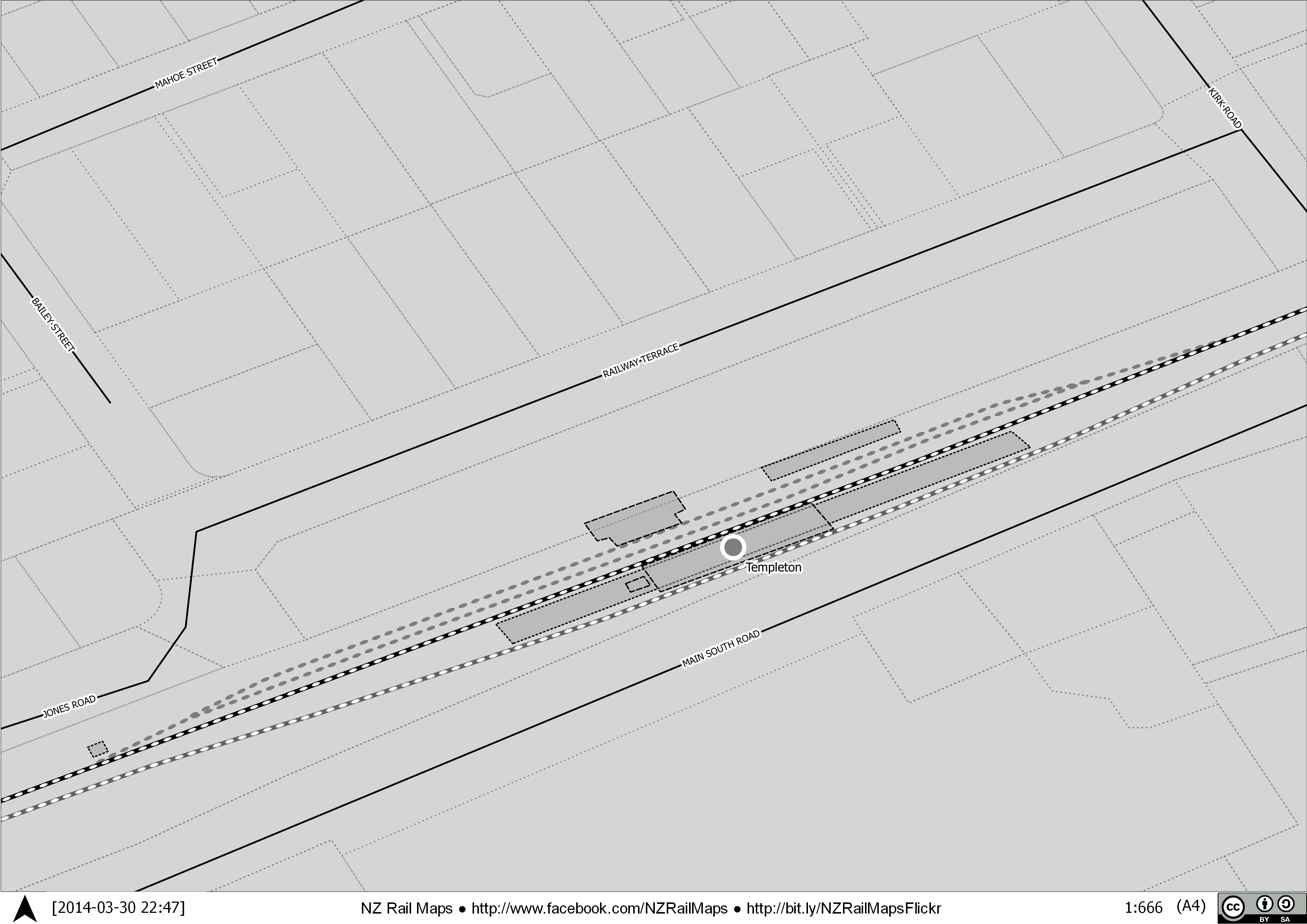
Map of Templeton

=== Woolston ===
Formerly known as Hillsborough after another nearby suburb, this station continues to serve as a freight hub for several adjacent industrial customers. The platform and loading bank remain, though the station building has been demolished.

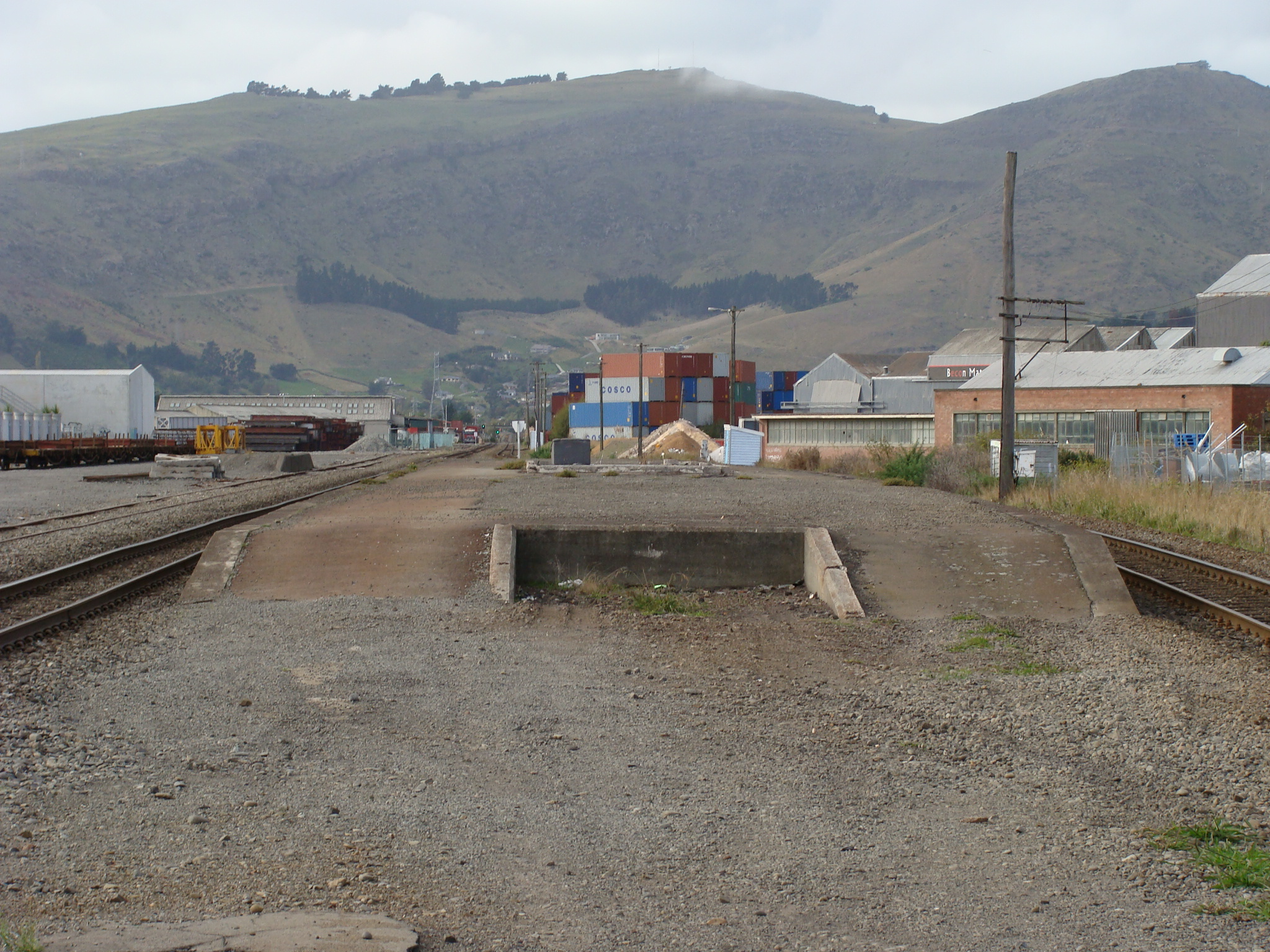
View along the Woolston Railway Station platform.

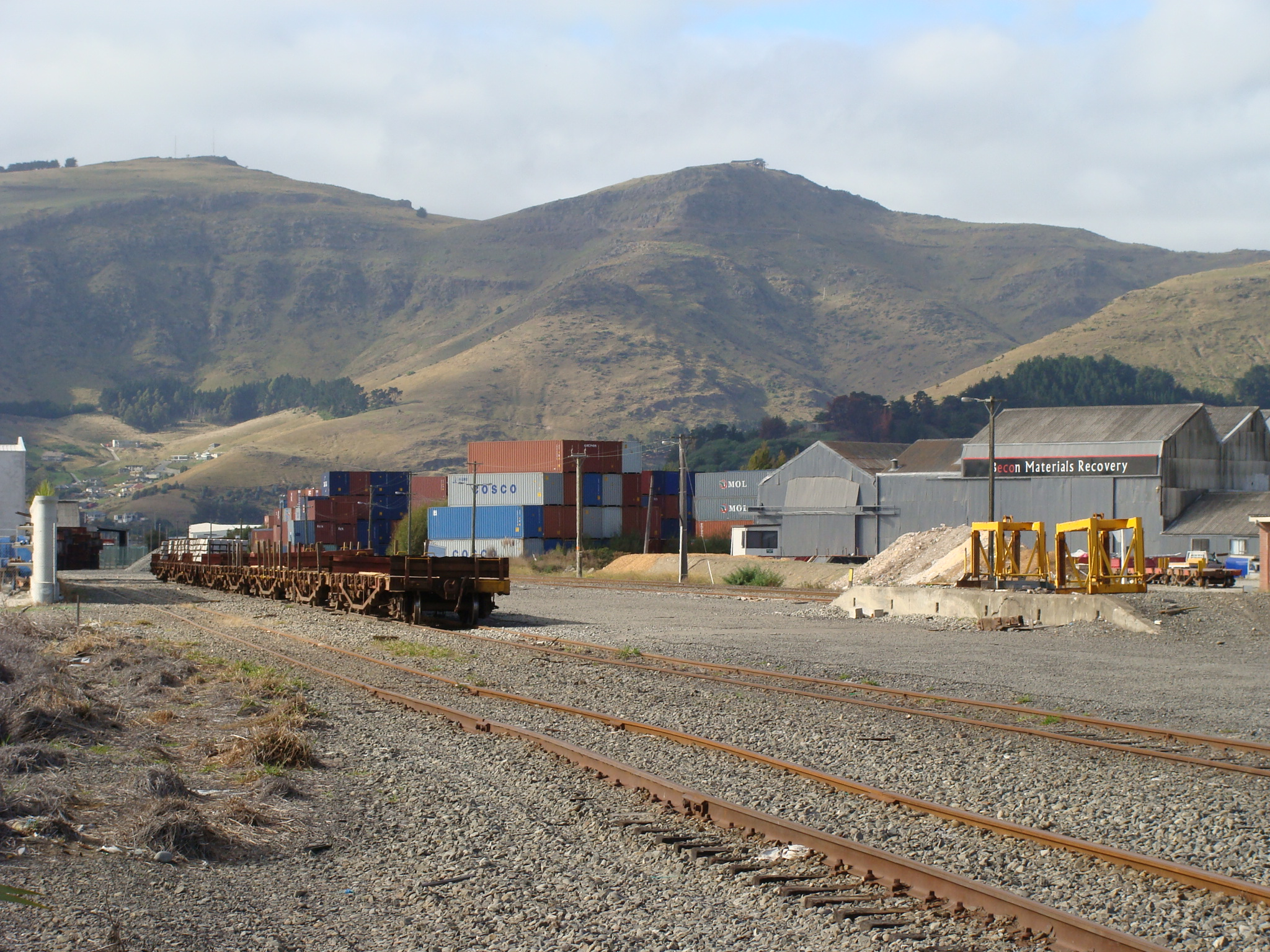
Woolston Railway Station: wagon sidings, foreground; container storage yard, background; loading bank, right.

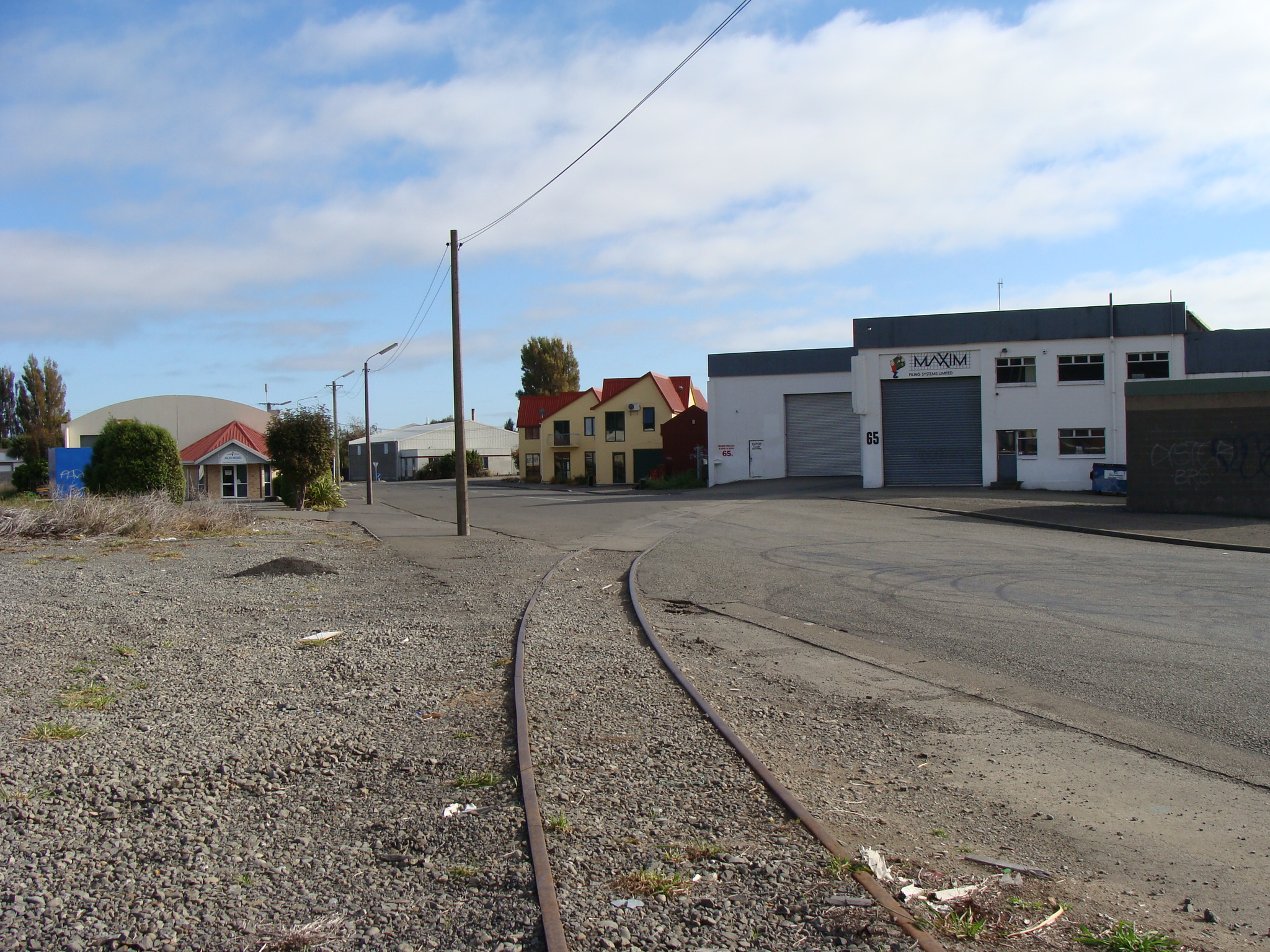
Disused private siding across Maunsell Street from the Woolston Railway Station yard.

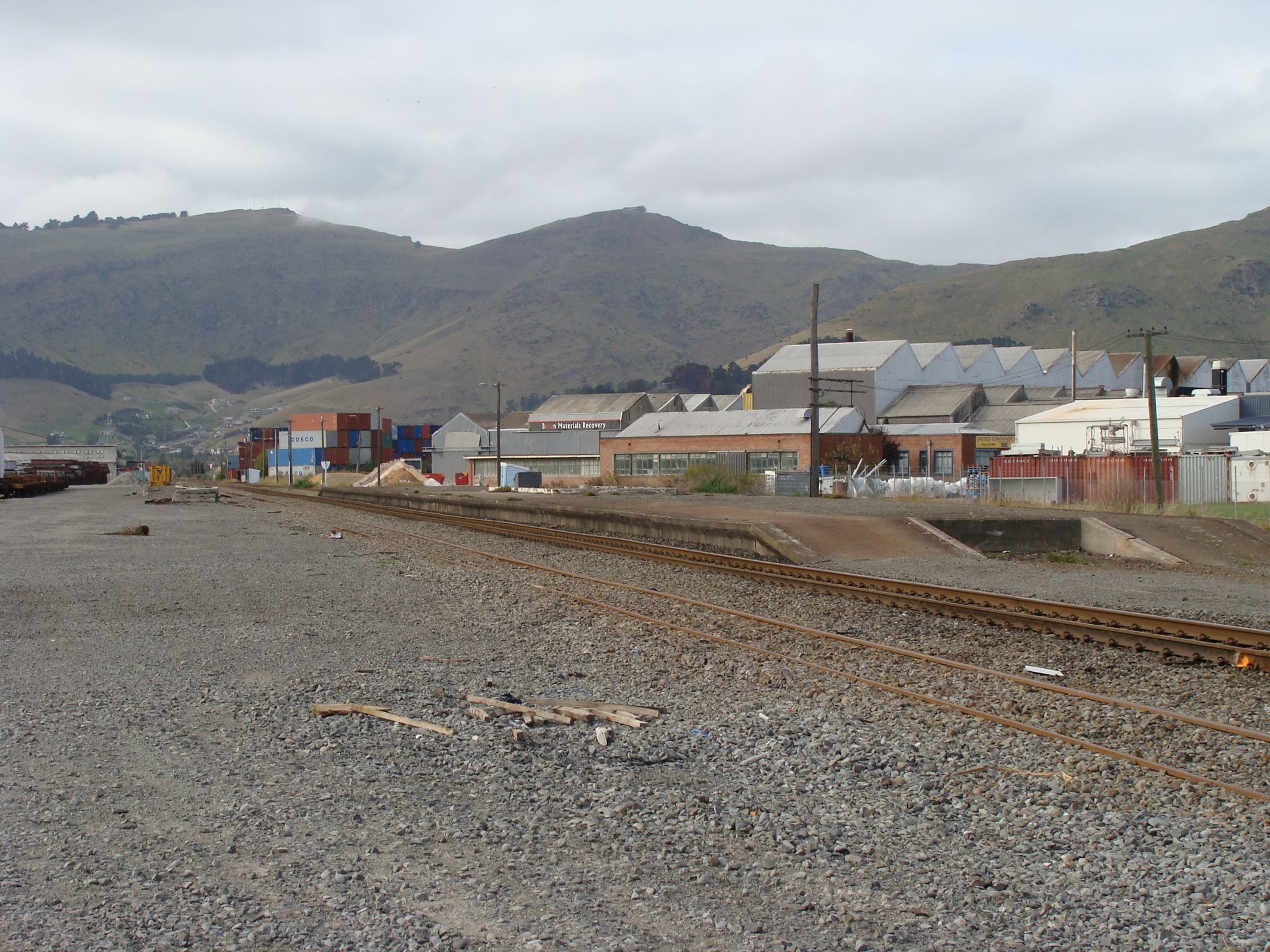
View from the side of the Woolston Railway Station platform.

== See also ==
- Rail transport in New Zealand
- Rail transport in Christchurch

== Notes and references ==
=== References ===
- Quail Map Company (1993). New Zealand Railway and Tramway Atlas (4th ed.). England: The Quail Map Company. ISBN 0-900609-92-3.
- Bromby, Robin (2003). Rails That Built A Nation: An Encyclopedia of New Zealand Railways. Wellington: Grantham House Publishing. ISBN 1-86934-080-9.
- Churchman, Geoffrey B; Hurst, Tony (2001) [1990, 1991]. The Railways of New Zealand: A Journey through History (Second ed.). Transpress New Zealand. ISBN 0-908876-20-3.
- McQueen, Euan (2005). Rails In The Hinterland: New Zealand’s Vanishing Railway Landscape. Wellington: Grantham House Publishing. ISBN 1-86934-094-9.
- Pierre, W. A. (1964). Canterbury Provincial Railways: Genesis of the N.Z.R. System. Wellington: The New Zealand Railway and Locomotive Society.
- Rail Heritage Trust of New Zealand

== Bibliography ==
- Churchman, Geoffrey B.; Hurst, Tony (2001) [1990]. The Railways of New Zealand: A journey through history (second ed.). Wellington: Transpress New Zealand. ISBN 0-908876-20-3.
- Churchman, Geoffrey B.; Hurst, Tony (1992). South Island Main Trunk. Wellington: IPL Books. ISBN 0-908876-78-5.
- Mahoney, J. D. (1987). Down at the Station: A study of the New Zealand Railway Station. Palmerston North: The Dunmore Press. ISBN 0-86469-060-6.
