= M class =

M class or M-class may refer to:

== Military ==
- M-class blimp, an American WW2 class of anti-submarine warfare airships
- M-class cruiser, a planned German light cruiser class
- M-class destroyer, several classes of destroyer
  - Admiralty M-class destroyer, a class of British destroyers built 1913–1916 and served in World War I
  - M-class, British destroyers starting with the letter M of the L and M-class destroyer, launched 1939–1942 and served in World War II
  - Marcílio Dias-class destroyer, Brazilian destroyers built during World War II
- Karel Doorman-class frigate, of the Royal Netherlands Navy
- M-class minesweeper, several classes of minesweeper
  - M-class minesweeper (Germany), a class of minesweepers of the World War II German Kriegsmarine
  - M-class minesweeper (Netherlands), a class of minesweepers of the Royal Netherlands Navy built after World War I
- Abercrombie-class monitor, a British WWI class of monitor gunships
- M-class submarine, several classes of submarine
  - British M-class submarine
  - United States M-class submarine

== Transportation ==
- Mercedes-Benz M-Class, an automobile
- M-segment, a European vehicle size class
- NBR M Class 4-4-0, steam locomotives
- NZR M class locomotives
- Pennsylvania Railroad class M1, locomotives
- South Australian Railways M class (first), 0-4-2 steam locomotives
- South Australian Railways M class (second), 2-4-2T steam locomotives
- Tasmanian Government Railways M class (1912), 4-4-2+2-4-4 steam locomotives
- Tasmanian Government Railways M class (1952), 4-6-2 steam locomotives
- Victorian Railways M class, steam locomotives
- Victorian Railways M class (diesel-hydraulic), shunting locomotives
- WAGR M class, 2-6-0+0-6-2 steam locomotives
- WAGR M class (1875), 2-6-0 steam locomotives
- WAGR M class (diesel), diesel-hydraulic locomotives
- OOCL M-class container ship, a class of large container ships operated by Orient Overseas Container Line
- Maersk M-class container ship, a class of large container ships operated by Maersk Line
- M-class Melbourne tram
- M-class Sydney tram

== Astronomy ==
- M class, a stellar classification
- M class, a class of solar flare

== See also ==
- Class M (disambiguation)
- M type (disambiguation)
