= Lyttelton railway station =

Railway station in New Zealand

Lyttelton
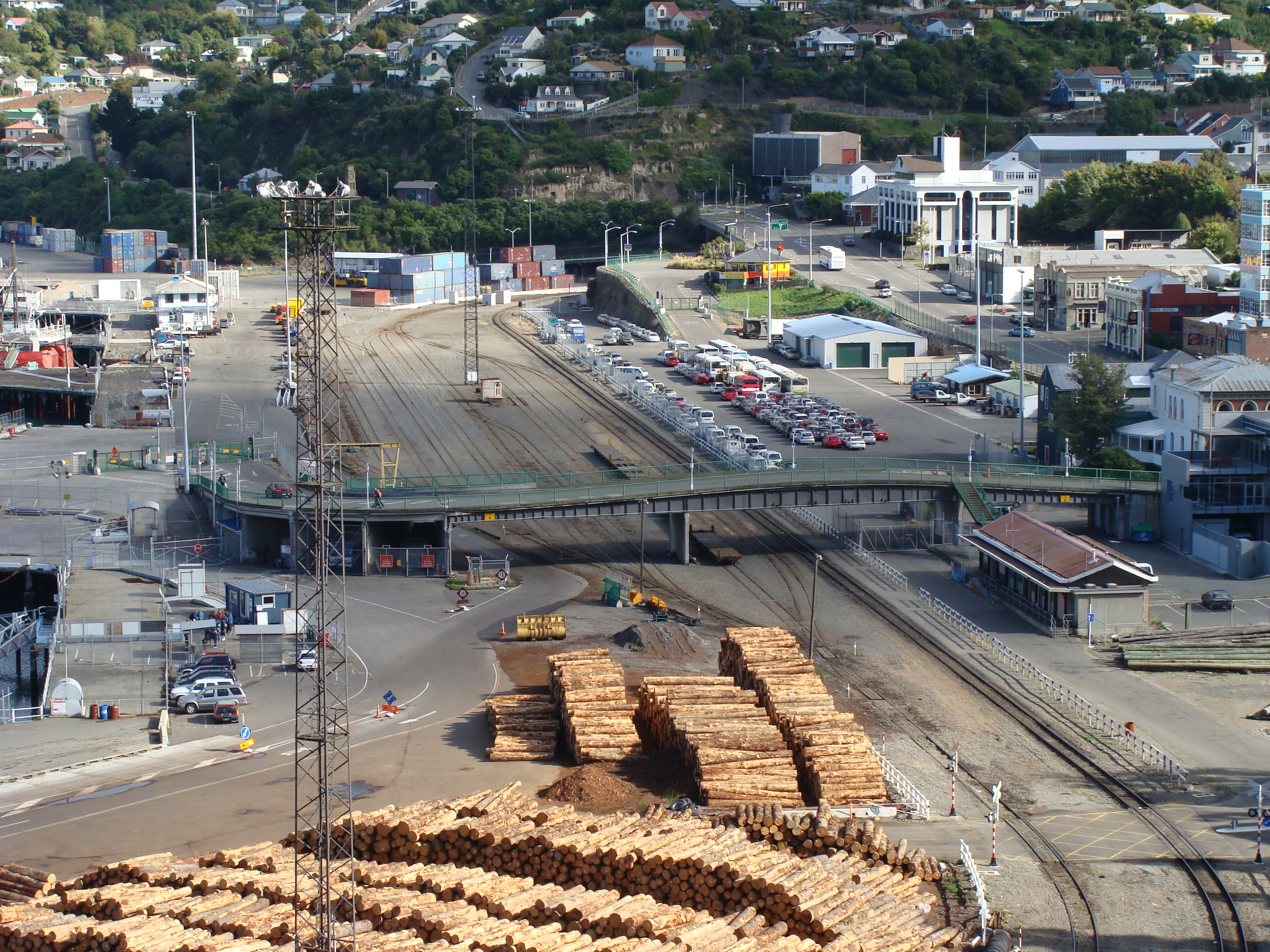

General information
- Location: Norwich Quay, Lyttelton, New Zealand
- Coordinates: 43°36′14.51″S 172°43′8.75″E (first); 43°36′16.32″S 172°43′19.09″E (second); 43°36′16.64″S 172°43′20.49″E (third)
- System: New Zealand Government Railways (NZGR) suburban rail
- Owner: KiwiRail
- Line: Lyttelton Line
- Platforms: Single side (truncated) and dock (removed)
- Tracks: Main line (1)
- Connections: Metro bus routes 28 and 35; Diamond Harbour ferry Steamer Express inter-island ferry (discontinued)

Construction
- Parking: Yes
- Cycle facilities: No

History
- Opened: 9 December 1867 (first); 21 December 1877 (second); 14 October 1963 (third)
- Closed: 20 December 1877 (first); 13 October 1963 (second)
- Electrified: 14 February 1929 – 18 September 1970

Services
Preceding station	Historical railways	Following station
Heathcote; Line open station closed	Lyttelton Line; NZR	Terminus
Location
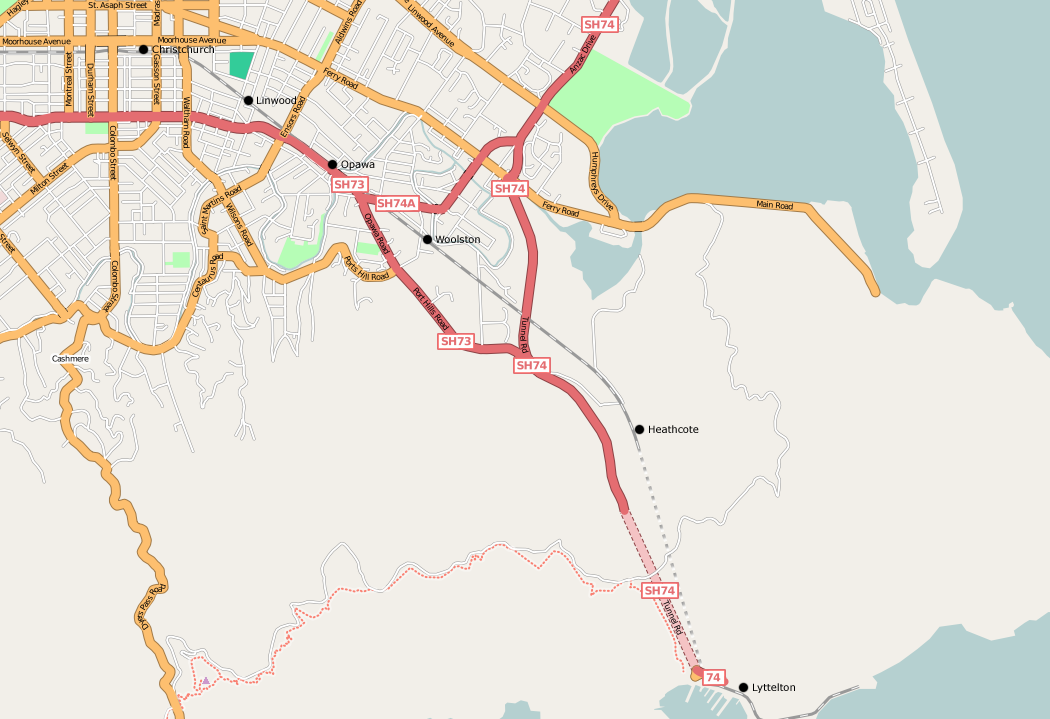

Lyttelton railway station is the northern terminus of the Main South Line, a main trunk railway line from Lyttelton to Invercargill in the South Island of New Zealand. There have been three stations built at Lyttelton, with the most recent of these still being used for railway purposes.

Both freight and passenger services have featured at Lyttelton since it opened in 1867. With the cessation of suburban passenger trains to Lyttelton in the 1970s, freight became the mainstay of railway business at Lyttelton and passenger traffic from Lyttelton now plays only a minor role. Tranz Scenic have run a limited tourist service from the station during the summer season in recent years, though patronage of the trains is limited to cruise ship passengers. Proposals have been made to reinstate a commuter rail service from Lyttelton, but that is not considered to be a realistic possibility for the foreseeable future. Rail operations at Lyttelton have included all three forms of motive power, with steam being dominant until the late 1960s, after which diesel began to take over, with electric power being used from 1929 to 1970. All trains at Lyttelton are now diesel-hauled.

Public transport connections at Lyttelton include Metro bus routes 28 and 35 (for which the nearest bus stop is a short distance down Norwich Quay from the station), and the Diamond Harbour ferry, which departs from a jetty opposite the station. Until they were discontinued in 1976, the Steamer Express inter-island ferries connected with passenger trains at Lyttelton on wharf no. 2 (opposite the station). Other nearby amenities include Lyttelton Main School, a medical clinic, several hotels, and the Lyttelton central business district.

== History ==
=== Facilities ===
==== First station (1867–1873) ====
On 16 April 1861, Canterbury Superintendent, William Moorhouse, engaged the services of Melbourne-based contractors Holmes & Co. to construct the Lyttelton rail tunnel. The contract did not cover the erection of stations, but they, including the station at Lyttelton, were also built by the contractor at cost plus a margin of 15%. Work on the contract commenced later that year.

The original plan for the Lyttelton station, as suggested in 1864 by Provincial Engineer Edward Dobson, was to have the track terminate at a station on a jetty in line with the rail tunnel, as was subsequently done at Port Chalmers in Dunedin. The following year, the provincial executive decided instead to locate the station in front of the town. That necessitated the reclamation of land for the station and yard, using fill extracted from the bore of the tunnel . Plans for the station included an export shed, goods shed, offices, and a platform.

The station opened on 9 December 1867, coinciding with the official opening of the tunnel. The arrival of the first train was viewed by a crowd of around 500 people. Some of the first passengers commented that the station was not finished, even appearing temporary in nature.

The station building was a small wooden structure with a gabled roof, with dimensions of 16 by 35 feet (4.9 by 10.7 m). Trains were worked to the sides of ships for the transfer of cargo by means of wagon turntables, because the tracks in the station yard were at right angles to the wharves. Access to the goods shed was provided by means of a traverser.

==== Second station (1873–1963) ====
Plans for the second station were drawn up in January 1873. John Marshman, General Manager of the Canterbury Provincial Railways, successfully convinced the provincial government to erect verandas over the station platforms arguing that "... I do not remember seeing anywhere a railway station of the dimensions and importance of that at Lyttelton where people were sent out of doors in all weathers to reach the carriages". The station was brought into service on completion in August 1873.

With several alterations and additions, that station served Lyttelton for 90 years, until replaced by a modern structure in 1963. The station offices were at right angles to the passenger platforms, originally on the western side of Oxford Street, but moved to the other side of that street in about 1882. The platform was lengthened in 1903 to accommodate an additional two carriages, necessitating the relocation of the lamp room to a position near the engine shed. The railway stores shed was destroyed by fire, presumed to be arson, on 6 November 1937. Following the removal of a siding to Kinsey & Company's store near the station, a 50-foot (15 m) extension of the platform at the west end was authorised in 1950, because of difficulties in placing mixed consists (a common practice at the time) at the platform.

The many decades of service provided by that station necessitated several significant repairs or renovations during its existence. In 1910, the District Engineer wrote to the Chief Engineer to point out the many defects that had developed, and expressed his preference for the erection of a new station. That was not accepted, and he was directed to make whatever repairs were necessary to the existing structure. A report from the District Engineer in 1935 noted that several buildings at Lyttelton, dating from 1882, were irreparably infested with borer. By the 1950s, years of deferred maintenance had led to the station buildings becoming dilapidated. Despite that, it was not until the late 1950s that a decision was finally made to replace the station.

==== Proposed station (1920s) ====
By the time electrification became a serious proposition for Christchurch in the 1920s, the Lyttelton station was showing its age. Because upgrading the line between Christchurch and Lyttelton was a major undertaking, it was proposed that it would be an opportune time to replace the Lyttelton station with a new facility. It was also around that time that plans were being prepared for a new station at Christchurch, and the idea was to build a new station for Lyttelton at the same time.

The Minister of Railways, Gordon Coates, included the construction of a new station at Lyttelton in the programme of works for 1924. Though plans for the station were completed in 1927 and promises made by the Railways Department to build it after the electrification of the Lyttelton rail tunnel, there was no progress. In 1928, the stationmaster noted that the construction of a new station at Lyttelton had been indefinitely postponed, and he arranged for the station buildings to be painted instead.

The matter of a new station was again raised in the mid-1930s, by which time the facilities at Lyttelton had continued to deteriorate. On 10 August 1936, the same year that plans for the new Christchurch station were approved, the Minister of Railways, Dan Sullivan, said that "the matter is receiving consideration at present, but the request has to be considered in the light of requests for stations in other places where there are also very good claims." He claimed that Lyttelton could expect a new station, but he could not say when that would happen. Early the following year, when the stationmaster asked to be consulted about the plans for the new station, he was informed by the District Traffic Manager that there were no proposals, of even a tentative nature, for a new station at Lyttelton. The station was finally painted in 1940 following concerns expressed by the local council about its appearance, a move that was regarded as evidence that the Railways Department had shelved plans to build a new station.

==== Third station and yard (1963 – present) ====
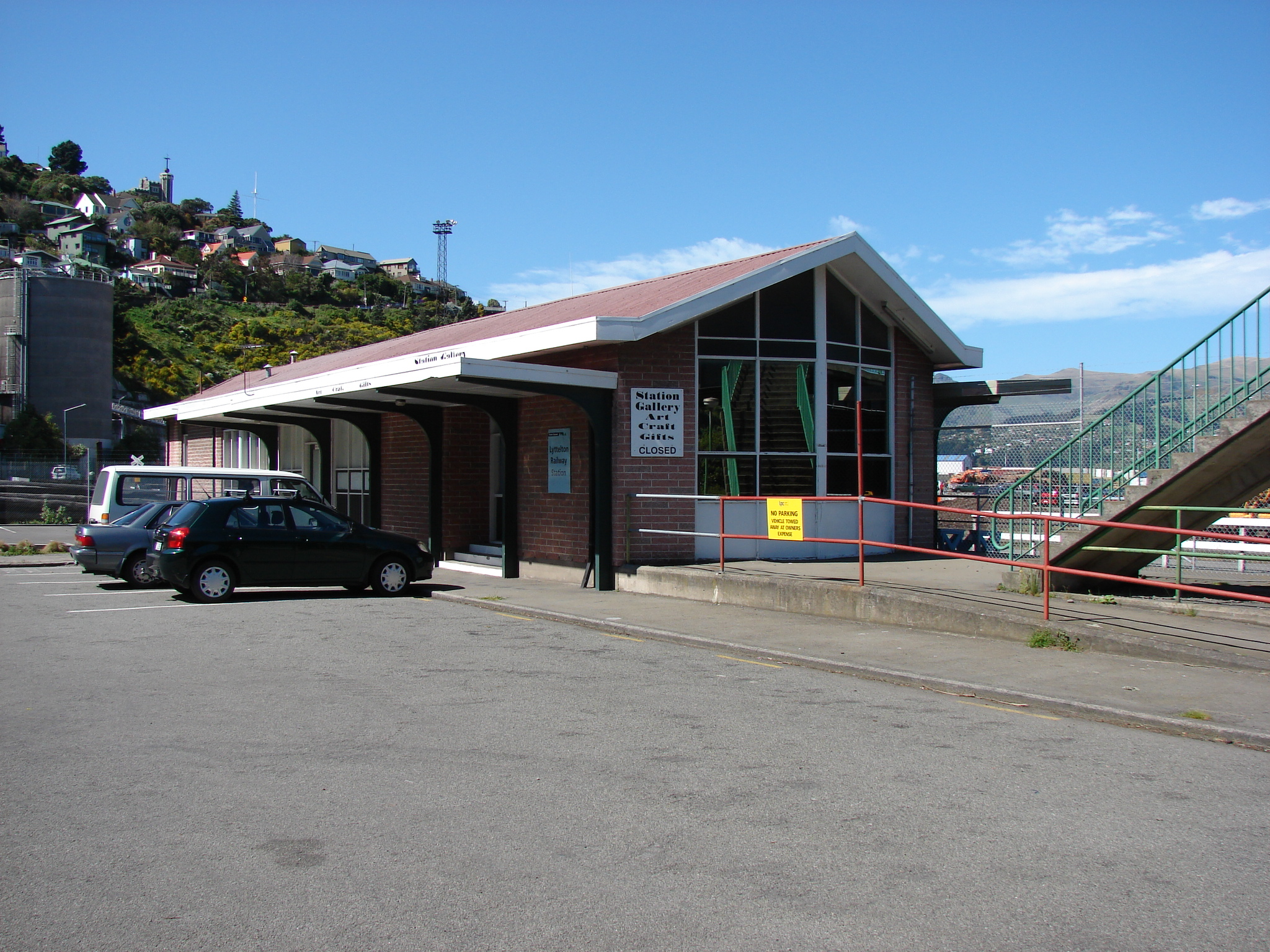
Lyttelton station building.

The Chief Civil Engineer wrote to the District Engineer on 5 July 1957 to inform him that Lyttelton was next in line for a station upgrade. A survey of the existing building was requested so that Working Estimates for the project could be prepared. After considering the many faults in the building highlighted by that survey, the Chief Civil Engineer confirmed in writing to the District Engineer on 12 February 1959 that it had been decided to replace the station building rather than try to renovate it. He therefore requested that the requirements of the staff based at Lyttelton be determined, and that plans be prepared for a suitable new structure.

Even before the third station opened, there were doubts about the long-term viability of passenger rail services between Lyttelton and Christchurch. The Lyttelton road tunnel was soon to become a reality, providing a much more convenient road link between Lyttelton Harbour and the Canterbury Plains. It was expected to make road transport a serious competitor to the railways for the custom of passengers, and concerns were expressed that a new station for Lyttelton could not be justified. Despite that, the Minister of Railways, John McAlpine, announced on 7 August 1962 that the Cabinet had approved a redevelopment of the railway facilities at Lyttelton.

As part of the station redevelopment, the functions of the Goods Office were moved to the former Harbour Board building, on the corner of Oxford Street and Norwich Quay. That building was also to house the station master, the railway port superintendent and the goods supervisor, as well as their respective support staff. Renovation of the building for its new function was underway in September 1962, and was expected to be completed by the end of the year. Following completion of the renovations, and the relocation of the goods office, the old Goods Office building was scheduled for demolition. The demolition was delayed while the power supply for the station was re-routed, because it had fed through the Goods Office building. The land formerly occupied by that building was reallocated for use as a car park.

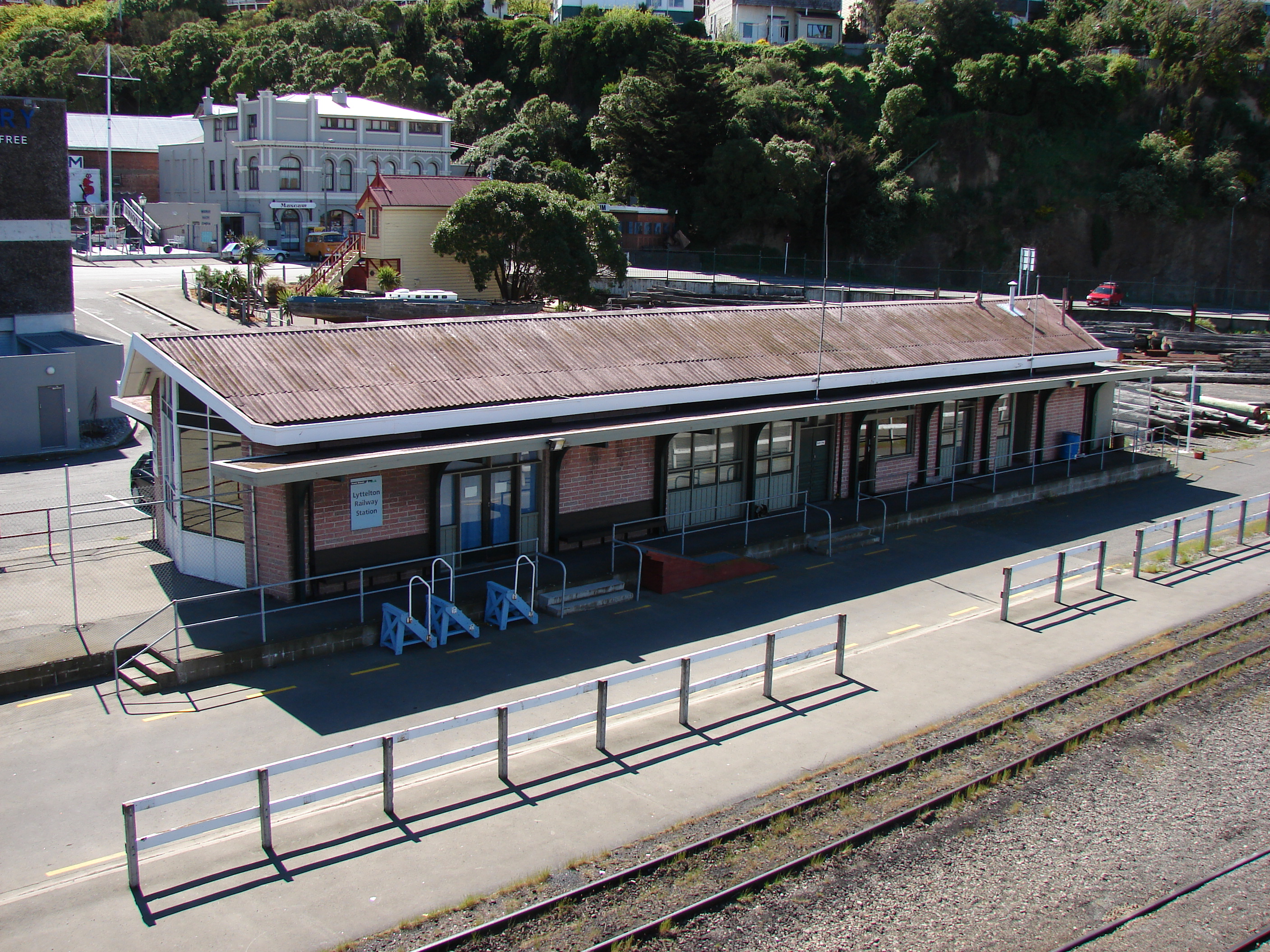
Lyttelton station building.

Once work on the Goods Office was completed, construction of the new station commenced in January 1963, next to the existing station. The old station remained in use while the new station was being built. The first section of the new station was brought into service on 10 June 1963. At that time, the old station was demolished in stages to make way for the construction of the remainder of the new station.

The official opening ceremony was held on 14 October 1963, presided over by the mayor of Lyttelton, J. B. Collett. Various other dignitaries and invited guests were present, including the Minister of Railways, John McAlpine (who officially opened the station), the local member for parliament, Norman Kirk, and the Railways general manager, A. T. Gandell. An invitation to attend was also extended to members of the public. During his speech, the mayor expressed his confidence that, despite the impending completion of the Lyttelton road tunnel, and the desire expressed by the Christchurch Transport Board to operate bus services to Lyttelton, both road and rail could coexist to meet Lyttelton's transport requirements. Two buses were provided to convey official guests to the Borough Council Chambers for morning tea.

A new goods shed at Lyttelton was completed and ready for use on 7 December 1970. Many years later, in 1988, an internal Railways Department memorandum noted that the goods shed had been closed.

In 1972. it was proposed to alter the station building to accommodate all of the salaried division staff based at Lyttelton. At the time, they were working in the old Harbour Board building, which was considered to be an unsatisfactory situation. With the reduction in traffic to Lyttelton following the cancellation of suburban passenger services, some of the facilities in the station building were no longer required, and it was suggested that the building could be better utilised to house the remaining staff.

On 30 September 1977, the District Engineer requested that the dock siding at Lyttelton station be removed because the track was in poor condition and access to the siding by trains was not possible. Several days later, the District Traffic Manager responded that the track had, in fact, been renewed, and that it was still required for the stabling of shunting locomotives and track maintenance vehicles.

The station platform was shortened in 1980, after it was reported that the curved portion of the platform, east of the station building, was causing problems with clearances. That part of the platform was determined to be surplus to requirements and its removal was requested. It had previously served both the main line and the dock siding that terminated behind the station building.

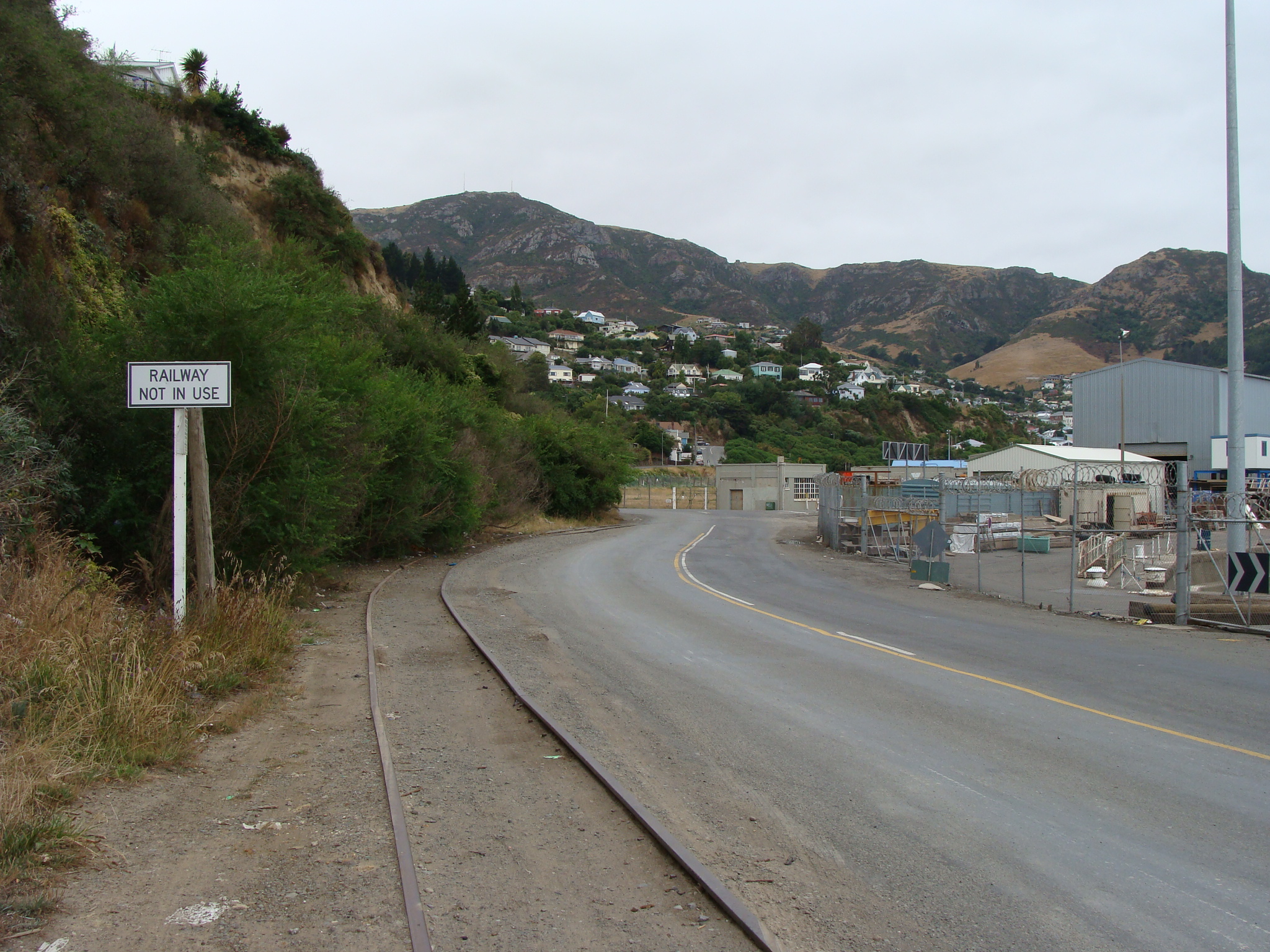
Disused Lyttelton Port main oil siding crossing Godley Quay.

==== Sidings ====
Numerous sidings have served private customers in the vicinity of Lyttelton station. None of those sidings remain in service, though the sidings that served the oil companies in the vicinity of Godley Quay, Cyrus Williams Quay, George Seymour Quay, and Charlotte Jane Quay are still in place.

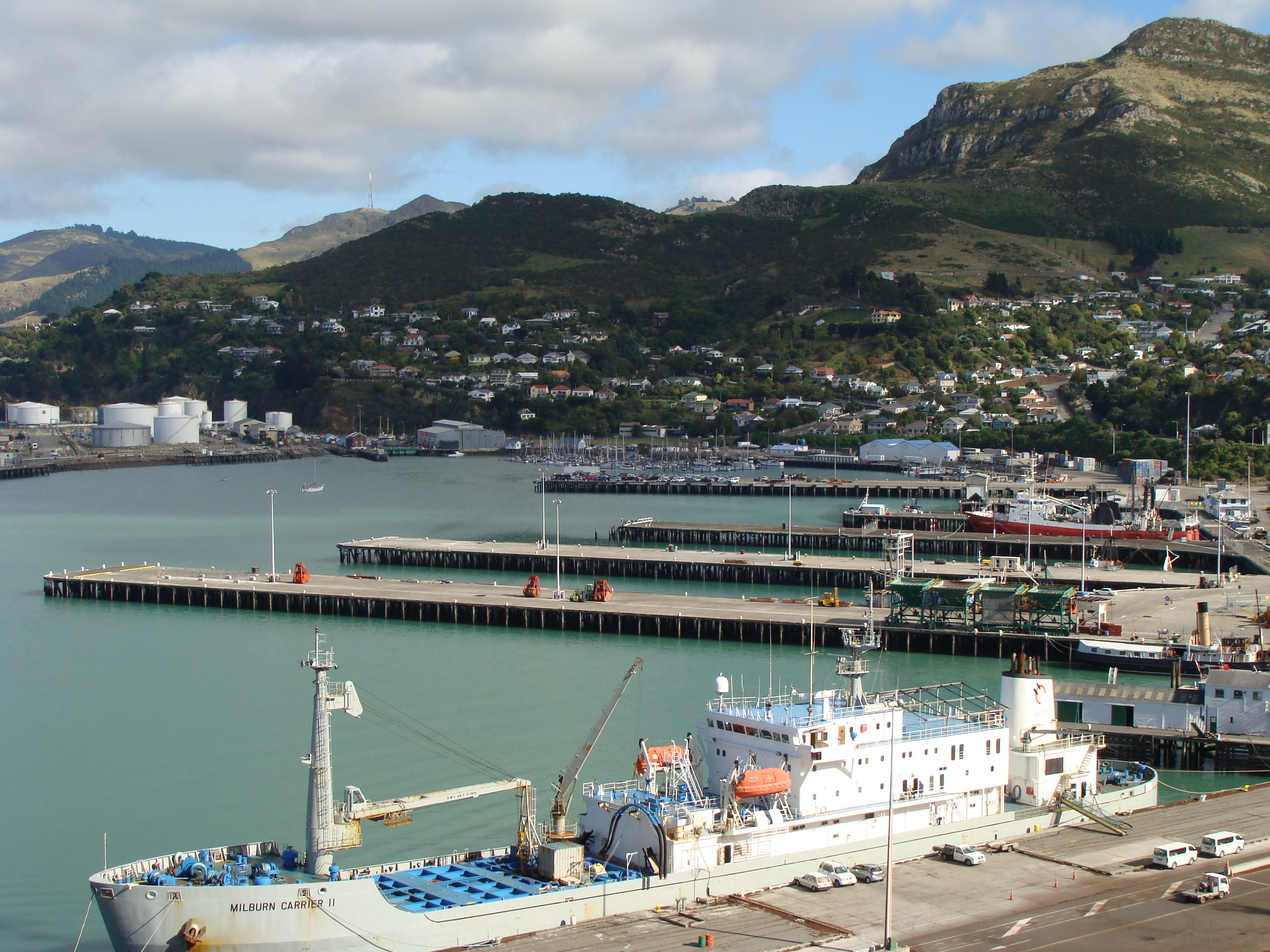
Lyttelton Port wharves 2, 3, 4, 5, 6, and 7. In the background at left is part of the oil terminal.

==== Wharves ====
The wharves of the Lyttelton port played a major part in the rail operations at Lyttelton station. All railway operations at the port were managed by the Railways Department until the mid-1970s when the port was classified as a container port and the Minister of Railways decided to phase out department operations there over the next two years. During that transitional period, responsibility for management of the wharves was transferred to the Harbour Board.

At around the time the rail connection to wharf no. 2 was removed, the Railways Department decided to also rationalise the trackwork on the waterfront and informed the Harbour Board of plans to disconnect wharves 4 and 7. The Harbour Board inspected wharf no. 4 and determined that rail access to it could continue for several more years provided repairs were made. They were also advised by the Traffic Manager that rail access to wharf no. 4 was still required, and it was therefore decided not to make any changes to that connection. However, the department decided in October to proceed with its plans for wharf no. 7 and arrangements were made with the Inspector of the Permanent Way for the work to be carried out.

Further modifications were planned to waterfront trackwork in 1982, when the department notified the Harbour Board that it intended to remove rail access to No. 1 Breastwork. On 28 August 1984, a memorandum from the Chief Civil Engineer to the District Engineer noted that wharf no. 2 had been disconnected, and that only wharves 3 and 7 retained as operable rail connections.

===== Wharf no. 2 =====
Perhaps the most well-known wharf to rail Travellers was wharf no. 2, also known as the Steamer Express Wharf, which for over 70 years served as the inter-island ferry wharf for the boat trains that terminated at Lyttelton. After 1902, passengers to and from ferries used the wharf. The ferries were operated by the Union Steam Ship Company until 1974, at which point the Ministry of Transport took over their operation until the service was cancelled in 1976.

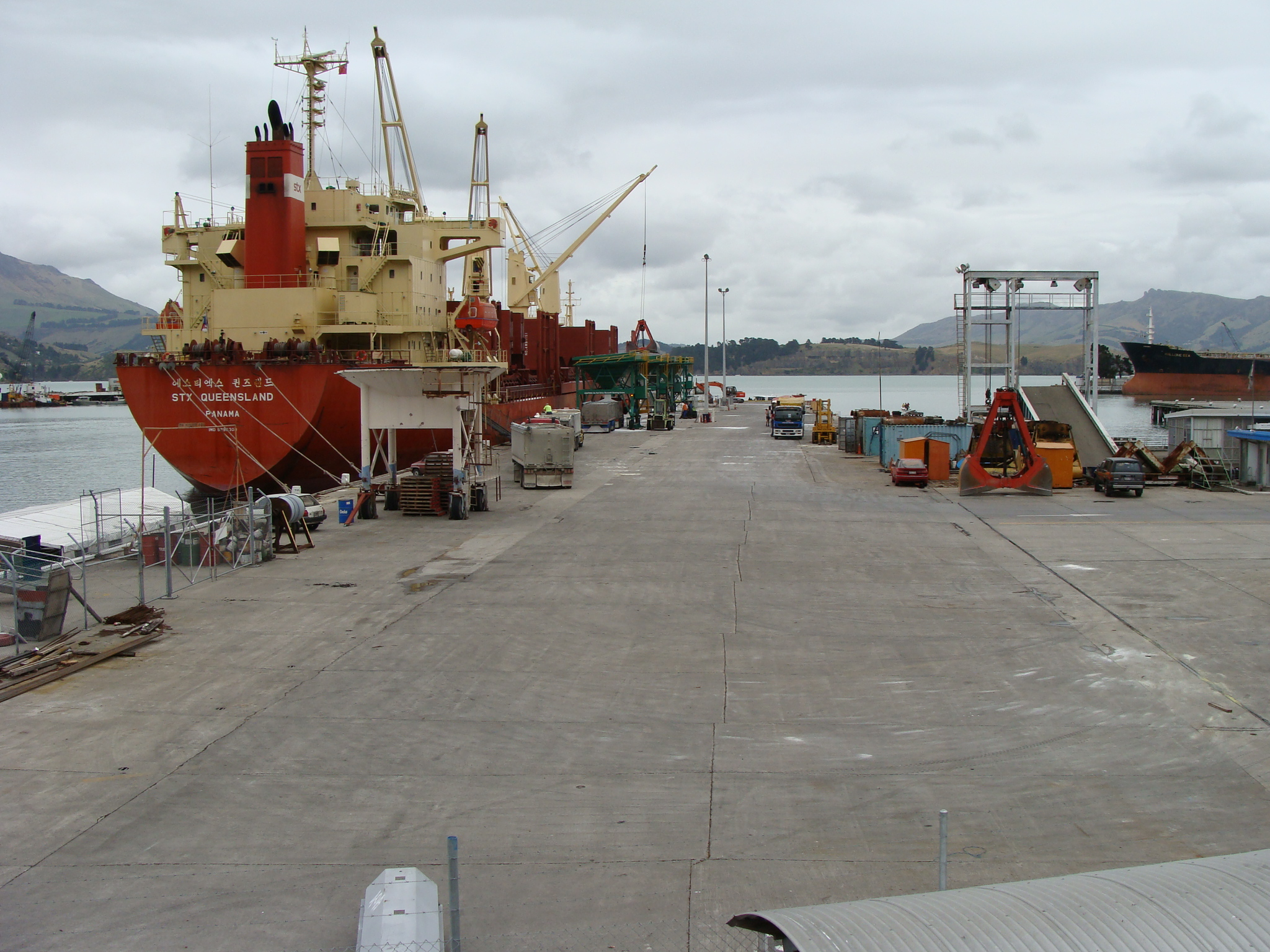
Wharf no. 2.

Several facilities were installed on the wharf in addition to the railway tracks, including a wooden platform with a veranda, which was used by passengers to board and alight from the trains, several windbreak walls, a stock race, a staircase, a gangway to board and disembark ferry passengers, a cafeteria, store room, and the main office building, which was used by both the Railways Department and the Union Company until the early 1960s, after which the Railways Department relocated to a new building. The office was extended in 1954 and used by the Railways Department during the day to sell train tickets, and by the Union Company at night to sell ferry tickets.

In February 1965, the Lyttelton Harbour Board decided to construct a new passenger terminal and vehicle loading facility on wharf no. 2 to cater for the new roll on/roll off ferries due to enter service in December that year. To facilitate the construction work, the Harbour Board arranged for the inter-island ferries to use wharf no. 3 for the remainder of the year and requested that the Railways Department-owned veranda be shortened to allow the new building to be erected.

The Harbour Board consulted with Railways Department on the design of the new facilities and requested that the department consider a contribution towards the cost of the project. The department made several suggestions, including that the board consider amending its plans to allow for a wider 13 feet (4.0 m) platform, because they considered the plan for an 8 feet (2.4 m)-wide platform to be insufficient. The department also considered that, because the primary beneficiaries of the new facilities would be the Union Company, and the department was likely to derive little, if any, additional revenue as a result of the improved facilities, the railways were not liable for any of the cost beyond any necessary alterations to the facilities on the wharf that they already owned.

Construction of the new terminal had commenced by June 1965 and was completed in December. At a function on 20 December 1965, the Union Company inaugurated the first of two of its new roll on/roll off ferries, and the new facilities. The Railways Department maintained a desire to augment the platform and, in 1968, the District Traffic Manager, with the support of the Lyttelton Stationmaster, asked that the District Engineer seriously consider the idea of lengthening the platform to the end of the wharf, which would allow for an additional two carriages to be attached to trains.

Following the cancellation of the inter-island ferries, and at the instigation of the Harbour Board, the District Engineer requested authorisation from the Chief Civil Engineer for the removal of the redundant veranda on 30 September 1976 and permission was granted on 26 October. On 17 May 1979, it was reported that part of the veranda had been removed but some of it remained, because the area beneath it was being used as a car park. It was suggested that the rest of the veranda be offered for sale to the Harbour Board or removed by the department. The Harbour Board agreed to purchase it and told the department it would eventually demolish it as part of wharf reconstruction works. On 14 August, the department agreed to transfer responsibility for the veranda to the Harbour Board at no cost.

In August 1979, the Harbour Board advised the Railways Department that rail connections to wharf no. 2 were surplus to its requirements. Based on that advice, the department decided in October to remove the rail connection to wharf no. 2, and the District Engineer requested that the Inspector of the Permanent Way make the necessary arrangements.

=== Operations ===
The first train to Lyttelton was a freight consist headed by the provincial railways No. 3 locomotive, which ran through the tunnel to Lyttelton the week of 25 November, two weeks before the official opening of the tunnel and the station. The first passenger train arrived at Lyttelton on 9 December 1867, the date the station was officially opened.

After opening, operations settled down to a schedule of three daily mixed return services between Lyttelton and Christchurch. Passenger traffic on the preceding Ferrymead line had been very light, consisting almost entirely of people living in the vicinity, because the walk over the Port Hills was considered to be too arduous.

For most people, Lyttelton was an important transfer point for their inter-island journeys. From 1895, and nightly from 1905, an inter-island ferry service operated between Wellington and Lyttelton, being the main way people travelled between the two islands. At Lyttelton, passengers had to transfer their own luggage between the ferries on the No. 2 wharf and the trains at Lyttelton station. Beginning in 1902, the express trains pulled up beside the ferries on the wharf, enabling the direct transfer of passengers and luggage between the ferries and the trains. To do that, trains were hauled past Lyttelton station into a headshunt, from which they were moved by a different locomotive around a sharp curve onto the wharf.

A major improvement in operations to Lyttelton was heralded by the inauguration of electrification on 14 February 1929, when the first electric locomotive-hauled passenger service arrived from Christchurch. That was the first suburban electric train service in the country, and its implementation was based on the successful electrification of the Otira Tunnel in 1923. Introduction of the electric services was popular with both train crews and passengers, eliminating the nuisance of smoke in the tunnel they had previously endured. For much of their 41 years of service, the electric locomotives provided 20 daily return services to Lyttelton. The deteriorating economics of their operation, and the need to replace the ageing locomotivesm, led to the de-electrification of the line in 1970.

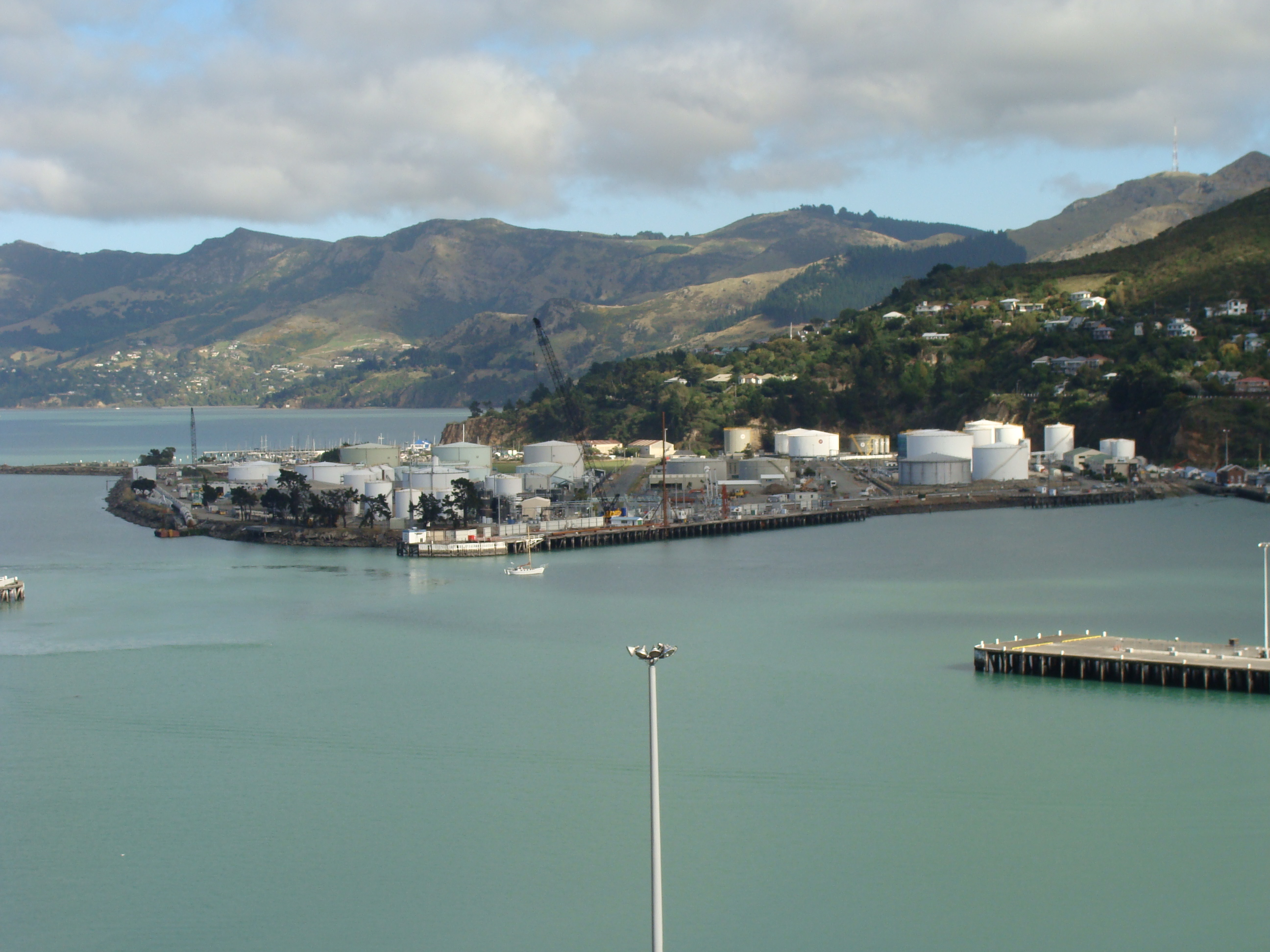
Lyttelton Port oil terminal.

A Drewery rail tractor was based at Lyttelton in 1936, for a trial period, to be used for shunting operations. Members of the shunting staff based at Lyttelton were trained in its use by the locomotive staff, with maintenance carried out by the traffic staff. The tractor was stored in the steam locomotive shed and, for the purposes of evaluation, was used for as much of the shunting work as possible, to reduce the amount of time steam locomotives were needed. Later, diesel locomotives began to make their presence felt at Lyttelton and, in 1969, four Hitachi rail tractors were assigned there. However, steam locomotives were still used for the South Island Limited at Lyttelton until the late 1960s.

In response to a request for the Railways Department to cease blocking access to the Breakwater and Launch wharves in winter months, during which A^{B} class locomotives were used to heat the carriages of the Steamer Express trains, the department sought clearance from the Harbour Board to stand the locomotives on the wharf while the carriages were being heated. Approval was granted in June 1966, on the condition that the locomotives venture no further than 20 yards (18 m) onto the wharf. That was considered to be a permanent arrangement for wharf no. 2, but only a temporary measure for wharf no. 3, pending the arrival of the second roll on/roll off ferry, at which time the ferries and the Steamer Express trains would cease using that wharf. The Working Timetable was amended in September to authorise the use of A^{B} locomotives up to the shore end of the platform.

The transfer of mail between the inter-island steamer ferries and trains used to be a significant source of traffic for Lyttelton. Mail items were transported in hampers, bags, or crates, and transferred to ships using slings. Local services transported the mail between Christchurch and the port in postal vans. Following the introduction of the rail-air service in the 1960s, use of the ferries to transport mail between Christchurch and Wellington declined.

Passenger services between Christchurch and Lyttelton steadily lost patronage following the opening of the Lyttelton road tunnel in 1964. When the line was de-electrified, a limited diesel-hauled passenger service was introduced. However, it was not enough to arrest the decline in patronage and, as a result, the service was cancelled on 28 February 1972. The "boat train" express services that connected with the Steamer Express ferries were cancelled four years later, on 14 September 1976, coinciding with the cancellation of the inter-island ferry services. Those latter services were, from 1 December 1970, provided by The Southerner, which terminated at Lyttelton.

In a letter dated 5 February 1982, the Acting District Traffic Manager made the following points, that give some insight into the type and volume of traffic handled at Lyttelton at the time:

- Apart from some tracks to Gladstone Quay that had already been spiked, there were no tracks that were considered to be redundant.
- Export coal traffic required a storage capacity of around 200 loaded high-side wagons per day. When colliers were loading, backlogs of up to 400 wagons could occur.
- Lyttelton handled an average of eighty container wagons per day.
- It was occasionally necessary to store in excess of 100 UK class wagons at Lyttelton.
- Oil traffic was a significant feature at Lyttelton. A shortage of capacity on the oil sidings often necessitated two or three shunting movements.
- Meat was an important seasonal business, with ships regularly berthing at wharves 3 or 7, no. 1 breastwork, or Cashin Quay, depending on availability.
- Other frequently used facilities included the Sea Cargo Terminal on Gladstone Quay and the loading bank.

== Today ==
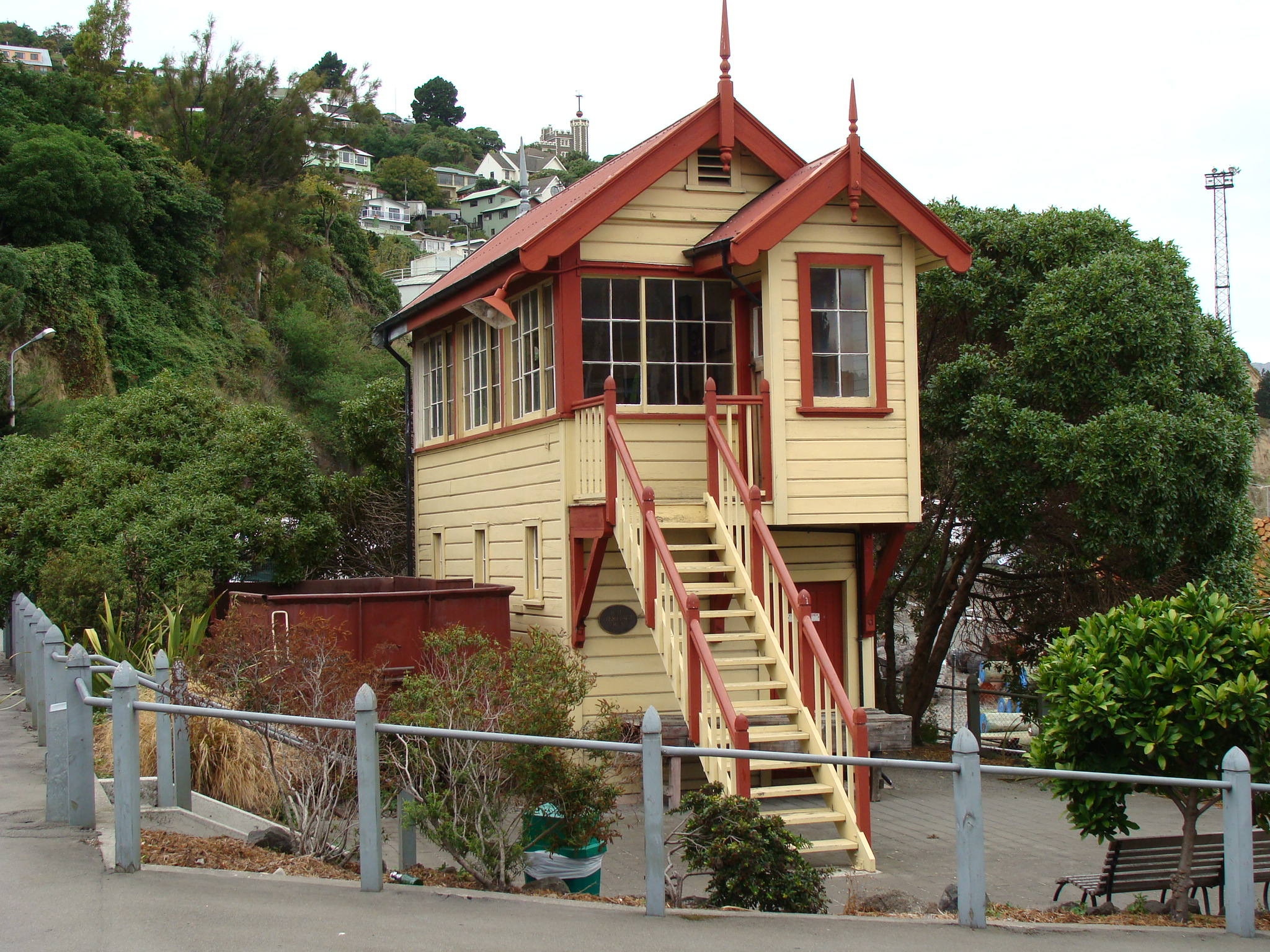
Lyttelton railway station signal box.

The original Lyttelton station signal box is the only building that survives, and, after its relocation, is now sited near the former station building. It was originally located at the western end of the yard near the tunnel portal. The railway station was only recently demolished in the 2010s. The Lyttelton Port of Christchurch owns the land around the former station building, access to which is restricted to authorised personnel. All railway-related facilities on wharf no. 2 have been removed, including the railway/ferry inter-modal facilities.

Lyttelton remains a busy freight yard that continues to serve the Lyttelton Port of Christchurch. Major sources of traffic for the port include export dairy products, coal, timber, vehicles, and other general container freight. New Zealand Railways Corporation staff were based at Lyttelton station through the 1980s for the management of container traffic but have since been relocated. All Lyttelton-based railways-related staff now work out of the station building. Railway operations staff have maintained a presence in the station building where they make use of some of the rooms. The station building has hosted or is currently hosting other short-term private lessees, including New Zealand Express Transport and the Lyttelton Information Centre.

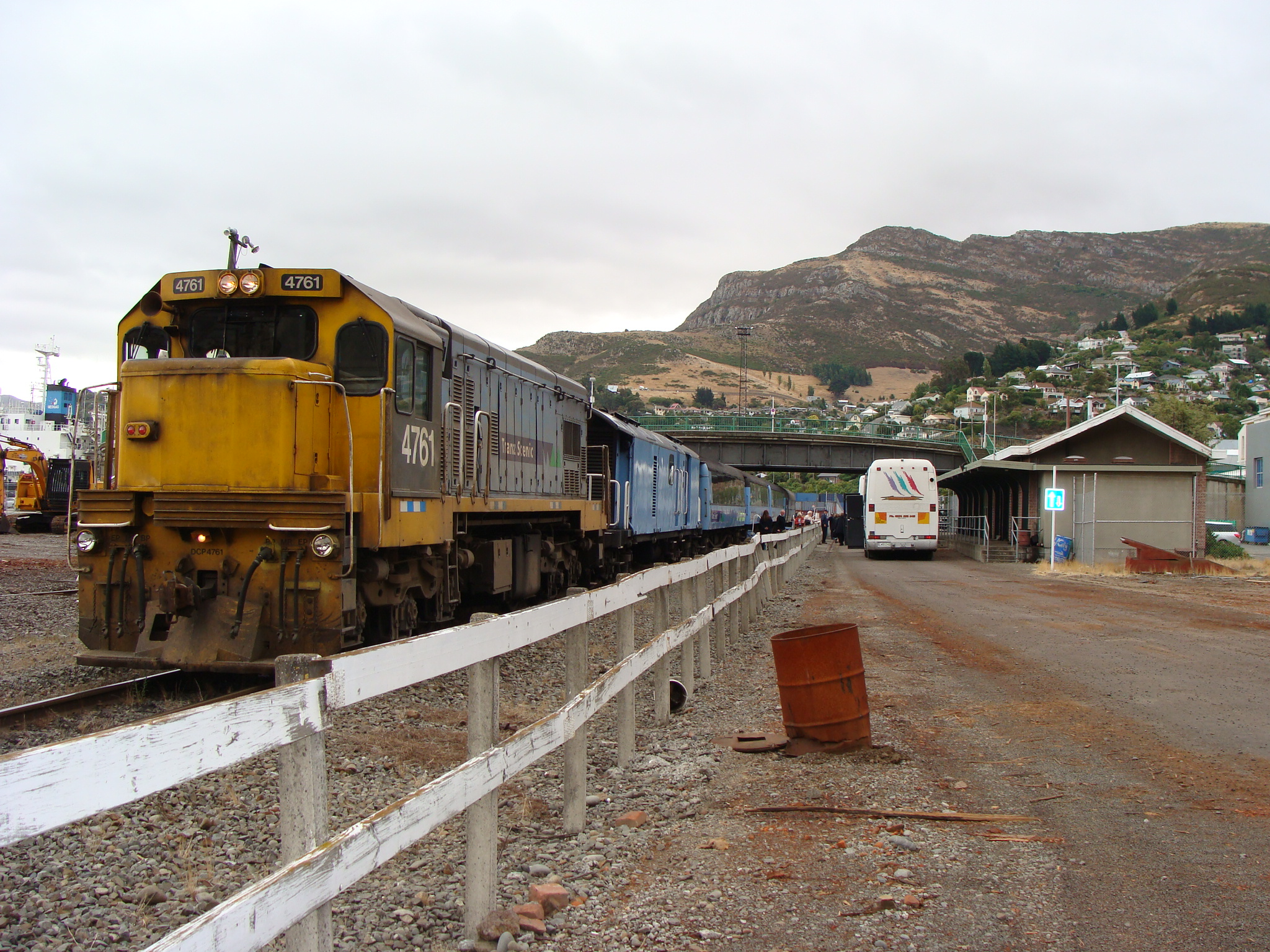
Passengers transferring from a cruise-ship day-trip special train to coaches at Lyttelton railway station having just returned from Arthur's Pass.

Beginning with the 1997–98 summer season, Tranz Scenic provided day trips for passengers from cruise ships docked at Lyttelton out to Arthur's Pass. Initially, passengers were collected by coach from Lyttelton and transferred to Christchurch from whence they departed on the TranzAlpine service. Since 2000, Tranz Scenic have run special trains which collect passengers from Lyttelton railway station and take them direct to Arthur's Pass, using spare carriages from the TranzAlpine/TranzCoastal fleet. This operation has required the use of some office space in the station building, as well as using the station precinct to transfer passengers between trains and buses. Some tour groups travel by train to Arthur's Pass and return to Lyttelton, while other groups only make half the journey by train and complete the trip by coach. Because the track adjacent to the station platform has been removed, passengers board or alight from trains outside the station building on the track nearest the platform. Buses transfer passengers between the trains and the wharf for security reasons. Though the number of special trains varies from season to season, business has been generally improving, with 43 services running in the summer of 2008–2009.

The Lyttelton Port Company announced that it will be installing an extended siding at Lyttelton to accommodate longer freight trains. The new 24-wagon siding will replace two existing 8-wagon sidings, which will reduce the time spent marshaling trains. The move is part of a plan to increase the annual container capacity by 40,000 TEUs to approximately 300,000 and to increase the use of the port-to-city container shuttle rail service. In the long-term, the port hopes to move its operations to new wharves and to remove the existing wharves in front of the town.

== Proposals ==
Various calls have been made for the reintroduction of passenger rail services for Christchurch. Several reports have been commissioned to that effect, some of which have proposed new suburban services along the Main South Line from Lyttelton. Currently there are no plans to implement any of the proposals.

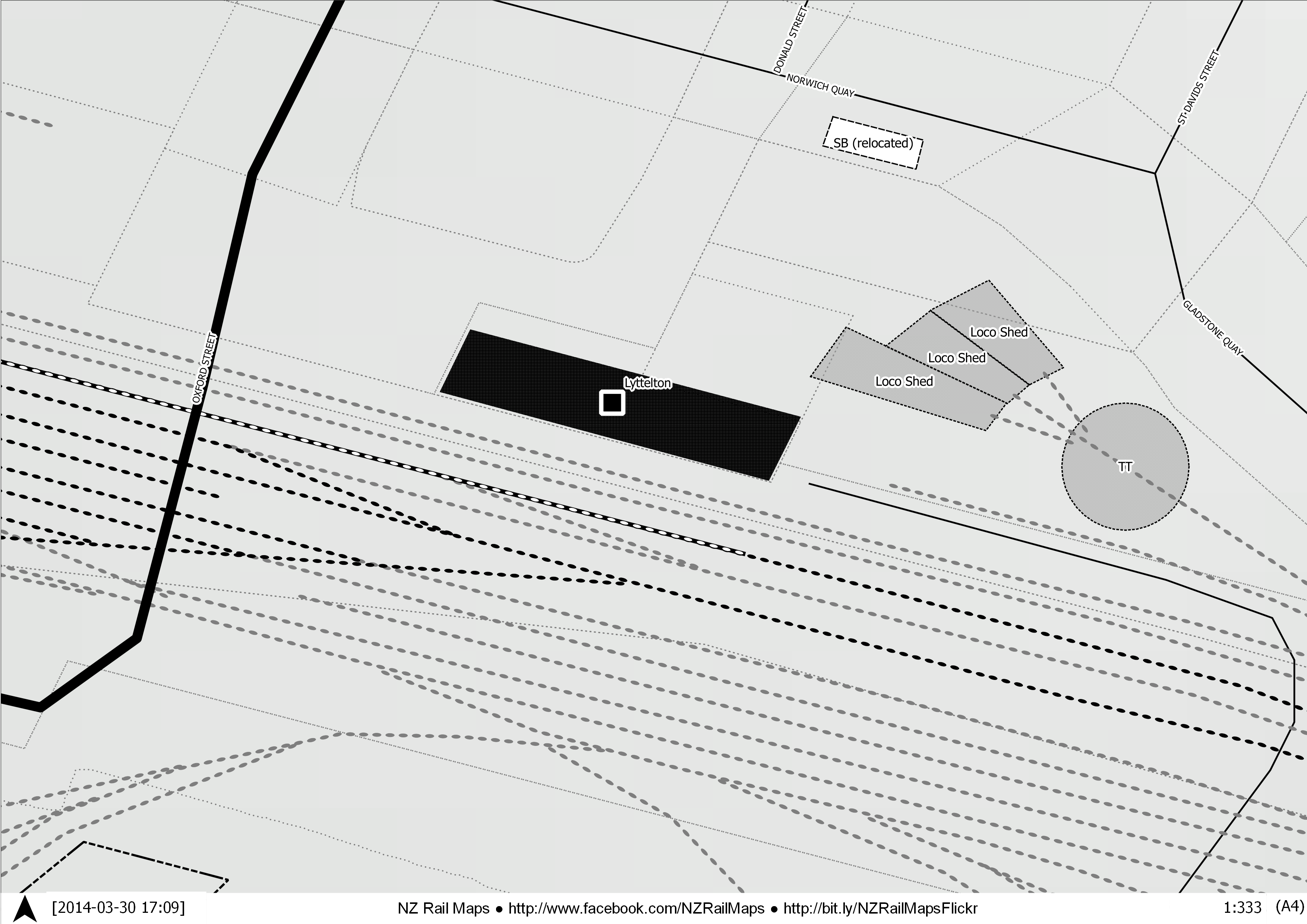
Map of Lyttelton

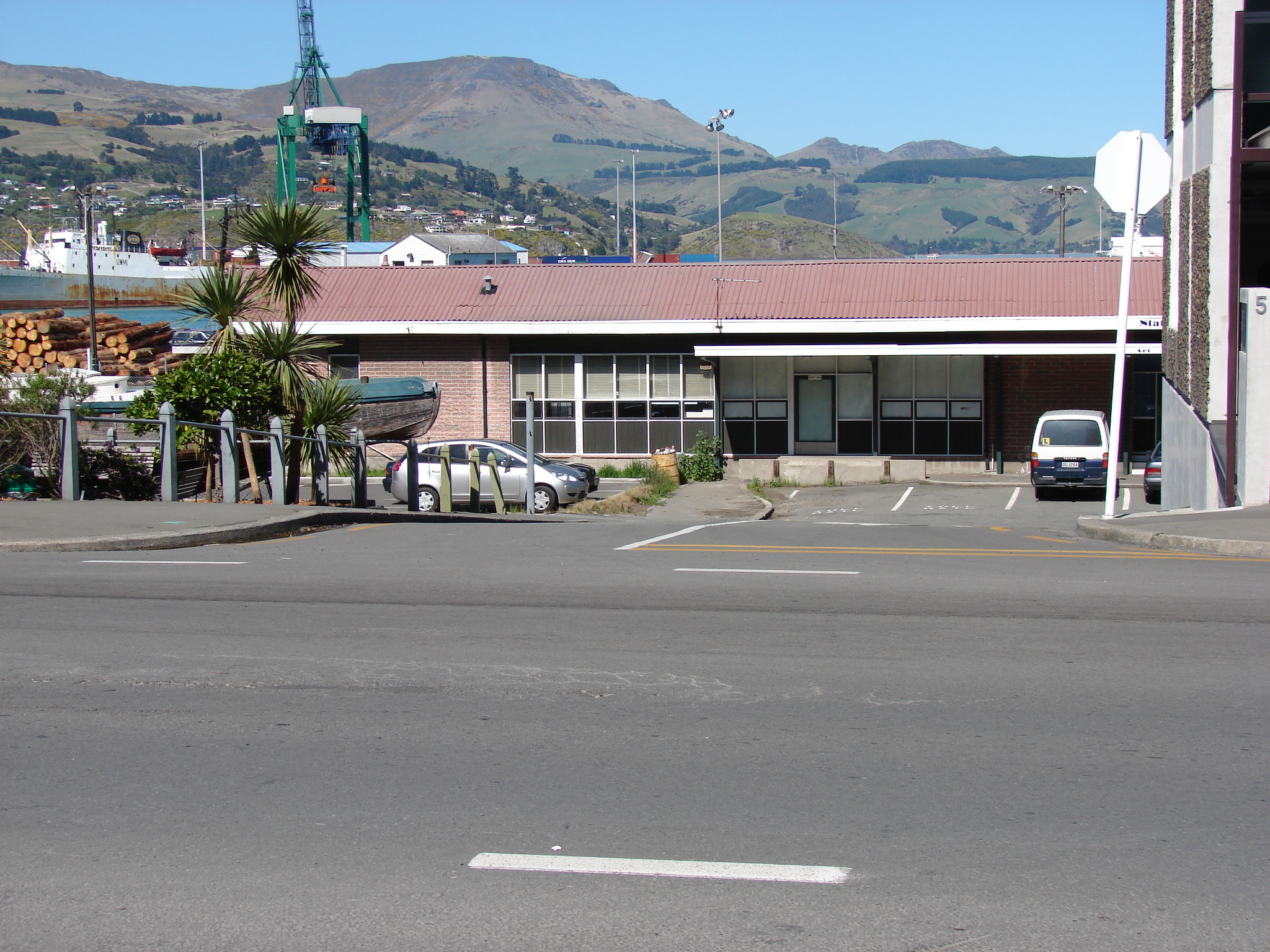
Lyttelton railway station as seen from Norwich Quay.

== See also ==
- Christchurch City Holdings, owner of the Lyttelton Port of Christchurch
- List of Christchurch railway stations
- Lyttelton Harbour
- Main South Line
- Public transport in Christchurch
