= South Australian Railways M class =

South Australian Railways M class may refer to:

- South Australian Railways M class (first), 0-4-2 steam locomotives
- South Australian Railways M class (second), 2-4-2T steam locomotives
