= Type M =

Type M or M type may refer to:

== Science and technology ==
- Type M, a xD-Picture Card
- Type M, a name for the 15 amp BS 546 electrical plug
- Vaio Type M, a kind of Vaio computer from Sony
- M-type asteroid
- m-type filter, an electronic filter
- M-type star
- M-types, an implementation of inductive type
- M-type or M-system Japanese keyboard layout, designed by Dr. Masasuke Morita at NEC in 1983

== Other uses ==
- Audi Type M, a 1920s car
- Beretta 92FS Compact Type M, a pistol
- MG M-type, a sports car

== See also ==
- M class (disambiguation)
- Class M (disambiguation)
