= M-class tram =

M-class tram may refer to:

- M-class Melbourne tram, built 1916–1917
- M-class Sydney tram, built 1906–1907
