= Canterbury Provincial Railways =

Historical 19th century New Zealand railways

The Canterbury Provincial Railways was an early part of the railways of New Zealand. Built by the Canterbury Provincial government mainly to the broad gauge of 5 ft 3 in (1,600 mm), the railway reached most of the Canterbury region by the time the province was abolished in 1876. Edward Dobson, the Provincial Engineer from 1854 to 1868, was the designer and overseer.

== History ==
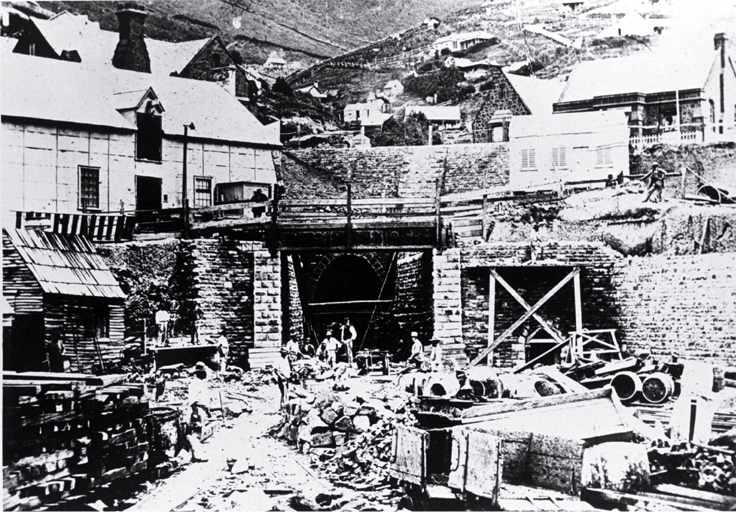
Lyttelton portal of the rail tunnel with construction workers in 1867.

New Zealand's first public railway was opened from Christchurch to Ferrymead in 1863. In 1867 the Ferrymead section was made redundant when the line through the Lyttelton rail tunnel to the port of Lyttelton opened. The contractors who had built the line, Holmes and Company of Melbourne, operated the trains until 31 July 1868, when the Canterbury Provincial Railways took direct control. The contractors selected the broad gauge used for the railway, as it was the same gauge in use for railways in the Colony of Victoria. The first locomotive and rolling stock were purchased from Melbourne and Essendon Railway Company, a railway Holmes and Company had been contracted to construct. The company also brought to Canterbury the necessary railway workers to operate the railway.

The Canterbury Provincial Railways built two lines into rural areas along the east coast, the Main South Line towards Timaru and eventually Dunedin, and the Main North Line towards Marlborough. Both lines were built as broad gauge, as far as Rakaia on the Main South Line, reached in June 1873, and Amberley 50 km (31 mi) north of Christchurch, on the Main North Line, reached in 1876. Following the central government's Great Public Works Policy of 1870 and the passing of the Railways Act 1870, all new lines were to be constructed to a national gauge of 3 ft 6 in or 1,067 mm. As a result, Canterbury Provincial Railways also operated a number of narrow-gauge branches, and the line from Rakaia to Lyttelton became dual-gauge. The Central Government paid for the construction of these branches as part of its Great Public Works Policy.

Following the abolition of the provinces in 1876, Canterbury Provincial Railways were absorbed into the national network, the remaining broad gauge lines of the Canterbury network was converted to narrow gauge by 1878.

== Motive Power ==
The Canterbury Provincial Railways operated ten steam locomotives of varying types, not divided into separate classes. They were all tank locomotives based on contemporary British practice and were built by the Avonside Engine Company, except for no. 9 by Neilson and Company. Nos. 1-4 had a 2-4-0T wheel arrangement: No. 1, named Pilgrim, was built for the Melbourne and Essendon Railway Company of Melbourne, Australia in 1862 but was quickly on-sold unused to Holmes and Company, who were building the Ferrymead line. It entered revenue service when the line opened; 2 arrived in April 1864, 3 in March 1867 and 4 in May 1868. Also in May 1868 nos. 5 and 6, ordered in March 1867, arrived: they were of 0-4-2T wheel arrangement and were considerably smaller. Three more 0-4-2T locomotives followed, each ordered independently, 7 entering service in August 1872, 8 in March 1874 and 10 in June 1874. No. 9 was a diminutive 0-4-0T ordered after 8 but entered service before it, in January 1874, shunting on Lyttelton wharf.

Only No. 1 was withdrawn while in Canterbury Provincial Railways' service, in 1876. When the conversion of the Canterbury lines to narrow gauge was completed, its frame and the other nine locomotives were sold to the South Australian Railways. Despite the ship carrying the locomotives and rolling stock, the Hydrabad, being shipwrecked near Foxton on the North Island's west coast on its journey to Australia, the locomotives and rolling stock ultimately were safely delivered to South Australia and with considerable modification seven of them remained in service until the 1920s.

In addition, by 1875 Canterbury Provincial Railways had 22 narrow-gauge locomotives.

== See also ==
- Rail transport in Christchurch
- Vogel railways
- broad gauge locomotives transferred to South Australia - South Australian Railways I class and South Australian Railways M class
