= NZR EC class =

NZR E^{C} class
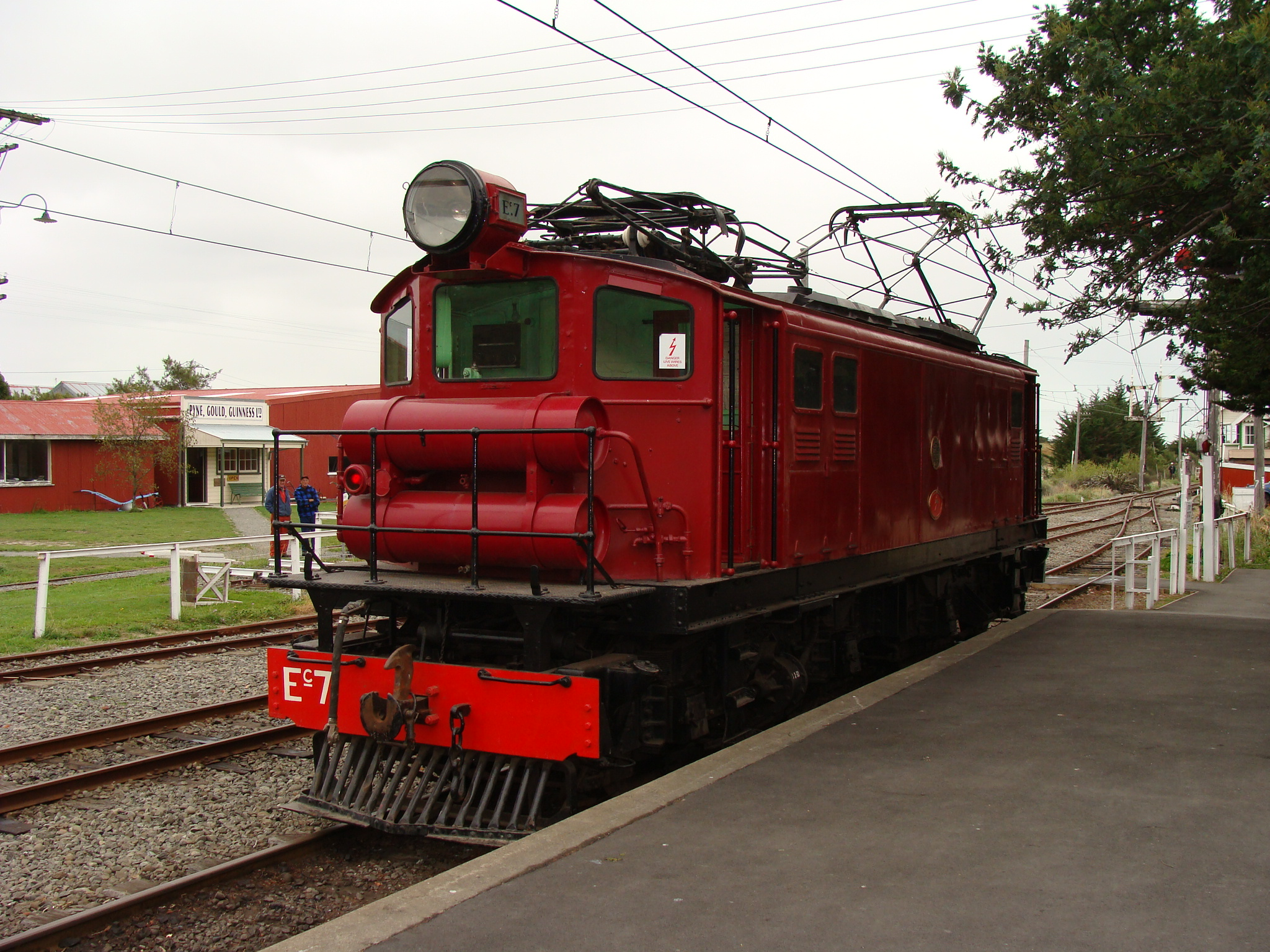
- Sole preserved member of the class, E^{C} 7 stands at Moorhouse Station on the Ferrymead Railway during the Easter 2008 railfan event
Type and origin
- Power type: Electric
- Builder: English Electric, United Kingdom
- Build date: 1928
Specifications
- Configuration
  - Commonwealth: Bo-Bo
- Gauge: 3 ft 6 in (1,067 mm)
- Length: 12 metres (39 ft 4 in)
- Adhesive weight: 50 tonnes (49 long tons; 55 short tons)
- Loco weight: 50 tonnes (49 long tons; 55 short tons)
- Electric system/s: 1500 V DC overhead lines
- Current pickup(s): Pantograph
- Traction motors: 4
Performance figures
- Maximum speed: 85 km/h (53 mph)
- Power output: 888 kW (1,191 hp)
Career
- Operators: New Zealand Railways, Lyttelton Line
- Class: E^{C}
- Number in class: 6
- Numbers: 7 - 12
- Locale: Christchurch - Lyttelton
- First run: 14 February 1929
- Last run: 18 September 1970
- Disposition: 5 scrapped 1 preserved

The NZR E^{C} class was a class of electric locomotive used in Christchurch, New Zealand. They replaced steam locomotives on trains through the Lyttelton rail tunnel between Lyttelton and Christchurch.

== Introduction ==
Since its opening in 1867, the Christchurch to Lyttelton line had become extremely busy with both suburban and goods trains passing through the 2.6 km (1.6 mi) Lyttelton Tunnel, which had been opened in 1867. Smoke accumulating in the tunnel from each successive train became a nuisance for train crews and passengers travelling through the tunnel. Although trials were conducted in 1909 using steam locomotive W^{F} 436 which had been converted to oil firing, the cost of oil alone meant that no further work was done.

In 1925, the English consultancy of Merz & McLellan was commissioned by then Minister of Railways, Gordon Coates, to report on electrifying the suburban networks in Auckland, Wellington, Christchurch and Dunedin. The report, released in August 1925, recommended that of the Christchurch system, only the 10 km (6.2 mi) Lyttelton line warranted electrification due to the volume of traffic and the Lyttelton tunnel. To operate the line, Merz & McLellan recommended purchasing five electric locomotives to haul all trains on this line, and that electric multiple units would not be necessary. The new electrification should be the same 1.5 kV DC as used at Otira and later in Wellington.

Accordingly, six E^{C} class electric locomotives were purchased from English Electric exclusively for this work in 1928. They were similar in many respects to the earlier 1923 E^{O} class as delivered by EE, but had longer bogies, higher gearing for a higher top speed of 85 km/h (53 mph), and more powerful motors. Initially classified in the E class, the later 'C' designation indicated these locomotives were to be allocated to Christchurch, as opposed to the E^{O} class which was allocated to Otira.

== In service ==
The E^{C} class handled all duties from Christchurch to Lyttelton. They were capable of handling 600-long-ton (610 t; 670-short-ton) freight trains and the Boat Train, which regularly loaded up to 400 long tons (410 t; 450 short tons). Early problems with motor flashover and armature shaft fractures during the transition from series to parallel meant that the parallel connections were removed, halving the voltage to the motors and reducing the running speed to 42 km/h.

== Withdrawal ==
By 1967, the E^{C} class was reaching the end of its economic working life. Due to the locomotive changeover for such a short section being costly, and with drainage work going on in the vicinity of the Woolston sub-station, it was decided to reduce the losses made on this section and at the same time make it easier for the drainage work to proceed by withdrawing the electric locomotives. Diesel locomotives would be able to handle all trains through the tunnel.

The first of the class, E^{C} 11, was the first to be withdrawn. The last locomotive of the class in service was E^{C} 9, which hauled the last electric train over this line on 18 September 1970. Five of the locomotives were then scrapped while one was put aside for the Ferrymead-based Tramway Historical Society.

== Preservation ==
Class leader E^{C} 7 along with E^{O} 3 was donated to the Tramway Historical Society upon withdrawal. Stored in the Linwood locomotive depot, the locomotive was transported to Ferrymead by road in 1972, where it nearly ran away during the unloading operation. The two electric locomotives were stored by the tramway section until 1977 when the THS handed the two locomotives over to the Ferrymead Railway-based Electric Traction Group. Both locomotives were shifted onto the railway tracks using electrical leads off the 600 Volts DC tramway overhead and several tracksets, which were moved with the locomotives to the railway. In 1978, part of the Ferrymead branch line at Moorhouse station was fitted with overhead catenary and in 1980, some test runs were done with E^{C} 7 at 600 Volts using the tramway power supply. This led to the acquisition of three mercury-arc rectifiers to power the railway line, as well as the trams and trolley-buses.

With the construction of a substation able to supply the railway, tramway and trolley-buses was subsequently commenced and in November 1988, it was officially opened with trains hauled by E^{C} 7 on the electrified section of the Railway. E^{C} 7 is periodically operated at the Park, usually double-heading with E^{O} 3. This is due to the lack of electrification on the Moorhouse station loop, which does not allow one locomotive to head the train on its own.
