= M-class submarine =

Two classes and a one-ship class of submarine are known as the M class

- Soviet M-class submarine, a class of 148 Soviet Navy submarines built between 1933 and 1947
- British M-class submarine, a class of 3 Royal Navy submarine monitors built in 1917 and 1918
- USS M-1 (SS-47), a one-off United States submarine launched in 1915

== See also ==
- M class (disambiguation)
