= Lyttelton Rail Tunnel =

Railway tunnel in Christchurch, New Zealand

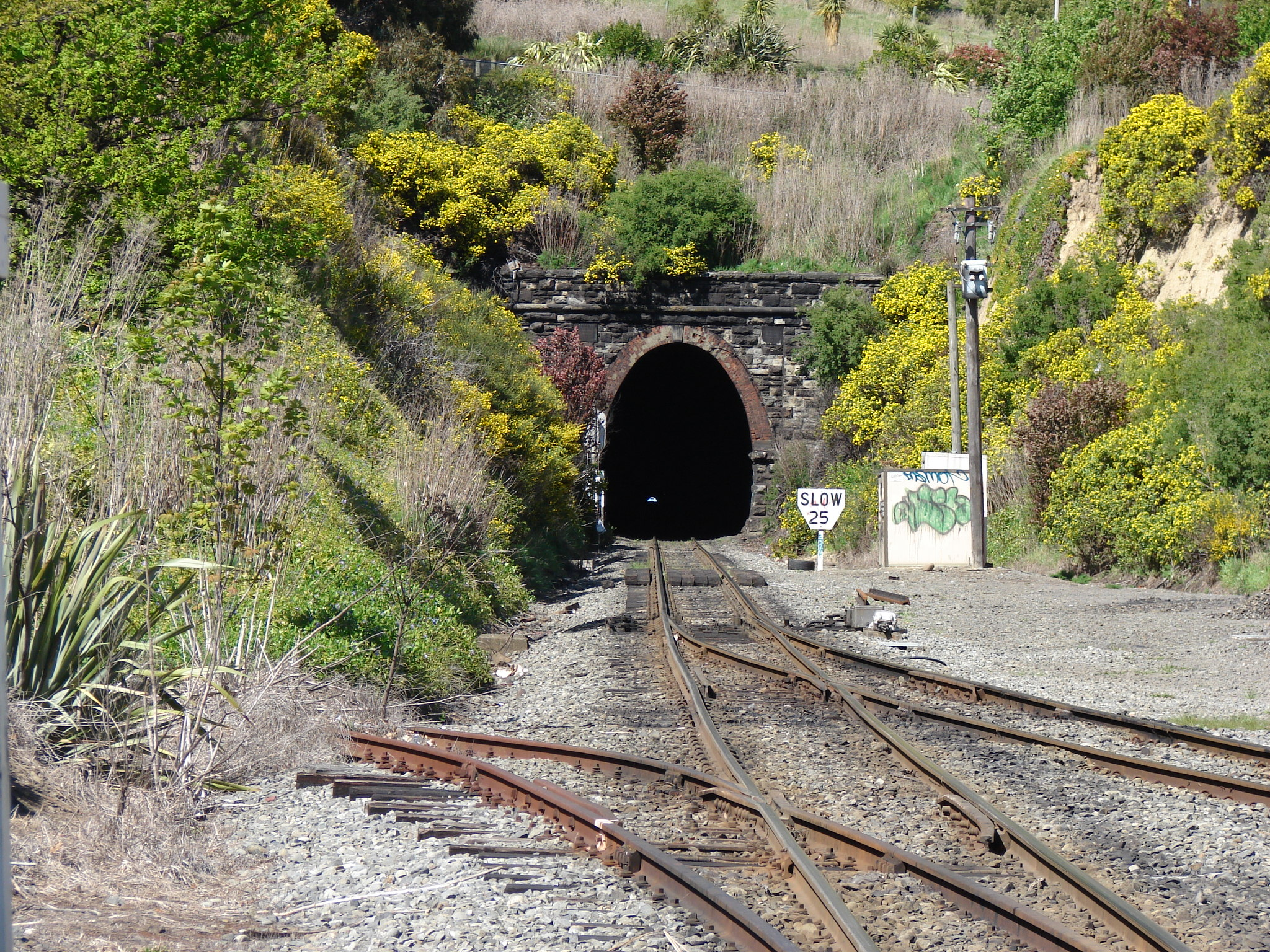
- Heathcote portal of Lyttelton railway tunnel.
- Interactive map of Lyttelton Rail Tunnel

Overview
- Line: Main South Line
- Location: Christchurch, New Zealand
- Coordinates: 43°35′31″S 172°42′48″E
- Status: Open
- Start: Lyttelton
- End: Heathcote

Operation
- Opened: 9 December 1867
- Owner: KiwiRail
- Operator: KiwiRail

Technical
- Line length: 2.595 km (1.612 mi)
- Track gauge: 1,600 mm (5 ft 3 in) (1863–1876); 1,067 mm (3 ft 6 in) (1876–present)
- Electrified: 1500 V overhead (1929–1970)

The Lyttelton Rail Tunnel, initially called the Moorhouse Tunnel, links the city of Christchurch with the port of Lyttelton in the Canterbury region of New Zealand's South Island. It is the country's oldest operational rail tunnel, and is on the Lyttelton Line, one of the first railways built by Canterbury Provincial Railways.

On completion in 1867 it became the first tunnel in the world to be taken through the side of an extinct volcano, and at 2.6 km (1.6 mi), the longest in the country. Its opening made the Ferrymead Railway, New Zealand's first public railway line, obsolete.

== History ==
=== Background ===
Organised European settlement of Canterbury began in December 1850 with the arrival of the first Canterbury Association settlers. The settlers had two options for transporting themselves and their goods between the harbour at Lyttelton and the Canterbury plains: the Bridle Path over the Port Hills, or by ship over the Sumner Bar then up either the Ōpāwaho / Heathcote or Avon / Ōtākaro Rivers.

Captain Joseph Thomas had considered a tunnel between the deep-water port at Lyttelton and the Canterbury Plains in 1849 but rejected the idea because he had neither the money nor the workforce to consider such a project and he wanted nothing to distract from building the road he had planned between Lyttelton and Sumner. During 1851, J. Tullock, a Lyttelton auctioneer, commissioned Edward Jollie and John Boys to survey a low-level tunnel between the port and the plains because he wanted to know how long one would be so he could estimate the costs. They presented Tullock with plan and section drawings, which Jollie believed were sent to London.

Shortly after the Canterbury Association settlers arrived in Lyttelton a meeting of the Society of Land-Purchasers was held and one of the first things the Society did was to appoint a Select Committee consisting of Guise Brittan, William Bayly Bray, James E. FitzGerald, and Richard Pollard to enquire into the best means of improving the communication between the Port and the Canterbury plains. The Select Committee heard that a tunnel on the line proposed would start about 180 feet above sea level, almost a mile long and was roughly estimated to cost between 100,000 and 150,000 pounds. The Committee's report was released on 1 November 1851, but took over a month to be printed and published. On 6 December 1851, the Society of Land-Purchasers held a special general meeting to consider a Report of the Select Committee upon the best means of communication between the Port and the Plains. Rev. O. Mathias felt a tunnel was "too visionary and chimerical" and the colony could not afford to throw away money. The meeting resolved to seek funding to complete the road to Sumner via Evans Pass on the 1849 road line. Nothing was done before the Canterbury Association was disestablished in advance of the New Zealand Constitution Act 1852 replacing the association with an elected provincial government.

It was therefore with concern over access to the plains that the Canterbury Provincial Council, formed in November 1853, established four months later a commission to examine the options for improvement. Only one road route was considered feasible, the Sumner Road passing under the summit of Evans Pass via a 350-yard tunnel. There were two contenders for the rail line: a direct route down the Heathcote Valley and through a 2.5 km (1.6 mi) tunnel to the Lyttelton foreshore or a more circuitous route via the Avon Heathcote Estuary and around the shore to Sumner, where a shorter tunnel would take the line to Gollans Bay and Lyttelton.

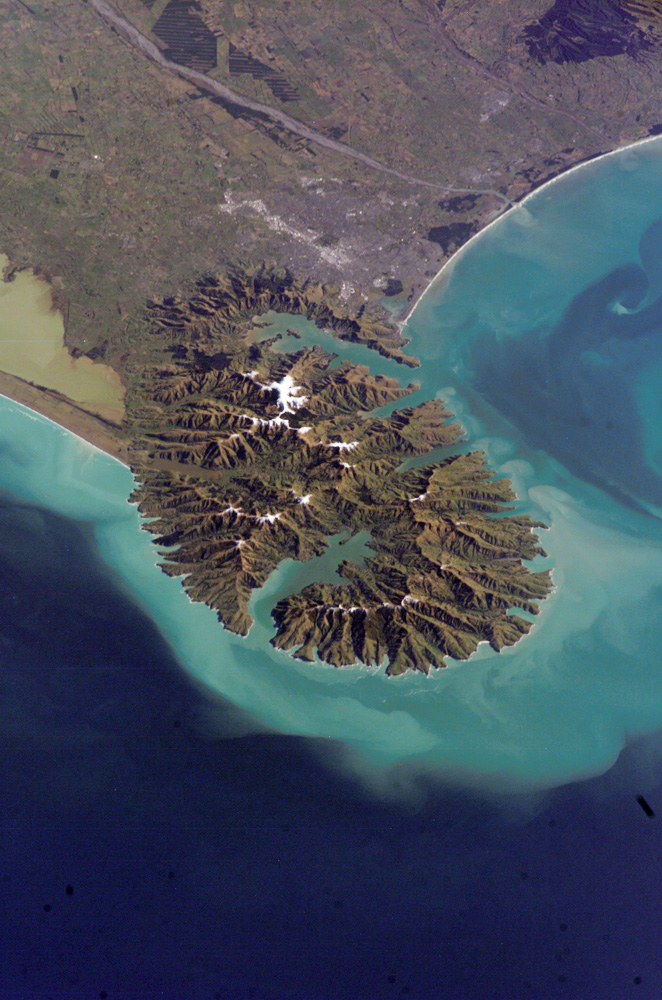
The tunnel allowed passage between Lyttelton Harbour and the Canterbury Plains (top)

The inability of the commission in its final report to make an unequivocal recommendation as to the best option for connecting the port to the plains resulted in plans for the railway to be temporarily suspended. This only exacerbated the problem to the point where, in 1858, Superintendent William Sefton Moorhouse prevailed upon the Provincial Council to consider the matter again. In response, the council set aside £4,000 to engage the services of an engineer and to seek tenders from reputable engineering firms that may be interested in the project.

The provincial Commission that had been established to implement the recommendations of the council, chaired by W. B. Bray, set about investigating the two railway proposals that had earlier been considered, west and east of Mount Pleasant.

Provincial Engineer Edward Dobson favoured the latter route as it meant that Gollans Bay could be used to berth ships at a deepwater jetty without having to dredge the area. However, there were several factors against the Gollans Bay route that had to be considered, not least that it bypassed Lyttelton, a growing commercial centre of some importance; its exposure to the wind; and the lack of suitable land at the bay for port facilities. Though the commission considered it to be the best route to the harbour, they discounted the route and decided against a detailed survey of it, as their terms of reference had tasked them with finding a route to Lyttelton.

The report from George Robert Stephenson, a consulting engineer to the Provincial Commission, was largely in favour of the "Bray" route, and made the following points: it was the shortest route providing access to all necessary points; construction costs would be 32% less than the alternative; it would be cheaper to work; and less expensive to maintain. The only point he noted in favour of the route via Gollans Bay was that it would take three years to construct as opposed to five years for the direct route.

Having considered the available data, the commission adopted the report from Stephenson and requested that he obtain a tender from a suitable English contractor.

=== Popular support ===
Superintendent Moorhouse became a strong proponent of the tunnel project. During the campaign for election of the provincial superintendent in 1857, the tunnel became the central issue, with Moorhouse's opponent, Joseph Brittan, being opposed to the idea. Moorhouse received much support for his position from the residents of Lyttelton, as evidenced by the results of the election: of the 12,000 residents of Canterbury, including 3,205 in Christchurch and 1,944 in Lyttelton, both candidates received 206 votes from the residents of Christchurch. However, overall results were a victory for Moorhouse by 727 votes to 352. Moorhouse later began the project by turning the first sod on 17 July 1861.

=== Construction ===
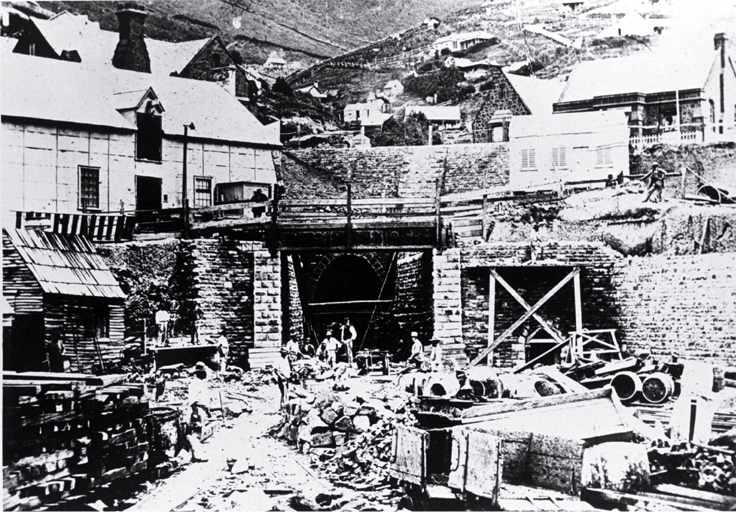
Lyttelton portal of the rail tunnel with construction workers in 1867.

Stephenson retained the services of English contractors John Smith and George Knight, who had agreed to complete the project within five years. They dispatched an agent, chief miner and a party of 12 miners to New Zealand near the end of 1859.

On arrival in Canterbury, Smith & Knight's miners drove trial shafts at each end of the tunnel. Nine chains from the Lyttelton end they encountered rock much more difficult to bore through than what they had been led to believe they would encounter from samples that had been sent back to England. Given this new information, they concluded that it would not be possible to complete the contract for the original amount, and they sought an additional £30,000 to complete the work. After consulting with the provincial engineers, the Canterbury Government decided not to proceed with the services of Smith & Knight. It was later discovered that Smith & Knight were in severe financial difficulty at the time, a fact which may possibly explain their request for the £30,000 extension on the contract.

In light of the failure of Smith & Knight to honour their contract, Moorhouse sought the assent of the council to two measures: to complete tunnel works as far as the test shafts left behind by Smith & Knight, and to seek the services of another contractor by tender to complete the tunnel between the two headings. The council concurred with the first request, honouring its commitment under the terms of the contract with Smith & Knight to assume responsibility for the immigrant workers should the tunnel be abandoned. A decision on the second request was deferred while the council made financial arrangements.

Meanwhile, Provincial Engineer Edward Dobson submitted his own plan for the completion of the tunnel from the workings left behind by Smith & Knight. The biggest problem faced by the previous contractors had been encountering water which leaked into the working faces. This made drilling difficult, slowing progress. Dobson proposed the boring of additional shafts from both ends which would eventually drain the excess water. The work commenced with 340 men at an estimated cost of £42,800. Only 96 yards had been driven in the shafts before the next contractors took over the work six months later.

Moorhouse continued to advocate for the railway, suggesting that the government seek to raise a loan for the project and to engage the services of a "competent and responsible contracting firm" to undertake the works. At the behest of the council, Moorhouse travelled to Melbourne, Australia in January 1861. On his return in May, he brought with him news of success on both counts.

Of the three contractors approached by Moorhouse to tender for the work, the two lowest-priced were discounted, leaving the highest tender, that of Holmes & Richardson. George Holmes undertook by written agreement on 16 April 1861 to carry out the contract on offer on the proviso that "the description corresponded with the fact". He travelled to Canterbury with Moorhouse where he signed the contract. The cost of the tunnel works agreed to was £188,727, or complete with portals, £195,000. This compared with Smith & Knight's figures for the same work of £183,051 and £190,551 respectively. During the course of the contract, improvements to the Lyttelton portal were agreed at an additional cost of £5,000.

Work began on the tunnel on 17 July 1861. Work proceeded at both ends of the tunnel, with the rate of progress determined by the difficulty encountered in drilling through the rock. By the time work started on the Canterbury Southern Railway, 91.66 chains of the 130.66 chains total length had been bored. Hole-through was achieved on the morning of 28 May 1867 from the Lyttelton heading to the Heathcote side. Temporary rails had been laid through the tunnel by mid-November, enabling the passage of the first locomotive, No. 3, on the night of 18 November. The first goods train through the tunnel was headed by No. 3 and driven by Abraham Beverley a week later, to be followed by passenger services on 9 December.

The tunnel was not considered complete until June 1874, by which time the government had outlaid a further £20,710 on "maintenance".

=== Proposal ===
The Railways Department gave consideration to the idea of duplicating the tunnel in 1914, but the proposal did not proceed.

In 1923 duplication or electrification of the bottleneck tunnel was again proposed.

=== Operations ===
At the time the colonial government decided to implement a national railway gauge, they made exceptions for some existing railway systems that had already been laid using different gauges, generally on the proviso that any new track was to the national gauge. One such system was the railways of the Canterbury Province, which were brought under the jurisdiction of a special act of parliament, the Canterbury Gauge Act. This act made provision for the regauging of existing lines by laying a third rail between the two existing rails to allow for the use of narrow gauge rolling stock on the same track. Rather than incur the inconvenience of this approach, the provincial government decided to lay a new narrow gauge line beside the existing broad gauge line from Addington to Lyttelton. The narrow-gauge line reached Christchurch on 7 March 1876 and Lyttelton 34 days later.

The nuisance of smoke in the tunnel created by steam locomotives prompted attempts by the Railways Department to alleviate the problem. In August 1909, they had locomotive W^{F} 433 converted to oil burning to reduce the amount of smoke produced. The locomotive was used for a trial period to haul 450-ton goods trains through the tunnel. Though the modification proved to be efficacious, the benefit did not outweigh the cost involved and the idea was abandoned.

The second attempt was to electrify the line from Christchurch to Lyttelton. Following the successful electrification of the Otira Tunnel in 1923, and a report recommending electrification of the suburban networks of New Zealand's four main cities, it was decided to electrify the Christchurch – Lyttelton route using the same system as had been used at Otira. Fortunately, because the tunnel had originally been built to accommodate the provincial railways' larger broad gauge rolling stock, the tunnel was already large enough to accommodate the overhead catenary without modification. The first electric train ran from Christchurch to Lyttelton on 14 February 1929. Electrification lasted until 1970, by which time the E^{C} class electric locomotives had reached the end of their working lives. With the decline in rail services after the opening of the Lyttelton road tunnel in 1964, and with dieselisation almost complete and only a few steam locomotives left in revenue service, the electrification system was scrapped in favour of diesel haulage.

== Today ==
The tunnel is the exclusive domain of freight trains, with six scheduled daily return services from the port of Lyttelton through the tunnel, including coal trains from Hector and Ngakawau via the Seddonville Branch on the West Coast. Additional shunts convey other traffic between the city and the port.
