= South Australian Railways I class (first) =

Class of Australian 0-4-0T locomotive

South Australian Railways I class (1st)
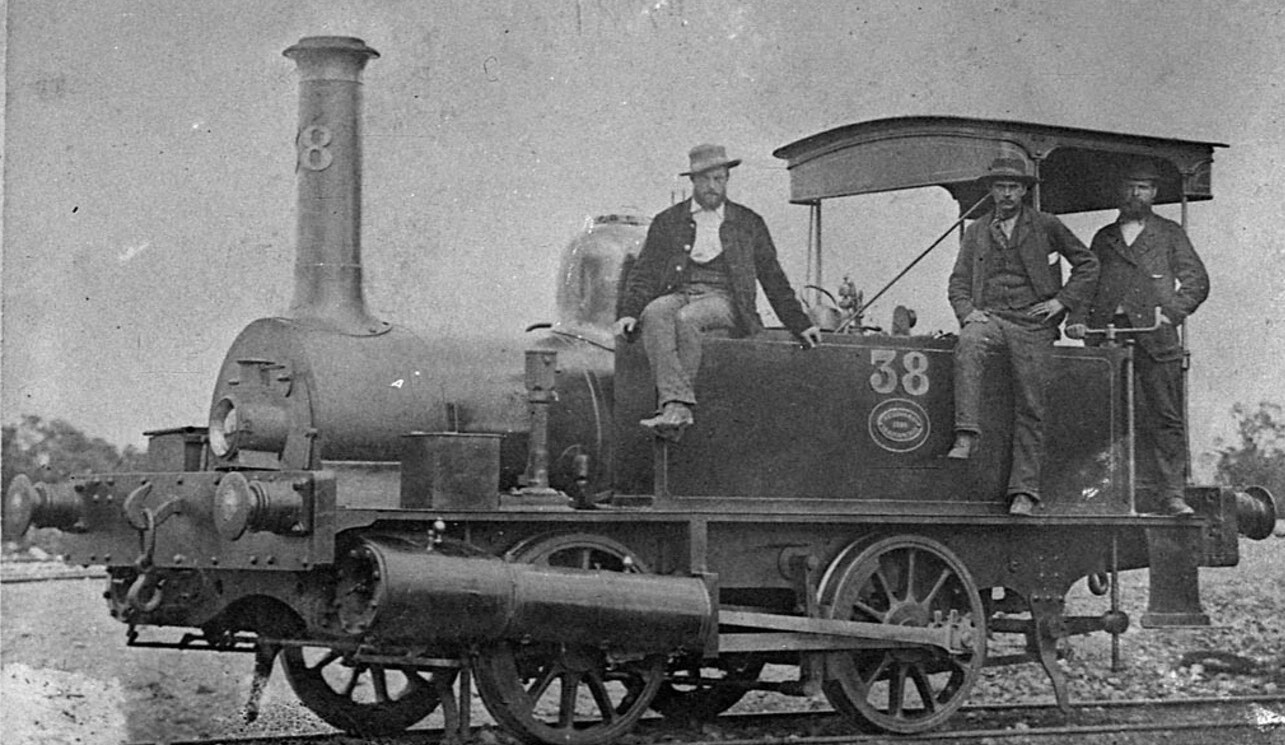
- South Australian Railways I class No. 38
Type and origin
- Power type: Steam
- Builder: Neilson and Company
- Serial number: 1798
- Build date: 1873
- Total produced: 1
Specifications
- Configuration
  - Whyte: 0-4-0T
  - UIC: B T
- Gauge: 5 ft 3 in (1600 mm)
- Driver dia.: 2 ft 11 in (889 mm)
- Length: 18 ft 2 1/2 in (5.55 m)
- Axle load: 6 long tons 18 cwt 1 qr (15,480 lb or 7.02 t)
- Loco weight: 12 long tons 7 cwt 3 qr (27,750 lb or 12.59 t)
- Fuel type: Coal
- Fuel capacity: 4 cwt 2 qtr
- Water cap.: 160 imp gal (192 US gal; 727 L)
- Boiler pressure: 130 psi (896 kPa)
- Heating surface: 359 sq ft (33.4 m^{2})
- Cylinders: 2
- Cylinder size: 9 in × 16 in (229 mm × 406 mm)
Performance figures
- Tractive effort: 4091 lbf (18.20 kN) (3860 lbf or 17.2 kN in NZ)
Career
- Operators: South Australian Railways
- Class: I
- Number in class: 1
- Numbers: 38 then 48
- Withdrawn: August 1909
- Disposition: scrapped

The first South Australian Railways I class locomotive was built by Neilson and Company, Scotland for the Canterbury Railway, New Zealand in 1873 and numbered 9. In May 1878, the South Australian Railways (SAR) purchased it. The ship that transported it to South Australia was wrecked, but the locomotive was salvaged and entered service on the SAR in April 1879 as number 38. In 1880 or 1881, it was renumbered 48. It was allocated to "I" class – which was ultimately to be known as the "first I class" – in 1887 or 1888. In October 1905, the SAR withdrew it from service, then sold it in May 1906 to the South Australian Harbours Board for use in the construction of the Outer Harbour breakwater. It was scrapped in August 1909.

== History ==
This locomotive was originally built as Canterbury Railway no. 9 for work on the 5 ft 3 in (1600 mm) broad gauge Christchurch to Lyttelton line. When the New Zealand Government made the decision to convert the line to 3 ft 6 in (1067 mm) narrow gauge in May 1878, no. 9 and all other rolling stock were sold to the South Australian Railways. On the voyage to South Australia, the ship carrying the rolling stock was wrecked off the coast of New Zealand. No. 9 and the other locomotives were eventually salvaged and completed their journey to Port Adelaide.

No. 9 finally entered the SAR as No 38 (subsequently becoming no. 48) on 15 April 1879, and became a member of the I class in 1887–88. No. 48 shunted the station yard and wharf at Morgan for many years until, in May 1906, it was sold to the South Australian Harbours Board. The locomotive assisted with the construction work of the Outer Harbour breakwater, until it was condemned in August 1909 and eventually scrapped.
