= M-class minesweeper =

Several classes of minesweeper have been named "M". These include:

- M-class minesweeper (Germany), a class of minesweepers of the Kriegsmarine that saw service during World War II
- M-class minesweeper (Netherlands), a class of minesweepers of the Royal Netherlands Navy built after World War I
- M-series minesweeper (Sweden), a series of minesweepers of the Royal Swedish Navy; see List of mine warfare vessels of the Swedish Navy

== See also ==
- M class (disambiguation)
