= Hydrabad (ship) =

Cargo and passenger sailing ship

Coordinates: 40°33′52.7″S 175°11′23.22″E

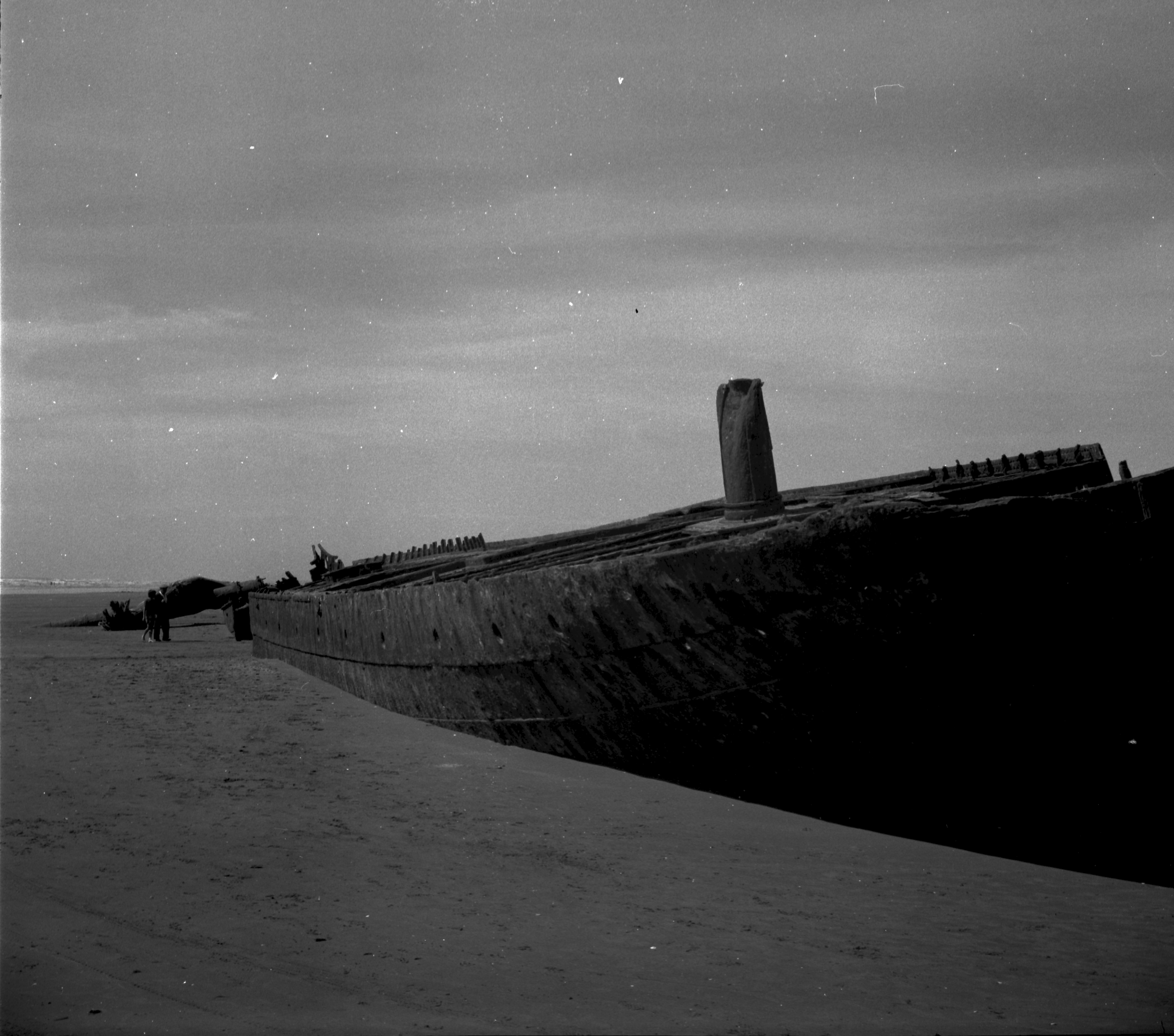
- Remains of the Hydrabad wreck, circa 1973

History

United Kingdom
- Name: Hydrabad
- Owner: Bombay Iron Ship Company, Bombay (first); Stephens and Sons, London (later)
- Builder: Robert Duncan & Company, Port Glasgow
- Yard number: 10
- Launched: 14 May 1865
- Completed: August 1865
- Fate: Wrecked on 24 June 1878

General characteristics
- Type: Iron cargo/passenger sailing ship
- Tonnage: 1339 tons net
- Length: 229 ft 6 in (70.0 m)
- Beam: 37.2 ft (11.3 m)
- Draught: 23.2 ft (7.1 m)
- Sail plan: full-rigged ship

Hydrabad was an iron cargo and passenger sailing ship, built in Scotland and launched in 1865. She was owned by several successive companies, and served until being wrecked off the coast of New Zealand in 1878. There were several attempts to salvage her, but they all failed, and the wreck was left to deteriorate on the shoreline.

== Construction and early years ==
She was built by Robert Duncan & Company, of Port Glasgow, Scotland and launched on 14 May 1865. She was completed in August 1865, and initially owned by the Bombay Iron Ship Company, of Bombay. She was later acquired by Stephens and Sons, of London. Hydrabad was a full-rigged ship with three masts, built of iron. She was 229 ft 6 in (70.0 m) long, had a beam of 37.2 ft (11.3 m), and a draught of 23.2 ft (7.1 m). She had two holds, and an ornately carved figurehead of a Hindu warrior. Her accommodation was lavishly furnished.

== Wreck ==
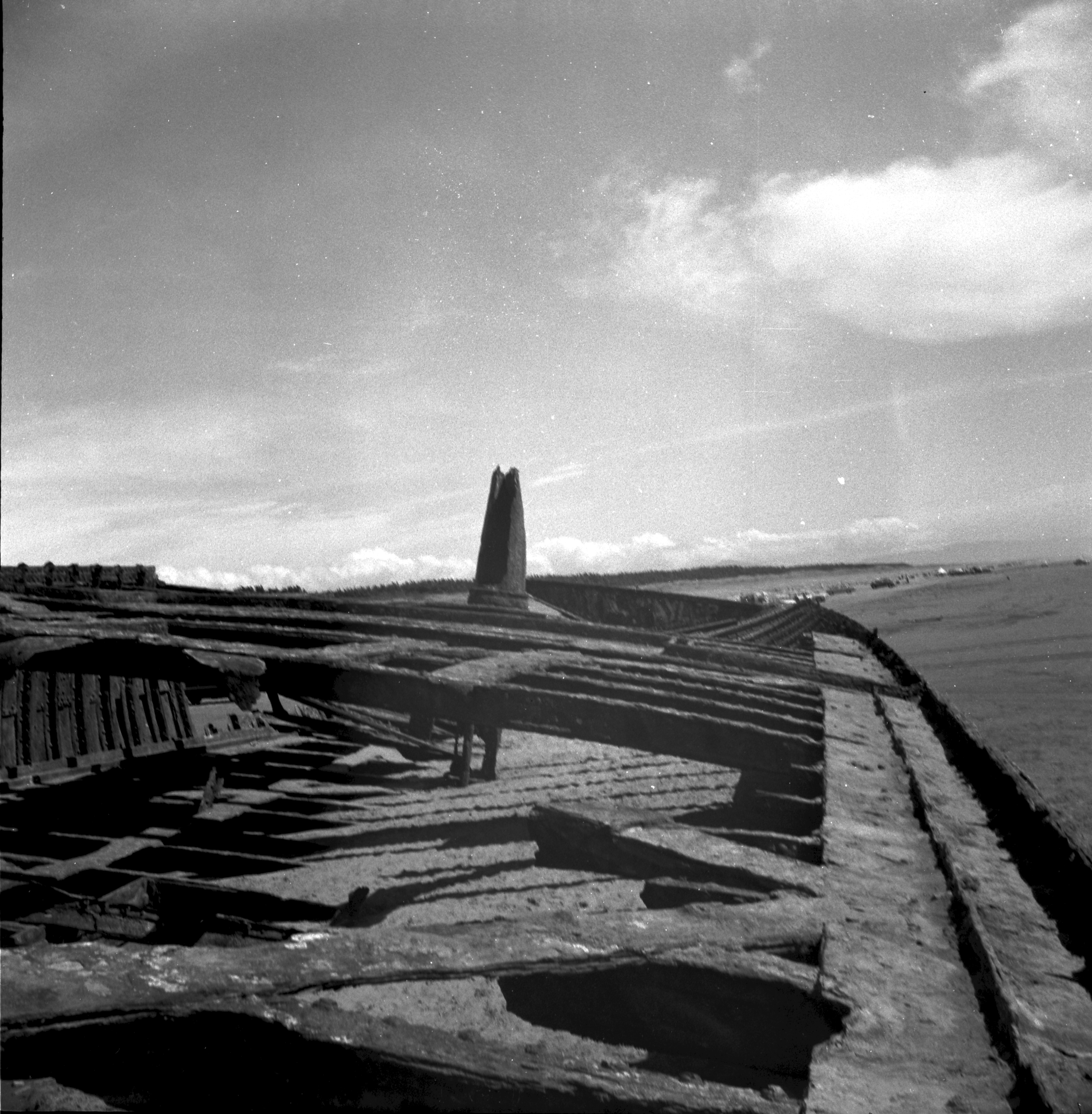
View of Hydrabad wreck at deck level, Waitarere Beach, circa 1973

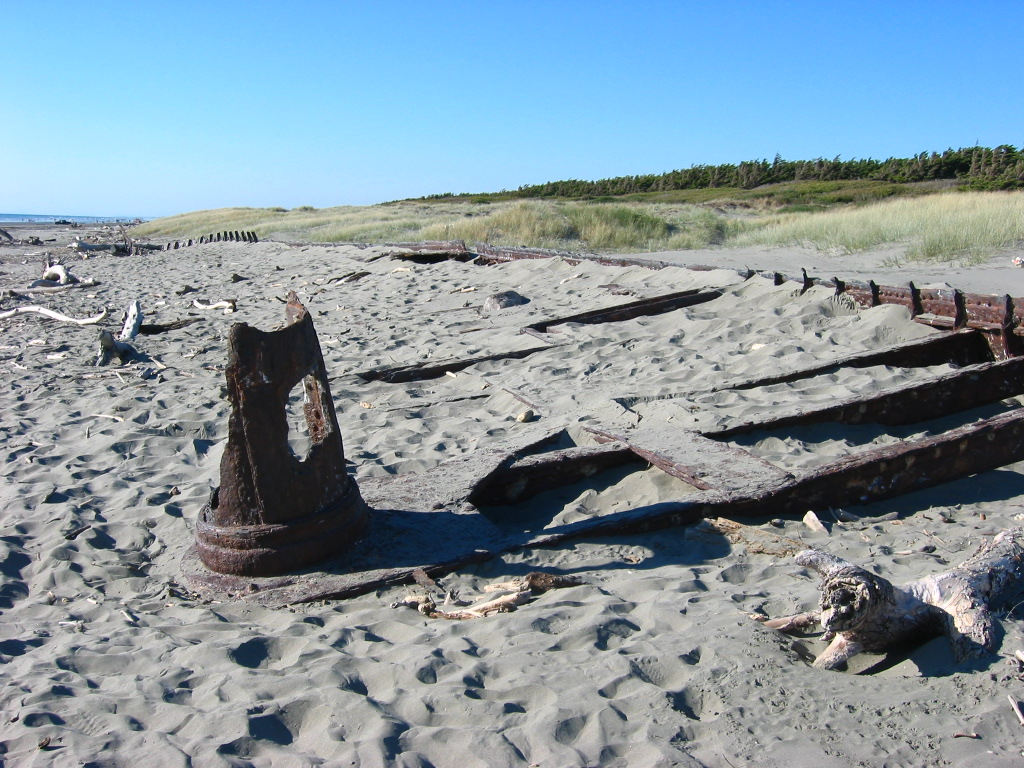
Remains of the Hydrabad, Waitarere Beach, 2003

Hydrabad was bound from Lyttelton to Adelaide, carrying broad gauge rolling stock which had been sold by the Canterbury Provincial Railways to the South Australian government. While making the voyage she became caught in a severe storm on 24 June 1878. Her captain, a man named Holmwood, ran the ship aground on Waitarere Beach five kilometres south of the mouth of the Manawatu River in the North Island, to increase the passengers' and crew's chances of survival. There were no deaths in the wreck. Two attempts were made to refloat the vessel, the first in November 1878, and another on 7 January 1879. During the latter attempt, the steamer SS Glenelg managed to tow Hydrabad off the beach, but she then began to rapidly take on water. The attempt was abandoned and Hydrabad was left to drift up the beach, preparatory to her cargo being unloaded and taken to Foxton. Eventually a fire broke out, buckling her hull planks, and the wreck was abandoned. She had been insured for £15,000 and her cargo for £24,500.

The remains of Hydrabad were washed further and further up the beach by later storms, and today the wreck lies well above the high-water mark. It is periodically uncovered and recovered by shifting sands. The nearby community of Waitarere Beach commissioned a survey of the Hydrabad from the Maritime Archaeological Association of New Zealand, to investigate the rate of decay of the wreck, and the possibility of creating a memorial using some or all of the remains.

As of 2024, a blue marker indicates its whereabouts.
