= Class M =

Class M may refer to:

- Class M (or M-class) planet, a classification used in the Star Trek media franchise
- Class M star, a stellar classification
- Class M, a driver's license, for motorcycles in the United States
- SCORE Class M-Truck, off-road racing medium utility vehicles

== See also ==
- M class (disambiguation)
