= South Australian Railways M class (second) =

Class of Australian 2-4-2T locomotives

Type and origin
- Power type: Steam
- Builder: Phoenix Foundry - Ballarat, Victoria; David Munro & Co. - Melbourne, Victoria
- Build date: 1889-1894
- Total produced: 20
Specifications
- Configuration
  - Whyte: 2-4-2T(1′B1′ T)
- Gauge: 1,600 mm (5 ft 3 in)
- Driver dia.: 5 ft 0 in (1,524 mm)
- Length: 33 ft 8 in (10.26 m)
- Height: 12 ft 9 1/2 in (3,898.9 mm)
- Axle load: 16 long tons 8 cwt (36,700 lb or 16.7 t)
- Total weight: 53 long tons 8 cwt (119,600 lb or 54.3 t)
- Fuel type: Coal
- Fuel capacity: 2 long tons 10 cwt (5,600 lb or 2.5 t)
- Water cap.: 1,600 imp gal (1,900 US gal; 7,300 L)
- Firebox
  - Grate area: 17.8 sq ft (1.65 m^{2})
- Boiler pressure: 140 psi (965 kPa)
- Heating surface
  - Firebox: 83.4 sq ft (7.75 m^{2})
  - Tubes: 988.7 sq ft (91.85 m^{2})
- Cylinders: 2
- Cylinder size: 17.5 in × 26 in (444 mm × 660 mm)
Performance figures
- Tractive effort: 14,025 lbf (62.39 kN)
Career
- Operators: South Australian Railways; Victorian Railways
- Class: M
- Numbers: 256-275
- Delivered: 1920
- First run: 1920
- Last run: 1925-1935
- Retired: 1925-1935
- Withdrawn: 1925-1935
- Preserved: 0
- Scrapped: 1925-1935
- Disposition: All SAR variants scrapped

The South Australian Railways M class (second) was a group of twenty 2-4-2T engines sold to the SAR by the Victorian Railways for $3,300 each between June 1920 and October 1922. The class was formerly the Victorian Railways' E class.
