= Lyttelton Line =

Railway line between Lyttelton and Christchurch, New Zealand

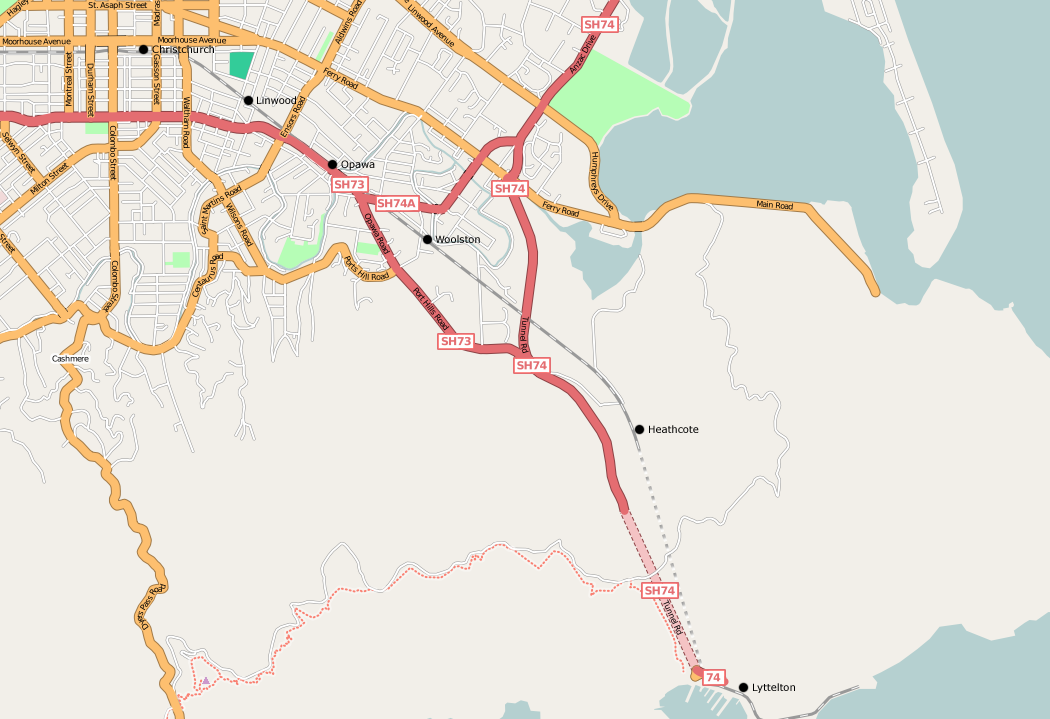
- Map of the Lyttelton Line route.

Overview
- Status: Operational
- Owner: KiwiRail
- Locale: Christchurch, New Zealand
- Termini: Lyttelton; Christchurch

Service
- Type: KiwiRail rail freight
- System: New Zealand Government Railways Department
- Operator: KiwiRail

History
- Opened: 9 December 1867

Technical
- Line length: 10 kilometres (6.2 mi)
- Number of tracks: Single track (Lyttelton – Heathcote); Double track (Heathcote – Christchurch)
- Character: Metropolitan
- Track gauge: 3 ft 6 in (1,067 mm)
- Electrification: 14 February 1929 – 18 September 1970

Lyttelton Line is a name sometimes used to refer to the section of the Main South Line in New Zealand's South Island between Lyttelton and Christchurch, and can also be used to refer to the operations on this section. As it has always been part of the Main South Line (originally the Canterbury Great Southern Railway), this name has never been officially used to refer to the track itself.

The line between Lyttelton and Christchurch is notable for several reasons, including: incorporating part of the first public railway in New Zealand, between Ferrymead and Christchurch; including in its route the still operational first railway tunnel in New Zealand; and, having been the site of the first electrified suburban service in New Zealand.

== History ==
Part of the Lyttelton Line was originally operated as New Zealand's first public railway, connecting the city of Christchurch to a wharf at Ferrymead. Because of the inaccessibility of the harbour at Lyttelton, shipping traffic berthed at the Ferrymead wharf from which people and supplies were transported to Christchurch by train. The construction of such a long and expensive tunnel and line was controversial in the 1850s and 1860s, see William Moorhouse. Following the opening of the Lyttelton rail tunnel on 9 December 1867, the portion of the line from the main line to the wharf reverted to branch line status, but quickly lost its traffic to the line through to Lyttelton and became a siding after July 1868.

As with other railway lines then under construction by the Canterbury Provincial Council, the line and the tunnel were constructed to accommodate 5 ft 3 in (1,600 mm) rolling stock at the behest of contractors Holmes & Richardson of Melbourne, as this was the gauge they were already working with in Victoria. The line remained this way until, following the abolition of provincial government in New Zealand and the establishment of a new uniform national track gauge, the line was converted to 3 ft 6 in (1,067 mm) by April 1876. Double-tracking of the line was completed as far as Heathcote in 1878. Though NZR considered duplicating the Lyttelton tunnel in 1914, this never went ahead.

== Operations ==
The Lyttelton Line has been host to a gamut of train operations, from suburban and long-haul passenger services to freight trains, as well as steam, electric and diesel motive power.

=== Suburban passenger services ===
From the opening of the Lyttelton tunnel, passenger services were provided on mixed trains which initially ran six times daily. It was not until 5 November 1872 that the mixed services ceased and a new timetable scheduled 5 daily passenger trains, increasing to seven daily services on 9 February 1876. These services were popular with school pupils travelling from Lyttelton to classes in Christchurch, and with workers travelling from Woolston and Heathcote to jobs in Lyttelton. It was found that the separation of passenger and goods traffic led to a reduction in operational costs, with savings made in fuel and wear-and-tear on machinery.

Increases in traffic density and train speed on the line required a reduction in the number of stops made by the passenger trains in 1870. The trains had been stopping at the intermediate stations of Heathcote, Hillsborough (Woolston), and Opawa, but with the adjustments to the timetable, the number of stops at Hillsborough was reduced to two daily. By 1874, it was possible for those trains not needing to stop at Hillsborough or Opawa to complete the trip to Lyttelton in 15 minutes. Normal service times ranged from 15 to 25 minutes.

Primarily motivated by a desire to eliminate the smoke nuisance in the tunnel and to cater for an increasing amount of traffic, the line was electrified in 1929. For most of the period during which electric services operated, 20 return services were provided daily, with the trip taking about 17 minutes. The 1952 working timetable shows a schedule of 23 passenger trains and 11 goods trains each way on weekdays.

One of the biggest advantages enjoyed by the suburban passenger services on the Lyttelton Line for many years was the lack of competition from the roads due to the absence of a convenient road connection between Lyttelton and Christchurch. This changed with the opening of the Lyttelton road tunnel in 1964, and the passenger rail services were consequently cut as demand declined. Following the cessation of the electrified passenger services in 1970, a limited diesel service continued to operate until the running of the last train on 28 February 1972. Thereafter, the only passenger trains on the line were the non-stop Steamer Express’, or "boat trains", until they were likewise cancelled four years later.

=== Freight services ===
The frequency of train running in the early years of operation was limited more by the inadequacy of port facilities rather than the capacity of the railway. All trains of this period on the Lyttelton Line were mixed, with the amount of traffic being insufficient to justify separate freight and passenger services. This remained the case until 5 November 1872 when a new timetable scheduled four goods services per day to accommodate the increasing amount of traffic. The extension of the Main North Line to Rangiora and the Main South Line to Rakaia in 1874 led to a further increase in the frequency of goods services to six per day.

Because of its "isolation", Lyttelton was for many years operated as a railway port. The wharves had tracks running on to them from the Lyttelton yards, and cargo was loaded on and off ships at the wharves directly to and from goods trains. Much of the goods traffic, especially inwards general cargo, was only consigned as far as Christchurch. This often had the effect of causing serious congestion at the Christchurch station goods yard, with wagons frequently being used for storage.

This method of operation remained unchanged until the opening of goods sheds on Cashin Quay in 1965, which heralded the era of containerisation. Containers continue to be a staple of freight traffic on the line, along with West Coast coal and timber. The railways also formerly handled other bulk traffic for the port such as oil. Sidings to the oil terminals west of the Lyttelton marshalling yard are still in situ, but have long been disused.

=== Boat trains ===
Though regular ferry services between Wellington and Lyttelton commenced in 1895, and a nightly service from 1905, passengers were required to carry their own luggage between the ferry wharf and Lyttelton station to transfer to a train.

It was not until 1902 that express trains ran on to the wharf to collect the passengers and their luggage from beside the ferry. This involved hauling the carriages past Lyttelton station, where another locomotive pulled them around a sharp curve on to No. 2 wharf in front of the station. This wharf was operated by steam locomotives until 1970, as an important aspect of the service was the use of steam to heat the carriages. This work was performed by F-class locomotives until 1964, after which Ab locomotives were used. From the wharf, the express services ran non-stop to Christchurch, where passengers could avail themselves of refreshments or the station dining room before the train continued on to Dunedin.

In the opposite direction, the evening express’ terminated on the Lyttelton Wharf. Though this began in 1897, it was not until 1909 that passengers were able to travel directly from Invercargill to Lyttelton, as previously an overnight stop in Dunedin was required. The express services from Timaru were taken all the way through to Lyttelton by the same locomotives until the mid-1920s. In 1927 the schedules were revised and passengers were given a choice of boat trains in the evening. Those desiring to arrive early had the option of a service departing Christchurch at 19:10, but still had to wait for the arrival of the express and the boarding of its passengers and luggage before the ferry could depart for Wellington.

The future of the ferry service was dealt a deleterious blow on 10 April 1968 with the sinking of TEV Wahine in Wellington Harbour. However, it was already beginning to feel the effects of competition from air services, which were greatly improved with the National Airways Corporation (now Air New Zealand) introducing Boeing 737-200 aircraft to its main routes in 1968, and by the Railway Departments own road-rail ferry service between Picton and Wellington, which commenced in 1962 and provided considerable time savings, especially to those north of Christchurch. The first service lost was the early boat train from Christchurch at 19:10 in September 1968. From 1970 "boat train" services were provided by the Southerner, introduced in December of that year, which started its run to Invercargill from Lyttelton. However, patronage continued to decline and the last boat train met the final run of the Rangatira on 14 September 1976. Following the demise of the ferry connection, Southerner trains commenced their journeys from Christchurch. These trains had the distinction of being the last timetabled passenger services to run on the Lyttelton Line.

=== Electrified services ===
The main impetus for electrification of the Lyttelton Line was to alleviate the nuisance created by the smoke exhaust of the steam locomotives in the Lyttelton tunnel for passengers and crews alike. Other options tried or investigated for this line were duplication, and an attempt in 1909 to convert a Wf class steam locomotive to oil burning for operation through the tunnel, a move that proved to be only partially successful, and a study done into the idea of using diesel motive power through the tunnel, an option that was abandoned due to the immaturity of the technology at the time.

The government commissioned British consultants Merz & McLellan in 1925 to report on various proposals for electrification of parts of the rail network. Their report recommended the electrification of the Auckland, Wellington and Christchurch urban networks, and possibly also Dunedin. It concluded that if the North Island Main Trunk through Johnsonville were electrified, that would delay the need for the Tawa Flat deviation. Also recommended were the electrification of the Wairarapa Line via Haywards as far as Upper Hutt; the electrification of the Hutt Valley Branch; electrification in Auckland out to Henderson and Otahuhu; electrification in Christchurch out to Rangiora and through the Lyttelton tunnel; and electrification in Dunedin from Port Chalmers to Mosgiel. Following the release of the report, it was decided to proceed only with the electrification of the Christchurch – Lyttelton line.

In line with the successful electrification of the Otira Tunnel using the 1500 volt DC system with overhead catenary, the same system was chosen for the Christchurch project. English Electric Co. was the successful tenderer for the six locomotives, power supply and overhead contact system.

The inaugural electric train service on the Lyttelton Line departed Christchurch station for Lyttelton with 18 cars and headed by EC 12 on 14 February 1929 at 15:00. Included in the consist was a ministerial car and two special cars for early Canterbury settlers, guests of the department. The journey was made in the record time of 10½ minutes, including 3 minutes to traverse the tunnel. Regular electric train services commenced using the new timetables from the following Saturday. Christchurch thus became the first city in New Zealand to receive an electric train service, preceding those inaugurated in Wellington in 1938 (to Johnsonville), 1940 (to Paekakariki) and 1953 (to Taita).

Power for the electrical overhead came from a sub-station erected at Woolston in which was housed two English Electric rotary converters. They had a rated output of 900 amps, and an 11,035 volt AC input in six phases from two transformers supplied by Lake Coleridge. Standard operation of the sub-station involved the use of the converters on alternate days to allow for maintenance and repair.

With the sub-station being located in Woolston, roughly halfway between both termini of the electrified section, the greatest distance travelled by the current was a little more than 3 miles (4.8 km). As the entire line was double-tracked, with the exception of the tunnel, there were two parallel paths to supply current to, including some electrified sidings. The total length of electrified track was 10.8 miles (17.4 km), including 4.3 miles (6.9 km) of double-track and 2.2 miles (3.5 km) of single-track. Section isolators were fitted at the end of the tunnel and the entrance to Christchurch station so the central section could be operated independently if necessary.

The six locomotives ordered for use on the Lyttelton Line were built in 1928 at the Dick Kerr works of the English Electric Co. in Preston. They were similar in many respects to the Eo locomotives deployed at Otira, but had longer bogies and more powerful motors. They were originally classified E, as were the earlier Otira locomotives, but later became Ec's, short for Electrics based at Christchurch.

By 1970, the Ec locomotives had reached the end of their working lives and it was decided that the cost of continuing to maintain the sub-station at Woolston and overhauling the existing locomotives or replacing them could not be justified. Another factor against the electrification was the operational cost of marshalling trains at Christchurch and Lyttelton to add or remove the electric locomotives from trains for just a 10 km (6.2 mi) journey. It was decided to dieselise the line, and accordingly the last electric train ran on Friday, 18 September 1970. All electrical infrastructure on the line was subsequently removed.

== Stations ==
The suburban passenger trains on the Lyttelton Line made stops at four intermediate stations between Christchurch and Lyttelton. Some of these stations also handled goods traffic.

Distance from Lyttelton	Name	Location	Image	Map	Notes
0.00 km (0 mi)	Lyttelton	43°36′16.64″S 172°43′20.49″E		Map of Lyttelton Railway Station, Christchurch, New Zealand.	Last scheduled passenger services ended in 1976 with the cessation of the Steamer Express ferry service. Now incorporates the marshalling yards of the Lyttelton Port. The station building is still in place, and is now used as office accommodation for Tranz Scenic and facilities for KiwiRail operations staff.
2.90 km (1.80 mi)	Heathcote	43°34′41.30″S 172°42′28.19″E			Formerly known as The Valley, this station was once renowned for its magnificent station gardens. Little, however, remains to indicate the former presence of a station here. All buildings have been removed, but the platform is still in situ.
5.93 km (3.68 mi)	Woolston	43°33′35.79″S 172°40′47.64″E			Formerly known as Hillsborough after another nearby suburb, this station continues to serve as a freight hub for several adjacent industrial customers. The platform and loading bank remain, though the station building has been demolished.
7.24 km (4.50 mi)	Opawa	43°33′9.30″S 172°40′1.10″E			This station served passenger trains for residents of the suburb of Opawa. Nothing of the station remains.
8.38 km (5.21 mi)	Linwood	43°32′47.10″S 172°39′22.35″E			One of the "younger" stations on the line, Linwood was not built by the provincial council. Nothing remains of the station today, though it continued to serve in a rail capacity as the location of a locomotive depot until the depot was damaged in the 2011 Christchurch earthquake and subsequently demolished, with the services it provided moved to Middleton.
9.77 km (6.07 mi)	Christchurch	43°32′25.18″S 172°38′28″E			This was the second site of a Christchurch railway station, following the provincial council's broad gauge station a short distance away. The building was sold in 1991, and served as a museum and multiplex cinema until its demolition in 2012 following damage due to the earthquakes in 2010 and 2011.

== Waltham Mechanical Hub ==
Work on building a new maintenance facility began at Waltham in 2020, with the Scenic Journeys Servicing Centre, which provides for carriage washing, refuelling, waste handling, watering and has an inspection pit. The mechanical hub will replace other Christchurch depots and be the main locomotive, carriage and wagon workshop for South Island/Te Waipounamu, covering 9,200 m^{2} (99,000 sq ft), with 21 maintenance berths, underfloor wheel lathe, wheelset drop table and locomotive axle weigh systems. The hub is on the site of the former Waltham rail yard. It opened on 24 April 2026 by Minister for Rail, Winston Peters.

== See also ==
- Johnsonville Line
- Paraparaumu Line
- Melling Line
- Hutt Valley Line
- Rail transport in Christchurch
- List of Christchurch railway stations

== Notes and references ==
- Churchman, Geoffrey B; Hurst, Tony (2001) [1990, 1991]. The Railways of New Zealand: A Journey through History (Second ed.). Transpress New Zealand. ISBN 0-908876-20-3.
- Quail Map Company (1993) [1985]. Yonge, John (ed.). New Zealand Railway and Tramway Atlas (Fourth ed.). Exeter: The Quail Map Company. ISBN 0-900609-92-3.
- Churchman, Geoffrey B.; Hurst, Tony (1992). South Island Main Trunk. Wellington: IPL Books. ISBN 0-908876-78-5.
- Pickering, A. J. Spicer, I. D. (ed.). Pioneer Electrics: A Survey Of Railway Electrification In The South Island. Christchurch: The Tramway Historical Society.
- Bromby, Robin (2003). Olphert, Lorraine (ed.). Rails That Built A Nation: An Encyclopedia of New Zealand Railways. Wellington: Grantham House Publishing. ISBN 1-86934-080-9.
- Pierre, W. A. (1964). Canterbury Provincial Railways: Genesis Of The N.Z.R. System. Wellington: The New Zealand Railway and Locomotive Society.
