= South Australian Railways M class (first) =

Class of Australian 0-4-2T locomotives

South Australian Railways M class (1st)
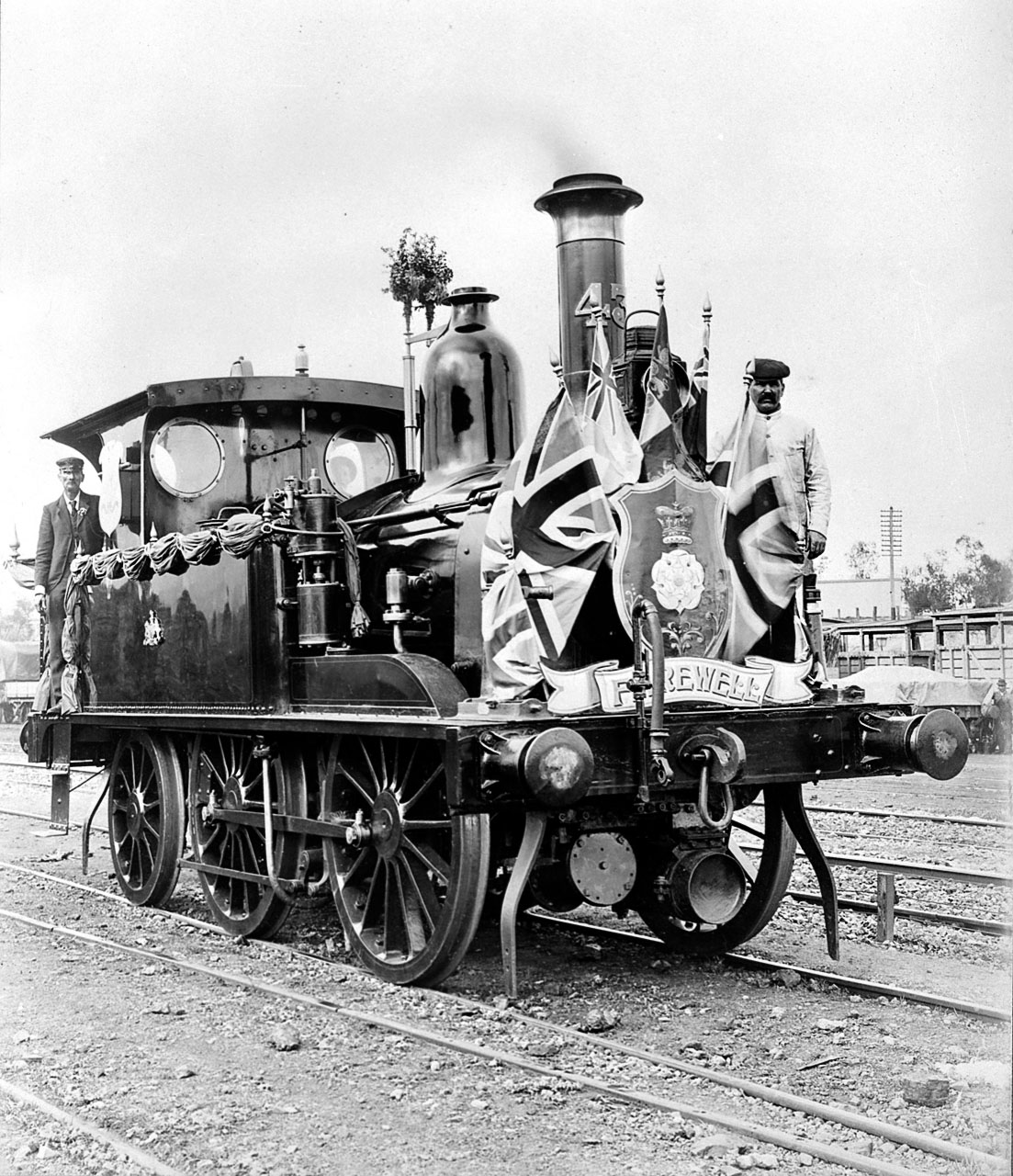
- South Australian Railways M class (1st) No. 43
Type and origin
- Power type: Steam
- Builder: Avonside Engine Company
- Serial number: 740-741, 855, 964 & 1020
- Build date: 1868-1874
- Total produced: 5
- Rebuilder: Islington Railway Workshops
- Rebuild date: 1887-1915
- Number rebuilt: 5
Specifications
- Configuration
  - Whyte: 0-4-2WT; 0-4-2T
  - UIC: B1 T
- Gauge: 5 ft 3 in (1,600 mm)
- Length: 24 ft 1/2 in (7.33 m); 23 ft 3 1/2 in (7.10 m)
- Axle load: 8 long tons 3 cwt 2 qr (18,310 lb or 8.31 t); 8 long tons 6 cwt 3 qr (18,680 lb or 8.47 t)
- Loco weight: 22 long tons 10 cwt 2 qr (50,460 lb or 22.89 t); 22 long tons 8 cwt 3 qr (50,260 lb or 22.8 t)
- Fuel type: Coal
- Fuel capacity: 0 long tons 19 cwt (2,100 lb or 1 t); 0 long tons 16 cwt 3 qr (1,880 lb or 0.85 t)
- Water cap.: 580 imp gal (697 US gal; 2,637 L)
- Firebox
  - Grate area: 8.4 sq ft (0.78 m^{2})
- Boiler pressure: 130 psi (900 kPa)
- Heating surface
  - Firebox: 54 sq ft (5.0 m^{2})
  - Tubes: 454.4 sq ft (42.22 m^{2})
- Cylinders: 2
- Cylinder size: 12 1/2 in × 16 in (318 mm × 406 mm)
Performance figures
- Tractive effort: 4,740 lbf (21.1 kN)
Career
- Operators: South Australian Railways
- Class: M
- Number in class: 5
- Numbers: 43-47
- Withdrawn: 1913-1917
- Disposition: All scrapped in 1922

The South Australian Railways M class (1st) locomotives were originally built by the Avonside Engine Company for the Canterbury Provincial Railways in 1868 to 1874. They were later sent to South Australia in 1878 and were first in service on the South Australian Railways between 1880 and 1881.

== History ==
The two earlier built locomotives (Nos. 44 & 46) were fitted out with well tanks instead of side tanks, while the other M class locomotives (Nos. 43, 45 and 47) did have side tanks.

On their journey to South Australia, the ship which was carrying the M class (as well as other locomotives destined for the country) got wrecked off New Zealand. All the locomotives on board were eventually salvaged, and the M class entered service on the Port line and its branch lines. They also occasionally worked on the privately operated Glanville to Largs Bay railway line. Their duties included shunting on the wharves, and later on in their life they worked trains to Henley Beach, Outer Harbour, Semaphore and on mixed traffic trains on the Northern railway line. The class was extinct by 1922.
