= M-class Sydney tram =

M-class
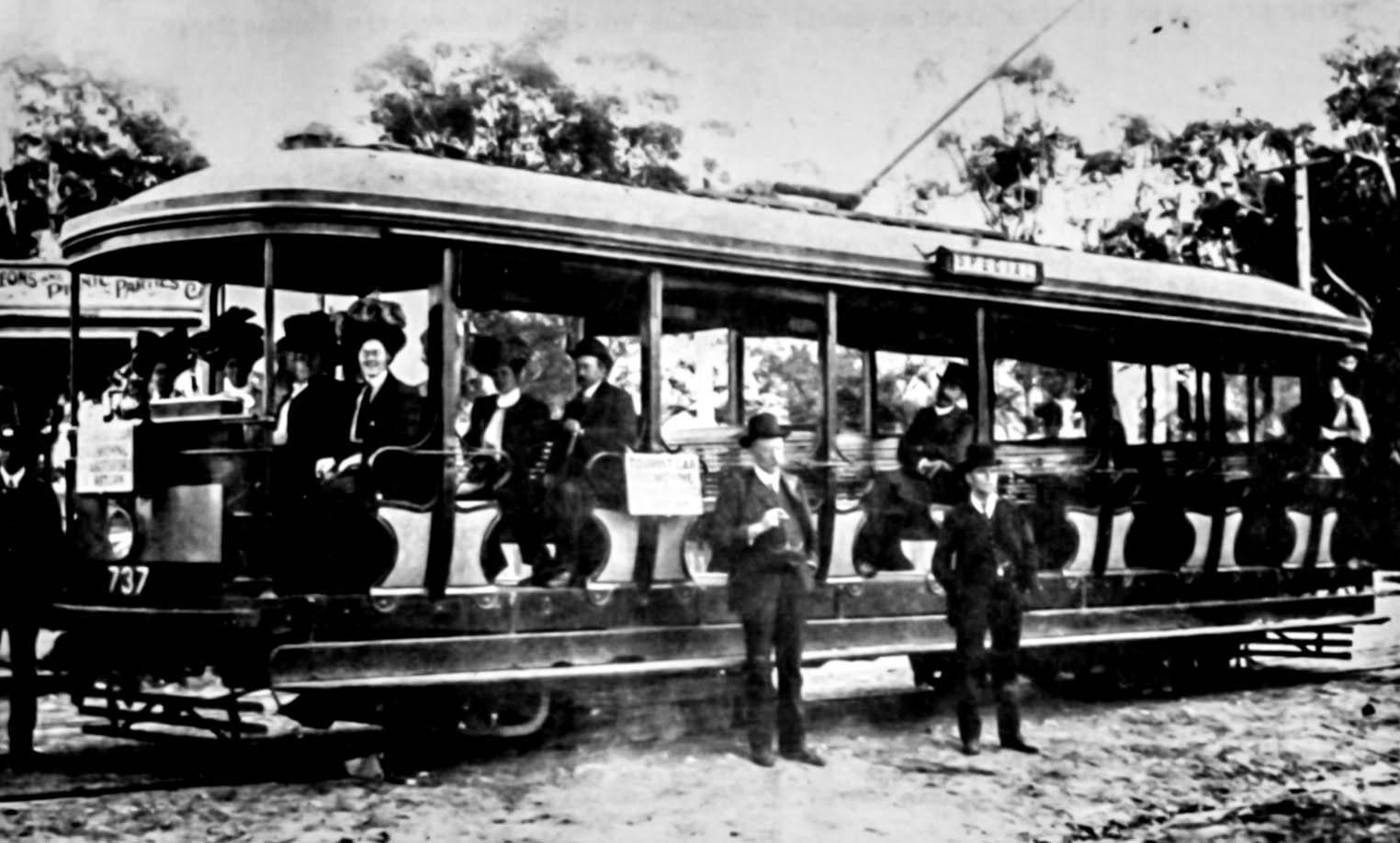
- M737 at Abbotsford
- Manufacturer: Randwick Tramway Workshops
- Constructed: 1906/07
- Number built: 2
- Fleet numbers: 737-738
- Capacity: 70 (Seated)

Specifications
- Train length: 35 ft 6.5 in (10.83 m) later 37 ft 2 in (11.33 m)
- Height: 12 ft 1.5 in (3.70 m)
- Maximum speed: 60 km/h
- Weight: 13.6 long tons (13.8 t)
- Power output: 2 x 60 hp
- Electric system(s): 600 V DC catenary
- Current collector(s): Trolley pole
- Track gauge: 1,435 mm (4 ft 8 1/2 in)

The M-class trams were built by the Randwick Tramway Workshops for use on tourist services on the Sydney tram network to replace two modified G class trams. Originally allocated to Fort Macquarie Tram Depot, they later moved to Newtown and again to Ultimo before being scrapped in 1941.
