= North Line, Christchurch =

Former passenger rail service in Canterbury, New Zealand

North Line
- Waipara train streams out of Christchurch station past waiting Ashburton train, 1950

Overview
- Service type: Commuter rail
- System: Public transport in Christchurch
- Status: Discontinued
- Locale: Christchurch and North Canterbury, New Zealand
- First service: 5 November 1872
- Last service: 30 April 1976
- Former operator: New Zealand Railways Department

Route
- Termini: Christchurch; Waipara
- Stops: 21 (1953)
- Line used: Main North Line

Technical
- Rolling stock: Steam locomotives, diesel locomotives and railcars
- Track gauge: 1,067 mm (3 ft 6 in)

The North Line was the name for the local passenger service that New Zealand Railways ran north of Christchurch on the Main North Line to Belfast, Rangiora and Waipara in North Canterbury, New Zealand. It was made up of three services: the Belfast workers' train, the Rangiora suburban and the Waipara local. The last of the services was cancelled in 1976, when buses took over.

Calls for the North Line to be brought back have since grown, and a 12-month commuter trial from Rangiora is due to start in mid-2027.

== History ==
The line from Christchurch reached Rangiora on 5 November 1872, and regular services began. Until 1876 three return mixed trains ran each day. When the line reached Amberley that year this became one mixed train and two passenger trains, and for some years through passengers had to change trains at Rangiora.

The line ran through residential areas out to Papanui and served the growing towns of Belfast, Kaiapoi and Rangiora. Apart from the Lyttelton line, it had one of the greatest passenger potentials of any Canterbury line, and for this reason it supported a suburban service as far as Rangiora for many years.

By 1916 there were three mixed and two passenger trains each way a day. By 1927 this had increased to five passenger trains and one mixed train, and from October that year an electric railcar took over the midday service and soon attracted more passengers than the steam trains had.

== Services in 1953 ==
By the early 1950s the Rangiora service was at its peak, even as the Belfast service had begun to shrink. On Mondays and Fridays through expresses augmented the suburban trains. They called at Christchurch and Rangiora and, if required, at Papanui.

=== Stopping patterns ===
The stopping patterns below are from the 1953 timetable.

Legend — Stop type

- ◼ Station
- ◻ Halt

Legend — Stopping patterns

- ⬤ – Trains stop
- ◌ – Stops if required
- | – Trains pass and do not stop

North Line services in 1953
Station	Suburban	Belfast workers	Waipara local
◼ Christchurch	⬤	⬤	⬤
◼ Addington	⬤	◌	⬤
◼ Riccarton	◌	◌	◌
◻ Bryndwr	◌	◌	◌
◼ Papanui	⬤	⬤	⬤
◻ Styx	◌	◌	◌
◼ Belfast	⬤	⬤	⬤
◻ Chaneys	◌		◌
◻ Stewarts Gully	◌		◌
◼ Kaiapoi	⬤		⬤
◻ Flaxton	◌		◌
◼ Southbrook	◌		◌
◼ Rangiora	⬤		⬤
◻ Ashley			◌
◼ Sefton			⬤
◻ Balcairn			◌
◻ Grays Road			◌
◼ Amberley			⬤
◻ Greneys Road			◌
◻ Glasnevin			◌
◼ Waipara			⬤

=== Belfast service ===
The Belfast service, called the Belfast workers' train, carried workers to the freezing works and factories at Belfast. A morning train left Christchurch for Belfast to drop off workers and returned in the early evening. It was supplemented by an afternoon pair of mixed trains, a goods train with a passenger car going out from Christchurch and the return from Belfast. The first cut was the Saturday midday train from Belfast to Christchurch, cancelled in January 1946. The Belfast service ended in July 1955, when the afternoon train from Christchurch and the evening train from Belfast ceased to run.

=== Rangiora service ===
The Rangiora suburban was the main suburban service. Locomotive engineers often called it the Rangiora subbies. Morning trains into Christchurch and late-afternoon returns served workers and school pupils, midday trains and the late Friday train served shoppers, and Saturday trains served morning shoppers and sports meetings. By 1953 four to seven trains ran each way from Monday to Saturday.

In October 1943 Sunday trains were introduced, running three times each way. In 1949 an additional weekday morning train was added from Rangiora, which grew from a locomotive and one car-van to five cars. Its fares were about half those of the competing Midland Motorways bus.

Rangiora's council and its mayor repeatedly pressed the railways for a better service, in 1936 asking for later morning departures, in 1944 calling the service poor, and in 1955 asking for the midday trains to be retimed. The railways' traffic manager replied in 1955 that the suburban trains, augmented on Mondays and Fridays by the through expresses, met the area's needs.

Despite the complaints from Rangiora, the service was cut back through the 1950s. In 1956 an evening train from Rangiora and the Saturday afternoon train from Christchurch were cancelled. The midday trains between Christchurch and Rangiora were withdrawn in 1957, and in 1958 the Friday late-evening trains were cancelled, along with an early morning train from Christchurch and the Saturday early morning train from Rangiora.

The cuts were partly reversed in November 1959, when diesel 88-seater railcars took over part of the service and an additional evening railcar was added from Rangiora. The railcars were also used on long-distance services in the South Island, which they were not designed for, and this caused mechanical problems. In June 1967 the Minister of Railways announced their withdrawal, saying that railcar services were losing about £250,000 a year and that the motors needed renewing at an estimated cost of about £1,000,000.

=== Waipara service ===
The Waipara local served the smaller stations beyond Rangiora, stopping at stations and halts on request. It ran Monday to Friday, with a morning train into Christchurch and an evening train to Waipara. The Monday, Wednesday and Friday morning train from Christchurch no longer ran beyond Rangiora from January 1956. In 1959 the railways said that passengers at Balcairn, Sefton and Ashley had no other service, and that the early morning train from Waipara ran in part so that the locomotive and crew could return to Christchurch after taking goods to Waipara for the Waiau branch. In January 1962 the morning passenger train from Waipara to Christchurch was withdrawn and the evening train from Christchurch ran only as far as Rangiora. Buses replaced the Waipara trains, picking up passengers at Amberley, Balcairn, Sefton and Ashley.

== End of the service ==
On 3 July 1967 all railcar and local passenger trains between Christchurch and Rangiora were cancelled and replaced, Monday to Friday, by one pair of trains. They left Rangiora at 7.0 am and Christchurch at 5.10 pm, and stopped at all stations in between. The district traffic manager said that there were not enough passengers to justify two trains a day in each direction.

The last of these trains ran on Friday 30 April 1976. The Minister of Railways, Mr McLachlan, said that average patronage was under 50, and Midland Motorways buses took over. The Rangiora MP, Derek Quigley, said that an average of 75 people had boarded at Rangiora in 1967, falling to 20 in 1975 and 25 in the two weeks ended 13 February 1976. Kaiapoi Borough Council protested against the withdrawal. The Minister replied that the service no longer justified a locomotive, and that the locomotive released from the Christchurch to Rangiora shunting could be used for eight hours a day on more productive work.

=== What became of the trains in the 1953 timetable ===
North Line trains of 1953 and when they were withdrawn
Train	Route	Withdrawn
6:55 am	Rangiora to Christchurch	1967
7:20 am	Rangiora to Christchurch	1976, retimed
7:22 am	Christchurch to Waipara	Cut back to Rangiora in 1956, withdrawn 1958
8:10 am	Waipara to Christchurch	1962
12:10 pm	Christchurch to Rangiora	1957
1:10 pm	Rangiora to Christchurch	1957
4:00 pm (Saturdays)	Christchurch to Rangiora	1956
4:37 pm	Christchurch to Waipara	Cut back to Rangiora in 1962, then 1976, retimed
5:16 pm	Christchurch to Rangiora	1967
5:46 pm	Rangiora to Christchurch	1956
3:00 pm	Christchurch to Belfast	1955
4:38 pm	Belfast to Christchurch	1955
9:20 pm and 10:20 pm (Fridays)	Christchurch to Rangiora and back	1958

== Other services ==
Long-distance trains ran on the Main North Line alongside the local services. They initially ran to Culverden, including the Culverden Express, and later to Parnassus on the Cheviot Branch, which became part of the main line. After the main line was connected through to Marlborough in 1945, the Picton Express began running to Picton in 1946.

== Today ==
Buses serve the Rangiora corridor and cope for most of the day, but peak-time congestion has prompted calls for the North Line to be brought back. In 2025, Environment Canterbury voted to ask KiwiRail to help prepare a business case for a commuter service from Rangiora into Christchurch. The government has also funded a 12-month trial, run by Mainland Rail, with morning and evening services from Rangiora into central Christchurch, due to start in mid-2027.
