= Main North Line =

Main North Line can refer to the following railway lines:

- Main North railway line, New South Wales, Australia
- Main North Line, New Zealand

== See also ==
- North Line (disambiguation)
- North–South line (disambiguation)
- Northern Line (disambiguation)
- Northern Railway (disambiguation)
