= Papanui railway station =

Defunct railway station in New Zealand

Papanui
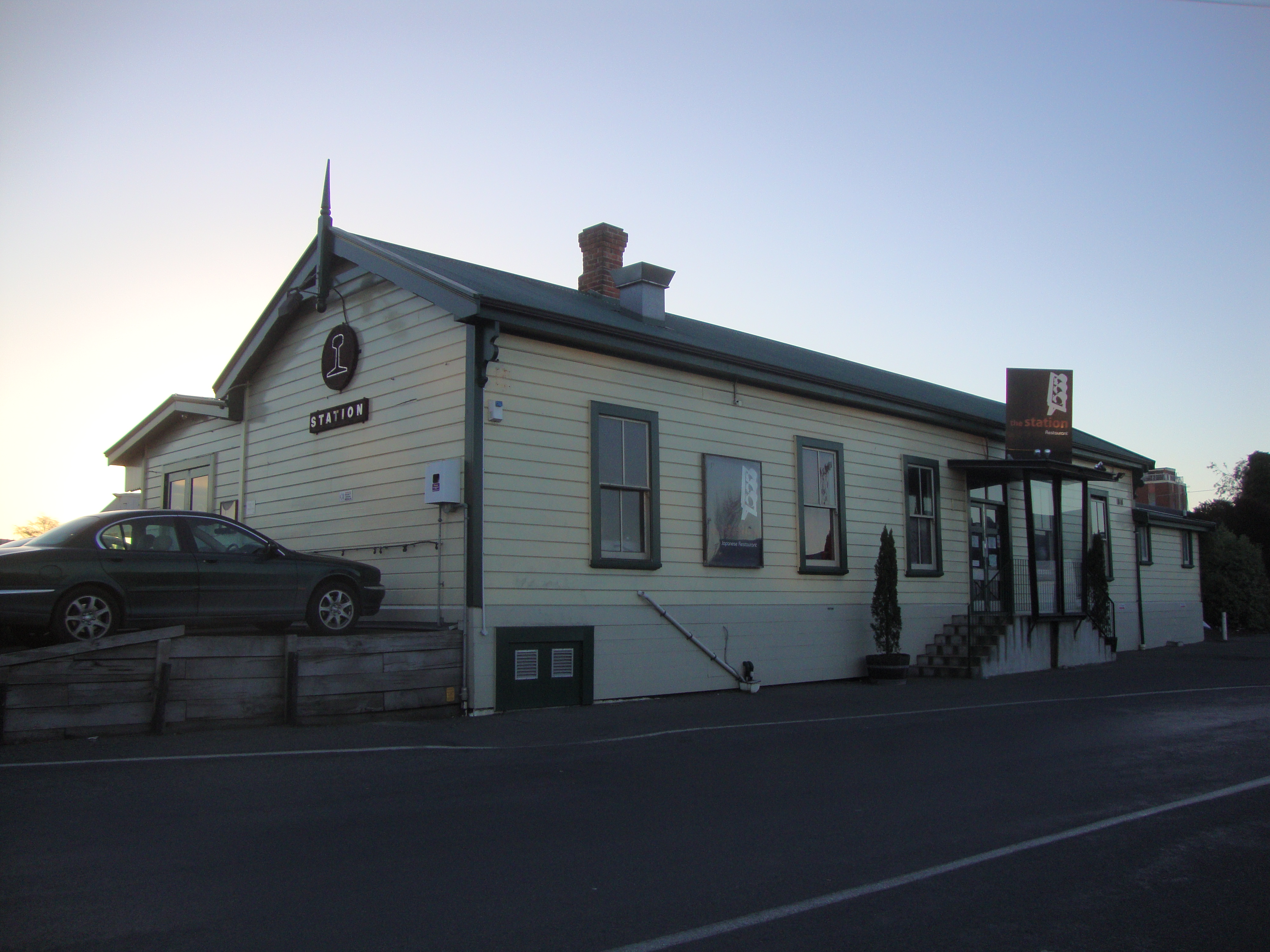

General information
- Location: 1 Restell Street; Papanui; Christchurch; Canterbury; New Zealand
- Coordinates: 43°29′43″S 172°36′22″E
- Elevation: 13 metres (43 ft)
- System: New Zealand Government Railways suburban rail
- Owner: New Zealand Railways Department and successors (1872–1993); Department of Survey and Land Information (1994); Christchurch City Council (1994–)
- Operator: New Zealand Government Railways
- Distance: 5.3 kilometres (3.3 mi) from Addington Junction
- Platforms: single side
- Tracks: main line (single)
- Bus routes: 28 Papanui / Lyttelton and Rapaki; 125 Redwood–Westlake; Or Orbiter
- Bus operators: Go Bus; Red Bus

Construction
- Structure type: at-grade
- Parking: yes

History
- Opened: 29 April 1872
- Closed: 13 October 1986 (freight); 16 June 1991 (all except private sidings)
- Rebuilt: 1900

Key dates
- 20 December 1877: track re-gauged

Services
Preceding station	Historical railways	Following station
Bryndwr; Line open station closed	North Line; NZR	Styx; Line open station closed
Route map
- Diagrams not to scale
Station yard layout
Tram interchange c. 1900
Location

Papanui railway station served the suburb of Papanui in northern Christchurch, New Zealand. It was on the Main North Line between the stations of Bryndwr (to the south) and Styx (to the north), 5.3 kilometres (3.3 mi) north of Addington Junction. The station handled freight and passenger traffic from when it opened in 1872 until closing in the late 20th century, and from 1880 was the site of an interchange between passenger rail and trams until the 1930s.

The station building remains and is currently tenanted by a restaurant. There have been proposals for the reinstatement of commuter rail services on the Main North Line that would involve the use of Papanui but thus far, none has been approved.

== History ==
=== Operations ===
==== Early years (1872–1880) ====
Construction of the Main North Line, as far as Rangiora, was authorised by the Railways Act (1870). On 29 April 1872, the line opened to Kaiapoi with a test train from Christchurch in the morning, followed later that day by the official train. This latter train stopped at Papanui station where various dignitaries regaled the waiting crowd with speeches before the train moved on.

It was not until the line opened to Rangiora on 5 November 1872 that regular train services ran on the Main North Line. These started with a thrice-daily mixed train. With the opening of the line to Amberley in 1876, services were enhanced to provide two passenger and one mixed trains per day. Some years later, night trains commenced operation on this section.

The decision to construct the Christchurch–Amberley line to the Canterbury Provincial Railways 5 ft 3 in (1,600 mm) broad gauge standard caused considerable expense of time and cost such that in 1877 it was decided to convert the line to the national standard 3 ft 6 in (1,067 mm) narrow gauge. This took place on 20 December 1877 when the line temporarily closed following several days of preparation. Coaches provided a replacement service for passengers and mail, and the following morning the line reopened.

==== Tram interchange (1880–1934) ====
The Canterbury Tramway Company opened its Papanui tramline on 24 June 1880 that included a short spur along Harewood Road to a terminus behind the Papanui railway station. Here, it also constructed a shed to stable tramcars. As it had several months earlier also opened a line from Cathedral Square to the Christchurch railway station on Moorhouse Avenue, it was able to offer its own service between the two railway stations, competing with the trains provided by the Railways Department. Tram services were timed to meet trains on the Main North Line as well as for passengers from the Waiau and Oxford branches. Trams were steam-hauled, but in 1893, the company got into financial difficulty and was liquidated. The Christchurch Tramway Company assumed control of its operations and proceeded to phase out the steam motors in favour of horse-drawn services.

The Christchurch Tramway Board acquired the Papanui tramline and upgraded it for electric running. The line officially reopened on 5 June 1905, coinciding with the commencement of electric tram services in Christchurch. The concession by which trams were able to enter land at Papanui railway station had been issued to the Canterbury Tramway Company. When the Tramway Board assimilated the service, a dispute arose with the Railways Department, which refused to transfer the concession to the Board. An agreement reached in 1906 granted right-of-entry to the Board until 1926 for an annual payment of £5.

A further dispute arose in 1916 when the Board wanted to extend its line to accommodate larger trailers. The matter was resolved when the Board had land it used at the entrance to the Papanui station yard vested as part of a public road.

When the concession came up for renewal in 1926, the Railways Department offered an indefinite extension, which the Board accepted. However, by 1930 patronage of the service to the railway station had dropped to levels that were no longer commercially viable. With the onset of the Great Depression, the Board sought ways to save on costs, and considered the possibility of discontinuing the Papanui railway station connection. In 1932 the matter was examined and a passenger count revealed that an average of 96 passengers used 76 trips to the station weekly, but the Boards costs for providing this service were not passed on to the passengers (no extra was charged for going to the railway station vs. Papanui). It therefore decided to terminate services at the Papanui Township. This concerned the Railways Department to the extent that they waived the annual fee for use of their land at the railway station to keep the service going. Use of the railway station service continued to decline to the point where passengers had almost completely abandoned it, and a new timetable introduced on 16 April 1934 for the Papanui tramline eliminated the railway station extension.

The track for the spur remained in place until the line closed in 1954. It occasionally used to store trailers once closed to passenger services. After the tram tracks were lifted, the tramway reserve, which had become known as Station Road, was sealed by the Christchurch City Council and thereafter used as a public thoroughfare even though ownership of much of the land remained with the Railways Department for several more decades.

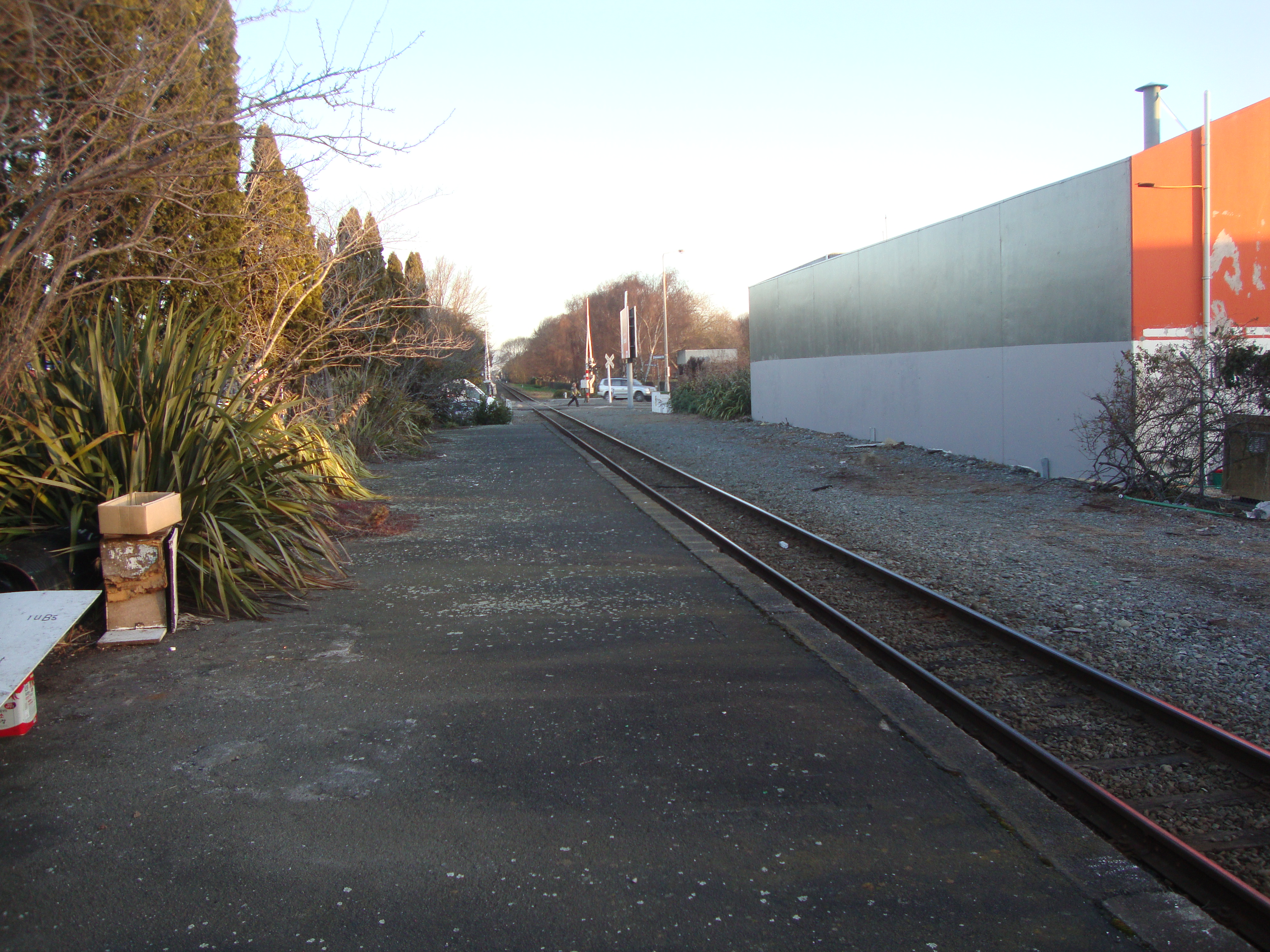
Looking towards the Harewood Road level crossing

==== Heyday (1880–1956) ====
The growing population served by the line in Christchurch and its satellite towns through which the line ran led to an increasing number of services provided to the likes of Papanui. By 1916, there were two passenger and three mixed trains passing through Papanui daily making return trips between Christchurch and Rangiora. This had improved to five passenger and one mixed return trains by 1927 with an additional midday battery-electric railcar service. Four southbound and five northbound passenger trains are listed on the 1943 timetable running every weekday between Christchurch and Rangiora, with a fifth early-morning southbound service added in 1949.

Though these passenger trains were officially designated a suburban service (Christchurch–Rangiora), their frequency never approached that of the passenger service provided on the Lyttelton Line, but were timed to meet the needs of commuters and casual travellers heading into Christchurch from the outlying towns. They provided a popular service that competed favourably with the rival, but more expensive, bus service from Midland Motorways. At their peak, there were as many as 10–12 passenger or mixed trains daily.

==== Halcyon years (1956–1991) ====
The decline of the passenger service started in 1956 when the number of trains dropped to three daily return runs, one of which was provided by a pair of twinset railcars. On 27 March 1957, the midday train was cancelled. A decade later, locomotive-hauled carriage trains replaced the railcars on 3 July 1967, at which time the number of services dropped further to just one daily return train.

Diesel-electric motive power replaced steam but it was not enough to arrest the falling popularity of the passenger services. The end came on 30 April 1976, by which time the train was often failing to attract a sufficient number of passengers for the two carriages then attached to the trains. Thereafter the only passenger trains to regularly pass through Papanui were the long-haul Picton carriage trains, sometimes called the Picton Express (which stopped at Papanui), latterly and variously known as the Coastal Pacific and the TranzCoastal from 25 September 1988.

Papanui stopped accepting general goods consignments on 13 October 1986 and was thereafter designated a Special Purpose Freight Terminal for the handling of private siding traffic. It was noted at the time the types of freight handled through Papanui as coal and tyres with private siding customers being Thomas Brown (a coal merchant), Sanitarium Health Foods, and Firestone Tire and Rubber but that Sanitarium's siding was due to close.

==== Demise and disposition ====
After closing in June 1991, the station building remained vacant for several years. The Christchurch City Council agreed in late 1993 to purchase the station building as part of a deal to acquire land for road purposes to extend Restell Street. Surplus railway land at Papanui was transferred to the Department of Survey and Land Information on 1 January 1994 for disposal purposes.

Having acquired the property in 1994, the Council rejected proposals to either relocate or demolish the building and, after some initial difficulty, was eventually able to find a commercial tenant.

=== Facilities ===
==== Goods shed ====
A suspected arson damaged the goods shed in February 1984. An assessment of the damage revealed that the repair cost exceeded the shed's insured value and as the only user of the shed at the time was Firestone, it was decided to demolish rather than reinstate it. The remainder of the shed sold for removal on 13 June 1984 with the work completed in August.

==== Loading bank and stockyard ====
A loading bank was located behind the goods shed. Despite numerous requests, Papanui never had stock and cattle yards provided, as it was felt that the amount of this traffic through Papanui was never sufficient to justify the cost of installing them and that suitable loading facilities were available at Addington and Chaneys.

==== Sidings ====
Private sidings were in use at Papanui to serve neighbouring industrial customers including:

- Firestone Tyre Company, 1948–?.
- Sanitarium Health Food Company, 1923–1986?.
- Borgfeldt's, 1882–1916; Frank Drury & Sons (blacksmith), 1916–29 February 1972; Thomas Brown (coal merchant), 1972–?. Siding had fallen into disuse by 1980.

The Sanitarium factory remains open but the Firestone factory closed in 2009.

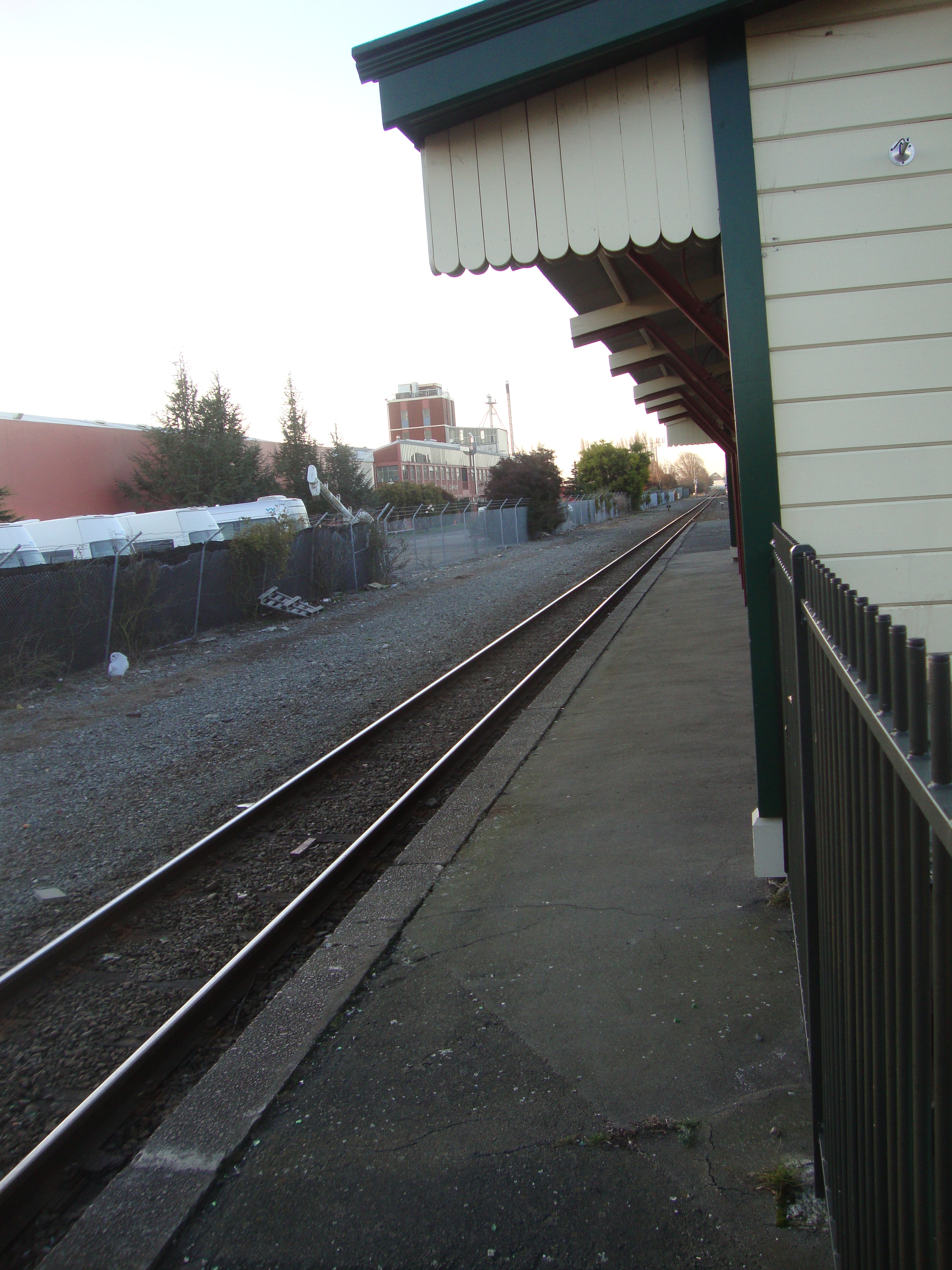
Station platform with Sanitarium factory and Langdons Road level crossing in the background

==== Station building & platform ====
The original station had a wooden platform and a station building that while lacking in passenger amenities was considered adequate for the business conducted there. In response to a petition in 1899 calling for improvements to the station, the building was described as being "not of modern type" but that though there was considerable passenger business, because most of the passengers arrived at or departed from the station by tram, a new station building was not warranted at the time. However, a new station building with veranda was approved and constructed the following year. The Post Office, which had been conducting its business from Papanui Station, relocated to its own building, as they were not accommodated in the new station building.

An extension of the platform from 200 feet (61 m) to 500 feet (150 m) was approved in 1903. It was determined that in order to extend the platform as planned, that the tramway company's concession to enter the station yard would have to be extinguished. As the Tramway Board had been formed and was in the process of acquiring the private tramway companies and notice was required to terminate the concession, the Railways Department issued notice in 1904 for revocation of the concession.

The platform was reduced in length to 135 metres (443 ft) in 1977.

On 20 February 1998, the New Zealand Historic Places Trust (since renamed to Heritage New Zealand) registered the station building as a Category II structure with registration number 7415. It was designed by New Zealand Railways during a time when George Troup was Head Draftsman as a representative example of either a Troup Type C station building, or a prototype of a Troup Period B & C Type station.

== Proposals ==
=== Double tracking ===
In the 1940s, there was a proposal to duplicate the track on the Main North Line between Addington and Rangiora to relieve rail traffic congestion. In line with the general practice in the North Island where a line was double-tracked, the Railways Department planned for an island platform to allow for passenger trains from either direction to stop at the station. Even without the double tracking of the Main North Line, the Department considered that an island platform at Papanui was still useful for the crossing of passenger trains there.

The Capital Estimates for 1943/1944 made an allowance for the construction of an island platform and new station building as the old building was unsuitable for an island platform. This provision continued to appear in the Capital Estimates as late as 1946/1947. The Railways Department eventually decided not to proceed with the double tracking or the island platform.

=== Sockburn–Styx deviation ===
Some proposals for the defunct Sockburn–Styx deviation project called for the section of the Main North Line bypassed by the deviation to be closed and lifted. However, Papanui railway station at the time was important enough (more so for goods traffic) that a spur of the Main North Line at the north end of this section would have remained in use to continue to serve Papanui station.

=== Christchurch commuter rail revival ===
Since the cessation of the Christchurch–Rangiora commuter service in 1976, the possibility of reviving a passenger rail service for Christchurch has been the subject of several reports. The two most recent reports are the Proposed Introduction of Commuter Rail Services to Christchurch City and Environs (2005) and the Greater Christchurch Northern Rail – Rapid Assessment (2014).

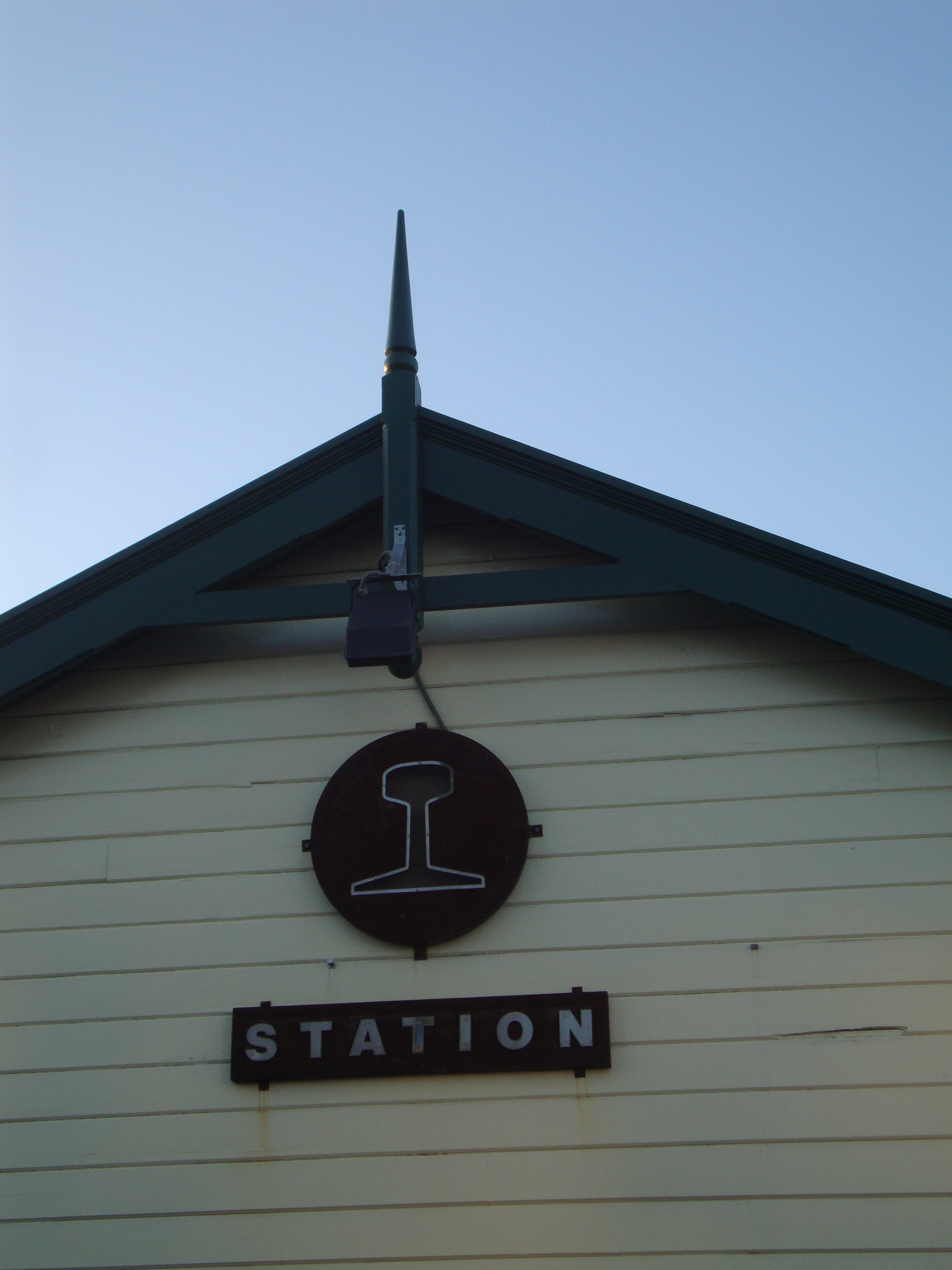
Sign detail.

==== Proposed introduction of commuter rail services to Christchurch City and environs ====
A report commissioned by Environment Canterbury and released on 23 June 2005, it examines several options for establishing new passenger rail services for Christchurch. It covers the possibility of services to three main termini: Lyttelton, Rolleston, and Rangiora. The report states that a more detailed study would be required to determine the number and location of stations to serve the needs of potential users of the service. Options 2 thru 5 would have involved double tracking and resignalling through Papanui.

==== Greater Christchurch Northern Rail – rapid assessment ====
In response to severe traffic congestion experienced by commuters from the Waimakariri District heading into Christchurch following the earthquakes of 2010–2011, Environment Canterbury commissioned the Greater Christchurch Northern Rail – Rapid Assessment to examine the possibility of a temporary passenger rail service between Rangiora and Christchurch. Released on 17 July 2014, the aim of the report was to determine if existing rail facilities and equipment could be used, for low cost, to run a peak-time commuter service to relieve pressure on the road network until mitigation works could be completed to improve road capacity. It concluded that, while the best option for providing such a service would be one that ran from Rangiora to Addington with stops at Kaiapoi and Papanui and had connecting bus services, given the narrow and specific scope of a temporary service, it was too risky and could not be justified.

Section 4.1 on station facilities mentions that Papanui station's platform could be resurfaced to provide an adequate facility for a passenger rail service for an indicative cost of $22,725. The report also notes signalling issues, in that trains stopping at Papanui would activate level crossing alarms on Harewood Road or Langdons Road for the duration of the stop.

The Government concurred with the report's findings and declined to proceed with the project.

== Today ==
The only significant railway facilities remaining at the site are the station building and its platform. Since the closure of the station, various commercial enterprises have leased the building, most recently by a restaurant that is currently operating there.

There is a railway carriage on static display at the north end of the station platform on loan from the Canterbury Railway Society.

== See also ==
- List of Christchurch railway stations
