= North Line =

North Line may refer to:

== Transportation ==
=== Asia ===
- North Line, Chennai Suburban, India
- North-Link Line, Taiwan
- West North Line, Chennai Suburban, India

=== Europe ===
- Far North Line, Scotland
- Gjøvik Line, Norway
- Nordbanen, Denmark

=== North America ===
- Milwaukee District North Line, Illinois, United States
- North Line (METRORail), Houston, Texas, United States
- Sounder North Line, Washington, United States
- Union Pacific North Line, Illinois, United States

=== Oceania ===
- North Line, Christchurch, New Zealand

== See also ==
- Northern Line (disambiguation)
- Northern Railway (disambiguation)
- Main North Line (disambiguation)
- North–South line (disambiguation)
