= Great Northern Railway =

Great Northern Railway or Great Northern Railroad may refer to:

== Australia ==
- Great Northern Railway (Queensland)
- Great Northern Rail Services in Victoria
- Central Australia Railway was known as the great Northern Railway in the 1890s in South Australia
- Main Northern railway line, New South Wales

== Canada ==
- Great Northern Railway of Canada

== Ireland ==
- Great Northern Railway (Ireland)

== New Zealand ==
- Kingston Branch (New Zealand) in Southland
- Main North Line, New Zealand and Waiau Branch in Canterbury

== United Kingdom ==
- Great Northern Railway (Great Britain)
  - East Coast Main Line, the main line of the railway
  - London and North Eastern Railway, which the GNR was merged into
- Great Northern route, the suburban services on the southern East Coast Main Line and its branches
  - West Anglia Great Northern, a former operator of this route
  - First Capital Connect, a former operator of this route
  - Govia Thameslink Railway, a former operator of this route under the brand 'Great Northern'
  - Greater Thameslink Railway, the current operator of this route under the brand 'Great Northern'

== United States ==
- Beaumont and Great Northern Railroad, predecessor of the Waco, Beaumont, Trinity and Sabine Railway, a defunct Texas shortline
- Great Northern Railway (U.S.), part of the BNSF Railway system
- Houston and Great Northern Railroad in Texas, a predecessor of the International – Great Northern Railroad
- International–Great Northern Railroad in Texas, part of the Union Pacific Railroad
- New Orleans, Jackson and Great Northern in Louisiana and Mississippi, part of the Canadian National Railway (freight transport) and Amtrak (passenger service) systems
- Paris and Great Northern Railroad in Texas, merged into the St. Louis–San Francisco Railway, now part of the Kiamichi Railroad
- Wisconsin Great Northern Railroad, operating in Wisconsin since 1997

== See also ==
- Northern (disambiguation)
- Great Northern (disambiguation)
- Northern Railway (disambiguation)
