= Riccarton railway station =

Former railway station in Christchurch, New Zealand

Riccarton
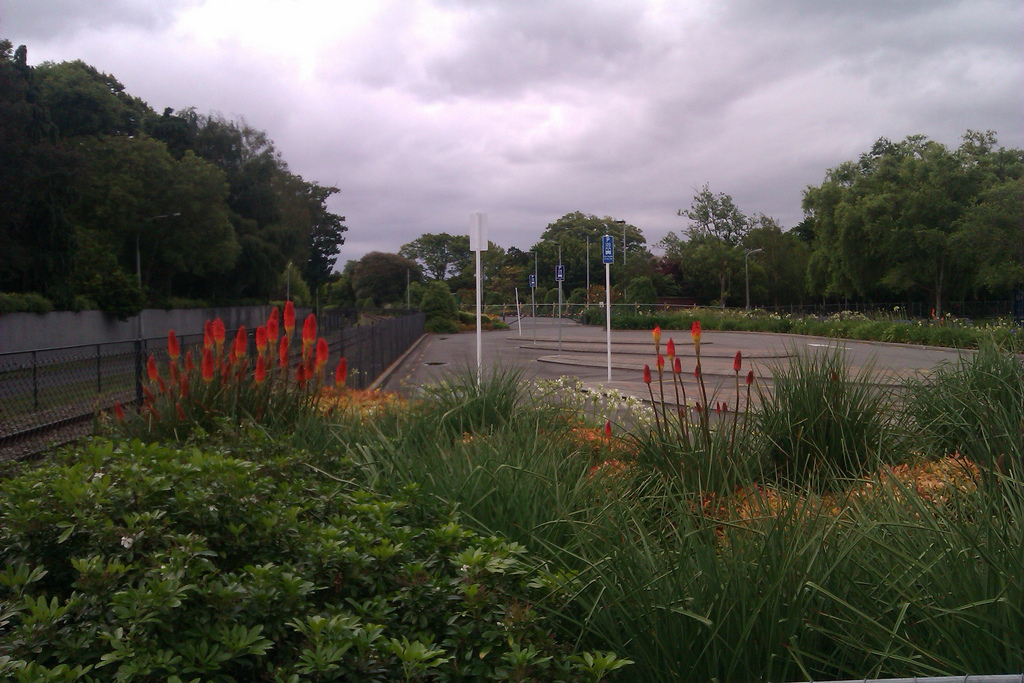
- The site of the station, now bus bays at Mona Vale

General information
- Location: Riccarton, Christchurch
- Coordinates: 43°31′29.1″S 172°36′28.6″E
- Owner: New Zealand Railways Department
- Line: Main North Line
- Distance: 2.3 km from the Addington junction
- Platforms: 1 side platform
- Tracks: 3

History
- Opened: 29 April 1872
- Closed: 2 July 1977

Services
Preceding station	Historical railways	Following station
Addington; Line open station closed	North Line; NZR	Bryndwr; Line open station closed
Location

Riccarton railway station was a station on the Main North Line in Riccarton, a suburb of Christchurch, New Zealand. It was served by suburban trains on the North Line between Christchurch and Rangiora, and it had a freight yard and a siding to a flour mill. In 1905 a temporary line from the station carried materials and exhibits to the International Exhibition in Hagley Park. The station opened in 1872 and closed in 1977.

== Location ==
The station stood on the Main North Line just north of the Kilmarnock Street crossing, between Addington and Papanui. The station building was to the west of the line. The station had a side platform, the main line, a passing loop and a siding. The southern part of the yard lay across Matai Street. The street's crossing of the railway was later closed to road traffic, and today only a cycleway crosses the line there. The Uni-Cycle cycleway also crosses the former railway corridor.

== History ==
=== Opening ===
The station opened on 29 April 1872, when the Main North Line was extended north from Christchurch. The name Riccarton had earlier belonged to a station on the Main South Line, which was renamed Middleton in November 1871.

=== The station and its yard ===
Riccarton was a goods station as well as a passenger stop. In 1923 the station's facilities were not keeping up with its business: most of the timber and coal for the merchants of Papanui Road passed through it, and 30 to 40 trucks were often waiting in the yard. The borough council asked for a carriers' loading dock, because carriers had to take sacks and parcels across the line between trucks. The yard had a shunting yard and semaphore signals by 1947, when a power cut forced shunters to work by oil lamp.

A private siding ran from the yard to the Riccarton Mills, a flour mill on the Avon on the site later used for Christchurch Girls' High School. It allowed grain to be delivered and flour loaded directly into railway trucks. The mill was damaged by fire in 1971 and demolished in 1974.

=== International Exhibition branch ===
In late 1905 a temporary line was built from the station to the site of the International Exhibition, which was being built in Hagley Park. The Government built a siding about 90 chains long that joined the main line at Riccarton, with a loop for shunting. Trucks carried timber for the exhibition buildings along it within weeks of construction starting. The line was for exhibits and building materials, and the passenger terminus for visitors was to be the Christchurch station. The contractors, J. and J. W. Jameson, began the work by laying the line from Riccarton station across the park to the site, and it carried building materials first and later exhibits from all over New Zealand and overseas. The exhibition ran from November 1906 to April 1907. The branch closed in April 1908.

=== Suburban trains ===
Riccarton was a stop on the Rangiora suburban trains. In 1953 most of the trains between Christchurch and Rangiora called there only if required. The service was cut back over the following decades, to a single return train a day in July 1967, and it ended in April 1976. The station is listed as closing in July 1977.

=== Station gardens and the building ===
The station's garden won the railway station gardens competition of the Canterbury Horticultural Society in 1961, 1963 and 1964.

By December 1975 the station was no longer attended, and it served as a shelter for the few passengers using the trains to Kaiapoi and Rangiora. The small station building was of unusual design and had been damaged by vandals. A resident asked Riccarton Borough Council to preserve it, and a suggestion was to be made to the Ferrymead Trust that it might be moved to the trust's line at Ferrymead. The railways said it would be demolished or offered for sale once it was surplus.

== After closure ==
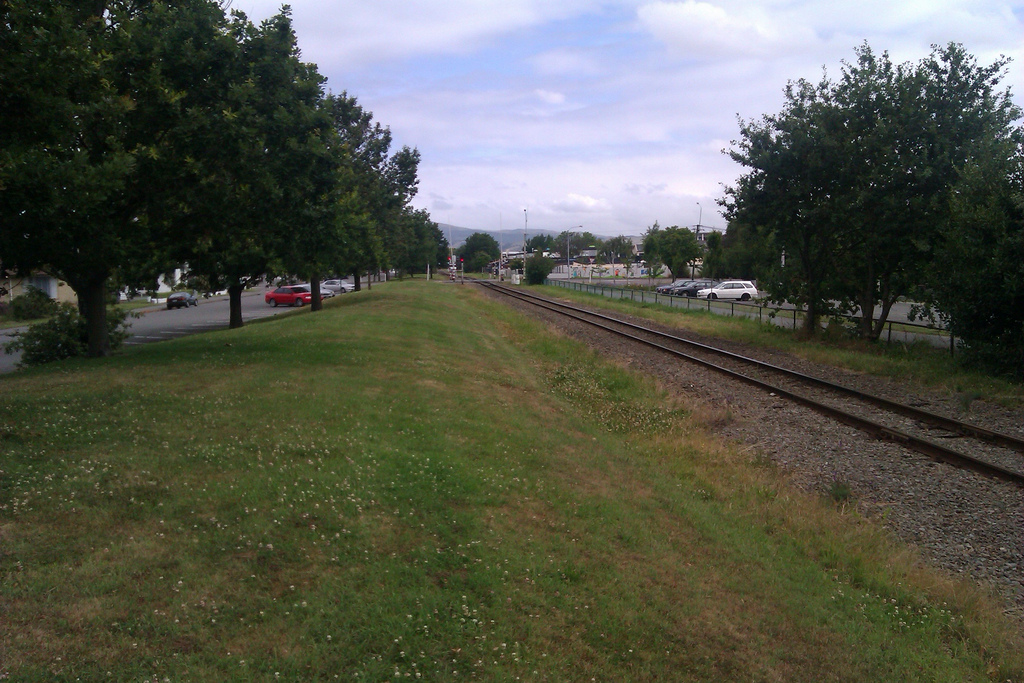
The railway looking south from the former yard

In 1990 and 1991 the site was proposed for Christchurch's new passenger station, when the Moorhouse Avenue station was being sold. The proposal was a site near the old Riccarton station and the Mona Vale homestead, and the station building from Kaiapoi was one idea for it. Residents opposed it, and the station was built at Addington instead after New Zealand Rail decided that the Riccarton site was too small.

== Today ==
Part of the former yard is now the bus bays at Mona Vale park.

A 2017 proposal for commuter trains from the Waimakariri and Selwyn districts included a station at Riccarton on its map.
