= Nordbahn =

Nordbahn (German: Northern Railway) may refer to:

- Berlin Northern Railway (Berliner Nordbahn), a railway line in Germany
- Friedrich-Wilhelms-Nordbahn, another railway line in Germany
- Nordbahn Eisenbahngesellschaft, a railway company based in Hamburg, Germany
- North railway (Austria) (Nordbahn), a railway line in Austria and the Czech Republic
- Pfälzische Nordbahn, a railway line in Rhineland-Palatinate, Germany
- Swiss Northern Railway, (Schweizerische Nordbahn, SNB). a one time Swiss railway

== See also ==
- Northern Railway (disambiguation)
