= Northern Railroad =

Northern Railroad may refer to one of the following defunct American railroads:

- Northern Railroad (New Hampshire) (1847–1890), predecessor of the Boston and Maine Railroad
  - Northern Rail Trail, a rail trail along the route of the Northern Railroad in New Hampshire
- Northern Railroad (New York) (1845–1865), predecessor of the Rutland Railroad
- Northern Railroad of New Jersey (1859–1866), predecessor of the Erie Railroad

== See also ==
- Northern Railway (disambiguation)
