= Rangiora railway station =

Railway station in Rangiora, New Zealand

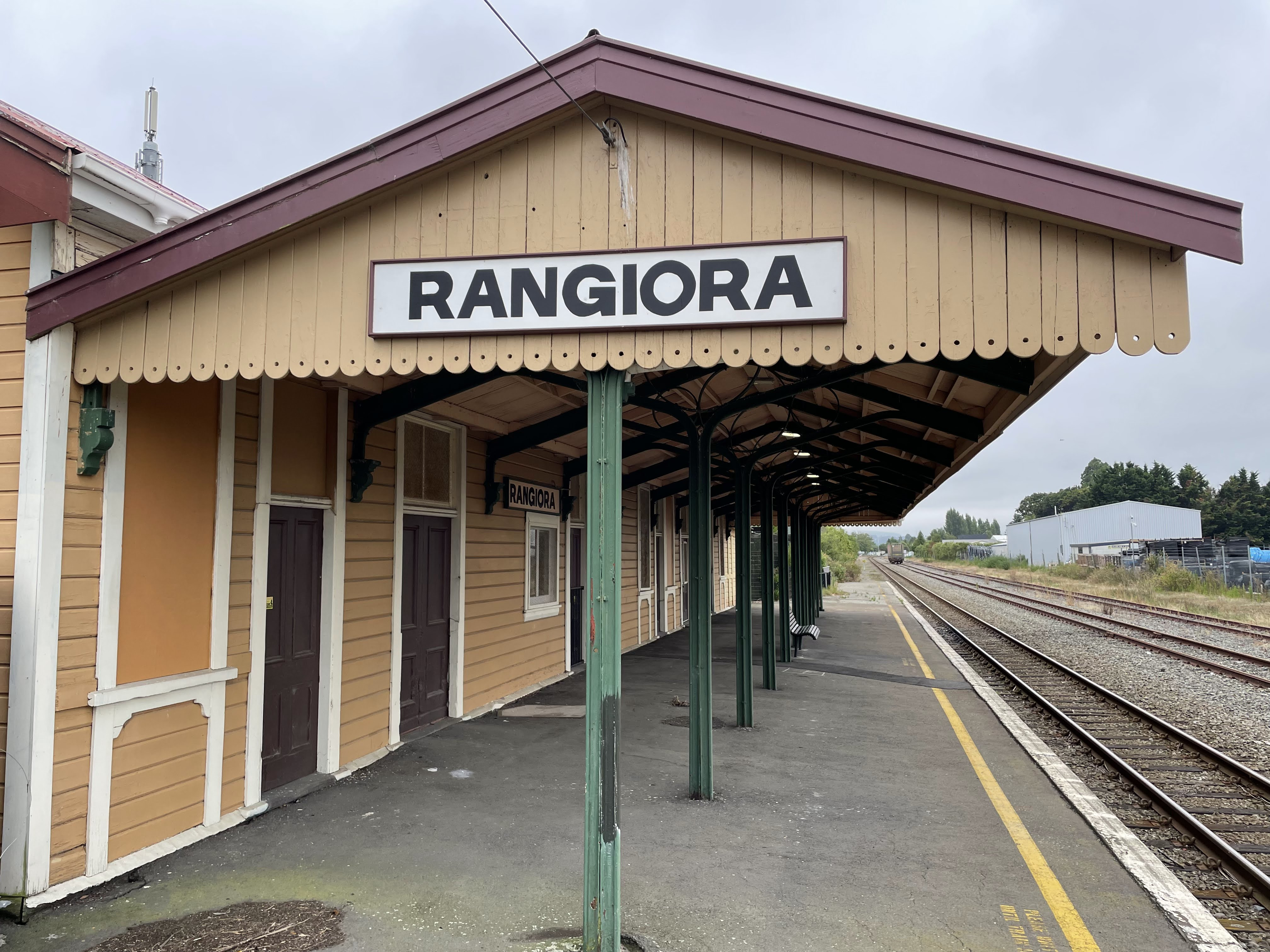
- Rangiora railway station

General information
- Location: Rangiora; New Zealand
- Coordinates: 43.300289°S 172.597533°E
- Line: Main North Line
- Distance: Christchurch 30.11 km (18.71 mi)
- Platforms: 1
- Tracks: 2

History
- Opened: 5 November 1872
- Rebuilt: 1909

Services
Preceding station	Great Journeys New Zealand	Following station
Christchurch Terminus	Coastal Pacific	Kaikōura towards Picton

Historic railways
Preceding station	Historical railways	Following station
Southbrook; Line open station closed	Flaxton; Line open station closed	Ashley; Line open station closed
Terminus	Oxford Branch; NZR	Bells; Line closed station closed
Location

Rangiora railway station is a station on the Main North Line in Rangiora, north of Christchurch, New Zealand. It opened on 5 November 1872 and was the junction for the Oxford Branch. The station building, designed by George Troup and built in 1909, closed as a railway station in 1988 and is now a cafe called The Station. Trains still stop at the station, which is served by the Coastal Pacific.

== History ==
=== Opening ===
The line from Christchurch reached Southbrook in July 1872. The extension to Rangiora was delayed by a shortage of rail chairs, and the opening of the line to Rangiora was celebrated on 5 November 1872. Rangiora was the northern terminus until the line was extended across the Ashley River to Balcairn on 3 November 1875. The line was built to the broad gauge of 5 ft 3 in and was converted to narrow gauge 3 ft 6 in (1,070 mm) in 1878.

=== Junction station ===
The first station was built around the time of the opening. It was a wood and iron building with a public lobby, a ladies' waiting room, a luggage room, a stationmaster's room and an office for the inspector of permanent way. It was a junction station, built across the angle between the main line and the Oxford Branch, with a platform at each end. By about 1900 the first station stood between the main line and the branch, at right angles to the present station. The Oxford Branch opened from Rangiora to Cust on 1 December 1874 and to Oxford in June 1875, and the Eyreton Branch from Kaiapoi joined it at Bennetts Junction. Branch trains used their own platform at Rangiora, where the layout was a triangle junction like the one at Frankton in Hamilton.

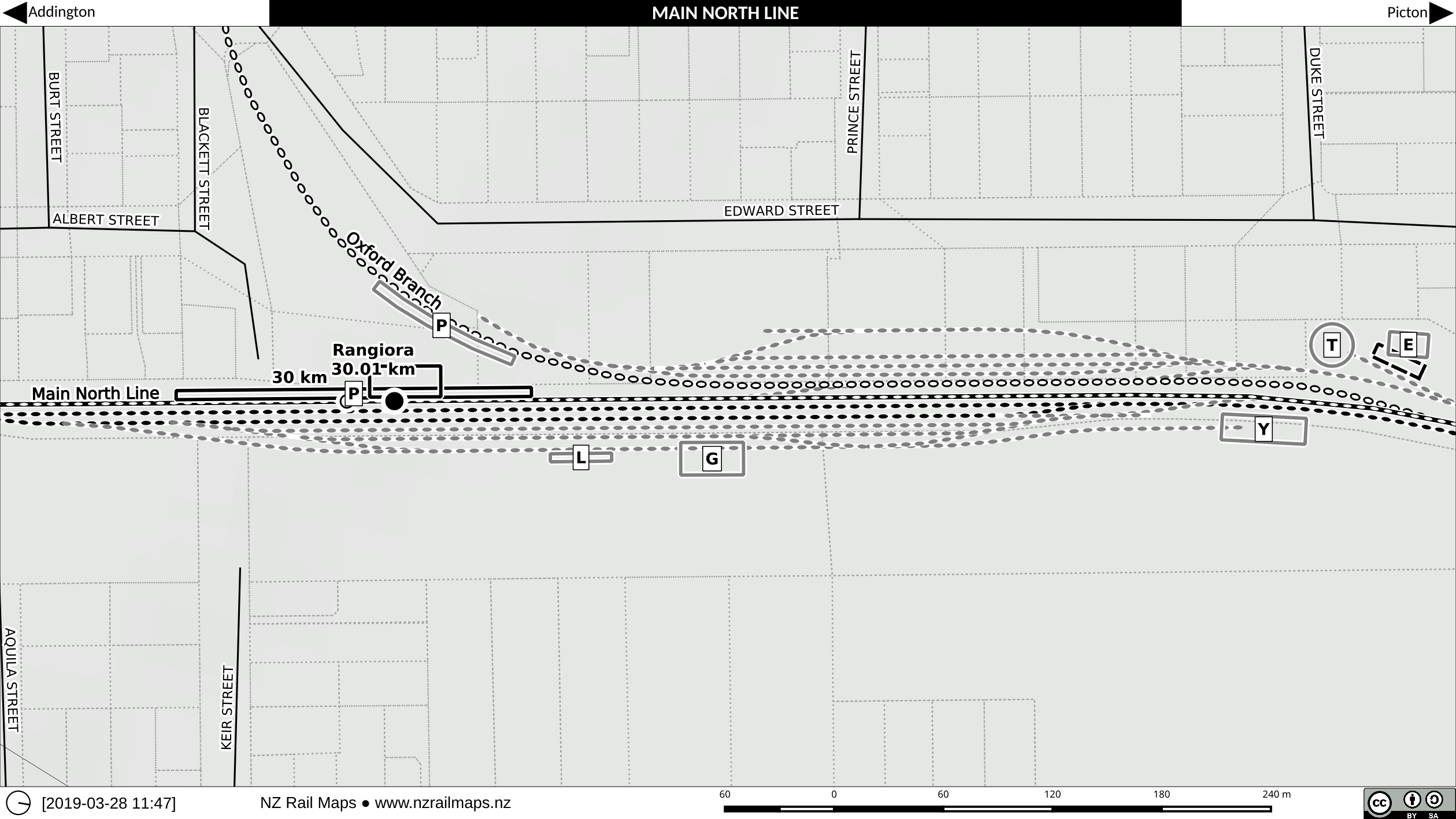
Diagram of the historical layout of Rangiora station

The branches needed a locomotive depot at Rangiora, and the turntable at the north end of the yard remained into the 1970s. A refreshment room, a small wooden shed with a platform counter on the south side of the station, opened in 1883 and closed in the 1930s. A new galvanised iron goods shed with a concrete foundation replaced the old one in late 1938 and early 1939.

=== Troup station ===
The Minister of Railways approved a new station for Rangiora early in 1908, and it was built in 1909 to a design by George Troup, who also designed Kaiapoi. The General Manager of New Zealand Railways, T. O. Ronayne, asked for a building similar to Kaiapoi's but with less ornamentation, and the cost was estimated at £1,400. The building has verandah supports and decoration made of railway iron, and it was originally roofed with Marseilles tiles.

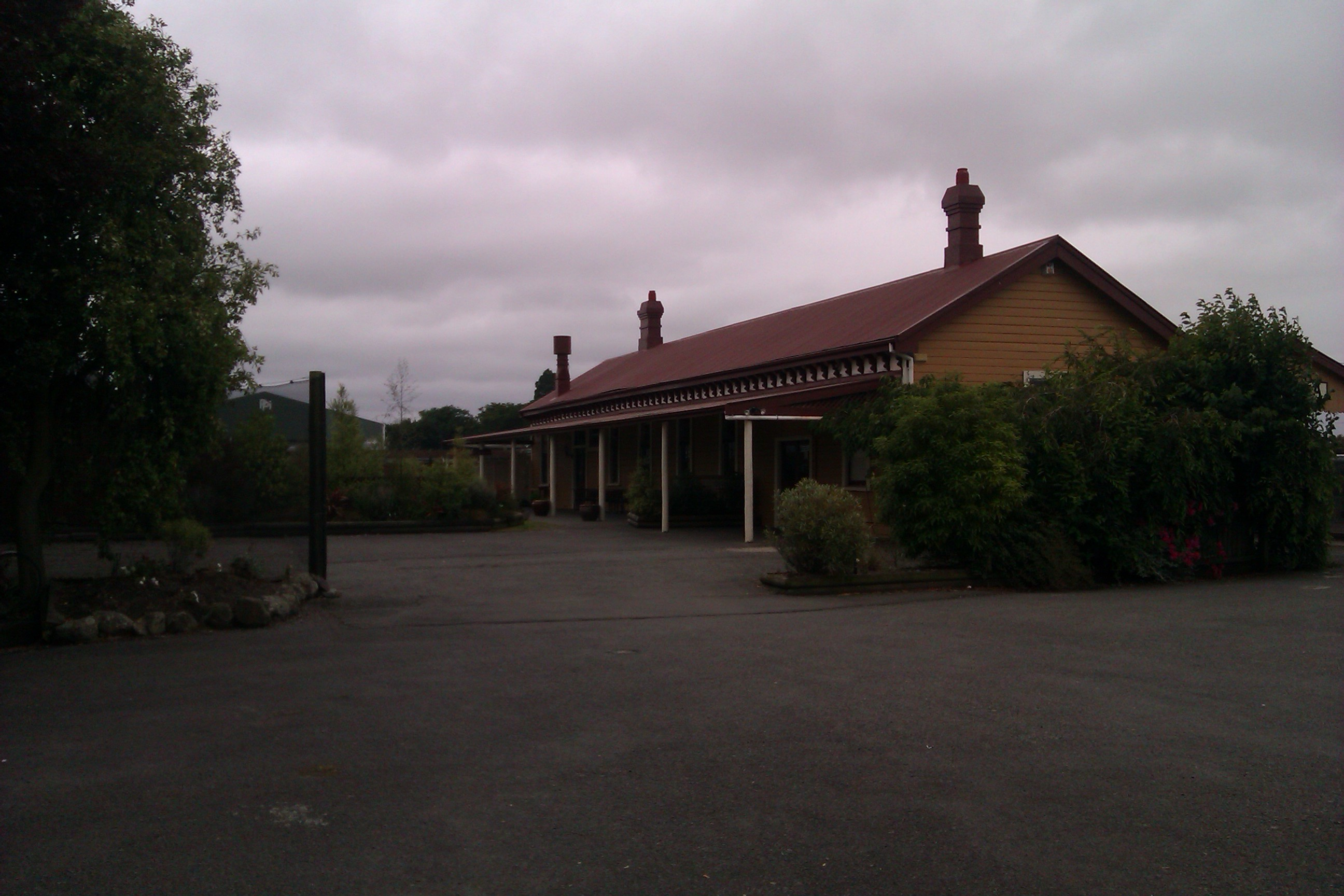
The front of the station building, now The Station cafe

The station was built in an L-shape. In 1948 the parcels office was subdivided into a storeroom, a parcels office and a cloakroom, at a cost of £443. By 1977 the tile roof needed replacing, and the cheaper option of corrugated iron was chosen. The extension that held the women's and men's toilets and other offices has since been lost, and the building now comprises the former stationmaster's office, the waiting rooms and the lobby.

==== Staffing and signalling ====
Signalling staff remained at Rangiora until March 1991, when a new train signalling system ended the jobs of the two men who signalled trains there. At the time it left no staffed stations between Belfast and Kaikōura, but passengers could still board and leave trains at Rangiora, and drivers had written instructions to allow this.

== Services ==
Suburban trains ran between Rangiora and Christchurch until 30 April 1976, when the workers' trains, the 6.55 a.m. from Rangiora and the 5.10 p.m. from Christchurch, made their last runs. The Minister of Railways gave average patronage of under 50 as the reason, and Midland Motorways buses replaced them.

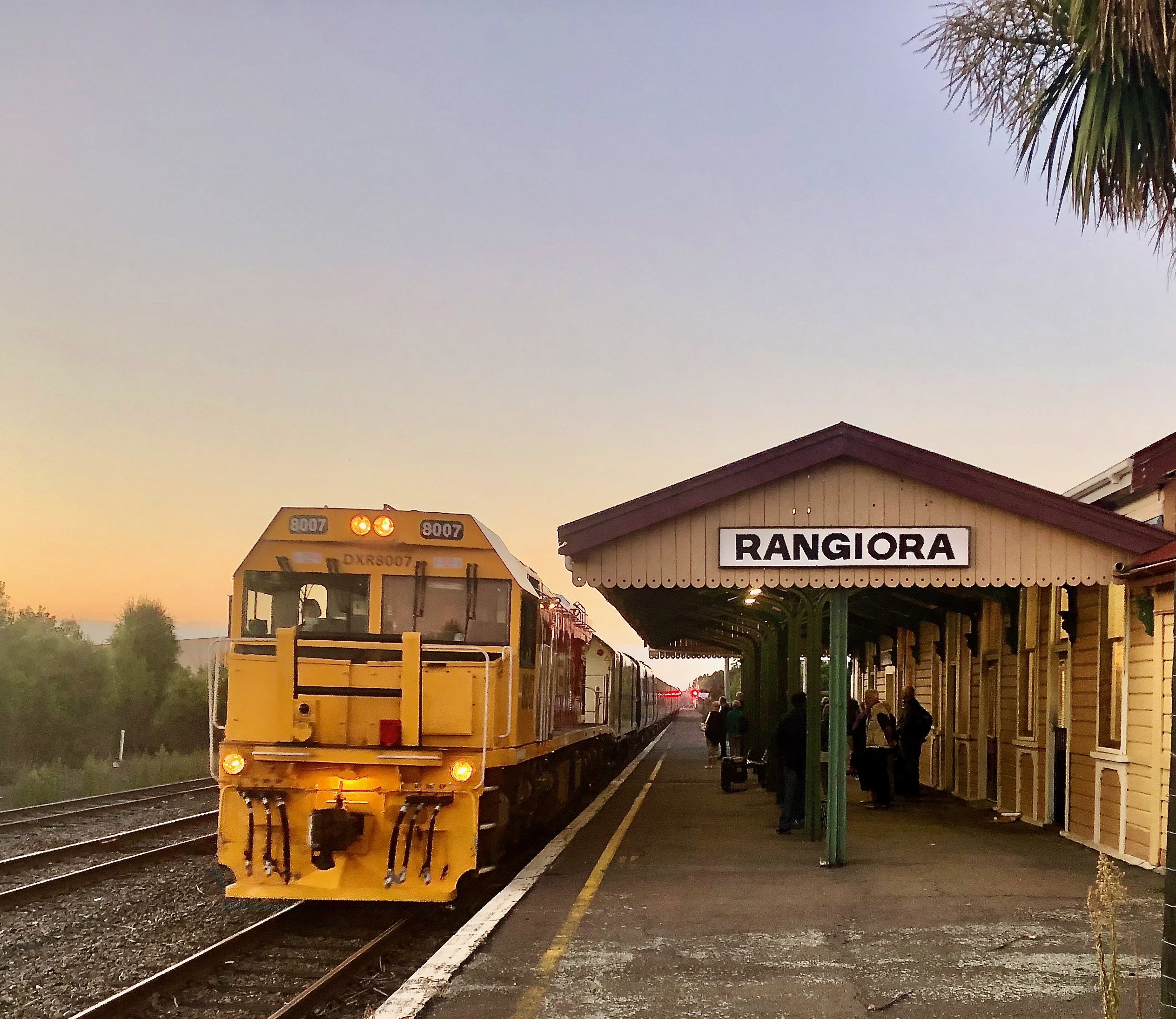
A DXR class locomotive heading the northbound Coastal Pacific at Rangiora in 2021

Passenger services between Christchurch, Rangiora and Picton were mainly worked by Vulcan railcars until 1978, when locomotive-hauled trains replaced them. The Coastal Pacific between Christchurch and Picton stops at Rangiora. The service is seasonal, running daily in spring, summer and autumn.

== Station today ==
The station building closed as a railway station in 1988. It has housed cafes and a garden centre since, and is now a cafe called The Station. The station has a single platform on the main track, with a loop beside it and a set of sidings. Mainland Rail stored some of its vehicles in the sidings for a time over the 2025–26 summer. Most of the former sidings, including private spurs on the west side, have gone.

== Future ==
In May 2025 Environment Canterbury voted to ask KiwiRail to help prepare a business case for a commuter train from Rangiora and Rolleston into Christchurch. The Government has since announced funding for a 12-month trial run by Mainland Rail, with morning and evening services between Rangiora, Rolleston and central Christchurch, starting in mid-2027. In 2026 Mainland Rail also ran the Crusaders Express fan train from Rangiora and Rolleston to Crusaders home games.

== See also ==
- Oxford Branch
- Eyreton Branch
