= Great Northern =

Great Northern may refer to:

== Hotels ==
- Great Northern Hotel, Townsville, in Queensland, Australia
- Great Northern Hotel (Chicago), in Chicago, USA
- Great Northern Hotel, Newcastle, in Newcastle, New South Wales, Australia
- The Great Northern Hotel, in the fictional town in the television series Twin Peaks

== Transport ==
- Great Northern Tunnel, a rail tunnel in Seattle, Washington, United States.
- GNR Class A1 1470 Great Northern, a British steam locomotive of the Great Northern Railway and the London and North Eastern Railway.

== Other ==
- Great Northern bean, a white common bean
- Great Northern Brewing Co., an Australian beer manufacturer
- Great Northern (country band), led by former Mission Mountain Wood Band member Rob Quist
- Great northern diver (Gavia immer), a bird also known as the common loon
- Great Northern Elevator, a historic grain elevator in Buffalo, New York
- Great Northern (indie band), led by former 30 Seconds to Mars member Solon Bixler
- Great Northern War, a war fought by Russia, Denmark-Norway, and Saxony-Poland against Sweden
- Great Northern Warehouse, a leisure complex in Manchester, England
- Great Northern Paper Company, a Maine pulp and paper manufacturer
- Great Northern?, a 1947 novel by Arthur Ransome in the Swallows and Amazons series, named after the diver
- USS Great Northern (AG-9), a cargo ship of the US Navy

== See also ==
- Northern
- Great Northern Railway
