= Christchurch railway station, New Zealand =

Railway station in New Zealand

Christchurch 1st/2nd

General information
- Location: Moorhouse Avenue, Christchurch, New Zealand
- Coordinates: 43°32′25.18″S 172°38′28″E
- Owner: 1st: Canterbury Provincial Railways; 2nd: New Zealand Railways Department
- Line: Main South Line
- Platforms: Single side
- Tracks: Main line (1); Loop (1)

Construction
- Parking: Yes

History
- Opened: 1st: 1 December 1863; 2nd: 21 December 1877
- Closed: 1st: 20 December 1877; 2nd: 4 April 1993
- Rebuilt: 2nd: 1 November 1960
- Electrified: 2nd: 14 February 1929 – 18 September 1970

Services
Preceding station	Historical railways	Following station
Terminus	South Line; NZR	Addington; Line open station closed
Terminus	North Line; NZR	Addington; Line open station closed
Terminus	Lyttelton Line; NZR	Linwood; Line open station closed
Location

Christchurch 3rd
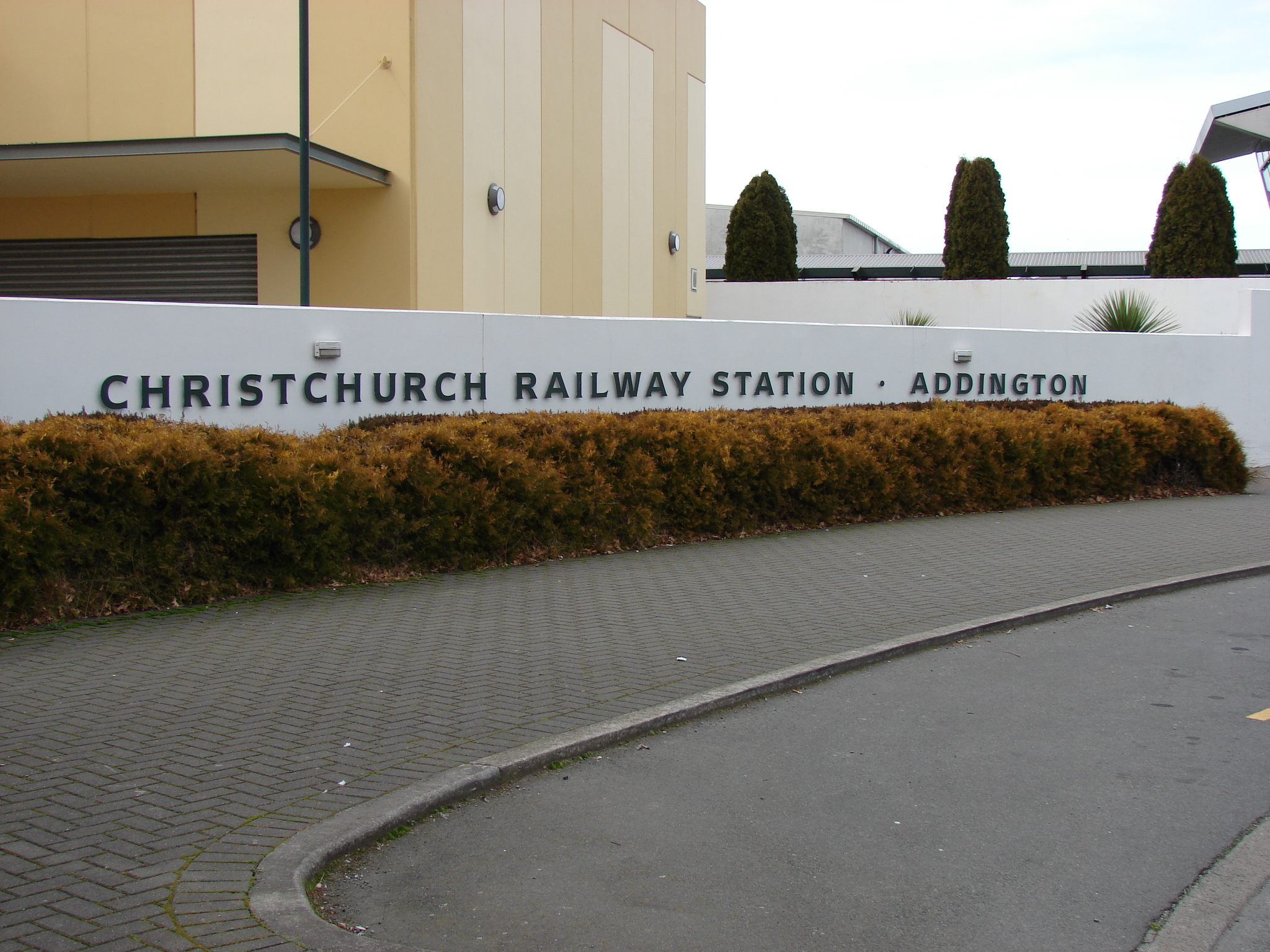

General information
- Location: Troup Drive, Addington, Christchurch, New Zealand
- Coordinates: 43°32′23.74″S 172°36′28.41″E
- Owner: KiwiRail
- Line: Main North Line
- Platforms: Single side
- Tracks: Main line (1); Loop (1)

Construction
- Parking: Yes

History
- Opened: 5 April 1993

Services
Preceding station	Great Journeys New Zealand	Following station
Terminus	Coastal Pacific	Rangiora towards Picton
Terminus	TranzAlpine	Rolleston towards Greymouth
Preceding station	Mainland Rail	Following station
Terminus	Mainlander	Rolleston towards Invercargill
Location

Christchurch railway station is in the Canterbury region of New Zealand's South Island. It is on the Main North Line at Addington junction, and is the only remaining passenger railway station in the city: suburban passenger trains were cancelled due to lack of demand in the 1970s. It is the terminus of the South Island's two remaining daily long-distance passenger trains, KiwiRail's Coastal Pacific to Picton and TranzAlpine to Greymouth. It is also the terminus of KiwiRail's seasonal Southerner to Dunedin and of Mainland Rail's Mainlander to Invercargill.

The current station is the third to serve Christchurch. The two earlier stations were adjacent to each other on Moorhouse Avenue, a short distance to the east on the Main South Line, closer to the city centre.

== History ==
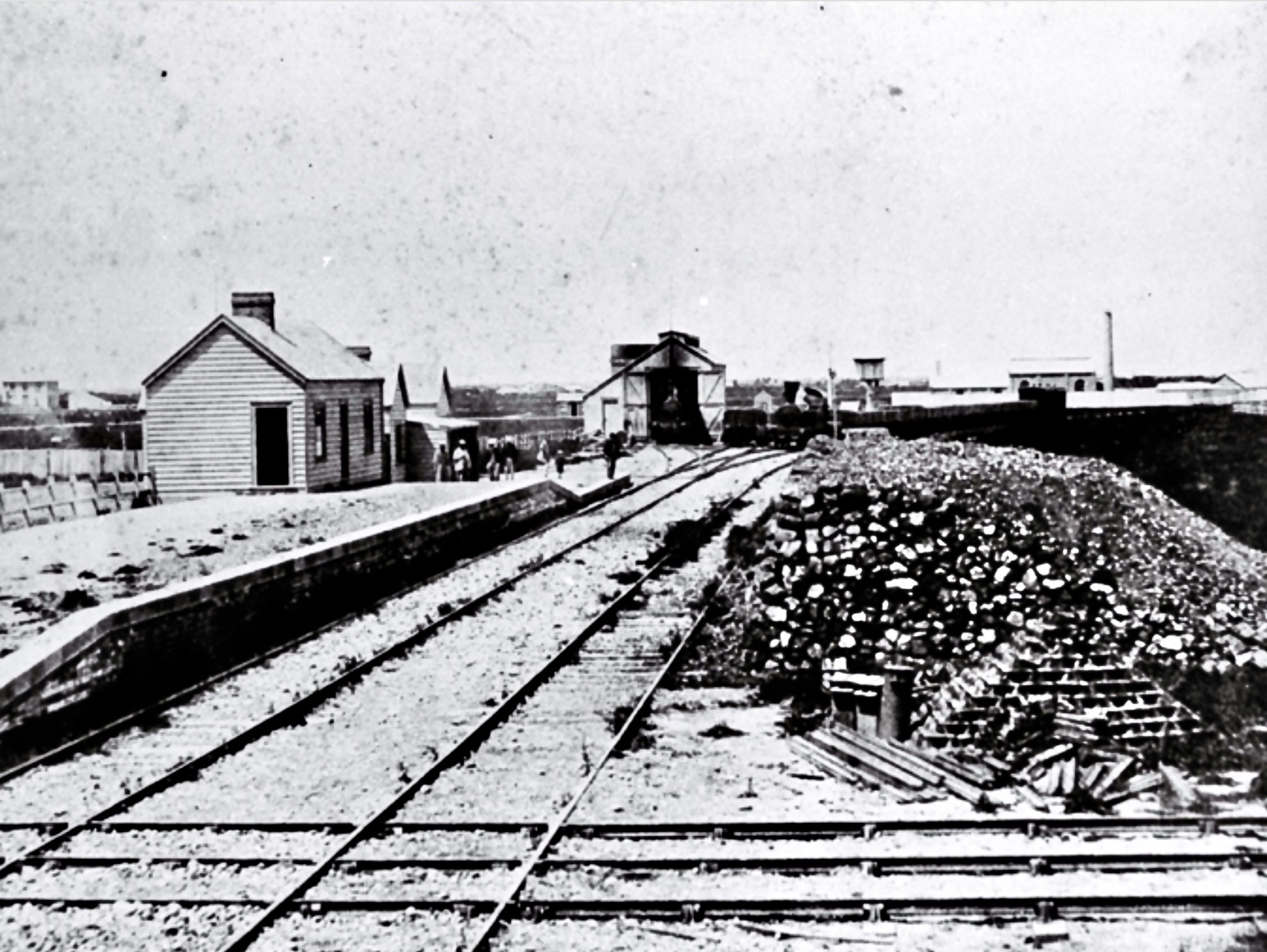
Christchurch broad gauge about 1864

=== First station ===
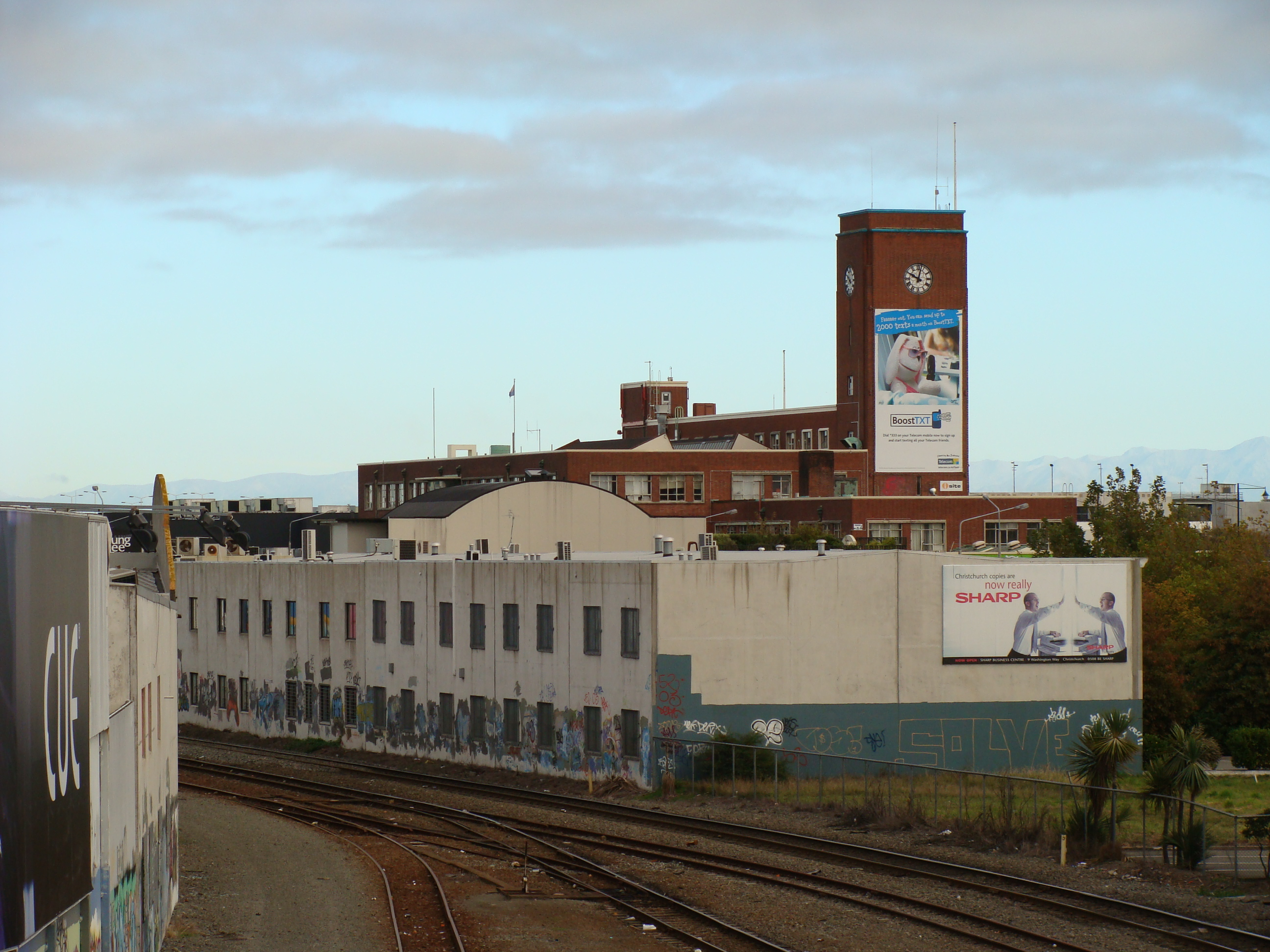
The site of Christchurch's first railway station, on Moorhouse Avenue at the bottom of Madras Street, with the 1960 station building in the background in April 2008

Christchurch's first railway station was built by the Canterbury Provincial Council for its 5 ft 3 in (1,600 mm) broad-gauge railway line between the city and the wharf at Ferrymead, opening on 1 December 1863. From 1867 the station received traffic from Lyttelton, and from the west, as the Main South Line was extended out to Addington, Rolleston, Selwyn, Rakaia, and destinations further south.

Facilities at the station were initially modest, consisting of a platform, station building, goods shed, locomotive shed, staff accommodation, a single main line and siding. It was not long before this proved to be inadequate, with an authorisation for the enlargement of the goods shed and the provision of a refreshment room forthcoming in January 1864. Later, the arrival of new locomotives resulted in the construction of additional locomotive storage, and the purchase of additional carriage stock necessitated the building of a new carriage shed. In October 1873, a new siding was laid and by 1874 a stores building with derrick had been added.

Despite these improvements, the problem of a lack of storage space at the station for goods continued. This resulted in the common practice of storing goods in wagons outside the sheds. This, combined with a high staff turnover, led to theft becoming a significant problem. The colonial government received many complaints and, on bringing this to the attention of the provincial railways, was reminded of the lack of storage facilities. Also of concern was the deterioration of the rolling stock. The engineer reported in late 1867 that new engineering facilities were urgently required to enable adequate attention to be given to maintenance. The opportunity was also taken to point out the unnecessarily high cost of handling goods traffic with inadequate shed and siding facilities. By early the following year, nearly the whole of the goods shed was in use for customs traffic. The situation had reached the point where an additional goods shed, grain and wool stores had become necessary. These problems persisted despite the relocation of buildings from Ferrymead to Christchurch, including the goods shed (converted to a two-floor stores building) and the refreshment room (converted to staff accommodation).

Traffic volume had increased to the point where, in 1874, passenger services from Lyttelton had been separated from goods traffic. By this time, the station was considered inadequate for requirements. The general manager for the provincial railways commented in August 1874 that "The present station is generally inconvenient and much too small and cramped for the present passenger traffic. It must be enlarged if it is to remain where it is … As the building is old, enlargement would mean constructing anew".

The end of the first Christchurch station coincided with the re-gauging of the provincial lines to the new colonial standard. To accommodate narrow gauge trains which were being operated in conjunction with existing broad-gauge rolling stock, a temporary platform was laid between the provincial broad-gauge station and the site of the new station in early 1876. It was first used for the departure of the first train to Timaru on 6 March 1876.

In a memorandum dated 12 December 1877, the Railways Commissioner for the Middle Island instructed the general manager for Christchurch to suspend all traffic on the 20th to allow for the final re-gauging work to take place. This marked the closure of the station and its replacement by the new station that had been erected to handle narrow-gauge traffic.

=== Proposed Christchurch city station ===
The distance from Christchurch station to the city centre became the source of discontent for many, leading The Press to comment that "Christchurch station would never be accepted as Christchurch except on a railway ticket". An economic recession had called a halt to the construction of the cathedral on the completion of its foundations, and so observed The Press that "A line of rails should be taken into the very heart of the city … Cathedral Square is becoming yearly more and more tempting for if we are not to have a cathedral, we might at least have a railway station".

Various schemes were mooted to give the railways access to the city centre, with locations near Cathedral Square being particularly coveted for the site of a central city station. Advocacy for the northern line to run down Papanui Road, or alternately from Riccarton along Rolleston Avenue, with a station near the Botanical Gardens and a siding down Worcester or Hereford Streets "into the heart of the city" was popular with "the northerners".

Interest in a central city station was deemed to be such that a group of local businessmen were prepared to invest £31,500 in such a project. They proposed to the Provincial Council in May 1872 that they construct a branch line from the Main South Line (at the point where the line curves between Gasson Street and Waltham Road) to a new station situated between Cashel Street and Lichfield Street. The line was to be double-tracked and run between Madras Street and Barbadoes Street. The terms included a clause that, on one years notice, the Provincial Council could opt to purchase the line for an agreed price of £37,000, if within three years of construction, or £25,000, if within 21 years of construction, with a covenant requiring purchase within 21 years. The Provincial Council counter-offered with an option to purchase the line at any time for £25,000. However, a more careful examination of the revenue projections for the line found them to be optimistic at best, and it was decided that any reasonable expectation of profits were to be so small as to make the venture not worth the risk.

An alternative was offered by engineer Thornton, with his plan including a single-line branch running west of Colombo Street, turning west on a 15-chain curve to Durham Street, and passing by a council yard on Worcester Street. He suggested that at some point in the future the line could "be extended up Papanui Road to form a junction with the Northern railway".

Given lessons learned from previous forays into capital projects, a risk-averse provincial administration ultimately avoided involvement in any of the proposed intra-city railway lines, and thus the idea of a central city station was shelved.

=== Second station ===
A contract for construction of a new station was let to James Tait for a price of £7,072. The commencement of work was marked by the laying of the foundation stone by Provincial Superintendent William Rolleston on 22 November 1876, one of his last official duties, just a week before provincial government was abolished. It was sited on Moorhouse Avenue and opened to traffic without ceremony on 21 December 1877.

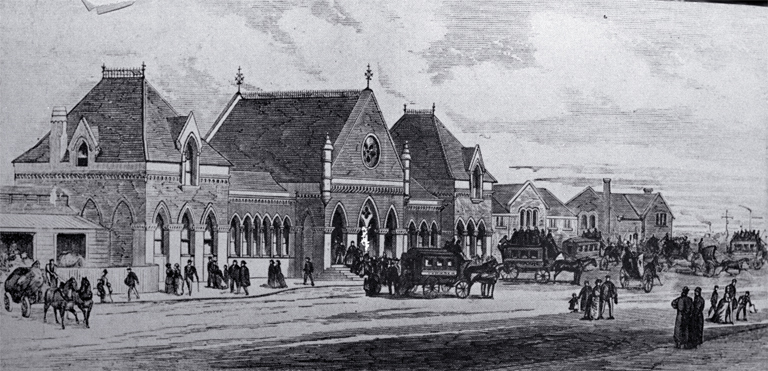
Christchurch railway station (1877–1959) in Gothic architecture

The station had been built to the specifications and design of Canterbury Railways engineer J. G. Warner in the Victorian neo-Gothic style, with wood and red brick being prominent construction materials. One of the neighbouring buildings was formerly occupied by H. M. Customs, but later became the office of the traffic manager. In addition to the main platform, there was a separate island platform connected to the former via a footbridge. Both platforms were protected from the elements by verandas.

Services from this station included the boat trains, connecting with the inter-island steamer ferries out of Lyttelton (until 1976); suburban services to Lyttelton (until 1972) and Rangiora (until 1976); inter-city services to Ashburton (until 1958) and Burnham (until 1967); rural passenger services to Lincoln (until 1880) and Culverden (later Parnassus); mixed services to Little River (until 1951), Southbridge (until 1951), Springfield (until 1968), and Dunedin; railcar services to Dunedin, Picton, Little River, and the West Coast; and long-distance passenger services to Dunedin/Invercargill, the West Coast (from 1923), and Picton Express (from 1945).

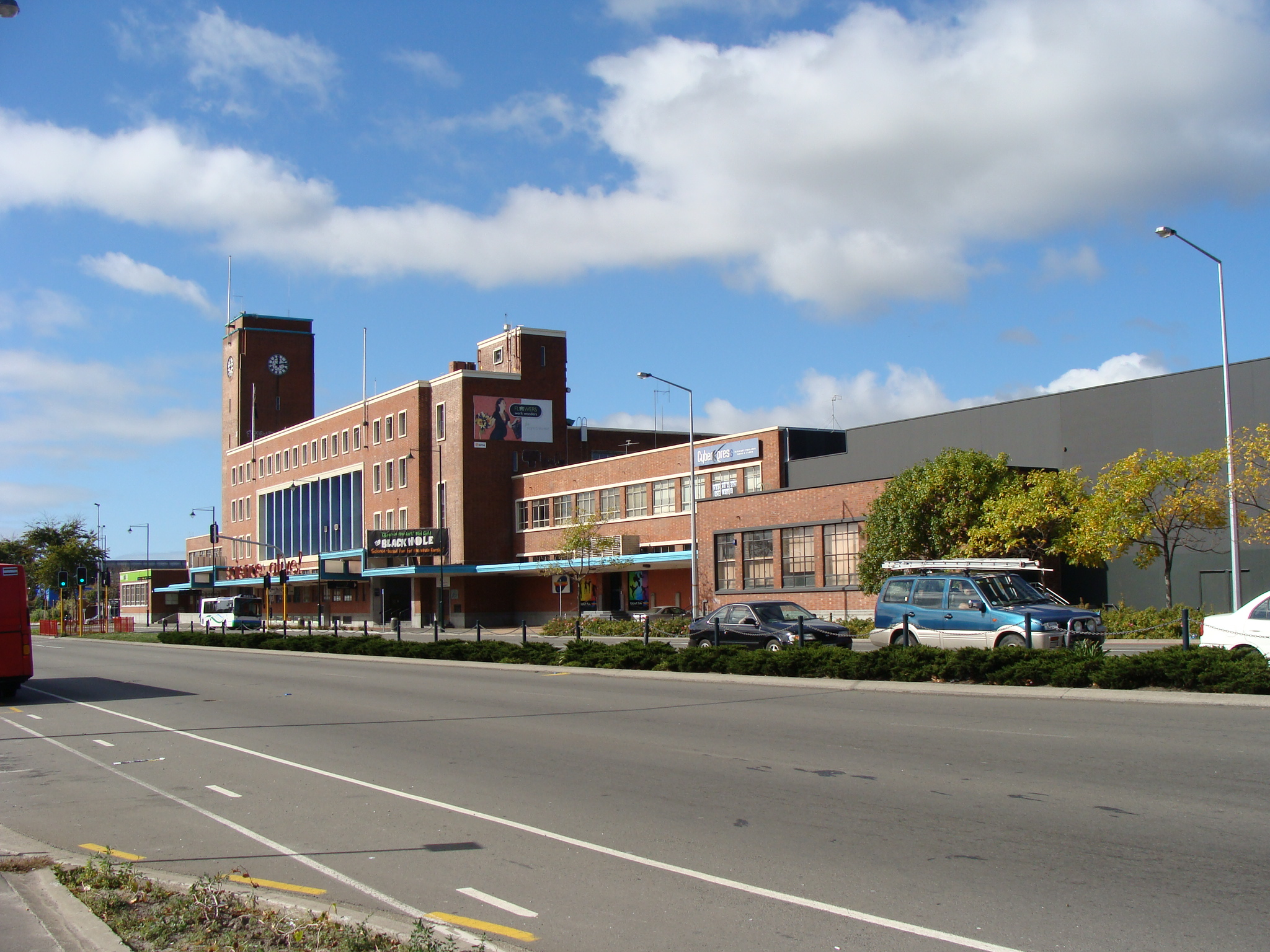
Christchurch railway station building (Moorhouse Avenue) in April 2008

One of the more notable events in the history of this station was the commissioning of New Zealand's first electrified suburban rail service in 1929. This service operated between Christchurch station and Lyttelton using Ec class locomotives. It was the second rail electrification project in New Zealand, after the successful electrification of the Otira Tunnel in 1923. The system reached the end of its useful life in 1970 and was scrapped. Christchurch, being the terminus of electric operations, was the point at which trains were marshalled to switch locomotives from electric to steam, and later diesel.

Plans for a replacement station were being made as far back as 1914, with approval for the project finally forthcoming in 1936. A proposed design for the new station, by W. Gray Young was included in the department's 1938 annual report, but the onset of war delayed any further work on the idea. The actual station, as built on the site of the existing station, followed the original design fairly closely differing primarily where an additional storey was added to the front of the main building. Construction was piecemeal, with the first stage being the completion of the new main platform in 1953, followed by final completion and official opening on 1 November 1960.

The decline in popularity of rail for passenger transport and the change in handling practices for goods traffic eventually contributed to the decision to close this station and to redevelop the site for other commercial interests. The station café closed on 25 May 1990, and the station itself was sold the following year.

==== Earthquake damage ====
The clock tower following the September 2010 earthquake with the time permanently stopped at 4:35 am

On 4 September 2010, the building's clock tower was damaged during an earthquake. The clock was damaged during the quake and became inoperative. The damage was found to be superficial and temporary repairs were made.

Further damage was sustained in the earthquake on 22 February 2011. Its condition was assessed and found to require significant repairs and strengthening. The cost of this work was expected to determine the fate of the building, with owner Science Alive! intending to exit the site and considering relocating to a new purpose-built building in the central city. The Hoyts cinema annexe also suffered serious earthquake damage.

Science Alive! determined that it was not feasible to repair the building and decided to have it demolished. Work began in August 2012 and was expected to be complete by years end, with the last part of the "above ground" structure razed on 31 October 2012. Plans have been revealed for the redevelopment of the site, including a multiplex cinema, hotel, restaurant, and retail centre.

=== Third station ===
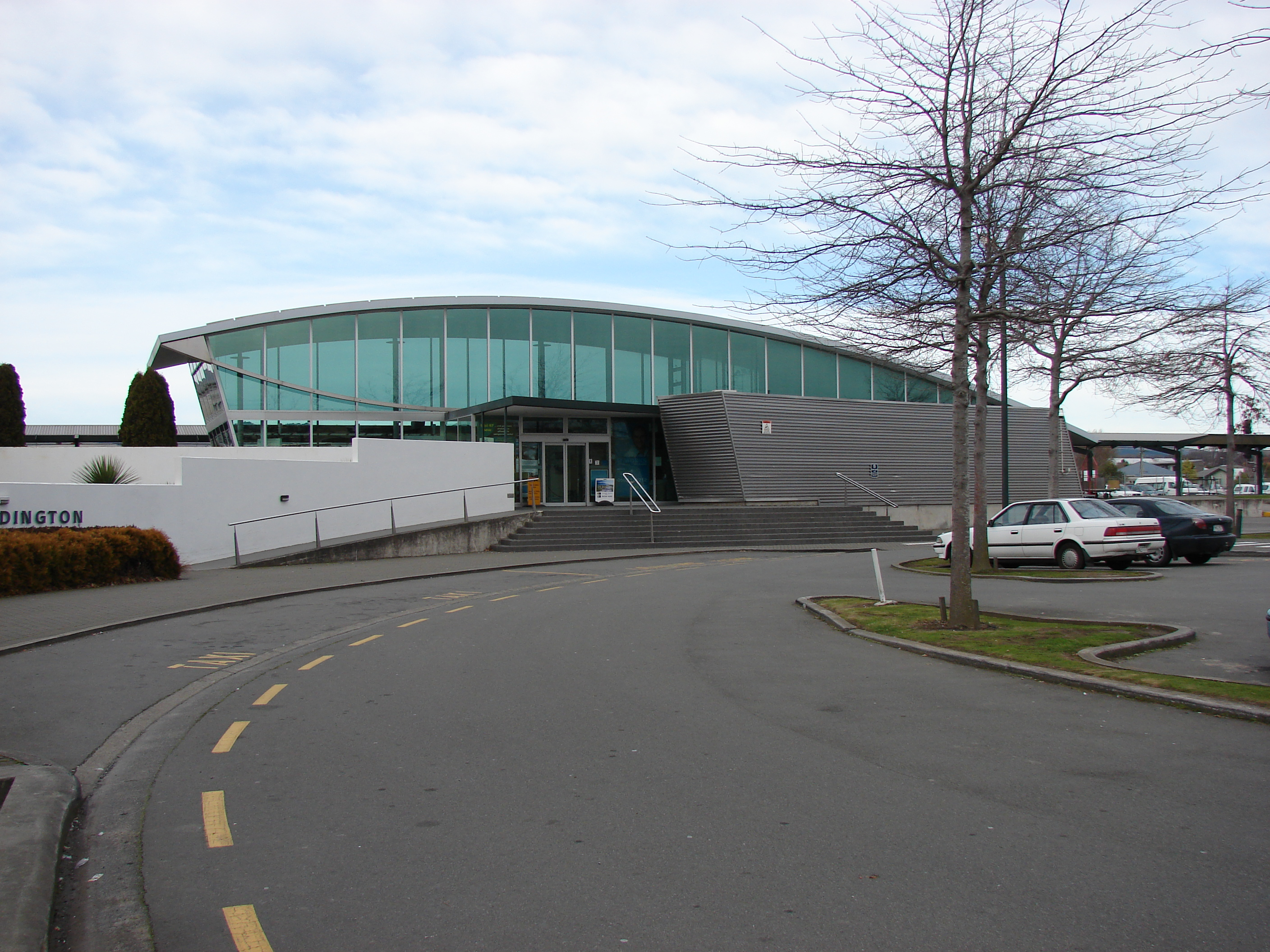
Christchurch railway station building and entrance, from car park in July 2007

It was decided to construct a new station that was more suitable for the current passenger traffic requirements. The old station, with its multiple passenger platforms and sidings, had been designed to cope with frequent passenger train arrivals and departures. As there were no longer any local passenger services, and the only long-distance passenger trains remaining were the Southerner, Coastal Pacific and the TranzAlpine, the new station was designed to cater for these services and their passengers, mainly tourists.

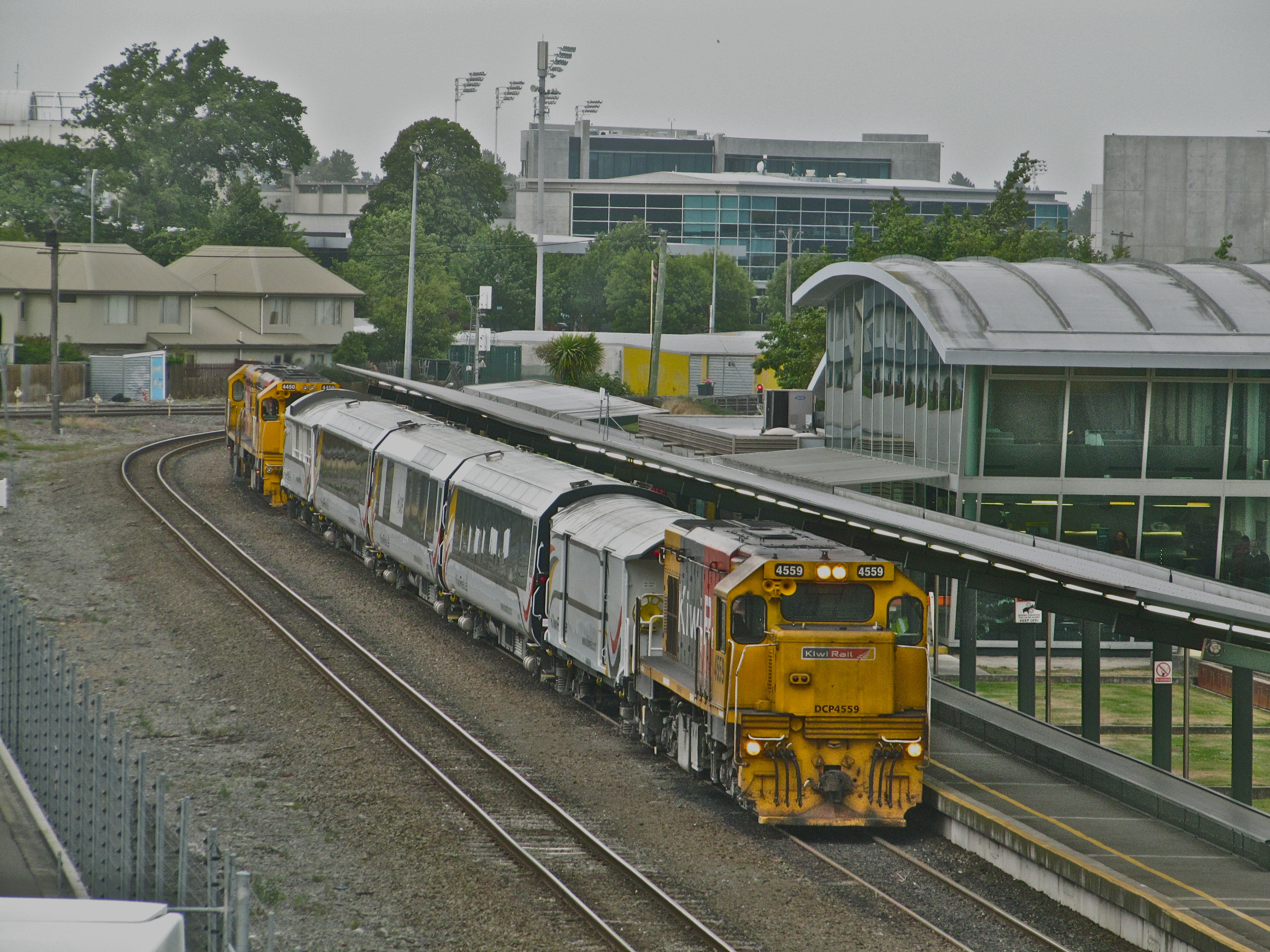
Christchurch Railway Station in December 2011

As the Addington railway workshops had recently closed, it was decided to reconfigure Addington junction and locate the new station on the former workshops site. The east-oriented junction, which passed by the former Addington Sale Yards, and which connected the Main North Line to the Main South Line, was removed. A new west-oriented link was established, on which the new station was sited. It was opened on 5 April 1993, and now shares the former workshops land with the Tower Junction shopping centre. In February 2002, the Southerner service was cancelled by leaving the station with the TranzAlpine and Coastal Pacific as its only scheduled services.

== Today ==
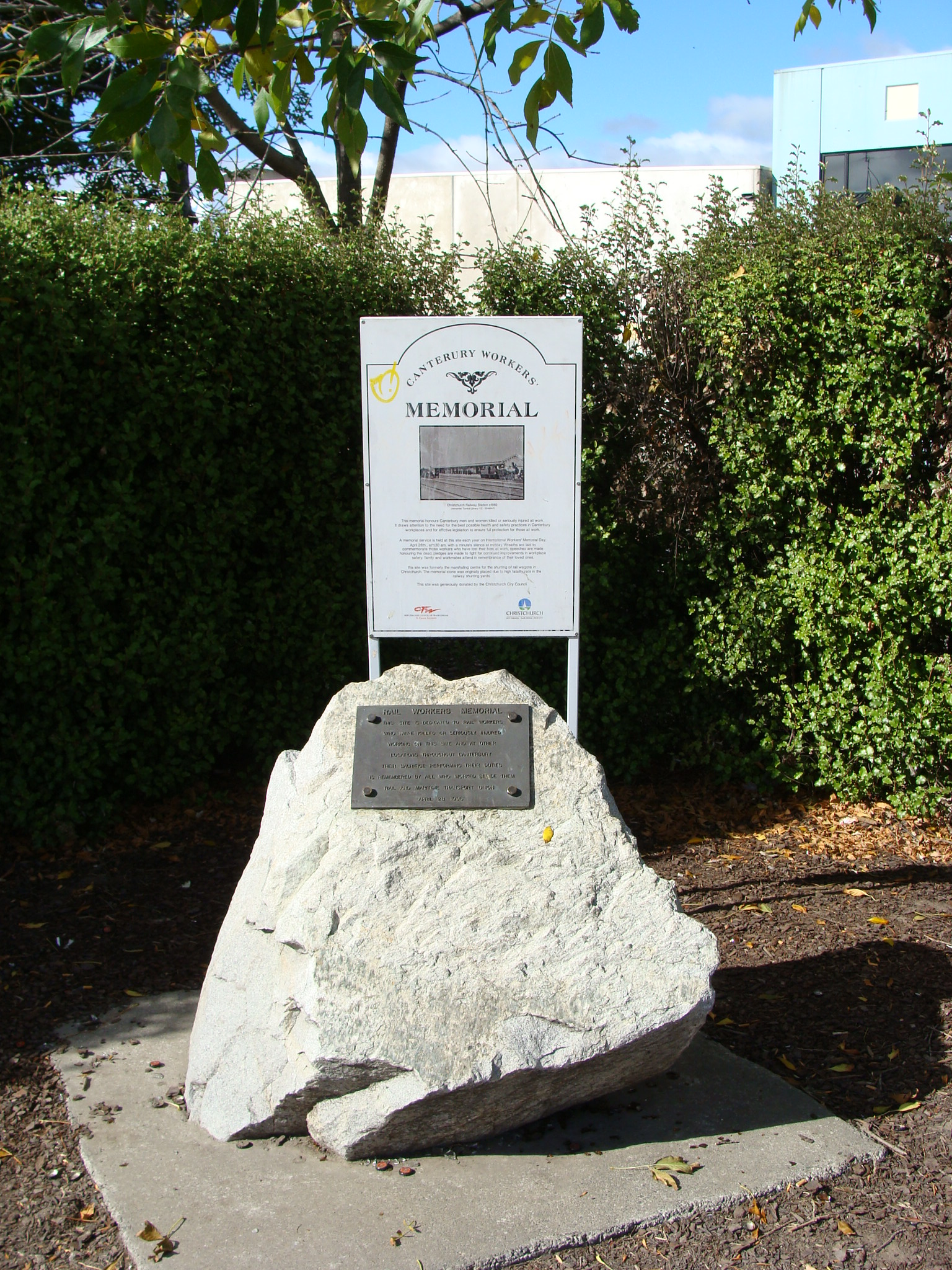
Railway workers' memorial, former Christchurch railway station, Moorhouse Avenue in April 2008

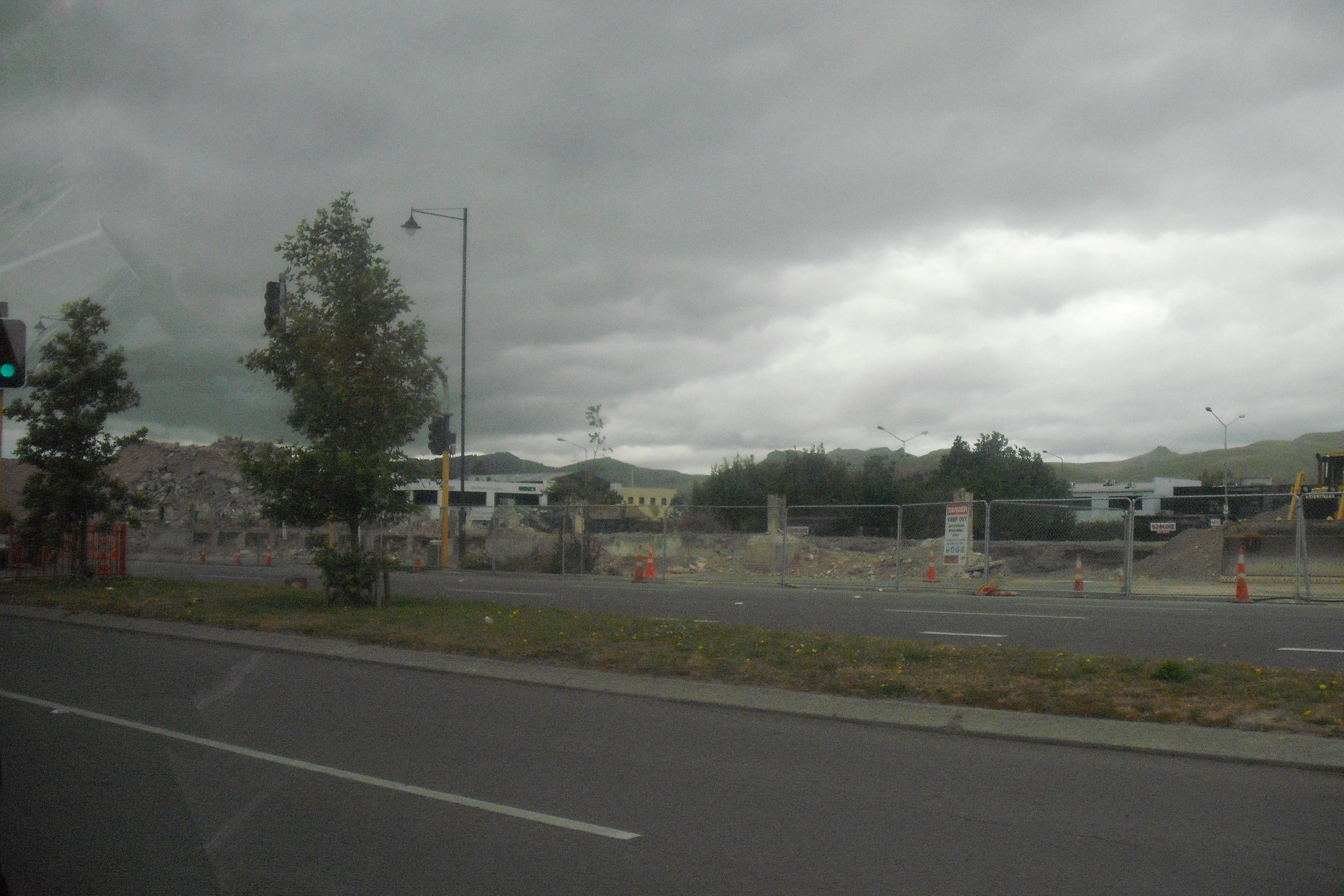
The site of the former Moorhouse Avenue railway station in December 2012 after demolition.

There is no trace of the provincial council broad-gauge station. The site on which it once stood has been developed for commercial interests.

After the second station was sold in the early 1990s, the station yard was redeveloped as a commercial precinct. The station building remained until it was damaged by the earthquake of 22 February 2011. As a commercial precinct the building housed retailers, including the Science Alive! exhibition and a Hoyts multiplex cinema (for which the building had to be extended). The building was registered with the New Zealand Historic Places Trust. The former yard area immediately behind the station building where the passenger platforms used to be became a customer car park. The remainder of the yard area is home to various commercial premises. There were a few clues at the site to remind one of the areas former purpose, including the building's dedication plaque, a railway workers memorial, and the main platform edge facing the car park behind the building.

A 2005 report commissioned by Environment Canterbury into the possibility of re-establishing passenger trains in Christchurch included an option that would involve an underground city loop track and new central railway station, but dismissed it as unjustifiable on cost/benefit grounds.

Servicing of NZR locomotive, carriages and wagons is carried out at the Waltham Mechanical Hub in Waltham.

== See also ==
- List of Christchurch railway stations
