= Kaiapoi railway station =

Former railway station in Kaiapoi, New Zealand

- Kaiapoi railway station, c. 1887–1915

General information
- Location: Kaiapoi; New Zealand
- Coordinates: 43.386921°S 172.657389°E
- Line: Main North Line
- Distance: Christchurch 18.93 km (11.76 mi)

History
- Opened: 29 April 1872
- Closed: goods 13 October 1986 passengers 1976

Services
| Preceding station | Historical railways | Following station |
|---|---|---|
| Kainga; Line open station closed | North Line; NZR | Flaxton; Line open station closed |
| Terminus | Eyreton Branch; NZR | Waverley; Line closed station closed |

Heritage New Zealand – Category 2
- Designated: 6 September 1984
- Reference no.: 3761
Location

Kaiapoi railway station was a station on the Main North Line in Kaiapoi, north of Christchurch, New Zealand. It opened on 29 April 1872 with the line from Christchurch, lost its passenger services in 1976 and closed in 1986. The station building, designed by George Troup and opened in 1904, survives as a Heritage New Zealand Category 2 historic place and now houses a cafe on the Kaiapoi riverbank.

== History ==
=== First station ===
The railway north from Christchurch reached Kaiapoi on 29 April 1872, during the Vogel public works programme. The first station was built that year by Smith and Wright. It was a plain gabled building about 50 by 15 feet, with a verandah on its east side, built to a standard Public Works Department plan. Around 1900 about eight trains a day passed through the station, and the stationmaster had a staff of four.

=== Troup station ===
The Kaiapoi Borough Council petitioned the Government for a larger station, and a new building designed by Troup was built in 1903–04 at a cost of £1,250. Sir Joseph Ward opened it on 3 February 1904 and described it as probably the finest station in the South Island. It was a timber building with a Marseilles tile roof, latticed windows, a turret at its north end and an iron lace verandah on the platform side. It had a ladies' waiting room, a luggage room, a lamp room and a porters' room.

The building was classed as Major Suburban Design No. 3, and it is the only station of that design left in New Zealand.

=== Services and freight ===
Kaiapoi was a passenger station on the Christchurch–Rangiora suburban services, and school trains carried children to Christchurch into the 1960s. The station had a goods shed, cattle and sheep yards, a loading bank and several loops and sidings, and in 1974 the Apple and Pear Marketing Board planned a cool store beside the station with railway siding facilities. The station also served local industry, including the North Canterbury Sheepfarmers' Co-operative freezing works on Bowler Street, which operated from 1917 to 1991, and the Sutherland timber mill beside the station site. The stock yards closed on 3 December 1977, and the goods shed was gone by 1987.

Kaiapoi was the junction for the Eyreton Branch, which opened in 1875 and closed fully by April 1965. The branch left the Main North Line just north of the station and served communities west of Kaiapoi, such as West Eyreton. Branch trains ran down the main line to Kaiapoi, where they started and ended their journeys. A duplication of the line between Eyreton Junction and Kaiapoi was proposed in 1912 but was never built.

=== Level crossing ===
The level crossing beside the station, on High Street (now Williams Street), was regarded as the most dangerous in North Canterbury. In 1935 it received flashlight signals, then the only system of their type in the South Island. On 13 April 1943 a train from Rangiora struck a bus at the crossing, killing one passenger and injuring ten.

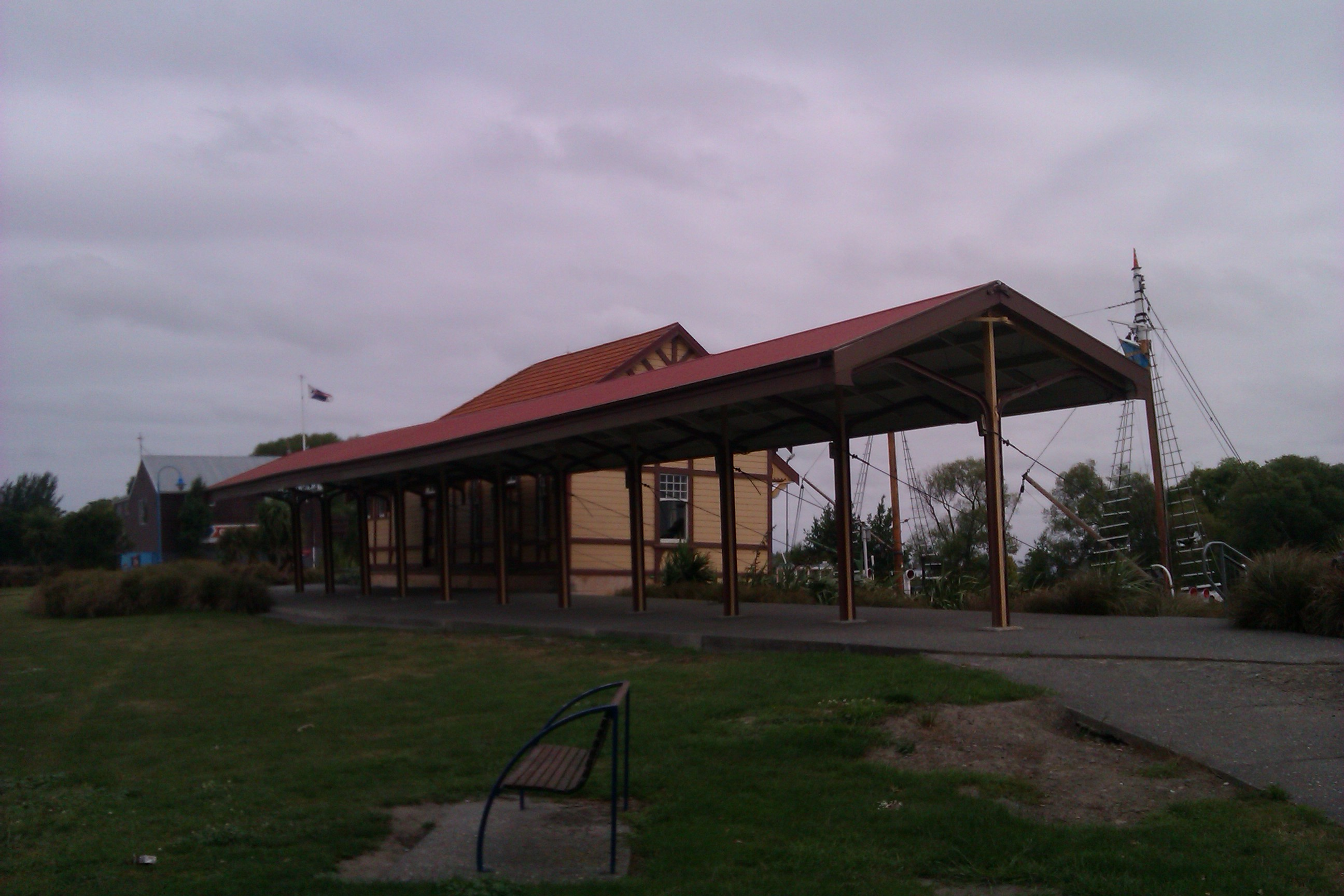
The relocated station before Canterbury earthquakes

== Decline ==
A storm in late 1976 damaged the building, and much of it was demolished, leaving the northern part. Passenger services ended in 1976, tickets continued to be sold at the station until 1986, and the station closed to freight on 13 October 1986. The building was neglected and vandalised and survived three fires. It was classified by the New Zealand Historic Places Trust in 1984. In the early 1990s New Zealand Rail offered the building for sale, and proposals included moving it to Christchurch.

== Preservation and relocation ==
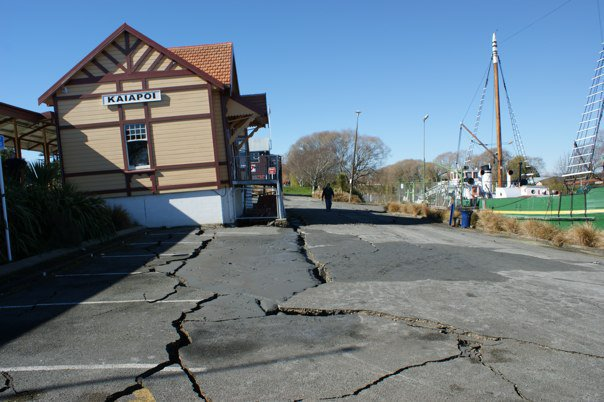
The relocated station building beside the river, damaged after the Canterbury earthquakes

The Kaiapoi Railway Station Trust was formed in October 2000 to move and restore the building as a visitor information centre. On 3 April 2002 it was moved from Hilton Street to a riverbank site at 65 Charles Street, and it reopened on 1 June 2003 as the Kaiapoi Visitor Information Centre. The 4 September 2010 earthquake caused liquefaction that left the building leaning towards the river, though it survived. The platform canopy was damaged in the earthquake, removed and put into storage. In 2012 it was moved about 150 metres north-west along Charles Street, and it reopened in April 2013 as the Waimakariri i-SITE.

On 6 July 2023 a crane lifted the building, which weighs about 40 tonnes, onto the riverbank site, its fourth location. It is now a cafe, Paris for the Weekend.

== Heritage status ==
The former station building is a Category 2 historic place (list number 3761) and a Waimakariri District Council historic heritage item (HH045). Heritage New Zealand cites its reflection of the era when railways dominated New Zealand transport, its association with Troup and community esteem for the building. It was given Landmarks status in 2013.

== Station site today ==
The original station site beside the railway line is now occupied by a self-storage yard, housing and storage buildings, and the building itself stands on the riverbank. The Sutherland timber mill remains beside the site.

== See also ==
- Eyreton Branch
