= Belfast railway station, New Zealand =

Disused railway station in Belfast, New Zealand

Belfast
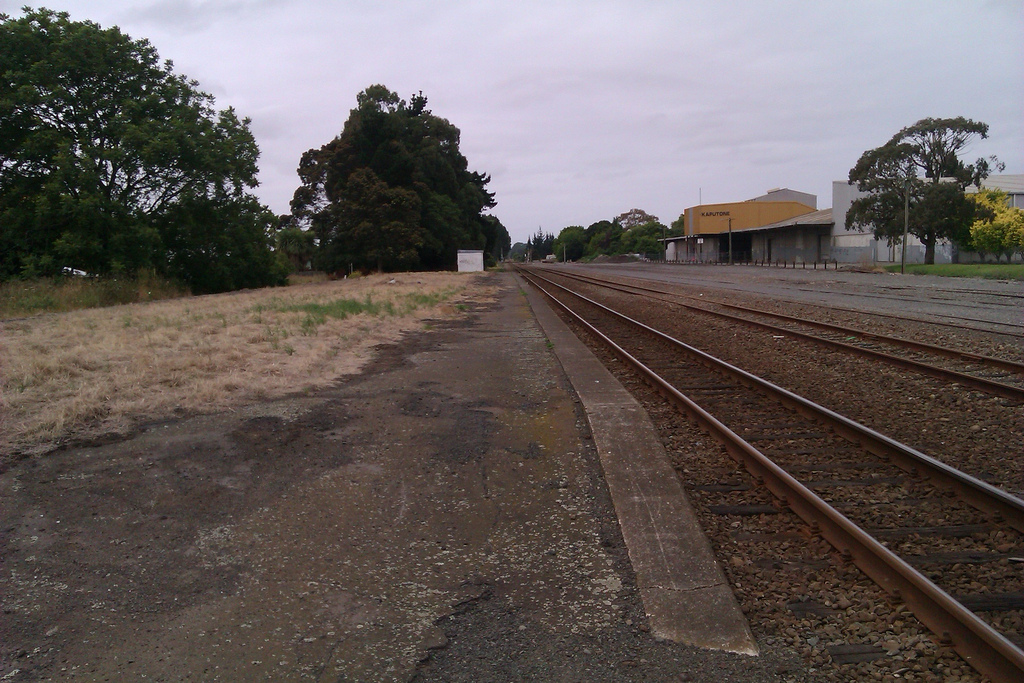
- The disused platform, with the Kaputone wool works building in the background

General information
- Location: Belfast, Christchurch
- Coordinates: 43°26′53.1″S 172°38′14.1″E
- System: New Zealand Government Railways
- Owner: KiwiRail
- Line: Main North Line
- Distance: 11.24 km from Addington Junction
- Platforms: Island platform

History
- Opened: 29 April 1872
- Closed: 13 October 1986 (goods)

Services
Preceding station	Historical railways	Following station
Styx; Line open station closed	North Line; NZR	Chaneys; Line open station closed
Location

Belfast railway station is a former station on the Main North Line in Belfast, a northern suburb of Christchurch, New Zealand. It opened in 1872, and by 1940 was the busiest station handling goods and livestock north of Addington. The station was rebuilt with an island platform in the early 1940s, and was known for its gardens, which won the regional railway station garden competition several times. It closed to goods traffic in 1986.

== History ==
=== Early years ===
Belfast station opened on 29 April 1872, when the Main North Line was opened from Addington to Kaiapoi. By 1882 it had a shelter shed, a passenger platform and a stationmaster's house.

In February 1921, the Belfast Progress League raised the condition of the station with the Prime Minister, William Massey, complaining that passengers alighting from the train to Christchurch sometimes had to cross the tracks to reach the platform.

=== Rebuilding ===
In November 1940, the General Manager of Railways announced alterations at Belfast, describing it as the busiest station handling goods and livestock north of Addington. The station building was moved to a new site and renovated, and the platform was lengthened to 300 feet (91 m) and converted to an island platform.

Belfast station and its gardens in the 1920s, with the Kaputone Wool Works in the background

=== Gardens ===
Belfast station was noted for its gardens, winning the L. B. Hart Challenge Cup for the best railway station garden in the district in 1940 and in three successive years from 1965 to 1967.

=== Closure ===
Suburban passenger services between Christchurch and Rangiora ended in 1976, and the station closed to goods traffic on 13 October 1986. In 1991, New Zealand Rail Ltd advertised the station building for lease. A proposal in 1992–93 to move the historic building to South Hagley Park for use by a horse-riding business met public opposition and did not go ahead.

== Today ==
The island platform remains beside the Main North Line, although no passenger trains stop there. Belfast is now a passing loop with sidings. It marks the northern end of centralised traffic control (CTC) on the line from Christchurch; north of Belfast, track warrant control is used.

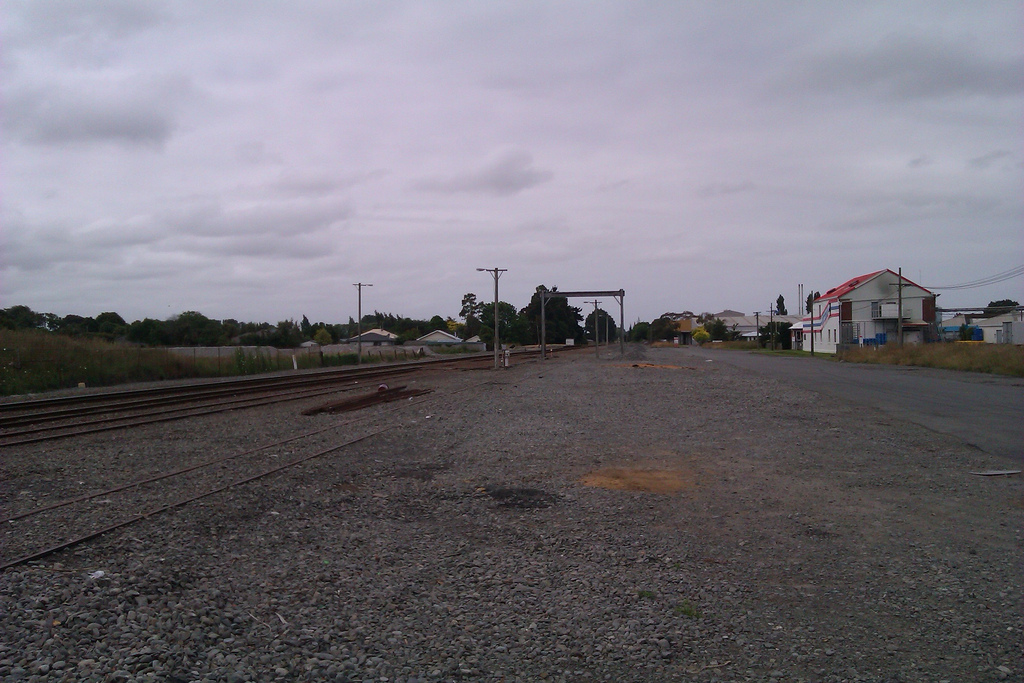

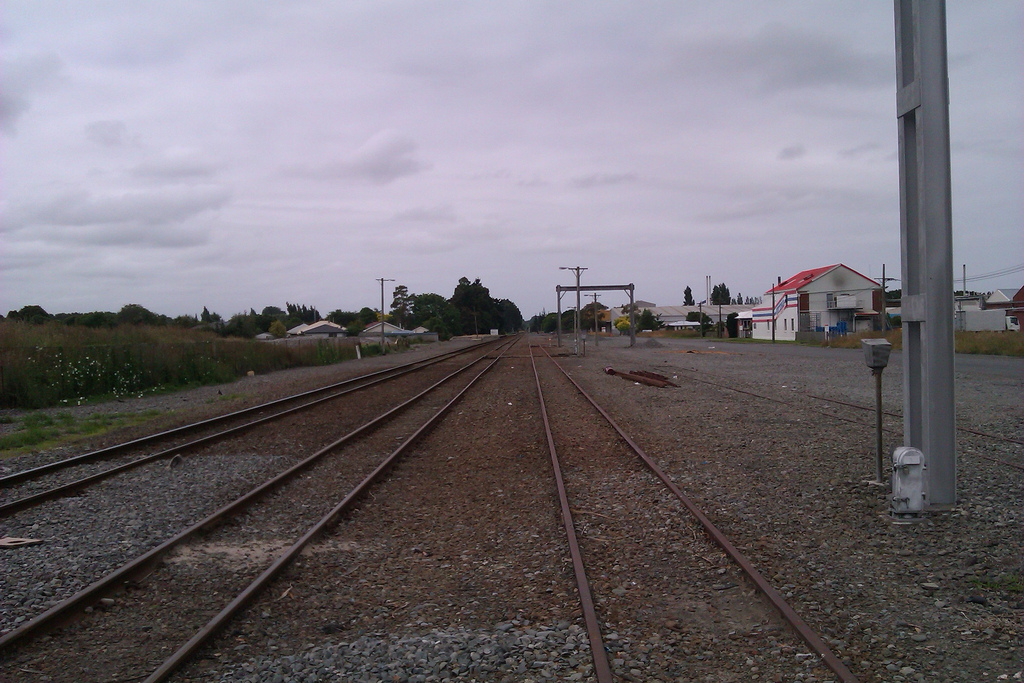

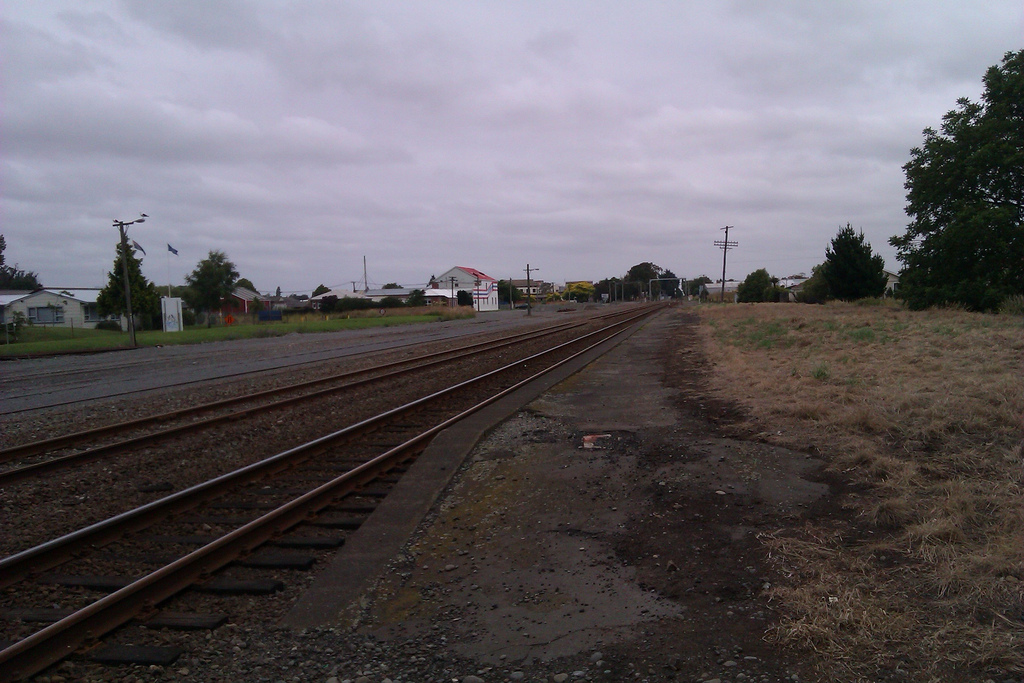

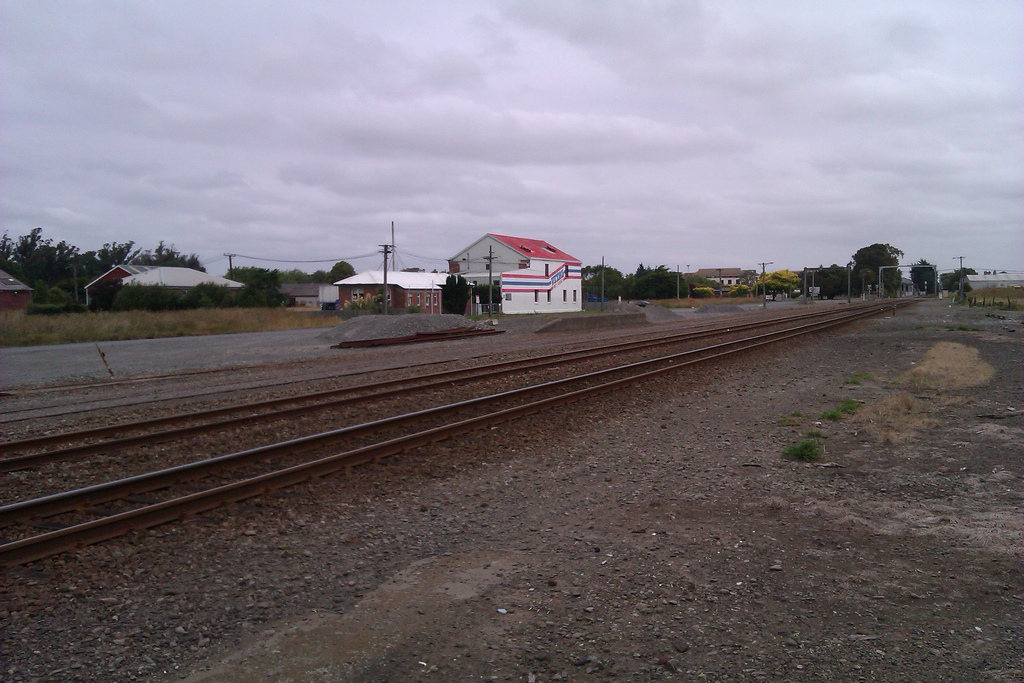
