= Northern Railway =

Northern Railway may refer to:

- North railway (Austria)
- Northern Railway (California), predecessor of the Southern Pacific Company
- Northern Railway of Canada
- Northern Railway Zone (India)
- Northern Railway (Ireland)
- Northern Railway (Namibia)
- Nevada Northern Railway
- Northern Railway (Russia)
- Northern line (Sri Lanka)
- Northern Railway (Western Australia)
- Berlin Northern Railway, a railway line in Germany
- Palatine Northern Railway, another railway line in Germany
- Emperor Ferdinand Northern Railway, a former railway company in the Austrian Empire

== See also ==
- Northern Trains, a current train operating company in England
- Northern Rail, a former train operating company in England
- Northern Line (disambiguation)
- North Line (disambiguation)
- Great Northern Railway (disambiguation)
- Northern Railroad (disambiguation)
- Nordbahn (disambiguation)
