= Paris and Great Northern Railroad =

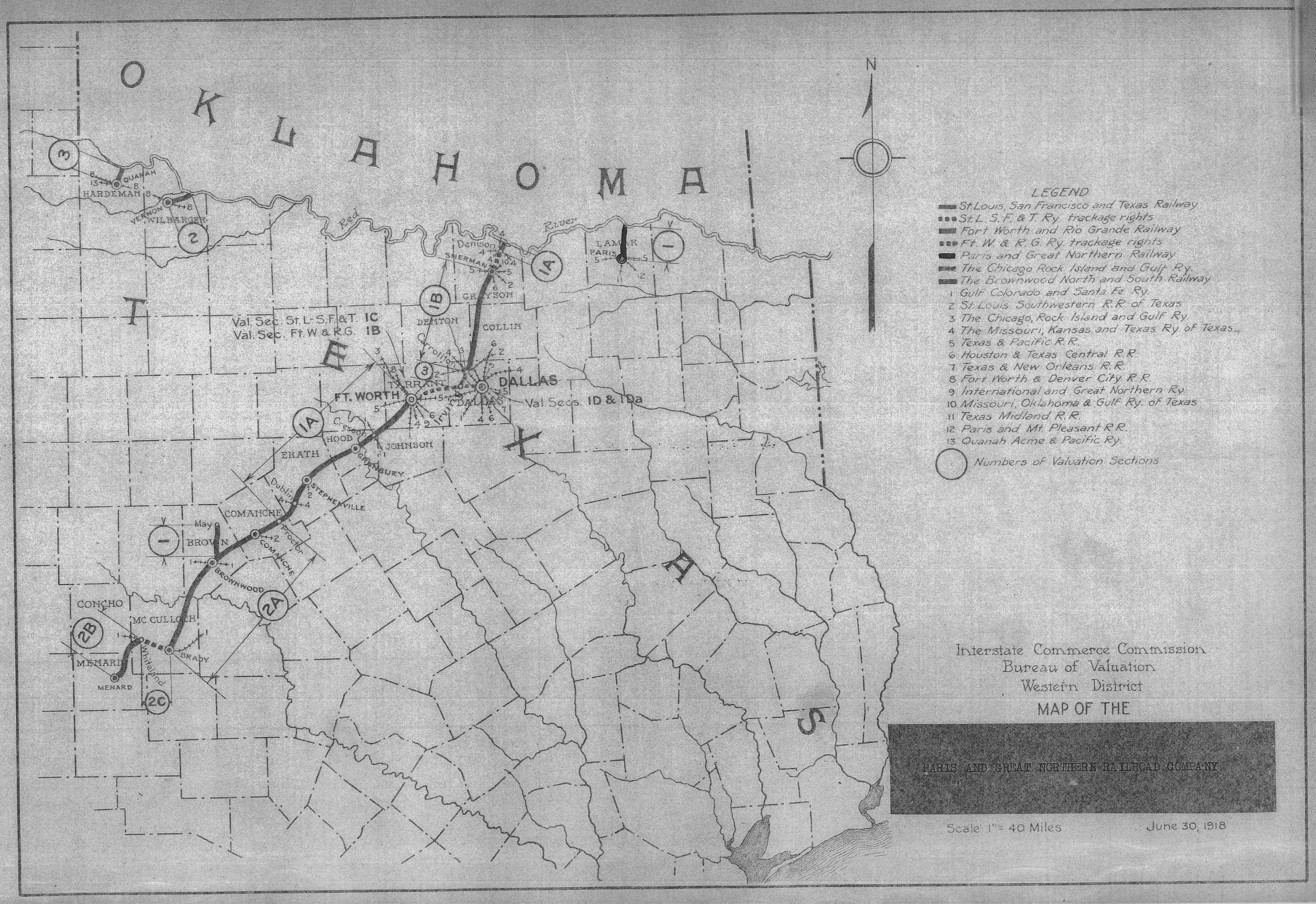
- 1918 map of the railroad

Overview
- Headquarters: Paris, Texas
- Locale: Texas
- Dates of operation: 1888–1928
- Successor: St. Louis, San Francisco and Texas Railway Company

Technical
- Track gauge: 4 ft 8 1/2 in (1,435 mm) standard gauge

The Paris and Great Northern Railroad (“P&GN”), a wholly owned subsidiary of the St. Louis–San Francisco Railway (“SLSF”), was incorporated July 28, 1881 for the purpose of building a railroad from Paris, Texas to a connection with the SLSF at the Red River. Work commenced in February 1886, and the line—which included a bridge over the Red River—was placed in operation in January 1888. The mainline stretched 16.210 miles, the railroad also having 8.337 miles of yard tracks and sidings, for 24.547 miles total. The line was operated directly by the SLSF until September 1, 1902, after which the P&GN operated it, except during World War I when it was operated by the United States Railroad Administration. On June 1, 1928, the railway was merged into another SLSF entity, the St. Louis, San Francisco and Texas Railway Company (“SLSF&T”).

The P&GN was a participant, along with an Atchison, Topeka and Santa Fe Railway subsidiary, in the Union Station which opened in 1912 in Paris, Texas. That station, under the name of the Santa Fe-Frisco Depot, is now on the National Register of Historic Places listings in Lamar County, Texas. Passenger service out of the station continued on the line until 1956.

The SLSF&T was itself merged into the SLSF on January 1, 1964, and the SLSF was merged into the Burlington Northern Railway Company—now the BNSF—on November 21, 1980. On July 22, 1987, the Kiamichi Railroad acquired the trackage as part of its Hugo, Oklahoma to Paris, Texas line. The purchase included the depot, which was donated to the City of Paris for restoration. The depot now houses the Valley of the Caddo Museum & Cultural Center.
