= Northern line (disambiguation) =

The Northern line is a London Underground line that runs between North London and South London.

Northern line can also refer to:

== Train lines and services ==
=== United Kingdom ===
- North London line, part of the London Overground
- Northern City Line, between Moorgate and Finsbury Park
- Northern line (Merseyrail)

=== Elsewhere ===
- Nordland Line, Norway
- Northern Line (Cape Town)
- Northern Line (SRT), Thailand
- Northern line (Sri Lanka)
- T9 T9 Northern Line, Australia
- Northern Commuter line, Dublin
- Linha do Norte (English: Northern Line), a railway line in Portugal, connecting Lisbon at Santa Apolónia to Porto at Campanhã

== Other uses ==
- Northern Line (group)
- Northern Airport Line, China
- Northern Limit Line, the maritime border between North and South Korea

== See also ==
- North Line (disambiguation)
- Northern Railway (disambiguation)
