= Culverden Express =

Passenger train in New Zealand

The Culverden Express was a passenger train operated by the New Zealand Railways Department between Christchurch and Culverden. It ran from 1886 until its replacement by the Picton Express in 1945 and its route followed both the Main North Line and the Waiau Branch. In the mid-1920s, the main northern terminus became Parnassus, and to reflect this, the name was changed to the Parnassus Express.

== Introduction ==
On 8 February 1886, the railway line from Christchurch to Culverden was opened. Initially envisaged as part of the main route north to Marlborough, an express passenger train began operating between the two towns. It was the most important passenger train in the northern Canterbury region and it received modern rolling stock and steam locomotives, such as the U^{B} class of 1899. In 1919, when the railway was extended beyond Culverden to Waiau, the Express's operation was extended too: it ran twice daily between Christchurch and Culverden, continuing thrice weekly through to Waiau.

== A new route ==
In 1900, work began on a coastal route north of Waipara, where the Main North Line turned inland to run through the Weka Pass to Culverden. This line reached Parnassus in 1912. Initially, the service to Culverden remained the main Express, with carriages for Parnassus detached at Waipara and operated separately through to Parnassus. However, in the mid-1920s, Parnassus became the primary terminus, with the carriages detached in Waipara now conveyed to Culverden. The name of the train was changed to the Parnassus Express to reflect the alteration. This train was used for trials of the 'Midland Red' paint scheme to replace the Railways Department's former olive green with yellow trim livery; this paint scheme later came to be used nationwide through to the 1990s.

== Replacement ==
The Culverden Express route gradually declined in importance as Parnassus became the primary terminus and work began on the coastal route as the line to the north. The New Zealand Railways Road Services bus operations were actively encouraged, resulting in a stark decline in passenger demand on the Waipara-Culverden-Waiau route on what was now the Waiau Branch. In 1914, 20,000 passengers were carried, but by 1938, this figure was down to 3,000 annually and passenger services on the Waiau Branch were cancelled on 29 January 1939. The service to Parnassus continued to operate until the Main North Line was completed in full from Christchurch to Picton in December 1945. With the full line open, the Parnassus train was replaced by the Picton Express.
