= Picton Express =

Former New Zealand express train

The Picton Express was a passenger express train operated by the New Zealand Railways Department (NZR) between Christchurch and Picton. It ran from December 1945 until February 1956, and was thus the shortest-lived provincial express in New Zealand. Following the end of railcar services in 1976, a new carriage train between Christchurch and Picton began, under the same name as the earlier service, until it was replaced in 1988 by the Coastal Pacific Express.

== Introduction ==
The Main North Line took over half a century to build, and passengers using the northern portion in Marlborough were primarily catered for with mixed trains, while the southern section was the route of the Culverden Express. As of the mid-1920s, the Culverden Express began to terminate at the coastal Parnassus terminus rather than the inland Culverden terminus, and this was the forerunner to the Picton Express. The route north of Parnassus was completed as the Main North Line on 15 December 1945, and from this date, the Picton Express was introduced, operating the length of the line.

== Operation ==
The Picton Express began life as a daily service, offering a swifter connection between Canterbury and Marlborough than previously available. However, after operating for only a month, coal shortages in January 1946 meant that it was cut to thrice weekly, running on Mondays, Wednesdays and Fridays. It operated to this schedule for the rest of its existence, except when extra trains were run at peak holiday times such as Christmas and Easter. In 1950 the northbound journey took 8 hours and 15 minutes, departing Christchurch at 8:25am and arriving Picton at 4:40pm. The southbound journey took 8 hours and 22 minutes; its Picton departure was at 9:45am and it arrived in Christchurch at 6:07pm. The two services passed each other north of Kaikōura. In Blenheim, passengers could make road connections to Nelson. As the Railways Department did not operate dining cars at any time during the Picton Express's life, stops were made at Waipara and Kaikoura for passengers to buy refreshments. The train was always hauled by steam locomotives, typically of the A^{B} class.

== Railcar replacement ==
As the 1950s began, competition increased from airlines, buses, and private cars. Passenger numbers began to dwindle, especially during off-peak periods, and the Railways Department began to investigate railcar alternatives that would be better suited to the service. In February 1956, just over ten years after the Picton Express began operating, it was replaced by the much faster RM class 88 seater railcars.

The 88 seater railcars, however, proved expensive and time-consuming to maintain, and from 1967 began to be phased out with Picton route reverting to older Vulcan railcars and summer passenger trains. The Picton service was regarded as a local service for North Canterbury and Marlborough locals and for their convenience and because of an agreement with the Union Steam Ship Company not to compete with its Lyttelton-Wellington steamer express ferry service, no southbound connection was available with NZR's own rail ferry at Picton and only a limited connection with the 6:45 pm ferry northbound.

== Reinstatement ==
When the railcars wore out in the 1970s, they were replaced by a carriage train, which was introduced because of the withdrawal of the rival Lyttelton-Wellington steamer express, operated by the Rangitira in 1976. That year, at the suggestion of Rangiora Member of Parliament Derek Quigley, the former first-class carriages previously used on the overnight mixed goods Picton–Christchurch train were transferred to the daytime express, and several other NZR 56-foot carriages were fitted with heaters. The new train replaced the railcar service from 1 July 1976.

This reborn Picton Express proved something of a success. The service made use of AC class "Grassgrub" articulated carriages, which were de-motored railcars. From 11 October 1982, the Grassgrubs were replaced by a normal carriage train.

From 1982 until September 1988 the Picton Express and the Greymouth and West Coast Expresses shared a pool of twelve former second-class NZR 56-foot carriages and guards vans with six 50-foot wooden box wagons, all painted bright red with wall-to-wall carpet, fluorescent strip lights and later, a new design of seat from Addington Workshops. Carriages with luggage space seated 46, passenger-only carriages seated 52.

In 1984–1985, while the carriages were being fitted with new seats, three Southerner carriages and an FM class modular guards van for baggage were used. In 1987, due to the need to re-equip the Northerner trains, the carriages were reallocated and refurbished. In 1988 the Railways Corporation announced it was replacing the Picton Express with a new train along the lines of the successful TranzAlpine between Christchurch and Greymouth launched in 1987. On 25 September 1988, the train was re-launched as the "Coastal Pacific Express." The train was later rebranded as the TranzCoastal.
