= Rail transport in Christchurch =

Railway network in Christchurch, New Zealand

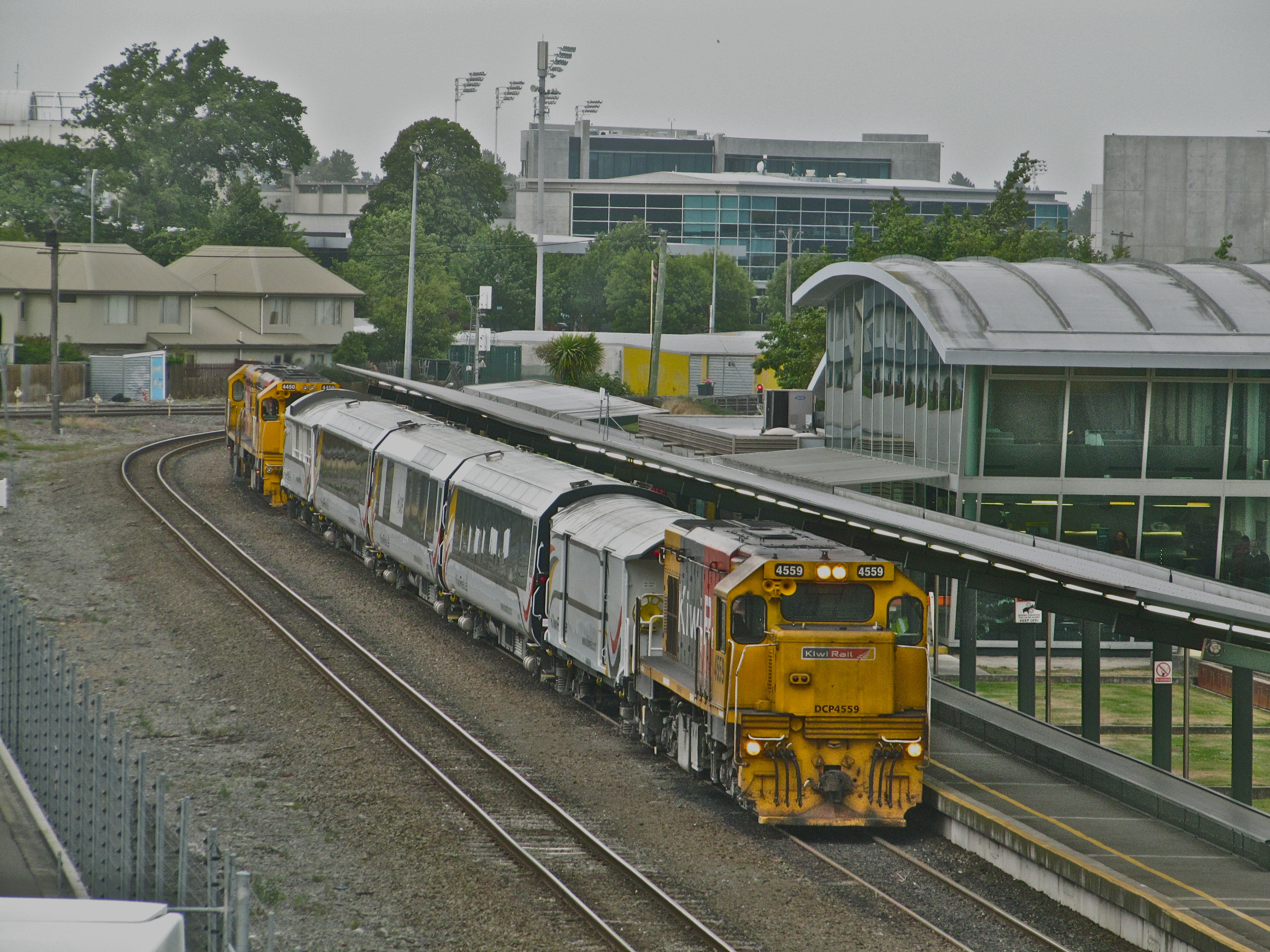
- The Coastal Pacific at Christchurch railway station, 2011

Operation
- National railway: KiwiRail
- Infrastructure company: New Zealand Railways Corporation (land); KiwiRail (track)
- Major operators: Great Journeys New Zealand franchise; Mainland Rail; Heritage operators

Track gauge
- Main: 3 ft 6 in (1,067 mm)

Features
- No. of tunnels: 1
- Longest tunnel: Lyttleton Tunnel 2.595 km (1.612 mi)
- No. of stations: 3 (Addington, Rangiora, Rolleston)

Rail transport in Christchurch, the largest city on New Zealand's South Island, consists of two main trunk railway lines (Main North Line and Main South Line, collectively but unofficially known as the South Island Main Trunk Railway) which intersect in the suburb of Addington. These primarily carry long-haul freight, but also two long distance tourist-oriented passenger services: The TranzAlpine and the Coastal Pacific. A heritage railway and tramway network operated by the Ferrymead Historic Park operates steam, electric, and diesel motive power hauling tourist-oriented services.

In 2026, a 12-month trial of commuter rail services to be operated by Mainland Rail was announced by the government. At the same time, Mainland Rail's Mainlander service, which only runs on weekends from Christchurch to Invercargill, was to be extended to a regular service.

The port at Lyttelton is a significant destination for rail freight, particularly for coal from the West Coast transported over the Midland Line. Much of the freight transported by rail through Christchurch is not ultimately destined for the city.

== History ==
For the first century of its existence, the role of the railways in Christchurch was to connect the port at Lyttelton to the productive areas around Christchurch on the Canterbury Plains. A network of branch lines connected these areas to the Main South Line and Main North Line, which provided access to the port via the Lyttelton rail tunnel, enabling farm supplies to be delivered and food crops, wool, meat, and livestock to be shipped to market. From the 1930s, rail faced increasing competition from road transport, leading to the piecemeal closure of the branch line network up to the 1960s.

=== Notable people ===
==== William Sefton Moorhouse (1825–1881) ====
William Sefton Moorhouse, Superintendent of the Canterbury Province in 1857–1863 and 1866–1868, was a significant advocate for the development of the railways in Christchurch. He was involved in several relevant and notable events, including the opening of both the Ferrymead Railway and the Lyttelton rail tunnel, and the development of the Canterbury Great Southern Railway (now the Main South Line).

==== Edward Dobson (1816–1908) ====
Edward Dobson, Provincial Engineer for the Canterbury Province in 1854–1868, was responsible for designing and overseeing the construction of many important public works. He designed a system of railways for the province, and by the time he retired, the Canterbury Great Southern Railway had reached Lyttelton and advanced as far south as the Selwyn River.

=== Lines ===
Railway lines in Christchurch were at first constructed by the Canterbury Provincial Council to a gauge of 5 ft 3 in (1,600 mm) due to the availability of rolling stock and motive power from Australia using this gauge, with these lines reaching south to Rakaia (in June 1873) and north to Amberley (in February 1876).

Control over the railways passed to the Colonial Government following abolition of the provinces on 1 November 1876, and all lines were re-gauged to the new national standard of 3 ft 6 in (1,067 mm).

==== Eyreton Branch ====
The Eyreton Branch line was constructed at the behest of parochial interests in the town of Kaiapoi, and connected the town to farming districts to the west. In an attempt to make it profitable, considering its proximity to the Oxford Branch, it was connected to the Oxford Branch and effectively served as a shortcut for local traffic between Oxford and Christchurch until the connection with the Oxford Branch was closed in 1931. It was closed beyond Wetheral in 1954 (where it served a flour mill) and closed completely in 1965.

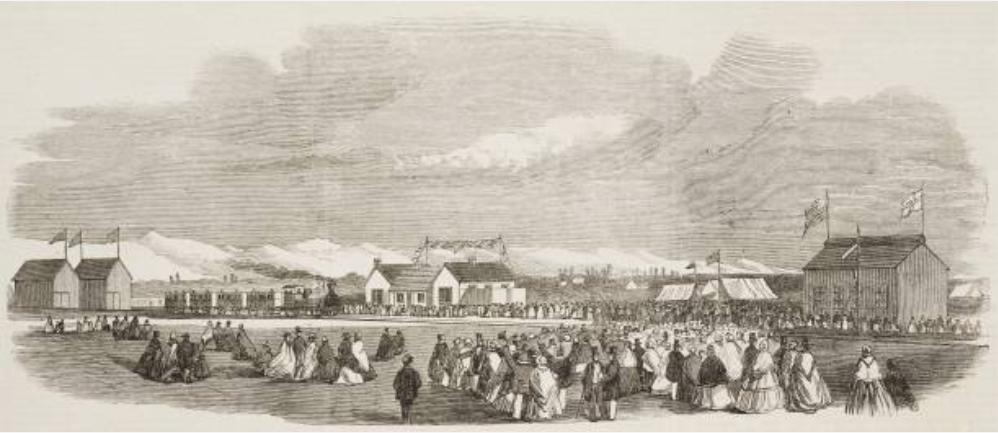
The opening of the first section of the railway line between Christchurch and Lyttelton at Ferrymead, December 1863.

==== Ferrymead Railway ====
The first railway to open in Christchurch was the Ferrymead railway, linking the province's main port with Christchurch, a distance of 7 km. With the opening of the Lyttelton rail tunnel in 1867 and subsequent rise of Lyttelton as the region's port, Ferrymead lost its importance and the railway was closed, having outlived its usefulness. The Ferrymead Railway is the first public railway in New Zealand to both open and close.

==== Little River Branch ====
The Little River Branch, connecting with the Southbridge Branch at Lincoln Junction, was originally intended to reach Akaroa but only made it as far as Little River. It was built to access one of only two major stands of timber at the time.

==== Main North Line ====
The Main North Line was built to serve many purposes: to provide suburban passenger services to Christchurch; transport rural settlers and their produce from agricultural areas to the north of Christchurch; and eventually provide a link to the areas of Marlborough, Nelson and the West Coast. For many years debate raged as to the best route for the railway to connect with Marlborough, with two lines extending north from Waipara. Eventually the coastal route was chosen and the Cheviot Branch (which actually terminated in Parnassus) was extended north to meet the line from Picton at Kaikoura in 1945 while the Waiau Branch's importance declined.

==== Main South Line ====
The Main South Line was constructed to link the port at Lyttelton to Christchurch and to agricultural areas in the Selwyn District. Construction work ceased while work on the Lyttelton tunnel proceeded, and did not restart until the central government became involved. Once under central government control, the line was deemed a high-priority public work and construction re-commenced on extending the line south towards Dunedin.

==== Oxford Branch ====
The Oxford Branch line was constructed to connect the town of Rangiora to agricultural areas to the west. The line originally connected with the Midland Line at Sheffield (Malvern) and was intended to have been the northern section of a proposed Canterbury Interior Line. The section between Sheffield and Oxford closed in 1930, with the remainder closed in 1959.

==== Riccarton Racecourse Siding ====
The Riccarton Racecourse Siding was a privately owned, 1.4 kilometres (0.87 mi) long siding. It left the Main South Line just west of Sockburn Railway Station by curving north, then near the racecourse curved to the west to terminate within the racecourse grounds. It was constructed and owned by the Canterbury Jockey Club to boost attendance at their race meetings, and operated from 1877 to 1954.

==== Southbridge Branch ====
The Southbridge Branch was originally built to connect rich grain-producing areas on the South Canterbury Plains with Christchurch and connected with the Main South Line in Christchurch at Hornby. Now, only a small portion of the line remains to serve industrial interests in the Hornby/Sockburn area of Christchurch and is known as the Hornby Industrial Line.

=== Operations ===
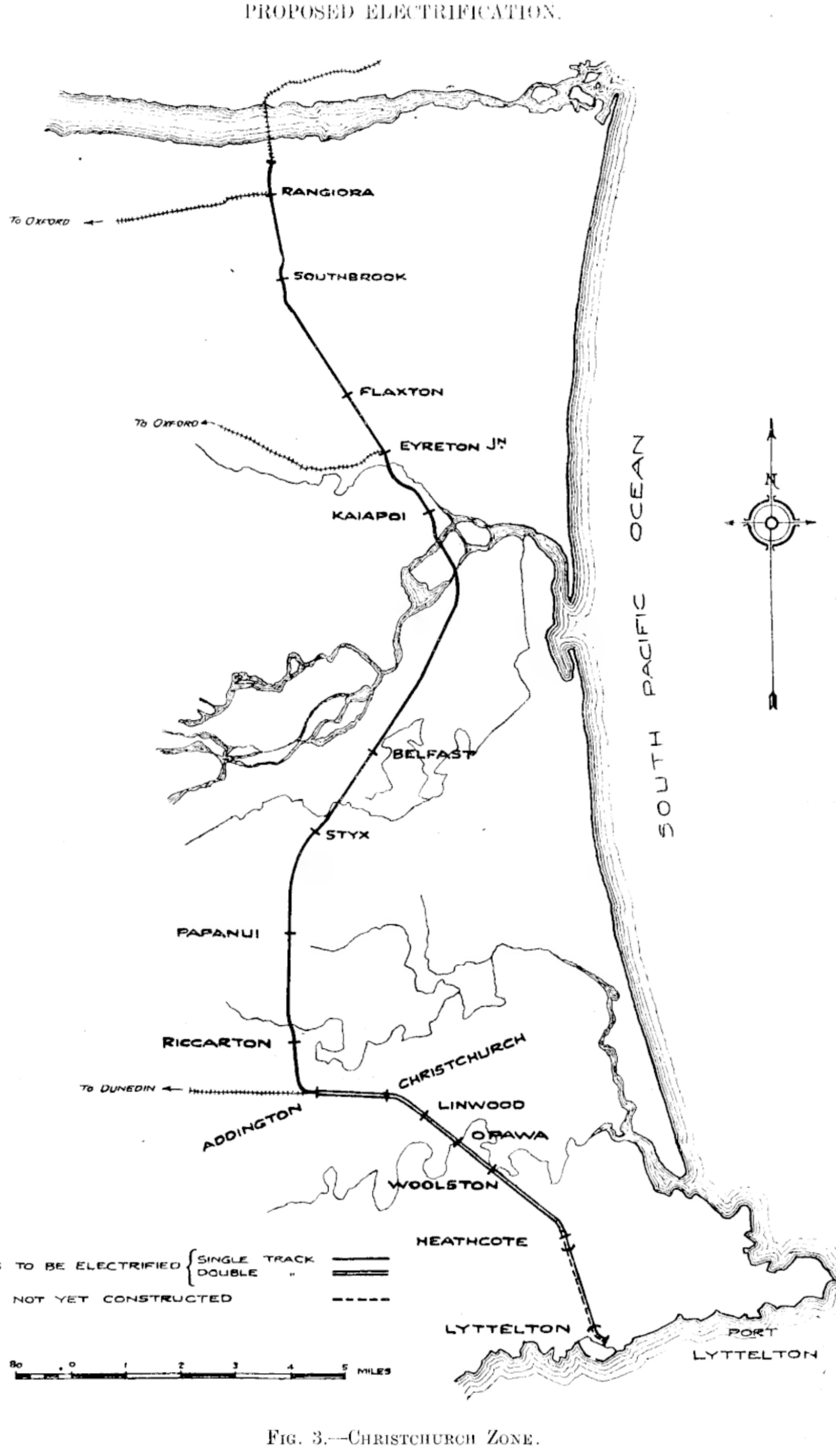
1926 Christchurch electrification proposals

Up to the 1950s, much of the freight traffic in Canterbury involved services between rural areas and the major centres and ports. Manufactured imports were distributed mainly from Christchurch and Dunedin, with agricultural produce exported from Port Chalmers, Oamaru, Timaru and Lyttelton. The South Island Main Trunk connected the major centres to the branch lines rather than handling long-haul traffic. Since the 1950s, with the decline in the branch line network, the role of the South Island Main Trunk has changed with it now handling predominantly long-haul freight, a change brought about in part by the containerisation of freight handling and the inter-island ferries.

Suburban and regional passenger services have operated to termini including Ferrymead, Lyttelton, Rolleston, Burnham, Whitecliffs, Springfield, Little River, Southbridge, Rangiora, and Ashburton. Some of these services were mixed trains, with both passenger carriages and goods wagons, and these generally operated where passenger trains could not be justified given the patronage. Such trains were operated to destinations including Little River, Southbridge and Springfield. The services to Lyttelton, Rangiora, and Ashburton were operated with locomotive-hauled passenger trains. From 1926 to 1934, an Edison battery-electric railcar operated passenger services between Christchurch and Little River. Occasional special or excursion trains operated to take passengers to picnics, race meetings or other social functions.

As the South Island rail network was gradually extended and eventually completed, various long-distance passenger services were introduced and replaced. Early long-distance services included the Culverden Express; the South Express, a Christchurch-Invercargill service inaugurated following the completion of the Main South Line; and the West Coast Express, which connected to the West Coast of the South Island. Some of these services were later replaced with railcars as steam was phased out; others with new services which, it was hoped, would revitalise the flagging fortunes of those routes. Such was the case with the South Express, which were replaced with the prestigious South Island Limited in 1949, and the Southerner in 1970. The Picton Express was introduced in 1945 upon completion of the Main North Line and, following a period during which railcars ran on this route, was superseded by the Coastal Pacific. Following a replacement railcar service, the West Coast Expresses was superseded by the TranzAlpine. The Coastal Pacific and the TranzAlpine are the only passenger trains to depart from Christchurch.

Following the success of the electrification of the Midland Line between Arthur's Pass and Otira, it was decided in 1925 to introduce electrification to Lyttelton. On 14 February 1929, the electrified line was opened using a 1.5 kV DC system, with an electrical substation at Woolston. This was originally intended to be the first stage of a larger plan for Christchurch passenger services. Six EC class electric locomotives operated passenger services between Christchurch and Lyttelton, until reaching the end of their working lives in 1970, with the last electric train service running on 19 September 1970. With the withdrawal from service of the EC locomotives, the electrification was removed as the cost of purchasing replacement locomotives and maintaining the electric infrastructure could not be justified. The Electric Traction Group based at the Ferrymead Historic Park has preserved and returned to operational status locomotive EC 7.

Suburban passenger services in Christchurch were eventually cancelled due to lack of patronage. By 1951, the mixed trains to Little River and Southbridge had disappeared, with the Ashburton passenger service following in 1958 and the last run of a mixed train to Springfield in June 1968. With the opening of the Lyttelton road tunnel in 1964, patronage of passenger trains to Lyttelton slowly declined to the point where it was remarked that the number of passengers using the trains could easily be accommodated on a bus. This soon became the case, with the Christchurch–Lyttelton services ended on 28 February 1972. The Christchurch–Rangiora services were cancelled four years later on 30 April 1976, and the steamer express connections between Lyttelton and Christchurch followed on 14 September 1976, with cancellation of the overnight Wellington–Lyttelton inter-island ferries.

=== Facilities ===
Papanui Railway Station, December 2019

==== Railway Stations ====
Only one passenger railway station remains in regular use in Christchurch city (excluding museum operations), near the junction of the Main South Line and Main North Line in the suburb of Addington. KiwiRail Scenic services also use the stations in Rangiora and Rolleston in the neighbouring districts of Waimakariri and Selwyn, respectively. Lyttelton station is occasionally used for charter services, though it no longer has a rail-served platform. Most suburban stations closed with the suburban passenger trains, though a few have remained as freight-only hubs in industrial areas. Some buildings and other amenities from closed stations remain: Lyttelton and Papanui stations are still in situ. Of most of the closed stations, no obvious signs remain.

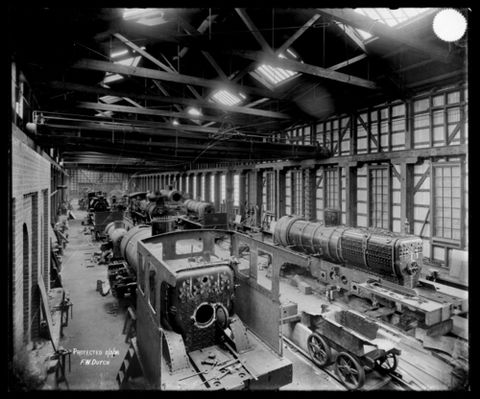
Addington Railway Workshops, May 1898

==== Addington Railway Workshops ====
The Addington Railway Workshops were a major New Zealand Railways facility for the manufacture and maintenance of rolling stock. Opened in 1880, they continued to serve until deemed surplus to requirements and closed in 1990. Today, the Tower Junction Shopping Centre and Christchurch railway station occupy the site, and the original water tower used by the workshops in the days of steam remains in situ.

== Today ==
Containers heading towards Lyttelton Port in Woolston, December 2020

=== Freight ===
Freight is the mainstay of rail traffic in Christchurch. Rail freight handling has been centralised at the Middleton freight terminal which opened in 1998. Industrial areas in Sockburn and Woolston also serve as rail freight hubs. Prior to the opening of the Middleton freight terminal, freight was shunted between several sites along the Main South Line through Christchurch. Opportunities for providing inter-modal services are being considered at expanding industrial areas in Islington, Rolleston and Southbrook, with possibilities also being considered in the Marsh/Shands and Chaneys areas.

Work on a new Waltham Mechanical Hub to centralise maintenance began in 2020, with demolishtion of the old facility beginning in 2021. On 24 April 2026, the new mechanical hub was opened by the Minister for Rail, Winston Peters.

Christchurch railway station, January 2026

=== Passenger ===
Two long-distance passenger services operate from Christchurch: the TranzAlpine to Greymouth and the Coastal Pacific to Picton with departures each morning, returning in the evening. Occasional steam-hauled excursion trains are operated by Mainline Steam Heritage Trust.

According to Environment Canterbury (ECan), Christchurch geography and public transport usage patterns mean that public transport is currently best served with a bus-based system. In anticipation of future growth they are intending to consider other transport modes with preliminary investigations due in 2008. Other transport modes to be investigated, such as heavy rail or new light rail systems, are expected to meet several performance criteria before they can be considered as options for future public transport requirements. Also suggested has been a hybrid bus/rail system which makes use of the existing heavy rail network around Christchurch to provide services to satellite towns with vehicles that are also able to run off the rails in a guided busway.

The purchase of the rail operations division of Toll NZ by the New Zealand Government has revived hope of the return of a commuter rail service to Christchurch, linking the city to satellite towns such as Lyttelton, Rangiora and Rolleston. While heavy rail is still considered to be the best long-term option, cost and population remain significant obstacles to the implementation of this option. Rolleston's predicted growth to 50,000 residents is expected to be a population level at which rail could be considered viable, but it has been noted that in both the Wellington and Auckland regions where commuter rail networks are in operation that these services are often not viable without a government subsidy.

Severe traffic congestion for commuters from the Waimakariri District into Christchurch as a result of significant population growth in North Canterbury towns post-earthquakes of 2010–2011 prompted ECan to consider the possibility of a commuter rail service between Rangiora and Christchurch. Such a service would have been regarded as a temporary measure until the long-term solution of motorway upgrades was completed. The Council agreed to spend $20,000 on a feasibility study to examine the costs and various other issues involved. Upon review of the ECan commissioned report, the New Zealand Transport Agency Waka Kotahi (NZTA) rejected the proposal citing cost and the availability of the necessary infrastructure as major concerns.

=== Reports ===
==== 2005 ====
In August 2005, a small-scale study involving three focus groups was conducted to gauge public interest in commuter rail for Christchurch. The study concluded that there was interest in the idea if service expectations could be met. An Environment Canterbury commissioned discussion paper (Sinclair Knight Merz: The Future of Public Transport in Christchurch Discussion Paper, June 2004) concluded that priority should be given to bus-based public transport, but that future planning should include provision for other public transport options. A report commissioned in 2005 by Environment Canterbury from consultants GHD Limited (Network Level Investigative Report – Proposed Introduction of Commuter Rail Services to Christchurch City and Environs, June 2005) suggested that commuter rail would involve substantial costs and further investigation would be needed to determine what the requirements are.

Following a meeting held by Environment Canterbury in April 2005 to discuss options for passenger rail in Christchurch, engineering consultants GHD Limited were commissioned to prepare a report. The purpose of the report was to investigate the options discussed, and provide estimates of the capital and operational costs involved. Five options were included in the final report:

Option 1 envisaged utilising the existing network and the introduction of frequent services between Lyttelton and Islington, with more limited services south to Rolleston/Darfield and north to Rangiora. Little or no new track would be laid, though upgrades to existing track were expected. Also required would be the purchase of passenger rolling stock and the construction of new stations.

Option 2, as with Option 1_{,} would involve the introduction of frequent services between Lyttelton and Islington, as well as frequent services between Belfast and Islington. In addition to the double tracking of the Main North Line to Belfast, there would also be a need to upgrade Addington Junction, with a possible requirement to also upgrade existing track.

Option 3, as with Option 2, would involve the introduction of frequent services between Lyttelton and Islington, in addition to frequent services between Rangiora and Islington. Limited services would be provided south of Islington, and an upgrade of the Rangiora station would be included to cater for commuters from Woodend. Track works would include double tracking the Main North Line from Addington Junction to Rangiora and an upgrade of Addington Junction.

Option 4 would involve the introduction of frequent services between Lyttelton and Rolleston/Darfield, as well as frequent services between Rangiora and Rolleston/Darfield. Also suggested was the possibility of reopening closed branch lines to encourage the growth of, or a reduction in traffic to and from areas such as Prebbleton (formerly on the Southbridge Branch) and Oxford (formerly on the Oxford Branch). Track works would include new layouts at Addington and Rolleston, as well as the double tracking of the Main South Line out to Rolleston and the double tracking of the Main North Line out to Rangiora.

Option 5, as with Option 4, would have double tracking and resignalling from Rangiora and Rolleston. Services would also be provided to a central city station via an underground loop. This option was regarded as unviable, and not considered for future study.

==== 2007 ====
In terms of passenger rail, Environment Canterbury has carried out a number of investigations into heavy rail over recent years with no specific proposals eventuating. Notwithstanding, a further study into the long term future of passenger transport in Greater Christchurch (in response to the UDS) is about to be commissioned as this report concludes, and that will consider all potential modes for passenger transport including various road and rail-based options.

— Canterbury Transport Regional Implementation Plan 2008–2038

The only rail activities identified in the plan are those that local authorities or developers are funding to facilitate economic growth. The current focus of rail in Canterbury has for some time been on bulk freight including developing the use of rail for freight through in-land ports.

— Canterbury Transport Regional Implementation Plan 2008–2038

A 2007 consultation report "Christchurch Rolleston Transportation Study" found that 9% of the people who provided feedback wanted rail to have a greater role in the transport network and were concerned about the possibility of losing future options for developing rail links. One of the conclusions of the study was that rail is not a viable option for public transport within the scope of the study (until 2021). In December 2007, the Selwyn District Council approved the Christchurch, Rolleston and Environs Transportation Study, of which a key component is the protection of the railway corridor between Rolleston and central Christchurch for future commuter use.

Pete Hodgson, as Minister for Transport, indicated that, providing passenger rail is incorporated into the Regional Land Transport Strategy, central government would be prepared to meet 60% of the costs of purchasing rolling stock and extending infrastructure if so required, and noted that the initiative is consistent with the National Rail Strategy.

==== 2021 ====
A 2021 report commissioned by local councils and NZTA established that by 2048, there would be significant population levels that future investigations into rapid transit. It investigated three options for modes of transport: light rail, rapid bus, and heavy rail, and three scenarios for transport corridors: using the existing heavy rail network and existing street, north and southwest of Christchurch. All three scenarios concluded that a higher popualtion density around the transport corridors was needed to sustain the patronage of the modes, with a cost ranging from NZ$1.8b to NZ$4.4b.

=== 2013–2021 ===
In 2013, some residents speculated on a possible commuter rail transport system for Christchurch. Furthermore in the lead up to the 2014 and 2017 general elections, Labour announced as part of its manifesto a proposal to reintroduce passenger commuter services north and south (2014) or south (2017) of Christchurch. There have been other proposals to reintroduce commuter passenger services north and/or south of Christchurch. In May 2021, Minister of Transport Michael Wood said that the government was keen to get rapid transit in the form of Light Rail or Bus Corridors moving in Christchurch.

=== 2022–present ===
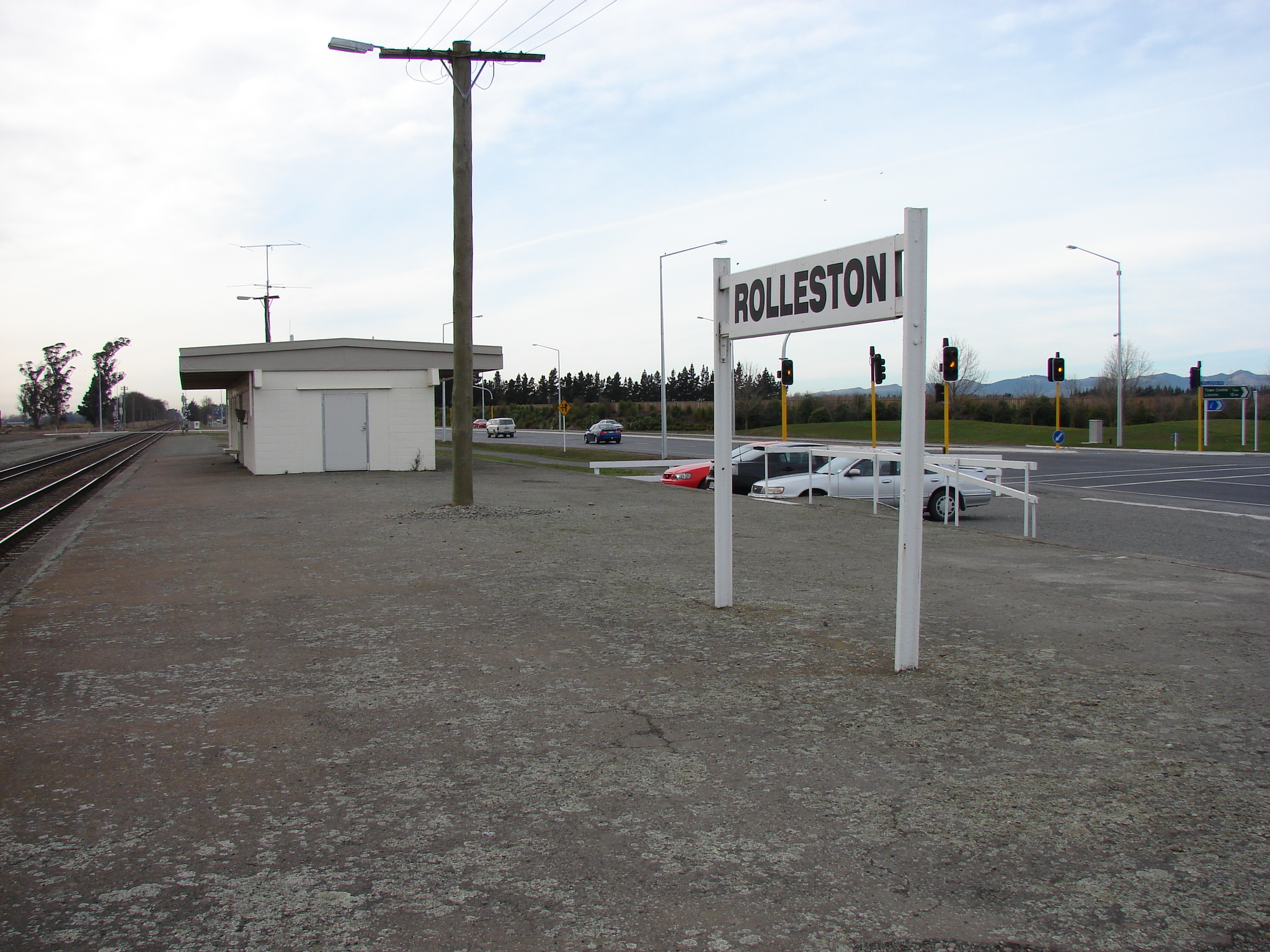
Rolleston railway station, July 2007

On 16 February 2022, Environment Canterbury (ECan) had voted unanimously to ask the Canterbury Regional Transport Committee (comprising Canterbury mayors, representatives from ECan, and NZTA) to establish a working group to "investigate opportunities to progress passenger rail in Canterbury". ECan councillor and Regional Transport Committee chair Peter Scott said that it could run from Christchurch to Rolleston and as far north as Amberley.

Two days later, Canterbury's mayors asked the committee for more information before agreeing to a notice of motion. Instead of forming a working group, the committee voted to request a report from staff before their next meeting in May 2022 and that the report would have to outline costs, funding mechanisms, and how it lined up with similar projects. According to councillor Scott, the additions were added as it would have cause the notice of motion to fail and the opportunity lost. Deputy chair Tane Apanui, who put forward the original notice of motion, mentioned the changes had watered it down slightly.

On 9 August 2025, Mainland Rail announced it had purchased former Auckland Transport ADL/ADC class DMUs to be used for transporting people to Te Kaha Stadium during concert and sporting events, creating a "special events express". The first express service took place on 24 April 2026 for the opening of the stadium, travelling from Rolleston railway station to a temporary platform at Pilgrim Place. Future services carrying up to 5,700 passengers per event and travelling as far as Ashburton and Rangiora have also been prosposed by Mainland Rail for such events.

In the lead up to the 2026 general election, Minister of Rail and New Zealand First Leader Winston Peters, announced a policy to commit to a twelve-month commuter trial from Rolleston to Central Christchurch, as well as bringing back The Southerner. Green Party co-leader Marama Davidson, also announced a NZ$4b rail policy which included reinstating The Southerner. On 20 October 2026, Christchurch Mayor Phil Mauger said he wanted the city to help fund a $500,000 permanent platform on Pilgrim Place for the initiation of the commuter trial and for Mainland Rail's events express services.

On 1 November 2026, Winston Peters announced a twelve-month commuter trial between Rolleston, Rangiora, and central Christchurch, beginning in mid-2027. The $3.4m deal between Mainland Rail, Regional Development Fund (combined $1.7m) and local councils (the remaining $1.7m) would also secure the return of The Southerner between Christchurch, Ashburton, Timaru, Oamaru, Dunedin, Gore and Invercargill.

=== Heritage operations ===
Several rail heritage organisations are based in Christchurch, most of which were established to preserve rolling stock from the steam era. The most well-known of these organisations, the Canterbury Railway Society, operates the Ferrymead Railway at the Ferrymead Heritage Park with steam, diesel, and electric motive power. It also has a large collection of stored or restored heritage rolling stock on site, as well as several rail-related facilities including workshops and two stations.

Other rail heritage organisations in Christchurch include Canterbury Steam Preservation Society and Mainline Steam.

== See also ==
- Environment Canterbury
- Lyttelton railway tunnel
- KiwiRail, national rail operator.
- The Great Journeys of New Zealand, long-distance passenger services.
