= South Line, Christchurch =

Former local passenger services south of Christchurch, New Zealand

South Line
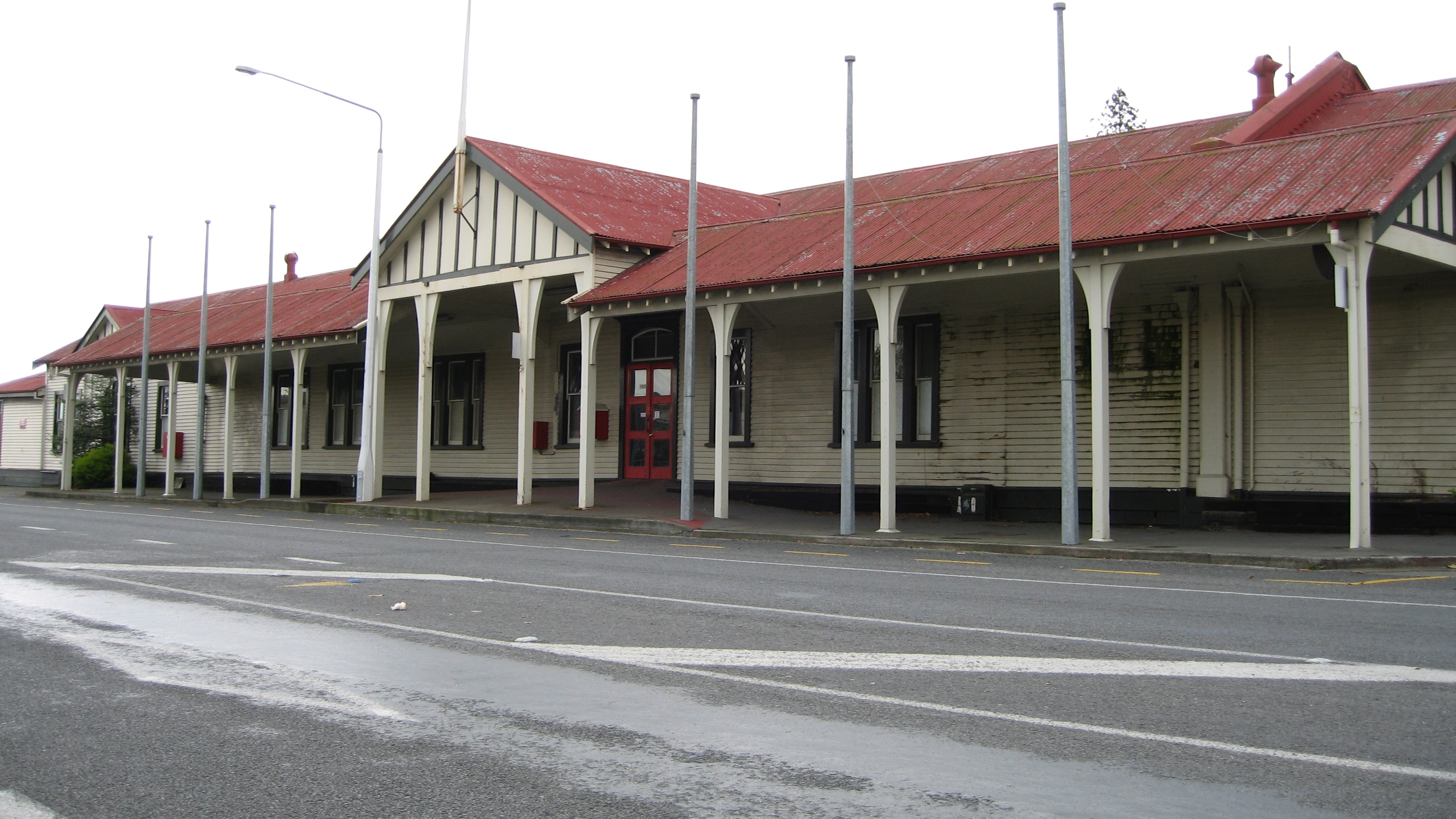
- Ashburton railway station before it was demolished in 2013

Overview
- Service type: Commuter rail
- System: Public transport in Christchurch
- Status: Discontinued
- Locale: Christchurch, Selwyn District and Mid Canterbury
- Last service: December 1967 (Burnham)
- Former operator: New Zealand Railways Department

Route
- Termini: Christchurch; Ashburton; Islington, Rolleston and Burnham (workers' train)
- Line used: Main South Line

Technical
- Rolling stock: Steam locomotives
- Track gauge: 1,067 mm (3 ft 6 in)

South Line was the name for the local passenger service that New Zealand Railways ran south of Christchurch on the Main South Line to Ashburton, and out to Burnham and other places in Canterbury, New Zealand.

Two varieties of service were provided: a workers' train that carried factory workers out of the city to Islington and later Burnham, the opposite of the normal commuter flow (an inverse commute), and mixed and passenger trains between Christchurch and Ashburton, running in both directions in the morning, midday and afternoon.

The last Ashburton passenger trains were discontinued in 1958, and the last workers' train to Burnham ran in December 1967.

More recently there have been calls for the South Line to be brought back, and the government has announced a 12-month commuter trial from Rolleston, due to start in mid-2027.

South Line services in 1957
Station	Burnham	Ashburton
◼ Christchurch	⬤	⬤
◼ Addington	⬤	◌
◻ Middleton	◌	|
◼ Sockburn	◌	◌
◼ Hornby	◌	◌
◼ Islington	◌	◌
◼ Templeton	◌	◌
◼ Weedons	◌	◌
◼ Rolleston	◌	⬤
◼ Burnham	⬤	⬤
◻ Norwood		◌
◻ Selwyn		◌
◼ Dunsandel		◌
◻ Bankside		◌
◼ Rakaia		⬤
◼ Chertsey		◌
◼ Dromore		◌
◻ Fairfield		◌
◼ Ashburton		⬤

Legend — Stop type

- ◼ Station
- ◻ Halt

Legend — Stopping patterns

- ⬤ – Trains stop
- ◌ – Stops if required
- | – Trains pass and do not stop

== Workers' train ==
=== Background ===
Industrial workers who lived in central Christchurch or in Sydenham travelled out along the Main South Line to factories built beside the railway. These factories processed agricultural produce from the Canterbury Plains, which was then exported through Lyttelton. The largest employer was the freezing works at Islington, opened by the Christchurch Meat Company in 1889, which employed about 500 people by 1896. A second freezing works opened beside Hornby railway station in 1896. Other employers on the line included the Air Force's depot at Weedons. The line later also served the Burnham Military Camp.

=== Islington, Templeton and Rolleston ===
Local passenger services on the line began on a small scale. Trains ran from Christchurch to Hornby by 1879. Over the following year several services were added and withdrawn, including an evening train that ran from May 1879 until February 1880, and by April 1880 the timetable had a morning and an afternoon train. In August 1896 the Hornby train was replaced by a workers' train that continued on to Islington, leaving Christchurch in the morning and returning in the afternoon, carrying workers along the Main South Line to the factories.

In October 1911 extra commuter trains were introduced between Templeton and Christchurch as a trial, bringing people into the city in the morning and home in the evening. In 1912 the Railway Department decided to reduce the service because of insufficient passenger traffic, but local residents objected strongly, and the Minister of Railways replied that he had decided "to continue the service in the meantime as a further experiment". Patronage remained low, and the trains were withdrawn in early 1913.

By 1915 a new service had been trialled as far as Rolleston, but from 1917 it was reduced to Islington. Late Saturday night trains also ran between Christchurch and Templeton from 1917 until 1919, leaving Christchurch at 10:30 pm and returning from Templeton at 11:15 pm. The Saturday service between Christchurch and Islington was discontinued in 1946.

=== Reversing to Islington ===
Islington had no turntable, so the locomotive had to run in reverse in one direction, which slowed the service. In June 1930 the workers' train, running in reverse at about 35 miles per hour (56 km/h), collided with a car at a level crossing at Sockburn, and the engine driver and the five people in the car were killed. The coroner found that running the engine in reverse increased the danger, and that the practice had contributed to the driver's death. The lack of a turntable at Islington, together with requests from people further out along the line, probably led to the service being extended to Rolleston and later Burnham.

=== Burnham ===
==== Wartime trains ====
During the Second World War, special Sunday trains ran from Christchurch to the military camp at Burnham from 1940, carrying soldiers and visitors. Weekday trains also ran to serve the camp, including for visitors and civilian staff. The weekday trains were cancelled in February 1946, and the Sunday visitors' trains were discontinued later that year.

==== Islington to Burnham ====
The 1946 cancellation attracted strong public opposition, and following a campaign the Islington workers' train was extended to Burnham in December 1949. It ran from Monday to Friday, leaving Christchurch at 7:25 am and returning from Burnham at 4:40 pm, a journey of about 45 minutes. It called at Addington, Middleton, Hornby and Islington, and elsewhere where required, although Middleton ceased to be a stop towards the end of the service. It carried workers from Sockburn, Hornby and Islington, the Air Force's depot at Weedons, and staff at the camp. Locomotive engineers referred to the service as the Burnham Flyer. The last trains ran on 22 December 1967, and the service was discontinued from the following Monday.

== Christchurch–Ashburton trains ==
Waipara train streams out of Christchurch station past waiting Ashburton train, 1950

Trains ran between Christchurch and Ashburton from the time the Main South Line reached Ashburton, and in 1897 a public meeting at Ashburton petitioned for faster trains. Until 1927 the Ashburton-based morning train to Christchurch, and its evening return, were mixed trains carrying both goods and passengers. From February 1927 this pair became a passenger train on weekdays, while the Christchurch-based morning train to Ashburton, and its afternoon return, remained mixed. The trains connected at Rakaia with the Methven branch.

The service was frequently criticised for its slow speed, with petitions and complaints from the 1890s to the 1950s. It nevertheless enabled residents of Ashburton to travel to Christchurch for shopping and business that could not be conducted in Ashburton.

Christchurch–Ashburton local trains, 1927 to 1949
Train	Direction	Type
7:10 am	Christchurch to Ashburton	Mixed
8:15 am	Ashburton to Christchurch	Passenger
11:10 am (weekdays)	Ashburton to Christchurch	Mixed
Saturday midday (from 1935)	Ashburton to Christchurch	Mixed
3:50 pm	Ashburton to Christchurch	Mixed
4:57 pm	Christchurch to Ashburton	Passenger

Christchurch–Ashburton local trains, 1950 to 1958
Train	Direction	Type
8:15 am	Ashburton to Christchurch	Passenger
Saturday 11:15 am (until 1956)	Ashburton to Christchurch	Mixed
4:15 pm	Christchurch to Ashburton	Passenger

=== Withdrawal ===
In 1949 the weekday midday train from Ashburton ceased to carry passengers. From December 1949 the Christchurch-based morning and afternoon mixed trains also ceased to carry passengers. Ashburton passengers were transferred to a New Zealand Railways bus service, while those in the Christchurch area were served by the Islington workers' train, which was extended to Burnham on the same date. The Saturday train was discontinued in 1956. The last passenger trains between Christchurch and Ashburton, the morning service to Christchurch and the afternoon service to Ashburton, were discontinued in September 1958 and replaced by buses owing to low patronage. Long-distance trains continued to provide rail travel between the two towns.

== Other services ==
Long-distance trains to and from Timaru, Dunedin and Invercargill, and trains on the line to Springfield, ran alongside the local services.

== Today ==
Peak-hour traffic between Rolleston and Christchurch has prompted calls for the South Line to be brought back. In 2025, Environment Canterbury proposed a commuter train from Rolleston into Christchurch. The government has also funded a 12-month trial, run by Mainland Rail, with morning and evening services between Rolleston and central Christchurch, due to start in mid-2027. The trip from Rolleston is expected to take less than 20 minutes by rail, compared with 50 minutes by road.
