= Rolleston railway station, New Zealand =

Railway station in Rolleston, New Zealand

Rolleston
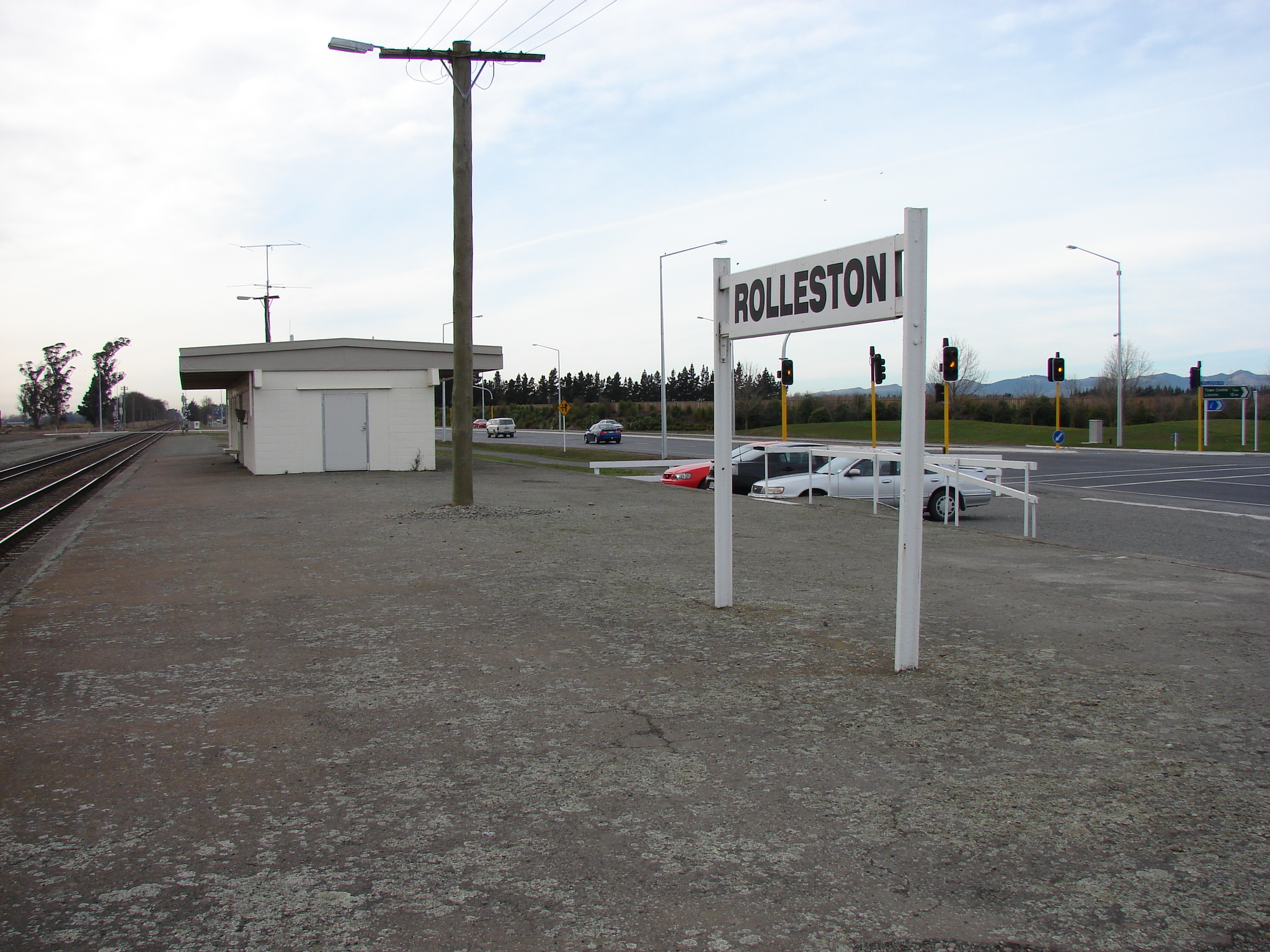
- Rolleston railway station platform and building, looking north-east

General information
- Location: Rolleston; New Zealand
- Coordinates: 43.588750°S 172.383694°E
- Lines: Main South Line; Midland Line
- Distance: Lyttelton 32.43 km (20.15 mi)
- Platforms: 1
- Tracks: 2

History
- Opened: 16 October 1866
- Rebuilt: 1923, 1969

Services
| Preceding station | Great Journeys New Zealand | Following station |
|---|---|---|
| Christchurch Terminus | TranzAlpine | Darfield towards Greymouth |
| Preceding station | Mainland Rail | Following station |
| Christchurch Terminus | Mainlander | Timaru towards Invercargill |

Historic railways
| Preceding station | Historical railways | Following station |
|---|---|---|
| Weedons; Line open, station closed | South Line; NZR | Burnham; Line open, station closed |
| Templeton; Line open, station closed | Springfield Mixed; NZR | Sandy Knolls; Line open, station closed |
Location

Rolleston railway station is a railway station in Rolleston, in the Selwyn District of Canterbury, New Zealand. It stands on the Main South Line at its junction with the Midland Line. It opened in 1866 as the first terminus of the Great Southern Railway. It is currently served by KiwiRail's long-distance TranzAlpine and by Mainland Rail's Mainlander. The building on the site, which opened in 1969, is boarded up and closed to the public; passengers join and leave trains at the platform.

== History ==
=== Opening ===
Rolleston was named after William Rolleston, who as a member of the Canterbury Provincial Council advocated a railway through the centre of Canterbury, with a town on the line that would be the terminus for lines going west and east. Construction of the Great Southern Railway, built by Canterbury Provincial Railways to the 5 ft 3 in (1,600 mm) broad gauge, began in 1865, and the line was officially opened as far as Rolleston on 13 October 1866 by the provincial superintendent, William Moorhouse. The town grew up around the railway, and William Rolleston, for whom the station and the town were named, was not at the opening. The station served as the post office from the start, with the stationmaster acting as postmaster until 1959.

=== Junction ===
In 1874 the line to Sheffield opened from Rolleston as a branch, built to the narrower 3 ft 6 in (1,070 mm) gauge, and it later became part of the Midland Line. The change of gauge meant that all passengers and freight travelling to and from the west had to change trains at Rolleston. The Midland Line was completed in 1923, and with much larger trains now running on it the station was rebuilt on a new site.

=== Station buildings ===
According to a previous stationmaster, Rolleston has had five station buildings over the years: a shed in 1866, a more permanent building in 1868, one built about 1880 in the fork between the main line and the Sheffield branch (the original part of the Midland Line), one opened in 1923 on a new site, and the present building opened in 1969.

The 1923 station was destroyed by fire late on 4 February 1967, after a small fire in the outer wall of the women's lavatory had been put out the previous week. The fire was believed to have started at the end of the building nearest Christchurch, and firefighters from Burnham Military Camp and Rolleston saved the building holding the signalling equipment. Arson was suspected, but never proved.

The replacement station was opened on 17 March 1969. It is of concrete block construction, 72 ft (22 m) long and 15 ft (5 m) wide, with verandahs along both sides, and contained a signalling room, waiting room, booking hall, public toilets and an office housing the signals control panel. It is about half the size of the building it replaced.

=== decline ===
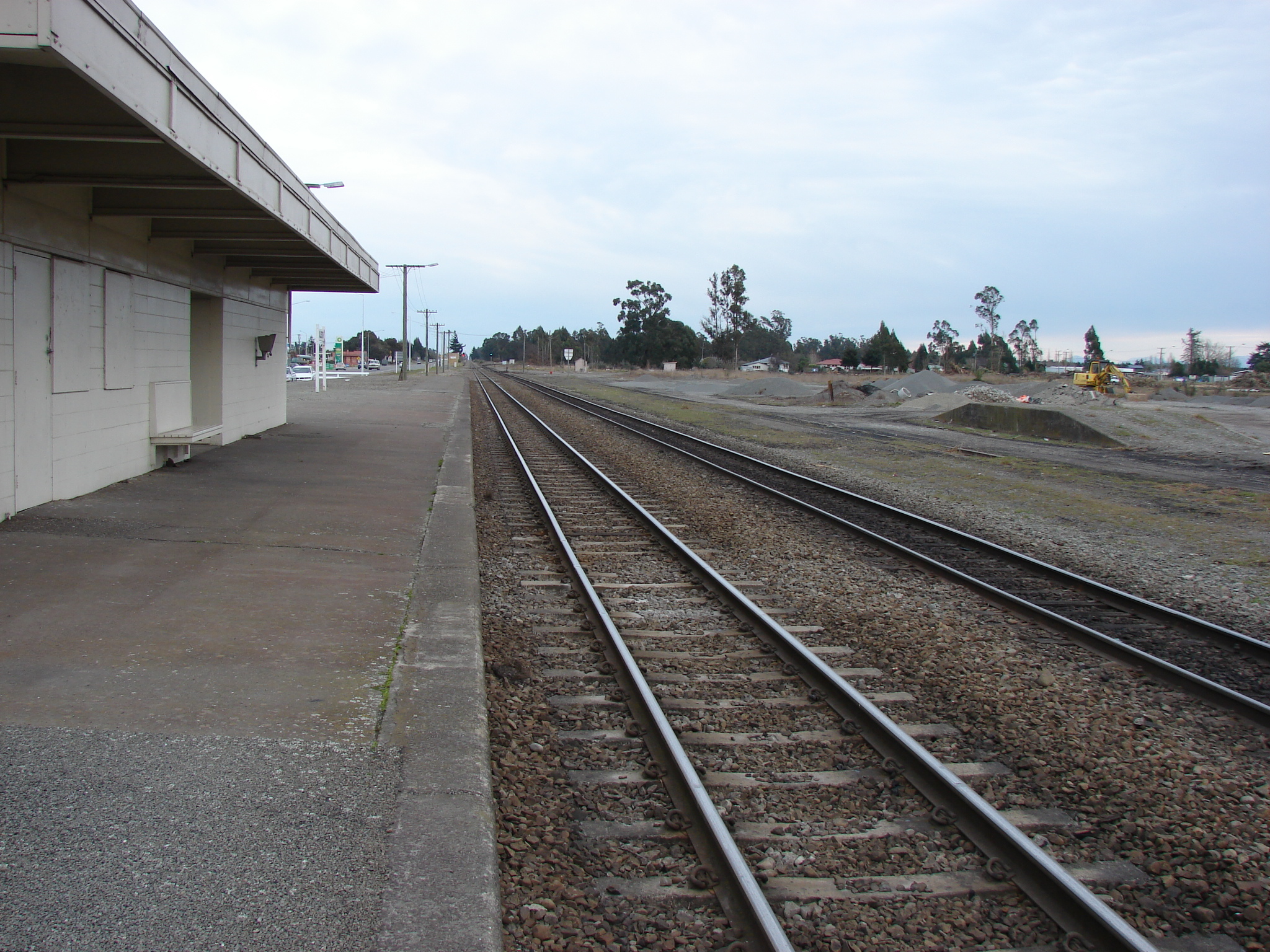
Rolleston station yard, looking south in the direction of the Midland Line junction.

Rolleston was a major shunting yard until about 1960, with trains for both the Main South Line and the Midland Line made up there, mostly at night. The yard had a goods shed and stock yards used for railing stud stock to the West Coast, but the stock yards were to be closed in 1968, and by 1970 almost all shunting and train marshalling had moved to Christchurch. By 1974 the Down Main on the south side of the platform had been lifted, leaving both main lines on the north side, and the footbridge and signal gantry had been removed.

The station became unmanned on 31 March 1989, as freight through Rolleston had fallen and ticket sales alone could not sustain it.

== Services ==
=== Current ===
The TranzAlpine, which runs between Christchurch and Greymouth, stops at Rolleston. Mainland Rail's Mainlander, which runs between Christchurch and Invercargill, also stops at Rolleston. In November 2026 the Government announced funding to move the Mainlander from monthly excursions to a regular timetable. Mainland Rail also runs express trains from Rolleston and Rangiora to events at the new One New Zealand Stadium in Christchurch, arranged with the event organisers; the main example is the Crusaders Express in 2026.

=== Historic ===
Rolleston was served by suburban and mixed trains from Christchurch, including the Ashburton Passenger, the Burnham Flyer and the Springfield Mixed. The Burnham Flyer ran from 1949 until its last journeys on Christmas Eve 1967, when road services buses replaced it. The Springfield Mixed, which called at all stations except Middleton, ended in December 1968.

=== Commuter rail ===
Christchurch's commuter rail services were phased out between the 1950s and 1970s. On 1 November 2026 the Government announced a 12-month commuter rail trial run by Mainland Rail between Rangiora, Rolleston and central Christchurch, with morning and evening services starting in mid-2027.

== Freight ==
Rolleston is a major freight centre. The inland ports at the Izone and iPort developments, including the Lyttelton Port Company's MidlandPort and MetroPort, are connected by sidings next to the yard, and container shuttle trains run daily between them and Lyttelton. See Izone, Rolleston.

== Accidents ==
On 25 August 1993 a southbound Southerner collided with a concrete mixer truck at the George Holmes Road level crossing at the south end of the station yard, killing three passengers. The crossing has since been removed.

== Station today and proposals ==
The 1969 building is boarded up and closed to the public. In 2013 the Selwyn Central Community Board asked residents for ideas to reuse it, and in 2014 it held a community conversation at the station to look at turning it into a welcoming facility. Neither led to any change to the building.

Rolleston has grown quickly, doubling in size since before the Canterbury earthquakes to about 20,000 people by 2022, and with congestion on the roads into Christchurch there have been both plans and proposals for a bus and rail interchange next to the station, in the 2014 town centre masterplan and in a 2022 proposal by the Carter Group linked to the planned road bridge, but none was built. Construction of the bridge, from Rolleston Drive to Jones Road, is due to begin in October 2026, and access to the station is to be maintained throughout the work.

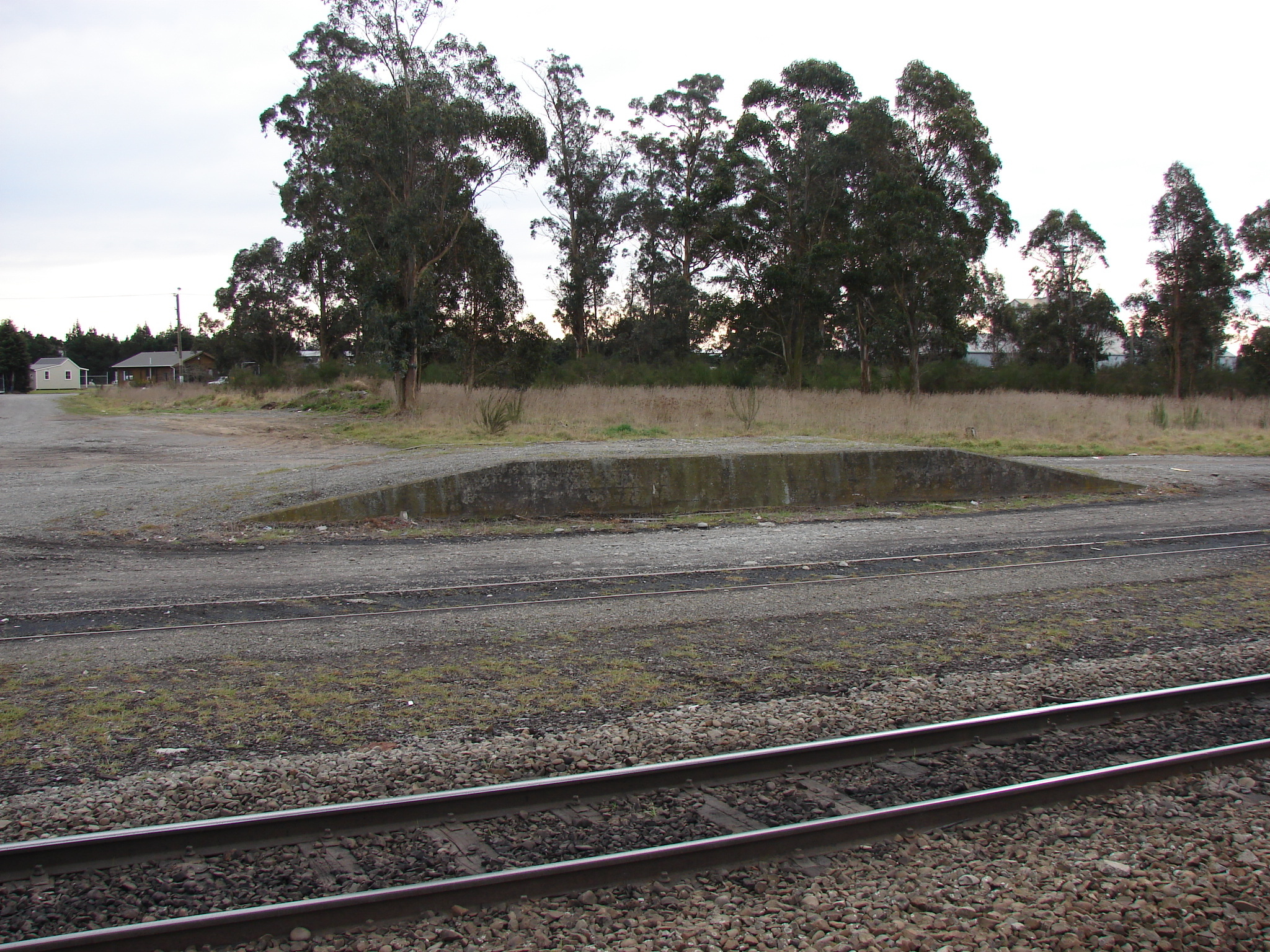
Loading bank.

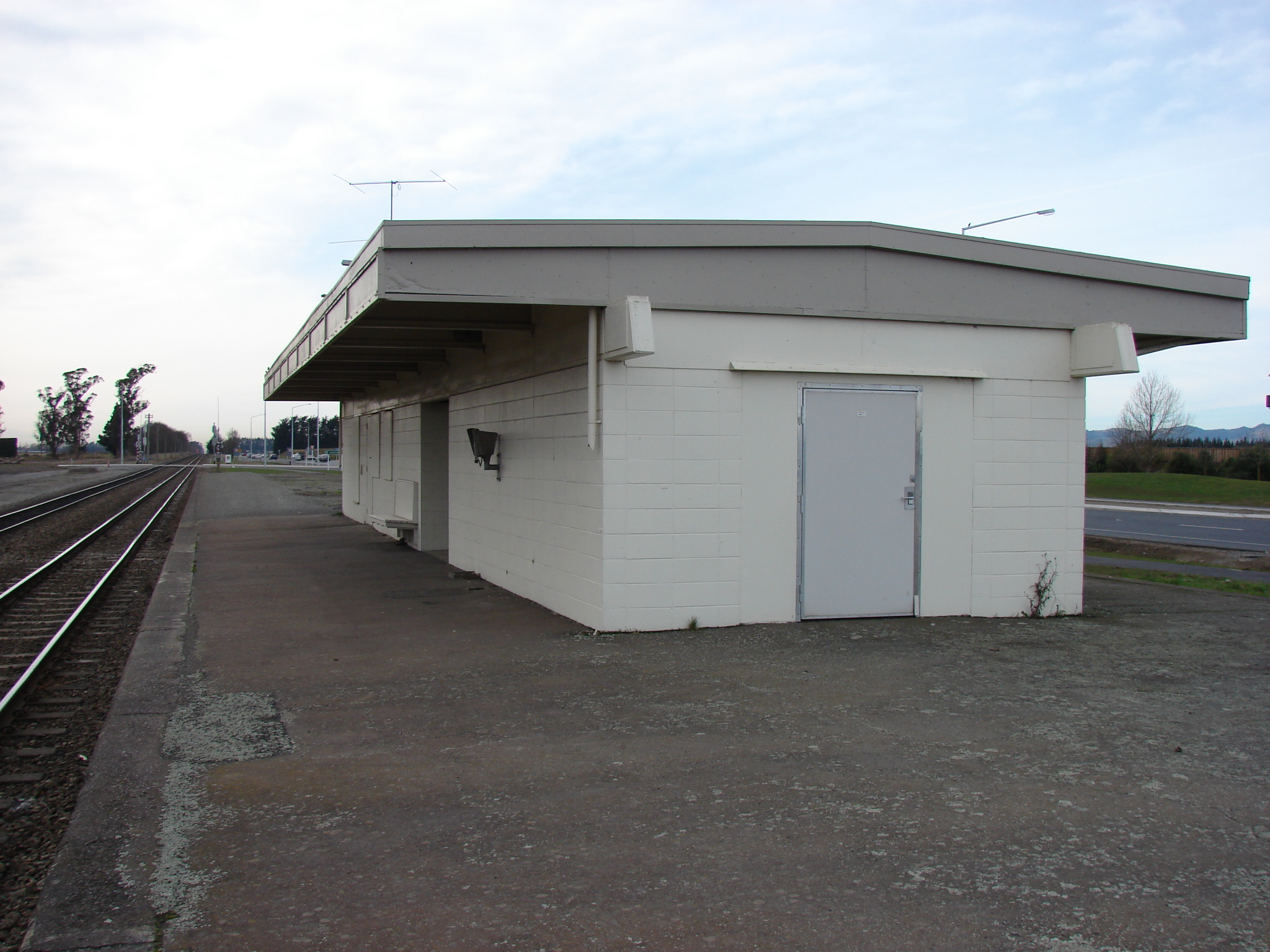
Station building.

== See also ==
- List of Christchurch railway stations
- Izone, Rolleston
