= Sockburn railway station =

Former railway station in Christchurch, New Zealand

Sockburn

General information
- Location: Sockburn, Christchurch
- Coordinates: 43°32′27.7″S 172°33′15.7″E
- Owner: New Zealand Railways Department
- Line: Main South Line
- Distance: 7 km from Christchurch (Moorhouse)
- Platforms: Island platform

History
- Opened: 13 October 1866
- Closed: March 1987
- Former names: Racecourse

Services
Preceding station	Historical railways	Following station
Middleton; Line open station closed	South Line; NZR	Hornby; Line open station closed
Terminus	Racecourse Siding; Private	Riccarton Racecourse; Line closed
Location

Sockburn railway station was a station on the Main South Line in Sockburn, a suburb of Christchurch, New Zealand. It opened in 1866 as Racecourse station, serving the racecourse at Riccarton, and was later known as Sockburn. From 1877 to 1954 it was the junction for the Canterbury Jockey Club's short branch railway into the racecourse, the Riccarton Racecourse Siding. The station was used by local passenger trains and goods traffic until it closed in 1987.

== History ==
=== Racecourse platform ===
The line from Christchurch to Rolleston opened in October 1866, with a station near the Riccarton racecourse open from the start. It was called Racecourse, and existed to serve race meetings. Trains ran direct from Christchurch to it on race days, and omnibuses and cabs waited at the platform to take passengers on to the course.

In May 1875 trains stopped calling at the Racecourse platform, and a new station at Racecourse Junction, where the Southbridge Branch left the main line, took over; it later became Hornby. In November 1877 the Canterbury Jockey Club opened its own branch railway into the course, which left the main line in the Sockburn yard, and trains were calling at Sockburn again by 1878. By 1879 the station was generally known as Sockburn.

=== Industry and goods traffic ===
In the early twentieth century Sockburn became a freight station as industry grew in the area. In January 1903 the Christchurch City Council bought about 45 acres in the triangle between the Main South Line and the racecourse branch for new abattoirs. The Railway Department moved the station to a new site a short distance further from Christchurch, and laid a siding to deliver stock to the abattoirs, with an extension for loading meat. The same year a deputation asked the Minister of Railways for horse trucking accommodation at the station, because horses for the racecourse had to be sent as far as Hornby. The new station building came into use in August 1903.

Goods traffic had been worked at Middleton, and the station began accepting it in June 1909. By 1911 the loading bank was too small for the business, and the Minister of Railways agreed to extend it by more than 12 metres.

=== Level crossing and overbridge ===
The Main South Road crossed the railway beside the station, and for decades the crossing had a poor safety record. In 1904 a local member of parliament, George Witty, sought a keeper for it because serious accidents had happened and traffic was heavy. By 1918 road users were ignoring the signal because it always showed red, and a signalman was stationed there only on race days.

Two serious collisions followed. In June 1930 the Islington workers' train, running in reverse, hit a car at the crossing, and the engine driver and the five people in the car were killed; the coroner found that running the engine in reverse had increased the danger. In 1934 a train from Little River ran into the back of the Invercargill express, which had stopped across the road with engine trouble, although nobody was badly hurt.

In November 1936 the Public Works Department decided to replace the crossing with an overbridge, despite opposition from shopkeepers who feared losing trade. In 1939 tenders were said to be about to be called, but the bridge was not built for another two decades, and in 1956 the crossing keeper was injured when a car failed to stop. The Ministry of Works planned the bridge with four traffic lanes and two footpaths, and it opened in May 1960, 56 years after the first request for a keeper at the crossing.

== Facilities ==
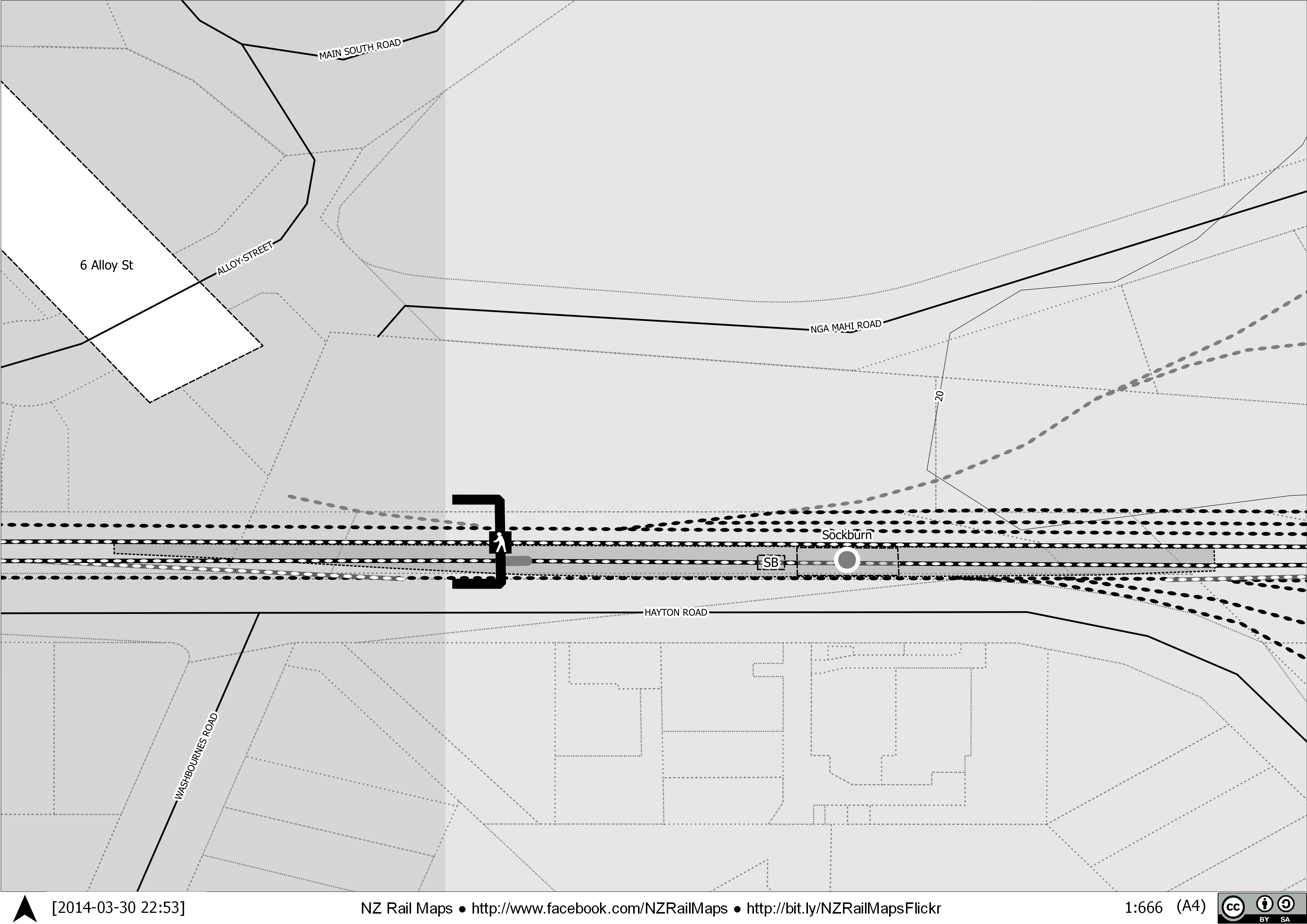
Map of Sockburn railway station

The station had a platform, a loading bank and, from 1903, a siding serving the abattoirs. A wooden pedestrian overbridge crossed the lines beside the station, with a ramp down to the platform.

== Services ==
Sockburn was a minor station on the South Line, used by local trains rather than long-distance services. The local passenger trains to Burnham and Ashburton stopped there if required, and from December 1949 until December 1967 the workers' train to Burnham carried workers from Sockburn, Hornby and Islington. The express trains did not stop: in 1904 the Minister of Railways said they could not, because Sockburn was too close to Hornby, where the express stopped when required.

== Later years and closure ==
In the mid-1970s the station building, signal box and platform were removed and replaced by a goods office and a staff amenity building, and the main lines were straightened. In 1979 the station's traffic was worked from Middleton yard. Goods traffic ended in October 1986, and the Rail Heritage Trust gives March 1987 as the closing date. The remaining office and amenity building was removed to Hornby in 1987. Nothing of the station remains apart from the pedestrian overbridge.

=== Styx–Sockburn deviation ===
For many years a railway deviation between Styx and Sockburn was planned to take the main lines round Christchurch, and in 1985 city councillors were told that it could remove a restriction on development at the airport. Some proposals would have closed and lifted the section of the Main North Line that the deviation bypassed, keeping a spur to serve Papanui station. The deviation was never built, the project was abandoned, and the land acquired for it is now used for a State Highway 1 deviation.
