= Hornby railway station, New Zealand =

Former railway station in Christchurch, New Zealand

Hornby
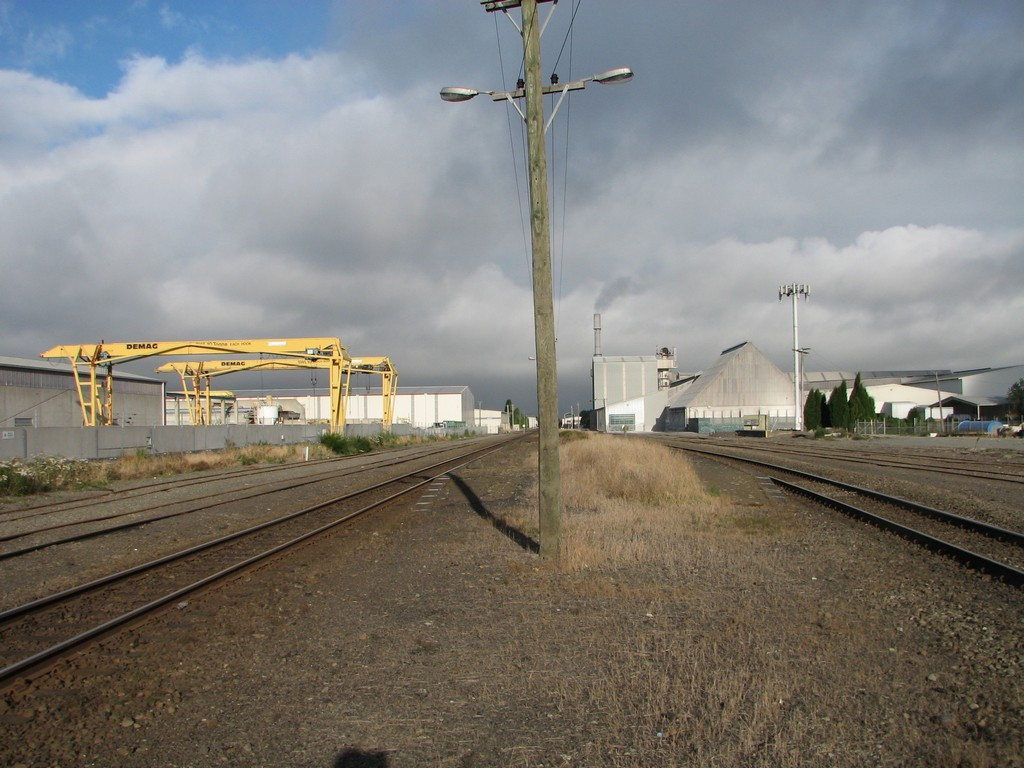
- The main platform

General information
- Location: 25 Canterbury Street, Hornby, Christchurch
- Coordinates: 43.54105°S 172.53152°E
- Line: Main South Line
- Platforms: 1 island platform
- Tracks: 4

History
- Opened: May 1875
- Former names: Racecourse Junction (1875); Southbridge Junction (1876); Hornby Junction (1878)

Services
Preceding station	Historical railways	Following station
Sockburn; Line open station closed	South Line; NZR	Islington; Line open station closed
Terminus	Southbridge Branch; NZR	Prebbleton; Line closed station closed
Location

Hornby railway station was a station on the Main South Line in Hornby, a suburb of Christchurch, New Zealand. It was the junction for the Southbridge Branch, and local passenger trains between Christchurch and Ashburton, Burnham and Springfield called there. The station opened in May 1875 as Racecourse Junction and was later known as Southbridge Junction, Hornby Junction and Hornby.

== History ==
=== Opening and names ===
The line from Christchurch to Rolleston opened in October 1866. In May 1875, trains stopped calling at the Racecourse station, now Sockburn, and a new station was built at Racecourse Junction, where the Southbridge Branch left the main line. Trains were calling at Sockburn again by 1878.

In 1876 Racecourse Junction was renamed Southbridge Junction, and in 1878 it became Hornby Junction. By August 1878 the railways had dropped Junction from the name, making it officially Hornby. The post office at the station became officially the Hornby Post Office in September 1878. Because of confusion with Hornby Junction, the railways renamed Horndon Junction on the Malvern Branch as Darfield Junction.

=== Southbridge Branch ===
The Southbridge Branch left the Main South Line at Hornby. It opened from Hornby to Springston in April 1875 and on to Southbridge in July 1875. Passenger services on the branch stopped in April 1951. The line closed from Lincoln to Southbridge in June 1962, and from Prebbleton to Lincoln in December 1967. Five kilometres of the line remains open as the Hornby Branch.

=== The 1908 move ===
In September 1908 the Hornby station yard was being remodelled and new station buildings were under construction as part of the duplication of the line between Addington and Rolleston.

In 1908 the station was moved about 300 metres towards Christchurch, away from the main shopping area at the corner of Main South Road and Shades Road. The new site was less convenient for the district, so the post office, which had operated at the station since 1878, moved to the general store.

== Industry ==
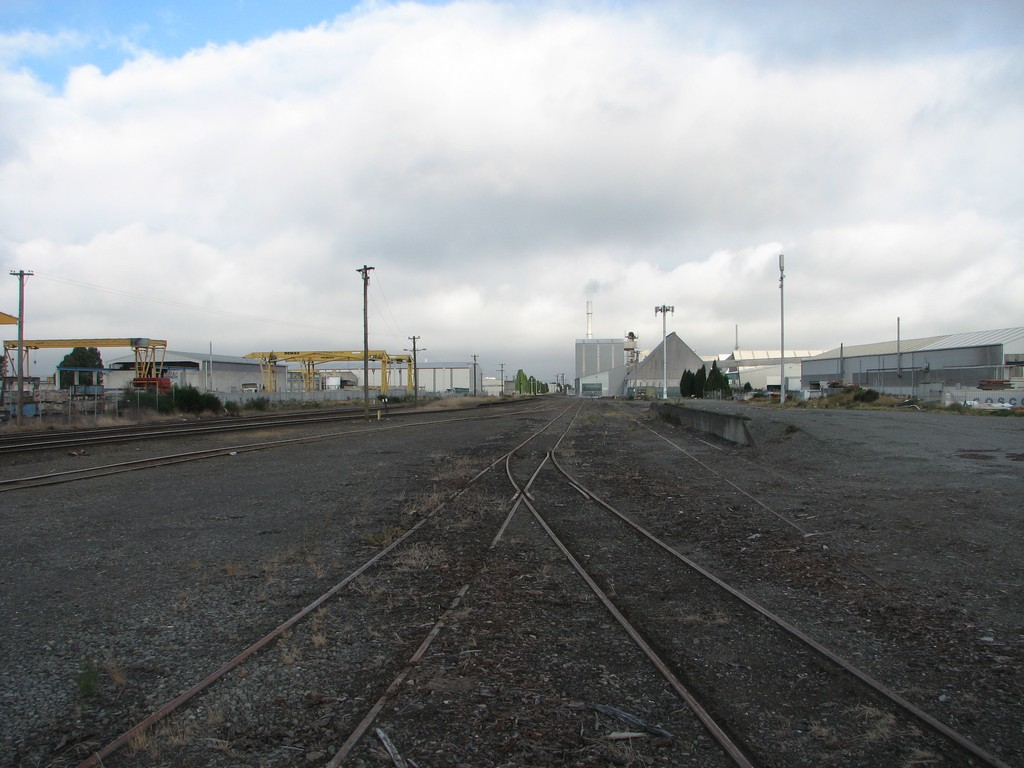
Platform and loading bank

Hornby grew around the meat industry and the railway. A works beside the station was built in 1896 by the British firm Nelson Bros, but it was never used to slaughter or freeze lamb and was used only occasionally to store frozen meat. The New Zealand Refrigerating Company bought it in 1920, and the buildings were sold for demolition in 1936. Hornby's industry also included a stonebreaking pit, run by Samuel Smart and Sons from 1884, and a fertiliser works that began as chemical works in 1917, later Kempthorne Prosser. In 1952 tenders were invited for unloading steel for the State Hydro-Electric Department at Hornby station and carting it to a depot in Roberts Road, Islington. In 1965 the Fletcher Trust and Investment Company planned an industrial estate of about 5 hectares near the station, with railway sidings available if needed. By 1921 the Kempthorne Prosser company had a private siding to its works and its own locomotive for shunting.

== Services ==
Trains on the Main South Line called at Hornby. In 1879, short daily trains ran from Christchurch to Hornby Junction, but a local resident complained that they were not advertised in the timetable or the newspapers. Ashburton trains stopped there from at least 1929, and in February 1940 special Sunday trains to Burnham Military Camp also called at Hornby. The later Ashburton, Burnham and Springfield services all stopped at Hornby.

== Facilities ==
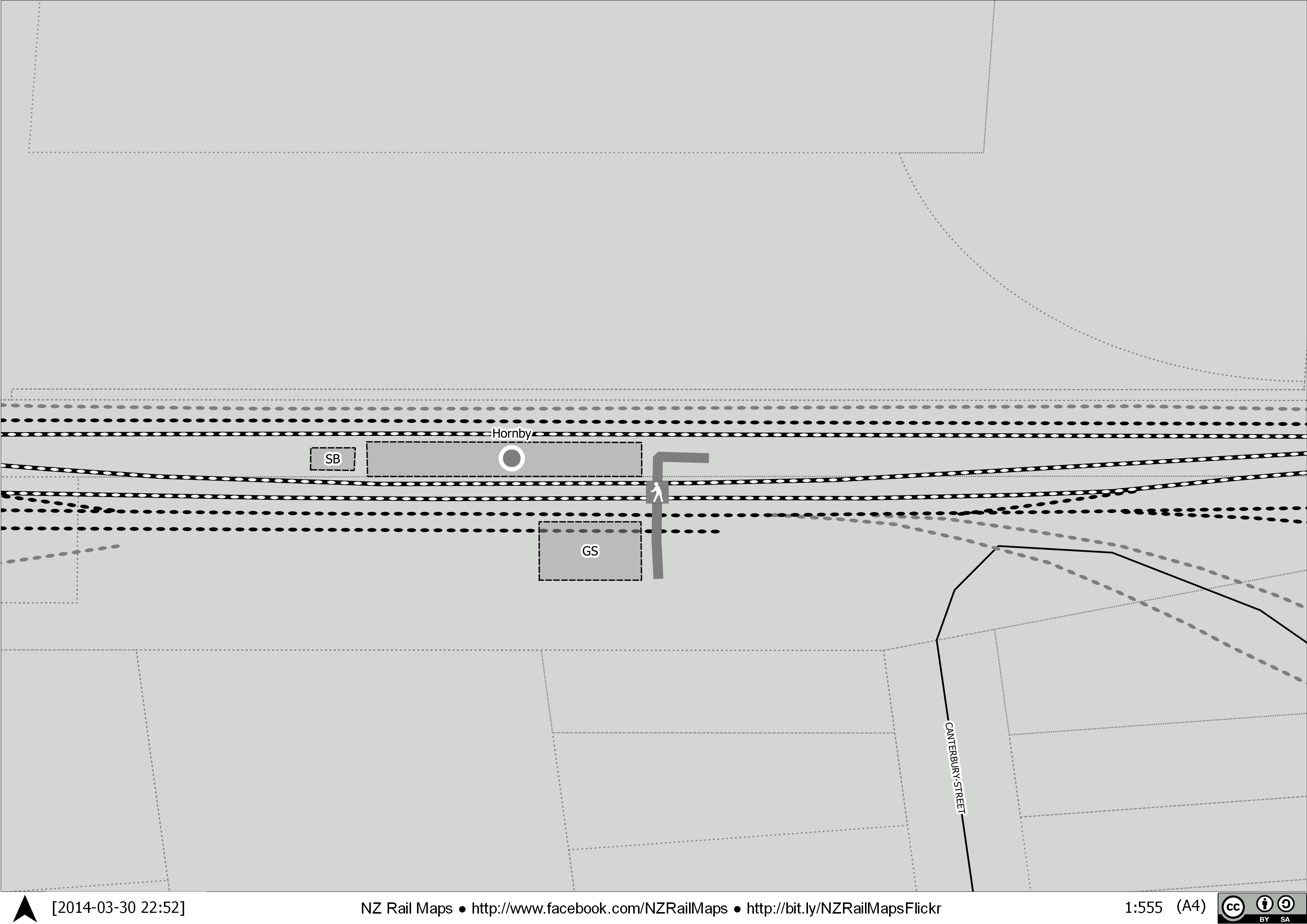
Map of Hornby

By 1935 the station had an island platform, a goods shed, a loading bank, stockyards and an overhead footbridge. In December 1985 an arson attack destroyed much of the station building, which was later demolished. A temporary building was brought to the site. In 1987 an amenity building was moved to Hornby from Sockburn. The signal cabin survived until at least 1989. The platform was later removed in the 2010s.

In 1953 the Paparua County Council heard complaints that the bells and lights at the Carmen Road crossing could operate continuously for up to two hours while trains stood at the station.

In 1964 the Paparua County Council agreed to install two lights in Canterbury Street for people walking to the station, but the Railways Department was not prepared to improve the lighting of the access way.

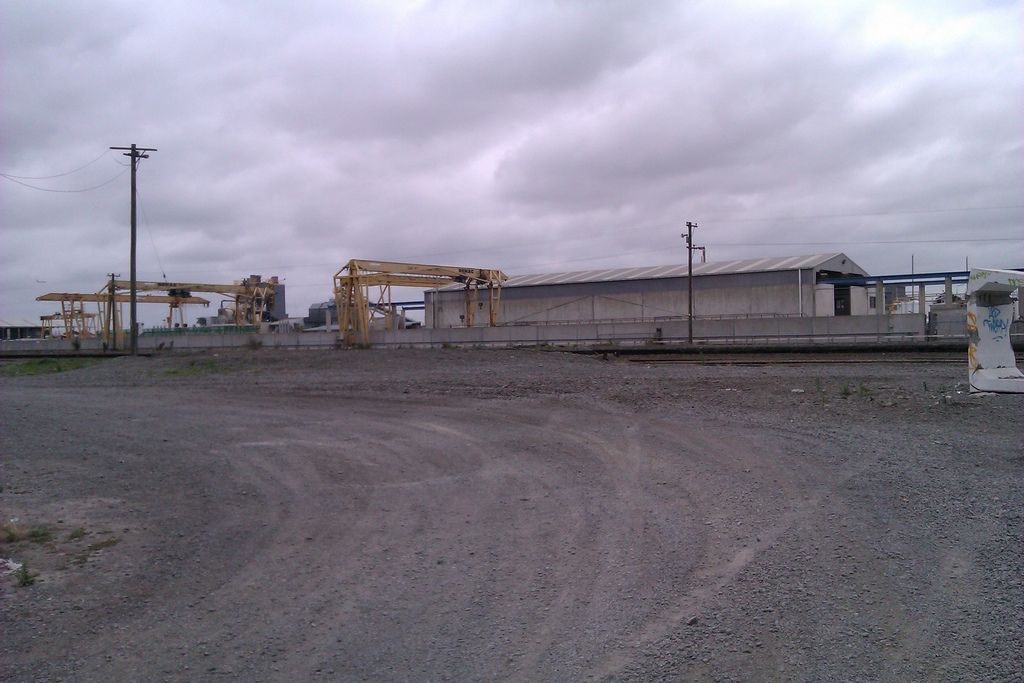
The back of loading bank can be seen in front of the station platform.

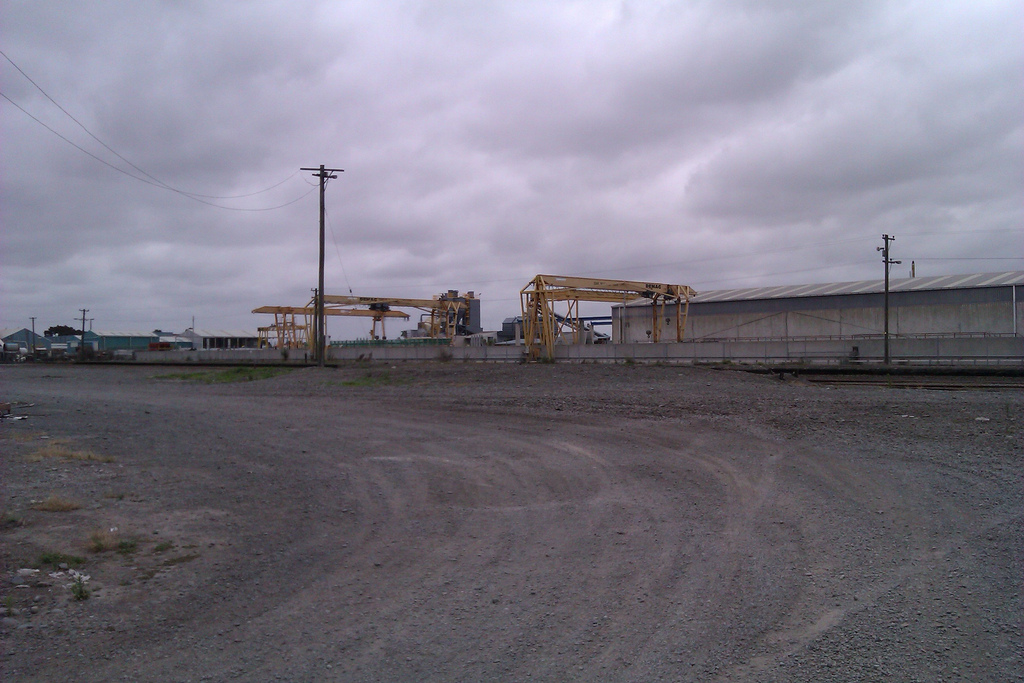
The back of loading bank can be seen in front of the station platform.

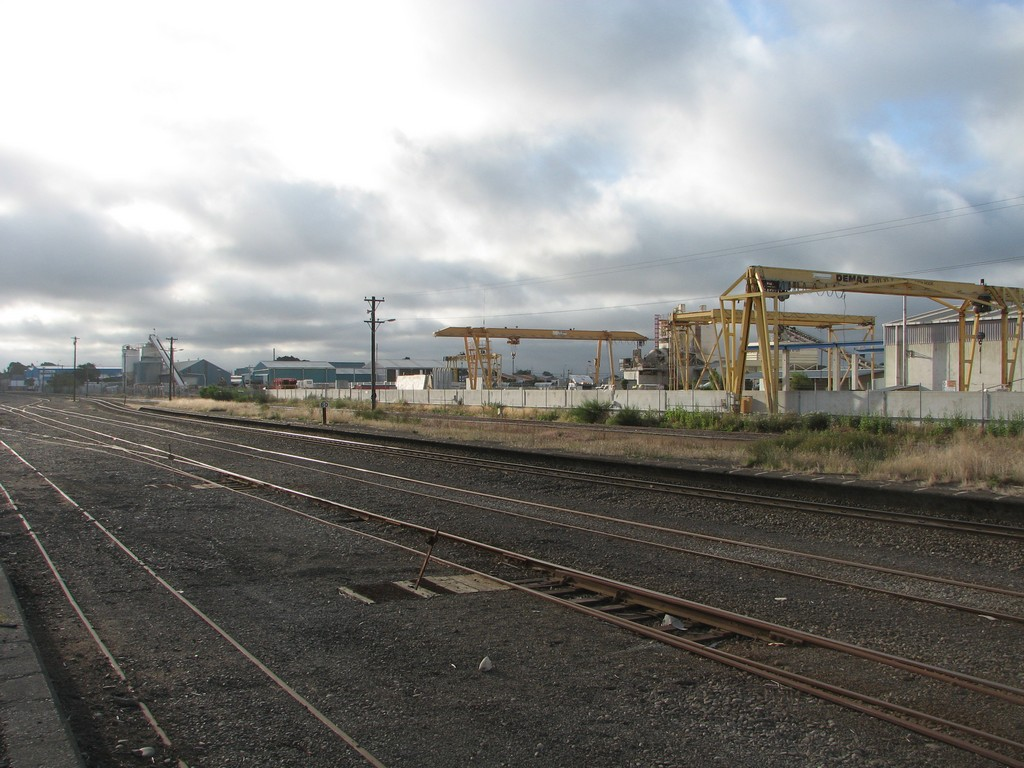
Main platform from the side.
