= Islington railway station, New Zealand =

Former railway station in Christchurch, New Zealand

Islington

General information
- Location: Islington, Christchurch
- Coordinates: 43°32′33.5″S 172°30′16.9″E
- Owner: New Zealand Railways Department
- Line: Main South Line
- Distance: 8.8 km from the Addington junction
- Platforms: 1 island platform

History
- Opened: 1870
- Closed: 18 June 1972
- Former names: Factory (until 1889)

Services
Preceding station	Historical railways	Following station
Hornby; Line open station closed	South Line; NZR	Templeton; Line open station closed
Location

Islington railway station was a station on the Main South Line in Islington, a suburb of Christchurch, New Zealand. It began as Factory station, beside a meat-preserving works, and took the name Islington in 1889. Its main traffic was the workers who travelled out from Christchurch to the freezing works and other factories nearby. The workers' train from Christchurch ran to Islington from 1896, and when it was extended to Burnham in 1949 it still stopped at Islington. The station closed in 1972 and its building was demolished the following year.

== History ==
=== Factory station ===
The Canterbury Meat-Preserving Company opened a canning factory beside the railway in 1870, about 11 kilometres from Christchurch, to turn surplus sheep into canned meat for export. A small station with a platform, called Factory Station, opened next to the factory. The factory employed 65 men and boys and could process 400 sheep a day. Canned meat and tallow were loaded straight onto railway wagons for Lyttelton.

The business soon ran into trouble. Faulty tins, too much supply and farmers' unwillingness to risk their sheep being canned led the company into liquidation in the mid-1870s, and the station closed in June 1875. The factory then stood unused for months. In October 1875 the Canterbury Meat Export Company was preparing to restart production there, but the station did not reopen until about April 1880, probably when the factory returned to use.

=== Islington and the freezing works ===
In 1889 the Christchurch Meat Company established a large freezing works on the same land as the former canning factory, initially named the Templeton Freezing Works. The company requested that the station be named Islington, and it was renamed in June. The works subsequently took the same name, becoming the Islington Freezing Works, which a newspaper considered appropriate because the Islington district of London was long associated with the meat trade. In December the company offered 40 sections for sale in a new village of Islington beside the works, intended in part for its employees. The works expanded rapidly and employed about 500 people by 1896, and the station's facilities were enlarged to serve them: the sidings beside the station were extended during the 1890s, and a passing loop had been built by 1898.

=== Facilities ===
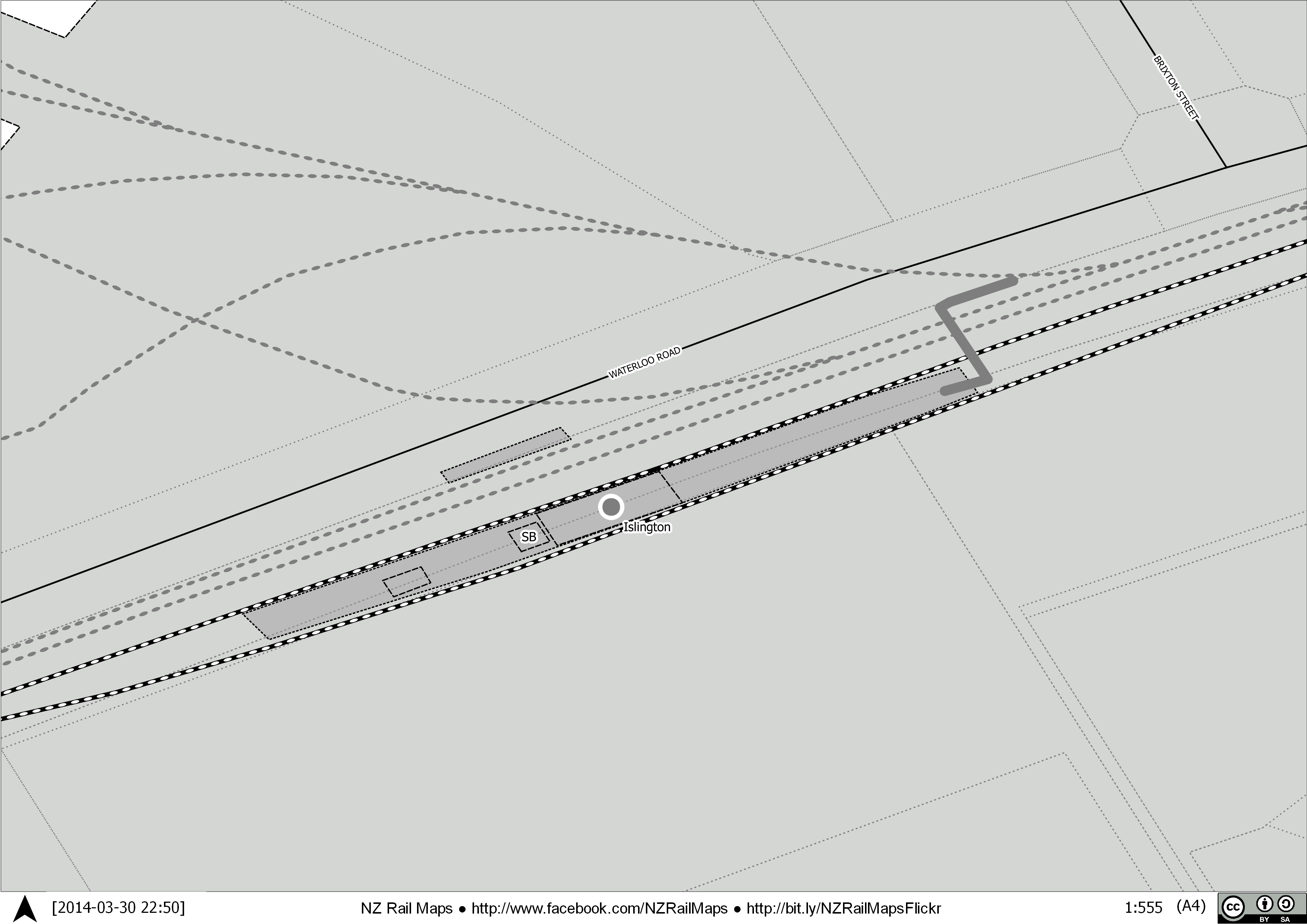
Map of Islington railway station and yard

The station had an island platform near Halswell Junction Road, with the up and down main lines on either side, and sidings serving the freezing works. By 1898 it had a shelter shed and toilets. Islington was treated as a flag station from the time the freezing works opened, and in 1908 residents petitioned the Minister of Railways for better facilities. The station and goods shed were improved that year, and a new station building followed in 1909, when double line working began between Addington and Rolleston. By 1909 Islington had grown important enough for a stationmaster to be placed there permanently. In 1922 the stationmaster had planted gardens along the platform.

== Services ==
In August 1896 the Hornby train was replaced by a workers' train that continued on to Islington, leaving Christchurch in the morning and returning in the afternoon. In December 1949 the train was extended to Burnham, but it still stopped at Islington until the Burnham service ended in December 1967.

In 1917 employees of the freezing works petitioned for the West Coast express to stop at Islington, and it did so only when passengers wanted to get off. The local services to Ashburton and Springfield also stopped there on request.

== Later years and closure ==
In February 1946 an express goods train ran into the back of a mixed train from the West Coast that was standing in the yard in thick fog. More than a dozen wagons were wrecked and morning services were delayed by over two hours, but no passengers or crew were involved.

After the workers' train ended in December 1967, the station was left with very little traffic. The stationmaster was withdrawn in 1968 and Islington became an unattended flag station, and in May 1972 the Minister of Railways told the council that the station would close, because it had almost no passengers and little freight. Wagon lots and trucks to private sidings would continue to be handled. The station closed in June 1972.

The building had been unused for ten years and the Railways Department had no further use for it. It was offered for sale for removal in June 1972 and demolished in early 1973. The wooden building was broken up for firewood, which was given away free. The yard beside it, used for shunting wagons to and from the freezing works, stayed in use, and it remains in use today at the end of the double-track section of the Main South Line from Christchurch.
