= Weedons railway station =

Former railway station in Selwyn District, New Zealand

Weedons

General information
- Location: Weedons, Selwyn District
- Coordinates: 43°34′48.7″S 172°24′21.5″E
- Owner: New Zealand Railways Department
- Line: Main South Line
- Platforms: 1 island platform (removed 1958)

History
- Opened: 13 October 1866
- Closed: 1 February 1964

Services
Preceding station	Historical railways	Following station
Templeton; Line open station closed	South Line; NZR	Rolleston; Line open station closed
Location

Weedons railway station was a railway station on the Main South Line south-west of Christchurch, New Zealand. It opened in 1866 and closed to all traffic in 1964, although its building and island platform had been removed in 1958. By 1955 a separate stopping place for passengers, the Air Department's Siding, served the nearby Royal New Zealand Air Force (RNZAF) station at Weedons. The air station site remains in Defence use as a depot and communications site.

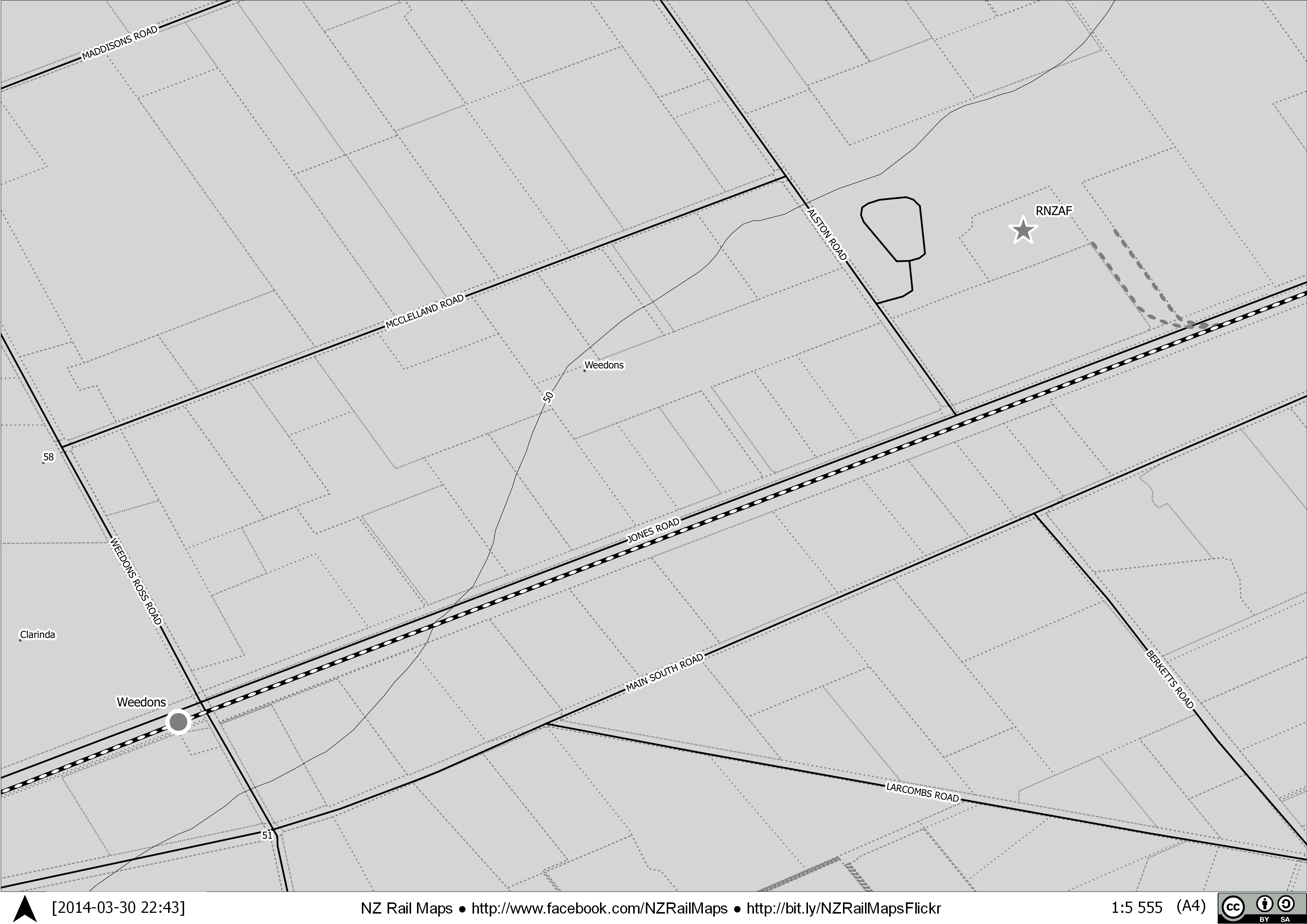
Map of Weedons railway station and the Air Department's Siding

== Railway station ==
=== Background ===
The locality was originally known as Weeden. In 1859 James Main opened the Half Way House accommodation house on the Great South Road, midway between Christchurch and the Selwyn Hotel, where coach horses were changed. William Weeden bought it in 1861 and planned a township beside it, but only four of about 300 sections were sold. When the railway opened in 1866 it passed on the opposite side of the main road from the inn, which lost most of its trade, and its licence lapsed in 1870. A misspelling on the station sign gave the locality the name Weedons, which became official in about 1880.

=== History ===
Weedons station opened on 13 October 1866 with the line from Christchurch. It served a farming district, with a post office from 1889, a goods shed from 1899 and sheep yards built after farmers asked for them in 1907. The station's future was occasionally uncertain. A rumour in 1922 that it would close led to a public meeting, and the Minister of Railways then said there was no intention of closing it. By 1925 it had become a flag station, and farmers successfully objected to the removal of its telephone, which they used to arrange trucks for produce and stock. By the late 1920s trains stopped only on request, and express trains ran through without stopping.

The level crossing beside the station, where the line was double track, was the site of two collisions, one in 1928 in which a girl died and another in 1933 involving a lorry and the West Coast express. In 1934 a rifle used in a shooting on a nearby road was found hidden in the chimney of the station's waiting room.

=== Facilities ===
The station had an island platform and a large building with a waiting room, a goods shed, sheep yards and a siding.

=== Decline and closure ===
By the late 1950s passenger traffic at Weedons was negligible. In 1958 the station building, which had been unused for some time and had been vandalised, was offered for sale for removal, and the island platform was to be removed so that the main line could be straightened when the track was relaid with welded rails. The siding was to remain. The station was recorded as closed to all traffic on 1 February 1964.

== Air Department's Siding and RNZAF Station Weedons ==
During the Second World War the RNZAF established an air station on Jones Road, a short distance from Weedons station. It was a stores and accommodation depot rather than an operational base. A siding off the Main South Line (43°34′15.7″S 172°25′48.1″E) connected it to the railway. Railway records list this as the Air Department's Siding, which by 1955 was also a stopping place for passengers, and it was listed as closed to passengers in 1967.

The station's early years included a fatal shooting of an airman in December 1949, which led to a commission of inquiry, and in the 1950s it housed American personnel for Antarctic flights. From 1960 it came under RNZAF Station Wigram and was used mainly as accommodation, and it also housed the transmitter site of a United States Navy communications unit supporting Antarctic operations, which was still operating in 1994.

By the 1980s most of the station had been disposed of, and the Air Force Museum of New Zealand used the remaining warehouses as stores until it moved out the last of its collection in 2017. The last stores building was demolished in 2019, leaving the radio masts of the transmitter site. The site remains in Defence use as a depot and communications site, and it is one of the force's high frequency radio sites, which were planned to be reduced from six to two, with Waiouru, under a project to replace the radio system.
