= Southbridge Branch, New Zealand =

Railway line

Southbridge Branch
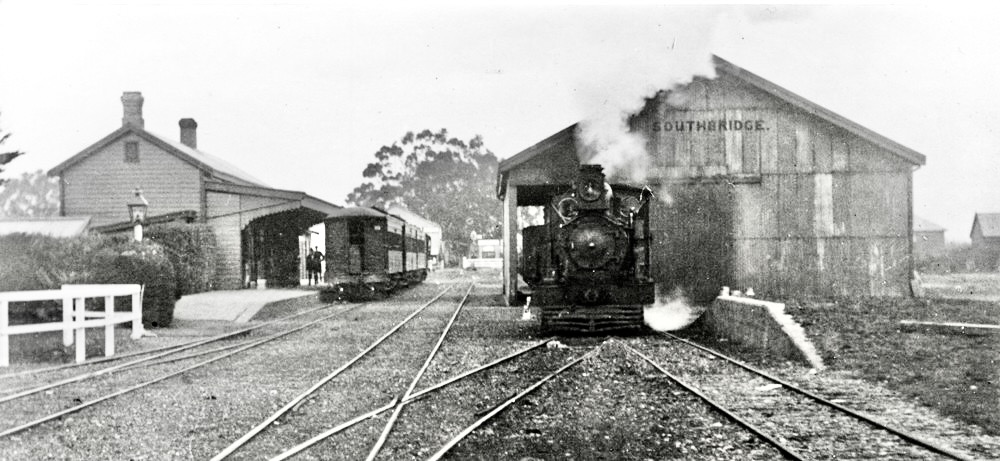
- Southbridge station

Overview
- Status: Closed (Excluding Hornby to north of Springs Road)
- Owner: Railways Department
- Locale: Canterbury, New Zealand
- Termini: Hornby; Southbridge
- Stations: 13

Service
- Type: Heavy Rail
- System: New Zealand Government Railways (NZGR)
- Operator: Railways Department

History
- Opened: 13 July 1875
- Closed: 30 June 1962 (Southbridge – Lincoln); 1 December 1967 (Lincoln – Prebbleton); 1986 (Prebbleton – north of Springs Road)

Technical
- Line length: 41 km
- Num of tracks: Single
- Character: Rural
- Track gauge: 3 ft 6 in (1,067 mm)

Map

The Southbridge Branch was a branch line railway that formed part of New Zealand's national rail network. It was located in the Canterbury region of the South Island and operated from 13 July 1875 until 1 December 1967. Five kilometres of the line remains open as the Hornby Branch, formerly the Hornby Industrial Line.

== Construction ==
On 2 November 1870, the Canterbury provincial government resolved to build a line from Rolleston to Southbridge, as the district around Lake Ellesmere / Te Waihora had become an economically significant grain-growing region that produced almost a quarter of all wheat in New Zealand in the late 1860s. However, by April 1872, the decision had been taken to establish the junction with the Main South Line in Hornby and work began on the line's formation.

Financial difficulties and delays in acquiring materials slowed construction initially, but on 26 April 1875, the line was opened to Springston. This gave the line a length of 17.74 kilometres (11.02 mi). On 13 July 1875, the rest of the line to Southbridge was opened, giving the branch a total length of 41.02 kilometres (25.49 mi) In 1880, construction of a sub-branch line off the Southbridge Branch to Little River from Lincoln began; this became the Little River Branch.

== Stations ==
The following stations were located on the Southbridge Branch (in brackets is the distance from the junction at Hornby):

- Prebbleton (5 km)
- Ladbrooks (9 km)
- Lincoln (13 km) – Little River Branch junction
- Springston (18 km)
- Goulds Road (20 km)
- Ellesmere (24 km)
- Lake Road (26 km)
- Irwell (29 km)
- Doyleston (32 km)
- Leeston (34 km)
- Hills Road (36 km)
- Southbridge (41 km)

== Operation ==
In the very early years of the line, a passenger train ran once each way daily between Christchurch and Lincoln, but this service ceased before 1880 and the line settled down to a pattern of "mixed" trains that carried both goods and passengers. These trains ran twice daily in 1914, along with a daily goods-only service, and a locomotive depot operated in Southbridge. Passenger numbers peaked in 1924, with approximately 34,000 carried, and picnic trains to Lake Ellesmere / Te Waihora were popular, but competition from road transport began to markedly increase, and the line was losing money in the late 1920s. In 1930, the decision was taken to close the Southbridge locomotive depot and operate all trains directly out of Christchurch, and this had a notable short-term impact, as the line made a profit in 1938.

However, in 1939, the Southbridge Branch again lost money and never returned to profitably. Post-World War II shortages and other economic factors led to the cancellation of passenger provisions on the line from 12 April 1951. After this stage, freight trains were only required to operate three or four times a week, and as traffic declined further, the decision was taken to abbreviate the line. On 30 June 1962, the 28 km section of line between Lincoln and Southbridge closed to all traffic. The Hornby-Lincoln section was then redesignated as the Hornby Industrial Line, which was cut back to Prebbleton station on 1 December 1967, and to the north side of the Springs Road crossing in 1986.

The line still exists as far as Springs Road at Prebbleton, the overbridge having been demolished in the late 1990s. The couple of kilometres still in use serves a number of industries and is shunted when required. Part of the formation near Prebbleton has been incorporated into the Little River Rail Trail, and a motorway being built just north of Prebbleton will see the line truncated just past the Watties siding, with incorporation of the disused track between the motorway and Marshs Road into the rail trail being proposed. Most of the land around the old Prebbleton yard has been developed for housing in the last five years, although some is in reserves and a pedestrian path runs along part of the formation south of Tosswill Road.

== Today ==
Remnants of closed railways often diminish and disappear with the passage of time, but some relics of the Southbridge Branch remain. Its formation can be traced for much of the line's length, though it does vanish at some points, at least in part because the flat terrain did not require substantial earthworks in the first place. There are also some bridge and culvert remains to be found along the line's former route, such as a footbridge near Lincoln utilising ex-railway abutments. Doyleston contains some of the most significant remnants, with the station site still in possession of its goods shed, loading bank, and passenger platform. Goods sheds can also be found in Leeston (demolished October 2020) and Springston, with the latter utilised as an engineer's workshop. Ellesmere retains concrete foundation remains, and in Irwell, rails can be found scattered at the station site and embedded in a road near an old factory. Some remnants of the line can be seen today in Southbridge, such as the rail and loading dock inside present-day Hamilton Seeds.

The Christchurch Little River Rail Trail Trust is developing a trail from Christchurch to Little River and opened the section from Prebbleton to Lincoln in November 2006, which runs alongside the rail corridor on Springs Road. In September 2009 the Trust opened the section from Hornby to Prebbleton, which utilises the abandoned formation between Marshs Road and Springs Road. As at November 2009 a housing development on the old railway yard at Prebbleton is well underway with railway-themed street names.
