= Riccarton Racecourse Siding =

Overview
- Locale: Canterbury, New Zealand

History
- Opened: 1877
- Closed: 1954

Technical
- Track gauge: 1,067 mm (3 ft 6 in)

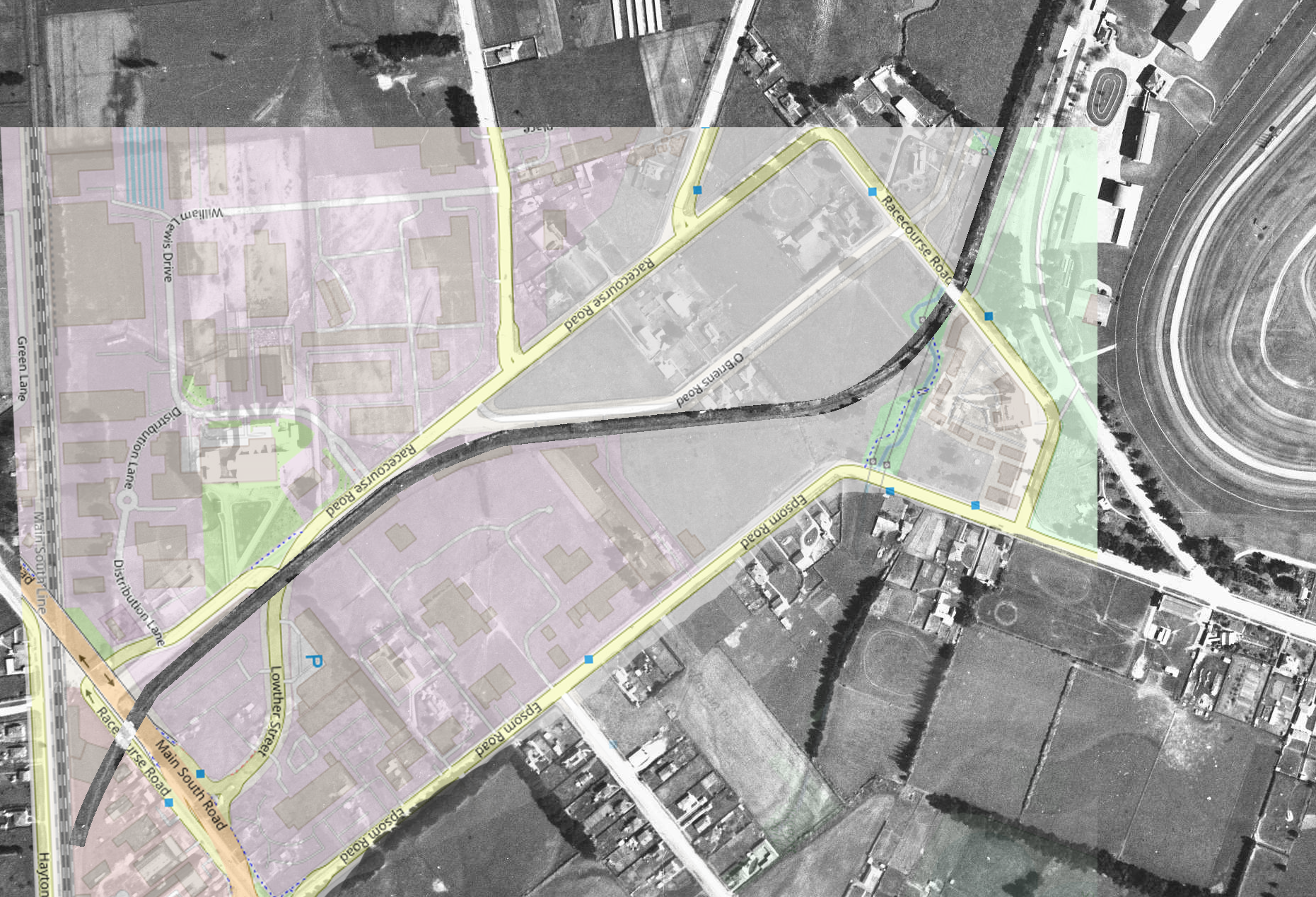
Riccarton Racecourse Siding – 1946 with overlay

The Riccarton Racecourse Siding or Line was a short (1.4 kilometres or 0.87 miles) siding or line on the Main South Line. It was built in 1877 to transport patrons from Christchurch to the Riccarton Racecourse in the suburb of Riccarton; this was (and remains) a place used for both racing and for outdoor events.

The line was promoted as a private enterprise by the Canterbury Jockey Club, and the assistance was sought by the government. Lancelot Walker, a former member of parliament, was sent to Wellington to negotiate the matter with John Davies Ormond, the Minister of Public Works. The businessman George Stead, as honorary secretary of the Canterbury Jockey Club from 1873 for over 30 years, was a promoter of the idea of making the horse racing ground more accessible, and to increase turnover. The line was surveyed in early October 1877 and opened four weeks later on 3 November 1877. The contractor who carried out the works was William Stokes, who had in the previous year built the bridge over the Waimakariri Gorge.

The line had competition from Christchurch trams in the 20th century; although slower the trams ran right into Cathedral Square in the centre of Christchurch. The last race train ran on 10 November 1954, and the line was lifted soon after. It remained private over the course of its existence and never belonged to the New Zealand Railways Department.

== Notes ==
=== Bibliography ===
- Churchman, Geoffrey B. (1991). On the Trans-Alpine Trail: A Travel Guide to State Highway 73 and the Midland Railway. Johnsonville, Wellington: IPL Books. ISBN 0-908876-73-4.
- Leitch, David Bruce; Scott, Brian (1998). Exploring New Zealand's Ghost Railways. New Zealand: Grantham House. ISBN 1869340485.
- Yonge, John (1993). New Zealand Railway and Tramway Atlas (4th ed.). Essex, England: Quail Map Company. ISBN 0-900609-92-3.
