= Mainland Rail =

Rail operator in New Zealand

Mainland Rail Limited
- Industry: Rail transport
- Founded: 2023
- Headquarters: Christchurch, New Zealand
- Area served: New Zealand
- Services: Passenger services
- Website: www.mainlandrail.com

Mainland Rail Limited is a New Zealand railway company that operates rail passenger services in the South Island of New Zealand.

== Background ==
The company was registered in 2023. The company is one-third owned by Pounamu Tourism Group.

== Services ==
=== The Mainlander ===
The company operates The Mainlander between Christchurch, Dunedin and Invercargill on weekends. On 1 November 2026, it was announced that The Mainlander would be funded to become a regular service for a 12-month trial period.

=== Crusaders Express ===
The company announced it intended to operate a "special events express" in Christchurch, transporting people to Te Kaha Stadium during concerts and sporting events. The first express service is expected to be for the April 2026 opening of the stadium, with the service carrying up to 5,700 passengers per event and travelling as far as Ashburton and Rangiora.

In March 2026, Mainland Rail, telecommunications company 2 Degrees, and the Crusaders rugby union franchise announced the "Crusaders Express" service. This service commenced on 24 April 2026, leaving from Rolleston Station to a temporary platform at Pilgrim Place. Future services are planned for Crusaders games at the new Te Kaha stadium.

==== Central Christchurch platform ====
In November 2025, The Press newspaper reported that Mainland Rail was working alongside "private partners" and Christchurch City Council to construct a central city platform, by the Moorhouse Avenue and Colombo Street overbridge. KiwiRail also said it was engaged in technical discussions for a new station, and for monthly slots in the track timetable for an event service.

=== Commuter train trial ===
On 1 November 2026, the Government announced a 12-month trial of commuter rail services in Christchurch, with Mainland Rail to provide morning and evening services between Rangiora, Rolleston and central Christchurch; at the same time The Mainlander would become a regular service.

Funding would come from $3.4m from the Regional Development Fund, with $1.7m from local authorities.

The putative start date is mid-2027 for this service.

== Rolling stock ==
The company has purchased the 10 sets of the former Auckland Transport ADL/ADC class diesel multiple units, and the former KiwiRail-owned Capital Connection S class carriages.
