= Burnham Military Camp =

Largest army base in New Zealand's South Island

Burnham Camp
- Burnham, New Zealand
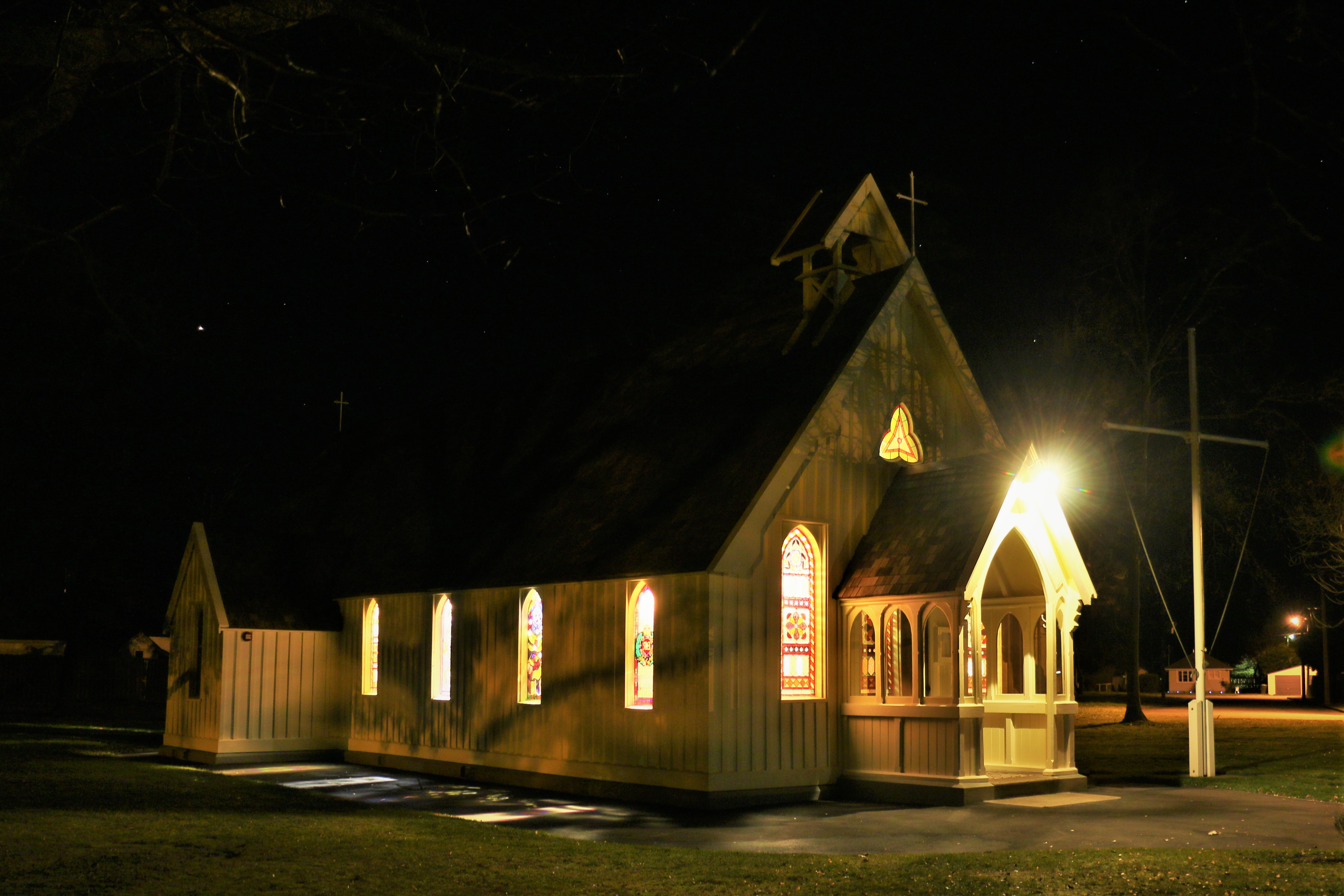
- All Saints' Garrison Church

Site information
- Type: Army Camp
- Owner: New Zealand Defence Force
- Controlled by: New Zealand Army

Location
- Coordinates: 43°36′52″S 172°18′12″E
- Area: 1.49 km^{2} (0.58 sq mi)

Site history
- In use: 1921–present

Garrison information
- Garrison: New Zealand Army

Burnham, also known as Burnham Camp, is the largest army base in New Zealand's South Island. It is located 28 kilometres south of Christchurch on the Canterbury Plains in the Selwyn District, close to the town of Dunsandel. Burnham was named after Burnham Beeches, Buckinghamshire.

The senior headquarters at the camp has seen many changes. Previously Headquarters 3 Task Force, 3 Task Force Region, HQ Ready Reaction Force, and 3 Land Force Group have been based here. Most recently 3 Land Force Group was disbanded in 2011, and Headquarters Deployable Joint Task Force Headquarters - Land (DJTFHQ-L) was formed.

== Demographics ==
Burnham Camp is described by Statistics New Zealand as a small urban area, and covers 1.49 km^{2} (0.58 sq mi). It had an estimated population of 900 as of June 2025, with a population density of 604 people per km^{2}.

Historical population
Year	Pop.	±% p.a.
2006	1,206	—
2013	1,089	−1.45%
2018	1,146	+1.03%
2023	798	−6.98%

Burnham Camp had a population of 798 in the 2023 New Zealand census, a decrease of 348 people (−30.4%) since the 2018 census, and a decrease of 291 people (−26.7%) since the 2013 census. There were 474 males, 318 females, and 6 people of other genders in 186 dwellings. 6.0% of people identified as LGBTIQ+. The median age was 24.9 years (compared with 38.1 years nationally). There were 117 people (14.7%) aged under 15 years, 456 (57.1%) aged 15 to 29, 216 (27.1%) aged 30 to 64, and 12 (1.5%) aged 65 or older.

People could identify as more than one ethnicity. The results were 80.8% European (Pākehā); 23.7% Māori; 10.2% Pasifika; 6.4% Asian; 0.8% Middle Eastern, Latin American and African New Zealanders (MELAA); and 1.9% other, which includes people giving their ethnicity as "New Zealander". English was spoken by 95.9%, Māori by 4.9%, Samoan by 1.1%, and other languages by 7.5%. No language could be spoken by 3.0% (e.g. too young to talk). New Zealand Sign Language was known by 1.5%. The percentage of people born overseas was 17.3, compared with 28.8% nationally.

Religious affiliations were 23.3% Christian, 0.8% Hindu, 0.8% Islam, 0.8% Māori religious beliefs, 0.8% New Age, and 3.0% other religions. People who answered that they had no religion were 66.9%, and 4.5% of people did not answer the census question.

Of those at least 15 years old, 96 (14.1%) people had a bachelor's or higher degree, 516 (75.8%) had a post-high school certificate or diploma, and 72 (10.6%) people exclusively held high school qualifications. The median income was $53,900, compared with $41,500 nationally. 21 people (3.1%) earned over $100,000 compared to 12.1% nationally. The employment status of those at least 15 was 528 (77.5%) full-time, 51 (7.5%) part-time, and 18 (2.6%) unemployed.

== Current Units at the camp ==
=== 1st (New Zealand) Brigade ===
==== Combat Units ====
- 2/1st Battalion, Royal New Zealand Infantry Regiment
  - Alpha Company
  - Bravo Company
  - Charlie Company
  - Delta Company
  - Support Company
  - Depot Company
  - Combat Service Support Company

==== Combat Support Units ====
- 2nd Engineer Regiment,
  - 3rd Field Squadron
  - 3 Emergency Response Troop
- 1st New Zealand Signal Regiment,
  - 3rd Signal Squadron (Electronic Warfare)
  - 4th Signal Squadron
  - 25 Cypher Section

==== Combat Service Support Units ====
- 3rd Combat Service Support Battalion (Burnham Military Camp)
  - 3rd Transport Company
  - 3rd Catering & Supply Company
  - 3rd Workshop Company

=== Joint Support Group ===
==== Deployable Health Organisation ====
- Southern Health Support Squadron
- Logistics Support Squadron

==== Force Health Organisation ====
- Defence Health Centre
- Burnham Gymnasium

=== New Zealand Defence College ===
- Defence Health School (NZ)
- Defence Learning Centre

=== Headquarters Training and Doctrine Command ===
- Army Adventure Training Centre
- 3 Regional Training wing

=== Lockheed Martin New Zealand ===
Lockheed Martin New Zealand provides logistics services for the NZDF including Maintenance, Repair, and Overhaul, Managed Fleet Utilisation and warehousing.

- Maintenance, Repair and Overhaul team
- Managed Fleet Utilisation team

=== Other Units ===
- New Zealand Army Band
- Youth Development Unit (YDU)
- Services Corrective Establishment (SCE)
- Joint Military Police Unit
- Joint Logistic Support Agency service centre
- Human Resources service centre

=== Medical training ===
Medical training for the entire NZDF is conducted in Burnham at the New Zealand Defence Force Health School and all medics enlisted in the Army, Navy or Air Force are sent here for training. Practical training and clinical placements are completed throughout the two and a half year program. Medics are then posted to their respective camps or bases.

=== Cadet force ===
Burnham is also home to the Southern HQ of the New Zealand Cadet Forces (NZCF). They are the Air Training Corps (Air Force), Cadet Corps (Army), and Sea Cadet Corps (Navy).

=== Services Corrective Establishment ===
The Services Corrective Establishment (SCE) is the NZDF's sole military prison. Previously based at Ardmore in Auckland, the SCE was relocated to Burnham Military Camp in 1995. The prison hosts enlisted personnel who are serving sentences with a maximum of two years. Commissioned officers and enlisted personnel sentenced to a prison term exceeding two years are sent to civilian prisons. The prison's regime consist of a mixture of corrective training and rehabilitation, with the goal of returning inmates to service in the Defence Force.

Between 2013 and 2018, nearly 140 personnel were detained at SCE, with an average stay of 14 days. Half of inmates were sent there for drug and alcohol offences, while 20 were sent there for assault-related offences. In August 2025, a Defence Force soldier, who became the first New Zealander convicted of attempted espionage, was sentenced to a prison term of two years at the facility.

== Barracks ==
The barracks in Burnham Camp are named after a miscellany of battles, campaigns, locations and overseas barracks in which New Zealand troops have been stationed.

=== Borneo Barracks ===
Borneo Barracks Commemorates what is now known as the Indonesia–Malaysia confrontation of 1963–1966), the 1st Battalion, Royal New Zealand Infantry Regiment and the New Zealand Special Air Service both saw service in this conflict.

=== Cambrai Barracks ===
Named after the Battle of Cambrai of Nov -Dec 1917 which saw the first mass use of tanks in battle.

=== Chunuk Bair Barracks ===
Chunuk Bair Barracks are named after the August 1915 battle in which the Wellington Infantry Regiment (NZEF) occupied one of the highest points on the Gallipoli Peninsula.

=== Dieppe Barracks ===
Dieppe Barracks are named after the Singapore garrison of the 1st Battalion, Royal New Zealand Infantry Regiment from 1971 to 1980.

=== Faenza Barracks ===
Faenza Barracks are named after the Italian city of Faenza which New Zealand Division liberated over the period of 14–20 December 1944, during operations to break the German Gothic Line.

=== Gallipoli Barracks ===
Gallipoli Barracks are named after the New Zealand's Army's first major campaign of the First World War.

=== Ipoh Barracks ===
Ipoh Barracks are named after the town in Malaysia that the 1st Battalion of the New Zealand Regiment were garrisoned in from March 1958 to early 1959 during the Malayan Emergency.

=== Nee Soon Barracks ===
Nee Soon Barracks are named after the Singapore garrison of the 1st Battalion, Royal New Zealand Infantry Regiment from 1969 to 1971.

=== Nui Dat Barracks ===
Nui Dat Barracks are named after the operational base of the 1st Australian Task Force from 1965 to 1971, to which New Zealand contributed;

- One to two rifle companies (W and V Company, Royal New Zealand Infantry Regiment);
- One artillery battery (161st Battery, Royal New Zealand Artillery); and
- One New Zealand SAS troop.

=== Quinns Post Barracks ===
Quinn's Post Barracks are named after one of the strongholds on the ANZAC line during the Gallipoli campaign.

=== Sangro Barracks ===
Sangro Barracks are named after the 27/28 November 1943 crossing of the Sangro River which was a harsh introduction to the Italian Campaign for the 2nd New Zealand Division.

=== Sari Bair Barracks ===
Sari Bair Barracks are named after a tangled mass of hills and watercourses inland from ANZAC Cove and Suvla Bay.

=== Suvla Barracks ===
Suvla Barracks are named after the bay which lies at the north-western end of ANZAC Cove on the Gallipoli peninsula and was essentially the left flank of the Australian and New Zealand Army Corps.

=== Taiping Barracks ===
Taiping Barracks are named after the town in Malaysia that in the late 1950s two New Zealand Battalions were garrisoned in during the Malayan emergency.

=== Terendak Barracks ===
Terendak Barracks are named after the purpose built brigade camp in Malaysia that was occupied by the New Zealand Army from 1960 to 1969

=== Tobruk Barracks ===
Tobruk Barracks are named after besieged Garrison of Tobruk in Libya which the 2nd New Zealand Division and 7th Armored Division helped relieve on 27 November 1941 during Operation Crusader.

=== Tui Barracks ===
Tui Barracks were named after the New Zealand Women's War Service Auxiliary. Raised by Lady Freyberg to support New Zealand troops in Egypt, the ladies of the Women's War Service Auxiliary were unofficially called the Tuis.

== Education ==
Burnham School - Te Kura o Tiori is a full primary school catering for years 1 to 8. It had a roll of 184 as of July 2026. It opened in 1884.

Burnham Industrial School was a reform school set up in the mid 19th century. The school was still operating in 1909.

== See also ==
- Linton Military Camp
- Hopuhopu Camp
- Papakura Military Camp
- Trentham Military Camp
- Waiouru Military Camp
