= Ferrymead 125 =

One-time celebration event in New Zealand

The Ferrymead 125 celebration was an event to celebrate 125 years of rail transport in New Zealand. The event was held over a whole week from 17 to 24 October 1988, with trains running in, and to and from Christchurch.

== Excursions ==
The first excursion during the event was on 22 October 1988, with a return excursion bound for Timaru with a 20 total train, which was hauled by the Glenbrook Vintage Railway's J^{A} 1250 and Mainline Steam's J 1211. This excursion was the first steam-hauled train on the Main South Line since 1971, and also J 1211's first train since being restored. The second excursion for the event was a four-car total train to Springfield, and hauled by the Diesel Traction Groups D^{G} 772 and D^{E} 511. This ran on the morning of 23 October 1988, the same day as the railway cavalcade. The third and last excursion was another double-headed steam excursion to Arthur's Pass, and again hauled by J^{A} 1250 "Diana" and J 1211 "Gloria", with another 20 total train on 24 October 1988.

== Shuttle trains ==
Shuttle trains to Lyttelton and Rangiora ran over a week and were both steam hauled. The Lyttelton shuttle trains ran from the former Christchurch Railway Station, to the Ferrymead Railway where the train travelled to the Ferrymead station, and then on to Lyttelton, and then returned to Christchurch. The shuttles were hauled by the Canterbury Railway Society's C 864, and with an eight-total train in tow.

The Rangiora shuttles were held in the evenings and were hauled by the Railway Heritage Trusts W 192, with a five-total train in tow. On the second evening, W 192 suffered steaming issues and was replaced by C 864. But the 'W' later returned for the remaining shuttles. The Rangiora shuttle trains ran from the former Christchurch Railway Station to Rangiora and Return

== Steam Trek '88 ==
Steam Trek '88 was an operation to move preserved equipment down for the Ferrymead 125 celebrations. The Steam Trek involved a round trip of 18 days from Auckland to Christchurch, and covered over 1,000 kms each way. It was organised by the Railway Enthusiasts Society and the Glenbrook Vintage Railway.

The train left Auckland on 14 October 1988 with J^{A} 1250 and GVR No.1 (W^{W} 480) at the head, and a UC tank wagon, two high-side LC wagons, two ZAT wagons, four yellow A^{A} carriages, and an FM van. At Pukekohe junction, W^{W} 480 was uncoupled from the train due to a mechanical issue developing. The steam trek reached the South Island on 17 October 1988, and arrived in Christchurch on 19 October 1988.

The return journey began on 25 October 1988, when J^{A} 1250 travelled from Christchurch to Waipara, where the 'J^{A}' was used on the Weka Pass Railway. The train left Waipara the very next day after that, and soon arrived in Wellington on 28 October 1988. The "Steam Trek" train finally arrived back in Auckland station on 31 October 1988.

== The Cavalcade ==
On 23 October 1988, a cavalcade was held at the Christchurch Railway Station. Locomotives and rolling stock moved slowly along the third road as a large crowd watched.

The list of locomotives and rolling stock involved in the cavalcade:

- A 64 from The Plains Railway, L 1939 high-side wagon, and F 78 guards van, both from the Canterbury Railway Society
- C 132 from the Silver Stream Railway, and an LA class high-side wagon
- D 16 and A 421 Half-Birdcage carriage from the Pleasant Point Museum and Railway
- F 13, F 372 guards van and A 516 "Elevated roof" carriage from the Canterbury Railway Society
- W 192 from the Rail Heritage Trust of New Zealand, and A 222 "low roof" carriage and F 624 "Fell brake" van
- DC4922 and a CB class coal hopper wagon from the New Zealand Railways Corporation
- DJ3643 from the New Zealand Railways Corporation and A 1320 Northerner Sleeping carriage from Western Springs Railway
- DX5402, EO68 from the New Zealand Railways Corporation, a J 3525 class sheep wagon from the Canterbury Railway Society, E 7200 four-wheel wagon, and JX 14 covered bogie wagon also from the New Zealand Railways Corporation
- DF6104 from the New Zealand Railways Corporation
- A^{B} 699 from the Pleasant Point Railway, W^{D} 357 and Y^{B} 291 ballast hopper wagon both from the Canterbury Railway Society, and A^{B} 608 and X 442 from the New Zealand Railway and Locomotive Society
- CB 113 from the Canterbury Railway Society, NA 3591 flat-deck wagon from the New Zealand Railways Corporation, W^{AB} 794 from the New Zealand Railway and Locomotive Society, NA 4411, also from the New Zealand Railways Corporation, and Fowler No. 548 from Steam Scene
- C 864 from the Canterbury Railway Society, Craven Crane N^{O}. 200 from the Craven Crane Group (now owned by Steam Incorporated), and LC high-side wagon, and K^{B} 968 from the Ferrymead Trust
- DSC2746 and FM 883 guards van from the New Zealand Railways Corporation
- RM 56 - from the Federation of Rail Organisations of New Zealand
- DSG 3114 - from the New Zealand Railways Corporation
- J 1211 from the Mainline Steam Heritage Trust, with two M class low-side wagons, one K class and W 400 ventilated box wagons from the Canterbury Railway Society (the 'W' only)
- J^{A} 1250 and two A^{A} wide-body carriages from the Glenbrook Vintage Railway
- D^{E} 511 from the Diesel Traction Group, with E^{O} 3, E^{C} 7, E^{W} 1806 and E^{D} 103 from the Canterbury Railway Society
- DS 140 from Waitaki NZ, Lorneville (now on display at Oamaru), and a V class ventilated box wagon
- D^{G} 772 from the Diesel Traction Group
- D^{G}s 791 and 770, along with F 699 brake van and three A 50-foot carriage from the Weka Pass Railway
- V 148 from Steam Scene and an LC class high-side wagon
- DSA658 - from Ravensdown Fertiliser, Hornby
- T^{R} 22 - from the Canterbury Railway Society

== See also ==
- NZ Rail 150 in 2013
