= DF class =

DF class may refer to:

- NZR DF class English Electric locomotive
- New Zealand DF class locomotive (1979) General Motors Electro-Motive Division locomotive
