= Railway preservation in New Zealand =

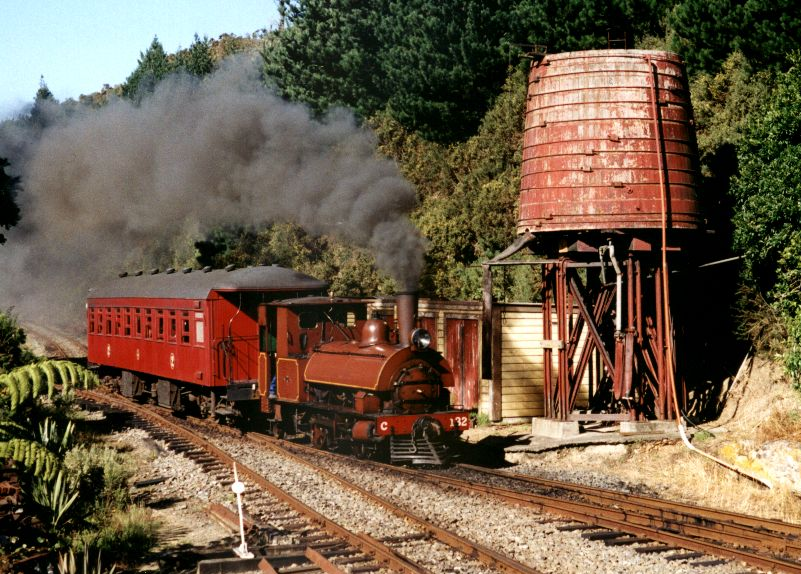
Preserved C class steam locomotive #132 on the heritage Silver Stream Railway, 6 March 2002.

Railway preservation in New Zealand is the preservation of historically significant facets of New Zealand's rail transport history. The earliest recorded preservation attempt took place in 1925, although the movement itself did not start properly until 1960.

== History ==
=== Early initiatives ===
Early preservation efforts in New Zealand were restricted to static public display of locomotives, and it is believed the first was Double Fairlie E class locomotive E 175 Josephine outside the Dunedin Railway Station in 1925. After this, the preservation movement entered a hiatus until the founding of the New Zealand Railway and Locomotive Society in 1944, which established branches throughout the country. The first act of active railway preservation was started by the NZR&LS Otago Branch when they purchased a small 9-tonne Fowler 0-4-0T tank locomotive built in 1921 and formerly used by the Public Works Department as their N^{O} 540, from the Otago Harbour Board for use on the fledgeling Ocean Beach Railway, established in 1963.

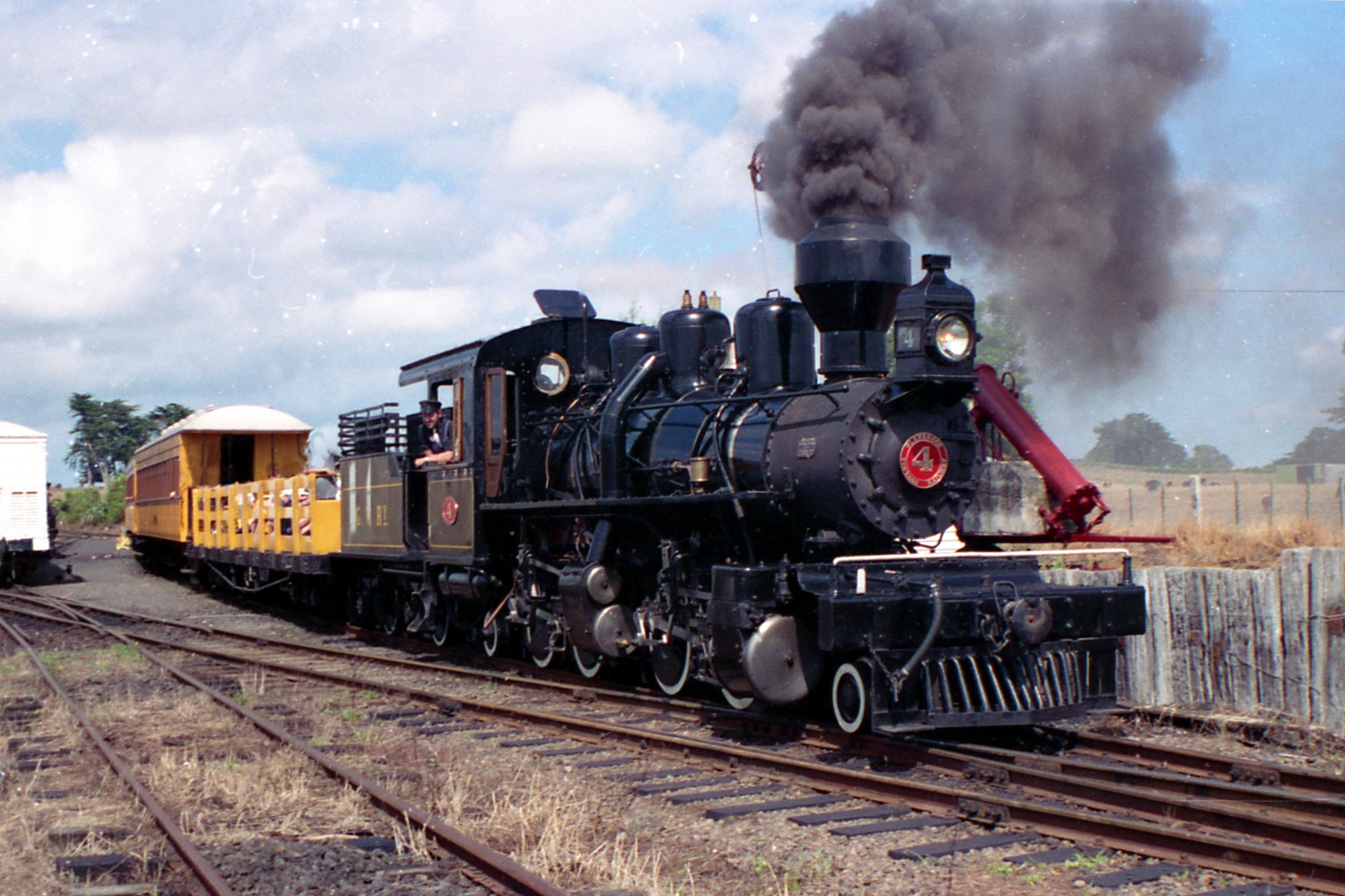
1912 Alco Mallet No. 4 of the Glenbrook Vintage Railway

Similar works were soon started in Christchurch by the NZR&LS Canterbury Branch at their new Ferrymead Railway in Christchurch, the NZR&LS Auckland Branch at their Glenbrook Vintage Railway and the NZR&LS Wellington Branch at their Silver Stream Railway. A railway museum was established at Te Awamutu by the NZR&LS Waikato Branch. However, this period also saw the breakaway of the NZR&LS Auckland and Canterbury Branches to become the Railway Enthusiasts Society and the Canterbury Railway Society respectively, although they retained an affiliation with the NZR&LS. (Note: The NZR&LS Auckland Branch was later re-established by Alistair Tewsley in the early 1970s.)

=== 1960 to 1985 ===
During the period from 1960 to 1979, the rail preservation scene began to increase as more railway museums and groups were established, helped in part by the closure of rural branch lines by New Zealand Railways. In this category, railway museum groups were set up by the Pleasant Point Museum and Railway at Pleasant Point and the Ashburton Railway and Preservation Society at Tinwald Domain near Ashburton in Canterbury. These groups at the time were attempting to save part of the fabric of rural branch lines that had been operated by New Zealand Railways but were being closed down.

As the replacement of steam was accelerated during this period and was completed in 1971, other groups were initiated to preserve the mainline locomotives and rolling stock of NZR. The first group to do so was Steam Incorporated, based out of the former Paekakariki locomotive depot site just north of Wellington. The Museum of Transport and Technology in Auckland also began to accept railway vehicles for preservation, in conjunction with the Bush Tramway Club which was preserving former industrial locomotives used on the bush tramways of New Zealand.

Following the end of steam in 1971, NZR placed a total steam ban on the national network, with the exception of its own heritage operation, the famous Kingston Flyer which began operation between Lumsden and Kingston on the Kingston Branch in that year. This ban required that if steam locomotives were to operate in New Zealand, they would be confined to either heritage railways, museums, or private sites. During this time, the majority of groups established began to expand their operations as NZR progressively modernised, and in some cases were able to extend their running lines or establish museum-type displays to showcase their rolling stock.

In 1977 the National Federation of Railway Societies was formed to provide a cohesive network between the different groups. This group would work as a coordinator and organiser in later years between different groups.

This period also saw the birth of the Otago Excursion Train Trust, founded in 1978 to run excursion trains over the scenic Otago Central Railway. Initially, these trains were run with NZR carriages and locomotives but later the OETT purchased its own fleet of carriages from NZR which were refurbished by Government apprentices and volunteers, first at Burnside railway station and later in the north yard at Dunedin railway station. This group was joined by Steam Incorporated and the Railway Enthusiasts Society in running similar excursions using NZR diesel locomotives but the organising group's own carriages.

In 1985, NZR agreed to remove the steam ban in conjunction with the centenary of the start of construction of the North Island Main Trunk. A steam excursion was run from Wellington to Auckland, using Steam Incorporated's K^{A} 945 and the RES' J^{A} 1250 to haul the train of mixed Steam Inc and RES stock. As NZR still used red as the colour for its coaching stock, these groups used their own liveries, predominantly brown or yellow.

=== 1985 to 2000 ===
Although the pace of preservation slowed into the early 1980s and beyond, several more groups were established to preserve longer branch lines as well as the more traditional museum-focused operation. The Weka Pass Railway in North Canterbury, the Bay of Islands Vintage Railway in Northland, the Otago-based Dunedin Railways, and the Goldfields Steam Train Society in the Bay of Plenty were all founded during the early 1980s using stock retired by NZR. In the case of Dunedin Railways (formerly known as Taieri Gorge Railway Limited), it was created by the OETT and the Dunedin City Council to preserve the 64-kilometre section of the Otago Central railway between Middlemarch and Wingatui through the Taieri Gorge for passenger operations after the New Zealand Railways Corporation closed the line in 1990.

In 1988, numerous preservation groups contributed to the Ferrymead 125 celebrations in Christchurch to mark 125 years since the first public railway opened in New Zealand.

With the retirement of the first-generation diesel locomotives, the Diesel Traction Group was founded in Christchurch in 1983 with an aim to preserve these locomotives. By 1990 this group had four locomotives at their Ferrymead base, all of which were built by English Electric. Other groups and individuals started to acquire other first-generation diesel locomotives to add to their fleet, such as Steam Incorporated's two D^{A} class diesel locomotives which were purchased in 1988. Other individuals also purchased similar locomotives for preservation and based them at established heritage sites. NZR also selected numerous diesel and electric locomotives, along with two carriages, for inclusion in their own Heritage Fleet.

During this time, Ian Welch's Mainline Steam Trust emerged as a heritage operator with its fleet of preserved ex-NZR steam locomotives. This period also witnessed the creation of other groups such as the Oamaru District Steam & Rail Society, the Grand Tapawera Railroad Company/Nelson Railway Society, the narrow-gauge Blenheim Riverside Railway, and special interest groups such as the Pahiatua Railcar Society. Some groups, such as the Gisborne City Vintage Railway and the Feilding and District Steam Rail Society were formed to preserve a specific locomotive, in this case W^{A} 165 at Gisborne and the NZR&LS' W^{AB} 794 at Ferrymead.

Very few new groups emerged from 1990 to 2000. NZR's successor, Tranz Rail, did give further rolling stock to heritage groups, although a shortage of stock did see some of this recalled temporarily, while heritage diesel locomotives were leased from a private individual to alleviate the reduced number of locomotives. During this time, the NFRS became the Federation of Rail Organisations of New Zealand (FRONZ) to reflect its railway and tramway group members. In 1991 the Rail Heritage Trust of New Zealand was formed with former NZR executive Euan McQueen as its chair, to preserve former NZR buildings and rolling stock, which was leased to other groups. The Rail Heritage trust pioneered the concept of "heritage rolling stock" which was leased to various preservation groups around New Zealand by Tranz Rail. Over 200 such items of rolling stock are now leased.

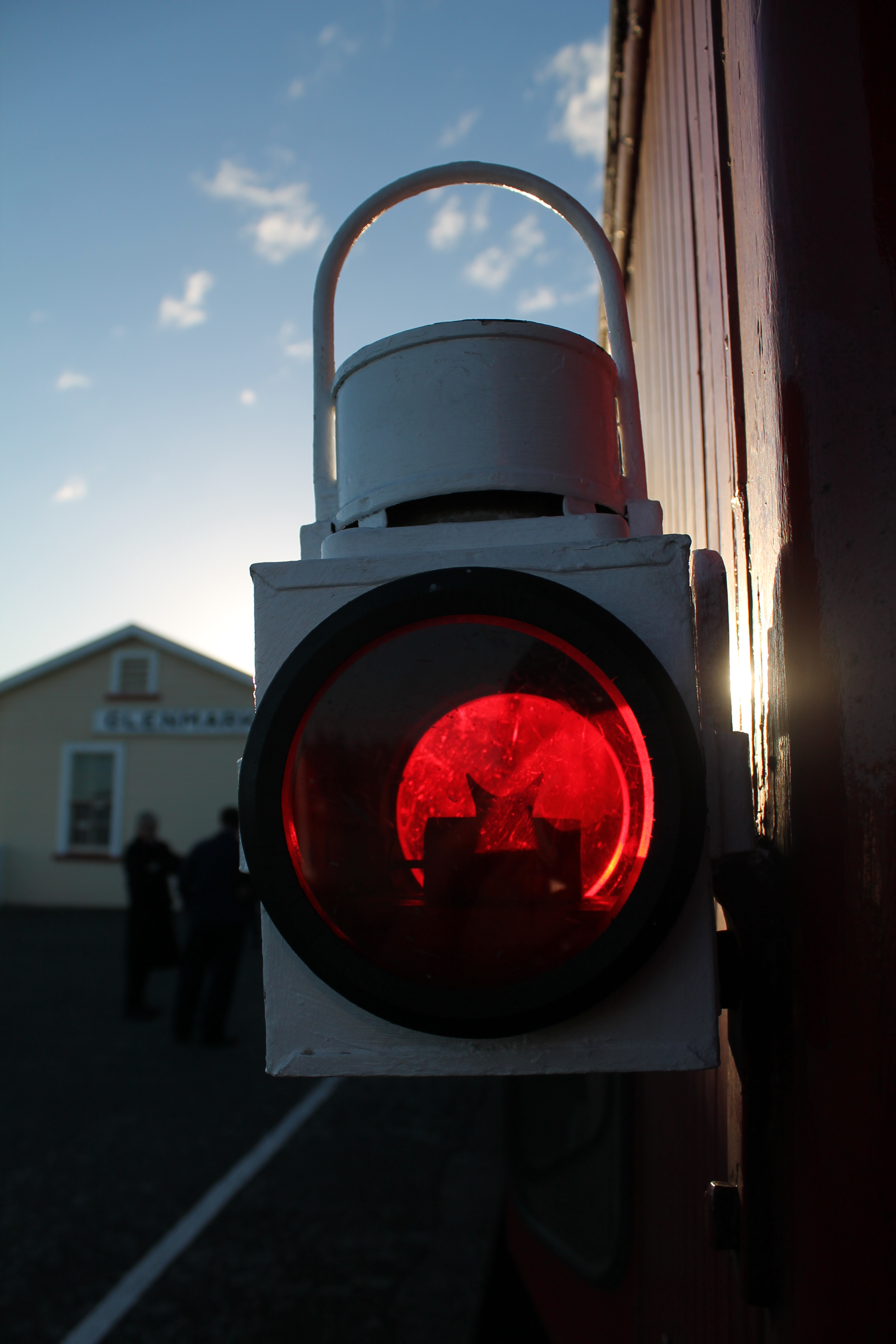
NZR Lamp on the Weka Pass Railway.

=== Current projects ===
The most ambitious heritage project to date is the Rimutaka Incline Railway, which proposes to construct from scratch a railway line over an existing historic formation abandoned in 1955. This is the route of the former Rimutaka railway and Rimutaka Incline over a distance of some 20 km, including 5 km of the 1 in 15 incline worked by the Fell centre-rail system. Although the Taieri Gorge Railway in Dunedin is a much longer and successful heritage railway at 60 km length, it has the advantage that all its track was still in place when it was set up in 1990. The Rimutaka proposal faces many obstacles from the construction of new track and formation rehabilitation works, to the building of new locomotives of the Fell type. The project is in the planning stages and it will be some years before any construction starts.

Another ambitious project is currently being undertaken by the Wellington and Manawatu Railway Trust, which has recovered the remains of WMR No. 9/NZR N 453 and aims to restore it to full operational condition. Although four ex-WMR coaches and a small number of wagons have survived into preservation, it was believed for many years that no Wellington and Manawatu Railway locomotives were still extant. (Note: N^{O} 9 is one of three WMR engines to exist - the remains of what is believed to be WMR N^{O} 8 (NZR V 452) were found in the Branxholme locomotive dump near Invercargill by Tony Bachelor in 1999, while it is believed the substantially more complete remains of WMR N^{O} 10 (NZR N 454) were dumped near Cora Lynn, further up the Midland Line.) However, the remains of WMR N^{O} 9 (N 453) were found at Bealey on the Midland Line, and in 2003 the locomotive's frames were retrieved, followed by the tender tank, underframe, and bogie frames in 2005.

The WMR Trust ultimately seek to restore N^{O} 9 to working order, and operate this locomotive on the main line. This locomotive will be paired with a replica of a WMR goods wagon to act as a support wagon on the main line.

== See also ==
- List of New Zealand railway museums and heritage lines
- Locomotives of New Zealand
- Railway enthusiast
