= Railway Enthusiasts Society =

Association in New Zealand

Coordinates: 36.923483°S 174.79423°E

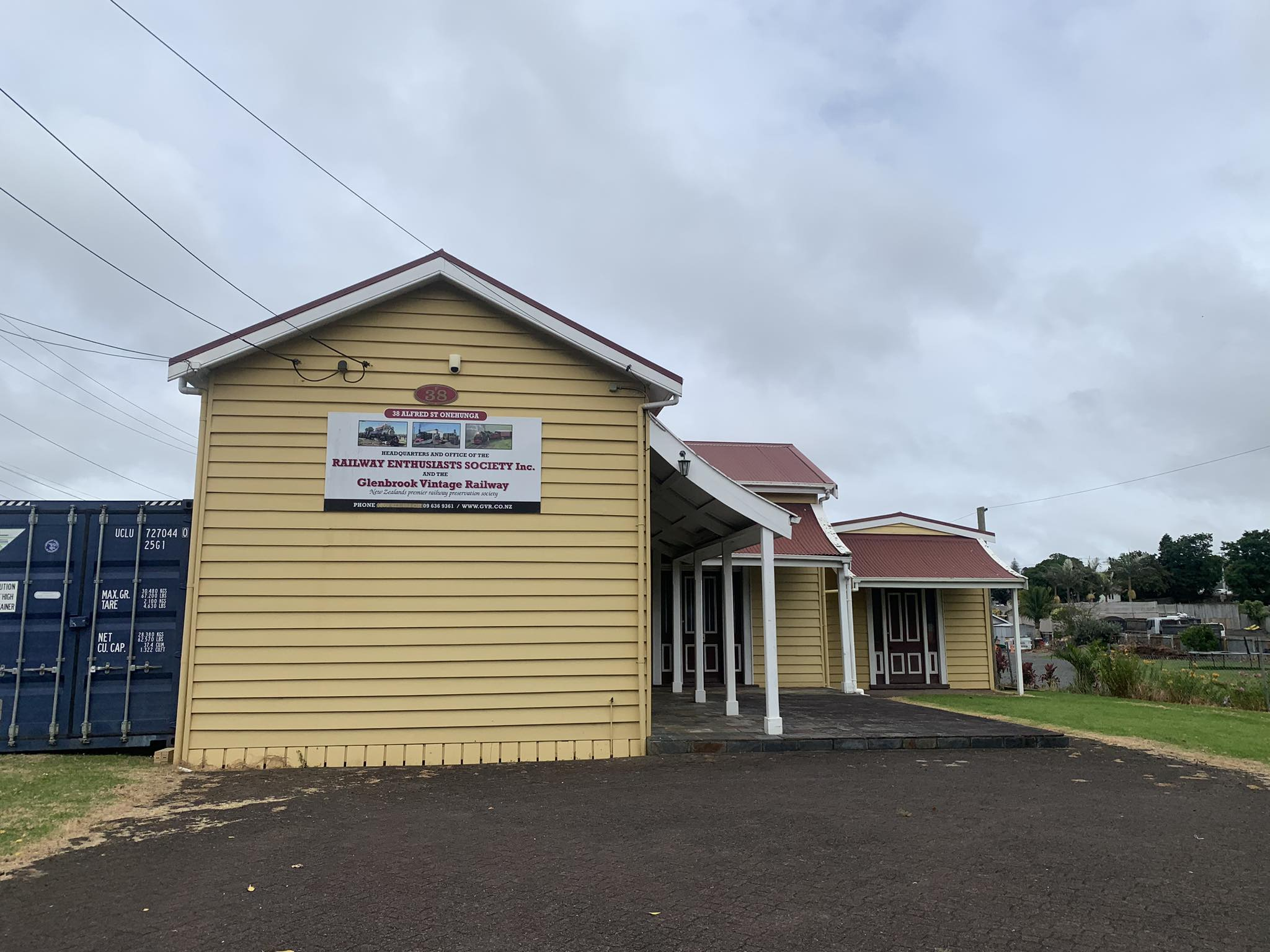
The Railway Enthusiasts Society in Onehunga

The Railway Enthusiasts Society Incorporated (known by its acronym RES) is a New Zealand railway enthusiast society formed on 17 July 1958. RES formed the Glenbrook Vintage Railway (GVR) in 1968, with GVR now forming a separate charitable trust.

== Objectives ==
The RES objectives are as follows:

- To foster an intelligent interest in railways and in their operation and development generally.
- To facilitate the exchange between railway enthusiasts of information concerning the history, development, design, construction and operation of railways in New Zealand and elsewhere.
- To encourage the preservation of private and public collections of railway photographs, films, literature and equipment.
- To publish, print, distribute and authorise periodicals, books, magazines and other printed matter on topics of railway interest or related to the Society's activities.
- To arrange trips, tours and excursions to places of railway or general interest.

The Railway Enthusiasts Society incorporates the Glenbrook Vintage Railway.

== Excursions and tours ==
=== 1960s ===
The Society has operated excursions to places of interest, both railway related and non-railway related. On the earliest excursions, extra carriages were attached to regular passenger trains on both the North Island and South Island. The Society also started operating its own charter trains for larger trips.

In 1965, three 4-8-2 J^{A} class locomotives triple-headed an 20 carriage train from Auckland to Hamilton. The Society repeated this operation with DA class diesel locomotives 1410, 1429 and 1431, on the Auckland – Mt Maunganui "Seatrain" 2000 trip and Auckland – Whangarei "Waves & Wheels" trip in 2001.

In the late 1960s and early 1970s, the end of steam traction provided the opportunity to run diesel locomotives from their bases to Auckland, for preservation as part of the Society's Glenbrook Vintage Railway project.

In 1969, small W^{W} class locomotive 480 ran a rail tour of the Midland Line from Greymouth to Christchurch, then up the Main North Line from Christchurch to Picton, before crossing the Cook Strait and up the North Island Main Trunk from Wellington to Auckland. Many people watched the train travel north. The journey was also the subject of a National Film Unit film "The Ride of 480". The locomotive had been used on many Society excursions around the Auckland area and was a favourite with many of the members who also worked on NZR at the same time.

=== 1970s ===
In 1972, J^{A} locomotive "Diana" was brought to Auckland via the Wairarapa and Taranaki regions with sister locomotive J 1236. This was the last steam train to carry passengers out of Auckland City until 1985.

In 1976, due to a shortage of available carriages, NZR announced it would no longer make carriages available to organisations for charter work. The Society assisted in the formation of the National Federation of Railway Societies (later renamed Federation of Rail Organisations of New Zealand), a national body to look after the interests of all rail heritage organisations in New Zealand. The Federation successfully negotiated for private carriages to operate on the national railway network.

In 1978, an excursion from Auckland to Tauranga through the recently opened Kaimai Tunnel, operated with three Railway Enthusiasts Society carriages and one carriage hired from Steam Incorporated.

=== 1980s ===
In 1981 and 1986, the Society operated steam-hauled trains with Glenbrook Vintage Railway's Mallet locomotive and W^{W} 480 along Quay Street in Auckland as part of tourism promotions. These lines, which served Port of Auckland wharves, were removed in the late 1980s and the trains were the last to carry passengers in Auckland's Central Business District until the opening of Britomart Transport Centre in July 2003.

In April 1985, permission was granted by NZR to the National Federation to operate trains on the NZR network. In co-operation with Steam Incorporated, the Railway Enthusiasts Society ran a special Auckland-Wellington steam centennial rail tour, pulled by J^{A} 1250 "Diana" and K^{A} 945.

In October 1988, the Railway Enthusiasts Society was involved in the Ferrymead 125 celebrations in Christchurch, commemorating the 125th anniversary of the first steam railway in New Zealand. The Society ran a rail tour from Auckland to Christchurch, hauled by J^{A} 1250. Once in Christchurch, the train set was used on excursions associated with the events, including a run from Christchurch to Timaru return and from Christchurch to Arthur's Pass and return. These latter trips also consisted of Otago Excursion Train Trust carriages and New Zealand Railways Corporation carriages pulled by J^{A} 1250 "Diana" and J 1211 "Gloria" on its first network appearance with the then recently formed Mainline Steam Trust.

=== 1990s ===
The Society continued to tours during the 1990s, despite the loss of J^{A} 1250 from service for a major overhaul.

The Silver Fern railcar ran on the North Island including the Taneatua Branch, Murupara Branch, Kinleith Branch, Cambridge Branch, Rotowaro Branch, Mission Bush Branch, Onehunga Branch, North Auckland Line to Otiria, Stratford–Okahukura Line, Waitara Branch, Kapuni Branch, Wanganui Branch and the Wairarapa Line.

In 1991, the Society operated a European and British Rail tour, organised by John Stitchbury.

On the Labour Weekend 1993, the Society ran the last steam-hauled train on the Onehunga Branch, operated with W^{W} 480. (In 2010, steam returned to Onehunga during an open day before commuter services commenced, this time using Mainline Steam's J^{A} 1275.)

In 1994, Silver Stream Railway's C 847 was steamed at Glenbrook Vintage Railway for the first time since retiring from NZR service. In early October, it was certified to run on mainline rails, and hauled the "Western Leader Flyer" between Avondale and Waitakere in coordination with Henderson's 150th anniversary celebrations. The following day the locomotive double-headed with W^{W} 480 to Huntly on an excursion. On the return journey, the train was split in half and each locomotive pulled half the train side by side between Mercer and Pukekohe, the only time in New Zealand history that two steam-powered trains have operated in this manner.

In 1995, a South Island rail tour visited all the railway lines available to passenger charter. A small DH class heavy shunting engine hauled trains between Auckland and Hamilton, EF class between Hamilton and Palmerston North, and D^{A} 1471 between Palmerston North and Wellington southbound. On the South Island, preserved DE508 pulled the train from Picton to Christchurch and the last DJ class locomotive owned by New Zealand Rail, DJ3096, was employed on the rest of the South Island itinerary. The train to Hokitika ran empty for photos, then down the Bluff Branch to the Bluff Harbour Island and along the Lyttelton Line to Lyttelton Port. The final segment from Hamilton to Pukekohe was hauled by C No. 847 and D^{A} 1471.

In 1998, with C 847 returned to the Hutt Valley, and J^{A} 1250 not ready to re-enter service yet, the Society hired J 1234 from Steam Incorporated. This locomotives pulled excursions around the upper North Island until J^{A} 1250 returned to service in 1999. J 1234 has also been used on Glenbrook Vintage Railway services, including the popular Thomas Weekends where it carries the title "Wally the Wellington Engine".

Also in 1999, the Society hired D^{A} 1410 and D^{A} 1431 from Steam Incorporated, for excursion service. They were used on excursions to destinations including Rotorua, Taumarunui, Helensville and Kaipara Flats.

=== Current excursions and tours ===
Since 2000, the Society has continued to increase its membership and trips and tours profile. Regular trips include the "Snowball Express" from Auckland to Ohakune and Mount Ruapehu by Silver Fern railcar, the "Rally Spectators Special" from Auckland to Northland, "Fieldays by Fern" to the National Agricultural Fieldays by Silver Fern railcar, and various extended tours giving thorough coverage of both the North and South Islands.

The Whangamomona Republic Day trains run from Auckland, Hamilton and Palmerston North. The 15 carriage train operated for the 2005 event was featured in Marcus Lush's 2004 Off the Rails: A Love Story television series. The Society has also operated short one-hour rides around the circuit formed by Auckland's Auckland–Newmarket Line, North Island Main Trunk Railway and North Auckland Line, usually pulled by J^{A} 1250.

Overseas Tours, open to Society members, have included visits to Canada and the northern states of the US, ralmost all the states in Australia and Great Britain.

== Museum and office ==
The Society's registered office is located at 38 Alfred Street, Onehunga, Auckland.

The building was built in 1873 and was originally sited on the corner of Princes St and Onehunga Mall, Onehunga, beside the Onehunga Branch. The tight curve at this point on the line resulted in the station platform having an irregular triangle shape. In 1964, the building was purchased by the society and moved to the block of land it presently occupies – land designated for the future Avondale–Southdown Line. It is believed to be the oldest railway station building in the country.

The Society operates a museum in the old Onehunga Railway Station, which includes a selection of railway photos, memorabilia and railway artefacts.

== Glenbrook Vintage Railway ==
The Glenbrook Vintage Railway is a project of the Railway Enthusiasts Society, managed on behalf of the Society by a separate Charitable Trust. The Charitable Trust was formed in 1972.

The members of the Glenbrook Vintage Railway Trust board are appointed by the Railway Enthusiasts Society committee, or in the case of the Member's Trustee, elected the Annual General Meeting of the Railway Enthusiasts Society.
