= New Zealand DG and DH class locomotive =

Class of 42 diesel-electric locomotives

New Zealand DG and DH class
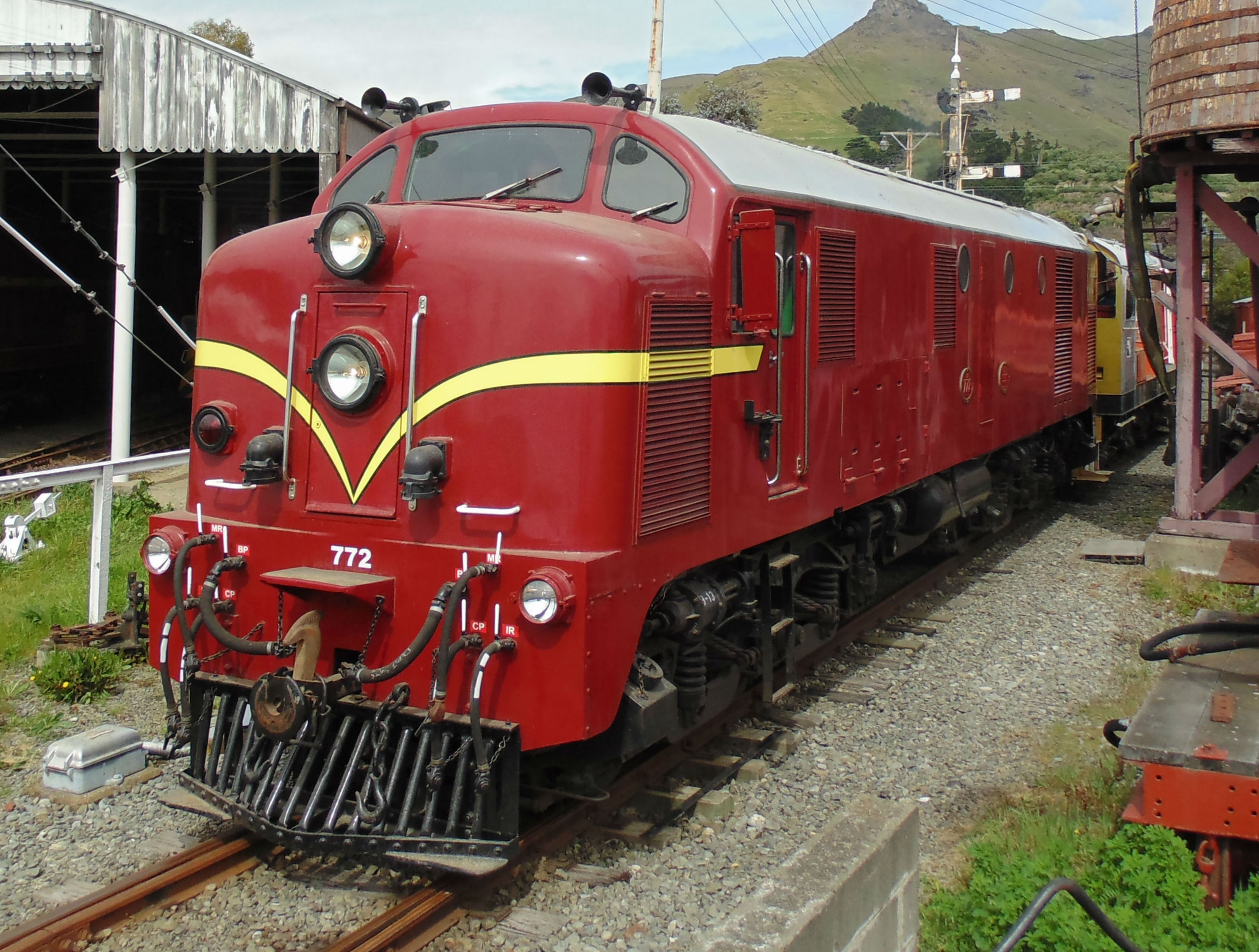
- D^{G} 772 on the Ferrymead Railway.
Type and origin
- Power type: Diesel-Electric
- Builder: English Electric and Vulcan Foundry / Robert Stephenson & Hawthorns, England
- Build date: 1955 - 1956
Specifications
- Configuration
  - UIC: A1A - A1A
- Wheel diameter: 3 ft 1 in (0.940 m)
- Minimum curve: 297 ft (90.526 m)
- Wheelbase: 37 ft 0 in (11.278 m) total, 11 ft 6 in (3.505 m) bogie
- Length: 45 ft 0 in (13.716 m) over headstocks
- Width: 8 ft 4 in (2.540 m)
- Height: 11 ft 5 1/2 in (3.493 m)
- Adhesive weight: 45.9 long tons (46.6 t) DG; 47.6 long tons (48.4 t) DH
- Loco weight: 69 long tons (70 t; 77 short tons)
- Fuel capacity: 400 imp gal (1,800 L)
- Prime mover: English Electric 6SRKT Mark 2
- RPM range: 850 rpm
- Engine type: four stroke, four valves per cylinder
- Aspiration: Turbocharged
- Traction motors: Four EE 525/2A
- Cylinders: I6
- Cylinder size: 10 in × 12 in (254 mm × 305 mm)
- Transmission: electric
- MU working: 110V, 10 notch electro-magnetic control
- Loco brake: air
- Train brakes: air
Performance figures
- Maximum speed: 60 mph (97 km/h)
- Power output: 750 hp (560 kW) gross, 685 hp (511 kW) net
- Tractive effort: 26,000 lbf (115.7 kN) DG; 29,000 lbf (129.0 kN) DH
Career
- Number in class: 31 DG; 11 DH
- Numbers: 750 - 791 (original); 2007 - 2497 (TMS)
- Locale: All of New Zealand
- First run: 6 September 1955
- Last run: 16 May 1983
- Disposition: 38 scrapped 4 preserved

The New Zealand DG and DH class (Note: Following the introduction of TMS in 1979, the class classification was capitalised, whereas previously the second letter was a smaller capital letter, that is D^{G} and D^{H}) were classes of forty-two diesel-electric locomotives operated on New Zealand's rail network between 1955 and 1983.

Between 1978 and 1980, ten of these locomotives were rebuilt with new equipments in an attempt to modernise and extend their working lives. The locomotives continued to suffer from reliability issues brought about by electrical and mechanical failures.

== Introduction ==
The New Zealand Railways Department (NZR) initially ordered 31 D^{F} class locomotives in the process of displacing steam motive power from main lines in New Zealand. The first D^{F} class was introduced in 1954 and was found to be mechanically unreliable, requiring a complete engine rebuild to improve reliability. As a result of negotiations with English Electric, the contract was amended to 10 D^{F} class and 42 D^{G} class locomotives.

The D^{G} class locomotives were a smaller version of the D^{F} class, with only one cab instead of two, and a similar Bulldog nose. Instead of assembling locomotives at its Preston works, English Electric allocated the final assembly to its sub-plants. This approach was also followed for many of that firm's diesel locomotives during the 1950s-60s. Works numbers 2254/E7821-2273/E7840 (NZR road numbers 750-769) were assembled at the Robert Stephenson & Hawthorns, while works numbers 2274/D353-2295/D374 (NZR road numbers 770-791) were assembled at the Vulcan Foundry, both being part of English Electric at the time.

The locomotives allocated in South Island were initially classified as D^{H} as they were fitted with adjustable bogies that allowed a higher maximum axle weight and tractive effort. By adjusting their spring beams, the D^{H} locomotives were able to increase their adhesive weight to 48.35 tonnes (47.59 long tons; 53.30 short tons) and the tractive effort to 130 kilonewtons (29,000 lb_{f}). Both D^{G} and D^{H} classes shared the axle loading of 11.6 tonnes (11.4 long tons; 12.8 short tons).

== In service ==
In August 1955, D^{G} 750, along with an 88-seater railcar RM 100, a D^{F} class locomotive, and a newly arrived Drewry D^{SB} class shunting locomotive, was sent to the Wanganui Industrial Fair, marking the first regular outing of D^{G} class locomotives. Following the completion of the Rimutaka Tunnel, the class took over workings in the Wairarapa area and on the Murupara Branch from the older D^{E} class. As they were relatively low-powered, these locomotives usually worked in multiple, although they did occasionally run on their own.

As enough D^{A} class locomotives were made available in the North Island, the D^{G} locomotives based on that region were transferred progressively southwards with the introduction of the rail ferry service with rail ferry GMV Aramoana in 1962. This relocation process was completed by 1976. In 1968, the D^{H} class locomotives were converted to D^{G} class standards and received the D^{G} classification, allowing the D^{H} classification to be re-used in 1978.

The class was usually relegated to "slave" status after the introduction of D^{J} class locomotives in 1968. The introduction of the new DF class locomotives from 1979 further displaced the DG class.

=== Renumbering ===
The introduction of the Traffic Monitoring System (TMS) in 1979 saw the locomotives being renumbered DG2007 - DG2497.

== Rebuilds ==
In the late 1970s, the D^{G} class was reaching the end of its designated working life with a litany of problems:

- Mechanical and electrical failures were occurring on a regular basis.
- The EE 6SKRT engine blocks were cracking due to premature wear.
- Working conditions on the locomotives were known to be poor as well. There were no crew amenities, and the cabs were draughty.

In an attempt to modernise and extend the operational lifespan of the D^{G} class locomotives for a decade to 15 years, Chief Mechanical Engineer Graham Alecock was instructed to create a proposal to equip them with new cabs that would be more crew-friendly and better equipped. The decision was made to rebuild D^{G} 760 (later renumbered DG2111 with the implementation of the Traffic Monitoring System), which was due for an overhaul at the Hillside Workshops, as a prototype for the rebuilds. D^{G} 760 was released from Hillside in August 1978 as the first of an eventual ten rebuilds to be completed between 1978 and 1980, when DG2330 was released into service in November 1980.

The NZR designed the new cab in-house and contracted its Westport Workshops to build them on behalf of Hillside Workshops, which led to some issues with fitting cabs to the locomotives. The cab was larger than the original D^{G} cab, which required the front low nose to be shortened. The whole assembly had a pronounced box-like shape, with 45° angles to the cab roof and a low nose. The new cab had four windscreens instead of the original three, while the low nose had a larger doorway to access the new Westinghouse 26L air-brake equipment and also to give provision for a short walkway on either side of the nose. The small windows were the same as those used on the DX class locomotives to improve standardisation on locomotives.

In mechanical respects, the front traction motor blower was moved to a position above the main generator, and new thermostat valves were installed to prevent the overheating issues that had affected the locomotives under load. The original Westinghouse A7EL brake system was replaced by the more modern 26L system, which was actuated by a new push-button console in the cab. The traction motors were also upgraded, and welding repairs were carried out on the 6SKRT engine blocks. Some blocks were later sent to the United States for repairs using the Metalock treatment, which was later considered a failure as the blocks cracked again, rendering the treatment a waste of money.

The locomotives also underwent several minor changes. Steps were fitted to the rear to allow access to the roof, external door handles and step-ladders were fitted to the middle set of engine room doors, and an automated handbrake system was installed. The front ladders were also fitted to allow access to the cab windows, some of which were integrated into the sheet metal profile edge from the frame to the leading headstock. Both horns were relocated to the front of the cab, although the rebuilt D^{G} 760 had three - two forward facing on the cab front, with one behind the cab.

Although the railway unions - the Locomotive Engineers Association (LEA) and the Engine-drivers, Firemen, and Cleaners Association (EFCA) - were pleased with the cab design, which took into account their input from the early design phases, the locomotives proved to be mechanically unreliable. They were put into service hauling freight trains on the Main South Line and occasionally on the Midland Line. Even though their new cab was designed with a provision to operate them over the Otago Central Railway in mind, very few of the re-cabbed locomotives ever worked on that line.

10 additional DG class locomotives - 9 built by Vulcan Foundry and one by RS&H - received an "A-grade" overhaul to work as trailing B-units for the rebuilt locomotives. These locomotives did not receive new cabs and, therefore, were not driven in regular service. Several other locomotives of this type also received the updated Westinghouse 26L brake system and the NZR-designed push-button control stand.

The locomotives continued to suffer from reliability issues caused by electrical and mechanical failures, and they were later prohibited from running with the Mitsubishi DJ class and General Motors DF class locomotives, although they did sometimes run with the DJ class past this time. It was decided to start withdrawing those locomotives that had not been overhauled to provide parts for those that had, and so the first to be withdrawn, D^{G} 765, was treated on the fact it had an engine block in good condition.

== Withdrawals ==
By 1983, most of the unrebuilt DG class locomotives had been withdrawn from service, while the rebuilt ones continued until they either encountered mechanical issues or required major repairs. On August 28, 1983, the NZR ran a "Farewell to the DG Class" excursion between Christchurch and Arthur's Pass on the Midland line. The first and last DG class locomotives, rebuilt DG2007 and unrebuilt DG2468, hauled the excursion and marked the end of the original DG class in regular service. The following month, DG2007 failed when it threw a con rod through the engine block and was placed in storage, while DG2468 was sold to the Weka Pass Railway shortly after.

In 1983, Dunedin-based machinery dealers W. Rietveld Limited were contracted by the NZR to scrap the rebuilt DG class locomotives, which were stored in Dunedin. At the time, these locomotives were mostly unserviceable due to mechanical failures or had been laid up with the arrival of more modern motive power. Some had their EE 525 traction motors removed by the NZR and sold to the National Federation of Railway Societies for other groups who owned the DG class locomotives.

The withdrawn locomotives were stored at the former sidings at Pelichet Bay and stripped of all useful parts before being forwarded to Sims-PMI for scrapping at their Dunedin premises. The first four locomotives to be moved to Pelichet Bay were numbers 2036, 2140, 2105, and 2347. They were later followed by numbers 2007, 2290, 2111, and 2439. The last two, DG2128 and DG2330 remained at the Dunedin Locomotive Depot for a while as Rietveld hoped to sell them to an overseas concern. This did not eventuate, and the two locomotives were towed to Pelichet Bay for stripping - they were the last two rebuilt DG class locomotives in existence.

Rietveld did not scrap some of the unique cabs from these locomotives. Instead, they removed them intact and held several at their Abbotsford reclaim site, including that of DG2007. Darryl Bond, a part-owner of DG2376, purchased the cab of DG2140.

== Preservation ==
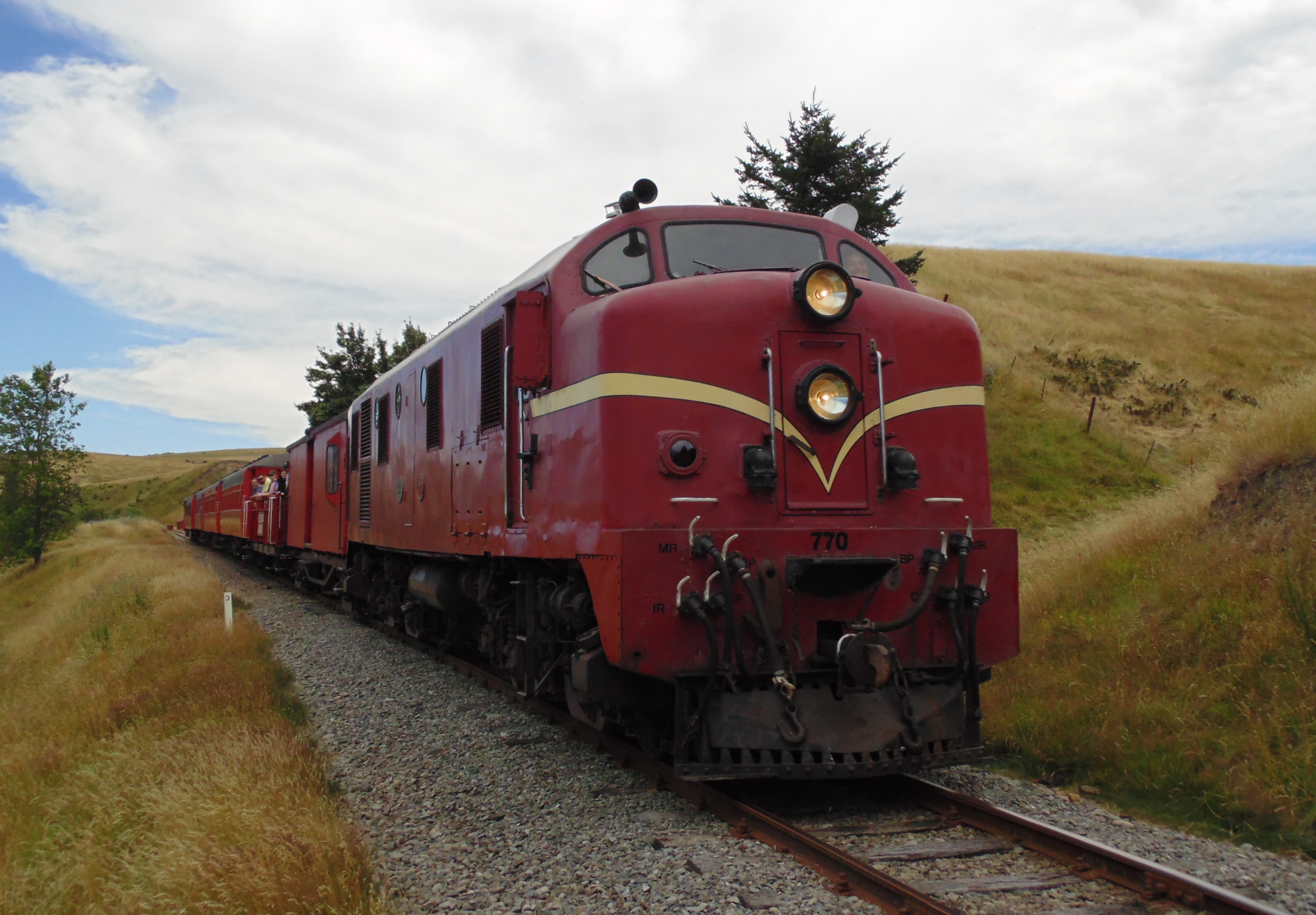
D^{G} 770 on the Weka Pass Railway.

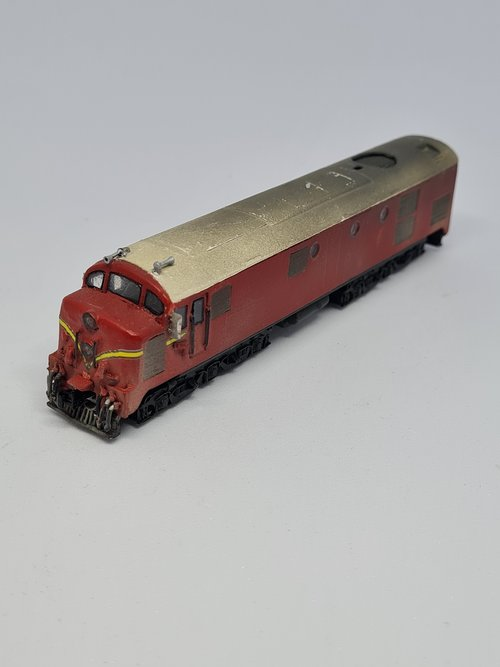
A NZ120 model D^{G} class locomotive.

With the phasing out of the DG class in the early 1980s, several locomotives were purchased for preservation:

- D^{G} 770/DG2232 was saved by the Weka Pass Railway in 1983. In 1988, the society replaced its TMS number with the railway's name painted on the rear of the cab door, while keeping its 'International Orange' livery. In 1995, the locomotive was taken out of service due to a cracked bogie. To fix the issue, the railway fully overhauled a bogie taken from D^{G} 783 and fitted it to this locomotive. In 1997, it was repainted in the traditional NZR red livery with larch yellow nose stripes on its nose, as it was initially introduced. In 2014, the locomotive was taken out of service once more for the replacement of its four-cylinder air compressor, but it has ever since returned to service. D^{G} 770, along with D^{G} 791, is available for use when fire bans are in place or when A 428 was taken out of service.
- D^{G} 772/ DG2255 was saved by the Diesel Traction Group in 1983. In 1988, the locomotive was repainted in the traditional NZR red livery with larch yellow nose stripes for the Rail 125 celebrations, during which it hauled its first excursion train with D^{E} 511 to Springfield and back. During the early 1990s, D^{G} 772 pulled a few more excursions, including on the Otago Central Railway and the Midland Line. Then in 1995, it was loaned to the Weka Pass Railway to cover their D^{G} 770 while it was out of service for repairs. D^{G} 772 was placed in storage from the mid to late 1990s until 2002, when it was decided to overhaul the locomotive to bring it up to current mainline standards. As part of this overhaul, the locomotive's Westinghouse A7EL brake system was replaced by the newer 26L system. The locomotive was also fitted with ditch lights, a VHF radio, and an events recorder to allow it to run on the mainline. The overhaul was completed in 2009, just in time for the 125th anniversary of the Otago Central Railway. Before the anniversary, D^{G} 772 was leased to the Weka Pass Railway for running-in purposes. Since then, the locomotive has run several excursions and has occasionally been seen running on the Ferrymead Railway at the Ferrymead Heritage Park.
- D^{G} 783/ DG2376 was saved by Roger Redward for his proposed Southern Rail Museum in Prebbleton. However, the NZR decided to repossess all of Roger's collections held on its property due to his failure to make several rent payments in 1988. After that, the locomotive was sold to the Weka Pass Railway, who needed spare parts to maintain their two locomotives. The locomotive was then taken to their Waipara yard and gradually stripped of most of its useful parts. In 2005, Weka Pass Railway decided to sell the remains of the locomotive under the condition that it would be removed from Waipara after purchase. Darryl Bond and Evan Batchelor, two rail fans, purchased the locomotive and moved it to the Ferrymead Heritage Park, where it was planned to restore the locomotive. The front bogie was repaired, the body was largely de-rusted, and parts were acquired to begin restoring the locomotive to service in the later International Orange livery, which it never carried in service. It is planned to be fitted with the cab from DG2140. In late 2013, the locomotive was moved to Oamaru.
- D^{G} 791/ DG2468 was also saved by the Weka Pass Railway in 1983. In 1988, the society replaced its TMS number with the railway's name painted on the rear of the cab door, while keeping its 'International Orange' livery. In 1997, the locomotive was repainted in the traditional NZR red livery with larch yellow nose stripes on its nose, as it was initially introduced. D^{G} 791, along with D^{G} 770, is available for use when fire bans are in place or when A 428 is out of service.

In addition:

- D^{G} 789/ DG2445 was being considered to be added to the NZR's Heritage Fleet. However, the locomotive had a cracked engine block, which did not fit to their policy of operating Heritage Fleet locomotives. Due to the extent of the cracking, it was considered to be uneconomic to repair. As a result, the locomotive was scrapped by Sims Pacific Metal Industries in Dunedin.
- D^{G} 790/ DG2451 was also saved by Roger Redward, but it was later scrapped after it became a casualty of the protracted dispute between its new owner and the NZR.
