= Diesel Traction Group =

The Diesel Traction Group (DTG) is the Christchurch-based operator of a fleet of ex-New Zealand Railways Department diesel-electric locomotives. The fleet represents a full collection of New Zealand locomotive classes built by the English Electric Company and is a historically significant collection of early New Zealand diesel traction. All of the DTG's locomotives are owned by individual members through the sale of shareholdings.

== History ==
The DTG was formed in September 1983 to preserve one of the D^{G} class locomotives that were being withdrawn from service at the same time. D^{G} 772 (TMS DG 2255) was purchased from NZR and moved to Ferrymead on 17 October 1983. During 1984, the DTG investigated purchasing a second DG, this time one of the ten that were fitted with a new cab during their last major overhaul in the early 1980s, but the proposal did not proceed.

In October 1988, D^{G} 772 was upgraded to mainline mechanical certification condition, repainted in its original colour scheme and used in the Ferrymead 125 celebrations, including a mainline excursion to Springfield. Further mainline charters to Dunedin, Clyde and Arthur's Pass followed.

The Group's second locomotive was Drewry T^{R} 22 (TMS TR 91), one of the early designs of the T^{R} class which entered service in 1939. It was offered for sale by tender and was delivered to Ferrymead in July 1985 without an engine or transmission. These vital items of equipment were purchased separately from NZR stores the following year and after installation into the locomotive, it was recommissioned into service a year after its arrival. T^{R} 22 was then placed on lease to the Ferrymead Railway as a light shunter and was later sold to the railway's operators.

In November 1987, the Group's members purchased two D^{E} class locomotives, D^{E}'s 511 and 512 (TMS DE 1412 and DE 1429), from Dunedin where they had been recently withdrawn from shunting duties. They were delivered to Ferrymead with other rolling stock the same month. D^{E} 511 was repainted in the original colours and certified to mainline mechanical standard for participation in the Ferrymead 125 event the following year, which included shared operation of the Springfield excursion with D^{G} 772. Following this, D^{E} 511 is now undergoing repairs after being in storage. DE 1429 retained its latter-day TMS number and colours in preservation and had its engine overhauled in 1989–1990. It is currently on loan to the Weka Pass Railway.

In 1989, the DTG purchased D^{I} class locomotive D^{I} 1102 (TMS DI 1820), along with a number of spare parts and a complete diesel engine from class leader D^{I} 1100 (TMS DI 1808), which was then being scrapped at Hutt Workshops. Following the completion of D^{G} 772 in 2009, the DTG has turned their attention to restoring this locomotive to working order for use on the mainline. It is now undergoing testing and certification for mainline running.

In 2009, the DTG was named as the custodians of FRONZ's English Electric D^{F} class locomotive, D^{F} 1501, after it was removed from its plinth in Auckland at the request of the site owners, scrap dealer Sims PMI. The locomotive was towed south in January 2009, and the DTG have stated their intention is to restore D^{F} 1501 to working order at some time in the future. At present, the locomotive is receiving preventative maintenance and will be displayed in the National Railway Museum of New Zealand.

== Location ==
The DTG is based at Ferrymead Heritage Park, and their locomotives are used on passenger trains and heavy shunting services on the Ferrymead Railway. In the past, the group's locomotives have also ventured out onto other heritage/tourist railways and charters on the national rail network or visited other heritage railways. The DTG is a member of the Federation of Rail Organisations of New Zealand.

== Fleet ==
=== Locomotives ===
Key:	In service	In service, Mainline Certified	Under overhaul/restoration/repair	Stored	Static display	Scrapped

Original Class and Number	TMS Number	Builder	Builders Number	Year built	Arrived	Notes
D^{E} 511	DE 1412	English Electric	1749	1951	1987	Currently operational.
D^{E} 512	DE 1429	English Electric	1750	1951	1987	Currently operational. On loan to the Weka Pass Railway.
D^{F} 1501		English Electric	1927	1954	2009	Owned by FRONZ. D^{F} 1501 arrived by rail in 2009, and will eventually be restored. Briefly numbered D^{F} 1301 from 1963 to its withdrawal in 1975 to allow the 15xx number series to be used on the Phase III DA class locomotives then entering service. Under restoration.
D^{G} 772	DG 2255	English Electric	2276/D355	1955	1983	The first locomotive owned by the DTG, restored in 2009 to operating condition with mainline accreditation. Originally entered service as D^{H} 772.
D^{I} 1102	DI 1820	English Electric	A121	1966	1992	Only surviving ex-NZR diesel locomotive in preservation to have been built at English Electric's Rocklea, Qld. plant. Mainline certified.

=== Wagons ===
The DTG also possesses a small collection of five ex-NZR goods wagons, several of which are loaned by the Rail Heritage Trust.

Key:	In Service	In Service, Main Line Certified	Under Overhaul/Restoration	Stored	Static Display	Scrapped

Original number	TMS number	Builder	Type	Notes
K^{S} 4370	KS 10382	NZR Hutt Workshops	Steel-bodied four-wheeled box wagon. Sliding load doors.	K^{S}-2 variant.
L^{C} 43098	LC 55593		Steel-bodied four-wheeled 'highsider' wagon.	L^{C}-3 variant. Parked in the DTG shelter, and holds a spare EE 6CSKRT diesel engine (ex-DI 1808).
V^{B} 306	VB 75		Wooden-bodied bogie frozen meat wagon.	V^{B}-1 variant, built in 1925. Arrived in 2003.
Z 330	Z 806		Wooden-bodied bogie 'roadsider' goods wagon.	Z-14 variant, built in 1941 for use on express trains. Z 330 is fitted with x-25330 'Timken' roller bearing bogies, allowing maximum speeds of 80 km/h when used on express duties. Z 330 is currently undergoing repairs after being stored.
Z^{P} 1083	ZP 5260	Mitsubishi Heavy Industries, 1968.	Steel-bodied bogie box wagon. Sliding load doors.	Later became ZP 14744. Owned by the Rail Heritage Trust, and arrived in 2003. Used as the group's support wagon.

== See also ==
- Railway preservation in New Zealand
