= New Zealand DJ class locomotive =

Class of diesel-electric locomotives

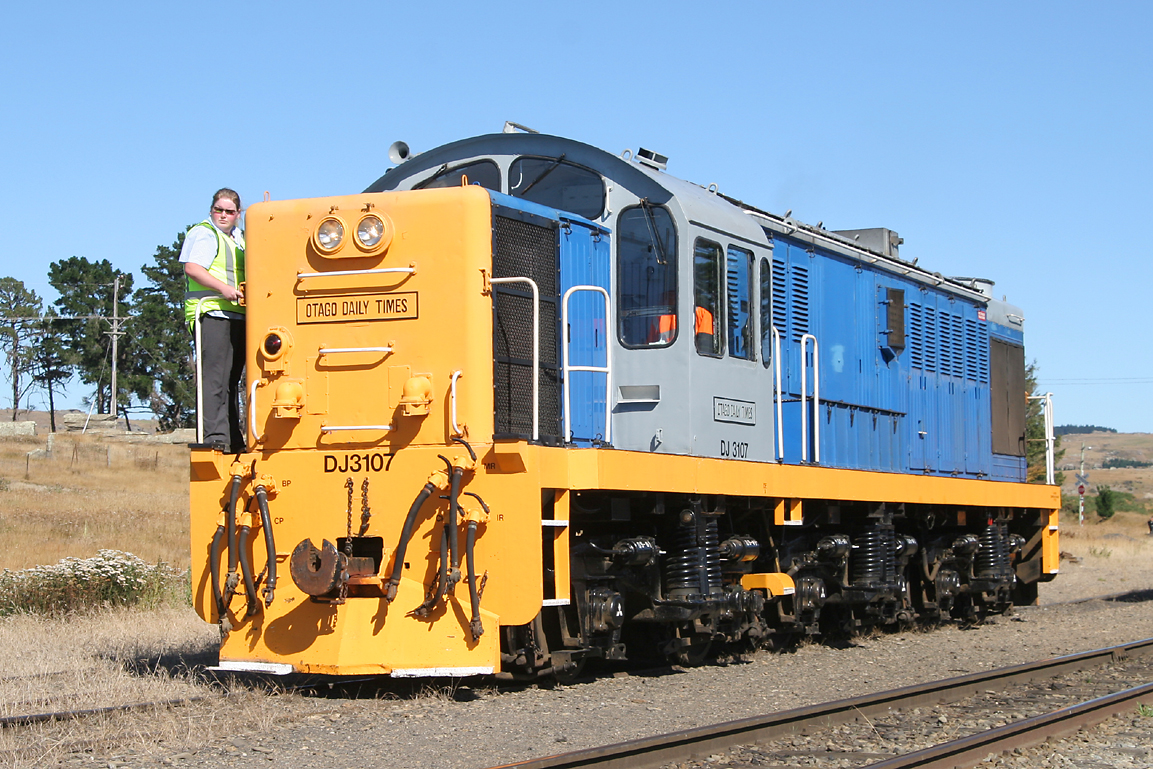
- DJ3107 "Otago Daily Times" on the Taieri Gorge Railway in March 2007
Type and origin
- Power type: Diesel-electric
- Builder: Mitsubishi Heavy Industries, Japan
- Build date: 1968–1969
Specifications
- Configuration
  - UIC: Bo-Bo-Bo
- Gauge: 3 ft 6 in (1,067 mm)
- Length: 14.1 metres (46 ft 3 in)
- Axle load: 10.66 tonnes (10.49 long tons; 11.75 short tons)
- Adhesive weight: 64.0 tonnes (63.0 long tons; 70.5 short tons)
- Loco weight: 64.0 tonnes (63.0 long tons; 70.5 short tons)
- Prime mover: Caterpillar D398
- RPM range: 1300 rpm
- Engine type: V12 Diesel engine
- Traction motors: Six
- Cylinders: 12
- Cylinder size: 159 mm × 203 mm (6.3 in × 8.0 in)
Performance figures
- Maximum speed: 97 km/h (60 mph)
- Power output: 672 kW (901 hp)
- Tractive effort: 128 kN (29,000 lb_{f})
Career
- Number in class: 64
- Numbers: 1200 - 1263 (original); 3009 - 3689 (TMS)
- Locale: South Island
- First run: 31 March 1968– March 1969
- Retired: 1986–1991
- Current owner: Dunedin Railways (8); Mainline Steam Heritage Trust (2)
- Disposition: 55 scrapped 9 preserved

The New Zealand DJ class locomotive (Note: Following the introduction of TMS in 1979, the class classification was capitalised, whereas previously the second letter was a smaller capital letter, that is D^{J}) is a type of diesel-electric locomotive in service on the New Zealand rail network. The class were built by Mitsubishi Heavy Industries and introduced from 1968 to 1969 for the New Zealand Railways Department (NZR) with a modernisation loan from the World Bank to replace steam locomotives in the South Island, where all of the class members worked most of their lives. Nine of the locomotives remain in use, mainly with Dunedin Railways.

They are the second class of locomotive in New Zealand to utilise the Bo-Bo-Bo wheel arrangement, the other classes being the EW class and the EF class. In both cases, this wheel arrangement was used to provide a lower axle-load due to track conditions as well, particularly in the case of the DJs, a shorter wheelbase more suited to sharp curvature on secondary or tertiary routes.

== Introduction ==
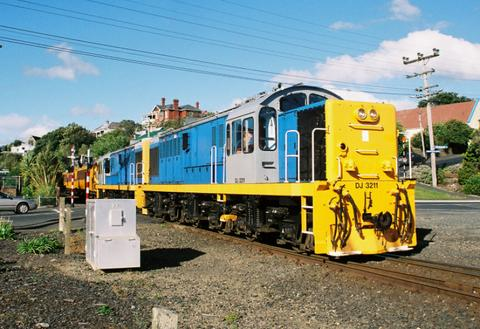
Two DJ class locomotives in service for Dunedin Railways

With the ongoing introduction of diesel locomotives to the New Zealand railway network, various options to replace steam traction in the South Island were investigated. The new locomotives would need to be capable of both mainline running and also be light enough to work on secondary main lines, the West Coast system, west of Otira and the Main North Line, which would not be upgraded before 1979 to support the 13-14 ton axle load of modern diesel locomotive classes and on weight-restricted branch lines, particularly in Otago and Southland. The locomotives were specified to have a top speed of 62 miles (100 km) and max axle load of 10.7 tons were specified.

A World Bank modernisation loan was obtained in December 1965 for a four-year term to December 1969, allowing the Cabinet Works Committee in February 1966 to call tenders for 55 1,000-1,200 horsepower diesel locomotives for the South Island, and 34 locomotives of 1400-1600 horsepower to complete North Island dieselisation. The expectation was that the General Motors Electro-Motive Division (EMD) offering would win the tender - either the EMD G8 (NZR D^{B} class) or EMD G12 (NZR D^{A} class) locomotives already in use by NZR for both islands or the newer EMD G18 model, which was recommended. In addition, five of the English Electric D^{I} class locomotives were already in service with NZR at the same time and were the prototype for the tender specifications.

On 1 August 1966, the order was placed with Mitsubishi Heavy Industries of Japan for 55 Bo-Bo-Bo diesel-electric locomotives. Mitsubishi offered tenders 25-35% lower in cost than its main rivals, at a unit cost of £44,000, compared with General Motors £72,000, English Electric £70,000 and Associated Electrical Industries £58,000. Both General Motors and English Electric were shocked to lose the South Island locomotive contract. The World Bank, the pressure to accept one of the low Japanese tenders, was not out of any preference for a specific manufacturer, but out of growing dissatisfaction in Washington by the administrations of Lyndon B. Johnson and later Richard Nixon for the use of the World Bank development loans for infrastructure projects in advanced nations. The Minister of Finance, Robert Muldoon, clashed with United States' officials regarding New Zealand's use of the World Bank, the World Bank, therefore, financed only low tenders which delivered locomotives quickly to complete conversion of NZR to diesel traction at the earliest date possible.

The final cost of the DJ locomotives did not offer the cost advantage expected, and this was only partly due to inflation and differences in exchange rates. After delivery of all the DJ class, the cost of 69 DJ and DI was $10.204 million compared with $10.251 million for the 54 DA class locomotives delivered on average 18 months earlier.

The second delayed order of nine was placed on 1 November 1967. The cost of these additional locomotives was met by the balance of the World Bank loan.

== In service ==
The DJ class locomotives were designed as a versatile mixed-traffic diesel-electric locomotive capable of being used in mainline service or on branch lines where their light axle loading of 10.66 tonnes gave them an advantage on lightly laid lines over heavier types such as the DG class A1A-A1A and DI class Co-Co locomotives, which had been built for similar purposes. When working in multiple with these classes, it was common practice to have the DJ as the lead locomotive due to its superior cab conditions and visibility.

Following the arrival of the full order of the DJ class locomotives, steam traction on freight ended on the East Coast in March 1969 and the West Coast in July 1969. When the DJ class were ordered, no provision was made for train heating, which prevented the class from being used on the overnight expresses. Eventually, steam heat vans were transferred from the North Island Night Limited when the Silver Star was delivered a year late in November 1971.

The DJ class were the first locomotives in New Zealand to employ an AC/DC transmission; all previous diesel locomotive types had DC/DC transmissions. AC current was rectified to DC using silicon rectifiers feeding the traction motors.

They were also turbocharged with a 1,050 horsepower (780 kW) rating, but were only safe for five minutes an hour at that rating, with operation at 975 horsepower (727 kW) for an hour on, and 835 horsepower (623 kW) for the next hour. The locomotives were not reliable for the entire length of their first passenger use on the 11-hour run, summer South Island Limited in 1968–69 with two DJ locomotives, or one DJ and one DG locomotive pulling up to 14 carriages on the service.

=== Southerner Blue ===
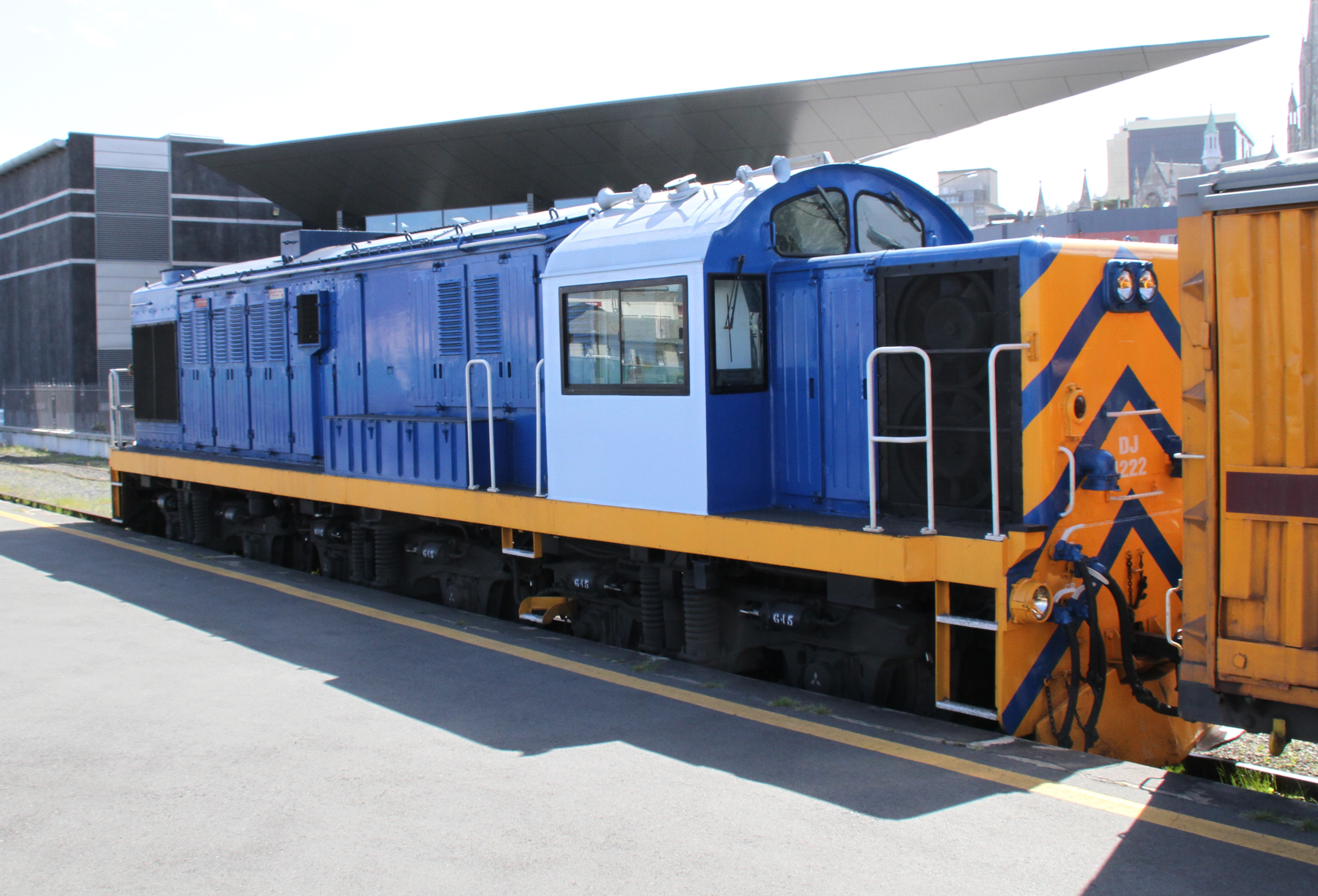
DJ3228 (D^{J} 1222) preserved in "Southerner Blue" livery at Dunedin in 2017

Following the introduction of the Southerner passenger train between Christchurch and Invercargill in December 1970, the DJ class were chosen as the preferred locomotive for this train. Three locomotives were specifically repainted in a new blue livery dubbed "Southerner Blue" to match the train, although it was not unusual to see a red DJ locomotive hauling the Southerner on occasion. With fewer stops, the DJ class hauling the lighter, 200 ton eight carriage Southerner offered a slightly higher stop-to-start average speed than the steam-hauled South Island Limited, with 47 miles (76 km) average speed between Ashburton and Timaru and between Ashburton and Christchurch. On the Picton Express the DJ class cut running times by more than an hour, on the steep route with three 1/35 grades in 1976-8 and hauling loads of up to 250 passengers. Other passenger duties included the Christchurch - Greymouth passenger train (rebranded as the TranzAlpine from November 1987) following the end of railcar services in June 1976.

The greatest improvement offered by the DJ over the J^{A} class steam locomotives was in hill climbing particularly on the Greymouth-Otira section of the Midland line and in moving heavy slow freight.

=== New engines ===
Although soundly built, the locomotives were plagued initially by reliability issues. The NZR Chief Mechanical Engineer concluded the correct rating of the DJ class engines at 797 horsepower (594 kW). The locomotives suffered from overheating problems and turbocharger blowouts. Unavailability and maintenance cost excesses meant NZR management viewed the class poorly compared with the well-tested D^{A} class.

NZR did not want to re-engine the DJ class with new Caterpillar engines and gained Labour Government approval in 1973 to re-engine the DJ class with 1,200 horsepower (890 kW) English Electric Paxman Ventura engines. This was not financed and in November 1977 it was announced that the DJ class would receive new Caterpillar D398 engines, the same type used in the Silver Fern railcars and later DH class locomotives. The new engines were rated at 900 horsepower (670 kW) but downrated to 840 horsepower (630 kW), with additional modifications fitting rectangular header tanks to the locomotives' roofs above the radiator and fitting additional air intakes, nicknamed "flyswatters" due to their shape. At the same time, the locomotives were repainted in a variation of the "International Orange" livery, with blue in place of orange and large white numbers on the long hoods. These new engines and modifications made the DJ class more reliable.

=== Renumbering ===
The introduction of the Traffic Monitoring System (TMS) in 1979 saw the locomotives renumbered.

=== Replacement ===
Following the arrival of more powerful locomotives in the South Island such as the General Motors DF class and General Electric DX class locomotives in 1979 and 1988 respectively, the DJ class were cascaded to lesser duties on branch lines or as freight locomotives. Due to their multiple-unit capabilities, the DJ class were regularly seen operating in multiple with members of the DG class, or less frequently with members of the DF, DI and DX classes. The class were also used in banker service on the West Coast, with at two locomotives at any time used to assist trains out of Reefton across the Reefton Saddle.

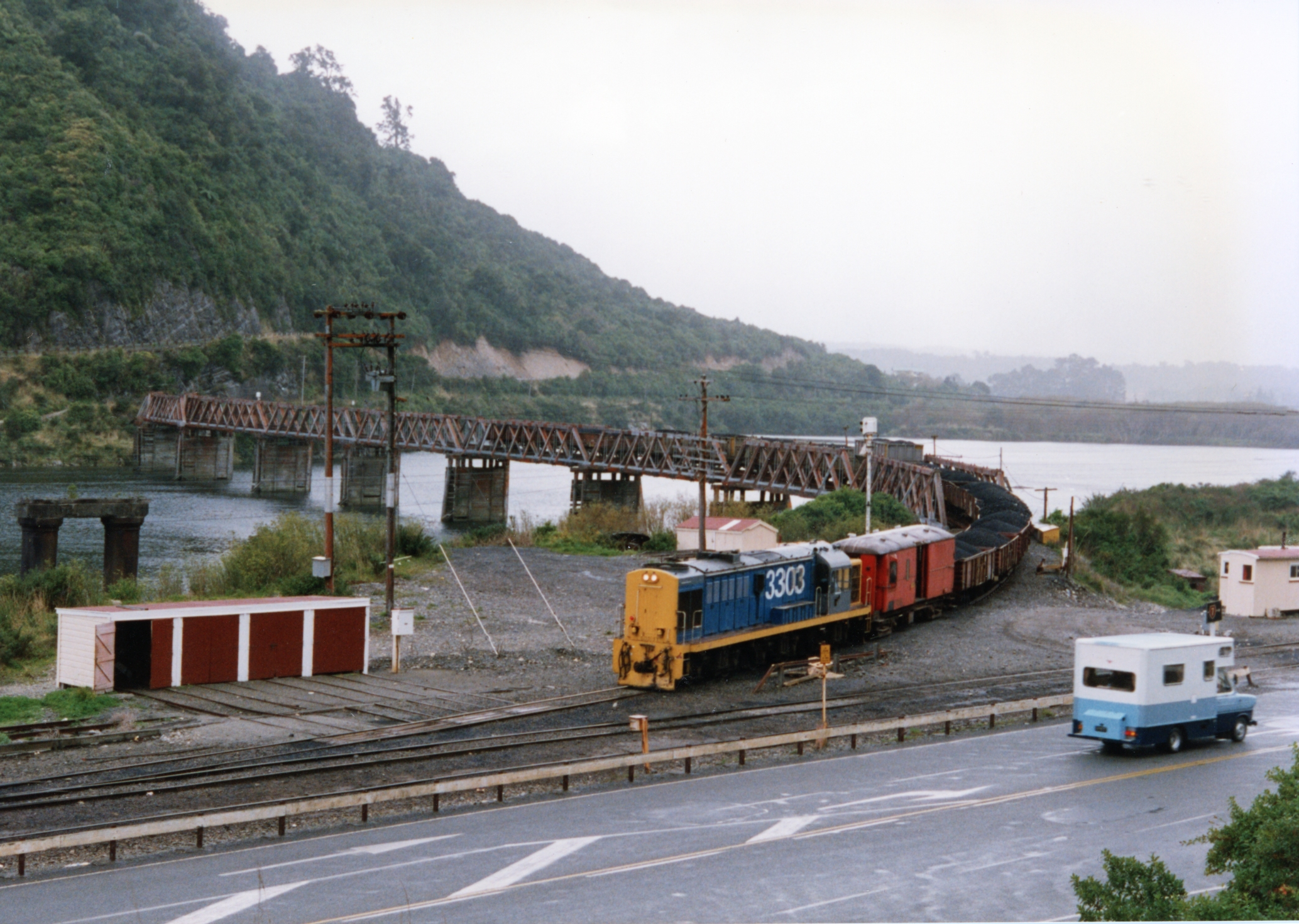
DJ3303 on the Cobden Bridge on the Rapahoe Branch in 1987.

Although largely obsolete by this time, the DJ class received a stay of execution on the West Coast in the late 1980s following the introduction of the DC class locomotives from the North Island. The West Coast branch lines to Rapahoe and Ngakawau had not been upgraded with heavier rail to carry larger trains and the DC class hauling heavy coal trains were damaging the track. Due to their light axle loading, no major track upgrades had been required to allow the DJ class to enter service in 1968. Their use on West Coast coal trains allowed the track upgrades to be deferred.

== Withdrawals ==
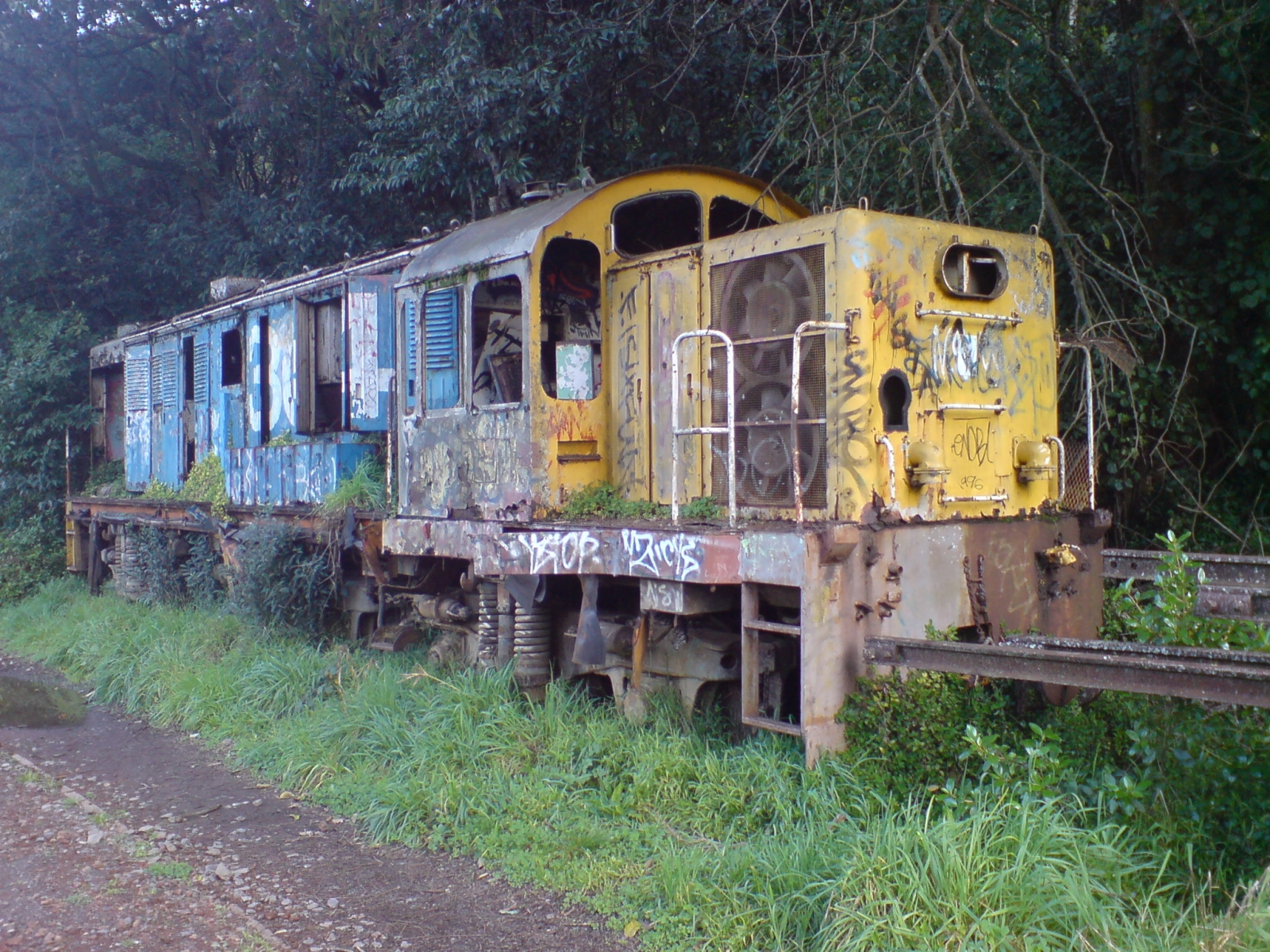
DJ3044 in a decrepit state, stored at Mainline Steam Parnell, Auckland, before it was dismantled for spare parts in May 2011

The first DJ class locomotives to be withdrawn from service were 1205 and 1220, which were withdrawn in April 1973 after both were involved in a collision at Balclutha on 20 December 1972. The first mainstream withdrawals of the DJ class took place in September 1986 when 3073, 3165, 3263, 3355, 3361, 3447, 3453 and 3608 were withdrawn from service; five of the locomotives were placed in storage in Invercargill.

In March 1988, the Railways Corporation began progressively introducing single-manning of trains. The DJ class, along with the DA class, was deemed unsuitable for single-manning due to their cab configurations. Withdrawals continued until the penultimate locomotive, DJ3159, was withdrawn in July 1992.

To prolong the service life of the remaining locomotives as they were prepared for withdrawal, most of the DJ class locomotives had their top power notch made inoperable, with the exception of 3009, 3015, 3021, 3038 and 3044, which were at the time being used to haul the Southerner. The last DJ-hauled Southerner service took place in June 1990, although one final instance was recorded in February 1991 when a DJ hauled the train from Invercargill to Dunedin.

One locomotive, DJ3303 (D^{J} 1229) was given a reprieve on withdrawal in March 1988 after it was sold to the Ohai Railway Board (ORB) for use on their line between Wairio and Ohai. At the time the DJ was the largest industrial locomotive in New Zealand and was repainted in the ORB's yellow livery as their No. 3.

After New Zealand Rail Limited took over running trains for Ohai Railway Board in 1991, DJ3303 was placed in storage before being sold for preservation to Mainline Steam. Ten of the class were also moved to Hutt Workshops in 1990 for storage as a back-up in case of traffic increases or failures of other locomotives, or possible sale to other buyers. Most were later scrapped, apart from three moved to Upper Hutt.

The last DJ class locomotive in service for New Zealand Rail was DJ3096 (D^{J} 1209), initially part of its Heritage Fleet in the 1990s. The locomotive hauled a few special excursions for the Railway Enthusiasts Society in the South Island. In 1995, the locomotive was transferred to Hutt Workshops in the North Island. Following a repaint at Hutt Workshops, DJ3096 was transferred to Kawerau to work as a heavy shunter. In 2000, the locomotive was allocated to Whangārei, for use in Northland, including working the Dargaville Branch, and the Portland-Port Whangarei wood chips circuit. In 2008, the locomotive was sold to the Dunedin Railways by the national railway operator Toll Rail after 40 years of service.

== Preservation ==
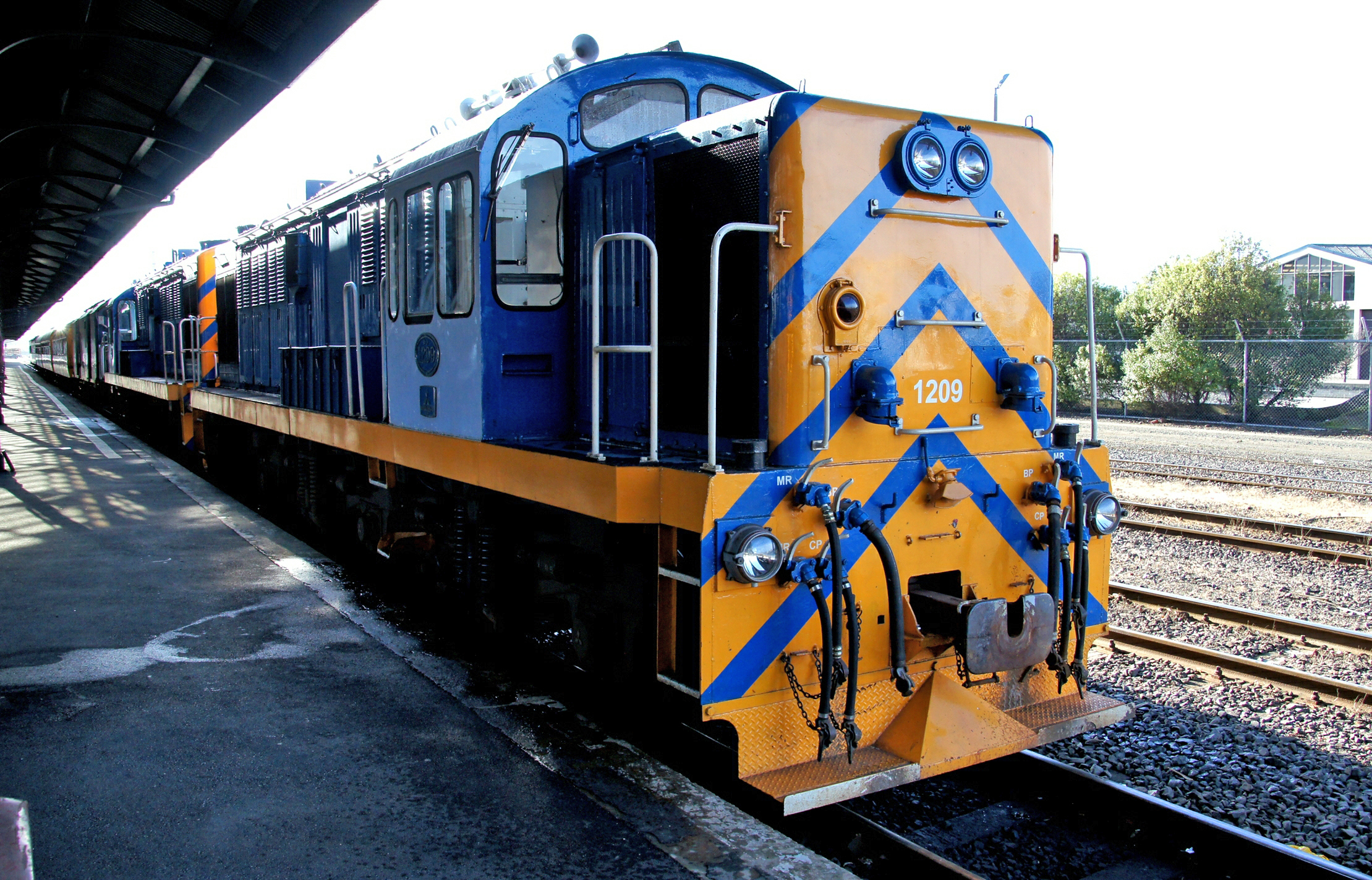
D^{J} 1209 at Dunedin Railway station, preserved by Dunedin Railways.

Eleven DJ class locomotives survived into preservation, with two being subsequently scrapped. Five were purchased by the then Taieri Gorge Railway (now Dunedin Railways) for use in tourist train service, while another four were purchased by Mainline Steam Heritage Trust. One unit each was kept by New Zealand Railways (later New Zealand Rail Limited) as heritage locomotives or made available as a display locomotive.

- Taieri Gorge Railway (now Dunedin Railways) purchased five DJ class locomotives in 1992 from New Zealand Rail Limited in order to operate their trains to Pukerangi and Middlemarch. DJs 3107, 3211, 3228, 3286, and 3424 (D^{J}s 1210, 1221, 1222, 1227, and 1240) were purchased in operational condition and are used to haul both the Taieri Gorge Limited and Seasider trips from Dunedin to Pukerangi or Middlemarch and Palmerston respectively. All carry a modified blue scheme with two exceptions; DJ3424 was repainted in NZR Carnation Red as D^{J} 1240 for the Dunedin Railway Station centenary in 2006, while DJ3286 was repainted in the "Southerner Blue" livery in 2010 as D^{J} 1227. D^{J} 1240 was repainted into the Southerner blue livery in 2006.
- DJ3096 was also sold to Dunedin Railways in 2008 after being withdrawn by Toll Rail, and was overhauled and repainted in the "Southerner Blue" livery as D^{J} 1209, reentering service in 2009. Following a major engine fire in August 2010, the locomotive was again withdrawn from service and was overhauled again including the fitting of a new D398 engine block to replace the damaged original, before returning to service in 2011.
- Mainline Steam Heritage Trust purchased four DJs in 1990–91. DJs 3044 and 3580 (D^{J}s 1204 and 1254) were purchased as spare parts donors and were stored at MLST's Parnell depot, while DJ3292 and 3303 (D^{J}s 1228 and 1229) were purchased by Richard Head and Ian Welch respectively with the intention of having them returned to working order. With no intended use for the two Parnell locomotives, DJ3580 was scrapped in the 1990s; DJ3044 was removed from storage in May 2011 and was sold to Dunedin Railways after it was dismantled for spare parts.
- DJ3021 (D^{J} 1202) was withdrawn in April 1990 but was not scrapped. Instead, the locomotive's engine and electric equipment were removed and the locomotive was placed on static display at Ranfurly station on the former Otago Central Railway. It was later purchased by Dunedin Railways and road-hauled to storage in the Middlemarch goods shed, where it has been stored pending restoration. Despite missing the engine, electrical equipment, and other parts, 3021 is the last DJ in the former New Zealand Railways Corporation blue livery as applied to the class in the 1980s. DJ3021 now sits outside at Sutton, across from the station. It sits on wooden blocks next to three AO class passenger carriages, with all of the bogies sitting on temporary track sets and covered by tarpaulins. The DJ class locomotive and three carriages are surrounded by a vandal-proof fence, all stock has suffered from various amounts of graffiti.
