= New Zealand DE class locomotive =

New Zealand DE class
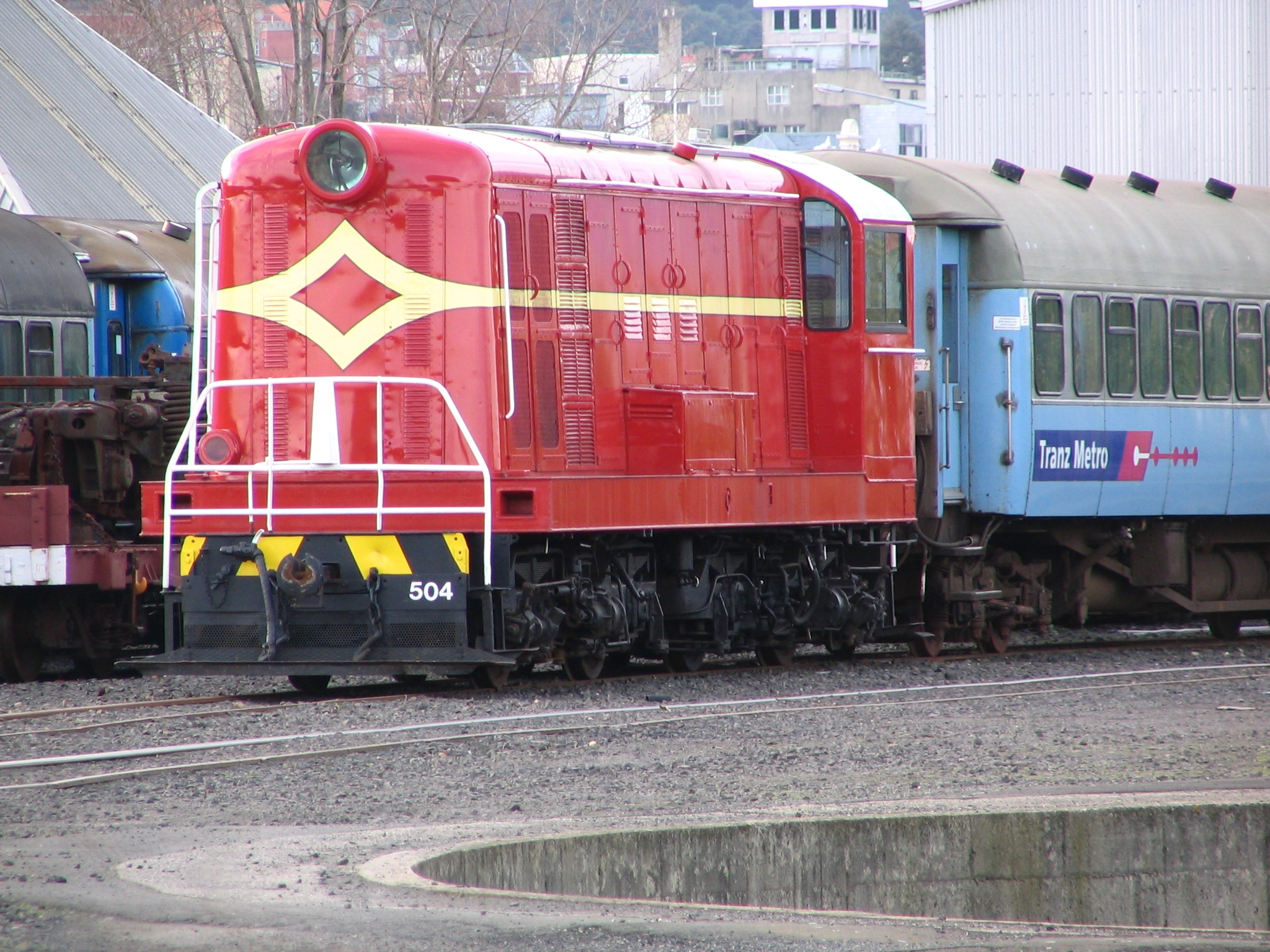
- D^{E} 504 in service for Taieri Gorge Railway, shunting at Dunedin.
Type and origin
- Power type: Diesel-electric
- Builder: English Electric, Preston, United Kingdom
- Build date: 1951–1952
Specifications
- Configuration
  - UIC: Bo-Bo
- Gauge: 3 ft 6 in (1,067 mm)
- Wheel diameter: 3 ft (0.914 m)
- Wheelbase: 24 ft 6 in (7.468 m) total, 8 ft (2.438 m) bogie
- Length: 38 ft 3 in (11.659 m) over couplers
- Width: 8 ft 5 in (2.565 m)
- Height: 11 ft 5 in (3.480 m)
- Axle load: 13 long tons (13.2 t; 14.6 short tons)
- Loco weight: 50.8 long tons (51.6 t; 56.9 short tons)
- Fuel type: Diesel
- Fuel capacity: 300 imp gal (360 US gal; 1,400 L)
- Prime mover: English Electric 6SRKT Mk I
- RPM range: 450 - 750 rpm
- Engine type: four stroke, two valves per cylinder
- Aspiration: turbocharged
- Traction motors: Four
- Cylinders: 6 Inline
- Cylinder size: 10 in × 12 in (254 mm × 305 mm)
- Loco brake: Air
- Train brakes: Air
Performance figures
- Maximum speed: 55 miles per hour (89 km/h)
- Power output: 660 hp (490 kW) gross, 600 hp (450 kW) net
- Tractive effort: 12,700 lbf (56.5 kN) at 15 mph (20 km/h)
Career
- Number in class: 15
- Numbers: 501–515 (original); 1308–1458 (TMS)
- First run: 20 May 1952 - 24 August 1953
- Last run: January 1989
- Retired: April 1984 – January 1989
- Disposition: 8 scrapped 7 preserved

The New Zealand DE class (Note: Following the introduction of the Traffic Monitoring System (TMS) in 1979, the class classification was capitalised, whereas previously the second letter was a smaller capital letter, that is D^{E}) was a class of fifteen diesel-electric shunting locomotives, introduced by the New Zealand Railways (NZR) with an intention to replace steam locomotives on shunting duties with diesel power. The class was physically similar to the Tasmanian Government Railways X class, which was also of English Electric design.

== In service ==
Although these locomotives were originally intended to be used as heavy transfer shunters, four of them were used in pairs, each crewed, on the Royal Train tour of Queen Elizabeth II during her visit to New Zealand in 1953-1954. The class also underwent trials for use in suburban passenger trains in Auckland and Wellington, as well as on lesser regional passenger services and branch line freight.

The class was also the first to run on the new Murupara Branch, initially for construction and later for log trains on the still unsettled track bed. This has given it the unofficial status of being the first mainline diesel-electric locomotive in the NZR service, although this title correctly belongs to another class, the D^{F} class of 1954, also manufactured by English Electric.

The introduction of the Traffic Monitoring System (TMS) in 1979 saw the locomotives being renumbered DE1308 – DE1458.

Initially, the class was based in the North Island, but in 1981, four of the locomotives were sent to the South Island. Over time, the class was gradually dispersed to secondary yards on the network, such as Napier, Dunedin, and Invercargill. In the early 1980s, two class members were fitted with English Electric 6SRKT Mk 2 engines, which were also used in the DG class locomotives.

== Withdrawal and Preservation ==
As part of the New Zealand Railways Corporation's plan to reduce the number of first-generation diesels in the late 1980s, a number of the class were scrapped or sold for preservation.

Out of the original 15 D^{E} class locomotives, seven have survived. All have operated in preservation at least once:

- D^{E} 504/DE1337 was sold to the Otago Polytechnic not long after being withdrawn. The plan was to use the locomotive's engine in a recreation of a ship's engine room, but this never materialised. In 1993, it became surplus to their requirements and was then gifted to the Otago Excursion Train Trust. The trust restored it to working order, and it was repainted in the TGRs Bahama Blue livery and given the identity as DE1337. In 2006, the locomotive was repainted to the original red livery with Larch Yellow nose stripes and wasp stripes on the headstocks as per the 1970s. D^{E} 504 is not mainline certified. It is used occasionally for pulling work trains and passenger excursions, but it's mostly seen shunting in Dunedin yard. Although it was put up for sale or leasing in mid-2015, the locomotive is still operational and can be seen being used for shunting around the depot occasionally.
- D^{E} 505/DE1343 was sold to the Silver Stream Railway (SSR) in 1984. It was one of two members of the class that did not receive the International Orange livery. Instead, it retained its original red livery with its headstocks painted yellow until it was withdrawn from service. It has since been restored and is currently in operation on the SSR, still sporting its original livery but with the headstocks repainted black.
- D^{E} 507/DE1372/GVR N^{O} 8 was sold to the Glenbrook Vintage Railway (GVR) in 1988. Since then, it has been repainted in its original livery and now bears both its original identity as D^{E} 507 and GVR N^{O} 8. In December 2025 the locomotive was stripped of several vital parts and copper wiring during a burglary, and subsequently has been written off as the damages and theft were deemed too high to economically repair.
- D^{E} 508/DE1839 was brought to Wellington after it was withdrawn and was restored by the New Zealand Rail (Tranz Rail from 1995) to become D^{E} 508 in their Heritage Fleet. During this time, it performed some shunting work at the Wellington carriage and wagon depot and also took part in some railfan trips. In 2003, Tranz Rail decided to disperse the Heritage Fleet, which led to the locomotive being given to the Railway Heritage Trust and moved to the Silver Stream Railway. The locomotive is still operational and runs on the Silver Stream Railway open days. In early 2014, a replica of its original cow-catcher was fitted.
- D^{E} 509/DE1395 was also sold to the Glenbrook Vintage Railway in 1988. It retained its TMS identity as DE1395 and its International Orange livery. However, it did not spend much time in service for its new owners and ended up in storage by 1990 without ever carrying its new identity as GVR N^{O} 9. This locomotive is the last surviving Royal Train D^{E}.
- D^{E} 511/DE1412 was sold in 1988 to the Diesel Traction Group. After being restored as D^{E} 511, it traveled with D^{G} 772 to Springfield on an excursion as part of the Rail 125 celebrations in the same year. Currently, this locomotive is undergoing repairs after being in storage.
- D^{E} 512/DE1429 was also sold to the Diesel Traction Group in 1988. It was restored as DE1429 and has been the only operational class member to wear the International Orange livery in preservation. The locomotive has occasionally been used at Ferrymead and has attended the famous Waipara Vintage Festivals hosted by the Weka Pass Railway (WPR) in the past. Since September 2015, it has been on a long-term loan to the Weka Pass Railway.
