= New Zealand DF class (1954) =

New Zealand D^{F} class (English Electric)
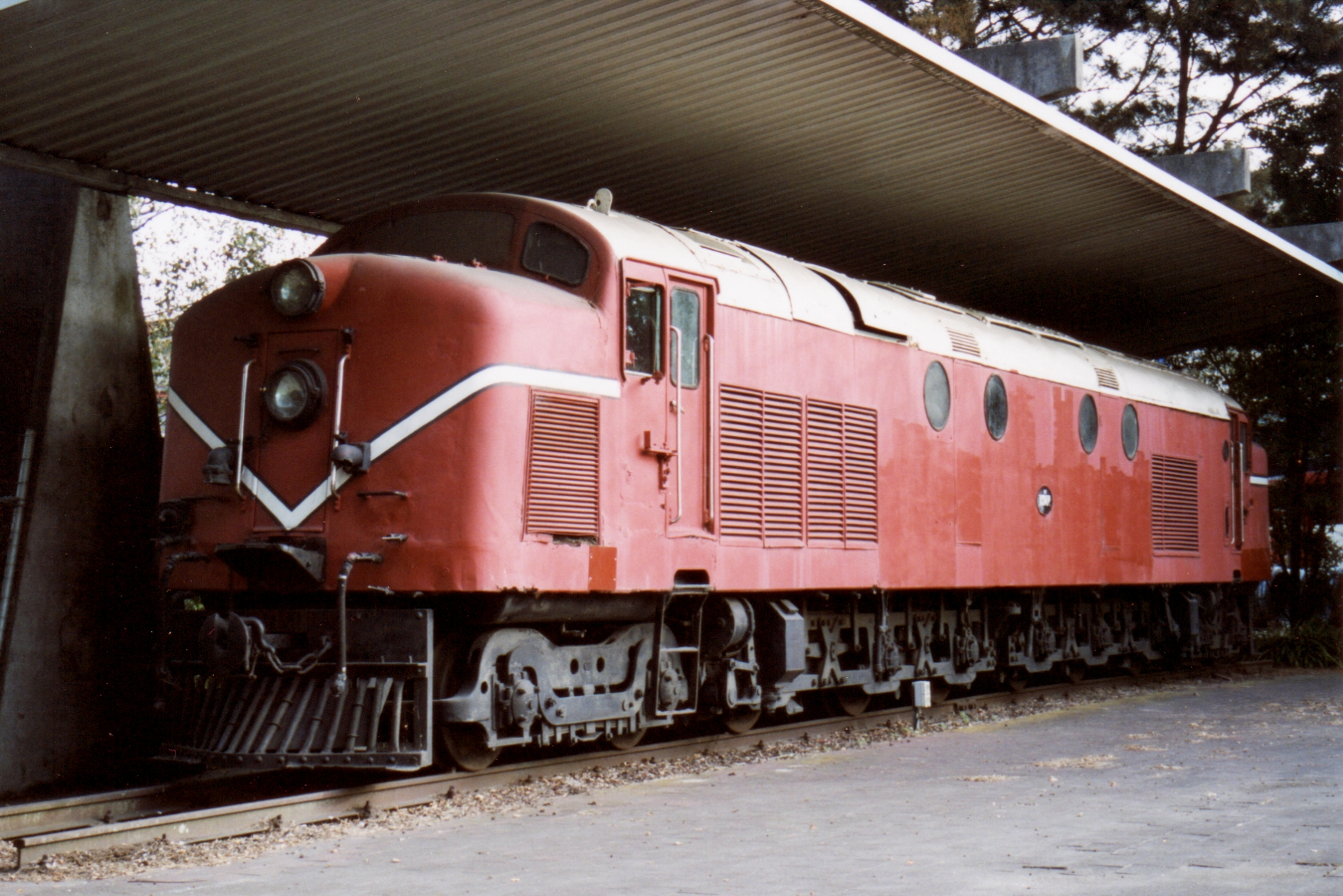
- English Electric D^{F} 1501 on display outside Sims-PMI in Otahuhu, Auckland. The locomotive has since moved to the Diesel Traction Group, Ferrymead Historic Park.
Type and origin
- Power type: Diesel-electric
- Builder: English Electric, United Kingdom
- Build date: 1954
Specifications
- Configuration
  - AAR: 2C-C2
  - UIC: (2′Co)(Co2′)
  - Commonwealth: 2Co-Co2
- Gauge: 3 ft 6 in (1,067 mm)
- Wheel diameter: 3 ft 1 in (0.940 m)
- Minimum curve: 297 ft (90.526 m)
- Wheelbase: 52 ft 0 in (15.850 m) total, 12 ft 0 in (3.658 m) rigid
- Length: 58 ft 0 in (17.678 m) over headstocks
- Width: 8 ft 4 in (2.540 m)
- Height: 11 ft 6 in (3.505 m)
- Axle load: 11 3/4 long tons (11.9 t; 13.2 short tons)
- Adhesive weight: 69 long tons (70 t)
- Loco weight: 105 long tons (107 t; 118 short tons)
- Fuel type: Diesel
- Fuel capacity: 600 imp gal (2,700 L)
- Prime mover: English Electric 12SVT Mk 2
- RPM range: 750 - 850 rpm
- Engine type: four stroke, four valves per cylinder
- Aspiration: Turbocharged
- Generator: English Electric 828A
- Traction motors: Six English Electric 525/2A
- Cylinders: 12 vee
- Cylinder size: 10 in × 12 in (254 mm × 305 mm)
- MU working: 110V, 10 notch electro-magnetic control
- Loco brake: air, dynamic
- Train brakes: air
Performance figures
- Maximum speed: 60 mph (97 km/h)
- Power output: 1,500 hp (1,100 kW) gross, 1,370 hp (1,020 kW) net
- Tractive effort: 38,500 lbf (171.3 kN) at 25% adhesion starting, 27,700 lbf (123.2 kN) at 16 mph (30 km/h) continuous
Career
- Number in class: 10
- Numbers: 1500 - 1509 (1954 to 1965); 1300 - 1309 (1965 to 1975)
- Locale: North Island
- First run: 1 July 1954
- Last run: 21 June 1975
- Disposition: 9 scrapped 1 preserved

The New Zealand D^{F} class locomotive of 1954 is the first class of mainline diesel-electric locomotives built for New Zealand's national railway network, built by English Electric.

== Introduction ==
They have a wheel arrangement of (2′Co)(Co2′) under the UIC classification system, generated 1120 kW (1500 hp) of power, and could achieve a maximum speed of 97 km/h. They started the process of displacing steam motive power from main lines in New Zealand, but were soon displaced themselves by the D^{A} class of 1955.

Initially, 31 D^{F} locomotives were ordered, but this order was amended to ten D^{F}s and 42 D^{G} class locomotives, which in appearance was essentially half a D^{F} but with a similar bulldog nose cab design. The D^{F} locomotives were heavier than the latter and slightly less powerful D^{A} class and were used to haul freight trains on the North Auckland and East Coast Main Trunk lines in Northland and the Bay of Plenty from which the D^{A} class were prohibited by dint of the higher axle loading of the D^{A} class. Their axle loading was 12.2 tonnes (12.0 long tons; 13.4 short tons).

== Operation ==
After initial trials, the locomotives began service on North Island Main Trunk (NIMT) freight services in October 1954. New timetables drastically reduced transit times, although mechanical issues soon became apparent, and the lack of availability of locomotives meant the reduced timetables could not be maintained. The locomotives had a number of defects that required substantial work, and the entirety of the class was withdrawn in 1955 so that their engines could be rebuilt.

While this work improved the locomotives' reliability, NZR cancelled the remainder of its order for more D^{F} class, and following contractual negotiations with English Electric, amended its order to purchase the DG class locomotives instead. Maintenance costs and faults continued to plague the class. Between 1955 and 1961, the maintenance costs of a D^{F} locomotive per mile were three times that of a D^{A} class locomotive.

By the 1960s, the entire class was allocated to Frankton (Hamilton) and was often in use on the lightly-laid section of track between Tauranga and Paeroa. Continued reliability problems meant that the D^{F} class often ran in pairs or along with a D^{I} class or D^{B} class locomotive. By 1971, a number of the class were laid up.

The D^{F} class were confined to the North Island, although they did all visit Dunedin for overhaul at Hillside Workshops. The locomotives did not run in service during their journeys to and from Hillside; instead, they were towed. They were allowed to move under their own power once there and haul transfer freight trains to and from Port Chalmers and Mosgiel as part of tests before returning to service.

On the arrival of the Phase III D^{A} class locomotives in 1964, the D^{F} class was renumbered from the 1500 series to the 1300 series in November 1965, in order to free up the 1500-series numbers for the new D^{A} class locomotives.

== Withdrawal ==
The D^{F}s were unreliable and needed frequent repairs. This contributed to their short lifespan; withdrawal began in 1972 and the last, D^{F} 1301, was withdrawn in June 1975. A plan to shift the whole fleet to the South Island to join the smaller but more versatile English Electric D^{G} class was proposed. They were to operate on the hilly Dunedin to Oamaru section of the Main South Line, but instead, a new locomotive type was introduced from 1968: the D^{J} class.

== Preservation ==
D^{F} 1301, the first locomotive built, was donated to the National Federation of Rail Societies of New Zealand (now Federation of Rail Organisations of New Zealand, or FRONZ) in 1975. It was placed on static display at Sim Pacific Metals Limited in Auckland in August 1976, replacing K 900. As part of this, it was renumbered to its original number of 1501, but with V-shaped nose stripes in place of the original wing-shaped ones. Initially displayed in the open, a limited shelter was built over the locomotive at a later date, although this did not halt the progressive deterioration of the locomotive. Various proposals were put forward for the restoration of the locomotive, but they did not amount to anything.

In 2007, with Sims Pacific requiring the area where the D^{F} was located for redevelopment, FRONZ concluded an agreement with the Diesel Traction Group (DTG) in Christchurch to have the locomotive moved to their premises for restoration. The first stage of this relocation took place in August 2008 when 1501 was re-railed and then was towed to Westfield Depot for assessment. In January 2009, members of the Group accompanied the locomotive on a three-day 1,100 km trip to Christchurch, from where it moved to their Ferrymead Railway base a few days later.

Following the completion of D^{I} 1102 in late 2018, 1501 is currently undergoing a restoration to mainline condition by the members of the DTG.
