= Federation of Rail Organisations of New Zealand =

- President: Grant Craig
- Founded: 30 June 1977; 47 years ago
- Headquarters: New Zealand

Website
- FRONZ

The Federation of Rail Organisations of New Zealand Incorporated (known by its acronym FRONZ) represents the interests of the heritage and tourist rail industry in New Zealand.

== Membership ==
The organisation's 70 members, range from commercial full-time operators such as Dunedin Railways and Christchurch Tramway to small, volunteer only, organisations such as those preserving individual railway stations or historic sites.

== History ==
The group was founded as the National Federation of Rail Societies Incorporated on 30 June 1977. The group changed its name in 2002 to the Federation of Rail Organisations of New Zealand, and is known by its acronym FRONZ.

In 2007, FRONZ purchased the last remaining English Electric D^{F} class locomotive, 1501, and concluded an agreement with the Diesel Traction Group to have the locomotive moved to their premises for restoration.

== Activities ==
FRONZ makes regular submissions to the Parliament on rail-related legislation and regulations, and is a regular commentator on rail-related issues and events.

FRONZ holds an annual conference for all its members.

== Officers ==
The current officers of the group are:

- President: Grant Craig
- Secretary: Jeff Tolan
- Treasurer: Bruce Shalders
- Executive members: Courtney Kilner Guy Wellwood David Macaulitis
- Executive Officer: Margaret Gordon

== See also ==
- Railway preservation in New Zealand
