= New Zealand DF class locomotive (1979) =

Class of 30 diesel-electric locomotives

New Zealand DF / DFT class (General Motors)
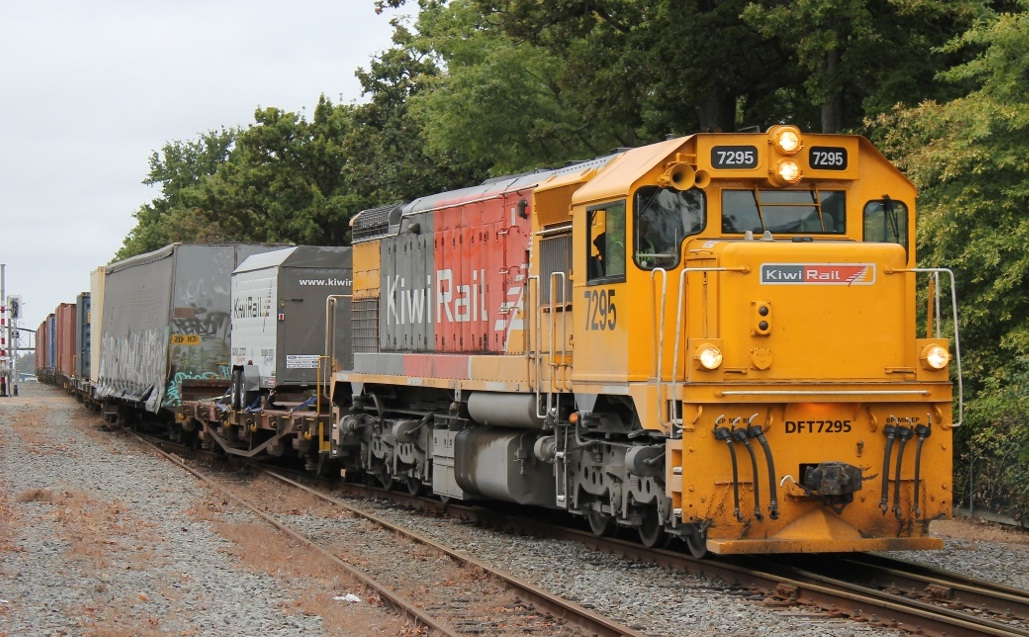
- DFT7295 departing the Ashburton yard, 20 February 2013. Note the enlarged driver's side windscreen.
Type and origin
- Power type: Diesel-electric
- Builder: General Motors Diesel (GMD), Canada
- Model: DF EMD GL22MC; DFT EMD GT22MC
- Build date: 1979 - 1981
- Rebuilder: Tranz Rail (Hutt Workshops)
- Rebuild date: 1992 - 1997
- Number rebuilt: 30 (rebuilt as the DFT class)
Specifications
- Configuration
  - UIC: Co′Co′
  - Commonwealth: Co-Co
- Gauge: 3 ft 6 in (1,067 mm)
- Length: 16.7 metres (54 ft 9 in)
- Adhesive weight: 86.4 tonnes (85.0 long tons; 95.2 short tons) (DF); 87.6 tonnes (86.2 long tons; 96.6 short tons) (DFT)
- Loco weight: 86.4 tonnes (85.0 long tons; 95.2 short tons) (DF); 87.6 tonnes (86.2 long tons; 96.6 short tons) (DFT)
- Prime mover: GM 12-645E (DF); GM 12-645E3C (DFT)
- RPM range: 900 rpm
- Engine type: V12 Diesel engine
- Aspiration: Roots-type supercharger (DF); Turbocharger (DFT)
- Displacement: 126.84 litres (7,740 cu in)
- Generator: AR6-D14
- Traction motors: Six D29CCT
- Cylinders: 12
- Cylinder size: 230 mm × 254 mm (9.1 in × 10.0 in)
Performance figures
- Maximum speed: 113 km/h (70 mph)
- Power output: 1,230 kW (1,650 hp) DF; 1,800 kW (2,400 hp) DFT
- Tractive effort: 198 kN (45,000 lb_{f})
Career
- Number in class: 30 (20 DFBs and 10 DFTs)
- Numbers: 1651 - 1670 (Note: Ten locomotives never received road numbers, as they began service after the introduction of Traffic Monitoring System in 1979) (original DF); 6006 - 6317 (TMS DF); 7008 - 7348 (DFT)
- Locale: All of New Zealand
- First run: July 1979 - February 1981
- Disposition: 22 in service 3 stored 1 scrapped 4 sold (South Africa)

The New Zealand DF class locomotive of 1979 is a class of 30 Co-Co diesel-electric locomotives built by General Motors Diesel of Canada between 1979 and 1981. Between 1992 and 1997, all the locomotives were rebuilt as the DFT class, a turbocharged version of the DF.

The class should not be confused with the English Electric NZR D^{F} class of 1954; as all of the old D^{F} locomotives had been retired by mid-1975, the "DF" classification was free to be re-used.

== Introduction ==
In November 1977, New Zealand Railways placed an order for the new locomotives.

The DFs were powered by an EMD 12-645 engine, the same prime mover chosen for the DC class, but were able to make greater use of that power by having six traction motors and Co-Co arrangement as opposed to the four traction motors and A1A-A1A wheel arrangement of the DCs. This gave the DF several advantages: a tractive effort of 198 kN (45,000 lb_{f}) and a maximum speed of 113 km/h (70 mph), compared to the DCs 140 kN (31,000 lb_{f}) and 90–100 km/h (56–62 mph). The most noticeable visual difference between the DF and the DC is that the DF is considerably longer, with the headlight arrangement on the cabs differing: the DC has the lights arranged horizontally, while the DF has them arranged vertically.

=== Classification ===
The DF class reused an earlier classification for an English Electric supplied locomotive, the original D^{F} class. It was common practice during the steam era for NZR to re-use classifications where the original locomotive so classified was withdrawn. With the diesel area, NZR also classified classes of locomotives from the same manufacturer together for compatibility reasons, the new DF class were able to work in multiple with the English Electric D^{G} class locomotives and the D^{I} class locomotives.

== In service ==
=== History ===
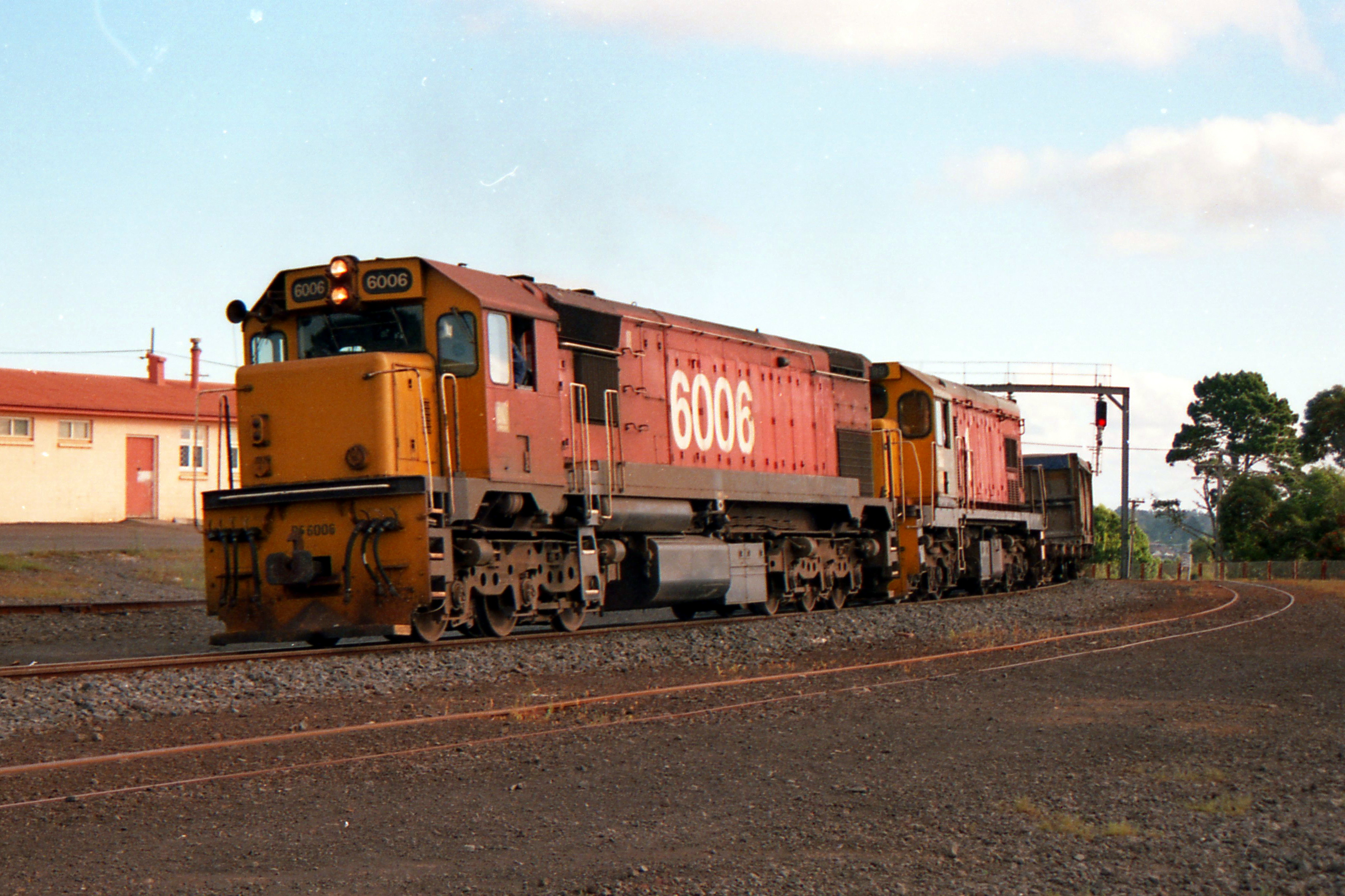
DF6006 and DB1199 at Avondale. The locomotive's two small front windscreens have been modified to a large single windscreen.

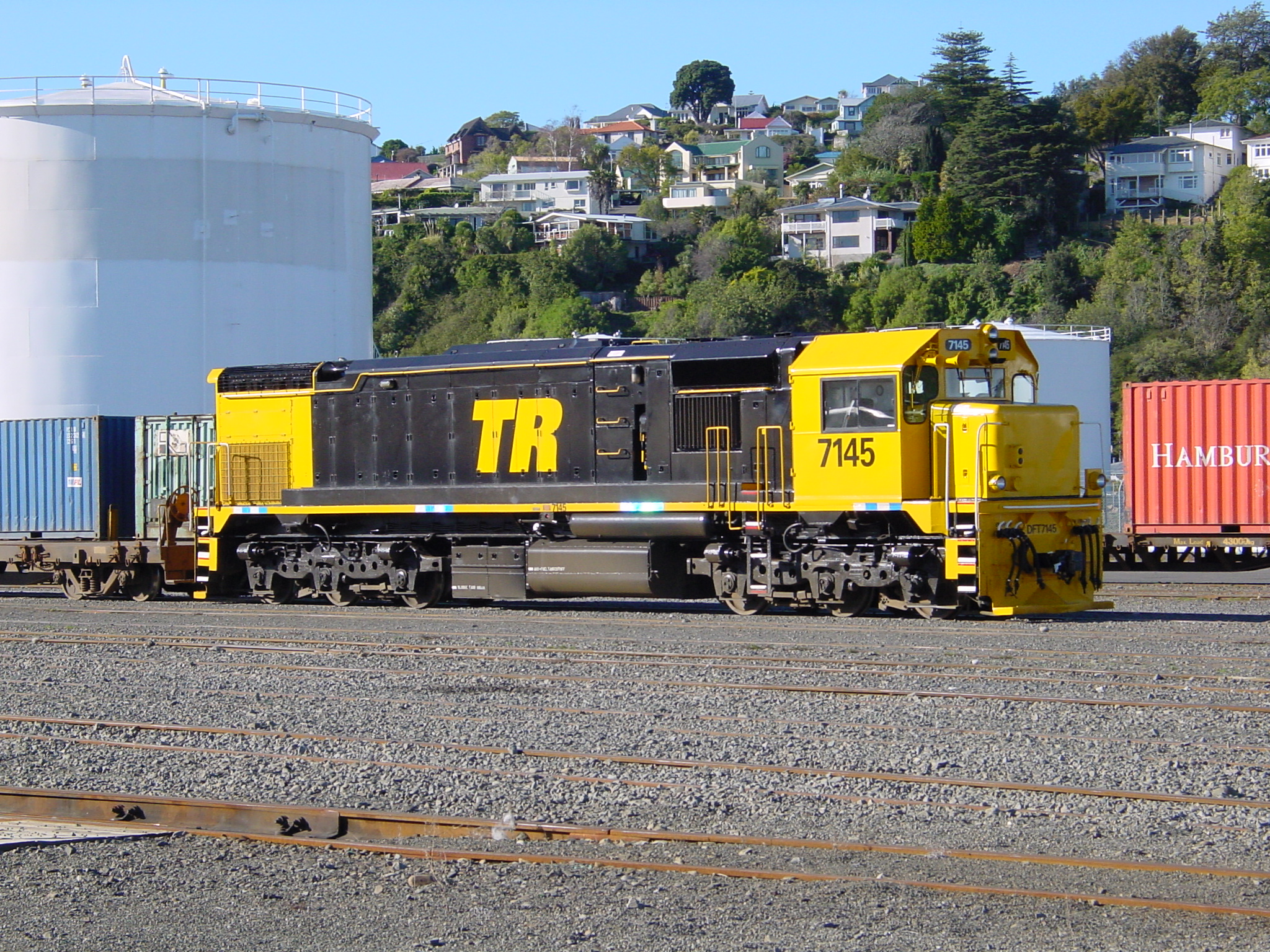
DFT7145 in former Tranz Rail "Bumble Bee" livery in Ahuriri Yard, Napier, 8 June 2003

The first 20 members of the DF class arrived in New Zealand in July 1979, and initially, ten worked on the East Coast Main Trunk, Kinleith, Rotorua and Murupara Branches, making use of the recently opened Kaimai Tunnel; and ten worked freight trains on the Main North Line between Christchurch and Picton. At the time, they were the most powerful locomotives in the South Island, with a total power output of 1,230 kilowatts (1,650 hp).

The next ten DFs arrived in February 1981 and were also sent to work in the Bay of Plenty, and some to supplement the South Island fleet, which by this time had also entered service on the Main South Line and Midland Line as far as Arthur's Pass.

In 1986, the DF fleet was reallocated, concentrating 22 of the class in the South Island, and reallocating the remaining eight North Island DFs from Hamilton to Wellington, for use between Wellington and Gisborne, on the Wairarapa Line and Palmerston North - Gisborne Line (PNGL).

In 1988, the fleet was again reallocated due to the opening of the North Island Main Trunk electrification, with 20 DFs based in Auckland for use in Northland, and between Auckland, Hamilton and the ECMT and its branches. The remaining 10 locomotives were based in Christchurch. This removed the DFs from the lower North Island routes and reduced the number in the South Island.

=== Rebuilding ===
The main downside to the DF was the lack of power output from the diesel engine. This hindered the DF when it came to hauling heavy freight trains. While the locomotives had a comparable tractive effort to the DX class, they had little more than half the power of a DX.

In November 1992, DF6260 was rebuilt with a new turbocharged diesel engine and some other minor alterations. The rebuilt DF was reclassified DFT (the T standing for turbocharged) and renumbered 7008. DFT7008 was released from Hutt Workshops on 20 November 1992 and used on a number of revenue and test trains before being relocated to the South Island on 1 December 1992.

After 18 months of trial, the decision was made to convert the remaining 29 DFs to DFTs, with the last locomotive converted in February 1997. The turbocharged locomotives can now generate 1,800 kW (2,400 hp), and now comfortably fit between the DC class and the DX class in terms of power output.

=== Auckland Transport service ===
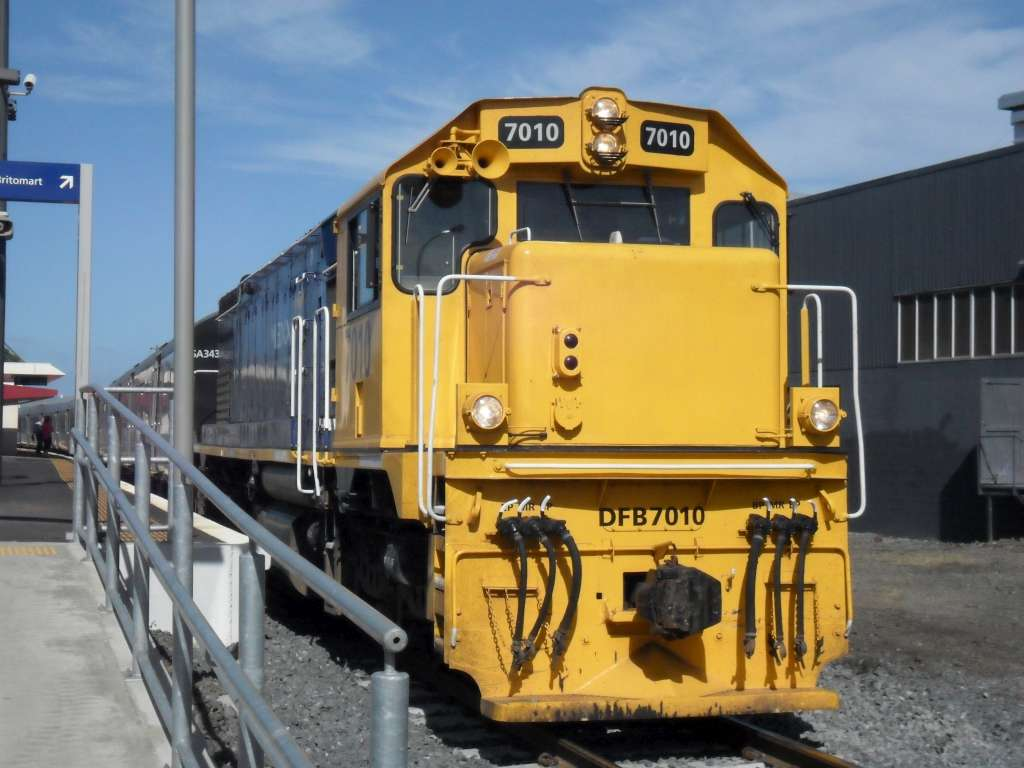
DFB7010 at Morningside station with a 6-car SA set, 10 February 2011

Three DFTs/DFBs were in service in Auckland hauling six-car SA (ex-British Rail Mark 2 carriages rebuilt for Auckland suburban services) trains on the Auckland suburban network, leased by Auckland Transport. Most were in four- or five-car configurations with a DC class locomotive. The locomotives used on 6-car SA sets were DFBs 7010, 7200 and 7348, and DFT7104. These began service on 20 September 2010 with the introduction of a new timetable. DFB7010 was released back to KiwiRail in November 2012, leaving three locomotives operating. Other DFTs have been assigned periodically to cover for when these locomotives undergo maintenance, with DFT7051 and DFB7186 most recently filling this role during the 2011 Rugby World Cup when extra six-car trains were in use.

=== Current ===
The class remains predominantly employed on general freight duties on all routes nationwide, with the general exception of through trains on the NIMT and the Midland Line coal workings. The locomotives operate both in multiple with the other mainline locomotive classes or as single locomotives, depending on availability and the level of motive power required.

==== Commuter and passenger services ====
Since July 2015, up to five DFB locomotives have been the main motive power on the Wairarapa Connection passenger service and Masterton to Wellington freight services, replacing six DC class locomotives used for the service since mid-2014.

Since October 2016, DFBs that are fitted with a fire suppression system, have been assigned to all the North Island KiwiRail Scenic Journeys passenger services, and are occasionally used on the Coastal Pacific in the South Island. The locomotives used on passenger services were required to be fitted with fire suppression equipment by the Pike River Mine disaster enquiry.

In July 2016, Transdev Wellington took over the operation of the Wairarapa Connection service, with KiwiRail still providing and operating the DFB locomotives on a "hook-and-tow" basis.

Three DFB locomotives (two operating and one spare) are to be used by the Te Huia (Hamilton to Auckland) from 2020.

=== Numbering ===
In common with NZR practice at the time, the class was numbered with reference to the power output (1,650 hp), with the first 20 locomotives numbered 1651 to 1670. With the introduction of the Traffic Monitoring System (TMS) in 1979, these locomotives were renumbered in order with new four-digit numbers starting with 6 in which the last number acted as a check number; DF 1651 became DF6006 and DF 1670 became DF6202. The second batch all received TMS numbers while under construction. They were then renumbered again when rebuilt to DFT standard in the 7xxx series, with these numbers allocated as they were rebuilt with no reference to their previous number.

=== Vision upgrades ===
Prior to the rebuilding to DFT standard, the locomotives received an upgrade in the late 1980s with the introduction of single-manning to improve visibility for the driver; this involved a large single front window replacing the original configuration that had two small windows instead.

In the late 1990s, the driver's side front window was enlarged to prevent eye and back problems for drivers focusing on the mainline ahead. The pillar separating the driver's window and the central window created a potentially dangerous blind spot and caused a distraction for drivers as their vision had to adjust to focus, or alternatively, adopt unnatural sitting positions. Drivers started to notice left-eye fatigue and back issues after long shifts or extended periods driving the locomotives. The pillar was moved 100mm to the left with the top and bottom sills raised and lowered at the same time to give drivers a better view of the track immediately in front and below. Fewer issues have been reported since.

=== Livery ===
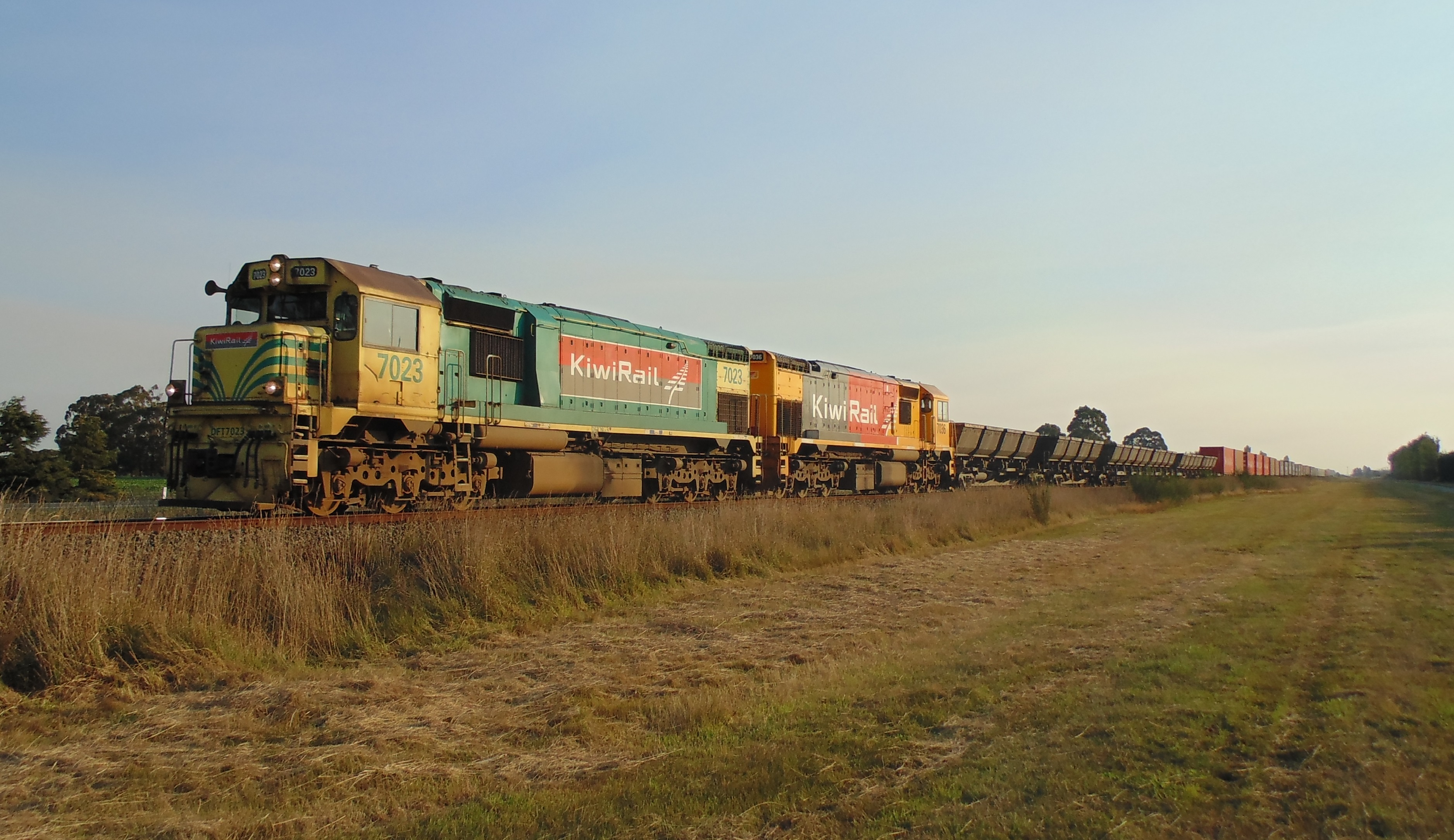
DFTs 7023 and 7036 approaching with a freight train approaching Tinwald, 12 March 2014

Since the DFs were introduced in the International Orange or "Fruit Salad" livery – orange long-hood, grey cab, and yellow ends with large white numbers on the long hood, which was the standard livery for NZ Railways until the late 1980s, they have been repainted in several liveries since:

- International Orange (Fruit Salad) - The livery as introduced. All wore this livery until being converted to DFTs, with 6064 being the last to wear the livery until 1997.
- Flying Tomato (same as the fruit salad livery, but without the grey cab) - which DFs 6006, 6012, 6029 and 6058 wore from the late 1980s to the early 1990s, when they were repainted back in the fruit salad livery.
- NZ Rail Blue - The orange was replaced by a mid-blue and with the "New Zealand Rail" logo on the long hood with numbers painted on the cab sides. The first several DFTs that were converted were repainted in the livery, but it was replaced with the Cato Blue livery when NZ Rail was replaced by Tranz Rail in 1995 and the class were being repainted in the Cato Blue livery. Some locomotives received Cato Blue sticker patches over the long hood lettering with the Tranz Rail logo attached.
- Cato Blue - A variation of NZ Rail Blue upon the launch of "Tranz Rail" in October 1995, where a sky-blue colour (Cato Blue) replaced the mid-blue and the Tranz Rail "winged" logo was placed on the long hood.
- Bumble Bee - The livery consisted of the long hood being black, with the hood end, short hood and cab painted yellow. The first two DFTs repainted wore the Tranz Rail winged logo on the long hood. Later locomotives instead had block "TR" letters in yellow on the long hood.
- MAXX Blue - A variation of Bumble Bee with dark blue on the long hood (with MAXX logo displayed), although with black long hood top and without the extended yellow rear area on the long hood. 7010, 7104, 7200 and 7348 were the only locomotives to wear the livery.
- Toll Green (Corncob) - A variation of Bumble Bee where Toll Green was substituted for the black, a lemon yellow replaced the former yellow colour used and the Toll Logo displayed on the long hood in addition to Toll logos on each end of the loco with three green whisker stripes. Later after Toll sold their stake in the railways in 2008, KiwiRail patch stickers were placed over the Toll logos.
- KiwiRail Phase 1 - The first introduced KiwiRail livery, with DFT7008 being the only example to receive it.
- KiwiRail Phase 2- The revised livery, which is now the most common livery on the class.

In addition, DF 6133 was one of two locomotives to wear the Tasman Forestry livery, with brown long-hood and cab with yellow ends.

== Ownership ==
In December 1996, Tranz Rail sold the DFT class to the General American Transportation Corporation (GATX, an American locomotive and rolling stock leasing company) for $131.5 million. It then leased the locomotives back for a period of 12 years. The lease ended on 19 December 2008 with ownership of the locomotives going to Tranz Rail's successor, KiwiRail, which paid a further $36.6m to buy the locomotives back.

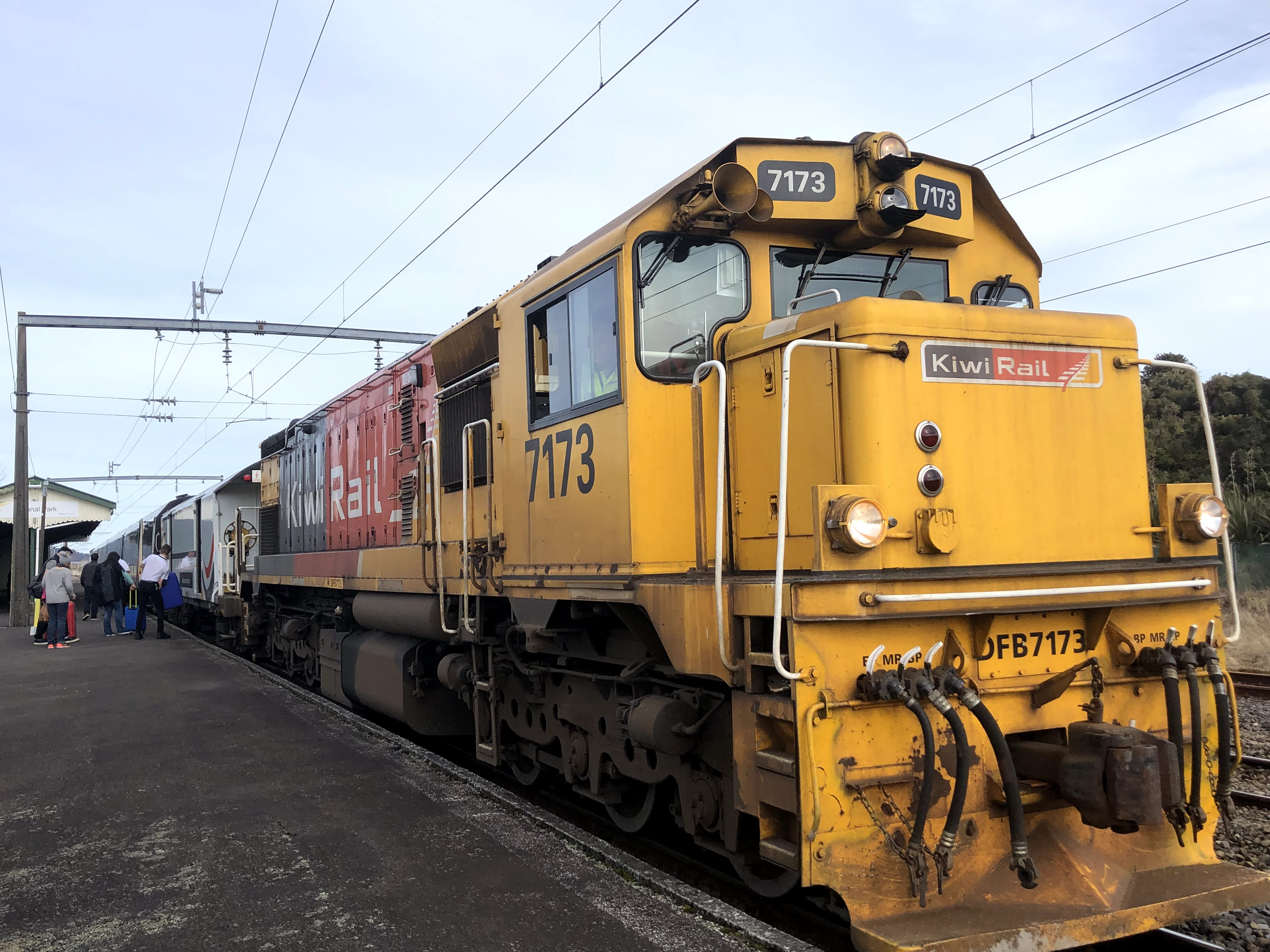
DFT7173 hauling the Northern Explorer at National Park station, 28 July 2019

== Sub-classes ==
In the early 2000s, a number of DFTs were fitted with the Maxitrax wheelslip control and received an internal sub-classification of DFM. This was used in the Amicus computer system only, and the classification was initially not applied to the locomotives themselves which remained identified as DFT. Although Maxitrax has since been removed from these locomotives, some of the locomotives that were classed as DFM have had the designation applied to them when repainted into the KiwiRail livery.

Between 2006/07, Toll Rail installed the Brightstar engine management system into twelve DFT class locomotives, with these locomotives then officially reclassified as DFB. In June 2016, KiwiRail re-introduced the programme for a number of both serviceable and unserviceable locomotives.

== Withdrawals ==
DFT7117 was withdrawn after hitting a slip south of Kaikōura on 20 June 2011. The locomotive suffered significant damage, and was towed to Hutt Workshops where it was placed into storage. The locomotive was stripped of many parts, including its prime mover and bogies.

In 2013, it was announced that the other 17 remaining DFTs would be withdrawn after the second batch of DL class locomotives were commissioned into service, owing to the decision to refurbish only the 12 DFB locomotives. With the second batch of 20 DLs being in service, only 10 locomotives (including 7117) were officially withdrawn.

As of August 2022, of all but two of the withdrawn locomotives were returned to service after undergoing rebuilding to DFBs - 7104 was reinstated as a DFT after receiving repairs, while the other, 7117, was scrapped in May 2021 at Hutt Workshops.

Since then, seven more DFTs had been withdrawn. DFT7092 was sent to Hutt Workshops for major overhaul in early-2021 for rebuilding into a DFB. Work had commenced on rebuilding the locomotive, but in mid-2022 work was put on hold due to financial constraints. As of mid-2024, the locomotive remains stored in a partially rebuilt state, awaiting future funding.

In August 2023, four DFTs were put up for tender via Manheim Auctions. DFTs 7008, 7036, 7051 and 7132 were exported to southern Africa in April 2024.

In September 2024, DFT7104 was once again withdrawn from service, with DFT7226 being withdrawn two months later.

== Accidents ==
A number of DF class locomotives have been involved in derailments and level-crossing accidents that have required repair. The most significant incident involving a DF locomotive was a head-on collision between DFT7254 and DC4202 and DX5448 at Waipahi in Otago on 20 October 1999, in which the driver of the DFT was killed and the locomotive suffered considerable frontal damage. It was trucked to Hillside Workshops for storage for a short period of time, when it was towed to Hutt Workshops for repairs. In early 2001, work started to repair the locomotive, which included straightening its under-frame and constructing a replacement cab. It was planned to construct a universal cab for the locomotive (the design the same as the cab which was originally fitted to DXR8007), but never eventuated. The loco was then placed into storage again until early to mid-2006 when work restarted on the loco. The locomotive was fully rebuilt and returned to service in December 2006 and renumbered as DFB7348.

== In popular culture ==
- DF 6133 (later DFB7307) featured in the 1981 film Goodbye Pork Pie.

== See also ==
- List of GMD Locomotives
