= Locomotives of New Zealand =

Self-propelled rail vehicles in New Zealand

Locomotives of New Zealand is a complete list of all locomotive classes that operate or have operated in New Zealand's railway network. It does not include locomotives used on bush tramways.

All New Zealand's main-line locomotives run on a narrow gauge of 3 ft 6 in (1,067 mm).

== Early locomotives ==
The first locomotive in New Zealand was built by Slaughter & Co in Bristol, arrived at Ferrymead in May 1863 to work on Canterbury Provincial Railways' 5 ft 3 in gauge. It was withdrawn in 1876. Lady Barkly, in use on Invercargill's jetty in August 1863 during construction of the Bluff branch, was another early example of a steam locomotive operating in New Zealand.

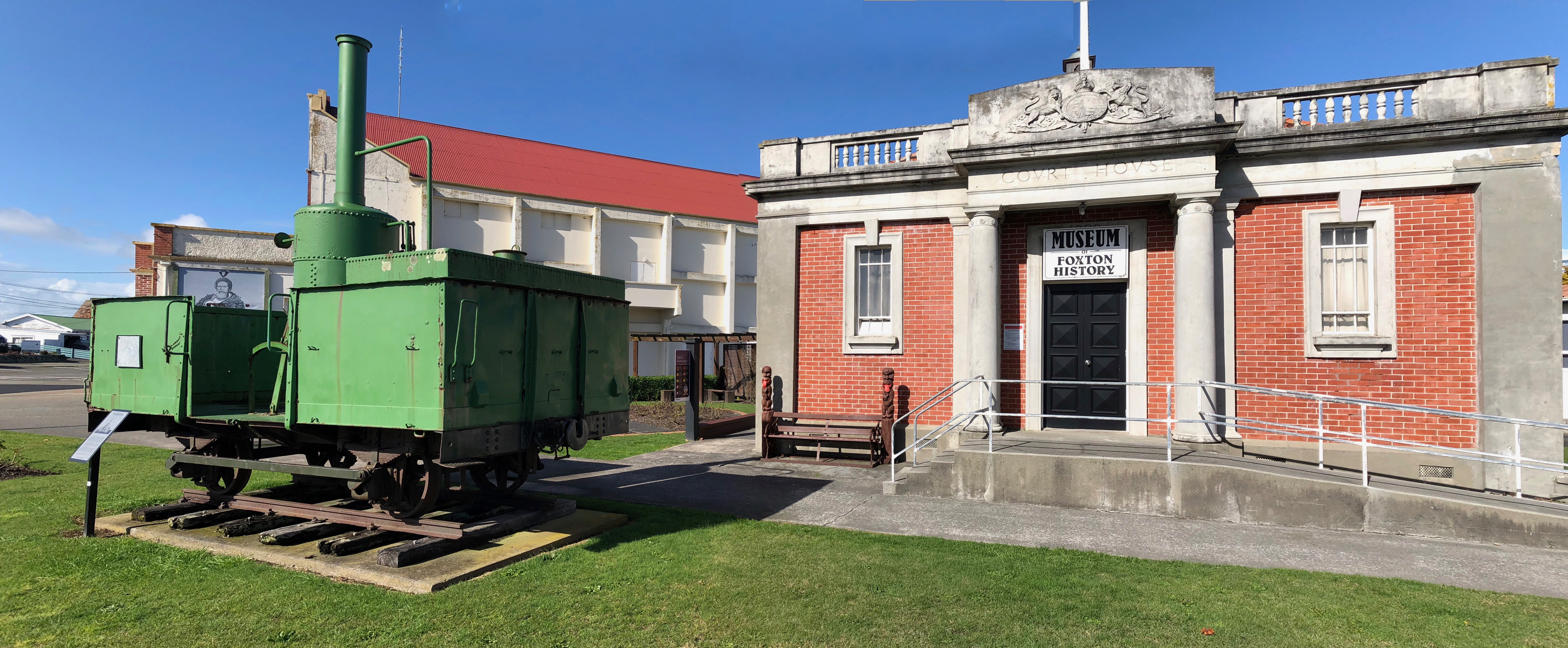
1994 replica of 1872 Palmerston locomotive was built on a 1931 La-6 truck and is outside Foxton's Court House Museum, as seen in 2018

The first steam engines built in New Zealand were produced in 1872. Fraser and Tinne built an 0-4-0 in Auckland in 1872, but it was based on a Hornsby traction engine. Similarly, a steam crane was converted during construction of the Port Chalmers railway, though it could only haul about 10 tons. The first locomotive entirely built in the country was a 10 hp (7.5 kW) engine for the Foxton Tramway contractor, Ashworth Crawshaw, by R. S. Sparrow & Co in Dunedin, also in 1872. It was named Palmerston. Horses had replaced Palmerston by 1874, but, in 1875, after iron had replaced wooden rails, the same branch had an A class steam locomotive built in Wellington by E.W. Mills' Lion Foundry.

== Classification details ==
Steam locomotives were originally categorised with just a single letter, such as the "F class". When a new class was built as an enhancement of an old class, the old class's letter was re-used, followed by a superscript upper-case letter. For example, the 1906 A class was followed by the A^{A} and A^{B} classes.

Diesel-electric and electric locomotive classifications originally consisted of an upper-case D or E respectively followed by a second and sometimes a third (sub-class) letter. The second and third letters are sometimes represented as smaller-sized upper case (for example, as seen on many locomotive cab-side number plates).

New classes were not always given the classification that alphabetically followed that of the previous class that had most recently been acquired. For example, the DJ class was followed by the DX class followed by the DF class. If an entire class had been withdrawn from service and the classification no longer in use, it was sometimes re-used; for example, two A classes exist, one from 1873 and one from 1906.

=== Traffic Monitoring System ===
Following the introduction of the computer-based Traffic Monitoring System (TMS) and consequent renumbering, classes were identified by the two upper-case letters with the first letter remaining D or E respectively and sub-classes being indicated by a third upper-case letter, such as DAA (DA modified for hump shunting), DAR (DA with rebuilt superstructure), DFT (DF with turbo-conversion), DXR (rebuilt DX) and so on. Most diesel shunting locomotives have a three-letter classification with DS as the first two letters, following on from the original diesel-hydraulic shunting class that was known simply as the DS class.

For electric locomotives the second letter generally referred to where the locomotive was based, such as EC in Christchurch, EO in Otira and EW in Wellington. The EM class in Wellington stands for Electric Motor and the ET stands for Electric Trailer. The DM class units were an exception to this.

Most railcars were classified RM (Rail Motor), and individual classes were known by alternate names such as the Vulcan railcars of the South Island and the Wairarapa railcars that ran over the Rimutaka Incline.

== List of locomotive classes ==
=== Mainline diesel locomotives ===
Image	Class		Numbers		Number in class	Year(s) introduced	Year(s) withdrawn	Power output	Notes
Image	TMS (1979)	pre-1979	TMS (1979)	pre-1979	Number in class	Year(s) introduced	Year(s) withdrawn	Power output	Notes
	DA	D^{A}	86–996	1400 – 1545	146	1955–1967	1974 – 1989	1,060 kW (1,420 hp)	The largest locomotive number class in New Zealand, 85 were rebuilt as the DC class, five as DAA class and one as DAR class.
	DB	D^{B}	1001–1180	1000 – 1016	17	1965–1966	1980 – 1989	705 kW (945 hp)	Ten were rebuilt as the DBR class.
	DBR		1199–1295		10	1980–1982	2002 – 2017	705 kW (945 hp)	Rebuilt DB with a new cab, lower hood and new engine.
	DC	D^{C}	4006–4951	1551 – 1599	85	1978–1983	1992 – present	1,100 kW (1,500 hp) 1,230 kW (1,650 hp)	Rebuilt DA with a new cab and low hood and appears in two engine types, one with 12-645C engines and the other with 12-645E engines.
	DCP		4277–4945		17	2002–2009	2015–present	1,230 kW (1,650 hp)	DC subclass originally built for passenger services, but now used for other uses.
		D^{F} (1954)		1500 – 1510 (1954); 1300 – 1309 (1960)	10	1954	1972–1975	1,120 kW (1,500 hp)	NZs first mainline diesel locomotive.
	DF	D^{F} (1979)	6006–6317	1651 – 1670	30	1979–1981	All rebuilt to DFTs	1,230 kW (1,650 hp)	
	DFB		7010–7348		21	2006–present	Still in use	1,800 kW (2,400 hp)	Upgraded DFT class locomotive ('B' for Brightstar)
	DFM		7036–7226		3		All reclassified as DFT internally	1,800 kW (2,400 hp)	Upgraded DFT class locomotive ('M' for Maxitrax).
	DFT		7008–7348		30	1992–1997	2011–present	1,800 kW (2,400 hp)	Rebuilt DF, with 21 later converted to DFBs ('T' for turbocharged).
	DG	D^{G}	2007–2468	750 – 791	42	1955–1956	1983	560 kW (750 hp)	11 were rebuilt from the 1956 DH class.
		D^{H} (1956)		766, 772, 777 – 783	11	1956	1968	560 kW (750 hp)	All were later reclassified as D^{G}s
	DI	D^{I}	1808–1843	1100 – 1104	5	1966	1988–1989	755 kW (1,012 hp)	
	DJ	D^{J}	3009–3689	1200 – 1263	64	1968–1969	1986 – 1991	672 kW (901 hp)	Five in service with Dunedin Railways
	DL		9008–9688		73	2010–2023	Still in use	2,700 kW (3,600 hp)	
	DM		8012-		66	2025		3,000 kW (4,000 hp)	Under order from Stadler Rail. Two arrived October 2024 for testing and commissioning. First unit entered service on 21 July 2025.
DQ	DQ		6007 -6036, 6324 – 6416		15	1996–1998	1998 – 2013	1,120 kW (1,500 hp)	Rebuilt QR class; originally from Queensland Railways.
	DX	D^{X}	5016–5520	2600 – 2648	48	1972–1975	All Rebuilt as DXC & DXB	2,050 kW (2,750 hp)	Two rebuilt as DXR.
	DXB		5016 – 5166, 5448		14		still in use	2,050 kW (2,750 hp)	Upgraded DX class ('B' for Brightstar).
	DXC		5172 – 5520 5039		32		still in use	2,050 kW (2,750 hp)	DX class upgraded for the Midland Line coal trains ('C' for chute).
	DXH				0		All rebuilt as DXB and DXC	2,050 and 2,400 kW (2,750 and 3,220 hp)	Upgraded from DX
	DXR		8007, 8022		2	1993, 2006	still in use	2,420 kW (3,250 hp)	Rebuilt From DX
	QR		2027 – 2102, 3032		25	1997	1999	1,120 kW (1,500 hp)	Originally from Queensland Railways; 15 rebuilt as the DQ class.

=== Diesel shunting locomotives ===
Image	Class		Numbers		Number in class	Year(s) introduced	Year(s) withdrawn	Power output	Notes
Image	TMS (1980)	pre-1980	TMS (1980)	pre-1980	Number in class	Year(s) introduced	Year(s) withdrawn	Power output	Notes
	DAA	D^{AA}	11–63	1400 – 1404, 1406	5	1971	1989	1,060 kW (1,420 hp)	DA class refitted for low speed running for heavy shunting at Te Rapa.
	DAR		517		1	1989	2008	1,060 kW (1,420 hp)	DA class modified for shunting at Tasman Pulp and Paper.
	DE	D^{E}	1308–1458	501 – 515	15	1952	1984–1989	490 kW (660 hp)	
	DH	D^{H}	2816–2868	900 – 905	6	1978	Still in use	672 kW (901 hp)	
	DS	D^{S}		200–215	16	1949–1955	1978–1984		
	DSA	D^{SA}				1953–1967			
	DSB	D^{SB}	1003–1290	300–327	28	1954–1967	1978–1988		
	DSC	D^{SC}	2000–2759	400 – 469	70	1959–1967	1989–present	315 kW (422 hp)	
	DSG		3005–3304		24	1981–1983	still in use	700 kW (940 hp)	Shunting locomotive.
	DSJ		4004–4060		5	1984–1985	still in use	350 kW (470 hp)	
	TR	T^{R}			90	1924–1978			Six distinct build models of various power, wheel set and body.
	EB		1809, 1815, 1821		3		1976–1980	23 kW (31 hp)	Used for internal workshop movements. Rebuilt in 1953 from the EB Battery-electric loco.

=== Electric locomotives ===
Image	Class		Numbers		Number in class	Year(s) introduced	Year(s) withdrawn	Voltage	Power output	Notes
Image	TMS (1980)	pre-1980	TMS (1980)	pre-1980	Number in class	Year(s) introduced	Year(s) withdrawn	Voltage	Power output	Notes
	EO	E^{A}	39–74	1 – 5	5	1968, 2008	1997, 2011	1500 V DC overhead	960 kW (1,290 hp)	Originally classified EA, 1980 reclassified as EO. Used Otira-Arthurs Pass section, three returned to Wellington suburban service in 2008. Final withdrawal 2011.
		E^{C}		7–12	6	1928–1929	1970	1500 V DC overhead	885 kW (1,187 hp)	Used on Christchurch-Lyttelton line.
	ED	E^{D}	15, 21	101–110	10	1938	1969–1981	1500 V DC overhead	670 kW (900 hp)	Used on Wellington suburban network.
	EF		30007–30249		22	1986–1988	1991–present	25 kV 50 Hz AC overhead	3,000 kW (4,000 hp)	Originally Class 30, reclassified as EF class. Used on the NIMT between Palmerston North and Hamilton.
		E^{O}		2–6	5	1923	1968	1500 V DC overhead	510 kW (680 hp)	Used on Otira-Arthurs Pass section. Replaced by EA class (later reclassified as EO).
	EW	E^{W}	107–171	1800 – 1806	7	1952	1988	1500 V DC overhead	1,340 kW (1,800 hp)	Used on Wellington suburban network.

=== Battery electric locomotives ===
Image	Class		Numbers		Number in class	Year(s) introduced	Year(s) withdrawn	Power output	Notes
Image	TMS (1980)	pre-1980	TMS (1980)	pre-1980	Number in class	Year(s) introduced	Year(s) withdrawn	Power output	Notes
E Class battery electric loco		E			1	1923	1930	131 kW (176 hp)	Used for maintenance in the Otira Tunnel.
EB battery loco		E^{B}		25–29	5	1925–1929	1976–1980	23 kW (31 hp)	Used for internal workshop movements. Rebuilt in 1953 to diesel electric power.

=== Electric multiple units ===
Wellington electric multiple units operate on 1500 V DC overhead. Auckland's electric multiple units run on 25 kV AC overhead.

Image	Class	Number in class	Location	In service	Formation	Passenger capacity	Notes
	DM/D	49	Wellington	1938–2012	D – DM (two-car); D – DM – D (three-car)	132 (two-car); 204 (three-car)	6 sets preserved in museum or private use.
	EM/ET	44	Wellington	1982–2016	EM – ET	148	One refurbished set preserved at Canterbury Railway Society; one Tranz Metro Blue set preserved by Wellington Heritage Multiple Unit Trust
	FP/FT	83	Wellington	2010–present	FP – FT	147	Named Matangi, after the Māori word for "wind".
	AM	95	Auckland	2014–present	AMP – AMT – AMA	230	

=== Railcars ===
Livery: The first railcars were painted "carnation red" with a white or yellow stripe. The Silver Fern railcars appeared in stainless steel.

All railcars, unless otherwise stated, are designated RM class. Here, they are classified under their common names.

Image	Class	Number in class	In service	Power type	Passenger capacity	Notes
	88-seater	35	1955–1978	Diesel-mechanical	88	Alternatively known as Fiats, Eighty-Eights, or Twinset railcars. After withdrawal, 14 were converted to locomotive-hauled AC class articulated carriages known as "Grassgrubs" due to their green colour.
	Silver Fern	3	1972–2019	Diesel-electric	96	Auckland – Wellington service, 1972–1991. Geyserland Express, Kaimai Express and Waikato Connection 1991–2001; used for excursions until 2019. Now withdrawn.
	Standard	6	1938–1972	Diesel-mechanical	48–52	Preserved examples exist at Silver Stream Railway (Wellington), Glenbrook Vintage Railway (Auckland) and Pahiatua Railcar Society (near Palmerston North).
	Vulcan	9	1940–1978	Diesel-mechanical	48–50	Examples are preserved at Ferrymead Railway, Christchurch (3 of) and Plains Railway, Ashburton (1 of).
	Wairarapa	7	1936–1956	Diesel-mechanical	25–49	The remaining example is currently being restored by Pahiatua Railcar Society (near Palmerston North).

Experimental railcars included the following:

Image	Class	Number in class	In service	Power type	Passenger capacity	Notes
MacEwan-Pratt railcar	MccEwan-Pratt petrol railcar	1	1912–1913	Petrol	12	Never in revenue service. Not preserved.
Clayton Steam Railcar	Clayton steam railcar	1	1926–1937	Coal		Originally worked the Kurow branch, and later in Otago and Southland. Not preserved.
Edison battery-electric railcar	Edison battery-electric railcar	1	1926–1934	Electric (battery)	60 seated, 70 total.	Used on Little River branch. Destroyed by fire.
Sentinel-Cammell railcar	Sentinel-Cammell steam railcar	1	1925–1931	Coal	48	Used on Melling and then Thames branches. Not preserved.
Leyland petrol railcar	Leyland experimental petrol railcar	1	1925	Petrol		Never entered revenue service.
Model T railcar	Model T Ford railcar	2	1925–1931	Petrol	11 plus driver	Operated on Greytown branch and in Southland. A replica operates on the Pleasant Point Railway, near Timaru.
Leyland railbus 1936	Leyland diesel railbus	2	1936–1942	Diesel	19 or 8 plus 1 ton of newspapers.	Served on Midland Line and the west coast. None preserved.

=== Diesel multiple units ===
Image	Class	Number in class	In service	Formation	Passenger capacity	Notes
	ADK/ADB	9	1993–2014	ADK – ADB	134	Ex Transperth, used on Auckland suburban network. None preserved.
	ADL/ADC	10	1993–2022	ADL – ADC	128	Ex Transperth, used on Auckland suburban network.

=== Steam locomotives ===
Livery: New Zealand steam locomotives after the late 1920s were mainly completely black with red buffer beams at each end. Earlier steam locomotives were more varied in colour with polished brasswork and a contrasting lining on the cab sides and side tanks, for example the green of the F class Peveril.

Image	Class	Numbers	Number in class	Year(s) introduced	Year(s) withdrawn	Whyte notation	Notes
	A of 1873		14	1873	1905	0-4-0T	
A class of 1905	A of 1906		58	1906	1969	4-6-2	Includes 30 locomotives reclassified from A^{D}
	A^{A}		10	1914	1957	4-6-2	Improved Q Class design
	A^{B}		141	1915	1969	4-6-2	New Zealand's most prolific steam locomotive; ten were rebuilt from W^{AB} class. Preserved examples at Pleasant Point Railway (near Timaru), Steam Incorporated Paekakariki, Mainline Steam Heritage trust, Kingston Flyer (near Queenstown), Glenbrook/Motat (Auckland).
A class of 1905	A^{D}		30	1910	1916	4-6-2	Reclassified A in 1916.
B class of 1874	B of 1874		2	1874	1890	0-4-4-0T; Double Fairlie	
B class of 1899	B of 1899		10	1899	1967	4-8-0	Three rebuilt as W^{E} class
	B^{A}		10	1911	1969	4-8-0	
BB class	B^{B}		30	1915	1968	4-8-0	
BC class	B^{C}		1	1902	1927	2-8-2	Originally from the Wellington and Manawatu Railway, which was nationalised in 1908.
	C of 1873		16	1873	1920	0-4-0ST original 0-4-2ST rebuild	
	C of 1930		24	1930	1968	2-6-2	Built for heavy shunting at major yards, one preserved at Silverstream Railway (Wellington) and one at Ferrymead Railway (Christchurch).
	D of 1874		35	1874	1927	2-4-0T	A low powered locomotive, with many finding a second life as industrial locomotives or with the Public Works dept. Seven have survived, with operational examples at the Pleasant Point Railway (near Timaru) and Ferrymead (Christchurch). Static examples are at Silverstream Railway (Wellington) and Ocean Beach Railway (Dunedin).
	E of 1872		8	1872	1906	0-4-4-0T; Double Fairlie	A double fairlie, originally used only in the South Island, but one was used by the Public Works Dept. in the North Island. An static example of the E Class is preserved at the Otago Settlers Museum, Dunedin.
	E of 1906		1	1906	1917	2-6-6-0T; Mallet	
	F		88	1872	1964	0-6-0T	Ubiquitous and long-serving, nine examples of this class are preserved. Used in all roles, including mainline use and shunting.
	F^{A}		13	1892	1943	0-6-2T	
	F^{B}		13	1897	1943	0-6-2T	
	G of 1874		4	1874	1918	4-4-0ST	
	G of 1928		3	1928	1937	4-6-2+2-6-4; Garratt	The only Garrett-type locomotive in NZ, they were not a success. All rebuilt as Pacifics, and became the G class of 1937. None preserved.
	G of 1937		6	1937	1956	4-6-2	Rebuilt from the unsuccessful Garrett G class of 1928. None preserved.
	H	199–204	6	1878	1955	0-4-2T; Fell	Built to work the Rimutaka Incline, H 199 is the only remaining Fell locomotive in the world and is preserved in the Fell Locomotive Museum at Featherston, just north of Wellington.
	J of 1874		32	1874	1935	2-6-0	First locomotive class in NZ with a tender.
	J of 1939	1200–1239	40	1939	1971	4-8-2	A powerful, yet lighter locomotive than the K class. Coal burning and initially streamlined, 12 members of the class were rebuilt as J^{B} class, being oil burners. Two operating examples remain, one at Mainline Steam and the other at Steam Incorporated.
	J^{A}	1240–1290	51	1946–1956	1964 – 1971	4-8-2	1240 to 1274 were used exclusively in the South Island, and were coal burners. The second batch of 16 were oil burners, built by North British Locomotive Works. These were numbered 1275 to 1290 and were used in the North Island. The class includes J^{A} 1274 – the last NZR steam locomotive built. Seven preserved, including at Mainline Steam, Plains railway (Ashburton), Steam Incorporated, Glenbrook Vintage Railway (Auckland) and a static exhibit in Dunedin.
	J^{B}		12			4-8-2	12 locomotives were rebuilt from the 1939 J class as oil burners.
	K of 1877		8	1877	1927	2-4-2	Originally used solely in the South Island, including on the famous Kingston Flyer, they later received minor use in the North Island.
	K of 1932	900–929	30	1932	1967	4-8-4	
	K^{A}	930–964	35	1939–1950	1964 – 1967	4-8-4	A modified version of the K class, with roller bearings and ACFI feedwater heaters.
	K^{B}	965–970	6	1939	1968	4-8-4	A coal burning locomotive that was a K^{A} class fitted with trailing-wheel boosters. Used solely in the South Island, almost exclusively on the Midland Line between Springfield and Arthur's Pass. A non-operating example is preserved at Mainline Steam, Christchurch.
	L		10	1877	1901–1939	2-4-0T; 4-4-0T; 4-4-2T	
	L^{A}		5	1887–1892	1920 – 1928	4-4-0T	Originally from the New Zealand Midland Railway, which was nationalised in 1900.
	M		4	1875	1919–1928	0-6-0T; 2-4-4T	
	N		12	1885	1934	2-6-2	Two originally from the Wellington and Manawatu Railway (nationalised 1908).
	N^{A}		2	1894	1929	2-6-2	Originally from Wellington and Manawatu Railway (nationalised 1908).
	N^{C}		2	1902	1931	2-6-2	Originally from Wellington and Manawatu Railway (nationalised 1908).
	O		6	1885	1922	2-8-0	
	O^{A}		1	1894	1929	2-8-0	Originally from Wellington & Manawatu Railway (nationalised 1908).
	O^{B}		2	1888	1931	2-8-0	Originally from Wellington and Manawatu Railway (nationalised 1908).
	O^{C}		1	1896	1930	2-8-0	Originally from Wellington and Manawatu Railway (nationalised 1908).
	P of 1876		2	1876	1885	0-6-0ST	
	P of 1885		10	1885	1930	2-8-0	
	Q of 1878		2	1878	1898	2-4-4T	
	Q of 1901		13	1901	1957	4-6-2	The world's first class of 4-6-2 Pacific locomotive.
	R		18	1878	1936	0-6-4T; Single Fairlie	A Single Fairlie locomotive, designed for the tight curves and steep grades characteristic of rail in NZ at that time. Used in all roles from mainline passenger down to shunting and Public Works, private industrial and tramway use. A static example has been preserved at Reefton, on the west coast of the South Island.
	S		7	1880	1927	0-6-4T; Single Fairlie	
	T		6	1879	1928	2-8-0	
	U		9	1894	1959	4-6-0	
	U^{A}		6	1899	1937	4-6-0	
	U^{B}		22	1901	1957	4-6-0	
	U^{C}		10	1901	1959	4-6-0	
	U^{D}		2	1904	1931	4-6-0	Originally from the Wellington & Manawatu Railway, which was nationalised in 1908.
	V		13	1885	1937	2-6-2	Three originally from the Wellington and Manawatu Railway (nationalised 1908)
	W	192, 238	2	1889	1959	2-6-2T	Tank locomotive, W 192, which was the first NZR locomotive built in New Zealand, is preserved and operational at Ferrymead Railway, Christchurch.
	W^{A}		11	1892	1962	2-6-2T	Tank locomotive, 11 built new; four rebuilt from J class 1874. W^{A}165 is believed to be the only locomotive of this class still existing. It is owned and operated by the Gisborne City Vintage Railway.
	W^{AB}		30	1918–1927	1947 – 1969	4-6-4T	14 rebuilt from W^{S} class; 10 rebuilt as A^{B} class
	W^{B}		12	1898	1957	2-6-2T	
	W^{D}		18	1901	1936	2-6-4T	
	W^{E}		3	1902	1969	4-6-4T	Rebuilt from B of 1899; equipped with Fell centre rail braking for use on the Rimutaka Incline and Rewanui Incline.
	W^{F}		41	1904	1969	2-6-4T	
	W^{G}		20	1910	1964	4-6-4T	14 later rebuilt as W^{W} class.
	W^{H}		3	1884	1927	2-4-2T	Originally from Wellington and Manawatu Railway (nationalised 1908)
	W^{J}		1	1904	1928	2-8-4T	Originally from Wellington and Manawatu Railway (nationalised 1908)
	W^{S}		14	1917	1936	4-6-4T	All rebuilt as W^{AB} class
	W^{W}		51	1913	1969	4-6-4T	14 rebuilt from W^{G} class
	X		18	1909	1957	4-8-2	The world's first 4-8-2 Mountain locomotive
	Y		3	1923	1958	0-6-0T	

Steam locomotive notes:

1. Two other types of locomotives built in the 1870s were included in the A class. All three had a wheel arrangement of 0-4-0T, but were technically and aesthetically quite different. The other A types are often known as the Shanks A and the Mills A, after their respective builders.
2. A completely different type of locomotive was nominally classified as being the solitary member of the S class in 1877 (the main S class was not introduced until 1880), but it was typically known as Robina.

Two documentaries made in 2000 and 2001 by film maker Nick Lera feature a selection of steam locomotives then operating on North Island and South Island, including cab rides to the Raurimu Spiral.

== Industrial locomotives ==
A number of industrial locomotives were used by various operators connecting to the national rail network:

=== 0-6-0 shunting locomotives ===
Similar to the NZR DS class:

- Drewry 2248/1947 was built for the Ohai Railway Board as their N^{O} 1. The railway was operated by the State Mines, and in 1968, Drewry 2248 was dispatched with its sister, N^{O} 2, to the State Mines railway between Stirling and Kaitangata in Otago. In 1974, both locomotives moved to Rotowaro in the North Island, where they both finished working. In 1986, the locomotive was withdrawn and sold to the Bush Tramway Club at Pukemiro Junction on the former Glen Afton Branch. On 21 October 2014, Drewry 2248 arrived at the Rimutaka Incline Railway Heritage Trusts Maymorn site after being purchased for restoration. Currently, Drewry 2248 is wearing a dark green livery in place of its original red.
- Drewry 2585/1957 shares a similar operating history to Drewry 2248. Built for the ORB as their N^{O} 2, it ended up at Rotowaro in 1986, and was purchased by the Bush Tramway Club. However, in 2005 it was purchased by the Wallis family to start the 'Waikato Railway Heritage Trust', and moved to nearby Ngauruwahia. In April 2008 it moved again to Ngongotahā, and is now owned by the Rotorua-Ngongotaha Railway Trust. It is currently being overhauled, and is painted in State Mines yellow instead of its original red.
- Whakatane Board Mills 103 (maker's 2258/1947) was built for use over the WBM Matahina Tramway, bringing logs back from the Matahina area over the Tramway to the mill via the NZR Taneatua Branch. It was later joined by Whakatane Board Mills 104 (maker's 2489/1951); together, the two diesels displaced ex-NZR 0-6-2T tank locomotives F^{A} 41 and F^{A} 250. In later years, the two locomotives were limited to the short length of line between the mill and the NZR connection at Awakeri and were repainted from the original black with yellow trim into a white with orange band scheme.

In 1999, Tranz Rail purchased the line between Awakeri and the mill and took over shunting operations with DBR and DSC class diesel locomotives. The two Drewrys were then onsold to Forest Loaders, a subcontractor working for Tranz Rail in the Portland area, loading log wagons at Portland. Both locomotives were renumbered by Forest Loaders as FL 106 and FL 107 respectively. Both are now preserved by the Bay of Islands Vintage Railway.

Similar to the NZR DSA class:

- W. G. Bagnall – builder's number 3079, introduced 1954 and withdrawn 1989, formerly used by Tasman Forestry.
- W. G. Bagnall – builder's number 3132, introduced 1958 and withdrawn 1990, formerly used by Portland Cement as PC 10. Preserved, Whangārei Steam and Model Railway Club.
- W. G. Bagnall – builder's number 3144, introduced 1958 and withdrawn 1990, formerly used by Portland Cement as PC 11. Preserved, Waitara Railway Preservation Society.

Similar to the NZR DSB class:

Road numbers ORBs 1 and 2
Maker's N^{o}s 1475 and 1476

Two 0-6-0 locomotives were built by Mitsubishi Heavy Industries for industrial service for the Ohai Railway Board in 1967.

- ORB 1 was withdrawn in 1989 due to heavier trains and was replaced by DJ3303. In 1990 the New Zealand Railways Corporation took over the Ohai Railway Board's section of the Wairio Branchline. It was then stored in Wairio until being sold to the Ohai Railway Board Heritage Trust for preservation.
- ORB 2 shares a similar operating history to ORB 1, but was withdrawn in 1990. Stored in Wairio until 1992 when it was purchased by Reid McNaught for Steam Incorporated and now numbered Dsb #2. It was then sold to Russell Gibbard in the early 2000s and is still in service for shunting by Steam Inc.

Road numbers 3079 (maker's number), WPC 10–11
Maker's N^{O}'s 3079, 3132, 3144

A further three 0-6-0DM locomotives were built by WG Bagnall for industrial service in New Zealand. The first, Bagnall 3079 of 1954, was delivered to Tasman Pulp & Paper for use at their Kinleith paper plant in the Bay of Plenty. The other two, maker's nos. 3132 and 3144 of 1958, were delivered to Wilsons Portland Cement for use on their private quarry railway at Portland, just south of Whangarei. All three were exactly the same as the ten NZR locomotives which were built to the same pattern as Bagnall 3079. They were initially equipped with National M4AA6 diesel engines producing 240 hp (180 kW).

All three were later re-powered by A&G Price at its Thames workshops; Bagnall 3079 with a 315 hp (235 kW) Caterpillar D343T diesel engine and Twin Disc torque converter, while the two Portland locomotives, numbered WPC 10 (3132) and WPC 11 (3144) received 204 hp (152 kW) Gardner 8L3 diesel engines which were used in the D^{S} and Drewry D^{SA} class locomotives. Bagnall 3079 was also later fitted with extra ballast weight to increase its power output

- Bagnall 3079 was withdrawn in 1989 due to the increased shunting being beyond its capabilities. Replaced by chop-nosed DA 512, it was provisionally sold to the Bay of Islands Vintage Railway who planned to have it towed by rail to their Kawakawa depot. Unfortunately NZ Rail Ltd was concerned that the tyres needed reprofiling and wanted the locomotive to be road transported to Westfield depot in Auckland for this work to be carried before it could be moved by rail. Unable to meet the cost of transporting the locomotive and reprofiling the tyres, the BoIVR were unable to move the locomotive and it was later scrapped at Kinleith in 1990.
- WPC 10 and 11 were retired in 1990 when the Portland quarry railway closed. Both were sold to Kamo Engineering and were moved to their yard where the Gardner 8L3 engines were removed and fitted in a ship. After being stored in the yard for 15 years both were sold in 2005:
- WPC 10 was purchased by the Whangarei Steam and Model Railway Club and moved to their short line at the Whangarei Museum, Kamo in 2005. It has been cosmetically overhauled pending the arrival of a replacement Gardner 8L3 or similar low-revolution diesel engine. Its current livery is that of Wilsons Portland Cement Ltd, but with a darker shade of blue used in place of the original.
- WPC 11 moved to the Waitara Railway Preservation Society depot at Waitara Road (Brixton) in 2005. It stayed here for five years before moving to the Taranaki Flyer Trust's depot in the former Stratford goods shed. Since the trust folded this has returned to Waitara. Bagnall 3144 has not been restored and retains its original Portland Blue livery, albeit heavily faded and rust-streaked. A Gardner 8L3 engine has been acquired for this locomotive when restoration commences.
