= NZR E class =

NZR E class could refer to one of these classes of locomotives operated by New Zealand Railways:

- NZR E class (1872)
- NZR E class (1906)
- New Zealand E class locomotive (1922)
