= NZR C class =

NZR C class may refer to two different classes of steam locomotives operated by the New Zealand Railways Department:

- NZR C class (1873), also known as the "little" or "original" C class
- NZR C class (1930), also known as the "big" C class
