= NZR D class =

The New Zealand Railways Department operated two classes of steam locomotives that were classified as the D class:

- NZR D class (1874) - 33 2-4-0T tank locomotives
- NZR D class (1929) - 1 experimental 0-4-0T locomotive

The D class unpowered suburban passenger coach, together with a powered DM class, make up a type of electric multiple unit used in the Wellington area.
