= New Zealand EB class locomotive =

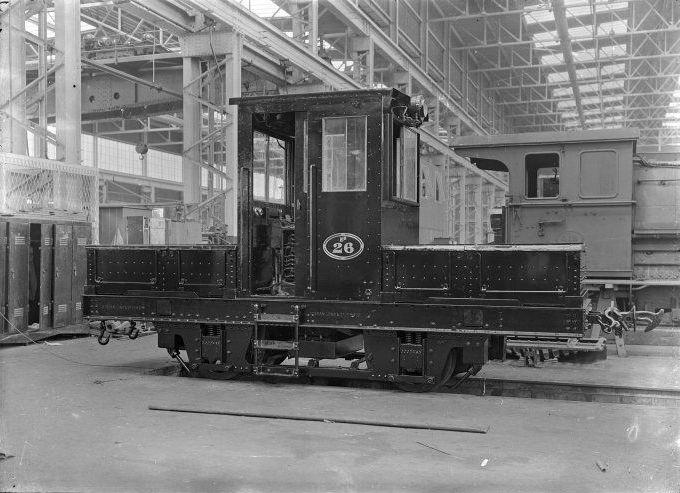
- AP Godber Collection, Alexander Turnbull Library, Wellington
Type and origin
- Power type: Battery electric, later diesel electric
- Builder: Goodman Manufacturing Company (1), and NZR (4)
Specifications
- Configuration
  - Whyte: 4wBE (later 4wDE)
  - UIC: Bo
- Gauge: 1,067 mm (3 ft 6 in)
- Length: 6.2 m (20 ft 4 in)
- Loco weight: 12 long tons (13.4 short tons; 12.2 t); Rebuilt 14 long tons (15.7 short tons; 14.2 t)
- Prime mover: AEC Comet Mark III
Performance figures
- Maximum speed: 20 km/h (12 mph)
- Power output: 23 kW (31 hp); Rebuilt 48 kW (64 hp)
Career
- Operators: New Zealand Railways
- Number in class: 5
- Numbers: Original: 25 – 29; TMS: 1809, 1815, 1821 (two did not receive TMS numbers)
- Locale: Frankton, Hutt, Hillside, Addington, and Otahuhu.
- First run: 1925, 1929; Rebuilt 1953

The New Zealand EB class locomotive (Note: Following the introduction of TMS in 1979, the class classification was capitalised, whereas previously the second letter was a smaller capital letter, that is E^{B}) was a class of five battery electric (later diesel-electric) locomotives built to perform shunting duties at the workshops of New Zealand's national rail network.

== Introduction ==
The first (later No. 29) was built in 1925 in the United States, and began its working life at Hamilton railway station in Frankton; then four years later it was transferred to Christchurch's Addington Workshops. That same year, four more were built at Hutt Workshops (No's 25 and 26) and Hillside Workshops (No's 27 and 28); they were stationed at main workshops around the country.

== Conversion ==
New batteries were required in 1937, and although conversion into diesel-electric locomotives was proposed, rebuilding was not undertaken until the early 1950s. In their new guise, the locomotives survived well into the 1970s.

== Withdrawal ==
The first to be withdrawn was EB 27 in 1976, and two years later, the class leader, EB 25, was also removed from service. It has been preserved by Auckland's Museum of Transport and Technology. The other three locomotives survived long enough to receive TMS numbers – EB 26 became EB 1809, EB 28 became EB 1815, and EB 29 became EB 1821. The latter two were withdrawn in 1980, but EB1809, now stationed in Napier, was reclassified as a member of the TR class, TR1003. After it was withdrawn, it was saved for preservation and is now serviceable at the Silver Stream Railway.

== See also ==
- E class locomotive, the other, earlier example of a battery-electric locomotive to operate in New Zealand
