= NZR P class =

NZR P class could refer to one of these classes of locomotives operated by New Zealand Railways:

- NZR P class (1876)
- NZR P class (1885)
