= NZR D class (1874) =

Class of New Zealand steam locomotives

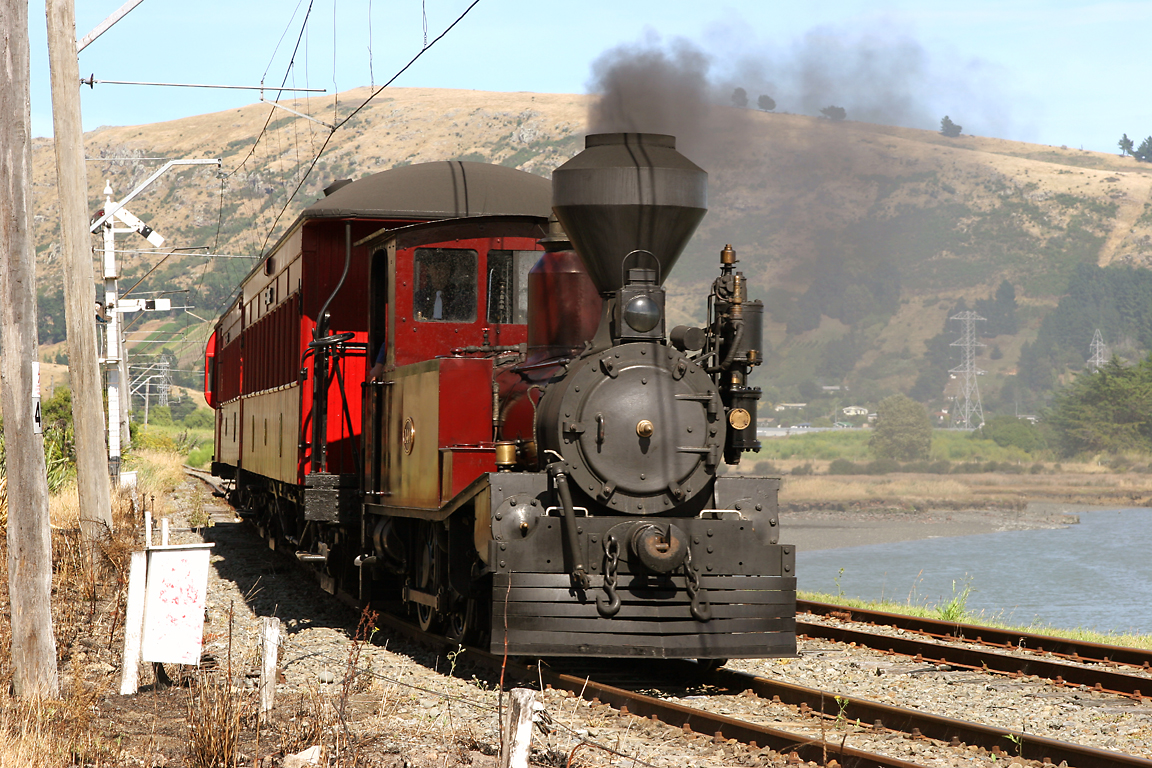
- D 140, preserved and in operation at the Ferrymead Railway
Type and origin
- Power type: Steam
- Builder: (United Kingdom) Dübs and Company (5), (United Kingdom) Neilson and Company (19), (New Zealand) Scott Brothers (11)
- Build date: 1874–1890
Specifications
- Configuration
  - Whyte: 2-4-0T
  - UIC: 1B nt
- Gauge: 3 ft 6 in (1,067 mm)
- Driver dia.: 36 in (914 mm)
- Length: 21 ft 6 in (6.55 m)
- Adhesive weight: 11 long tons 10 cwt (25,800 lb or 11.7 t)
- Loco weight: 14 long tons 14 cwt (32,900 lb or 14.9 t)
- Fuel type: Coal
- Fuel capacity: 0 long tons 11 cwt (1,200 lb or 0.6 t)
- Water cap.: 300 imp gal (1,400 L; 360 US gal)
- Firebox
  - Grate area: 7.3 sq ft (0.68 m^{2})
- Boiler pressure: 130 psi (0.90 MPa)
- Heating surface: 392 sq ft (36.4 m^{2})
- Cylinders: Two, outside
- Cylinder size: 9.5 in × 18 in (241 mm × 457 mm)
Performance figures
- Tractive effort: 4,693 lbf (20.88 kN)
Career
- Operators: Public Works Department; New Zealand Railways Department
- Number in class: 35
- Numbers: 6, 16, 18, 46-51, 108-9, 130-1, 137-145, 149, 169-171, 195-98, 221-2, 240, 315, 578
- First run: May 1874
- Last run: March 1927
- Disposition: Seven preserved, one converted into diesel-mechanical, remainder scrapped

NZR D class steam tank locomotives operated on New Zealand's national railway network. The first entered service in 1874 all had been withdrawn by the end of 1927, which allowed the D classification to be used again in 1929.

== Introduction ==
The boiler and cylinders were the same as the slightly earlier C class, but its driving wheels had a larger diameter and it was aesthetically different from the C. The class was ordered in a number of batches: eight from Neilson and Company in 1874, five from Dübs and Company and four from Neilson in 1878, seven from Neilson in 1880, ten from Scott Brothers in 1887, and the final D from Scott Brothers in 1890. The order with Scott Brothers, placed in 1884, was the first large-scale construction of locomotives in New Zealand.

== Names ==
Four of the 1874 locomotives were named:

- D 143: Trout
- D 144: Kingfisher
- D 169: Possum
- D 240: Snapper

== Operation ==
The class was not particularly powerful and was employed on light duties, sometimes achieving speeds of 72.4 km/h (45 mph) on a level grade. They often saw service on commuter trains between Christchurch and Lyttelton until superior locomotives took their place, and they were utilised at other major locations on the South Island's east coast. In the North Island, D 137 was used in 1905 as part of a "railcar" trial service between Lower Hutt and Upper Hutt, hauling a carriage that seated 24 first class passengers, 48 second class passengers, and had a guard's compartment. It was inspired by locomotive/carriage combinations the General Manager of NZR witnessed in the eastern United States. The combination was overpowered and uneconomic and did not last long in service.

== Withdrawal ==
The first D to leave NZR's service went to the Public Works Department in 1899, and three more followed in the next two years, one to the PWD and the other two to private businesses. The rest of the class continued to operate for over a decade. Withdrawal began during World War I; the class had long since been superseded by newer and more powerful engines, but they were ideally sized for private sidings and bush tramways, so many were sold rather than scrapped. Only eight remained in service at the start of 1920, and the last left NZR in May 1927. The PWD and private industries continued to use them for decades - a few examples survived into the 1960s. This included D 137, which operated until 1963 on the truncated portion of the Hutt Valley Line that remained as an industrial rail siding for the Gear Meat Preserving and Freezing Company.

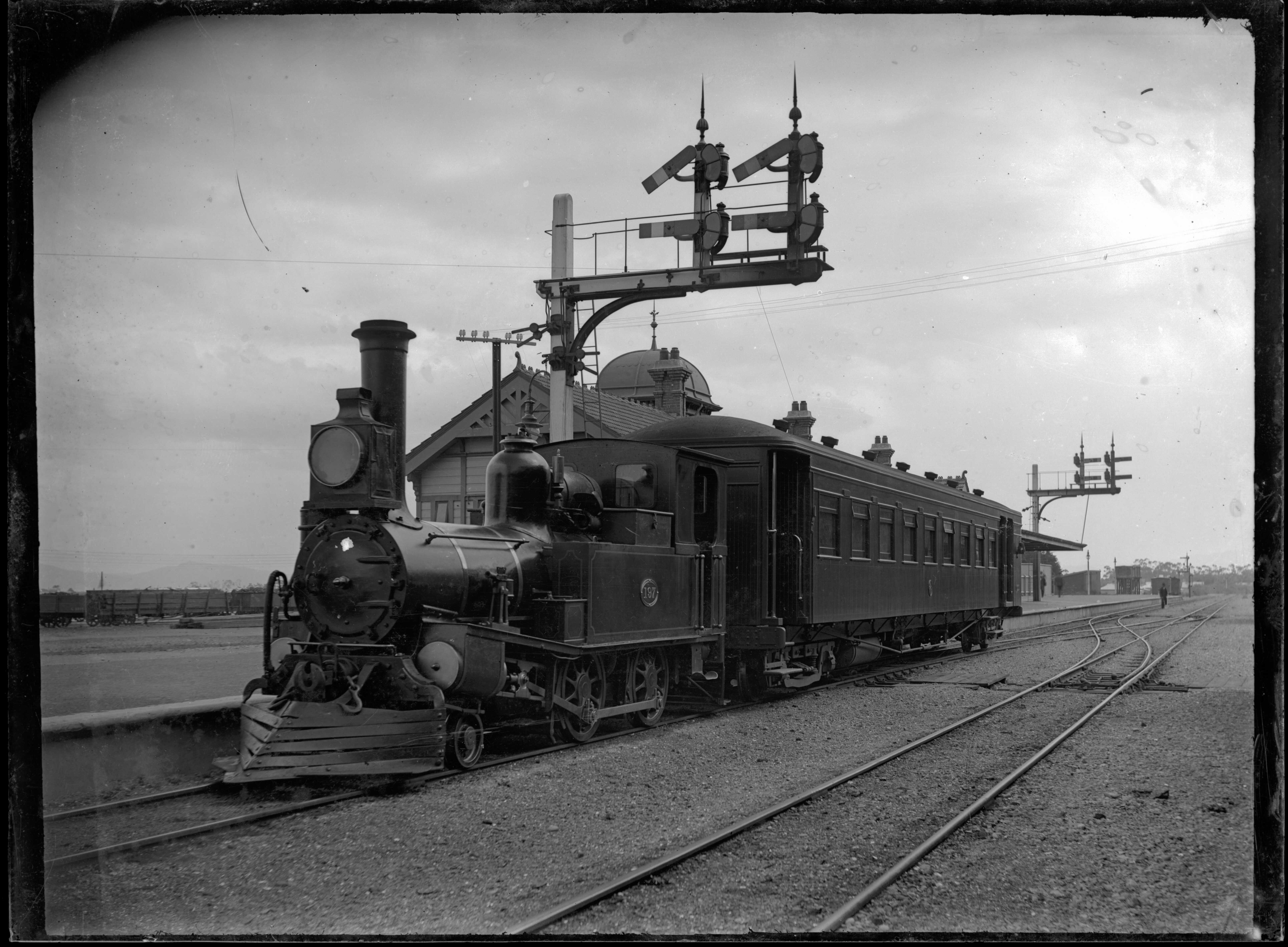
D Class no 197 at Lower Hutt, 1906 with a motor train.

== Preservation ==
Seven locomotives have been preserved, with two operational.

- The first to be returned to operational condition was D 16, owned by the Pleasant Point Museum and Railway.
- Next was D 140 at the Ferrymead Railway.
- D 6 is owned by the Ocean Beach Railway and is to be restored by Bulleid Engineering in Winton for static display at Lumsden.
- D 137 and D 143 are awaiting restoration at the Silver Stream Railway.
- D 170 was on static display at Helensville station, until October 2024 when it was transferred back to MOTAT (who owns D 170) to be placed in storage to prevent further deterioration from the elements.
- D 221 is on static display in Centennial Park in Kaitaia
- Another D (number unknown) is in a paddock in Kaingaroa.

== See also ==
- NZR A class (1873)
- NZR C class (1873)
- NZR P class (1876)
- Locomotives of New Zealand
