= New Zealand TR class locomotive =

Class of shunting locomotives

New Zealand TR class
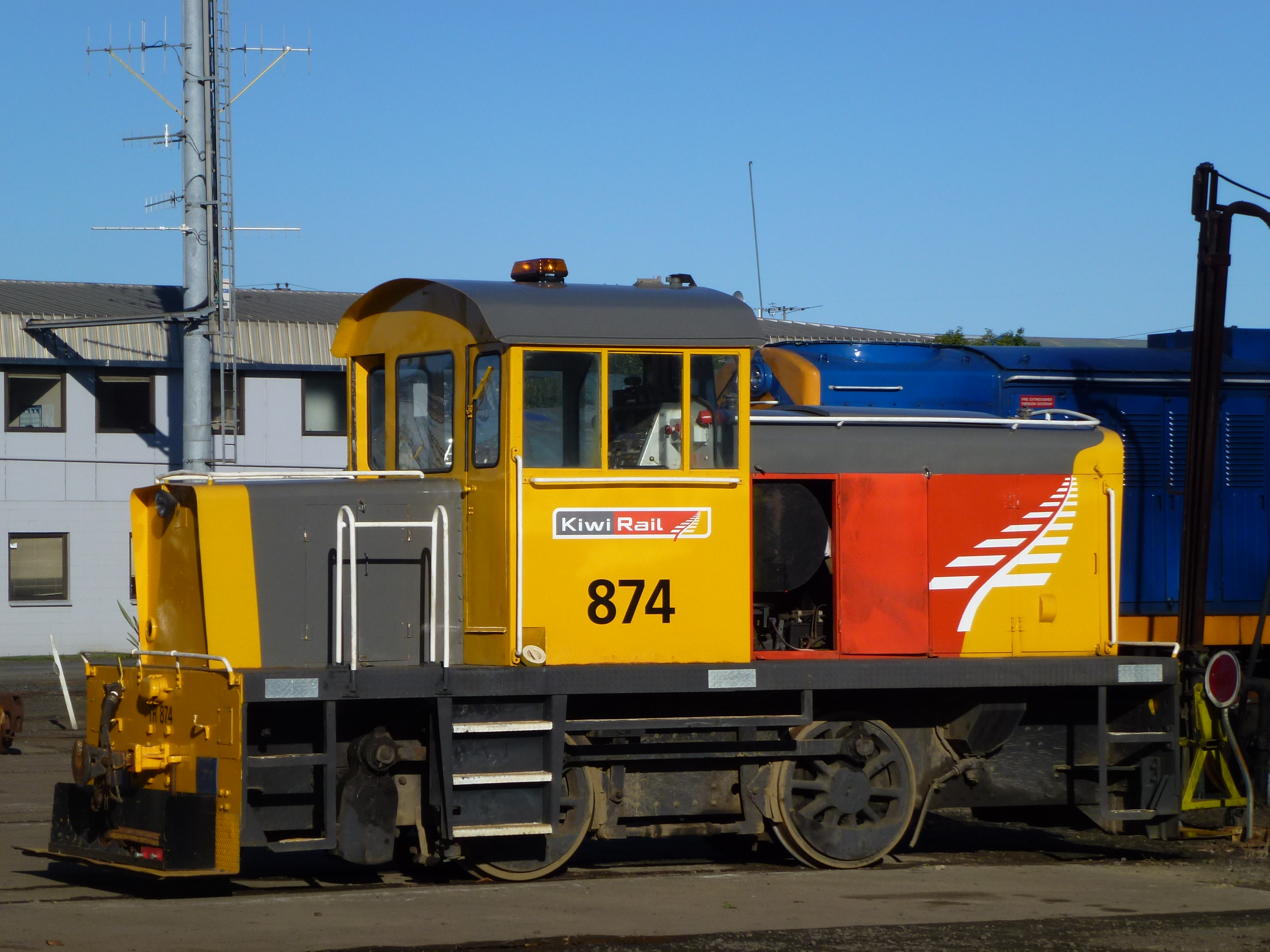
- Hillside NZR built TR874 at Dunedin in 2013.
Type and origin
- Power type: Diesel-Mechanical/Hydraulic
- Builder: NZR Petone Workshops (1), Drewry Car Co. (29), A & G Price (41), W. G. Bagnall (7), Hitachi (6), NZR Hillside Workshops (9), Muir-Hill (4), Hudswell Clarke (3), F. C. Hibberd & Co. (2), Robert Stephenson and Hawthorns (5)
- Build date: 1924-1978
Specifications
- Configuration
  - Whyte: 0-4-0, 0-6-0
- Gauge: 1,067 mm (3 ft 6 in)
- Loco weight: 9.4–20.8 t (9.3–20.5 long tons; 10.4–22.9 short tons)
- Prime mover: Detroit 4-71, Gardner 8LW, Gardner 6L3, Gardner 6LW, McLaren M6, Gardner 6LX, Cummins 6 cyl
Performance figures
- Maximum speed: 24–40 km/h (15–25 mph)
Career
- Operators: NZR, New Zealand Railways Corporation, Tranz Rail, Toll Rail, KiwiRail
- Number in class: 90
- Nicknames: "Rosie" (T^{R} 107), "Timmy" (T^{R} 163), "Tonka Toy" (TR 534)
- First run: 1936
- Current owner: KiwiRail
- Disposition: 13 in service; 6 withdrawn; 36 preserved, 32 scrapped, 1 in service for an industrial user.

The New Zealand TR class locomotive (Note: Following the introduction of TMS in 1979, the class classification was capitalised, whereas previously the second letter was a smaller capital letter, that is T^{R}) is a type of diesel shunting locomotives built by many different manufacturers. Defined as "shunting tractors" or "rail tractors" by KiwiRail and its predecessors,, they are classified "TR" for tractor as a result. Many of these locomotives have been withdrawn, but some are still in service. The first locomotive of this class was built by NZR in 1924. The most powerful were Japanese-built Hitachi TRs, with 138 kW Cummins engines.

== Operation ==
The typical role of a TR was at small stations where a normal shunting locomotive was not needed due to light traffic. NZR's operating rules allowed TRs to be driven by staff that were not members of the locomotive branch, saving on wages. Other roles have included shunting at railway workshops and depots, and most of the remaining locomotives can still be found at these locations. There are very few stations where they are still in use owing to rationalisations of freight terminals, the trend towards containerisation of traffic, and roving shunting services. A number of locomotives have been leased to industrial operators for private siding use.

The last TR was built in 1978, TR191. The greatly reduced needs of NZR and its successors for this type of locomotive, and industrial requirements being able to be handled by other ex-NZR classes or locomotives obtained from elsewhere, has meant no new TR class locomotives have been added since then. Four locomotives have been reclassified from other types.

The TR classification has been applied to two former industrial locomotives. One of these is TR81, which was purchased from the Ohai Railway Board in 1955. Built by the Drewry Car Co in the 1930s, it is similar to the first generation 0-4-0 Drewry TRs but was originally fitted with the Gardner 6LW diesel engine. The other is A&G Price no. 222 which was acquired from Pacific Metal Industries in the early 2000s. It was built in 1968 with a 307 hp (229 kW) diesel engine and is of the 0-6-0 wheel arrangement. Originally reclassified DSA222, it now carries the number TR1026.

In the 1990s, EB26 at Napier was reclassified as TR1003 and used in the area for shunting work. The EB class were formerly workshops' shunting locomotives. The Plains Vintage Railway & Historical Museum of Ashburton, a heritage railway, also reclassified two former industrial locomotives as T^{R}. Although A & G Price built similar locomotives for NZR, plus a James & Frederick Howard's former Public Works Department shunter no. 976. These locomotives were never owned by New Zealand Railways Department or their successors and thus their T^{R} classification and numbers are historically fictitious.

On 16 March 2022 KiwiRail announced the retirement of its oldest locomotive, dating from 1936, an 85-year-old diesel shunt locomotive TR56. This locomotive had been based at the Hutt Workshops since the late 1960s. TR56 was gifted to the Rail Heritage Trust for use on the Silver Stream Railway. The replacement is battery-powered and zero-emission; one of 14 300-tonne and 2 110-tonne battery-powered shunt engines purchased.

== Manufacturers ==
=== Petone Railway Workshops ===
Petone Workshop built TR1, about 1925. AP Godber collection, Alexander Turnbull Library.

The first TR shunting locomotive built was TR1, constructed at Petone Workshops, New Zealand in July 1924. It was built from a standard Fordson 22 hp tractor, which was attached to a patent underframe supplied by the Adamson Motor Company of Birmingham, Alabama. It was used until the 1940s for light shunting in various parts of the North Island.

=== Muir-Hill ===
In 1928, NZR purchased two small TR locomotives from Muir-Hill Equipment Limited of Manchester. The locomotives were similar to one supplied to the Department of External Affairs for use on the Telefunken Railroad in Samoa. This locomotive was eventually sent to New Zealand to the Department of Public Works, and then handed to NZR in 1940. All examples were written off by 1948.

=== Muir-Hill and A & G Price ===
A further three locomotives were ordered by NZR from A & G Price of Thames in 1930. A&G Price constructed the locomotives to the same design as the two Muir-Hill locomotives previously supplied to NZR. They entered service in 1931. The last one was written off and scrapped in 1950.

=== Drewry Car Co ===
The original batch of six 0-4-0 TRs, 13-18, supplied in 1936 by the Drewry Car Co., was supplemented by TR 20-22 and 30-36 in 1939-40. These were powered by Parsons petrol engines. In 1939-40 seven 0-6-0 TRs (the only ones of this type), 23-29, were supplied and were fitted with Leyland 10-litre (610 cu in) petrol engines. Finally, in 1950 five 0-4-0 TRs, 60-64, with diesel engines were introduced. The locomotives were built at various United Kingdom works, including Vulcan Foundry and Robert Stephenson and Hawthorns. Two Drewry TRs are still in service today. This locomotive, TR 56, was KiwiRail's oldest locomotive (being introduced in 1936) and was used at their Hutt Workshops for light shunting duties, until replaced by a battery shunt and transferred to Silver Stream Railway in 2022. TR23 was restored by the Gisborne City Vintage Railway in February 2013 and is still in use by them. TR18 is restored and active at Pleasant Point Museum and Railway.

Rebuilds

- TR 23-29 were re-engined from 1954 with Gardner 8LW engines developing 78 kW (105 hp) at 1200 rpm, transmission being a Wilson 4-speed gearbox.
- TR 13-18, 20-22 and 30-36 were re-engined from 1958, and TR 81 in 1968, with the Detroit Diesel 4-71 series engine developing 78 kW (105 hp) at 2000 rpm, transmitting through an Allison torque converter.

=== Hudswell Clarke ===
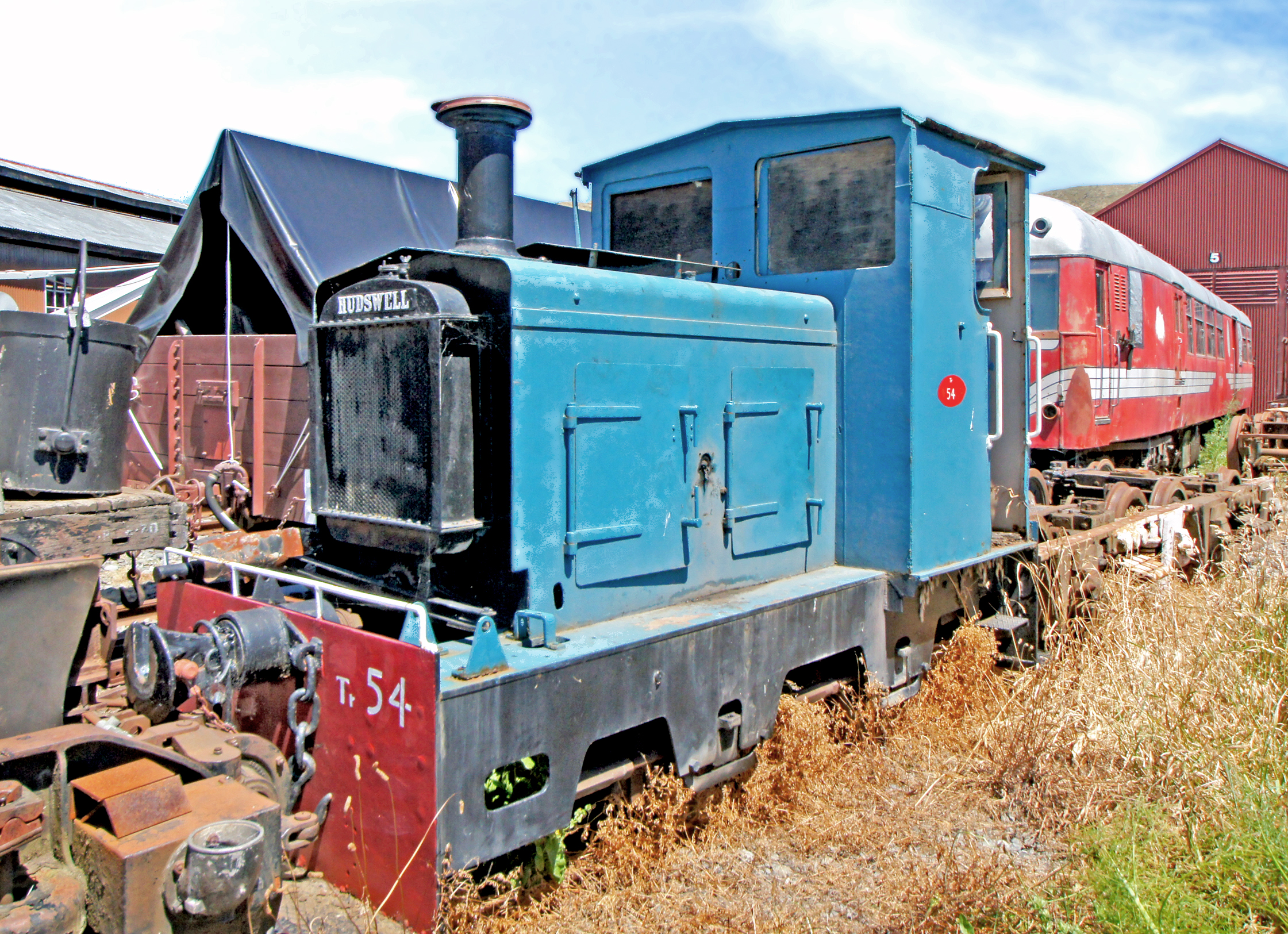
Hudswell Clarke TR54 at Ferrymead Railway in 2012.

Built by Hudswell Clarke originally for the Public Works Department as part of a batch of 12 built in 1936, three locomotives were transferred to NZR, one in 1942, another in 1950 and the final in 1954.

=== W. G. Bagnall ===
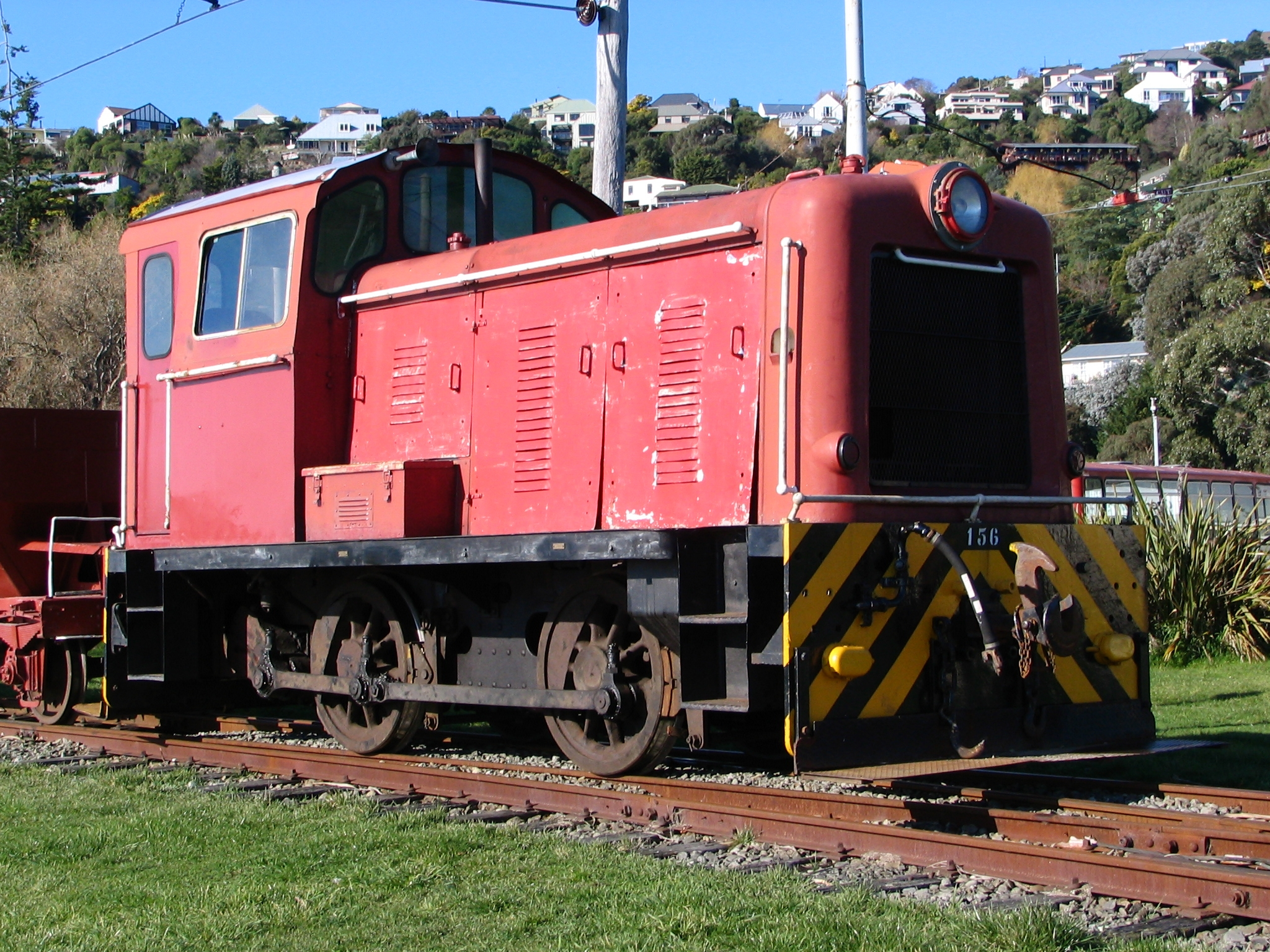
Bagnall built TR156 at Ferrymead

W G Bagnall built seven TRs in 1956-57. The first five were supplied with McLaren M6 engines, the last two with Gardner 6L3 engines, all with a Self-Changing Gears 4-speed gearbox. The McLaren engines were unsuccessful, so from 1973 TR 150-154 were re-engined with the Gardner 6LX with Twin Disc torque converters. These TRs were the heaviest and one of the more powerful types.

=== A & G Price ===
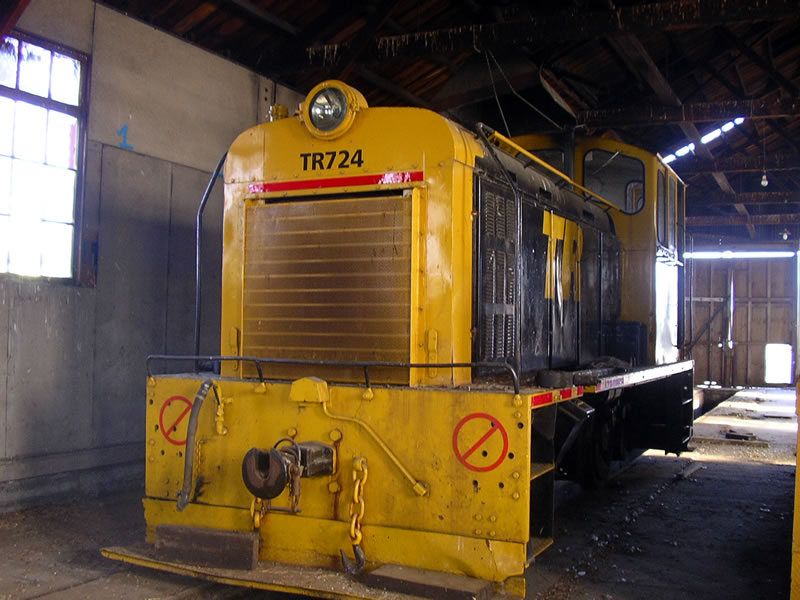
A&G Price built T^{R} 170 (TR724 TMS)

The long-established New Zealand engineering firm A & G Price of Thames supplied a total of 39 TRs, making them the largest single builder. Four different models were supplied: the Model 3 (TR 100-109), with Gardner 6LW engine and self-changing gears, 4-speed gearbox; the Model 9 (TR 110-118), powered by a Gardner 6LW engine and Twin Disc torque converter; the Model 4 (TR 157-161), McLaren M6 engine and SCG 4-speed gearbox; and the Model 6 (TR 162-176), engine Gardner 6L3, also SCG 4-speed gearbox. The McLaren-engined TRs were re-powered from 1975 with Gardner 6LX engines and the gearbox was replaced with a Twin Disc torque converter. Three of the A & G Price TRs remain in service.

=== Hitachi, Japan ===
In 1969, Hitachi received an order for six TRs, 177-182, at a time when NZR was turning away from traditional English suppliers and purchasing an increased number of vehicles from Asia. The locomotives were equipped with a Cummins 6-cylinder engine developing 138 kW (185 hp) and Niigata torque converter, making them the most powerful TRs. Five of the Hitachi TRs remain in service.

=== NZR Hillside workshops ===
The last TRs were manufactured by NZR at its Hillside workshops. Up to two were completed each year between 1973 and 1978 (TR 183-191). The design is an unusual (for a TR) centre-cab style with a single Gardner 6LX engine and Rolls-Royce torque converter. Standard parts such as DSC class windows were utilised in these TRs. Seven of these TRs remain in service.

== Liveries ==
All TR class locomotives were initially introduced in the "Midland Red" livery, with the exception of the six locomotives built by Hitachi. During the 1970s, black and yellow chevron safety stripes were added to the headstocks of all TRs. In the 1980s, the entire class was repainted in the "International Orange" livery, which featured orange hoods, yellow ends, and a grey cab.

Several locomotives later received alternative liveries. TR603 and TR920 were repainted in the "Flying Tomato" scheme, with both hoods and the cab painted red and yellow at each end. Six locomotives were repainted in the "Cato Blue" livery, consisting of a blue body, grey cab, and yellow ends. Among these, TR 943 received a unique variation with blue hoods and ends, and grey on the cab roof and hood tops.

T^{R} 109 was repainted with black and yellow chevron stripes on the headstocks and running boards, with most of the long hood painted yellow and the top quarter in red. TR626 was painted white with yellow headstocks and carried the New Zealand Rail logo on the front. TR 718 was also painted white, but with red headstocks, for use by the Westland Dairy Company.

TRs 56 and 92 were painted entirely yellow, with white numbers on the sides of their cabs. In 1994, TR943 was again repainted - this time at Hillside Workshops - in dark blue with black and yellow chevron stripes on the headstocks. It also featured the Transtec Engineering Dunedin logo on the side of the long hood.

== Table of locomotive specifications ==
Manufacturer	Drewry Car Co	Drewry Car Co	Drewry / RS&H	Drewry Car Co	A & G Price	A & G Price	W G Bagnall	W G Bagnall	A & G Price	A & G Price	Hitachi	NZR Hillside
Axles	0-4-0	0-6-0	0-4-0									
Road numbers	13-18; 20-22; 30-36	23-29	60-64	81	100-109	110-118	150-154	155, 156	157-161	162-176	177-182	183-191
Introduced	1936-40	1939-41	1949-50	1939	1956	1963-64	1956-57	1956-57	1958-59	1959-62	1969	1973-78
Number in sub-class	16	7	5	1	10	9	5	2	5	15	6	9
Length	5.1 m (17 ft)	6.2 m (20 ft)	6.6 m (22 ft)	5.0 m (16.4 ft)	6.1 m (20 ft)	6.4 m (21 ft)	7 m (23 ft)	7 m (23 ft)	7 m (23 ft)	7 m (23 ft)	7 m (23 ft)	7 m (23 ft)
Weight (Note: Weight in working order)	9.4 t (9.3 long tons; 10.4 short tons)	15.7 t (15.5 long tons; 17.3 short tons)	20.1 t (19.8 long tons; 22.2 short tons)	10.7 t (10.5 long tons; 11.8 short tons)	15.2 t (15.0 long tons; 16.8 short tons)	15.2 t (15.0 long tons; 16.8 short tons)	20.8 t (20.5 long tons; 22.9 short tons)	20.8 t (20.5 long tons; 22.9 short tons)	20.3 t (20.0 long tons; 22.4 short tons)	20.3 t (20.0 long tons; 22.4 short tons)	20.3 t (20.0 long tons; 22.4 short tons)	20.4 t (20.1 long tons; 22.5 short tons)
Engine	Parsons petrol / Detroit 4-71	Leyland petrol / Gardner 8LW	Gardner 6L3	Gardner 6LW / Detroit 4-71	Gardner 6LW	Gardner 6LW	McLaren M6 / Gardner 6LX	Gardner 6L3	McLaren M6 / Gardner 6LX	Gardner 6L3	Cummins 6 cyl	Gardner 6LX
Transmission	Wilsons 4 speed / Allison torque converter	Unknown / Wilsons 4 speed	Wilsons 4 speed	Wilsons 4 speed or Allison torque converter	SCG 4 speed	Twin Disc torque converter	SCG 4 speed / Twin Disc torque converter	SCG 4 speed	SCG 4 speed / Twin Disc torque converter	SCG 4 speed	Niigata torque converter	Rolls-Royce torque converter
Power	52 kW (70 hp) / 78 kW (105 hp)	90 kW (120 hp) / 75 kW (101 hp)	115 kW (154 hp)	76 kW (102 hp) / 78 kW (105 hp)	83 kW (111 hp)	80 kW (110 hp)	112 kW (150 hp)	114 kW (153 hp)	112 kW (150 hp)	114 kW (153 hp)	138 kW (185 hp)	112 kW (150 hp)
Tractive effort	23 kN (5,200 lb_{f})	33 kN (7,400 lb_{f})	35 kN (7,900 lb_{f})	30 kN (6,700 lb_{f})	32 kN (7,200 lb_{f})	37 kN (8,300 lb_{f})	34 kN (7,600 lb_{f})	43 kN (9,700 lb_{f})	42 kN (9,400 lb_{f})	42 kN (9,400 lb_{f})	49 kN (11,000 lb_{f})	34 kN (7,600 lb_{f})
Speed	33 km/h (21 mph)	24 km/h (15 mph)	35 km/h (22 mph)	33 km/h (21 mph)	27 km/h (17 mph)	24 km/h (15 mph)	40 km/h (25 mph)	30 km/h (19 mph)	30 km/h (19 mph)	30 km/h (19 mph)	32 km/h (20 mph)	40 km/h (25 mph)
	13-18; 20-22; 30-36	23-29	60-64	81	100-109	110-118	150-154	155, 156	157-161	162-176	177-182	183-191
