= NZR C class (1930) =

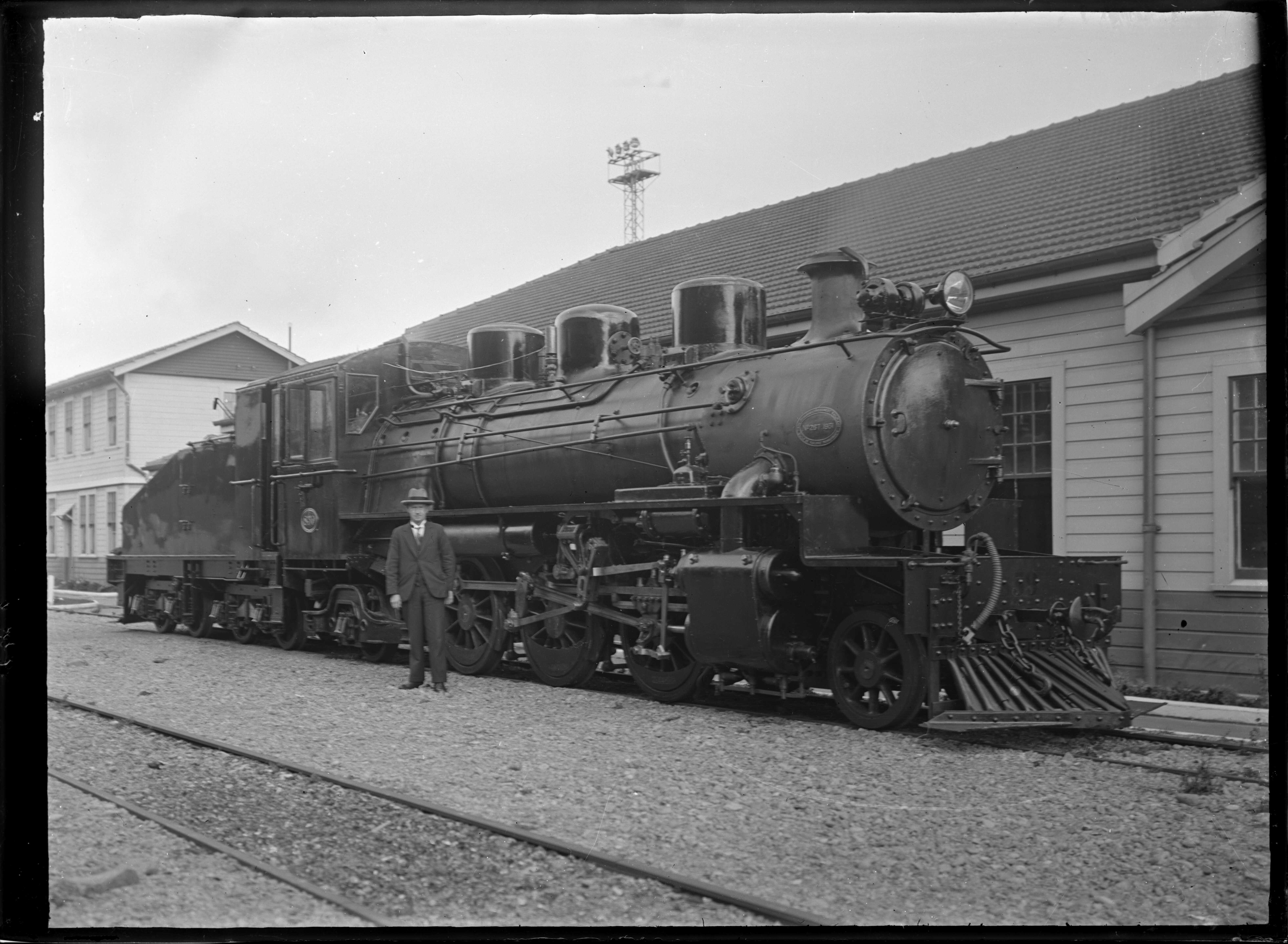
- C class 2-6-2 steam locomotive, NZR number 859, circa 1931. Godber Collection, Alexander Turnbull Library.
Type and origin
- Power type: Steam
- Builder: NZR Hillside Workshops, Dunedin (12); NZR Hutt Workshops, Lower Hutt (12)
- Serial number: 253 - 276
- Build date: 1930 - 1931
Specifications
- Configuration
  - Whyte: 2-6-2
- Gauge: 3 ft 6 in (1,067 mm)
- Driver dia.: 45 in (1.1 m)
- Length: 54 ft 6 in (16.61 m)
- Adhesive weight: 25.95 long tons (26.37 t; 29.06 short tons)
- Loco weight: 39.25 long tons (39.88 t; 43.96 short tons)
- Tender weight: 27.25 long tons (27.69 t; 30.52 short tons)
- Total weight: 66.50 long tons (67.57 t; 74.48 short tons)
- Fuel type: Coal
- Fuel capacity: 3.75 long tons (3.81 t; 4.20 short tons)
- Water cap.: 2,000 imp gal (9,100 L; 2,400 US gal)
- Firebox
  - Grate area: 24.0 sq ft (2.23 m^{2})
- Boiler pressure: 200 psi (1,400 kPa)
- Heating surface: 724 sq ft (67.3 m^{2})
- Superheater
  - Heating area: 138 sq ft (12.8 m^{2})
- Cylinders: Two
- Cylinder size: 14 in × 22 in (356 mm × 559 mm)
Performance figures
- Tractive effort: 15,330 lbf (68.2 kN)
Career
- Number in class: 24
- Numbers: 845 - 868
- Locale: All of New Zealand
- First run: October 1930
- Last run: October 1968
- Retired: July 1963 - October 1968
- Current owner: Silver Stream Railway; Canterbury Railway Society
- Disposition: Withdrawn; 2 preserved

The NZR C class consisted of twenty-four steam locomotives built to perform shunting duties on New Zealand's national rail network. It is sometimes known as the big C class to differentiate it from the C class of 1873.

== History and construction ==
In the late 1920s, trainloads were getting heavier as mainline locomotives became more powerful and increasingly capable of pulling larger loads, but the locomotives assembling and shunting these trains in railway yards were struggling to cope with the weight. Some of the older mainline locomotives that had been displaced by the newer locomotives were modified to perform shunting duties, but this was not an adequate solution. The decision was therefore taken by Chief Mechanical Engineer G. S. Lynde to design a new shunting locomotive and a committee was formed to plan the design features of the new locomotives.

The chief designing engineer, R. J. Garden, initially wanted a 0-8-0 tender locomotive. While it was agreed the new locomotive would be a tender engine rather than a tank locomotive as possibly considered, it would also be designed to pull passenger trains as well as work as a heavy shunter. The existing W^{F} class 2-6-4T tank locomotive was to be used as the basis of the new locomotive, which was to be built by NZR at their Hutt Workshops in Wellington and Hillside Workshops in Dunedin.

The C class as built were fitted with superheated boilers with wide fireboxes and developed 30% greater tractive effort than the Canterbury J class 2-6-0's and with a lightest axle loading to give the same amount of running rights as the U class 4-6-0's. The cab was the same size as that fitted to the A^{B} class while there were notable elements of American design in the slope-backed tender and a multiple-valve front-end throttle, and also design elements from W. G. Bagnall, whom Garden had worked for prior to joining the NZR in 1926. 24 locomotives were built at Hutt and Hillside Workshops, a total of 12 each, starting in October 1930 with C 845 and ending in November 1931 with C 868.

== Service ==
The C class were placed into service initially in Auckland, Wellington, and Christchurch although some locomotives did spend short periods of time in Dunedin following overhaul at Hillside Workshops or as a short-term allocation following their completion. It was found that while the C class were extremely capable, the locomotives were insufficiently heavy enough to move some of the larger trains being shunted. This led to the conversion of the B^{B} class 4-8-0s to shunting and branch line service in order to replace the C class on these heavier duties.

During their service life, the C class occasionally handled suburban trains with the Wellington-based examples doing so at times over the Hutt Valley line. The Auckland-based locomotives tended to do so only on the Onehunga Branch, while the Christchurch-based locomotives did so infrequently. It was not unknown for the Christchurch-based examples of the C class to work further afield and members of the class have been noted as working the Little River, Methven, Oxford, and Whitecliffs branches, as well as occasionally handling race trains to Sockburn.

Due to the arrival of the D^{S} class and D^{SB} class diesel shunters in 1955, the Wellington locomotives were displaced and sent to Auckland and Christchurch. Of the twenty-four, twelve were withdrawn in 1963-64 but the other engines continued running until 1968 by which time only Christchurch had a permanent allocation.

During World War II, the decision was made to fit several Wellington-based engines, particularly of the C class, with fire-fighting pumps in case of a Japanese air raid. At least one locomotive, C 849, was so fitted but the boiler-mounted pumps were not successful and relied on sufficient water supply from the locomotive's boiler to function. Following the cessation of hostilities, these pumps were quickly removed.

== Withdrawal ==
The first two C class locomotives were withdrawn in July 1963. A further eight had been withdrawn by the end of that year, with the rest being withdrawn between 1964 and 1968. By this time only three C class locomotives were left, among them C 847 and C 864. The last, C 847, was retired in October 1968. By that time the NZR&LS Canterbury Branch had purchased C 864 for preservation, and it was trucked from storage at Linwood locomotive depot in 1974 to Ferrymead Heritage Park.

One of the more unusual appointments for a C class locomotive was the use of C 849 in 1963 as the oil-holding tank at Addington Workshops. The locomotive had been withdrawn but was instead converted to replace a modified U^{C} tank wagon. Although only the tender was required for this conversion, the engine unit of C 849 remained attached until the boiler house was decommissioned and the locomotive was scrapped.

C 847 was not scrapped after withdrawal but instead remained at Linwood as a source of spares for C 864. This led to the NZR&LS Wellington Branch making an offer to purchase the relatively complete locomotive. This led to some disapproval from the Canterbury Branch, who had already stripped many good parts from it. The hulk of C 847 was towed to Wellington in 1974, suffering an overheated axle bearing along the way.

== Preservation ==
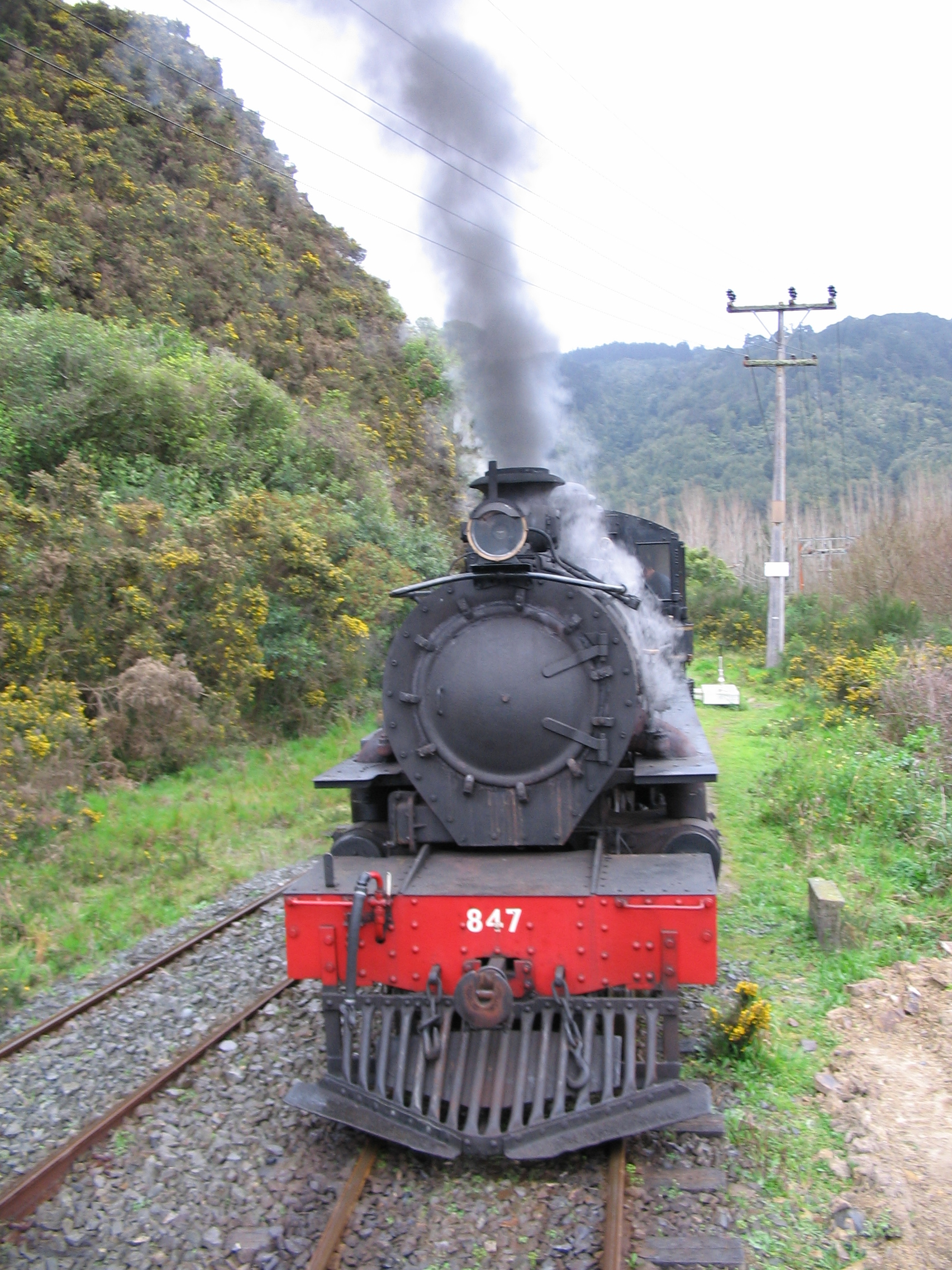
The C 847 on the Silver Stream Railway in 2006

Two C class locomotives have been preserved:

- C 847 (Hillside 255/1930) was withdrawn in October 1968 and used as a source of spare parts for the NZR&LS Canterbury Branch, who had purchased C 864 for preservation. In 1974, it was purchased by the NZR&LS Wellington Branch and was towed to their Seaview site where it remained until its transfer to the new Silver Stream Railway in the 'big move' of 1984. It remained stored at the SSR until it was trucked to the Glenbrook Vintage Railway in 1990.
  The locomotive was comprehensively restored over a four-year period and re-entered service in 1994 on the GVR. While there it made several trips on the main line to Hamilton and Huntly before returning to the SSR. C 847 was taken out of service in 2016 and is currently in storage at the Silver Stream Railway requiring a major overhaul.
- C 864 (Hillside 272/1931) was withdrawn in 1968 but remained stored at Linwood locomotive depot until 1971 when it was purchased for preservation by the NZR&LS Canterbury Branch. It was trucked to Ferrymead in 1972 and entered service there as one of two steam locomotives in regular service, the other being a small Manning, Wardle 0-4-0ST saddle tank locomotive built in 1914.
  Overhauled in 1982, C 864 returned to service in 1984 and made several mainline trips to Rangiora and Lyttelton as part of the Rail 125 celebrations in 1988. Currently, C 864 is out of service and stored in the locomotive shed at Moorhouse station on the Ferrymead Railway. Its boiler certificate expired in 1994 and will require new tyres and tender repairs according to the Canterbury Railway Society website.

== See also ==
- C class of 1873
- Locomotives of New Zealand
