= NZR C class (1873) =

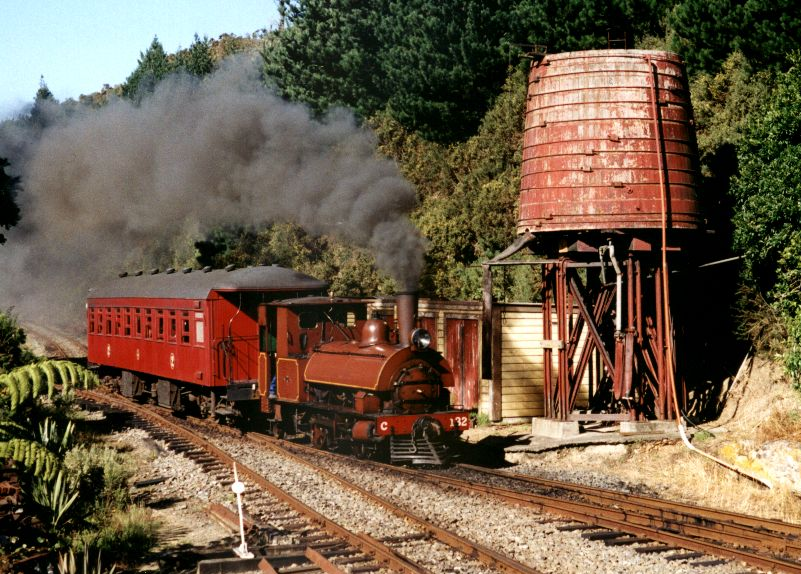
- C class loco 132 on the Silver Stream Railway, 6 March 2002
Type and origin
- Power type: Steam
- Builder: Dübs & Co. (6), Neilson & Co. (10)
- Serial number: Dübs 800–804, 885, Neilson 1764–1773
- Build date: 1873–1875
- Total produced: 16
Specifications
- Configuration
  - Whyte: Originally 0-4-0ST; Rebuilt 0-4-2ST
- Gauge: 3 ft 6 in (1,067 mm)
- Driver dia.: 2 ft 6 in (0.762 m)
- Wheelbase: Coupled: 6 ft 0 in (1.83 m), Total: 13 ft 0 in (3.96 m)
- Length: 21 ft 2 3/4 in (6.47 m)
- Adhesive weight: 14.20 long tons (14.43 t; 15.90 short tons)
- Loco weight: 15.7 long tons (16.0 t; 17.6 short tons)
- Fuel type: Coal
- Fuel capacity: 0.45 long tons (0.46 t; 0.50 short tons)
- Water cap.: 300 imperial gallons (1,400 L; 360 US gal)
- Firebox
  - Grate area: 7.3 sq ft (0.68 m^{2})
- Boiler pressure: 120–140 lbf/in^{2} (0.83–0.97 MPa)
- Heating surface: 392 sq ft (36.4 m^{2})
- Cylinders: Two, outside
- Cylinder size: 9.5 in × 18 in (241 mm × 457 mm)
Performance figures
- Tractive effort: 5,198 lbf (23.12 kN)
Career
- Operators: New Zealand Railways
- Locale: All of New Zealand
- Disposition: Two preserved, remainder scrapped.

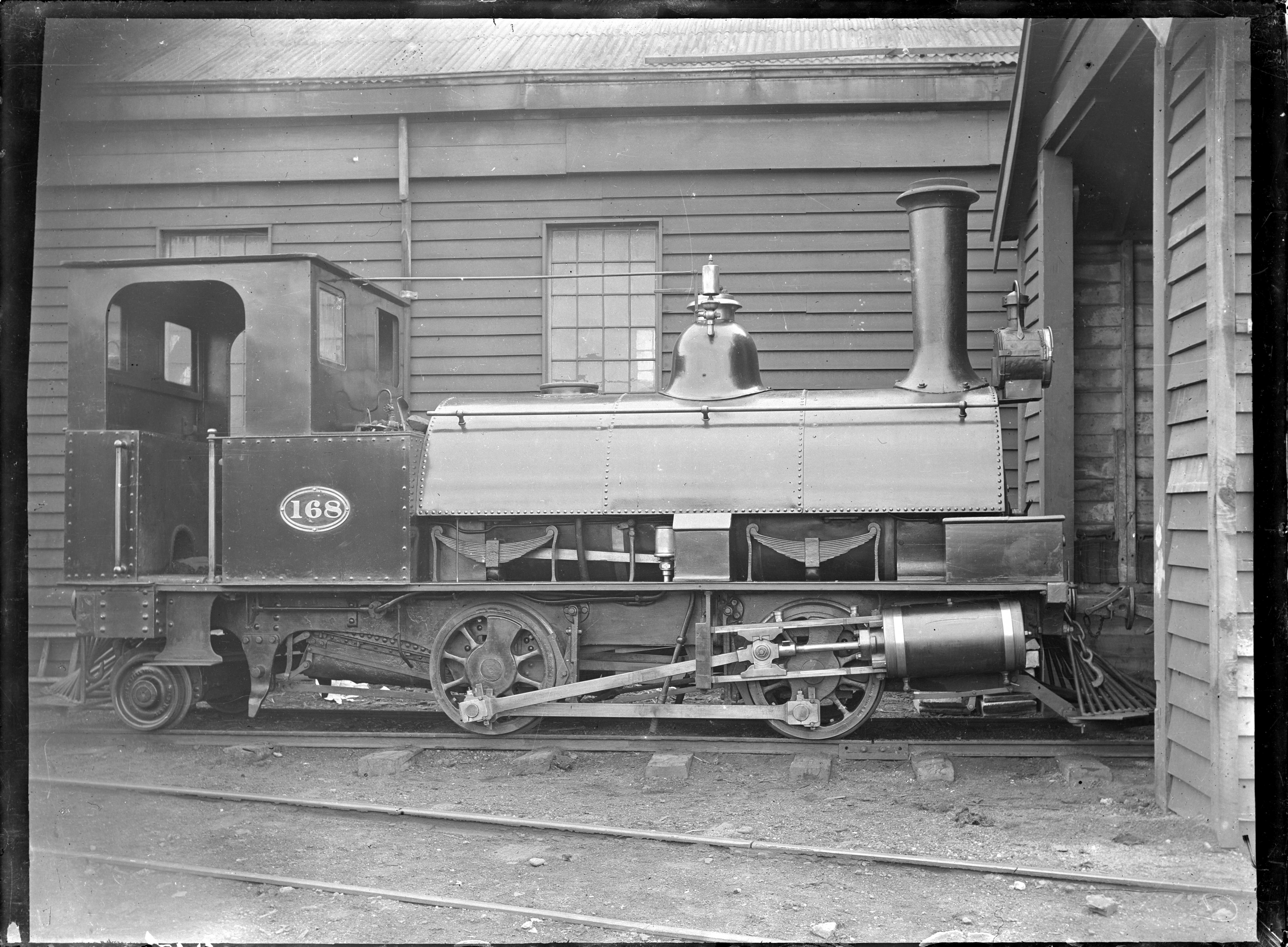
C class steam locomotive, New Zealand Railways number 168 (0-4-2T). ATLIB 276275

The NZR C class tank locomotives operated on New Zealand's national rail network during its infancy. They are sometimes referred to as the little C class or the original C class to distinguish them from the C class of 1930.

== Introduction ==
With the construction of a national network under Julius Vogel's "Great Public Works" scheme came the requirement of motive power. Train sizes at the time were small and the terrain was difficult, so the C class was ordered, ten from Neilson and Company and six from Dübs and Company. The initial duties were to aid in the construction of lines, where the wheel arrangement of 0-4-0 and the light-weight were a particular asset.

Once main lines were open, the class was utilized to haul general freight and passenger trains, but it was quickly superseded by new locomotives that were larger and more powerful, with greater coal and water capacity. The class was found to be unstable at speeds higher than 15 mph (24 km/h), and by 1880 all had been converted to 0-4-2 wheel arrangement.

== Numbering ==
The class was numbered between C 1 and C 577. Numbering was often illogical, and locomotives changed numbers multiple times, partly because the railway network consisted of many isolated sections using different numbering schemes. As the class was used all around the country, from the Kumeu-Riverhead Section north of Auckland to the under-construction Seddonville Branch in Westland, they acquired a range of numbers. Sometimes a locomotive on one section would have the same number as a locomotive on another, or when a locomotive was transferred to a new section it received a new number in line with that section's numbering scheme. When standard nationwide numbering was introduced, numbers were modified again.

== Withdrawal and preservation ==
By the start of the 20th century, some of the class, too small for the national network, had been sold to operators of private industrial lines. By the early 1920s, all had been sold, and many were used on industrial lines and bush tramways for many decades. Their small size was a considerable asset, and C 132 survived long enough to be saved for preservation. It operated on the Silver Stream Railway until December 2008 when it was taken out of service for a major overhaul. Another C, Dübs 803, was recovered in 1993, from where it had been dumped in the Buller Gorge, Westland and was with the Westport Railway Preservation Society, whose goal was to return it to operating condition. It was moved from Westport to the National Railway Museum of New Zealand in 2024.

== See also ==
- NZR A class (1873)
- NZR D class (1874)
- NZR P class (1876)
- Locomotives of New Zealand
