= NZR P class (1876) =

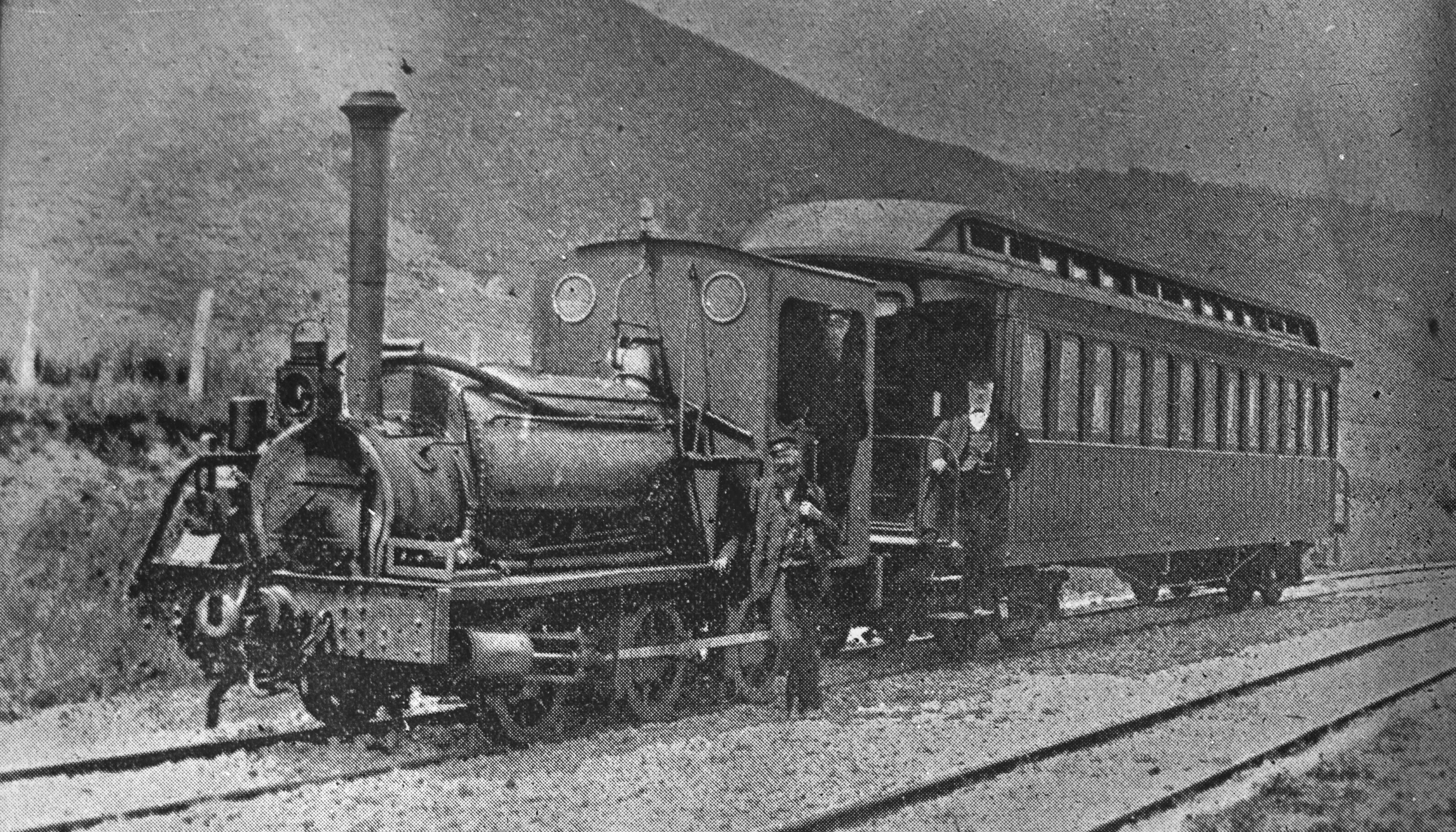
- Weka
Type and origin
- Builder: Davidson
- Build date: 1876
- Total produced: 2
Specifications
- Configuration
  - Whyte: 0-6-0ST
- Gauge: 3 ft 6 in (1,067 mm)
- Driver dia.: 28 in (0.711 m)
- Loco weight: 12 long tons (12.2 tonnes; 13.4 short tons)
- Fuel type: Coal
- Firebox
  - Grate area: 3.5 sq ft (0.33 m^{2})
- Boiler pressure: 120 lbf/in^{2} (827 kPa)
- Heating surface: 161 sq ft (15.0 m^{2})
- Cylinders: Two, outside
- Cylinder size: 8 in × 15 in (203 mm × 381 mm)
Performance figures
- Tractive effort: 3,328 lbf (14.80 kN)
Career
- Operators: NZR

The NZR P class was a class of two 0-6-0ST locomotives built to work on the government-owned national rail network of New Zealand in 1876. They were initially ordered by the Otago Provincial Council, but they were soon incorporated into the national locomotive fleet when the provinces were abolished. Other examples of the P class were built for industrial service and never came under the ownership of the New Zealand Railways Department, though one worked on the Kaitangata Line.

== History ==
The two P class locomotives owned by the Railways Department were known as Kiwi and Weka and they soon passed to the ownership of others, allowing the P classification to be used again in 1885. Weka was the first to leave the ownership of the Railways Department in 1882, when it was acquired by the Wellington and Manawatu Railway Company, who used it for construction and maintenance purposes until 1898. It then came into the possession of the Manawatu County Council's Sanson Tramway, who operated it until 1922, when it passed into the ownership of Mangawhero Sawmilling Co at Karioi and was ultimately scrapped in 1932. Kiwi left the Railways Department's ownership a few years after Weka, just before the arrival of the second P class in 1885. It worked for a number of sawmilling companies throughout the North Island for over half a century, but was derelict in 1956.

== See also ==
- NZR A class (1873)
- NZR C class (1873)
- NZR D class (1874)
- NZR P class (1885)
- Locomotives of New Zealand
