= NZR A class (1873) =

Class of New Zealand steam locomotives

New Zealand A class (1873)
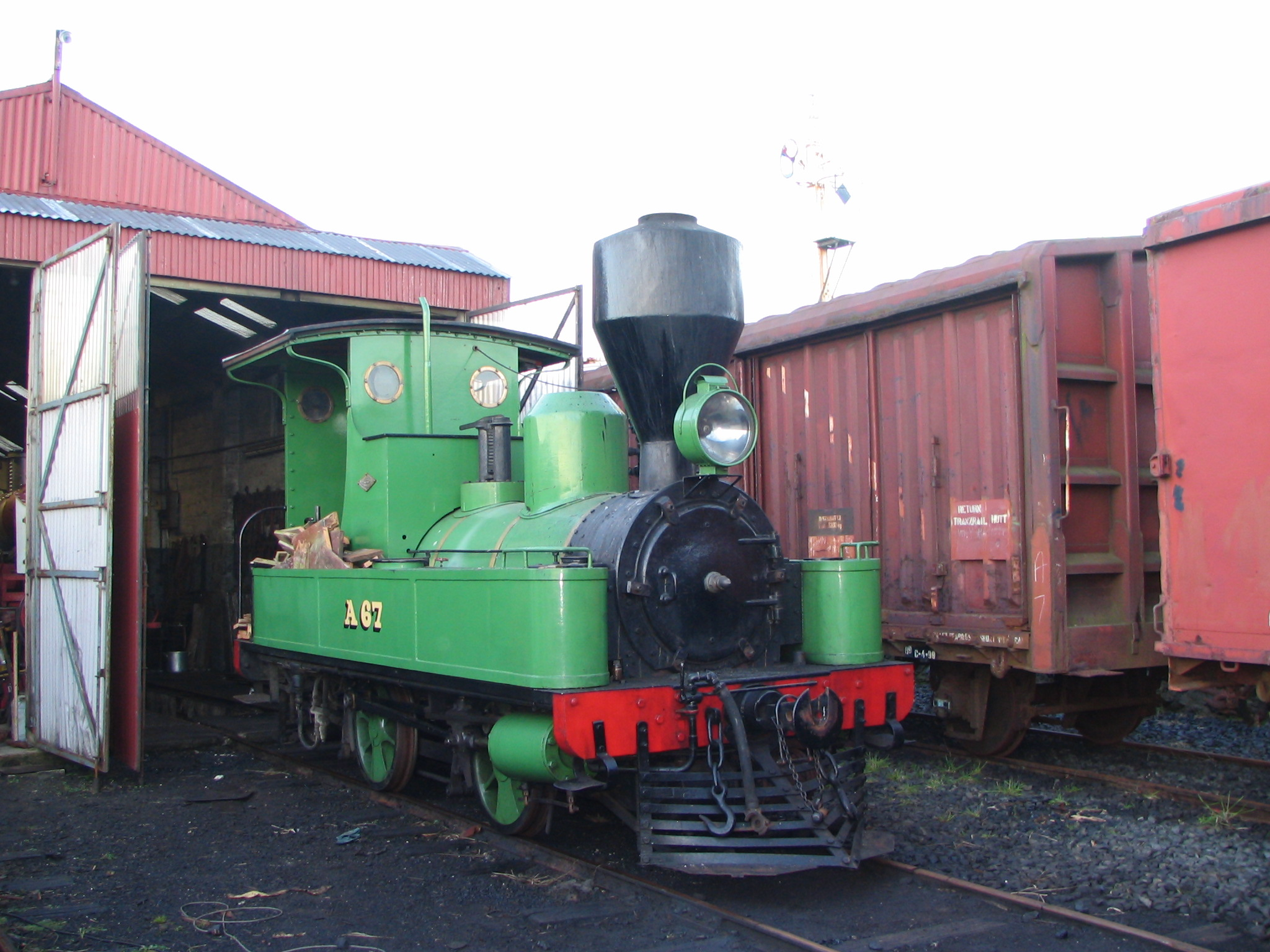
- A67 at Ocean Beach Railway in August 2007.
Type and origin
- Power type: Steam
- Builder: Dübs & Co. (12), Yorkshire Engine Company (2)
- Build date: 1873 (12), 1875 (2)
Specifications
- Configuration
  - Whyte: 0-4-0T
- Gauge: 3 ft 6 in (1,067 mm)
- Driver dia.: 30 in (762 mm)
- Wheelbase: 5 ft 7 in (1,702 mm)
- Length: 18 ft 0 in (5,486 mm)
- Loco weight: 11 long tons (11.2 tonnes; 12.3 short tons)
- Fuel type: Coal
- Fuel capacity: 0.4 long tons (0.45 short tons; 0.41 tonnes)
- Water cap.: 330 imperial gallons (400 US gallons; 1,500 litres)
- Firebox
  - Grate area: 4.2 sq ft (0.39 m^{2})
- Boiler pressure: 120 psi (827 kPa)
- Heating surface: 269 sq ft (25.0 m^{2})
- Cylinders: Two, outside
- Cylinder size: 8 in × 15 in (203 mm × 381 mm)
Performance figures
- Tractive effort: 3,072 lbf (13.7 kN)
Career
- Operators: Public Works Department, NZGR
- Number in class: 19
- Locale: New Zealand
- Preserved: Six (Opossum, Skunk, 62, 64, 66, 67)
- Disposition: Six preserved, thirteen scrapped

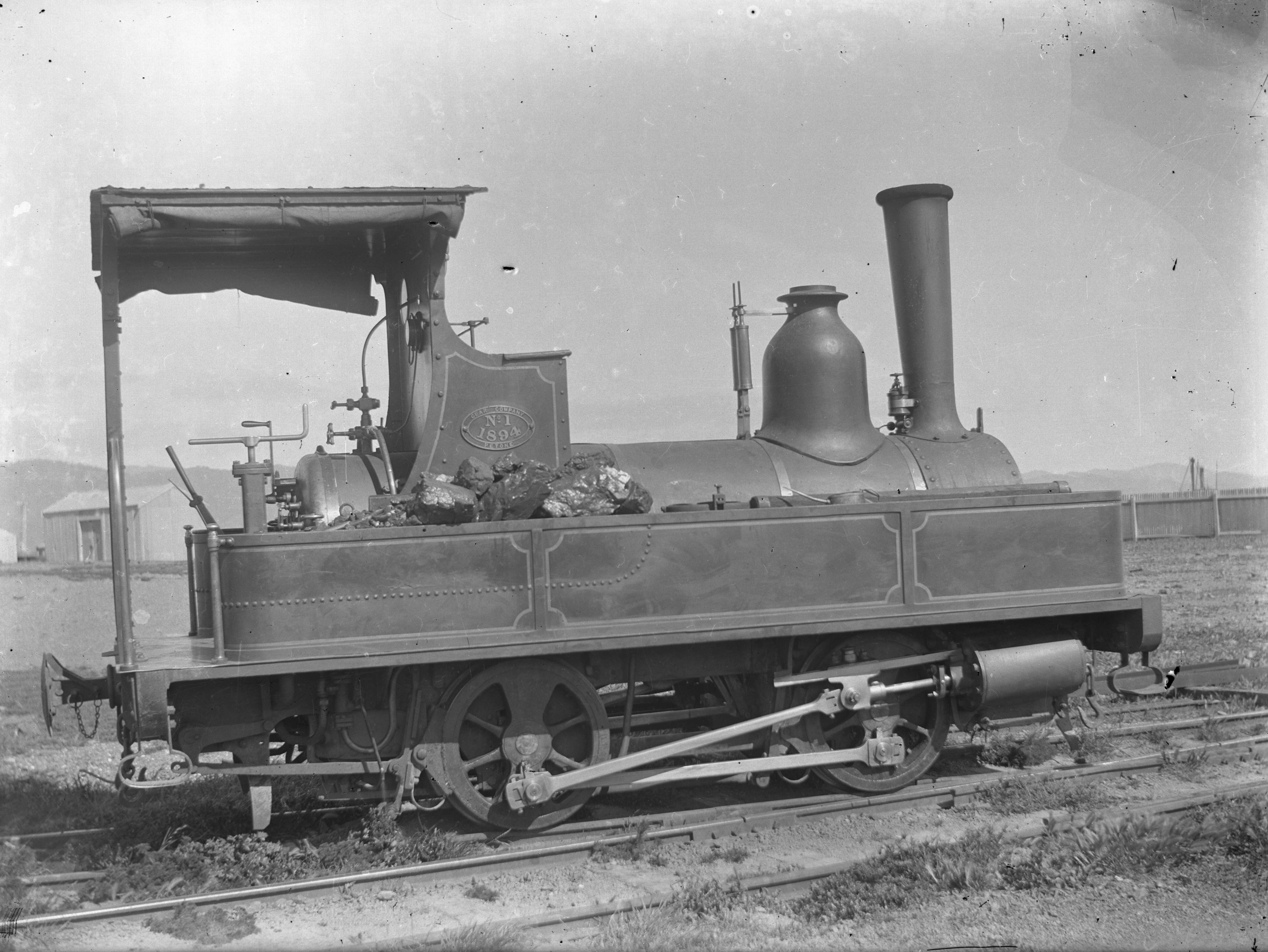
"A" Class steam locomotive, Gear Company locomotive no. 1 (0-4-0 type)

The NZR A class of 1873 consisted of three types of steam locomotives used on New Zealand's railway network of similar specification but differing detail. The first and most numerous were from the Dübs and Company, the next from the Wellington firm E.W. Mills Lion Foundry, and the last from the Scottish firm of Shanks. The specifications are for the Dübs/Yorkshire engines.

== Dubs ==
The A class was the second class of steam locomotive (after 1872's F class) ordered to work on New Zealand's national railways. Initially ordered by the Public Works Department for use in the construction of lines in Canterbury and Taranaki, the A class was a small tank locomotive with a wheel arrangement of 0-4-0T. An initial twelve were constructed by Dübs and Company in 1873 and two more were built in 1875 by Yorkshire Engine Company. They were not just used by the Public Works Department; the New Zealand Government Railways also utilised the class to operate revenue services on smaller branch lines. Quickly outmoded for use on the lines they helped build, only one (A62) remained in government service by 1905, used on the Piha Tramway and later on NZR's Stores Branch Piha Tramway. By 1906 all Dubs A class locomotives were out of service for NZR.

Their small size made them perfect for use on bush tramways and small private industrial sidings. Many members of the class survived for decades in private use, and although all are now retired from commercial service, four have survived to be preserved by railway enthusiasts and two of the four are currently in fully operational condition. One of these preserved locomotives, A 67, was the first in a cavalcade of locomotives at the celebration of the hundredth birthday of the Dunedin Railway Station.

== Mills ==
A batch of A class engines, with differing external details, was built at Wellington by E.W. Mills' Lion Foundry in 1873, for use on the Foxton Section. These appear to be the first NZR locomotives actually built in the country. Like other so-called contractors engines, they were quickly outmoded for line haulage and were sold to industrial operators. "Opossum" was sold in 1877 and served industrial and timber companies for eight decades. The other two were likewise sold by 1885. It was long believed that Opossum was the only one remaining until "Skunk" was discovered and recovered on a beach in Whanganui in October 2025.

== Shanks ==
A further batch was built by Alexander Shanks and Company, of Arbroath, Scotland in 1876 on behalf of the Otago Provincial Council for construction work on the Riverton and Otautau lines in Southland. Both were sold by 1882 and one, named "Mouse", spent the next four decades in the local timber industry. The other went to similar work in Westland.

== Didos ==
The term "Dido", as applying to New Zealand shunting locomotives, can be traced back to the small A class. Crew members from the ship Dido, moored at Bluff Harbour, in May, 1875 were looking for a night on the town, while in port. They took a small 4-wheeled rail trolley and taking turns, both rode and pushed the trolley into Invercargill. When the southern enginemen saw the first A class locomotive arrive for use as a shunter, the name "Dido" was given as a nickname because of its diminutive size. This size led British journalist Charles Rous-Marten to describe them as "a most absurd dwarf".

== Preservation ==
Four Dubs built locomotives and two Mills built locomotives have survived, and two are currently in operating condition. These are:

- A64 is owned by the Plains Vintage Railway in Ashburton, South Canterbury and is the second oldest running locomotive in New Zealand. In 1988, it participated in Ferrymead 125. Currently in operation
- A67 is owned by the Ocean Beach Railway in Dunedin. It participated in the hundredth birthday of Dunedin Station. Currently in operation.

On static display or awaiting restoration are:

- "Opossum" is owned by Shantytown Heritage Park in Greymouth. It is on static display.
- "Skunk" resides at Steam Rail Whanganui after it was recently discovered on a beach. It is in the stages of gathering money to cosmetically restore it.
- A62 is owned by the Packard Motoring Museum. It was the last A class locomotive to be withdrawn, and it was purchased for preservation in 1958. It is on static display at the Packard Motoring Museum in Maungatapere, Northland
- A66 is owned by the Ocean Beach Railway in Dunedin. It currently resides at the Waimea Plains Railway

== See also ==
- NZR C class (1873)
- NZR D class (1874)
- NZR P class (1876)
- Locomotives of New Zealand
