= NZR D class (1929) =

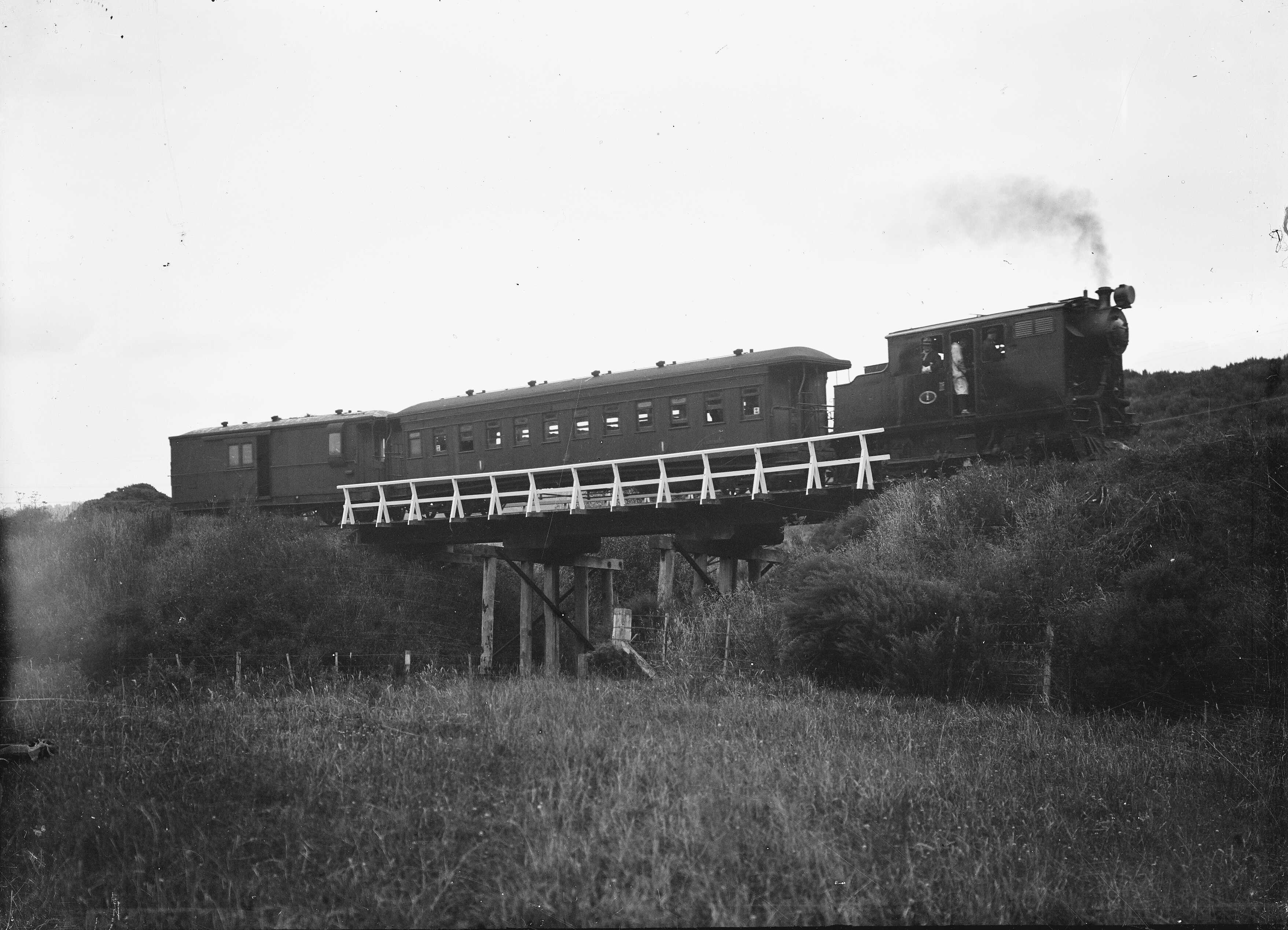
- Trial run of Clayton D class locomotive No 1 at Silverstream
Type and origin
- Builder: Clayton(1)
- Build date: 1929
Specifications
- Configuration
  - Whyte: 0-4-0
- Driver dia.: 42
- Loco weight: 25.7 long tons (26.1 t; 28.8 short tons)
- Firebox
  - Grate area: 12.5 sq ft (1.16 m^{2})
- Boiler pressure: 300 lbf/in^{2} (2.07 MPa)
- Heating surface: 320 sq ft (30 m^{2})
- Cylinders: 4, vertical
- Cylinder size: 7 in × 10 in (178 mm × 254 mm)
Career
- Operators: NZR
- Disposition: Scrapped

The NZR D class of 1929 comprised one 0-4-0 tank locomotive that was built for the New Zealand Railways Department by the Clayton Wagons Ltd in Lincoln, England.

== History ==
D 1 was purchased for railcar-type service, but it was not successful. It had a White-Forster type boiler designed for a working pressure of 300 psi (2,068 kPa), had four vertical cylinders housed in the rear of the cab and was high geared. At a normal engine speed of 400 rpm, the unit was calculated to develop 200 horsepower (150 kW). The engine drove a central transverse jackshaft through reduction gearing, the drive from the jackshaft being transmitted to the wheels through conventional side rods.

== In service ==
On arrival in New Zealand, D 1 was found to be more than 25 per cent heavier than the specified maximum of 20 long tons (20.3 t; 22.4 short tons) and, after trials in Wellington was allocated for use as a shunting engine at the Otahuhu Workshops in 1931. It never proved satisfactory and was written off in 1936 and scrapped. Its boiler was later installed at the Wellington car yards to supply heating steam to passenger carriages between duties.

== Notes and references ==
=== References ===
- Millar, Sean (2011). The NZR Steam Locomotive. Wellington: New Zealand Railway and Locomotive Society. ISBN 978-0-908573-89-9.
- Palmer, A. N.; Stewart, W. W. (1965). Cavalcade of New Zealand Locomotives. Wellington: A H. & A W. Reed. ISBN 978-0-207-94500-7.
- Stewart, W. W. (1974). When Steam was King. Wellington: A. H. & A. W. Reed Ltd. ISBN 978-0-589-00382-1.
