= NZR E class (1906) =

New Zealand E class locomotive (1906)
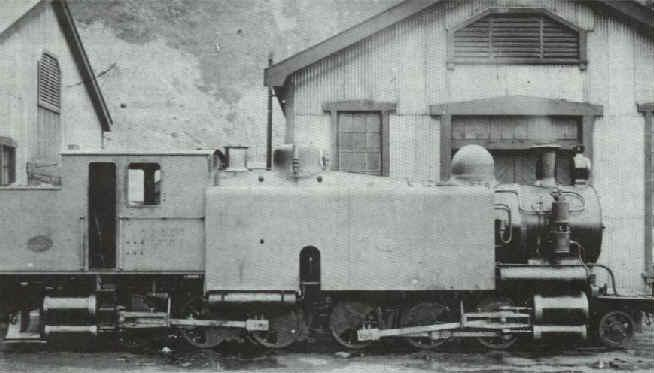
- E 66 at Petone Workshops in February 1906, just after it was built.
Type and origin
- Power type: Steam
- Builder: New Zealand Railways Department, Petone Workshops.
- Serial number: 69
- Build date: 1906
- Total produced: 1
Specifications
- Configuration
  - Whyte: 2-6-6-0T
- Gauge: 3 ft 6 in (1,067 mm)
- Driver dia.: 36.5 in (0.927 m)
- Length: 37 ft 2 in (11.33 m) over couplers
- Adhesive weight: 61 long tons 2 cwt (136,900 lb or 62.1 t); 61 long tons 2 cwt (62.1 t; 68.4 short tons)
- Loco weight: 65 long tons 16 cwt (147,400 lb or 66.9 t); 65 long tons 16 cwt (66.9 t; 73.7 short tons)
- Fuel type: Coal
- Fuel capacity: 3 long tons 4 cwt (7,200 lb or 3.3 t); 3 long tons 4 cwt (3.3 t; 3.6 short tons)
- Water cap.: 1,250 imp gal (5,700 L; 1,500 US gal)
- Firebox
  - Grate area: 26.0 sq ft (2.42 m^{2})
- Boiler pressure: 200 lbf/in^{2} (1,400 kPa; 14 kgf/cm^{2})
- Heating surface: 1,540 sq ft (143 m^{2})
- Cylinders: 4 HP, 4 LP, Vauclain compound
- High-pressure cylinder: 9.5 in × 18 in (241 mm × 457 mm)
- Low-pressure cylinder: 16 in × 18 in (406 mm × 457 mm)
Performance figures
- Tractive effort: 24,200 lbf (108 kN)
Career
- Operators: NZGR
- Numbers: E 66
- Nicknames: Pearson's Dream
- First run: 1906
- Withdrawn: 1917
- Disposition: Scrapped

The New Zealand E class locomotive comprised a single Mallet steam locomotive operated by New Zealand Railways (NZR) from 1906 until 1917. Classified as E 66 and nicknamed Pearson's Dream after its designer, it was an experimental Mallet locomotive designed to work on the Rimutaka Incline. The "E" classification was previously used by the Double Fairlie E class of 1872-75, but the classification was free as they had all been withdrawn by the time E 66 entered service. After the withdrawal of E 66, "E" was again re-used on the battery-electric E class of 1922. It was the only Mallet locomotive to operate for the NZR

== Origin and design ==
The Rimutaka Incline opened in 1878, connecting Wellington with the Wairarapa region, and with the completion of the Wairarapa Line in December 1897, it provided NZR's main link to the north as the west coast route was then privately owned by the Wellington and Manawatu Railway Company (WMR). Six special Fell locomotives, the H class, worked the Incline, but after 1897, traffic increases necessitated additional motive power. Initially, two members of the B class were converted from tender locomotives into tank locomotives and reclassified as the W^{E} class; W 192 was also transferred to assist on the Incline. These locomotives proved to be more expensive to operate and used more fuel than the H class. However, they were considered successful enough by the Chief Mechanical Engineer A. L. Beattie that he authorised his Chief Draughtsman, G. A. Pearson, to design another, more powerful locomotive to work the Incline.

To meet Beattie's requirements, Pearson designed E 66 as a Mallet articulated locomotive with a wheel arrangement of 2-6-6-0T under the Whyte notation system. Its cylinders were placed at each end instead of one wheelset behind the other allowing one set to be driving forward at all times. It was a Vauclain compound, re-using materials left over from an unsuccessful experiment in the 1890s on N 27. This compounding encouraged the use of a then remarkably high boiler pressure, 200 psi, which in turn caused the use of a corrugated furnace for strength. (Note: see Vanderbilt boiler) This also provided a clear space below the boiler, allowing room for the rear power bogie. The restricted grate area of such a furnace though may have been the cause of some of the steaming problems. The locomotive also used other surplus materials, such as modified F class wheels. The locomotive was built at the Petone Railway Workshops in the Hutt Valley under Pearson's direct supervision and entered service on 23 February 1906.

== Rimutaka Incline service ==
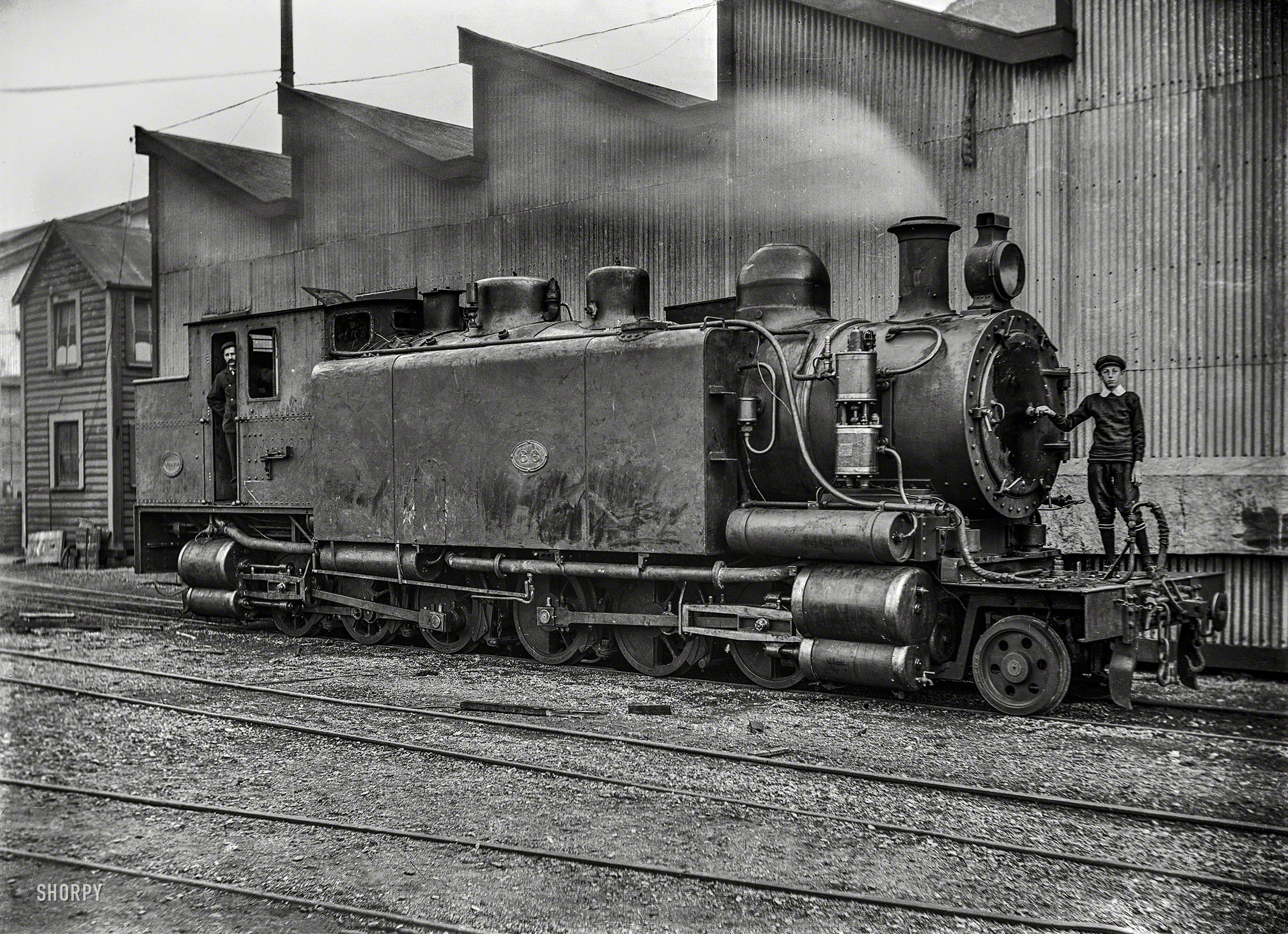
E class locomotive E 66 at the Petone Railway Workshops

In a trial between Upper Hutt railway station and Summit railway station, the non-Incline portion of the route over the Rimutaka Range, E 66 successfully hauled forty-five wagons up the 1 in 35 grade. This was the equivalent of a load that would have required two W^{F} class locomotives. The locomotive soon began work on the Incline as intended and was based at Cross Creek railway station at the foot of the Incline. It was rated to haul up to 80 tons on the Incline, 15 tons higher than the maximum permitted of the H class, and in a trial it successfully hauled 103 tons from Cross Creek up to Summit. However, it was much more costly to operate than the H class and thus ran only two-thirds the annual mileage of the H locomotives. E 66 consumed 167 pounds of coal per mile, while an H class used 117 pounds, and its operating cost was 54.10 pence per mile compared to 37.73 pence for an H. Furthermore, E 66's crews complained of excessive heat in the cab, especially through tunnels, and firemen had to wear heat-resistant asbestos pants due to the excessive heat.

== Transfer and withdrawal ==
In December 1908, the WMR was purchased by NZR and its Wellington - Manawatu Line was incorporated into the national network as part of the North Island Main Trunk Railway (NIMT). Most traffic from beyond the Wairarapa was re-routed via the old WMR route as it was quicker and did not include the time-consuming Incline. Accordingly, by 1909, traffic over the Incline was in decline and primarily served the Wairarapa. The traffic volumes thus became manageable for the H locomotives alone, and E 66 was transferred from Cross Creek to Wellington despite its moderate success on the Incline. The NIMT contained a steeply graded section between Wellington and Johnsonville (now truncated as the Johnsonville Branch due to the Tawa Flat deviation) and E 66 was used to bank trains over this route. However, it had not been designed for this work and became unpopular with crews. Due to these problems, it did not meet the designer's ambitions and thus acquired the "Pearson's Dream" nickname.

Due to its unpopularity in Wellington and increasing tonnages over the Incline due to World War I, E 66 was transferred back to Cross Creek in 1916. However, it was only in steam 23 days that year, sometimes for works trains rather than revenue service, and operated over a distance of just 478 miles. In May 1917, it was withdrawn from service, stored, and then dismantled. Its boiler was transferred to Auckland for use as a depot wash-out boiler and used in this capacity until 1931 when it was condemned and dumped. The locomotive thus did not survive to be preserved. It was still recalled as a hated locomotive in 1955 at a Cross Creek reunion.
