= Silver Stream Railway =

Heritage railway near Wellington, New Zealand

Coordinates: 41.150864°S 174.994946°E

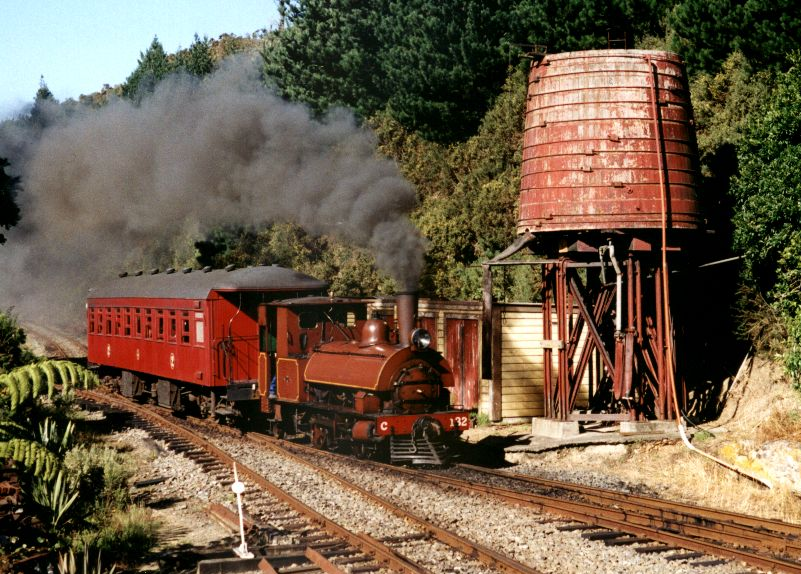
- A steam train on the Silver Stream Railway, 6 March 2002. The locomotive is C 132.
- Locale: Upper Hutt, Wellington, New Zealand

Commercial operations
- Name: Part of the Hutt Valley Line
- Built by: New Zealand Government Railways
- Original gauge: 3 ft 6 in (1,067 mm)

Preserved operations
- Preserved gauge: 1,067 mm (3 ft 6 in)

Commercial history
- Opened: 15 December 1875
- Closed: 21 November 1954

Preservation history
- Reopened: 15 February 1986.

Silver Stream Railway is a heritage railway at Silverstream in the Hutt Valley near Wellington, New Zealand. It regularly operates preserved New Zealand Railways Department locomotives along a restored section of the Hutt Valley Line (part of the Wairarapa Line) before a deviation was built in 1954.

== History ==
The beginnings of Silver Stream Railway were in 1967 when the Wellington branch of the New Zealand Railway and Locomotive Society began a collection of locomotives and rolling stock. Tracklaying on the old formation of the Hutt Valley Line did not begin until 1977. The collection of locomotives and rolling stock had previously been stored at a site by the Gracefield Branch in Seaview, and this was transferred to the present Silverstream site in 1984. The official opening of the full 1.5-kilometre (0.93 mi) track took place on 15 February 1986.

== List of locomotives ==
Key:	In Service	In Service, Main Line Certified	Under Overhaul/Restoration	Stored	Static Display	Scrapped

Number	Builder	Builder's Number	Year built	Acquired by Silver Stream	Notes
D 143	Neilson & Co.	1847	1874	1916	Previously in use at Portland Cement, Portland. Originally named Trout. Stored awaiting future restoration.
Ww 571	NZR Hillside.	147	1914	1969	Operated at SSR 1988–2006. Stored awaiting future restoration.
C 132	Dubs & Co.	885	1875	1885	Previously owned by NZ Mines Department, Rotowaro. Originally named Pounamu. Wore a brown livery since restoration, until used in filming of "The Last Samurai" where it was painted black. Black livery kept since. Withdrawn from service 2008 for comprehensive overhaul.
D 137	Scott Brothers	31	1887	1901	Displayed in a park after finishing service with Gear Meat in Petone. Then to Silver Stream Railway, stored.
L 509	Avonside Engineering Co.	1207	1877	?	After NZR use, was sold to Public Works Department for construction work. Was used to construct the NIMT and was used on the Parliamentary Special, 1908. Previously at Portland Cement, Portland before being acquired by Silver Stream Railway. Used in Centennial recreation of the Parliamentary Special, 2008. It was taken out of service in 2019 and it currently being overhauled.
Eb26	Goodman Manufacturing Company.		1929	2015	Originally built as a battery electric and later converted to diesel-electric. Used at Hutt Workshops and later Napier Workshop before moving to Pandora Diesel Depot. Withdrawn in 1998 and sold to private individuals who performed a major restoration. Gifted to SSR 2014 and moved to the railway August 2015. In Service.
P.W.D 531	Andrew Barclay Sons and Company.	1749	1921	?	Entered Service 2012. Leased from Hawkes Bay Steam Society.
Gear Meat No.3	Andrew Barclay Sons and Company.	1335	1913	1989	Bought new for Gear Meat, Petone. Withdrawn 1965 and displayed at Avalon Park, until 1989 when moved to Silver Stream Railway where it was plinthed at the entrance. Moved into storage 17 July 2010.
	Andrew Barclay Sons and Company.	1181	1909	1963	Bought new for Wellington Meat Export Company. Withdrawn 1962 and stored at Southwards Engineering, until 1979 when moved to Steam Incorporated where restoration commenced in 1996. Sold to new owners and moved to Silver Stream Railway 2013 for restoration and operation.
C 847	NZR Hillside Workshops.	255	1930	1968	One of the last C class in service. Stored at Silver Stream until 1990 when moved to Glenbrook Vintage Railway for restoration. Restored to "Wellington" style appearance, certified for main line running and leased to Railway Enthusiasts Society 1994–98. It was taken out of service in 2016 and is awaiting an overhaul.
Rm 30	NZR Hutt		1930	1972	Standard Railcar. Named Aotea. Holds NIMT end-to-end speed record. In service.
Rm 34	NZR Hutt		1930	1972	Standard Railcar. Named Tainui. Interior under restoration. Gifted to the Pahiatua Railcar Society in 2019.
BP Shunter	Planet	2166	1939	1969	Built for BP Oil, Gracefield. To Silver Stream Railway 1969. Scrapped 2015.
K^{A} 935	NZR Hutt Workshops	318	1941	1968	Last K^{A} in NZR service. Purchased by the NZR&LS Wellington Branch, stored temporarily at Te Awamutu Railway Museum before moving to Seaview. Regularly run at Seaview. Has seen occasional use at Silver Stream. Awaiting overhaul.
DE 505	English Electric Co.	1743	1951	1984	One of first DE Class locomotives withdrawn. In Service.
DE 508	English Electric Co.	1746	1951	2003	Formerly part of Tranz Rail Heritage Collection. To Silver Stream Railway via Rail Heritage Trust, 2003.
Price 221	A & G Price	221	1968	2000	Built for NZ Steel, Mission Bush. To Silver Stream Railway 2000.

== Rolling stock ==
The railway owns an assortment of rolling stock, some in operational condition while others are awaiting or under restoration. The railway has a wide selection of rolling stock and some of the items are rather rare. One of the most notable items of rolling stock was a 50' passenger carriage of the Wellington and Manawatu Railway (WMR), No. 52, later NZR A 1130. This carriage has now passed to the NZR&LS at their North End shed where it resides with two other former WMR 50' carriages, No. 42 (NZR A 1120) and No.48 (NZR A 1126). Carriages 48 and 52 are undergoing extensive restoration with 48 nearing completion and 52 currently stripped right down. WMR No. 42 is stored at the North End shed, unrestored.

== List of rolling stock ==
Key:	In Service	In Service, Main Line Certified	Under Overhaul/Restoration	Stored	Static Display	Scrapped

Number	Builder	Year built	Acquired by Silver Stream	Notes
L 4246	NZR Addington.	1897	197?	Restored 2008–2012. Won FRONZ goods wagon restoration award 2013

== Operation ==
Trains run from 11am till 4pm on the 1st and 3rd Sundays of the month for most of the year except June, July, August and December when the railway is only open on the first Sunday of these months. In addition the railway is open on selected public holiday Mondays and is available for private charters throughout the year. There are several special event days held during the year, where multiple trains are run, and visitors are offered the opportunity to look behind the scenes in the railways workshop and at other locomotives and rolling stock on display.
