= New Zealand E class locomotive (1922) =

New Zealand E class (1922)
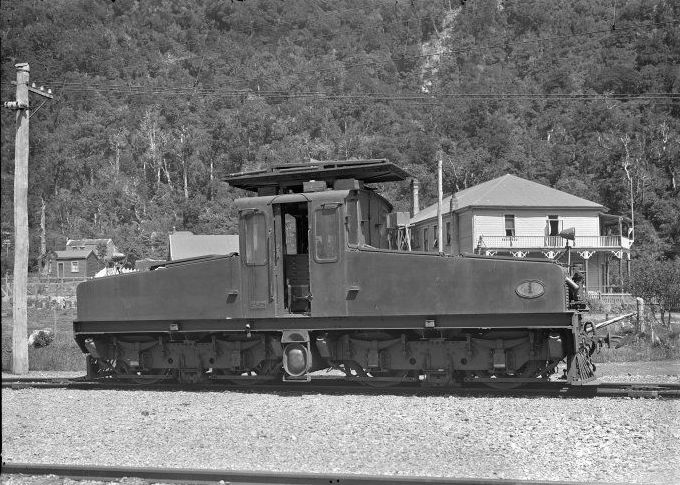
- E class no 1, battery-electric locomotive, between 1921-1930. A P Godber Collection, Alexander Turnbull Library.
Type and origin
- Power type: Battery electric
- Builder: English Electric
- Build date: 1922
- Total produced: 1
Specifications
- Configuration
  - Whyte: 0-4-0 + 04-0
  - UIC: Bo'Bo'
- Gauge: 3 ft 6 in (1,067 mm)
- Total weight: 54 long tons (60 short tons; 55 t)
Performance figures
- Maximum speed: 10 mph (16 km/h)
- Power output: 176 hp (131 kW)
- Tractive effort: 6,200 lbf (28 kN)
Career
- Operators: New Zealand Government Railways
- Numbers: 1
- Locale: Otira, Midland line
- First run: April 1923
- Last run: 1930
- Disposition: Scrapped.

The New Zealand E class battery-electric locomotive represented the third unique type of locomotive class to be given the E classification in New Zealand. The first was the E class of nine Double Fairlie steam locomotives of 1872-75; the second E class consisted of a Mallet compound made in 1906; and as both were no longer operated by the New Zealand Railways in 1923, the classification was free to be used for a third time when the small battery-electric locomotive was delivered. This is the only time a classification has been used three times in New Zealand, though re-use happened a number of other times, arguably most notably when the A class of 1906 took the designation originally used by the A class of 1873.

== Introduction ==
This particular E class was ordered for service on the newly electrified Otira Tunnel section of the Midland line and was constructed in 1922.

In April 1923, English Electric delivered an order of six locomotives: five EO class mainline locomotives that collected electricity from overhead wires, and E 1, a sixth small battery-electric locomotive for maintenance duties; used in the 1920s.

E 1 had a wheel arrangement of Bo-Bo-2 (including a 4-wheeled battery tender for one battery section) under the UIC classification system. The battery of 216 "Ironclad Exide" cells was of 1,670 ampere hour capacity at a five hour rate of discharge. Power at an average of 400 volts went to four 22 kW (33 kW one hour rating) self-ventilating traction motors on each axle. Four DK 30 self ventilating traction motors were each of 44 hp (33 kW), for a total tractive effort of 6,200 lbf (28 kN) and a maximum speed of 10 mph (16 km/h).

It had a tractive effort of 27.5 kN at one-hour rating, and could haul 40 long tons (45 short tons; 41 t) at 8.5 mph (13.7 km/h) on the gradient of 1 in 33 (3 %) that prevailed between Arthurs Pass and Otira.

Braking was by airbrakes on engine and tender, a tramway type magnetic brake between each wheel set, and a screw type handbrake.

== Withdrawal ==
The locomotive was written off around 1930 due to the costs involved in maintaining its batteries. Instructions were issued for any equipment that could not be re-used elsewhere from the locomotive to be dumped locally. E 1's cab can still be found alongside the track just south of Otira. The runner wagon for E 1 was stripped of its batteries and found use at Addington Workshops as a general-purpose wagon around the complex.
