= NZR DSB class =

New Zealand D^{SB} class
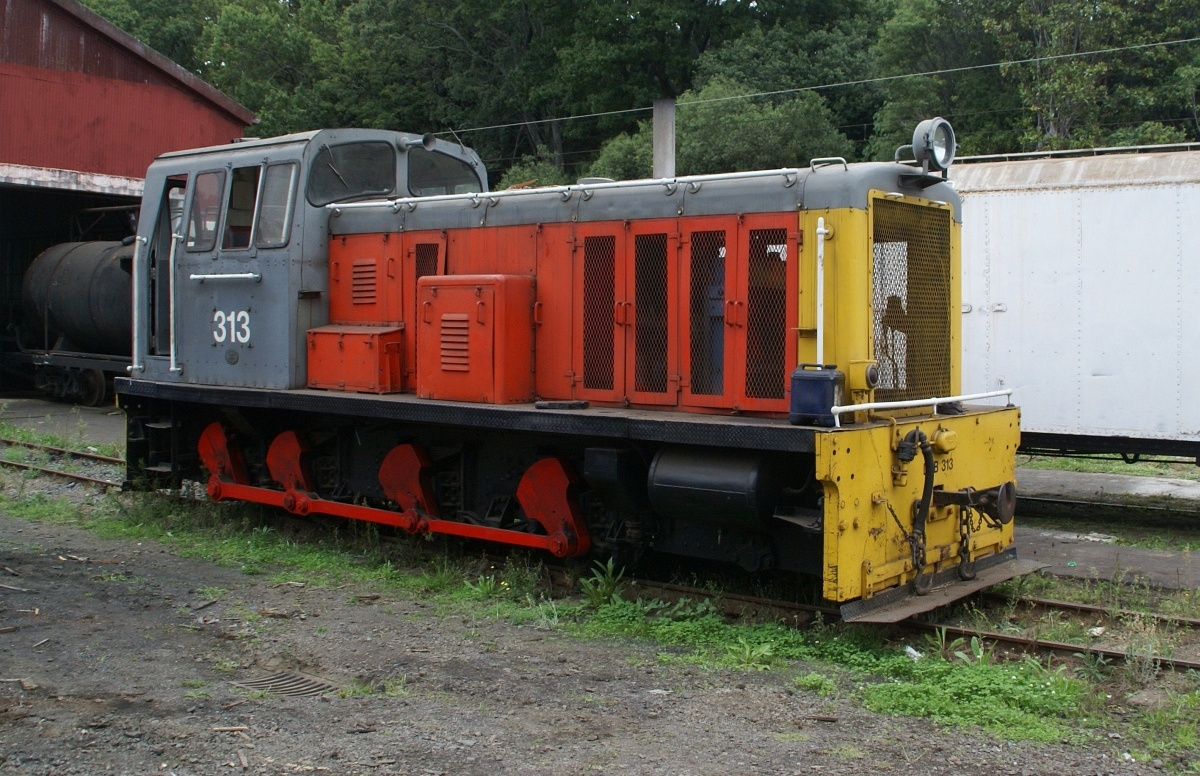
Type and origin
- Power type: Diesel-Mechanical/Hydraulic
- Builder: Drewry Car Co (25), Mitsubishi Heavy Industries (3)
- Build date: 1954-1967
Specifications
- Configuration
  - AAR: 0-6-0
- Gauge: 1,067 mm (3 ft 6 in)
- Length: Drewry: 8.8 m (28 ft 10 in); Mitsubishi:8.5 m (27 ft 11 in)
- Loco weight: 37 tonnes (36 long tons; 41 short tons)
- Prime mover: Drewry: National M4AA7; later: Caterpillar D343TA; Mitsubishi: Caterpillar D343TA
Performance figures
- Maximum speed: Drewry: 39 km/h (24 mph); later: 57 km/h (35 mph); Mitsubishi: 56 km/h (35 mph)
- Power output: 195 kW (261 hp)later: 263 kW (353 hp); Mitsubishi:280 kW (380 hp)
Career
- Operators: NZGR, New Zealand Railways Corporation
- Number in class: 28
- Numbers: TMS numbers: 1003-1290; Road numbers: 300-327
- Locale: All of New Zealand
- First run: August 1954
- Last run: April 1989
- Current owner: Avon Engineering (1), Mainline Steam Heritage Trust (1)
- Disposition: 1 preserved, 27 scrapped

The NZR DSB class locomotive (Note: Following the introduction of TMS in 1979, the class classification was capitalised, whereas previously the second letter was a smaller capital letter, that is D^{SB}) is a type of shunting locomotive introduced to New Zealand's national rail network in 1954 by New Zealand Railways (NZR).

== Introduction ==
In 1950, NZR placed an order for 25 D^{SB} shunting locomotives. They were built by the Drewry Car Co. between 1954 and 1956. The first three D^{SB} class locomotives were commissioned in August 1954. The D^{SB} are a larger and more powerful locomotive than the D^{S} and D^{SA} classes and were used all over New Zealand. A second batch of three locomotives built by Mitsubishi Heavy Industries was introduced in 1967. Included with the three Mitsubishi DSB class were two additional locomotives for the Ohai Railway Board at Ohai, Southland.

The Drewry type B-2 had a cover-plate over the locomotive's jackshaft to prevent staff from being caught by the jackshaft while riding on the cab steps.

By the end of their lives, 12 DSBs were repainted in the "International Orange" livery.

== Withdrawal ==
In line with NZR's policy of rationalising locomotive classes, the DSB class was entirely withdrawn by the end of the 1980s.

As of July 2014 only one DSB class has been preserved, DSB313 was purchased in January 1991 by the Mainline Steam Heritage Trust for shunting at their Parnell depot. However, both of the Ohai Railway Board's DSB-class equivalents No.1 and No.2 have been preserved, No.1 at Ocean Beach Railway, Dunedin, and No.2 at Steam Incorporated, Paekakariki.
