= National Railway Museum of New Zealand =

Museum in New Zealand

Coordinates: 43.5676°S 172.70228°E

The National Railway Museum of New Zealand (NRM) is a museum under construction in Christchurch, New Zealand, that covers the history of the New Zealand railway network. Work is underway to open at Ferrymead Heritage Park in Ferrymead, Christchurch, at the site of New Zealand's first railway opened in 1863.

== Structure and fundraising ==
The museum is owned by an incorporated society, the National Railway Museum of New Zealand Incorporated. The society is a registered charity. Alan Spooner is the current president of the society.

To raise funds, the NRM runs its own bookshop, mainly selling books and magazines relating to railway topics in New Zealand.

== Exhibits ==
The museum owns one electric locomotive from Wellington, one electric multiple unit also from Wellington and three wagons with a leased diesel shunter. The museum will display other NZR and bush locomotives from the Canterbury Railway Society. The museum will also display other rolling stock including a turntable from Auckland and any other suitable railway material. The museum is under construction with the turntable in place. An NZR C class (1873), rescued from a dump in Buller Gorge, was moved from the Westport Railway Preservation Society to NZRM in 2024.

== Locomotives and rolling stock ==
=== Diesel Locomotives ===
Key:	In service	In service, Mainline Certified	Under overhaul/restoration	Stored	Static display	Scrapped

Number	TMS number	Builder	Builder's number	Year built	Arrived	Notes
	DC4876	General Motors Canada	81/1119 (Clyde Engineering makers No.)	1966	2022	Ex-D^{A} 1492. Rebuilt at Clyde Engineering in 1979.
T^{R} 190	TR 943	NZR Hillside Workshops	457	1978	2008	Owned by the Rail Heritage Trust of New Zealand.

=== Electric Locomotives ===
Key:	In service	In service, Mainline Certified	Under overhaul/restoration	Stored	Static display	Scrapped

Number	TMS number	Builder	Year built	Year arrived	Notes
E^{A} 2	EO 45	Toshiba Heavy Industries	1968	2013	

=== Electric multiple units ===
Key:	In service	In service, Mainline Certified	Under overhaul/restoration	Stored	Static display	Scrapped

Number	TMS number	Name	Builder	Builder's number	Year built	Year arrived	Notes
D 162	D 2687	Phoenix	English Electric	1648	1953	2014	

=== Wagons ===
Key:	In service	In service, Mainline Certified	Under overhaul/restoration	Stored	Static display	Scrapped

Number	TMS number	Builder	Year built	Year arrived	Notes
L^{A} 13817		NZR Hillside Workshops	1922	2014	
T 199	T 813	NZR Addington Workshops	1966	2014	
Y^{D} 490	YD 1044	Differential Car Co	1958	2015	Used by the Canterbury Railway Society for work trains.
