= Canterbury Railway Society =

Nee Zealand railway enthusiast organisation

- Type: Railway preservation and historical society
- Industry: Rail transport
- Predecessor: New Zealand Railway and Locomotive Society
- Founded: 1990; 36 years ago
- Headquarters: Canterbury, New Zealand
- Website: www.canterburyrailwaysociety.org.nz

The Canterbury Railway Society is an organisation of railway enthusiasts based in the Canterbury region of New Zealand's South Island, best known for their operation of The Ferrymead Railway at the Ferrymead Heritage Park.

== Beginnings ==
The Canterbury branch of the New Zealand Railway & Locomotive Society was formed in the late 1950s. In its early years, one of its major activities was in the operation of passenger excursions on the national rail network, then operated by the New Zealand Railways Department. In that era, there were far more excursion trains than there are today, and far more railway lines in general, including the many branch lines that were closed in the 1960s and 1970s. Steam traction was used in the South Island for longer than in the North Island, and a variety of motive power could be found on any of these trains.

Aside from a handful of locomotives placed on public display, little thought up to this time had been given to any serious notion of rail preservation. The catalyst proved to be the wholesale scrapping of steam traction which began in the mid 1950s and continued until 1971 when the last J^{A} class locomotives were withdrawn from the Main South Line. In addition at this time, a large number of branch lines were closed and ripped up, and some of the earliest preservation efforts were based on these closed lines, while others took advantage of the opportunity to obtain cheap supplies of recovered rail materials for use elsewhere.

The idea of becoming involved in railway preservation in New Zealand did not become a reality for any group in New Zealand until the 1960s, when New Zealand Railways accelerated the pace of dieselisation, resulting in wholesale scrapping of its steam locomotive fleet. At that time, there was a nationwide move to save railway equipment which resulted in the large-scale purchase of locomotives and rolling stock and the establishment of the major preservation sites in New Zealand.

== Ferrymead Railway ==
The Ferrymead Railway has been the main project of the Canterbury branch since 1964. The railway has been established on the historical site of New Zealand's first public railway which opened in 1863 and closed in 1867. The railway runs from a station at the Ferrymead Heritage Park Edwardian village north-east to a small station alongside the Heathcote River. Work on the site had progressed sufficiently far by 1972 to allow train running to begin, and the railway officially opened in 1977. It was the major focus of 1988's Rail 125 commemorations, a celebration of 125 years of railways in New Zealand, and it has hosted numerous local events since, often in conjunction with the Ferrymead Heritage Park or other rail preservation societies.

== Other activities ==
As noted above, excursion trains were a major early activity of the Canterbury branch. It also held monthly members' meetings, often on railway premises, and organised special conventions and festivals. In the diesel era, the most notable of these was the aforementioned Rail 125. Passenger shuttle services and excursions operated daily throughout the week of this festival, which was attended by locomotives, rolling stock and railfans from all around the country. Following the reintroduction of excursions to the NZR mainline in the late 1970s, the branch or individual members operated a number of diesel hauled trains, and were well placed to take advantage of the reintroduction of mainline steam in the mid 1980s.

Changes in New Zealand Railway & Locomotive Society (NZRLS) membership rules in 1984 resulted in the elimination of membership of Local Branches of the NZRLS. When the requirement for full membership of the parent society began to be enforced there was a move for the Canterbury Branch to follow the lead of the former Auckland, Wellington and Otago branches and form a separate Society. Constitutional amendments were passed in 1990 which resulted in the branch becoming the independent Canterbury Railway Society.

During the 1990s, the restructuring and privatisation of New Zealand Railways had a major impact upon the activities of many rail societies. Excursion train costs rose substantially and the number of such trains operated annually dropped off dramatically. Such trains then became mainly the preserve of two or three larger organisations with their own passenger carriage and/or locomotive fleets. Changes in employment law and working patterns for most New Zealand citizens resulted also in a major reduction in voluntary resources for groups all around the country. In general, this has resulted in most other activities of the Canterbury Railway Society dropping away, and the Society is now exclusively based at Ferrymead and forms most of its activities around the site.

== Locomotives, railcars and rolling stock ==
=== Ex-NZR steam locomotives ===
Key:	In service	In service, Mainline Certified	Under overhaul/restoration	Stored	Static display	Scrapped

Number	Names	Builder	Builders number	Year built	Year arrived	Notes
C 864		NZR Hillside Workshops	272	1931	1972	Purchased in 1971, and arrived in the following year. Operated from 1972 to 1982 when withdrawn for overhaul. Returned to in 1984, and used until 1994 for tender repairs and tyre replacement. Currently in storage.
D 140		Scott Brothers	36	1887	1968	Donated in 1968. Operated 2003 to 2013. Recently returned to service after overhaul.
F 12		Yorkshire Engine Company	241	1874	1968	Purchased in 1967. In storage.
F 13	Peveril	Neilson Brothers	1692	1872	1967	Originally named Edie Ochiltree. Donated in 1967. Recommissioned on 21 April 1984 after overhaul. Withdrawn from service in 1994, and overhauled again from 2006 to 2015. Re-entered service on 5 January 2015, and officially recommissioned on 3 April 2015. It is New Zealand's oldest operating locomotive.
W 192		NZR Addington Workshops	1	1889	2003	Operated from 2003 to 2014. Currently out of service awaiting a 10-year overhaul. Owned by the Rail Heritage Trust.
W^{D} 357		Baldwin Locomotive Works	19261	1901	30 October 1968	Donated in 1967. Restored 1987–88. Operated until 2001. Now stored. First locomotive to run on the Ferrymead Railway.
W^{F} 393		A & G Price	5	1904	1968	Donated in 1968. Currently on static display in the Hall of Wheels at Ferrymead.

=== Ex-Industrial steam locomotives ===
Key:	In service	In service, Mainline Certified	Under overhaul/restoration	Stored	Static display	Scrapped

Type	Names	Builder	Builders number	Year built	Arrived	Notes
Bagnall	The Gasbag	WG Bagnall	1857	1909	1970	Ex-Christchurch Gas works. Donated to the CRS in 1970 Leased to the Pleasant Point Museum and Railway for restoration in 1979, Returned in 1994. In outside storage.
Barclay		Andrew Barclay Sons & Co	1894	1926	1961	Ex-Lake Brunner Saw Milling Co., Ruru. In outside storage. Last steam locomotive imported to work on a bush tramway.
C^{B}		A & G Price	113	1927	1968	Ex-New Forest Sawmilling, Ngahere. Donated in 1968. Restored in 1975, and overhauled again in 1981 and 1998. Stored since 2008
Heisler		Stearns Manufacturing Co.	1450	1922	1966	Ex-New Forest Sawmilling Company. Donated in 1966. Arrived with a current boiler ticket and operated during the early days of the Ferrymead Railway. It is now currently stored..
Manning Wardle	Kermit	Manning Wardle	1841	1914	1975	Ex-Christchurch Meat Company, Islington. Donated in 1975 and restored to working order. Withdrawn from service in 1985.

=== NZR diesel locomotives ===
Key:	In service	In service, Mainline Certified	Under overhaul/restoration	Stored	Static display	Scrapped

Original class and number	TMS class and number	Builder	Builder's number	Year built	Arrived	Notes
T^{R} 22	TR 91	Drewry	2101	1939	1985	Entered service in March 1939 for the NZR. Withdrawn in May 1985 and purchased by the Diesel Traction Group in that year. Used for a shunter for years until being loaned to the CRS. In 1996 it was sold to the society. In 2010 it was taken out of service. In 2012 it returned to service in a yellow livery.
PWD 2112	T^{R} 54	Hudswell Clarke	D599	1936	1966	Entered service in 1936 for the Public Works Department as PWD 2112. It was purchased by the NZR in February 1956 and reclassified T^{R} 54. It was withdrawn in October 1966. This is the smallest locomotive at the Ferrymead Heritage Park, and it weighs only four tonnes. It is powered by a Paxman Ricardo diesel engine of 40 hp driving through a 3 speed gearbox with a top speed of 15 km/h. It is now stored unserviceable.
T^{R} 111	442	A & G Price	208	1963	July 2015	Entered NZR service in November 1963. Withdrawn and sold to Reid McNaught. In 2006 it was leased to the Taieri Gorge Railway (now Dunedin Railways). In October in the same year it was repainted into the NZR Midland Red livery and took part in the Dunedin Railway Stations 100th birthday celebrations. It was then sold in 2009 to the TGR. It was sold to the society in July 2015. It is currently on loan to Weka Pass Railway
T^{R} 156	TR 592	WG Bagnall	3105	1957	February 1999	Entered service in July 1957 for the NZR. Withdrawn and purchased by the CRS in December 1998. It arrived on site in February 1999 and was restored in the NZR Midland Red livery later that year.

In addition:

- In October 2013 Dunedin Railways D^{J} 1209 took part for the NZ Rail 150 celebrations at Ferrymead. A recent purchase from Oamaru Steam and Rail has now added DSA No. 234 to the collection.

=== Electric locomotives ===
Key:	In service	In service, Mainline Certified	Under overhaul/restoration	Stored	Static display	Scrapped

Original class and number	TMS class and number	Builder	Builders number	Year built	Arrived	Notes
E^{C} 7		English Electric	723	1928	1972	Entered service in February 1929 for the NZR for the Lyttelton Tunnel. Withdrawn in September 1970. It was stored at the Linwood until being purchased by the CRS in 1972, then it was moved to the Ferrymead. Stored until 1977 when it was moved to the railway. In October 1988 the 'E^{C}' took part in the Ferrymead 125 cavalcade. In November the same year it was officially commissioned on the electrified section of the railway.
E^{D} 103	ED 21	NZR Hutt Workshops	355	1939	September 1983	Entered service in June 1939 for the NZR. Withdrawn on 7 November 1981 and sold to the New Zealand Railway & Locomotive Society and displayed at their Seaview base. It was then sold to the CRS in 1983 and arrived in September the same year. In 1988 it was repainted red and took part in the Ferrymead 125 cavalcade in October the same year. It has been stored since.
E^{O} 3		English Electric	524	1922	1972	Entered service on 4 August 1923 for the NZR for the Otira Tunnel as E 3. It was reclassified 'E^{O}' for them not be confused with the 'E^{C}' class of 1928. Withdrawn in April 1968 due to being replaced by the 1967 built E^{A} class locomotives. It was stored from April 1968 to 1972 when it was purchased by the CRS and arrived at the Ferrymead Heritage Park. Stored until 1977 when it was restored. In October 1988 the 'E^{O}' took part in the Ferrymead 125 cavalcade. It received a Restoration Award from the National Federation of Railway Societies in 1996.
E^{W} 1806	EW 171	Robert Stephenson and Hawthorns	1736/E7492	1952	September 1983	Entered service in November 1952 for the NZR. It was derailed at Paekākāriki on 16 September 1961 after hitting a slip. Withdrawn in November 1987 and sold to the CRS. Arrived in that year. It took part in the Ferrymead 125 cavalcade. Restoration work was underway until 2011 when the 2011 Christchurch earthquakes struck, although some work has been carried out since then.

In addition:

- In June 1998, a year after the end of the Otira electrification EOs 45 and 74 were leased to the CRS for storage and display in June 1998. In November 1999 EOs 39, 51 and 68 were transferred to Ferrymead as well. 45, 68 and 74 operated at the park ark on a number of times occasions including Easter Weekend in 2000. Three of the EOs were moved to Picton in 2004 while the other two stayed until 2008.

=== Railcars ===
Key:	In service	In service, Mainline Certified	Under overhaul/restoration	Stored	Static display	Scrapped

Number	Builder	Builder's number	Year built	Arrived at the Ferrymead Heritage Park	Notes
RM 51	Vulcan Foundry	4846	1939	March 1979	Entered service in June 1941 for the NZR. Withdrawn in September 1978 and purchased by the CRS in the same year. It arrived in March 1979. Used until 1990 it failed for an excursion with RM 56 for the 1990 Sesqui-Centennial. It was dedicated in 1995 to the memory of the late Gordon Jory, a founding member of the Canterbury Railway Society, who was instrumental in the preservation of it. In 2000 it returned to service but failed again with forcing it in storage. Stored until 2009 when an overhaul commenced for it be return to service. It was returned to service on 9 September 2013.
RM 56	Vulcan Foundry	4851	1939	1 October 1978	Entered service in January 1942 for the NZR. Withdrawn in September 1978. Purchased by the National Federation of Railway Societies and arrived on 1 October the same year. It was used in the 1988 Ferrymead 125 celebrations and in 1990 for the Sesqui-Centennial with excursions on the West Coast and most notably between Westport and Hokitika. In 2008 it was donated to the CRS and repaired in time for the 125th celebrations of the Otago Central Railway in October 2009.
RM 57	Vulcan Foundry	4852	1939	March 1979	Entered service in January 1942 for the NZR. Withdrawn in April 1978. Purchased by the CRS in the same year. It arrived in March 1979. It has been in outside storage since.

=== Electric multiple units ===
Key:	In service	In service, Mainline Certified	Under overhaul/restoration	Stored	Static display	Scrapped

Original class and number	TMS class and number	Names	Builder	Builder's number	Year built	Arrived at the Ferrymead Heritage Park	Notes
D 163	D 2695	Red Robin	English Electric	1649	1952	13 October 1988	Entered service in July 1953 for the NZR. During its service it was paired with D^{M} 27. Withdrawn in June 1988 and purchased by two Wellington Rail Enthusiasts and donated to the CRS in October the same year. When it arrived on 13 October it was placed into storage. It was used for the celebrations of the completion of the electrification at the Ferrymead Heritage Park on 9 June 2007. In the same year it was leased to the Greater Wellington Regional Council for uses in Wellington. It was restored at Hutt Workshops and repainted in the NZR Midland Red livery. It returned to service in October 2008. It was withdrawn again on 19 March 2012. It returned to Ferrymead on 22 July in the same year. It was recommissioned by the CRS on 21 September 2013.
D^{M} 27	DM 320	Red Robin	English Electric	1572	1950	13 October 1988	Entered service on 20 March 1951 for the NZR. During its service it was paired with D 163. Withdrawn in June 1988 and purchased by two Wellington Rail Enthusiasts and donated to the CRS in October the same year. When it arrived on 13 October it was placed into storage. It was used for the celebrations of the completion of the electrification at the Ferrymead Heritage Park on 9 June 2007. In the same year it was leased to the Greater Wellington Regional Council for uses in Wellington. It was restored at Hutt Workshops and repainted in the NZR Midland Red livery. It returned to service in October 2008. It was withdrawn again on 19 March 2012. It returned to Ferrymead on 22 July in the same year. It was recommissioned by the CRS on 21 September 2013.
	EM 1373 / ET 3373		Ganz-Mavag		1982	May 2016	Entered service in December 1982 for the NZR, operating on Wellington suburban lines. It is currently stored outside.

=== Carriages ===
Key:	In service	In service, Mainline Certified	Under overhaul/restoration	Stored	Static display	Scrapped

Original class and cumber	TMS class and number	Builder	Type	Year built	Arrived	Notes
A 47		NZR Addington Workshops	39' 7" wooden body, passenger coach	1891	1973	Entered NZR service in 1891 as a Saloon/Birdcage car. In 1954 it was moved to a private property in Winters, Oxford.
A 104		NZR Addington Workshops	44' 0" wooden body, passenger coach	1883	1964	Entered NZR service as C 104. Reclassified In June 1883 at Hillside Workshops as A 104. Reclassified to E^{A} 1942. Withdrawn on 12 September 1964.
A 222		Oldbury Car Company	43' 9" wooden body, passenger coach	1880	15 December 2005	Entered NZR service in 1880 as C 222 as a 33' 6" wooden body. It was converted to a bogie carriage and reclassified as A 222 in 1889 at Hillside Workshops. In 1945 it was reclassified and renumbered as E^{A} 1943 by the Ways and Works Department. It was again used by the NZR from 1965 and 2005. It was then leased to the society by the Rail Heritage Trust of New Zealand and placed into storage. Ownership changed in 2010 to the society after being owned by the Rail Heritage Trust since the 1990s. Restored in 2010 and won the 2010 FRONZ restoration award.
A 463		NZR Addington Workshops	43' 9" wooden body, passenger coach	1894	1976	Entered NZR service in 1894. Withdrawn on 3 December 1966 at Greymouth and sold to the society. In the 2000s it was leased to the Waimea Plains Railway.
A 516		NZR Addington Workshops	43' 9" wooden body, passenger coach	1896	1971	Entered NZR service in 1896. Withdrawn on 3 December 1966. Stored until 1971 and sold to the society. Restored in the 1980s. A part of the Heritage train.
A 518		NZR Addington Workshops	43' 9" wooden body, passenger coach	1896	1966	Entered NZR service in 1896. Used as by the Ways and Works Department as E^{A} 5590. Withdrawn on 3 December 1966 and sold to the society.
A 585		NZR Hillside Workshops	43' 9" wooden body, passenger coach	1900	1978	Entered NZR service in 1900. In 1964 it was used by the Ways and Works department as E^{A} 3558. Withdrawn on 9 September 1978.
A 1177		NZR Addington Workshops	50' 0" wooden body, passenger coach	1912	1973	Entered NZR service on 31 March 1912. Withdrawn on 4 November 1967. It was purchased by the Christchurch Model Railway Club. It was later sold to the society and restored in 2007. Its interior is now being overhauled.
A 1535		NZR Hillside Workshops	47' 6" wooden body, passenger coach	1923	1969	Body from A 1381. It was operated by the Ways & Works Department as their E^{A} 3178 from 1959 to 1977. Withdrawn on 14 September 1968.
A 1552		NZR Addington Workshops	47' 6" wooden body, passenger coach	1924	1967	Entered NZR service in 1924. Withdrawn on 26 April 1969. Restored in the 2000s.
A 1617		NZR Addington Workshops	47' steel-panelled mainline coach	1927	2006	Entered NZR service on 31 March 1927. Used as a Royal car until a few years later after being commissioned it was used as a Ministerial Car. In 1953 it was then converted to a Royal Support car. A year later it was converted back to a Ministerial Car. Withdrawn on 7 December 1957. It was stored in Arthurs Pass until 1992 when it was then stored at Moana. In 2003 it was then stored in Dunedin until 2006 when it was purchased by the society. Currently stored.
A 1825		NZR Addington Workshops	50' steel-panelled mainline coach	1934	1999	Entered NZR service on 31 March 1935. In 1969 it was converted to a Dynamo-meter Car and reclassified as E^{A} 3950. Then renumbered as EA 1559. Used as a Royal Carriage in 1953/54. Withdrawn in 1999.
A 1880	A 1320	NZR Otahuhu Workshops	56' steel-panelled mainline coach	1937	2000s	Entered NZR service on 20 August 1937 as a NZR sleeper car. In 1981 it stored, but wasn't official written off until 20 June 1987. It was later purchased by the society.
A^{F} 863		NZR Addington Workshops	47' 6' wooden body, passenger coach	1904	1981	Entered NZR service in 1904 as A 863. Converted to a carvan type of car and reclassified as A^{F} 863. Used by the Ways and Works Department as amenities car E^{A} 3566. Later renumbered as EA 883. Withdrawn in April 1981 Took part in the Otago Central Railways 125 celebrations. 1981 Ferrymead Railway
B 231		Oldbury Carriage Company	31' wooden body, passenger coach	1873	1971	Entered NZR service in 1874 as C 231. In 1889 it was rebuilt at Addington Workshops with a new style 'clerestory' roof, and 2 - 4 wheel bogies replacing the original 6 wheels. In 1941 it was used by Ways and Works Department as E^{A} 1739. Sold to the society in 1971 and placed into storage. Restored in 2005. A part of the Heritage train.
D 26		Oldbury Carriage Company	21' 6" wooden body, passenger coach	1874	1967	Entered NZR service in 1875. Withdrawn in 1916. Sold to Homebush Brick Tile and Coal Co. It was later stored at Tara Homestead. Arrived in 1967 and stored. Restored in 1999. A part of the Heritage train.
D 137		Oldbury Carriage Company	21' 6" wooden body, passenger coach	1877	1966	Underframe is stored in the carriage shed.

In addition:

- The underframe of A 272 and another unidentified 'A' car are in storage.

=== Vans ===
Key:	In service	In service, Mainline Certified	Under overhaul/restoration	Stored	Static display	Scrapped

Original class and cumber	TMS class and number	Builder	Type	Year built	Arrived	Notes
F 24		N/A	30' wooden body, guards' van	1883	N/A	
F 67		NZR Hillside Workshops	30' wooden body, guards' van	1955	N/A	Withdrawn on 31 January 1970.
F 78		NZR Addington Workshops	20' wooden body, guards' van	1884	1963	Entered NZR service in 1884. Withdrawn in 1942. Stored at Addington Workshops uintil 1963 when it was donated to the society. A part of the Heritage train.
F 79		NZR Addington Workshops	20' wooden body, guards' van	1884	1968	Entered NZR service in 1884. Used by the Ways and Works Department as E 1739 for use as a portable tool store. Withdrawn and sold to the society in 1968. Won the 2002 A & G Price restoration award. A part of the Heritage train.
F 199		N/A	20' wooden body, guards' van	1893	1893	Leased to Waimea Plains Railway
F 372		NZR Hillside Workshops	30' wooden body, guards' van	1911	1975	Entered NZR service in January 1911. Withdrawn on 25 May 1975.
F 624		NZR Addington Workshops	14' wooden body, guards' van	1943	1975	Entered NZR service in 1943 as a Fell Break van for the Rewanui Incline. Withdrawn on 25 February 1967. On display in the Hall Of Wheels.
F 634	F 2482	NZR Addington Workshops	30' steel-panelled guards' van	1955	N/A	
NH 399	FH 16	NZR Addington Workshops	Steel-panelled guards' van	N/A	N/A	Entered NZR service as NH 8362. Later reclassified FH 16 and E 8362. Used as W 192's support van.

== Gallery ==
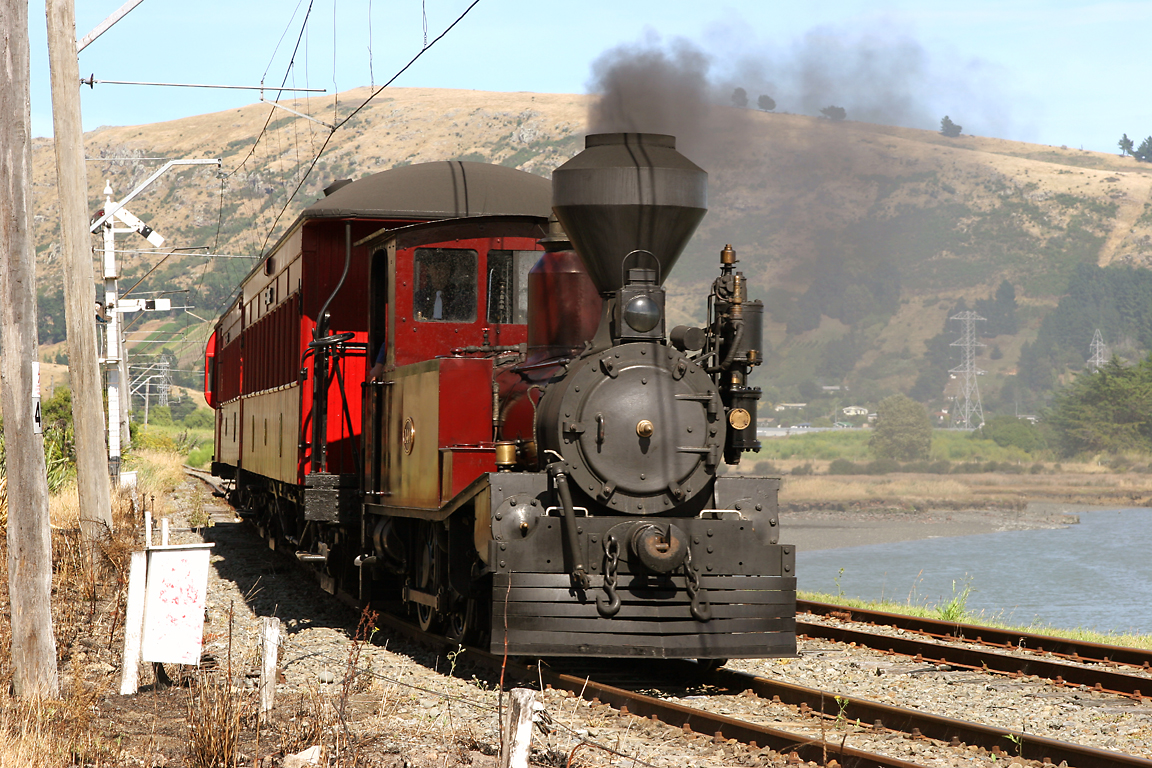
D 140 operating on the Ferrymead Railway.

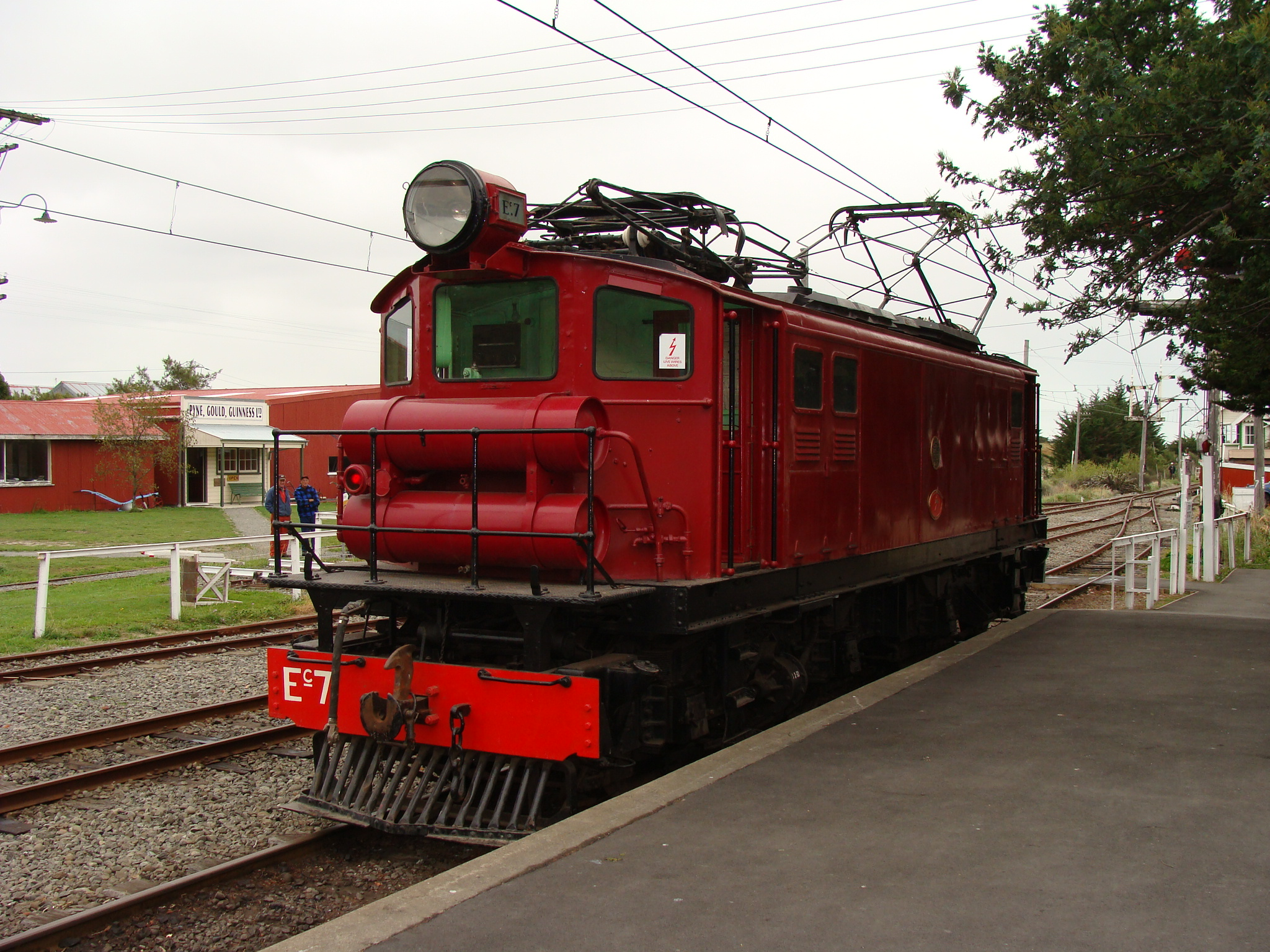
E^{C} 7 at Moorhouse Station.

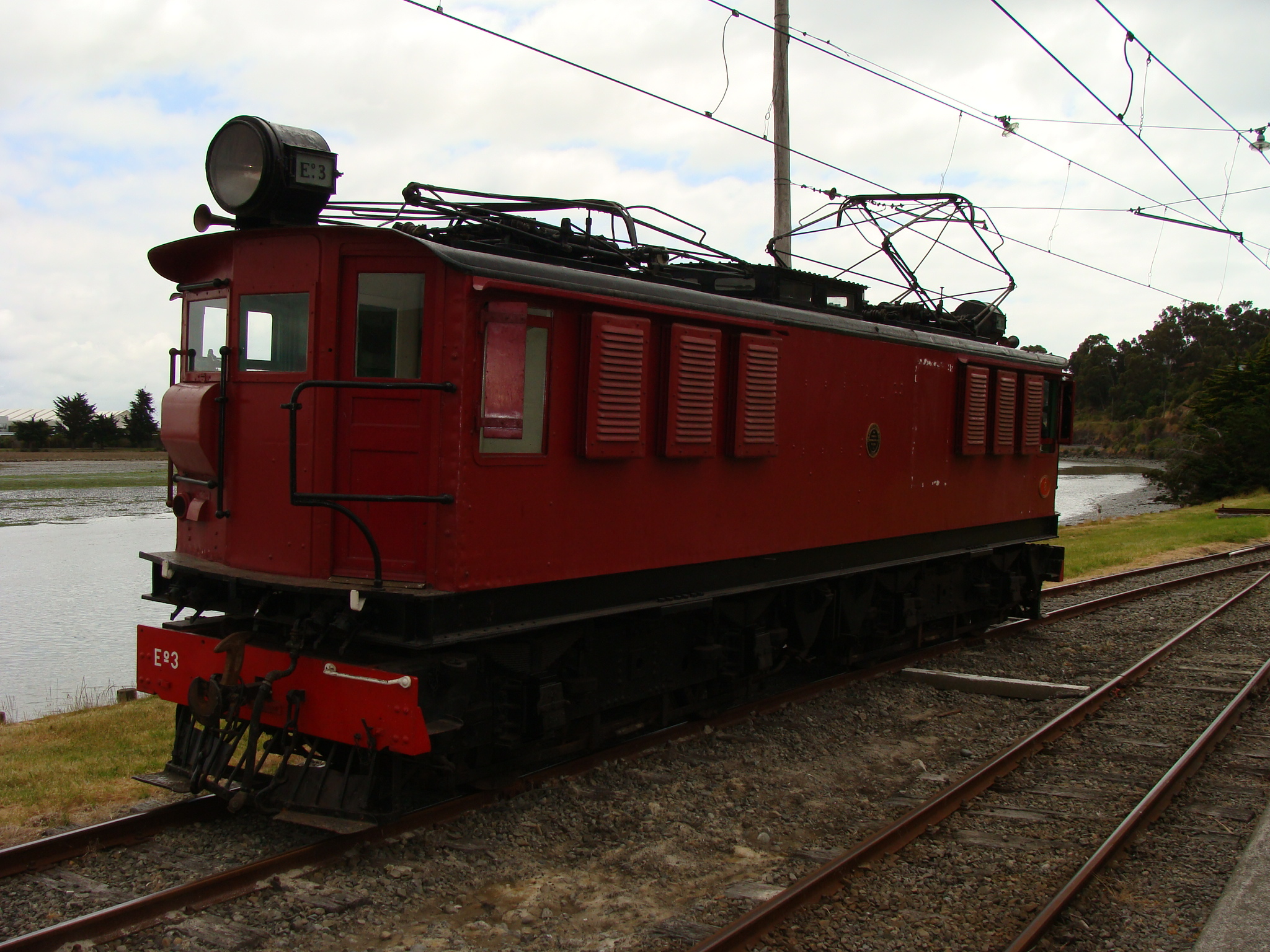
E^{O} 3 running around a train at the Ferrymead.

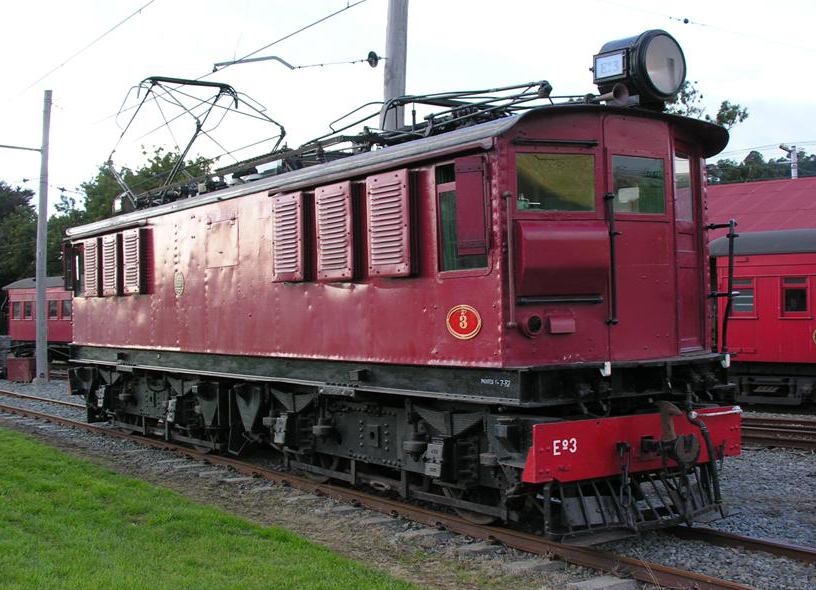
E^{O} 3 in Moorhouse.

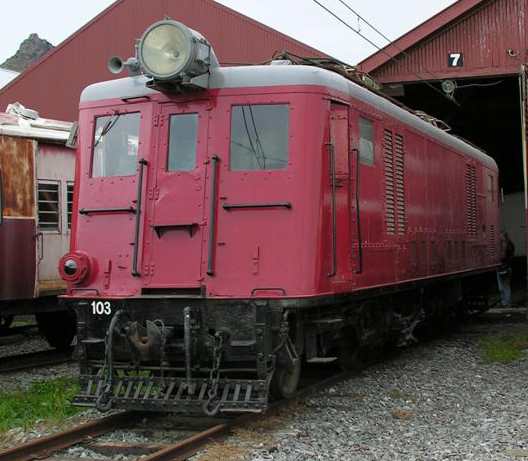
E^{D} 103 outside the electric shed at Ferrymead.

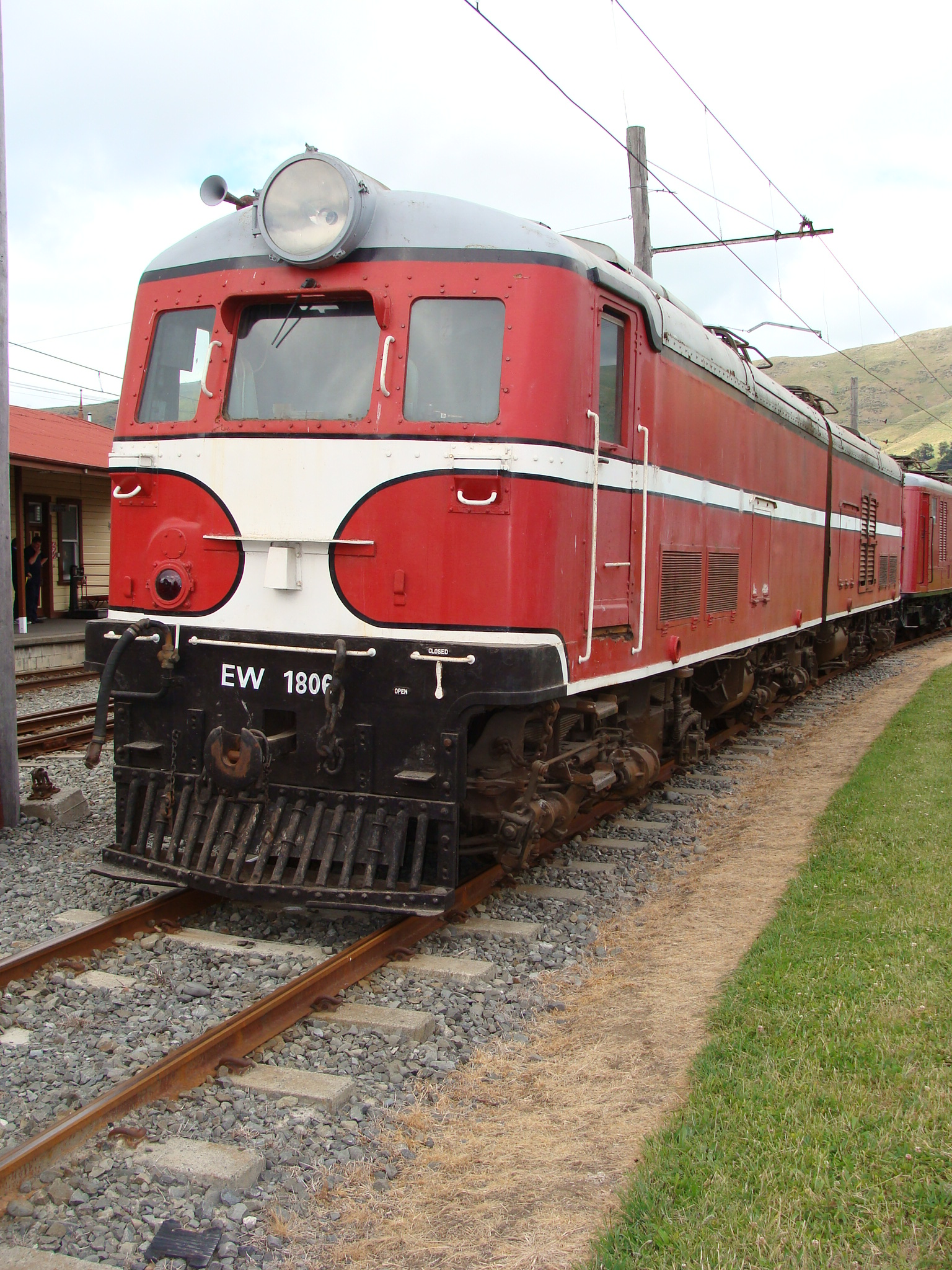
E^{W} 1806 in the Moorhouse station yard at the Ferrymead Heritage Park.

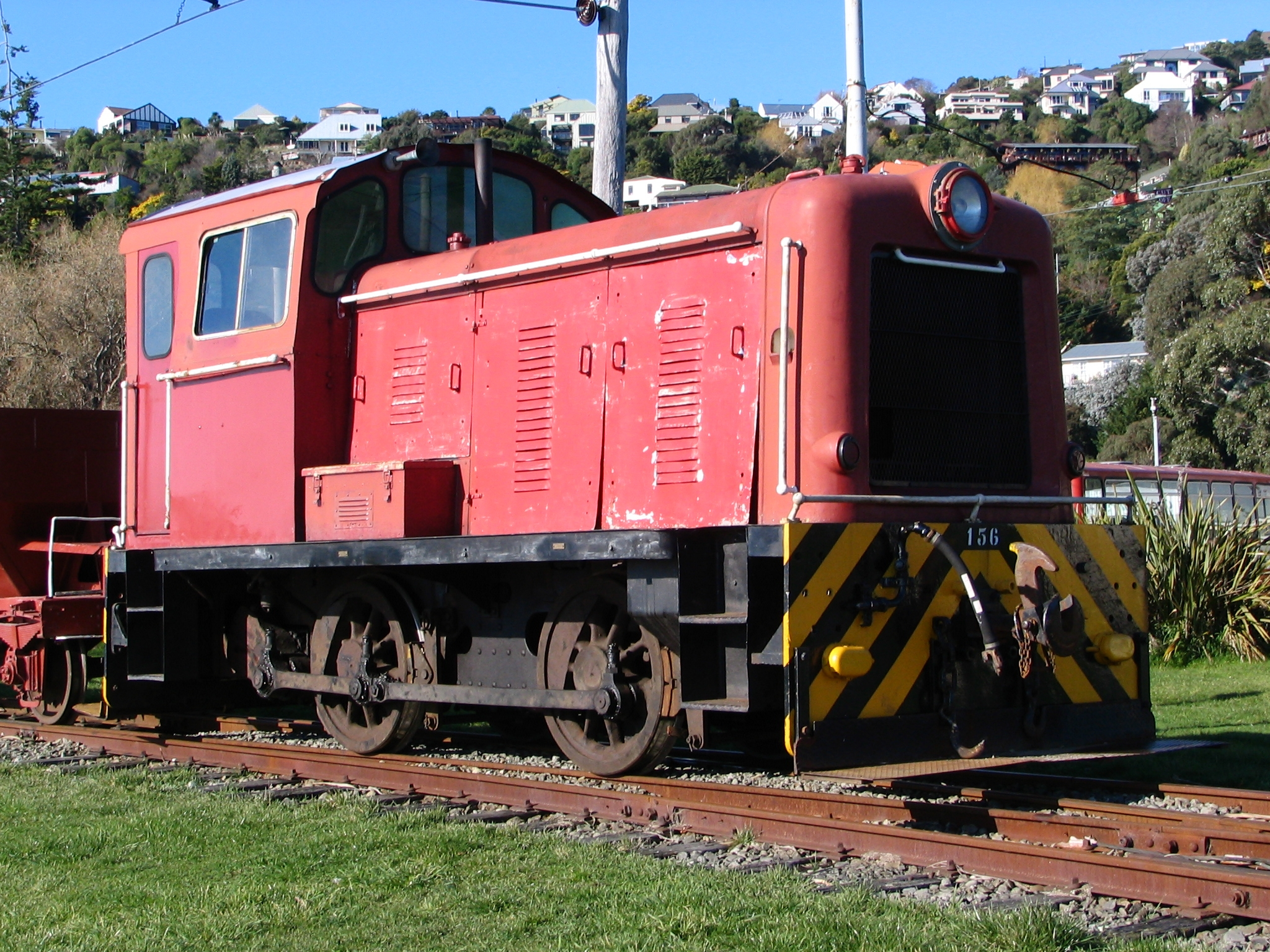
T^{R} 156 at Ferrymead Station.
