= New Zealand EW class locomotive =

Class of New Zealand electric locomotives

New Zealand E^{W} class locomotive
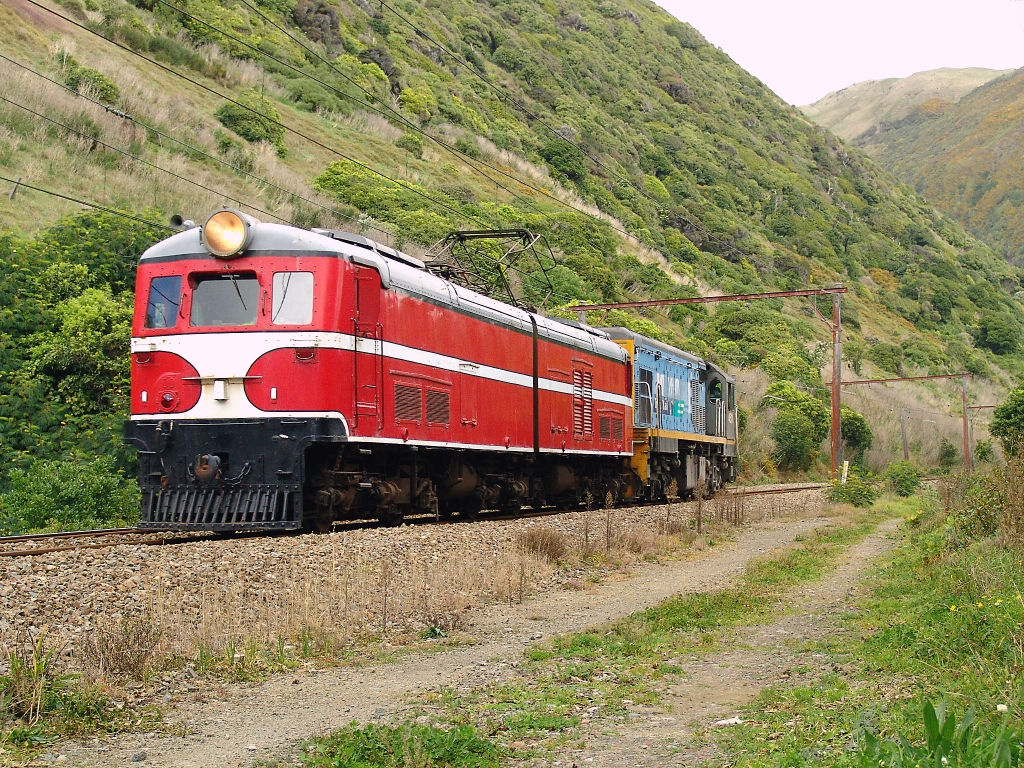
- E^{W} 1805 with DC 4611 approaching Paekākāriki, 21 August 2005. The E^{W} had been purchased for preservation and was later towed to Plimmerton.
Type and origin
- Power type: Electric
- Builder: English Electric/Robert Stephenson and Hawthorns, England
Specifications
- Configuration
  - UIC: Bo′Bo′Bo′
- Gauge: 1,067 mm (3 ft 6 in)
- Length: 18.9 metres (62 ft 0 in)
- Adhesive weight: 76 tonnes (75 long tons; 84 short tons)
- Loco weight: 76 tonnes (75 long tons; 84 short tons)
- Electric system/s: 1,500 V DC overhead lines
- Current pickup: Pantograph
- Traction motors: 6
Performance figures
- Maximum speed: 97 km/h (60 mph)
- Power output: 1,340 kW (1,800 hp)
- Tractive effort: 104 kN (23,000 lb_{f})
Career
- Operators: New Zealand Railways
- Class: EW
- Number in class: 7
- Locale: Wellington region
- First run: 18 March 1952
- Last run: 20 December 1983
- Disposition: 5 scrapped; 2 preserved

The New Zealand EW class (Note: Following the introduction of TMS in 1979, the class classification was capitalised, whereas previously the second letter was a smaller capital letter, that is E^{W}) locomotive is a type of electric locomotive used in Wellington, New Zealand. For two decades, until the introduction of the D^{X} class diesel locomotives in 1972, they were the most powerful locomotives in New Zealand.

== Introduction ==
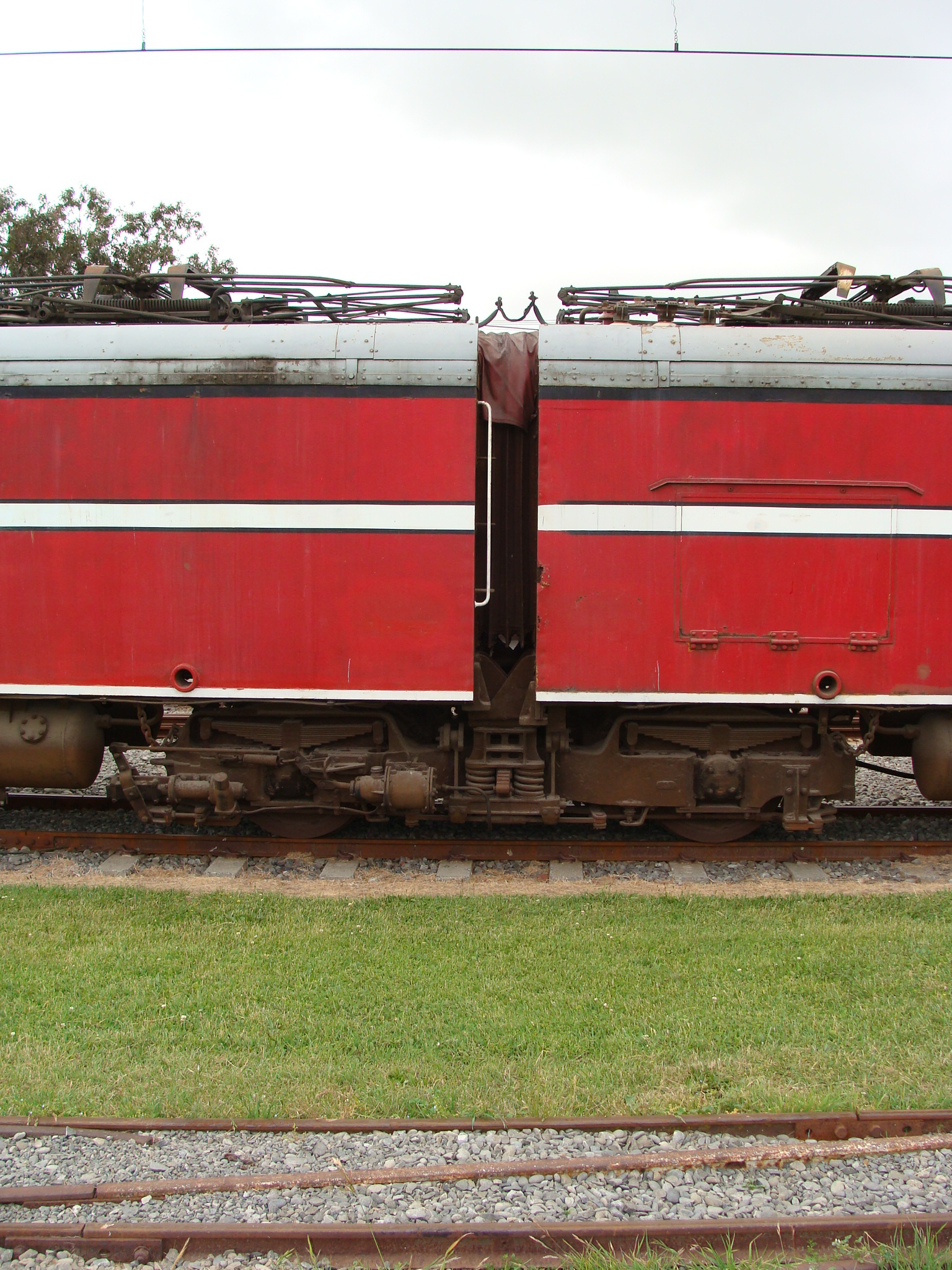
The Jacobs bogie and bellows of E^{W} 1806.

The E^{W} class were ordered by New Zealand Railways from English Electric through their New Zealand agents Cory-Wright & Salmon in 1951 as a replacement for the earlier E^{D} class electric locomotives on passenger duties. The classification "E^{W}" was due to their being electric locomotives allocated to Wellington. It was felt that the E^{D} class was not suitable for passenger trains, and so English Electric was commissioned to build a twin-section articulated electric locomotive for use on the Wellington 1.5 kV DC electrified system.

The new E^{W} class was the first locomotive class in New Zealand to utilise the Bo-Bo-Bo wheel arrangement, which would subsequently be used on the Mitsubishi D^{J} class and Brush EF class locomotives. The E^{W} class was different in that the central Jacobs bogie was placed under the articulation of the two body halves with limited side play, whereas the D^{J} and EF classes have a single fixed body with side play in the central bogie.

It was intended that the E^{W} class would work on all trains in the Wellington area, as well as banking trains between Paekākāriki and Pukerua Bay.

== Service ==
The E^{W} class predominantly worked on passenger trains, particularly on suburban trains to the Hutt Valley and Paekākāriki. They also ran in regular service hauling Main Trunk expresses between Wellington and Paekākāriki, where they would be exchanged for a steam locomotive for the run north. They also were used to bank trains between Wellington and Paekākāriki, although this work was more usually done by the older E^{D} class, which were unsuited for passenger workings.

Less frequently, the E^{W} class also operated suburban shunting services, particularly on the Johnsonville Branch, where their flexible bodies and higher power output of 1,800 hp (1,300 kW) gave them a distinct advantage over the older E^{D} class (and tests showed that the E^{D} class imposed higher stress on the track, particularly on curves). Much of this traffic was stock destined for the Raroa stockyard sidings, from where they would be driven to the Ngauranga Freezing Works nearby, while the remainder was general freight destined largely for Johnsonville.

The class was well-liked by the railway unions as NZR had worked closely with them in the design phase of the E^{W} class. This led to the cabs being laid out in an ergonomic fashion which made them easy to operate, making them a favourite of the unions. They were also fairly reliable and were also capable of generating twice their specified power output as evidenced by an NZR engineer during a test in the 1960s when E^{W} 1806 produced a power output of 3,600 hp (2,700 kW).

=== Renumbering ===
With the introduction of the Traffic Monitoring System (TMS) in 1979, the locomotives were renumbered EW96-EW165.

== Withdrawal ==
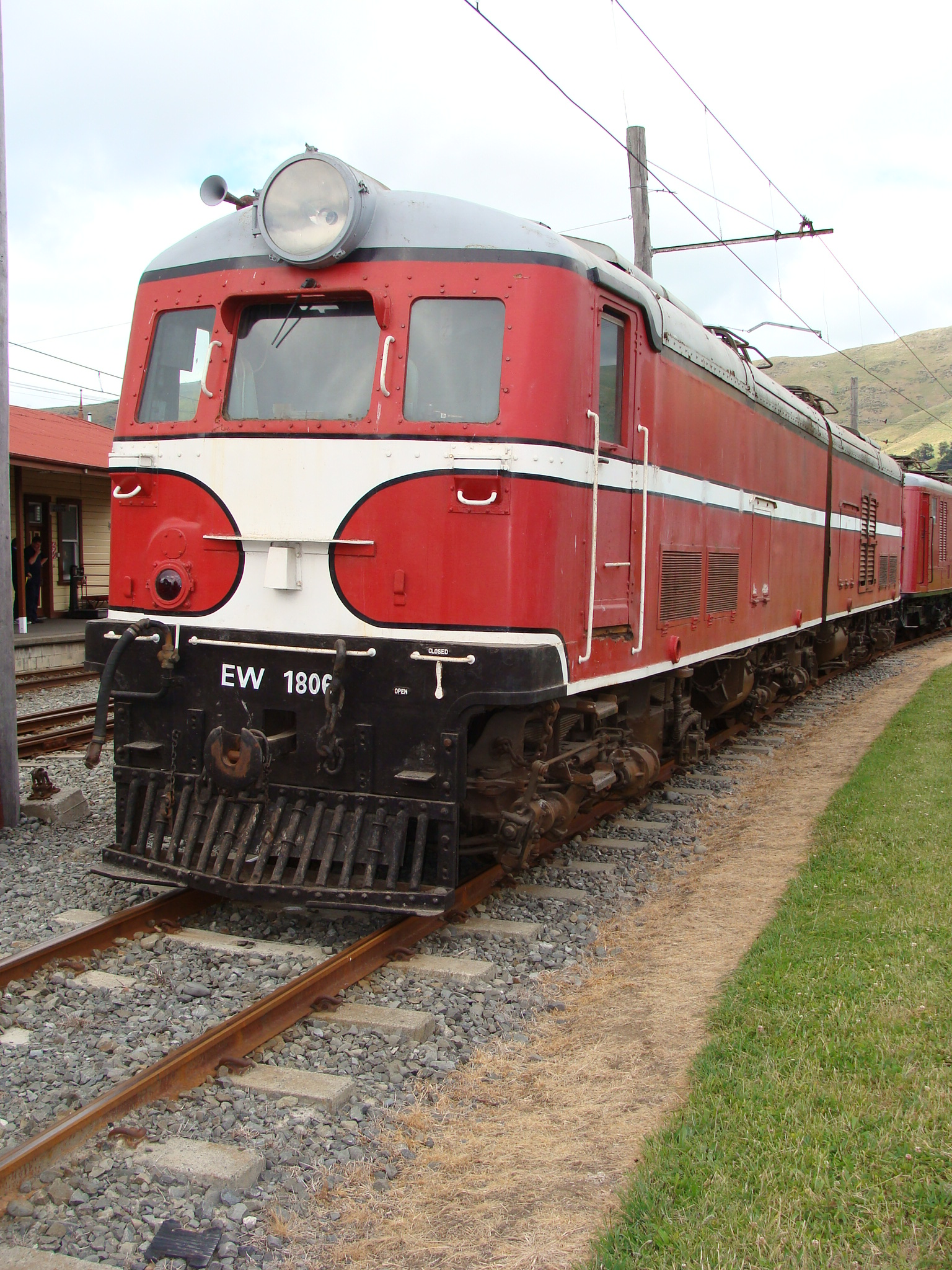
E^{W} 1806 at Ferrymead Heritage Park in 2009.

The tunnel floors between Paekākāriki and Wellington were lowered so that D^{A} class diesel locomotives could haul trains through to Wellington without having to stop at Paekākāriki to be replaced by an E^{D} or E^{W}; the work was completed in 1967. The E^{W}s continued to have a role in this, primarily as a banking locomotive.

In 1980, EW159 (E^{W} 1805) was briefly sent to Otira following the Goat Creek washout, which had damaged three of the EO class locomotives. During its time there the locomotive required its own driver as it lacked multiple-unit equipment. When the three rebuilt EOs returned, EW 159 was transferred back to Wellington. The following year, the decision was made by the CME to have EW136 (E^{W} 1802), then under overhaul, withdrawn and scrapped. This was agreed to as the use of the EW class had decreased, and 136 became the first EW to be withdrawn.

With the arrival of the EM class units in 1982 locomotive-hauled carriage trains were eliminated, with all carriage-hauled services ceasing in 1983 with the exception of the Masterton and Palmerston North services, which had been diesel-hauled since their inception. The last EW to haul a suburban train was EW142 (E^{W} 1803) from Paekākāriki to Wellington on 11 February 1983. EW142 ran an excursion known as "The Suburban Rail Ranger" to Johnsonville on 14 May 1983.

The EW class finished its working life on mainline goods trains, banking DA or DX class locomotives between Wellington and Paekākāriki with Train 778, the Wellington-Palmerston North petrol tank train, being a common assignment. This was the last service to use the EW class, concluding on 20 December 1983 when EW142 banked DX5477 on the last revenue operation of the EW class. All of the remaining locomotives were put into storage.

== Storage ==
As the EW class was not worn out, NZR management decided to have the six remaining locomotives placed into interim storage until a new use could be found for them. It was decided to store the locomotives in available locomotive sheds around the country, which would provide secure and where possible, covered storage.

The locomotives were dispersed as follows:

- EW107 and EW159 were moved to Stratford.
- EW113 was moved to Addington Workshops.
- EW142 and EW165 were moved to the Hutt Workshops.
- EW171 was moved to Timaru, before moving to Palmerston and then Hillside Workshops.

In 1988, the decision was made to move EW171 north to Christchurch, and it was donated to the Electric Traction Group at Ferrymead, arriving in time to take part in the Ferrymead 125 motive power cavalcade.

As New Zealand Railways was creating its Heritage Fleet at this time, it was decided to select an EW for preservation. EW165 was chosen and was moved to Wellington for remedial work along with DE1389 (D^{E} 508) prior to its official inclusion in the fleet. The remaining locomotives were scrapped; EW107 and EW159 were towed back to Hutt Workshops in 1988, where they joined EW 142 prior to being scrapped. EW113 went to Linwood for a period before it was later towed to a siding at Woolston alongside the South Island Main Trunk, where it remained for a short time before being scrapped in early 1990.

== Preservation ==
The first EW class locomotive to be preserved, E^{W} 1806 (TMS EW171), was donated to the Canterbury Railway Society in 1988. It is based at Ferrymead Heritage Park and is in storage. It has been renumbered as E^{W} 1806, and carries this identity on its headstocks only.

The other, EW165 (E^{W} 1805), was based in Wellington, originally in the old NZR Parcels depot on Platform 9 of Wellington Station, before moving to the Carriage and Wagon workshop near the Thorndon overpass. It retained its TMS identity of EW165 throughout until the decision was made to disperse the Heritage Fleet in 2004. The EW was not sold until August 2005, when it was purchased by Ian Welch of the Mainline Steam Heritage Trust. The locomotive made one final run under then-Toll Rail ownership on 21 August 2005 when it was driven by veteran locomotive driver Fred Hamer from Wellington to Paekākāriki. It was then towed by DCP4611 to Mainline's Plimmerton depot.

Since arrival, EW165 has been restored as E^{W} 1805 complete with replica number plates. It is intended that the locomotive will be used to operate suburban railfan trips around Wellington when the overhaul is finished, although this is pending certification and the construction of a suitable length of overhead into the depot to allow 1805 to move around. The locomotive was revealed as E^{W} 1805 over Labour Weekend 2008 when it was towed to Feilding to take part in the NIMT centenary celebrations.

== Accidents ==
The E^{W} class have been involved in four major accidents during their service lives:

- 1961 - E^{W} 1806 hauling a Wellington-bound freight train was derailed by a fall of rock over the abandoned No 12 tunnel on 19 September 1961, between Pukerua Bay and Paekakariki on the North–South Junction, and was nearly pushed over the bank to the road below. This occurred just after the passing of the Auckland Express, and E^{W} 1806 was subsequently given an "A" grade overhaul, the first given to any of the class after ten years of service.
- 1964 - E^{W} 1803 hauling an empty suburban service collides with Bagnall D^{SA} 248 hauling a shunt at Woburn railway station. The driver on the E^{W} passed a signal at danger and was subsequently fired.
- 1975 - E^{W} 1805 overruns the buffers at Wellington railway station. It was discovered the cocks on the air-brake hoses on the second carriage had been closed during shunting, limiting the operation of the air-brakes to the locomotive and first carriage only. The N^{O} 2 end of the E^{W} was subsequently rebuilt with a new style of window different from the standard E^{W} type windows, and retains this modification today in preservation.
- 1979 - E^{W} 1805 sustained damage in a shunting collision at Taita on 2 July 1979.
