= New Zealand EA class locomotive =

Class of electric locomotives

New Zealand E^{A}/EO class
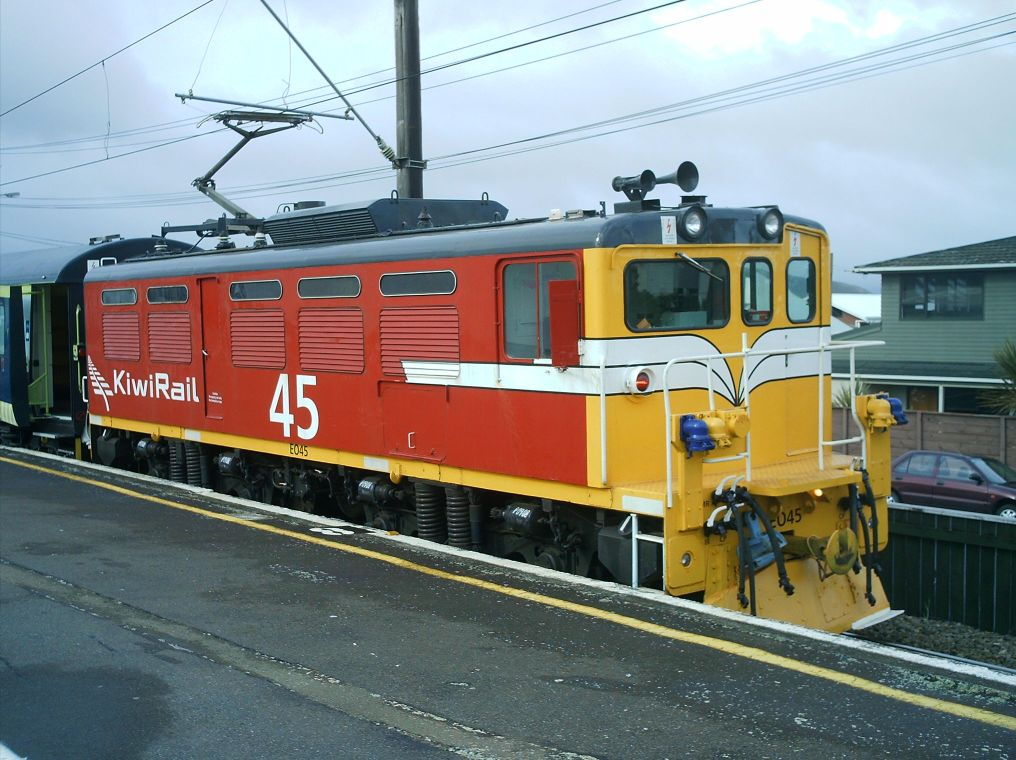
- EO45 at Plimmerton in 2008
Type and origin
- Power type: Electric
- Builder: Toshiba Heavy Industries, Japan
- Build date: 1968
Specifications
- Configuration
  - UIC: Bo-Bo
- Gauge: 3 ft 6 in (1,067 mm)
- Length: 11.6 metres (38 ft)
- Adhesive weight: 55 tonnes (54 long tons; 61 short tons)
- Loco weight: 55 tonnes (54 long tons; 61 short tons)
- Electric system/s: 1500 V DC overhead lines
- Current pickup: Pantograph
- Traction motors: 4
Performance figures
- Maximum speed: 72 km/h (45 mph)
- Power output: 960 kW (1,290 hp)
Career
- Operators: Tranz Rail, Tranz Metro
- Class: originally Ea, now EO
- Number in class: 5
- Numbers: Ea 1-5 (original); EO39-74 (TMS)
- Locale: Otira – Arthur's Pass ( 24 April 1968 – 1 November 1997); Wellington (8 December 2008 – 10 November 2011)
- First run: 24 April 1968 (Otira); 8 December 2008 (Wellington)
- Last run: 1 November 1997 (Otira); 10 November 2011 (Wellington)
- Disposition: 1 preserved, 4 scrapped

The New Zealand E^{A} class (later reclassified as EO) (Note: Following the introduction of TMS in 1979, the class classification was capitalised, whereas previously the second letter was a smaller capital letter, that is E^{A}) of electric locomotives were used on the New Zealand rail network between 1968 and 1997 on the Otira – Arthur's Pass section of the Midland line in the South Island, through the Otira Tunnel. Following reconditioning, three were used by KiwiRail's Tranz Metro in Wellington from 2008 to 2011 to top and tail Metlink suburban passenger trains as an interim measure before new rolling stock arrived. Four of the five locomotives were scrapped in 2013 with one being set aside for preservation.

== Introduction ==
The class replaced the E^{O} class of 1923, by then largely worn out, on Otira Tunnel duties in 1968. Like their predecessors, the E^{A} class operated as a group of three, with two on standby at Otira. They were more powerful at 1,290 hp than the original E^{O} class at 680 hp, and so could handle heavier trains. This was to prove useful when West Coast coal exports began in the late 1970s using trains of dedicated LC high side coal wagons.

Standard operation of the E^{A}s would see three in service at any one time hauling trains between Otira and Arthur's Pass. The other two locomotives would remain at the Otira electric locomotive depot, although any one of the two spare units could be sent to Addington Workshops for an overhaul as required. They were mostly used to haul freight trains, although they did occasionally haul passenger trains either on their own or in multiple with the diesel locomotive pulling the train.

Originally the locomotives were classified as the E^{A} class until the early 1980s when they were reclassified into the EO class.

== Withdrawal ==
In 1987, demand for export coal necessitated the introduction of the CB class bogie hoppers on Ngakawau-Lyttelton export coal trains. These hoppers were heavier than the dedicated LC high side coal wagons previously used, and this led to a reduction in the amount that three EOs could haul through the tunnel.

In 1988, NZR began experimenting with the use of diesel traction through the Otira Tunnel, with the reallocation of DX class diesel locomotives from the North Island, redeployed following the opening of the North Island Main Trunk electrification. The experiment was unsuccessful, but it was found by modifying the DX class locomotives with low-level intakes and modified drawgear (locomotives modified in this manner were later reclassified DXC) and adding giant extraction fans and tunnel doors would be sufficient to allow diesel operation. The decision was made to decommission the Otira electrification which was no longer capable of meeting modern requirements and was also largely worn out after 74 years of heavy use.

The Otira – Arthur's Pass electrification was decommissioned on 16 July 1997. As a result, the EO class was withdrawn and placed into storage. A farewell excursion was held on 1 November 1997, with two EO units at one end, and two DC locos at the other end. EO 45 and EO 74 were moved to the Ferrymead Railway in June 1998 while EO 39, 51, and 68 were stored at Linwood Locomotive Depot in Christchurch. The trio at Linwood was stored outside, and became targets for local vandals, prompting Tranz Rail to move them to Ferrymead in November 1999.

Ferrymead could not store the locomotives either - they were kept out in the open on the main line connection beside the electric depot at Moorhouse station. With an eye to possibly restoring them for use in Wellington, Tranz Rail had EOs 45, 51 and 74 moved to the Picton locomotive depot for storage in October 2004. EO 39 and EO 68 remained at Ferrymead, where Electric Traction Group volunteers repainted EO 39. The ETG had also operated EO 45, 68, and 74 on several notable occasions while they were there.

== Reuse in Wellington ==
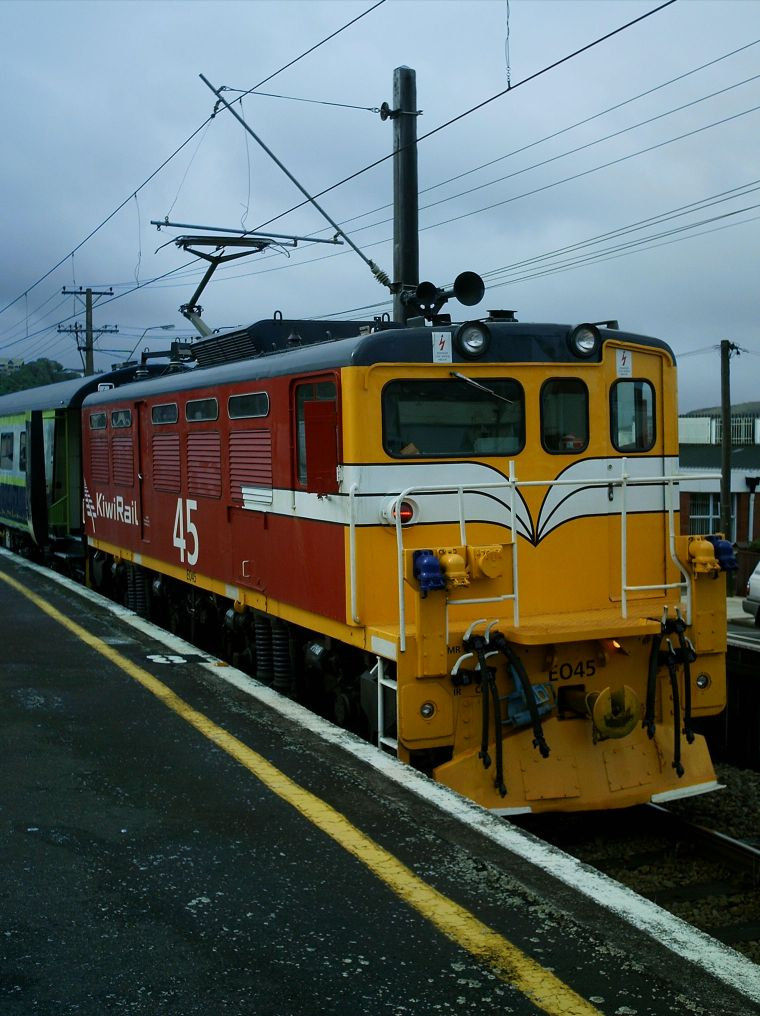
A locomotive at Plimmerton in 2008

On 3 October 2007, the three Picton locomotives were transferred north to the Hutt Workshops where they were refurbished for use by Tranz Metro on Wellington Metlink suburban trains as a short-term solution to increase capacity before the arrival of the Matangi EMUs. The locomotives were fitted with new radios, Translog event recorders, a single arm pantograph which replaced the two pantographs on each locomotive, and a signal trip which applied the brakes automatically if they passed a red signal (as used in the Wellington suburban area). The electrical and control systems were unchanged. Externally their colour scheme combined their older red livery with the new KiwiRail red and yellow livery, plus white whiskers on each yellow front end.

Two locomotives top and tailed six SE carriages owned by the Greater Wellington Regional Council and refurbished at Hillside Workshops, while the third locomotive was kept as a spare. The first such train ran on 8 December 2008. In October 2008, the two remaining EOs at Ferrymead, EOs 39 and 68, were also moved north to Hutt Workshops, where they were used for donor parts and remained unrestored.

The EO/SE train was typically stabled in Upper Hutt overnight, running an early morning service into Wellington before running to Plimmerton and back on the Paraparaumu Line (now the Kapiti Line). It stabled in Wellington until the afternoon peak, when it ran to Upper Hutt - a projected afternoon service to Plimmerton never eventuated. In early 2011, the Plimmerton run was discontinued, and towards the latter half of the year, the trip from Upper Hutt typically did not run, with the train returning to Wellington after the evening trip and overnighting there.

From September 2011, the train saw very little use in service, typically going out on a test run once a fortnight and if that was successful, running the evening train. The last time, the train carried passengers all the way to Upper Hutt was on 10 October 2011, and mechanical issues sidelined the train again. On 25 October 2011, after a test run, the train carried passengers from Wellington Station as far as opposite Thorndon locomotive sheds, where it failed. It managed to get back to Wellington under its own power to drop the passengers off, and the service was cancelled. Another test run was made on 3 November but was unsuccessful. During this time EO45 had been parked up at Hutt Workshops, leaving the set without a spare locomotive, but it returned to Wellington on 10 November 2011 and for a time all three refurbished EOs were coupled together in Wellington's north yard.

On 28 November 2011, the three EOs and the SE set were hauled to Hutt Workshops, withdrawn because of the EO maintenance issues. The SE carriages were intended to be modified for use on Wairarapa trains, but the fate of the EOs was unclear. One suggested use for the refurbished units was a return to banking duties replacing the two DBR locomotives primarily used for this on the North Island Main Trunk south of Paekakariki. However, the electrification to the freight yard had been removed following the withdrawal of the EW locomotives in the late 1980s, and the EOs general lack of reliability seemed to preclude their use.

It was believed that the unreliability issue stems from the use of the EOs as passenger locomotives, as they were in effect lower-geared freight locomotives. During their time in passenger service, the locomotives were required to run at speeds of up to 90km/h, a speed which they would never have reached in service while at Otira. Another likely factor in their latter unreliability on the Wellington system was the upping of the DC voltage in the overhead system from 1500 V to 1600 V for the Matangi units (after the retirement of the English Electric DM/D units).

== Disposal ==
In March 2013, four of the five electric locomotives stored at the Hutt Workshops were noted as being held on the workshops scrap road, after useful parts (many of them common to the later Toshiba-built DSJ class shunting locomotives) were stripped from them. The decision was taken to have one locomotive put aside for preservation; as a result, EO 45 was selected for preservation and was offered to the Canterbury Railway Society for the storage of EO 45 and the other four locomotives. The CRS declined the offer, but it was then donated to the National Railway Museum of New Zealand and is currently stored on their connection to the Ferrymead Railway for storage until the museum is completed.

The other four electric locomotives were scrapped in May 2013.

== Accidents ==
The EO class has only ever been involved in one accident. On 21 May 1980, EOs 45, 51, and 74 were hauling a coal train from Otira to Arthur's Pass at around 4:00pm after the decision was made to suspend operations due to heavy rain earlier that day. As the train approached the Goat Creek bridge, it derailed into the swollen Otira River which had washed away 50 metres of track. Locomotive driver Owen Fitzgerald was trapped in the cab of leading locomotive EO 45 and subsequently drowned. His assistant was able to escape through one of the front windows which had broken in the derailment.

The three EO class locomotives were badly damaged, while the Midland line was closed until the locomotives could be recovered and the trackbed rebuilt. As a result, 1,800hp electric locomotive EW 159 was sent down from Wellington to replace the three EOs while they were rebuilt at Addington Workshops. This required two locomotive drivers to run the EW in conjunction with the two remaining EOs (EO 39 and EO 68) as the EW did not have multiple unit equipment. This combination produced a total of 3,000hp in comparison to the 1,800hp produced by three EOs.
