= NZR EO class =

NZR E^{O} class (1922)
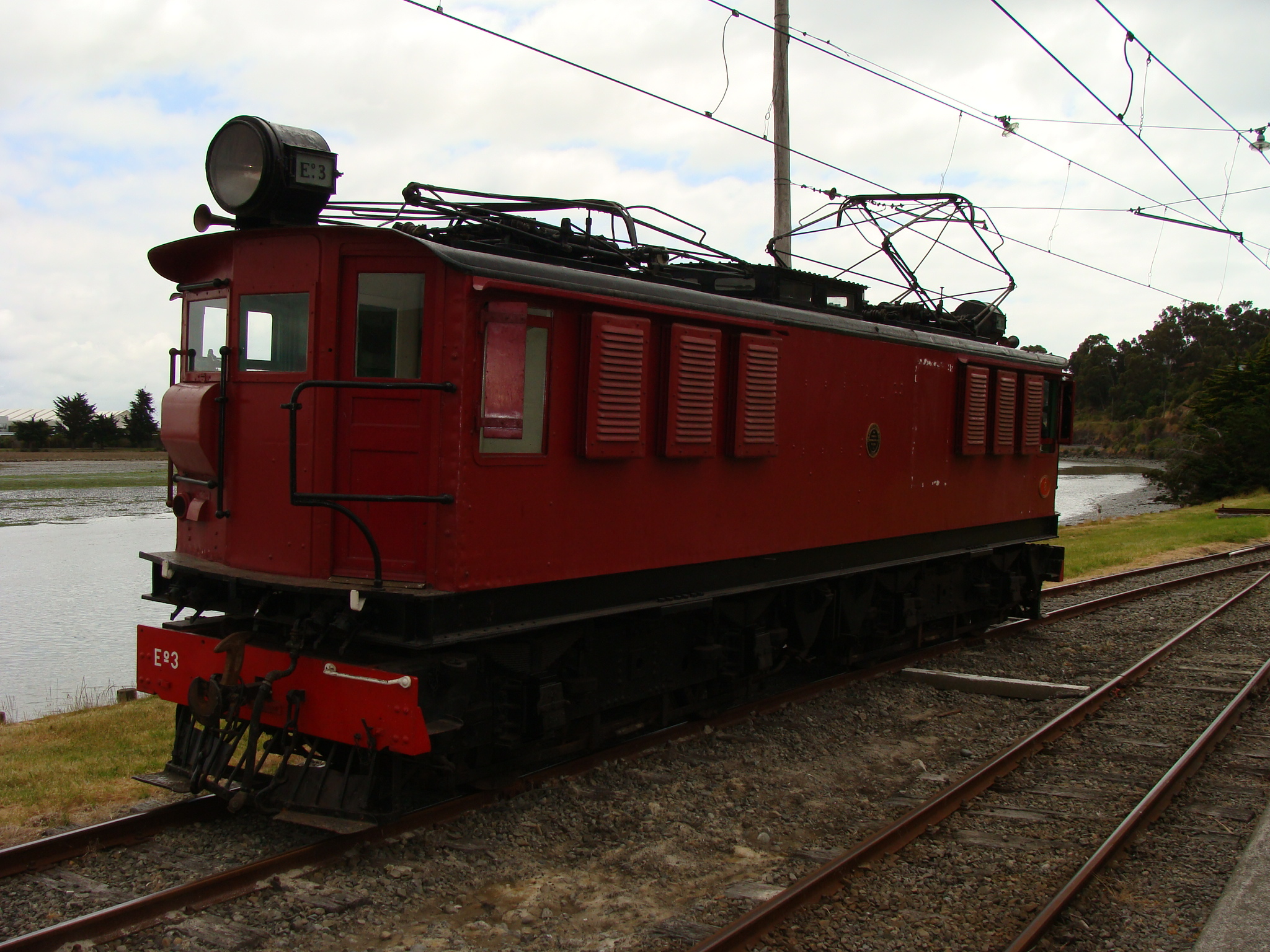
- E^{O} 3 running around a train at the Ferrymead Heritage Park.
Type and origin
- Power type: Electric
- Builder: English Electric; Dick Kerr Works, Preston, United Kingdom
- Build date: 1922
Specifications
- Configuration
  - UIC: Bo′Bo′
- Gauge: 3 ft 6 in (1,067 mm)
- Length: 11.7 metres (38 ft 5 in)
- Adhesive weight: 50.0 tonnes (49.2 long tons; 55.1 short tons)
- Loco weight: 50.0 tonnes (49.2 long tons; 55.1 short tons)
- Electric system/s: 1,500 V DC overhead lines
- Current pickup: Pantograph
- Traction motors: 4
Performance figures
- Maximum speed: 64 km/h (40 mph)
- Power output: 510 kW (680 hp)
- Tractive effort: 63 kN (14,000 lb_{f})
Career
- Operators: New Zealand Railways
- Class: E^{O}
- Number in class: 5
- Numbers: 2 - 6
- Locale: Midland Line between Otira and Arthurs Pass
- First run: 4 August 1923
- Last run: 23 April 1968
- Scrapped: 1969
- Disposition: 4 scrapped; 1 preserved

The NZR E^{O} class of 1923 were electric locomotives used on the steep Otira to Arthurs Pass section of the Midland Line in New Zealand. They were primarily needed for pulling trains through the 1 in 33 grade 8.5 km (5.3 mi) Otira Tunnel which was too long and too steep to allow steam locomotives to be used.

== Introduction ==
When the Otira tunnel was being built, steam locomotives were not considered for use in the tunnel, because smoke would build up in the tunnel and be difficult to clear.

The English Electric Company, of London, won the contract to supply six electric locomotives, the installation of overhead contact wires, and the building of a coal-fired electric power station at Otira (see Otira Tunnel. On 10 April 1923, five electric locomotives arrived, numbered E 2 to E 6 (1 was the Class E battery electric loco built in 1922).

They were later reclassified E^{O} to avoid confusion with the E^{C} class locomotives.

== Service ==
The locomotives coped well in service, and from 1942 it became standard practice to run three locomotives together with only two pantographs up, and have their pantographs linked by jumper cables. This was deemed dangerous and soon each locomotive ran with its own pantograph up.

This often resulted in heavy sparking, so they were run as a set of three locos in multiple-unit control with a two-man crew (an uphill driver and a downhill driver) and one driver sitting in each end cab. They had been altered in 1940 to a single cab design. Eastbound trains were reduced to smaller loads, usually with different train numbers. With 14 timetabled trips a day this was over 5,000 tons eastward daily. Westbound empties or loaded goods trains generally came down as complete trains.

They were referred to as "trams", a term carried over to the 1968 Toshiba replacements.

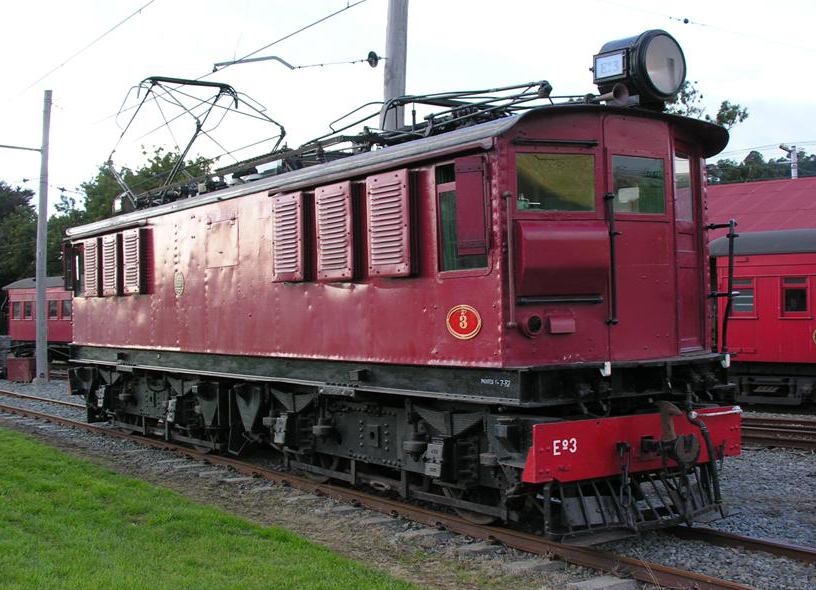
Another view of E^{O} 3

== Withdrawal and preservation ==
The class were replaced in April 1968 by the E^{A} locomotives (which were later re-designated as the EO class of 1968). All but one were scrapped.

E^{O} 3 was preserved by the Canterbury Railway Society. The locomotive arrived at the Ferrymead Heritage Park in 1972 and was restored to operating order in 1977. The locomotive has had the removed cab restored to the original style and carries its original number Eo 3 on that end of the locomotive. The loco received a Restoration Award from the National Federation of Railway Preservation Societies in 1996 and today can be seen operating on the Ferrymead Railway.
