= British and Intercolonial Exhibition =

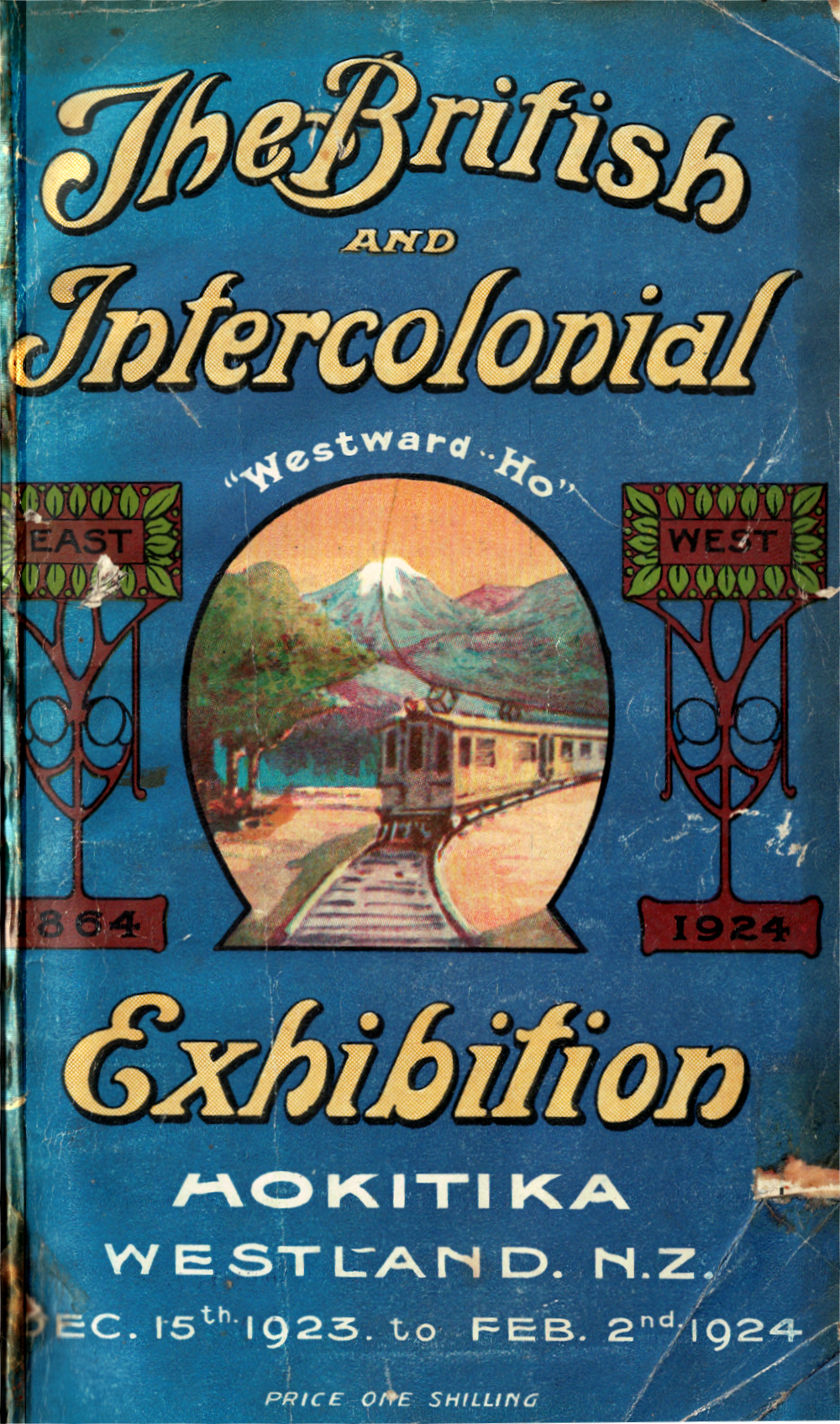
- Cover of exhibition guidebook

Overview
- BIE-class: Unrecognized exposition
- Name: British and Intercolonial Exhibition
- Motto: Westward-Ho
- Area: 40,000 square foot (3,700 m^{2})
- Organized by: John Jellicoe, 1st Earl Jellicoe patron, W.P.Massey vice patron

Location
- Country: New Zealand
- City: Hokitika, Westland
- Coordinates: 42°43′03″S 170°58′0″E

Timeline
- Opening: 15 December 1923
- Closure: 2 February 1924

The British and Intercolonial Exhibition was a small world's fair held between 15 December 1923 and 2 February 1924 in Hokitika, West Coast, New Zealand to mark the opening of the Otira Tunnel and the diamond jubilee of Westland Province.

The patron of the fair was the Governor-general John Jellicoe and the vice-patron then-Prime Minister William Massey.

40,000 square feet were allocated for the exhibition.

== Legacy ==
A statue of Summer was erected to commemorate the exhibition, and is now outside the Hokitika Museum.

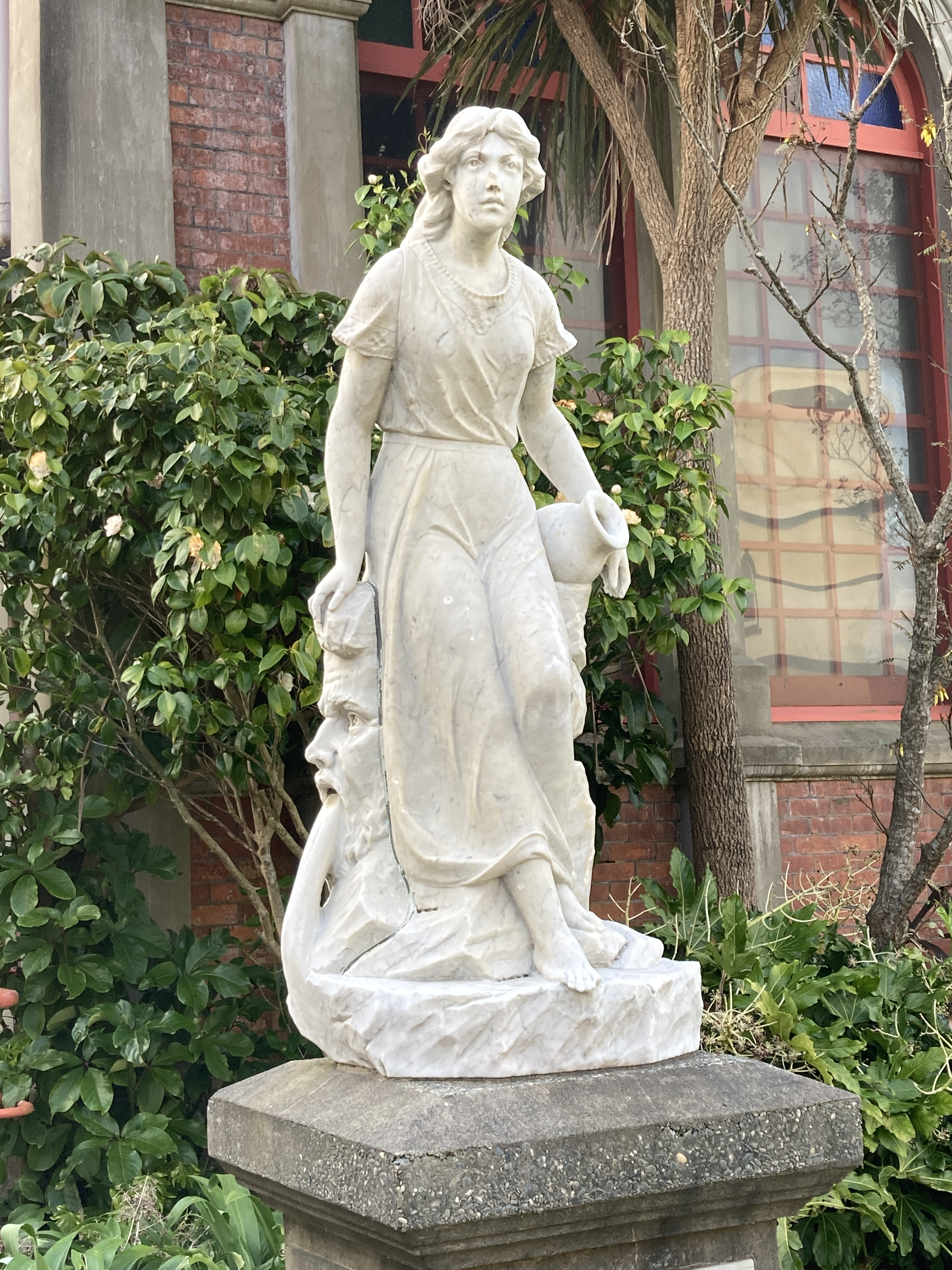
Summer (1925)

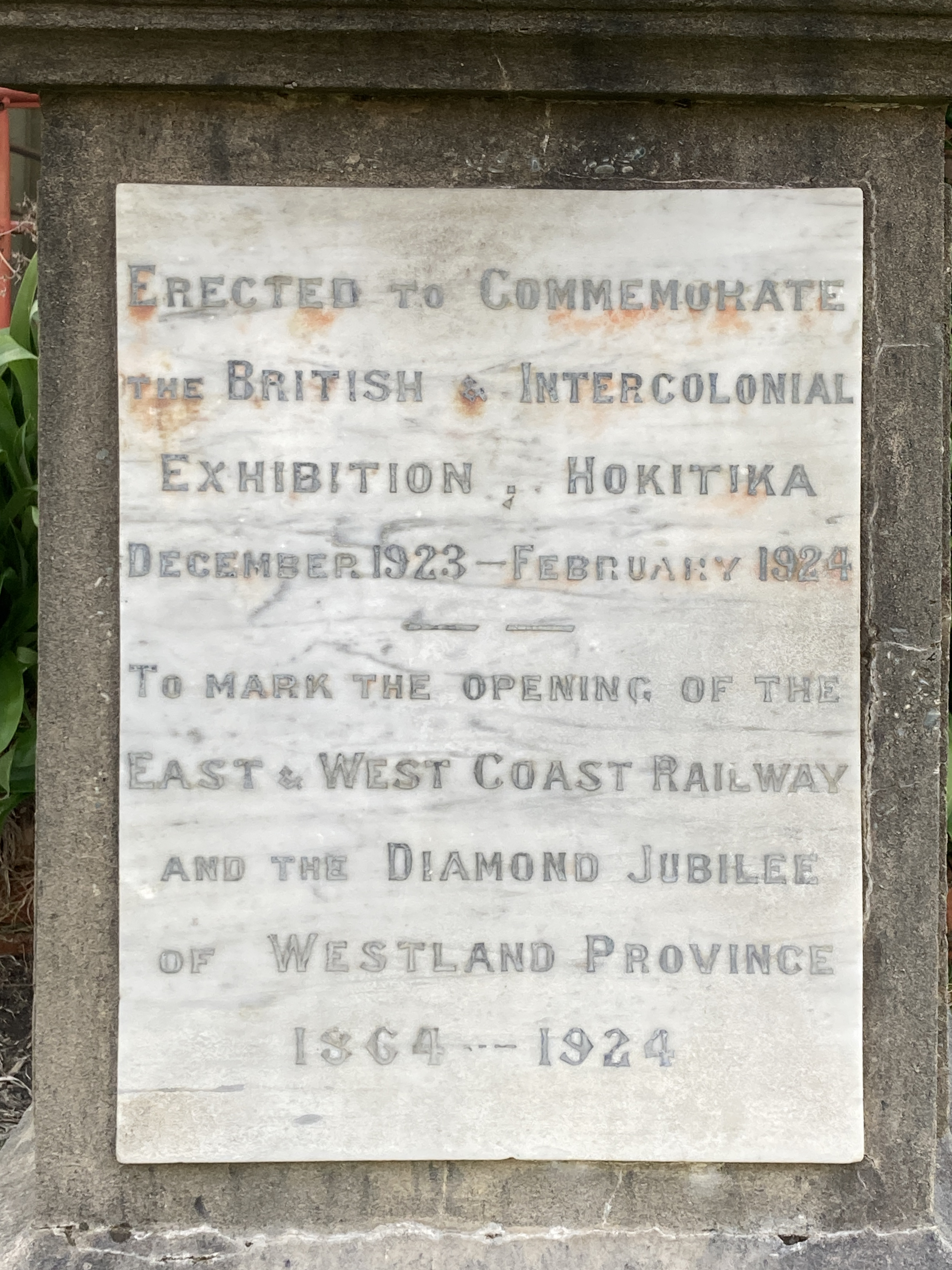
Commemorative plaque on statue
