= NZR ED class =

New Zealand ED class
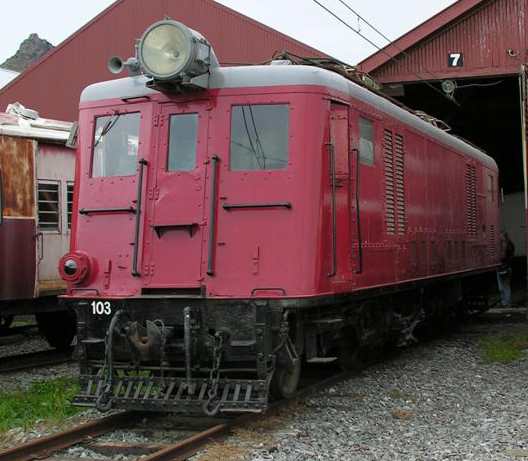
- ED 103 at Ferrymead
Type and origin
- Power type: Electric
- Builder: English Electric, UK (1), New Zealand Railways (Hutt Workshops - 7, Addington Workshops - 2)
Specifications
- Configuration
  - UIC: 1-Do-2 locomotives
- Gauge: 1,067 mm (3 ft 6 in)
- Length: 14.1 m (46 ft 3 in)
- Loco weight: 89 long tons (90 t; 100 short tons)
- Electric system/s: 1,500 V DC overhead lines
- Current pickup: Pantograph
Performance figures
- Maximum speed: 88 km/h (55 mph), restricted to 70 km/h (43 mph)
- Power output: 1 hour: 925 kW (1,240 hp), Continuous: 670 kW (898 hp)
- Tractive effort: 80 kN (18,000 lbf)
Career
- Operators: New Zealand Railways
- Number in class: 10
- Numbers: 101–110; TMS: 15, 21
- Locale: Wellington region
- First run: 10 May 1938
- Last run: March 1981
- Disposition: 8 scrapped 2 preserved

The NZR ED class locomotive (Note: Following the introduction of Traffic Monitoring System (TMS) in 1979, the class classification was capitalised, whereas previously the second letter was a smaller capital letter, that is E^{D}) is a type of electric locomotive used in Wellington, New Zealand. They were built by English Electric and the New Zealand Railways Department (NZR) between 1938 and 1940, and hauled mainly passenger trains on the Wellington region's 1500 V DC electrification, and banked freight trains on the steep section between Paekākāriki and Pukerua Bay.

The locomotives featured a unique wheel arrangement, 1-Do-2 under the UIC classification system, and incorporated a quill drive (the only type of locomotive to do so in New Zealand) to the driving wheels. A 19-tooth nickel-steel pinion drove a 71-tooth gear wheel.

They were found to be hard on the tracks, leading to speed restrictions on these locomotives and their replacement by E^{W} class locomotives on the Johnsonville Line after the introduction of the E^{W} class in 1952. The E^{W} class was considered more suited to passenger services than the E^{D} and replaced them on most passenger services on other lines.

== Classification ==
Like all other electric locomotives in New Zealand, the leading letter of the locomotive's classification is E. There are two predominant theories about how the E^{D} class acquired the second letter, D. The first is that it comes from the "Do" of its 1-Do-2 wheel arrangement. The second is from its original allocation to two locations, Wellington and Otira - Arthur's Pass, hence "duplicated". Official records do not confirm either theory.

== Introduction ==
New Zealand Railways purchased one E^{D} class locomotive in 1938 from English Electric, No. 101, for use on the newly opened Tawa Flat deviation, which incorporated two long tunnels. This locomotive was known as "The Sergeant" because of the three longitudinal stripes on each side of the body that were unique to this locomotive. The first locomotive was shipped to New Zealand in January 1938. It arrived from Liverpool on SS Cambridge in February 1938 and started trials to Johnsonville from 25 May 1938.

The tender required the supply of locomotive components for the other locomotives required, as it was thought desirable to carry out manufacture in New Zealand in NZR workshops. A further seven locomotives were assembled at the Hutt Workshops, and two at Addington Workshops for use on the Otira - Arthur's Pass section of the Midland Line. The design required them to haul 250-ton passenger trains at up to 55 mph (89 km/h), 500-ton freight trains at up to 45 mph (72 km/h) and start and accelerate to 20 mph (32 km/h) on the 1 in 57 up to Pukerua Bay, on an axle load limited to 16 tons. They had four motors, with a total one-hour rating of 1,240 hp (920 kW), rigidly mounted on the mainframe. Access to the cabs was originally through a door at the front, but later a door was put on the left of the cab. A corridor linked the cabs on one side, which had windows. Axleboxes were of cast steel, with SKF roller bearings. Like the DG and DH classes, they had Westinghouse A7EL air brakes.

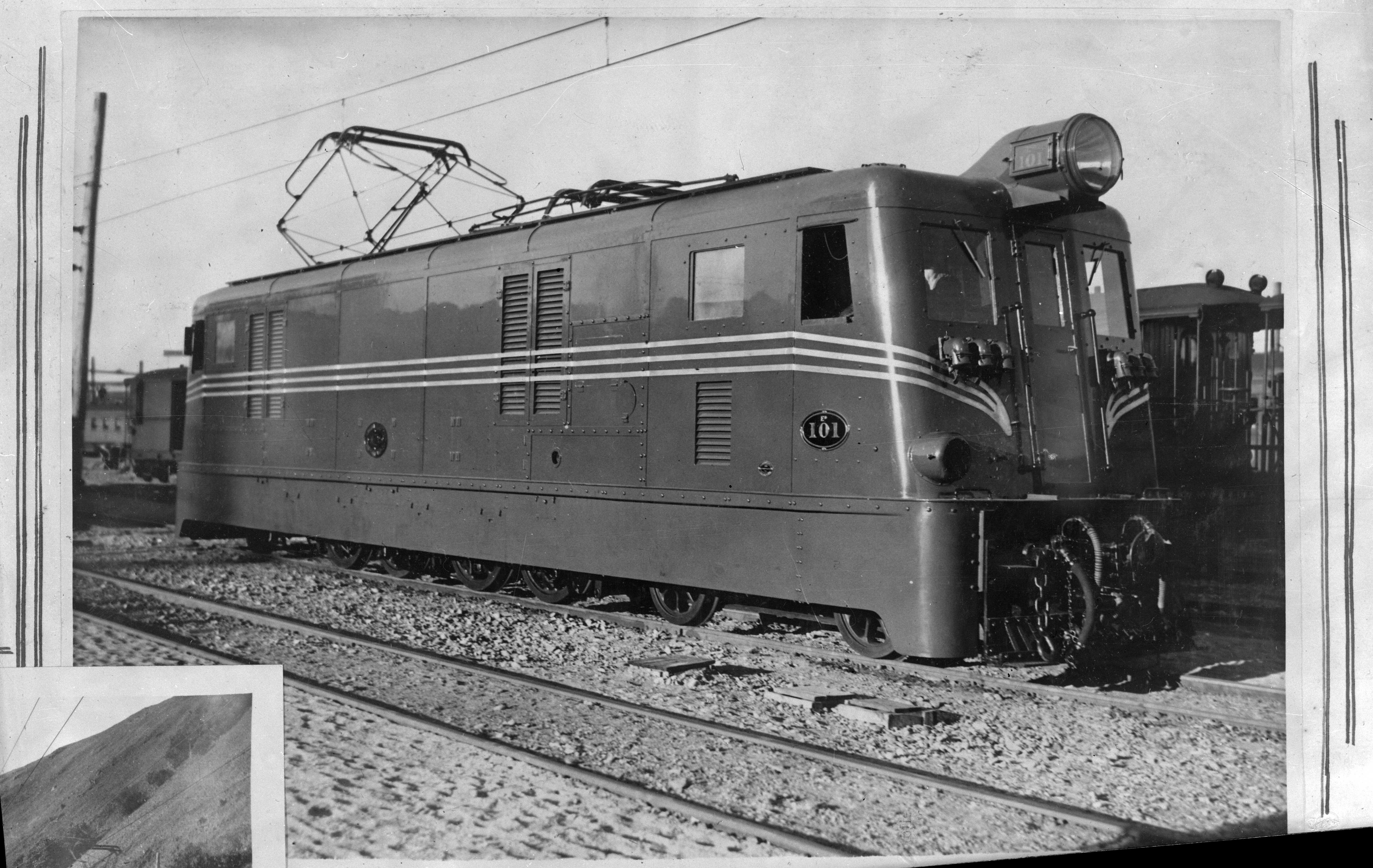
E^{D}101 with stripes and covered wheels

The first locomotive assembled at the Hutt Workshops was completed and undergoing trials in May 1939.

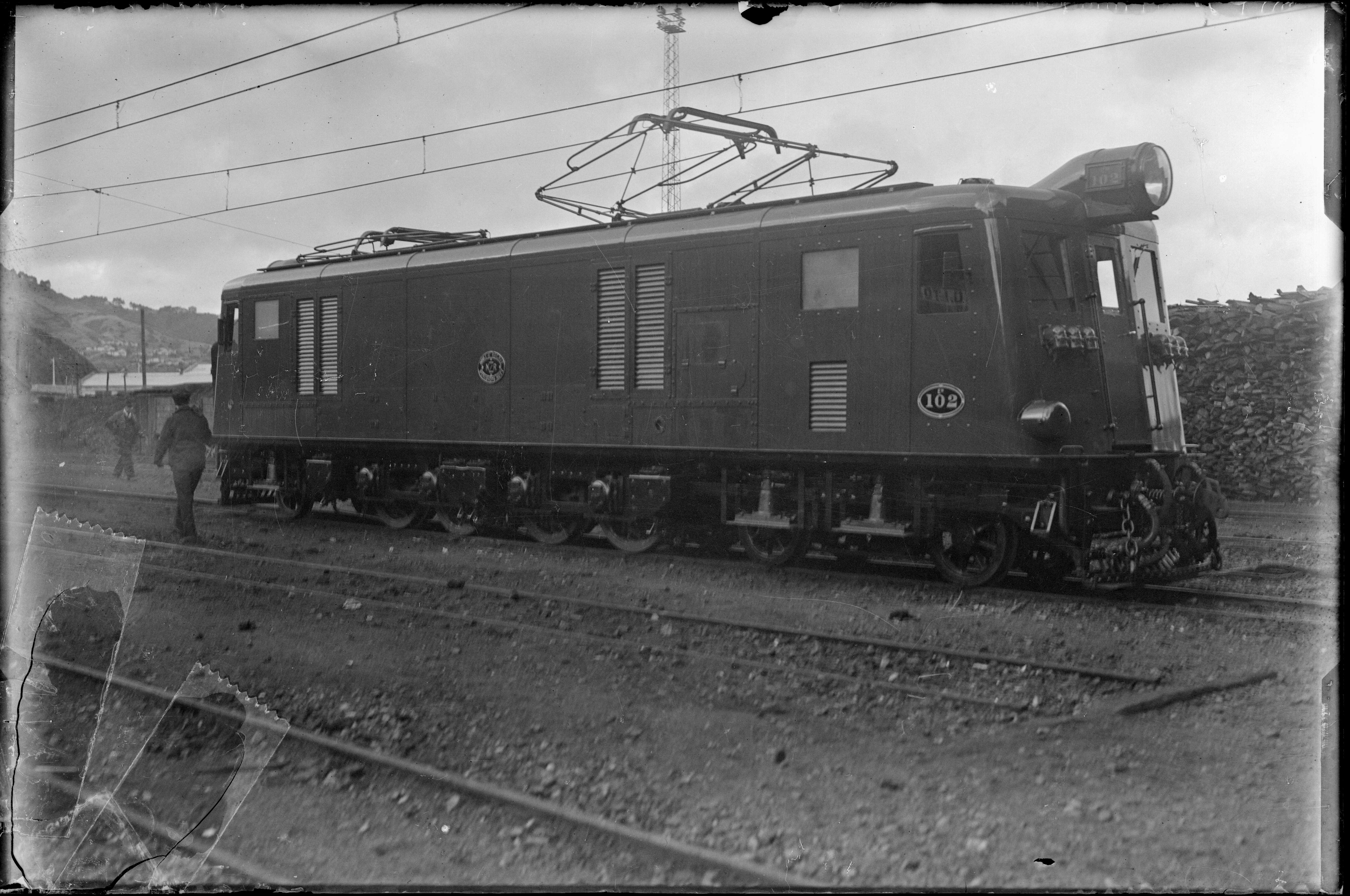
E^{D}102 - exposed wheels and no stripe

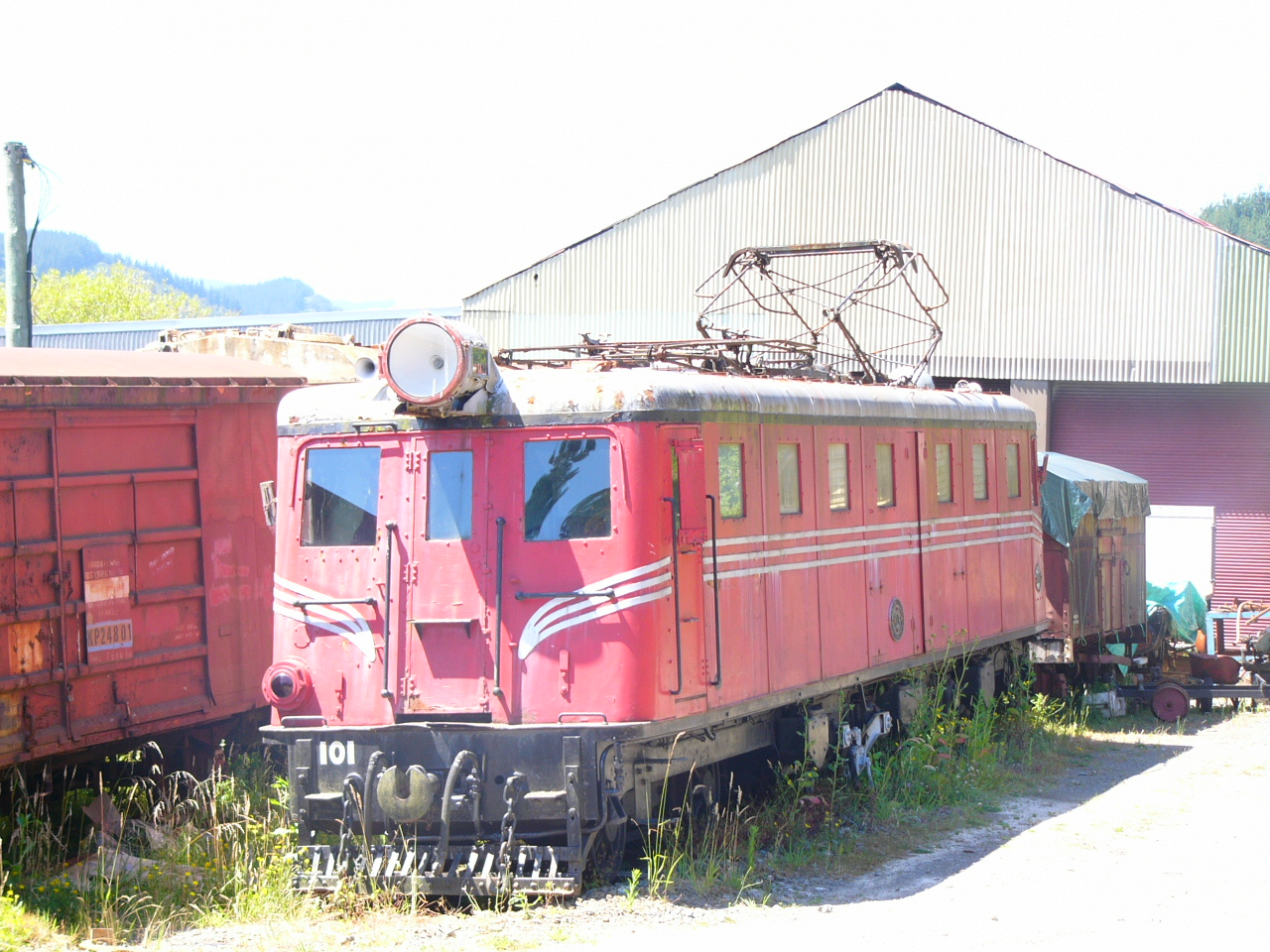
A corridor with windows linked the cabs.

By December 1939 the assembly of four locomotives at the Hutt Workshops had been completed, and they were expected to be operating to Paekakariki early in the new year.

The changeover was done gradually, and by July 1940 19 of 20 suburban trains were electric loco-hauled. By September 1940 they were hauling most trains, releasing most of the K^{A} class locomotives at Wellington for use elsewhere.

The two South Island locomotives were transferred north to Wellington in 1943. Their cast iron headstocks could not withstand the shock of shunting, and they could not dissipate the heat generated by rheostatic braking (although in Wellington air brakes were adequate).

=== Renumbering ===
With the introduction of the Traffic Monitoring System (TMS) in 1979, the two remaining locomotives were renumbered ED15 and ED21.

== Steam boilers ==
Each locomotive (E^{D} 101 to E^{D} 108; not E^{D} 109 and E^{D} 110) originally had oil-fired water-tube boilers for passenger carriage steam heaters, supplied by the Sentinel Waggon Works. The boiler could supply 1,250 pounds (570 kg) of steam per hour at a pressure of 40 pounds per square inch (280 kPa), and the water and oil tanks had capacities of 400 and 500 imperial gallons (1,800 and 2,300 L) respectively, so could steam for four hours before refilling. They were shut down or removed in 1950 due to "ongoing reliability problems"; air turbulence particularly in tunnels or when trains passed on double-track sections resulted in downdraughts affecting the boiler and in passenger discomfort in winter. In June 1951 the Deputy Mechanical Engineer said that the cost of fitting suitable boilers for the section from Paekākāriki to Wellington was not warranted as the carriages leaving Paekākāriki had residual heat, and a steam loco could pre-heat carriages before they left Wellington. In 1954-55 two boilers were installed in the Wellington station basement (and in 1958 one went to the NZR Road Services garage in Rotorua). The Chief Mechanical Engineer then wanted eight locos to have boilers for the 1955 winter, but parts were not available for the obsolete boilers and "refurbishing did not proceed". It was also found that the boilers were unreliable as the burners had been amended to be outside the normal operating specifications.

== Withdrawal ==
With the introduction of D^{A} class diesel locomotives on the Paekākāriki via Pukerua Bay to Wellington electrified section in 1967, eight of the class were withdrawn from service in 1969 and scrapped. The remaining two were kept in sporadic service until March 1981, when both locomotives were sold into preservation. There were plans to send them back to the Otira - Arthurs Pass section, but nothing came of this. E^{D} 101 is preserved by the Silver Stream Railway, while E^{D} 103 is preserved by the Canterbury Railway Society.

== Accidents ==
A porter-shunter at Johnsonville was accidentally killed in March 1940 when he stepped into the path of a train being shunted by an E^{D} locomotive.
