= Hutt Workshops =

New Zealand railway engineering facility

Coordinates: 41°13′47.61″S 174°54′37.54″E

- Type: Division of KiwiRail
- Industry: Railways
- Predecessor: Petone Workshops
- Founded: 1930
- Founder: New Zealand Railways
- Headquarters: Hutt City, New Zealand
- Area served: New Zealand
- Services: Heavy rail maintenance
- Number of employees: c. 180 (2011)
- Parent: KiwiRail

The Hutt Railway Workshops is a major railway engineering facility in the Lower Hutt suburb of Gracefield in the Wellington region of New Zealand's North Island. It is state-owned enterprise KiwiRail's only workshops, and was opened in 1930.

This facility is the central motive power maintenance operation and also maintains rolling stock.

== History ==
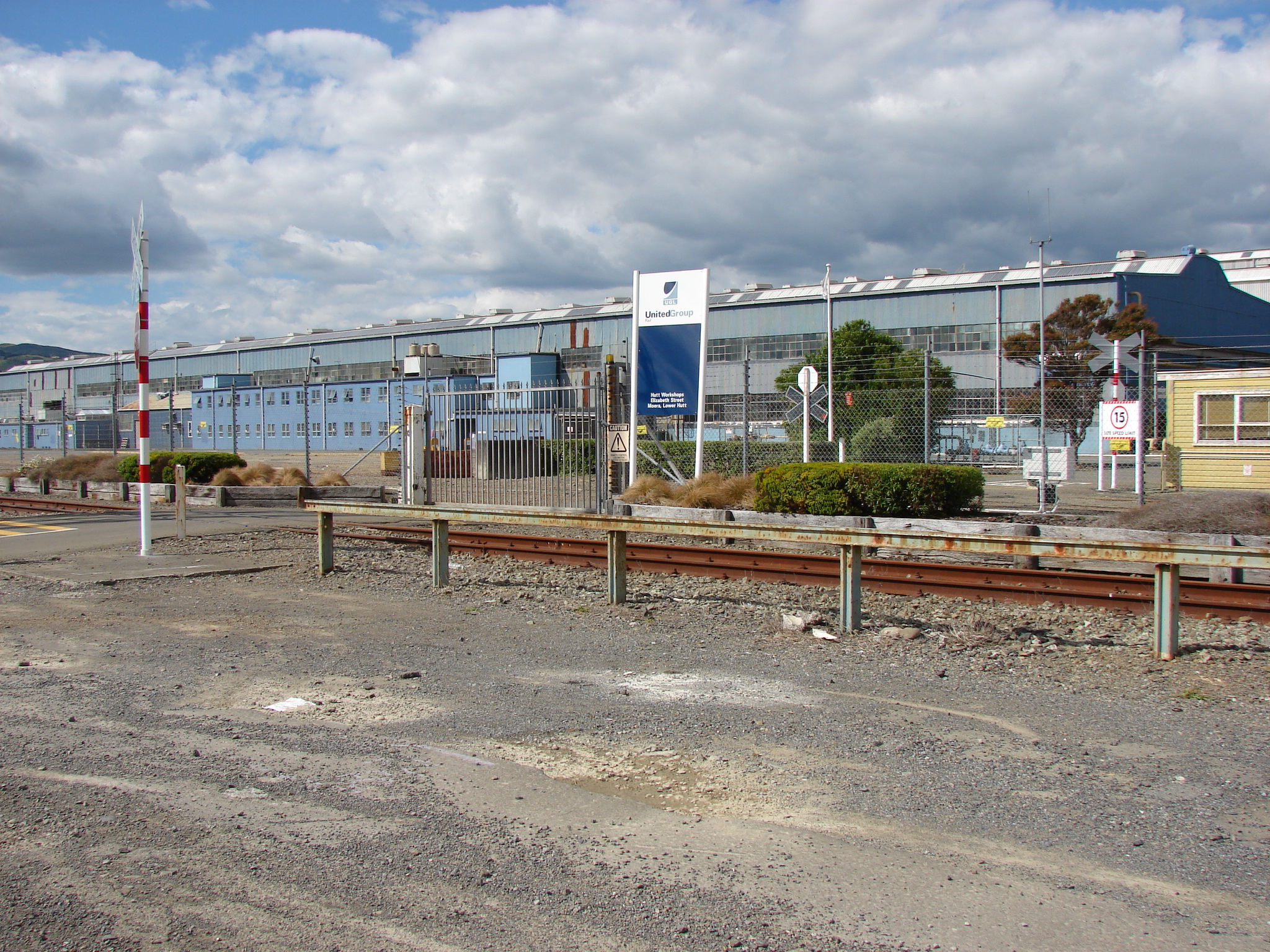
Hutt Workshops Elizabeth Street main entrance.

=== Predecessor ===
The Hutt Workshops were preceded by a workshops at Petone, adjacent to the railway station. It operated from 1876 when first used to store the H-class "Fell" locomotives until its replacement in 1929.

=== Decision to move ===
In the 1920s, the problems caused by the inadequacy of some railway workshop facilities was becoming more acute. In order to examine the issue, a Royal Commission was established in 1924 consisting of English railwaymen Sir Sam Fay and Sir Vincent Raven. One recommendation of their report read: "In the North Island the shops at Napier, Whangārei, and East Town, so far as locomotive work is concerned, might be closed down, the necessary repairs being carried out at Petone and Newmarket."

A later report from the Minister of Railways in 1928 read, in part: "It was found possible by extension to the existing buildings at Hillside and Addington to carry out improvements that would suffice for many years to come, but the provision in the two main North Island shops was hopelessly inadequate, and consequently land had to be acquired at Lower Hutt and Otahuhu, and modern shops constructed thereon."

The original intention was for Otahuhu to assume responsibility for locomotive works, and for Hutt to be the car and wagon workshop. This had to be reversed when it was discovered that the land on which Otahuhu had been built was not suitable for the heavy machinery required to work on the locomotives.

=== Replacement at Woburn ===
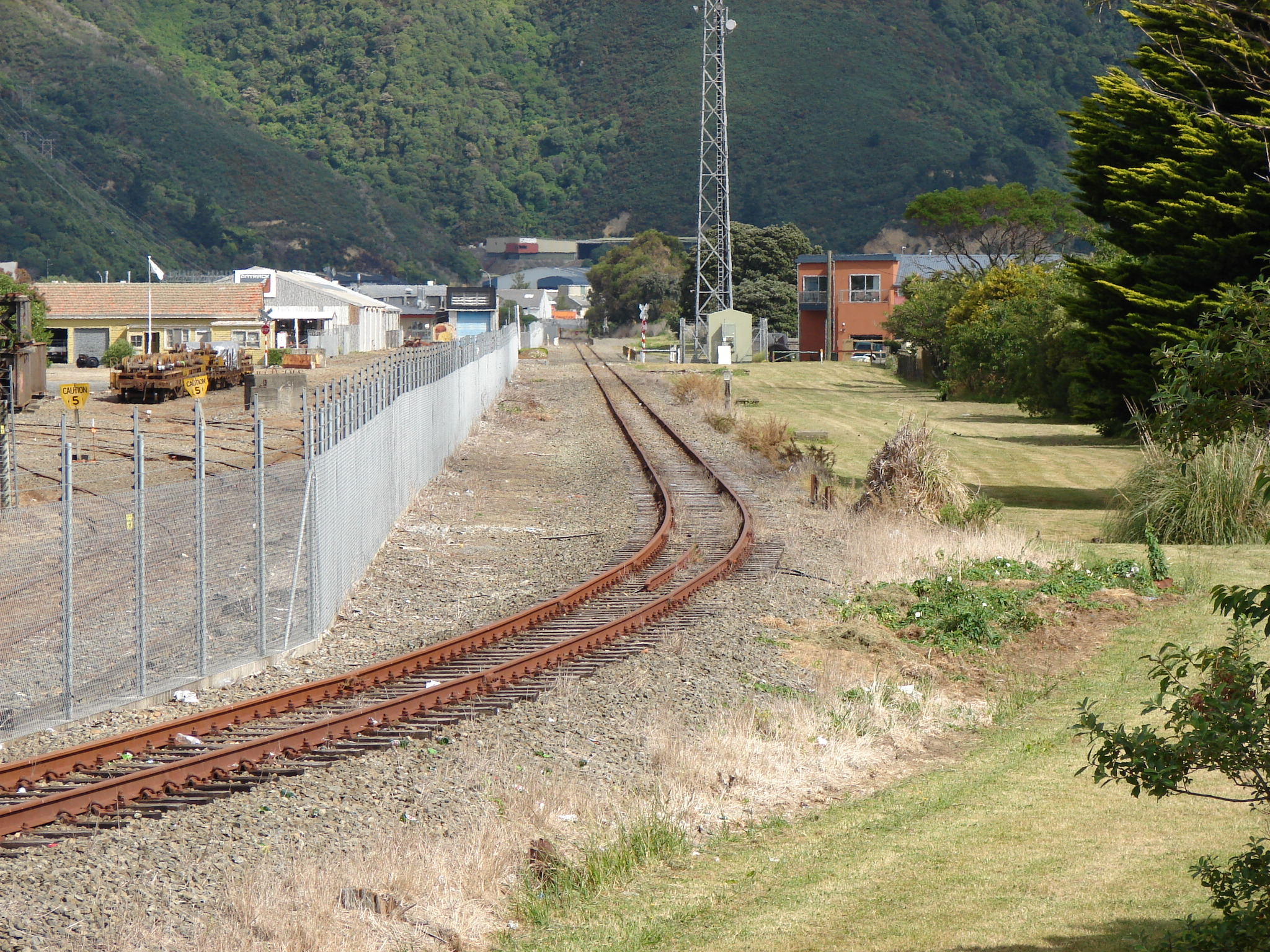
Gracefield Branch line running past the Hutt Workshops yard.

After the passing of the Hutt Valley Lands Settlement Act in 1925, 253 hectares (625 acres) of land was purchased for development, of which 12 ha (29 acres) was for the railway, 32 ha (80 acres) for the workshops, 55 ha (135 acres) for roads and other amenities, and 177 ha (438 acres) for housing. The new workshops were to be served by the Hutt Industrial Line, which would also provide rail access to other industrial developments in the area.

The plant was completed in 1929, with an official opening happening the following year. They were fitted out with then all new modern equipment, including some of the most modern and recent machines in the Petone Workshops, and capable of handling the building of new locomotives as well as other general overhaul and repair work.

One of the biggest improvements from the point of view of the staff was the new ventilation system. At Petone, ventilation was a rather primitive affair, relying on windows and roof vents, as well as circular stoves placed at strategic locations around the buildings. This had replaced an earlier and even more basic system of steam pipes around the machines. At Hutt, a far more effective system was installed by Messrs. A. & T. Burt, which involved a series of pipes throughout the buildings through which, with the aid of motor-driven fans, cool air from outside or warm air from steam boilers could be circulated.

The first locomotives to be produced were "Prairie" type "C" shunting engines, of which 12 were built at the Hutt Workshops. They were supposed to replace many of the older types of steam locomotives that were still in service, but ended up hauling Wellington suburban passenger services. They were the last steam locomotives to work the Wellington yards or wharves before the introduction of diesel locomotives.

After the C-class locomotives came the K class 4-8-4s, of which class leader K 900 became rather well known for its most public departure from the workshops in November 1932. The last steam locomotives to be produced at Hutt were Ka class locomotives 958 and 959 in 1950, though maintenance work on them continued into the mid-1960s.

From the 1930s until the 1980s Hutt Workshops had responsibility for assembling then maintaining Wellington's fleet of electric locomotives. The first to enter service were the ED class in 1938, followed by the EW class in 1952. All were withdrawn from regular service by the mid-1980s.

=== Modern developments ===
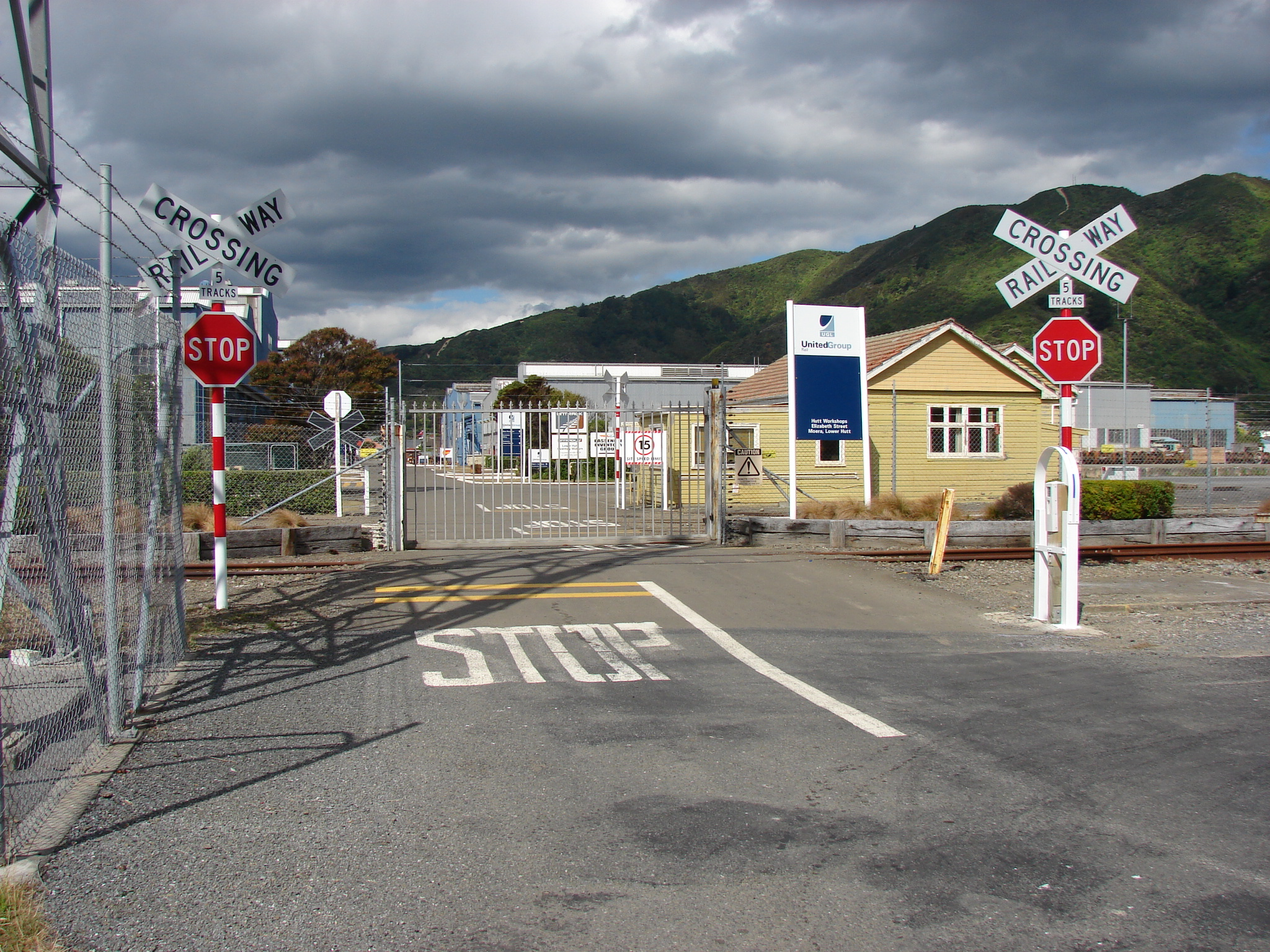
Main entrance.

Various restructuring exercises in the late 1980s and 1990s resulted in the loss of several functions and buildings from the Hutt Workshops site. For example, the former workshops administration building was relocated to Greytown in Wairarapa and renovated to become The White Swan Hotel and restaurant.

The facility has experienced several changes in ownership. It was originally constructed, owned and operated by the government's Railways Department, later the Railways Corporation from 1982, and then New Zealand Rail Limited from 1991. In 1993, New Zealand Rail was privatised, and renamed Tranz Rail in 1995, before itself being bought out by Toll New Zealand in 2003, which was then re-nationalised as KiwiRail in 2008.

On 1 April 2002, Alstom took over the operation of the Hutt Workshops on a seven-year contract to maintain Tranz Rail's fleet of locomotives. Three years later, United Group announced on 16 September 2005 that it had completed the acquisition of Alstom's transport operations in New Zealand and Australia, including the Hutt Workshops. Following the acquisition of Toll's rail operations by the New Zealand Government, ownership of Hutt Workshops was transferred, along with Toll NZ's rail and ferry assets, to KiwiRail on 1 July 2008. United Group Rail remained the operator of the facility until its contract expired on 22 March 2009, when KiwiRail assumed full responsibility for the facility from the following day.

Whilst KiwiRail is the largest user of the workshops, KiwiRail Infrastructure also has a presence on site. Occasionally, work is carried out at the workshops on behalf of other railway organisations, such as heritage railway groups, or suburban railway operations. For example, the workshops refurbished several KiwiRail EO class electric locomotives leased to the Greater Wellington Regional Council. These locomotives were all used to haul consists of SE class carriages on the Wellington suburban railway network, a temporary measure before the arrival of new electric multiple units in 2010.

== Locomotives manufactured at Hutt Workshops ==
- C (12)
- E (1) (at Petone)
- L (3) (at Petone)
- K (30)
- K^{A} (35)
- DC (5 rebuilt from DA)
- DQ (16 rebuilt)
- E^{D} (7 assembled)
- Standard (Aotea) Railcars (6)
- Wairarapa Railcars (6 for Rimutaka Incline)
