= Otira Tunnel =

Railway tunnel in New Zealand

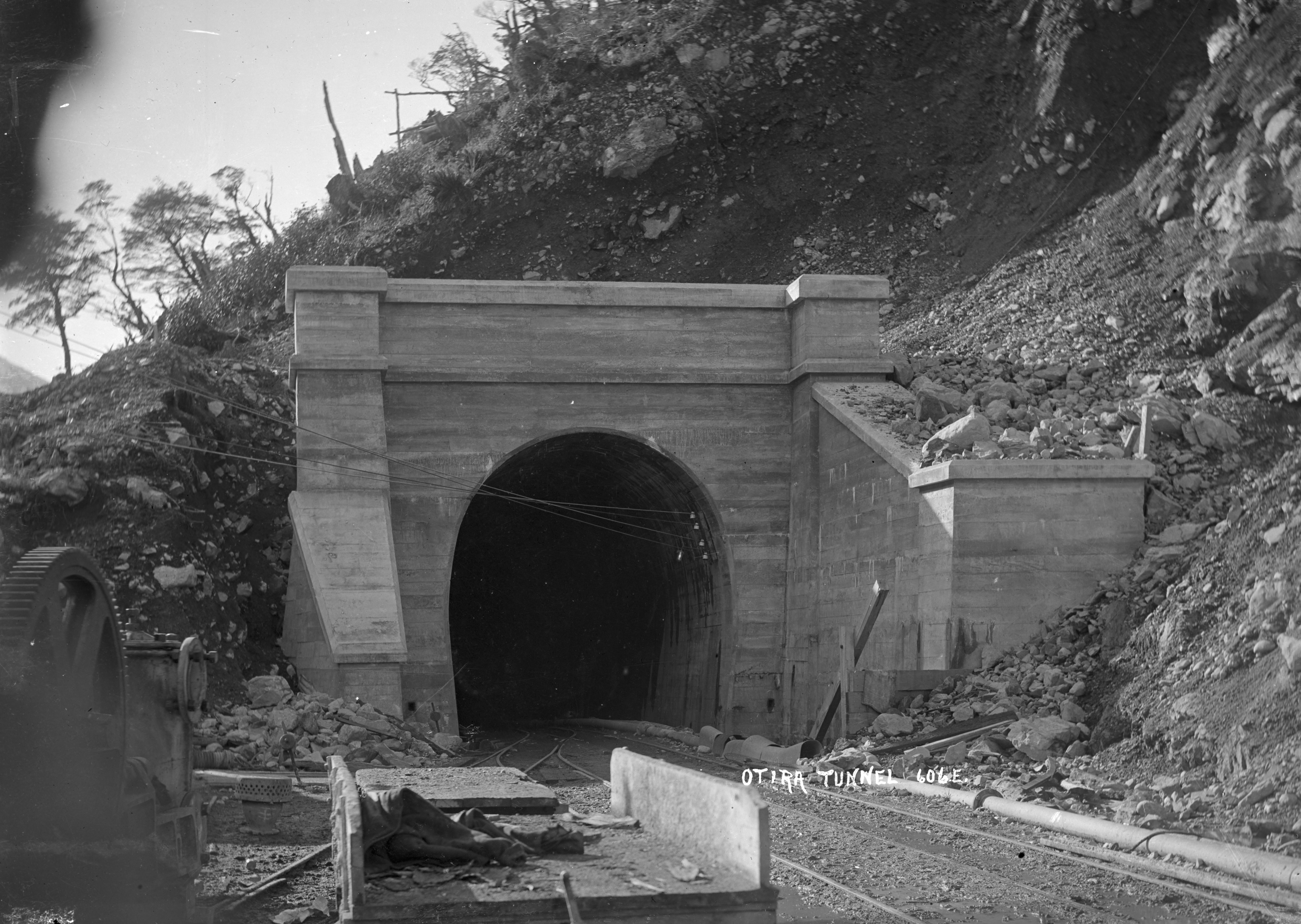
- Otira Tunnel during construction, c. 1910
- Interactive map of Otira Tunnel

Overview
- Line: Midland Line
- Location: Southern Alps, South Island, New Zealand
- Coordinates: 42.9014°S 171.5569°E
- Start: Otira, West Coast (42.8625°S 171.5487°E)
- End: Arthur's Pass, Canterbury (42.9392°S 171.5630°E)

Operation
- Opened: 4 August 1923
- Operator: KiwiRail, The Great Journeys of New Zealand
- Character: Single bore rail tunnel

Technical
- Length: 8,566 m (28,104 ft)
- Track gauge: 1,067 mm (3 ft 6 in)
- Operating speed: 40 km/h (25 mph)
- Max elevation: 2,435 ft (742 m)
- Min elevation: 1,586 ft (483 m)
- Grade: 1/33

The Otira Tunnel is a railway tunnel on the Midland Line in the South Island of New Zealand, between Otira and Arthur's Pass. It runs under the Southern Alps from Arthur's Pass to Otira – a length of over 8.5 kilometres (5.3 mi). The gradient is mainly 1 in 33, and the Otira end of the tunnel is over 250 m (820 ft) lower than the Arthur's Pass end.

== History ==
=== Route selection ===
An 1883 Royal Commission looked at options for extending the railway from Brunnerton to the east coast. It considered routes over Arthur's Pass and Harper Pass, as well as less feasible options over Lewis Pass and Lake Lyndon. It recommended Arthur's Pass as the best approach. The government amended the 1881 Railways Construction and Land Act in 1884 to enable the transfer of land for the project, and the Midland Railway Company was formed to contract for the project.

The Midland Railway Company investigated alternatives to a long tunnel, but a railway line over the pass with gradients of 1 in 50 on both sides was found to not be affordable, and there was uncertainty whether the steep hillsides would be stable enough. Other options for a line over the pass were a cable-hauled system or a line of 1 in 15 gradient using either the Fell system or a rack railway using the Abt system (or even an S-shaped tunnel under Mount Rolleston). The company favoured the Abt system, but the government preferred the Fell system as used on the Rimutaka Incline. Finance for the company fell through in 1894 and they stopped operating.

After the collapse of the Midland Railway Company, the government took possession of the partially-completed railway line between Canterbury and the West Coast in 1895. The Public Works Department completed the line to Ōtira in 1899. The next challenge was to connect the railway across the incredibly steep terrain of the main divide.

After drawing up a shortlist of possible routes, the government consulted American engineer Virgil Bogue, who recommended a 6.2 kilometres (3.9 mi) tunnel at a 1-to-32 grade. After further consideration with government engineers, Bogue and planners finally settled on an 8.2 kilometres (5.1 mi) tunnel at a 1-to-33 grade. The proposed tunnel would begin just south of the Devil's Punchbowl at Arthur's Pass, and would emerge close to the Rolleston River at Ōtira.

=== Construction ===
A contract to build the tunnel in five years was let to the engineering firm of John McLean and Sons who started at the Otira end in 1908, using the "drill and blast" method. Construction from the Arthur's Pass side began a few months later. Due to rising costs driven by union demands, McLeans asked to be relieved from the contract in 1912. The government could find no other tenderers, so the work was taken over by the Public Works Department. The government considered halting construction in World War I, but the Imperial Government requested that work should continue in case the German navy blockaded the West Coast ports used for coal shipment. The breakthrough was on 20 July 1918, and a celebration was held on 21 August 1918 by the Minister of Public Works Sir William Fraser.

The tunnel was constructed by blasting and drilling out a heading 2.5 metres (8 ft 2 in) high and 3 metres (9.8 ft) wide, which was then widened to the final size. The arched ceiling was formed of concrete blocks pre-cast at purpose-built buildings at either end of the tunnel, while the walls were sealed with concrete up to 24 inches (610 mm) thick. The final concrete block was installed in September 1921.

In May 1910 a cave-in occurred where men were working. Four men were seriously injured and transported to Greymouth; one would later die. Two tunnelers were left trapped inside the tunnel, with rescuers drilling in from the side for two days before they could be rescued. Overall, there were at least 8 fatalities during construction, with a few deaths of workers unrelated to the work.

Working condition were extremely hard, with union leader Bob Semple saying, "the men were wet through by halfway through the shift, and so caustic was the water from the roof that men would get terrible sores." Unions are credited with achieving better medical care and wages for the workers, though their demands exceeded what McLean and Sons could afford, and forced them to give up the contract. Pay disputes continued even after the government took over the project. Workers' families joined them, and the community around the project grew rapidly. Women had a crucial role in supporting the tunnel workers.

When the Otira tunnel opened on 4 August 1923, it was the seventh longest tunnel in the world and the longest in the British Empire. The tunnel was officially opened by Prime Minister William Massey. Its opening was marked by the British and Intercolonial Exhibition.

=== Electrification ===
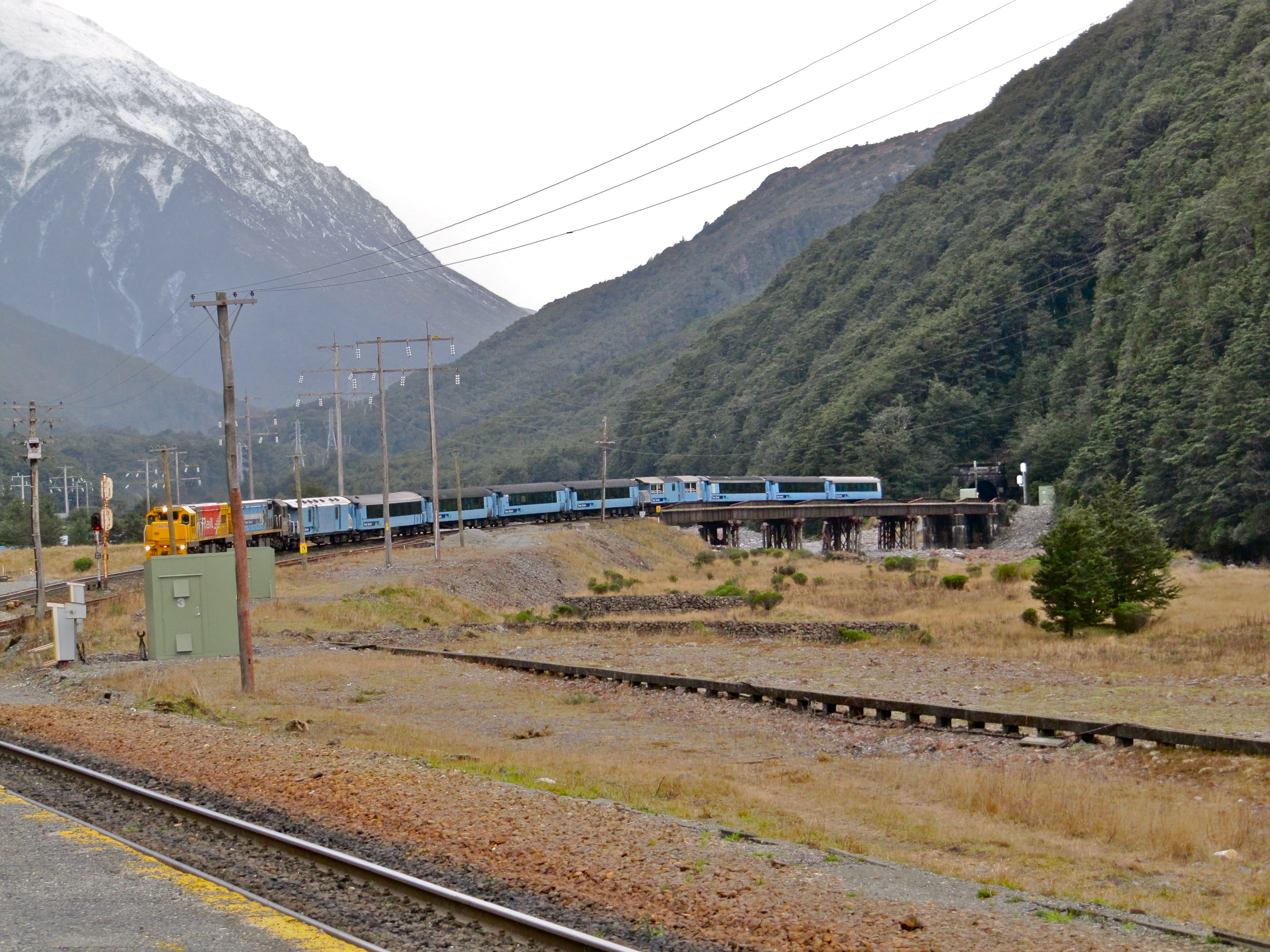
TranzAlpine and Otira Tunnel from Arthur's Pass station.

The tunnel dimensions were 4.72 metres (15 ft 6 in) high and 4.27 metres (14 ft 0 in) wide at rail level, increasing to 4.57 metres (15 ft 0 in) at the widest point. Because of its length and gradient, gases such as carbon dioxide and carbon monoxide could easily build up, potentially making the tunnel both unhealthy for the train's occupants and unworkable with steam engines. Hence the tunnel was electrified with a 1500 V DC overhead system.

Tenders for electrification of the 14 km Otira-Arthur's Pass section through the tunnel were received in 1920 from the National Electric Company of New York, and English Electric of London; English Electric obtained the order for five locomotives plus a battery-powered shunting locomotive No. E1 (which was scrapped in 1930 because of the cost of storage batteries), plus power plant and overhead catenary (14 km main line plus 8 km of yard sidings).

The coal-fired power plant of 3,000 kW output was for a maximum load of 1,500 kW averaged over half an hour with peaks up to 1,875 kW. The boilers had to build up from low pressure to maximum in 2 to 3 minutes when a train started. The estimated total energy was 1,029,000 kWh (kilowatt hours) per annum plus 10% for train lighting and loco controls and 160,000 kWh for workshops and villages at Arthur's Pass and Otira.

In 1941, the power plant was replaced by a mercury arc rectifier station at the Otira portal using power supplied from the Coleridge Power Station by an 11 kV line. In the 1970s, the mercury arc rectifiers were replaced by silicon diode rectifiers and the double catenary overhead was replaced by a single catenary.

In 1916, the option of electrifying the 100 km from Jacksons to Springfield had been considered, and with increased coal traffic in the 1950s and again in the 1980s electrification to Jacksons or even Moana was considered. Proposals of the 1950s envisaged electrification at 25kV 50 Hz; later proposals would have used surplus EF class locomotives from the North Island Main Trunk converted to 11 kV operation. But none of these plans proceeded.

Locomotives used were first the EO class, and then from 1968 the EA class (itself later reclassified EO). In 1988, trials began using DX class locomotives instead of electric locomotives. While the trials were unsuccessful, it was found in trials held in 1991 that upgrading the DX class locomotives with new air intakes and putting extraction fans on the Otira end of the tunnel could allow for the replacement of the electrification.

Because of the increasing age of the electric plant and the availability of upgraded DX class diesel locomotives, the electrification was decommissioned in July 1997 and the equipment removed. This marked the end of electrification in the South Island.

=== Post-electrification ===
In July 2013, partly as a result of the Pike River Mine disaster, concerns about the fire risk in the tunnel prompted KiwiRail to begin bussing passengers from Arthur's Pass to Otira, rather than traversing the tunnel. Over the following months, additional fire suppression equipment was installed in the tunnel and carriages, and passenger transit resumed in November. The buildup of soot and coaldust on the tunnel walls continued to pose a hazard; in 2018 the tunnel was thoroughly cleaned. The cleaning required the construction of a specialised water treatment plant. Beginning in 2021, an emulsion is now sprayed automatically onto coal trucks entering the tunnel, to suppress coal dust from being distributed in the tunnel.

In 2023, KiwiRail hosted a special commemorative TranzAlpine service to celebrate the tunnel's centenary.

== Modern operation ==
Because the tunnel was only designed for electrified locomotives, ventilation of engine fumes for KiwiRail's modern diesel locomotives is a problem. To overcome the fume problem, a combination of a door and fans are used, similar to that used in the Cascade Tunnel in the United States of America, which was also once electrified. After a train enters the tunnel from the Otira end, an air-lock door closes off the entrance, and a large fan extracts the fumes behind the train. Once the fumes have been extracted, the door is reopened. Because of the fumes, the TranzAlpine's observation cars are closed for the trip through the tunnel, and passenger journeys are restricted to only AK class carriages. In 2013 the Rail and Maritime Transport Union recommended re-electrifying the tunnel to reduce the risk that fumes pose to KiwiRail staff.

The steep grade and poor ventilation presents a challenge for modern diesel locomotives. Additional power is required for the uphill climb to prevent overheating, and additional braking is required for the descent. Due to this, the use of as many as four banker locomotives is required for trains moving through the tunnel.

There is continuous radio coverage for KiwiRail's VHF operation radios inside the tunnel.

As of 2013, the majority of journeys through the tunnel are hauling coal from the west coast to Lyttelton port, with as many as 7 or 8 return journeys per day. Each coal train carries a total of 2,160 tonnes of coal in 30 uncovered wagons. There are also two daily return freight journeys, and the TranzAlpine passenger return service.
