= Ohai Railway Board =

Private railway line in New Zealand

Coordinates: 45.9995°S 168.0306°E

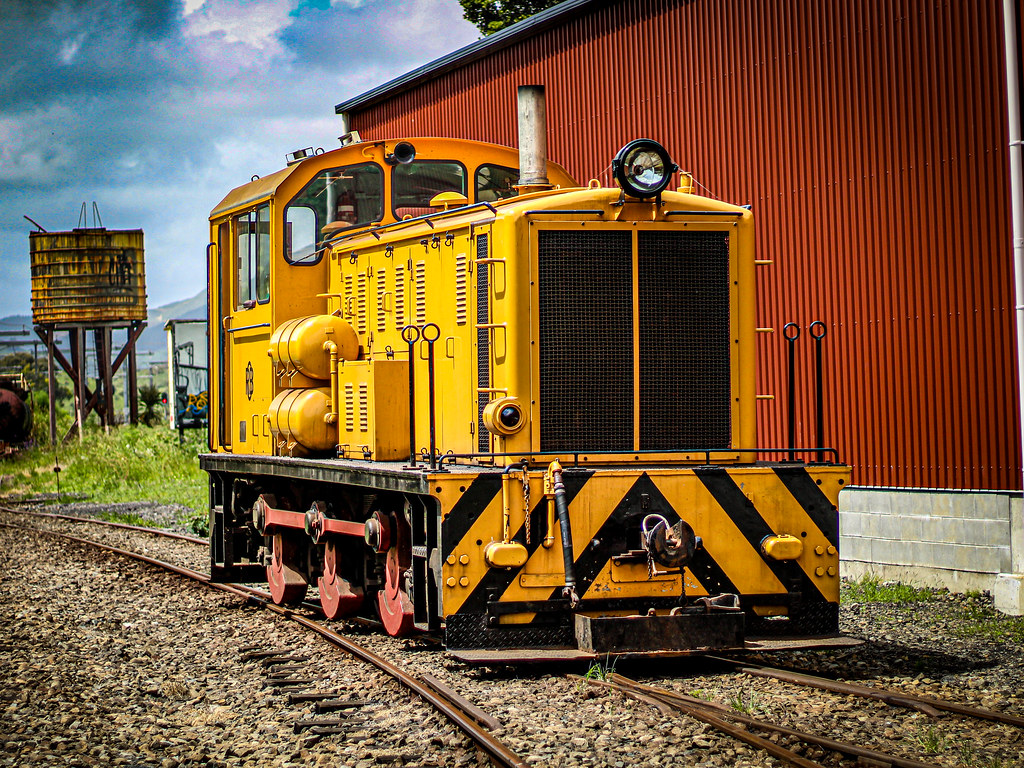
Ohai Railway Board no2 Type C, a diesel shunting locomotive, at the depot of railway preservation group Steam Incorporated in Paekākāriki on the 29th of November 2025.

The Ohai Railway Board (ORB) was a short railway in Southland, New Zealand. The railway line itself still exists as the Ohai branch line, but the ORB was dissolved in 1990, and in 1992 the Southland District Council sold the board's assets to New Zealand Rail Limited.

== History ==
=== Construction ===
In the 1870s, coal was discovered in Ohai. Mines opened in the area, mostly with their own 2 ft gauge railways to carry coal.

Coal production boomed in the area in 1882 when a private spur railway line was built by the Nightcaps Coal Company from the terminus of the New Zealand Government Railways Wairio Branch at Wairio to Nightcaps to provide more efficient transport of coal.

In 1916 a proposal was made to build another line to coal interests around Ohai. The construction of this line was fiercely opposed by the Nightcaps Coal Company, fearing a loss of business. The Ohai Railway Board (ORB) was formed under the District Railways Act 1877. Much like the Port Chalmers Railway Company Limited in Dunedin, the ORB was formed with the backing of local government, and because the central government declined to extend its line. In the case of the ORB, this was the railway line from Wairio to the new coalfields at Ohai. Local landowners, mainly farmers, funded the extension through mortgages against their own properties. After two Royal Commissions, construction was approved in July 1919 with a deviation through Morley Village, considered part of Nightcaps.

The first section of the line, including the part serving Morley Village, opened on 1 September 1920. Ohai was reached four years later. The Nightcaps Coal Company ceased to operate, and they handed over their railway line to the Railways Department, who dismantled it in 1926 as the Ohai branch line was capable of catering for traffic from Nightcaps. In 1932, Parliament passed a local enactment for the ORB, the Ohai Railway Board Act 1932.

In 1934, this line was further extended beyond Ohai to Birchwood, but the terminus was reverted to Reeds in 1956, with a brief reopening of the line from Reeds to Morely in 1960, before the terminus again reverted to Ohai.

=== Demise ===
Economic reform in the 1980s ultimately led to the demise of the ORB. One of the ORB's members, the State Mines Department, became Coal Corporation on 1 April 1987. According to one source, the Coal Corporation and the New Zealand Railways Corporation (NZR) "put pressure" on the ORB to amalgamate with NZR. Following the 1989 local government reforms the Wallace County Council was amalgamated into the Southland County Council, forming the Southland District Council. The District Council took over running of the ORB from 1989, and the board was formally dissolved on 31 May 1990. ORB's operations were incorporated into the national rail network on 1 June 1990, and from then on the New Zealand Railways Corporation operated trains on the line.

In 1992 the Southland District Council sold the remaining assets of the ORB to New Zealand Rail Limited, (the rail and ferry operations of the Railways Corporation, which was split off from the corporation in 1991) who paid $1.2 million for the line and other assets of the ORB. The proceeds of this sale were used to form the Ohai Railway Board Trust, which grants money to local projects.

From 1992 the entire line was called the Ohai Line, and was one of the very few survivors of a formerly extensive rural branch line network. In 2023, the line was extensively damaged by a storm. The sole customer, Bathurst Resources, then announced that the last mine it operates in the region (Takitimu) will close in 2027, with the railing of coal from Invercargill coming to an end in 2026.

== Board membership ==
The 1932 Ohai Railway Board Act defined the membership of the ORB as:

- the District Manager of State Coal Mines at Ohai, who shall be Chairman of the Board:
- the member of the Wallace County Council representing the Wairaki Riding of that county:
- the member of the Wallace County Council representing the Wairio Riding of that county:
- the President of the Nightcaps District Miners' Union.

== Locomotives ==
=== NZR steam locomotives ===
Original Class and Number	Builder	Builders number	Year built	In service (Note: In service dates are from when the locomotive first ran for the Ohai Railway Board, not for the NZR.)	Withdrawn (Note: Withdrawal dates are from when the locomotive was withdrawn by the Ohai Railway Board, not for the NZR.)	Notes
C 167	Dübs & Company	801	1875	1915	1950	
F^{A} 10	Avonside Engine Company	1094	1876	1919	1940	
F^{A} 157	Yorkshire Engine Company	243	1875	29 January 1923	1927	
F^{A} 251	Dübs & Company	1366	1880	1939	1954	
W^{AB} 794	NZR Hillside Workshops	251	1927	1955	1968	Preserved, Feilding and District Steam Rail Society.
X 442	NZR Addington Workshops	97	1909	1944	1968	Preserved, Feilding and District Steam Rail Society.
X 446	NZR Addington Workshops	101	1909	1946	1959	

=== NZR diesel locomotives ===
Original Class and Number	TMS Class and Number	ORB Number	Builder	Builders number	Year built	In service	Withdrawn	Notes
D^{SA} 218	DSA 224		Drewry Car Co.	2416	1953	August 1982	July 1989	Preserved, The Plains Vintage Railway & Historical Museum.
D^{SA} 234	DSA 387		Drewry Car Co.	2432	1953	March 1981	1982	Preserved, Oamaru Steam and Rail Restoration Society.
D^{J} 1229	DJ 3303	3	Mitsubishi	1536	1967	1988	1990	Preserved, Mainline Steam Heritage Trust.
T^{R} 81	TR 309		Drewry Car Co.	2097	1938	1939	1955	Originally built for the ORB, but later sold to the NZR. Preserved, Ocean Beach Railway.

=== Industrial steam locomotives ===
Only one industrial steam loco was built and operated for the ORB.

Builder	Builders number	Name	Year built	In service	Withdrawn	Notes
Hawthorn Leslie	3663	Benoni	1927	1927	1950	Rear bogie held by the Bush Tramway Club.

=== Industrial diesel locomotives ===
All of these locos were originally built for the ORB, but were later either sold to other industrial users, or placed into preservation straight away.

ORB Number	Builder	Builders number	Year built	In service	Withdrawn	Notes
1	Drewry Car Co.	2248	1948	1948	1968	Preserved, Rimutaka Incline Railway Heritage Trust.
2	Drewry Car Co.	2585	1957	1957	1968	Preserved, Rotoura Ngongotaha Railway Trust.
1	Mitsubishi	1475	1967	1967	1990	Preserved, Ocean Beach Railway.(Classified as "Type C" by NZR)
2	Mitsubishi	1476	1967	1967	1990	Preserved, Steam Incorporated. (Classified as "Type C" by NZR)

== Preservation ==
The Ohai Railway Board was closely associated with the railway preservation movement. It donated its steam locomotives X 442 and W^{AB} 794 to the New Zealand Railway and Locomotive Society in 1968 and they are leased to the Feilding and District Steam Rail Society for restoration. W^{AB} 794 is currently in mainline operating condition and hauls heritage passenger trains in the North Island from its Feilding depot, and has been hauling Tranz Scenic's Overlander express on "Steam Engine Saturdays" and "Steam Engine Sundays". The Ohai Railway Board Heritage Trust, an organisation with no connection with the Ohai Railway Board, was set up to preserve facilities in Wairio and restore a number of steam locomotives of the P and V classes, but has been dissolved. The engines were recovered from being dumped by a river in Branxholme, formerly on the Kingston Branch town and now on the Ohai Line.

== See also ==
- Ohai Railway Board Heritage Trust
- Wairio Branch
