= Ocean Beach Railway =

Heritage railway in Dunedin, New Zealand

Coordinates: 45°54′24.73″S 170°30′35.04″E

The Ocean Beach Railway (OBR) is a heritage railway that operates in Dunedin, New Zealand. It is located between John Wilson Drive in the suburb of Saint Kilda and sports grounds near Forbury Park Raceway, and runs parallel with the city's main beach, Ocean Beach. This is near where the Ocean Beach Branch once ran, but not on the same formation.

The OBR can claim a couple of notable distinctions. The first is that it was the first organisation to preserve a steam locomotive in New Zealand with the intention of operating it. The second is that it was the first operating heritage railway in New Zealand, with the first train running in 1963.

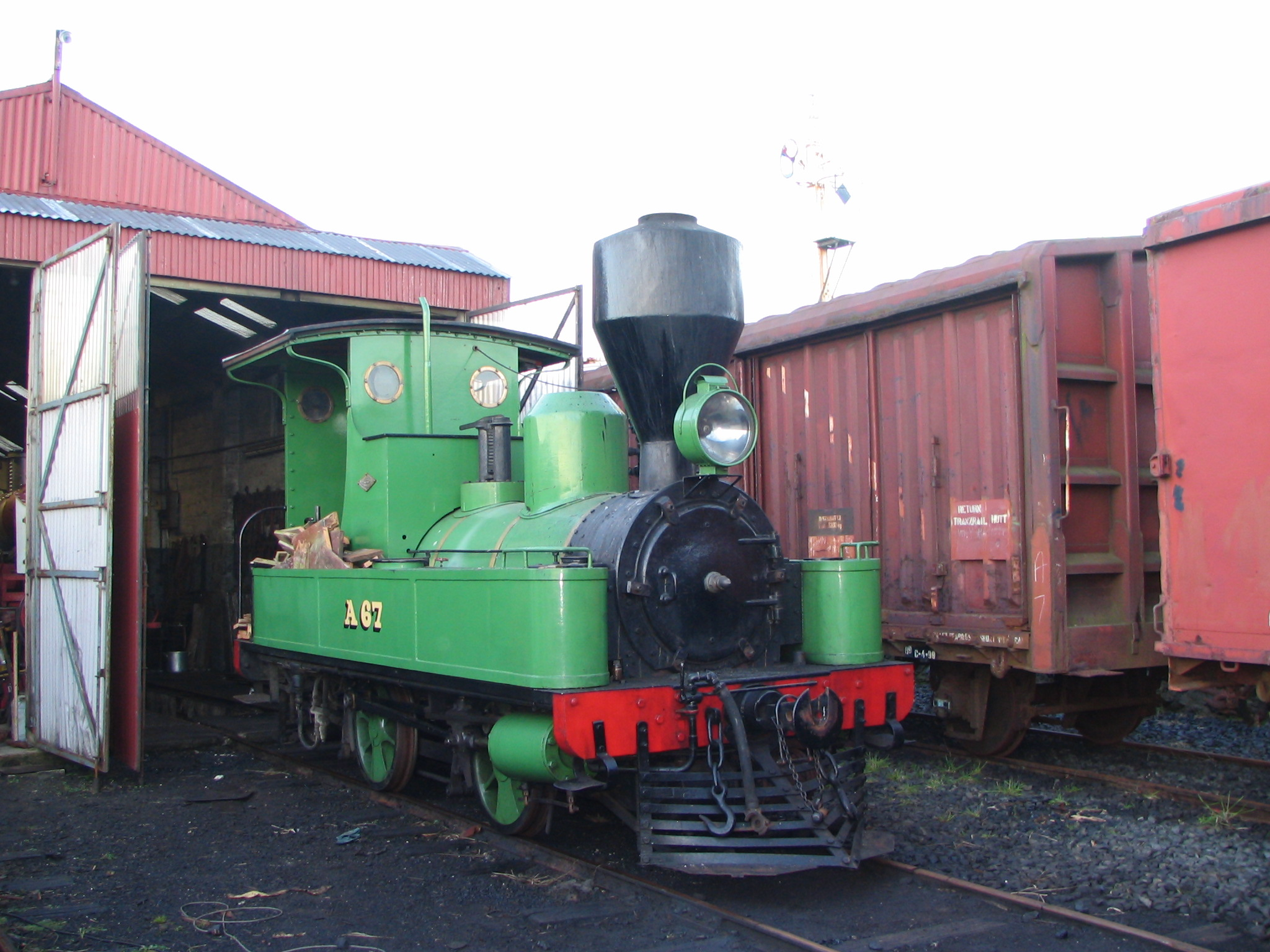
A67 at Ocean Beach Railway, 3 August 2007.

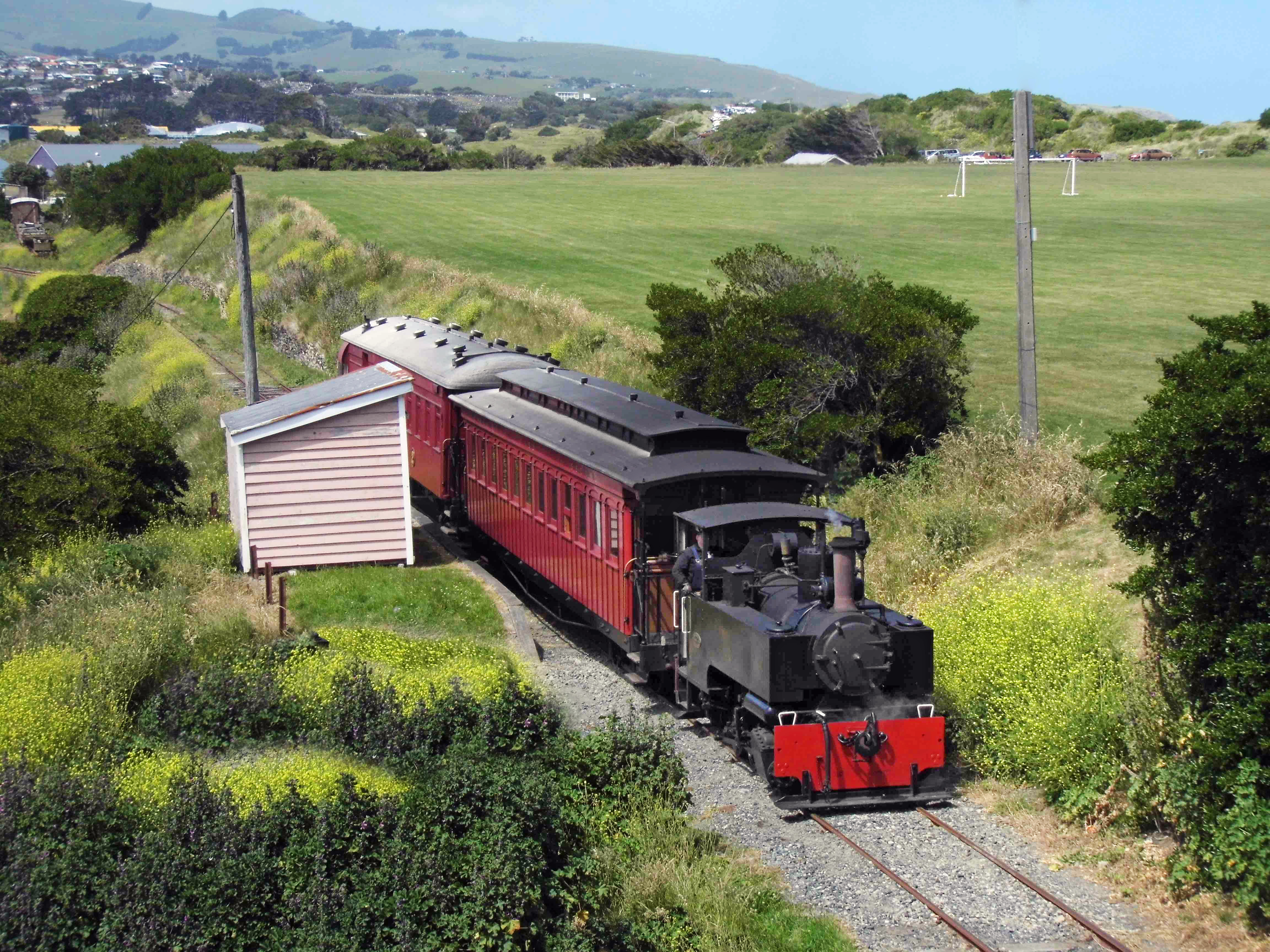
Haig class Kerr Stuart locomotive with two carriages on the Ocean Beach Railway embankment, 24 August 2020.

== History ==
In 1960, the late S. A. Rockliff and a small group of members of the New Zealand Railway and Locomotive Society Otago Branch placed a bid of $20 to purchase a small 9-ton Fowler 0-4-0T tank locomotive, Maker's N^{O} 15912 of 1921 and used by the Public Works Department as their N^{O} 540, from the Otago Harbour Board. Their bid was successful, making this locomotive the first to be preserved by a heritage railway in New Zealand. The locomotive whistle was first heard near the site of the former Ocean Beach railway station in August 1961.

Permission was granted by the Ocean Beach Domain Board to lay 60 yards (55 m) of track at Kettle Park in Saint Kilda, alongside the Otago Model Engineers' Club grounds. Surplus tram rails were obtained from the Dunedin City Council. Passenger operations began during Festival Week in 1963 with PWD 540 and a four-wheeled wagon fitted with high sides, carrying 2,700 passengers. It was decided to extend the line to the nearby locality of Saint Clair, following part of the route of the Dunedin Peninsula and Ocean Beach Railway Progress was made on this extension, approximately 200 metres (220 yd) from where the line now terminates, but this had to be removed due to dune erosion. The line currently runs from John Wilson Ocean Drive to Moana Rua Road, covering a distance of approximately 900 metres (980 yd).

During this period the OBR extended both their line and their collection with other locomotives donated by or purchased from Milburn Lime & Cement, the Otago Harbour Board, and McDonald's Lime among others. More rolling stock including examples of historic passenger carriages and goods wagons were purchased from the NZR, including the remains of two Dunedin & Port Chalmers Railway vehicles. A locomotive shed and later carriage shed were built, and protected by an 8-foot high (2.4 m), vandal-proof fence.

== List of locomotives ==
Key:	In Service	In Service, Main Line Certified	Under Overhaul/Restoration	Stored	Static Display	Scrapped

Number	TMS Number	Builder	Builder's Number	Year built	Acquired by Ocean Beach	Notes
A 66		Dübs & Company	648	1873	1973	Entered NZR service in 1875. Withdrawn in 1904 and sold to NZ Pine Company at their Colac Bay plant. In the same year, it was sold to Dunedin City Gas Works. Used until 1949 where it was placed on display in Dunedin next to E 175 "Josephine" outside the Otago Early Settlers Museum In 1973 it was then purchased by the OBR and placed into storage. Leased to Carnarvon Restaurant in 1981 until damaged by a fire in 1988. The 'A' was given a cosmetic overhaul and moved to Middlemarch for display. In 2000 it was leased to the Waimea Plains Railway and is currently being stored.
A 67		Dübs & Company	647	1873	1967	Entered NZR service in 1873. Withdrawn in 1891 and sold to Hokonui Coal Company. In 1892 it was then repurchased by the NZR. Withdrawn again in 1896 and sold to Lovells Flat Coal Company. In 1906 it was sold to Real MacKay Company at their Milton plant, then to Bruce Railway & Coal Co. in 1907 and to Milburn Lime & Cement in 1921. In 1967 it was purchased by the OBR. It was then restored to operational condition. In 1994 it was withdrawn from active service for an overhaul. It received Westinghouse brake equipment and was returned to service a year later. In September 1995 it took part in the 1995 Waipara Vintage Festival at the Weka Pass Railway. It was then taken out of service in October 1996 for another overhaul. This was completed in February 1998. In October 2006 it took part in the Dunedin Railway Station's 100th Birthday Celebrations. The "A" is currently under a 10-year overhaul, which is on pause as the organisation sources the necessary funding.
D 6		Neilson & Company	2564	1880	1965	Entered NZR service in 1880. Sold to the Taratu Coal Co., Lovells Flat in 1917 and then on-sold in 1940 to McDonald's Lime at their Oamaru plant. Used by McDonald's until 1965 when acquired by the OBR. It was stored for many years awaiting eventual restoration. In January 2022 it was transported to Bulleid Engineering in Winton, Southland, for external restoration. When completed it will form part of the Lumsden Heritage Trust's historic train.
D^{S} 203	59	Drewry	2527	1954	November 1982	Entered NZR service in May 1955. Withdrawn in November 1982 and sold to the OBR in the same month. It was then repainted black and maroon. In 2005 it was taken out of service after the arrival of DSA 549 and awaited an overhaul. This commenced on 29 March 2014. This overhaul was paused but was then restarted in mid-2023. The locomotive should return to passenger service in 2024.
D^{SA} 252	549	Hunslet	4530	1954	February 5, 2005	Entered NZR service in November 1954. Renumbered as DSA 549 in 1978. Withdrawn in September 1982. It was then purchased by PPCS (now Silver Fern Farms) for their Burnside freezing works. Placed on loan to the OBR in February 2005 and arrived on the 5th of that month under the proviso that should it be needed it must be returned. Full ownership of the locomotive was later transferred to OBR.
D^{SA} 256	592	Hunslet	4534	1954	2000	Entered NZR service in September 1955. Renumbered as DSA 592 in 1978. It was taken out of service in 1980 and repainted in the "International Orange" livery. Withdrawn in August 1986. Returned to service on 29 January 1981. It was then purchased by the Fiordland Vintage Machinery Museum in that month for a proposed railway at Te Anau. It was purchased in 1999 privately and placed into storage at the OBR. It is now under the railways' ownership.
F 111		Dübs & Company	1233	1879	1966	Entered NZR service in 1879. Withdrawn on 18 July 1934. It was then purchased by the Oamaru Harbour Board. It was then sold to the railway in March 1966. It was restored in 1975 to operating condition. It was then withdrawn for a 10-year overhaul in 1985. During that year when the overhaul commenced its boiler was condemned. In 2007 the overhaul re-commenced. It has been named "Rob Roy" in preservation.
F 150		Dübs & Company	1371	1880	1974	Entered NZR service in October 1882. Withdrawn in January 1958. Stored until 1961 when it was moved and put on display at a park in Invercargill until 1974. It was donated to the Ocean Beach Railway later that year and it was kept in storage. In 1986 the OBR leased F 150 to the Ashburton Railway & Preservation Society for eventual restoration at The Plains Vintage Railway & Historical Museum. Restoration commenced sometime after arrival. Restoration was put aside for the restorations of their A 64, K 88 and Price 119. In 2019, the lease of F150 was taken over by the Southern Steam Trust and moved to Invercargill. In 2021 the trust gathered $300,000 of funding and the restoration began. It is estimated that the project will take 3 years, finishing sometime in 2024 and a total of $700,000 worth of funding will be required. The trust aims to restore F 150 to a mainline standard. When it is complete, the trust aims to run F 150 on the KiwiRail network around Invercargill as well as in private heritage railways around the lower South Island.
Kerr Stuart 4185		Kerr Stuart	4185	1929	1960	Built in 1929 for Kempthorne Prosser. It was purchased by the club and restored to operational condition. In 1994 it was withdrawn from service for an overhaul. It received Westinghouse brake equipment and was returned to service on 13 May 1995. In September later that year, it took part in the 1995 Waipara Vintage Festival at the Weka Pass Railway. In the 2000s it was withdrawn for an overhaul. This was completed in 2007. On 21 April 2014, it was taken out of service for some tube replacement, which was completed and the locomotive returned to service. Upon the expiry of the boiler ticket in 2021, it was found that the poorly installed tubes from 2014 were severely corroded and thin. This locomotive is now in storage but has made brief appearances on static display trains.
Price 185		A & G Price	185	1958	December 1993	Built for Alliance Meats for their Lorneville freezing works. Purchased by the railway in December 1993 and arrived in the same month. It currently awaits restoration although in an operational condition.
PWD 540		John Fowler & Company	15912	1921	1960	Built in 1921 for the Public Works Department. It was then sold to the Otago Harbour Board in 1951. It was then purchased by the railway in 1960 and it was restored to operating condition. In 1963 the 'PWD' was recommissioned. The locomotive is missing wheels, axles, valve motion and bodywork, and also requires major boiler repairs. As such, it is not a high priority for restoration, however, it is hoped it will one day return to service. It is notable for being the first preserved locomotive in New Zealand.
T^{R} 81	309	Drewry	2097	1939	1988	Built in 1939 for the Ohai Railway Board. In November 1955 it was sold to the NZR and reclassified as T^{R} 81. Re-engined in February 1969. Renumbered as TR 309 in 1978. Sold to the railway, and later restored to Ohai Railway Board appearance. In service.
Traills Tractor		A&T Burt.	126	1926	1997	Built for Milburn Cement. Displayed at a Kindergarten until 1997, to Ocean Beach Railway. Stored.
T^{R} 157	603	A & G Price		1958	2021	Built in 1958 for the New Zealand Railways ( NZR ), it was intended for use around Maungaturoto, Te Awamutu, Kinleith, Auckland and Frankton. T^{R} 157 eventually found its way down to Dunedin where it was employed by KiwiRail on light shunting duties around the Dunedin depot. It was recently purchased by members of the Ocean Beach Railway and is used for light shunting duties around the yard. This locomotive was the very first of the very last batch of T^{R} locomotives built for the NZR. In service.
N^{O}. 1		Mitsubishi Heavy Industries	1475	1967	2019	Built in 1967 for the Ohai Railway Board (ORB), where it performed main line duties on the Ohai branch line around Wairio. It is Number 1 of 2 built for the ORB, which was part of a batch of 5, the other three going to the NZR to become members of the D^{SB} Class. N^{O}. 2 survives in restored condition at Steam Incorporated. N^{O}. 1 is not complete, but all of the remaining parts are in the Ocean Beach Railway inventory. Parts of note are the main reservoir air tanks and the CAT D-343TA diesel engine, which runs but is not installed in the locomotive.

== Rolling stock ==
The OBR possesses numerous historic passenger carriages, freight wagons, and a hand crane. The collection includes the following vehicles:

Key:	In Service	In Service, Main Line Certified	Under Overhaul/Restoration	Stored	Static Display	Scrapped

Number	TMS Number	Other Number	Builder	Type	Year built	Acquired by Ocean Beach	Notes
R 23			NZR	Open air carriage	1910	1967	Built in 1910 as a bogie version of the L-class wooden highside wagon. Acquired by OBR sometime in the mid 1960s and used as a passenger carriage with a cover before being converted to an open-top passenger carriage in the late 1960s. The body was scrapped in 2019 and the bogies were overhauled and sent to Lumsden to be used under the body of carriage A 199.
Z 34		Ea 1220	NZR	Postal/Luggage Car	25 June 1904	1975	Built in 1934 as a postal/luggage car. As a Z-9 variant of the Z wagon class, Z 34 is unique among Z wagons in that it has doors at either end for access from carriages, internal lighting and windows on each of the 3 sliding doors on each side. In 1938 it was used on the Dunedin Breakdown Train for the Ways & Works Branch of the NZR as Ea 1220. It was written off in 1975 and sent to OBR. It was given a light repaint and remains in storage to this day. It is thought to be the last Z wagon of its kind remaining in New Zealand.
D 139		E 897	Hyslops Dunedin	Crew Hut	1877	1984	Built in 1879 by the Hyslops company of Dunedin as a D-class four-wheeled passenger carriage. In 1885 it was rebuilt at Hillside Workshops in Christchurch, where it received a new body. It was written off in Invercargill in 1898, and in 1902 was reclassified to K 444. In 1937 it was converted to crew hut carriage E 897, in which it retained one end platform and had the other turned into an extension of the body. It was written off in Dunedin on 04/11/1961. It remains in this configuration to this day and is currently in storage.
A 193		Ea 1541	Addington Workshops	Composite Clerestory Carriage	1886	1967	Built in 1886 as a 1st and 2nd Class composite carriage with a clerestory roof. in 1941 it was converted to a sleeping van and ran as Ea 1541. Stored from 1961 to 1967. In 1967 it was acquired by OBR, and a 10-year restoration process began in 1976, and it entered service for OBR in 1986 - 100 years after it was built. It remains in service to this day.
A 210		A 286, Ea 1536	Addington Workshops	Turntable Repair Gang Carriage	1883	1966	Initially numbered A 286, this carriage was built in 1883 as a 1st and 2nd Class composite carriage with a clerestory roof, just like A 193. in 1941 it was renumbered to A 210, and then soon converted to a carriage for the Dunedin based Turntable Repair Gang, running as Ea 1536. In 1966 it was acquired by OBR and placed into storage. A restoration was started in the mid 2000s but was never completed. This carriage is still in storage.
Ra 497			NZR	Custom Built Carriage	1920	1964	Similar to the R wagon, it was built in 1920 as a bogie version of the four-wheeled La class highside wagon. It was acquired by OBR in 1964 and converted to a clerestory carriage. This carriage held a couple different forms, most notably the removal of the clerestory section in the roof, but was ultimately scrapped in 2019 due to poor condition of the body and underframe.
A 529		Ea 1564	Addington Workshops	41' (12 m) Fitters & Plumbers Carriage (Ex Ministerial)	1897	1975	Built in 1897 at Christchurch's Addington Workshops as a birdcage carriage (commonly referred to as a half-birdcage). In 1904 it was converted to a 1st class Ministerial carriage, which involved replacing the mesh wall of the birdcage section with a solid wall. In 1929 it was converted to Ea 1564, a Fitters & Plumbers carriage on the Ways & Works Branch Dunedin Breakdown Train. The body was acquired by OBR in 1975 - the underframe went to the Pleasant Point Railway in Oamaru for A 421. The carriage body is in storage and rests on the underframe of A 1548.
K 543		E 1165	Midland Car Company	Crew Hut	1900	1989	Built in 1900 by the Midland Car Company as a K-class box wagon, No. 543. In 1938 it was converted to a crew hut for the Ways & Works branch as E 1165. It was placed into storage at Hillside Workshops in 1971, and acquired by OBR in 1989. It was placed into storage for a few years until it was restored as a crew hut and numbered K 543.
A 620			American Car & Foundry Co.	47'8" (14.53 m) Centre Entry Turtleback Carriage	1901	1960s	Built by the American Car & Foundry Co in 1901. Left NZR service in 1933, where it was sold to a private owner. Only one of the two carriage body halves remained and the location of the underframe was unknown when it was acquired by OBR in the 1960s. This carriage was never moved to the OBR site and is currently presumed scrapped.
Af 874		A 874	Hillside Workshops		1905	1977	Built in 1905 as narrow-windowed 47 ft 6 in (14.48 m) carriage A 874. In 1948 it was converted to a carvan (combination carriage + guards van) at Addington Workshops in Christchurch. In 1968 it was purchased by the Taieri Model Railway Club, and was placed at the end of the Outram Branch railway line to be used as their clubrooms. In 1977 it was donated to OBR, and, using parts from the underframe and bogies of Af 872, was restored to passenger service. It is still in service today.
A 1002	EA860	Ea 3559	Addington Workshops	Underframe Only	1907	1978	Built in 1907 as a 47 ft 6 in (14.48 m) turtleback carriage. Used in Ways & Works service from 1964 to 1978, paired with steam crane No. 257. After being acquired by OBR in 1978, the entire body was cut up and burned in the firebox of the Kerr Stuart due to rot. This carriage currently exists as the underframe only.
A 1254	A50547	XPC479	Addington Workshops	2nd Class Scarrett Carriage	1913	1969, 2017	In NZR service from 1913 to 1969. Sold to the OBR in 1969, where it was overhauled and used for several years. Leased to the Otago Excursion Train Trust (OETT) and returned in 2017. This carriage is currently under restoration and is expected to debut in 2024.
A 1548			Addington Workshops	Underframe only	1924	Unknown	Built at Addington Workshops in 1924, as a 47'6" carriage. The body of A 529 currently rests on top of this carriage.
F 641	F2530		Addington Workshops	30' (9.1 m) Steel Guards Van	1941	2023	Built in 1941 as one of many 30 ft (9.1 m) Steel Guards Vans for New Zealand's South Island. Was written off due to flat spots on the wheels and sold to a private owner in Waitati, without bogies or brake rigging. Was donated to OBR in 2021 and ownership was formally acquired in 2023. It still sits at Waitati but is planned to be moved soon - OBR has a pair of bogies and all of the necessary parts required to restore this guards van to operation.

Ocean Beach is well renowned for its active restoration of freight rolling stock, some examples of which are very rare and have earned the railway numerous restoration awards. The railway also owns 5-long-ton (5.1 t) Ransome & Rapier hand crane 287 of 1874, and restoration work on the crane earned the OBR a Rolling Stock Award from the Federation of Rail Organisations NZ. The Ocean Beach Railway is one of very few railways in New Zealand which can produce an accurate late 19th century period train.

The OBR also owns the underframes of two ex-Dunedin & Port Chalmers Railway Company vehicles, each built in 1872. These are the oldest rail vehicles in the OBR collection. It is likely they are goods wagons although carriage historian John Agnew believes that they may be from passenger carriages.

== Operation ==
The Ocean Beach Railway has traditionally operated a summer schedule with services every Sunday. In 2006, the OBR commenced operating a reduced winter schedule, featuring services on the last Sunday of every month. Trains are operated by a diesel locomotive. Currently, T^{R} 81 is used to pull trains, with A67 and Kerr Stuart 4185 out of service for their 10-year boiler examination. D^{S} 203 is currently out of service but will take over running passenger trains once the cosmetic overhaul is completed. T^{R} 81 will be relegated to shunting duties, as well as a backup or an assisting locomotive should it be required. D^{SA} 252 will also return to service once the (now paused) cosmetic overhaul has been completed and the new engine cooling system is reinstalled.
