= Ohai Railway Board Heritage Trust =

Railway preservation society in New Zealand

Coordinates: 45.9995°S 168.0306°E

The Ohai Railway Board Heritage Trust is a defunct railway preservation society that was formed to preserve Southland's rail history. The trust was formerly based at Wairio on the Wairio Branch in the former Ohai Railway Board workshops, and owned a number of locomotives and items of rolling stock, including the remains of two P class 2-8-0 tender locomotives.

== Trust lapses ==
In 2006, the ORBHT's lease on the former ORB workshops and yard at Wairio was allowed to lapse after the trust decided not to pursue the idea of running heritage services from Bluff to Ohai. The trust's locomotives and rolling stock remained on the site most of the trust's stock remained at Wairio with the exception of diesel shunting locomotive D^{S} 201 and the remains of steam locomotive P 60, which had moved to Dunedin and Lumsden respectively.

== Banned ==
In December 2011, members of the ORBHT were banned from entering the Wairio yard and workshop buildings after being served a trespass notice by KiwiRail. The notice was served on the grounds that the trust's members had not sought permission from KiwiRail to access the site; one of the trust members responded by saying the trust had become concerned with the neglected state of the site and the potential fire risk, and had stepped in to clean the site up.

== Locomotives and Rolling Stock ==
In 2002, the ORBHT purchased two diesel shunting locomotives, D^{S} 201 from Alliance Meats at Lorneville and the former Ohai Railway Board Mitsubishi shunter N^{O} 1 which was then stored at Wairio. In 2003 they also recovered the chassis of P 60 and the engine unit of P 133 on 4 April 2003. In 2014 P 133 was unknownly purchased and was transported to Mosgiel. It will be later transported to Middlemarch for static display for funding so it can be restored to working condition. Also in 2014 D^{S} 201 was purchased by a private owner and transported to Dunedin. The 'D^{S}' is in operational order but requires a repaint. The chassis of P 60 was purchased by the Lumsden Heritage Trust along with three wagons.

In 2016 several pieces of rolling stock were leased to other South Island heritage groups by Southland District Council. (The tables below have not been updated to reflect these leases.)

=== Other Rolling Stock ===
| Key: | In service, Mainline Certified | In service | Static display | Under overhaul/restoration | Stored | Scrapped |

| Type | Number | Builder | Year built | Arrived at Wairio | Notes |
|---|---|---|---|---|---|
| Carriage | A 294 | NZR Petone Workshops | 1892 | 14 February 2003 | Named Nightcaps. Entered service for the New Zealand Railways Department in 1892. Withdrawn in 1952 and purchased by the Ohai Railway Board. It was later leased to the Oamaru Steam and Rail Restoration Society in 1990. It was stored in Oamaru until being transferred back to Wairio on 14 February 2003. Carriage A294 will be leased to the Waimea Plains Railway Trust to be restored to operational status. |
| Carriage | A 525 | NZR Addington Workshops | 1896 | 2003 | Named Ohai. Entered service for the New Zealand Railways Department in 1896. Withdrawn and sold to the Ohai Railway Board on 16 August 1952. It was later leased to the Oamaru Steam and Rail Restoration Society in 1990. It was stored in Oamaru until being transferred back to Wairio on 14 February 2003. Carriage A525 will be leased to Lumsden Heritage Trust to be situated as part of their static railway display of heritage rail assets at the Lumsden Heritage Precinct. |
| Van | F 11 | n/a | 1886 | 9 August 2002 | Named Morley. Entered service for the New Zealand Railways Department in 1886. Withdrawn in 1937 and converted to Way & Works ballast plough van E 932. Purchased by the Ohai Railway Board in 1941, later leased to the Oamaru Steam and Rail Restoration Society in 1994. It was stored in Oamaru until being transferred back to Wairio on 9 August 2002. The guards and plough van, which has a high heritage value, will be leased to the National Railway Museum in Christchurch. |
| Wagon | ER 295 | NZR Otahuhu Workshops | 1954 | 2000 | Formerly J^{C} 5307 (1954 - 1978), E 4189 (1978) and E 5326 (1978 - 1981). Withdrawn on 17 August 1974. Owned by the Rail Heritage Trust of New Zealand and leased to the ORBHT. |
| Wagon | Unidentified L | n/a | n/a | n/a | Formerly owned by the Ohai Railway Board. |
| Wagon | LA 2962 | NZR Otahuhu Workshops | 1931 | n/a | Pre-TMS: L^{A} 17119. Withdrawn in Invercargill in August 1978. Formerly owned by the Ohai Railway Board. |
| Wagon | LA 16320 | NZR Otahuhu Workshops | 1931 | n/a | Pre-TMS: L^{A} 17134. Withdrawn on 10 October 1966 after traffic damage. Formerly owned by the Ohai Railway Board. |
| Wagon | L^{B} 2631 | NZR Addington Workshops | 22 May 1976 | n/a | Owned by the Rail Heritage Trust of New Zealand and leased to the ORBHT. |
| Wagon | LPF 388 | n/a | 1995 | 2000 | Pre-TMS: the number is unidentified. Owned by the Rail Heritage Trust of New Zealand and leased to the ORBHT. Used for transportation of fertiliser. |
| Wagon | LPS 351 | n/a | 1989 | n/a | Pre-TMS: the number is unidentified. Former LPA wagon converted for scrap haulage, Owned by the Rail Heritage Trust of New Zealand. Formerly leased to the ORBHT, now on static display at Lumsden railway station. |
| Wagon | WOA 620 | NZR Otahuhu Workshops | 1939 | n/a | Formerly L^{A} 19320. |
| Wagon | X^{A} 2583 | n/a | n/a | n/a | Rebuilt in 1950 at the Otahuhu Workshop] after an accident. Donated to the ORBHT by PPCS. Frame and body only. |
| Wagon | X^{A} 2587 | n/a | n/a | n/a | Rebuilt in 1950 at the Otahuhu Workshops after an accident. It was then donated to the ORBHT by PPCS. |

== See also ==
- Ohai Railway Board
- Wairio Branch
