= Lumsden Heritage Trust =

Heritage group in New Zealand

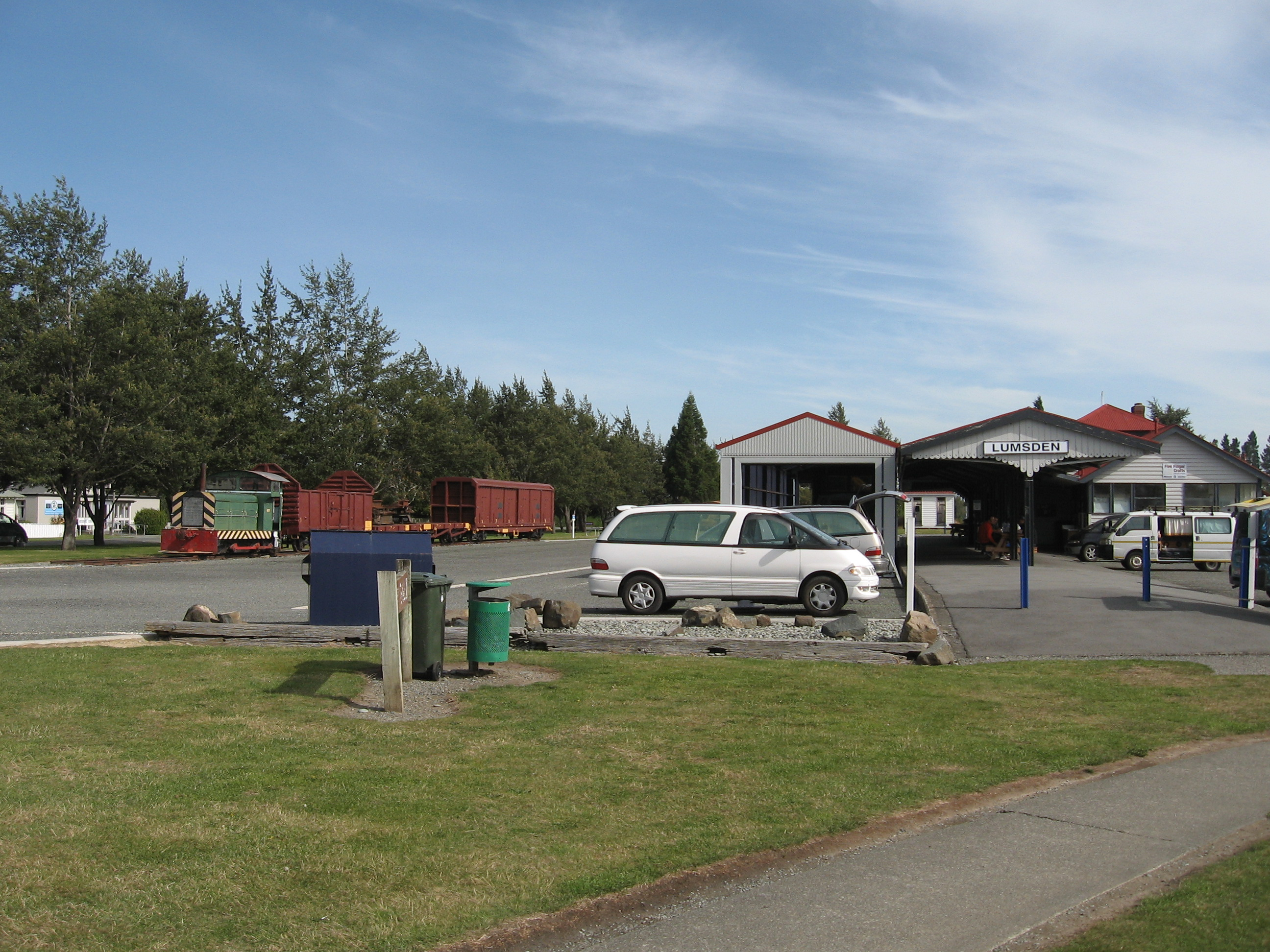
Lumsden Railway Precinct and Station

The Lumsden Heritage Trust was formed in November 2013 to preserve the past, promote the future and provide an attraction for visitors. The trust has two ex-AFFCO locomotives that were formerly preserved by the Goldfields Railway, the chassis of P 60, ex-New Zealand Railways (NZR) wagons that were formerly preserved by the Ohai Railway Board Heritage Trust, a railway station including a crane next to it and a jail from the Lumsden camping grounds.

The trust planned to recover two V class steam locomotives from the Mararoa Junction Locomotive Dump in the Ōreti River These two locomotives were unearthed in 2018. On 29 January 2020, V 127 was recovered and put on display, but it proved impracticable to remove V 126. After further consideration a new attempt to remove V 126 was made on 27 February 2020, and this proved successful. The following day the locomotive was also put on display.

The trust plans to relocate the original wooden Anglican All Saints Church to re-purpose it as a regional war memorial museum and to host some of the events being planned to commemorate World War I.

== Locomotives and rolling stock ==
=== NZR steam locomotives ===
Key:	In service	In service, Mainline Certified	Under overhaul/restoration/repair	Stored	Static display	Scrapped

Original class and number	Builder	Builders number	Year built	Arrived	Notes
D 6	Neilson and Co.	2564	1880	April 16, 2025	Entered NZR service in May 1881. Sold to the Taratu Coal Co. in 1917, then to McDonald's Oamaru Lime Ltd. in 1940. In 1965 it went into preservation at the Ocean Beach Railway. It was gifted to the Lumsden Heritage Trust in 2022 and restored by Bulleid Engineering in Winton before being put on display on 16 April 2025.
V 126	Nasmyth, Wilson and Co.	261	1885	February 28, 2020	Entered NZR service on 10 November 1885. Dumped in the Ōreti River near Mararoa Junction for riverbank protection on 28 October 1928. Recovered and put on display on 28 February 2020.
V 127	Nasmyth, Wilson and Co.	255	1885	January 29, 2020	Entered NZR service on 3 February 1886. Dumped in the Ōreti River near Mararoa Junction for riverbank protection on 28 October 1928. Recovered and put on display on 29 January 2020.

=== Industrial diesel locomotives ===
Key:	In service	In service, Mainline Certified	Under overhaul/restoration/repair	Stored	Static display	Scrapped

Builder	Builders number	Year built	Arrived	Notes
Drewry Car Co.	2246	1948	October 18, 2014	Built for AFFCO for their Horotiu plant in 1948. Used until 1991 when it was placed into storage. In 1995 it was sold to the Goldfields Railway and was restored to operational condition. In 2014 it was purchased by the trust after they became surplus to Goldfields requirements. It arrived in Lumsden on 18 October 2014.
Drewry Car Co.	2247	1948	October 18, 2014	Built for AFFCO for their Southdown plant in 1948. Used until 1991 when it was placed into storage. In 1993 it was sold to a private owner and leased to the Goldfields Railway where it was restored to operational condition. In 2014 it was purchased by the trust after they became surplus to Goldfields requirements. It arrived in Lumsden on 18 October 2014.

=== Wagons ===
Key:	In service	In service, Mainline Certified	Under overhaul/restoration/repair	Stored	Static display	Scrapped

Pre-TMS Class and Number	TMS Class and Number	Type	Builder	Year built	Arrived	Notes
	LPS 351	Highside	N/A	1989	2014	Used for transportation of scrap metal. Formerly preserved by the Ohai Railway Board Heritage Trust, owned by the Rail Heritage Trust of New Zealand.
U^{B} 1140	UB 2981	Flat Deck	NZR Otahuhu Workshops	1945	2014	Entered NZR in 1940. Renumbered as UB 2981 in 1978. Withdrawn on 11 August 1984. Formerly preserved by the Ohai Railway Board Heritage Trust, owned by the Rail Heritage Trust of New Zealand.
Z^{P} 1111	ZP 5588 15069	Box	NZR Otahuhu Workshops	1968	2014	Entered NZR on 9 November 1968. Renumbered as ZP 5588 in 1978. It was then renumbered again as ZP 15069. Formerly preserved by the Ohai Railway Board Heritage Trust, owned by the Rail Heritage Trust of New Zealand.
