= David Proudfoot (engineer) =

Engineering contractor, company director

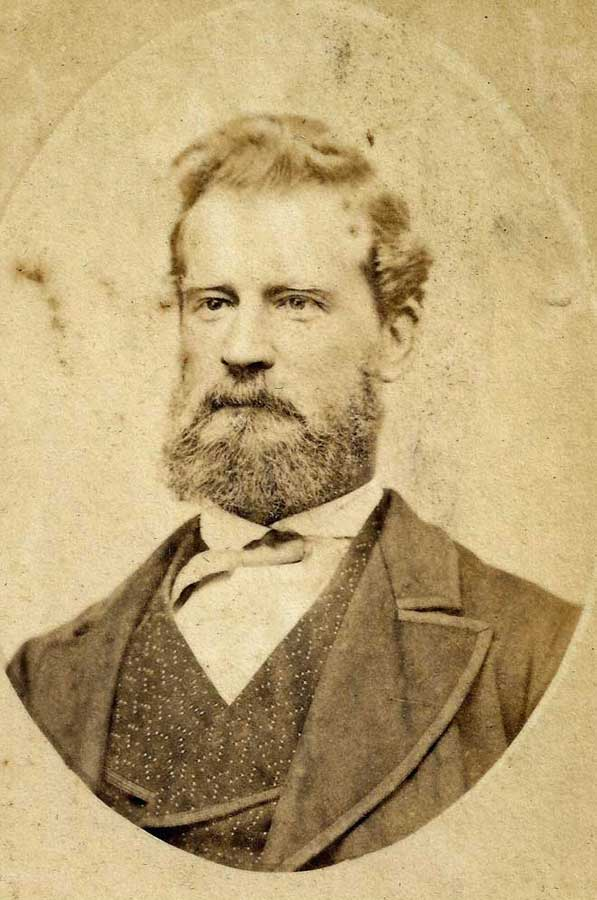
David Proudfoot about 1883

David Proudfoot (1838 – 20 March 1891) was a New Zealand engineering contractor and company director in Dunedin. He was born in Musselburgh, or Gilmerton, Midlothian, Scotland, in about 1838 or 1841.

He was a Dunedin landowner and contractor and was one of the promoters of the Dunedin Peninsula and Ocean Beach Railway. He owned the horse-drawn trams serving the suburbs of Dunedin and had a "virtual monopoly", until he sold them to the Dunedin City and Suburban Tramway Co. in 1883 for £55,000. He was the brother-in-law of newspaper proprietor Sir George Fenwick, owing to Fenwick's marriage to Proudfoot's sister Jane.

In 1883, he left Dunedin and died in Sydney on 20 March 1891, while undergoing surgery. Reports of his age at death varied between 49 and 61. A cousin said he was 50. His Waverley Cemetery burial record and an inscription on his coffin said he was 49.
