= NZR DS class =

NZR D^{S} class
Type and origin
- Power type: Diesel-Mechanical/Hydraulic
- Builder: Vulcan Foundry and Drewry Car Co
- Build date: 1955
Specifications
- Configuration
  - AAR: 0-6-0
- Gauge: 1,067 mm (3 ft 6 in)
Performance figures
- Maximum speed: 40 km/h (25 mph)
Career
- Operators: NZGR, New Zealand Railways Corporation
- Number in class: 16
- Numbers: Road numbers: 200 - 215
- First run: August 1949
- Disposition: Withdrawn 1978 - 1984, seven preserved.

The NZR DS class locomotive (Note: Following the introduction of TMS in 1979, the class classification was capitalised, whereas previously the second letter was a smaller capital letter, that is D^{S}) is a type of 16 diesel shunting locomotives built by the Vulcan Foundry and supplied by the Drewry Car Co from 1949–1955, for New Zealand Railways (NZR).

== Introduction ==
In the late 1940s, NZR was looking for a more powerful type of diesel shunting locomotive to work in the Wellington railway yards. They had trialled a number of T^{R} class shunting locomotives, none at the time were suitable with the most powerful being the five T^{R} class 0-4-0DM shunting locomotives which produced 153 horsepower. These locomotives were too small for the large Wellington yards, where a more powerful locomotive would be needed. Two more were built for the private Whakatane Board Mills Ltd Matahina Tramway in the Bay of Plenty. Both of these locomtovies are preserved.

In 1948, the Tasmanian Government Railways took delivery of four Drewry 0-6-0DM shunting locomotives based on the Class 04 shunting locomotives being built for British Railways. These locomotives, Tasmanian Government Railways V class, were powered by a Gardner 8L3 diesel engine producing 204 hp, and weighed 25.6 tonnes. These locomotives were of a standard Drewry design but built by English Electric at their Vulcan Works. A similar diesel locomotive had been built for the Ohai Railway Board in Southland, makers N^{O} 2248/D68 of 1947.

== Operation ==
The first batch of four Drewry 0-6-0DM D^{S} class locomotives arrived in Wellington in 1949 for evaluation. They were allocated the numbers D^{S} 205 - 208, with D^{S} 205 and D^{S} 206 entering service in August of that year, while D^{S} 207 and D^{S} 208 entered service in September 1949. All four locomotives were put to work in the Wellington railway yards immediately after entering into service.

Despite some teething troubles, the initial four locomotives were sufficiently capable of performing the work required. The Railways Department was pleased with the results, and in 1953 ordered seven more locomotives, of Drewry type A-1. At 26½ tons, the new arrivals were slightly heavier than the original four units, which weighed 25.5 tons. The locomotives were fitted with Westinghouse air-brakes, which were more powerful than the original locomotive brakes.

The new locomotives were given numbers D^{S} 209 - 215 and were purchased for work in the South Island. However, two stayed in the North Island temporarily, while the other five were sent to Lyttelton. Here, the new D^{S} class diesel locomotives replaced the F class 0-6-0ST steam tank locomotives used to shunt the wharves (although the F class did, in fact, remain on hand to shunt the Boat Train onto the Ferry Wharf at Lyttelton for some years after that).

In 1954, NZR purchased another five A-1 type locomotives, numbers D^{S} 200 - 204, for wharf shunting in the South Island. These locomotives were the last of the D^{S} class to enter service in 1955, with the last being D^{S} 204 in June 1955. The next class of shunting locomotives was classed D^{SA} based on the Drewery "A-2" type. Another three similar locomotives were built for industrial users to a similar pattern.

All of the D^{S} class locomotives and variants were powered by a Gardner 8L3 diesel engine producing 204 hp at 1200 rpm, coupled to a Wilson five-speed epicyclic gearbox with fluid transmission in turn connected to a final reduction and reverse unit. Power was transmitted to the wheels via a jackshaft, to which the wheels were connected by coupling rods. This jackshaft was located under the cab.

The locomotives had a tractive effort of 14,300 lb in low gear, which enabled it to move loads of up to 1000 tons in low gear at walking speed. In a higher gear, the locomotives could haul a lighter load at speeds of up to 30 mph, a respectable figure for a locomotive that had relatively small (39¾") driving wheels.

== Withdrawal and preservation ==
The withdrawal of the class began in the early 1980s. Several entered into industrial service, while three - D^{S} 202, D^{S} 203, and D^{S} 207 were purchased for preservation by Steam Incorporated, Ocean Beach Railway, and the Glenbrook Vintage Railway. Since then, another four have entered preservation since, D^{S} 213 (TMS DS134) and D^{S} 215 (DS157), with the Midland Rail Heritage Trust, D^{S} 201 (TMS DS36) at the Ohai Railway Board Heritage Trust's site in Wairio, while D^{S} 214 (TMS DS140) has now been turned into a display at Steampunk HQ, Oamaru.

- D^{S} 201 (TMS DS36) was sold to the Alliance Company to work at their Lorneville freezing works in 1982. The locomotive was latterly a backup for DS 140 after its Gardner 8L3 diesel engine was damaged by frost ingress. Purchased by the Ohai Railway Board Heritage Trust in 2002 for restoration at their workshop in Wairio. Although operational the ORBHT later became inactive before the locomotive could be repainted from its Alliance yellow livery into NZR 'Midland Red'. In 2014 it was sold to a private owner in Dunedin and was transported to Dunedin. It is still under private ownership and currently sits at the yard in Middlemarch.
- D^{S} 202 (TMS DS42) was purchased in 1985 by Steam Incorporated of Paekakariki. It is one of three diesel shunting locomotives owned by the group and is used regularly around the site. It is painted in the original NZR "Midland Red" livery and is currently operable.
- D^{S} 203 (TMS DS59) is owned by the Ocean Beach Railway of Dunedin. Purchased from the New Zealand Railways Corporation in 1982, it was one of two operable diesel locomotives at the time of its arrival at the railway. Now supplemented by D^{SA} 252 from the PPCS Burnside freezing works, which is now also at the Ocean Beach Railway. The locomotive was taken out of service for an overhaul in 2014. It is currently operational and is most of the way through a cosmetic restoration. D^{S} 203 should be completed and in service by late 2024.
- D^{S} 207 (TMS DS94) was sold to the Railway Enthusiasts Society to work on their Glenbrook Vintage Railway in 1984. It was painted in GVR yellow, although it retained its TMS number of DS 94. In 2008 it was taken out of service to be overhauled, and its duties have been taken up by Bagnall D^{SA} 243.
- D^{S} 213 (TMS DS134) was purchased in 1982 by PPCS to work at the Islington freezing works. It was donated to the Midland Railway Heritage Trust in 2005, and towed to the group's base at Springfield by a special shunting movement. It is painted in the PPCS livery of red and white and has been fitted with a strobe light on top of the cab roof.
- D^{S} 214 (TMS DS140) was purchased by the Alliance Company in 1982 to work at their Lorneville freezing works, where it worked with D^{S} 201 until that engine was relegated to backup following frost damage. In 2004, it was rendered surplus to requirements after being supplemented by a former Tranz Rail DSC2421 in 2002. The locomotive was then purchased by Harry Andrews of the Oamaru Steam & Rail Society.
  Harry Andrews purchased the locomotive as a source of parts to restore mechanically similar Drewry D^{SA} 234 (TMS DSA 387) which had worked for Alliance at their Pukeuri works in Otago. The locomotive was stripped of any similar parts to restore the D^{SA}, and was later painted black before being placed on display at the Carriages Cafe in Glenavy. The D^{S} replaced a four-wheeled Drewry, works 2153, now owned by the Canterbury Steam Preservation Society.
  In 2009 the cafe closed, and the D^{S} moved to Brian de Geest's yard in Oamaru. It was then turned into a steampunk sculpture and placed on display in Oamaru's main street in October 2010 during the annual Steampunk Festival. The locomotive is still painted in Glenavy black.
- D^{S} 215 (TMS DS157) was purchased by PPCS in 1982 to become a spare parts source for DS134. It was donated to the Midland Rail Heritage Trust in 2005 and towed out to Springfield with DS134. The locomotive is heavily stripped and is missing most of the long hood, as well as various mechanical parts and its Gardner 8L3 diesel engine. It is painted in the former NZR "International Orange" livery with the 1980s logo and white TMS number on the cab side. Its future is unknown as it may continue as a parts source for DS134 or be restored as a locomotive in its own right.
