= Steam Incorporated =

Railway preservation group in New Zealand

Coordinates: 40°59′10.34″S 174°57′25.7″E

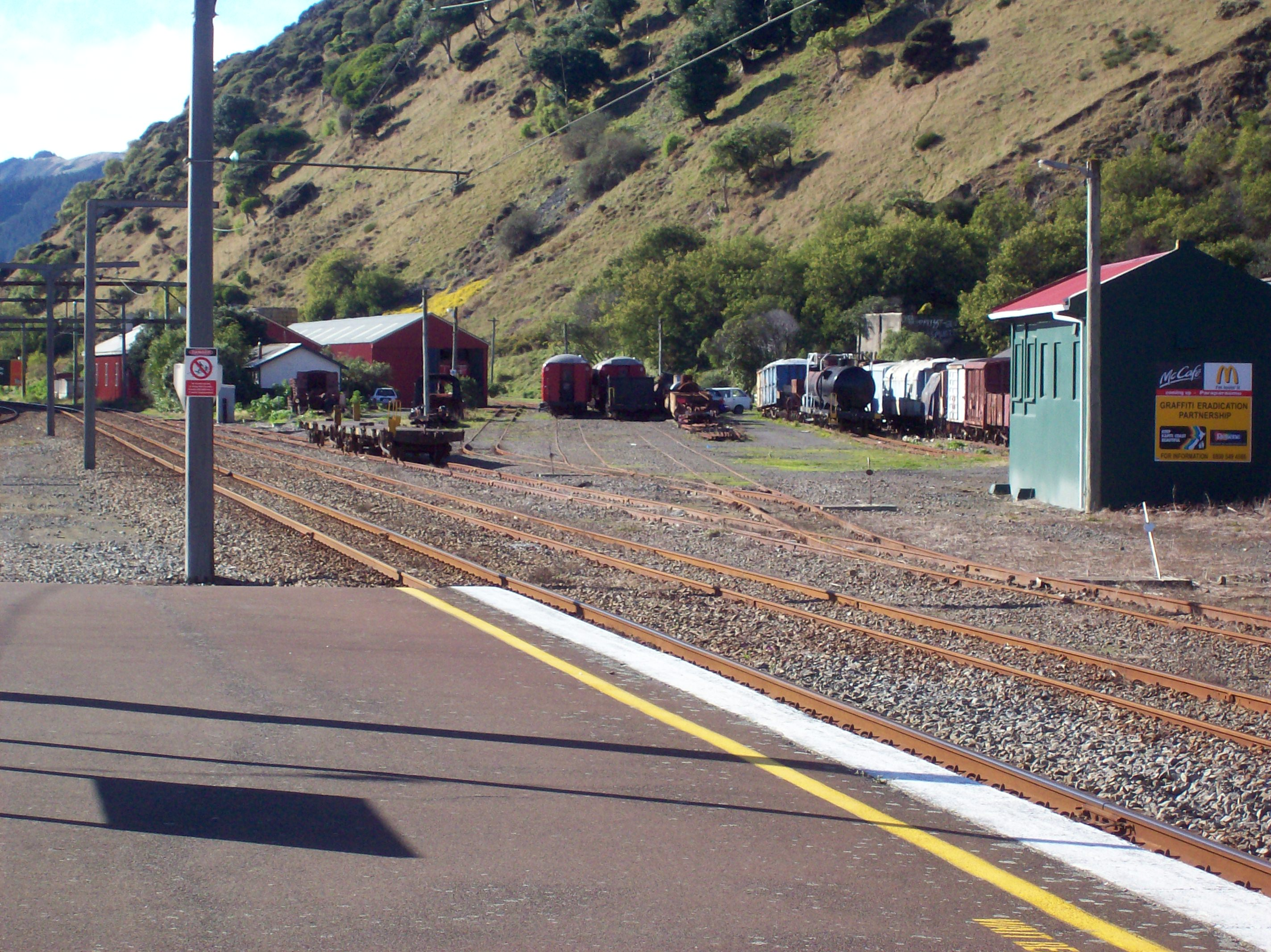
Steam Incorporated's yard as seen from Paekākāriki station on 7 July 2007.

Steam Incorporated, often abbreviated to Steam Inc., is a railway heritage and preservation society based at the Paekākāriki railway station, Paekākāriki at the southern end of the Kāpiti Coast, approximately 50 minutes north of Wellington on the west coast of New Zealand's North Island. Unlike some societies who operate on preserved sections of closed branch lines, Steam Incorporated owns a depot ("The Engine Shed") beside one of the country's most important railway lines, the North Island Main Trunk railway, and restores heritage locomotives and rolling stock for use on excursions on the regular national rail network.

== History ==
Paekākāriki's close association with the railway began in 1886 when the Wellington and Manawatu Railway Company's line from Wellington to Longburn opened. Paekākāriki railway station was a large station despite the settlement's small size, as it was ideally located as a locomotive changeover point – powerful engines were required to tackle the difficult grades between Wellington and Paekākāriki, while lighter and more nimble ones were better suited to the gentle grades and straight track through the Kāpiti Coast and Horowhenua to Manawatū.

The New Zealand Railways Department (NZR) took over the Wellington and Manawatu Railway in December 1908, but Paekākāriki's status as an important depot remained unchanged. In 1940, the line from Wellington to Paekākāriki was electrified and Paekākāriki's depot was altered: it became the changeover point from electric to steam motive power, or electric to diesel from the 1950s onwards. Paekākāriki also was an important goods transfer point between NZR and its "Rail Air" service that operated out of Paraparaumu across Cook Strait, before the inter-island rail ferries were introduced. A large shed was constructed at Paekākāriki by the United States Marines stationed in the area for use with the Rail Air service during World War II.

In the late 1960s with steam traction coming to an end, the locomotive depot in Paekākāriki was closed and the diesel locomotives that replaced steam were based out of Wellington instead. The main engine shed was demolished along with several other buildings, but the Rail Air Shed, two signal boxes, amenities building and a turntable remained when Steam Incorporated acquired the site. New sheds were constructed to replace those demolished, and the Rail Air Shed and amenities buildings were acquired when it became available. While initially leasing a portion of the site, Steam Incorporated now owns the whole former depot site including the 70 ft turntable, to which the railways retain a right of access.

=== Steam Incorporated ===
As steam traction started to disappear from the NZR network, a group of enthusiasts united to preserve steam locomotives with the express intention of running them on the mainline network. At the time, all locomotives that had been preserved were solely for use on heritage railways or for static display as the NZR sold locomotives on the proviso that they would never again run on the NZR network, it was a radical concept.

Steam Incorporated was formed on 18 November 1972, and locomotives were purchased by the society or for the society by members. Until 1985, NZR had decreed that no steam locomotives were to run on mainlines. NZR then allowed one mainline excursion a year. In October 1988, following the success of the Ferrymead 125 celebrations, NZR agreed to lift the ban and charged enthusiasts to use the network. As a result, Steam Incorporated were able to run excursions on the network from their Paekākāriki base. In 1988, Steam Incorporated also acquired two DA class locomotives recently withdrawn by NZR.

== List of locomotives ==
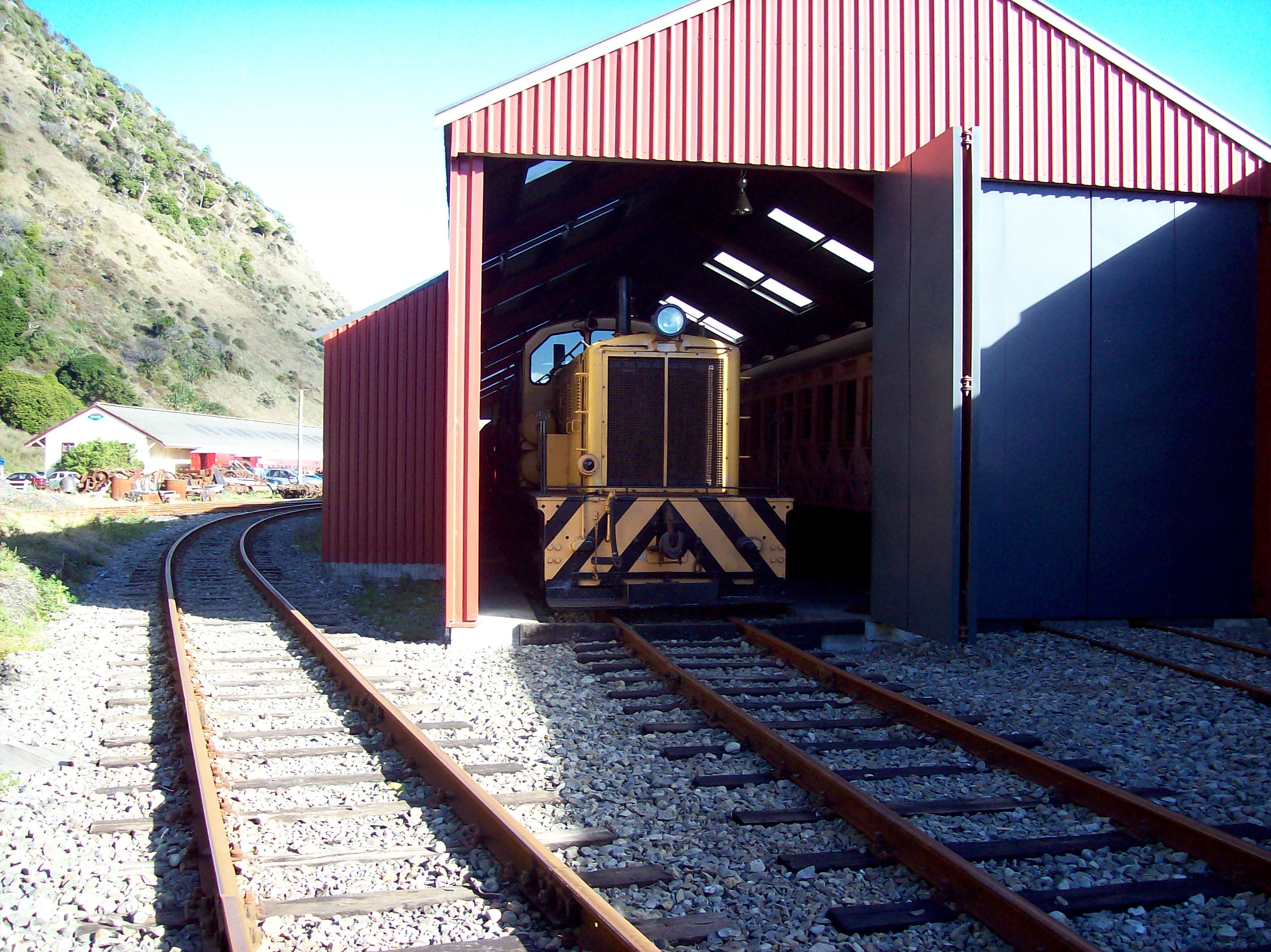
Ex-Ohai Railway Board no. 2, a diesel shunting locomotive, in Steam Incorporated's shed on 7 July 2007.

Key:	In Service	In Service, Main Line Certified	Under Overhaul/Restoration	Stored	Static Display	Scrapped

Number	Builder	Builder's Number	Year built	Arrived at Steam Inc	Notes
A^{B} 608	NZR Addington Workshops	163	1915	1993	First A^{B} built. Owned by the NZR&LS, previously statically displayed at Ferrymead. Leased to Steam Incorporated, 1993. Main line certified. Named Passchendaele
D^{A} 1410	General Motors	A800	1955	1988	Transferred back to Paekakariki from the Glenbrook Vintage Railway in June 2015. Main line certified.
D^{A} 1431	General Motors	57-135	1957	1988	Painted in unique livery for NZ Sesquicentennial, 1990. Main line certified.
D^{A} 1471	General Motors	A2017	1963	2012	Formerly part of the NZ Rail Heritage Collection. Leased to Steam Inc in 2004 but returned in 2007; brought outright in 2012 after storage at Hutt Workshops. Currently under restoration.
D^{C} 4375	Clyde Engineering	79/900 (Clyde Engineering makers No.)	1979	2021	Ex-Da 1540 built by General Motors Canada in 1967 then rebuilt by Clyde Engineering and numbered Dc 1585 in 1979 with cab numberboards only pre-TMS and Later-TMS 4375 on longhood for a brief time until 1980. Arrived at Paekakariki on 1 April 2021. Restoration completed on 8 August 2025, mainline certified.
D^{S} 202	Drewry	2526	1955	1985	Oldest shunter in Steam Inc's fleet. Used for various shunting duties around the society's depot. Operational.
J 1234	North British Locomotive Company	24557	1939	1974	Restored for main line use 1992. Formerly leased to the Glenbrook Vintage Railway. Transferred back to Steam Inc in June 2015. Awaiting an overhaul.
J^{A} 1271	NZR Hillside Workshops	394	1956	1978	Acquired as stripped hulk. Comprehensively restored to working order in 1997. Currently main line certified.
K 917	NZR Hutt Workshops	294	1934	2001	Used as a static boiler supply at Hutt Workshops prior to preservation. Stored as an incomplete hulk with the tender from K 928, originally brought as a spare boiler for K^{A} 945.
K^{A} 945	NZR Hutt Workshops	328	1939	1981	Purchased by Sir Len Southward in 1967. Stored in Taumaranui until 1975 and later donated to Steam Inc. in 1981. Overhauled to working order in April 1985. Withdrawn in May 1995 for 10 year inspection. Stored until 2014, currently undergoing major overhaul back to working order.
ORB2	Mitsubishi	1476	1967	1992	Built for the Ohai Railway Board in 1967. Withdrawn in 1992 and purchased by Reid McNaught, who brought it to Steam Inc. Operational.
T^{R} 160	A&G Price, Thames	182	1958	2015	Withdrawn from service in Kawerau in 2002. Transferred to Pahiatua in 2004 and stored there until 2015, when it was transferred to Paekakariki by road. Restored to running order, the locomotive is used for shunting duties around the depot.
W^{F} 386	NZR Addington Workshops	66/05	1905	1978	Withdrawn 1958. Saved for Preservation and moved to Taumarunui for 20 Years. Purchased by Steam Incorporated in 1978. Dismantled awaiting restoration.

|}

In Addition:

- J 1211 and K^{A} 942, now of Mainline Steam were originally stored at Paekakariki before restoration in the Auckland area.
- WMR #9/N 453 owned by the Wellington and Manawatu Railway Trust is currently based at Steam Incorporated, with some work having been carried out towards its restoration.
- NRZ 15A class Garratt 398, owned by the Flying Fifteen Locomotive Society arrived at Steam Incorporated in May 2011. The locomotive is being prepared for long-term storage, however, the group have eventual plans to run it on the mainline.
- 1909-built 0-4-0T Barclay #1181, acquired from Len Southward in the 1970s was owned by the group until it was sold in 2012 to a private owner for restoration, based at the Silver Stream Railway.
- A&G Price rail tractor N^{O} 152 was bought by Steam Incorporated in 1978. It was rendered surplus to the group's requirements in 1994 and is now with the Ormondville Rail Preservation Group.
- DSA 305 was purchased by Steam Incorporated in 1986 from the NZR. It was used until 1994 when it was sold to the Bay of Islands Vintage Railway, and has since been on-sold to a private owner at Cable Bay.
- The remains of W^{B} 292 and W^{B} 299, owned by Hugh McCracken, were stored at Paekakariki from 1989 until 2013 when they were moved to the Rimutaka Incline Railway Heritage Trust depot at Maymorn for restoration.

== Rolling stock ==
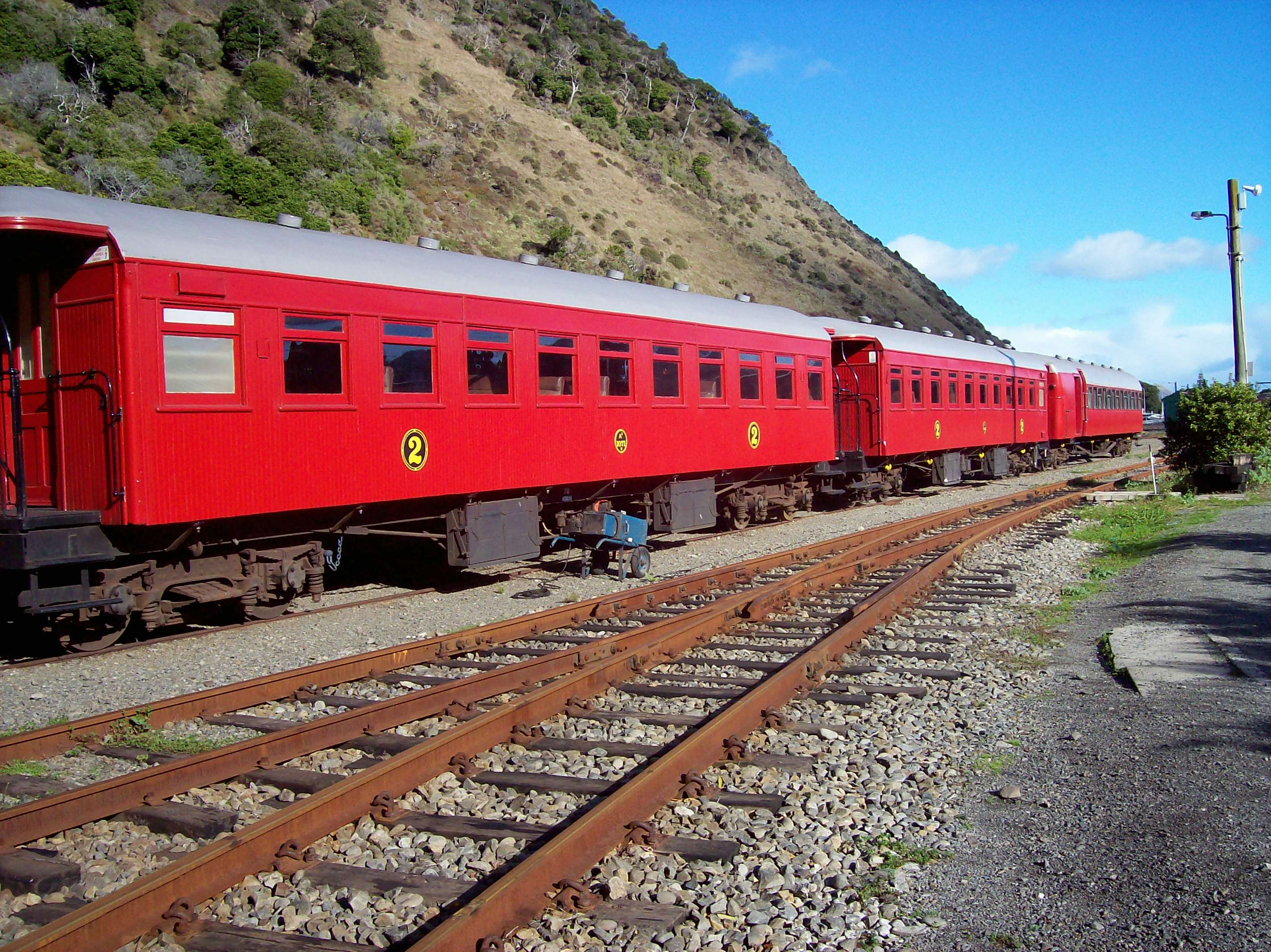
Some of Steam Incorporated's fleet of passenger carriages stored in their yard.

Steam Incorporated owns one of New Zealand's largest fleets of heritage passenger carriages certified for mainline operation on the regular national network. Originally painted in a unique chocolate brown livery with yellow lining to differentiate them from the carriages in service on regular trains, the paint was found to fade and look shabby, and when Tranz Rail, NZR's successor repainted their carriages in a blue livery in the early 1990s, Steam Incorporated reverted to the "Midland Red" paint scheme that had been used for most passenger carriages in New Zealand ever since the 1920s. Steam Incorporated own a variety of carriage types, such as five wide-bodied A^{A} class 50 ft wooden passenger carriages with balcony ends. In 2008, these carriages were repainted in "Pullman Green" for use in the North Island Main Trunk Railway centenary celebrations. In addition, Steam Incorparted have a number of 50-foot and 56-foot steel-clad passenger carriages, one of which has been converted for use as a buffet/souvenir car. The active fleet stands at twelve fully restored and mainline certified carriages, with one currently under restoration, one awaiting mainline certification and nine stored (4).

Along with passenger carriages, the society owns a number of guards vans and former goods wagons, some of which are certified for mainline operation as locomotive service wagons.

=== Carriages ===
Key:	In Service	In Service, Main Line Certified	Under Overhaul/Restoration	Stored	Static Display	Scrapped

Pre-TMS number	TMS number	Builder	Type	Year built	Year arrived	Notes
A 1859	A 56916	NZR Otahuhu Workshops	56' steel-panelled mainline carriage	1938	1984	Last 56-foot First Class car in original Main Trunk condition. Equipped with pressure ventilation. Purchased by Keith Magnussen in 1983, later donated to Steam Incorporated. Stored awaiting restoration.
A 1868	AS 56073	NZR Otahuhu Workshops	56' steel-panelled mainline carriage	1937	2013	Ex-Auckland charter fleet, used as a servery car. Purchased from KiwiRail Scenic Journeys in 2013. Currently under restoration.
A 1870	A 56105	NZR Otahuhu Workshops	56' steel-panelled mainline carriage	1937	2010	Surplus ex-Auckland suburban service in 1996. Sold to Waitara Railway Preservation Society, and stored at Brixton until 2010 when sold to Steam Incorporated. Currently stored.
A 1902	A 56156 A 2317	NZR Otahuhu Workshops	56' steel-panelled mainline carriage	1938	2013	Ex-Auckland charter fleet. Purchased from KiwiRail Scenic Journeys in 2013. Restored 2013 to 2014. Mainline certified.
A 1928	A 3389 AS 2500; ASO 27	NZR Otahuhu Workshops	56' steel-panelled mainline carriage	1939	2013	First 56-foot carriage rebuilt as a big window car in 1987, used as a survey car. Purchased from KiwiRail Scenic Journeys in 2013. Currently stored.
A 1933	A 3212 AO 221	NZR Addington Workshops	56' steel-panelled mainline carriage	1939		Large window observation car. Purchased from The Great Journeys of New Zealand in 2018. Transferred by rail to Paekakariki in Sept 2018. Currently stored awaiting overhaul.
A 1942	A 56453	NZR Otahuhu Workshops	56' steel-panelled mainline carriage	1939	1996	Surplus ex-Auckland suburban service in 1996. Under restoration, will be fitted with a South Island First Class-style Coupe compartment.
A 1943	A 56461	NZR Otahuhu Workshops	56' steel-panelled mainline carriage	1939	2010	Surplus ex-Auckland Suburban trains 1996. Sold to Gisborne City Vintage Railway, later on-sold to Waitara Railway Preservation Society. Sold to Steam Incorporated in 2010. Currently stored.
A 1947	A 3239 AO 83	NZR Otahuhu Workshops	56' steel-panelled mainline carriage	1939	2018	Rear window observation car. Purchased from The Great Journeys of New Zealand in 2018. Transferred by rail to Paekakariki in Sept 2018. Currently stored awaiting restoration.
A 1953	A 56544	NZR Otahuhu Workshops	56' steel-panelled mainline carriage	1939	2008	Ex-Auckland charter fleet. Sold to Steam Inc. in 2008. Restoration completed in 2012. Mainline certified.
A 1962	A 56333 A 2234	NZR Addington Workshops	56' steel-panelled mainline carriage	1940	2013	Ex-Auckland charter fleet. Purchased from KiwiRail Scenic Journeys in 2013. Mainline Certified.
A 1975	A 3022	NZR Otahuhu Workshops	56' 0" steel-panelled mainline coach	1945	2020	Owned by John and Rolf Christensen. Leased to Steam Inc., and arrived in June 2020. Mainline certified.
A 1989	A 56769	NZR Otahuhu Workshops	56' steel-panelled mainline carriage	1943	1996	Surplus ex-Auckland suburban service 1996. Restoration completed in 2003. Mainline certified.
A 2011	AB 3534	NZR Otahuhu Workshops	56' steel-panelled mainline carriage	1939	2008	Built as Vice Regal staff carriage A 2011. Later re-built as an AB buffet car for Endeavour service, later modified with reduced counter and additional seating. Withdrawn in 2007 and stored at Hutt Workshops. Purchased by Steam Inc. in 2008, and stored awaiting restoration.
A^{A} 1025	- - -	NZR Petone Workshops	50' wooden body, wide body mainline carriage	1908	1972	Previously under ownership by Forest Lakes Camp, Otaki. Currently stored, awaiting overhaul.
A^{A} 1030	A 4012 (in Preservation)	NZR Petone Workshops	50' wooden body, wide body mainline carriage	1909	1977	Obtained as a derelict from Hutt Workshops. Restored in 1981. Mainline certified.
A^{A} 1071	A 4029 (in Preservation)	NZR Petone Workshops	50' wooden body, wide-body mainline carriage	1909	1977	Withdrawn from NZR service in Auckland. Restored in 1977. First Steam Inc. carriage to be restored. Returned to service in February 2007 after wood-work repairs. Mainline certified.
A^{A} 1073	A 4035 (in Preservation)	NZR Petone Workshops	50' wooden body, wide-body mainline carriage	1909	1977	Withdrawn from NZR service in Auckland. Returned to service in 1979, car still has original style pressed steel internal ceiling. Mainline certified.
A^{A} 1265	A 4070 (in Preservation)	NZR Petone Workshops	50' wooden body, wide-body mainline carriage	1912	1977	Obtained as a derelict from Hutt Workshops. Restored and entered Steam Inc. service in 1981. Mainline certified.
A^{A} 1267	A 4087 (in Preservation)	NZR Petone Workshops	50' wooden body, wide-body mainline carriage	1912	1976	Obtained from Rotten Row at Marton, first carriage acquired by Steam Inc. Restored and entered Steam Inc. service in 1980. Still has original style pressed steel internal ceiling; first Steam Inc. car to be painted in red livery. Mainline certified.
A^{A} 1670	- - -	NZR Otahuhu Workshops	50' vitron panelled, wide-body suburban carriage	1930	2022	Obtained from Forest Lakes Camp, Otaki. In early stages of restoration.
A^{A} 1618	A 56006	NZR Addington Workshops	50' wooden body, steel panelled wide-body mainline carriage	1927	1982	One of the first batch of five 56-foot long carriages, originally built as a sleeping car. Restored as buffet and souvenir car by Steam Inc., entered service in 1984. Mainline certified.
A^{A} 1757	A 50215	NZR Otahuhu Workshops	50' steel-panelled wide-body mainline carriage	1932	1983	Entered Steam Inc. service in 1984. Withdrawn in 1994 for a comprehensive overhaul, overhaul restarted in 2005 and re-entered service in 2009. Mainline certified.
A^{A} 1769	A 50274	NZR Otahuhu Workshops	50' steel-panelled wide-body mainline carriage	1932	1981	Built by NZR as a First Class car but later had Second Class seats installed with generous leg room. Entered Steam Inc. service in 1984. Overhauled and returned to service in 1994. Mainline certified.
A^{A} 1783	A 50290	NZR Otahuhu Workshops	50' steel-panelled wide-body mainline carriage	1933	1983	Entered Steam Inc. service in 1984, withdrawn in 2002 for a comprehensive overhaul. Overhaul begun 2012. Restored in 2017. Mainline certified.
A^{L} 1917	AL 56255; AL 56066	NZR Otahuhu Workshops	56' steel-panelled mainline car-van	1939	1996	Converted to carvan at Otahuhu for suburban work in 1982, withdrawn in 1996. Sold to Steam Incorporated, former luggage compartment modified to provide space for loco support crew. Restored in 1997. Mainline certified.

=== Guards vans ===
Key:	In Service	In Service, Main Line Certified	Under Overhaul/Restoration	Stored	Static Display	Scrapped

Pre-TMS number	TMS number	Builder	Type	Year built	Year arrived	Notes
F 524	F 1164	NZR Otahuhu Workshops	50' wooden body guards van	1930	1986	Entered Steam Inc. service in 1988, withdrawn in 1993. Currently used as a photographic display vehicle.
F 609	F 2391	NZR Otahuhu Workshops	56' steel panelled guards van	1944	1990	Used on Southerner & Endeavour trains, then briefly used as a Way & Works vehicle. Stored awaiting future restoration.
F^{M} 20	FM 290 AG 239	Mitsubishi Heavy Industries	50' steel modular guards van	1977	2020	Owned by John and Rolf Christensen. Leased to Steam Inc., and arrived in June 2020. Rebuilt into an open observation van in 1994. Awaiting repainting. Mainline certified.
	FM 1254	Daewoo Heavy Industries	50' steel modular guards van	1981	2008	Withdrawn by NZR in 1988. Sold to a private owner in 1989, and stored at the Mainline Steam Trust Parnell Depot until 2008. Restored and entered Steam Inc. service in 2009. Last guards van in revenue freight use in Auckland area, still fitted with original interior.

=== Wagons ===
Key:	In service	In service, Mainline Certified	Under overhaul/restoration	Stored	Static display	Scrapped

Pre-TMS number	TMS number	Builder	Type	Year built	Year arrived	Notes
E^{UB} 1905	EA 2443	NZR Otahuhu Workshops	Flat deck	1938	1993	Originally built at U^{B} 948. Reclassified as E^{UB} 1905 in May 1944. Formerly owned by the Craven Crane Group. Ownership to Steam Inc. in 2009. Stored. Runner wagon for Crane 200.
E^{UB} 4184	EA 2679	NZR Hutt Workshops	Flat deck	c1952	1993	Originally built as U^{B} 1357 c1952. Reclassified as E^{UB} 4184 in December 1975. Crane runner for Crane 200. Formerly owned by the Craven Crane Group. Ownership to Steam Inc. in 2009. Stored.
K^{P} 1728	KP 8815	Mitsubishi Heavy Industries	Box	1964	c1993	Formerly owned by the New Zealand Railway and Locomotive Society. Ownership to Steam Inc. in July 2014. Stored.
K^{P} 2550	KP 17568 E 8338	Mitsubishi Heavy Industries	Box	1966	c1993	Formerly owned by the Craven Crane Group. Ownership to Steam Inc. in 2009. Stored. Reclassified as E 8338 in April 1990.
K^{P} 3421	KP 26822 E 7459	Mitsubishi Heavy Industries	Box	1968	N/A	Owned by the Rail Heritage Trust. Stored. Reclassified as E 7459 in May 1985.
K^{S} 4901	KS 16024 E 8817	NZR East Town Workshops	Box	1971	N/A	Owned by the Rail Heritage Trust. Stored.
L^{A} 14411		Metropolitan Cammell (assembled by NZR Addington Workshops)	High side	1938	N/A	Reclassified as E 4071 c1972. Stored.
L^{B} 2581	LB 6557	Samsung Moolsan	High side	1976	N/A	
	LBS 2355	N/A	High side	N/A	N/A	
M 1647		N/A	Low side	N/A	N/A	Stored. Owned by the Rail Heritage Trust.
N^{A} 1640	NA 2056 NAK 6323	NZR Addington Workshops	Flat deck	1977	N/A	Reclassified as NAK in 1987. Stored. Owned by the Rail Heritage Trust.
U^{B} 326		NZR Addington Workshops	Flat deck	1913	c1993	Formerly owned by the Craven Crane Group. Ownership to Steam Inc. in 2009. Stored.
U^{C} 802	UC 162	N/A	Tank	1927	N/A	Stored.
U^{C} 804	UC 185	NZR Petone Workshops	Tank	1928	N/A	Mainline certified.
U^{C} 1294	UC 2252	NZR Addington Workshops	Tank	1949	N/A	Stored.
U^{C} 1315	UC 2471	NZR Addington Workshops	Tank	1954	2001	Restored 2001 to 2004. Used to transport water. Mainline certified.
U^{C} 1345	UC 2816	NZR Otahuhu Workshops	Tank	1964	N/A	Stored.
U^{R} 2026	UR 2563	NZR Otahuhu Workshops	Flat Deck	1964	N/A	Used for transportation of coal. Mainline certified.
X^{P} 3032	XP 733 E 6734	NZR East Town Workshops	Ventilated Box	1966	1988	Reclassified as E 6734 in 1982. Owned by the Rail Heritage Trust. Stored.
Y^{C} 755	YC 602	NZR East Town Workshops	Ballast	1960	N/A	Stored.
Z 331	Z 814	NZR Addington Workshops	Box	1944	N/A	Stored.
Z 341	Z 913	NZR Addington Workshops	Box	c1944	N/A	Stored.
Z 370	Z 1158	NZR Otahuhu Workshops	Box	c1946	N/A	Stored.
Z^{M} 1203	ZM 597	NZR Addington Workshops	Box	1975	N/A	Owned by the Rail Heritage Trust. Stored.

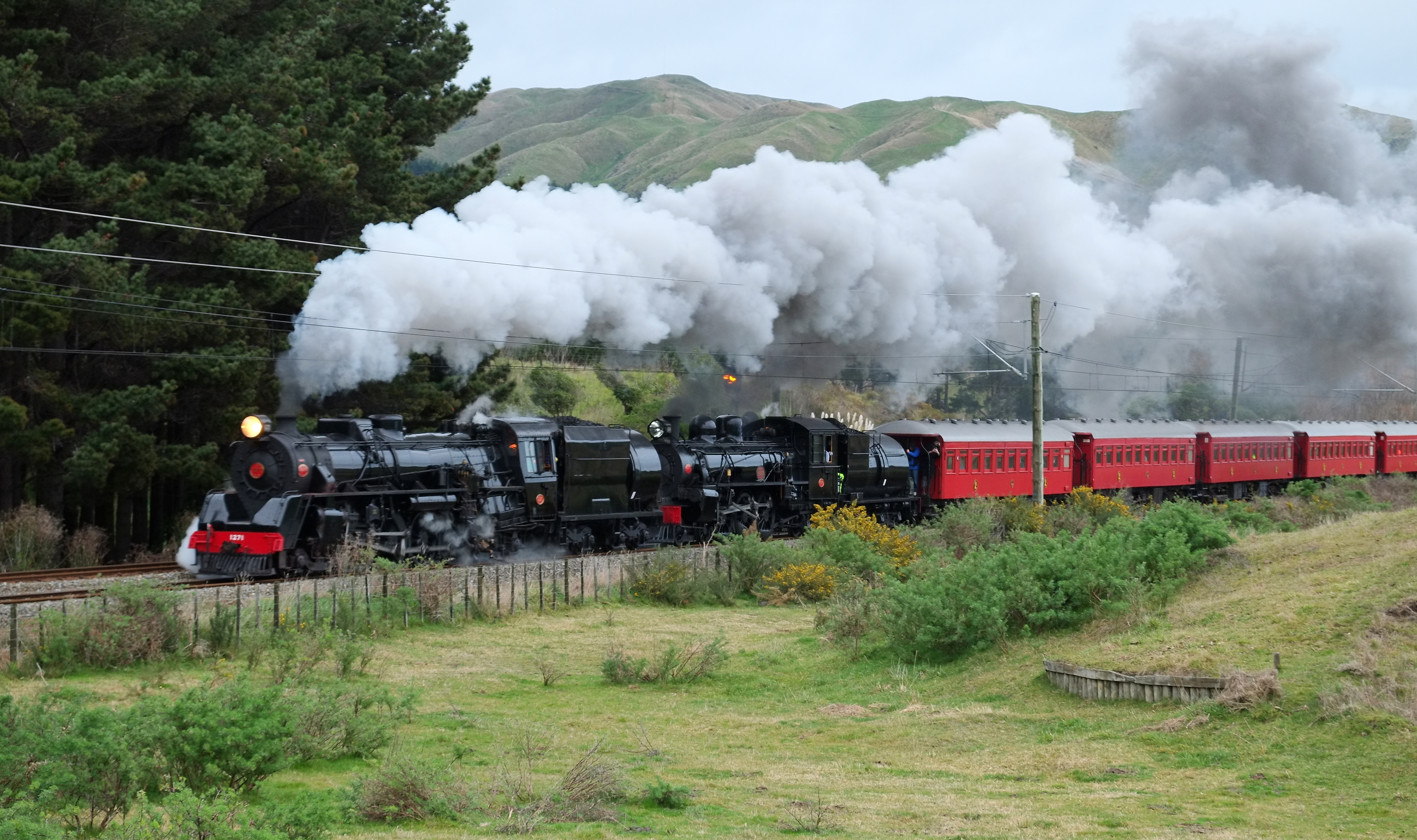
Locomotives Ja 1271 and Ab 608 pulling historic carriages on Steam Inc's 18 July 2015 "Double Thunder" excursion

== Excursions ==
Steam Incorporated has operated or participated in excursions to almost all parts of the national railway network that has been open since the late 1970s. As one of the first organisations to operate a private carriage fleet, excursions have been run since 1978. During the early years of the society's existence, NZR would not permit heritage operators to use their own locomotives on the national network, thus limiting the society's locomotive activities to the area of The Engine Shed. Since 1985 however, this policy has been abandoned and Steam Incorporated have run the majority of their excursions using society-owned Steam and Diesel locomotives. Popular excursions have been through the central North Island, annual "Art Deco" expresses to Napier, to the centennial celebrations at Dunedin Railway Station in October 2006, and to the centennial celebrations at Feilding in October 2008. Some excursions are operated solely by Steam Incorporated crews with the society's own equipment (with the locomotive driver and fireman supplied by KiwiRail), while the others have been in conjunction with the other New Zealand preservation societies and their locomotives, such as the annual "Double Drivers" excursions featuring two K^{A} class locomotives.

Some of the more notable involvements Steam Incorporated have had were in May 1993 when K^{A} 945 and Steam Incorporated carriages toured for 3 weeks around New Zealand on the "Cadbury Crunchie Train Tour", and in August 2008 when Steam Incorporated operated the Parliamentary Special N.I.M.T. Centennial train on behalf of ONTRACK, using primarily Steam Incorporated carriages and a mix of Steam Incorporated and many other mainline certified locomotives.
