= Dunedin Peninsula and Ocean Beach Railway =

Railway in new Zealand

Map

Dunedin Peninsula and Ocean Beach Railway was a railway line in Dunedin, South Island of New Zealand. The company was incorporated in 1874, and construction began in December 1875, and the 3.5 kilometres (2.2 mi) railway opened to Ocean Beach on 23 March 1876. Extensions were later opened to Anderson's Bay (in 1877), Forbury, Musselburgh and Tahora Bay.

Competition from horse trams saw regular passenger services cease in 1882, with the original company wound up, only for a new company formed that ran race-day trains ran to Forbury Park Raceway until 1904. The last passenger train was a special troop train in 1914, and goods services ran sporadically until 1938.

It closed in 1942, and part of it is now the Ocean Beach Railway, a heritage line.
