= Feilding and District Steam Rail Society =

Railway organisation in New Zealand

Coordinates: 40.2273°S 175.5707°E

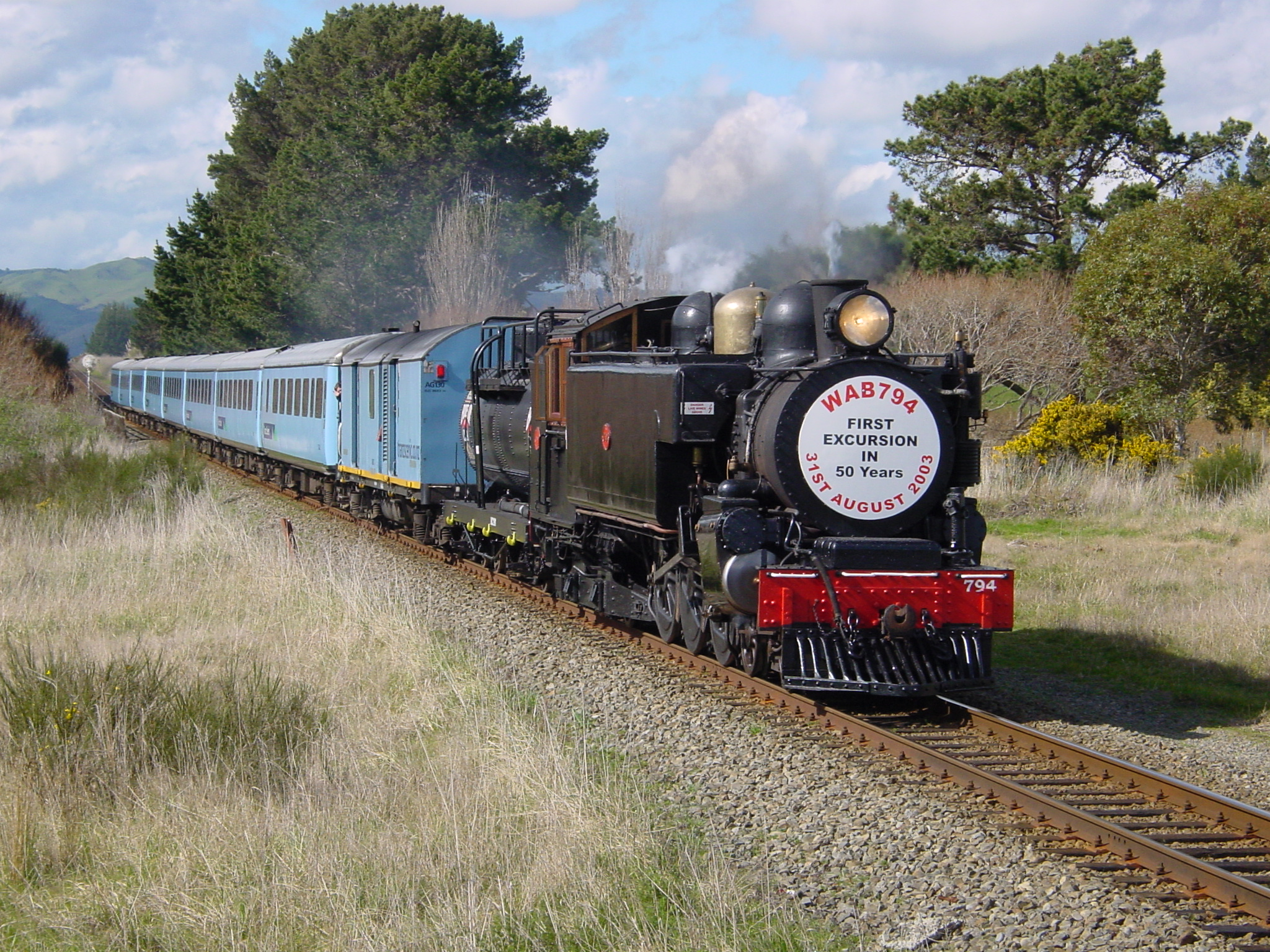
Feilding Steam Rail's W^{AB} class locomotive on excursion, 31 August 2003.

The Feilding and District Steam Rail Society, also known as Feilding Steam Rail, is a railway preservation society located in Feilding in the Manawatū region of New Zealand. The society has restored or is restoring locomotives and wagons once used on New Zealand's national rail network, with its main locomotive being a W^{AB} class tank locomotive, W^{AB} 794. The society also has X 442 and F 163, the only F class in mainline running condition.

The society also possesses two small diesel shunters, DSA227 and TR13, along with a large mainline diesel locomotive, D^{A} 1401, and a varied collection of rolling stock including both passenger and freight wagons.

The society's depot includes the turntable from Palmerston, a town in north Otago in the South Island, as well as the Taonui station building that used to be located near Feilding on the North Island Main Trunk railway at the junction with the short-lived Taonui Branch.

A Feilding & Districts Steam Rail Society train and driver at Feilding Railway Station

Feilding Steam Rail operates excursions from its Feilding base to locations such as Whanganui, Ohakune, Dannevirke, and Pahiatua.

When severe rainfall and floods caused destructive slips in the Manawatū Gorge in 2004, the society operated sightseeing trains through the Gorge.

== Rolling stock ==
=== Steam locomotives ===
- F 163, named "Ivanhoe" built by Dübs & Company, builder's number: 1542. Withdrawn from NZR in service 1924, arrived at Feilding and District Steam Rail Society February 1979. Entered NZR in July 1881. In 1963, it was named Ivanhoe (formerly used by F 241). Withdrawn on 10 October 1964, it was placed into storage at Arthurs Pass until being used by the NZR for special services. In February 1979, it was leased to the AR&PS for display over a weekend. It was then restored to operational condition in the 1980s. During this time, it was used in Wellington. It was purchased by the Rail Heritage Trust of New Zealand in 1993. In 2002, it was placed on lease to the F&DSRS.
