= NZR V class =

New Zealand V class
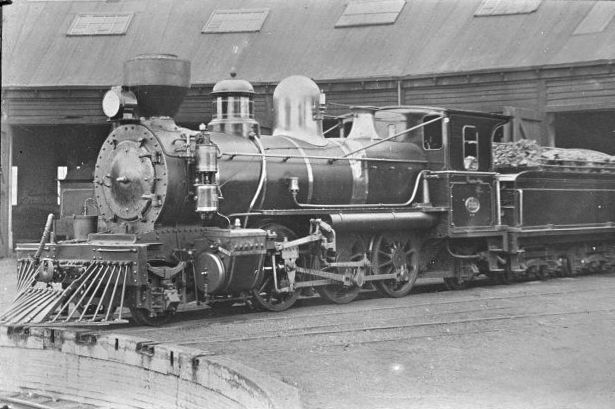
- V class tender locomotive. Picture from the AP Godber Collection, Alexander Turnbull Library
Type and origin
- Power type: Steam
- Builder: Nasmyth, Wilson and Company, Manchester, United Kingdom
- Build date: 1885
- Total produced: 13
Specifications
- Configuration
  - Whyte: 2-6-2
- Gauge: 3 ft 6 in (1,067 mm)
- Wheel diameter: 49 in (1,245 mm)
- Adhesive weight: 23.7 long tons (24.1 t; 26.5 short tons)
- Total weight: 53.5 long tons (54.4 t; 59.9 short tons)
- Fuel type: Coal
- Firebox
  - Grate area: 16 sq ft (1.5 m^{2})
- Boiler pressure: 135 psi (931 kPa)
- Heating surface: 862 sq ft (80.1 m^{2})
- Cylinders: Two
- Cylinder size: 15 in × 20 in (381 mm × 508 mm)
- Loco brake: Steam
Performance figures
- Maximum speed: 88 km/h (55 mph)
- Tractive effort: 9,890 lbf (44.0 kN)
Career
- Number in class: 13
- Locale: Wellington and Manawatu Railway, Main South Line, Marton – New Plymouth Line.
- Disposition: Two full locomotives recovered from the Oreti River; parts from several others in other locations also extant

The New Zealand V class steam locomotive was used on New Zealand's railway network from 1885 onwards. They were operated by New Zealand Government Railways and the Wellington and Manawatu Railway Company.

== Introduction ==
The heavy increase in traffic by the early 1880s necessitated a design for a new class of passenger locomotive. The V class was conceived as an enlarged version of the 2-4-2 NZR K class of 1877. Instead of the K class's four coupled wheels, six coupled wheels were used. The order was placed with Nasmyth, Wilson and Company of Manchester. It took seven years for delivery to be made and then it was found that the engines were 5 and a half tons overweight without their tender.

As a result, the NZGR refused to accept the locomotives until the weight was pared down to an acceptable level. However, by the time they were modified, the engines had been superseded by the American-built NZR N class of similar dimensions.

The Wellington and Manawatu Railway Company also ordered three of those locomotives, numbers 6, 7, and 8, at a cost of about £6,000 each (equivalent to about $1 million in 2011). They were fitted with an ornate Rogers-styled wooden cab with Gothic windows, and an extended smokebox crowned with a copper-capped funnel. They could be fired with "any light fuel" including wood and were very slightly heavier than the NZR version. They had inside frames and journals on both pony trucks. When the WMR was taken over by the NZR in 1908, they were included in the V class.

The locomotives had one weakness in their frames, just behind the cylinders. This weak spot, when stressed, would break; this occurred when the Branxholme locomotives were dumped, thus rendering their frames beyond repair. The Mararoa Junction locomotives may have suffered similarly.

== Withdrawal ==
The first withdrawals of the V class began around 1925 and ended in the early 1930s. Most of the engines were dumped as stripped hulks comprising the boiler, frames, cylinders and wheels at the Branxholme Locomotive Dump in 1927. V 126 and V 127 were dumped as substantially more complete hulks at Mararoa Junction, in October 1928, complete with their cabs and tenders. V 132 was dismantled at the Bealey Quarry and its frames dumped there.

The three WMR engines were withdrawn the same time and their boilers removed for stationary use or sale. The fate of the 3 WMR V's is unknown, though there has been some speculation that one might have been dumped at Branxholme. One of the boilers from these engines was unearthed by KiwiRail in 2009 during construction of the Kai Iwi tunnel bypass.

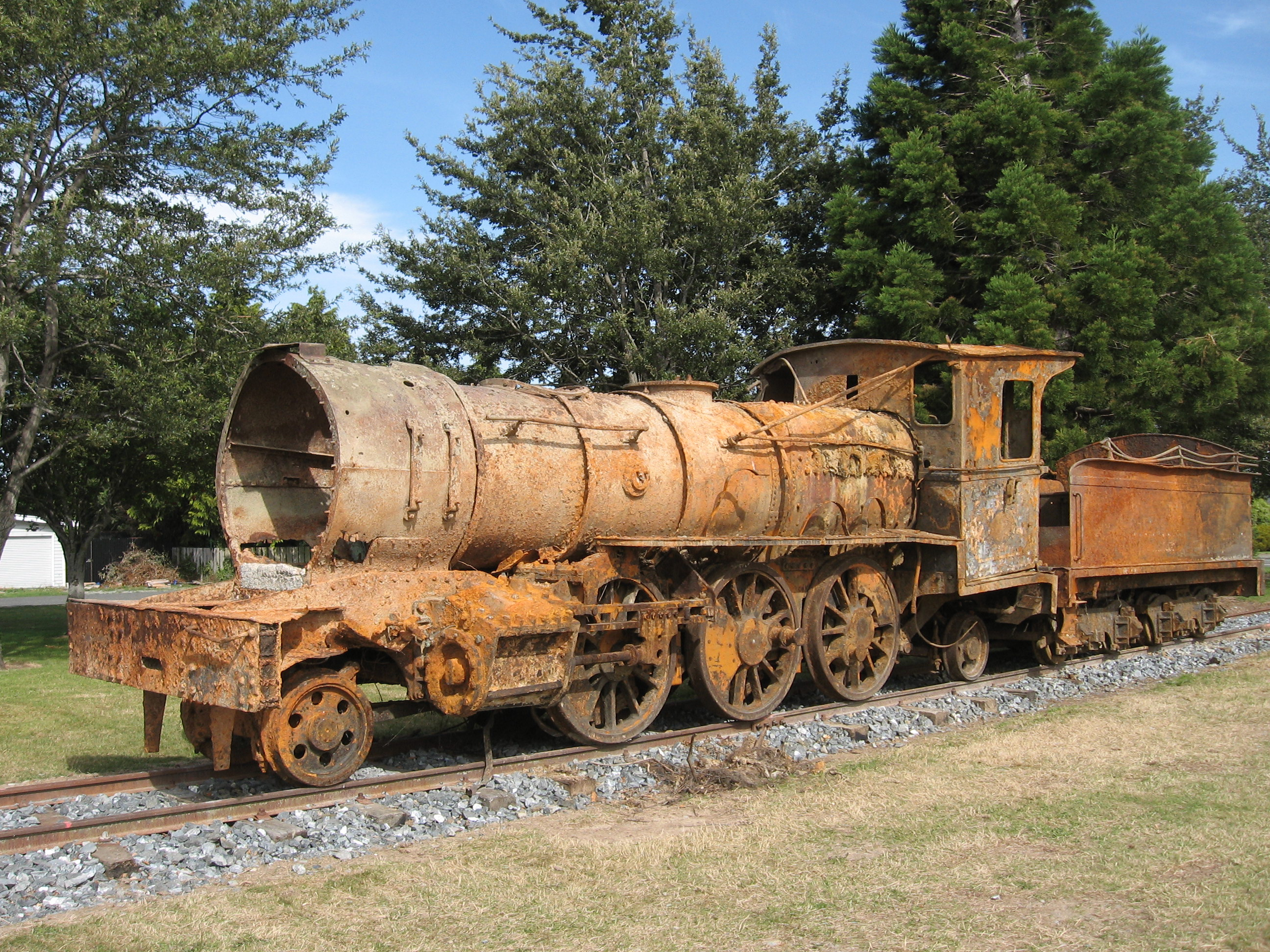
V 127 at Lumsden

== Preservation ==
In 1999, enthusiast Tony Bachelor salvaged the remains of locomotives V 35, V 125, and V 136 from Braxholme. Due to the weakness in the frames, the frame of V 132 and a Nasmyth Wilson pony truck were recovered from the Bealey Quarry. It was intended that the locomotives would be restored by the Hooterville Charitable Trust at Waitara, but this later fell through and Bachelor moved the remnants to his property in Ashhurst.

In 2009, the parts of the four Vs, along with a boiler found during the Kai Iwi deviation construction, were donated to the Feilding and District Steam Rail Society. The parts were stored at the F&DSR depot in the Feilding yard, but now they were scrapped.

In 2018, the remains of two V class locomotives were investigated at Mararoa Junction with a view to recovery and static restoration by the Lumsden Heritage Trust.

During late January 2020, the Lumsden Heritage Trust successfully recovered 1885 V-class 127 from the dump site in the Oreti River after a recovery effort and planning that spanned six years. They had also wanted to recover V-class 126, but in the words of the Lumsden Heritage Trust, logistics got the better of them on the day, despite a mammoth effort. No. 127's recovered locomotive and tender are sitting on their wheels and bogies on a specially built siding at the Lumsden Railway Precinct. Then on Wednesday 26 February 2020, the Trust commenced a second attempt at recovering V-class No. 126. Learning from the first attempt they first winched 126 and tender closer to the river bank and onto gravel prior to re-attempting the lift, which was reported as being easier than lifting 127. The recovery of the two V-class locomotives has garnered media attention as far away as the UK and the Trust's Lumsden base has seen an influx of interested tourists and visitors.
