= Petone Workshops =

Coordinates: 41°13′22.94″S 174°51′58.48″E

- Company type: Division of NZR
- Industry: Railways
- Predecessor: Pipitea Point Workshops
- Founded: 1876; 150 years ago
- Defunct: 1929; 97 years ago
- Fate: Replaced
- Successor: Hutt Workshops
- Headquarters: Hutt City, New Zealand
- Area served: Wellington region
- Services: Heavy rail maintenance and vehicle assembly
- Parent: New Zealand Government Railways (NZGR)

The Petone Workshops were a government-owned railways maintenance and repair facility located in Petone, in Lower Hutt in the Wellington region of New Zealand's North Island. It took over construction and maintenance of rolling stock in the Wellington region from the Pipitea Point facility, starting in 1876, and became the only such facility in the region from 1878 until the opening of the replacement Hutt Workshops facility in 1929.

== History ==
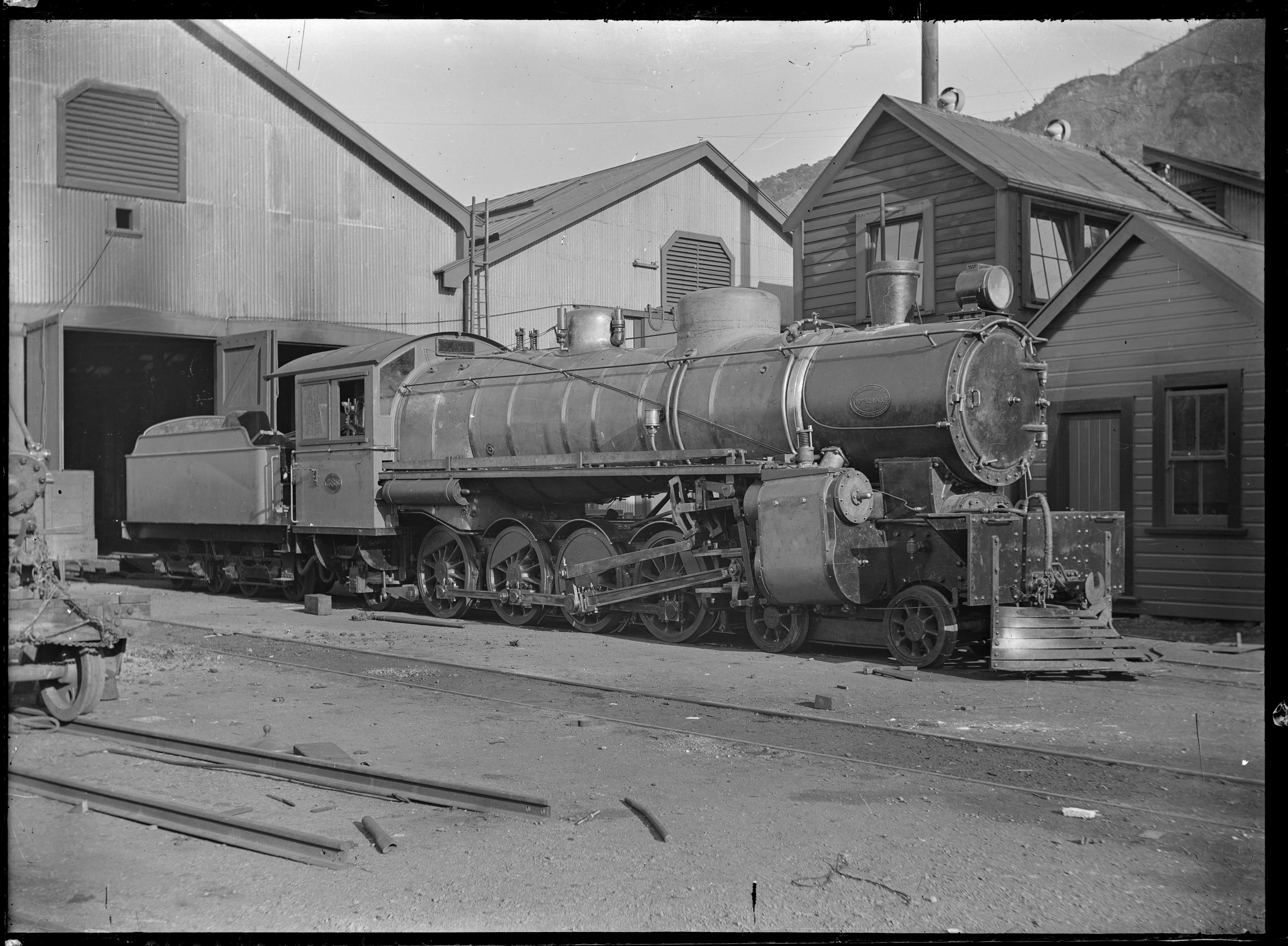
X class 588, photographed leaving Petone Workshops, circa 1913. Godber Collection, Alexander Turnbull Library

=== Predecessor ===
The first railway workshops in the Wellington region were near Wellington's first railway station at Pipitea Point. These workshops started out as a set of storage sheds for rolling stock when the first section of the Wairarapa Line was being constructed from 1872 to 1874. Later a repair and erecting shop was built at the site at the behest of Messrs Brogden and Sons, who arranged for the workshops to be fitted out with equipment imported from England. The building was 100 ft (30 m) long by 48 ft (15 m) wide, with a seaward side lean-to 50 ft (15 m) long and 24 ft (7.3 m) wide. A single road entered the building, in which facilities were provided for blacksmiths with four forges, woodworking and carpentry, and a machine shop. A stationary steam engine was used to power the machinery using a system of shafts and belts. A 10-ton overhead crane straddled the track.

=== Replacement at Petone ===
The Pipitea Workshops site had not long been in operation when the volume of work required of it expanded beyond its capacity. Several sites for a new railway workshops facility were suggested, and it was eventually decided that Petone was the best option. In 1876, a small start was made on the new facility with the construction of a shed for the storage of four new Fell-type locomotives until they were required for the construction of the Rimutaka Incline.

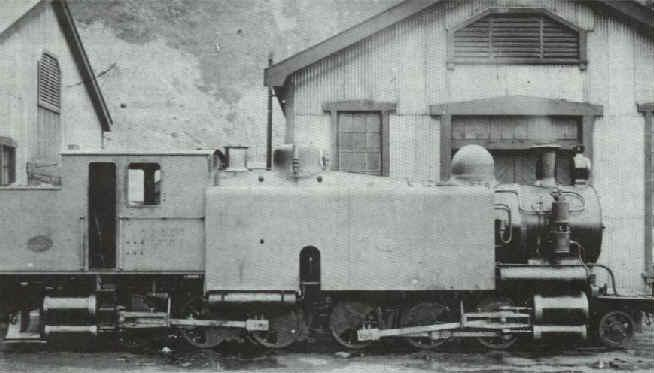
New locomotive E66 at Petone Workshops in February 1906.

The Petone Workshops did not start to take shape until 1878 when, under the direction of the manager of the Wellington Section, Mr Ashcroft, work began in earnest, a decision largely prompted by the destruction of the Pipitea Workshops in a fire. Many of the buildings that would comprise the workshops facilities were erected between 1878 and 1881, though the nature of the site allowed for the later construction of other buildings as required. The arrangement of the workshops yard included a machine shop, boiler shop, and foundry at the northern (station) end, and a car and wagon depot, the lifters and paint shop at the southern end.

At the time Western Hutt Road did not exist and the Railways Department owned all of the land up to the base of the hills. The workshops began expanding beyond the confines of the original station yard early in the 20th century. Some railway houses were located at the periphery to house workshop and station staff.

=== Operations ===
Petone assembled or maintained hundreds of locomotives and carriages.

Seven "F", "L", and "J" class locomotives were rebuilt into other classes at Petone. The only locomotives built at Petone were three NZR L class in 1903; and E-66 in 1906, later derisively dubbed "Pearson's Dream".

Perhaps some of the best-known locomotives to frequent the Petone Workshops were the H-class Fells used on the Rimutaka Incline. From 1900 these locomotives were in need of new boilers and annual returns show that while this work was done there was one locomotive at a time at Petone undergoing major repairs leaving the other five locomotives to handle the traffic. Other changes made at the time included the fitting of steel Belpaire fireboxes, larger cabs with trapdoors in the roof, and a second funnel to separate the two exhausts (a change that was reverted several years later). This pattern of one of the six H-class locomotives at a time being at Petone (and later Hutt) for repairs seems to have been fairly standard, with annual returns showing this to be the case for most years.

Petone was involved in the assembly of various experimental railcars following trials of an earlier type of railway carriage based on an idea from the United States. Due to the inadequacy of the types of motive power available at the time, these experiments were unsuccessful.

The first railway carriage in service in the Wellington region was assembled at Petone in 1914 using bodywork built there and an underframe and traction equipment from Westinghouse Electric and Manufacturing Company. The power plant was a 6-cylinder petrol engine with a 90 hp (67 kW) generator driving two 60 hp (45 kW) electric motors, for a maximum speed of 35 mph (56 km/h). It was to be used on the Johnsonville line with a trailer, but the grades proved to be too much for the car alone. After frequent mechanical difficulties, it was withdrawn in 1917.

Another early petrol-electric railway carriage assembled at Petone entered service in 1916. It used bodywork manufactured at Petone; underframe, bogies and transmission from Thomas Transmission Ltd. of the United Kingdom; and a motor from J. Tyler and Sons. After a few months' service, a vital part broke and could not be replaced until after World War I. In 1920, when the replacement part arrived and the car was put back into service, it proved to be unreliable and was withdrawn in 1925.

Three more railcars were constructed at Petone in 1925 and 1926. The 1925 model did not survive tests on the Hutt lines. It caused its passengers to experience an uncomfortable pitching motion, necessitating its withdrawal. The 1926 models were more like small motor busses on flanged wheels with an 11 ft (3.4 m) long body. They first saw service on the Greytown Branch before being transferred to the Glenham Branch and Switzers Branch where they were withdrawn in 1930.

In the 1920s, workshops around the country were upgraded with electric power plants. Petone had been relying on a gas power plant, and this was replaced between 1925 and 1927 with electric motors.

=== Demise ===
A Royal Commission established in 1924 to examine the issue of railway workshop facilities around the country reported that much of Petone's machinery was out of date or obsolete, and that there were serious congestion problems owing to the lack of space for expansion.

Following the recommendations of the Commission, the Railways Department embarked on a three-year programme of workshop upgrades in 1925. Two sites for a replacement facility were considered, at Tawa Flat and Woburn, with the latter option being selected. Eighty acres of land were set aside at a new industrial area behind Hutt Park for the new workshops. The Hutt Workshops were completed in 1929, resulting in the transfer of all functions from Petone to the new site and the closure of the Petone Workshops.

Following closure the site was cleared of buildings, with some structures moved adjacent to the new workshops to form the NZR Road Services bus garage. The only Petone workshops building left standing on the site was a relatively new structure, erected in 1912. This building was finally demolished in 2012 to make way for the realignment of State Highway 2 through Petone.

== Today ==
Construction of the Western Hutt Road, realignment of the Petone station yard, and neighbouring industrial, commercial and urban development have obliterated any sign of the workshops.
