= NZR P class (1885) =

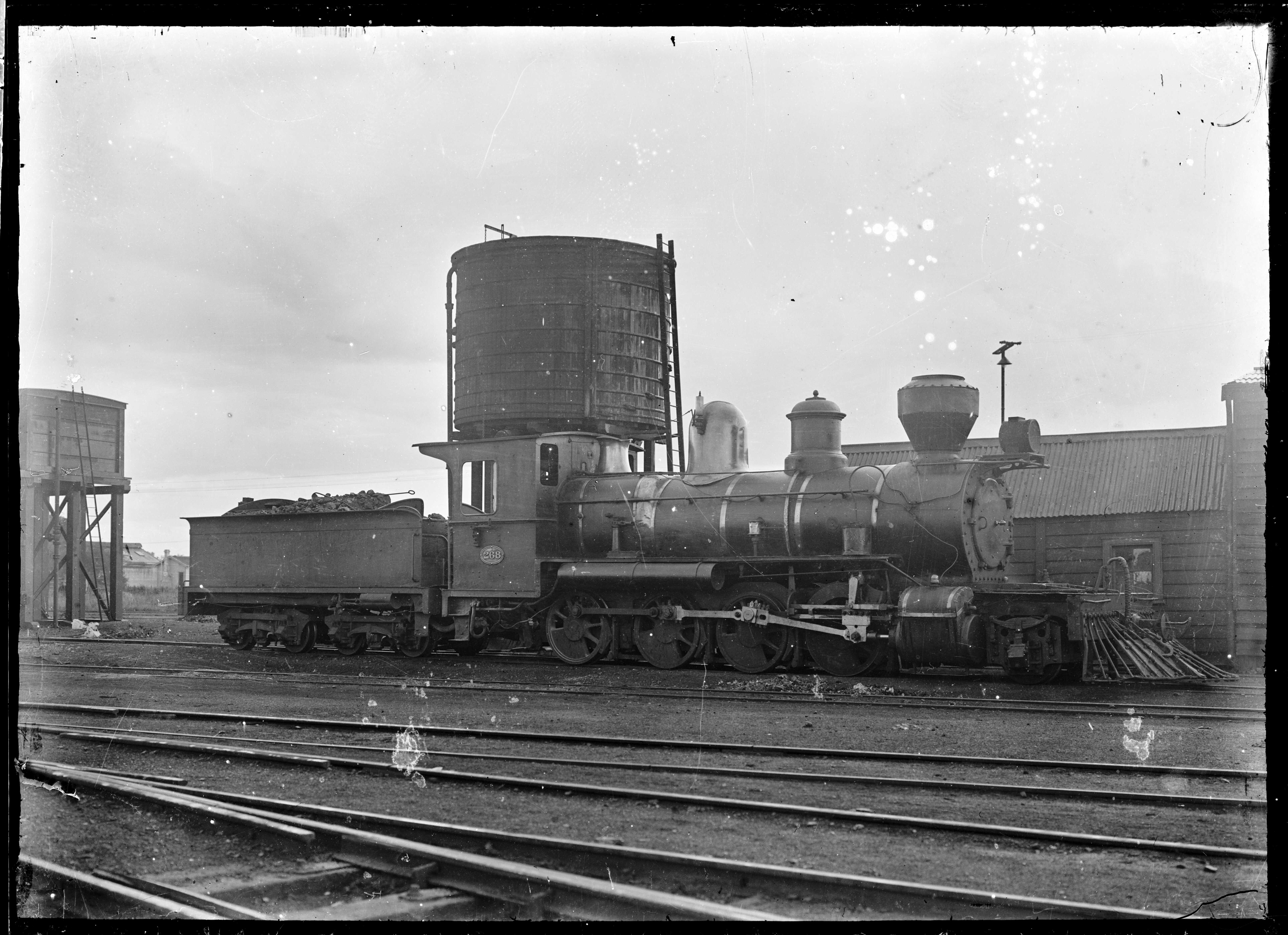
- P 268, with a steel cab, beside a water tank at Frankton.
Type and origin
- Power type: Steam
- Builder: Nasmyth, Wilson & Co.
- Serial number: 272–281
- Build date: 1885
- Total produced: 10
Specifications
- Configuration
  - Whyte: 2-8-0
  - UIC: 1′D n2G
- Gauge: 3 ft 6 in (1,067 mm)
- Driver dia.: 41 in (1,041 mm)
- Length: 50 ft 6 1/2 in (15.41 m)
- Adhesive weight: 27.7 long tons (28.1 t; 31.0 short tons)
- Loco weight: 32.5 long tons (33.0 t; 36.4 short tons)
- Tender weight: 20 long tons (20 t; 22 short tons)
- Fuel type: Coal
- Fuel capacity: 2.2 long tons (2.2 t; 2.5 short tons)
- Water cap.: 1,300 imp gal (5,900 L; 1,600 US gal)
- Firebox
  - Grate area: 15.8 sq ft (1.47 m^{2})
- Boiler pressure: 135 psi (931 kPa)
- Heating surface: 858 sq ft (79.7 m^{2})
- Superheater: None
- Cylinders: Two, outside
- Cylinder size: 15 in × 20 in (381 mm × 508 mm)
Performance figures
- Maximum speed: 20 mph (32 km/h)
- Tractive effort: 11,415 lbf (50.78 kN)
Career
- Operators: New Zealand Railways Department
- Locale: Auckland, Westland, Otago, Southland.
- Delivered: 1886
- First run: 8 February 1886
- Last run: October 1930
- Retired: 1930
- Withdrawn: October 1930
- Preserved: Four
- Disposition: 4 preserved, 6 scrapped

The P class is a class of steam locomotives built to haul freight trains on the national rail network of New Zealand. The class consisted of ten individual locomotives ordered from the British company of Nasmyth, Wilson and Company in 1885, but miscommunications about the weight limitations imposed on the locomotives meant they did not start work until 1887. This debacle came at a time when the New Zealand Railways Department (NZR) was suffering from a lack of motive power to work on its rapidly expanding network and was part of what prompted a shift towards American and home-grown manufacturers.

The classification of this class as "P" was the first example of the re-use of a classification that had previously been used for an earlier class. The members of the P class of 1876 had been sold to private companies or the Public Works Department, leaving the classification unused. The Railways Department chose to assign it to this class, setting a pattern that was followed with other classes in years to come, with the most prominent example being the A class of 1906 re-using the classification of the A class of 1873.

Initially, seven of the P class locomotives were deployed in Otago, with the remaining three based in Auckland, and in 1899, the Auckland fleet expanded to four when one was transferred north from Otago. The locomotives started their lives with wooden cabs in a Gothic style, but they were later replaced with steel cabs.

== In service ==
The P class locomotives were designed primarily for pulling freight trains. However, they were also capable of working passenger trains as required, and photographs exist of the engines occasionally pulling special excursion trains. Some changes were found necessary to obtain the best performance from them; the smokeboxes were extended, and the original Belpaire-type boilers were replaced with a new type to an NZR design.

The passenger equivalent of the P class was the V class 2-6-2 tender locomotives, which were designed primarily for express passenger work. The locomotives had boilers of similar dimensions but were not interchangeable, as well as a shared design of tender. The later P class steel cab was also adapted for use on the V class.

By 1926, all four Auckland members of the P class had been withdrawn from service, and the six southern members were retired within the next four years. Multiple members of the class are known to have been dumped in rivers to provide riverbank stability and halt erosion.

== Preservation ==
Four P class locomotives have been rescued for preservation. All were salvaged from locomotive dump sites in Otago and Southland as incomplete hulks.

In 1992, then-Dunedin based group Project Steam salvaged the remains of P 25 and P 107 from Beaumont on the former Roxburgh Branch. Both locomotives were moved to Dunedin for restoration; due to the poor condition of P 107's frame, the locomotive's frame was swapped with that from its sister locomotive. In 2009, the rolling chassis of P 107 was trucked from Dunedin to Springfield for storage at the Midland Rail Heritage Trust's centre, where the restoration will be completed. Both locomotives were dumped with their tenders and other fittings still attached, and so are more complete than other examples of the type.

In 2004, the Ohai Railway Board Heritage Trust salvaged the remains of P 60 and P 133 from the Branxholme locomotive dumpsite on the Wairio Branch. Both were moved to the group's workshop at Wairio where they were placed in outside storage. In 2014, the hulk of P 133 was moved from Wairio to Mosgiel, pending transport to Middlemarch where it will be stored pending the funding needed to restore it to working order. Both of the ORBHT engines were more heavily stripped and are missing many parts; P 60 was also dumped with the boiler of a classmate temporarily bolted on; the boiler later came apart from the frames, resulting in the salvage of the frames only. P 60 later was put on static display in Lumsden there are currently no plans to restore the locomotive.

== See also ==
- P class of 1876
- Wellington and Manawatu Railway Trust
