= New Zealand DSA class locomotive =

New Zealand DSA class
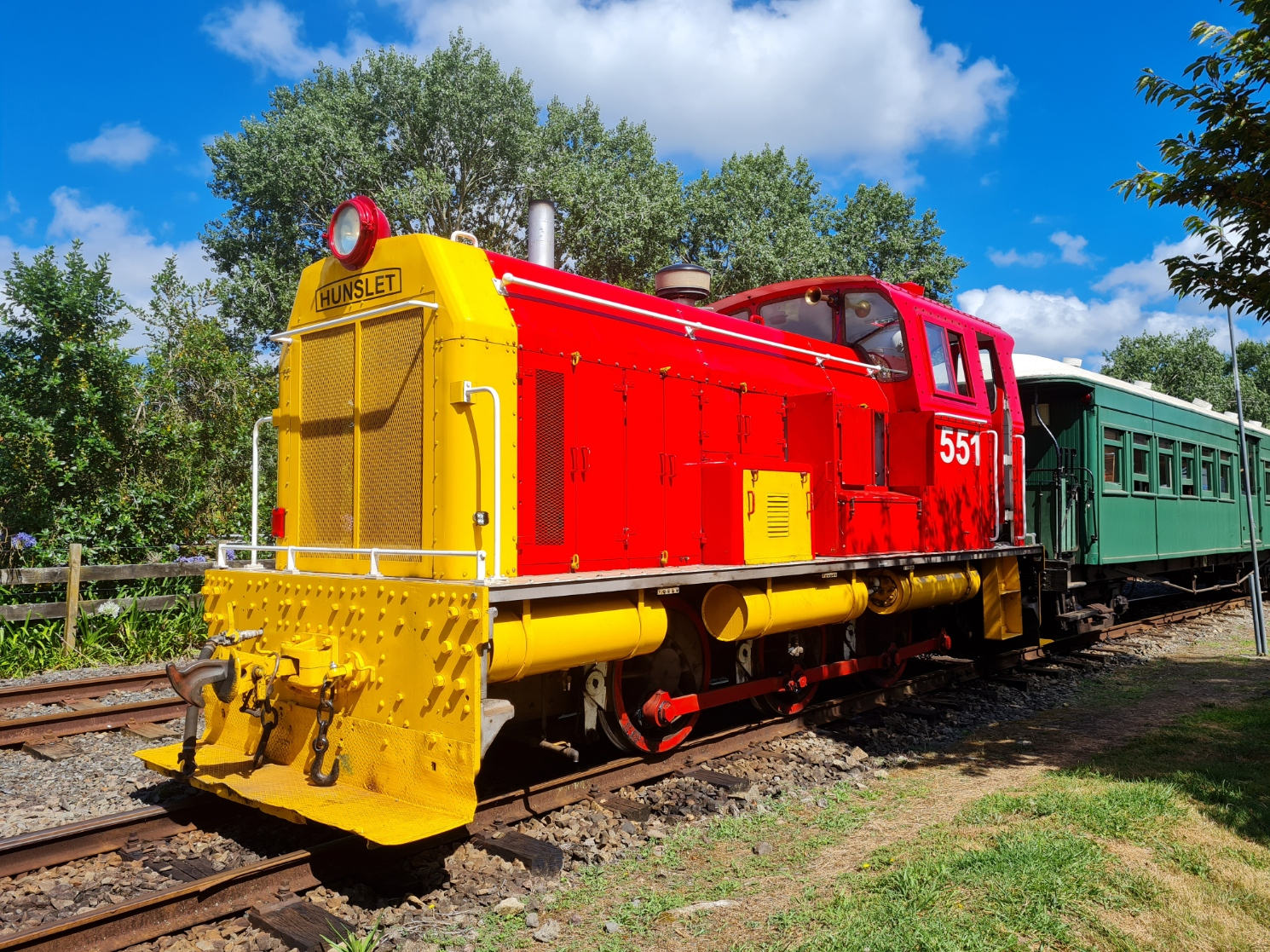
- DSA551 at Waikino on the Goldfields Railway, 2 January 2022
Type and origin
- Power type: Diesel-Mechanical/Hydraulic
- Builder: W. G. Bagnall (10); Vulcan Foundry for the Drewry Car Co (19); Hunslet (15); Mitsubishi Heavy Industries (11)
- Build date: 1953-1967
Specifications
- Configuration
  - AAR: 0-6-0
- Gauge: 1,067 mm (3 ft 6 in)
- Tender weight: Zm
Performance figures
- Maximum speed: 40 km/h (25 mph)
Career
- Operators: NZGR, New Zealand Railways Corporation
- Numbers: Road numbers: 216 - 276
- First run: December 1953
- Disposition: Withdrawn from 1980 onwards

The New Zealand DSA class locomotive (Note: Following the introduction of Traffic Monitoring System (TMS) in 1979, the class classification was capitalised, whereas previously the second letter was a smaller capital letter, that is D^{SA}) is a type of 0-6-0DM diesel-mechanical locomotives built by three different manufacturers: W. G. Bagnall, Hunslet, Mitsubishi Heavy Industries, and Vulcan Foundry for the Drewry Car Co. They were built between 1953 and 1967.

== Introduction ==
Following on from the success of the initial batch of D^{S} class 0-6-0DM shunting locomotives, NZR management decided to acquire further locomotives of this type. These locomotives would be similar to the D^{S} class and would be allocated to the major centres where they would be used primarily as shunting locomotives. As they would be slightly heavier these locomotives were allocated the D^{SA} classification.

The first batch of seven D^{SA} class locomotives arrived in 1953 from the Drewry Car Company, with another fourteen coming from that maker the following year. NZR also placed orders in 1954 with W. G. Bagnall and Hunslet for a further ten and fifteen locomotives respectively, which were delivered in 1956-57 by Bagnall and 1954-58 by Hunslet. No further D^{SA}s were purchased until NZR placed an order with Mitsubishi Heavy Engineering for a further ten locomotives in 1967, all of which were delivered later that year.

=== Drewry Car Company ===
Road numbers D^{SA} 216-235 (TMS DSA 209-401)
Maker's Nos. 2414/D163-2433/D182

Designated as model A-2, these locomotives were built by the Vulcan Foundry of English Electric for the Drewry Car Company. They weighed 29.5 tons ready for service and were powered by a Gardner 8L3 diesel engine producing 204 hp. The driving wheels were 39¾", the same size as that of the D^{S} class. All entered service between November 1953 and June 1954 and were based mostly in the North Island. Two locomotives, D^{SA}'s 218 and 234, were reallocated to the South Island and were noted in January 1977 as being based at Invercargill. D^{SA} 234 has been restored to running condition and is operated by Oamaru Steam and Rail in North Otago.

Visually, the Drewry D^{SA} was very similar to the earlier D^{S} class, although the upper half of the cab tapered inwards as opposed to the straight-sided cab of the D^{S}. Most retained their original red livery to the end of their service with NZR although two, DSA265 (pre-TMS D^{SA} 221) and DSA401 (pre-TMS D^{SA} 235) did receive the International Orange livery at NZR Otahuhu Workshops in 1982 and 1983 respectively.

=== W. G. Bagnall ===
Road numbers D^{SA} 240-249 (TMS DSA 414-510)
Maker's Nos. 3079-3088

These ten locomotives were standard Bagnall 0-6-0DM shunting locomotives, similar to those supplied to Tasman Pulp and Paper in 1954 (one locomotive) and Wilsons Portland Cement in 1958 (two locomotives). They weighed 30.6 long tons (34.3 short tons; 31.1 t) ready for service, and were originally powered by a National M4AA6 diesel engine producing 240 hp (180 kW) connected to a Vulcan-Sinclair fluid coupling and Wilson five-speed epicyclic gearbox. They had 39 3/4 in (1,010 mm) wheels and a top speed of 52 km/h (32 mph) as built, later reduced to 39 km/h (24 mph) after re-powering. All were exclusively based in the North Island, and in 1977 it was noted that D^{SA}'s 240-247 were based in Wellington while D^{SA}'s 248 and 249 were based at Palmerston North. Later, several migrated to Gisborne where they finished their NZR service.

Due to issues with the M4AA6 engine, NZR decided to refit the locomotives in 1968 with more reliable 315 hp (235 kW) Caterpillar D343T diesel engines and Twin Disc torque converters. This resulted in the cosmetic appearance of the locomotive changing with a new housing mounted on the left-hand side running board to protect the torque converter while several hood panels were fitted with large mesh sections to improve cross-ventilation.

Most of the locomotives were eventually repainted into the International Orange livery. One notable variant of this was DSA 470 (pre-TMS D^{SA} 245) after it was involved in an accident which destroyed the original hood-front. A new one was fabricated from sheet metal, giving 470 a more austere look with its flat-faced hood. This locomotive spent its last years working out of Gisborne and was withdrawn in April 1990.

=== Hunslet Engine Company ===
Road numbers D^{SA} 250-264 (TMS DSA 523-510)
Maker's N^{O}s. 4528-4537, 4697-4701

These fifteen locomotives were standard Hunslet 0-6-0DM diesel shunting locomotives, similar to the British Rail Class 2/8 and 2/9 class shunting locomotives. They weighed 30.5 long tons (34.2 short tons; 31.0 t) ready for service and had 39 3/4 in (1,010 mm) wheels. The initial batch of ten locomotives were fitted with National M4AA6 diesel engines developing a slightly higher 250 hp powering a Hunslet friction clutch and four-speed gearbox but this gave trouble and the last batch were fitted with hydraulic transmissions, again powered by the 250 hp M4AA6.

All of the Hunslet locomotives were based exclusively in the South Island and came in three batches - the first in 1954-55 (D^{SA}'s 250-254, 257), the second in 1956 (D^{SA}'s 255, 258) and the third and final batch in 1957-58 (D^{SA}'s 256, 257, 259-264). At an early stage five were repowered with 204 hp Gardner 8L3 diesel engines but all were eventually repowered with 315 hp Caterpillar D343T engines.

=== Mitsubishi Heavy Engineering ===
Road numbers D^{SA} 265-276 (TMS DSA 699-822)
Maker's N^{O}'s. 1460-1471

These eleven locomotives were the last D^{SA} class locomotives to enter service and the most modern. They weighed 38.1 tons ready for service and had 39¾" wheels. All were fitted with 315 hp Caterpillar D343T diesel engines with Twin Disc torque converters. All were exclusively confined to the South Island pre-1991. The class was regularly allocated to Timaru and at least three locomotives of this type were allocated there in the 1980s.

== Withdrawal and preservation ==
With the rationalisation of New Zealand Railways Corporation in the 1980s, the need for the DSA class was reduced, with the first locomotives of this class being withdrawn early in this decade. The entire class was withdrawn by 1990 with the exception of two locomotives; Hunslet DSA551 (D^{SA} 253) which was owned by New Zealand Railways but used as the shunting locomotive for the Kingston Flyer at Kingston, and Mitsubishi DSA782 (D^{SA} 273) which had been overhauled and moved to Poverty Bay for use at Wairoa as a shunting locomotive.

Due to the number of D^{SA} class locomotives and their higher power rating, these locomotives were purchased in large numbers by industrial users. A smaller number of locomotives were purchased directly from New Zealand Railways as they were withdrawn.

== Return to service ==
In the 1990s, New Zealand Rail Limited and its successor Tranz Rail took two DSA class locomotives back into their stock list - Hunslet DSA551 (D^{SA} 253) and Mitsubishi DSA782 (D^{SA} 273).

In 1991, DSA782 was returned from loan to Rail Base Systems after the conclusion of track recovery beyond Middlemarch on the Otago Central Railway. Although obsolete, the DSA was overhauled and dispatched to Wairoa on the Palmerston North-Gisborne Line for use as a shunting locomotive in 1995. It retained its "International Orange" livery but with Frutiger-script numbers on the cab. The locomotive was later on-sold to the Northland Dairy Company and used to shunt their plant at Kauri.

In 1999, former Kingston Flyer shunting locomotive DSA551 was replaced by a TR class locomotive. The DSA was then trucked to Dunedin and overhauled at Hillside Workshops, during which time it was repainted in a variant of the Tranz Rail "Cato Blue" livery. It was returned to service in 2001, before moving to Awatoto in 2003 to replace Mainline Steam-owned D^{SA} 258 (DSA617) at Ravensdown Fertiliser Awatoto. The locomotive was later sold to Ravensdown for use as their plant shunter. In 2014 the locomotive was sold to Goldfields Railway in Waihi.
