= List of preserved Avonside locomotives =

This page is a list of the preserved Avonside locomotives

== List ==
Identity	Other number(s)	Railway(s)	Works number	Built	Wheel arrangement	Gauge	Country	Location	Notes	Image
TRA 9	Class 7		835	1871	2-4-0T	3 ft 6 in (1,067 mm)	Taiwan	Taipei New Park	Built for Japanese railways' inauguration in 1872, subsequently sold to Taiwan.	
3		Estrada de Ferro Sorocabana	Unknown	1875	4-4-0T	1,000 mm (3 ft 3 3/8 in)	Brazil	Bebedouro, São Paulo		
H.199		NZGR	1075	1875	0-4-2T	3 ft 6 in (1,067 mm)	New Zealand	Fell Locomotive Museum	Built for the Fell-equipped Rimutaka Incline.	
NKlJ No. 5		Nordmark-Klarälvens Järnväg	1114	1875	0-6-2T	891 mm (2 ft 11 3/32 in)	Sweden	Hagfors Station		
L.207		NZGR	1205	1877	2-4-0T	3 ft 6 in (1,067 mm)	New Zealand	Museum of Transport and Technology, Auckland		
L.508	L.208	NZGR and others	1206	1877	2-4-0T	3 ft 6 in (1,067 mm)	New Zealand	Shantytown, New Zealand		
L.509	L30, L21, L.219	NZGR, Public Works Department, Wilsons Portland Cement Company	1207	1877	2-4-0T	3 ft 6 in (1,067 mm)	New Zealand	Silver Stream Railway		
R28		NZGR, Timaru Harbour Board, State Mines Department	1217	1878	0-6-4T	3 ft 6 in (1,067 mm)	New Zealand	Reefton	Single Fairlie	
23		Estrada de Ferro Sorocabana	1294	1878	4-4-0T	1,000 mm (3 ft 3 3/8 in)	Brazil	Paraguaçu Paulista, São Paulo		
GWR No. 1340 TROJAN		Alexandra Docks, GWR and others	1386	1897	0-4-0ST	1,435 mm (4 ft 8 1/2 in)	United Kingdom	Didcot Railway Centre		
SMR No.2	J & A Brown No.27	South Maitland Railways	1415	1900	0-4-0ST	1,435 mm (4 ft 8 1/2 in)	Australia	Dorrigo Steam Railway & Museum		
KATHLEEN		John Lysaght and Co.	1862	1921	0-4-0ST	1,435 mm (4 ft 8 1/2 in)	Australia	Richmond Vale Railway Museum		
No. 2 PONTYBEREM		Burry Port and Gwendraeth Valley Railway	1421	1900	0-6-0ST	1,435 mm (4 ft 8 1/2 in)	United Kingdom	Pontypool and Blaenavon Railway		
No. 4		Esperanza Estate	1422	1900	0-4-0T	2 ft (610 mm)	South Africa	Maydon Wharf Sugar Terminal		
No. 3		Puerto Iquique	1452	1902	0-6-0ST	Unknown	Chile			
No. 1		Dehri-Rohtas Light Railway	1457	1902	0-6-2T	2 ft 6 in (762 mm)	India	Dehri-Rohtas Light Railway		
No. 2		Dehri-Rohtas Light Railway	1458	1902	0-6-2T	2 ft 6 in (762 mm)	India	Dehri-Rohtas Light Railway		
MD&HB No. 1		Mersey Docks and Harbour Board	1465	1904	0-6-0ST	1,435 mm (4 ft 8 1/2 in)	United Kingdom	National Museums Liverpool		
DESMOND		Orb Steelworks	1498	1906	0-4-0ST	1,435 mm (4 ft 8 1/2 in)	United Kingdom	Llangollen Railway		
NANCY			1547	1908	0-6-0T	3 ft (914 mm)	Ireland	Cavan & Leitrim Railway, Dromod		
SMR No.14		South Maitland Railways	1559	1908	0-8-2T	1,435 mm (4 ft 8 1/2 in)	Australia	Dorrigo Steam Railway & Museum		
MILLOM		Partridge, Jones and John Paton Ltd; Hodbarrow Mining Company	1563	1908	0-4-0ST	1,435 mm (4 ft 8 1/2 in)	United Kingdom	Foxfield Railway		
LUCY		Hutchinson Estate & Dock Co. Ltd	1568	1909	0-6-0ST	1,435 mm (4 ft 8 1/2 in)	United Kingdom	Ribble Steam Railway		
WOOLMER	WD 74	Longmoor Military Railway	1572	1910	0-6-0ST	1,435 mm (4 ft 8 1/2 in)	United Kingdom	Milestones Living History Museum	Part of UK National Collection	
			1592	1910	Unknown	Unknown	Argentina	Rio Gallegos		
		Cronton Colliery	1600	1912	0-6-0ST	1,435 mm (4 ft 8 1/2 in)	United Kingdom	J. Doyle Ltd, Westhoughton; 53.5509°N 2.4944°W		
		Darnall Estate	1624	1913	Unknown	2 ft (610 mm)	South Africa	SANRASM, Chamdor		
	No. 9	Darnall Estate	1660	1913	0-4-0T	2 ft (610 mm)	South Africa	Tongaat-Hulett Sugar Ltd		
SIR JOHN		Mountain Ash Colliery	1680	1914	0-6-0ST	1,435 mm (4 ft 8 1/2 in)	United Kingdom	Pontypool and Blaenavon Railway		
SEZELA No. 1		Sezela Sugar Estates	1719	1915	0-4-0T	2 ft (610 mm)	South Africa	Illovo Sugar Estates		
SEZELA No. 2		Sezela Sugar Estates	1720	1915	0-4-0T	2 ft (610 mm)	United Kingdom	Nick Williams (private collection)		
SEZELA No. 4		Sezela Sugar Estates	1738	1915	0-4-0T	2 ft (610 mm)	United Kingdom	Leighton Buzzard Narrow Gauge Railway		
No. 1		Royal Arsenal Railway, Woolwich	1748	1916	0-4-0T	18 in (457 mm)	United Kingdom	Statfold Barn Railway		
34 PORTBURY		Inland Waterways and Docks	1764	1917	0-6-0ST	1,435 mm (4 ft 8 1/2 in)	United Kingdom	Bristol Harbour Railway		
ASKHAM HALL	15	NCB Whitehaven Colliery	1772	1917	0-4-0ST	1,435 mm (4 ft 8 1/2 in)	United Kingdom	Threlkeld Quarry and Mining Museum		
EDWIN HULSE	No 2	Imperial Smelting Works	1798	1918	0-6-0ST	1,435 mm (4 ft 8 1/2 in)	United Kingdom	Avon Valley Railway		
MD&HB 26		Mersey Docks and Harbour Board	1810	1918	0-6-0ST	1,435 mm (4 ft 8 1/2 in)	United Kingdom	Ribble Steam Railway		
No. 5		Dehri-Rohtas Light Railway	1856	1920	0-6-2T	2 ft 6 in (762 mm)	India	Dehri-Rohtas Light Railway		
		Hulett & Son	1857	1920	Unknown	2 ft (610 mm)	South Africa	Witbank, Eastern Cape		
		Chakas Kraal Sugar	1858	1920	0-4-0T	2 ft (610 mm)	South Africa	Tiny Toots School, Witbank, Eastern Cape		
		Soc. T. Fuego	1861	1920	0-6-0T	1,000 mm (3 ft 3 3/8 in)	Chile	Puerto Natales		
ELIZABETH		Southeastern Gas Board, Croydon	1865	1922	0-4-0ST	1,435 mm (4 ft 8 1/2 in)	United Kingdom	The Old Station, Rippingale, Lincolnshire (private residence, no public access but can be seen from road); 52.839920°N 0.345930°W		
MATUNGA, later ISOBEL, finally BARRINGTON		Bombay Harbour Improvement Trust, later to Totternhoe Quarries, finally to Barrington Cement Works	1875	1921	0-4-0ST	1,435 mm (4 ft 8 1/2 in)	United Kingdom	Rutland Railway Museum		
JOAN		Haunchwood Colliery; Arley Colliery	1883	1922	0-6-0ST	1,435 mm (4 ft 8 1/2 in)	United Kingdom	Ribble Steam Railway		
		DeJagersEstate	1887	1916	0-4-0T	2 ft (610 mm)	South Africa	Tongaat-Hulett Sugar Ltd		
FRED	SCM RS16	Buxton Quarry	1908	1925	0-4-0ST	1,435 mm (4 ft 8 1/2 in)	Belgium	Stoomcentrum Maldegem		
		Farleigh Sugar Mill, Queensland	1909	1922	0-4-0T	610 mm (2 ft)	United Kingdom	Bala Lake Railway		
			1913	1923	0-4-0DH rebuilt from 0-4-0ST by ICI	1,435 mm (4 ft 8 1/2 in)	United Kingdom	National Stone Centre		
EARL FITZWILLIAM		Pitsford Ironstone Quarries	1917	1923	0-6-0ST	1,435 mm (4 ft 8 1/2 in)	United Kingdom	Elsecar Heritage Railway		
CRANFORD	"No.3 Avonside"	Staveley Coal and Iron Company	1919	1924	0-6-0ST	1,435 mm (4 ft 8 1/2 in)	United Kingdom	Appleby Frodingham Railway Preservation Society		
SEZELA No. 6		Sezela Sugar Mill	1928	1923	0-4-0T	2 ft (610 mm)	United Kingdom	Nick Williams (private collection)		
		British Sugar Corporation	1945	1926	0-6-0ST	1,435 mm (4 ft 8 1/2 in)	United Kingdom	Elsecar Heritage Railway	Scrapped after donating spares to 1917	
ST THOMAS		NCB Snowdown Colliery	1971	1927	0-6-0ST	1,435 mm (4 ft 8 1/2 in)	United Kingdom	Dover Transport Museum		
STAMFORD	No 24	Staveley Coal and Iron Company	1972	1927	0-6-0ST	1,435 mm (4 ft 8 1/2 in)	United Kingdom	The Old Station, Rippingale, Lincolnshire (private residence, no public access)		
RRM 3 DORA	Barton No. 2	CEGB	1973	1927	0-4-0ST	1,435 mm (4 ft 8 1/2 in)	United Kingdom	Long term restoration, The Old Station, Rippingale, Lincolnshire (private residence, no public access)		
Cadbury No. 1		Bournville Works Railway	1977	1925	0-4-0T	1,435 mm (4 ft 8 1/2 in)	United Kingdom	Tyseley Locomotive Works		
No. 6		Dehri-Rohtas Light Railway	1982	1926	0-6-4T	2 ft 6 in (762 mm)	India	Dehri-Rohtas Light Railway		
RENISHAW No. 2		Crookes Bros, Renishaw Sugar Estate, South Africa	1986	1926	0-4-0T	2 ft (610 mm)	United Kingdom	Apedale Valley Light Railway		
		Tongaat Sugar	1994	1928	0-4-0T	2 ft (610 mm)	South Africa	Sandstone Steam Railroad		
ST DUNSTAN		Snowdown Collier	2004	1927	0-6-0ST	1,435 mm (4 ft 8 1/2 in)	United Kingdom	East Kent Railway		
LORD CAMROSE		Powell Duffryn Steam Coal Co.	2008	1930	0-6-0ST	1,435 mm (4 ft 8 1/2 in)	United Kingdom	Scrapped at Vale of Neath Railway Society 1990		
No. 3		Nepal Government Railway	2016	1928	0-6-2T	2 ft 6 in (762 mm)	Nepal	Janakpur Railway works		
No. 4		Hulett & Son	2018	1928	0-6-0T	2 ft (610 mm)	Swaziland	Swaziland Technical Institute		
No. 3 R.H.SMYTH		Londonderry Port & Harbour Commissioners	2021	1928	0-6-0ST	5 ft 3 in (1,600 mm)	Ireland	Railway Preservation Society of Ireland, Whitehead		
3		Myanma Railways	2026	1929	0-6-0ST	1,000 mm (3 ft 3 3/8 in)	Myanmar	Myanma Railways		
Sezala 3		Sezela Estates	2035	1929	0-4-0T	2 ft (610 mm)	South Africa	(private collection)		
No. 8			2049	1930	2-8-0	1,000 mm (3 ft 3 3/8 in)	Bolivia			
RENISHAW 4	No. 5		2057	1931	0-4-4-0T	600 mm (1 ft 11 5/8 in)	United Kingdom	Peter Rampton, private collection		
UVE 2			2065	1933	0-4-2T	2 ft (610 mm)	South Africa	Midmar Steam Railway		
OGWEN		Penrhyn Quarry	2066	1933	0-4-0T	1 ft 10 3/4 in (578 mm)	United Kingdom	Statfold Barn Railway		
MARCHLYN		Penrhyn Quarry	2067	1933	0-4-0T	1 ft 10 3/4 in (578 mm)	United Kingdom	Statfold Barn Railway	Not listed by IRS	
ROBERT		Lamport Ironstone mines railway Beckton Gasworks	2068	1933	0-6-0ST	1,435 mm (4 ft 8 1/2 in)	United Kingdom	Stratford station		
ELIDIR		Dinorwic Quarry	2071	1933	0-4-0T	1 ft 10 3/4 in (578 mm)	United Kingdom	Leighton Buzzard Narrow Gauge Railway		
