= Rimutaka Incline railway accidents =

Two railway incidents in New Zealand

Coordinates: 41.125659°S 175.210304°E

Rimutaka Incline Railway Accidents

Details
- Date: 11 September 1880
- Location: Rimutaka Incline, Rimutaka Ranges
- Country: New Zealand
- Line: Wairarapa Line
- Operator: New Zealand Railways Department
- Incident type: Derailment
- Cause: Extreme wind gusts

Statistics
- Trains: 1
- Deaths: 4

The Rimutaka incline railway line has had several accidents as the result of strong cross winds. On two occasions passenger trains were derailed by them. The first in 1880 resulting in four deaths, and the second in 1936 resulting in only injuries.

== 1880 Fell Engine accident ==
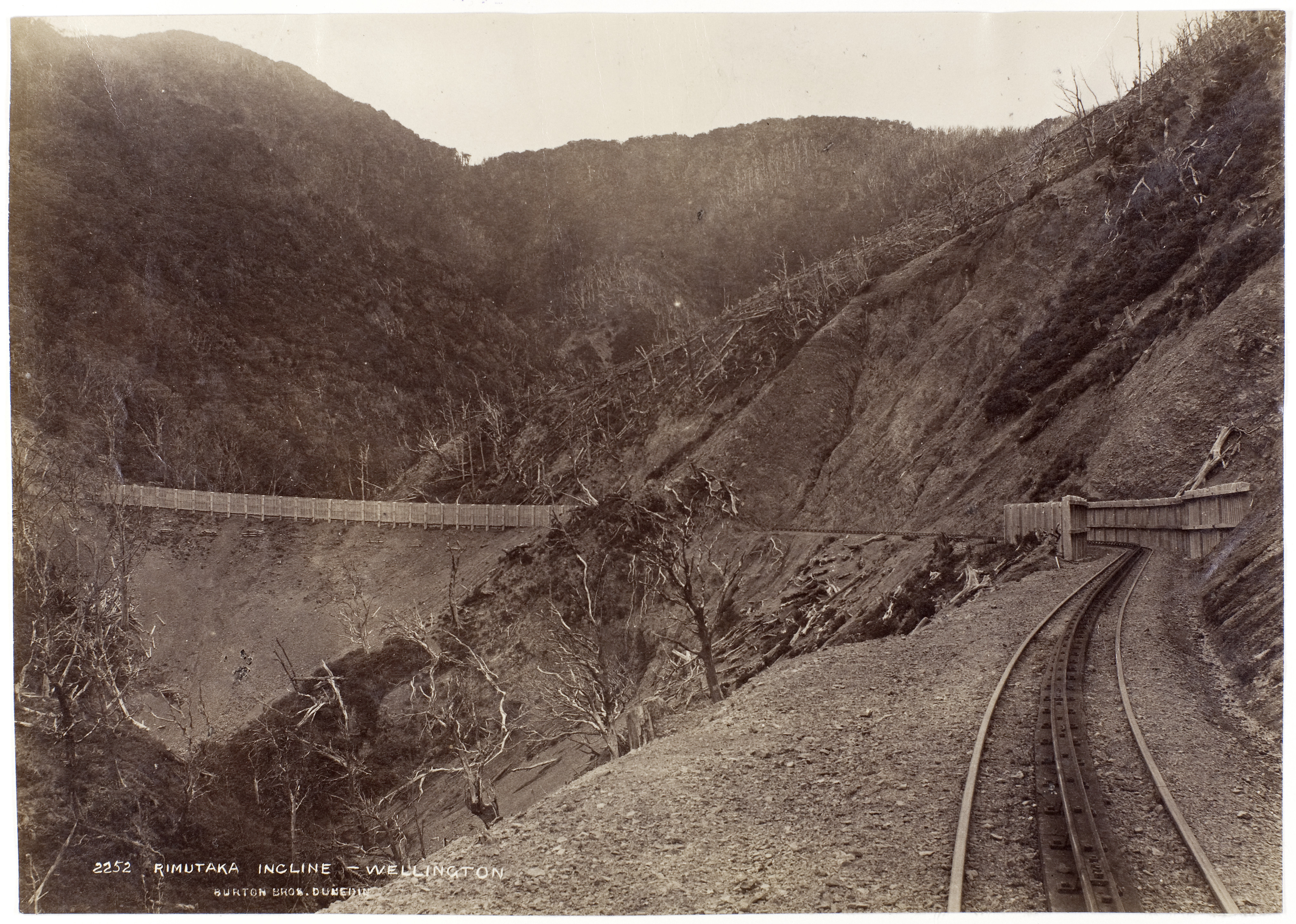
Siberia bend

The first accident occurred on 11 September 1880 when the leading three carriages on a Greytown to Wellington train were blown off the track in strong winds near the Siberia tunnel; killing four passengers. The Rimutaka Incline section of the line over the Rimutaka Ranges between Wellington and the Wairarapa used the Fell system on the steep 1 in 15 section which was 4.8 km (3.0 mi) long.

A small train left Greytown at 8.30am bound for Wellington. At Cross Creek, at the foot of the Rimutaka Ranges, an NZR H class Fell locomotive, H201, was added to the train to push it up the steep 1 in 15 ascent to the summit of the Rimutaka Incline. At Cross Creek the two passenger cars and the luggage carriage were put in front of the engine. Then behind this were two wagons of timber and lastly the Fell brake van.

All went well until the train reached an area of the incline known as Siberia. A strong north-west wind was blowing across the track. A terrific gust hit the three leading carriages, which were blown off the railway line. The body of the first carriage was torn from its mountings and the passengers were thrown onto the hillside, although the couplings held. The weight of the engine prevented the carriages from falling into the valley below, and the grip of the engine on the raised centre-rail saved the whole train from destruction and more loss of life. The engine and brake van also had brakes which gripped the raised centre rail. The rear brakesman uncoupled his van and piloted the van down the incline to Cross Creek to get help.

Three children were killed instantly and there were many injuries, some horrific. One of the injured, Stanley George Nicholas aged 5 years, died later from injuries received. The inquest found that the deaths were accidental, caused by the carriages being blown off the line, and no blame was attached to anyone. Action was urged to erect windshelters on dangerous parts of the incline, and this was done. When the wind was fierce, two engines were used on the incline.

== 1936 RM class Railcar accident ==
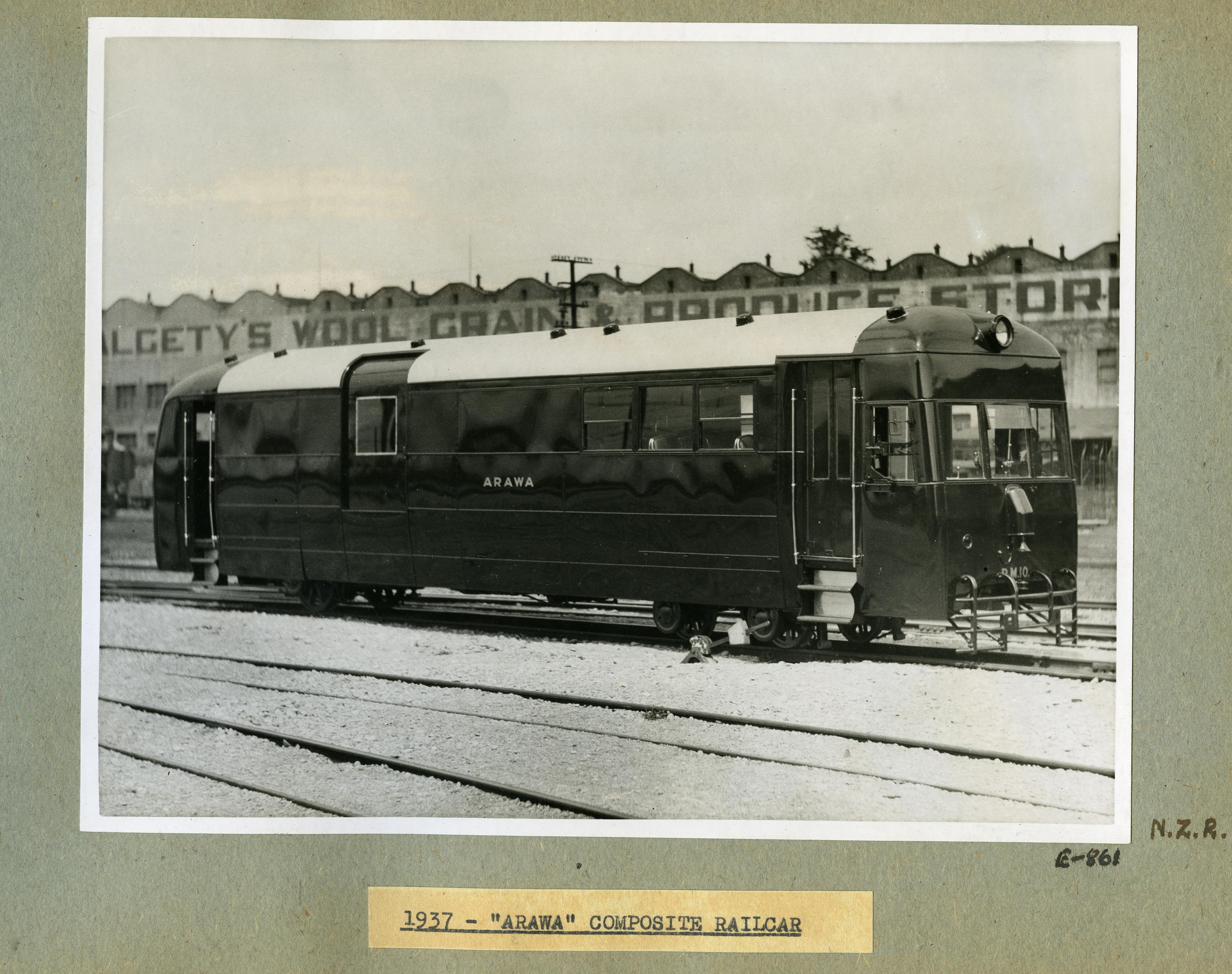
RM class Railcar

On 8 October 1936 a 16-ton railcar (RM6 Mamari) travelling south on the Wairarapa line was blown off the track by a gust estimated at 128 km/h (80 mph). Eight of the 24 passengers, seven of whom were women, were injured. The accident happened between Featherston and Pigeon Bush, just before a large wooden windbreak. The railcar was able to be returned to the track and eventually repaired.

== See also ==
- List of wind-related railway accidents
