= Pigeon Bush railway station =

Defunct railway station in New Zealand

Pigeon Bush
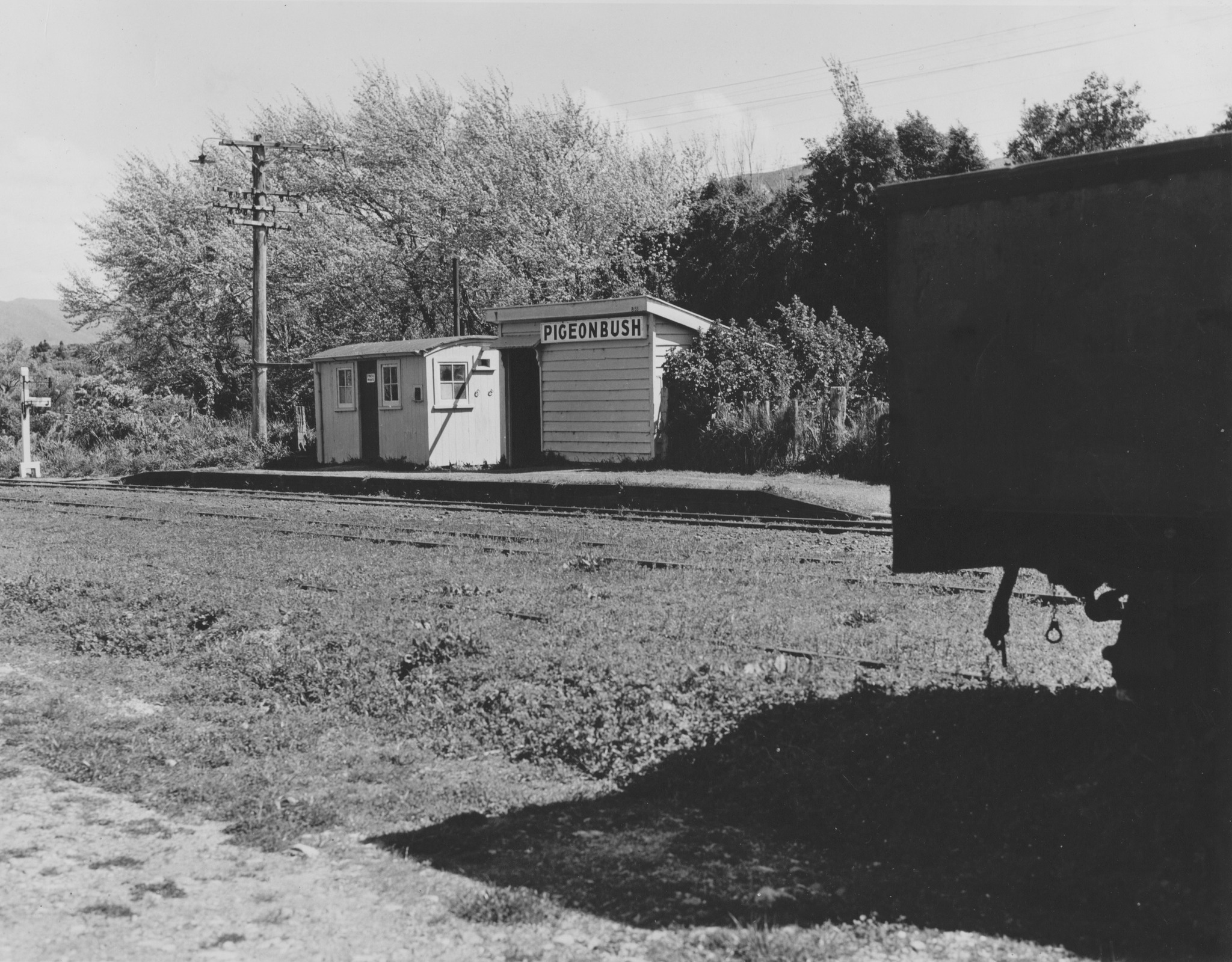
- Pigeon Bush railway station 1 January 1950

General information
- Location: Featherston Cross Creek Road, South Wairarapa
- Coordinates: 41°9′7.69″S 175°16′12.63″E
- System: Formerly New Zealand Government Railways Department
- Owner: Formerly Railways Department; Now privately owned
- Line: Formerly part of Wairarapa Line
- Platforms: Single
- Tracks: Main line (1), crossing loop (1), siding (1)

History
- Opened: 12 October 1878
- Closed: 30 October 1955
- Former names: Lucena's
Location
Notes
- Previous Station: Cross Creek Station; Next Station: Featherston Station

Pigeon Bush railway station was a single platform, rural railway station in an area of the South Wairarapa district known as Pigeon Bush, about 6 kilometres (3.7 mi) south-west of Featherston, in New Zealand's North Island. The station was between Featherston and Cross Creek stations on the Wairarapa Line. The station was bypassed when the Rimutaka Tunnel was opened.

== History ==
During work on the Incline Contract for the Rimutaka Incline, land was taken just north-east of Lucena's Creek (known today as Owhanga Stream) for a road diversion around what was to become the yard for a station identified on plans as Lucena's. By the time the station was opened in 1878, its name had been changed to Pigeon Bush. It had a passenger platform and shelter shed, loading bank, portable sheep loading ramp, a loop siding and a crossing loop.

The chief traffic through this station was sheep, but its main purpose was to provide a crossing point for trains. H class Fell locomotives were used occasionally to bank trains from Pigeon Bush to Cross Creek until about 1943. The station was fully signalled in 1922.

As a result of the derailing of a mixed train that had just departed Pigeon Bush for Featherston on 19 January 1888 due to severe wind gusts, windbreak fences and rows of willow trees were erected along the length of line most prone to the wind. However, on 8 October 1936, the Wairarapa railcar Mamari was overturned by a strong wind gust just north of the Pigeon Bush windbreak, coming to rest on its side. There were no fatalities, but several of the passengers required hospital treatment in Featherston. This incident led to the extension of the windbreak fence during the following three months.

The station was closed on 30 October 1955 when the old line over the Rimutaka Ranges was closed while the Rimutaka Deviation was prepared for being opened to traffic. Once the old line and station facilities had been removed, the road reverted to its original course.

== Today ==
There are no obvious signs of the station remaining today, save for the road deviation which is still visible and now provides access to a neighbouring farm. The railway house that was on site and outlasted the station by several decades has been removed. The piles of the rail bridge south of the station that once crossed the Owhango Stream are still in situ.

== Future ==
The Rimutaka Incline Railway Heritage Trust aims to restore the original line over the Rimutaka Ranges from Maymorn. At this stage, they have made no firm plans regarding a line between Cross Creek and Featherston.

== Gallery ==
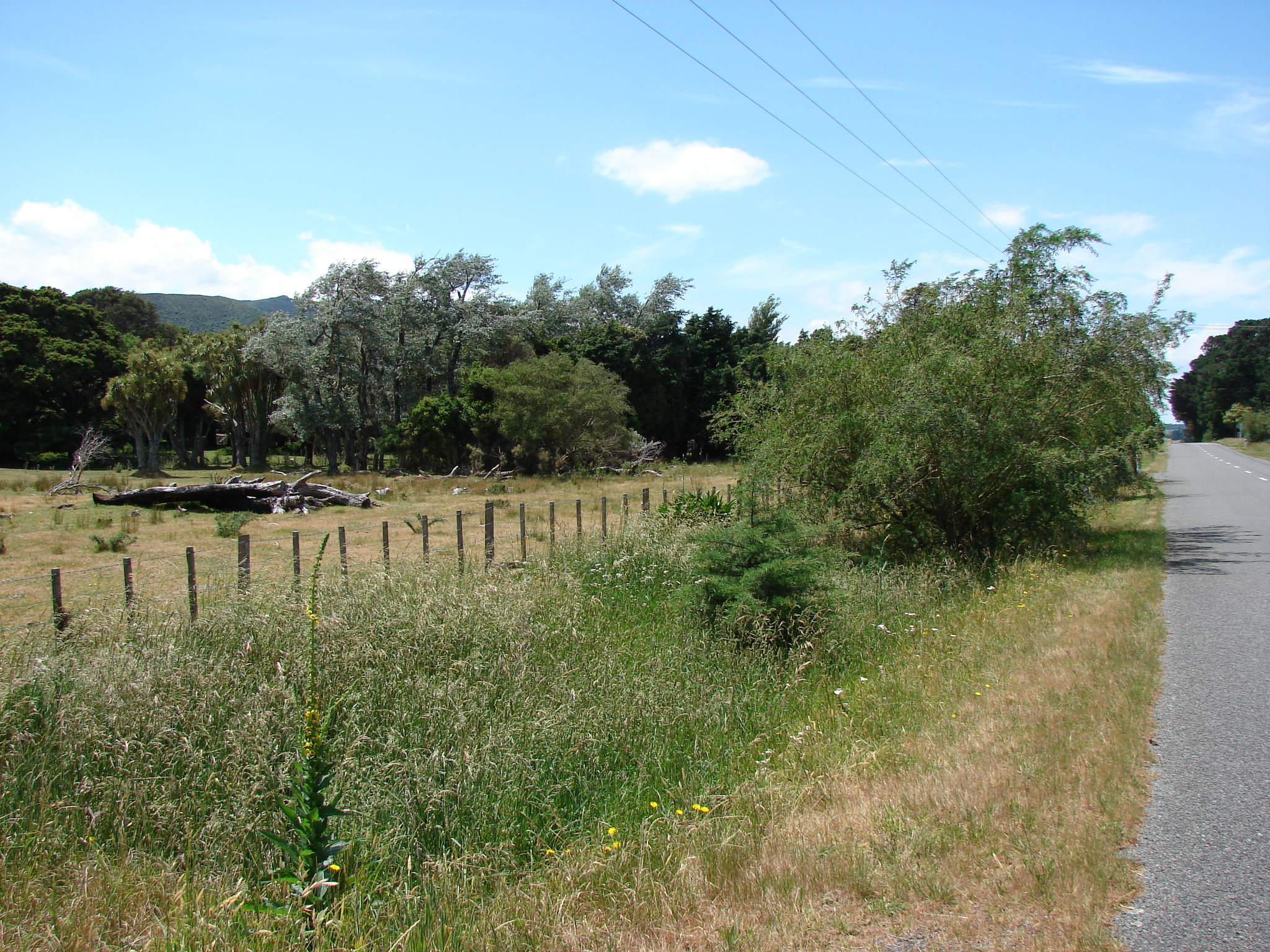
Southern end of the former Pigeon Bush station yard, looking north-east in the direction of Featherston in 2007.

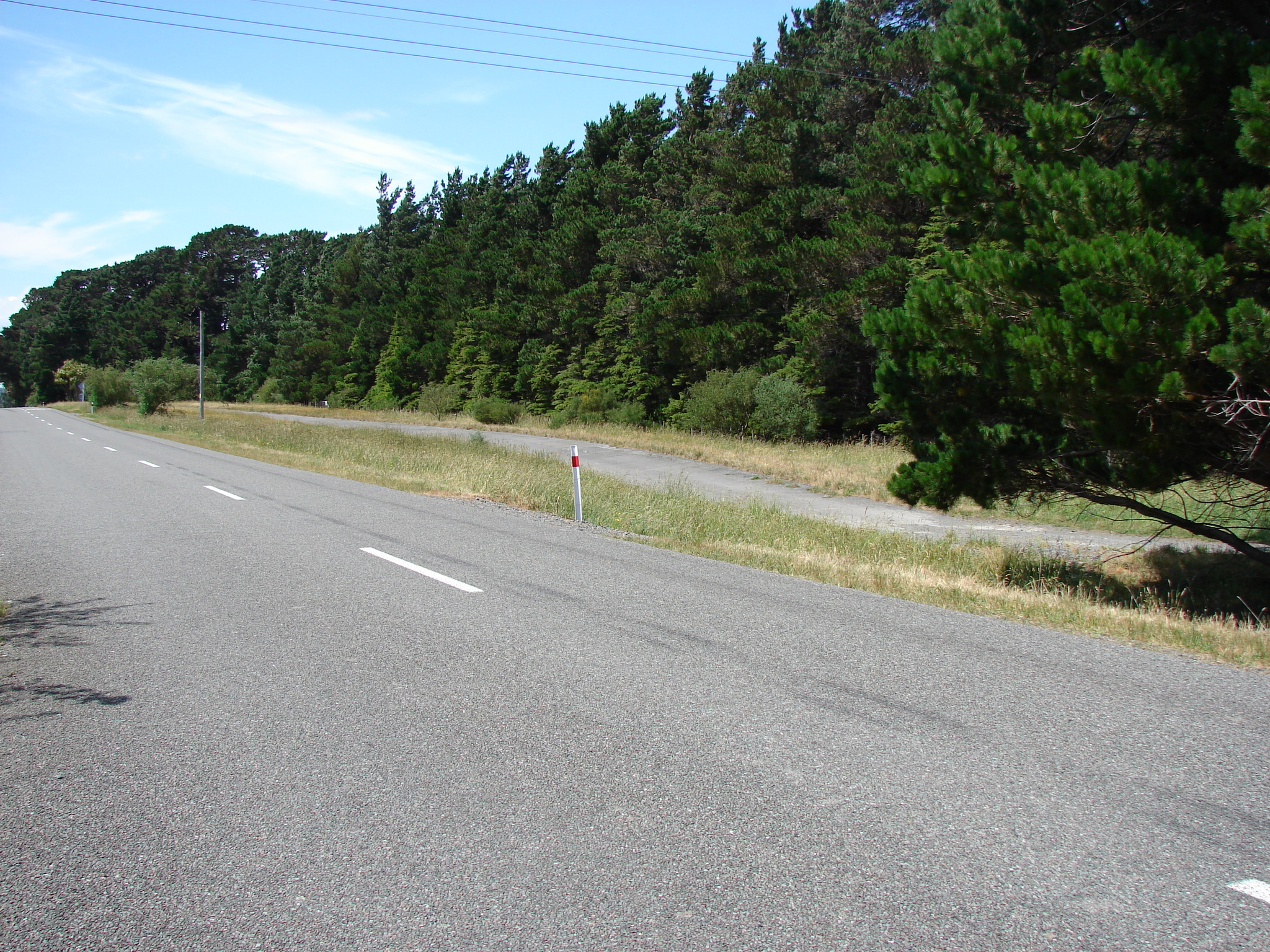
Western Lake Road and the former road deviation around the Pigeon Bush station yard.

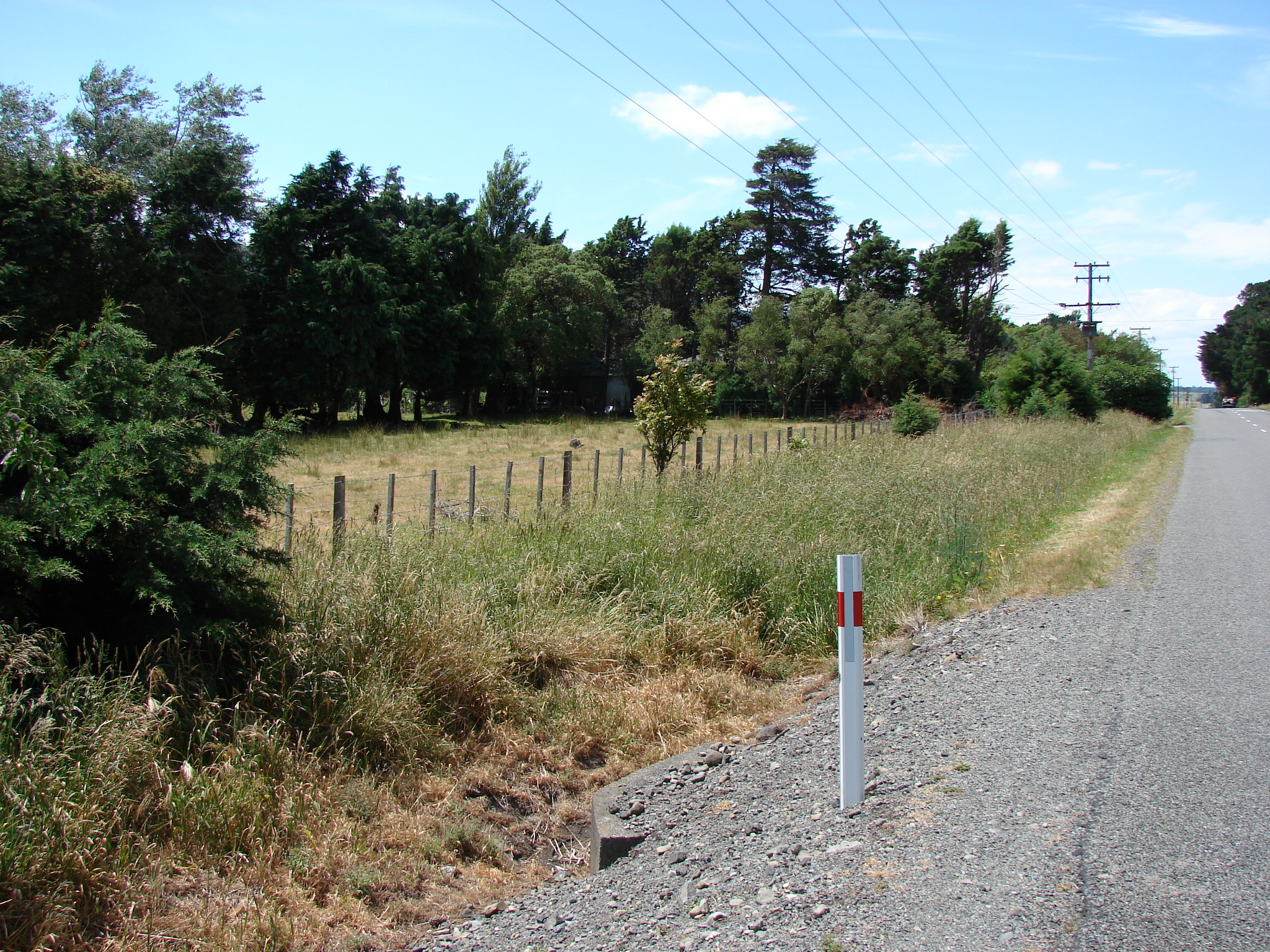
Northern end of the Pigeon Bush station yard, looking north-east in the direction of Featherston.

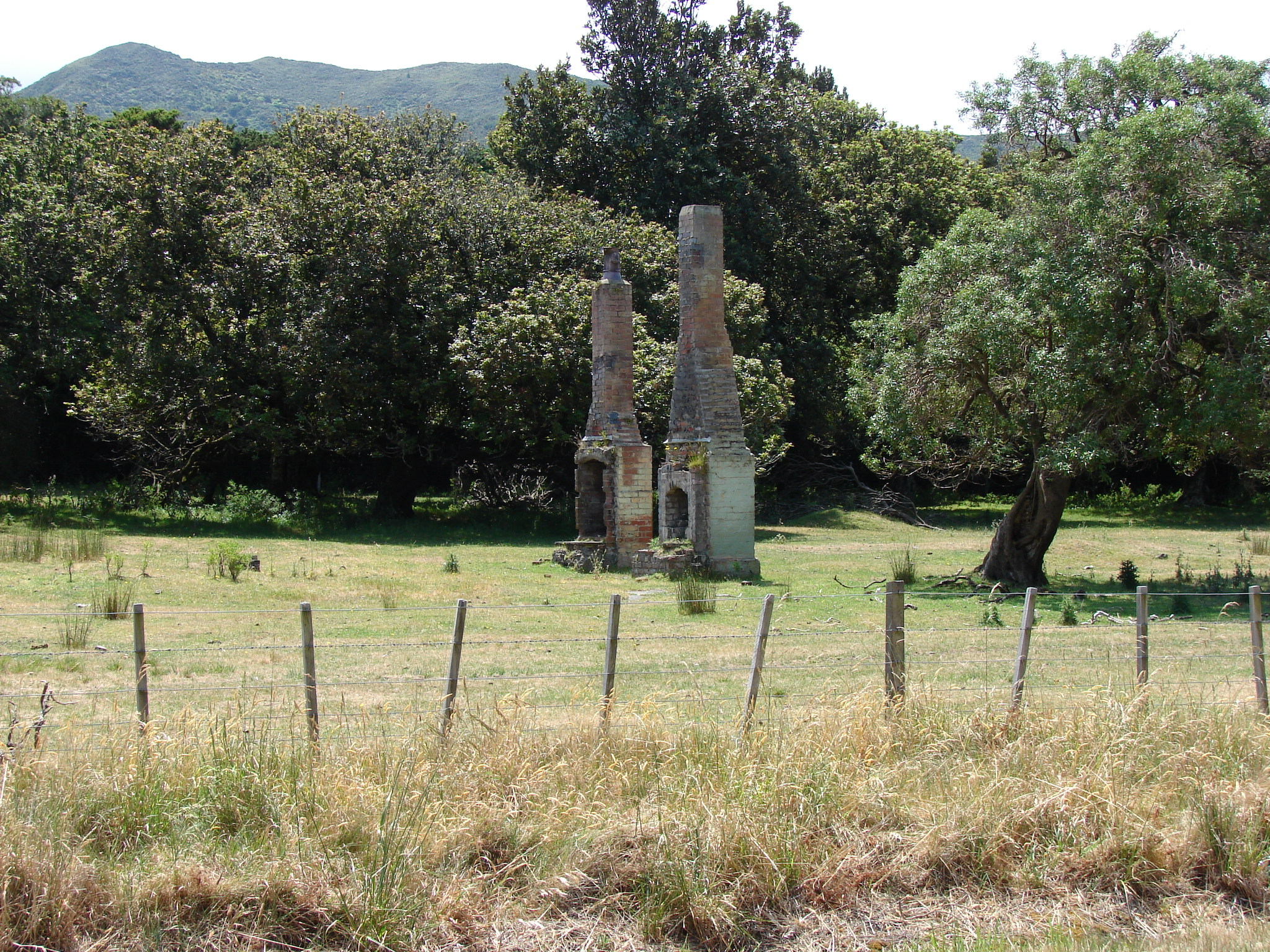
The remains of a building at the Pigeon Bush station site. Was one of four houses for railway staff.

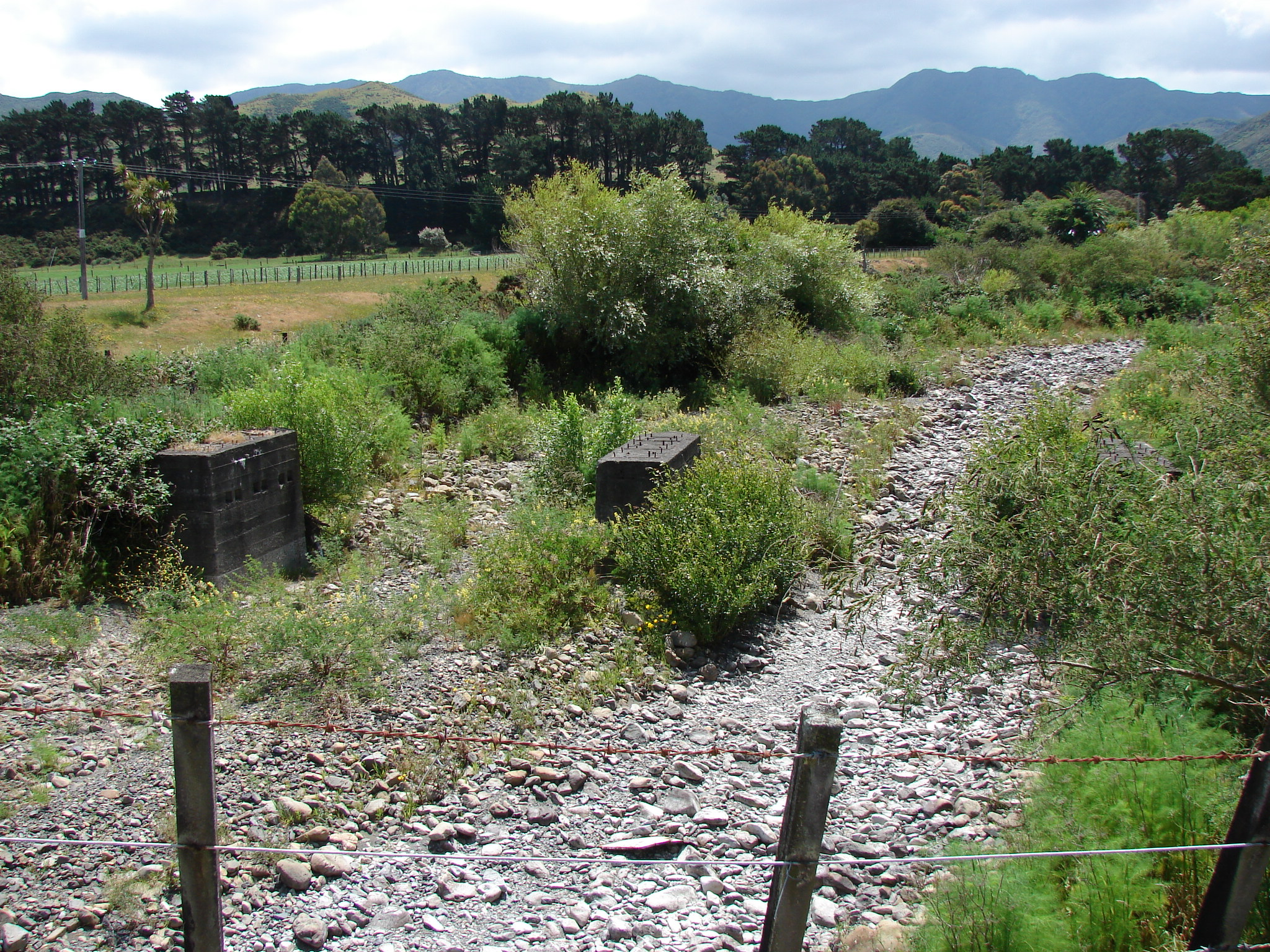
Remains of the rail bridge that used to cross the Owhango Stream, just south of the Pigeon Bush station yard.

== See also ==
- Rimutaka Incline
- Rimutaka Tunnel
- Rimutaka Incline Railway Heritage Trust
