= Rimutaka Incline =

Coordinates: 41°9′9.98″S 175°11′43.62″E

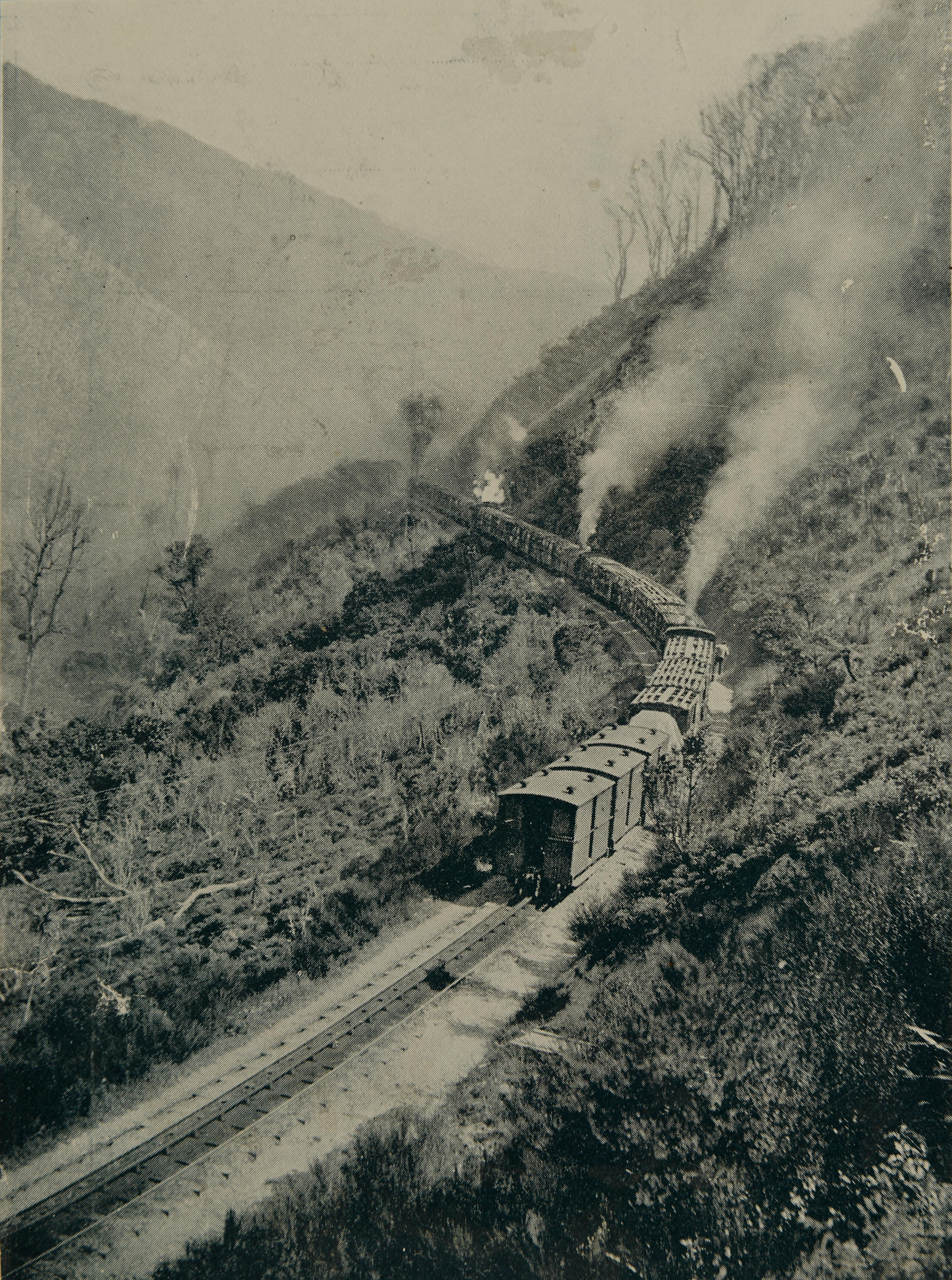
- Four engine load ascending Rimutaka Incline

Overview
- Status: Closed
- Owner: New Zealand Railways Department
- Locale: Wellington, New Zealand
- Termini: Cross Creek; Summit
- Stations: 2

Service
- System: New Zealand Government Railways (NZGR)
- Operator: New Zealand Railways Department
- Rolling stock: NZR H class (primary motive power)

History
- Opened: 16 October 1878
- Closed: 30 October 1955

Technical
- Line length: 3 mi (4.8 km)
- Track length: 3 mi (4.8 km)
- Num of tracks: Single
- Character: Rural
- Rack system: Fell (not a rack system)
- Track gauge: 3 ft 6 in (1,067 mm)
- Highest elevation: 1,141 feet (348 m)
- Maximum incline: 6.667%

Map

The Rimutaka Incline was a 3-mile-long (4.8 km), 3 ft 6 in (1,067 mm) gauge railway line on an average grade of 1-in-15 using the Fell system between Summit and Cross Creek stations on the Wairarapa side of the original Wairarapa Line in the Wairarapa district of New Zealand. The term "Rimutaka Incline" is sometimes used incorrectly to refer to other parts or all of the closed and deviated section of the Wairarapa Line between Upper Hutt and Speedy's Crossing, near Featherston. The incline formation is now part of the Remutaka Rail Trail.

== History ==
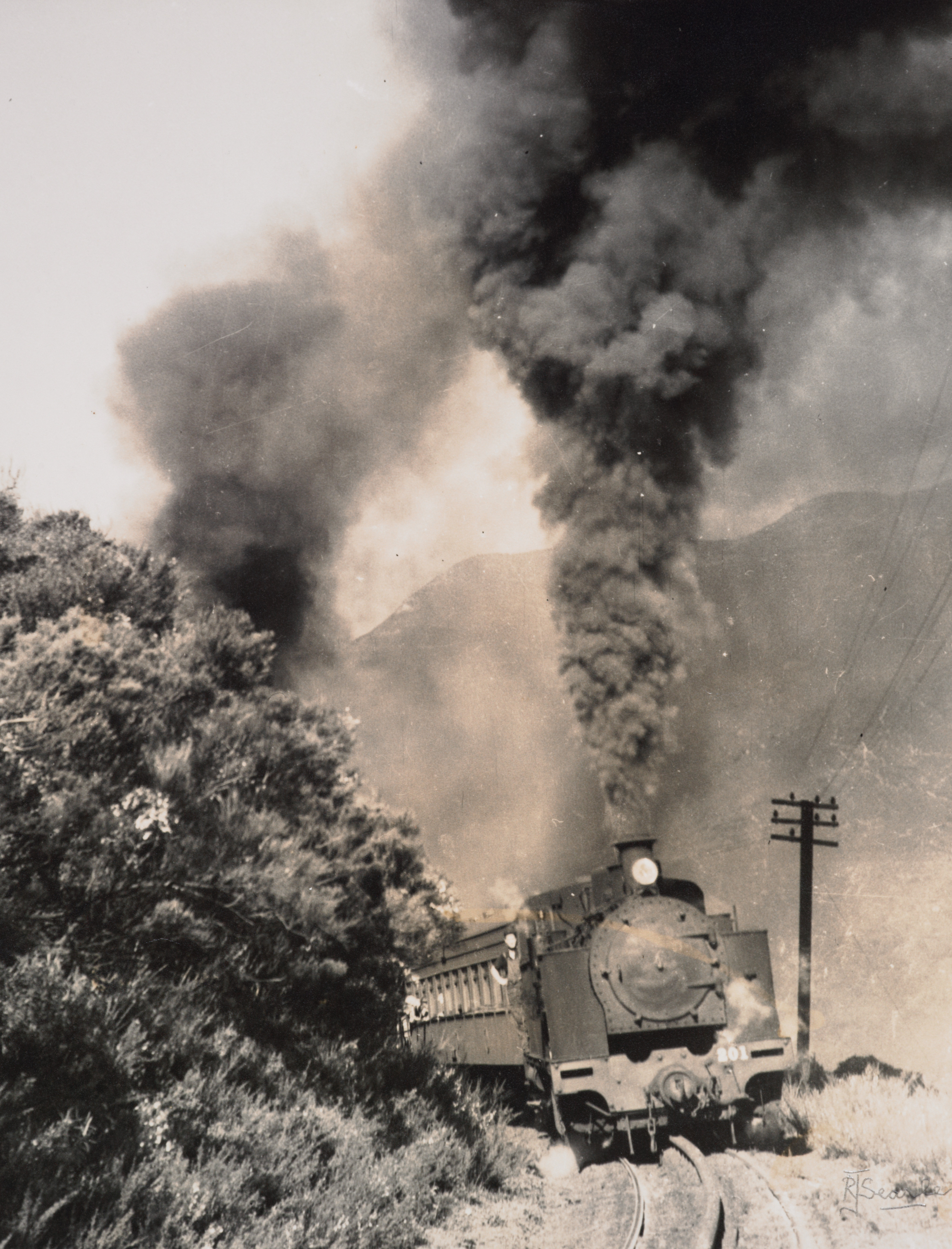
Passenger train at unknown date

=== Background ===
The construction of a railway from Wellington to Masterton was authorised in the Railways Act passed on 13 September 1871. Julius Vogel, Colonial Treasurer, travelled to England to raise finance for a major public works programme for railway construction. Vogel returned via the United States, where he studied rail systems.

After the act of Parliament was passed, a survey party set out to make preliminary investigations of possible routes for a railway over the Rimutaka Range (now spelled "Remutaka Range"). These were completed by December 1870, the party having investigated four routes. A commonality between all the proposals was the section from Upper Hutt to Kaitoki (later Kaitoke). etween Kaitoke and the Wairarapa, the four proposals were the Tauwharenikau Route, Sinclair's Route, a coastal route and the Pakuratahi Route.

While the government was conducting its surveys, Wellington Province Superintendent William Fitzherbert instructed his Provincial Engineer, Charles O’Neill, to investigate the possibility of a railway through the Rimutaka Valley (the route of the road between Featherston and Upper Hutt), with a tunnel through the dividing range. The survey was carried out between May and 21 July 1871, and O’Neill reported that a tunnel 130 chains (2.6 km) long would be required, with the line rising at 1 in 60 from the Pakuratahi to the tunnel then descending at 1 in 40 to Featherston. This survey was forwarded to the Minister for Public Works.

In mid-1873, the route to Featherston was chosen after a final survey for the route from Upper Hutt to Summit. For the line between Summit and the Wairarapa, several proposals were considered. The first, with gradients up to 1 in 30, was dismissed. It was found that to keep the gradient to no steeper than 1 in 40, curves of three chains (60 m) radius would be required. This would have required special rolling stock and heavy earthworks and was thus abandoned.

Another proposal was known as the Birch Spur Incline. This would have involved the line continuing from Summit to Birch Spur, from where a rope-worked incline would convey traffic to the valley floor, where the railway would continue through a narrow valley to the Wairarapa plains. The Public Works Department engineers investigating this proposal were unable to locate a suitable incline, so this proposal was also abandoned.

The last option was a three-mile (4.8 km) incline with gradients averaging 1 in 15 "to be worked by locomotives of an unusual nature". This line was the most favourable from an engineer's point of view, and required not unreasonable earthworks. The final decision was made by the head of the Public Works Department, John Carruthers. He determined that an incline worked by the Fell system would be suitable, and cited the Mont Cenis Pass Railway as an example. Though special locomotives would be required, factors in its favour were that ordinary rolling stock could be used and it was a proven system. It was to be the third and last Fell system employing the centre rail for both tractive power and braking, and the longest surviving. Though it was considered to be a "temporary" measure, it outlasted the second such system in Brazil by 72 years.

=== Construction ===
Construction of the Rimutaka Incline was included in two contracts that were let for the building of the original Wairarapa Line. These contracts were known as the Summit contract and the Incline contract.

==== Summit contract ====
This contract included the excavation of Summit station yard and related drainage, Summit tunnel, and formation work to a point 26 chains (523 m) beyond the tunnel. It was the shortest contract of those let for the line; it was finished by the original contractor, and it had the fewest alterations. Work was to start on 12 July 1874 and to be completed by 22 July 1876, at which time the Pakuratahi contract was due to be completed.

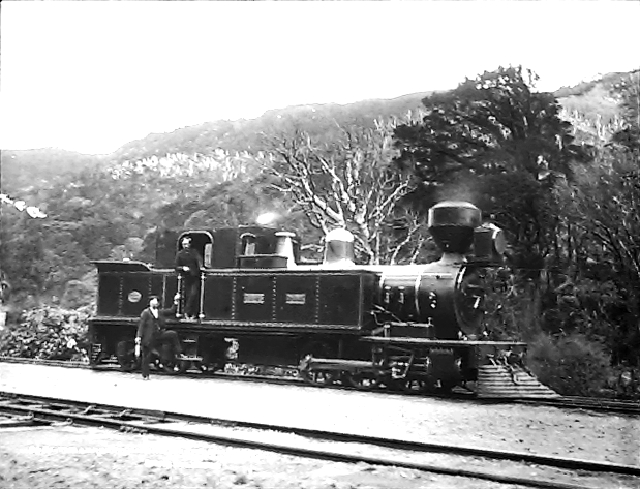
The largest engine on the Rimutaka, at the Summit

Summit yard was a large cut into the hillside, 120 feet (37 m) wide and 500 yards (460 m) long initially. Excavations removed material to a depth of 15–20 feet, with this fill being dumped on the opposite side of the yard to form level ground. On the hillside above the yard, further ground was levelled and houses erected thereon.

After the yard had taken shape, the next job was the tunnel. The approach to the tunnel was about 6 chains long and up to 60 feet (18 m) deep. The line entered the tunnel on a downward grade of 1 in 1,000, steepening to a grade of 1 in 15 at the eastern portal. At that end a small drainage tunnel had to be built to divert a stream that had flowed down a steep gully where the tunnel mouth was to be. The maximum height of the tunnel was 15 feet (4.6 m) above the floor: once rails were laid the maximum clearance was 13 feet 9 inches (4.19 m) The width of the tunnel varied from 10 feet 6 inches (3.20 m) at the floor to 12 feet (3.7 m) at 7 feet 6 inches (2.29 m) above the floor. Despite castigation from various parties, it was not until March 1877 that work on both ends of the tunnel met at the middle, having taken three and a half years to complete.

The Public Works Department lined the tunnel after the rails had reached the site, enabling them to use work trains to bring materials and other supplies in. It was during this phase that the only fatality on this contract occurred: on 3 May 1878, a sizeable portion of the lining collapsed on two men. One was killed outright; the other lost his eyesight due to severe head injuries.

The Summit contract was completed on 10 December 1877, 17 months behind schedule. The line to Kaitoke opened on 1 January 1878.

==== Incline contract ====
On 5 October 1875, the Incline contract was awarded to Charles McKirdy for the sum of £49,029. The contract covered formation only, with the Public Works Department responsible for laying the track.

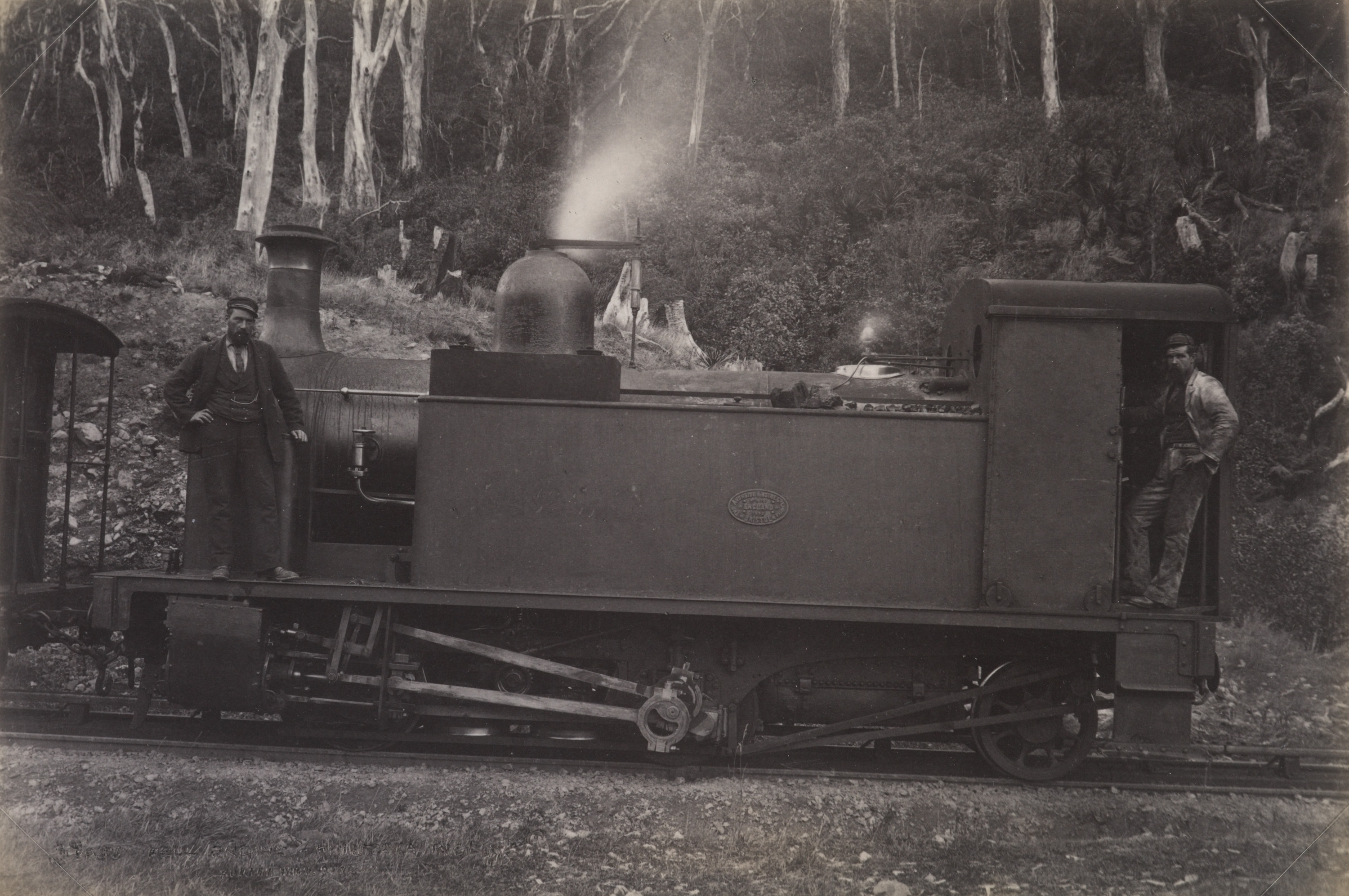
Fell engine at rest circa 1880

The contract began outside Summit tunnel and terminated at Featherston, a distance of 8 miles 76 chains (14.403 km). It included Cross Creek station yard and runaway siding. Several alterations were made to the contract both prior to and during construction, including the replacement of one of three tunnels by a cutting, and three wooden bridges by embankments.

The line descended at a grade of 1 in 15, passing through the 396-foot (121 m) long Horseshoe Gully Tunnel (later Siberia Tunnel). On leaving the tunnel, the line crossed the gully on a high earth and rock embankment, the largest on the section, on a five-chain radius curve. The embankment was about 180 to 200 feet (61 m) wide at its base, and around 90 feet (27 m) high at its centre line.

After the embankment, the line continued at a grade of 1 in 15 down to Cross's Creek (later Cross Creek) station. From Cross Creek the line descended at gradients varying from level to 1 in 40 to Lucena's (later Pigeon Bush), and from there in a straight line to Featherston.

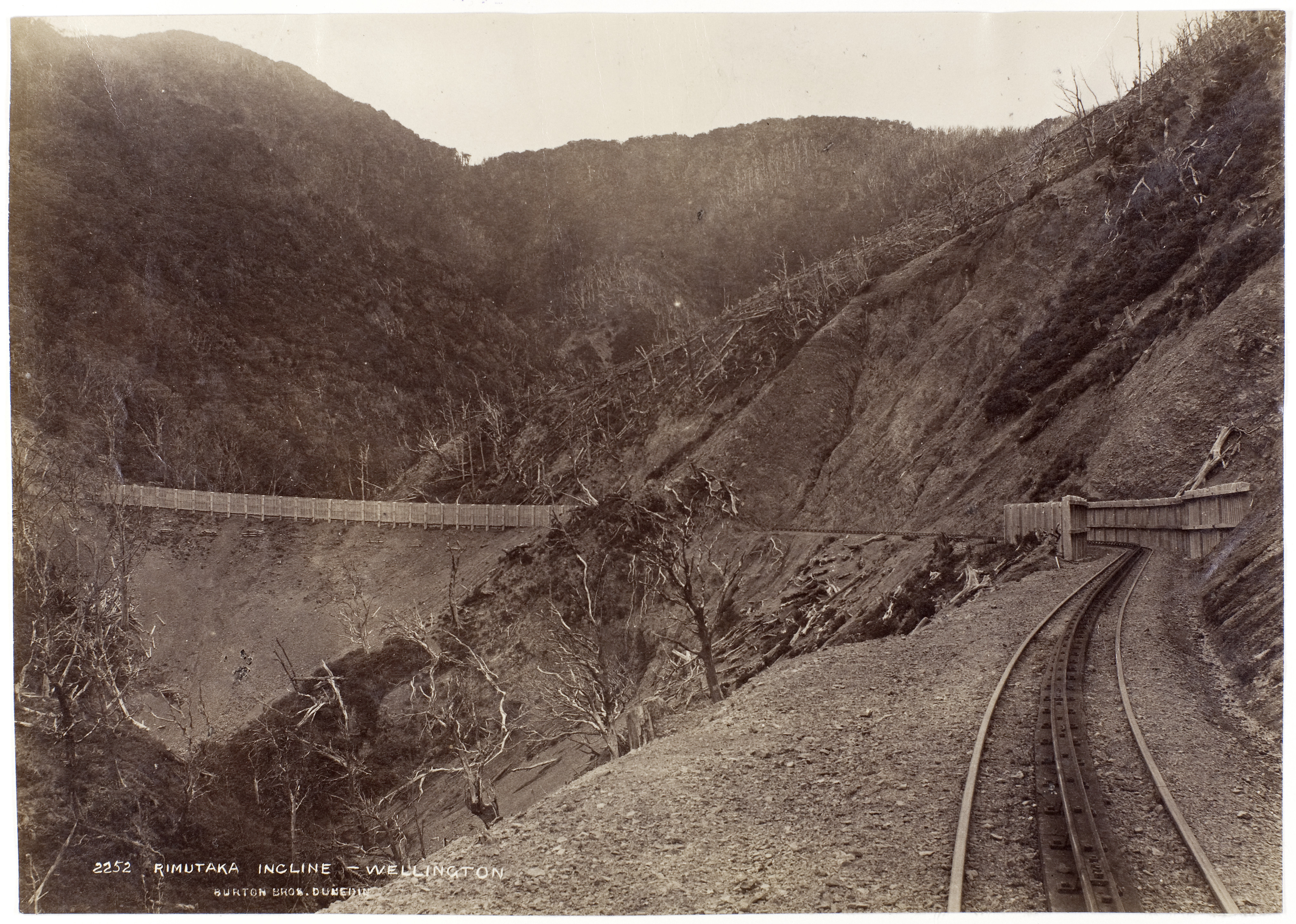
Siberia Curve

Work on the contract began on 22 October 1875. None of the major earthworks seem to have presented any great difficulties, save the lower tunnel, which was plagued by accidents and material failures largely because of the unstable nature of the rock through which it passed. The tunnel was named Price's after the manager McKirdy employed for this contract. On 2 March 1876, two men died due to a cave-in of the tunnel roof.

Between October 1877 and March 1878, platelaying was completed up to Summit. This enabled the use of work trains to haul up materials that were used to line Summit Tunnel. Track laying on the incline commenced in April 1878 and reached Cross Creek the following month. During this work, H 199 was stabled at Summit and used to haul work and ballast trains to the railhead.

Initially, only simple arrangements were made for the station yard at Cross's Creek, as it had yet to be decided the nature of operations on the Incline. It consisted of the main line, an engine siding of 10 chains, and the runaway siding.

After formation work continued beyond Cross Creek, McKirdy ran out of time and money, with the remainder of his contract being picked up by his guarantors, T. W. Young and Robert Greenfield. They finished the formation to Featherston on 17 August 1878, with track laying finishing the following month. The contract was completed 13 months late.

=== Operation ===
Initially, trains on the incline were limited to the weight that could be managed by a single locomotive. After complaints from management about the expense of running too many trains, two locomotives seem to have been used, both at the head of the train. From 1887 trains were worked with multiple locomotives, each at the head of its rated load. As the maximum weight of a train during this period was 150 tons, no more than three locomotives were used per train. Train operations continued to be modified until by 1908 the maximum load allowed per train had increased to 250 tons descending and 260 tons ascending.

When the line opened, there were two Fell brake vans in service, each 12 ft 6 in (3.81 m) long and 5 ft 9 in (1.75 m) from floor to ceiling, with open platforms at either end. The wear on the brake blocks fitted to these vans was so severe that a set of blocks seldom lasted more than one trip down the incline. Like the positioning and loading of the locomotives, the arrangements for positioning of the Fell vans varied until they were largely standardised by 1897. For ascending trains, Fell vans were placed at the rear of the train. For descending trains, a Fell van was placed between the locomotives and the leading vehicle. If the gross weight of the train exceeded 120 tons or included more than 15 vehicles (excluding the locomotives in both cases) a second Fell van was attached to the rear of the train. These rules applied before the introduction of the Westinghouse continuous air brake. The Fell locomotives were never turned, running cab first on descending trains.

As descending trains departed Summit, the "through" guard applied the brakes on the leading vehicle, then moved through the train applying the brakes on the other vehicles until he reached the train van, which also had brakes that had to be applied. Each Fell van had its own guard to operate the two sets of brakes.

After the introduction of the continuous brake system in 1903 it became possible to operate trains with five locomotives, and on descending passenger trains up to five Fell brake vans could be used – two next to the locomotives, one in the middle, and two at the rear. As each brake van had its own guard and the train had a train guard and locomotive crews, a train with five brake vans and four locomotives had a crew of 14, which added to the expense of the operation. Moreover, to reduce the strain on couplings, when several locomotives were used they would be distributed through the train, as can be seen from photos. This necessitated significant remarshalling of the train at either end of the incline.

Instructions issued in 1885 regarding the use of the safety siding required that the points for the incline be set to the safety siding. As descending trains approached the Cross Creek yard, the driver of the leading locomotive sounded a long whistle, which signalled that all was well. On hearing this signal the signalman would set the points for the arrival road. Cross Creek had an unusual six-lever partially-interlocked signalling installation and had no "distant" signals so had points indicators which applied to the "main" line (see Heine for station layout), while Summit had a fully interlocked 27-lever frame.

Unusual traffic included four royal trains: for the Prince of Wales in 1921; the Duke (later King George VI) and Duchess of York in 1927; the Duke of Gloucester in 1935; and Queen Elizabeth II and the Duke of Edinburgh in 1954. Trains were diverted from the Manawatu line due to slips, floods or other mishaps.

The original yards at Cross Creek and Summit were sufficient for the traffic levels of the time, but increasing traffic brought about incremental additions. The full extent of the Summit yard was reached in 1903, which coincided with the introduction of full signalling and interlocking, not introduced to Cross Creek until 1915.

H class locomotives were not to be operated on any part of the railway other than the Incline, with the sole exception of conveying them to the Petone (and later Hutt) Workshops for maintenance. In the latter case, bunkers, water tanks and boilers were to be empty, and the locomotives were to be towed at a speed not exceeding 10 miles per hour (16 km/h). These rules were relaxed to allow the locomotives to travel light engine to Petone and back under their own steam, subject to the same speed restrictions. In 1887 they were permitted to be operated between Cross Creek and Pigeon Bush, later extended to Featherston to enable them to be used for banking purposes. Running rights between Cross Creek and Featherston were revoked about 1943.

Speed limits for trains on the Incline were changed several times. From 1884 to 1888 the limit was 6 mph (9.7 km/h) ascending and descending, except light passenger trains for which the limit was 8 mph (13 km/h). In 1888 these limits changed to 5 mph (8.0 km/h) up, 9 mph (14 km/h) down. The limits were finally 6 mph (9.7 km/h) up, 10 mph (16 km/h) down.

Various classes of locomotives were deployed to supplement the H class when one or more were away for maintenance or repairs, including:

- W 192 and 238 2-6-2 tank locomotives, built in 1889 and 1891 respectively, which spent most of their time on the Wellington to Summit section until their transfer in 1909;
- 54-ton W^{E} 4-6-4 tank locomotives rebuilt from 4-8-0 B class locomotives, rated to haul passenger trains up to 55 tons and goods trains up to 60 tons, until 1906, after which they were used mainly on the Upper Hutt to Summit section and rated to haul passenger trains up to 130 tons, mixed trains 150 tons and goods trains 155 tons, and were then later sent to work on the Rewanui Incline in the South Island;
- 65-ton E 66, rated to haul 80 tons up the Incline, and nicknamed Pearson's Dream. In 1910 it was transferred to banking duties on the Wellington to Johnsonville section, but it was never popular with crew.
- W^{G} 480 4-6-4 tank locomotive, during the Great War.

After the Great War traffic was well within the capabilities of the six H class locomotives.

The mileages run by the H class locomotives show notable increases that correspond to economic and other major events, such as the opening of the Wairarapa Line as far as Masterton, completion of the line to Woodville, and the nationalisation of the Wellington and Manawatu Railway Company. With the opening of the railway to Masterton, the annual mileage of the H class rose from less than 7,000 to more than 8,000 in 1883–1897 to 34,000, and to 42,000 when the line was opened to Woodville and began carrying traffic from the Hawke's Bay. Mileage peaked at 64,123 in 1906–07, about 10,687 miles per locomotive or 1,780 return Incline trips.

==== Wairarapa railcars ====
In 1936 seven lightweight Wairarapa railcars, RM 4–10, were introduced between Palmerston North, Masterton and Wellington. They were specifically designed for the Incline and were built at the Hutt Workshops. They were named after historic Māori canoes: Maahunui, Mahuhu, Mamari, Matahourua, Mataatua, Arai-te-Uru and Arawa. Initially powered by 130 horsepower (97 kW) Leyland petrol engines, they were upgraded after several years to 120 horsepower (89 kW) diesel engines. They had a single rear driving axle with 38½" (978 mm) diameter wheels, necessitated by the need for the axle and final drive unit to have sufficient clearance above the Incline’s centre rail. Because of the large rear wheels, the floor of the passenger compartment was 52½" (1334 mm) above rail level, more than 12 inches (300 mm) higher than normal. They were rated for a maximum speed of 60 mph (97 km/h) and expected to climb the Incline at 15-17 mph, but actually managed only 10–12 mph. Nevertheless, they greatly sped up passenger trains on the route and immediately proved popular. They were withdrawn in 1955 when the Incline closed.

=== Replacement ===
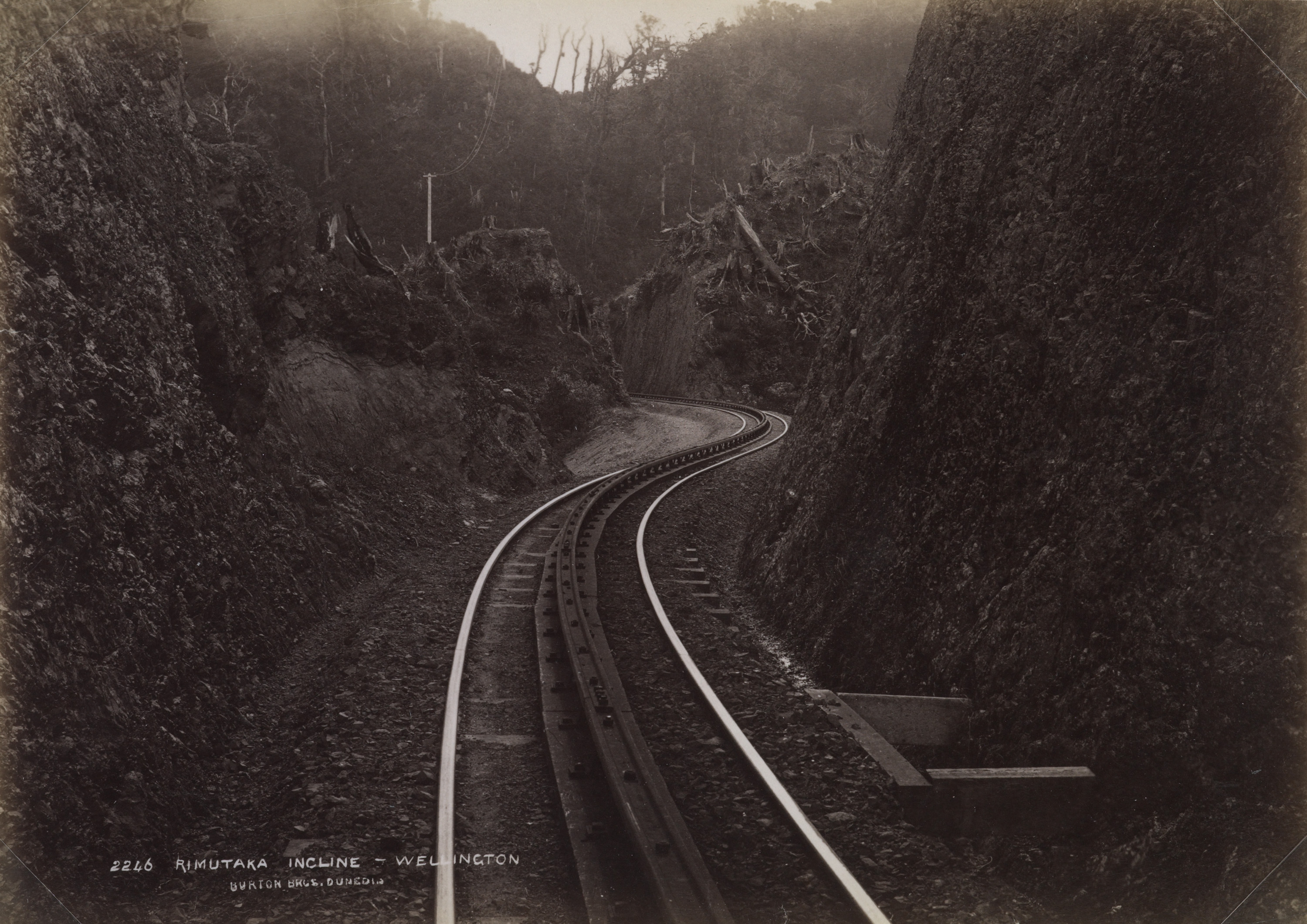
Close-up of the rail

Several options for an alternative to the Incline were considered in the 20th century. In 1914 the NZR General Manager E. H. Hiley proposed urgent replacement of the incline as one of a number of deferred projects. But action on his report was deferred until after World War I.

After the Second World War, the option of a tunnel between Maymorn and Lucena's Creek was selected. Construction was started in 1948 by the Public Works Department, and completed by the private contractor Morrison-Knudsen-Downer in 1955. The tunnel and deviation opened on 3 November 1955, five days after the Incline closed.

Demolition of the incline was swift, with the removal of track between Cross Creek and Pigeon Bush largely completed by March 1956. H 199 was used to haul the work trains that removed the track between Cross Creek and Summit. The buildings were sold at auction, on site. Some of the rails were sent to the Rewanui Incline, as were a couple of the Fell brake vans. Five of the six H class locomotives were towed to the Hutt Workshops, later to Silverstream, to be scrapped.

== Today ==
=== Museum ===
A museum dedicated to the preservation of the only remaining H-class "Fell" locomotive was opened at Featherston in 1984. H 199 had previously been given to the town of Featherston, and had been a static display in a local park from 1958. Later, a lease was secured on F 210, the sole remaining Fell brake van, which is now also on display in the museum.

=== Rail trail ===
A resurgence of public interest in the incline followed the publication of a book in 1976 and the opening of the Fell Engine Museum in the early 1980s, prompting the New Zealand Forest Service to re-establish access to Cross Creek in 1984. Interest increased following the publication of an article in the NZ Runner magazine, in the November-December 1984 issue, which promoted this incline as a backcountry running opportunity. The official opening of a rail trail using the formation of the original railway line from Cross Creek to Kaitoke followed in 1987. It is today one of the more popular recreational facilities in the region and forms part of the Remutaka Forest Park.

=== Children′s book ===
Inspired by H 199, Joy Cowley authored Hero of the hill in 2013. The book traces the train's journey up the incline during a particularly stormy night.

== Future Plans ==
In October 2005 a reunion of former NZR staff and friends who worked the Incline was held in Featherston, including a visit on 29 October to Cross Creek to commemorate 50 years since the last train ran on the Incline. On the same day a ″first spike″ ceremony was held at Maymorn to mark the beginning of the Rimutaka Incline Railway Heritage Trust's project to reinstate the railway.

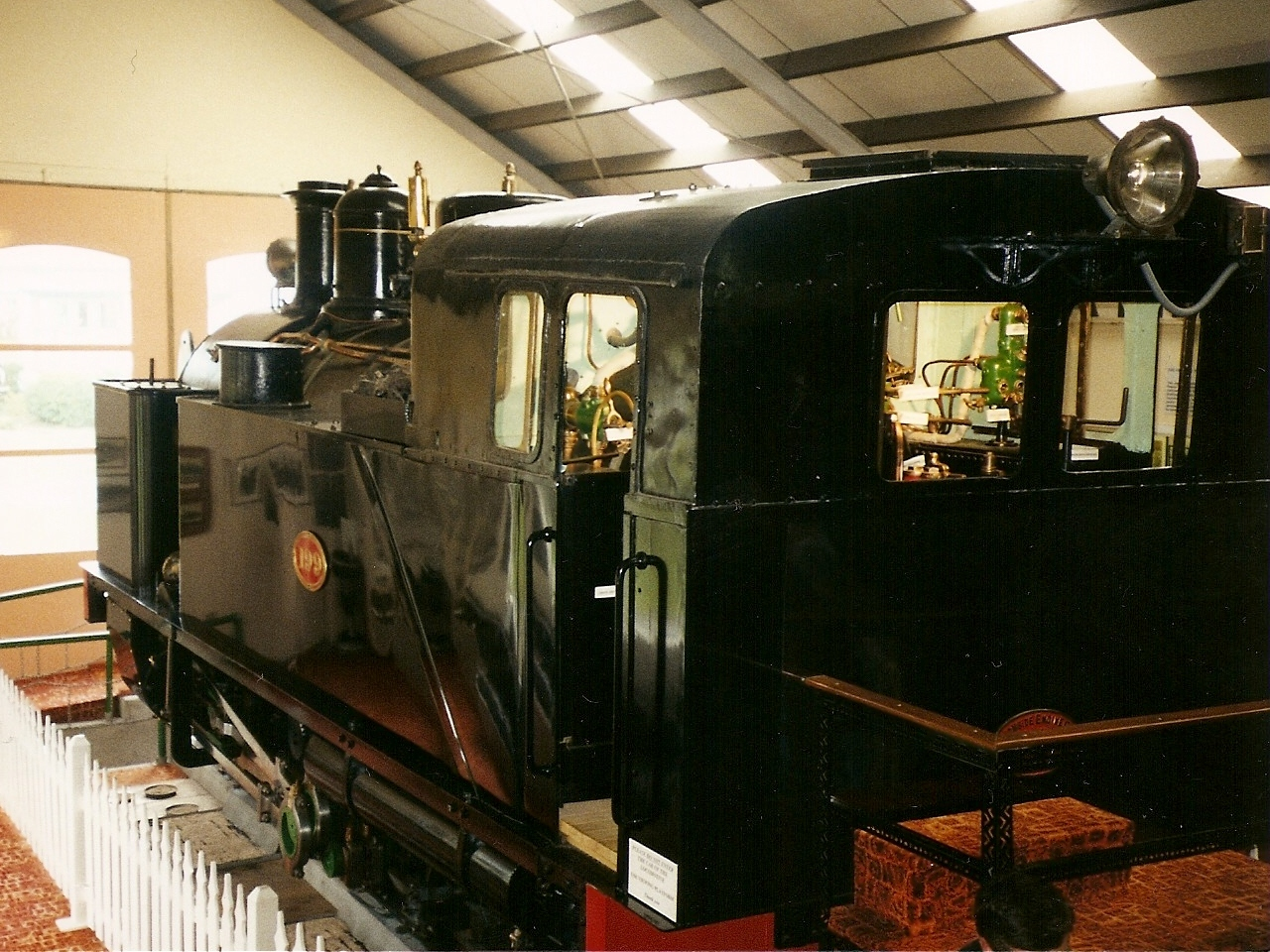
H 199, one of the locomotives used on the Incline, preserved at the Fell Locomotive Museum

On 8 August 2003 the trust was inaugurated with the intention of reinstating the line in four stages: Upper Hutt to Summit; Wellington to Upper Hutt (using KiwiRail's Wairarapa Line); Summit to Cross Creek; Cross Creek to Featherston. The base of operations is on land leased from KiwiRail at Maymorn. Largely thanks to the establishment of the Remutaka Rail Trail, most of the original formation has been preserved and is proposed to be incorporated into the reinstated rail operation, with new works required at Maymorn to link the original formation to the station yard and a deviation at Kaitoke to bypass formation land that is now in private ownership. The original route from Upper Hutt to the Mangaroa Valley is not included in the trust's plans.

Work on the project is currently at stage one, with the acquisition of rolling stock for restoration, fencing, track laying in the yard, and the construction of a rail vehicle shed.

== See also ==
- List of rail trails
- NZR H class (locomotive) (NZR H Class H199 Mount Cenis preserved locomotive]]
- NZR E class (locomotive)
- NZR RM class (Wairarapa) (railcar)
- Pahiatua Railcar Society's project to restore the sole surviving "RM" class Wairarapa railcar.
- Wairarapa Line
- Kaitoke railway station
- Summit railway station, New Zealand
- Cross Creek railway station
- Pigeon Bush railway station
- Featherston railway station
- Rimutaka Incline railway accident (1880 and 1936)
