= NZR H Class H199 Mount Cenis =

1875 0-4-2T New Zealand steam rack locomotive

NZR H199 Mount Cenis
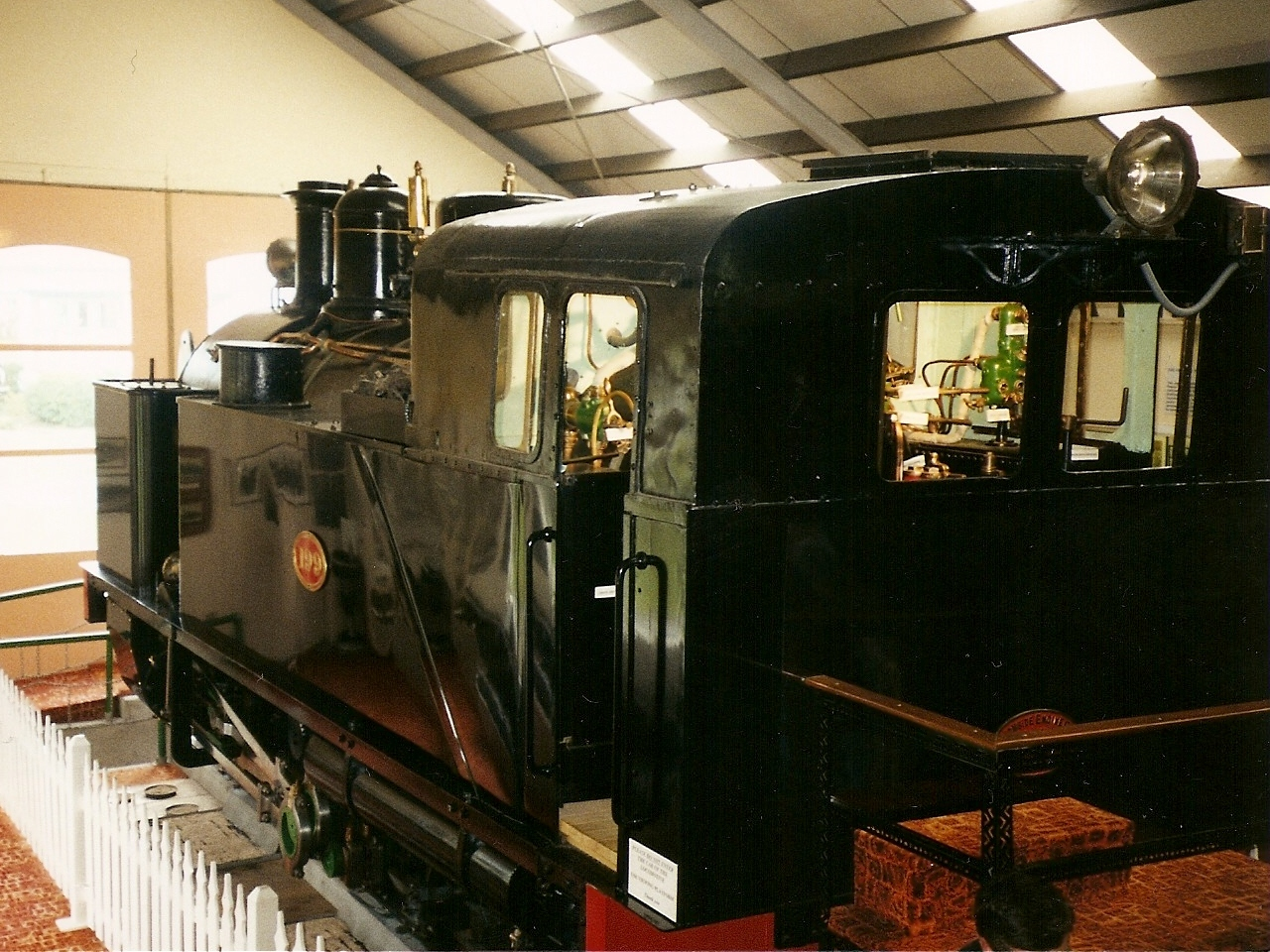
- H199 in the Fell Engine Museum
Type and origin
- Power type: Steam
- Designer: Avonside Engine Co., England
- Build date: 1875
Specifications
- Configuration
  - Whyte: 0-4-2T
- Gauge: 3 ft 6 in (1,067 mm)
- Driver dia.: 32 in (813 mm) driving 23.5 in (597 mm) adhesion
- Wheelbase: 14 ft 3 in (4.34 m)
- Length: 24 ft 1 in (7.34 m)
- Loco weight: 39.8 long tons (40.4 t; 44.6 short tons)
- Fuel type: Coal
- Fuel capacity: 0.5 long tons (0.51 t; 0.56 short tons)
- Water cap.: 714 imp gal (3,250 L; 857 US gal)
- Boiler pressure: 160 psi (1,100 kPa)
- Cylinders: Four, two driving, two adhesion
- Cylinder size: 14 in × 16 in (356 mm × 406 mm) driving 12 in × 14 in (305 mm × 356 mm) adhesion
- Valve gear: Stephenson
Performance figures
- Maximum speed: 15 mph (24 km/h)
- Tractive effort: 12,550 lbf (55.8 kN) driving 1,000 lbf (49 kN) adhesion
Career
- Restored: 1989
- Disposition: Preserved

NZR H199 Mount Cenis is a preserved NZR H class 0-4-2T steam locomotive. It is the only surviving rack locomotive in New Zealand and the only surviving steam locomotive to use the fell rack system in the world. The locomotive is preserved at the Fell Engine Museum in Featherston in the Wellington Region of New Zealand.

== History and service ==
H199 was built in 1875 as the first of four Avonside-built locomotives made for the at the time under construction Rimutaka Incline. H199 and the other three were designated as the H class and introduced to the line in 1877 due to construction delays and issues and were later joined by two Neilson-built locomotives in 1886. All members of the H class were named after mountains, with H199 being Mount Cenis after the mountain that had the first fell rack railway although being spelt with a slightly anglofied version rather than the more used spelling Mont Cenis. After the opening of the Rimutaka Tunnel in 1955 H199, along with the five other members of the H class was withdrawn and retired in 1956 after the closure of the Rimutaka Incline.

== Preservation ==
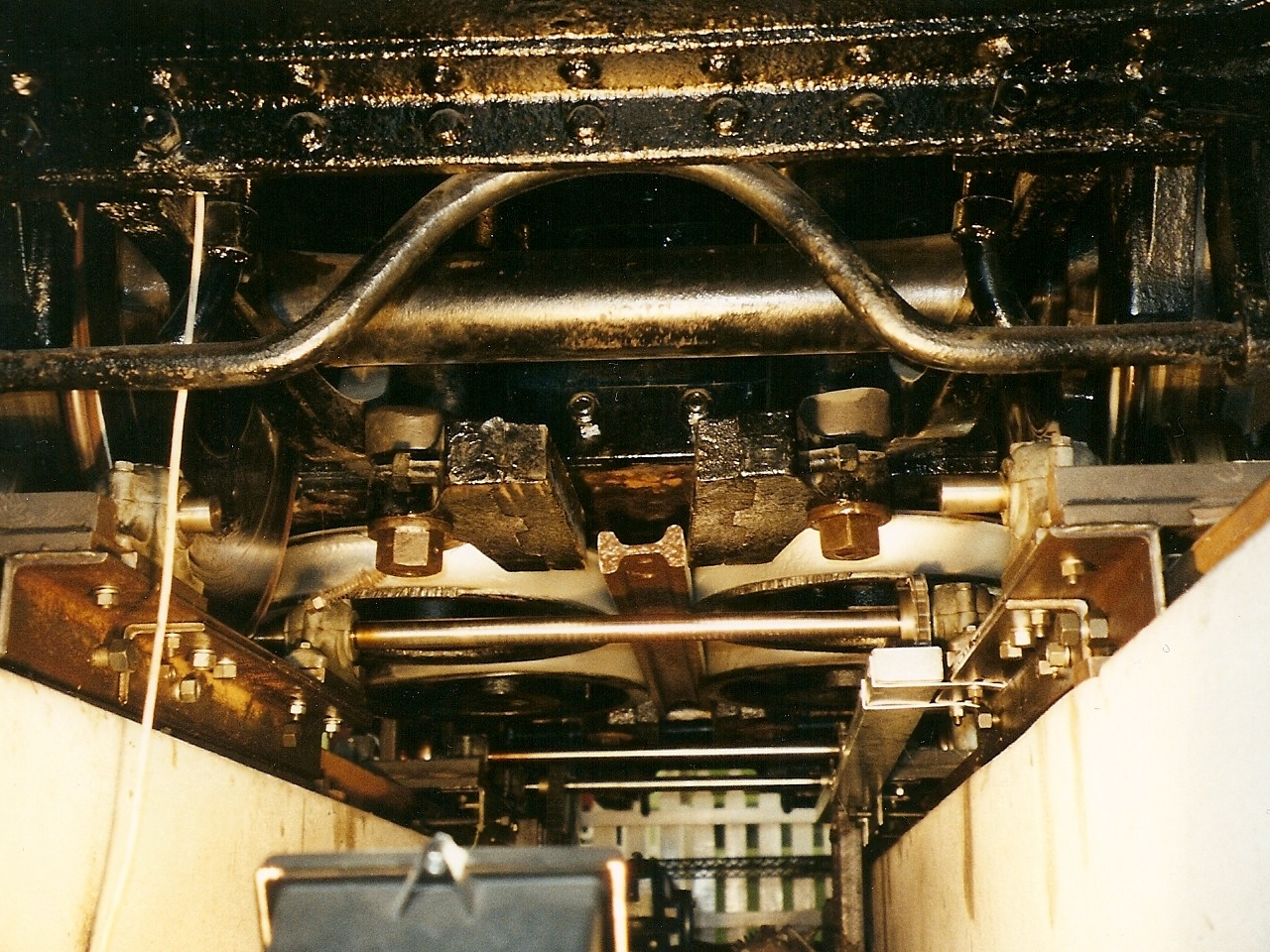
The underside of H 199, showing details of the Fell railway system, 20 March 2002.

H199 was donated to Featherston two years later in 1958. It was placed in a park at Clifford Square where it remained part of a children's playground until 1981 when the newly formed Friends of the Fell Society moved it for static restoration due to deterioration. Three years later in 1984, the Fell Engine Museum was constructed to house H199 adjacent to the playground. The locomotive's restoration was completed in 1989 and was later joined by a fell brake van in 1997. Although on static display, H199 is mounted on rollers powered by electric motors to allow people to see how its moving parts work.
