= Estrada de Ferro Cantagalo =

Railway line in Brazil

Cantagalo Railway
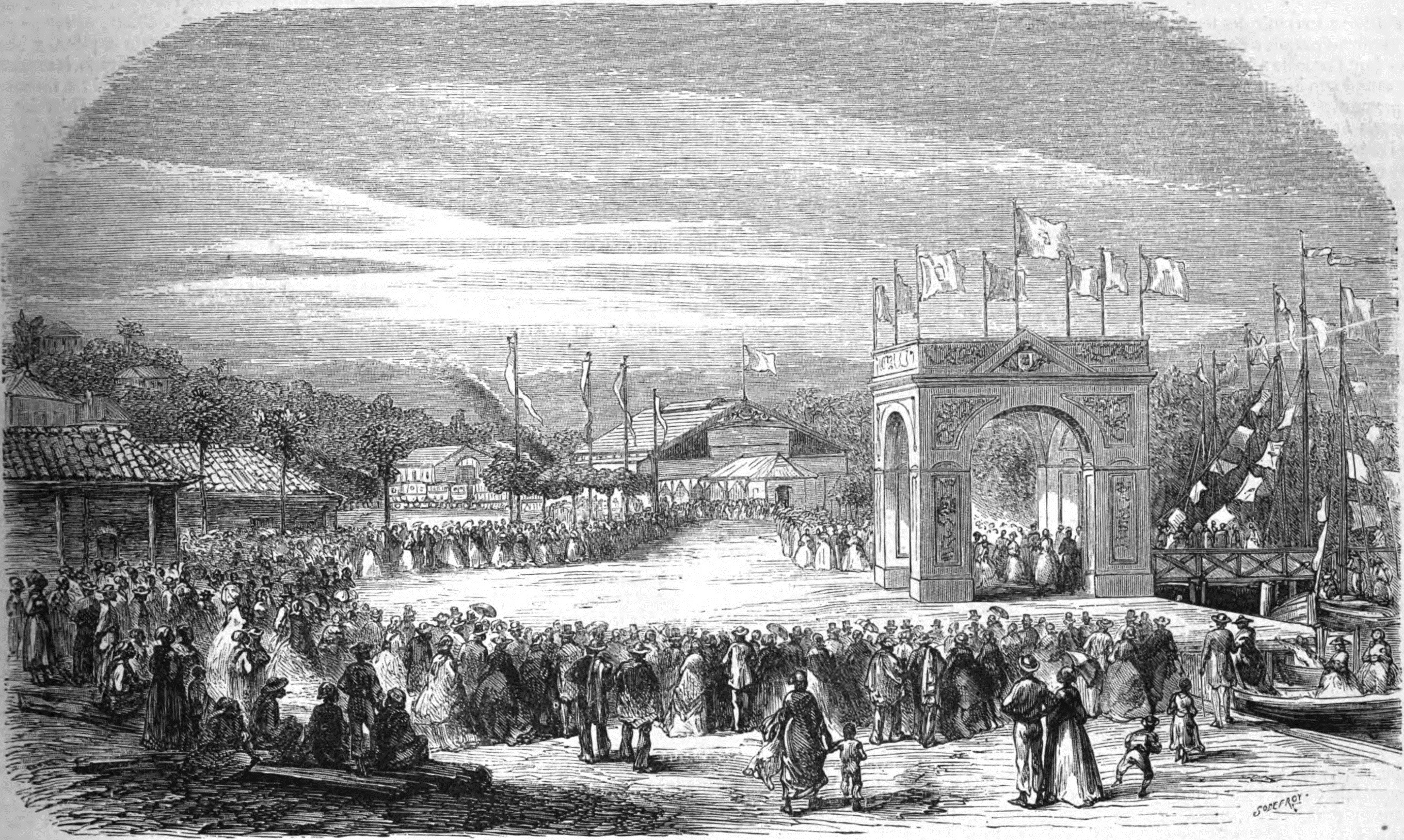
- Inauguration of the Cantagalo Railway (Wood-engraving after Godefroy Durand, from L'Illustration, 16 June 1860).

Overview
- Locale: Southeastern Brazil
- Dates of operation: 1873–1965

Technical
- Track gauge: 1,000 mm (3 ft 3 3/8 in) metre gauge

The Estrada de Ferro Cantagalo (English: Cantagalo Railway) in Brazil operated from 1873 to 1965, and used the Fell mountain railway system, with equipment from the temporary Mont Cenis Pass Railway which closed in 1871. From 1883 the Fell rail was used for braking only. Cameron says that the line was 1,000 mm (3 ft 3 3/8 in) metre gauge to which the locomotives and rolling stock were converted (though another source says that the line was to the same 1,100 mm (3 ft 7 5/16 in) gauge as the Mont Cenis Pass Railway). The line was built by British engineers and capital.

The railway, from Niterói to Nova Friburgo, was Brazil's first mountain railway. The coastal plain was followed by a steep rise of 3,600 feet (1,100 m) to the inland plateau, starting at Cachoeiras de Macacu, and spread over 32 miles (51 km), with the steepest section of about 7 3/4 miles (12.5 km) between Boca do Mato and Theodoro de Olivera: 6 1/2 miles (10.5 km) was 1 in 12, and 1 1/4 miles (2.0 km) between 1 in 14 and 1 in 33 (7% and 3%). Curvature was severe, from 111 to 328 feet (34 to 100 metres) radius.

== Rolling stock ==
The initial locomotives were 0-4-0Ts weighing about 16 short tons (14.3 long tons; 14.5 t), and another 14 (probably) came from the Mont Cenis Pass Line. Four new locomotives were purchased from Manning Wardle of England in 1876, though they proved of limited capacity and expensive to maintain, and were possibly affected by the Brazilian climate. They were replaced in 1883 by new 44-ton adhesion-only locomotives from the Baldwin Locomotive Works, though the Fell centre rail was retained for braking. Two North British Locomotive Company engines were bought in 1929.

The line became part of the Leopoldina Railway in 1911, and closed about 1965.
