= Fell Locomotive Museum =

Coordinates: 41.1180°S 175.3279°E

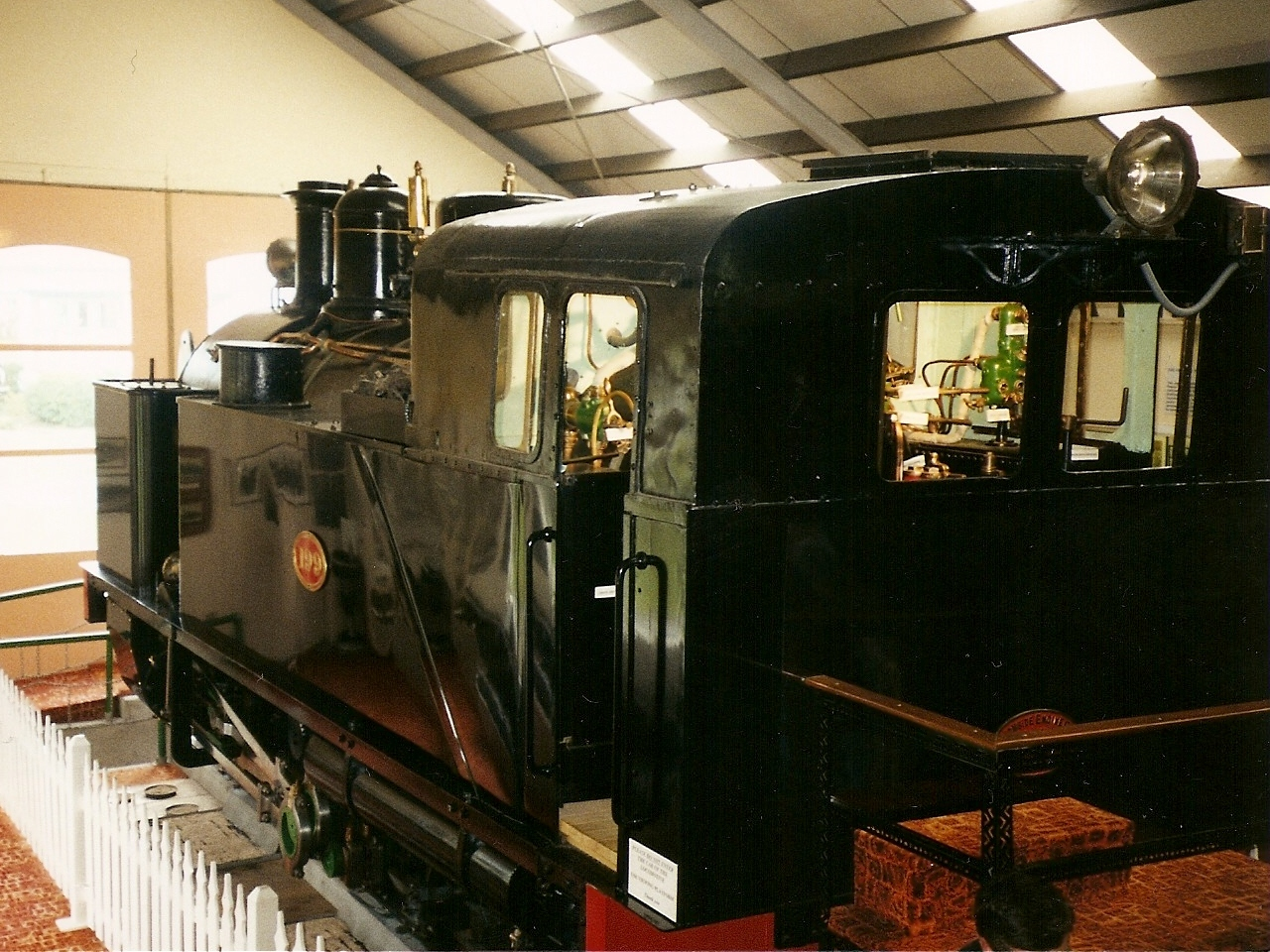
H199 in the Fell Engine Museum, 20 March 2002.

The Fell Locomotive Museum is a railway museum in Featherston, New Zealand, which exhibits the only remaining steam-powered Fell railway locomotive in the world.

From 1877, locomotive H 199 climbed 265 metres (869 ft) up the 4.8-kilometre (3.0 mi) Rimutaka Incline using John Barraclough Fell's unique method of four grip wheels on a raised centre rail. It is housed and tended to by a group of dedicated rail enthusiasts.

H 199 is one of six H class locomotives designed for use on the 1 in 15 Rimutaka Incline, where they worked for 77 years. Their story is recalled by audio-visual programmes, models, photographs and memorabilia in the museum.

== History ==
At the official opening ceremony for the Rimutaka Tunnel on 3 November 1955 at Speedy's Crossing, the Minister for Railways, John McAlpine, presented H 199 to the Borough of Featherston for display. After H 199 completed its duties on the demolition trains removing the Incline track it was towed to Hutt Workshops where it was stored until August 1958, when it was towed to Featherston and mounted on a plinth in a playground for children to play on.

In 1980, it became obvious that the locomotive was deteriorating through age and exposure to the elements. The Friends of the Fell Society was formed with the objective of preserving and housing it. Restoration work commenced in 1981 and proceeded as volunteer labour was available. During the restoration work, the museum was constructed across the main road and next to the town's old courthouse.

In late February 1984, H 199 was prepared for relocation to the museum, scheduled to happen on 10 March 1984. On relocation day the locomotive was loaded onto a house removal truck and transported to the museum, where it was lifted onto a temporary track-set that enabled it to be winched into the building. Restoration work continued until 1988. It has never been the intention of the Friends of the Fell to steam the locomotive, though it has been restored to near fully working order. It is mounted on rollers driven by an electric motor so visitors to the museum can see the moving parts in action.

In 1995, the Friends of the Fell Society secured a lease on F 210, the sole remaining Fell brake van, from the MoTaT for display in the museum. One of the conditions of the lease was that the van would be restored to the condition it was in when in service.

With the arrival of F 210 in Featherston in June 1995 courtesy of Tranz Rail, restoration commenced in the workshop of the nearby Batavia Rubber Company Limited. The museum was extended, and on 11 December 1996, F 210 was transported to its new home, where restoration was completed on 20 August 1997.
