= NZR H class =

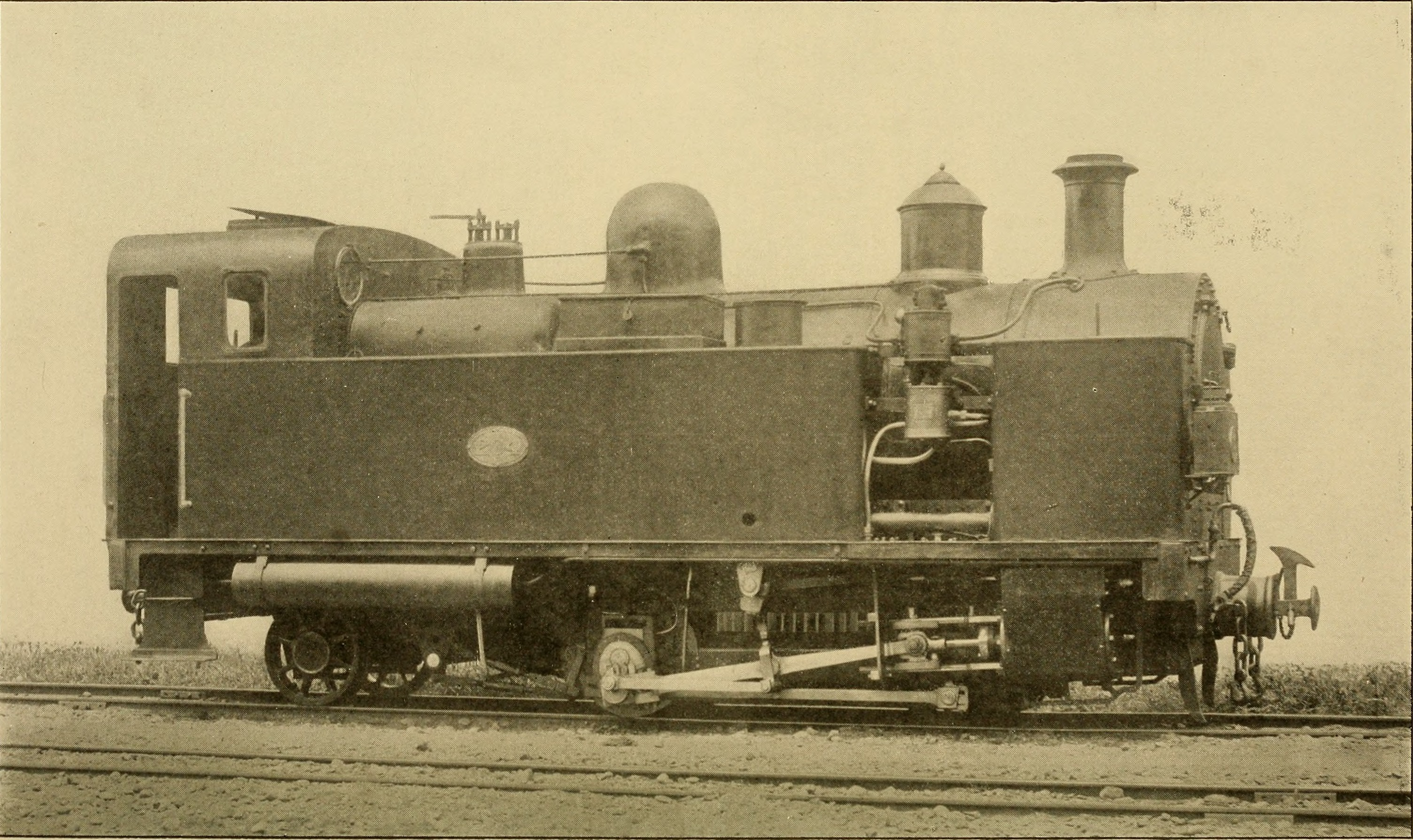
- H class 204, pictured in 1904
Type and origin
- Power type: Steam
- Builder: Avonside Engine Co., England (4); Neilson & Co., Scotland (2)
- Serial number: Avonside 1072–1075; Neilson 3468–3469
- Build date: 1875 (4); 1886 (2)
Specifications
- Configuration
  - Whyte: 0-4-2T
- Gauge: 3 ft 6 in (1,067 mm)
- Wheel diameter: 32 in (813 mm) driving 23.5 in (597 mm) adhesion
- Wheelbase: 14 ft 3 in (4.34 m)
- Length: 24 ft 1 in (7.34 m)
- Width: 8 ft 6 in (2.59 m)
- Adhesive weight: 32.4 long tons (32.9 t; 36.3 short tons)
- Loco weight: 39.8 long tons (40.4 t; 44.6 short tons)
- Fuel type: Coal
- Fuel capacity: 0.5 long tons (0.51 t; 0.56 short tons)
- Water cap.: 714 imp gal (3,250 L; 857 US gal)
- Firebox
  - Grate area: 16.8 sq ft (1.6 m^{2})
- Boiler pressure: 160 psi (1,100 kPa)
- Heating surface: 794 sq ft (73.8 m^{2})
- Cylinders: Four total two driving, two adhesion
- Cylinder size: 14 in × 16 in (356 mm × 406 mm) driving 12 in × 14 in (305 mm × 356 mm) adhesion
- Valve gear: Stephenson (199 - 202); Joy (203 - 204)
Performance figures
- Maximum speed: 15 mph (24 km/h)
- Tractive effort: 12,550 lbf (55.8 kN) driving 11,000 lbf (49 kN) adhesion
Career
- Number in class: 6
- Numbers: 199 – 204
- Locale: Rimutaka Incline, Wairarapa, North Island
- First run: 1878
- Last run: 29 October 1955
- Retired: March 1956
- Preserved: One (H 199)
- Restored: 1981 - 1989
- Scrapped: 1956
- Current owner: Fell Engine Museum
- Disposition: 5 scrapped 1 preserved 2 replicas planned.

The NZR H class steam locomotive is a unique class of Fell locomotive used by New Zealand Railways (NZR) on the Rimutaka Incline, the 3-mile (4.8 km) section of 1 in 15 (6.67 %) gradient between Cross Creek and Summit, over the Rimutaka Ranges.

== Introduction ==
The first four H class locomotives were built for NZR by the Avonside Engine Company in 1875, and introduced on the Rimutaka Incline from its opening in 1877. They were named after mountains:

- Mount Cenis (H 199)
- Mount Cook (H 200)
- Mount Egmont (H 201)
- Mount Tongariro (H 202).

In 1886 two additional locomotives were introduced, built by Neilson and Company. The Neilson Locomotives were known as the Dreadnoughts.

== Design ==
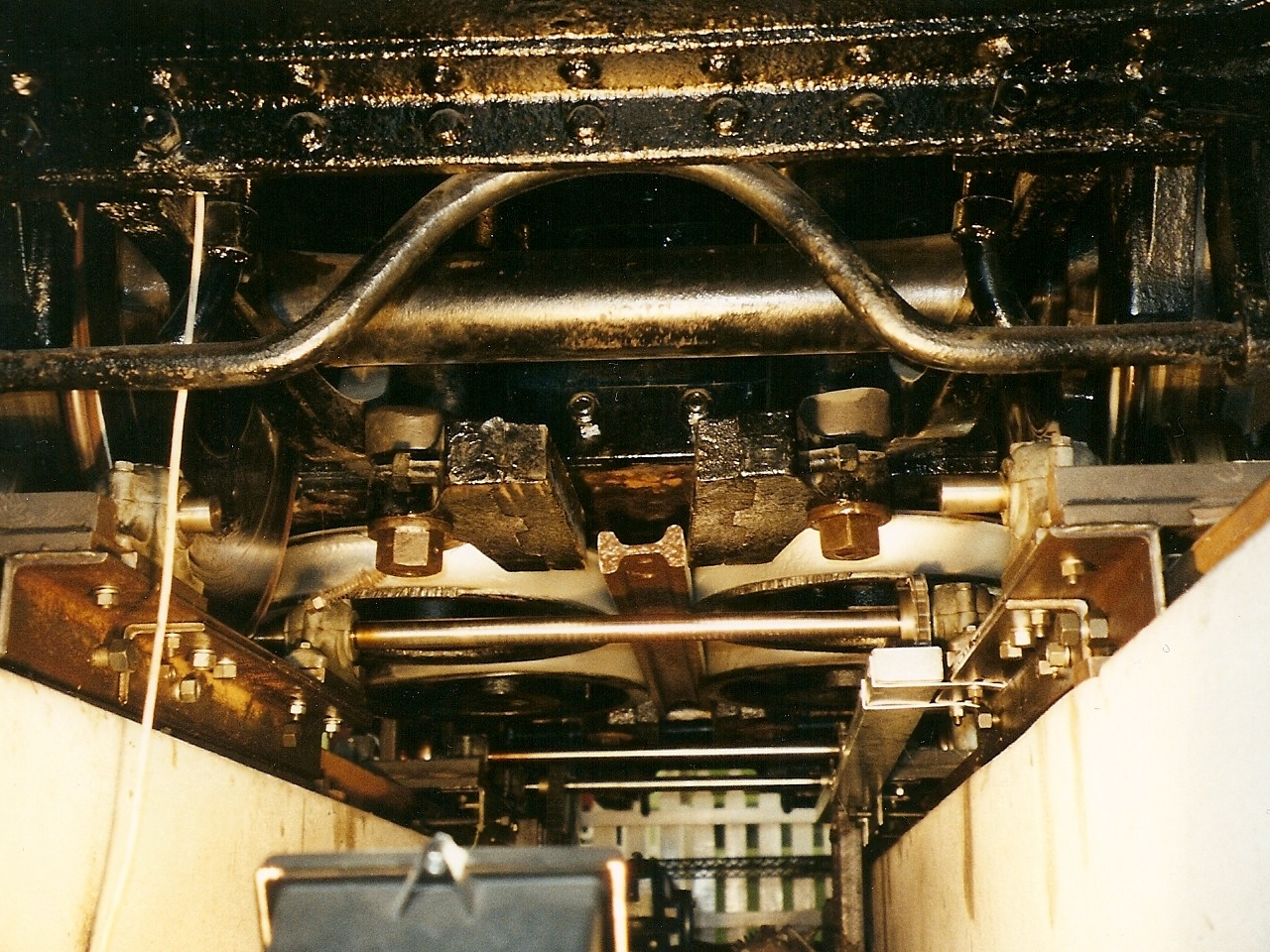
The underside of H 199, showing details of the Fell railway system, 20 March 2002.

The locomotives worked on the Fell mountain railway system and had four horizontal driving wheels between the frames, gripping a centre rail and providing the extra adhesion needed for the climb. The outside engines drove the rear pair of coupled wheels of 32 in (813 mm) diameter, and the inside cylinders four spring-loaded grip wheels of 22 in (559 mm) diameter. On the descent, powerful hand-brakes bore against the centre rail, and brake vans with similar braking gear were interspersed at intervals in the train. The locomotives were never required to run at speeds higher than 15 mph (24 km/h), and their usual operating speed was between four and six miles per hour (6.4 and 9.7 km/h) ascending the incline, about ten miles per hour (16 km/h) descending.

== Withdrawal ==
After the Second World War, the locomotives were starting to show their age, and the New Zealand government was looking for a way to cut the time between Wellington and the Wairarapa. On 7 May 1951, the contract to construct the 8.8-kilometre (5.5 mi) Rimutaka Tunnel was signed, which spelt the end of the incline, and the need for the H class.

The last revenue service for the H class was on 29 October 1955, when locomotives 199, 201, 202, 203 and 204 hauled a Carterton Show day excursion train up the incline on the return journey to Wellington. When the Rimutaka Tunnel opened five days later, two of the engines were put to work dismantling the incline that they had travelled on for 77 years.

After the closure and dismantling of the line, in February 1956 all of the H class - except H 200 which had been out of service for some time with a collapsed internal steam pipe - were towed to Hutt Workshops. All were written off in March 1956. All except H 199 were towed to the old Silverstream rail yard in 1957 where they were scrapped. H 199 was towed to Featherston on 9 August 1958 by D^{E} 508 (itself now preserved) and put on display in the park in Clifford Square the following month. Years later in 1989 after an 8 year long restoration the locomotive became the centre piece in the Fell Locomotive Museum at Featherston.

== Preservation ==
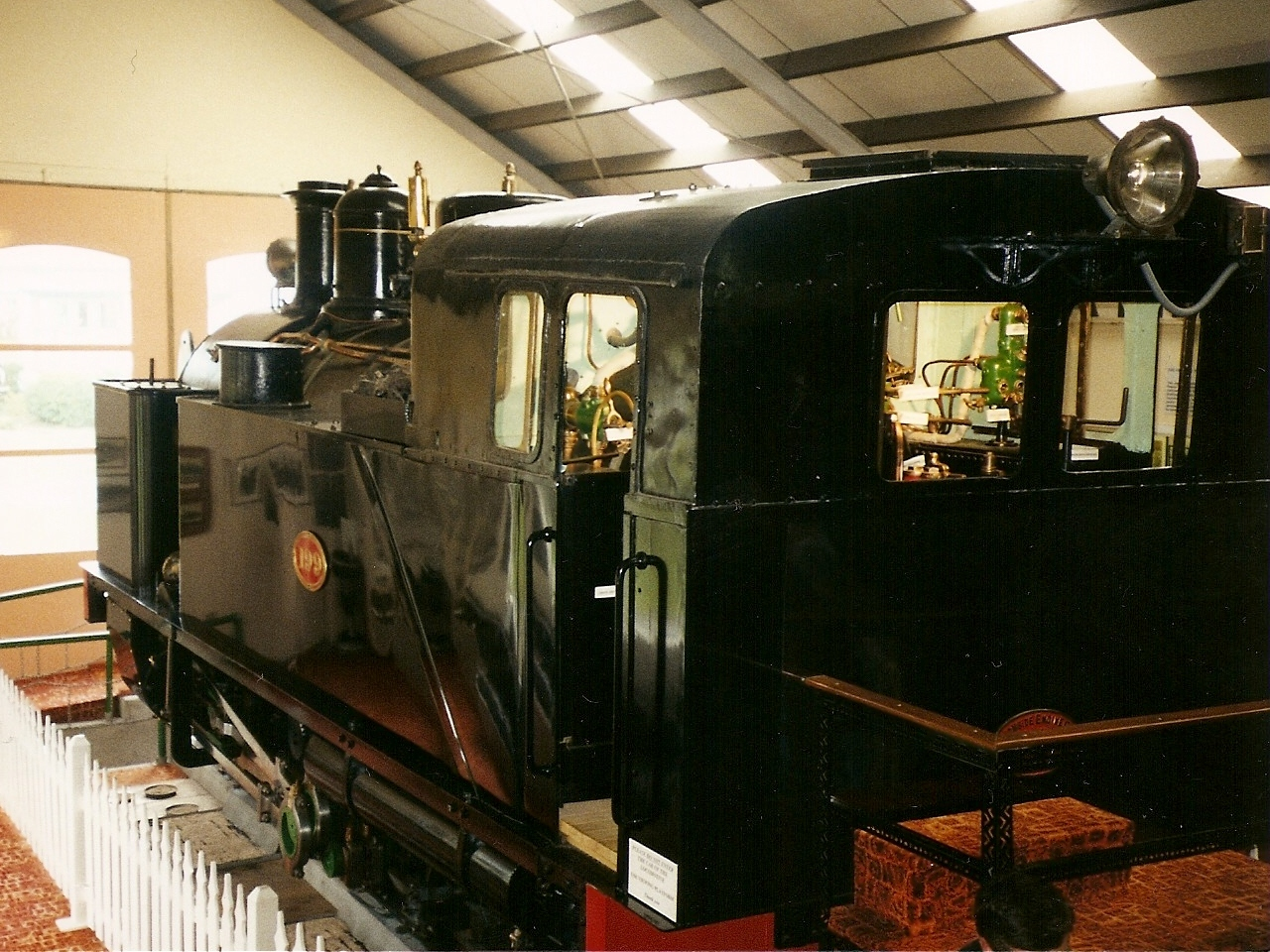
H 199 in the Fell Engine Museum, 20 March 2002.

At the opening ceremony for the Rimutaka Tunnel on 3 November 1955, the then Minister of Railways John McAlpine gifted locomotive H 199 to the town of Featherston. Following the dismantling the incline, H 199 was stored at the Hutt Workshops for three years, before being moved through the Rimutaka Tunnel to Featherston. The locomotive was placed on a concrete plinth in a children's playground.

Over the years, exposure to the elements and vandalism had deteriorated the locomotive's condition. In 1980, the Friends of the Fell Society was formed with the intention of restoring H 199 for static display. Restoration began in 1981, and in 1984, the locomotive was moved into the new Fell Engine Museum adjacent to the playground. The restoration of the locomotive was completed in 1989. The society won the A & G Price Locomotive Restoration in 1990. The Rimutaka Incline Railway Heritage Trust plans to build 2 replicas of the H Class for phase 3 of their restoration plans.
