= Fell mountain railway system =

Third-rail system for railways

The Fell system was a third-rail system for railways that were too steep to be worked by adhesion on the running rails alone. It used a raised centre rail between the two running rails to provide extra traction and braking, or braking alone. Trains were propelled by wheels horizontally applied and retracted by springs onto the centre rail, controlled from the footplate, as well as by the normal running wheels. In practice, the running wheels could be allowed to run freely to reduce wear, but the centre brake shoes needed to be replaced frequently. For example: the locomotives' shoes were replaced after each journey on the Mont Cenis Pass Railway. Extra brake shoes were fitted to specially designed or adapted Fell locomotives and brake vans, and for traction the prototype locomotive had auxiliary cylinders powering the horizontal wheels. The Fell system was developed in the 1860s and was soon superseded by various types of rack railway for new lines, but some Fell systems remained in use into the 1960s. The Snaefell Mountain Railway still uses the Fell system for (emergency) braking, but not for traction.

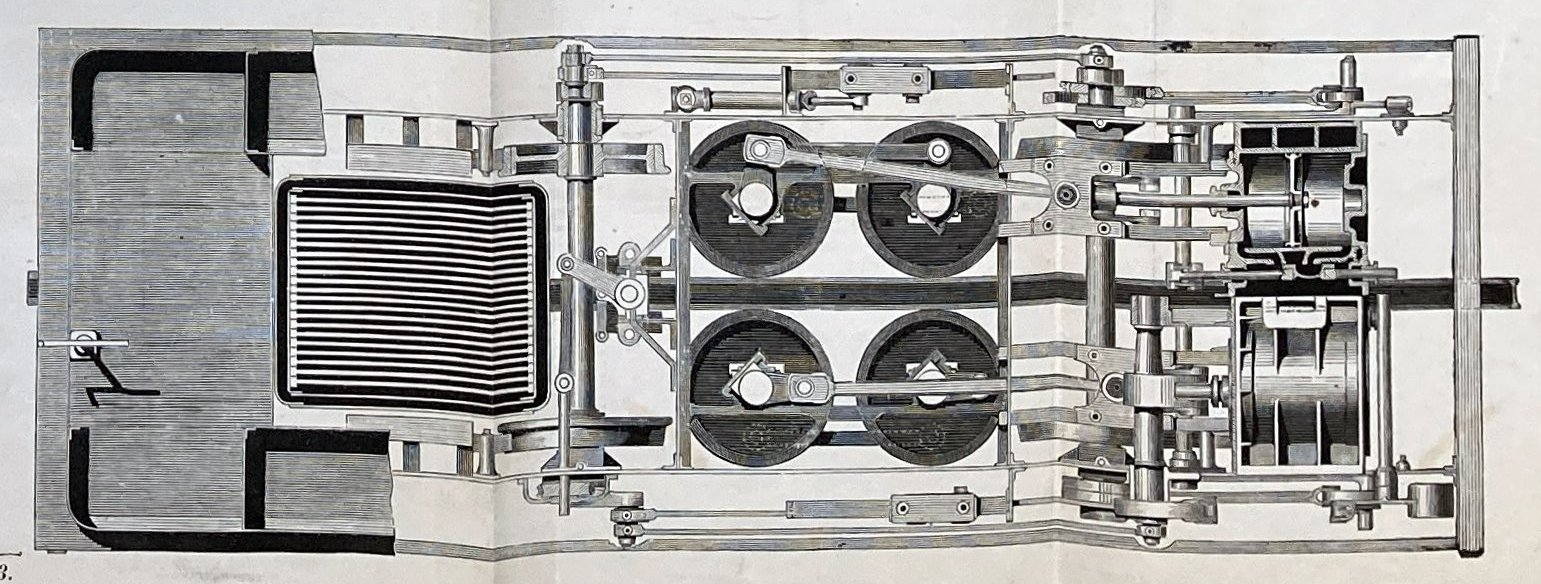
"Cutaway" of Mont Cenis Pass Railway locomotive. One pair of cylinders operated both horizontal and vertical driving wheels.

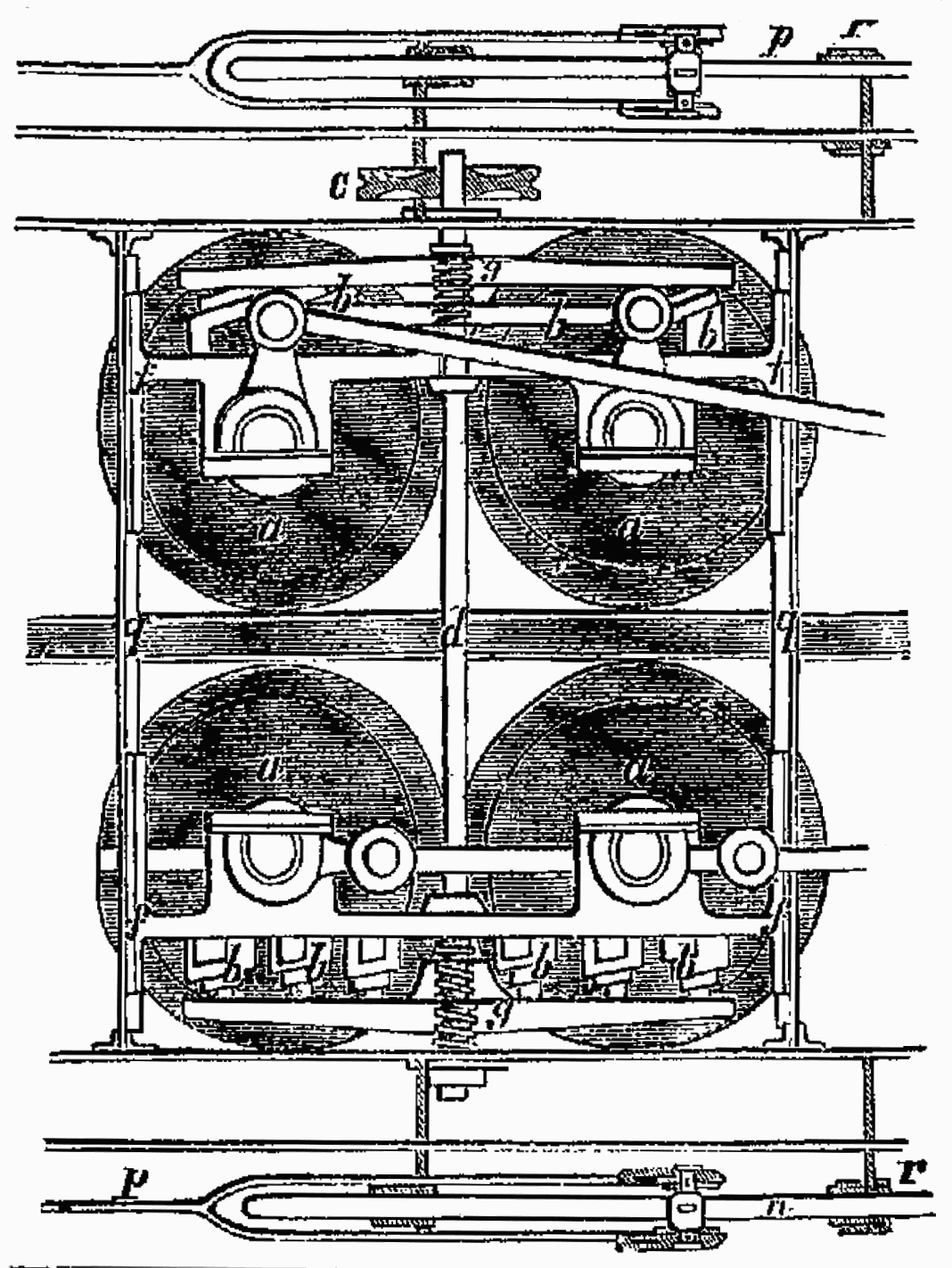
Diagram showing horizontal drive wheels of Cenis Pass locomotive. Volute springs (marked "b") were moved in or out by screw thread "g" operated from the cab by worm drive "c". The horizontal drive wheels "a" moved on slides "f" against the rail.

== History ==
The Fell system was designed, developed and patented by British engineer John Barraclough Fell. (Note: Charles Blacker Vignoles and John Ericsson patented a similar system in 1830, but Fell may not have known of it.) The first test application was alongside the Cromford and High Peak Railway's cable-hauled incline at Whaley Bridge in Derbyshire, England, in 1863 and 1864. The prototype locomotive had separate pairs of cylinders for the horizontal and vertical drive wheels (but this arrangement was simplified in subsequent versions). The outer pair of cylinders (11¾ inches diameter, stroke 18 inches) drove the vertical driving wheels in the usual way. An inner pair of cylinders (11 inches diameter, stroke 10 inches) drove the horizontal wheels. These wheels were forced into contact with the central rail by a horizontal screw thread, controlled by a hand wheel on the footplate, that forced helical springs inwards to press on the vertically aligned journals.

These tests attracted the attention of the French Government, which conducted its own tests on the slopes of Mont Cenis in 1865. As a result, the Mont Cenis Pass Railway was built by a British company as a temporary connection between France and Italy whilst the tunnel under the Alpine pass was being built; shortening the transit time for mail from Britain and France to Italy and beyond.

In 1913 Fell's son George Noble Fell published variations of his father's apparatus using either electric traction or "gaseous fuel". For electric traction the centre rail would also act as the current conductor rail; the horizontal drive wheels would adhere by magnetism, and the brakes would be applied by electromagnets. For the internal combustion version the horizontal guide wheels would be coated with carborundum for improved grip.

== List of Fell railways ==
The following railways have used the Fell system. Of these, the only one still in operation is the electrified Snaefell Mountain Railway on the Isle of Man, which occasionally uses the centre rail for braking only; the cars are all now equipped with rheostatic braking, which meets all normal braking needs. The only surviving Fell locomotive, New Zealand Railways H 199, is preserved at the Fell Locomotive Museum, Featherston, New Zealand, near the site of the Rimutaka Incline.

=== France / Italy ===
- The Mont Cenis Pass Railway over the border to Italy was 77 km (48 mi) long and ran from 1868 until superseded by a tunnel under the pass in 1871. Some characteristics of the Mont Cenis Pass Railway include:
  - 1,100 mm (3 ft 7 5/16 in) gauge – the gauge in English speaking world is sometimes quoted as 3 ft 7 3/8 in
  - Steepest gradient 1 in 12 (8.3%)
  - Gradient where Fell grip system was deemed to be needed 1 in 25 (4.0%)
  - Climb 3,000 feet (914 m)
  - Centre rail 8 in (203 mm) above running rails and about 14 in (356 mm) above sleeper.
  - Sharpest curve 130 feet (40 m)
  - Since there were breaks-of-gauge at each end of the Fell railway, it is not known if ordinary standard gauge rolling stock were needed.
  - Length of line 48 miles (77 km).
  - Length of Fell section 9 miles (14 km)

=== Brazil ===
- The Estrada de Ferro Cantagalo from Niterói to Nova Friburgo opened in 1873. Brazil's first mountain railway, of 1,100 mm (3 ft 7 5/16 in) gauge, re-used some of the equipment from the Mont Cenis Pass Railway, and continued in operation until the 1960s. The Fell centre rail was used only for braking after 1884.

=== Isle of Man ===
- The Snaefell Mountain Railway opened in 1895. It uses electric railcars, with a Fell rail for braking.

=== New Zealand ===
- 1,067 mm (3 ft 6 in)
  - The Rewanui Incline on the West Coast of the South Island used a Fell rail for braking from its opening in 1914 to 1966. It closed in 1985.
  - The Rimutaka Incline on the Wairarapa Line near Featherston in the North Island opened in 1878 and closed in 1955. It was replaced by the Rimutaka tunnel. Unlike the other lines noted, it used the Fell system for propulsion as well as braking throughout its active life. The Fell Engine Museum in Featherston houses the sole preserved Fell locomotive (NZR H class). .
  - The Roa Incline on the West Coast of the South Island used a Fell rail for braking from its opening in 1909. It closed in 1960.
  - The Kaikorai Cable Car which ran from Dunedin to the Kaikorai Valley used an off-centre Fell rail for braking.
- 1,000 mm (3 ft 3 3/8 in)
  - The Wellington Cable Car used a Fell rail for emergency braking from its opening in 1902 until 1978, when it was upgraded.
- unknown gauges
  - Price's Bush Tramway near Akatarawa.
  - Charming Creek Tramway near Ngakawau.
  - Several bush tramways used Fell rails for braking.
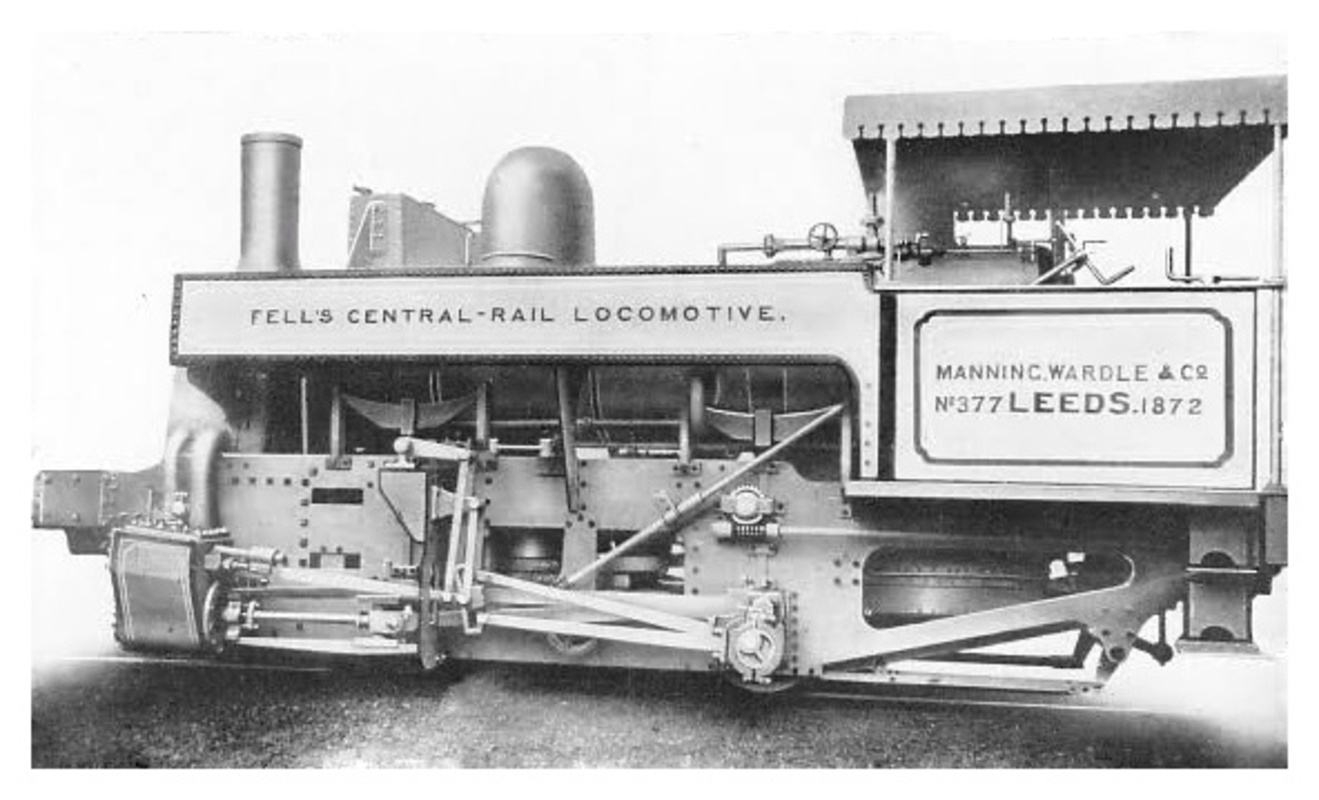
Fell system locomotive built 1876 by Manning Wardle for Estrada de Ferro Cantagalo

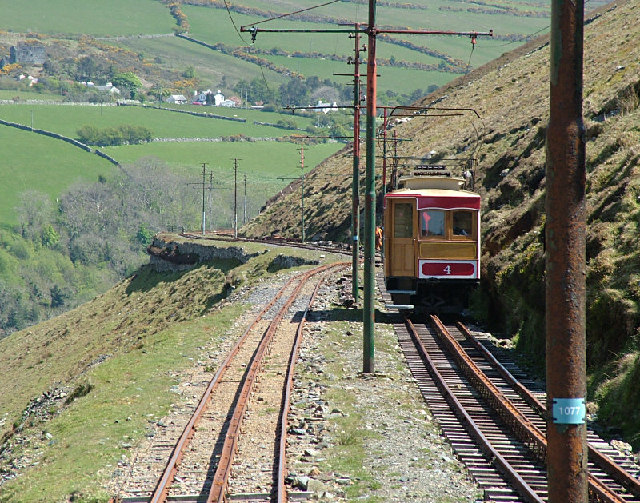
Fell system on the Snaefell Mountain Railway

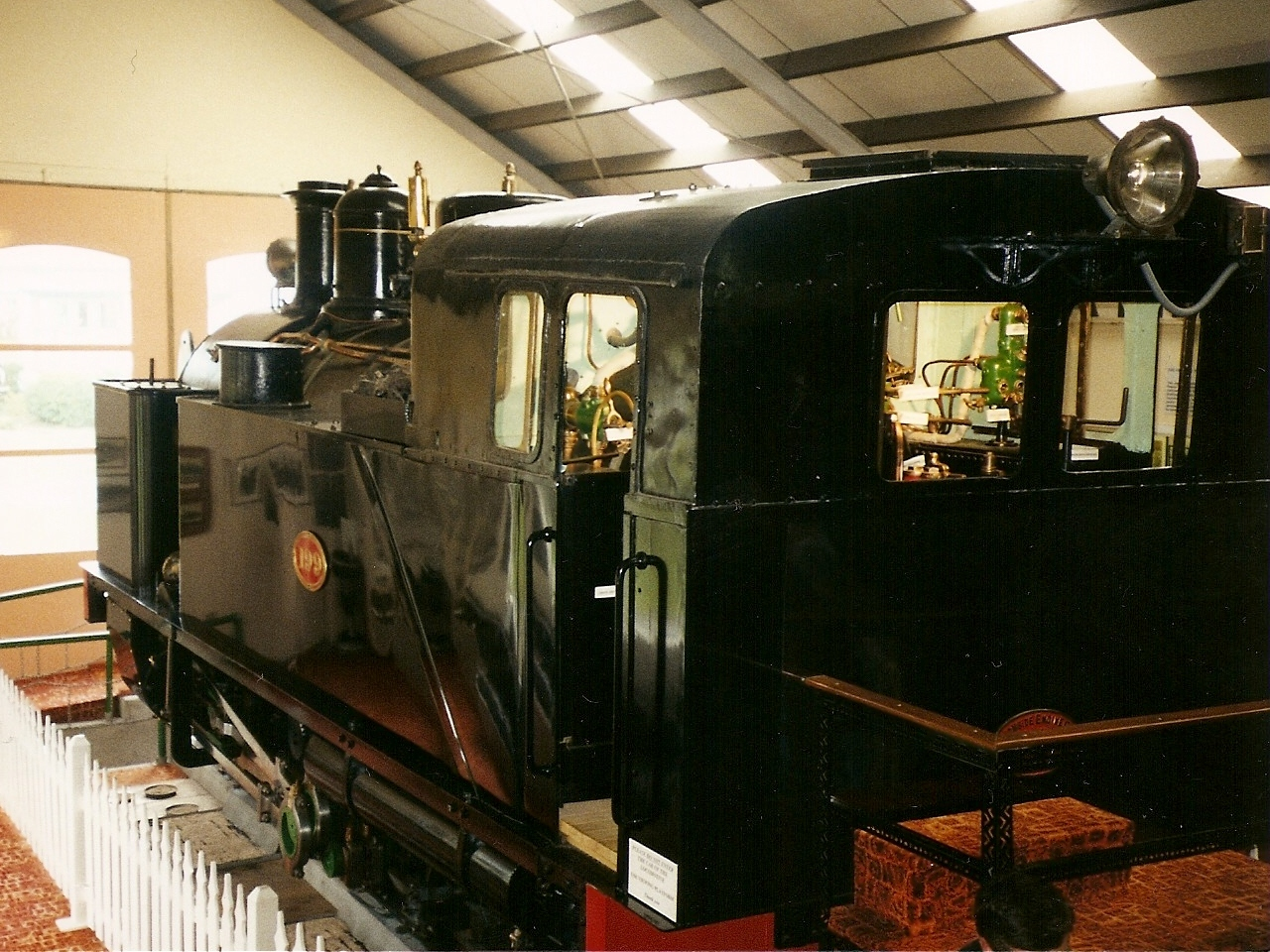
Fell locomotive H199 preserved in the Fell Engine Museum, New Zealand

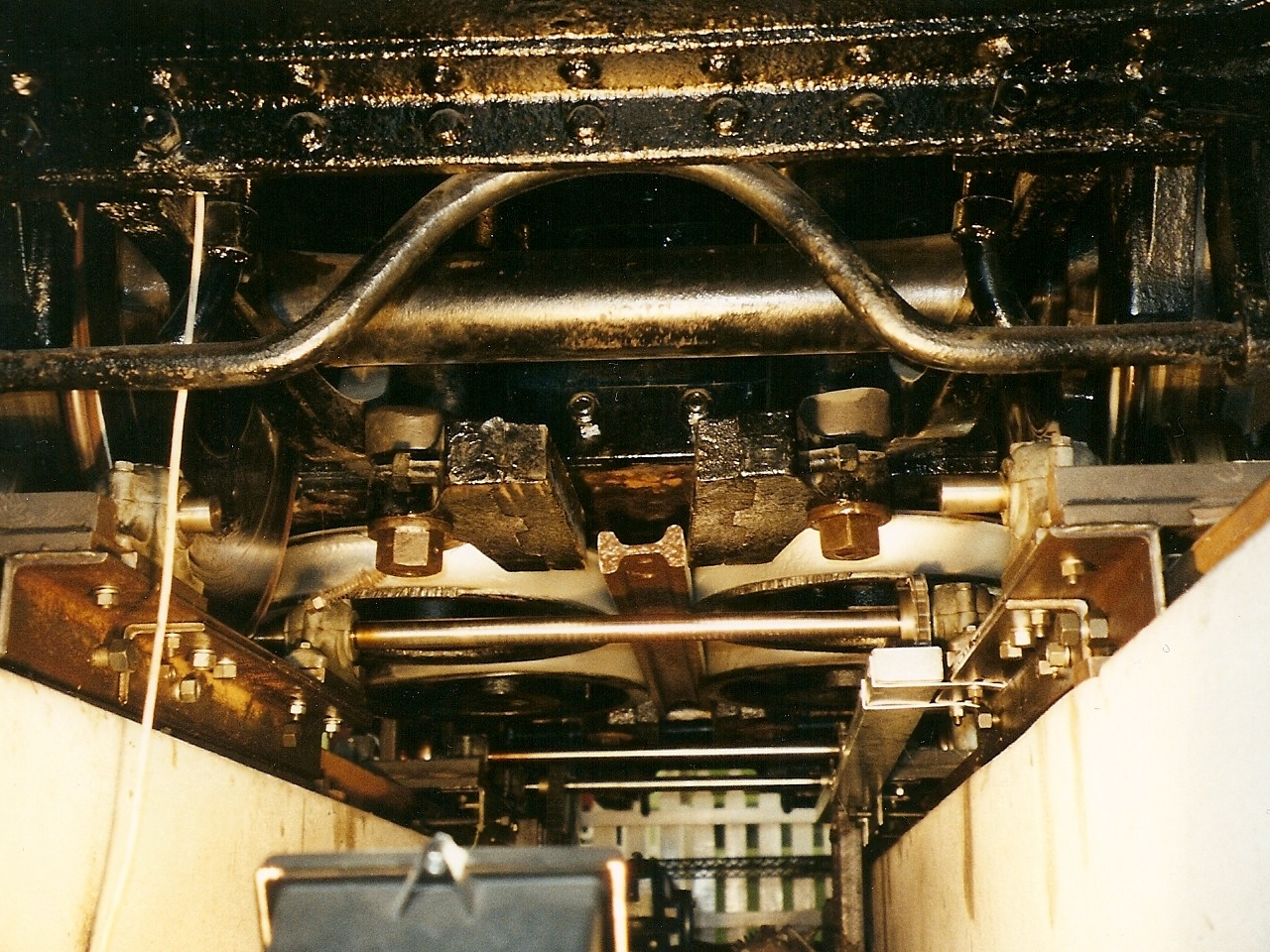
Underside of H199, showing details of the Fell railway system

== See also ==
- Rack railway
- Hanscotte centre-rail system
