= Rewanui Branch =

Overview
- Other name(s): Point Elizabeth Branch
- Status: Closed
- Locale: West Coast, New Zealand
- Termini: Greymouth; Rewanui
- Stations: 4

Service
- Type: Heavy Rail
- System: New Zealand Government Railways (NZGR)
- Operator(s): New Zealand Railways Department

History
- Commenced: 1889
- Opened: 21 January 1914
- Closed: 19 August 1985

Technical
- Line length: 13.07 km (8.12 mi)
- Number of tracks: Single
- Character: Rural
- Track gauge: 3 ft 6 in (1,067 mm)

Map

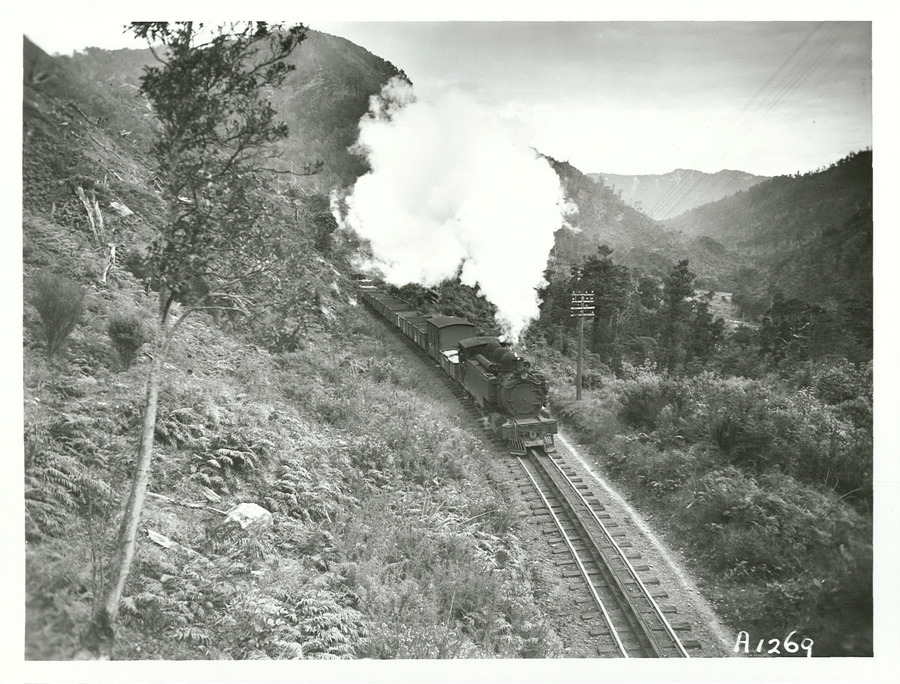
A train on the Rewanui Branch

The Rewanui Branch, sometimes referred to as the Rewanui Incline (Note: This is the name it appears under in David Leitch and Brian Scott, Exploring New Zealand's Ghost Railways, but it is by definition a branch line incorporating an incline.) and known as the Point Elizabeth Branch in its early years, was a branch line railway located in the West Coast region of New Zealand's South Island. It branched from the Midland Line near its western terminus in Greymouth and ran up to Rewanui in the Paparoa Ranges. The branch closed in 1985 but the first six kilometres to Runanga remain in operation as part of the Rapahoe Branch.

== Construction ==
In 1889, the Cobden Railway and Mining Company and Point Elizabeth Coal Company in conjunction began construction of the line, with the original terminus situated in Dunollie. However, a decade later, the joint venture collapsed, and in 1901, the State Mines Department took over the railway operations in conjunction with the mining activity. Operation of the line subsequently passed to the New Zealand Railways Department on 1 December 1904. In comparison to the extension to Rewanui, this section was sedated, with the only significant engineering work being the Cobden Bridge across the Grey River at the start of the branch.

Good coal deposits had been discovered in the Paparoa Ranges, and although the Roa Incline was being built on the other side from a junction with the Stillwater - Westport Line in Ngahere and could carry coal mined from some of the coal seams, a branch up the valley of the Seven Mile Creek was seen as necessary. This line was to be extremely steep: over its 5.4 kilometre length between Dunollie and the terminus, it would rise 163 metres with grades as severe as 1 in 26. This necessitated the installation of a Fell centre rail to assist braking on the descent, though this was not full use of the Fell system like the Rimutaka Incline in the North Island was. The line was opened to its Rewanui terminus on 21 January 1914, with a full length of 13.07 kilometres.

== Operation ==
=== Passenger services ===
Rewanui was inaccessible by road, thus a considerable number of passenger trains operated by the standards of New Zealand branch lines. Although primarily for miners, the trains became minor local tourist attractions in the later years of the line due to the scenic nature of the route. During holiday periods at the mine, special tourist trains were operated, while during regular operations, tourists typically caught the early afternoon service. A number of the regular services acquired nicknames:

- 6:35am Greymouth to Rewanui: "Miner's Train".
- 7:35am Rewanui to Greymouth: "Fanny Train", as it was primarily used by the wives of miners in Rewanui and Dunollie to travel to their own jobs in Greymouth.
- Early afternoon service to Greymouth: The "wet-timer", as miners working in wet parts of the mine had shorter shifts and used this train.
- Sunday to Thursday mixed train that reached Rewanui at 11:30pm: the "Paddy Webb" or "Bob Semple", after the miners who became New Zealand Labour Party government ministers and first organised the service to benefit those miners whose shift began or ended at midnight.

In addition, a bicycle track was located alongside the line for miners working shifts without convenient train service.

=== Freight services ===
Freight traffic was almost exclusively coal. It came from the state-owned Liverpool Mine, for which the line was expressly built, as well as from a number of nearby privately owned mines.

=== Motive power ===
Motive power had to be specially modified to work on the Rewanui Branch past Dunollie. In the steam era, motive power came primarily from the three members of the W^{E} class. In 1902, two members of the B class of tender locomotives were converted into W^{E} class tank locomotives for work on the Rimutaka Incline. One, W^{E} 377, was transferred south at the time of the Incline's opening, followed by W^{E} 376 in 1927. The third W^{E}, 375, was not converted from the B class until 1943. W and W^{A} class locomotives sometimes hauled light trains on the Incline, and in the 1960s, three members of the W^{W} class were modified to work to Rewanui. After extra brakes were fitted to the three W^{W}s and W^{E} 375, the Fell centre rail was removed in 1966 and only those four engines were permitted to run to Rewanui.

In June 1969, diesel locomotives fitted with modified brakes took over from the steam locomotives. These were primarily of the DJ class, but DSC class shunters operated some services. These locomotives worked the line through to its closure.

One quirk of the line's motive power was a Land Rover converted to run on rails. It was based in Rewanui from May 1960 and functioned as an ambulance. Previously, miners who were injured had to travel down the Incline in a specially modified "gravity powered" wagon.

==== Fell Vans ====
Special fell brake vans were used on the Rewanui Incline between Dunollie and Rewanui. Six vans were built with three being allocated for use on the Rewanui incline and the other three on the Roa Incline. They were similar in design to the vans used on the Rimutaka Incline, over the Wairarapa Ranges, but had no duckets, and instead, had windows at either end. The chassis and brake gear, however, remained the same. With the closure of the Rimutaka Incline in 1955, surplus vans were transferred to Greymouth for use on the Rewanui and Roa Inclines.

== Closure ==
In the early 1980s, the Liverpool Mine was becoming an increasingly uneconomic mine to run. The line thus came to an abrupt end when the decision was taken to close the mine in 1984. That year, in October, the line was ruled unfit for passenger service, and all scheduled services – both passenger and freight – were cancelled on 5 November 1984. Occasional freight services continued to operate until May 1985, when the last train departed Rewanui with a load of coal from a nearby private mine. The line was formally closed on 19 August 1985 from the junction with the Rapahoe Branch, which absorbed the six kilometres to Greymouth and remains in use. Trains run when required to Rapahoe.

== Today ==
The Runanga-Rewanui line is one of the most accessible closed railway lines in New Zealand, as the former railway route has been converted into a road to Rewanui. However, due to operations by the Spring Creek Mine, the road is inaccessible to vehicles. It is possible to walk or cycle to Rewanui. A local committee exists to preserve the Rewanui area as a historic site, but a landslide in 1988 killed the caretaker and destroyed bridges and some buildings. Many remnants have been long destroyed but the coal loading bin, some L and Q class wagons, two-foot gauge coal tubs and the engineer's workshop survive. A plaque has been placed on a stone at the summit as a memorial.
