= A. L. Beattie =

New Zealand engineer (1852–1920)

Alfred Luther Beattie JP (1852 – 2 May 1920), typically referred to as A. L. Beattie, was a pioneering locomotive engineer. Born in Yorkshire, England, he gained fame as the Chief Mechanical Engineer of the New Zealand Railways Department (NZR) between 1900 and 1913. During this time, Beattie designed the Q class, the first 4-6-2 (Pacific) steam locomotive class in the world, and he was also one of the earliest people to use other wheel arrangements.

== Early life ==
Born in 1852, his birth was registered in Hunslet as Alfred Luther Betty. He arrived in New Zealand at Port Chalmers in 1876, when he joined NZR. In February 1897, Beattie was given the position of Locomotive Engineer at Addington Workshops in Christchurch. Unlike in some countries, where "locomotive engineer" is the title of regular train drivers, the title in New Zealand then referred to a specific position that oversaw the design and construction of new steam locomotives and the maintenance and enhancement of existing locomotives.

== Career as Engineer ==
In April 1900, the Chief Mechanical Engineer, Thomas Forth Rotheram, left NZR to work for the Western Australian Government Railways and was succeeded by Beattie. When Beattie was appointed to the position, the title was "Locomotive Superintendent", but it was restyled as Chief Mechanical Engineer early in his term, between July 1901 and April 1902. During his time in the role, Beattie designed a number of innovative and original locomotives. He retired after holding the position for 13 years and was succeeded by Henry Hughlings Jackson on 13 October 1913.

=== The Q class ===
Beattie was almost instantly faced with a problem upon appointment as Chief Mechanical Engineer: New Zealand's railway network was expanding, traffic volumes were growing, faster speeds were required, and accordingly, a more powerful type of locomotive was required. Furthermore, although this new class was to haul the heaviest and fastest expresses, it was to burn low grade lignite coal from Canterbury and Otago. Baldwin Locomotive Works recommended a camelback design to solve the problem, but Beattie conceived the idea of an enhanced 4-6-0 U^{B} class locomotive with a two-wheel trailing truck to support a wide Wootten firebox. This created a 4-6-2 wheel arrangement under Whyte notation, and an order was placed with Baldwin for thirteen locomotives to Beattie's specifications in 1901. These locomotives became the Q class, and the first entered service on 24 December 1901 after being shipped across the Pacific Ocean. This voyage led to the 4-6-2 arrangement being nicknamed the Pacific type, and it became a popular arrangement worldwide.

=== The A class ===
Described as the "triumph of Beattie's term in office", the A class was designed in 1905 for service on the Main South Line and the nearly-complete North Island Main Trunk Railway. It was a further development of the Q class and earlier 4-6-0 designs such as the U class, seeking to rectify faults with those designs and improve efficiency and hauling power. Beattie created the initial design before passing it on to Chief Draughtsman G. A. Pearson to complete, and when the first members of the A class entered service in 1906, they were considered to be the country's most handsome locomotives.

=== The X class ===
After pioneering the Pacific wheel arrangement, Beattie went on to pioneer the 4-8-2 Mountain type. The A class locomotives were not sufficiently powerful to tackle the steep grades on the North Island Main Trunk, and Beattie's solution was the 4-8-2 X class. Designed in 1908 for the opening of the Trunk, the first of eighteen Xs entered service on 9 January 1909, and they were some of the largest and most powerful locomotives in New Zealand.

=== Other locomotives ===
Beattie introduced a number of other classes during his term, though none so notable as the A, Q and X classes. These included tank locomotives such as 1903's W^{F} class, 1910's W^{G} class, and 1913's W^{W} class. Beattie was also one of, if not the, first to employ the 4-6-4T arrangement – the 1902 conversions of three B class locomotives into the W^{E} class and the W^{G} and W^{W} are some of the earliest examples in the world of the 4-6-4T arrangement.
