= WG class =

WG class or Class WG may refer to:

- Indian locomotive class WG, 2-8-2 steam locomotives
- NZR WG class, 4-6-4T steam locomotives
