= NZR WW class =

Class of 50 (+14) New Zealand 4-6-4T locomotives

NZR W^{W} class
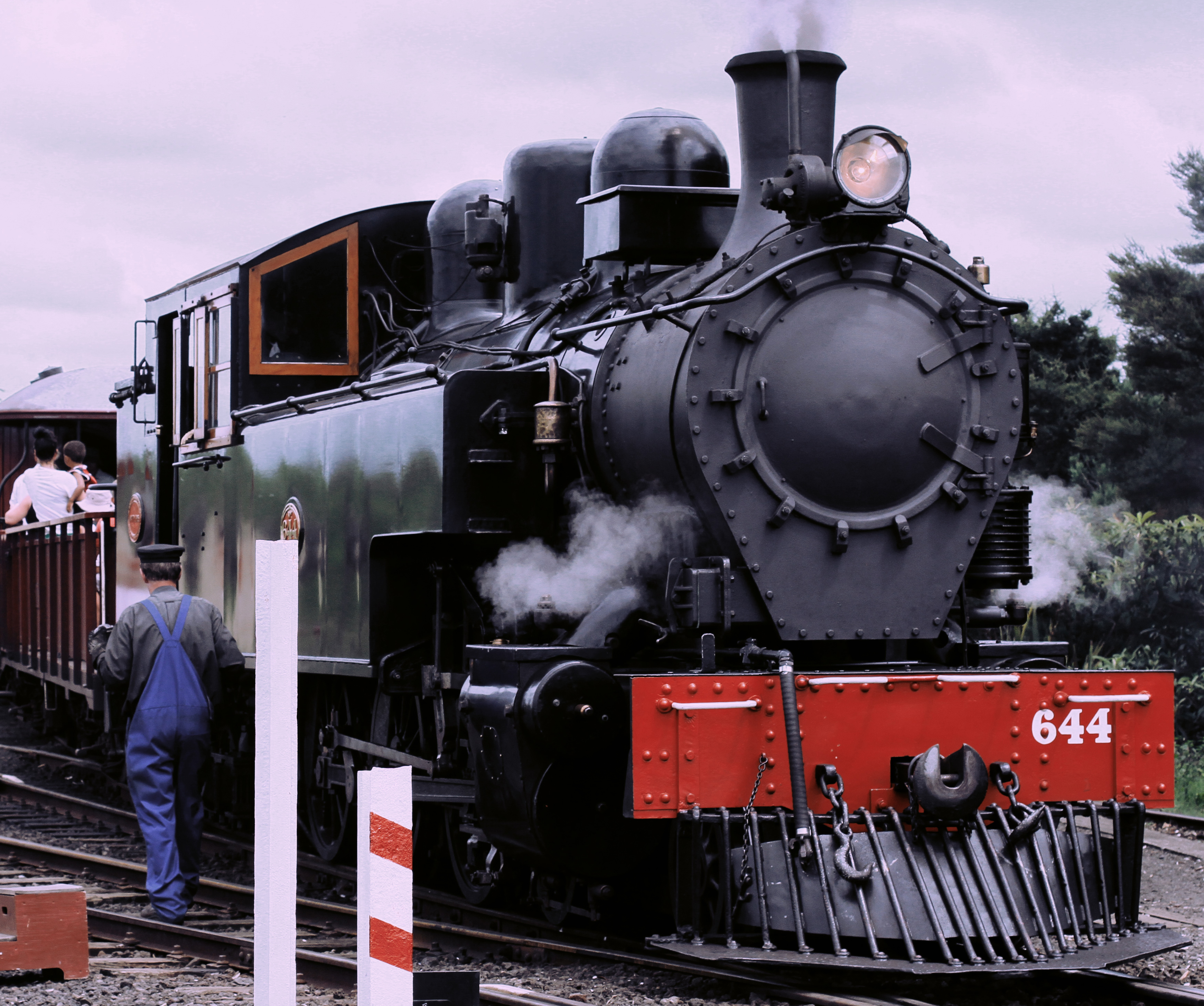
- W^{W} 644 as preserved on the Glenbrook Vintage Railway on 13 February 2011
Type and origin
- Power type: Steam
- Designer: A. L. Beattie
- Builder: NZGR Hillside Workshops (50), Hutt Workshops (14)
- Build date: 1913-1919
- Total produced: 50 built new, 14 rebuilt from W^{G} class at Hutt Workshops
- Rebuilder: NZR Hutt Workshops, Hillside Workshops
- Rebuild date: 1940-42,1950-60
- Number rebuilt: 14 (from W^{G} class), 12 (from W^{W} class)
Specifications
- Configuration
  - Whyte: 4-6-4T
- Gauge: 3 ft 6 in (1,067 mm)
- Driver dia.: 45 in (1.143 m)
- Wheelbase: 29 ft 7.5 in (9.03 m)
- Length: 36 ft 11.5 in (11.26 m)
- Adhesive weight: 29.7 long tons (30.2 t; 33.3 short tons)
- Loco weight: 51.5 long tons (52.3 tonnes; 57.7 short tons)
- Fuel type: Coal
- Fuel capacity: 2 tons
- Water cap.: 1,370 imp gal (6,200 L)
- Firebox
  - Grate area: 16.9 sq ft (1.57 m^{2})
- Boiler pressure: 180 lbf/in^{2} (1,241 kPa)
- Heating surface: 526 sq ft (48.9 m^{2})
- Superheater: NZR
- Cylinders: Two, outside
- Cylinder size: 15.5 in × 22 in (394 mm × 559 mm)
- Valve gear: Walschaerts
- Valve type: Slide valves (W^{W} 565), piston valves (all locomotives)
- Train brakes: Westinghouse compressed air
Performance figures
- Tractive effort: 16,910 lbf (75.22 kN)
Career
- Operators: NZR
- Number in class: 51
- Numbers: 131, 449, 479-482, 486, 488-496, 556-561, 562 (later 667), 563-575, 638-647, 668-685
- Nicknames: "Bobtails"
- Locale: All of New Zealand
- Delivered: 1913
- Withdrawn: 1969
- Preserved: 4
- Disposition: Withdrawn, four preserved

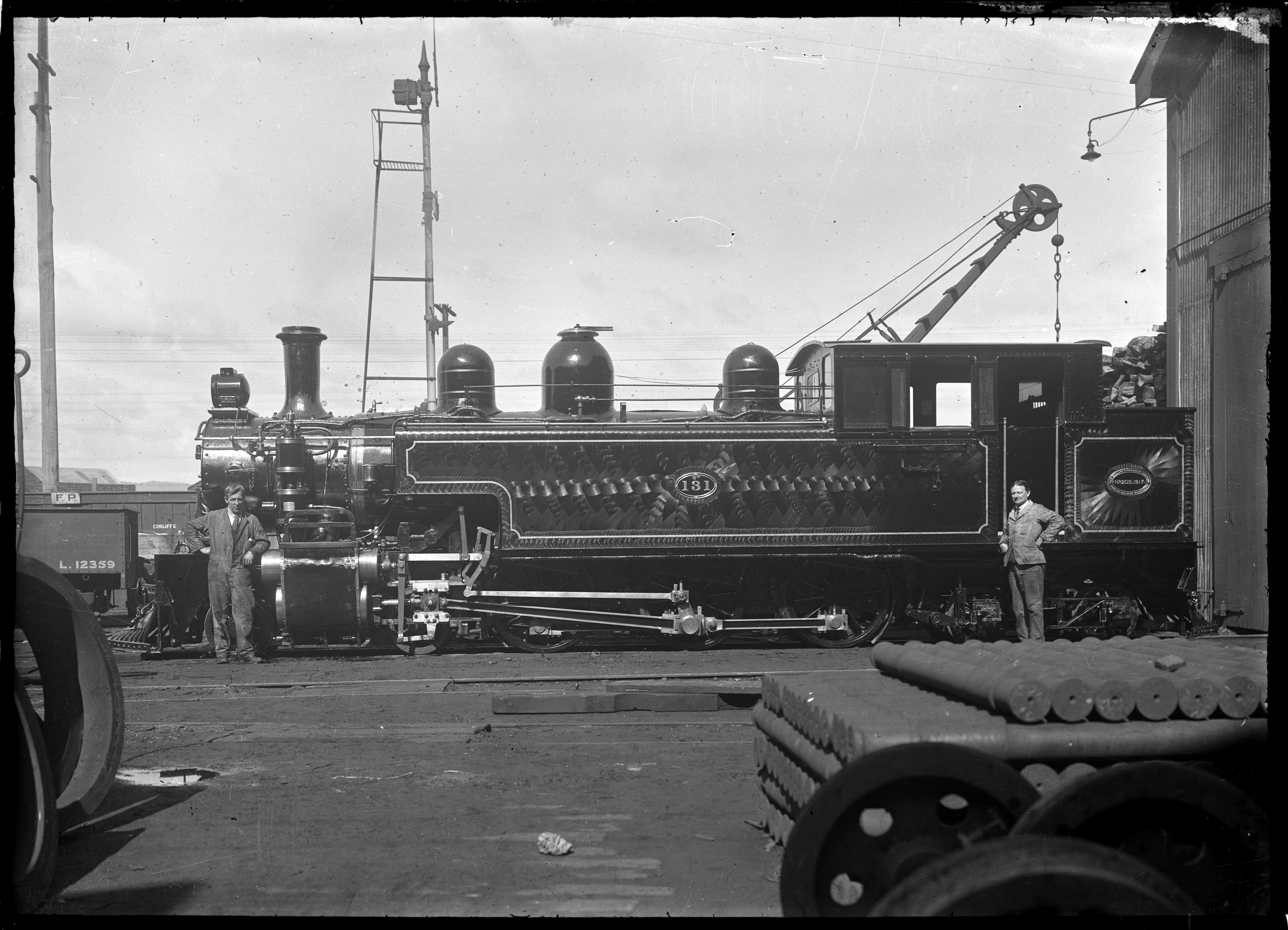
Ww Class steam locomotive NZR 131, 4-6-4T, Petone Workshops

The NZR W^{W} class was a class of 4-6-4T tank locomotives that operated on the New Zealand national railway network. They were built for New Zealand Railways Department (NZR), and were the final development of the six-coupled tank engine in New Zealand, the penultimate class of tank locomotives to be built for NZR, and the first class of tank locomotives to be built with superheaters.

== Introduction ==
The W^{W} class were based on the earlier W^{G} class 4-6-4T tank locomotives, but with a reduced boiler pressure of 180psi and larger cylinders. The initial batch comprising locomotives W^{W} 556-575 were built at Hillside Workshops in 1913, and initially carried the W^{G} classification before being reclassified as the W^{W} class, the 'W' indicating that these locomotives were intended for suburban work in Wellington.

Following the success of the first 20 locomotives, Hillside delivered a further 30 locomotives, which were classified W^{W} from new. A further 14 locomotives were rebuilt from the W^{G} class at Hutt Workshops in two batches between 1940–42 and 1950-52.

Although most of the class were built with piston valves, W^{W} 565 was delivered with slide valves, which were not suited to superheated steam, leading to their replacement with standard piston valves.

== In service ==
The W^{W} class demonstrated to be extremely versatile in service, being capable of handling almost any task. Initially both Auckland and Wellington received allocations of these locomotives which were used in suburban passenger service and occasionally on goods work; later allocations saw engines of this class allocated to the West Coast at Westport and Greymouth. Here, the locomotives worked mostly on coal trains and occasionally hauled branch line passenger services.

During the early 1950s, the decision was made to fit new higher-pitched boilers with deeper fireboxes to four W^{G} class locomotives, Nos. 479, 480, 486 and 488, as a trial when they were rebuilt to W^{W} class specifications. This required a new type of smokebox saddle, cab and enlarged coal bunker. This alteration was deemed to be successful, adding an extra 100 sq. ft. of heating surface; rather than rebuild the remaining six W^{G}s due to the poor condition of their frames, NZR decided to rebuild 12 existing W^{W} class locomotives, Nos. 571, 573-575, 644, 669, 672, 678-680, 683-684.

During the early 1960s, several of the W^{W} class locomotives transferred from the North Island to Greymouth on the West Coast were altered to operate on the Rewanui Incline by the provision of 'trap-door' cowcatchers to clear the centre rail and additional air reservoirs on the tops of the side tanks. Following the removal of the centre rail in 1966, the locomotives' extra reservoirs were removed and the original brake pump was replaced by two larger pumps, one on each side of the smokebox.

== Withdrawal ==
The first member of the W^{W} class to be withdrawn was W^{W} 491, which was withdrawn from service in August 1955 for use as a sectionalised aid for apprentice training at Otahuhu Workshops. A further 43 locomotives were withdrawn by the first half of the 1960s, by which time the remaining 21 locomotives were in service in Auckland and on the West Coast. Further withdrawals were at a slower pace, with a final seven locomotives still in service on the West Coast at the beginning of 1969.

== Preservation ==
Four W^{W} class locomotives have been preserved, all in the North Island of New Zealand. Three were rebuilt with higher-pitched boilers while the fourth retains its original low-pitched boiler:

- W^{W} 480/GVR No.1 (Hillside 104 of 1910) was originally built as a W^{G} class locomotive in 1910 and was rebuilt as a W^{W} class locomotive with larger cylinders and a higher-pitched boiler in 1951. Withdrawn from service in June 1969, the locomotive was purchased by the Railway Enthusiasts Society for use on their Glenbrook Vintage Railway and ran from Greymouth to Auckland under its own steam. After being overhauled the locomotive was renumbered to GVR N^{O} 1 and had its original identity restored in 2002. W^{W} 480 was withdrawn from service in 2010 and was overhauled at the GVR's Pukeoware workshops, returning to service in March 2013. The locomotive was later withdrawn from service in May 2013 for a boiler overhaul, which was completed in 2018. 480 is currently in service at the GVR.
- W^{W} 491 (Hillside 116 of 1912) was originally built as a W^{G} class locomotive in 1910 and was rebuilt as a W^{W} class locomotive in 1941. Withdrawn in 1955, the locomotive was moved to the Otahuhu Workshops where it was sectionalised as an aid for apprentice training. The remains of W^{W} 491 were donated to MOTAT in 1975, where it remains on static display although its restoration has been stated as a long-term objective. W^{W} 491 is the only member of its class preserved to retain its original low-pitched boiler.
- W^{W} 571 (Hillside 147 of 1914) was built as a W^{W} class locomotive in 1914, and rebuilt with a higher-pitched boiler in July 1956 before it was transferred from Wellington to Westport. Retired from Greymouth in 1969, W^{W} 571 was sold to the New Zealand Railway and Locomotive Society Wellington Branch for preservation and ran to Wellington under its own steam later that year. W^{W} 571 is now based on the Silver Stream Railway and is stored pending overhaul.
- W^{W} 644/GVR No.2 (Hillside 179 of 1915) was built as a W^{W} class locomotive in 1915, and rebuilt with a higher-pitched boiler in July 1953. Withdrawn by NZR at Greymouth in 1969, the locomotive was sold to the Railway Enthusiasts Society in April 1970 and ran to Auckland under its own steam. Dismantled for overhaul, W^{W} 644 was renumbered as GVR N^{O} 2. The locomotive was stored in a dismantled state until 2002 when its overhaul was restarted and was restored to working order in 2007 as W^{W} 644. 644 was recently overhauled and is now certified for the national railway network.

In addition, Steam Incorporated also owned an original low-pitched W^{W} boiler which had originally been fitted to W^{W} 646. This boiler was purchased for industrial use at the Ford Motor Company plant in the Hutt Valley in the 1970s and was stored at Paekakariki until early 2015 when it was sold to MOTAT to aid the future restoration of W^{W} 491.

== See also ==
- NZR W class
- NZR W^{A} class
- NZR W^{B} class
- NZR W^{D} class
- NZR W^{E} class
- NZR W^{F} class
- NZR W^{G} class
- NZR W^{S} / W^{AB} class
- Locomotives of New Zealand
