= NZR WD class =

NZR W^{D} class
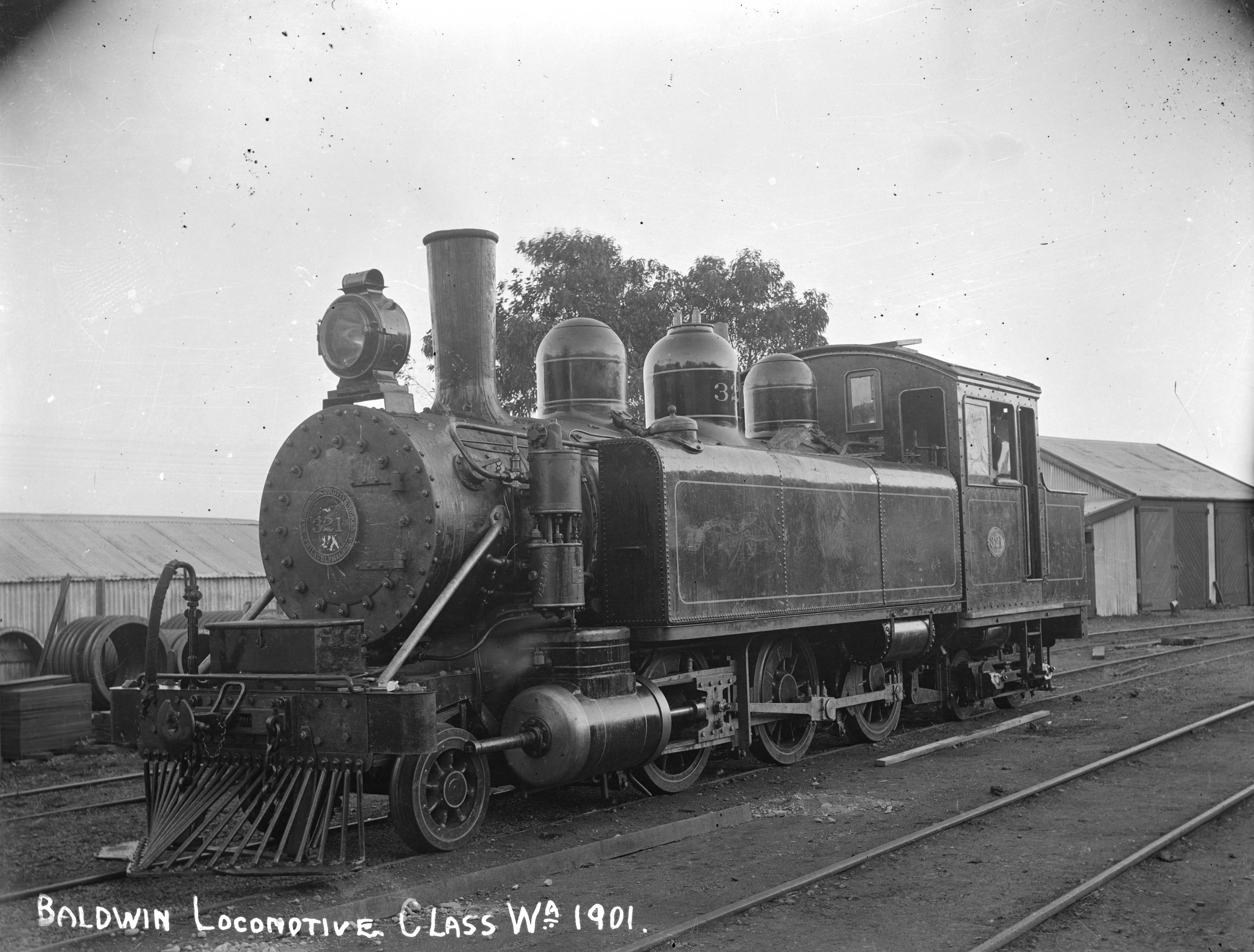
- WD no. 321 steam locomotive (2-6-4T type). Godber Collection, Alexander Turnbull Library.
Type and origin
- Power type: Steam
- Builder: Baldwin Locomotive Works, Philadelphia, United States
- Serial number: 18543 – 18554; 19259 – 19264
- Build date: 1901
- Total produced: 18
Specifications
- Configuration
  - Whyte: 2-6-4T
- Gauge: 3 ft 6 in (1,067 mm)
- Driver dia.: 39.75 in (1.010 m)
- Wheelbase: 27 ft 7 in (8.41 m)
- Length: 34 ft 9 in (10.59 m)
- Adhesive weight: 29.2 long tons (29.7 t; 32.7 short tons)
- Loco weight: 43.7 long tons (44.4 t; 48.9 short tons)
- Fuel type: Coal
- Fuel capacity: 2.7 long tons (2.7 t; 3.0 short tons)
- Water cap.: 900 imp gal (4,100 L; 1,100 US gal)
- Firebox
  - Grate area: 17.7 square feet (1.64 m^{2})
- Boiler pressure: 200 psi (1,379 kPa)
- Heating surface: 837 square feet (77.8 m^{2})
- Cylinders: Two
- Cylinder size: 14 in × 20 in (356 mm × 508 mm)
Performance figures
- Tractive effort: 15,780 lbf (70.2 kN)
Career
- Number in class: 18
- Numbers: 316 – 327; 355 – 360
- Locale: All of New Zealand
- First run: 24 May 1901
- Last run: March 1936 (for NZR); 1960 (for private companies)
- Retired: 1933 – 1960
- Preserved: Two (W^{D}'s 356 & 357)
- Current owner: Baldwin Steam Trust, Canterbury Railway Society (1)
- Disposition: 16 scrapped 2 preserved

The NZR W^{D} class was a class of tank locomotive built by Baldwin Locomotive Works to operate on New Zealand's national rail network.

Essentially a more advanced version of 1898's W^{B} class, the eighteen members of the W^{D} class were ordered in 1901 and most entered service that year, though three were not introduced until the start of 1902. Based in locations all around the country, from Auckland in the north to Dunedin in the south, the W^{D} class were suitable for a variety of trains from freight to suburban passenger services. Withdrawal of the class began with W^{D} 356 in January 1933, with the final three, 327, 359, and 360, written off in March 1936. A number were not actually scrapped or dumped but were sold to work on private industrial lines.

== Industrial use ==
Although designed as a large suburban tank locomotive, four W^{D} class locomotives were sold for industrial use after withdrawal by NZR. W^{D} 316 and W^{D} 356 were sold in April 1934 and January 1933 to Wilton Collieries Ltd. for use on their private line between Ngauruwahia and Glen Massey; both were listed as unserviceable by 1935 and were sold for scrap. W^{D} 317 was sold in December 1934 to the Ohai Railway Board for use on their private railway between Ohai and Wairio. This locomotive remained in working order up until 1944, when it was placed in storage and scrapped in 1952.

W^{D} 357 was withdrawn in March 1935 and placed in storage before it was sold to the Timaru Harbour Board in 1938. It remained in use at Timaru until 1964, when it was donated to the New Zealand Railway and Locomotive Society's Canterbury Branch for preservation on the Ferrymead Railway.

== Preservation ==
W^{D} 357, preserved at Ferrymead Railway, is still fitted with its original boiler and is currently in storage pending overhaul to working order.

During the 1990s, the remains of W^{D} 356 were discovered at Konini, near Pahiatua. It had been dumped for erosion protection during World War II; the frames of the locomotive had been separated into three sections, comprising the front, centre and trailing sections and buried along the riverbank. The front and centre sections were salvaged by Hugh McCracken and moved to Steam Incorporated's depot at Paekakariki. The remains of the locomotive were moved to the Rimutaka Incline Railway Heritage Trust's workshops at Maymorn in 2006, pending restoration.

== See also ==
- NZR W class
- NZR W^{A} class
- NZR W^{B} class
- NZR W^{E} class
- NZR W^{F} class
- NZR W^{G} class
- NZR W^{W} class
- NZR W^{S} / W^{AB} class
- Locomotives of New Zealand
