= NZR WE class =

Class of New Zealand 4-6-4T locomotives

NZR W^{E} class
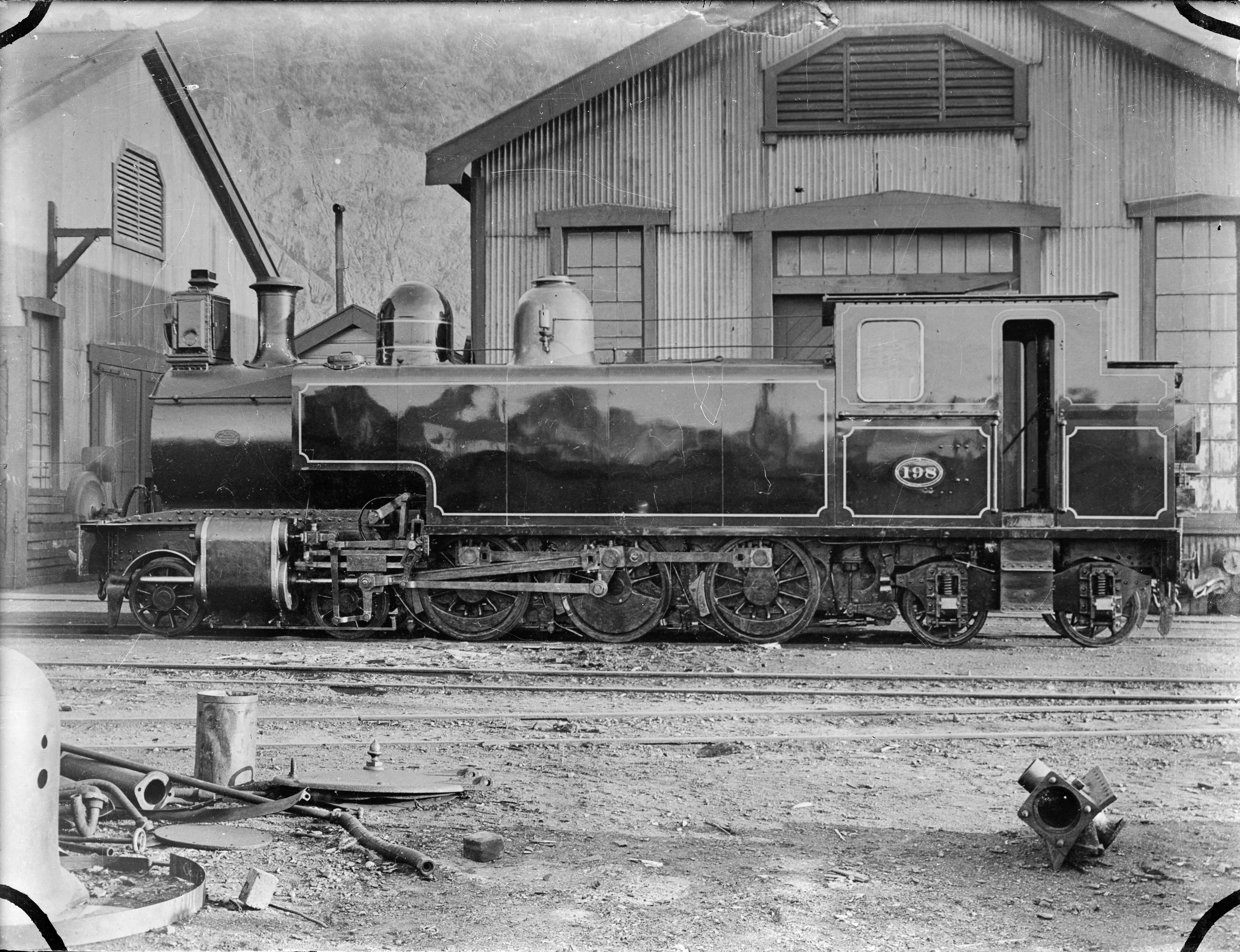
- W^{E} class No. 198
Type and origin
- Power type: Steam
- Builder: NZGR Addington Workshops
- Build date: 1902, 1943
- Total produced: 3
Specifications
- Configuration
  - Whyte: 4-6-4T
- Gauge: 3 ft 6 in (1,067 mm)
- Driver dia.: 42.5 in (1.080 m)
- Adhesive weight: 35 long tons (36 t)
- Loco weight: 55.2 long tons (56.1 tonnes; 61.8 short tons)
- Fuel type: Coal
- Firebox
  - Grate area: 17.5 sq ft (1.63 m^{2})
- Boiler pressure: 180 lbf/in^{2} (1,241 kPa)
- Heating surface: 1,037 sq ft (96.3 m^{2})
- Cylinders: Two, outside
- Cylinder size: 16 in × 22 in (406 mm × 559 mm)
Performance figures
- Tractive effort: 15,780 lbf (70.19 kN)
Career
- Operators: NZR
- Locale: West Coast
- Withdrawn: 1964-1969
- Disposition: Withdrawn, Scrapped

The NZR W^{E} Class were rebuilt from earlier Sharp Stewart built B class locomotives. In service, the first two were tried on the Rimutaka Incline, however, they lacked the required adhesion on the 1 in 15 (6.67%) grade. They were later transferred to Greymouth for use on the Rewanui Incline, where they were far more successful, on the railway line's 1 in 25 (4%) grade. It is not known if they ever operated on the Roa Incline.

The three We class locomotives lasted until 1964 with the last ones withdrawn from service in 1969.

== See also ==
- NZR W class
- NZR W^{A} class
- NZR W^{B} class
- NZR W^{D} class
- NZR W^{F} class
- NZR W^{G} class
- NZR W^{W} class
- NZR W^{S} / W^{AB} class
- Locomotives of New Zealand
