= Blackball Branch =

Branch line railway on the West Coast, New Zealand

Map

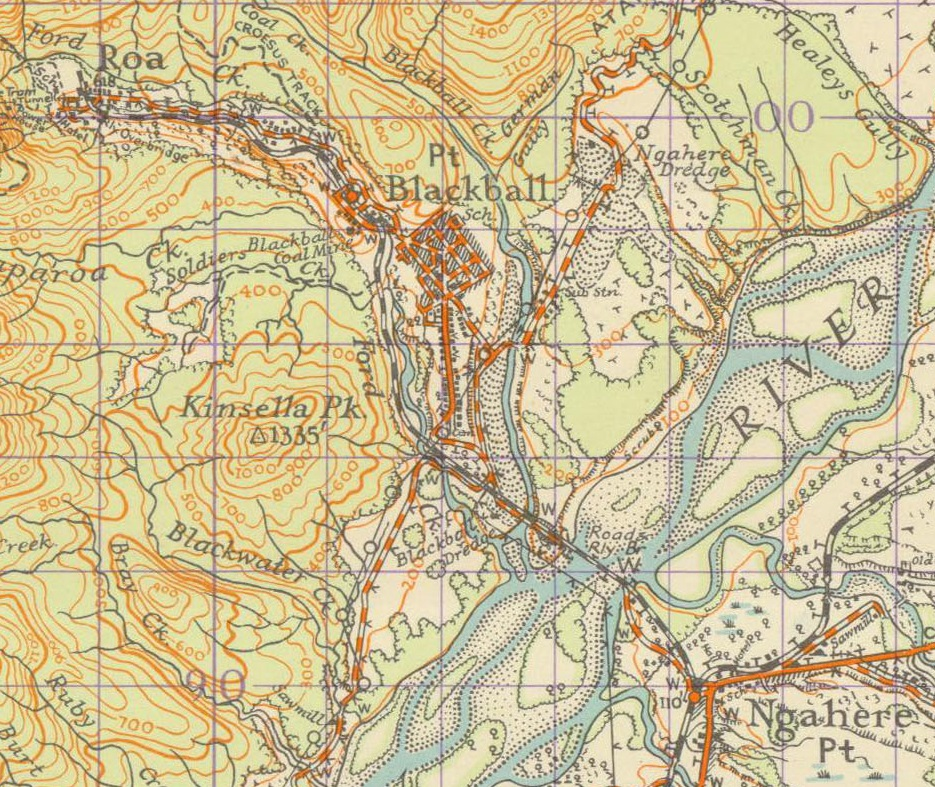
1944 one inch to one mile map sheet S44 showing route from Ngahere via Blackball to Roa. Source: Land Information New Zealand (LINZ) and licensed by LINZ for re-use under the Creative Commons Attribution 3.0 New Zealand licence.

The Blackball Branch was a branch line railway of New Zealand's national rail network on the West Coast of the South Island and was operational from the 1900s to 1966. It included the Roa Branch, also known as the Roa Incline. Roa was sometimes known as Paparoa.

== Construction ==
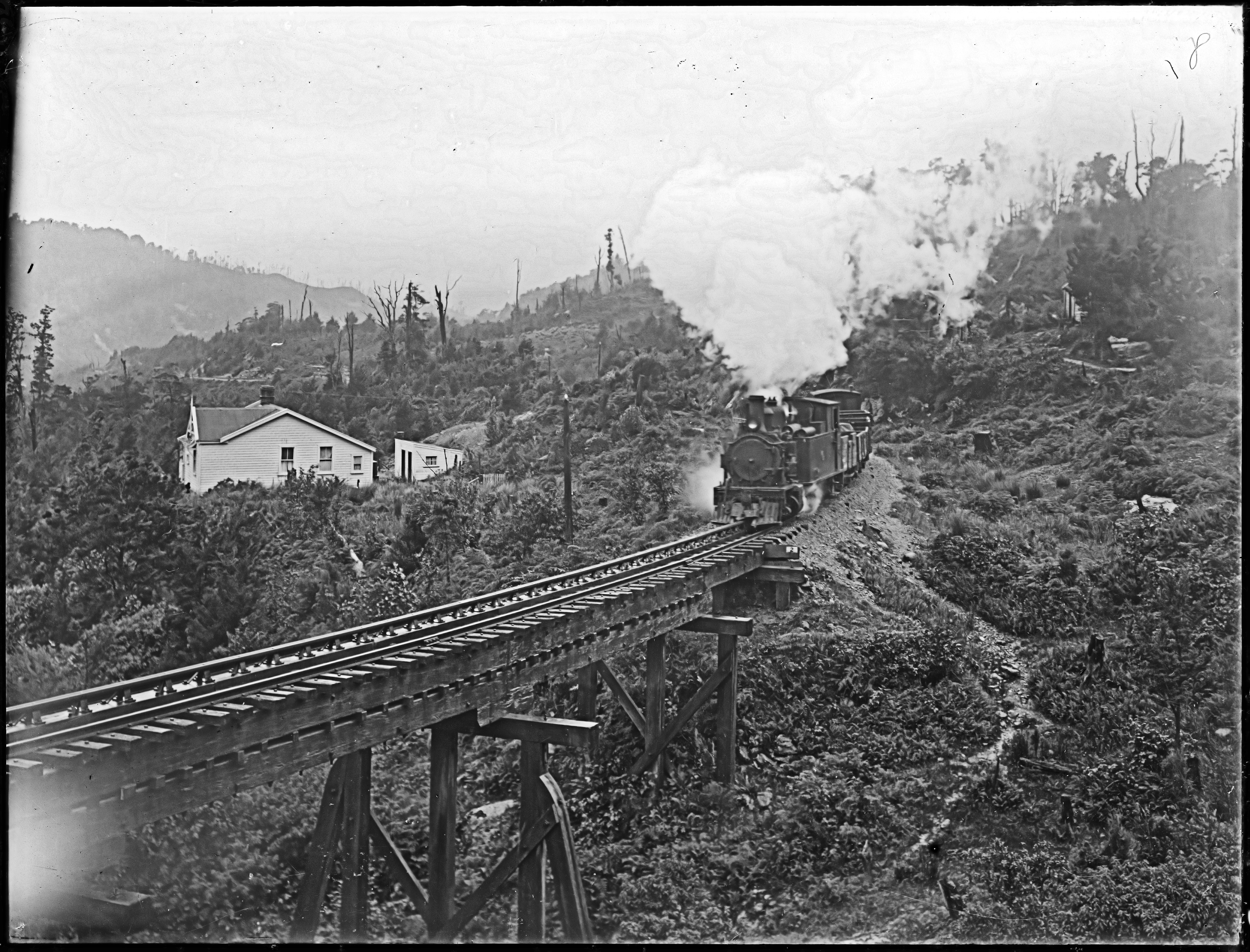
Locomotive on the railway line between Blackball and Roa, circa 1940s-1950s, showing the centre rail. The Press (Newspaper) :Negatives. Ref: 1/1-009750-G. Alexander Turnbull Library, Wellington.

The Blackball Coal Company's mine near Blackball was on the opposite side of the Grey River to the Stillwater - Westport Line, and in the late 19th century an aerial cableway was used to transport coal from the mine across the river to a railway station in Ngahere. This did not prove to be as efficient or desirable as a railway, so in 1901 a branch line across the Grey River from Ngahere to Blackball was approved.

The Public Works Department began building the 5.5-kilometre (3.4 mi) line in 1902, but it was plagued with difficulties. Construction of the Grey River bridge suffered from delays, a contractor for a trestle bridge further along the line went bankrupt, and torrential rain made working conditions hard and problematic. As construction slowly progressed, work on an incline from Blackball into the Paparoa Ranges was commenced by the Paparoa Coal Company. This line was ultimately taken over by the State Mines Department and involved a Fell centre rail for braking due to grades as steep as 1 in 25. This was not a full incline like its North Island counterpart, the Rimutaka Incline.

During 1909, the Public Works Department began carrying coal along the Blackball Branch, and in September that year, the State Mines Department began operating the Roa Incline. The Blackball Branch was not handed over to the New Zealand Railways Department and officially opened until 1 August 1910. The Roa Incline was owned by the State Mines Department for its entire life.

== Operation ==
Coal production from the mines increased greatly when the railway opened, as it permitted much larger quantities of coal to be carried. Workings on the Roa Incline were spectacular; sometimes up to eight trains a day would run down the Incline, relying only on handbrakes to avoid a runaway. Passenger services were operated to Blackball for a number of years, primarily for the mine workers, and these ceased in 1940.

Before 1955 the engine depot in Blackball closed and trains operated from Greymouth, and in 1955 Blackball station burned down. Trains to Blackball were typically operated by B and W^{F} class steam locomotives, with W and W^{A} locomotives on the Roa Incline. Diesel locomotives were never used on the Blackball Branch.

A significant impediment to the operation of the line was the difficulty and cost of maintaining the 510-metre (1,680 ft) length road-rail bridge across the Grey River. Poor design and construction meant that the bridge was frequently damaged by flooding, requiring expensive repairs. This situation eventually led to the closure of the line when the cost of maintenance became too high. The hazards of working such a steep incline without a continuous air brake were an important safety issue, leading to occasional runaways, although it is unclear whether any injury resulted from such situations.

Falling production and a decrease in orders meant that the State Mines Department closed the Roa Incline on 25 July 1960. From July 1963, only one train was permitted to operate on the Blackball Branch at a time, though due to the low quantity of traffic it is doubtful this policy ever had to be seriously enforced. By 1964, the line served just one active mine, operating on a limited basis. The Railways Department began to consider closure of the line, and when a flood on 21 February 1966 destroyed two spans of the Grey River bridge it was decided that repairs would not be economical, and the line was closed.

== Today ==
Four spans of the old railway bridge over in the Grey River stood until 2002 when they were dismantled. The bridge itself was kept in operation until 1968 as a road only bridge, and then several more years for pedestrians, until further flooding damage made it impractical to repair. Nearby, two towers of the cableway that preceded the railway can be seen amidst swampland near Ngahere. Another bridge remains in place across Ford Creek on the Roa Incline, still complete with pedestals for the centre rail. In the rugged terrain, some of the formation of the Blackball and Roa lines can be seen, though it is often not near roads and nature is steadily reclaiming the line. Few other remnants of the line exist.
