= NZR WB class =

NZR W^{B} class
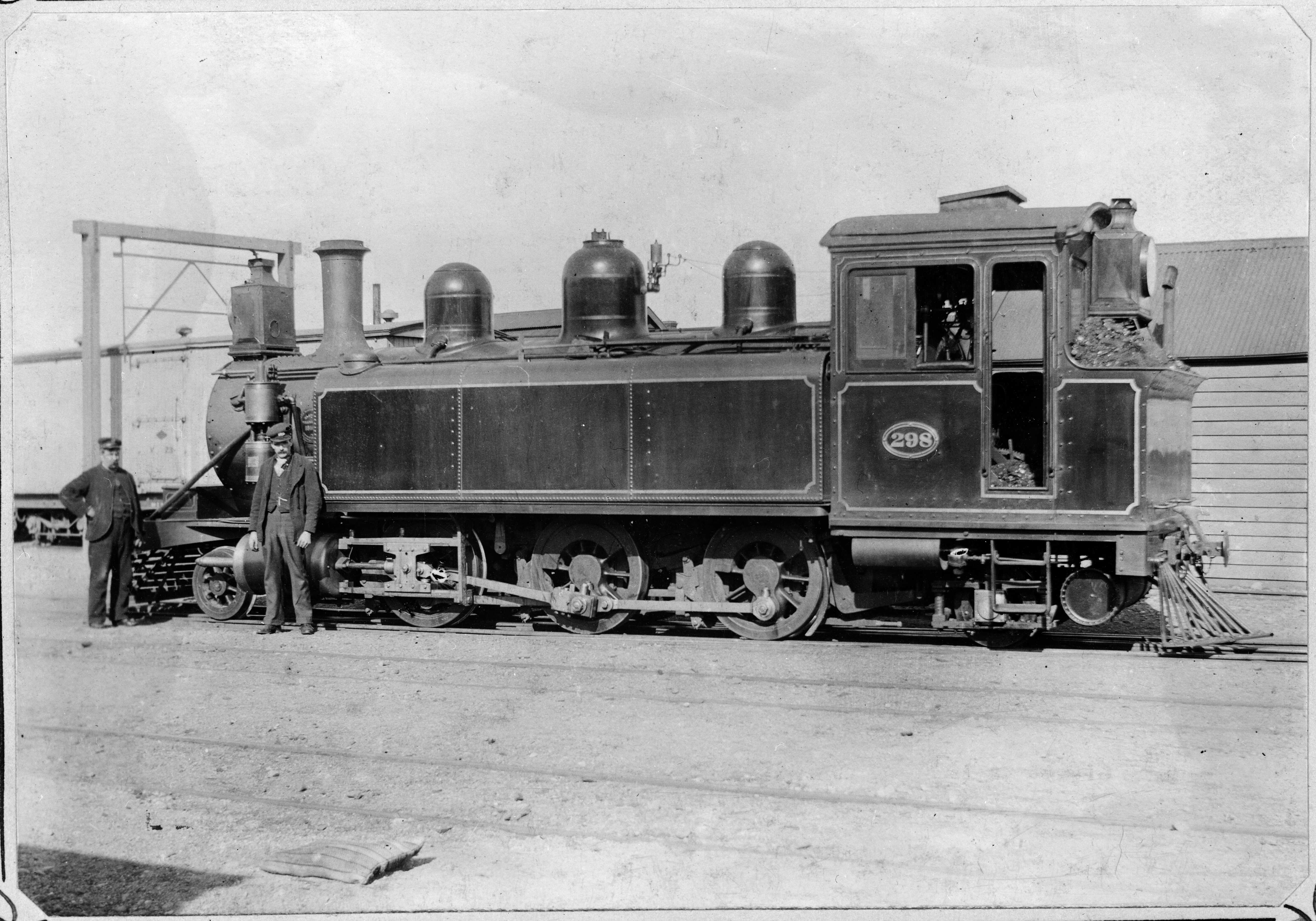
- W^{B} class no 298
Type and origin
- Power type: Steam
- Builder: Baldwin Locomotive Works
- Serial number: 16166–16177 (not in road number order)
- Build date: 1898
- Total produced: 12
Specifications
- Configuration
  - Whyte: 2-6-2T
- Gauge: 3 ft 6 in (1,067 mm)
- Driver dia.: 39.75 in (1.010 m)
- Length: 32 ft 9 in (9.98 m)
- Adhesive weight: 29.5 long tons (30.0 t; 33.0 short tons)
- Loco weight: 40.7 t (40.1 long tons; 44.9 short tons)
- Fuel type: Coal
- Firebox
  - Grate area: 17.3 sq ft (1.61 m^{2})
- Boiler pressure: 170 psi (1,172 kPa)
- Heating surface: 830 sq ft (77 m^{2})
- Cylinder size: 14 in × 20 in (356 mm × 508 mm)
Performance figures
- Tractive effort: 13,420 lbf (59.7 kN)
Career
- Operators: New Zealand Railways
- Numbers: 290–301
- Locale: Wanganui, Napier
- First run: 1899
- Retired: 1935–1960

The NZR W^{B} class was a class of steam tank locomotives that operated in New Zealand. Built in 1898 by the Baldwin Locomotive Works, the twelve members of the class entered service during the first five months of 1899. Eight were withdrawn by the end of 1935, while four others survived with new boilers until the mid-1950s.

== History ==
In the late 1890s, New Zealand's national network was expanding at a great rate and demand for services on existing lines was rising. The size of the locomotive fleet was inadequate to handle the demand - this was at least in part due to the economic difficulties created by the Long Depression. NZR had built the W^{A} class in its own workshops, but desperate for more locomotives, purchased locomotives from outside of New Zealand. High prices and workers' strikes in England meant that the Baldwin Locomotive Works of Pennsylvania was contracted in 1898 to provide twelve locomotives built to similar specifications as the W^{A} class. Delivery was swift, and the locomotives entered service between January and May 1899. Although initially classified as W^{A}, they were re-classified W^{B} in 1900–01 to avoid any confusion with the earlier locomotives constructed in New Zealand.

== Operation ==
Most were initially based at Whanganui's East Town depot, but two each went to Wellington and Westport and one to Whangārei. By World War I, they were equally distributed between Westport and Whangārei.

In their early years, W^{B} locomotives ran all kinds of trains from their main base in Wanganui - the New Plymouth Mail passenger express, goods trains to Napier and through the Wairarapa, and local mixed trains of passengers and freight from Wanganui to Hāwera and Palmerston North. Within a few years, more powerful locomotives displaced the W^{B} class from many of these services, and they were redeployed to Westport and Whangārei.

On the isolated Westport section, the dominant traffic was coal from the various inland mines served by rail, and the W^{B}s worked these services for a number of decades until they were displaced in the 1950s by the W^{W} class. During their years of operation, the W^{B} class was seen as ideal for operations on the lines that fanned out from Westport, and four were overhauled and given new boilers in the mid-1920s to prolong their lives.

== Withdrawal ==
The first withdrawals of W^{B} class locomotives occurred in the late 1920s, when Whangārei-based W^{B} 301 was retired in March 1928. By the end of 1932, all six W^{B}s that had been based in Whangārei were withdrawn - they were 290, 293, 295, 296, 297, and 301.

In Westport, the two locomotives that did not receive new boilers were withdrawn around the same time: W^{B} 291 ceased operations in December 1931 and was followed by W^{B} 294 in May 1935. Until the Westport section was linked to the national network in 1943, the remaining four had secure roles; although members of the W^{W} class had been introduced to Westport in 1929–30, they did not arrive in sufficient quantities to seriously displace the W^{B}s until the opening of the Stillwater - Westport Line.

During the 1940s, the extent of the operations of the W^{B}s decreased markedly, and by 1955, they were little more than shunters in Westport's yard. In the second half of 1955, W^{B} 298 and W^{B} 300 were withdrawn, and during the next year, the final two, 292 and 299, were removed from service, though they were not officially withdrawn until January 1957.

W^{B} 300 was towed to Dunedin to be scrapped, but this was not an economical procedure, and the other three were dumped in two Westland rivers to stabilise river banks and halt erosion. W^{B} 298 was dismantled in Westport and its boiler was dumped at the "locomotive graveyard" in Omoto, near Greymouth, while in 1958, W^{B} 292 was taken to Seddonville and toppled into Coal Creek. Eventually, it was joined by W^{B} 299 on 1 January 1960.

== Preservation ==
Inspired by the recovery of locomotives from riverbeds such as K 88 from the Ōreti River in Southland, the Baldwin Steam Trust was established to recover W^{B} 292 and W^{B} 299 from their resting place near Seddonville. The Seddonville Branch between Seddonville and Mokihinui Mine had closed in 1974, and by the late 1980s, nature had grown over the old formation, and there were no roads within a mile of where the two locomotives lay.

A plan was formulated, and in mid-1989, the engines were successfully recovered. The Baldwin Steam Trust ultimately plans to restore both locomotives back to full operational condition. 292 & 299 are at the Rimutaka Incline Railway Heritage Trust's Maymorn depot being restored.

- W^{B} 292 Baldwin No. 16172 of 1898
- W^{B} 299 Baldwin No. 16175 of 1898

== See also ==
- NZR W class
- NZR W^{A} class
- NZR W^{D} class
- NZR W^{E} class
- NZR W^{F} class
- NZR W^{G} class
- NZR W^{W} class
- NZR W^{S} / W^{AB} class
- Locomotives of New Zealand
