= NZR WA class =

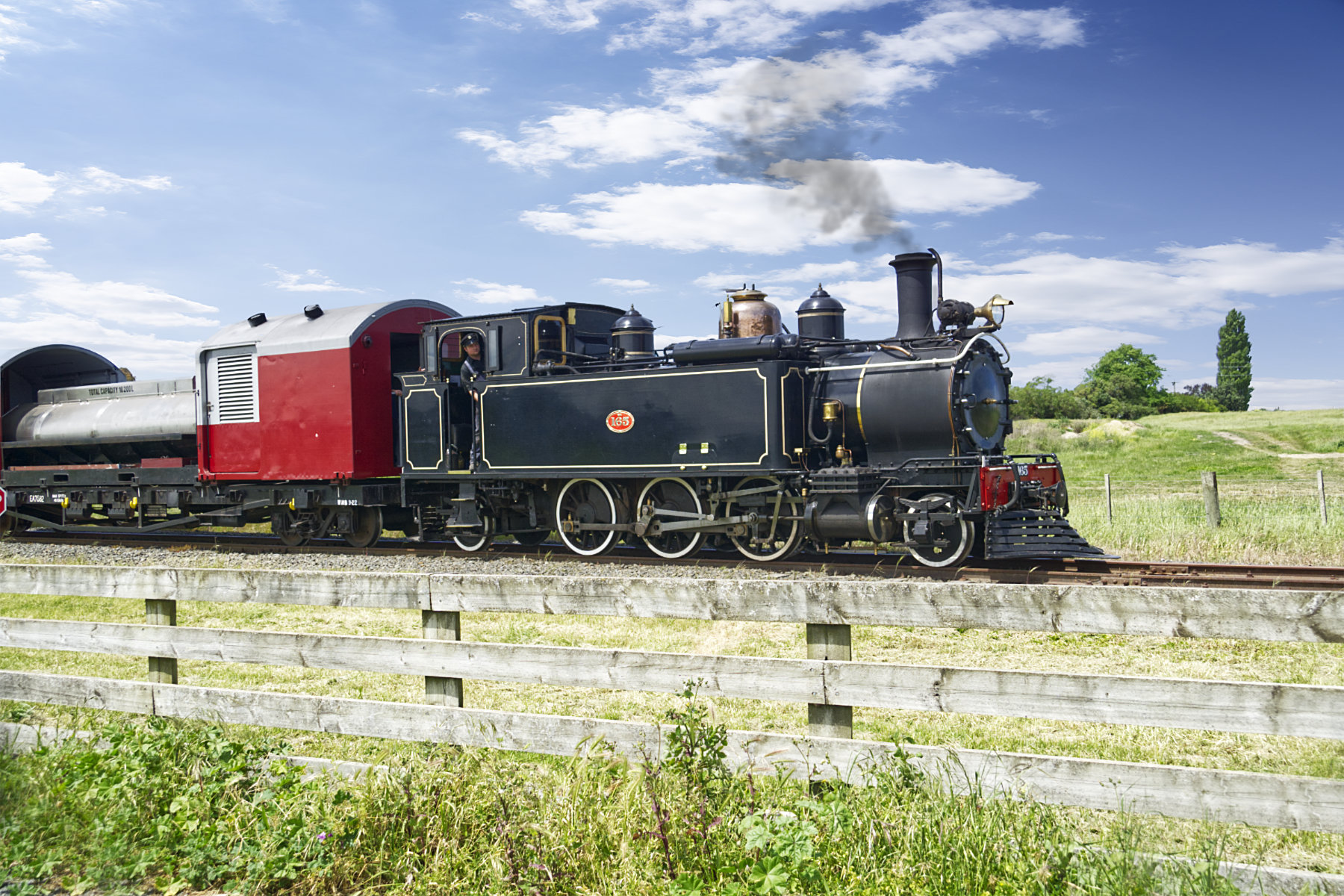
- Wa165 on Gisborne City Vintage Railway
Type and origin
- Power type: Steam
- Builder: NZR Addington Workshops, Hillside Workshops
- Build date: 1892-1903
Specifications
- Configuration
  - Whyte: 2-6-2T
- Gauge: 3 ft 6 in (1,067 mm)
- Wheel diameter: 39.75 in (1.010 m); 42.5 in (1.080 m) on rebuilt locos
- Wheelbase: 22 ft 3 in (6.78 m)
- Length: 29 ft 8 in (9.04 m)
- Adhesive weight: 26.2 long tons (26.6 t; 29.3 short tons)
- Loco weight: 37.2 long tons (37.8 t; 41.7 short tons)
- Fuel type: Coal
- Fuel capacity: 2 long tons (2.0 t; 2.2 short tons)
- Water cap.: 950 imp gal (4,300 L; 1,140 US gal)
- Firebox
  - Grate area: 12.0 sq ft (1.11 m^{2}); 11 sq ft (1.0 m^{2}) (nos 120, 262)
- Boiler pressure: 170 psi (1,172 kPa); 160 psi (1,103 kPa) (nos 120, 262)
- Heating surface: 738 sq ft (68.6 m^{2}); 556 sq ft (51.7 m^{2}) (nos 120, 262)
- Cylinders: Two
- Cylinder size: 14 in × 20 in (356 mm × 508 mm)
Performance figures
- Tractive effort: 13,420 lbf (59.7 kN); 11,810 lbf (52.5 kN) (rebuilt locos)
Career
- Number in class: 15 (11 new, 4 rebuilt)
- Locale: All of New Zealand
- First run: 1892
- Retired: 1929-1962
- Scrapped: 1962
- Current owner: Gisborne City Vintage Railway (1)
- Disposition: Withdrawn, 1 preserved

The NZR W^{A} class locomotives were a class of tank locomotive built by New Zealand Railways (NZR). Eleven were built at NZR's own Addington Workshops in Christchurch and Hillside Workshops in Dunedin. Four more were converted from old J class 2-6-0 locomotives.

Three were fitted with brakes to assist descent on the Fell-operated Rewanui and Roa inclines on the South Island's West Coast Region. These were among the last in use.

== Preservation ==
Only one W^{A} class has been preserved, number 165. The locomotive was restored by Gisborne City Vintage Railway in 2000.

== See also ==
- NZR W class
- NZR W^{B} class
- NZR W^{D} class
- NZR W^{E} class
- NZR W^{F} class
- NZR W^{G} class
- NZR W^{W} class
- NZR W^{S} / W^{AB} class
- Locomotives of New Zealand
