= NZR WAB class =

NZR W^{AB} class
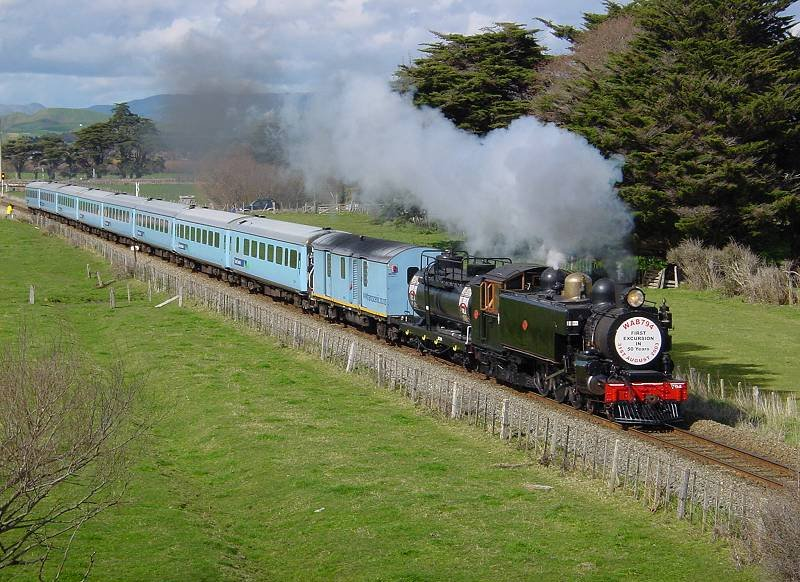
- W^{AB} 794 on its first excursion after restoration, with the Capital Connection rolling stock, on 31 August 2003.
Type and origin
- Power type: Steam
- Builder: NZR Addington Workshops, Christchurch (1+1); NZR Hillside Workshops, Dunedin (12+8); A&G Price, Thames (3+5)
- Build date: 1939
Specifications
- Configuration
  - Whyte: 4-6-4T
- Gauge: 3 ft 6 in (1,067 mm)
- Wheel diameter: 54 in (1.372 m)
- Wheelbase: 33 ft 1 in (10.08 m)
- Length: 44 ft 6 in (13.56 m)
- Adhesive weight: 41.85 long tons (42.52 t; 46.87 short tons)
- Loco weight: 74 long tons (75 t; 83 short tons)
- Fuel type: Coal
- Fuel capacity: 3.0 long tons (3.0 t; 3.4 short tons)
- Water cap.: 1,700 imp gal (7,700 L; 2,000 US gal)
- Firebox
  - Grate area: 33.0 sq ft (3.07 m^{2})
- Boiler pressure: 200 psi (1,379 kPa)
- Heating surface: 1,050 sq ft (98 m^{2})
- Superheater
  - Heating area: 183 sq ft (17.0 m^{2})
- Cylinders: Two
- Cylinder size: 17 in × 26 in (432 mm × 660 mm)
Performance figures
- Maximum speed: 60 mph (97 km/h)
- Power output: 1,000 bhp (750 kW)
- Tractive effort: 22,250 lbf (99.0 kN)
Career
- Number in class: 30 (16 W^{AB}+14 W^{S})
- Numbers: 687 - 798
- Locale: All of New Zealand
- First run: 1918 - 1926
- Retired: 1967 - 1972
- Scrapped: 1969 - 1972
- Current owner: Feilding and District Steam Rail Society (1)
- Disposition: Scrapped, three preserved

The NZR W^{AB} class locomotives were steam locomotives designed, built and used by New Zealand Railways Department (NZR). Their wheel arrangement is described by the Whyte notation 4-6-4T. The locomotives were designed by NZR chief draughtsman S.H. Jenkinson as tank versions of the A^{B} class 4-6-2 Pacific locomotive. Initially, the locomotives were separated into two classes, designated W^{AB} for mainline work and W^{S} for suburban work.

The remaining locomotives were kept in service until the last days of steam, operating short-haul mainline freight services and fast suburban services, particularly in Auckland. W^{AB} 794 was sold to the Ohai Railway Board in Southland for running heavy coal trains. The locomotives were progressively withdrawn in the 1960s.

== Introduction ==
The first locomotives, W^{S} 686 and W^{AB} 687, were built from the boilers, frames and engine units initially destined for A^{B} 666 and A^{B} 667. These entered service in 1917, W^{S} 686 in Wellington and W^{AB} 687 at Taumarunui in the central North Island. Fourteen W^{S} class locomotives were built between 1917 and 1925: one at Addington workshops (686), five at A&G Price, Thames (799-803) and eight at Hillside workshops, Dunedin (764-771). All the W^{S} class were converted to W^{AB} in 1932-4. Sixteen W^{AB} class were built between 1918 and 1926: one at Addington (687), 12 at Hillside (786-795) and three at A&G Price (796-798). In July 1922 the class was introduced on Auckland (until 1930 at Waitematā) to Papakura suburban services. Between 1947 and 1957, 11 W^{AB} class were converted to A^{B} class, following Wellington electrification, to reduce axle loads, for use on lighter lines.

== Preserved locomotives ==
Only three examples of the class remain, with two in their original form as W^{AB}s:

- W^{AB} 794 was donated by the Ohai Railway Board in 1968 to the New Zealand Railway and Locomotive Society and was moved to the Ferrymead Railway, and displayed for the Rail 125 celebrations in 1988. The locomotive has since been restored and is preserved at Feilding, and has been used on mainline excursions and also on the regular Wellington - Auckland Overlander service.
- W^{AB} (former W^{S}) 800 is owned by the Waikato Branch of New Zealand Railway and Locomotive Society and was stored for many years at the Te Awamutu Railway Museum. Following the negotiation of a lease agreement, the engine has been moved to the Glenbrook Vintage Railway for eventual restoration to working order.
- A^{B} (former W^{AB}) 795 is preserved at Kingston, for use on the "Kingston Flyer".

== See also ==
- NZR W class
- NZR W^{A} class
- NZR W^{B} class
- NZR W^{D} class
- NZR W^{E} class
- NZR W^{F} class
- NZR W^{G} class
- NZR W^{W} class
- Locomotives of New Zealand
