= NZR X class =

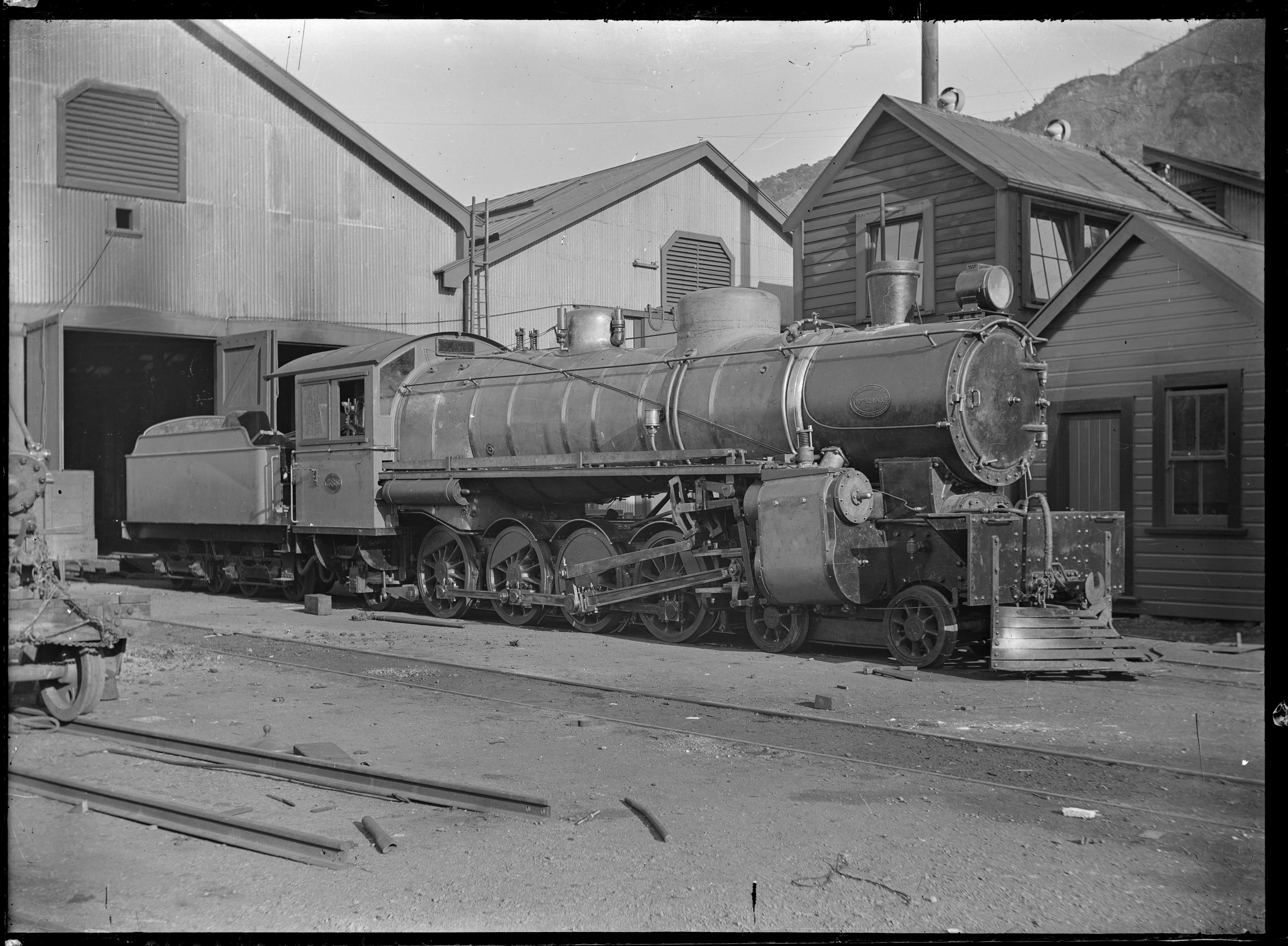
- X class 588, photographed leaving Petone Workshops circa 1913. Godber Collection, Alexander Turnbull Library.
Type and origin
- Power type: Steam
- Builder: NZR Addington Workshops
- Build date: 1908 - 1909, 1913 - 1915; 1943 - 1949 (rebuild)
Specifications
- Configuration
  - Whyte: 4-8-2
- Gauge: 3 ft 6 in (1,067 mm)
- Driver dia.: 45 in (1.143 m)
- Length: 56 ft 9.75 in (17.32 m)
- Adhesive weight: 46.7 long tons (47.4 t; 52.3 short tons) (original); 45.6 long tons (46.3 t; 51.1 short tons) (rebuild)
- Loco weight: 66.7 long tons (67.8 t; 74.7 short tons) (original); 66.6 long tons (67.7 t; 74.6 short tons) (rebuild)
- Tender weight: 27.3 long tons (27.7 t; 30.6 short tons) (original); 28.55 long tons (29.01 t; 31.98 short tons) (rebuild)
- Total weight: 94.0 long tons (95.5 t; 105.3 short tons) (original); 95.15 long tons (96.68 t; 106.57 short tons) (rebuild)
- Fuel type: Coal
- Fuel capacity: 4.0 long tons (4.1 t; 4.5 short tons) (original); 5.0 long tons (5.1 t; 5.6 short tons) (rebuild)
- Water cap.: 2,200 imp gal (10,000 L; 2,600 US gal)
- Firebox
  - Grate area: 37.1 square feet (3.4 m^{2}) (original); 37.5 square feet (3.5 m^{2}) (rebuild)
- Boiler pressure: 230 psi (1,586 kPa) (original); 215 psi (1,482 kPa) (rebuild)
- Heating surface: 2,066 sq ft (191.9 m^{2}) (original); 1,185 sq ft (110.1 m^{2}) (rebuild)
- Superheater
  - Heating area: None (original); 168 square feet (15.6 m^{2}) (rebuild)
- Cylinders: 2 high pressure + 2 low pressure (original); 4 high pressure (rebuild)
- High-pressure cylinder: 13.5 in × 22 in (343 mm × 559 mm)
- Low-pressure cylinder: 22 in × 22 in (559 mm × 559 mm)
Performance figures
- Maximum speed: 30 mph (48 km/h)
- Tractive effort: 26,620 lbf (118.4 kN) (original) (31,150 lbf (138.6 kN) starting); 29,500 lbf (131 kN) (rebuild)
Career
- Number in class: 18
- Numbers: 439–446; 588–597
- Locale: North Island Main Trunk
- First run: 1909
- Last run: 1957
- Retired: 1935–1957
- Current owner: Feilding & Districts Steam Rail Society (1)
- Disposition: One preserved, remainder scrapped

The New Zealand X class was a pioneering class of eighteen 4-8-2 steam locomotives built for New Zealand Railways Department (NZR) and designed by A. L. Beattie that operated on the national rail network of New Zealand. In 1908, a heavy and powerful locomotive was required to haul traffic on the newly completed mountainous central section of the North Island Main Trunk Railway, and as a logical progression of the 4-6-2 Q class design, the 4-8-2 wheel arrangement was created for the X class.

== Overview ==
When the first X was completed in 1908 at NZR's Addington Workshops in Christchurch, it was the very first 4-8-2 tender locomotive built in the world. The 4-8-2 design went on to be popular in the United States and was nicknamed the "Mountain" type; one theory suggests this name stems from the mountainous terrain that inspired the X's design, while another suggests the Chesapeake and Ohio Railway first coined the name in reference to its 4-8-2s of 1911 that were built to operate in the Allegheny Mountains.

The X class were restricted to the 93 miles (150 km) Taumarunui to Taihape section for some years, as the track north and south was 53 lb/yd (26 kg/m) rather than 70 lb/yd (35 kg/m) and their trains were restricted to 25 mph (40 km/h) for passengers and 20 mph (32 km/h) for freight. This caused frustration to general manager Hiley who wanted them used over the entire NIMT (they had had to be partially dismantled for their initial journey to Taihape).

The X class initially operated as the freight counterpart of the passenger A class, but they struggled to reach speeds higher than 50 km/h (31 mph). They were built as de Glehn compound locomotives, but during the 1940s most of the class were converted to simple-expansion superheated locomotives. This increased their power but did not prolong their lives and most were officially withdrawn on 2 March 1957. However, a few had withdrawn before this and two were sold in 1946 to the Ohai Railway Board (ORB), which operated a private industrial line at the end of the Wairio Branch.

== Preservation ==
When the Ohai Railway Board introduced diesel locomotives introduced diesel locomotives in 1968, X 442 was donated to the New Zealand Railway and Locomotive Society, and it was eventually stored at the Ferrymead Railway in Christchurch. In 2002, X 442 was relocated to the Feilding and District Steam Rail Society depot in Feilding. Two X class boilers are held by Mainline Steam Heritage Trust.
