= Rapahoe Branch =

Branch railway near Greymouth, New Zealand

Map

The Rapahoe Branch is a branch line railway that forms part of New Zealand's national rail network and is located on the West Coast of the South Island. It has been operational since 1923 and was named the Rapahoe Industrial Line until 2011.

== History ==
=== Construction ===
The line was built as a sub-branch of the now-closed Rewanui Branch, with the junction in Runanga. Approximately four kilometres in length, it was opened on 3 September 1923 to serve the Strongman Mine. When the Rewanui Branch closed on 19 August 1985, the Rapahoe Branch gained the six kilometres from Greymouth to Runanga that was opened 1 December 1904.

=== Upgrade ===
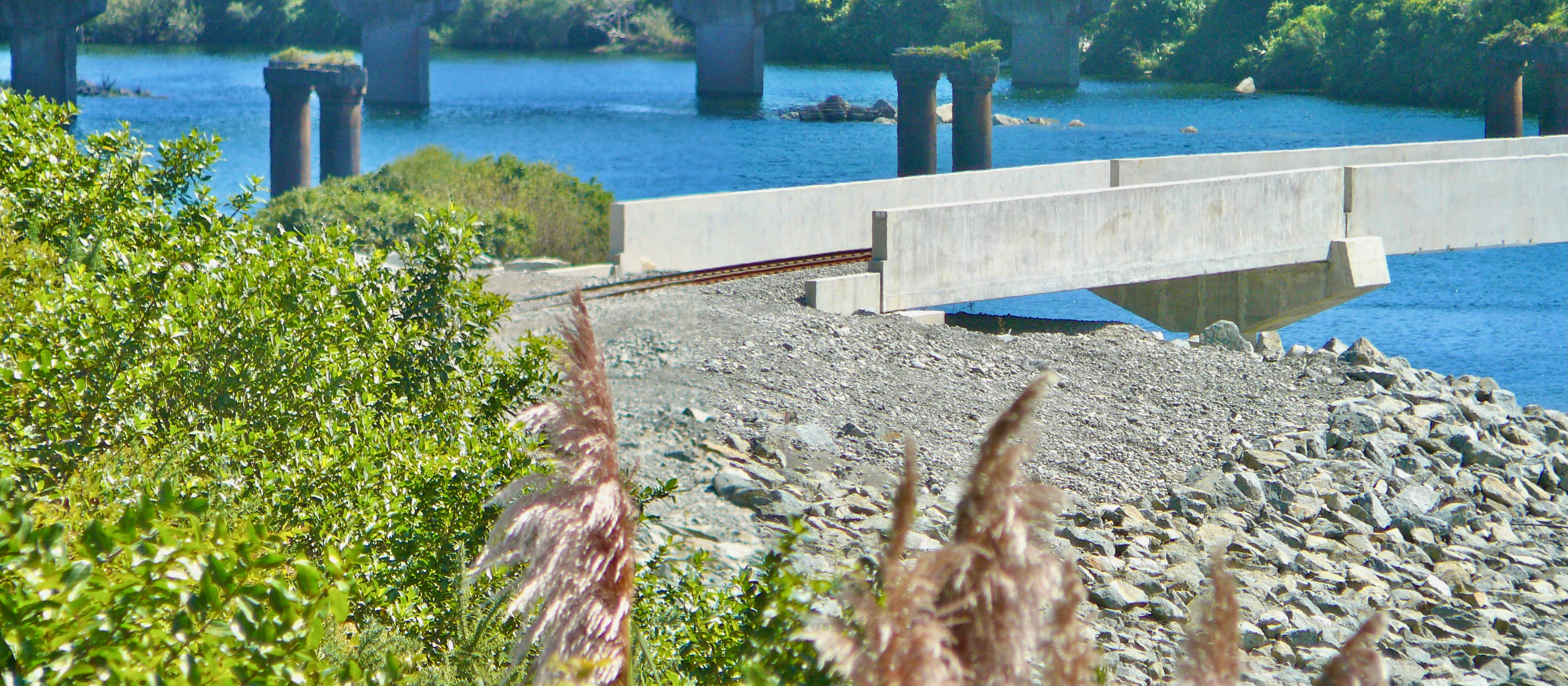
Rebuilt Cobden rail bridge in 2010 from Greymouth bank

The most recent significant upgrade on the line involved the replacement of Bridge No. 1 in 2006. The original S-shaped wooden structure, built by the Greymouth Point Elizabeth Coal Company in 1896, was considered to be structurally unsound.

The new bridge, using a concrete channel design with a ballasted deck, was built by contractors HEB Smithbridge Limited using designs drawn up by ONTRACK in consultation with their building contractors. The $15m project was funded largely by state coal miner Solid Energy and took 18 months to build. Located upstream from the original bridge, it is slightly longer than the original at 285 meters. Its southern end has also been reorientated away from Greymouth to a new junction at Omoto, a move designed to eliminate the need for trains to and from the branch to need to enter Greymouth to reposition the locomotives and the attendant road and rail disruption this caused.

The last northbound train to cross the old bridge was empty coal shunt X-1 on Sunday 28 May 2006. The following day, the track at the Cobden end of the old bridge was severed and a day later, the track at the Greymouth end was also cut. Over the next four days, work was carried out on switching the line over to the new bridge. The first revenue train over the new bridge was No. 834, a Christchurch-bound coal train, on Friday 2 June 2006.

Despite being offered by ONTRACK to the Department of Conservation for preservation, the old bridge was demolished in July. The Department cited the unsound nature of the structure and noted that the funds that would be required to restore it would exceed its budget for the area. Two truss sections have been preserved. One is located on the southern bank of the Grey River. The other is on the Cobden side of the river, in its original position.

== Operation ==
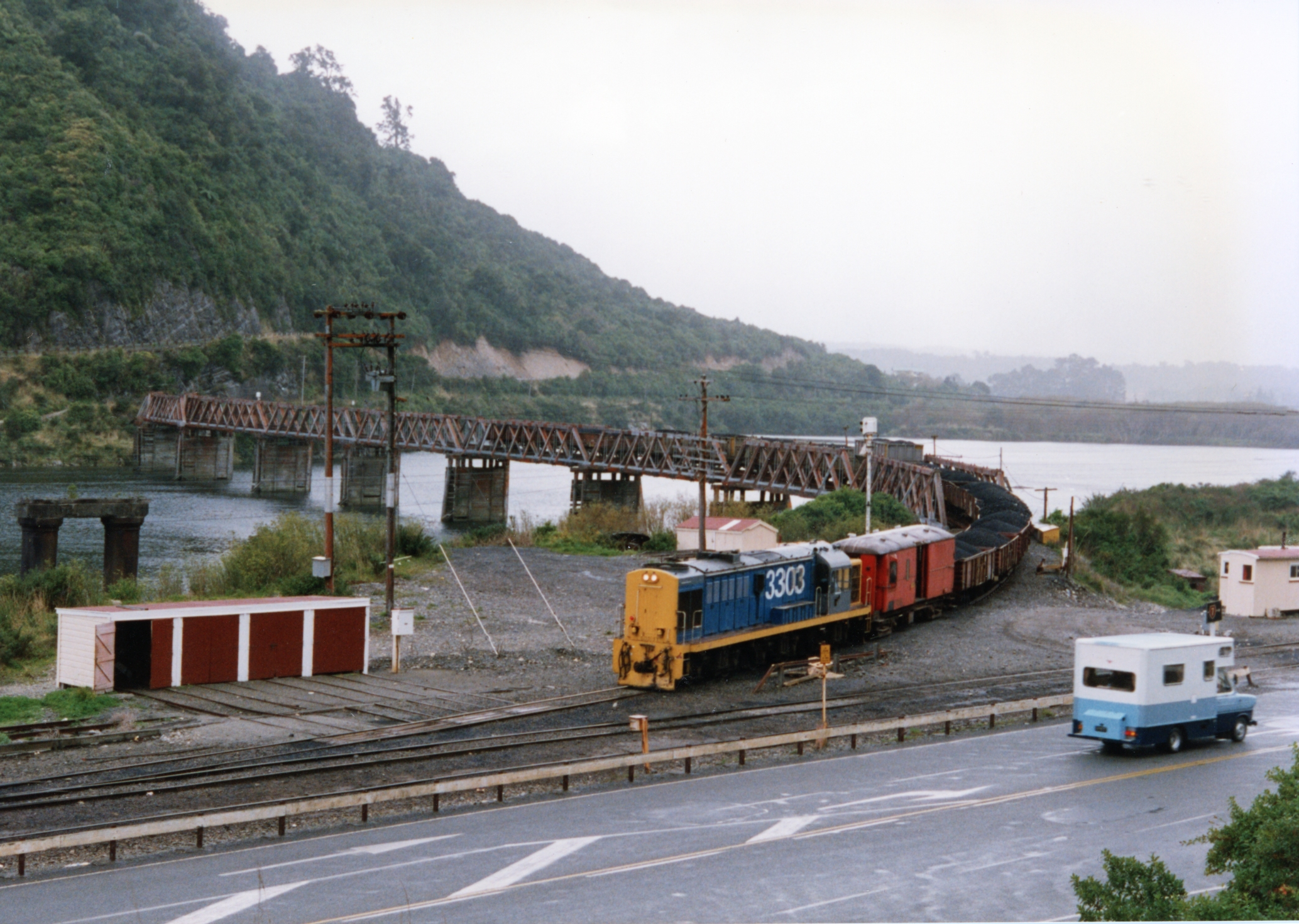
Cobden Bridge with a coal train to Greymouth in 1987 with DJ3303.

In the era of steam locomotives, the line was typically worked by members of the A, B, and B^{A} classes. In 1969, the line was dieselised and members of the DJ and DSC classes became the typical motive power.

The line was slightly abbreviated in the first years of the 21st century. The mines served at the terminus had closed, so the Rapahoe terminus was moved to Rocky Creek, closer to its current source of business.

The only traffic on the line is coal. It was originally exported via coastal shipping from Greymouth's wharf, but it is now exported via the deepwater port of Lyttelton, near Christchurch on the opposite coast of the South Island. Services were temporarily suspended during the second half of 2007 as the coal mine served ceased production while a programme of upgrades was undertaken. Trains operated twice daily between Rapahoe and Lyttelton until early June 2007, when they were adjusted to run only when required. Later that month, services were fully cancelled and the line was not in use by any regularly scheduled trains for approximately six months. In mid-December, the resumption of services was announced as the coal mine resumed operation. The initial schedule provided for two trains each way, one in the early morning and one in the early afternoon. Each carries 1,500 tonnes of coal in 30 wagons and takes two hours to load.

=== Present ===
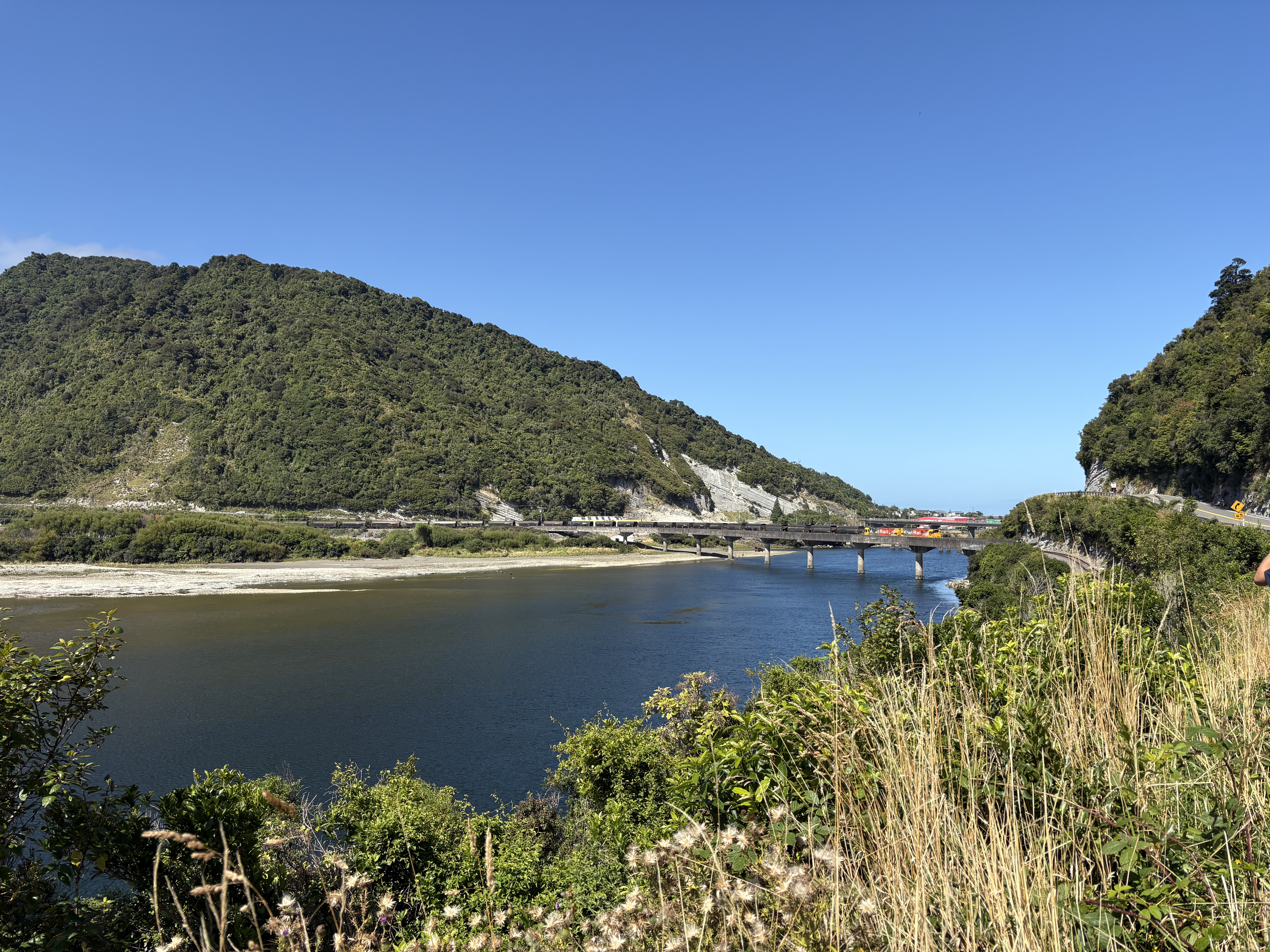
A pair of DX Class locomotives pull a coal train over the Cobden Rail Bridge at the beginning of the line. February 2025.

Trains now operate very infrequently on the Rapahoe Branch. They only operate by demand between Christchurch and Rapahoe.

== Stations ==
The only station on the line from Runanga is the terminus at Rapahoe. The Rapahoe station was situated 3.72 km from the junction, with the end of rails at the 4.09 km peg.
