= NZR WF class =

Class of 41 New Zealand 2-6-4T locomotives

NZR W^{F} class
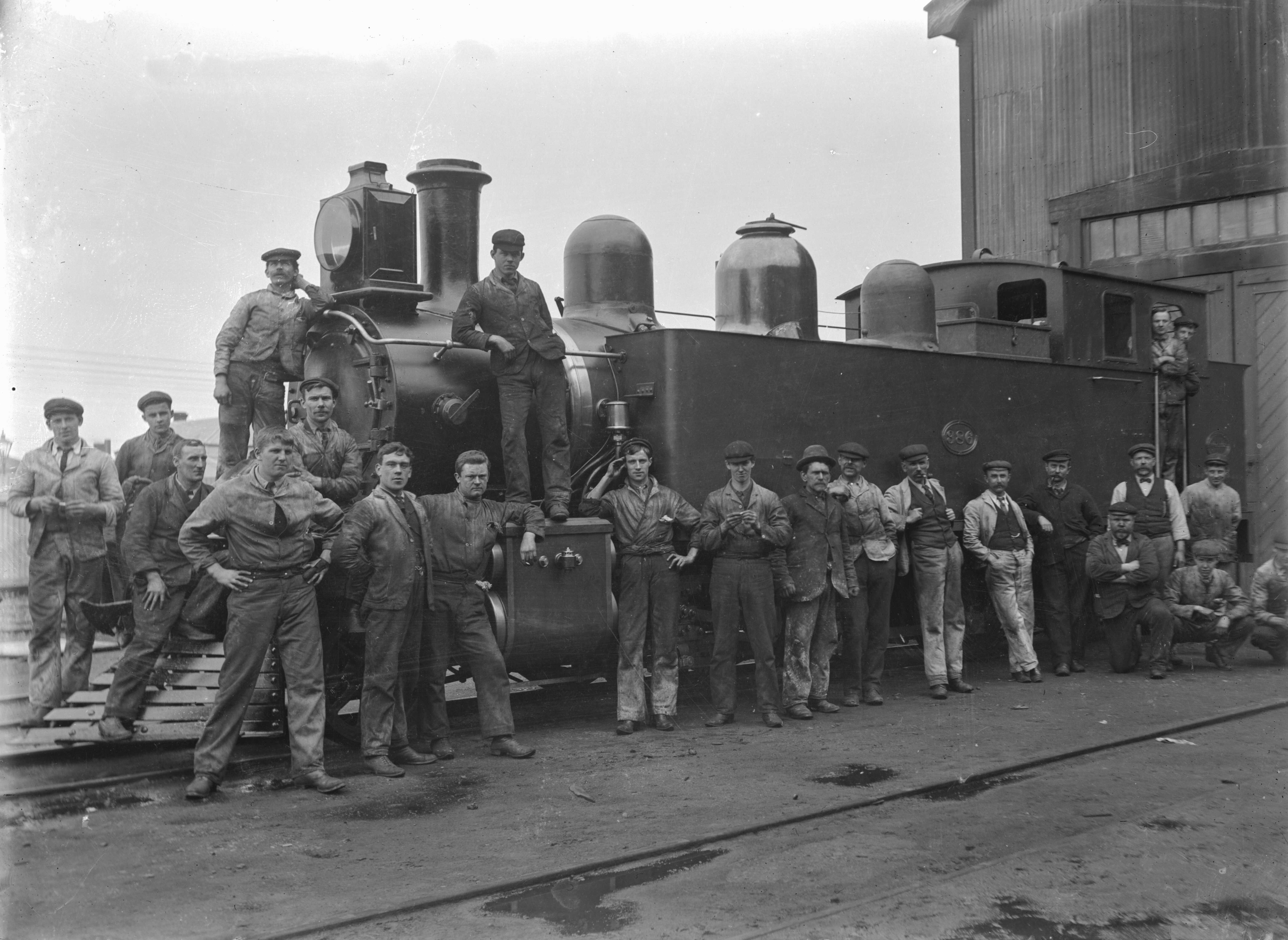
- W^{F} class steam locomotive, NZR number 386
Type and origin
- Power type: Steam
- Designer: A. L. Beattie
- Builder: NZR Addington Workshops, Christchurch (10); NZR Hillside Workshops, Dunedin (16); A & G Price, Thames (15)
- Serial number: 59 - 68, 74 - 79, 84 - 93 (NZR); 1 - 12, 121 - 123 (A & G Price)
- Build date: 1904 - 1908, 1928
Specifications
- Configuration
  - Whyte: 2-6-4T
- Driver dia.: 45 in (1.143 m)
- Wheelbase: 27 ft 0 in (8.23 m)
- Length: 34 ft 2 in (10.41 m)
- Adhesive weight: 26.9 long tons (27.3 t; 30.1 short tons)
- Loco weight: 43.7 long tons (44.4 t; 48.9 short tons)
- Fuel type: Coal
- Fuel capacity: 2.2 long tons (2.2 t; 2.5 short tons)
- Water cap.: 950 imp gal (4,300 L; 1,140 US gal)
- Firebox
  - Grate area: 15.4 square feet (1.43 m^{2})
- Boiler pressure: 200 psi (1,379 kPa)
- Heating surface: 729 square feet (67.7 m^{2})
- Cylinders: Two
- Cylinder size: 14 in × 22 in (356 mm × 559 mm)
Performance figures
- Tractive effort: 15,330 lbf (68.2 kN)
Career
- Number in class: 41
- Numbers: 62, 379 - 398, 400 - 405, 430 - 438, 467 - 468, 842 - 844
- First run: 20 December 1904
- Last run: March 1968
- Retired: May 1954 - March 1968
- Preserved: Three
- Current owner: Steam Incorporated, Canterbury Railway Society, Nelson Railway Society
- Disposition: 29 scrapped 8 sold to Tasmania (withdrawn); 3 preserved

The NZR W^{F} class were steam locomotives designed, built and used by New Zealand Railways (NZR). Their wheel arrangement is described by the Whyte notation 2-6-4T and the first members of the class entered service in 1904. The locomotives were tank engines designed by the Railways Department's Chief Mechanical Engineer A. L. Beattie, and were mainly built for suburban duties such as those between Christchurch and Lyttelton. They also saw main-line service in the Taranaki region, but most of the class members were assigned to branch line and local services throughout the country. Two were experimentally converted to oil burners in 1909-1910. The tests were satisfactory, but as coal was much cheaper than oil at the time, no further conversions took place.

There were 41 in the class; built by Addington Workshops (10), Hillside Workshops (16), and A & G Price of Thames (15).

== Construction and design ==
In 1902, a drawing was made showing a 2-6-4T tank locomotive, based on a proposal to convert the NZR V class 2-6-2 tender locomotives to tank locomotives. It was noted that the tractive effort of the new engine was 10,260lbs, considerably less than the 12,890lbs of the slightly smaller NZR W class 2-6-2T, and that a new boiler with a greater working pressure of 140psi would be required to have made the conversion of any real use. It was considered uneconomic to fit new boilers to the old V class frames and running gear, which would have retained the obsolete Stephenson link motion and so the proposal lapsed in favour of developing the last three engines of the W^{A} class 2-6-2T tank locomotives, nos. 50, 68, and 137.

In 1903, chief draftsman G. A. Pearson designed what was to become the eventual W^{F} class tank locomotive. The new locomotive proposed was a modestly-sized 2-6-4T tank locomotive with 45-inch driving wheels and an adhesive weight of just under 27 tons. The Walschaerts valve gear actuated inside-admission piston valves, which would later become a standard on all subsequent NZR designs. With a maximum 9.3 tons axle loading on the driving wheels, the new locomotive would have a wide radius of action. Tractive effort was calculated at 15,330lbs with a working boiler pressure of 200psi.

Forty-one engines of the type were built:

Road numbers	Number of	Builder	Time period
379-388	10	NZR Addington	1904-05
389-398	10	A & G Price	1904-05
501, 502	2	A & G Price	1906 for PWD
400-405	6	NZR Hillside	1907
62, 430-438	10	NZR Hillside	1908-09
842-844	3	A & G Price	1928

Of the forty-one W^{F} class locomotives built, thirty-nine were built for NZR. The other two were built by A & G Price of Thames for the Public Works Department in 1906, who allocated them numbers PWD 501 and 502. These locomotives were taken over by the NZR in 1909, and were renumbered as W^{F} 467 and W^{F} 468 respectively.

== Into service ==
The W^{F} class was designed primarily for suburban duties, although the class saw a wider sphere of operations; during their early years several ran mainline trains in Taranaki for a time before being replaced by larger engines. Four were later dispatched to Nelson, while seven others (numbers 389/90/93/98/432/34/68) were sent at various times to the Picton Section between 1915 and 1936. By the time of the final Picton transfer in 1936 there were six engines - the seventh, W^{F} 398, had been returned to the North Island three years previously in 1933.

The majority of the class, however, settled down to suburban and branch line duties. From 1935 onwards, two engines of this class, W^{F}'s 398 and 400, were converted to one-man operation by lowering the coal bunker and fitting one continuous back window to the cab, and allocated to work the Greytown Branch. One locomotive would be kept at Cross Creek during the week while the other was stationed at Greytown, and would swap around when the Greytown engine needed to come to Cross Creek for servicing. Both locomotives were withdrawn on closure of the Greytown Branch; W^{F} 400 in December 1955, while W^{F} 398 remained in service for several months primarily to run the demolition trains and during which time it moved the Greytown station building to Woodside Junction to become the new goods shed there.

In 1909, trials were conducted with W^{F} 436 to see if a solution could be found to reducing the amount of smoke produced by engines passing through the Lyttelton Tunnel. 436 was briefly converted to oil-firing for this purpose, but although the tests were satisfactory, oil was at that time three times more expensive than coal, and so W^{F} 436 was reconverted to coal firing. Eventually, the problem was solved by the electrification of the line between Christchurch and Lyttelton in 1929 when the E^{C} class entered service.

== The Nelson Section W^{F} ==
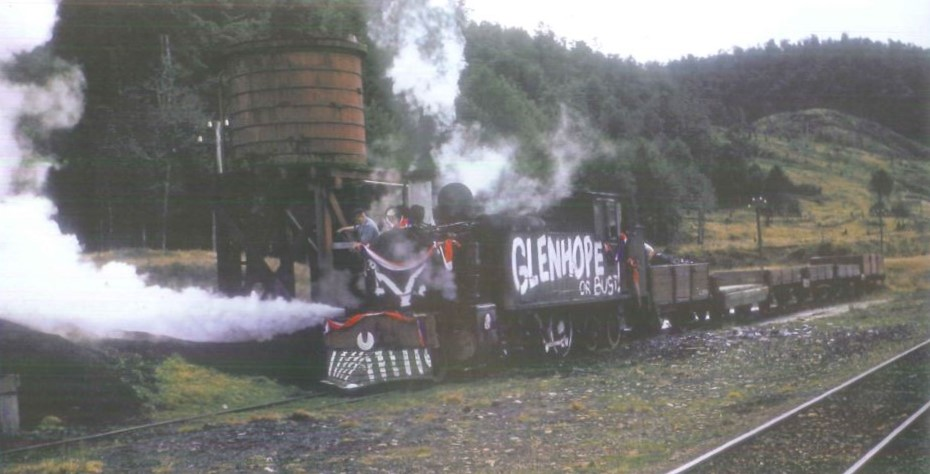
W^{F} 404 being serviced at Glenhope. The date is the 12 of June 1954, the last day of regular passenger operation. Note the fireman giving the smokebox a blowdown.

The isolated Nelson Section received four W^{F} class locomotives from the 1920s onwards to replace its stud of smaller locomotives, primarily the D class 2-4-0T and F^{A} 0-6-2T tank locomotives. These locomotives were smaller than the W^{F} class locomotives, and the arrival of the larger engines allowed for the smaller D and F^{A} class locomotives to be withdrawn, and in the case of the D class engines, transfer to other parts of the NZR network or sale to industrial users.

The first of an eventual four locomotives of this class to be brought to the Nelson Section, W^{F} 404, arrived in 1915 and replaced D 144, one of the original locomotives on the Nelson Section. It was followed in turn by W^{F} 62 in 1919 and W^{F} 395 in 1925, with the last, W^{F} 397 arriving from Auckland in July 1937. All four locomotives were fitted with non-superheated or saturated, boilers.

The four Nelson locomotives were never fitted with superheaters. Instead, they were equipped with smokebox blowdown valves on the right-hand side of the locomotive, the only NZR locomotives to be fitted with this modification. This was intended to increase the steaming capacity of the locomotives, making it easier to eject the ash, cinders and soot that would collect in the smokeboxes of the locomotives. A small port on the left-hand side of the smokebox was opened to assist this process, allowing one of the crew to brush down the smokebox and clean the spark arrestor.

The locomotives were not known to be in the best condition due to decades of deferred maintenance at Nelson. One example of this is W^{F} 62, which had its boiler inspected in 1926. It was found the boiler had only two years of life left, and notice was given that the engine should not be used after 1928. The locomotive soldiered on, and was the last engine in steam on the Nelson Section in 1956.

In 1955, Addington Workshops fitter Noel Mather was sent to Nelson due to the failure of all four W^{F} class locomotives. At that time, W^{F} 62 had been withdrawn earlier that year due to a badly cracked smokebox saddle, W^{F} 395 had not run in some years and was now the source of the spare parts, W^{F} 397 was out of service requiring valve repairs, new piston rings and side-rod brasses, and new trailing bogie flanges as well as unspecified repairs to sundry minor parts. W^{F} 404, previously the only operable steam locomotive at Nelson, had been removed from service with small cracks in the smokebox saddle. It had been steaming poorly, and its valves were out of time, requiring some attention. Eventually, 62, 397, and 404 were returned to service.

The first of the Nelson Section W^{F}'s to be scrapped was W^{F} 395. There are no photographs showing W^{F} 395 in service after 1951, indicating that it was probably withdrawn sometime during that year, although it lingered at Nelson as a source of spare parts for another five years. In March 1956, the hulk of 395 was stripped of all useful components and the rest was broken up for scrap.

W^{F}'s 62 and 404 were used to run the demolition trains, while W^{F} 397 remained at Nelson as the spare engine. However, 397 was only used once on the demolition trains in April 1956, only to be failed when it dropped a fusible plug. The locomotive was not repaired as both 62 and 404 were in reasonable condition, and therefore 397 would only need to be resurrected should one of the other two locomotives fail.

All three remaining W^{F} class locomotives were withdrawn in December 1956 when the dismantling of the railway was completed. At the time there was a consideration to dismantling the locomotives and transporting them to Picton. This did not eventuate, and the three locomotives were scrapped in 1957. Any useful parts were then taken on to Picton and used as spares for their two W^{F} class locomotives.

Although equipped with Westinghouse compressor pumps, photographs of the Nelson Section W^{F}'s show that the brake hoses had been removed, although W^{F} 397 sported brake hoses for a time in 1956. Most of the Nelson Section's rolling stock was not air-braked, and so the brake hoses were removed. The remainder of the brake piping remained in case there was ever need to re-equip these locomotives to run with air-braked trains.

== Tasmanian Government Railways DS class ==
Immediately following the Great Depression in 1936, the Tasmanian Government Railways (TGR) found itself unable to manage the increased tonnages it was being made to handle. Many older locomotives which had been withdrawn and were due to be scrapped were returned to service but a shortage of locomotives remained. The Chief Mechanical Engineer, H. J. Bennett, wrote to the CME of the New Zealand Government Railways, P. R. Angus, requesting a book of engineering drawings of NZR locomotives, and also asking if the NZR had any locomotives it could sell to TGR, enquiring in particular to the W^{W} class 4-6-4T tank locomotives.

Angus advised Bennett that the NZR could not spare any W^{W} class locomotives as they were indispensable to NZR. He instead offered the W^{F} class 2-6-4T as a suitable design that could be released due to the conversion of locomotives of classes B^{B} (4-8-0) and C (2-6-2) to heavy shunting locomotives. The W^{F} class was by now largely confined to shunting work, except for those allocated to the isolated Picton and Nelson sections.

TGR agreed to purchase a batch of four W^{F} class locomotives in 1939. Accordingly, Angus wrote to the District Mechanical Engineers in Wellington and Christchurch, before asking James Binstead, the DME for the South Island, to select four W^{F} class locomotives for sale. On receipt of this request, locomotives W^{F}'s 381, 385, 436 and 437 were withdrawn and transferred to Hillside Workshops for overhaul and rebuilding to TGR specifications.

TGR purchased a further four locomotives in 1944 due to wartime requirements on traffic. This time four North Island locomotives were selected, W^{F}'s 392, 405, 431 and 434. These locomotives were equipped with new welded boilers making them marginally more expensive than the 1939 batch, which had retained their original saturated boilers. The four locomotives were rebuilt at Hutt Workshops before being shipped to Tasmania.

The eight locomotives became the TGR DS class on arrival and entry into service, receiving road numbers DS 1-8. They were used on suburban service in and around Hobart and also for shunting and short-haul freight work. The locomotives were not particularly successful as the TGR used soft coal, on which the W^{F} class were known to be reluctant steamers. Certain engines also suffered from reliability concerns, which later led to trial modifications made to DS 7 (W^{F} 434) by shortening the smokebox by 520mm and fitting a narrower 'Master Mechanics' funnel. This modification was successful, but despite the order to equip more engines with this modification, DS 7 remained the sole engine with this alteration.

The first four locomotives were identifiable from the later four by several distinguishing features:

- The first four locomotives had brass 'acorns' on their smokebox doors, while the latter four did not.
- The first batch of four locomotives had small shunting-style headlights. The second batch had larger mainline headlights, which were later replaced with the shunting-style headlights later in their working lives.
- The sanding gear on the first batch of locomotives was hand-operated. On the second batch, the sanding gear was operated by a vacuum ejector.

The locomotives were all fitted with three-link screw couplings, vacuum brakes in place of Westinghouse air brakes, Detroit sight-feed lubricators, and electric marker lights on the smokebox side and bunker to make them suitable for TGR service. With the arrival of the new DP railmotors and the V class 0-6-0DM diesel shunters (mechanically similar to the D^{S} class), these locomotives were progressively withdrawn from 1951 when DS 2 was withdrawn. The last, DS 7, was withdrawn from TGR service in 1958.

DS 1 and DS 4 were sold in 1951 and 1952 respectively to the Mount Lyell Railway & Mining Company, who operated them until 1953. The locomotives were used mostly between Regatta Point-Dubbil Barril and Rinadeena-Queenstown, and had their cowcatchers removed to facilitate transfer over the rack section of the line. DS 1 was first to be withdrawn in 1953 and was used as spare parts for Regatta Point-based DS 4, which was withdrawn later that year. These locomotives were fired on a mix of 60% Tasmanian soft coal and 40% NSW hard coal, which delivered a better result in steaming.

During 1953 the Emu Bay Railway required a shunting locomotive to work in their Burnie yard. TGR appropriately reactivated DS 5, which was sent to Burnie and worked there for several months. It was later returned to TGR, and was finally written off and scrapped in 1956 at the Launceston Railway Workshops.

Today, the last remnant of the DS class (other than the New Zealand Railways builders' plates) is the superheated boiler from DS 8 (W^{F} 392), owned by the Van Diemen's Light Railway Society and stored at their Don River Railway. It was used after withdrawal to provide steam for the caustic baths at Launceston Workshops.

== Preservation ==
Three W^{F} class locomotives were donated for preservation:

- W^{F} 386 (NZR Addington 66/1905) was used from 1958 to 1958 as the resident shunting locomotive at NZR Otahuhu. On its withdrawal, the locomotive was donated by NZR to the City of Taumarunui in recognition of the part the locomotive played in hauling the Parliamentary Special of 1908, the first train to cross the North Island Main Trunk. In 1978, Steam Incorporated of Paekakariki enquired as to the possibility of acquiring W^{F} 386 and returning it to service. This was agreed to and the locomotive was transported by road to Paekakariki where Steam Inc volunteers began to dismantle it for an overhaul. The overhaul was stopped shortly after the locomotive was disassembled. Following this, the frames of W^{F} 386 were stored on two x-25330 'Timken' passenger carriage bogies in the Paekakariki yard, with other parts stored around the site, until the decision was made in early 2013 to move the parts into the carriage shed in order to protect them from further deterioration. As the locomotive's use would be limited, there are plans to restore 386 after K^{A} 945 has been restored.
- W^{F} 393 (A & G Price 5/1904) was withdrawn from NZR service at Linwood in Christchurch in 1967 and stored at Linwood Locomotive Depot until 1968. It was then donated by the Minister for Railways, the Hon. J. B. Gordon, to the New Zealand Railway & Locomotive Society (Canterbury Branch) for preservation on their Ferrymead Railway. The locomotive was then trucked from Linwood to Ferrymead in 1968 and placed on a short length of track beside the former Ferrymead wharf, minus its cowcatchers. When withdrawn from service, W^{F} 393 had a suspect firebox that would have required repairs before the locomotive could be returned to service. It is currently stored in the locomotive shed at Moorhouse behind W^{D} 357 and Price Cb 113, and there are no plans, long-term or otherwise, to restore it to operational condition. The W^{F} has occasionally come outside for display during special events, the last instance being November 2013.
- W^{F} 403 (NZR Hillside 77/1907) was withdrawn from service at Greymouth in 1969 and towed to Linwood Locomotive Depot for storage. It was donated to the City of Nelson in 1973 in recognition of the four W^{F} class locomotives used on the Nelson Section and placed on display in Nelson after receiving cosmetic attention. The locomotive was later given to the Grand Tapawera Railroad Company who intended to restore it to working condition. The locomotive's firebox required repairs before the locomotive could operate again, and the overhaul ceased after local company Anchor Dorman gas-cut the inner firebox out by questionable methods. The boiler shell was later replaced on the frames and the locomotive went on display at Founders Park in Nelson, the new home of the Nelson Railway Society. In the early 2000s, the overhaul was restarted and it is hoped W^{F} 403 would return to service in 2015. But due to the curvature of the line, re-alignment of the track has to be done before further work on making it operational continues.

== See also ==
- NZR W class
- NZR W^{A} class
- NZR W^{B} class
- NZR W^{D} class
- NZR W^{E} class
- NZR W^{G} class
- NZR W^{W} class
- NZR W^{S} / W^{AB} class
- Locomotives of New Zealand
