= NZR WG class =

NZR W^{G} class
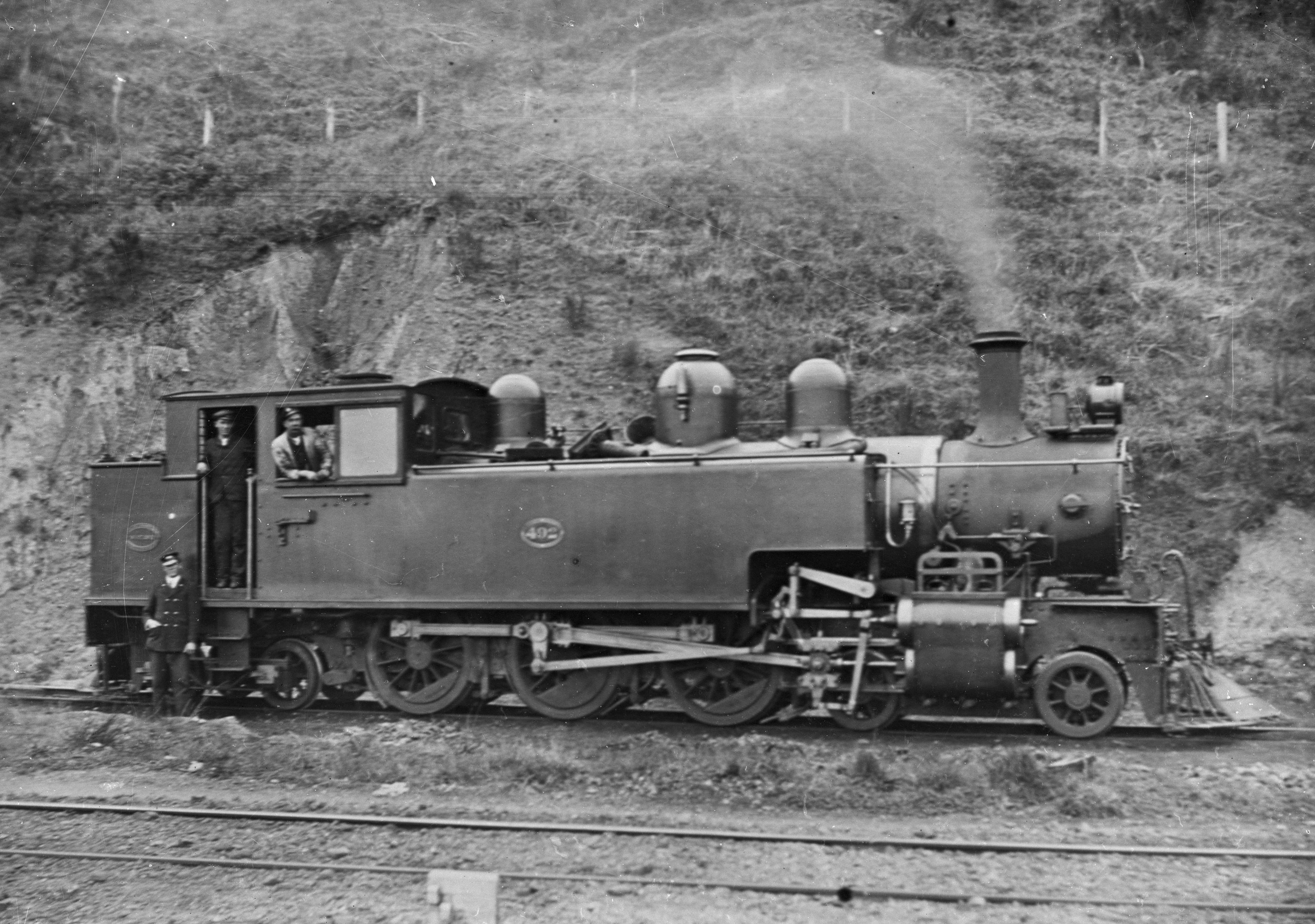
- W^{G} No. 492, Godber Collection, Alexander Turnbull Library.
Type and origin
- Power type: Steam
- Builder: NZGR Hillside
- Build date: 1910-1912
- Total produced: 20
Specifications
- Configuration
  - Whyte: 4-6-4T
- Gauge: 3 ft 6 in (1,067 mm)
- Driver dia.: 45 in (1.143 m)
- Adhesive weight: 29.7 long tons (30.2 t)
- Loco weight: 50.5 long tons (51.3 tonnes; 56.6 short tons)
- Fuel type: Coal
- Firebox
  - Grate area: 16.9 sq ft (1.57 m^{2})
- Boiler pressure: 200 lbf/in^{2} (1,379 kPa)
- Heating surface: 738 sq ft (68.6 m^{2})
- Cylinders: Two, outside
- Cylinder size: 14 in × 22 in (356 mm × 559 mm)
Performance figures
- Tractive effort: 15,330 lbf (68.19 kN)
Career
- Operators: NZR
- Locale: All of New Zealand

The NZR W^{G} class was a development of the preceding W^{F} class of all purpose tank locomotive. Later in their careers most (14) were rebuilt as W^{W} class. The locomotives were designed by A. L. Beattie, who described them as a "large tank locomotive."

== In service ==
The locomotives were used on suburban trains in Wellington and Auckland.

=== Rimutaka Incline ===
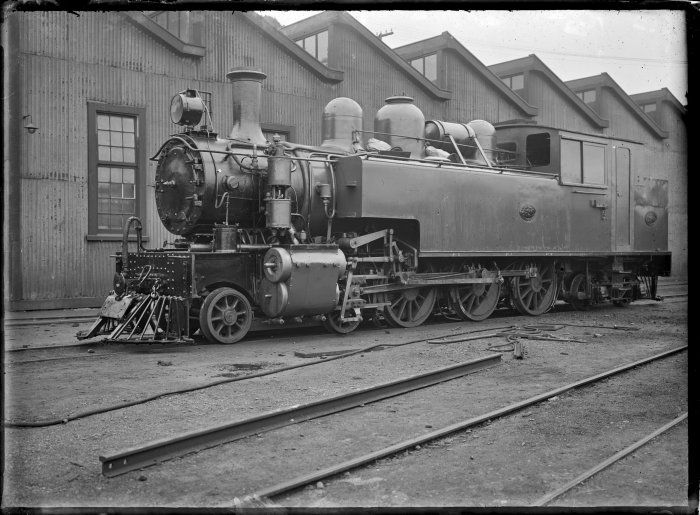
1917 photograph of W^{G} 480, Godber Collection, Alexander Turnbull Library.

W^{G} 480 was built by New Zealand Railways at Hillside (maker's no 104/10), and entered service in October 1910. It was altered for use on the Rimutaka Incline to assist the "Fell" locomotives cope with the military traffic to and from the New Zealand Expeditionary Forces training camp at Featherston. The cowcatchers were altered to clear the high Fell centre rail, and it had an acetylene headlamp arranged to follow the alignment of the track on curves. The locomotive was written off in June 1969, and preserved at the Glenbrook Vintage Railway.

== Withdrawals ==
All of the locomotives were withdrawn by 1956.

== See also ==
- NZR W class
- NZR W^{A} class
- NZR W^{B} class
- NZR W^{D} class
- NZR W^{E} class
- NZR W^{F} class
- NZR W^{W} class
- NZR W^{S} / W^{AB} class
- Locomotives of New Zealand
