= NZR W class =

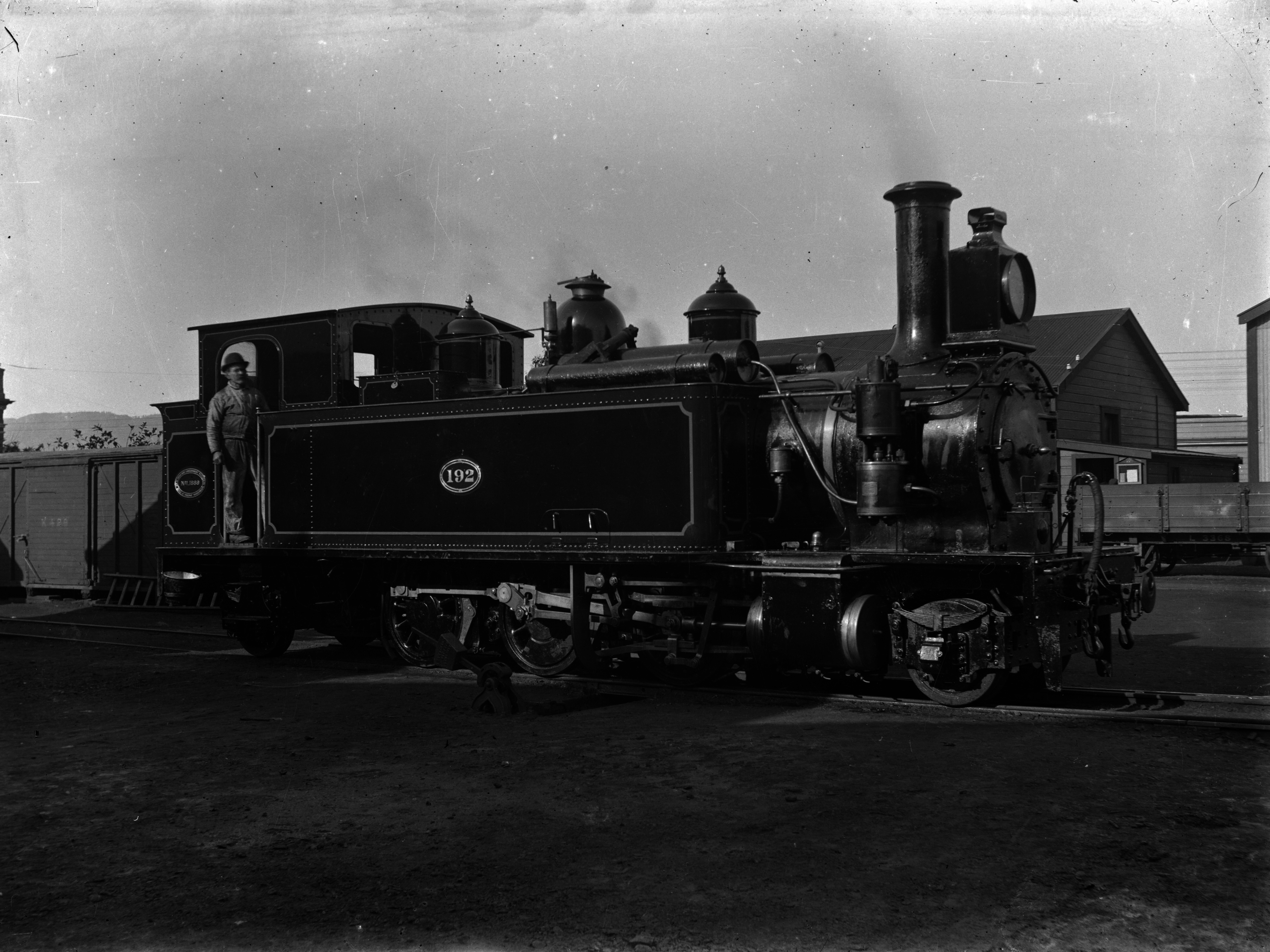
- W class steam locomotive no. 192
Type and origin
- Power type: Steam
- Builder: NZR Addington Workshops, Christchurch (2)
- Build date: 1889 - 1891
Specifications
- Configuration
  - Whyte: 2-6-2T
- Gauge: 3 ft 6 in (1,067 mm)
- Wheel diameter: 36.5 in (0.927 m)
- Wheelbase: 22 ft 3 in (6.78 m)
- Length: 29 ft 5 in (8.97 m)
- Adhesive weight: 26.2 long tons (26.6 t; 29.3 short tons)
- Loco weight: 37.3 long tons (37.9 tonnes; 41.8 short tons)
- Fuel type: Coal
- Fuel capacity: 1.8 long tons (1.8 t; 2.0 short tons)
- Water cap.: 900 imp gal (4,100 L; 1,100 US gal)
- Firebox
  - Grate area: 12 sq ft (1.1 m^{2})
- Boiler pressure: 150 psi (1,034 kPa)
- Heating surface: 683 sq ft (63.5 m^{2})
- Cylinders: Two
- Cylinder size: 14 in × 20 in (356 mm × 508 mm)
Performance figures
- Tractive effort: 12,888 lbf (57.33 kN)
Career
- Number in class: 2
- Numbers: 192 - 238
- Locale: All of New Zealand
- First run: 1889 - 1891
- Retired: 1959
- Scrapped: 1959
- Current owner: Rail Heritage Trust of New Zealand (1)
- Disposition: Withdrawn, 1 preserved

The NZR W class consisted of two steam locomotives built at the Addington Railway Workshops in Christchurch, New Zealand by the New Zealand Railways Department (NZR). They were the first locomotives to be built by NZR.

Almost all subsequent tank locomotive classes built by NZR were classified as sub-classes of the W class, e.g. W^{A}, W^{AB}, W^{B}. The only exception was the Y class.

== Introduction ==
The class originated from proposals to build tank locomotives from parts imported for the original J class. The design evolved into completely New Zealand built locomotives.

== Preserved locomotives ==
After withdrawal, W 192 was stored at Hillside Workshops until 1962 when the New Zealand Railways Department used it for promotions. In 1964, it was placed in storage in Arthurs Pass. In 1973, it was restored as a static display for the NZR. But in 1979, it was restored to operational condition and used in places with F 163 including shuttle trains in Wellington. In 1988, it was used hauling trains from Christchurch to Rangiora for a week for the Ferrymead 125 celebrations.

One of the days it was taken out of service for repairs to her firebox and was replaced by C 864, but returned to service the following day. In 1992, W 192 was leased to the Ashburton Railway & Preservation Society for uses on their former Mount Somers Branchline at The Plains Vintage Railway & Historical Museum. In 1993, the NZR sold 192 to the Railway Heritage Trust of New Zealand. On 16 and 17 September 1995, the W took part at the 1995 Waipara Vintage Festival held by the Weka Pass Railway. After the festival, it was returned to The Plains Railway. It was sent again to Waipara for the 1997 festival then repeated again in 1999. During the 1999 festival it developed minor boiler issues and only ran one trip to Waikari from Glenmark, but only ran in more minor roles. In 2001, it was transported to the Linwood Locomotive Depot from The Plains and placed into storage. On 7 October 2003, it was announced by the Rail Heritage Trust of New Zealand it would be on long-term loan to the Canterbury Railway Society for uses at the Ferrymead Heritage Park. It arrived during the same month just in time for the 140th Railway celebrations at Ferrymead.

== See also ==
- NZR W^{A} class
- NZR W^{B} class
- NZR W^{D} class
- NZR W^{E} class
- NZR W^{F} class
- NZR W^{G} class
- NZR W^{W} class
- NZR W^{S} / W^{AB} class
- Locomotives of New Zealand
