= Ngahere =

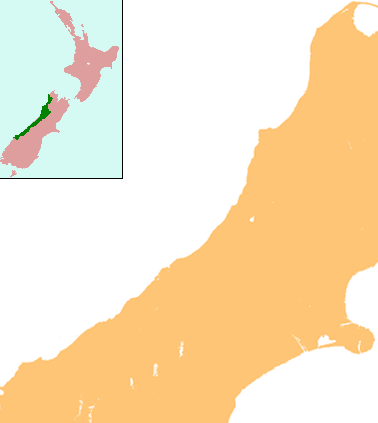
- Coordinates: 42°23′57″S 171°26′16″E
- Country: New Zealand
- Region: West Coast
- District: Grey District

Population (2013)
  - Total: 363

Ngahere is a locality in the Grey District of the West Coast of New Zealand's South Island. The 2013 New Zealand census gave the population of Ngahere and its surrounding area as 363, an increase of 5.2% or 18 people since the 2006 census. Ngahere is located on the south bank of the Grey River, and State Highway 7 and the Stillwater–Westport Line (SWL) railway pass through the village.

== Railway ==
The railway reached Ngahere when an extension was built from Brunner on 1 August 1889, and it was the line's terminus until a further section to Ahaura was opened on 14 February 1890. On 1 August 1910, Ngahere became a railway junction when the Blackball Branch was opened, and this branch line operated until a flood in 1966 destroyed its bridge across the Grey River. The branch was formally closed on 21 February 1966. The next year, passenger trains through Ngahere on the SWL were cancelled; since this time, freight trains of coal have been the predominant traffic through Ngahere.

== Churches ==
=== Sacred Heart Church ===
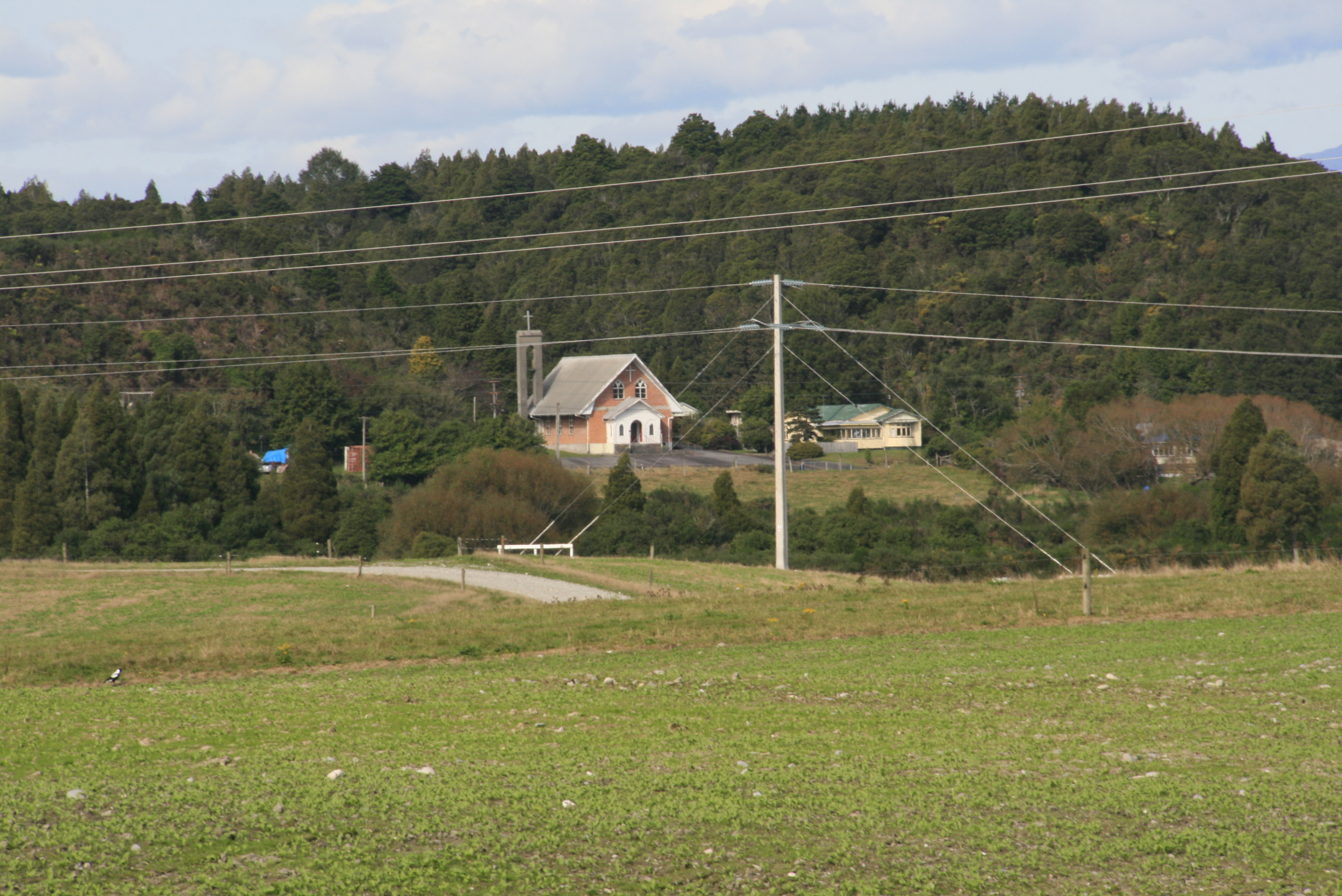
Distant view of Sacred Heart Church, 2012

Sacred Heart Church is a Catholic church in Ngahere, within the Greymouth St Patrick's parish. The church was built in 1960, to replace an earlier church of the same name. Originally erected as St Patrick's in the gold-mining settlement of Notown in 1866, the kitset kauri church was relocated to Ngahere in 1922 after Notown had become a ghost town, and was relocated again to Shantytown Heritage Park after the present Sacred Heart Church was built.

=== St Luke's ===
St Luke's is a small former Anglican church, opposite the Ngahere sawmill on State Highway 7, built in timber to plans from Ralph Tyler of Greymouth. The foundation stone was laid on 21 September 1952 by the Bishop of Nelson, Percival Stephenson, and the church was dedicated in 1954. The church was sold in about 2010.
