= NZR J class (1874) =

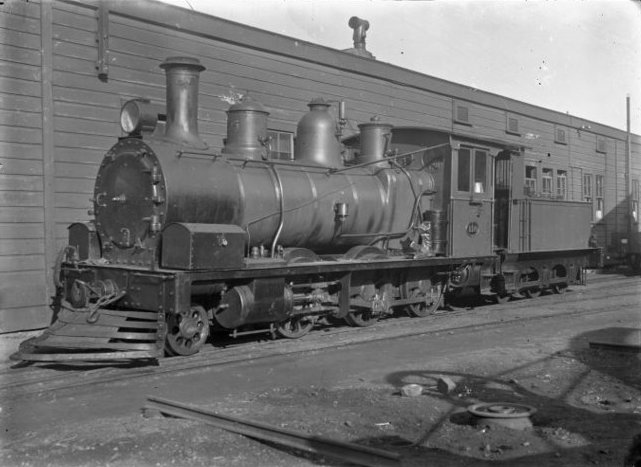
- J class steam locomotive, NZR 118, 2-6-0 type at Petone Workshops circa 1924. Alexander Turnbull Library, Wellington, New Zealand.
Type and origin
- Power type: Steam
- Builder: Avonside Engine Co. (6), Neilson & Co. (5), Robert Stephenson & Co. (5), Dübs & Co. (4), Vulcan Foundry (13)
- Serial number: Avonside 1038–1043; Dübs 1212–1215; Neilson 2060–264; RS 2367–2361; VF 998–1009, 1076
- Build date: 1874 (6), 1879 (10), 1883 (12), 1884 (1)
- Total produced: 33
Specifications
- Configuration
  - Whyte: 2-6-0
  - UIC: 1'C
- Gauge: 3 ft 6 in (1,067 mm)
- Driver dia.: 42 in (1.067 m)
- Length: 41 ft 0 1/2 in (12.51 m)
- Adhesive weight: 17.5 long tons (17.8 t; 19.6 short tons)
- Loco weight: 21.0 long tons (21.3 t; 23.5 short tons)
- Tender weight: 17.0 long tons (17.3 t; 19.0 short tons)
- Fuel type: Coal
- Fuel capacity: 3.0 long tons (3.0 t; 3.4 short tons)
- Water cap.: 1,150 imperial gallons (5,200 L; 1,380 US gal)
- Firebox
  - Grate area: 12 sq ft (1.1 m^{2})
- Boiler pressure: 130 psi (0.90 MPa)
- Heating surface: 683 sq ft (63.5 m^{2})
- Cylinders: Two, outside
- Cylinder size: 14 in × 20 in (356 mm × 508 mm)
Performance figures
- Tractive effort: 9,707 lbf (43.18 kN)
Career
- Operators: New Zealand Government Railways
- Class: J
- Withdrawn: 1919–1935
- Disposition: 1 lost at sea during delivery, 4 rebuilt to W^{A} class, remainder dumped

The NZR J class were steam locomotives with the wheel arrangement of 2-6-0 that were built in 1874 to operate on the New Zealand Railways (NZR). The J class was the first class of locomotive in New Zealand to have a tender; all previous classes were tank engines.

== Introduction ==
The first batch built consisted of six locomotives built by the Avonside Engine Company and they entered service in 1874 in Canterbury. Ten more were built in 1879, with a dozen more from Vulcan Foundry in 1883. One was lost at sea while being delivered, and a replacement was built the following year.

== Service ==
They spread beyond Canterbury and could also be found working in Auckland, Waikato, and Hawke's Bay. The J class worked well whether it was pulling a long goods train or operating important passenger services in the early days of the Main South Line, but as traffic increased, it was superseded by more powerful locomotives and in 1917-18, four members of the class were converted to 2-6-2 tank engines (the W^{A} class) to perform shunting duties in yards.

== Withdrawals ==
By 1935, all 32 original J class locomotives had reached the end of their usefulness and were discarded, and none survived to be preserved.

== Surviving relics ==
Although none were preserved, relics of J class locomotives can still be seen to this day at sites where NZR dumped withdrawn equipment. A locomotive dump at Oamaru had five J class engines dumped there, J's 15, 82, 83, 116, and 117, although most of these were removed from the seawall by protection works carried out by ONTRACK in 2008—2009. This dump was also the location of W^{A} 120, which was one of the J's rebuilt as tank engines. Elsewhere, J 61 was dumped without cylinders at Branxholme and other miscellaneous components, large and small were dumped in other dump site locations.
