= New Zealand Railway and Locomotive Society =

- Abbreviation: NZR&LS
- Predecessor: New Zealand Railway Correspondence Society
- Formation: Incorporated as a society: 31 July 1958; 68 years ago
- Type: Incorporated Society
- Headquarters: Petone, Wellington
- President: Graeme Carter
- Affiliations: Federation of Rail Organisations of New Zealand
- Website: railsoc.org.nz

The New Zealand Railway and Locomotive Society Inc is a society of railway enthusiasts, based in Wellington. It was incorporated in 1958.

The society archives are in the Thomas McGavin Building on Ava railway station's former goods yard in the Hutt Valley. At one time an old railway carriage held at the Ngaio railway station was used.

== Publications ==
The society publishes a magazine, the New Zealand Railway Observer (ISSN 0028-8624), that was first published by the New Zealand Railway Correspondence Society on a Gestetner in 1944, and a newsletter Turntable. The society publishes books on railway subjects. There are about 25 books available, as listed on the website. Most are about New Zealand railways, but there is a book Cane Trains about railways in Fiji.

== Rolling stock ==
The society owns steam locomotives A^{B} 608, W^{AB} 794 and X 442, Wellington & Manawatu Railway carriages 42, 48 and 52, as well as NZR 4-wheel KP goods wagon and NZR 4-wheel Q coal wagon.

== Associated groups ==
The New Zealand Model Railway Guild was formed from the model railway section of the society. The Guild was incorporated as a separate incorporated society in 1967.
