= Addington Railway Workshops =

New Zealand railway workshops

Coordinates: 43°32′22″S 172°36′28″E

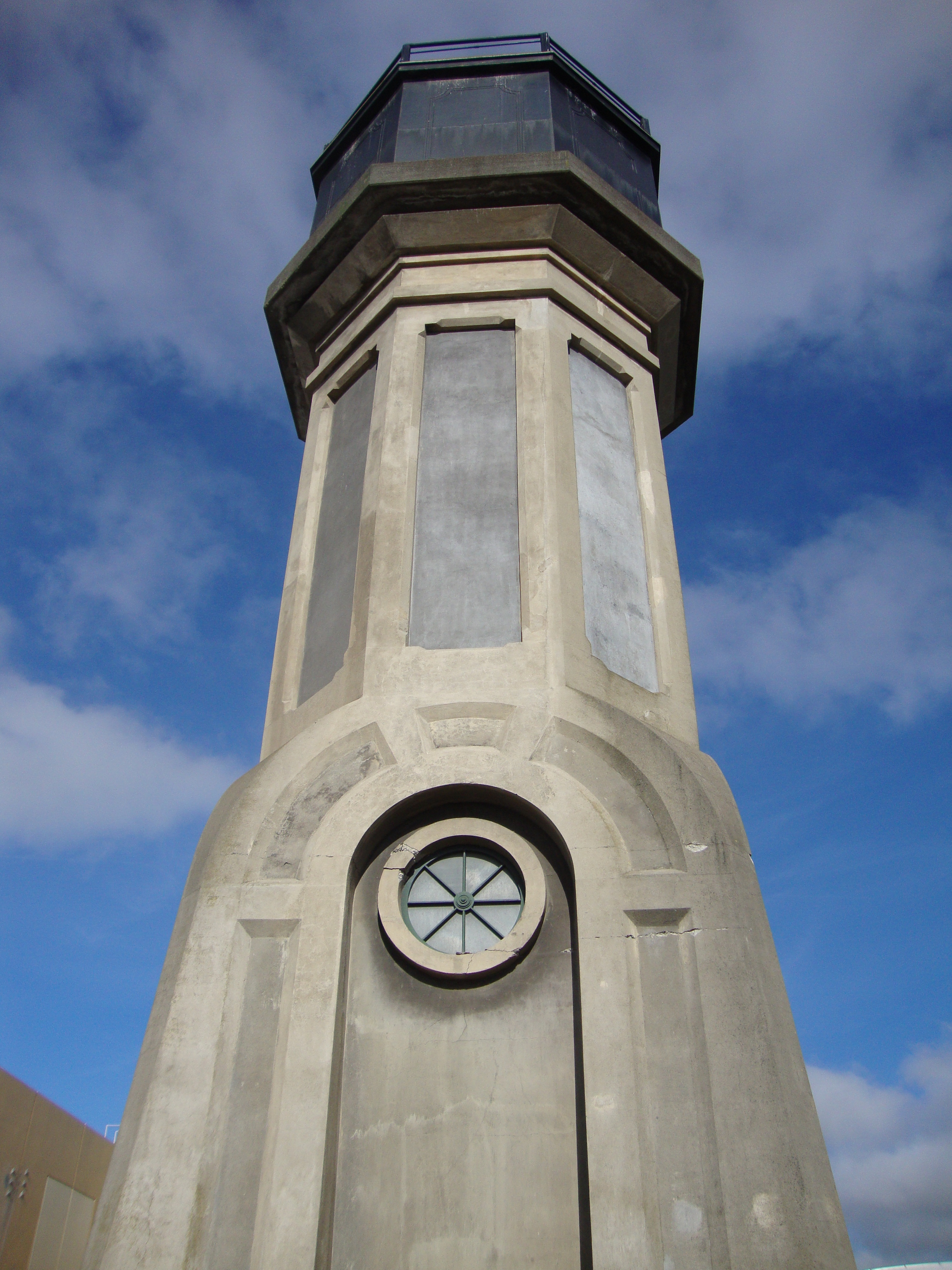
Addington Water Tower with some damage from the February 2011 Christchurch earthquake

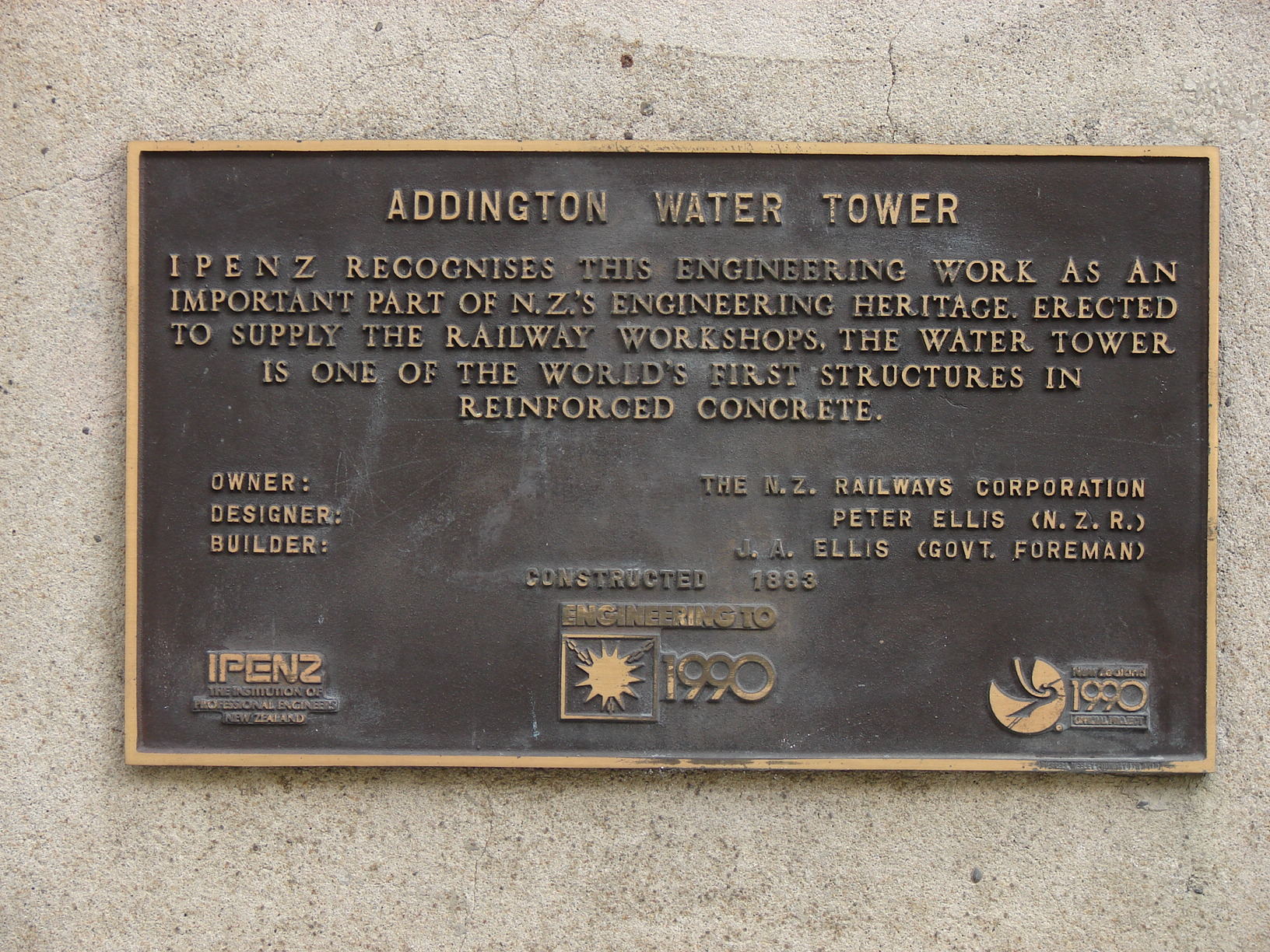
Water tower plaque.

The Addington Railway Workshops was a major railway workshops established in the Christchurch suburb of Addington in 1877 by the Public Works Department, and transferred in 1880 to the newly formed New Zealand Railways Department (NZR). The workshops closed in 1990.

In 2026 a new NZR South Island rail servicing facility was opened at Waltham.

== History ==
Addington Railway Workshops were opened in 1877 to overhaul and construct railway equipment, and to assemble locomotives being imported from England. The distinctive water tower, an early example of reinforced concrete construction, was built with prison labour. In 1889, the workshops were responsible for building the first locomotive to be built by NZR, W 192, and continued to build locomotives up to the early 1920s. As well as railway work, Addington also undertook contract work such as the manufacture of gold dredge components; during the First World War, the workshops produced military equipment including aeroplane components.

During the 1920s, Addington was re-geared to manufacture and overhaul rolling stock, although it continued to carry out limited overhauls on steam locomotives and the E^{C} and E^{O} class electric locomotives. Limited locomotive construction resumed in 1962 with the construction of the D^{SC} class centre-cab shunting locomotives. Addington also assembled the Mitsubishi D^{SA} and D^{SB} class diesel-hydraulic shunting locomotives in 1967-68 and four of the five Toshiba DSJ class centre-cab shunters in 1984.

Due to the rationalisation of the New Zealand Railways Corporation following deregulation in 1981, Addington Workshops closed on 14 December 1990. The site was cleared with the exception of the former water tower; due to changes in freight handling the Main North Line was realigned across the former works entrance, while a new Christchurch Railway Station was opened on this site along the realigned stretch of track on 5 April 1993, replacing the former Christchurch railway station on Moorhouse Avenue in central Christchurch.

The remainder of the site was sold to Ngāi Tahu for redevelopment as a shopping centre, named Tower Junction after the former workshops water tower. The Addington Water Tower is registered with Heritage New Zealand as a Category I heritage building, registration number 5390.

=== Locomotive classes built at Addington ===
- A (8)
- A^{B} (38)
- B (6)
- B^{A} (10)
- D^{SC}
- DSJ
- E^{D} (2)
- F^{A}
- U
- W (2)
- W^{A}
- W^{AB} (2)
- W^{F} (10)
- X (18)

== See also ==
- List of Christchurch railway stations § Addington
- New Zealand Railways Department
