= NZR RM class (Red Terror) =

NZR RM class General Manager's Inspection Railcar – Red Terror
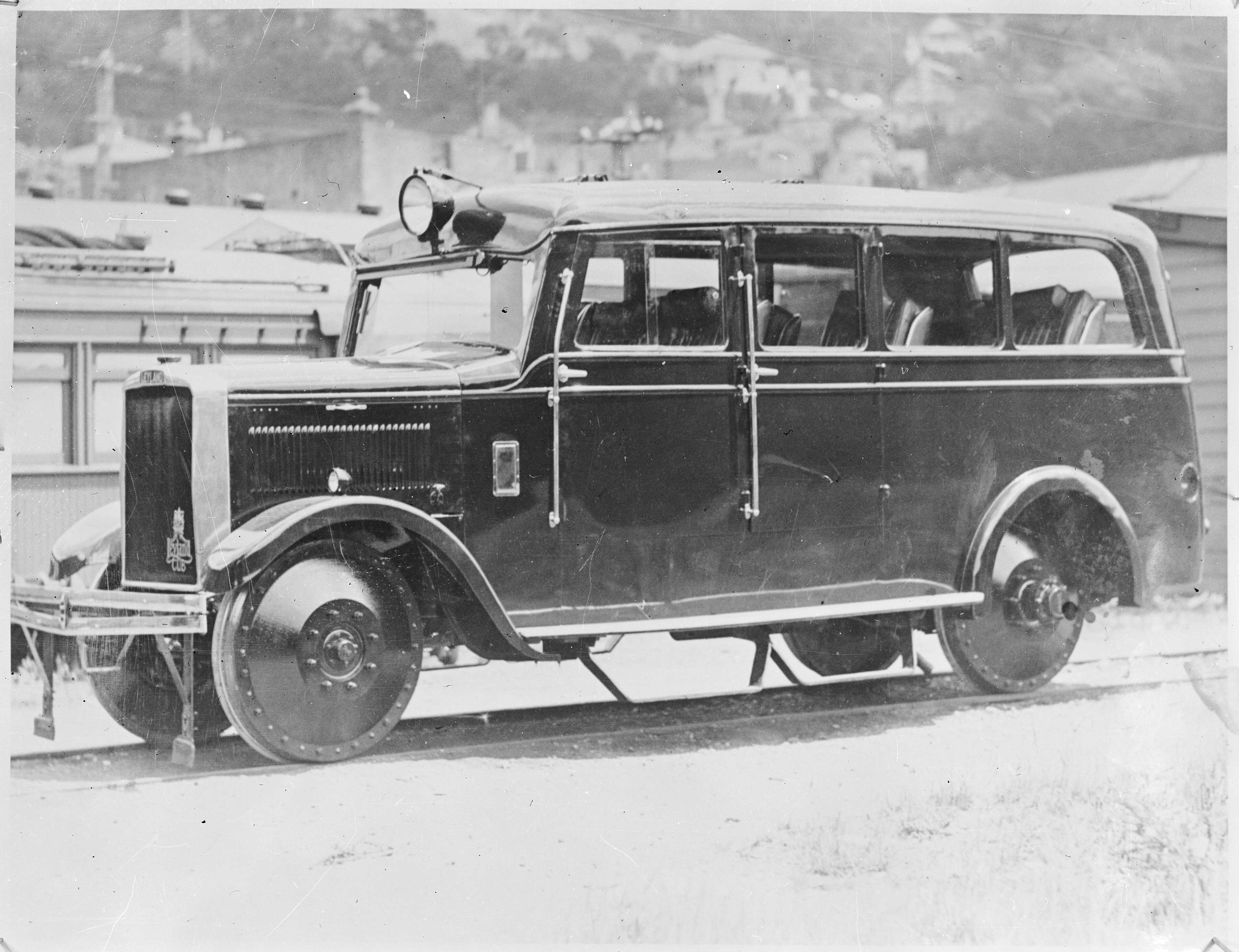
- "Red Terror", the railcar used by the General Manager of New Zealand Railways
- In service: 1934–1940
- Manufacturer: New Zealand Railways
- Built at: Hutt Workshops
- Constructed: 1934
- Entered service: February 1934
- Scrapped: 1941 converted into Overhead Inspection Platform Vehicle
- Number built: 1
- Number in service: None
- Fleet numbers: RM 1
- Capacity: 7 passengers plus driver
- Operator: New Zealand Railways
- Lines served: All New Zealand main and branch lines

Specifications
- Car length: 18 ft 3.5 in (5.58 m) over bumpers
- Width: 5 ft 6 in (1.68 m) over body
- Maximum speed: 60 mph (97 km/h)
- Prime movers: Leyland 4.4 litre (268 cu); 6-cylinder petrol engine
- Power output: 60 hp (45 kW)
- Transmission: Mechanical
- UIC classification: 1-A
- Track gauge: 3 ft 6 in (1,067 mm)

The Red Terror was a four-wheel railcar built in 1934 and used by the general manager of New Zealand Railways, Garnet Mackley, for six years for inspections of the railway system, and to demonstrate the potential for using petrol- and diesel-powered railcars in New Zealand. The railcar could carry 7 people plus the driver. It was given the classification RM 1.

== Background ==
From 1906 to around 1930, New Zealand Railways had been experimenting with ways to provide for fast passenger services where numbers of passengers were too few to warrant a full passenger train. 'One locomotive and one carriage' combinations were tried in 1906 and 1929 but proved unsuccessful. A long succession of railcars (including petrol-engined, petrol-electric, battery-electric, and steam) was tried from 1912, but these were all mechanically unreliable, mechanically unsuitable, or uneconomic.

Garnet Mackley was appointed assistant general manager of New Zealand Railways on 1 December 1931, acting general manager in November 1932, and general manager on 1 May 1933. He had to "win approval" for the construction of the inspection car that became known as the Red Terror.

A small Ford touring car that had been "mounted on two axles and used as an inspection car" had led to the building of the managerial inspection car, the Red Terror.

== Description ==
The Red Terror was built at the NZR Hutt Workshops on a Leyland Cub chassis. It was powered by a Leyland six cylinder petrol engine, had a 4-forward, 1-reverse, gearbox, a cruising speed of 50 mph (80 km/h), and a maximum speed of 60 mph (100 km/h). The vehicle had a turntable mounted beneath it, which could be lowered onto the track surface, allowing the car to be lifted up and turned by hand to face the other direction.

The name "Red Terror" came from a staff member watching it run through a station during trials. He exclaimed, "A blooming Phar Lap! The Red Terror! That's what she is" – a reference to an alternative name for the famous racehorse of that time. The name stuck, at least in part because of its role in carrying the general manager and other senior staff on inspections of the railway network. A contemporary writer explained, "The name is a combination of respect and affection. It neatly describes the instrument which enabled a man of Mr Mackley's endless untiring energy to cover the territory in the most unexpected fashion, so that he might arrive anywhere at any time." The car was not known by any other name by railway staff.

== Service ==
Following successful trial runs on 9 and 21 January 1934, the railcar was used for an inspection tour of the North Island by Mackley in February 1934.

After the 5 March 1934 Paihiatua (Horoeka) Earthquake, the "new rail-car was immediately requisitioned" so that the Chief Engineer and inspecting officers could travel through the Wairarapa, Hawke's Bay, and Manawatu districts to inspect, and where necessary test, track and structures such as bridges, tunnels and culverts.

The railcar was then taken to Bluff by sea for inspection tours of the South Island. By September 1934 Mackley reported that he had travelled over 7000 miles (11,250 km) in the railcar and had "made a comprehensive personal inspection of the whole railway service." This included having travelled over every main and branch line in the North Island and South Island railway networks in the Red Terror. At each location he visited, he talked with local business interests to better understand their needs. By mid-1936 the railcar had completed over 30,000 miles (48,250 km) in service.

The vehicle demonstrated a previously unobtainable speed of travel. An example of note at the time was of a politician, MP and former Prime Minister, George Forbes, who was able in a single day to travel in the railcar from Wellington to Napier, address a conference there, and then return to Wellington.

== Conversion and preservation ==
Once the practicality of railcars had been demonstrated – the two Midland, seven Wairarapa, and six Standard railcars having been built and proved in service – the Red Terror had served its primary purpose. Also, Mackley retired on 31 January 1940.

The Red Terror was rebuilt in 1941 into an overhead inspection platform vehicle, and reclassified PW 2. Based at Otira, it was used until 1996 for maintaining the 1500 V DC overhead for the electrified section of railway between Arthur's Pass and Otira, including the Otira Tunnel.

In 1996 the vehicle was transferred to Ferrymead Heritage Railway at Christchurch for preservation.
