= NZR RM class (Leyland petrol) =

Leyland petrol railcar (experimental)
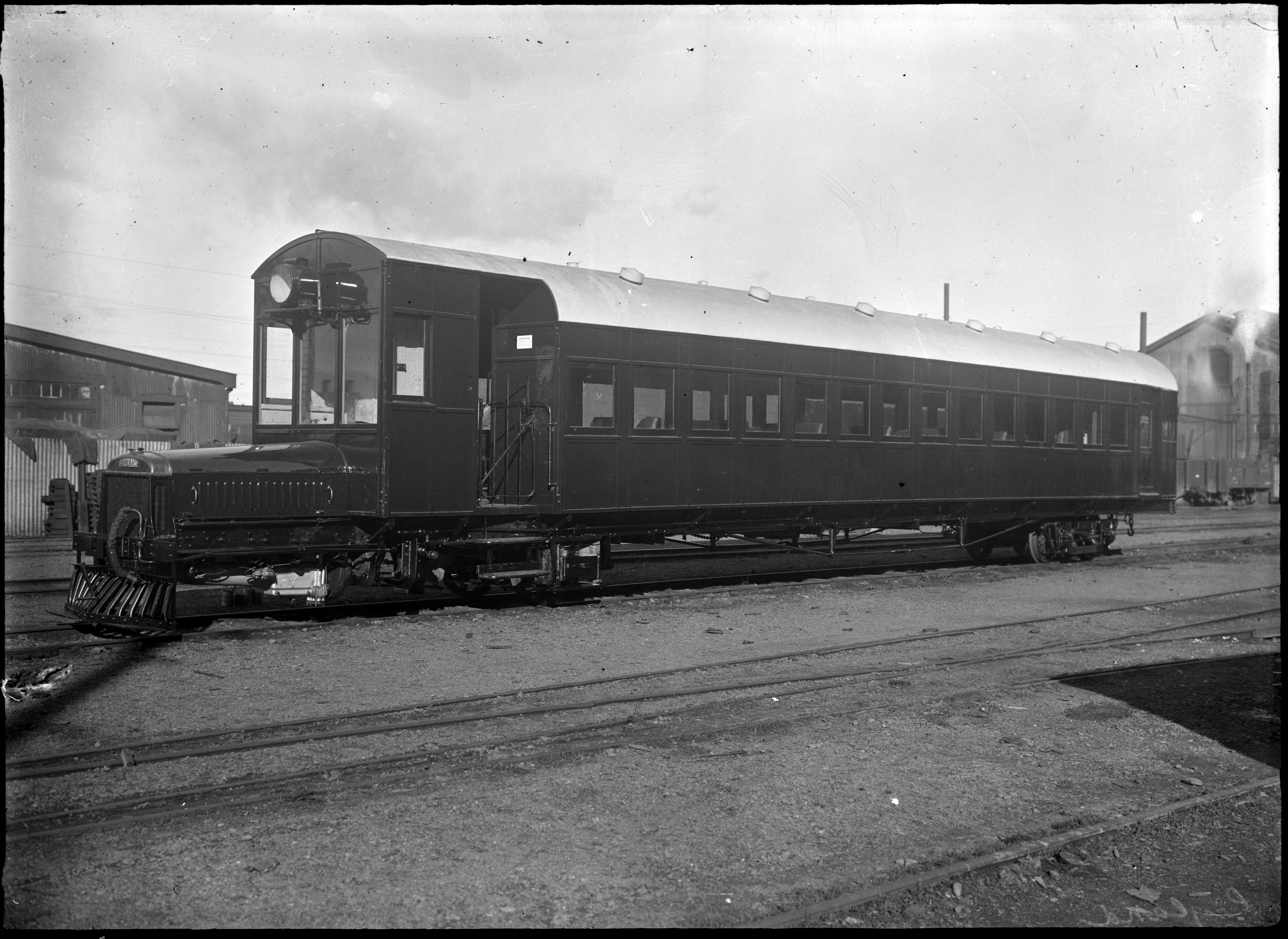
- Leyland petrol railcar, photographed at Petone Railway Workshops in 1925
Type and origin
- Builder: NZR Hutt Workshops
- Build date: 1925
Specifications
- Gauge: 3 ft 6 in (1,067 mm)
- Fuel type: Petrol
Career
- Number in class: 1
- First run: June 1925

The NZR RM class Leyland petrol railcar was an experimental railcar built and trialled in New Zealand in 1925 by New Zealand Railways (NZR). It should not be confused with the two much smaller Leyland diesel railbuses of 1936.

== Background ==
New Zealand's experimentation with railcars began in 1912 with the use of a MacEwan-Pratt petrol railcar. NZR, which ran the national rail network, was looking for ways to run rural passenger services with as little expense as possible, but at the same time presenting an attractive form of transport to passengers. Many rural branch lines at the time ran "mixed" trains that carried both passengers and freight and were not particularly popular due to the slow schedule that resulted from loading and unloading goods during the journey. NZR saw the use of railcars as a potential means of providing cheap and efficient rural passenger travel, and as railcar technology was not very well developed at the time, engineers experimented with new ideas and various styles.

== Construction ==
The Leyland petrol railcar was an experimental railcar, designed in 1925 and built that year at NZR's Petone Workshops. The railcar was essentially a regular passenger carriage with a driving cab installed at one end; a Leyland petrol engine with an output of 60-75 kW was positioned in a front housing that extended some four metres in front of the cab. The wheel arrangement was A-2, with the leading single axle under the cab and the bogie located at the rear end. Sixty-two passengers could be accommodated inside the 19-metre long railcar.

== Trials ==
After construction, the railcar was put into trials to see whether it was suitable for use on regular passenger trains. It ultimately failed the trials and was never utilised on revenue service. Nonetheless, lessons were learnt and it was an important step in local railcar development, and railcar research in New Zealand continued to progress. The year after the Leyland's trials arguably the first successful railcar was built, the Edison battery-electric railcar that ran for eight years on the Little River Branch before its destruction by fire.
