= NZR RM class =

Classification given to railcars

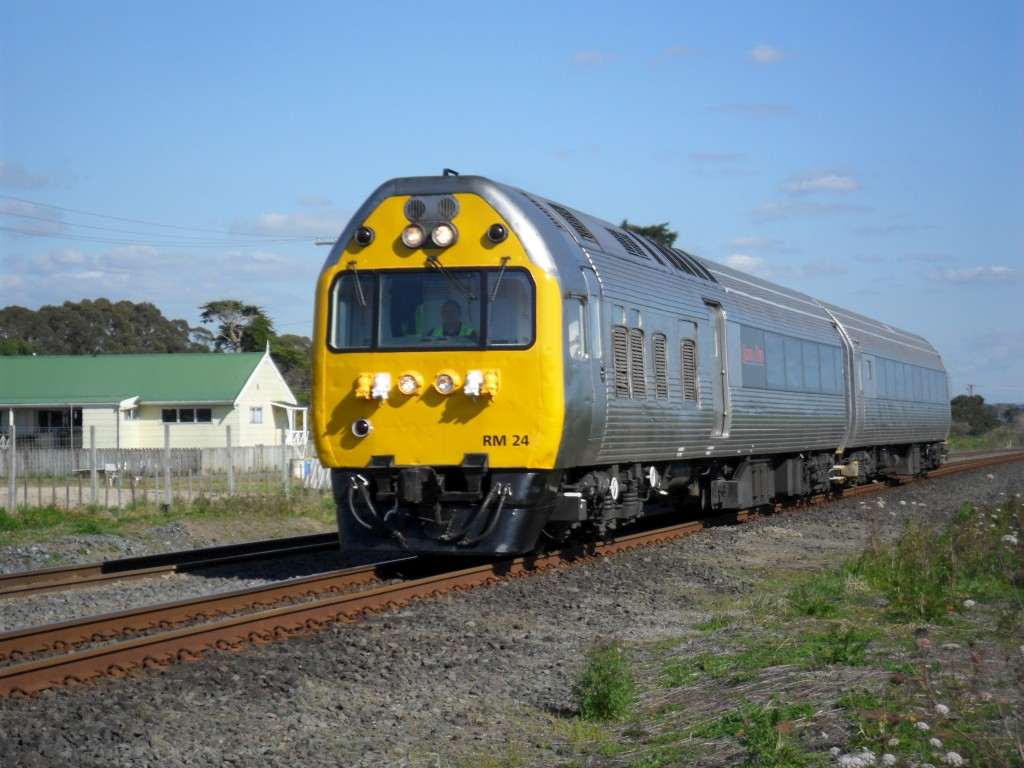
The last type of railcar in regular service in New Zealand to use the "RM" classification was the Silver Fern railcars.

The RM class was the classification used by the New Zealand Railways Department (NZR) and its successors gave to most railcars and railbuses that have operated on New Zealand's national rail network. "RM" stands for Rail Motor which was the common name at the turn of the 20th century for what became known in New Zealand as railcars. As many types of railcars are operated, class names have been given to each railcar type to differentiate them from others.

== Experimental and early railcars ==
In the early 20th century, NZR began investigating railcar technology to provide profitable and efficient passenger services on regional routes and rural branch lines where carriage trains were not economic and "mixed" trains (passenger carriage(s) attached to freight trains) were undesirably slow.

A number of experimental railcars and railbuses were developed:

- 1912: RM1 MacEwan-Pratt petrol railcar - the first railcar to operate in New Zealand
- 1914: RM1 (number re-used) Westinghouse petrol-electric railcar
- 1916: RM2 Thomas Transmission petrol-electric railcar
- 1924: A88 Buckhurst petrol carriage railcar (not officially a member of the RM class)
- 1925: Leyland petrol railcar
- 1925: RM4 and RM5 Model T Ford railbus
- 1925: Sentinel-Cammell steam railcar
- 1926: Clayton steam railcar
- 1926: RM6 Edison battery-electric railcar
- 1934: RM1 (number re-used) Red Terror railcar

The most successful of the experimental and early railcars was the Edison battery-electric railcar, which provided a popular twice-daily service on the Little River Branch line in Canterbury. It may have been expanded into a full fleet of railcars had the economic difficulties of the Great Depression not intervened, and it was destroyed by a depot fire in 1934 and not replaced.

== Railcar classes ==
The first truly successful railcar classes to enter revenue service in New Zealand were the Midland and Wairarapa classes that began operating in 1936, following the building of the Red Terror (an 8-seat inspection railcar) for the General Manager, Garnet Mackley, in 1934. More classes followed over the years, primarily to operate regional services. The various classes were:

- 1936: RM20 and RM21 Midland railcar (or small railbus)
- 1936: RM4–RM10 Wairarapa railcar (or large railbus) – specially designed to operate over the Rimutaka Incline
- 1938: RM30–RM35 Standard railcar – North Island only
- 1940: RM50–RM59 Vulcan railcar – South Island only
- 1955: RM100–RM134 88 seater railcar – also known as Articulateds, Drewrys, Fiats, or twinsets, New Zealand's most numerous railcar class
- 1972: RM1, RM2, RM3 (later redesignated RM18, RM24, RM30 after introduction of TMS) Silver Fern railcar

The Silver Ferns were the only railcars to survive into the privatisation era of Tranz Rail and Toll Rail, and later re-nationalisation as KiwiRail. They were introduced to provide a premier service on the North Island Main Trunk between Wellington and Auckland, and after they were replaced by the Overlander locomotive-hauled carriage train in 1991, they were redeployed to operate the Geyserland Express between Auckland and Rotorua, Kaimai Express between Auckland and Tauranga, and Waikato Connection between Hamilton and Auckland. When those services were cancelled in 2001, the Silver Ferns were transferred to Auckland and operated suburban services for the Auckland Regional Transport Authority between Britomart and Pukekohe station. The Silver Ferns were then only used for special charter services and were withdrawn in 2019.

== Speed records ==
The fastest speed officially achieved on New Zealand's railway network was attained by a Vulcan railcar. On a trial run on 25 October 1940, the speed of 125.5 kilometres per hour (78.0 mph) was achieved on a flat stretch of the Midland Line east of Springfield.

In September 1938 Standard railcar RM 30 covered the 321 km between Napier and Wellington in 4 hours and 36 minutes running time. In 1967 RM 30 took a group of railway enthusiasts from Auckland to Wellington in 9 hours and 26 minutes (running time 8 hours and 42 minutes).

The Wairarapa railcars hold the fastest speeds for operations over the Rimutaka Incline. Passenger services were previously slow trains operated by the H class locomotives specially built to operate on the Fell mountain railway system employed on the Incline. The Wairarapa railcars were designed to operate unaided on the Incline, and as they were lighter and more nimble, they achieved speeds well in excess of any service operated by an H class (or any of the few other engines occasionally permitted to work on the Incline).

== Preservation ==
None of the experimental or early railcars survived to be preserved, but the Pleasant Point Museum and Railway operates a Model T Ford replica and possesses the unrestored body of one of the original Model T railcars.

At least one member of all of the main railcar classes has been saved for preservation. For many years, it was feared that no 88-seater would be preserved, but the Pahiatua Railcar Society has successfully recovered one and is actively seeking to return it to operational condition. The same society is in possession of the sole surviving Wairarapa railcar and is restoring it to operational condition. Four of the nine Vulcan railcars are preserved, one by the Plains Vintage Railway and three by the Ferrymead Railway. Four of the six Standard railcars are also preserved, two by the Silver Stream Railway, one by the Pahiatua Railcar Society (their active railcar), and one by private interests in the Waikato stored at the Glenbrook Vintage Railway.

All three Silver Ferns are being preserved by the Pahiatua Railcar Society which bought them in 2020.
