= NZR RM class (88 seater) =

Class of New Zealand railcars

NZR RM class Articulated 88-Seater
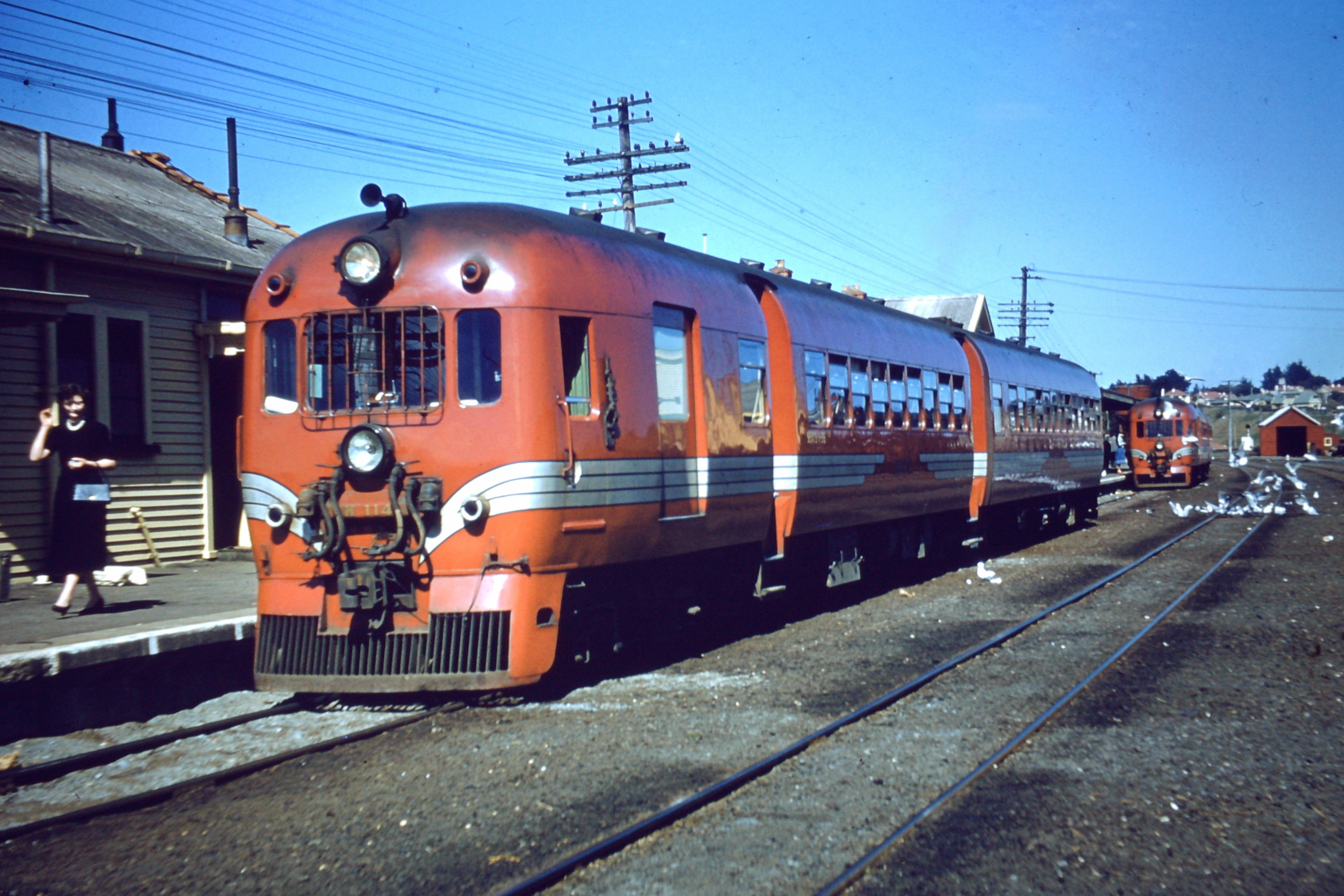
- 88-Seater railcar RM 114 at Kaikōura Railway Station during the 1960s.
- In service: 6 April 1955 – 22 May 1978
- Manufacturer: Drewry Car Co, England
- Built at: Birmingham Railway Carriage & Wagon Co, Smethwick, UK
- Entered service: 1955–1958
- Scrapped: 1978
- Number built: 35
- Number in service: 0
- Number scrapped: 33.5
- Formation: No 1 end (36 passengers & luggage compartment) articulated over a Jacobs bogie with No 2 end (52 passengers)
- Fleet numbers: RM 100 – RM 134
- Capacity: 88 passengers
- Operators: New Zealand Railways
- Lines served: Many main and branch lines

Specifications
- Train length: 105 ft (32.00 m) total
- Width: 8 ft 10 in (2.69 m)
- Maximum speed: 65 mph (105 km/h)
- Weight: 63.1 long tons (64.1 t; 70.7 short tons)
- Prime mover(s): Two Fiat 700.040, six cylinder, horizontal underfloor, 1500 rpm naturally aspirated
- Power output: 420 hp (310 kW) total (original); 370 hp (280 kW) (derated)
- Transmission: Wilson 5-speed gearbox (per engine)
- UIC classification: Bo–2–Bo
- Track gauge: 3 ft 6 in (1,067 mm)

The NZR RM class 88-Seaters were a class of railcar used in New Zealand. (Note: The railcars were initially meant to be known as the "Rimutaka" class, but once in service went by a number of unofficial names, such as "Articulated", "88-Seaters", "Eighty Eights", "Twinsets", "Drewrys" or "Fiats".) New Zealand Government Railways (NZR) classified them as RM (Rail Motor), (Note: Until the 1930s, "Rail Motor" was the more common name for railcar) the notation used for all railcars, numbering the 35 sets from RM100 to RM134. They were the most numerous railcars in NZR service. Their purchase and introduction saw the demise of steam-hauled provincial passenger trains and mixed trains, and was part of a deliberate effort to modernise NZR passenger services at a time of increasing competition from private motor vehicles. Being diesel powered and lighter the railcars were less expensive to operate and able to maintain quicker timetables, although they became plagued with mechanical and electrical problems, with a number of the classes eventually being turned into depowered locomotive-hauled carriages and reclassified as the AC class "Grassgrubs".

== Background ==
In the early 1950s, NZR was in the process of replacing steam traction with diesel and modernising the railways to cope with vastly increased traffic, the after-effects of wartime stringency, and increasing competition from motor vehicles and aeroplanes. As part of this modernisation process, it was decided to upgrade provincial passenger services, which were provided by a combination of steam-hauled passenger trains that operated several times a week, and "mixed" trains that carried both freight and passengers. NZR had experimented with several different classes of railcars, but it was not until after the second World War that railcars began to replace provincial passenger services en masse.

Following the success of the Vulcan railcars introduced in the 1940s, NZR began investigating the replacement of the older Wairarapa class railcars in the mid-1940s with larger diesel-electric railcars. A tender for 25 replacement railcars was approved by Cabinet in 1944, but World War II delayed the completion of responses until 1947. In 1948, NZR decided not to proceed with this tender as the prices received were considered too high. In 1949, Cabinet approved a new tender to replace the Wairarapa railcars and other steam-hauled services, which were to have 88 seats and have braking equipment for the centre (Fell)rail on the Rimutaka Incline. A total of 35 railcars were now specified. It was decided that engines for the railcars should be mounted underfloor for increased passenger capacity and for a parcel and baggage compartment, with trussed chassis to support the braking equipment.

Tenders were received from English Electric and the Drewry Car Company. Drewry's tender presented a design for an articulated railcar with seating for 88 passengers, with either Hercules or Fiat 210 hp (160 kW) engines. An order was placed with Drewry in the United Kingdom in March 1950 for the railcars with the Fiat engines. Drewry had supplied some smaller diesel shunting locomotives (D^{SA} class and D^{SB} class locomotives) to NZR previously. A Ministerial letter of July 1955 to the Wellington Standard newspaper said regarding the Fiat engines that:

"...the make of engine was ordered because at the time it was the only "pancake" type of engine available outside the dollar area, and indeed the only one which had been designed for and proven in railcar use."

Due to the progress of the Rimutaka Tunnel (which opened in November 1955), and the impending closure of the Rimutaka Incline, it was decided by NZR to remove the requirement for centre-rail braking and the trussed chassis required to hold the braking equipment.

== Introduction ==
The railcars were constructed under subcontract by the Birmingham Railway Carriage and Wagon Company from Drewry. There were significant delays in delivering the railcars, with one (RM 120) damaged in transit, and used as a spare parts source for the other railcars. (Note: RM 120 was eventually put into service on 24 June 1958, after sufficient parts arrived to replace those removed from the railcar.) The first railcar was delivered in November 1954 and the last in May 1958.

They were to be cheaper than the 25 diesel-electric railcars that English Electric proposed in 1949 but had difficulty designing. They were to be built by the Drewry Car Company of Birmingham with lower-cost engines from Fiat. The Chief Mechanical Engineer Percy Roy Angus said railcar was a "first class engineering concern". Angus proposed to cancel the English Electric diesel-electric order, and to order 35 88-seater railcars instead. Ten of the railcars were to operate over the Rimutaka Incline. NZR General Manager Frank Aickin approved this order on 12 January 1950; and they were to be shipped to New Zealand from early 1952. With the opening of the Rimutaka Tunnel due to occur not long after the railcars arrived in New Zealand, the requirement for 10 railcars to be able to operate over the Rimutaka Incline was removed, so the railcars could all have lower floors and wider bodies. They were also to have reclining seats as required by the new General Manager Horace Lusty. The redesign spawned "multiple delays" and Drewry prioritised an order for Nyasaland (now Malawi). The first railcars finally arrived in early 1955.

The arrival of the first railcars was greeted with enthusiasm by local newspapers, and were described as a "new-dawn for long-distance rail travel" in New Zealand. A number of "ministerial special" promotional services were run in March 1955, and the first service operated by an 88-seater railcar was the Wellington-Gisborne daily service on 6 April 1955.

Following their introduction, the railcars suffered overheating from ballast dust and engine failure, which led to railcars running 20 to 30 minutes late every two to three days. This was despite two Fiat fitters being in New Zealand as the railcars went into service.

The railcars also suffered frequent internal fires, which led to external fires in the farmland and foliage along the tracks. Both types of fire were due to excessive hot carbon particles in the exhaust emissions. These problems were most notable in the South Island on steep West Coast railway lines and the steep Scargill and Dashwood sections of the Main North Line. The crankcases were not strong enough to absorb the power of the diesel engines that drove the railcars. These issues were considered so serious that NZR called a meeting with Drewry and Fiat in March 1957. Ten of the railcars had wrecked crankcases and blown motors. Following the meeting, a number of replacement motors and crankcases were ordered in late 1957.

Additional Fiat staff and fitters came to New Zealand from Italy and essentially rebuilt the engines and power systems of all the railcars. The rebuilding was completed in March 1959, and the Minister reported that the railcars were giving "much better service" as a result.

=== Second batch ===
The second batch of 15 railcars was authorised by the government in October 1955, but cancelled in 1956 due to the unsatisfactory performance of the first batch of railcars, in particular, their high cost in repairs and excessive diversion of skilled labour for those repairs, particularly in Auckland.

== In service ==
In early December 1955, NZR ran a four-day demonstration train from Picton to Invercargill, creating much public interest. After initial trials around Wellington, the railcars were deployed on a wide variety of provincial services. In the North Island they ran:

- Auckland – Okaihau and Opua (starting 12 November 1956);
- Auckland – Te Puke (starting 8 February 1959);
- Auckland – Rotorua (starting 8 February 1959);
- Auckland – Taumarunui and New Plymouth (starting 26 November 1956);
- Wellington – Napier and Gisborne (starting 1 August 1955)

In the South Island they ran:

- Christchurch – Picton (starting 12 February 1956);
- Christchurch – Invercargill (starting 13 February 1956);
- Christchurch – Greymouth and Ross in conjunction with the Vulcan class (starting 20 February 1956).

=== Operation ===
From almost the beginning the railcars faced mechanical problems, with cooling being the primary issue, along with crankcase failures and electrical fires towards the end of their lives. Although modifications were made they continued to have a reputation for unreliability throughout their career, frequently having to run with one motor isolated.

The 1950s was a period of increased prosperity and saw massive increases in the numbers of private motorcars, along with improvements to roads such as the tar sealing of main highways, and the construction of new roads such as the Auckland Harbour Bridge. Growing road traffic led to the requirement in 1956 that all railcars have headlights on at all times.

While the delay in introducing the railcars on the Rotorua route (1959) and the difficult geography of the Northland and Bay of Plenty service meant poor patronage, the railcars stabilised NZRs long-distance rail patronage at 3 million passengers annually from 1959 to 1964. But by the mid-1960s the railcars were dated, patronage fell and services became unprofitable.

=== Main trunk services ===
The 1952 Royal Commission recommended railcar services on the North Island Main Trunk and replacing the daylight Mail express trains on the South Island Main Trunk. NZR were opposed to the proposals of the Royal Commission and politicians PM Holland and Rail Minister McAlpine for daylight mainline railcar services and saw the existing Limited and Mail Express's timetable as excellent and the best possible in speed, convenience and safety. The 1952 160/175 Mail Express on the Main South Line leaving Dunedin at 8:45 am and Christchurch at 9:00 am on Monday, Wednesday and Friday which supplemented the 9 stop M, W, F Christchurch Invercargill, South Island Limited and the South Express which combined the Limited and Mail on Tu, Th, Sat and replace local trains between Auckland and Hamilton, Wellington and Palmerston North, Christchurch and Ashburton. These services did not eventuate following the decision to cancel the second batch of railcars in 1956.

=== Replacement engines ===
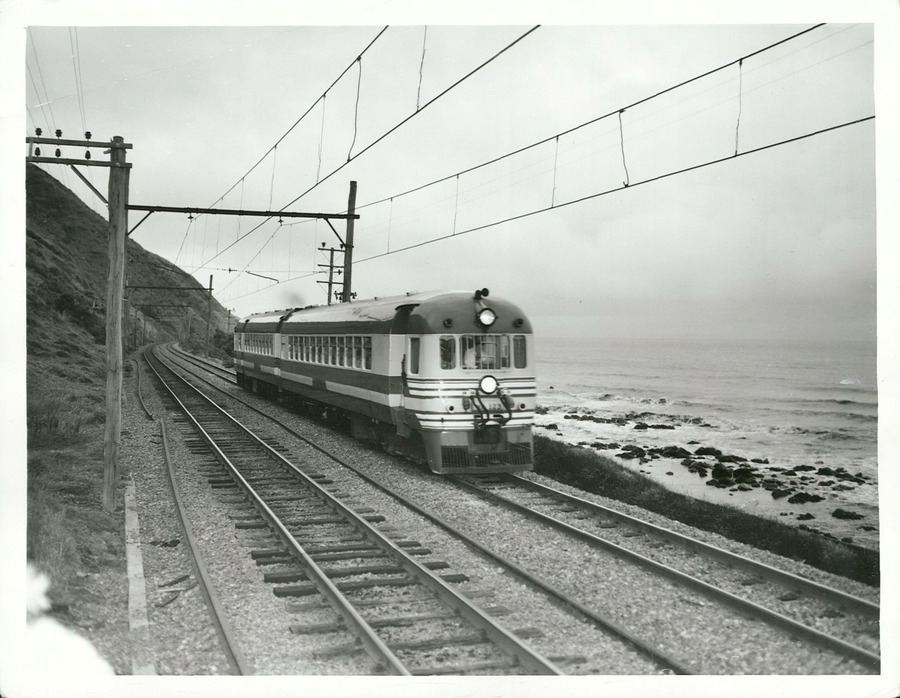
Northbound Blue Streak service approaching Paekākāriki

NZR requested the calling of tenders for new engines and crankshafts for all 35 railcars plus spares for £1.05 million New Zealand pounds in July 1966. In January 1967 the Cabinet approved only replacement crankshafts to continue the railcars for five years on the Wairarapa, Wellington-Napier-Gisborne and Auckland-New Plymouth routes and to conduct trials of fast upgraded railcar service between Auckland and Hamilton (later known as the "Blue Streak" service) and Wellington and Palmerston North. At the time it was intended to scrap all railcar services in the South Island, except for Vulcans on the Picton (Vulcan railcars and summer passenger trains replaced the 88-seaters on this route from 1967 to 1968) and West Coast services.

=== Service cancellations ===
From 31 July 1967 all railcar services between Auckland and Northland were cancelled, along with services from Auckland and Hamilton to Tauranga and Te Puke. The railcar service to New Plymouth was kept but was cut back to operate between New Plymouth and Taumarunui in 1971, with passengers making connections to North Island Main Trunk trains. This service lasted until 11 February 1978 when it was replaced by a carriage train. The final run of an 88-seater railcar was in 1978 from Greymouth to Christchurch. The last trip came to an ignominious end when an engine failure and fire meant that passengers had to be taken onwards from Otira by bus.

Almost all cancelled trains were replaced by New Zealand Railways Road Services buses.

=== Withdrawals ===
By 1971, 10 of the original 35 railcars had been withdrawn, due to engine problems or collisions with motor vehicles.

In 1976 it was announced that no more railcars would receive major overhaul works, and they would be withdrawn from service as they wore out. Although the remaining services were to areas not well served by road, the mechanical condition of the railcars meant that by the mid-1970s replacement was becoming urgent. By 1978, the only remaining railcars in NZR service were the Silver Ferns.

== Blue Streaks ==
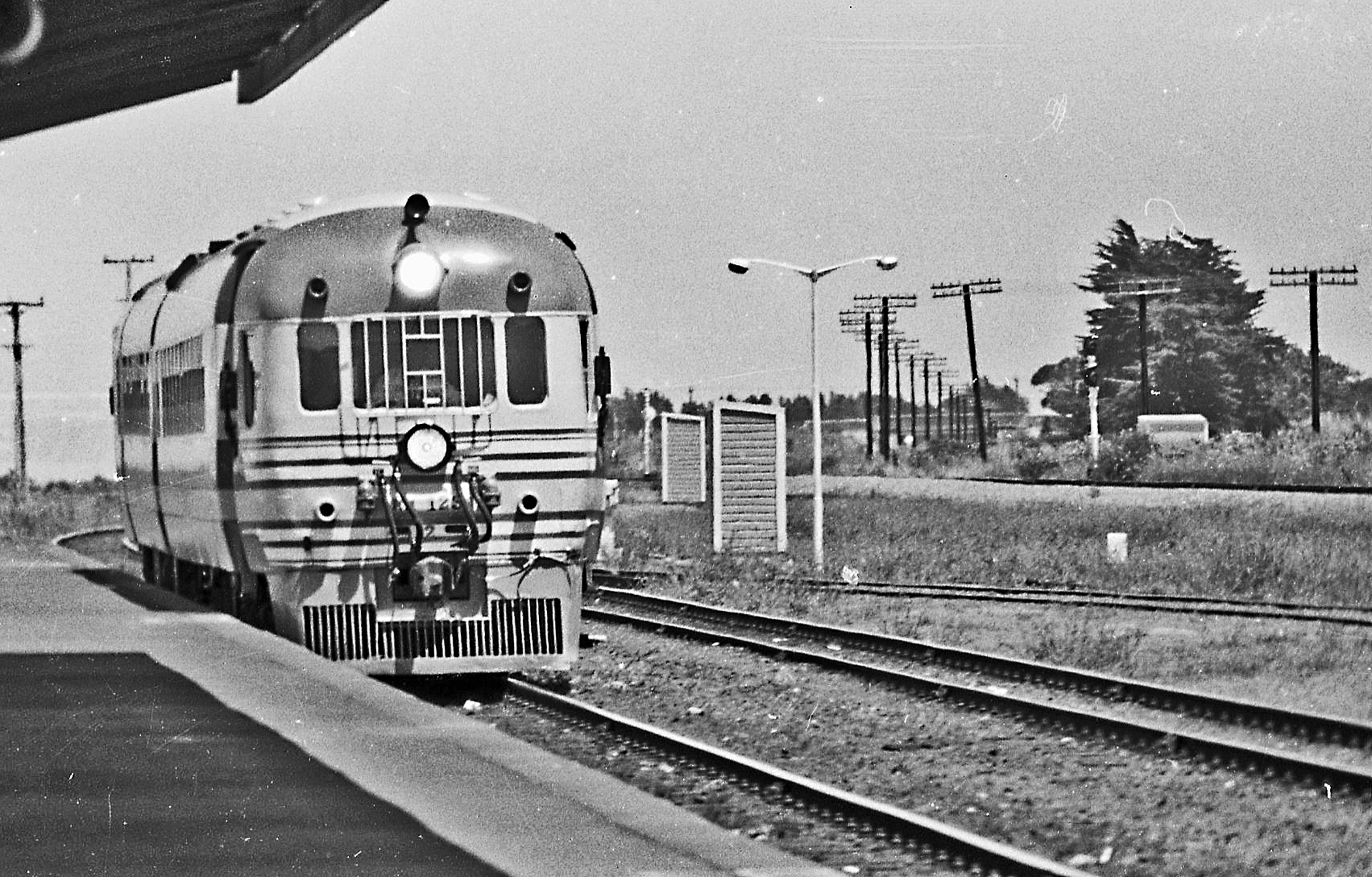
Blue Streak 88-seater RM 125 at Palmerston North railway station in 1974.

In 1968, at the suggestion of Hamilton City Council, an 88-seater was refurbished for a new fast service between Hamilton and Auckland aimed at business customers, which started on Monday, 8 April 1968. It was fitted with carpet and re-upholstered fabric-covered seats, and was painted in a new two-tone blue colour scheme that prompted the nickname Blue Streak. The seating was reduced to 84 to accommodate a servery area from which light meals and assorted alcoholic and non-alcoholic drinks could be purchased. This was notable as the first time that a regularly scheduled passenger train service in New Zealand had reinstated onboard catering since dining cars had been withdrawn across the network as an economy measure during World War I. This initial service was unsuccessful, with patronage well below the levels needed to be profitable. The service might have been successful if run the other way round from Hamilton to Auckland in the morning, but in 1968 the Wellington-Auckland Limited and Express were still timetabled to cater for the early morning commuter market from Hamilton and Huntly or in the other direction from Palmerston North and Levin and those leaving Auckland or Wellington in the evening for the Waikato or Manawatu or Horowhenua, while the NZR long term desire to maintain the New Plymouth- Auckland railcar service was much more because it brought people into Auckland in the morning, leaving Taumarunui at 6.30 am and Hamilton at 9.30 am and returned in the afternoon rather than for its night social and paper service through the King Country which Government saw as essential. Therefore, the Hamilton commuter market was served by many other services at lower second-class fare cost in 1968, and the Blue Streak experiment was simply in the wrong direction at the wrong time.

It was decided to introduce the railcar to a daytime service between Auckland and Wellington. This service, which started on Monday 23 September 1968, was highly successful and prompted the conversion of two further cars to 82 seats each to accommodate larger servery areas and, later, the purchase of the Silver Fern diesel-electric railcars for this service.

Initially, the Main Trunk Blue Streak railcar ran from Wellington to Auckland on Mondays, Wednesdays and Fridays and on Tuesdays and Thursdays from Auckland to Wellington until a second railcar was refurbished for the Christmas 1968 and New Year 1969 period and a third for the 1969 Easter holidays. The service proved so popular that it was not uncommon to see two of the railcars running in multiple.

On Thursday, 18 December 1972, the Blue Streak services were replaced by the new Silver Fern railcars and were transferred to the Wellington-to-New Plymouth service, replacing Standard railcars. They continued in this service until Friday, 30 July 1977. By that time, they were no longer serviceable, patronage had continued to decline, and the service was replaced with buses.

== Grassgrubs ==
In March 1976, NZR general manager Tom Small instructed his chief mechanical engineer to prepare plans to convert 14 railcars to unpowered carriages. In April 1976 the chief mechanical engineer reported that 23 railcars were suitable for conversion to locomotive-hauled passenger carriages. A formal white paper proposal was put to Treasury on 23 July 1976. The paper argued that conversion of the railcars to locomotive-hauled carriages was the most viable option given that most railcars were expected to have to be withdrawn by mid 1977 due to mechanical problems. The paper noted that as locomotive-hauled carriages, the railcars would not be able to maintain the same schedules, having to be slower when towed. While the paper recommended conversion, it also noted that the conversions were only a medium-term solution to maintain rail passenger services. Cabinet agreed to the proposal following Treasury advice to convert 14 railcars on 27 September 1976.

NZR's workshops began the conversions of the railcars. The workshops removed the railcars engines and drivers' cabs, added new lighting, seating, heaters, generators and new vinyl flooring. The carriages were classified as "AC". These carriages were refurbished painted a unique grass green (a Resene paint known as "Trendy Green.") with grey roofs and came to be known as "Grassgrubs" following an article in The Press describing the converted railcars as "The Grass-Grub Express" in an article on the trial run of the carriages on 1 December 1977.

Small's successor as general manager, Trevor Hayward, insisted on this scheme, as railway historian David Leitch put to Hayward in a letter that traditional Midland red was associated with poor service, arguing that if the public saw the carriages as just old red railcars hauled by locomotives, that would have negative connotations.

The first Grassgrub train ran on 5 December 1977 from Picton to Christchurch. The Napier-Gisborne Grassgrub service began on 20 March 1978, and proved popular. Between May and August average daily ridership was 61 per cent of capacity. The Grassgrubs were also used on the New Plymouth to Taumarunui, Wellington to Palmerston North via the Wairarapa and Christchurch to Greymouth services.

The Grassgrubs were ill-fated. Their drawgear and bodies were not designed to be locomotive-hauled and they quickly wore out. By 1985 they had all been withdrawn from service due to metal fatigue. The South Island based Grassgrubs were the first to be replaced by 56-foot carriages on the Picton-Christchurch and Christchurch-Greymouth services by 1983. The remaining Grassgrubs were moved to Wellington and remained in use on the Wellington-Gisborne, Wellington-Wairarapa services. The Gisborne service Grassgrubs were withdrawn by 1984, along with the Wellington-Wairarapa services in June 1985.

Most of the passenger runs were continued after their demise, but the New Plymouth-Taumarunui service ended on 23 January 1983 (having already had its rolling stock replaced by 56-foot carriages.) The Wellington to Gisborne service eventually terminated at Napier following Cyclone Bola in March 1988. By July 1988, the Wellington-Wairarapa service was abbreviated to terminate in Masterton as patronage on the Masterton – Palmerston North section was often fewer than 20 passengers per trip, due to improved highways and bus services.

The Grassgrubs were sent to Douglas, Taranaki for scrapping, after their useful parts were stripped out of them at Easttown Workshops. One set was sold to the Ministry of Transport for fire service training at Auckland International Airport and has been preserved (see below).

== Preservation ==
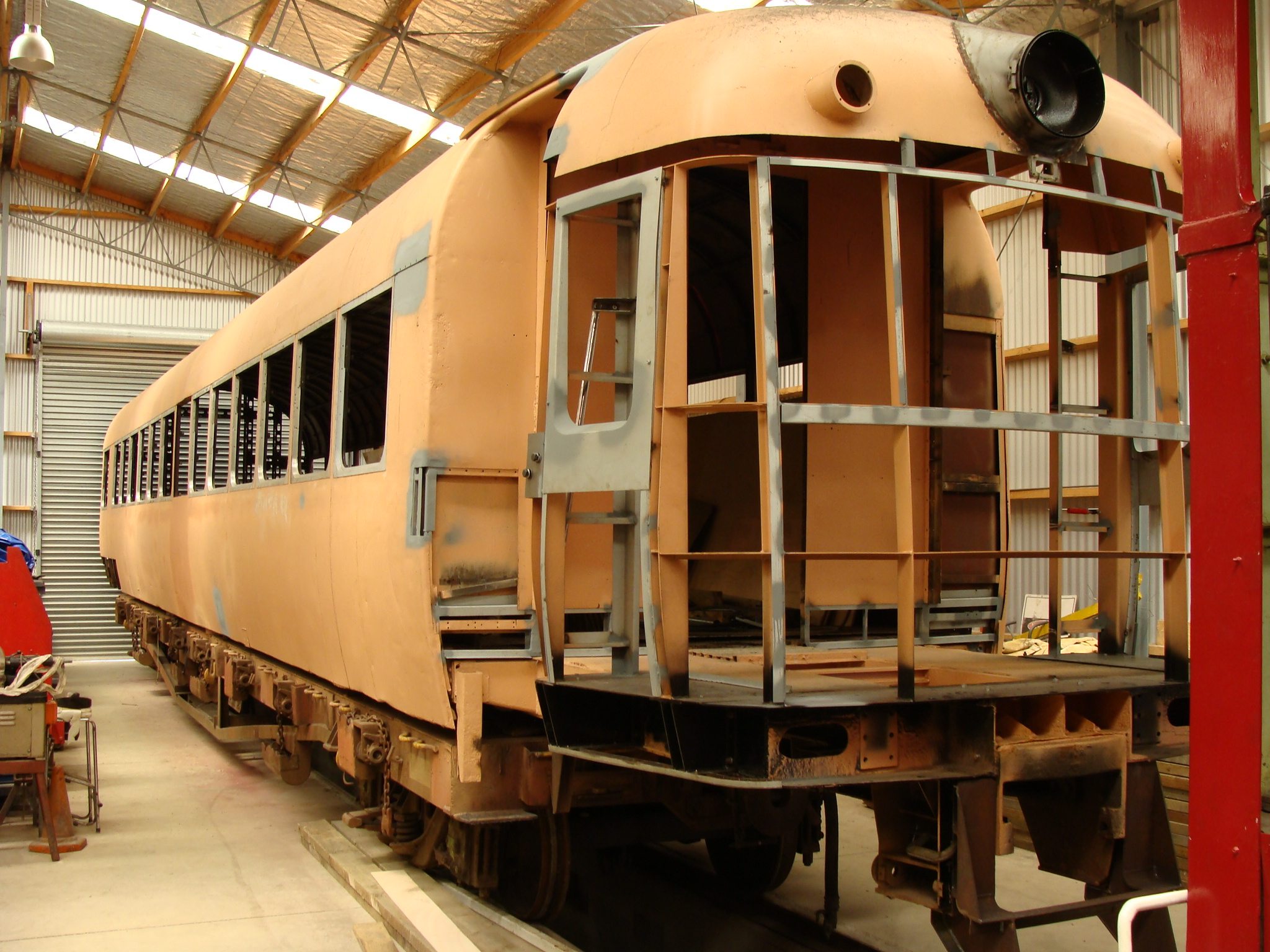
One half of RM 121 in the Railcar Storage Shed at Pahiatua Railway Station.

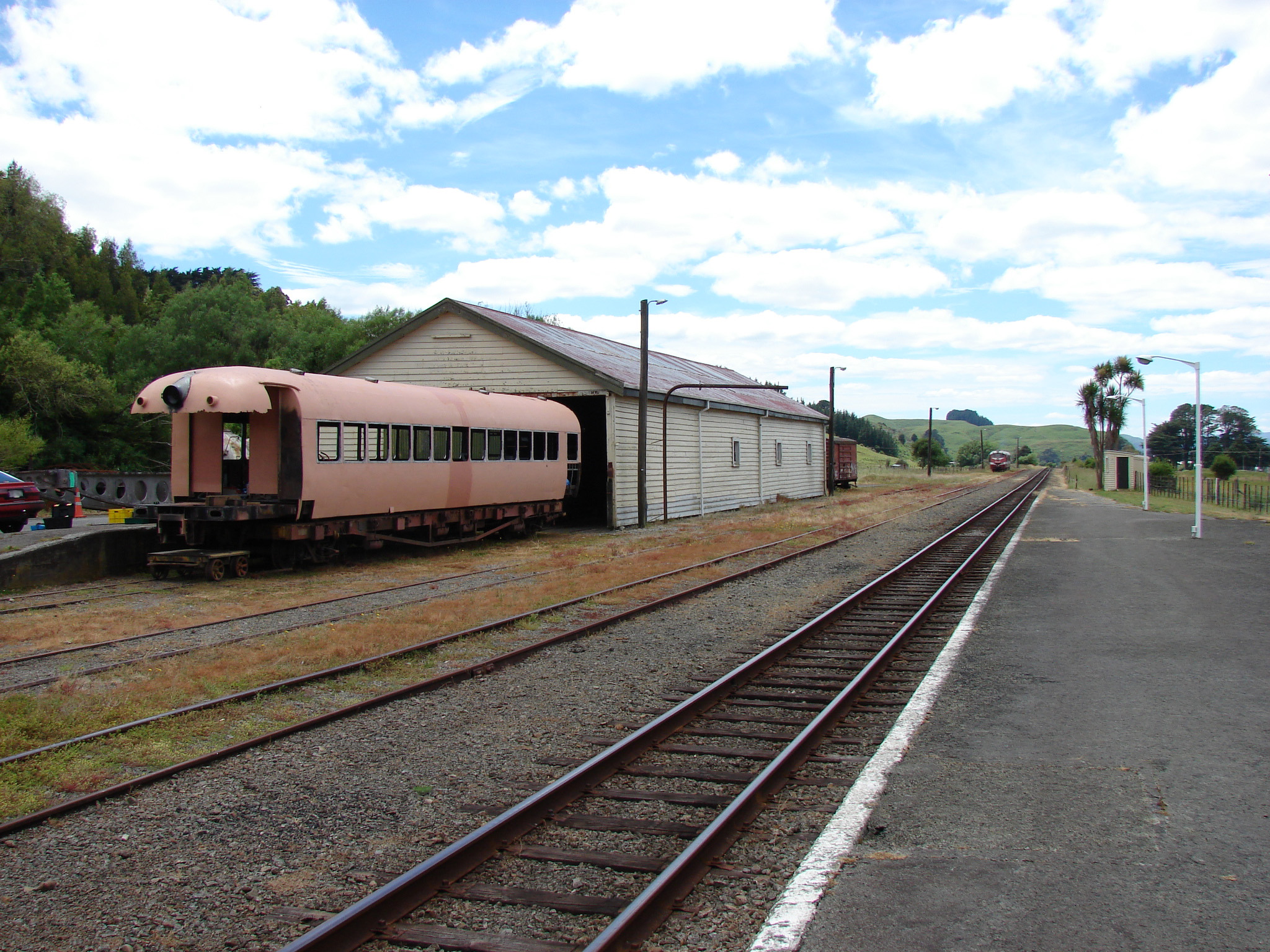
RM 121 being restored by the RM 133 Trust Board.

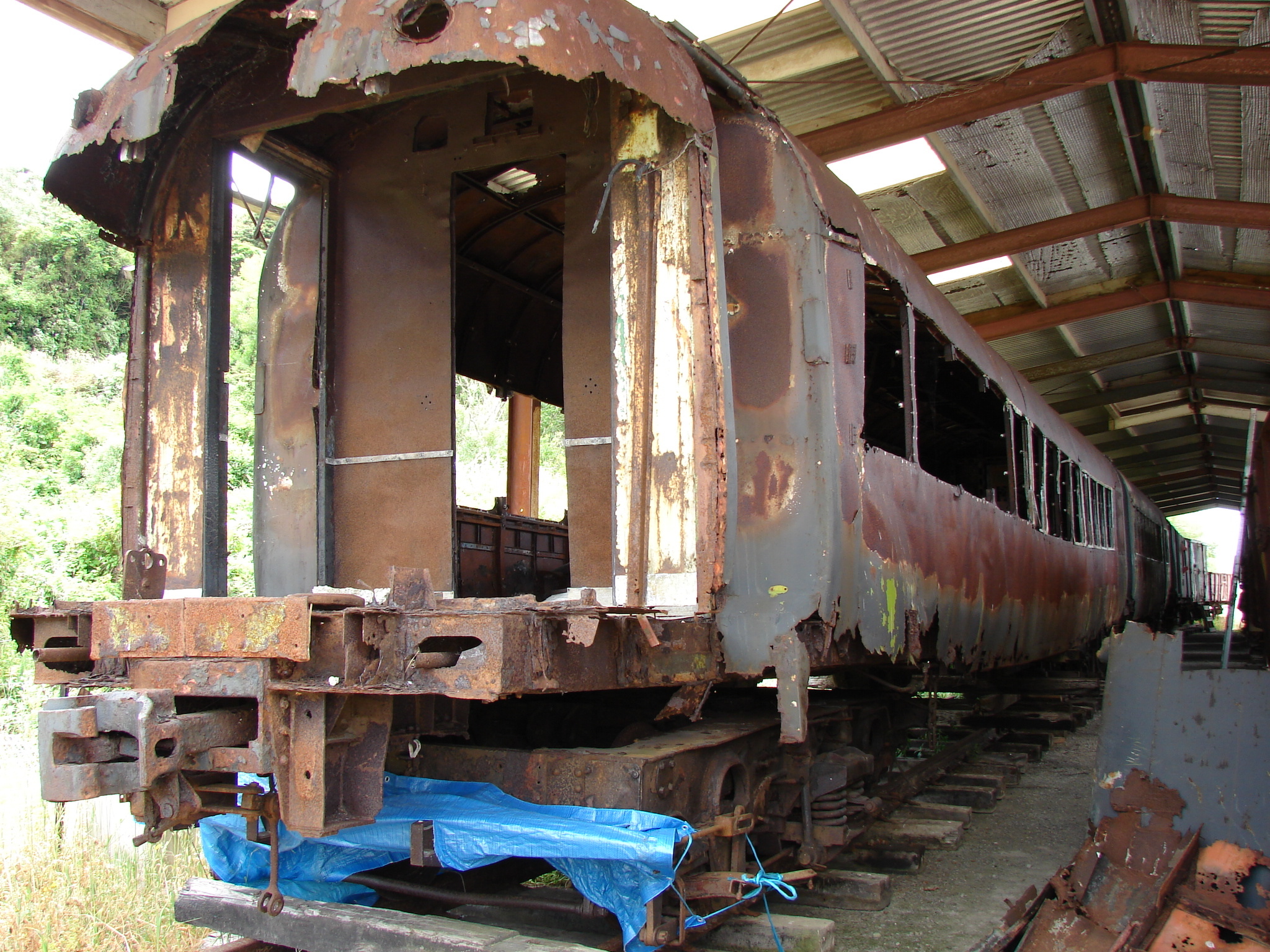
Damaged NZR RM 133 88-seater modules at Pahiatua for the RM 133 Trust.

Following withdrawal from service, a number of the 88 seaters were stored around the country. Several units along with a Vulcan railcar were sold to the Southern Rail preservation project at Christchurch where they were later scrapped; the cab and baggage car section of the No.1 end of RM 119 on the leading bogie together with some engines and gearboxes were kept at this time. After the project was wound up, the partial section of RM 119 was moved to Linwood Locomotive Depot where it remained in storage for several years. Subsequently, the further abbreviated RM 119 consisting of just the cab and part of the baggage compartment was stored in a Bromley scrapyard, where it was found and purchased by the RM 133 Trust Board.

By the early 1990s, the only known survivor was RM 133 in its "Grassgrub" form as AC 8140, used for fire training at Auckland Airport. In 2001 the RM 133 Trust Board was able to obtain this car. Before the railcar could be removed a fire broke out in the No 2 end of the railcar, damaging the body. The RM 133 Trust decided to look for any other extant railcar halves to pair with the No 1 end of RM 133, which had been moved to the Pahiatua Railcar Society's site.

The No 1 end of RM 121 was discovered at a holiday camp in Waitomo in 2001 - 2002. The ends had been separated in the mid-1980s after the railcar was used as offices at a former theme park in East Tamaki, Auckland, and the No 1 end had then gone to Kaukapakapa until 1996 when it went to Waitomo.

On New Year's Eve 2002, the trust located the No 2 end of RM 121 in a quarry at Kerikeri, where it had been since the ends were separated. Its move to Kerikeri was reported in railway publications at the time, but it fell off the radar after that. Although the car was in a weathered condition and had been cut in half at some point, it was still relatively complete despite missing the seats, bogies (removed in the late 1970s at Otahuhu Workshops), and its diesel engines. This railcar was purchased to become the replacement for the damaged half of RM 133 and moved to Pahiatua where restoration work began.

The Trust negotiated with the owners of the No 1 end of RM 121 to buy it and were eventually able to do so in 2011 in exchange for two former wooden passenger cars. It was then trucked to Pahiatua to be reunited with the No 2 end there.

The two ends of RM 121 are now being restored at Pahiatua; the two halves of the No 2 end have been welded together again and a new cab structure and cowcatcher built. The No 1 end has been stripped of any fittings from its time spent at Waitomo and various reconstruction work is taking place. The resultant car will utilise the bogies from RM 133.

The two ends of RM 133 are in storage at Pahiatua.
