= Red Scare (disambiguation) =

A "Red Scare" is the promotion of a widespread fear of a potential rise of communism or anarchism by a society or state.

Red Scare may also refer to:

- Red Scare (podcast), a cultural commentary podcast
- Red Scare Industries, a punk rock record label
- Red Scare (comics), a character in the comic book series The Tick

== See also ==
- First Red Scare, in the US, around WWI
- McCarthyism or Second Red Scare, in post-WWII US
- Red Terror (disambiguation)
