= Red Terror (disambiguation) =

The Red Terror was a campaign of mass arrests and executions conducted by the Bolshevik government of Soviet Russia in 1918–1922.

Red Terror may also refer to:

- Red Terror (Hungary), atrocities by the Hungarian Communist Party and its supporters in 1919
- Red Terror (Spain), atrocities by Spanish Republicans during the Spanish Civil War from 1936 to 1939
- Leftist errors, sometimes called the Red Terror, campaign of violence by communist partisans in Yugoslavia (1941–1942) during World War II
- Red Terror (Greece), from approximately 1942 or 1943 until the end of the Greek Civil War in 1949
- Red Terror (Ethiopia), a violent political campaign by the Derg against the Ethiopian People's Revolutionary Party from 1977 to 1978

== Other uses ==
- The Red Terror (film), the English title for GPU, a 1942 German film directed by Karl Ritter
- NZR RM class (Red Terror), a NZR railcar used by a former general manager Garnet Mackley
- "Red Terror", a 2025 song by The Weeknd
- Red Terror or Phar Lap, a champion race horse
- The Red Terror, a figure in the Warhammer 40,000 video game
- The mascot of the sports teams at Glynn Academy High School in Brunswick, Georgia
