= Garnet Mackley =

New Zealand politician (1883–1986)

Garnet Mackley CMG
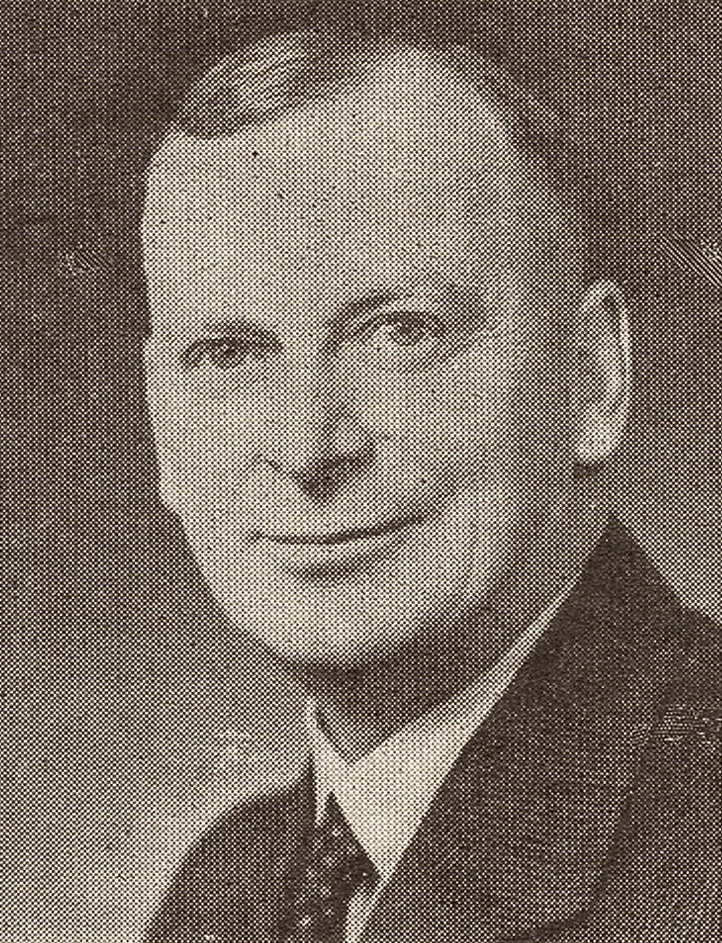
- Born: Garnet Hercules Mackley; 9 December 1883; Port Chalmers, New Zealand
- Died: 24 April 1986 (aged 102)
- Occupations: Businessman, railways manager, politician

Garnet Hercules Mackley CMG (9 December 1883 – 24 April 1986) was a New Zealand businessman, railways manager and politician.

== Career ==
Mackley was born in Port Chalmers. He became general manager of New Zealand Railways in 1933. During his tenure, Mackley worked hard to improve the standard and range of services provided by the railways. He won approval for the construction of an inspection car known as the "Red Terror" in which he travelled the entire system inspecting stations and meeting staff. The car's success encouraged him to order the construction of railcars that were to serve the railways for many years, specifically the Midland, Wairarapa, Standard, and Vulcan classes.

He also wanted to improve the comfort of passengers and initiated a local building programme which provided the basis of passenger carriage stock for many years.

In the 1938 New Year Honours, Mackley was appointed a Companion of the Order of St Michael and St George. In 1940 he retired, and was made managing director of the Whakatane Paper Mills.

== Member of Parliament ==
New Zealand Parliament
Years	Term	Electorate	Party
1943–1946	27th	Masterton	National
1946–1949	28th	Wairarapa	National

Mackley then entered politics, becoming a Member of Parliament for the New Zealand National Party. He was elected as the MP for Masterton (1943–1946) and then for Wairarapa (1946–1949), after which he retired.

In 1950 he was appointed to the Legislative Council by National, as a member of the so-called suicide squad charged with voting for the abolition of the Council (or Upper House).

== Notes ==
New Zealand Parliament
Preceded by Ben Roberts	Member of Parliament for Wairarapa; 1946–1949	Succeeded by Bert Cooksley
Preceded by John Robertson	Member of Parliament for Masterton; 1943–1946	Seat abolished
