= NZR A 88 Buckhurst petrol carriage =

NZR A 88 was a railway passenger carriage converted into the Buckhurst petrol carriage railcar in 1924. It was the only railcar operated by NZR not designated as a member of the NZR RM class; while a railcar, it retained the designation of A 88. This designation was wholly unrelated to the steam locomotive A class of 1873 or A class of 1906.

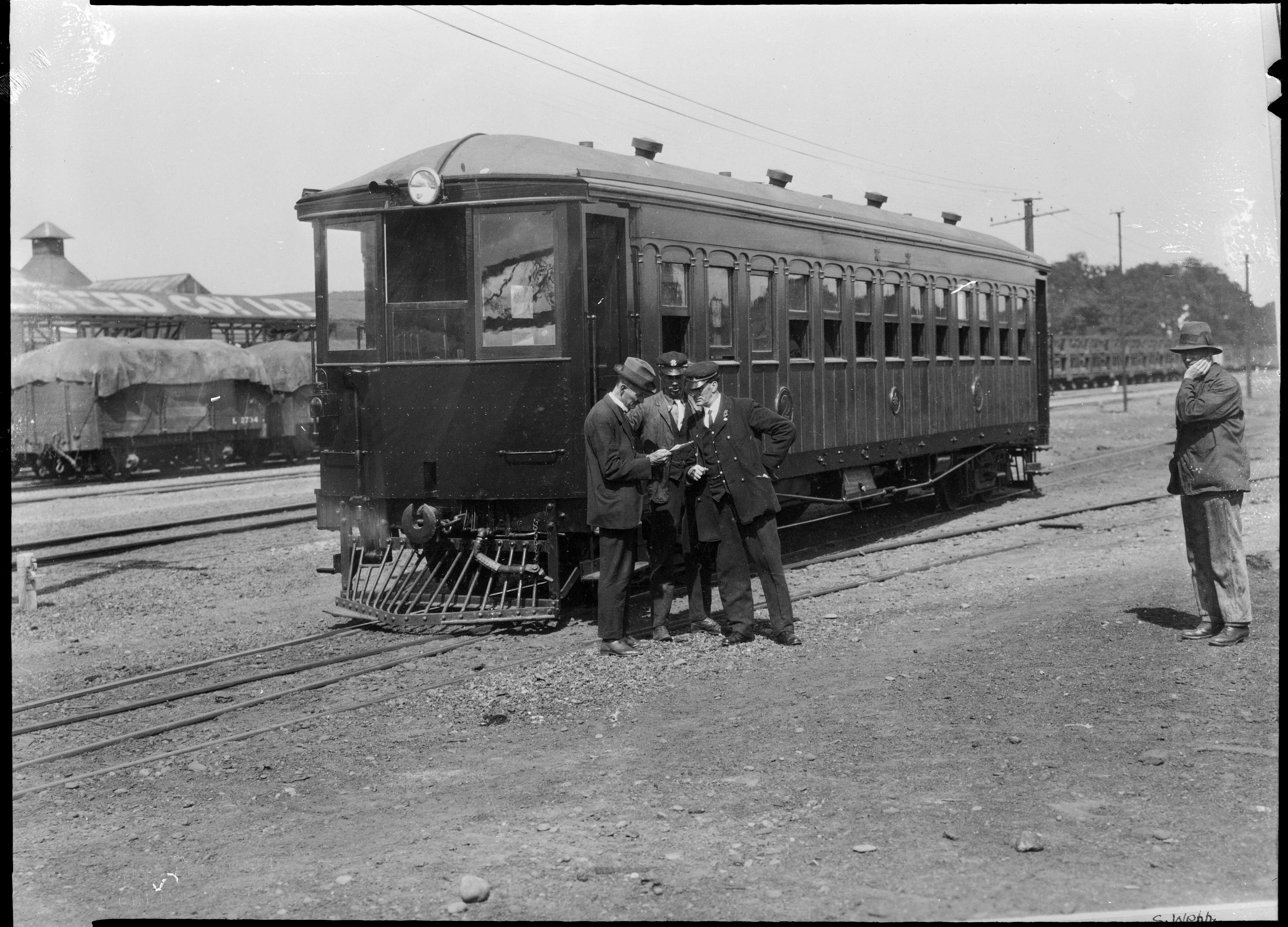
NZR A 88 railcar in 1925

== History ==
In the 1910s, NZR began experimenting with railcar technology to cater for passengers on routes that could not economically support locomotive-hauled dedicated passenger trains and thus had to settle for undesirably slow mixed trains (freight trains with passenger carriages attached). World War I and its subsequent economic impacts brought research to a halt after three unsuccessful experiments. In 1924, work resumed at Christchurch's Addington Workshops after a local engineer, E. B. Buckhurst, was given approval to convert a regular passenger carriage into a railcar. A 88 was the carriage chosen for the task; it had been imported from the United States in 1878 and prior to its renovation, it provided seated accommodation for second class passengers.

== Technical details ==
A 88 was fitted with a unique gearbox designed by Buckhurst. Power was provided by a Hudson six cylinder petrol engine typically used by cars that was slung laterally beneath the 13-metre (42 ft 8 in) long, 13.5-tonne (13.3-long-ton; 14.9-short-ton) carriage. Compartments for the driver were installed at each end of the carriage, giving it a passing resemblance to trams of the era. A total of 48 passengers could be carried by an A 88 in its railcar guise.

== Trials ==
The first test run of the railcar was to Sandy Knolls, 27 kilometres (17 mi) from Addington, and subsequent trials meant the railcar covered a distance of more than 3,000 km (1,900 mi). The railcar successfully operated at a speed of 55 km/h (34 mph), with its top attained speed approximately 65 km/h (40 mph), but problems and faults became manifest over the trial period. The most notable problem was that the engine tended to overheat, and this combined with other flaws meant that the project became uneconomic and was abandoned before A 88 entered regular passenger service. The railcar parts were removed and sold and A 88 was returned to regular locomotive-hauled service in passenger trains after being re-converted into an un-motorised carriage.
