= Percy Angus =

New Zealand railway engineer and administrator

Percy Roy Angus (22 September 1893 – 7 July 1961) was a New Zealand railway mechanical engineer, locomotive designer and administrator. He was born in Wellington, New Zealand on 22 September 1893, and died in Lower Hutt on 27 July 1961.

He served in the New Zealand Army Engineers in World War I.

He was responsible for the design of rolling stock in the 1930s and 1940s; the NZR K class and the NZR j class locomotives and the NZR Standard (Aotea) class railcars. The very successful K, Ka and Kb class locomotives superseded the unsuccessful NZR G class.

He joined the New Zealand Government Railways as a mechanical engineering cadet in Invercargill in 1910, and worked in Addington and Wellington.

He became assistant chief mechanical engineer in Wellington in 1926, and NZR Chief Mechanical Engineer in 1941, responsible for the Railway workshops and locomotive running branches. He retired in June 1950.

He was President of the New Zealand Institution of Engineers in 1952-1953.
