= NZR RM class (Westinghouse) =

The NZR RM class Westinghouse railcar was an experimental railcar built by the New Zealand Railways Department (NZR) in 1914. Although not the first railcar to operate in New Zealand, it was the first to enter revenue service.

== Development ==
In the early 20th century, NZR sought a means of providing economic services on lines with low traffic, including some suburban routes and to provide a faster alternative to mixed trains on rural lines. It aimed to develop a light self-powered vehicle that could operate economically even with low passenger levels. The MacEwan Pratt petrol railcar of 1912 did not pass its tests and never entered revenue service. It was dismantled in May 1913; the next experiment with railcar technology did not take place until 1914, when the Westinghouse railcar was developed. It re-used the classification of RM 1 that had been given to the MacEwan-Pratt railcar.

== Technical specifications ==
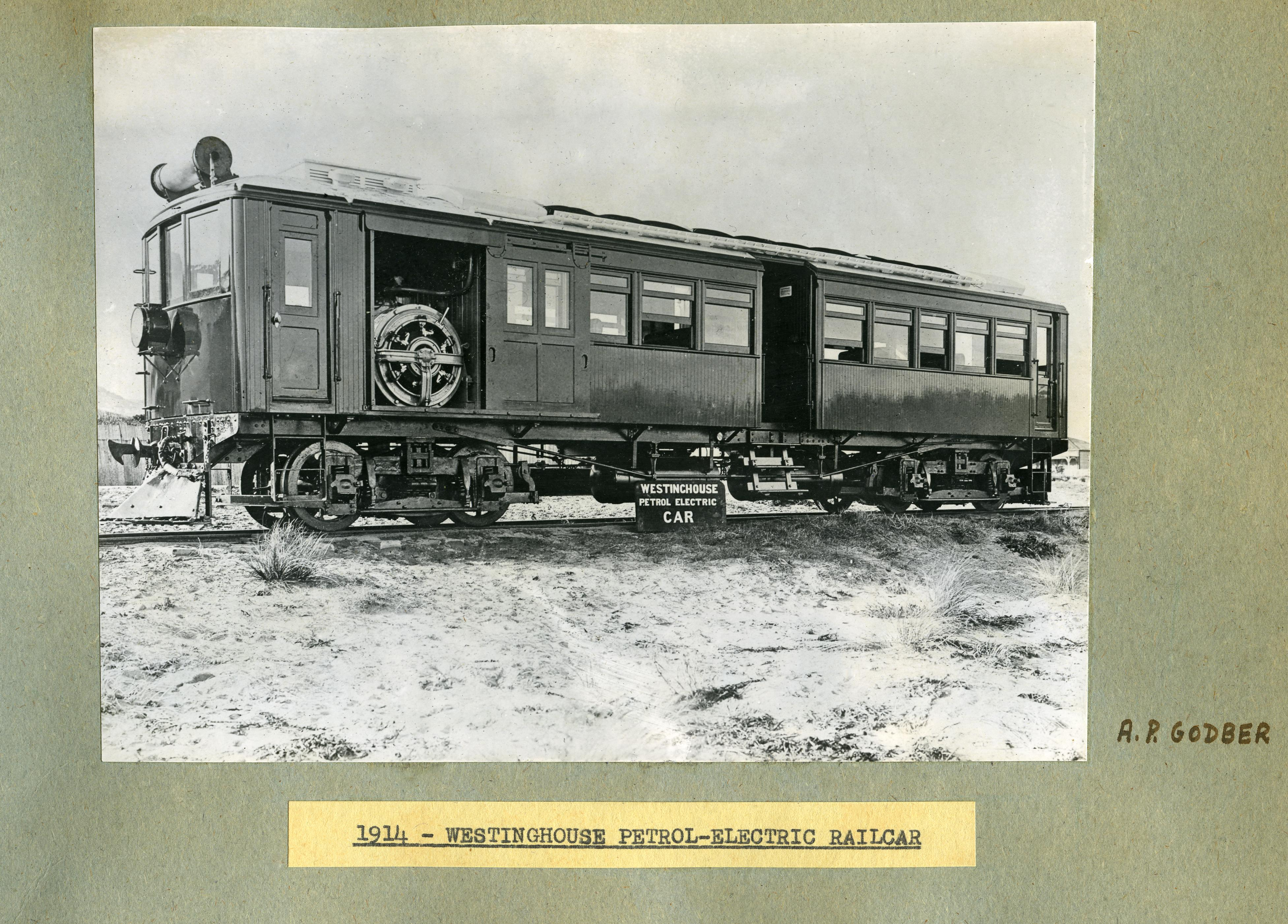

RM 1 was the solitary example of its type. The traction equipment, underframe, and bogies were provided by British Westinghouse and were fitted to a wooden body that had been built by NZR at the Petone Workshops. The wooden body largely resembled a railway passenger carriage, though the driving compartments fitted at each end had an appearance similar to contemporary trams. The six-cylinder petrol engine and 67 kW (90 hp) generator were housed in a compartment at one end of the railcar, and the current produced was fed to two 45 kW (60 hp) electric traction motors, one fitted to each bogie. This allowed the 14.17-metre (46.5 ft) long, 18-tonne (18-long-ton; 20-short-ton) railcar to travel at speeds up to 56 km/h (35 mph), although a contemporary account claimed 40 mph. In its gas-illuminated passenger compartment, it had provisions for 48 passengers.

== Operation ==
The railcar was placed in service on the steep Wellington - Johnsonville section of what was then the North Island Main Trunk Railway and now known as the Johnsonville Branch. NZR intended that it also haul a passenger carriage, to boost its capacity further. However, on steep grades, the railcar was wholly incapable of hauling a carriage: not even small carriages such as those of the nine-metre (29.5 ft) long B class variety were within its capabilities. Even without a carriage attached, the railcar continued to face frequent breakdowns and other difficulties. In 1916 it was joined by another experimental vehicle, the Thomas Transmission railcar, and in 1917 it was withdrawn from service. It lay derelict at the back of the Wellington car yard at the Thorndon station that preceded the present Wellington railway station and was eventually destroyed.
