= NZR RM class (Midland) =

Railcar

NZR RM class Midland
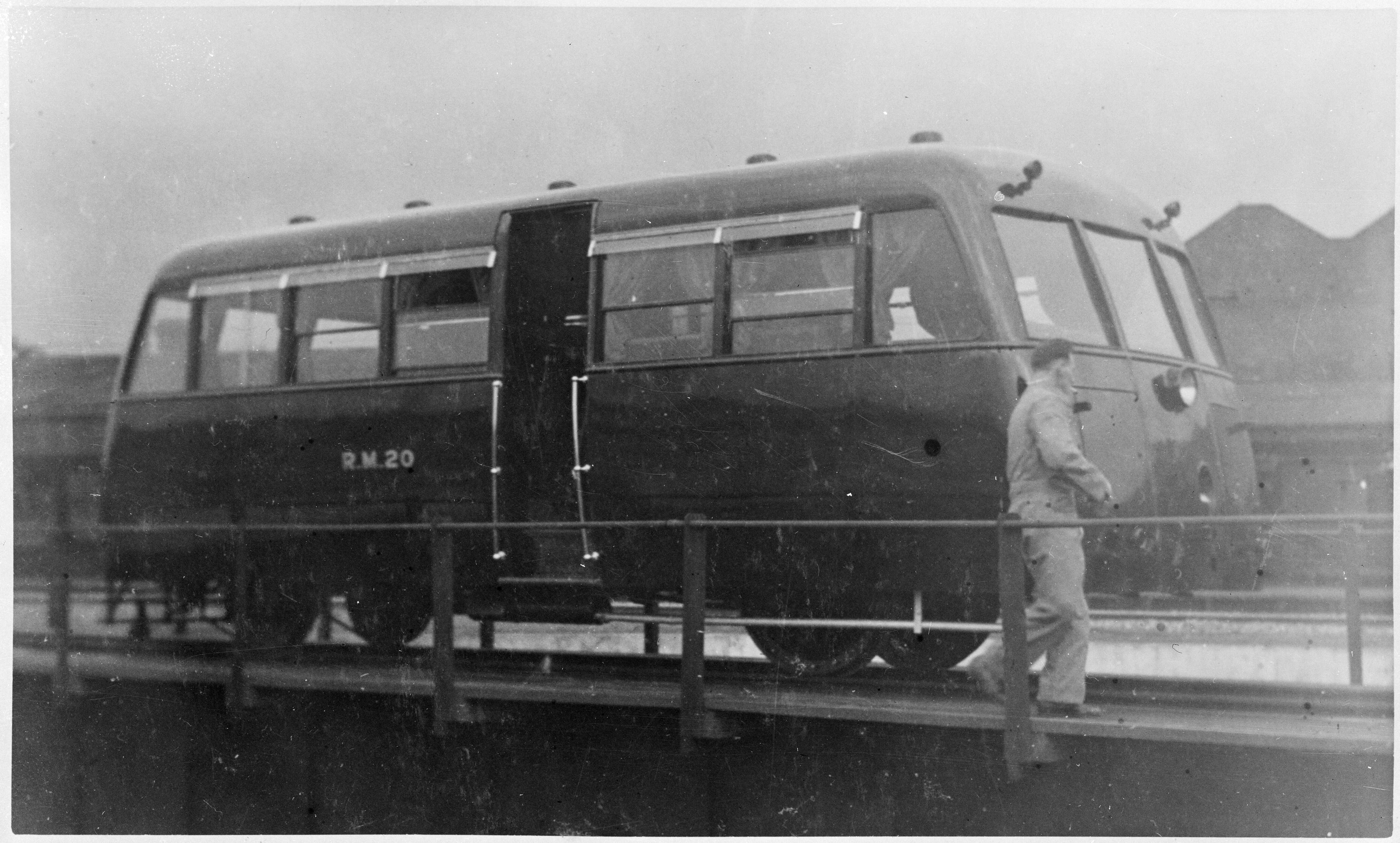
- RM 20 in 1936
- In service: 1936–1941
- Manufacturer: New Zealand Railways
- Built at: Hutt Workshops
- Constructed: 1936
- Entered service: 3 August 1936
- Scrapped: 1942
- Number built: 2
- Number in service: None
- Number preserved: None
- Fleet numbers: RM 20 and RM 21
- Capacity: 19 passengers; or 8 passengers and 1 ton newspapers
- Operator: New Zealand Railways
- Lines served: Midland Line, Hokitika Branch, Stillwater–Westport Line

Specifications
- Car length: 26 ft 1 in (7.95 m) overall
- Width: 8 ft 9.5 in (2.68 m)
- Maximum speed: 60 mph (97 km/h)
- Weight: 7.81 long tons (7.94 tonnes; 8.75 short tons)
- Prime movers: Leyland 8.6 litre (525 cu); 6-cylinder diesel engine
- Power output: 98 hp (73 kW)
- Transmission: Lysholm-Smith Fluid Torque Converter
- UIC classification: 1-A
- Track gauge: 3 ft 6 in (1,067 mm)

The NZR RM class Midland railcar (or Leyland diesel railcar) was the first successful railcar, and first diesel-powered vehicle, to enter revenue service in New Zealand. Two were built, RM 20 and RM 21, and they ran for five years from 1936 to 1941 before being replaced by larger Vulcan railcars. They operated primarily on the Midland Line and the Greymouth-Hokitika portion of the Ross Branch

These kinds of vehicles were known in some other countries by a variety of other names, including "railbuses" and "railmotors". However, such self-propelled passenger vehicles were known in New Zealand as "railcars" from the late-1920s onwards.

== Background ==
The New Zealand Railways Department (NZR) had been looking for an economic means of handling regional and rural passenger traffic for over two decades. Branch lines in rural New Zealand were typically operated by mixed trains that carried both passengers and goods, and their schedules were usually slow due to the loading and unloading of freight that occurred during the journey. This slowness made them unpopular with travellers, but insufficient demand existed to justify a dedicated passenger service. Secondary main lines in regional districts often had their own passenger trains, but these were often uneconomic, especially as car ownership and bus competition rose in the 1920s and 1930s. Thus, NZR investigated railcars as an alternate means of providing an attractive passenger service without the expenditure and costs associated with a locomotive-hauled carriage train.

The first experiment with railcars took place in 1912 with a MacEwan-Pratt petrol railcar, and while it was not a success, further research and development was undertaken in the following years. By 1936, no design had proven successful enough to warrant construction of a whole class, though an Edison battery-electric railcar built in 1926 had proved efficient and popular until it was destroyed by fire in 1934.

In 1936, NZR and a newspaper company were looking into the development of a railcar to provide quick conveyance of both passengers and Christchurch Press newspapers from Christchurch to Westland: although long-term prospects for large railcars existed, a more immediate solution was required. For this experiment, NZR utilised a diesel-engined Leyland bus chassis to create a small railbus. Two were built at Hutt Workshops in Petone and entered revenue service in the South Island.

== Technical specifications ==
The Midland railcar used the chassis of a Leyland Tiger bus, though once its body was constructed it did not look like a bus. It had four wheels, was 7.9 metres (26 ft) long, and weighed 7.9 tonnes (7.8 long tons; 8.7 short tons) unladen. Power was provided by a Leyland 8.6-litre (520 cu in) diesel engine that could produce up to 73 kW (98 hp) at 1,950 rpm and propel the railbus at speeds of up to 97 km/h (60 mph). Electric lighting and thermostatically controlled hot air radiators were both fitted. Up to 19 passengers could be carried, though with a full load of 1.0 tonne (1.0 long ton; 1.1 short tons) of newspapers this was reduced to 8 passengers.

Initially, the two railcars had one technical difference: RM 20 was built with a four-speed manual gearbox, while RM 21 utilised a fluid torque converter. Three months after services began, RM 20 was also fitted with a fluid torque converter.

== Trials ==
A 320 km (200-mile) trial run of RM 20 was undertaken in the Wellington area on Saturday 25 July 1936 and included a climb up to Pukerua Bay on the 1 in 57 grade. Its performance was considered "exceptionally good" and the car "flew like a bird" up the steepest grades. The all-round view that passengers had of the surrounding countryside from the front half of the railcar was favourably commented on by passengers, as was the very quiet running of the engine.

The first of the two railcars, RM 20, was taken from Wellington to Lyttelton on the deck of the steamer Waipiata on 29 July 1936.

The first trial run of RM 20 in the South Island was on 30 July 1936 from Christchurch to Hokitika and return – a distance of 547 km (340 miles) in 9 hours 26 minutes running time (an average speed of 58 km/h (36 mph)), despite the motor not having been run in. Another trial run from Christchurch to Timaru on 31 July 1936 demonstrated that the railcars could cover a distance of 164 km (102 miles) in 2 hours 8 minutes at an average speed of 77 km/h (48 mph). The speed of the vehicle surpassed the expectations of all Railways Department experts, according to the general manager, Garnet Mackley.

RM 20 entered service on Wednesday 5 August 1936, two days later than earlier announcements but less than two weeks after its first trial run.

The second Midland railcar, RM 21, arrived in the South Island in October 1936. It made a fast trial run on Friday 16 October from Christchurch to Greymouth and back, the trip to Greymouth being driven by the general manager, Mr Mackley, himself.

RM 21 entered service on Monday 19 October 1936, and RM 20 was then given an overhaul, having completed 35,000 km (22,000 miles).

== In service ==
Their regular services were subsidised by the Christchurch morning newspaper The Press and the first service of the day was timetabled to allow early delivery of the morning edition of the paper. The first timetable came into effect on 3 August 1936 with a 2:20 am departure from Christchurch, arriving in Greymouth at 6:40 am and Hokitika at 7:55 am, soon changed to 7:45 am. Two local return services were operated from Hokitika: a morning trip to Reefton (cut back to Greymouth by August 1938) and an afternoon trip to Greymouth. The return service left Hokitika at 4:25 pm, called at Greymouth at 5:42 pm, and reached Christchurch at 10:23 pm.

The service between Greymouth and Christchurch was almost two and a half hours quicker than the steam-hauled West Coast Express passenger trains of the time. The railcars initially covered 526 miles (847 km) a day, reducing to 434 miles (698 km) when the Reefton service was cut back to Greymouth.

=== Incidents ===
Early in the morning on Monday 30 November 1936, a railcar that had departed Christchurch at 2:30 am collided with a stag on the Midland line. Two windows were broken on the railcar and the stag was killed. The car was delayed 38 minutes, but continued, and the time had been made up by the end of the journey.

While operating the afternoon Hokitika to Greymouth service on 18 January 1937, a Midland railcar was involved in a fatal accident when it jumped off the rails at a level crossing near Arahura. Aboard were 19 passengers and 3 railway employees; William Jeffries, a Hokitika auctioneer, was killed, and twelve others were injured. The derailment was caused by loose stones on the track that were scattered by a herd of cattle that had recently crossed the line; the front wheels left the rails while the rear ones did not, and the railcar in this condition travelled for 2.5 chains (50 m) as the driver unsuccessfully sought to stabilise and stop it. After this point, the rear wheels also left the rails as the front wheels dropped over the side of an embankment, and three chains (60 m) from the level crossing, the railcar had spun so that it faced in the direction opposite to that which it was travelling. The top of the railcar separated from the bottom, with the bottom half coming to rest fifteen feet (4.6 m) from the line down the side of the embankment while one end of the top half lay on the line. The railcar was subsequently repaired and returned to service.

== Replacement ==
In 1940, the first Vulcan railcar was introduced into service. It took over the Monday, Wednesday, and Friday trips from the Midland railcars on 28 October 1940, the Midlands continuing to operate on other days. In 1941 more Vulcans arrived, replacing the Midlands altogether, and in 1942 the Midlands were dismantled at the Addington Workshops in Christchurch.

The Wairarapa railcars that entered service five weeks after the Midlands were similar, in that they were also based on the principle of a bus, but were much larger, accommodating 49 passengers, and were designed specifically to operate over the steep Rimutaka Incline. They ran until the closure of the incline in 1955.
