= NZR RM class (Vulcan) =

NZR RM class Vulcan
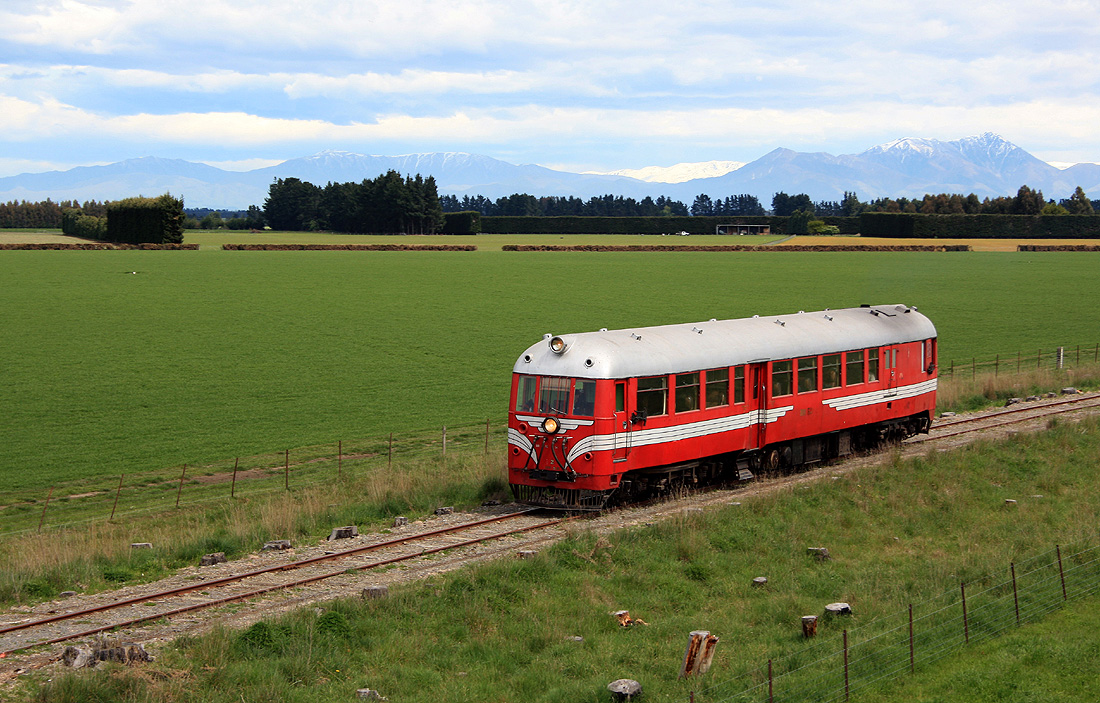
- The Plains Railway Vulcan RM 50.
- In service: 1940–1978
- Manufacturer: Vulcan Foundry
- Constructed: 1938–1942
- Entered service: 28 October 1940 – 1942
- Number built: 10 (9 entered service; 1 lost at sea)
- Number in service: None
- Number preserved: 4
- Number scrapped: 5 (1972–1978)
- Fleet numbers: RM 50–RM 58
- Capacity: 50 passengers
- Operator: New Zealand Government Railways
- Lines served: Midland Line, Hokitika Branch, Stillwater–Westport Line, Otago Central Line, Main South Line, Main North Line

Specifications
- Car length: 66 ft 3 in (20.19 m)
- Width: 8 ft 8 in (2.64 m)
- Height: 11 ft 6 in (3.51 m)
- Maximum speed: 75 mph (121 km/h)
- Weight: Ready for service: 36 long tons (37 tonnes or 40 short tons)
- Prime mover: Vulcan-Frichs 6-cylinder diesel engine
- Power output: 250 hp (190 kW)
- Transmission: Vulcan-Sinclair fluid coupling & 5-speed Wilson epicyclic gearbox
- UIC classification: A1A-2
- Bogies: Two
- Multiple working: Yes
- Track gauge: 3 ft 6 in (1,067 mm)

The NZR RM class Vulcan railcars were operated by the New Zealand Government Railways (NZR) in the South Island of New Zealand. All New Zealand railcars are classified as RM (Rail Motor), and this class derived their nomenclature from the name of the manufacturer, the Vulcan Foundry of Britain.

== Background ==
On 9 May 1938, the Minister of Railways announced an order for ten railcars from the Vulcan Foundry of Britain. Six railcars of the Standard type were under construction at the Hutt Workshops but delays in deliveries of materials and equipment from England meant it was impracticable to build more cars in New Zealand. The order for ten more railcars was therefore placed overseas.

The first Vulcan railcar arrived in New Zealand in September 1940. Three more arrived by April 1941, with all nine members in operation by the second half of 1942. Ten railcars were built, but only nine arrived in New Zealand as the ship carrying the tenth was sunk during World War II.

== Description ==
The Vulcan railcars had a driver's compartment at each end, so they did not need to be turned at the terminus for the return journey. They originally had 28 and 22 seats in the two passenger compartments. In the mid-1950s the smaller compartment in each vehicle was reduced by 2 seats and replaced with a small guard's compartment, thus reducing the total number of passengers from 50 to 48. A luggage compartment had space for about 1 ton of luggage, and an onboard toilet was provided.

The original livery was plain Midland red with a grey roof and black undergear. From 1951 onwards, as they came in for overhauls, they were repainted Carnation red with silver or off-white stripes on the sides and ends, and silver or white roofs.

They had a low axle loading to allow them to operate on the light track and bridges on the Stillwater–Westport Line to provide a proposed new Greymouth–Westport service, once the building of the line was completed. Hence the power bogie was built with three axles with an intermediate carrying axle (with flangeless wheels) instead of two axles as originally proposed. They were designed to operate at speeds of up to 120 km/h (75 mph), though in service they were restricted to a maximum speed of 88 km/h (55 mph), which was still fast for rural New Zealand railway lines at the time.

== Speed records ==
On trials on 25 October 1940, RM 50 achieved a speed of 125.5 km/h (78 mph) on a section of the Midland Line east of Springfield. This remains the fastest speed officially attained on New Zealand's railway network.

== Operation ==
Before all members of the class had arrived, from 28 October 1940 Vulcan and Midland railcars alternated the Christchurch–Greymouth–Hokitika services along the Midland Line and the Ross Branch. A Vulcan railcar ran on Mondays, Wednesdays and Fridays, and a smaller Midland railcar ran on the other days. By September 1942, the Vulcans had fully taken over the service and the Midland railcars were withdrawn and then scrapped.

From 7 September 1942, wartime petrol restrictions meant the Vulcans were put into service on the Stillwater–Westport Line between Greymouth and Westport (150 km or 93 miles), even though the line through the Buller Gorge technically wasn't finished and hadn't been handed over to the Railways Department from the Public Works Department. Early morning and mid-afternoon services were provided in each direction daily. With double running (two cars coupled together) this meant four vehicles could be required for these services, which connected with Christchurch–Greymouth passenger express trains at Stillwater. Also due to the petrol restrictions, a service between Christchurch and Timaru was instituted and the Hokitika run extended all the way to Ross. After the war ended, the West Coast services continued to operate, but the Timaru run ceased.

On 20 February 1956, the new articulated 88 seater railcars replaced the Vulcans on the Christchurch–Greymouth–Ross services. This allowed freed-up Vulcan railcars to provide daily Dunedin–Cromwell passenger services along the Otago Central Line (250 km or 155 miles) from 1 October 1956. From 11 May 1958, the services were cut back to Dunedin–Alexandra (220 km or 136 miles) due to low passenger numbers beyond Alexandra.

On 29 September 1958, a weekday morning service commenced using Vulcans on part of the Main South Line from Palmerston to Dunedin, and a return service run in the evening. The railcars were also used for Dunedin suburban services – notably a midday service to Port Chalmers – whenever they were available for such use.

The Vulcan railcars were never used in the North Island, where the Standard railcars performed a similar role.

== Incidents ==
The nine Vulcans saw a number of incidents and accidents during their operational lives. RM 53 was gutted by fire on 6 May 1947 while working a Greymouth–Christchurch service, and RM 57 was gutted by fire on 29 June 1955 also while working a Greymouth–Christchurch service. In both cases the vehicles were rebuilt at Addington workshops and returned to service three years after the fire. RM 53 hit a large rock on the Taieri Gorge run to Alexandra about 1972, and was repaired. RM 53 caught fire a second time on 11 January 1978 while working a Christchurch–Greymouth service, and was written off after this.

RM 50 (leading) and RM 58 (trailing) were working in multiple on a Ross–Christchurch service on 23 April 1957 when they suffered motor failure, and then brake failure, while climbing the 1 in 33 grade up through the Otira Tunnel. The cars ran back to Otira out of control where they were diverted into the runaway siding at the Otira yard, where RM 58 derailed. There were no serious injuries.

In April 1957, three derailments of Vulcans on the Otago Central Line led to the postponement of railcar services while the line was upgraded. Services did not resume until 10 November 1957.

RM 58 was written off following a level crossing collision on 15 February 1971, in which the railcar driver was killed. RM 57 collided with the rear of a goods train in August 1974, and RM 52 was involved in a level crossing collision between Wairuna and Clinton in February 1976.

== Withdrawal and preservation ==
By the end of the 1960s, road coaches could provide a similar service to the Vulcan and 88-seater railcars, at much lower cost. The 88-seater railcars were also being phased out, despite being newer, because their operating and engine renewal costs could not be justified.

Greymouth–Westport passenger services ceased in July 1967, allowing Vulcans to replace the 88-seater railcars on the Christchurch–Picton (Main North Line) railcar service, except during summer holidays when short trains were substituted. This continued until 7 June 1976, when the Vulcans ran this service for the last time.

A need to conserve the remaining life in 88-seater railcars for weekend services on the Christchurch–Greymouth route meant that, from 1975, the Vulcans were used on some Invercargill–Dunedin–Christchurch (Main South Line) services to supplement the 88-seater railcars. The use of Vulcans on the Otago Central Line, and between Christchurch and Invercargill, ceased in April 1976. The last use of a Vulcan was on the Greymouth–Christchurch evening service on 9 September 1978, ending nearly 38 years of heavy use of Vulcans in the rural South Island.

Four of the nine Vulcan railcars were preserved, one by The Plains Vintage Railway & Historical Museum (RM 50) and three by the Ferrymead Railway (RM 51, RM 56, RM 57). RM 50, RM51 and RM 56 see regular use.
