= NZR RM class (Standard) =

NZR RM class Standard
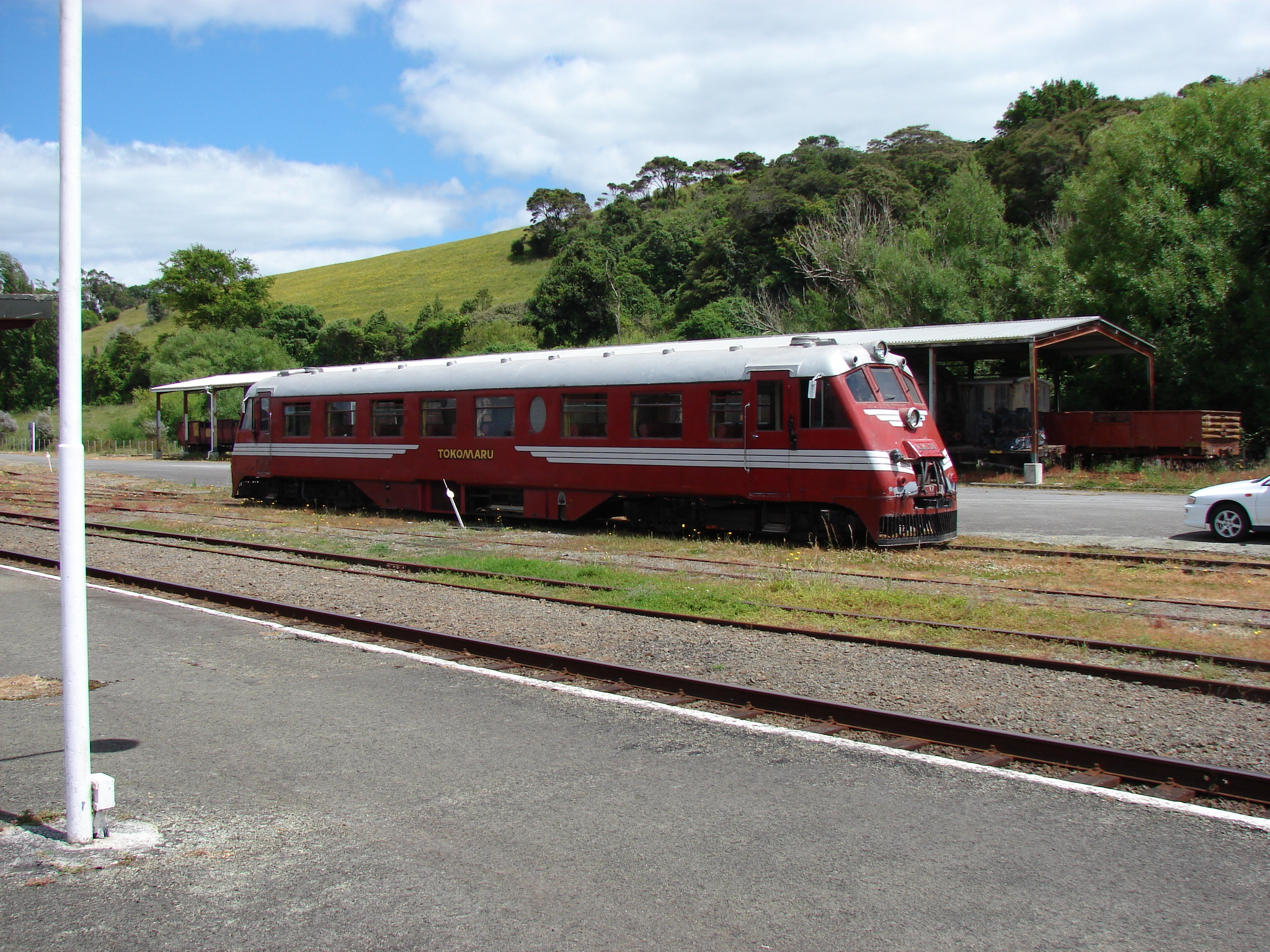
- RM 31 (Tokomaru) at the Pahiatua Railcar Society
- In service: 1938–1972
- Manufacturer: New Zealand Government Railways
- Built at: Hutt Workshops
- Constructed: 1938
- Number built: 6
- Number in service: None
- Number preserved: 4
- Fleet numbers: 30–35
- Capacity: 48–52 passengers
- Operator: New Zealand Government Railways

Specifications
- Car length: 67 ft 11 in (20.70 m)
- Width: 8 ft 9 in (2.67 m)
- Maximum speed: 62 mph (100 km/h)
- Weight: 30 tonnes (30 long tons; 33 short tons)
- Prime mover: Two Meadows 6-cylinder engines
- Power output: 85 kW (114 hp) (×2)
- Transmission: Mechanical
- UIC classification: A1-1A
- Multiple working: Yes
- Track gauge: 3 ft 6 in (1,067 mm)

The NZR RM class Standard railcars were a class of railcar operated by the New Zealand Railways Department (NZR) in the North Island of New Zealand. Officially classified as RM like all other railcar classes in New Zealand, they acquired the designation of "Standard" to differentiate them from other railcar classes. They were introduced in 1938 and withdrawn in 1972.

== Background ==
Since the 1912 experiments with a MacEwan-Pratt petrol railcar, the New Zealand Railways Department had been seeking an effective and successful railcar design. Many routes simply did not have the demand to economically justify locomotive-hauled passenger express trains, so railcars were seen as a viable alternative. New Zealand's difficult terrain posed problems to railcar design, but in 1936, the Wairarapa railcars were introduced and proved to be a great success on the Wairarapa Line from Wellington over the Rimutaka Incline to the Wairarapa, and following from this, the Standard railcars were designed to provide regional services in on regular lines in the North Island. NZR placed an order for the six railcars in 1937.

== Design ==
Six in total were built in the NZR Hutt Workshops in 1938 and 1939, each with a semi-streamlined design featuring slanting ends. Each car had two compartments, the larger with 36 seats (second class) and the smaller with 12 seats (first class) or 16 seats (second class). The first two railcars were initially first and second class, but later became second-class only. The other railcars were always second-class in both compartments.

Driving controls were located at each end of the railcar so that they did not have to be turned at terminuses. Each was powered by two diesel engines, mounted on the bogies. During their service lives, they wore out three sets of engines; the original Leyland engines were replaced with Meadows engines.

The original silver body colour with a green stripe was inconspicuous and was soon replaced by plain red with grey or black roofs. In 1951, the Standard railcars became red with silver (later white) stripes and a grey roof as used on other railcar types and some locomotives.

All six of the Standard railcars were named after Māori canoes:

- Aotea
- Tokomaru
- Pangatoru
- Takitimu
- Tainui
- Tikitere

== Operation ==
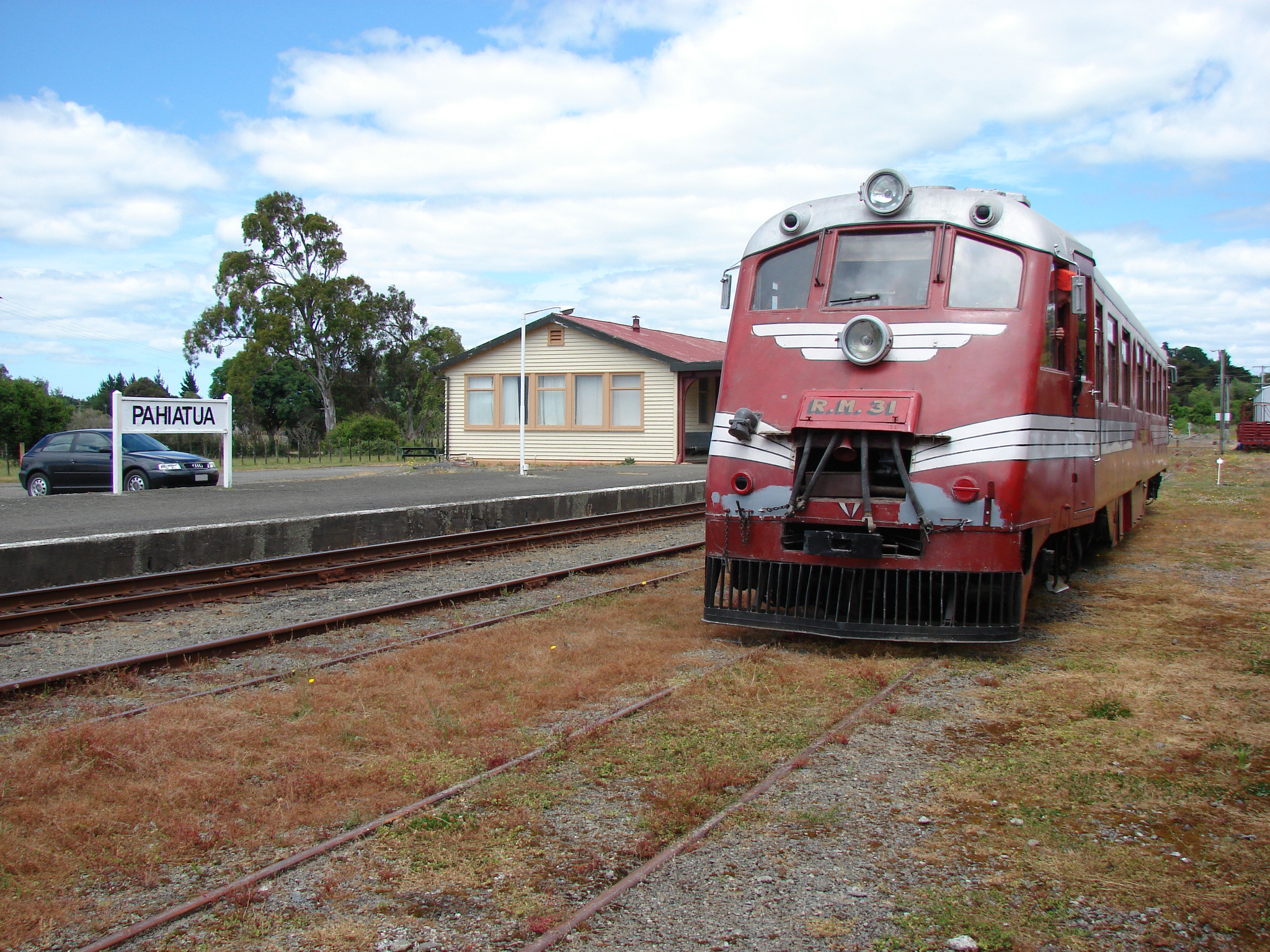
RM 31 (Tokomaru) going for a run through the Pahiatua station yard.

The Standard railcars were first used to operate a fast return service from Wellington to New Plymouth, and soon a Hawkes Bay service between Wairoa and Napier was added, along with a Sundays-only return service from Napier to Wellington. In 1943, the Wairoa-Napier service was extended to serve Gisborne.

From 1950, the original Leyland were replaced with more powerful Meadows engines.

In 1955, the 88 seater railcars were introduced, and 88 seaters and Standards initially shared duties on the New Plymouth and Hawkes Bay services, but soon the 88 seaters took over all of the Hawkes Bay services and the Standard railcars were left to run the New Plymouth route. After the opening of the Rimutaka Tunnel in November 1955, both the 88 seater and Standard railcars soon took over from the Wairarapa railcars and operated a service from Wellington to Palmerston North via the Wairarapa.

The Standard railcars never operated in the South Island, as the Vulcan railcars were built to operate rural services on that island.

== Record runs ==
In September 1938, RM 30 covered the 321 km between Napier and Wellington in 4 hours and 36 minutes running time. In 1967, RM 30 took a group of railway enthusiasts from Auckland to Wellington in 9 hours and 26 minutes (running time 8 hours and 42 minutes). The average speed including stops was 44.8 mph (72.1 km/h) and the average running speed 48.6 mph (78.2 km/h). Top speed was 65 mph (105 km/h) and the highest average passing speed was 63.4 mph (102.0 km/h), over the 4.4 mi (7.1 km) between Manurewa and Papakura, which took 4 mins 10 secs. The northbound run took 10 hrs 19 mins, including a 37 min stop at Taumarunui.

== Withdrawal and preservation ==
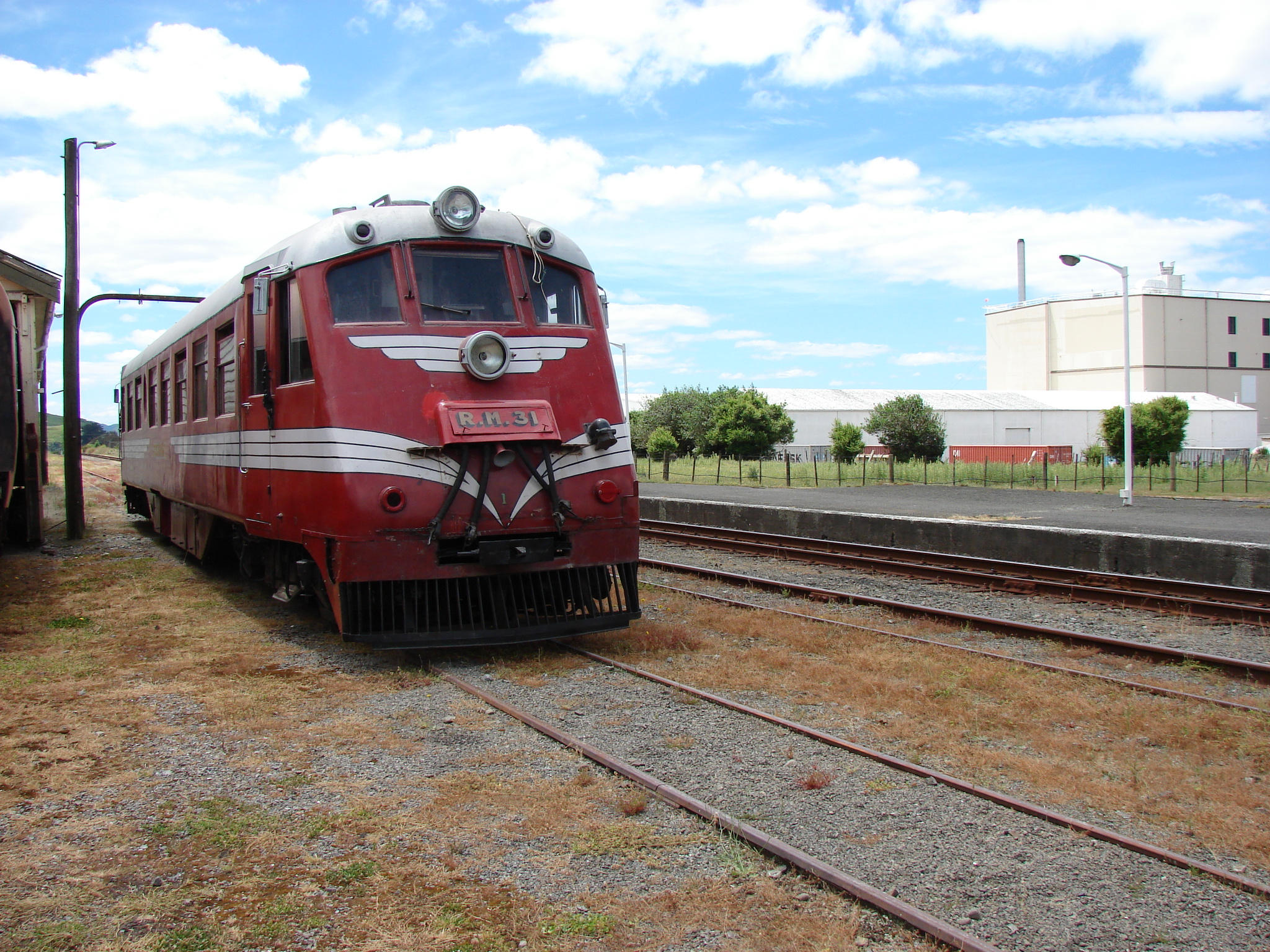
RM 31 (Tokomaru) at Pahiatua.

The Standard railcars were withdrawn in December 1972, being replaced on the Wellington-New Plymouth service by 88-seater railcars upgraded as "Blue Streaks" and two-thirds of the class have been preserved.

Two cars, RM 30 Aotea and RM 34 Tainui were purchased by the New Zealand Railway and Locomotive Society Wellington Branch in 1972 for their heritage project in the Hutt Valley, then located at Gracefield on the industrial branch line of the same name. RM 32 Pangatoru was purchased by the NZR&LS Waikato Branch and displayed at their Te Awamutu Railway Museum until 1991, when it moved to Te Rapa locomotive depot for a proposed overhaul that never eventuated.

The late John Murphy purchased the other three cars - RM 31 Tokomaru, RM 33 Takitimu, and RM 35 Tikitere - in December 1972 for preservation, along with many spare parts and instruction manuals. Although he wanted to keep all three cars, he was later forced to scrap RM 33 and RM 35 as he was unable to look after them. Also, while RM 33 was still potentially operable, RM 35 had been involved in an accident during its last months of service, and its frame was bent in such a way that would have prevented it from running again; even if it was feasible to repair the damage, it would have been beyond John's means to repair it or pay for it to be repaired.

Today, RM 30 resides on the Silver Stream Railway in Wellington and is commonly used on running days. RM 32 is now located at the Glenbrook Vintage Railway south of Auckland; the railcar moved there in 2001 after the proposed overhaul fell through and the Te Rapa loco depot was demolished, requiring it to find a new home. Work started on restoring RM 32 at GVR, this stopped and there are no current plans for this to resume.

Rm 31 was for a time held at Masterton but was later placed on loan to the Pahiatua Railcar Society at Pahiatua. When John died, the car was bequeathed to the PRS along with the manuals and spare parts, some of which came from RM 33 and RM 35, that John had accumulated. The car attended the 2008 North Island Main Trunk centenary celebrations, but at the time was not mainline certified. It was finally brought up to mainline standards in late 2011, and ditch lights mounted in the headstocks. The railcar then underwent mainline trials and crew training. Its first revenue run as a heritage rail vehicle took place on 12 February 2012. As part of the mainline qualifications, RM 31 has been fitted with an events recorder, train radio, and ditch lights at either end. These are recessed into the railcar's front fairings so as not to detract from the original character of the railcar.

RM 34 also resided at the Silver Stream Railway along with RM 30, but only saw occasional use. For many years it was undergoing a slow overhaul, until 2019 when the Silver Stream Railway donated the railcar to the Pahiatua Railcar Society. Pahiatua Railcar Society eventually plans to overhaul RM 34 to join RM 31 on mainline excursions.
