= NZR RM class (Edison battery-electric) =

Edison battery-electric railcar
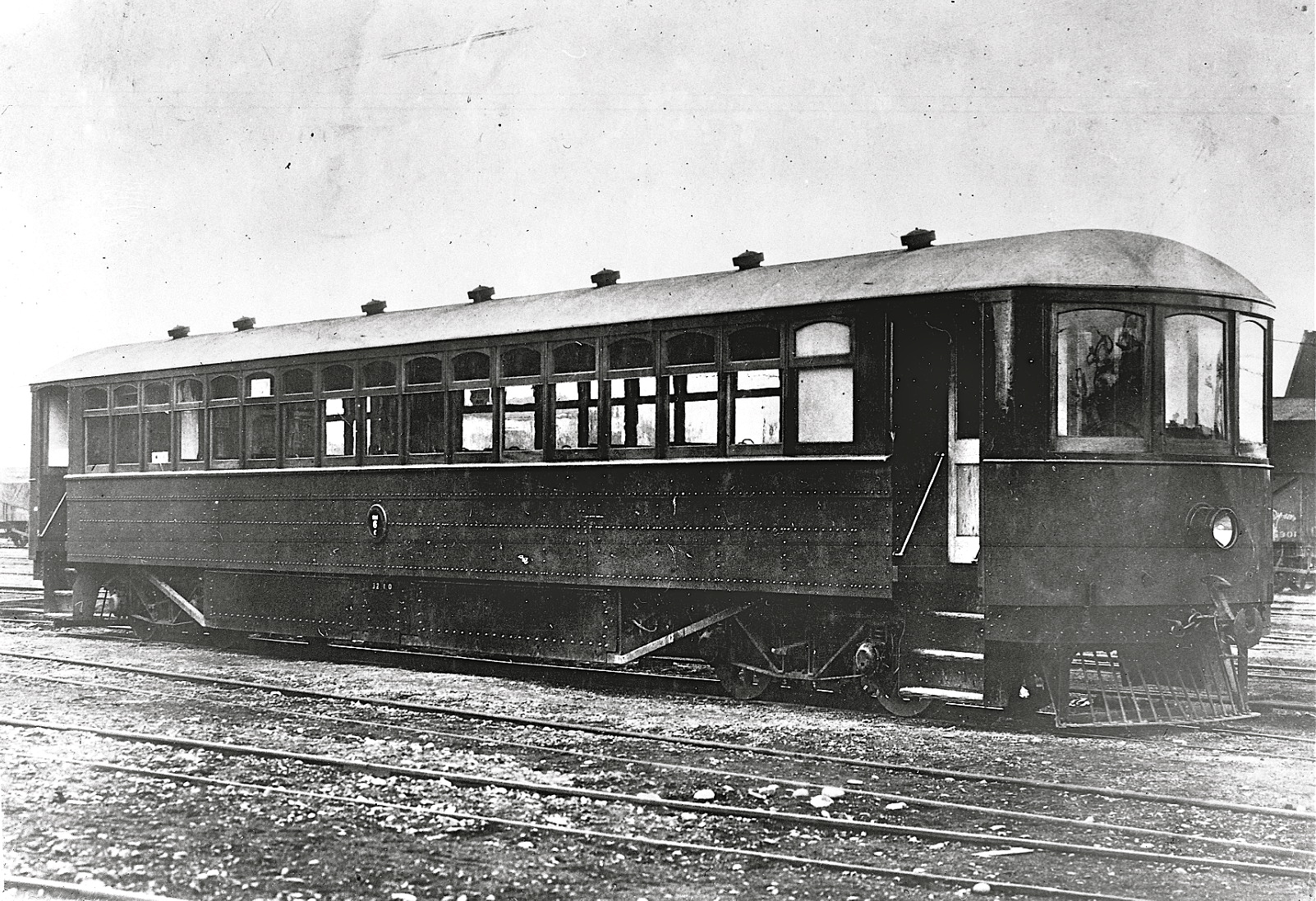
- NZR RM 6, Edison battery-electric railcar in 1926. AP Godber Collection, Alexander Turnbull Library.
Type and origin
- Power type: Battery-electric
- Builder: Boon & Stevens
- Build date: 1926
Specifications
- Configuration
  - UIC: Bo-Bo
- Gauge: 3 ft 6 in (1,067 mm)
- Length: 55 ft 4 in over headstocks
Performance figures
- Maximum speed: 45 mph (72 km/h)
Career
- Number in class: 1
- Numbers: RM 6
- First run: 17 June 1926
- Last run: May 1934
- Scrapped: December 1942

The NZR RM class Edison battery-electric railcar was a railcar that ran in Canterbury, New Zealand for eight years. It was built for New Zealand Railways (NZR) as a prototype for battery-electric railcars. While the railcar, classified "RM 6", was considered the first successful railcar in New Zealand, it was later destroyed in a fire, and battery-electric traction for railcars was not developed further in New Zealand. Two other classes of battery-electric locomotives were introduced about the same time as RM 6, the E class of 1922 and the E^{B} class of 1925.

== Background ==
In the 1920s, NZR began experimenting with railcars as a way of replacing mixed trains that carried both passengers and goods and ran too slow schedules as they had to load and unload freight regularly. In December 1923 a former NZR employee, Ambrose Reeves Harris, who was a personal assistant to Thomas Edison and was working for the Edison company, wrote to Minister of Railways Gordon Coates suggesting battery-electric traction for a railcar similar to Electric Car & Locomotive Corporation's railcars in the United States.

The proposal did not meet with favour from NZR's Chief Mechanical Engineer (CME), who pointed out that the estimated cost of such a railcar was 3.6 times that of the Sentinel-Cammell railcar that was on order.

== Design ==
The railcar had a wheel arrangement of Bo-Bo under the UIC classification system, weighed 32 tonnes (31 long tons; 35 short tons), had driving controls at each end, and an engine output of 90 kW (120 hp), it travelled comfortably at 60 km/h (37 mph), and had a maximum design speed of 80 km/h. The battery gave about five hours use, then required seven hours to recharge.

In appearance, it looked like a cross between a regular railway passenger carriage and a tram; side-on, it looked like a passenger carriage, but each end resembled the front of a tram from that era. The body was built by Boon & Stevens, the noted tram-car builders of Christchurch, in 1926, and equipped with Edison battery-electric equipment.

Capable of carrying about 70 passengers, with 60 seated, and a separate smoking compartment, the railcar had a range of about 100 miles (160 km) on one battery charge. A layover of about 4 hours was needed to recharge the battery. When introduced the railcar was billed as capable of being used on the Christchurch-Little River and Christchurch-Rangiora runs as well as being available for charters to other North Canterbury destinations. Being electrically powered and running on a storage battery, the railcar was very quiet, with the only wheel noise being noticeable when in motion.

The New Zealand Railways claimed it could cover the 36 miles (58 km), 12 stops, journey between Christchurch and Little River in 1 hour and 7 minutes at an "average throughout speed" of 30 miles per hour (48 km/h). They also claimed that passengers could board in 8 seconds or less stating "the stop at one of the smaller outlying stations to pick up a passenger was so brief as to be barely perceptible." Timed through 2.7 km (1.7 mi) Lyttelton tunnel with a heavy load of passengers, it took 3 min 45 sec, an average speed of 43 km/h (27 mph).

== In service ==
The railcar was initially built in 1926 to operate services through the lengthy Lyttelton rail tunnel on the Lyttelton Line. While performing well on the service, the railcar lacked seating capacity, especially for peak-hour services. The Lyttelton Tunnel was electrified in 1929 and the railcar was instead assigned to the Little River Branch, commencing services in early 1927. Previously, the Little River Branch's passenger services had been provided by mixed trains, and the Edison battery-electric railcar was introduced as a faster and more desirable alternative. It ran between Little River and Christchurch twice each way each day, completing the journey in 69 minutes.

The railcar was popular with both passengers and crews; it was fast for its time for a rural train on New Zealand's railway network and ran cleanly and efficiently.

== Withdrawal ==
It lasted a mere eight years, as it was destroyed in a depot fire in Christchurch on 25 May 1934.

Conditions created by the Great Depression meant it simply was not possible to build a replacement, and the Edison battery-electric railcar's legacy was left as that of a promising and unique experiment that may have achieved its full potential in more prosperous times. The railcar's remains were not scrapped until the end of 1942.

== Remnants ==
The bogies of the car were dumped on the Oamaru foreshore with other old locomotive remains to prevent erosion of the Oamaru railway yards. In 2009, the bogies of RM 6 and the locomotive remnants were removed from the foreshore. The locomotive remnants were placed in the care of the Oamaru Steam and Rail Restoration Society while the bogies were donated to the National Railway Museum of New Zealand, and placed in storage at Ferrymead Heritage Park, awaiting refurbishment.
