= NZR RM class (Wairarapa) =

NZR RM class Wairarapa
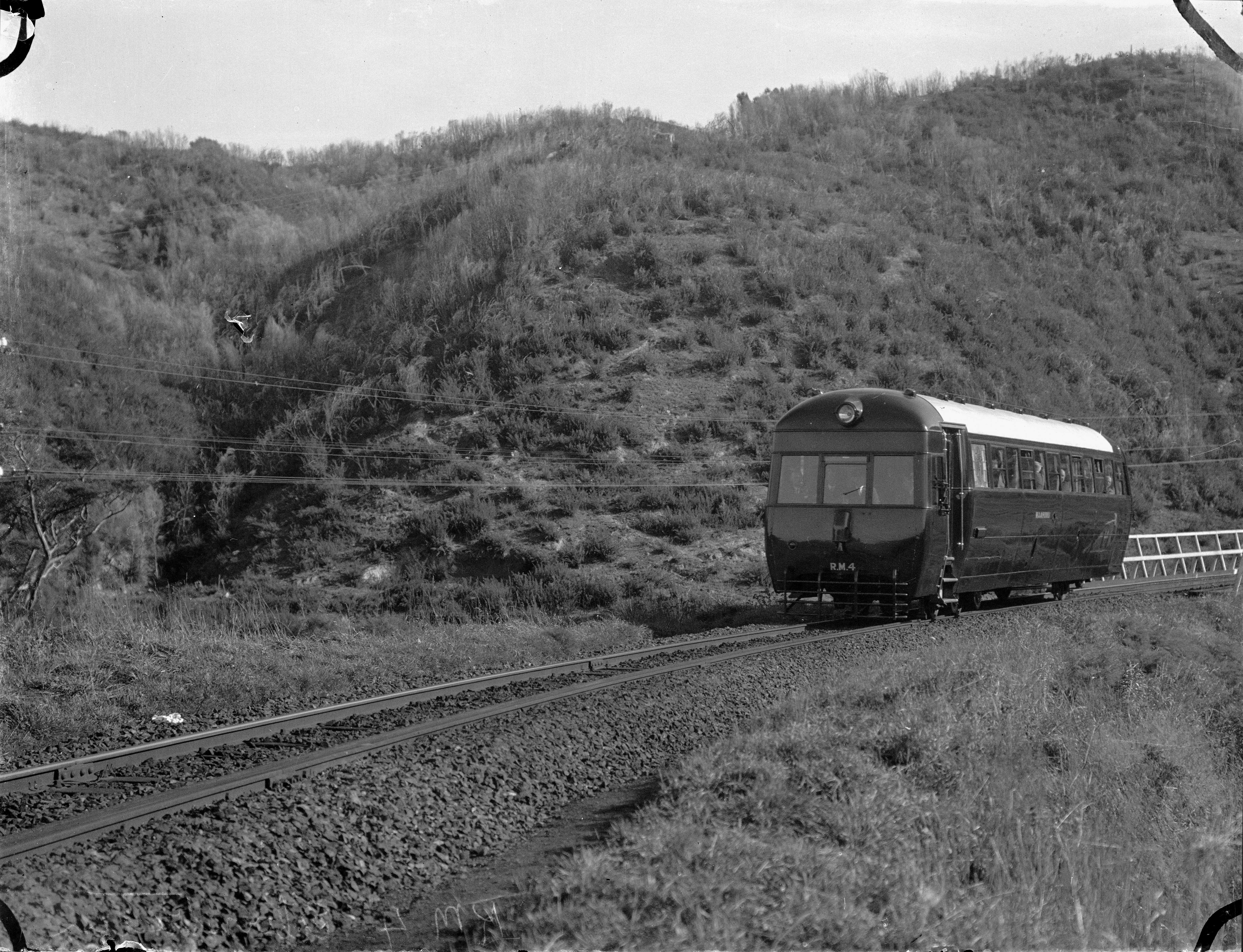
- Wairarapa railcar RM 4 "Maahunui" in 1936 on a test run.
- In service: 7 September 1936 – November 1955
- Manufacturer: New Zealand Government Railways
- Built at: Hutt Workshops
- Entered service: 7 September–December 1936 (RM 4–9); March 1937 (RM 10)
- Number built: 7
- Number in service: None
- Number preserved: 1
- Fleet numbers: RM 4–RM 10
- Capacity: RM 4–9: 49 passengers RM 10: 20 passengers, 3 tons freight
- Operator: New Zealand Government Railways
- Lines served: Rimutaka Incline; Wairarapa Line

Specifications
- Car length: 57 ft 11 in (17.65 m) over buffers
- Maximum speed: 60 mph (97 km/h)
- Weight: 13.56 tonnes (13.35 long tons; 14.95 short tons)
- Prime movers: Originally six-cylinder 10-litre Leyland petrol engine From 1940–41, six-cylinder 10-litre Leyland Diesel engine
- Power output: 130 hp (97 kW) (petrol); 119 hp (89 kW) (diesel)
- Transmission: Mechanical
- UIC classification: 2-A
- Bogies: One bogie (front, unpowered), one single axle (rear, powered)
- Multiple working: No
- Track gauge: 3 ft 6 in (1,067 mm)

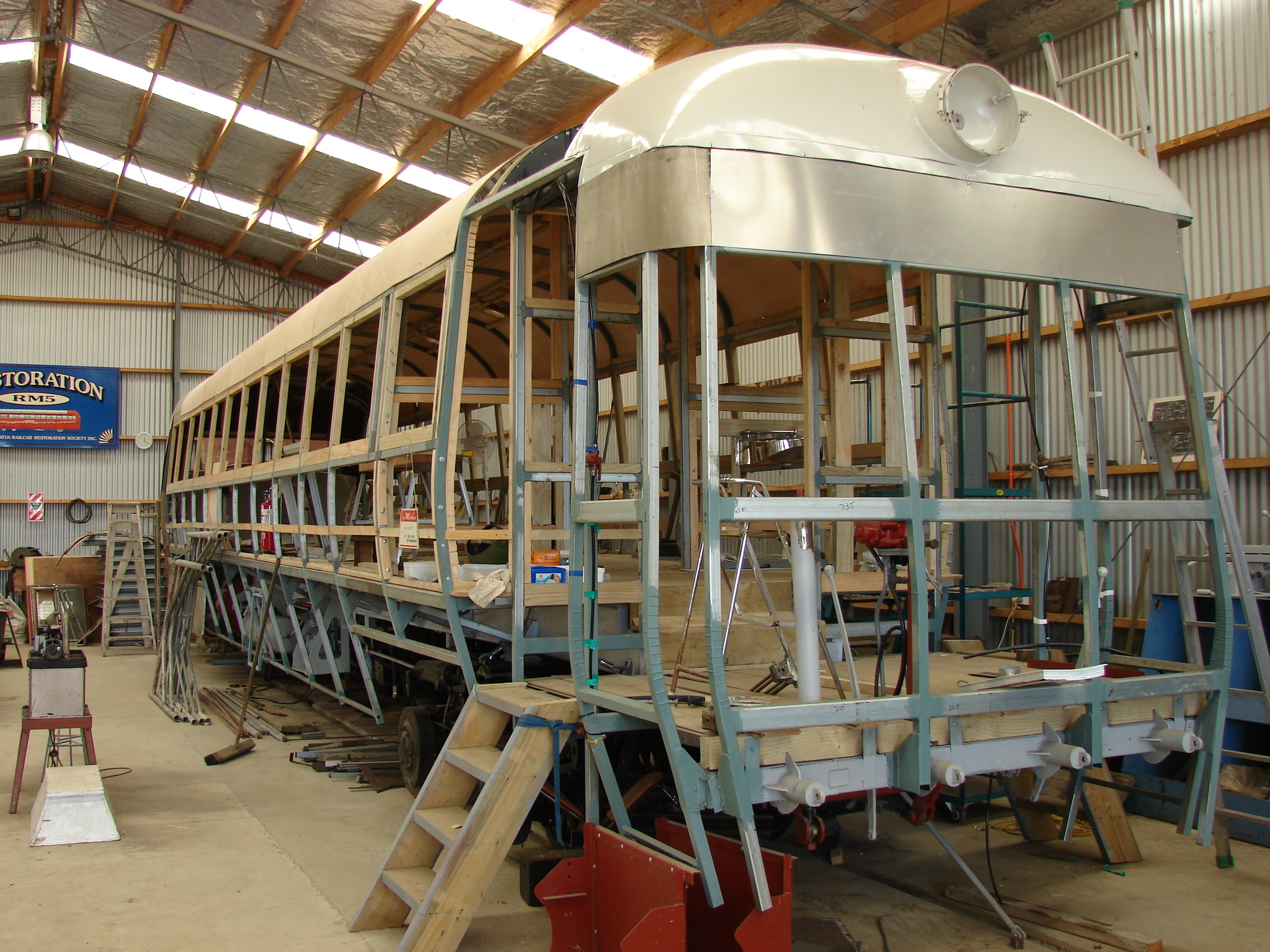
The sole surviving Wairarapa railcar, RM 5 (Mahuhu), undergoing restoration at the Pahiatua Railcar Society

The NZR RM class Wairarapa railcar was a class of railcars on New Zealand's national rail network. They entered service in 1936 (three weeks after the Midland railcars) and were classified RM like all other classes of railcars in New Zealand; they came to be known as the "Wairarapa" class as they were designed to operate over the famous Rimutaka Incline to the Wairarapa region on the Wairarapa Line. They also acquired the nickname of "tin hares" in New Zealand railfan jargon. The first two to be introduced re-used the numbers RM 4 and RM 5 that had previously been used by the withdrawn experimental Model T Ford railcars. The class consisted of six passenger railcars and one passenger-freight railcar. It is often described incorrectly as a class of six railcars.

== Background ==
The Rimutaka Incline over the Rimutaka Ranges posed a severe time delay to any service operating between Wellington and the Wairarapa region. At one end of the Incline, a train had to have its engine replaced by multiple members of the H class, as the H class locomotives were specially designed to work the steep and difficult Incline. Once they hauled the train the length of the Incline, they were then replaced by a single ordinary engine. The procedure to attach and remove the H class locomotives, as well as the actual trip along the Incline, was very slow.

The Wairarapa railcars were designed as an answer to this problem. They were intended to operate along the length of the Incline and take over Wairarapa passenger services from regular carriage trains. Their body was built higher than an ordinary railcar, with a raised floor, to enable them to pass over the raised Fell centre rail on the Rimutaka Incline. In design, they resembled a bus, and unlike a usual single-unit railcar that has a driving compartment at each end, the Wairarapa railcars only had one driving end, necessitating that they be turned at the terminus of their journey.

The first six of the class (RM 4 to RM 9) were designed to carry 49 passengers with their baggage. Like the Standard railcars, the Wairapara railcars were named after historic Māori canoes:

- Maahunui
- Mahuhu
- Mamari
- Matahourua
- Maatua
- Arai-te-Uru.

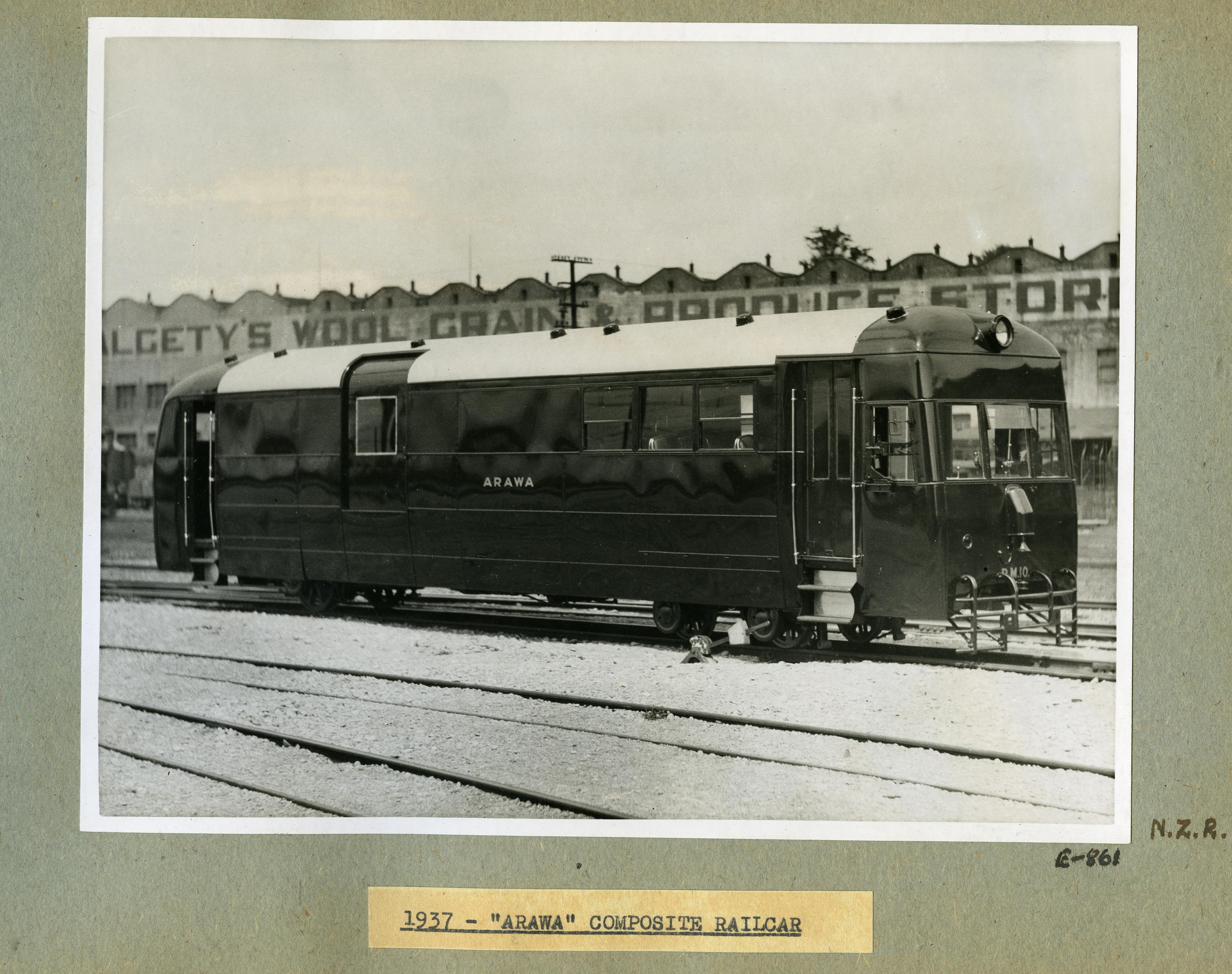
Wairarapa railcar RM 10, "Arawa" in 1937.

A seventh railcar, RM 10, named Arawa, was built as a mixed freight and passenger vehicle with seating for 20 passengers at the front, a freight compartment with a capacity of 3 tons in the centre, and a guards compartment at the rear.

== Operation ==
Upon their introduction to revenue service on 7 September 1936, the Wairarapa railcars became the second successful class of railcars in New Zealand, following the introduction of the Midland class three weeks earlier. The Wairarapa railcars immediately slashed running times between Wellington and the Wairarapa, and would operate the full length of the Wairarapa Line from Wellington to Woodville, and then utilise the Palmerston North–Gisborne Line through the Manawatū Gorge to access Palmerston North. They proved popular with passengers, fully replacing a locomotive-hauled carriage train known as the Wairarapa Mail in 1948, though local mixed trains continued to operate.

The composite passenger-goods railcar RM 10 entered service on 1 March 1937. Although able to traverse the Rimutaka Incline like the other six Wairarapa class railcars, RM 10 worked between Cross Creek and Masterton carrying mainly school children, parcels and light freight, and cans of milk and cream. This railcar was withdrawn from service at the end of 1946 when it was found that a locomotive was having to run between Cross Creek and Masterton at the same time as the railcar, to attend to shunting duties. The resulting mixed train (goods with passenger car attached) was subsequently referred to locally as The Arawa.

== Withdrawal and preservation ==
The replacement of the Rimutaka Incline by the Rimutaka Tunnel in November 1955 meant that the main reason for the Wairarapa railcars' operation ceased to exist. Locomotive hauled trains were now competitive in timings with the railcars, which were soon withdrawn from service. By 1956, the six remaining cars were in storage at Hutt Workshops awaiting an uncertain future. They became increasingly derelict, as they were stored outside and vandals removed small parts from the railcars.

In 1969, the Wellington Branch of the New Zealand Railway and Locomotive Society purchased the remains of RM 4, 5, 6, and 9 for preservation at their Gracefield site. To move the cars from Hutt Shops to Gracefield, the NZR&LS members physically shunted the railcars from the works to Gracefield, as the railcars' diesel engines were not at that time operable. When the group shifted to Seaview, RM 5 (by then working again) was used as an impromptu shunting engine to move the group's collection.

After arrival, it was decided to restore RM 5 Mahuhu to working order as it was felt to be in the best condition. RM 4 (which had been damaged in a level crossing collision before withdrawal), RM 6, and RM 9 Arai-te-uru were relegated to being spare parts sources.

RM 4 and RM 6 were scrapped in the 1970s after all re-usable components were stripped from their hulks, while RM 5 and RM 9 were placed into storage at the Silver Stream Railway (SSR). With no plans for the SSR to restore either, the decision was made in September 1992 to lease RM 5 to the newly formed Pahiatua Railcar Society, who would then restore it to mainline operating standards. The car arrived at Pahiatua in September 1992, and work began to slowly restore the car to operable condition.

As RM 5 was missing many parts, the decision was made in 2002 to acquire the remains of RM 9 for use as a spare parts source to complete the restoration of RM 5. Arriving in 2003, the incomplete frames of RM 9 became a source of spare parts that could be duplicated or restored for use on its sister car. There are no plans to restore RM 9 in its own right as a rail vehicle, and it will most likely be scrapped once it is no longer useful.

Originally, the Wairarapa railcars had wooden internal framing covered with steel sheathing. RM 5's body had decayed so far the decision was made to replace the original wooden framing with steel. This improves the railcar's crashworthiness, quite apart from being less maintenance-intensive. Restoration of RM 5 was completed in 2017 after an effort spanning 26 years.
