= NZR RM class (McEwan Pratt) =

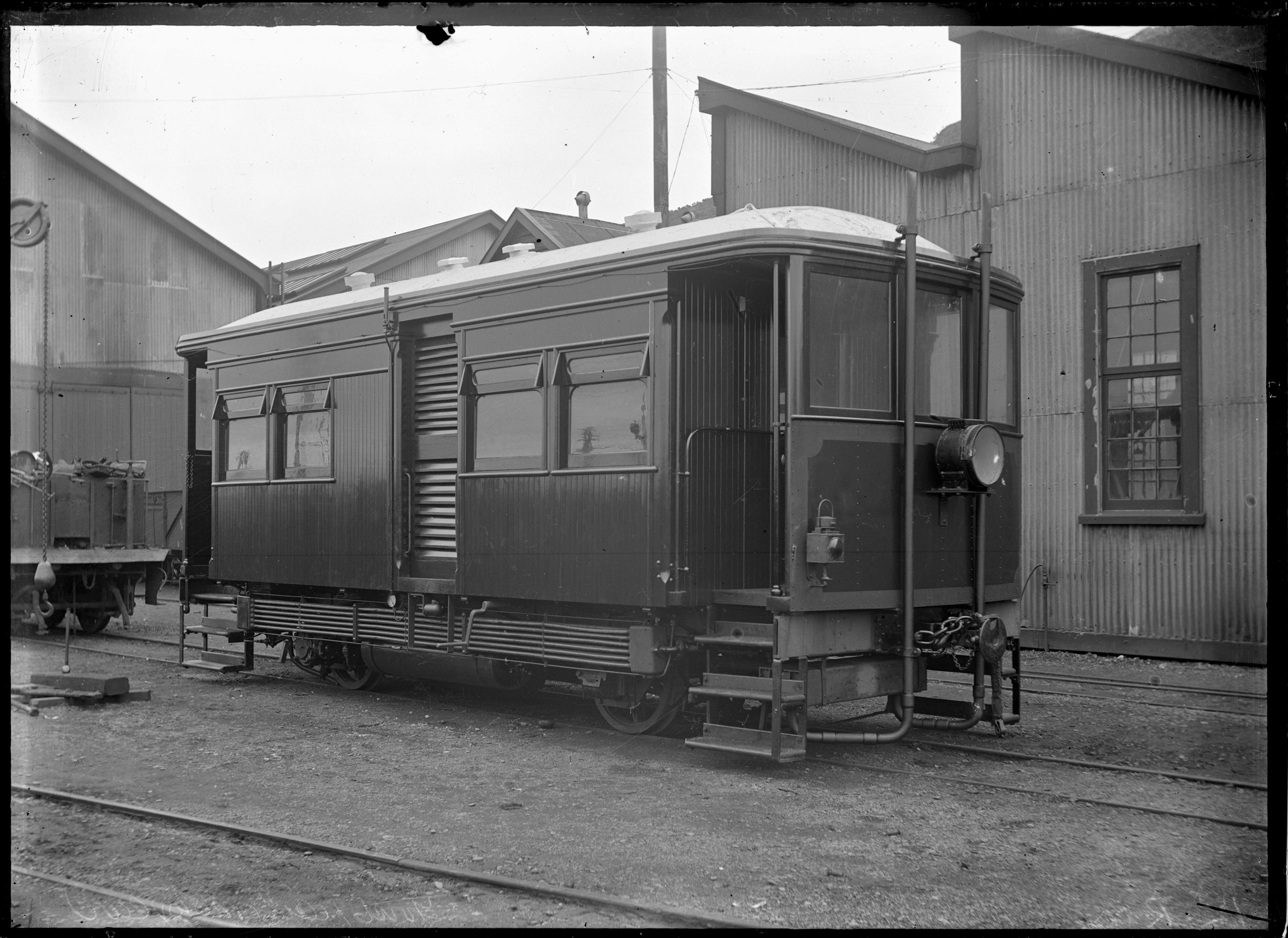
NZR RM class (McEwan Pratt)

The NZR RM class McEwan Pratt petrol rail motor (misspelt as MacEwan-Pratt by some authors) was the first rail motor to run on New Zealand's national rail network, though it was never used in revenue service. It was built in 1912 at a time when the New Zealand Railways Department (NZR) was seeking alternative methods of providing rural passenger transportation. "Mixed" trains that carried both passengers and freight were typical on country branch lines as there was not sufficient traffic to justify a separate passenger train, but the schedule delays caused by loading and unloading freight during the journey made the mixed trains undesirable.

== Introduction ==
NZR began investigating whether railcars could provide a more efficient passenger service with low operating costs. At the time, railcar technology was new and the rugged nature of New Zealand's terrain made the task of finding a successful design more difficult.

The railcar's four-cylinder petrol engine and running gear were supplied by the English company McEwan Pratt, a predecessor of Baguley Cars Ltd. Its 4.87-metre long wooden body, which resembled a tram of that era, was built at the Railways Department's Newmarket Workshops. The engine was located in the middle of the railcar with transmission provided by chain drive to just one of the two axles. A total of twelve people could be seated in the gas-illuminated passenger compartment, and driver's controls were at just one end despite the tram resemblance. On a trial run between Frankton and Putāruru in early 1913, it reached a speed of 50 km/h, at the time a fast speed for a rural line in New Zealand. It then broke down, and after attempts to fix it were fruitless, research in different directions was undertaken. NZR dismantled it in May 1913.
