= NZR B class (1899) =

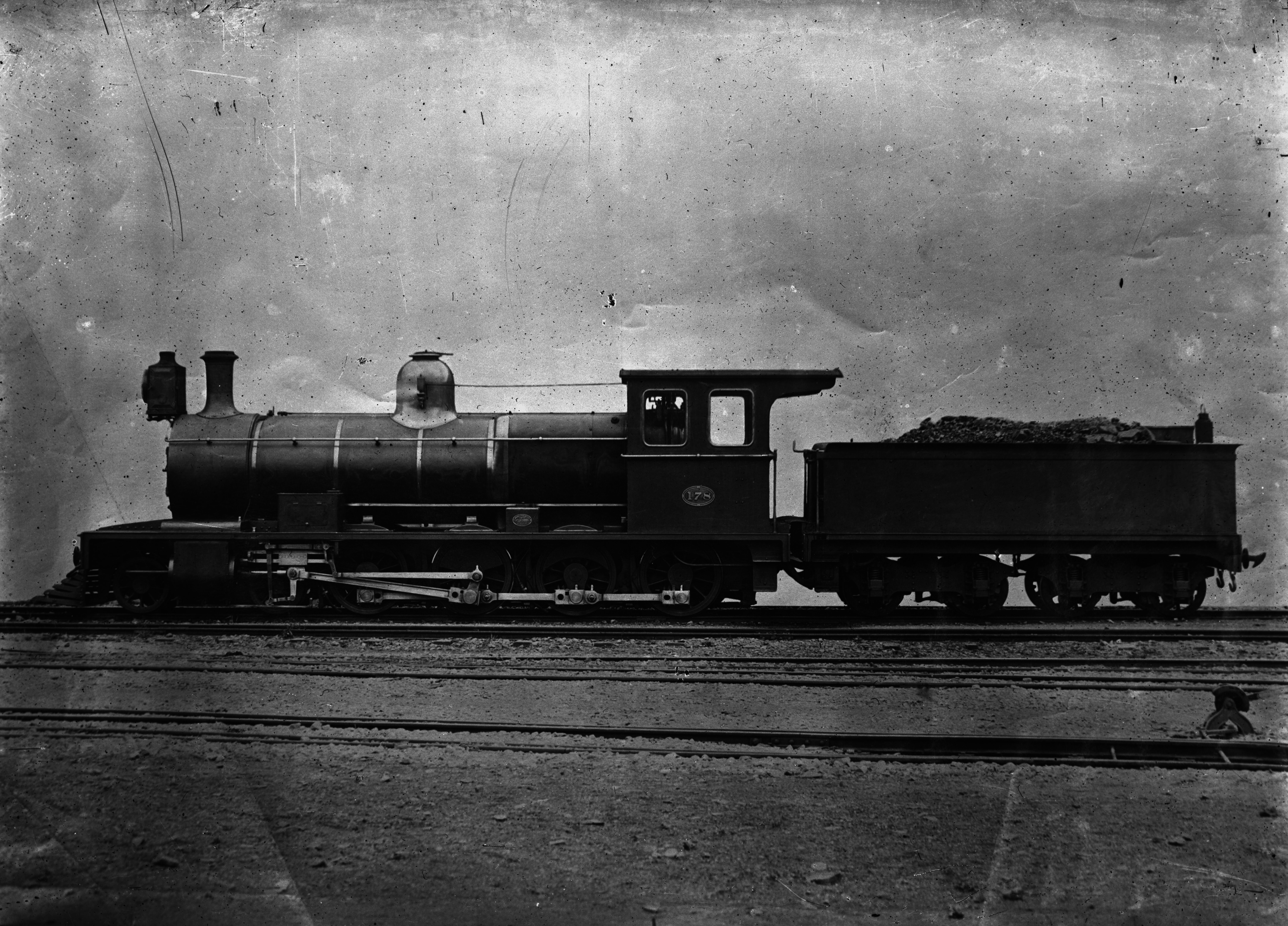
- B class 4-8-0 steam locomotive, NZR number 178
Type and origin
- Power type: Steam
- Builder: NZR Addington Workshops (6); Sharp, Stewart & Co. (4)
- Build date: 1899 (5), 1901 (1), 1902 (2), 1903 (2)
- Total produced: 10
Specifications
- Configuration
  - Whyte: 4-8-0
- Gauge: 3 ft 6 in (1,067 mm)
- Driver dia.: 42.5 in (1.080 m)
- Length: 52 ft 1 1/2 in (15.89 m)
- Adhesive weight: 31 long tons 14 cwt (71,000 lb or 32.2 t); 31 long tons 14 hundredweight (32.2 t; 35.5 short tons)
- Tender weight: 25 long tons 10 cwt (57,100 lb or 25.9 t); 25 long tons 10 hundredweight (25.9 t; 28.6 short tons)
- Total weight: 68 long tons 10 cwt (153,400 lb or 69.6 t); 68 long tons 10 hundredweight (69.6 t; 76.7 short tons)
- Fuel type: Coal
- Fuel capacity: 4 long tons 0 cwt (9,000 lb or 4.1 t); 4 long tons 0 hundredweight (4.1 t; 4.5 short tons)
- Water cap.: 1,700 imperial gallons (7,700 L; 2,000 US gal)
- Firebox
  - Grate area: 17.3 sq ft (1.61 m^{2}); 26.4 sq ft (2.45 m^{2}) Rebuilt
- Boiler pressure: 175 lbf/in^{2} (1.21 MPa); 200 lbf/in^{2} (1.38 MPa) Rebuilt
- Heating surface: 1,037 sq ft (96.3 m^{2}); 768 sq ft (71.3 m^{2}) Rebuilt
- Cylinders: Two, outside
- Cylinder size: 16 in × 22 in (406 mm × 559 mm)
Performance figures
- Tractive effort: 18,550 lbf (82.5 kN); 21,200 lbf (94 kN) Rebuilt
Career
- Operators: NZGR
- Number in class: 10
- Numbers: 178, 198, 302–309
- Withdrawn: 1960–1967
- Disposition: 10(all) scrapped

The NZR B class of 1899 was a class of steam locomotives that operated on New Zealand's national rail network. An earlier B class of Double Fairlies had entered service in 1874, but as they had departed from the ownership of the New Zealand Railways (NZR) by the end of 1896, the B classification was free to be re-used. Despite early difficulties, they were amongst NZR's most influential designs.

== Construction ==
The B class was designed as a larger, more powerful locomotive to handle mainline freight trains that were becoming too heavy for locomotives of the O, P, and T classes. The first was built in NZR's own Addington Workshops in Christchurch and entered service on 4 May 1899, and an order was placed with Sharp, Stewart and Company of Glasgow, Scotland to supply four more. The first engine from Scotland entered service on 20 December 1899, followed by the other three within the next month.

Over the course of 1901–1903, five more Bs were built in Addington Workshops, with the last entering service in May 1903. The locomotives were advanced for their time, featuring a new piston valve design and a modified form of Walschaerts valve gear, and they were designed to haul 600-long-ton (610 t; 670-short-ton) freight trains on flat lines and 220 long tons (224 t; 246 short tons) on the hilly section of the Main South Line between Oamaru and Dunedin. For the time, these were quite significant figures. The Addington engines were unusual in the fact that they employed a screw reverse configuration, instead of the standard reversing lever. They also had fold-down seats for both driver and fireman.

Only a couple of years after their arrival in New Zealand, three of the four Sharp, Stewart models entered NZR's Addington and Hillside (Dunedin) Workshops to be rebuilt, emerging as the W^{E} class 4-6-4T tank locomotives.

== Operation and improvement ==
The first locomotives had 13 ft 6 in (4.11 m) coupled wheelbase, which combined with a stiff frame caused track damage. The frames flexibility was improved by removing the continuous running plates and replacing them with boiler mounted boards. These were unsuited to the standard NZR sandbox of the time and so the engines were given sand domes. The last three had a 12 ft 6 in (3.81 m) wheelbase.

In their early years, the B class hauled freight trains between Christchurch and Dunedin, with their pulling power a considerable asset. However, they did not last long on this task. In 1906, the A class was introduced, followed by the ubiquitous A^{B} class in 1915, thus displacing the B class locomotives to branch lines where their low axle loading was a benefit.

In the early nineteen-twenties, five were given superheated boilers. Starting in 1929 some of the class were reboilered with wide fireboxes. The first to be upgraded was B 306, re-entering service in March 1930. The overhaul involved the installation of wider fireboxes and superheated boilers, increasing the boiler pressure to 200 psi (1,400 kPa) and generating a tractive effort of 21,200 lbf (94,000 N). B 304 was similarly overhauled in 1931 and B 307 followed in 1935, and then a considerable length of time elapsed until B 303 in 1948 became the fourth and last to be upgraded. As rebuilt they were rated for 700 long tons (710 t; 780 short tons) on the level and 280 long tons (280 t; 310 short tons) on the 2.2 percent (1 in 45) over the Reefton Saddle.

About the same time, these modifications were being carried out, NZR began extending the lives of specialised goods locomotives by adapting them for heavy shunting work. This included the provision of a second sand dome and a tender cab. Some tenders were cut down to improve rearward visibility. The resulting mix of boiler and tender combinations meant the class had a far from the standard appearance in later years.

The locomotives were always based in the South Island. In early years they averaged 24,000 miles (39,000 km) per year working in Canterbury and Otago. By the 1950s, with most working on the West Coast, they were still averaging 20,000 miles, making the class one of the most consistent performers for NZR.

== Withdrawal ==
All members of the B class, including the three converted into W^{E} tanks, survived until the last decade of steam in New Zealand in the 1960s, with the country's last regular steam-hauled service running on 26 October 1971. B 302 barely made it into the 1960s, becoming the first of the class to be withdrawn on 2 December 1960. B 306 followed the next year, and by the start of 1967, only two Bs were in operation. They were retired in December of that year. The last W^{E} was taken out of service in March 1969.

No members of either B or W^{E} classes survived to be preserved, despite the fact they survived into the era of preservation societies. The last known example, low-boilered B 302, had been dumped near Brunner in December 1960 after colliding with A^{B} 818. Although heavily damaged, the locomotive was still largely intact until 1970, when the A 428 Preservation Society travelled to Brunner and cut the locomotive up for scrap as part of a fundraising drive to save A 428 for preservation.

== Similar locomotives ==
Three similar classes of locomotives operated on NZR, and they accordingly received similar classifications: B^{A}, B^{B}, and B^{C}. Like the B class, the B^{A} and B^{B} classes had a wheel arrangement of 4-8-0, but the solitary member of the B^{C} class was a 2-8-2 locomotive.

The Western Australian Government Railways (WAGR) F class was an enlarged version of the B class. A total of 57 of them were built, and two have been preserved.

== See also ==
- NZR B^{A} class
- NZR B^{B} class
- NZR B^{C} class
- Locomotives of New Zealand
