= A&G Price =

Engineering company in Thames, New Zealand

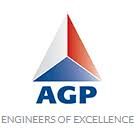
- Industry: Heavy engineering
- Founded: 1868
- Founder: Alfred Price; George Price
- Headquarters: Auckland, New Zealand
- Products: locomotives and rolling stock; ships and ship repair; steel and non-ferrous foundry; general engineers
- Owner: Christopher Reeve
- Website: www.agprice.co.nz

A&G Price Limited is an engineering firm and locomotive manufacturer in Thames, New Zealand, founded in 1868.

== History ==
A&G Price was established in 1868 in Princes Street, Onehunga by Alfred Price and George Price, two brothers from Stroud, Gloucestershire. They built almost 100 flax-milling machines in their first year. The brothers also built machinery for gold miners. They moved to the Coromandel Gold Rushes in 1871 setting up premises in Beach Road, Thames and closing the Onehunga works in 1873 after building 10 coaches and 12 trucks there for the Public Works Department. The firm's ownership was transferred to a limited liability company in 1907.

=== Ownership ===
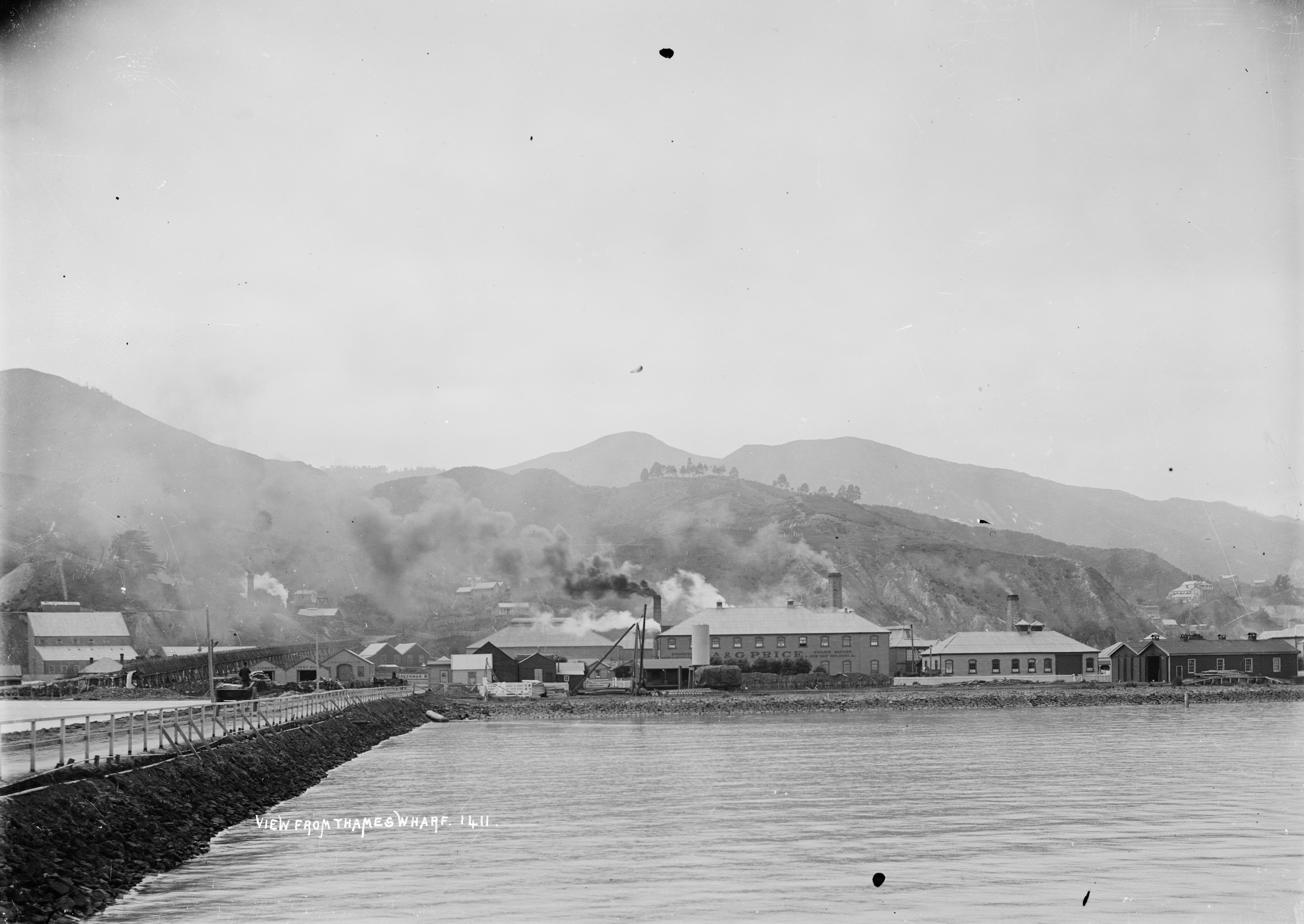
A&G Price, Thames, early 1900s

A&G Price Limited remained under family management until November 1949 when it was bought by Wellington engineers, William Cable & Company. The two companies then exchanged board members but kept their separate identities. Cable bought Downer & Co in 1954 and in 1964 William Cable Holdings was renamed Cable, Price, Downer Limited.

In 1974 the staff of A&G Price alone was in excess of 520 people. Its head office was in Fanshawe Street, Auckland. Beach Road Thames was described as a branch. In 1988 corporate raider Brierley Investments obtained control of the group parent, Cable Price Downer, and broke the group back into its three separate businesses. A&G Price, Beach Road, Thames, was until liquidation part of the Tiri Group, based in Mount Wellington and controlled from Nelson by Tom Sturgess.

In July 2017, A&G Price was placed in administration with the loss of 100 jobs. The business was bought from the administrator by Christopher Reeve in April 2018. Reeve had been unable to sell the land and buildings. The business now operates with a reduced workforce under Reeve's ownership.

== Products ==
A&G Price produced water turbines under the Pelton patent. Lester Allan Pelton invented and a highly efficient turbine patenting it in 1880. Initially, Pelton manufactured and sold the turbines to gold mine operators in the California goldfields, and later licensed the manufacturing to companies across the world. A small A&G Price turbine is on display at the Goldmine Experience in Thames, New Zealand.

Abner Doble helped A&G Price develop a steam engine for buses at the Thames workshops. The first engine was trialled by the Auckland Transport Board in the early 1930s. A second bus was made in 1932 for White and Sons for the Auckland Thames route.

In 2004 a precision-formed yacht keel division was set up to make the Maximus canting keel.

== A&G Price and railways ==
A&G Price was the largest private New Zealand railway locomotive manufacturer, both in terms of output and in terms of supply of rolling stock to the New Zealand Government Railways (NZGR or NZR) and other firms, mainly Bush tramways used for logging timber.

Price manufactured 22 carriages and wagons in the early 1870s, and manufactured two locomotives in the 1880s for private industry, the first being a 0-4-0ST Saddle Tank type locomotive. The Thames Branch railway line opened in 1898, and Price won a tender to make locomotives for NZR in 1903 and 1906. Later in the 1950s and 1960s they manufactured a number of diesel shunting locomotives for the NZR, the T^{R} class, and some for private users.

In the 1920s several petrol tanks were built for NZR and in 1964 for Mobil. 400 LC class wagons were built in 1960.

In 1990 A&G Price regauged 24 of the 31 Silver Star carriages to metre gauge (1000 mm) for running in Malaysia, Singapore and Thailand as the Eastern & Oriental Express. Six carriages from this train were stored at Price's Thames workshop in case any extra carriage conversions were required, with the remaining carriages shipped to South East Asia but not refurbished. These carriages were later sold by the Eastern & Oriental Express to private owners in New Zealand.

=== Locomotive types built by A&G Price ===
- 1885 0-4-0ST type (1), 3 feet (910 mm) gauge, built originally for Waiorongomai Tramway, used 1886-1894 by Mander & Bradley at Pukekaroro, 1897-1908 by Messrs. Smyth Brothers' Tramway at Kennedy Bay, 1908 as PWD # 511 for railway construction Picton and Otira, and finally scrapped in 1917
- W^{F} (15)
- A (50)

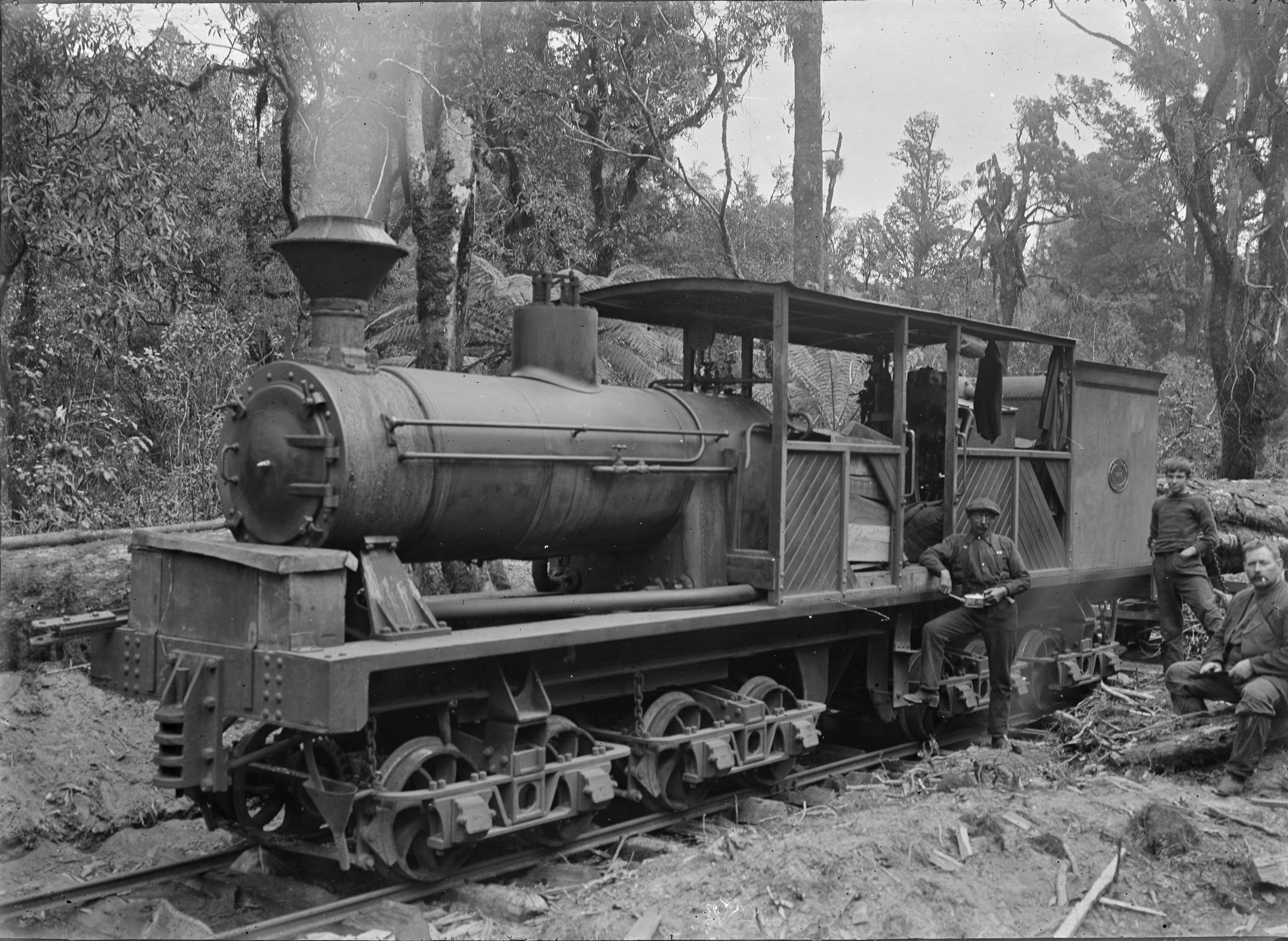
Price 16-wheeler

- 1912 16-wheeler 0-4-4-4-4-0T type (4), similar to the Johnston 16-wheeler
- 1912 Price C 0-4-4-0+T type (2), similar to the Climax A Type
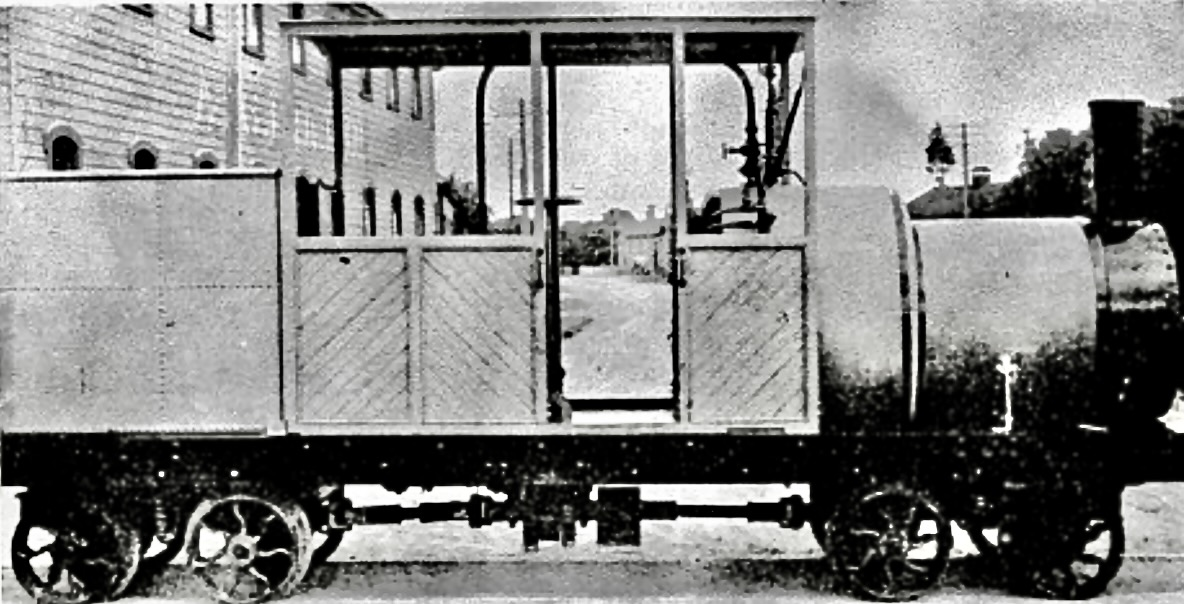
- A & G Price type D in 1922
  1912 Price D 0-4-4-0T type (1), a smaller lighter version of the Price C
- A^{B} (20)
- B^{B} (30)
- W^{AB} (8)
- 1923 Price E 0-4-4-0+T type (4), similar to the Climax B Type
- 1924 Price Ca 0-4-4-0+T type (1), a Price C but with Heisler style bogies
- 1924 0-4-0PM Fordson rail tractor, followed by similar TR type locos for NZR and PWD
- 1925 Price Cb 0-4-4-0+T type (4), an updated version of the Price C
- 1926 Price Ar 0-4-4-0+T type (1), a Meyer locomotive type
- 1927 Price Cba 0-4-4-0+T type (1), an improved development of the Ca and Cb types
- 1937 Price E 0-4-4-0+T type (1), an improved version of the previous E type
- 1939 Price Rail Tractor (10), a small petrol-mechanical design
- 1943 Price V 0-4-4-0+T type (1), the last Heisler built in the world for Ogilvie & Co at Gladstone, near Greymouth. Moved from there in 1965.
- 1951 Price Da 0-4-0 type (3), 2 ft (610 mm) gauge diesel mechanical design for Mines Department at Ohai coal mines
- early 1950s 5 diesel and 7 battery-electric 3-ft gauge for Rimutaka Tunnel construction
- Price Model 1 through Model 22, various diesel types, many of which were supplied to the NZR
- 1971 Price Rail Tractor (1), last locomotive constructed, for yard use at A&G Price. It used a Fordson Major E1 as its base.

=== Preserved locomotives ===
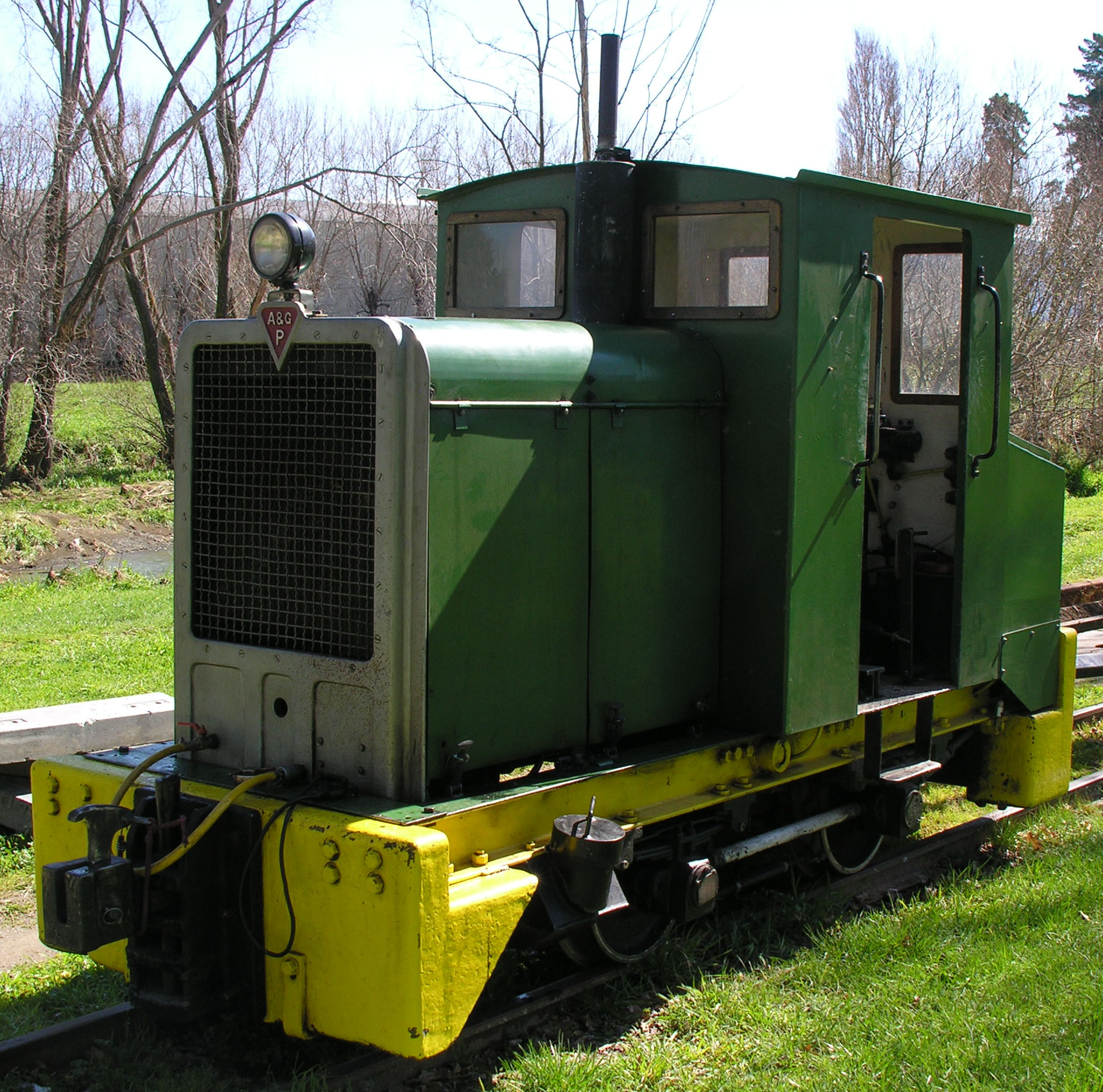
1951 built 2ft gauge Da type locomotive

- A 423 - Glenbrook Vintage Railway
- A 428 - Weka Pass Railway
- A^{B} 699 - Pleasant Point Railway
- B^{B} 144 - Mainline Steam
- C^{B} 108 - Tokomaru Steam Museum
- C^{B} 113 - Canterbury Railway Society
- C^{B} 117 - Bush Tramway Club
- C^{BA} 119 - Shantytown and Westland Heritage Park
- E 111 - Bush Tramway Club
- Price 149 - SteamRail Wanganui
- Price 150 - Steam Scene
- Price 151 - Goldfields Railway
- Price 152 - Ormondville Rail Preservation Society
- Price 166 and 168 - Blenheim Riverside Railway
- Price 184 - Bay of Islands Vintage Railway, named Freddie
- Price 185 - Ocean Beach Railway
- Price 198 (now T^{R} 119) - The Plains Railway
- Price 199 - Main Trunk Rail Ohakune
- Price 200 - Whangarei Steam & Model Railway Club
- Price 212 - SteamRail Wanganui
- Price 213 - Mainline Steam Heritage Trust
- Price 218 - Putaruru Timber Museum.
- Price 221 - Silver Stream Railway
- Price 222 - KiwiRail Now privately owned and in service at Waitara Railway Preservation Society
- Price shunter - DoC Kaueranga Valley
- Price Shunter - Bush Tramway Club
- T^{R} 38 - The Plains Railway
- T^{R} 103 (TR 344 TMS) - Morrinsville Kiwi Fertilizer (now on loan to the Rotorua Ngongotaha Railway Trust)
- T^{R} 105 (TR 367) TMS) - Bush Tramway Club
- T^{R} 107 (TR 396 TMS) - Shantytown
- T^{R} 108 (TR 407 TMS) - Waitara Railway Preservation Society
- T^{R} 111 (TR 442 TMS) - Taieri Gorge Railway
- T^{R} 110 (TR 436) TMS) - Bush Tramway Club
- T^{R} 112 (TR 459 TMS) - Bush Tramway Club
- T^{R} 113 (TR 465 TMS) - SteamRail Wanganui
- T^{R} 117 (TR 505 TMS) - Pahiatua Railcar Society
- T^{R} 118 (TR 511 TMS) - Waimea Plains Railway
- T^{R} 119 (formerly Price 198) - The Plains Railway
- T^{R} 160 (TR 632 TMS) - Pahiatua Railcar Society
- T^{R} 161 (TR 649 TMS) - Reefton Historic Trust Board
- T^{R} 163 (TR 661 TMS) - Bay of Islands Vintage Railway Named Timmy
- T^{R} 165 (TR 684 TMS) - Waitara Railway Preservation Society
- T^{R} 166 (TR 689 TMS) - Waitara Railway Preservation Society
- T^{R} 170 (TR 724 TMS) - Wairarapa Railway Restoration Society (Stored offsite)
- T^{R} 171 (TR 730 TMS) - Museum of Transport and Technology
- V 148 - Canterbury Steam Preservation Society
- W^{AB} 800 -Glenbrook Vintage Railway
- W^{F} 392 - boiler preserved at Don River Railway, Tasmania
- W^{F} 393 - Canterbury Railway Society
