= NZR BA class =

NZR B^{A} class
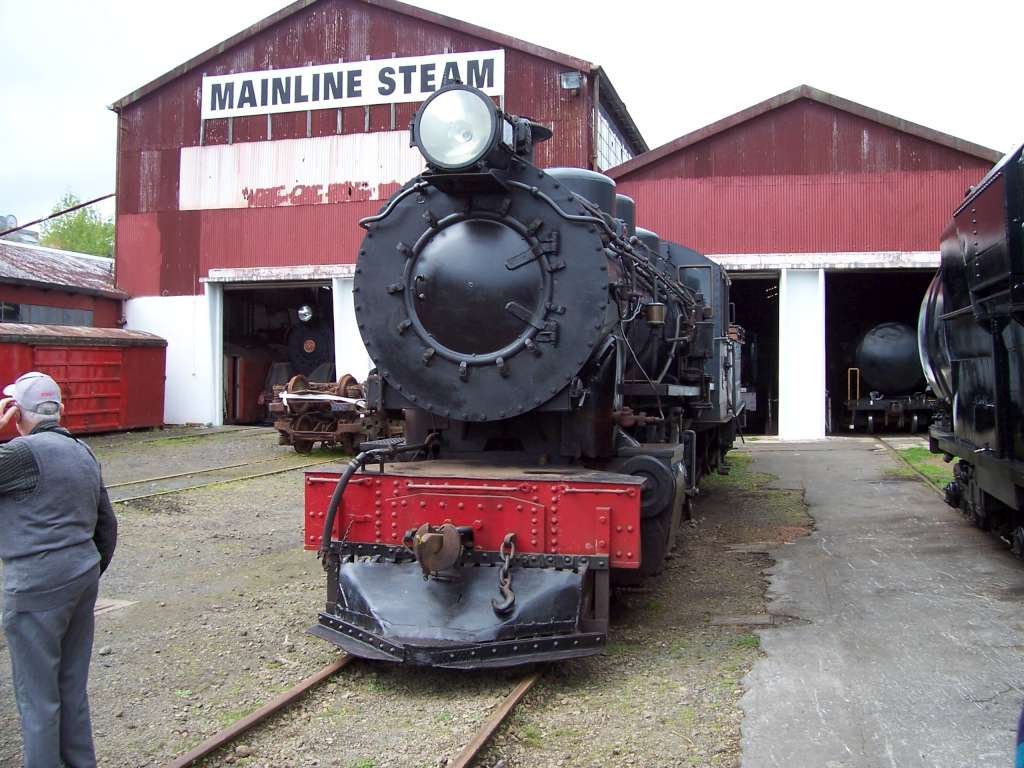
- B^{A} 552 at Mainline Steam's former Parnell depot in September 2010.
Type and origin
- Power type: Steam
- Builder: NZR Addington Workshops
- Build date: 1911 - 1913
Specifications
- Configuration
  - Whyte: 4-8-0
- Gauge: 3 ft 6 in (1,067 mm)
- Driver dia.: 42.5 in (1,080 mm)
- Length: 52 ft 3 in (15.93 m)
- Adhesive weight: 32.3 long tons (32.8 t)
- Loco weight: 43.9 long tons (44.6 t; 49.2 short tons)
- Tender weight: 25.5 long tons (25.9 t; 28.6 short tons)
- Total weight: 69.4 long tons (70.5 t; 77.7 short tons)
- Fuel type: Coal
- Fuel capacity: 4.0 long tons (4.1 t; 4.5 short tons)
- Water cap.: 1,700 imp gal (7,700 L; 2,000 US gal)
- Firebox
  - Grate area: 16.7 square feet (1.55 m^{2}) original 26.4 square feet (2.45 m^{2}) rebuild
- Boiler pressure: 175 psi (1,210 kPa) original 200 psi (1,400 kPa) rebuild
- Superheater
  - Heating area: 206 square feet (19.1 m^{2})
- Cylinders: Two
- Cylinder size: 16 in × 22 in (406 mm × 559 mm)
Performance figures
- Maximum speed: 30 mph (48 km/h)
- Tractive effort: 18,550 lbf (82,500 N) original 21,200 lbf (94,000 N) rebuild
Career
- Number in class: 10
- Numbers: 148, 497 - 500, 551 - 555
- Locale: Otago and Southland
- First run: November 1911
- Last run: June 1969
- Preserved: One (B^{A} 552)
- Disposition: One preserved, remainder scrapped

The B^{A} class was a class of steam locomotive built by the New Zealand Railways Department (NZR) for use on New Zealand's national railway network. The first B^{A} class entered service in November 1911, with the last of the 11 class members introduced on 14 May 1913.

== Construction and later enhancements ==
In design and appearance the B^{A} class was very similar to the B class of 1899–1903, but superheated and with a smaller firebox. They were designed primarily for use on freight trains in the South Island, and were capable of hauling a load of goods at speeds up to 30 mph (48 km/h).

In March 1928, B^{A} 552 was modified to have a wider firebox, and later that year the same work was done on B^{A} 498. It was almost two decades before the alterations were performed on any other members of the class: B^{A} 553 was done in May 1948, B^{A} 148 the next month, and fifth and last was B^{A} 499 in November 1949. The other B^{A} locomotives were left with unmodified fireboxes.

The upgraded engines were capable of producing more power: their boiler pressure was raised to 200 psi (1,379 kPa) and they could generate 21,200 lbf (94 kN). On straight, flat track, they could haul 700–750 long tons (784–840 short tons; 711–762 t), and on the arduous Mihiwaka Bank north of Dunedin they were capable of hauling 270 long tons (302 short tons; 274 t), 50 long tons (56 short tons; 51 t) more than the five locomotives that were not upgraded.

Like many classes of specialised freight engines on NZR, eight of the ten B^{A} locomotives were modified to perform shunting duties. This included an all-weather cab fixture on the tender to provide shelter for crews, and second sand domes.

== Operation ==
The locomotives occasionally hauled suburban passenger trains in Dunedin, but were primarily freight locomotives. They operated in Otago and Southland on the Main South Line and the many branch lines that fanned from it in the first half of the 20th century. The enhanced locomotives with larger fireboxes were often seen on the Otago Central Railway.

With the arrival of more powerful mixed traffic engines in from the 1920s' onward, the B^{A} class were largely confined to heavy shunting duties and short-haul freight services in and around Dunedin. One main line duty retained by the class for some years was the Makareao Limestone trains. Some members of the class were transferred in the 1950s to the West Coast, where they operated for a few years on both shunting and longer distance services, notably on the line to Westport.

== Withdrawal and preservation ==
The B^{A} class lasted into the 1960s, late in the days of steam. The first B^{A} to exit service was B^{A} 554 in May 1963, and through the mid-1960s, the class was progressively withdrawn. At the start of 1969, only one was left in service, B^{A} 552.

B^{A} 552 hauled railfan excursions in the mid-1960s, and in 1968 and into 1969 it was retained by NZR on standby, should extra motive power be required. In June 1969 the decision was made to withdraw the locomotive, and pressure came from railfans to retain it for preservation. Les Hostick purchased it and it was used to haul an excursion in November of that year, and in September 1970 it was transferred to the North Island, in the process becoming the only member of the B^{A} class to leave the South Island. Although steam had technically ceased in the North Island, B^{A} 552 and A 423 were used on a steam delivery trip between Palmerston North and Frankton, with B^{A} 552 leading for much of the journey. It was later put on display at the New Zealand Railway and Locomotive Society's Te Awamutu base, where it was held in on static display. In 1994 it was leased to Ian Welch of the Mainline Steam Heritage Trust. It has been restored and is in full running order, capable of hauling mainline excursion trains. It is currently undergoing a 10-year overhaul.

== See also ==
- NZR B class (1899)
- NZR B^{B} class
- NZR B^{C} class
- Locomotives of New Zealand
