= NZR G class (1928) =

Type of Garratt locomotives used in New Zealand

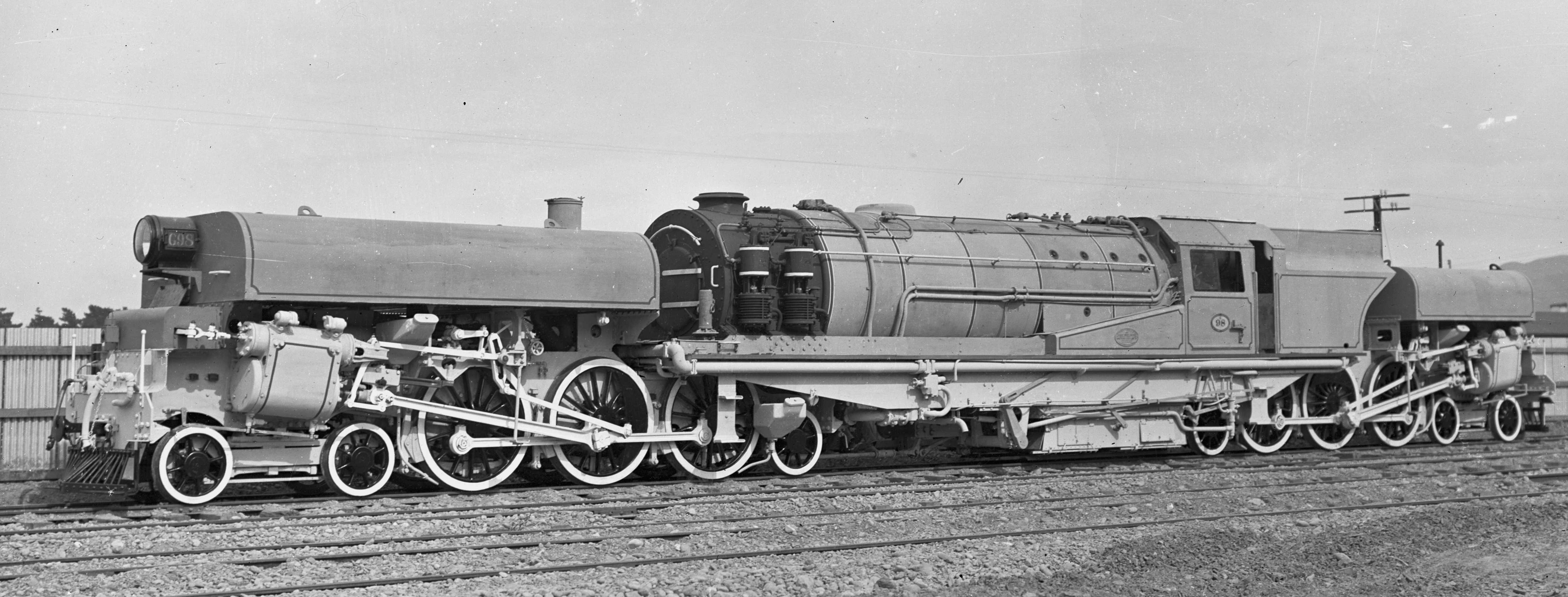
- A G class locomotive in Garratt form.
Type and origin
- Power type: Steam
- Builder: Beyer, Peacock & Company
- Serial number: 6484–6486
- Build date: 1928
- Total produced: 6
Specifications
- Configuration
  - Whyte: Garratt: 4-6-2+2-6-4
- Driver dia.: 57 in (1.448 m)
- Length: 84 ft 3.75 in (25.70 m)
- Width: 8 ft 6 in (2.59 m)
- Height: 11 ft 6 in (3.51 m)
- Adhesive weight: 87.7 long tons (98.2 short tons; 89.1 t)
- Loco weight: 146.8 long tons (164.4 short tons; 149.2 t)
- Firebox
  - Grate area: 58.2 sq ft (5.41 m^{2})
- Boiler pressure: 200 psi (1.4 MPa)
- Heating surface: 2,223 sq ft (206.5 m^{2})
- Cylinders: 6
- Cylinder size: 16.5 in × 24 in (419 mm × 610 mm)
Performance figures
- Tractive effort: 51,580 lbf (229.44 kN)
Career
- Operators: New Zealand Government Railways
- Number in class: 3
- Numbers: 98–100
- First run: 1928
- Last run: 1931
- Preserved: 0
- Disposition: Withdrawn

NZR G class (1937)
Type and origin
- Builder: Hillside Workshops
- Build date: 1937
- Total produced: 3
Specifications
- Configuration
  - Whyte: 4-6-2
- Driver dia.: 57 in (1.448 m)
- Total weight: 99.5 long tons (111.4 short tons; 101.1 t)
- Firebox
  - Grate area: 36.5 sq ft (3.39 m^{2})
- Boiler pressure: 180 psi (1.2 MPa)
- Heating surface: 1,175 sq ft (109.2 m^{2})
- Cylinders: 3
- Cylinder size: 16.5 in × 24 in (419 mm × 610 mm)
Performance figures
- Tractive effort: 25,800 lbf (114.76 kN)
Career
- Number in class: 6
- Numbers: 95–100
- Last run: 1956

The NZR G class was a type of Garratt locomotives used in New Zealand, later rebuilt as Pacific type locomotives. They were the only Garratt type steam locomotives ever used by the New Zealand Railways (NZR). They were ordered to deal with traffic growth over the heavy gradients of the North Island Main Trunk (NIMT) and to do away with the use of banking engines on steep grades. They were one of the few Garratt designs to employ six cylinders. A mechanical stoker was used to feed coal into the locomotive. The locomotives lasted longer in rebuilt form as standard Pacific locomotives than they did as Garratts, but their numerous mechanical issues lead to their final withdrawal following a union ban on their use in 1956.

== Introduction ==
About 1913, the General Manager E. H. Hiley considered the importing of ten articulated Garratt engines and ten Pacifics. With the success of the A^{B} class and W^{AB} class Pacifics no more was heard of Garratts. Then with the retirement in 1925 of the Chief Mechanical Engineer E E Gillon his successor G S Lynde invited Beyer, Peacock & Company of England to suggest a suitable Garrett for the NIMT, and they were then asked to quote for engines with either four or six cylinders. But the three six-cylinder engines were supplied "against their own better judgement. The influence of the London & North Eastern Railway three-cylinder enthusiasts (i.e. Lynde) was evident in this unwise decision." These engines had three cylinders (16.5-by-24-inch or 419-by-610-millimetre) on each of the two set of engine frames, thus creating a 6-cylinder Garratt. The engines entered service in 1929.

Walschaerts valve gear operated the outside cylinders with the inner third cylinder operated by a Gresley-Holcroft mechanism. The locomotives proved a disaster on the light NZR tracks. It has been suggested the most likely reason was that the engines were too powerful for the system and also the valve gear mechanisms were complicated. The design was most unusual in that the coal bunker was carried on an extension to the boiler frame rather than the normal Garratt positioning on the rear engine's frame. Unlike a Union Garratt the rear water tank was still mounted on the rear engine unit.

The engines operated at 200 psi (1,400 kPa) and delivered 51,580 lb (23,400 kg) of tractive effort which, on the lightly laid New Zealand tracks, proved to be too powerful for the drawbars on rolling stock and broken drawbars occurred wherever the engines ran. Further, the locomotives when hauling a full load, generated such intense heat in restricted tunnels, which are common in New Zealand, that crews disliked working them. Their large size driving wheels also made them unsuitable for the NIMT.

The G class were mostly based at Ohakune and operated between Taihape and Ohakune on the NIMT. The central section of the NIMT of 93 miles (153 km) from Taumarunui to Taihape had been relaid with heavier 70 lb/yd (34.8 kg/m) rather than 53 lb/yd (26.3 kg/m) rails in 1901 for the introduction of the heavier NZR X class locomotives.

== Withdrawal ==
Trainloads were reduced and this defeated the purpose for which the Garratts were purchased – namely to operate heavy loads over a vital mainline section of the NIMT route, the central section including the Raurimu Spiral. The trailing engine axle under the cab carried a heavier load than the leading engine trailing axle and experienced continual problems with overheating. Also, the coal bunker carried insufficient fuel in-service and this problem was never remedied because it would have increased the axle loads beyond the light track capabilities.

One engine (G 99) was withdrawn from service in 1935, with G 98 and G 100 following in early 1936. Their numerous design faults sealed the fate of these locomotives when the K class was introduced in 1932.

== Rebuilding as Pacifics ==
Due to the troubles faced with the Garratts in their original form, a proposal was put forward in late 1935 for the three Garratts to be dismantled and the engine units used to build six new 4-6-2 tender locomotives. The three locomotives were dismantled at Hutt Workshops in 1936 and the engine units shipped to Hillside Workshops in Dunedin for eventual rebuilding. The engines as rebuilt were fitted with a new third cylinder, a modified A^{B} class boiler, a new cab and trailing truck based on those used on the Baldwin A^{A} class, and a new Vanderbilt tender based on those used on the A^{B} class, but of welded construction and fitted with roller bearing bogies. The original plate frames were retained as was the Gresley conjugated valve gear.

=== In service ===
The first rebuilt locomotive, G 96, was outshopped on 8 September 1937 and dispatched north after initial tests to Christchurch for use on the Midland line. Some minor adjustments were required although the performance of the initial rebuild was deemed satisfactory and the other five engine units were subsequently rebuilt with the last locomotive, G 100, outshopped on 4 March 1938. The rebuilt locomotives were largely used between the Arthur's Pass and Christchurch section of the Midland line on heavy coal haulage during the Second World War and the immediate post-war years. The G class worked alongside the six K^{B} class locomotives and were able to move tonnage which would have required fourteen J class or J^{A} class locomotives. Only 9 trains in each direction could be run, each way, through the steep 45 miles (72 km) section from Arthur's Pass to Springfield, six regular freight, an extra run as required freight in both directions, the West Coast express three times a week and the overnight perishables mixed train 205/220. The express and perishables were hauled by A^{B} class locomotives, and the remaining freight trains usually by K^{B} class and one or two G class, or sometimes up to three G class. While difficult engines disliked by engine crews, the G class moved huge tonnage in these hard vital years, running more mileage, at lower operating costs than the A or A^{A} classes and in ton-miles were outperformed only by the J, J^{A}, A^{B} and K^{A}.

After the introduction in 1939 of the new K^{B} class both the G class and the K^{B} class were trialled on the South Island Limited and mail express on the Main South Line, during the Second World War as far south as Timaru and sometimes Oamaru and Dunedin, once certain bridges had been strengthened to accept the 14-ton axle loading of the rebuilt G and K^{B} class locomotives. The G class, after their first full A grade overhaul in late 1941, were prepared and tuned for the trial on the summer SIMT expresses, part of the rebuilt G class purpose being an assessment of a planned new class of larger 3-cylinder Pacifics for SIMT fast express services. The G class were cleared to operate all traffic classes on the Christchurch-Timaru section, including express trains on 1 December 1941. Over the summer with wartime peak traffic, increased by the entry of the United States into the Pacific War on 7 December 1941, the G class were driven "excessively hard" on the South Express and West Coast express trains, until major failure on northbound train 174, the South Island Express to Christchurch on 16 January 1942 saw their use terminated on passenger express service.

The route of the South Island expresses between Christchurch and Timaru was fast but with few stops, with restarts downhill on 1/100 grades. The northbound SIMT express trains faced a largely uphill, fast run over the 160km from Timaru to Christchurch, with difficult, uphill 1/100 grade, starts from Plains stops with heavy wartime loads, often 14 carriages, out of passenger and mail halts at Temuka, Winchester, Orari, Hinds, Ashburton, Rakaia and Burnham.

Often running late to make up time for fixed schedules for the overnight steamer express from Lyttelton. Faster running than the timetable of 2 hours 54 minutes (express) and 3 hours 15 minutes (mail) timetable to Christchurch, were beyond the G class and possibly impossible for any class as NZR CME Angus often pointed out in relation to expectations of the G class, only once did a G manage the return leg of the express run back to Christchurch without major delays or failure. Tests proved the G and K^{B} with their high axle loads, unique complexities as booster or three-cylinder systems, more efficiently deployed moving heavy coal trains on the Midland line.

The G class could often not generate enough steam to build up speed for timekeeping, due to steam leaks around the cylinders and flexing frame being too light, prone to valve and motion link failure, the cylinder blocks should have been held by 1.5-inch plates as in the K^{A} class locomotive rather 0.75 plates, and the link guidances were fragile, thin and insufficient in number. The K^{A} tenders specified by the class designer, NZR Chief Mechanical Engineer, Angus would have had the same 14-ton axle load as the G locomotive. To save 2,000 pounds of weight on each G class locomotive, improved lighter A^{B} tenders were fitted with only 9.75-ton axle loads. The tenders were completely inadequate for water and coal requirements for fast 160 km, NZR runs leading to time loss due to extra refuelling stops.

After their first A grade overhaul in 1941, the G class were only leakproof for top link express service for the first 4000 miles, and each locomotive was only used for 120 days in 1941-42 to allow their express trial to be in top link condition which was only possible for each G locomotive for approximately, 20 return runs Christchurch-Arthur's Pass or Christchurch to Timaru.

While the G class were partly redesigned with express work in mind, they were incapable of the sustained 60-65 mph running on the 160 km northbound Timaru-Christchurch run, recovering time on heavy fast expresses over the Canterbury plains. As a result, no G class were used on express passenger trains from 1942 onwards. The G class continued to be used on regular Christchurch-Timaru express freight and stopping freight services until 1955, and were often employed on regional stopping passenger trains, such as Christchurch - Burnham and Christchurch- Springfield trains.

Although powerful, the G class had a low adhesive factor and had issues, notably with steam blows created by excessive movement of the thin plate frames. The steam leaks were of particular concern to the Engine drivers, Firemen and Cleaners' Association (EFCA), as was the lack of power-reversing gear, the latter being remedied in 1941 when Ragonnet power-reversing gear was installed. Although said to run well if kept in good repair, the G class were highly unpopular and the EFCA resolved that the class could not be used in regular service after 31 March 1956 due to visibility concerns created by the steam blows.

=== Withdrawal ===
In 1954, with the locomotives requiring substantial work, and complaints from the EFCA mounting, NZR decided to stop overhauls of the locomotives.

The decision was made to retire the now badly worn-out G-class locomotives after reaching a certain mileage. Both G 96 and G 97 were withdrawn in November 1955, as having reached their allotted mileage. The EFCA then placed a ban on operating the G-class locomotives in March 1956. As a result, the remaining four locomotives remained in service, but they saw little use until the end of May 1956, when they were officially withdrawn. Despite their deteriorating condition, owing to the lack of available replacement locomotives, the G class did see some further use, with the final service hauled by G 100 operating on 10 May 1956. By 31 March 1957, it was reported that the G class had been supplanted by five J^{A} class locomotives reallocated from Otago to make up for their withdrawal.

The locomotives were then stored on "rotten row" at Linwood locomotive depot. The G class locomotives were not scrapped straight away, but remained at Linwood locomotive depot in Christchurch until the early 1960s when they were broken up for scrap. Three of their tenders were used for W^{AB} class tank locomotives being converted to A^{B} class tender locomotives, with the other three G class tenders being used for A^{B} class locomotives. Other components, such as the steam injectors, were also removed from the locomotives for reuse on other locomotives. Boilers from the locomotives were reused as stationary boilers for generating steam, the last being in use at Whanganui's Easttown Workshops in the 1980s. One of these boilers was acquired by Tony Batchelor and transferred to the Mainline Steam Heritage Trust's Parnell, Auckland depot as a spare for A^{B} 663. It was later scrapped in 2018 when the Trust relocated from the Parnell depot.

Table of withdrawals
Year	Quantity in service at start of year	Quantity withdrawn	Locomotive numbers	Notes
1937	3	3	98, 99, 100.	
1938	0	-6	95, 96, 97, 98, 99, 100.	Returned to service as 4-6-2 rebuilds.
1956	6	6	95, 96, 97, 98, 99, 100.	

== See also ==
- NZR Q class (1901)
- NZR A/A^{D} class (1906)
- NZR A^{A} class
- NZR A^{B} class
- Locomotives of New Zealand
