= Piako County Tramway =

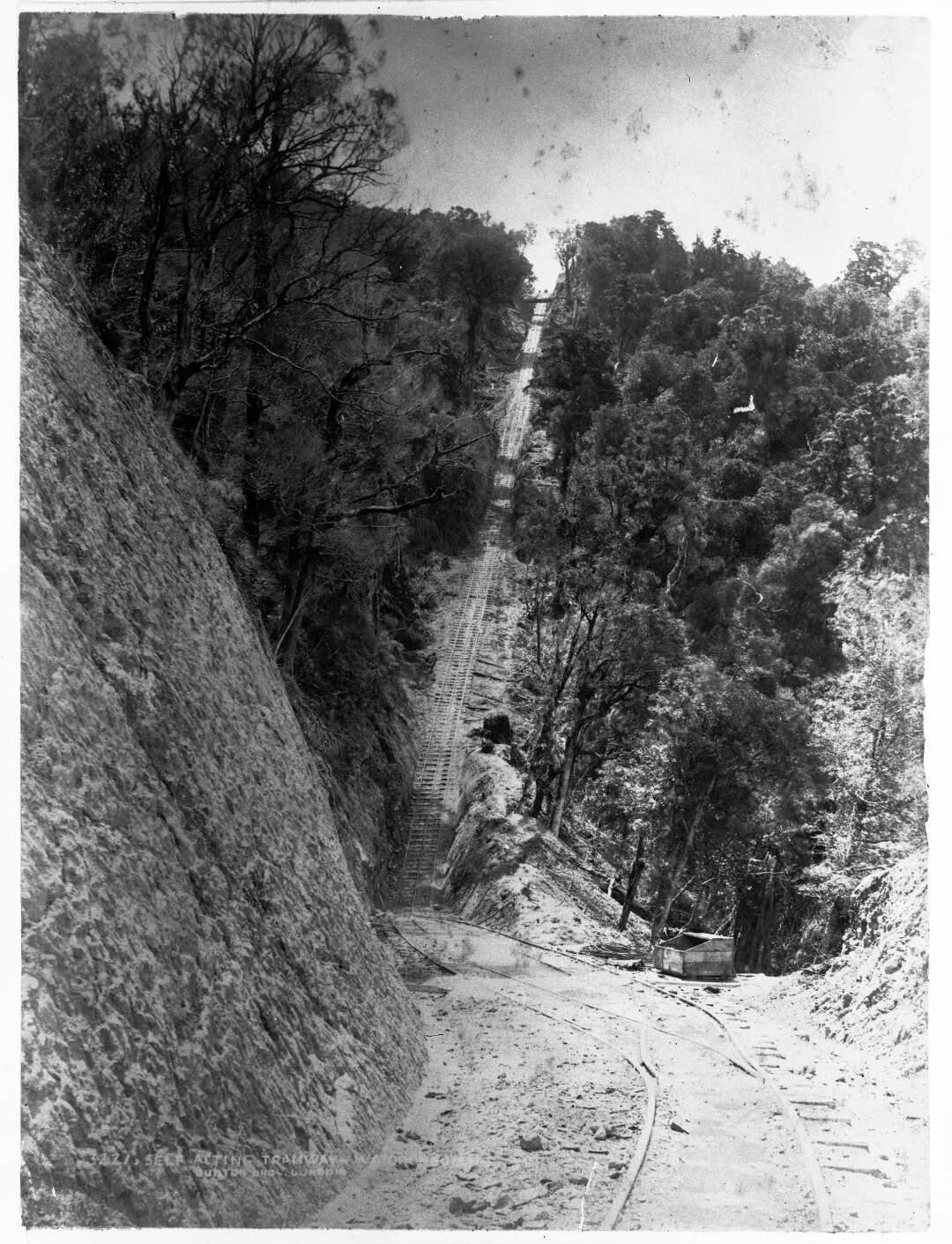
- Butler’s Spur Incline, Piako County Tramway. The maximum gradient was 1 in 2.

History
- Opened: 1884
- Closed: after 1924

Technical
- Track length: 3.7 km (2.3 mi)
- Track gauge: 2 ft 9 in (838 mm)
- Highest elevation: 430 m (1,410 ft)

The Piako County Tramway was built in 1882–83, just south of Te Aroha. It was a 2 mi 22 ch (3.7 km) long, horse powered tramway. It carried quartz from gold mines in the Kaimai Range to water-powered batteries in the Waiorongomai Stream valley below.

It was built to the rare 2 ft 9 in (838 mm) gauge, thought to be that used on bush tramways in the Waitawheta and neighbouring valleys.

A & G Price's first locomotive was built for the line, but proved too large for the curves and was sold for less than half its cost in 1885. It was later used for log haulage on Smyth Bros tramway at Kennedy's Bay.

The line included 3 self acting inclines, the longest being 400 m (1,300 ft) up a 1 in 4 gradient.

Repairs ceased in 1924 and by 1932 the line was overgrown and unusable.

During the 1950s and 1960s, some rails were sold to local contractors, but in 1966 permission to remove rails was refused and in 1976, council scheduled the tramway as of historical and scientific interest. The tramway was listed as Category 1 in 1997.

DOC has restored parts of the tramway, now used by Waiorongomai Valley tramping tracks.

== Waiorongomai ==
Waiorongomai is a locality at the foothills of the Kaimais. Originally Waiorongomai was a small town but the decline of the mines and works led to the gradual decline of the town with some buildings and settlers moving to Te Aroha; by 1959 only a few houses remained.

In 1883 the town had a post office, 3 hotels, and a public school and a population of 3,000–4,000. By 1902 the town had already declined with only one hotel remaining. In 1906 it had a population of 131. Mining operations finished in 1946. In 1959 only a few houses remained. Today all that remains of the settlement is a lone chimney.

== Quartzville ==
Quartzville was a small settlement near the top of the tramway, which had shops and a post office in the 1880s. The post office closed in 1890.

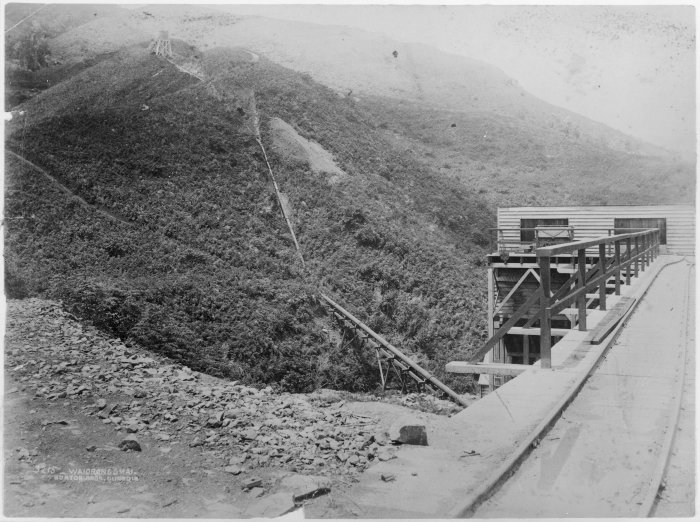
Water race and tram terminus at the Waiorongomai public gold battery, with the tram terminus in the right foreground. pre 1898.
