= Messrs. Smyth Brothers' Tramway =

Forest railway in New Zealand

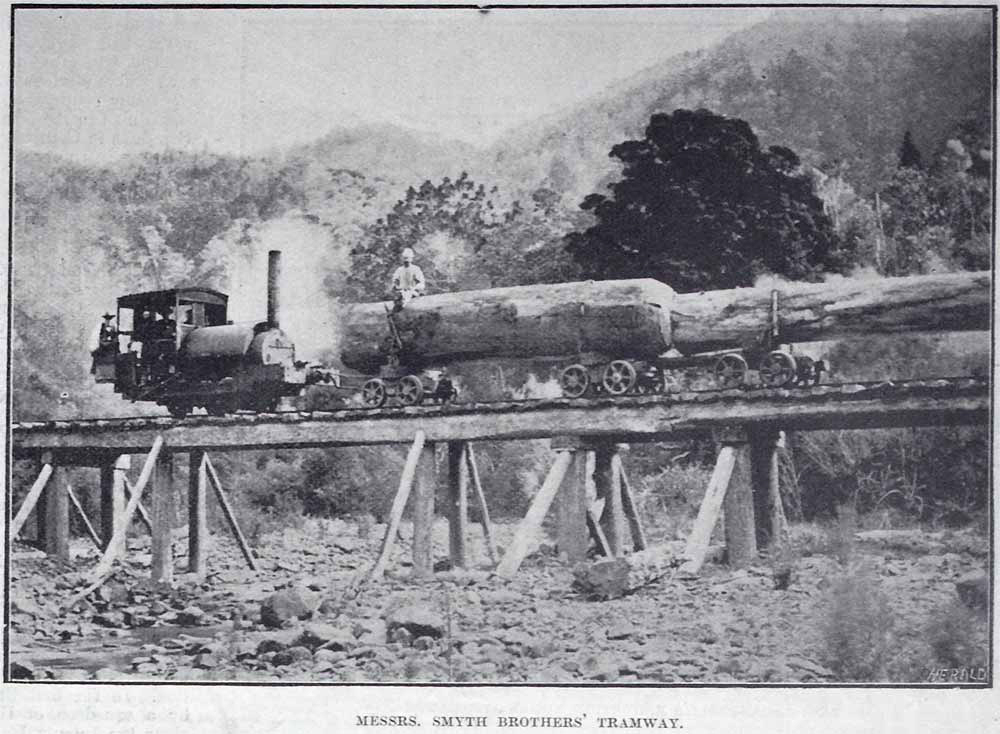
- Messrs. Smyth Brothers' Tramway

Technical
- Track gauge: 3 ft (914 mm)

Messrs. Smyth Brothers' Tramway was from 1897 to 1908 a bush tramway in New Zealand.

== Operation ==
Smyth Bros. owned around 1900 a logging operation using a steam tramway at Kennedy's Bay on the north-east coast of the Coromandel Peninsula, a few miles north of Mercury Bay.

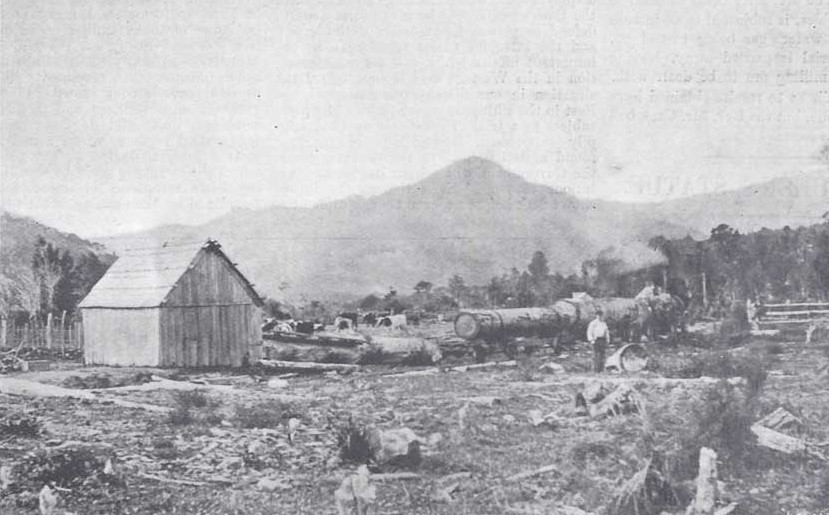
A timber clearing, 1898

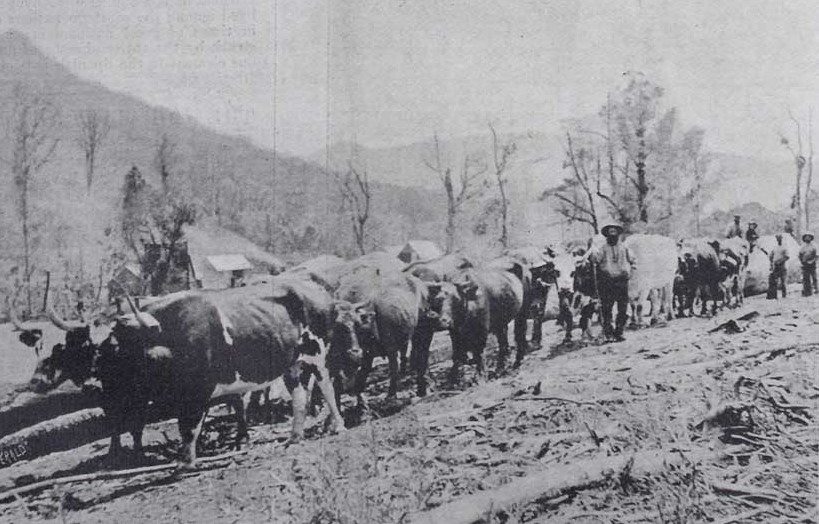
A fine bullock team, 1898

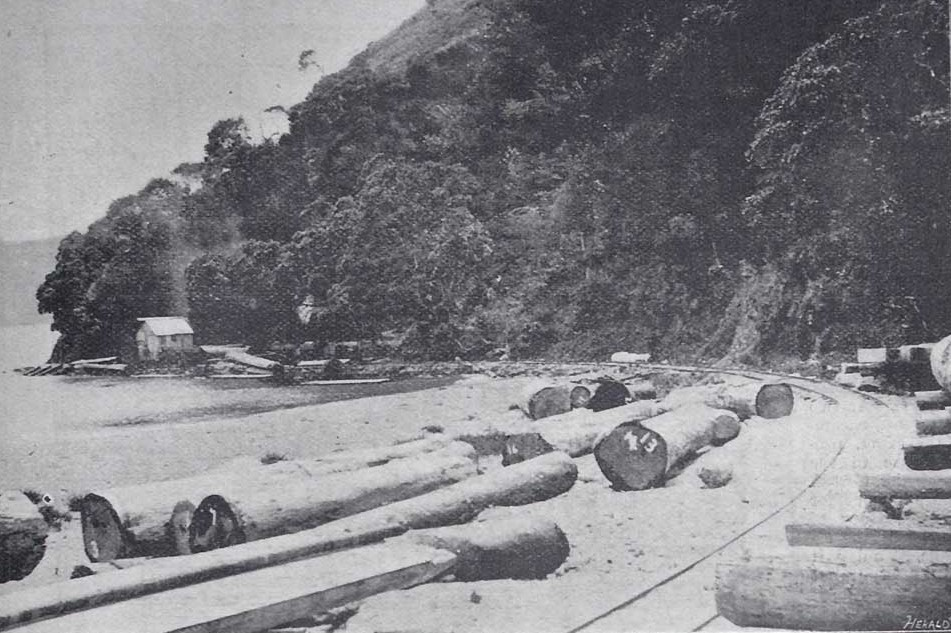
Kauri logs ready for shipment to the mill

== Locomotive ==
The 0-4-0ST saddle tank steam locomotive was the first locomotive built in 1885 by A & G Price of Thames. It was a geared locomotive with two cylinders arranged horizontally which drove the axles through spur gears. It had originally been ordered by civil engineer James Stewart to be used on the Waiorongomai or Piako County Tramway, but the deal fell through. The locomotive was instead used from 1886 to 1894 by Mander & Bradley in Pukekaroro. Smyth Brothers tendered subsequently successfully for the locomotive and used it from 1897 to 1908 at Kennedy Bay, before it was sold in 1908 to the governmental Public Works Department as PWD # 511 for railway construction at Picton and Otira, and finally scrapped in 1917.

== Gold Rush ==
Gold has been frequently found at Kennedy's Bay. In 1904, Smyth Bros. found gold in one of their driving streams, Omoho Creek, exposed by the action of the floating kauri logs about 4 miles north of the Royal Oak Mine. By driving timber down the Omoho Creek towards Kennedy Bay the creek channel had been scoured clean, thus revealing many fine reefs and leaders. The leader discovered crossed the creek in north-southerly direction. Strong gold was visible in the stone for over 30 feet (9.1 m), the size of the reef being up to 6 inches (15 cm) in thickness, so that an experienced prospector was contracted to retrieve the gold.
