= NZR AA class =

NZR A^{A} class
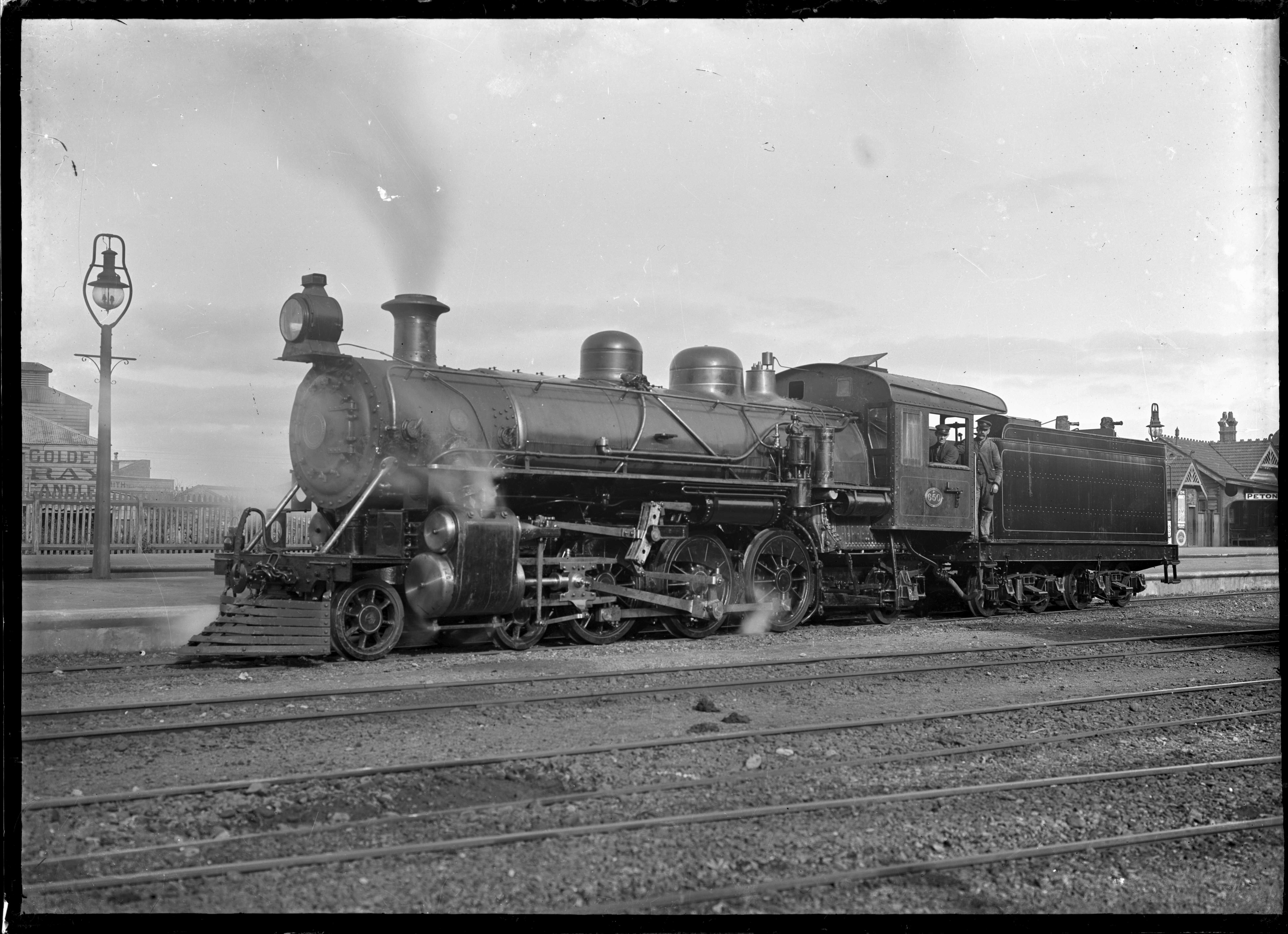
- No. 650 at Petone between 1915 and 1920
Type and origin
- Power type: Steam
- Builder: Baldwin Locomotive Works
- Build date: 1915
- Total produced: 10
Specifications
- Configuration
  - Whyte: 4-6-2
- Gauge: 3 ft 6 in (1,067 mm)
- Driver dia.: 49 in (1.245 m)
- Length: 34 ft 9 in (10.59 m)
- Adhesive weight: 34 long tons 14 cwt (77,700 lb or 35.3 t); 34 long tons 14 cwt (35.3 t; 38.9 short tons)
- Total weight: 88.5 long tons (89.9 tonnes; 99.1 short tons)
- Fuel type: Coal
- Firebox
  - Grate area: 28.3 sq ft (2.63 m^{2})
- Boiler pressure: 170 psi (1.17 MPa) (as coumpound)
- Heating surface: 1,465 sq ft (136.1 m^{2})
- Cylinders: 2
- Cylinder size: 18 in × 24 in (457 mm × 610 mm)
Performance figures
- Tractive effort: 21,580 lbf (96.0 kN)
Career
- Operators: NZGR
- Numbers: 648 - 657
- Withdrawn: 1955–1957
- Disposition: All scrapped

The NZR A^{A} class consisted of ten steam locomotives built by Baldwin Locomotive Works in 1914 to an order by Chief Mechanical Engineer, H. H. Jackson for operation on New Zealand's national rail network. They were the last steam locomotive class to be built by Baldwin works.

== Introduction and design ==
Built to a similar but vastly improved design to the Q class of 1901, they had a wheel arrangement of 4-6-2 and were suited to hauling freight services in the North Island (Originally they were to be classed Q^{B} but as they were to supplement the A class, given their aforementioned designation.) The United States built locomotives were an urgent order needed due to heavy demand with both New Zealand and British workshops unable to supply as the First World War was draining resources and manpower for the war effort. Construction was completed less than two months after the order was placed and all ten entered service in New Zealand in June 1915. Bar frames were used by the American builders instead of NZR's preferred plate frames, and the class had superheaters as built. Water capacity was double that of the A class and coal a quarter more.

== Service ==
They were worked hard for four decades before being supplanted by the more powerful "K" and "J" class families. In 1919 No. 654 was used for a very short experiment in the use of pulverized coal. Only one trip is known to have been made before the engine was converted back. They were initially equipped with grates smaller than either the A or A^{B} class. Not an issue with hard coal, increasing use of soft Waikato coal meant a larger grate was desirable. Thus the entire class had their boilers replaced with A^{B} class types starting in 1940 giving the reliable locomotives more life. This soon became a blessing when they were worked hard through the Second World War. They were used extensively on the steeply graded central North Island Main Trunk, Wanganui and Gisborne sections. In the mid-1950s most of the class were still in reasonable condition and the engines were regarded as a very successful class, capable of taking somewhat heavier loads than an A^{B} class. The first withdrawals occurred in December 1955, when six were taken out of service with their boilers returned to the A^{B} class boiler repair pool. The remaining four continued to operate until February 1957. None were preserved.

== See also ==
- NZR Q class (1901)
- NZR A/A^{D} class (1906)
- NZR A^{B} class
- NZR G class (1928)
- Locomotives of New Zealand
