= NZR BB class =

Class of New Zealand steam locomotives

NZR B^{B} class
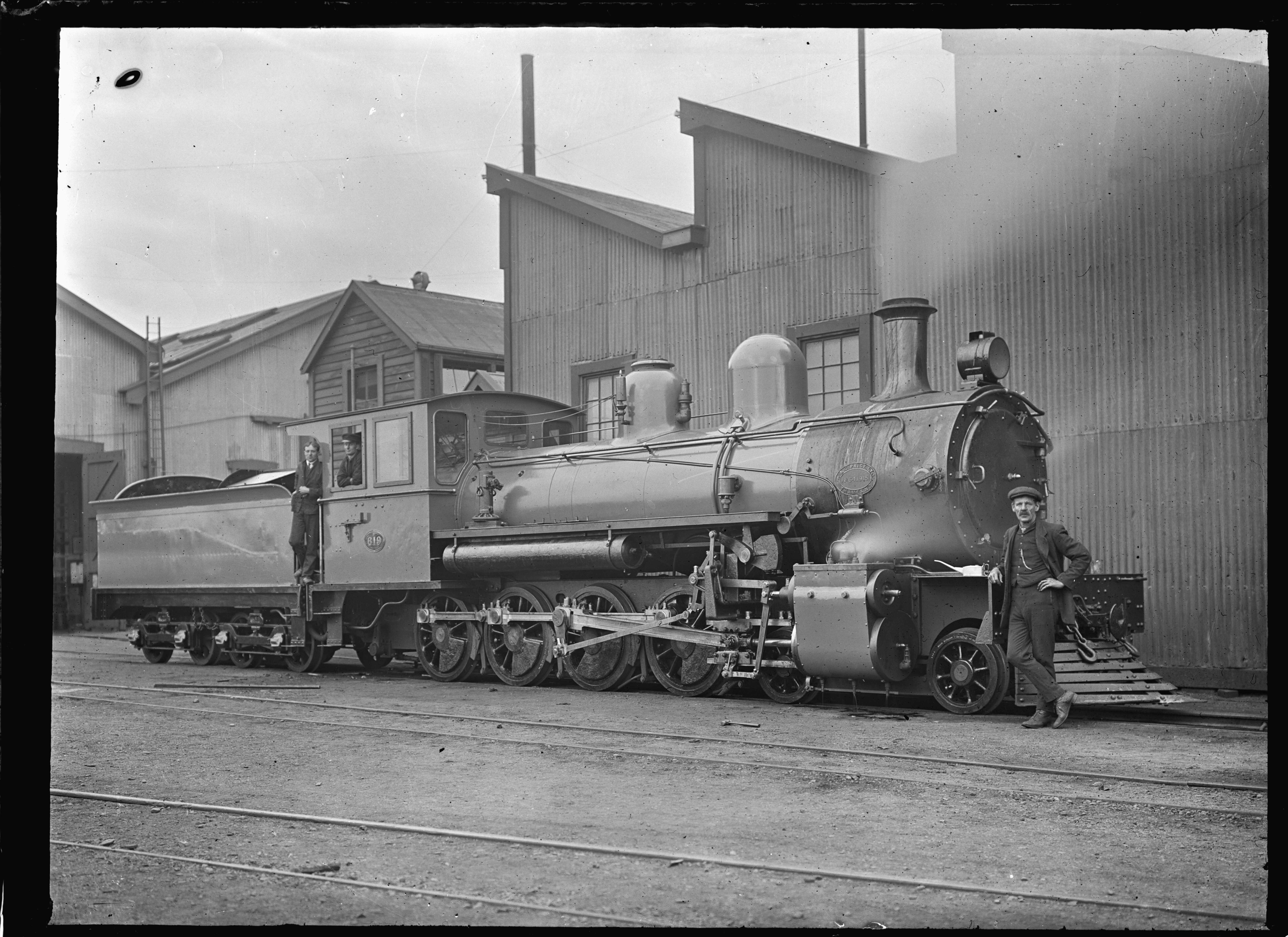
- B^{B} class 4-8-0 steam locomotive, NZR number 619, circa 1915. Godber Collection, Alexander Turnbull Library.
Type and origin
- Power type: Steam
- Builder: A & G Price, Thames, New Zealand
- Serial number: 63–92
- Build date: 1915 (12), 1916 (8), 1917 (8), 1918 (2)
Specifications
- Configuration
  - Whyte: 4-8-0
  - UIC: 2'Dh
- Gauge: 3 ft 6 in (1,067 mm)
- Driver dia.: 42.5 in (1.080 m)
- Length: 52 ft 7 1/2 in (16.04 m)
- Adhesive weight: 32.5 long tons (33.0 t; 36.4 short tons)
- Loco weight: 43.5 long tons (44.2 t; 48.7 short tons)
- Tender weight: 25.5 long tons (25.9 t; 28.6 short tons)
- Fuel type: Coal
- Fuel capacity: 4 long tons (4.1 t; 4.5 short tons)
- Water cap.: 1,700 imp gal (7,700 L; 2,000 US gal)
- Firebox
  - Grate area: 16.8 sq ft (1.56 m^{2})
- Boiler pressure: 175 psi (1.21 MPa)
- Heating surface: 724 sq ft (67.3 m^{2})
- Superheater
  - Heating area: 208 sq ft (19.3 m^{2})
- Cylinders: Two, outside
- Cylinder size: 17 in × 22 in (432 mm × 559 mm)
Performance figures
- Maximum speed: 40 mph (64 km/h)
- Tractive effort: 20,940 lbf (93.1 kN)
Career
- Number in class: 30
- Numbers: 55, 109, 143, 144, 147, 167, 169, 171, 197, 222, 618–637
- Preserved: 1 (B^{B} 144)
- Disposition: One preserved, remainder scrapped

The NZR B^{B} class of steam locomotives comprised 30 engines operated by the New Zealand Railways (NZR) in the North Island of New Zealand. Ordered to replace smaller locomotives of several classes in the North Island, they were similar in design and appearance to the preceding B and B^{A} classes. The first B^{B} class locomotive entered service in February 1915, with the last to commence operations doing so on 8 March 1917. All were built by A & G Price Ltd of Thames, New Zealand, and as their cylinders had a larger diameter than the B and B^{A} locomotives they were capable of generating more power to haul heavier trains. The most visible difference however was the roundtop firebox in place of the preceding classes Belpaire design. The B^{B} class could haul up to 700 long tons (710 t; 780 short tons) of freight on a level railway line, though they were limited to a top speed of around 40 mph (64 km/h).

== Service ==
The B^{B} class did not solely haul freight trains. They were also utilised to haul passenger trains, generally, on branch lines where light track meant trains could not be operated at speeds unattainable for the B^{B} class. These trains included services for miners working in coal mines along branches in the Waikato region (e.g. Glen Massey Branch). However, they arrived at the same time as the A^{B} class Pacific, and as these proved equally adept at hauling freight trains of similar tonnage they were proliferated while no further B^{B} types were ordered.

In the latter days of steam, powerful locomotives such as the K class were hauling heavy trains that the C class and other shunting locomotives at yards and depots simply could not handle. Accordingly, ten members of the B^{B} class were modified to perform shunting duties between 1932 and 1938, and they successfully took on the heaviest of roles.

Most B^{B} locomotives survived into the 1960s. In later years they were concentrated at the yards in Auckland, Frankton and Palmerston North. In the mid-1960s four were sent to Dunedin and Invercargill. During that decade, the complete withdrawal of the class was undertaken progressively, with the last two, B^{B} 626 and B^{B} 633, formally removed from service in August 1968. Another one of the last to be withdrawn was B^{B} 144 in October 1967. It was purchased by Les Hostick. Today it is leased to Ian Welch and is under restoration at the Mainline Steam Heritage Trust's Parnell depot. No other B^{B} locomotive has been preserved.

== See also ==
- NZR B class (1899)
- NZR B^{A} class
- NZR B^{C} class
- Locomotives of New Zealand
