= NZR A class (1906) =

Class of New Zealand 4-6-2 locomotives

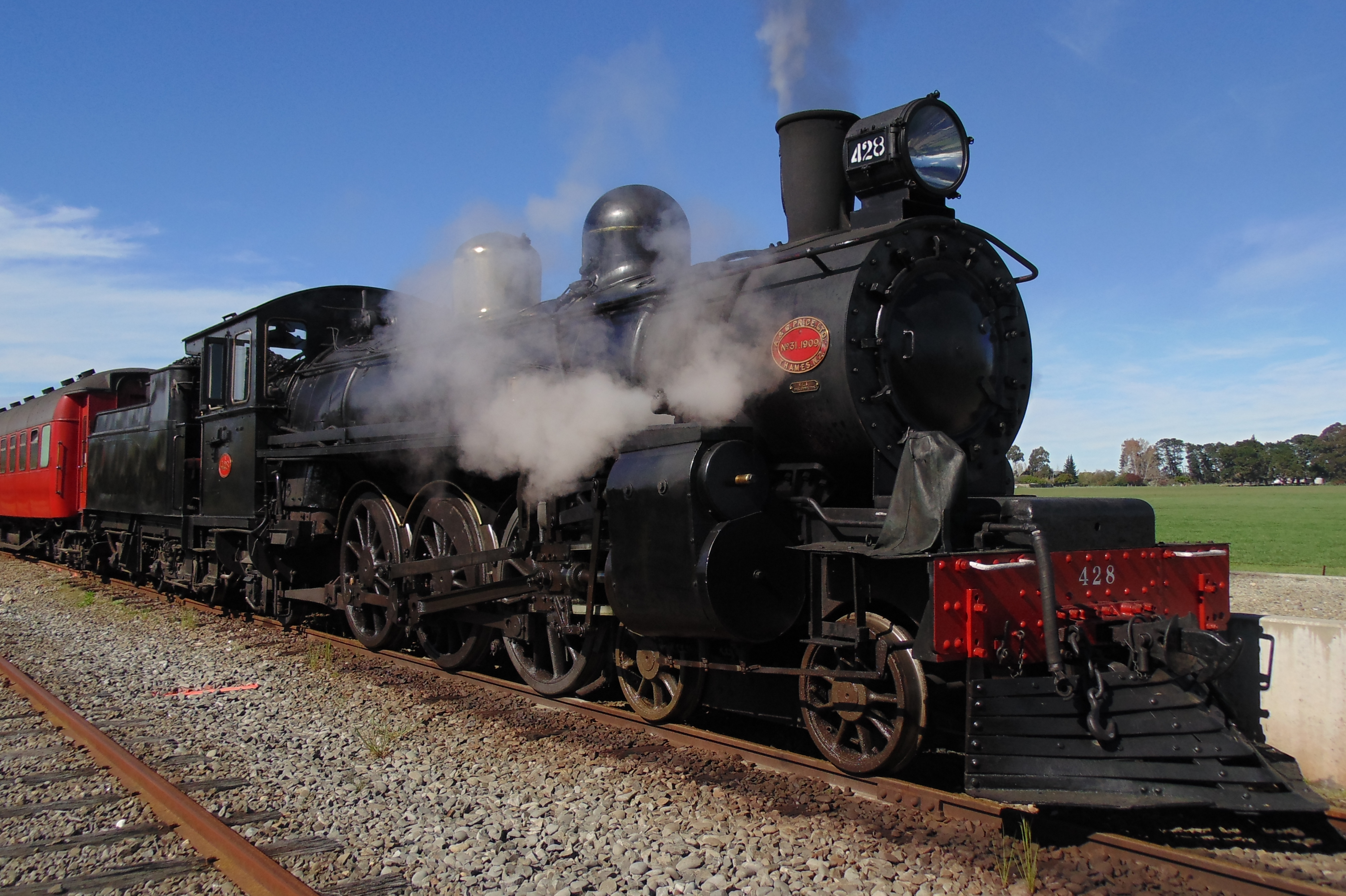
- NZR A class 428 at Glenmark Station in Waipara, 2016.
Type and origin
- Power type: Steam
- Builder: Addington Workshops (8), A & G Price (50)
- Build date: 1906–1914
- Total produced: 58
Specifications
- Configuration
  - Whyte: 4-6-2
- Gauge: 1,067 mm (3 ft 6 in)
- Driver dia.: 54 in (1.372 m)
- Length: 57 ft 2 in (17.42 m)
- Adhesive weight: 33 long tons 2 cwt (74,100 lb or 33.6 t)
- Loco weight: 51 long tons 0 cwt (114,200 lb or 51.8 t); 55 long tons 0 cwt (123,200 lb or 55.9 t)(simple)
- Tender weight: 25 long tons 10 cwt (57,100 lb or 25.9 t)
- Fuel type: Coal
- Fuel capacity: 4 long tons 0 cwt (9,000 lb or 4.1 t)
- Water cap.: 1,700 imp gal (7,700 L; 2,000 US gal)
- Firebox
  - Grate area: 30 sq ft (2.8 m^{2})
- Boiler pressure: 225 psi (1,551 kPa) (as coumpound); 190 psi (1,310 kPa)(simple)
- Heating surface: 1,724 sq ft (160.2 m^{2})
- Cylinders: 2 HP, 2 LP
- Cylinder size: 18 in × 22 in (457 mm × 559 mm)(simple)
- High-pressure cylinder: 12 in × 22 in (305 mm × 559 mm)
- Low-pressure cylinder: 19 in × 22 in (483 mm × 559 mm)
Performance figures
- Tractive effort: 17,000 lbf (76 kN) (as compound); 20,060 lbf (89.2 kN)(simple)
Career
- Operators: NZGR
- Withdrawn: 1954–1969
- Preserved: Two: 423, 428
- Disposition: Two preserved, remainder scrapped

The NZR A class were a class of steam locomotives built in 1906 with a 4-6-2 wheel arrangement for the New Zealand Railways Department (NZR). The class should not be confused with the older and more obscure A class of 1873. They were designed by the NZR's Chief Mechanical Engineer, A. L. Beattie and his Chief Draughtsman, G. A. Pearson to replace less powerful locomotives struggling with increasing loads on the South Island Main Trunk Railway, and in anticipation of the traffic volumes that would be created upon the completion of the North Island Main Trunk railway.

== Origin and design ==
The Baldwin Q had established the Pacific as the way forward for Express passenger locomotives, but the C.M.E decided that greater efficiency was needed. The new locomotives were therefore designed as compounds. The Vauclain system had proved ineffective in New Zealand so the type attributed to Frenchman Alfred de Glehn was adopted.

The first four had Stephenson valve gear inside and Walschaerts valve gear outside, while the following 53 had just Walschaerts. The first eight locomotives were built at New Zealand Railways Department's Addington Workshops, the rest by A & G Price of Thames. The first twenty-seven were built with intercepting valves allowing full simple operation. This feature was later removed from all but the first four, and the last thirty were built without and classified as A^{D} until 1915.

== Service and modifications ==
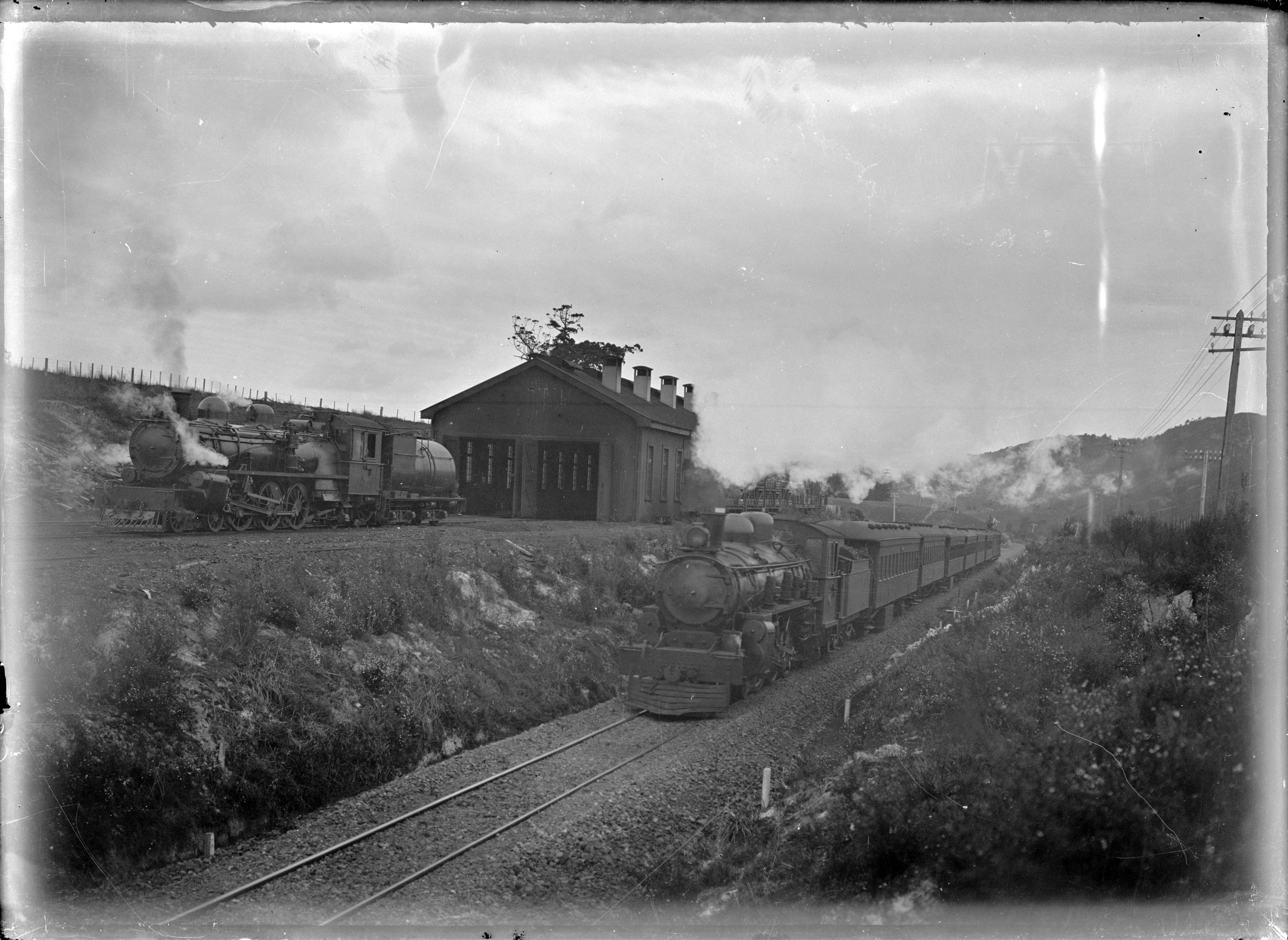
An A class engine hauls the Northland Express southbound through Maungaturoto past an A^{B} class engine outside its shed, circa late 1920s.

Initially, 50 Price built engines were allocated to the North Island the rest to the South Island. The class were delivered with 1,700 gallon tenders which were inadequate for work on the NIMT. To solve this, larger coal tenders were ordered for the B^{B} class which were given A class tenders. Delivered with saturated boilers, one of the class was given a superheated boiler after two years. Cost meant the rest were converted only as their boilers wore out. From the 1930s, onward the class were fitted with pressed-steel smokebox doors for Waikato spark arrestors, although not always the arrestors themselves.

Although competent engines the maintenance of the inner cylinders was difficult. In 1941, No. 582 was converted to a two-cylinder simple arrangement. The last engines was finished in 1949 and the class remained successful performers thereafter.

Until the arrival of large numbers of the A^{B} class, the A class were New Zealand's premier express engines. Starting in 1932, 38 of the North Island engines went south. By this time, they were being relegated to secondary and branch line service. Despite this, the last North Island steam engine was not withdrawn until 1961 and the last in the south until 1969, near the end of steam. The final A class to be withdrawn was A 428.

== Preservation ==
Two class members have been preserved:

- A 423 was saved by Kevin and Paul Jowett in 1970. In September 1970, the 'A' and B^{A} 552 were used on a steam delivery trip between Palmerston North and Frankton, with the 'B^{A}' leading for much of the journey. The 'A' was later put on static display at the defunct Waikato Railway Museum in Te Awamutu, which was the New Zealand Railway and Locomotive Societys Waikato Branch. Between 21 and 22 April 2008, it was moved to the Glenbrook Vintage Railway and is now in storage.
- A 428 was saved by the A 428 Preservation Society in 1973 after being stored at the roundhouse at Elmer Lane, Greymouth. It was towed from Greymouth to Christchurch by a single DJ class locomotive. Then it was towed from Christchurch to the Weka Pass Railway in Waipara with the Weka Pass Railway's recently purchased carriages. The train was hauled by another member of the DJ class and the Weka Pass Railway's two DG class locomotives on 10 December 1983. Restoration commenced in late 1988, and A 428 was recommissioned on 25 September 1993.

== A 409 ==
The eighth locomotive built, A 409, was built in 1908 as a two-cylinder simple-expansion locomotive for comparative purposes against the four-cylinder compounds. Fitted with an ALCO superheater as a trial when built, it was marginally more powerful than the other A class locomotives as a result despite having only two cylinders. Despite its differences, it was classified for a time just as A^{B} 409 up until the 1930s along with the mechanically derived A^{B} class locomotives.

A 409 was withdrawn from service in October 1959 and was scrapped at Linwood locomotive depot as being largely non-standard.

== See also ==
- NZR Q class (1901)
- NZR A^{A} class
- NZR A^{B} class
- NZR G class (1928)
- Locomotives of New Zealand
