= NZR Q class (1901) =

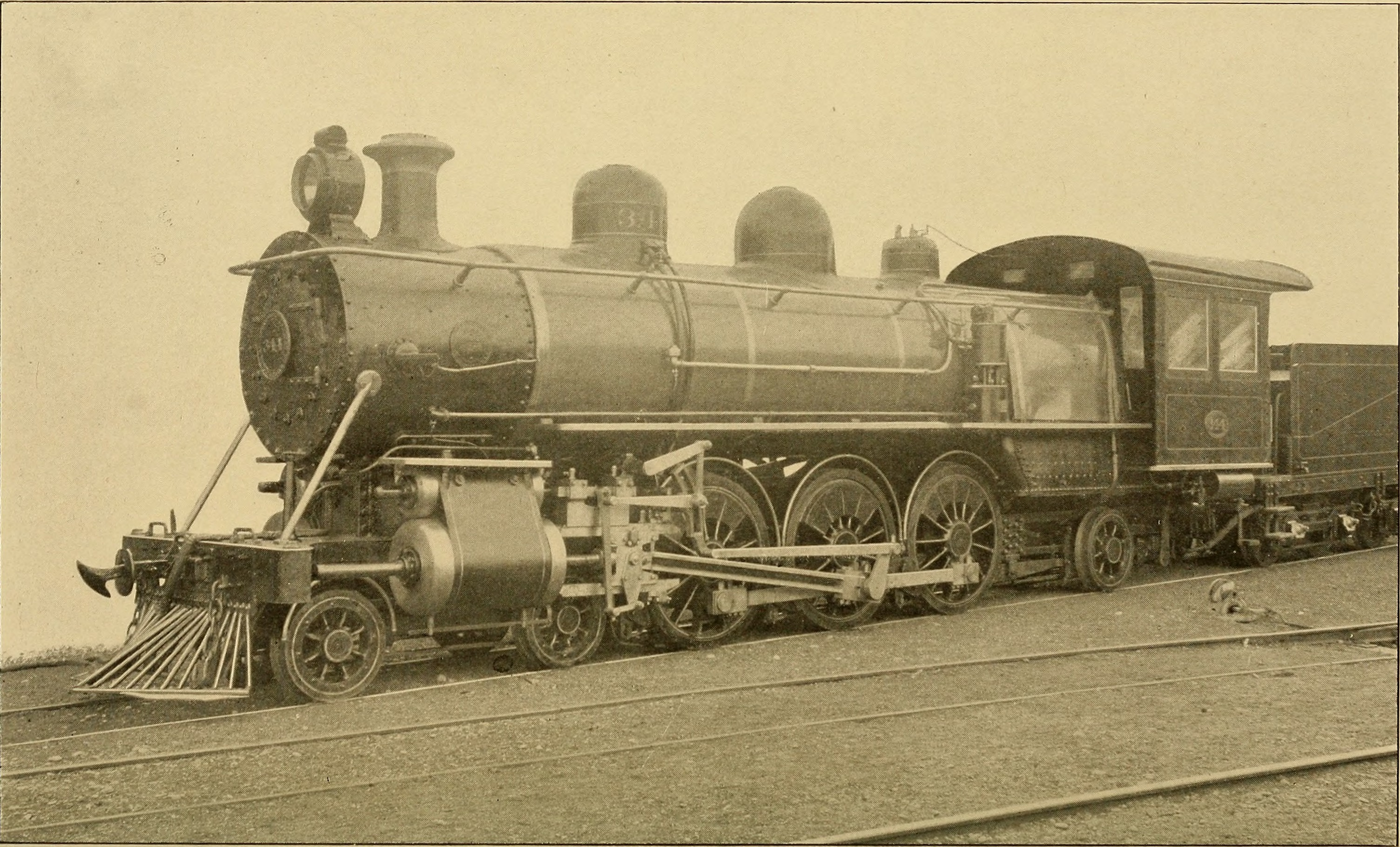
- Builder's photo of NZR Q class locomotive No. 344
Type and origin
- Power type: Steam
- Builder: Baldwin Locomotive Works, Philadelphia, USA
- Serial number: 19202–19207; 19248–19254
- Build date: 1901
- Total produced: 13
Specifications
- Configuration
  - Whyte: 4-6-2
- Gauge: 3 ft 6 in (1,067 mm)
- Driver dia.: 49.1 in (1.247 m)
- Wheelbase: 48 ft 4 in (14.73 m)
- Length: 55 ft 4 in (16.87 m)
- Adhesive weight: 30.7 long tons (31.2 t; 34.4 short tons)
- Loco weight: 48.0 long tons (48.8 t; 53.8 short tons)
- Tender weight: 24.1 long tons (24.5 t; 27.0 short tons)
- Total weight: 72.1 long tons (73.3 t; 80.8 short tons)
- Fuel type: Coal
- Fuel capacity: 5.0 long tons (5.1 t; 5.6 short tons)
- Water cap.: 1,700 imp gal (7,700 L; 2,000 US gal)
- Firebox
  - Grate area: 40 sq ft (3.7 m^{2})
- Boiler pressure: 200 psi (1,379 kPa)
- Heating surface: 1,683 sq ft (156.4 m^{2})
- Cylinders: Two
- Cylinder size: 16 in × 22 in (406 mm × 559 mm)
- Loco brake: Steam
- Train brakes: Air
Performance figures
- Tractive effort: 18,340 lbf (81.6 kN)
Career
- Number in class: 13
- Numbers: 338-350
- Locale: Auckland - Rotorua; Oamaru - Dunedin
- First run: 1901-12-24
- Retired: 1957-12-07
- Disposition: All scrapped

The NZR Q class was an important steam locomotive class not only in the history of New Zealand's railway network but also in worldwide railways in general. Designed by New Zealand Government Railways' (NZR) Chief Mechanical Engineer A. L. Beattie and ordered from the Baldwin Locomotive Works in 1901, they were the first locomotives in the world to be built with the wheel arrangement of 4-6-2. This wheel arrangement came to be known as the Pacific type after the voyage the completed locomotives made across the Pacific Ocean to New Zealand. A few instances of the 4-6-2 wheel arrangement are known to have existed prior to 1901, but these were all reconstructions of locomotives that were originally built with a different wheel arrangement, thereby making the thirteen members of the Q class the first "true" Pacifics in the world. The Pacific style went on to become arguably the most famous wheel arrangement in the world.

== Design ==
The Q class's design stems from the requirement for a locomotive similar to the U^{B} class with the inclusion of a wide Wootten firebox to burn poor quality lignite coal from the South Island and the Waikato. Originally plans to equip the new locomotives with a Wootten firebox would have seen the "Camelback" configuration adopted, an arrangement which A. L. Beattie thoroughly rejected.

== Operation ==
In operation, the locomotives proved to be satisfactory rather than brilliant and they suffered from occasional valve gear problems. They were soon displaced from the most important and difficult work by members of the A and A^{B} classes; in fact, later in life, they were re-boilered with A^{B} boilers. An improved slightly larger 'Q' type was ordered from Baldwins in 1914, but classified A^{A} due to their dimensions being similar to the A class.

In a 1902 trial of various locomotives between Invercargill and Gore, the Q class with large fire-grate area "gave the most efficient results" of the larger locomotives.

== Withdrawal ==
They saw out their final years working in Otago and the West Coast and the last Q class locomotive was retired in 1957. No examples of the class were preserved.

== See also ==
- NZR Q class (1878)
- NZR A/A^{D} class (1906)
- NZR A^{A} class
- NZR A^{B} class
- NZR G class (1928)
- Locomotives of New Zealand
