= NZR BC class =

NZR B^{C} class
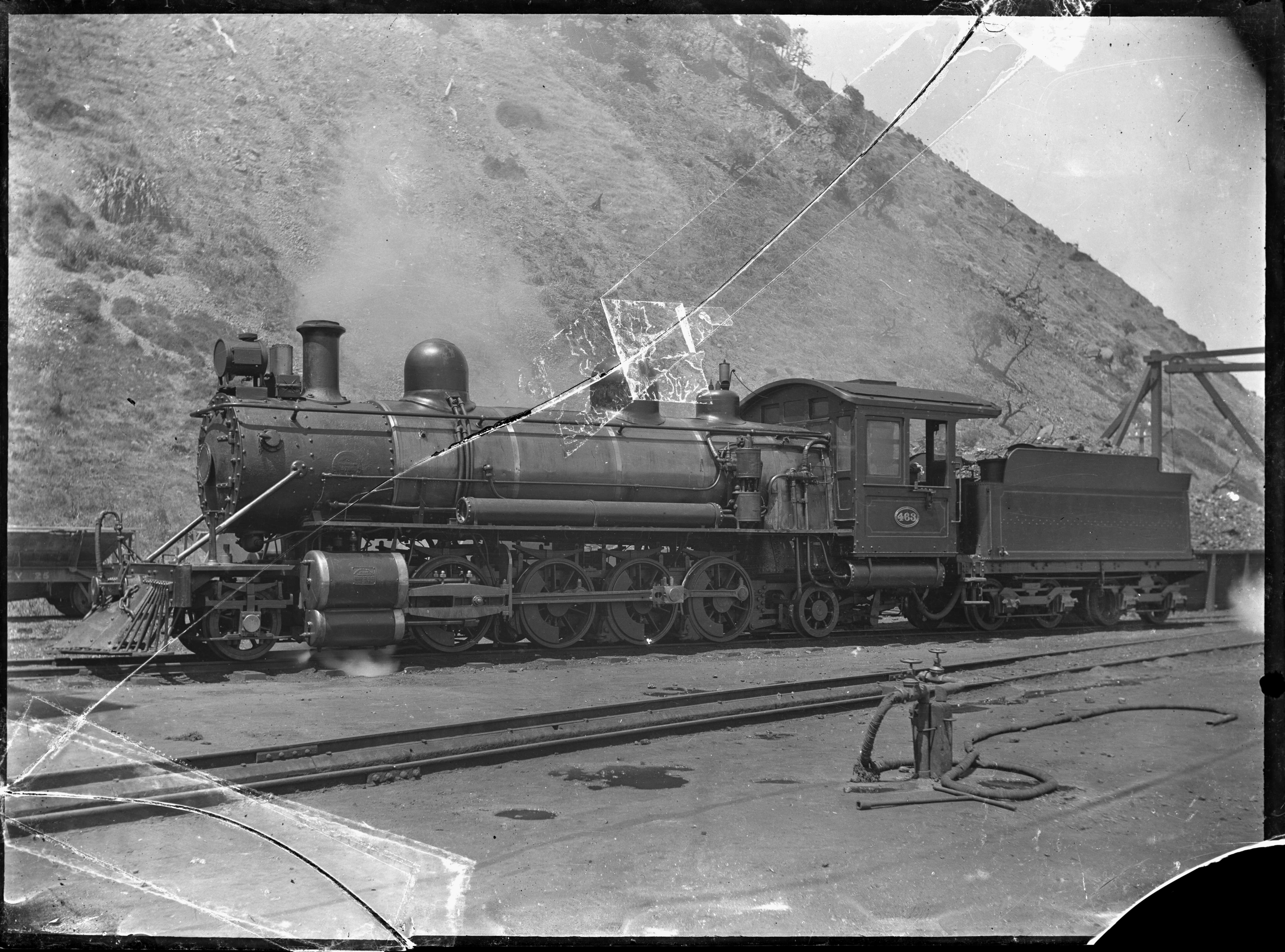
- B^{C} class steam locomotive, NZR number 463. Godber Collection, Alexander Turnbull Library.
Type and origin
- Power type: Steam
- Builder: Baldwin Locomotive Works
- Serial number: 19796
- Build date: 1901
- Total produced: 1
Specifications
- Configuration
  - Whyte: 2-8-2
  - UIC: 1'D1'
- Gauge: 3 ft 6 in (1,067 mm)
- Driver dia.: 43 in (1.092 m)
- Length: 55 ft 7 in (16.94 m)
- Total weight: 71.4 long tons (72.5 t; 80.0 short tons)
- Fuel type: Coal
- Fuel capacity: 4.0 long tons (4.1 t; 4.5 short tons)
- Water cap.: 1,660 imperial gallons (7,500 L; 1,990 US gal)
- Firebox
  - Grate area: 25 sq ft (2.3 m^{2})
- Boiler pressure: 200 lbf/in^{2} (1.38 MPa)
- Heating surface: 1,477 sq ft (137.2 m^{2})
- Cylinders: 4 (2 HP, 2 LP)
- Cylinder size: HP 11.5 in × 20 in (292 mm × 508 mm); LP 19 in × 20 in (483 mm × 508 mm)
Performance figures
- Tractive effort: 16,080 lbf (71.53 kN)
Career
- Operators: Wellington and Manawatu Railway, New Zealand Government Railways
- Numbers: WMR 17, NZR 463
- Withdrawn: March 1927

The NZR B^{C} class comprised a single steam locomotive that operated on New Zealand's national rail network. Built for the Wellington and Manawatu Railway (WMR) and classified as No. 17, it passed into the ownership of the New Zealand Railways Department (NZR) when the government purchased the WMR in December 1908, and it was then that it acquired the B^{C} classification as B^{C} 463.

== Introduction ==
The WMR ordered No.17 from the Baldwin Locomotive Works. It entered service on 10 June 1902 and was at the time the most powerful locomotive to operate in the country. No.17 was the only 2-8-2 "Mikado" to run in New Zealand. At the time of its arrival, it was the largest engine in the country. It was a Vauclain compound, and its trailing truck bore similarities to the Q class, the world's first 4-6-2 "Pacific" type then under construction by Baldwin for NZR.

The Baldwin Locomotive Works had taken the design of the locomotive almost directly from the original Mikado, that they built for the Nippon Railway of Japan in 1897. No. 17 was the Japanese engine fitted with a Q class boiler. It was then only the third Mikado to be built in the world.

The locomotive was designed to haul trains on the WMR's steep main line between Wellington and Paekākāriki, and it proved capable of hauling a 280-ton freight train up the steep grades. This line became the southern portion of the North Island Main Trunk Railway when acquired by NZR in 1908.

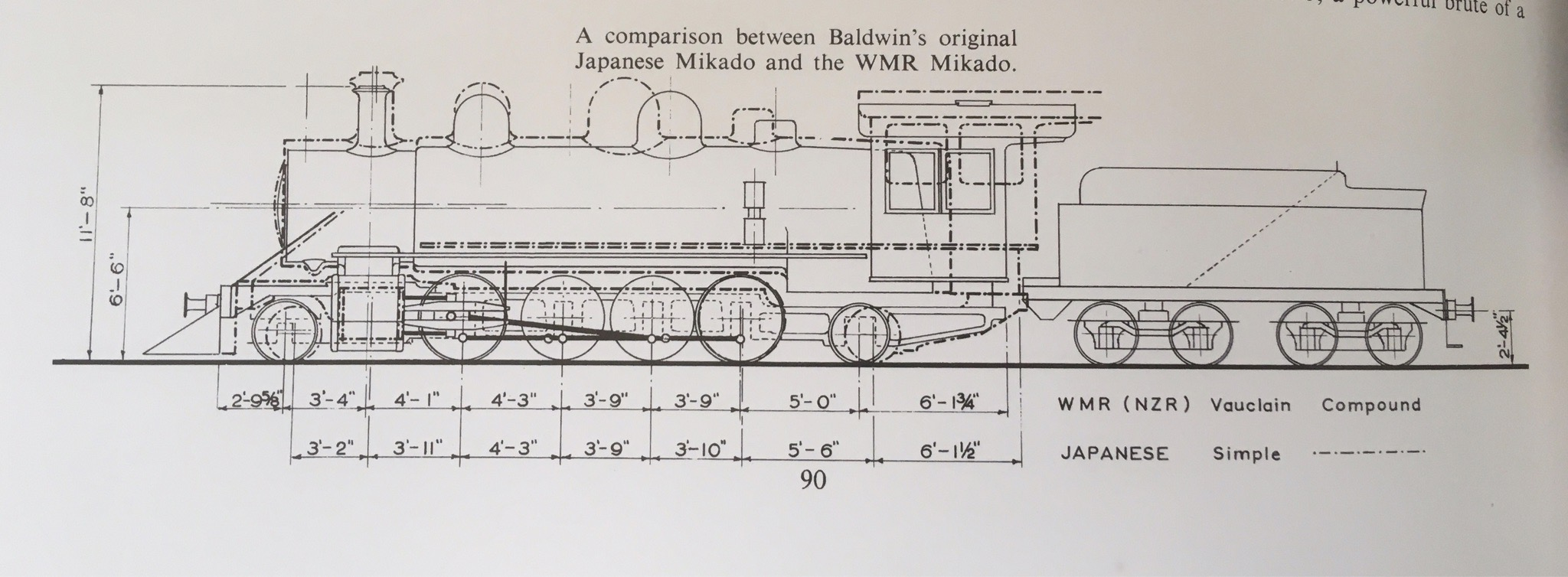
A diagram comparing the Baldwin-built WMR 2-8-2 No. 17 with the first Mikado class built for the Nippon Railway in 1897.

== Withdrawal ==
No.17/B^{C} 463 worked this line its entire life. It operated for nearly two decades in NZR's ownership until it was withdrawn on 31 March 1927 along with fellow surviving WMR locomotives when NZR adopted a rapid locomotive standardisation plan in the 1920s. It did not survive to be preserved. Only the brass bell from the locomotive survived and was placed on display at Wellington railway station. A decade after it was withdrawn, the steepest section of its former line was bypassed by the Tawa Flat deviation and became the Johnsonville Branch.

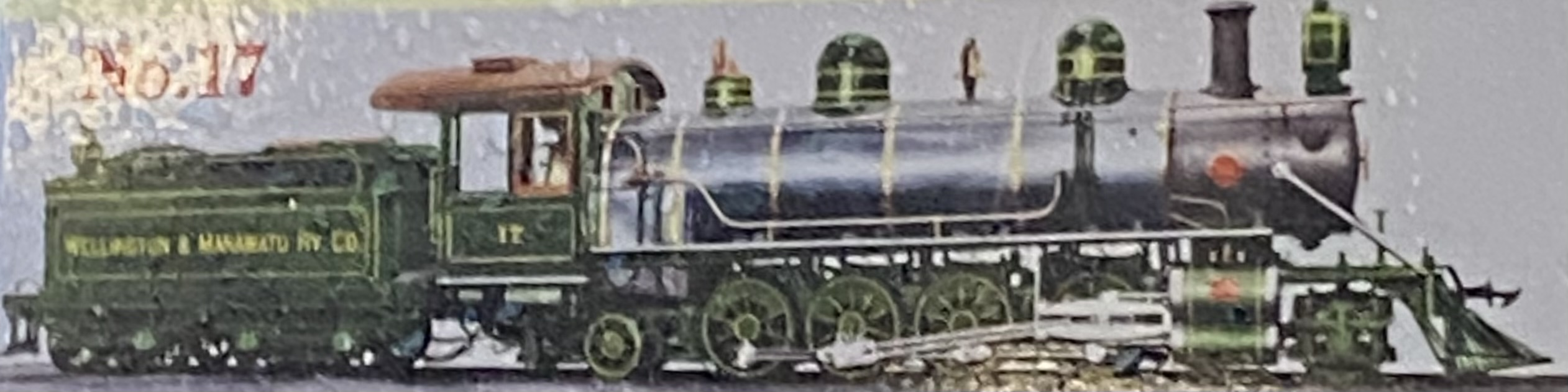
Colourised Builder's photo of WMR no.17/NZR Bc no.463

== See also ==
- NZR Class B of 1874
- NZR Class B of 1899
- Locomotives of New Zealand
