= Alfred Price (engineer) =

New Zealand manufacturing engineer

Alfred Price (1838–1907) was a New Zealand manufacturing engineer. He was born in France Lynch, Gloucestershire, England in 1838.
