= NZR AB class =

Class of New Zealand steam locomotives

NZR A^{B} class
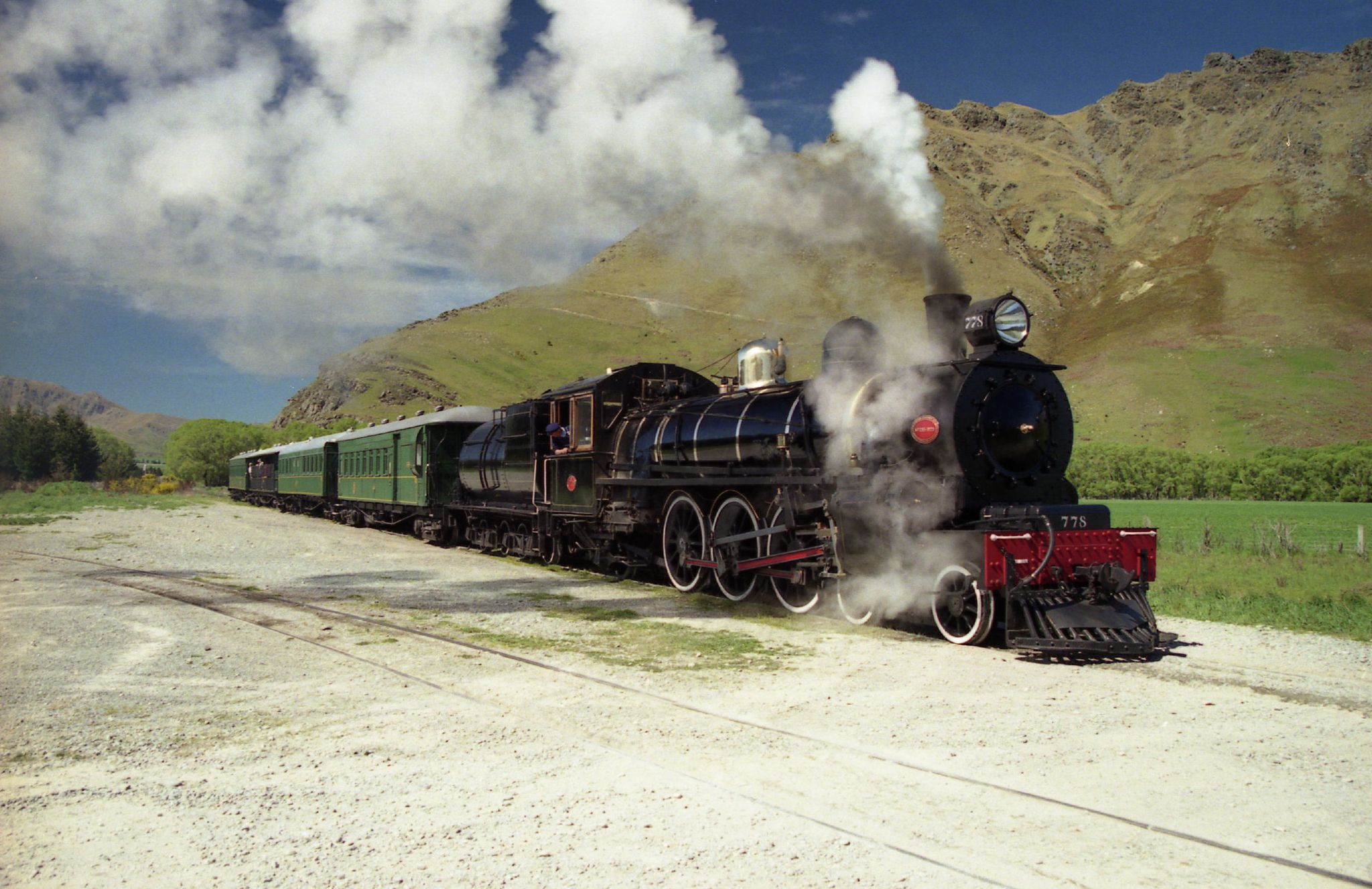
- Preserved A^{B} 778 hauling the Kingston Flyer on 3 November 2006.
Type and origin
- Power type: Steam
- Builder: NZGR Addington Workshops (38); North British Locomotive Company (83); A & G Price, Thames (20)
- Build date: 1915–1918, 1921–1927
- Total produced: 141
Specifications
- Configuration
  - Whyte: 4-6-2
- Gauge: 3 ft 6 in (1,067 mm)
- Driver dia.: 54 in (1.372 m)
- Wheelbase: 52 ft 6 in (16.00 m)
- Length: 62 ft 5 in (19.02 m)
- Loco weight: 51.3 long tons (52.1 tonnes; 57.5 short tons)
- Tender weight: 33.4 long tons (33.9 tonnes; 37.4 short tons)
- Total weight: 84.7 long tons (86.1 tonnes; 94.9 short tons)
- Fuel type: Coal
- Fuel capacity: 4.0 long tons (4.1 tonnes; 4.5 short tons)
- Water cap.: 3,500 imp gal (16,000 L; 4,200 US gal)
- Firebox
  - Grate area: 33 sq ft (3.1 m^{2})
- Boiler pressure: 180 lbf/in^{2} (1.24 MPa)
- Heating surface: 1,148 sq ft (106.7 m^{2})
- Superheater
  - Heating area: 204 sq ft (19.0 m^{2})
- Cylinders: Two, outside
- Cylinder size: 17 in × 26 in (432 mm × 660 mm)
Performance figures
- Maximum speed: 60 mph (97 km/h)
- Tractive effort: 20,030 lbf (89.10 kN)
Career
- Operators: NZR
- Numbers: 608–838
- Locale: All of New Zealand
- First run: October 1915
- Withdrawn: 1963–1969
- Preserved: 7 (608, 663, 699, 745, 778, 795, 832)
- Current owner: Kingston Flyer, Steam Incorporated, Mainline Steam, Pleasant Point Museum and Railway, Museum of Transport and Technology, Ferrymead Railway, Rimutaka Incline Railway Heritage Trust.
- Disposition: Seven preserved, two lost in a shipwreck off Great Barrier Island in 1922, remainder scrapped.

The NZR A^{B} class are a class of 4-6-2 Pacific tender steam locomotive that operated on New Zealand's national railway system for New Zealand Railways (NZR). Originally an improvement on the 1906 A class, 141 were built between 1915 and 1927 by NZR's Addington Workshops, A & G Price of Thames, New Zealand, and North British Locomotive Company, making the A^{B} class the largest class of steam locomotives ever to run in New Zealand.

== Construction and design ==
The genesis of the A^{B} class originated from the construction of A class 4-6-2 No. 409 at Addington Railway Workshops near Christchurch in 1906. A two-cylinder simple-expansion locomotive, 409 was initially classified A^{B} to differentiate it from the four-cylinder compound A and A^{D} class locomotives, which were by and large of a similar design although built as compounds. A^{B} 409 was, in reality, the experimental locomotive for what would become the most prolific type on the New Zealand Railways network, with construction beginning on a new prototype 4-6-2 in 1915.

The new locomotive, A^{B} 608, was to a completely different design from A^{B} 409 when it emerged from the Addington Railway Workshops in 1915. Although largely similar to the A class, it had a brand new design of cab and boiler, which was fitted with a superheater after trials conducted on A^{B} 409. It also had the distinctive Vanderbilt tender, which would become a hallmark of the A^{B} class during its working life. This locomotive was to become the first of 142 similar locomotives built by various builders in New Zealand and the United Kingdom for NZR, the most numerous class of any locomotive in New Zealand.

2 North British-made locomotives were lost in the wreckage of the SS Wiltshire in May 1922.

== Introduction ==
The A^{B} class compared more favourably in service against the compound A class. Reputedly the first engine able to generate one horsepower for every 100 pounds of weight (16.4 W/kg), the A^{B} class was efficient and versatile, and the engines were easy to maintain and operate. It became clear that there were several shortcomings of the design – notably the cab was too small, and the tenders were not sturdy enough. A new and longer cab was fitted to all new locomotives being built from that time onwards, with the first appearing on A^{B} 663. New tender structures were also built at a later date.

The locomotives were extremely versatile, and the A^{B} class were used on almost every section of the NZR network, the exception being the Nelson Section (closed 1955). In later years, the class were displaced from their mainline duties first by the larger J and K class locomotives, and later by the arrival of diesel locomotives (D^{A} and D^{G} classes in the North Island, D^{H} and D^{J} classes in the South Island). As a result of the arrival of diesel locomotives in the North Island from 1955 onwards, many of the North Island-based locomotives were transferred to the South Island to see out their remaining working lives.

The final duties of the A^{B} class were on branch line workings, where they found their niche after being displaced from most mainline duties by larger locomotives. These in turn displaced the A and Q class 4-6-2 locomotives from their duties, resulting in the withdrawal of all Q-class locomotives by 1957 and a reduction in the number of A class locomotives. The locomotives also worked some lesser mainline duties, and others, such as those at Gisborne, were used as bankers to assist trains heading south to Napier.

Being highly capable, the A^{B} class were used for both freight and passenger trains. The A^{B} class was easily able to pull an express passenger train at speeds of 100 km/h (62 mph), or haul 700-tonne goods trains on easy grades. Along with the earlier F class, they were known as the "Maids for all work". Their work on express passenger trains was diminished by the arrival of the J class of 1939, and K class of 1932 tender locomotives in the 1930s, and also with the introduction of the heavier steel-panelled carriages built from 1930 until 1943. Despite being displaced, the A^{B} class could still be found at work on relief expresses during holiday periods.

The locomotives did not change greatly during their NZR career. The first change was to fit Waikato-type spark arrestors to many of the North Island-based engines, resulting in a new pear-shaped smokebox with an ash hopper at the base. The cast-iron smokebox doors were replaced by steel ones, and the brake pump was moved from its original location on the right-hand side of the smokebox to a new position, recessed into the running board, just forward of the cab on the same side.

Another notable change was that many of the class were fitted with ballast blocks for mechanical purposes. As the locomotives rode well, this was not to prevent derailments as with the Q class 4-6-2s of 1901. Furthermore, certain engines were not fitted with ballast blocks. Other cosmetic changes included fitting a large Pyle National electric headlight on top of the smokebox and replacement of the copper-capped funnels with the standard NZR "flowerpot" type.

== Components ==
=== Boilers ===
The A^{B} type boiler had a working pressure of 180psi, a standard across the class. These boilers were of standard construction, no matter which firm built them, and as such were interchangeable across any locomotives of the class. The W^{AB} boiler and A^{B} boilers were the same, with those fitted to the W^{AB} fitted with the necessary components to draw water from the locomotive's side tanks.

This type of boiler was also adapted for use on the Q and A^{A} class 4-6-2 tender locomotives of 1901 and 1915, respectively, when their original boilers wore out. In the case of the A^{A} class, the boiler change was not necessitated by the condition of the boilers but due to the limitations of the original boilers. The replacement took place in the 1930s, and these locomotives gained more reliability before they were withdrawn in 1957 (at the same time as the Q class). All of these boilers were then put back into the A^{B} class pool and were reused on engines of that class.

In all, 6 separate classes used the standard A^{B} boiler. When the Q, A^{A} and G class locomotives were scrapped in the 1950s, the boilers were overhauled to keep locomotives of the A, A^{B}, and W^{AB} classes serviceable.

=== Tenders ===
Throughout their NZR careers, the A^{B} class were known for their Vanderbilt tenders - one of three classes to use this tender, the others being the re-built G class 4-6-2, and the later the J, J^{A} and J^{B} class 4-8-2 engines. The tenders, although satisfactory, suffered from having been constructed too lightly for the intended task, and were also prone to rusting, particularly around the frame channels. This necessitated the complete replacement of the tender frames from some locomotives.

The standard A^{B} tender design was adapted for the three-cylinder G class locomotive 4-6-2 tender locomotive rebuilds of 1937. These tenders had a more substantial tender underframe and were also unique in that the body was of welded construction rather than the traditional riveted style. As such, they became known as the 'G' style tender. When the six locomotives were withdrawn in 1956, their tenders were fitted to A^{B} class locomotives.

Further G-type tenders were constructed later on by Addington Railway Workshops (Christchurch) and Otahuhu Workshops (Auckland) for A^{B} class locomotives whose tenders were not considered to be economically repairable. This was not always the case:

- A^{B} 688 received a 'G' type tender to replace its original tender, which was wrecked in the Blind River derailment of 25 February 1948. This accident was attributed to the lack of a reliable speedometer on the locomotive, causing relief driver Jim Gurr to misjudge his speed.
- A^{B} 743 received a 'G' type tender after it was derailed by a 7.1 magnitude earthquake centred near Inangahua Junction on 24 May 1968. The locomotive was hauling a goods train from Greymouth to Westport when the earthquake struck, causing the locomotive's tender to fall down onto its side. The damaged tender was written off, and a new 'G' type tender was constructed to replace it.

With 141 members of this type in New Zealand, tenders were inevitably swapped with other locomotives. For example, a locomotive undergoing overhaul might lose its good-condition tender to another with a poor-condition tender to speed up the process of outshopping the second locomotive. All tenders of the type were numbered; the number was made out of weld and was positioned just below the tender headlight bracket.

The tenders initially rode on drawing x-6002 standard bogies fitted with grease-lubricated bearings. Later, drawing x-10161 bogies, still fitted with grease-lubricated bearings, were substituted on some locomotives as they came in for an overhaul. A later variant was the drawing x-11183 'Timken' roller-bearing bogie fitted to the W^{AB} class conversions of 1947-57 and as used under the G class locomotive tenders from 1937. Enthusiasts were able to identify these different types of bogies by their design characteristics - for example, the x-6002 bogies had a prominent journal box and were made of steel bar sections.

=== Frame replacement ===
During the late 1950s to early 1960s, many older A^{B} class locomotives were being withdrawn as they wore out and were replaced by locomotives displaced from other regions. With many engines still in relatively good condition, these engines were cannibalised following withdrawal to keep other engines going until they were either worn out or replaced by the new diesel locomotives then being purchased by NZR. This became a fairly common practice at the time; as the locomotives were of a standard design, parts could be taken from any engine to ensure another could keep running for some time to come.

One example of this was A^{B} 792, one of the ten W^{AB} class conversions from 1947 to 1957. Shopped for an 'A' grade overhaul at Hillside Workshops, the locomotive had a cracked mainframe but was otherwise in mechanically good condition. It was decided to use part of the good-condition frames from under A^{B} 661, then recently withdrawn, to replace the damaged section from 792. The locomotive's frame was then altered by cutting the affected section out and fitting the new frame section, ex-661.

This meant that certain locomotives should have changed identity - the identity of the locomotive is attached to the frame of the locomotive. A^{B} 792 should have become A^{B} 661 as a result of the frame repairs. With 661 written off and 792 being a younger locomotive that still had an economic career ahead, NZR would not have considered returning 661 to service and scrapping 792.

== Withdrawal ==
The majority of the class was withdrawn from NZR services during the 1960s, as diesel traction replaced steam, with the last concentrations of the A^{B} class being located on the West Coast and in Southland. Many of those withdrawn were South Island locomotives which had reached the end of their economic lives between 1963 and 1967 (when the D^{J} class diesels arrived) and were replaced by ex-North Island locomotives. By 1971, several remained on the books at the close of steam operations on NZR.

Three remained on NZR books in 1972 - A^{B}'s 778 and 795 remained at Lyttelton to heat all the carriages for the "Boat Train", formerly known in an informal manner as the "Jackaroo", while A^{B} 663 remained either at Greymouth's Elmer Lane locomotive depot or at Dunedin. With interest in a nostalgic steam-operated train growing, both 778 and 795 were restored that same year for the famous Kingston Flyer. A^{B} 663 was used initially at Dunedin for spare parts to keep 778 and 795, now named David McKellar and Greenvale respectively.

== Names ==
A^{B} 608 gained the notable distinction of being named Passchendaele in 1918 to commemorate the NZR staff who had been killed in the First World War. The locomotive had its nameplates removed in the 1940s, and they were placed on display in the Christchurch and Dunedin railway stations. Two replicas were made in 1963 for the NZR centenary event, and these are held by the New Zealand Railway & Locomotive Society. Other reproductions have been made, including one for the KiwiRail War Memorial at Hutt Workshops, which was dedicated in 2010. This was the only steam locomotive to be named after 1877.

A^{B} 663 was named Sharon Lee when it was restored to running condition in early 1997. The locomotive is named after Sharon Lee Welch, daughter of Mainline Steam Trust principal Ian Welch.

A^{B} 778 and A^{B} 795 were named David McKellar (778) and Greenvale (795) respectively by NZR in 1971 when they were overhauled for the Kingston Flyer heritage train between Lumsden and Kingston. The track now only runs between Kingston and Fairlight.

== Tank version ==
The W^{AB} class of 1917 was a tank locomotive version of the A^{B} class. Eleven A^{B} class locomotives were rebuilt as W^{AB} class locomotives between 1947 and 1957.

== Preservation ==
Seven A^{B} class locomotives have been preserved:

- A^{B} 608 Passchendaele was donated by NZR to the New Zealand Railway and Locomotive Society in 1967 as the class leader of the A^{B} class. It was towed to Ferrymead in 1972 and remained there until 1993 when Steam Incorporated of Paekakariki indicated an interest in leasing and restoring 608. It was towed to Wellington as part of a Steam Incorporated excursion in November 1993, and work began to restore the steam locomotive in 1997, with the stripping of the engine unit for restoration. The locomotive received a new tender body and was fitted with stronger 'Janney yoke' drawgear to facilitate towing of the locomotive by a mainline locomotive if necessary. A^{B} 608 was recommissioned on 25 April 2014 and is now operational and mainline certified.
- A^{B} 663 Sharon Lee was used as the spare parts source for the Kingston Flyer until purchased by Ian Welch of the Mainline Steam Heritage Trust in 1983. It was returned to service in June 1997 with a coal tender formerly with A^{B} 811, which had been scrapped. It has been named Sharon Lee after one of Ian Welch's daughters and is notable in having its headlight mounted on the front end of the smokebox and having been converted to burn fuel oil instead of coal, making it the first oil-fired Pacific.
- A^{B} 699 is owned by the Pleasant Point Museum and Railway and runs regularly on their line between Pleasant Point and Keanes Crossing, a distance of 2 kilometres (1.2 mi). Purchased for static display at Pleasant Point station, it arrived on 5 November 1970. It was later restored to operating condition, first steaming in 1974 and has been a popular attraction at the railway ever since. It is the only surviving A^{B} class locomotive built by A & G Price.
- A^{B} 745 was derailed by embankment subsidence at Hāwera in 1956. Rather than recover the locomotive, NZR salvaged all parts from the right-hand (driver's) side of the locomotive and buried it along with several V class insulated meat vans. The engine unit of 745 was dug out of the embankment in 2001. As of September 2012, A^{B} 745 was owned by The Taranaki Flyer Society Inc., and they were restoring the locomotive in the former railway goods shed in Stratford, Taranaki, New Zealand. It is now owned by the Rimutaka Incline Railway Heritage Trust after the Taranaki Flyer Society Inc.'s leased building was vacated at the end of 2013. The A^{B} will be a long-term restoration project by the railway. Along with A^{B} 832, it was one of only two surviving North British-built A^{B} class locomotives.
- A^{B} 778 is owned by the Kingston Flyer. Named David McKellar. It is currently out of service, requiring a major boiler overhaul.
- A^{B} 795, converted from a W^{AB} class 4-6-4T tank locomotive in the period 1947–1957, was owned by the Kingston Flyer. Named Greenvale. It was maintained in operational condition and was currently operated on a long stretch of line originating at Kingston. It is the only surviving A^{B} class locomotive built by Hillside.
- A^{B} 832, the last steam locomotive to work in the North Island when steam ended there in 1967, was donated by NZR to the Museum of Transport and Technology. Stored pending restoration at MOTAT 2. It was on long-term lease to the Glenbrook Vintage Railway and was stored at the GVR's Pukeoware depot until August 2018. Along with A^{B} 745 it is one of only two surviving North British-built A^{B} class locomotives.

== See also ==
- NZR Q class (1901)
- NZR A/A^{D} class (1906)
- NZR A^{A} class
- NZR G class (1928)
- Locomotives of New Zealand
