= Lynx Express =

Overview
- Service type: Inter City Rail
- Status: Terminated
- Locale: South Island, New Zealand
- First service: 19 December 1994
- Last service: 18 April 1995
- Former operator: InterCity Rail

Route
- Termini: Picton; Christchurch
- Stops: Blenheim, Kaikōura
- Distance travelled: 348 kilometres (216 mi)
- Average journey time: 5 hours 5 minutes (south); 5 hours 3 minutes (north)
- Line used: Main North Line

Technical
- Track owner: Tranz Rail

The Lynx Express was a long-distance passenger train in the South Island of New Zealand that ran the length of the Main North Line between Picton and Christchurch. The service was operated by New Zealand Rail Limited business unit InterCity Rail.

== Operation ==
New Zealand Rail began The Lynx fast ferry service as part of the Interisland Line at the end of 1994, with the 74-metre Incat catamaran HSC Condor 10 being leased for that summer from Condor Ferries. It provided a faster alternative to the conventional ferries MV Aratika and Arahura.

To complement the faster ferry, a passenger train from Picton to Christchurch and return was introduced. Named the Lynx Express, it debuted on Monday, 19 December 1994 and unlike the Coastal Pacific it ran beyond Picton railway station to and from the ferry terminal. The Coastal Pacific Express connecting with the conventional ferries ran from Christchurch to Picton and back.

Two cars from the original Southerner later used on the Northerner were rebuilt to the same specification as the new TranzAlpine cars. They each seated 50 passengers in seats designed for the Wairarapa Connection and Northerner/Overlander, featuring alcove-style seating with tables along with panoramic windows and air conditioning. These cars were complemented by the then-recently refurbished former Southerner, later Northerner, and an InterCity spare buffet car with 24 seats and tables, arranged alcove style, and a Daewoo modular former Auckland suburban van converted to a power and baggage van with a new 90 kW generator.

Despite the improved accommodation on the newer train, as opposed to the Coastal Pacific, and its faster timetable with only two intermediate stops at Blenheim and Kaikōura, the service failed to attract sufficient revenue, and when the Condor 10 returned from 1995 to 1996, the service was not resumed.

== Accident ==
On 23 December 1994, just a few days after its introduction, the Picton bound Lynx Express was involved in accident at a level crossing with State Highway 1 north of Omihi. A car illegally tried to cross in front of the train and was struck, resulting in the death of one of the car’s occupants. The car’s driver and another occupant suffered serious injuries.

== See also ==
- Coastal Pacific
