= Overlander (train) =

Former long-distance passenger train in New Zealand

The Overlander
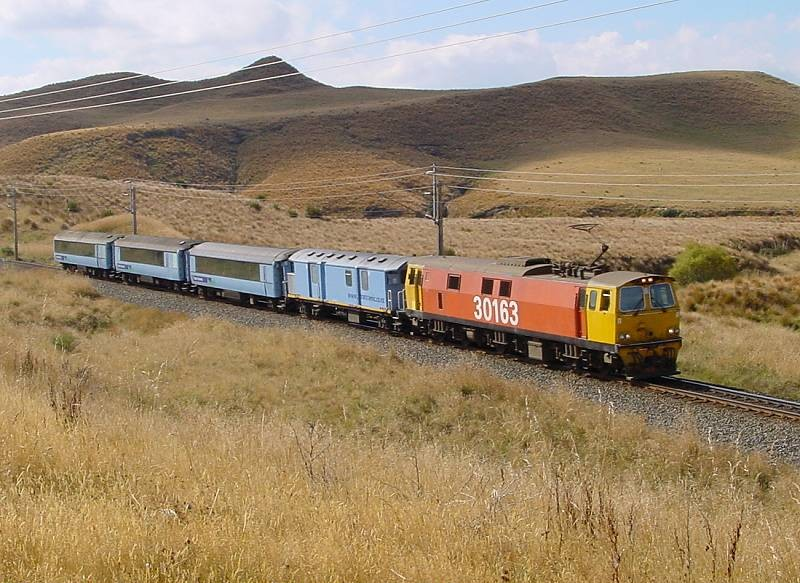
- The Overlander hauled by an EF class electric locomotive near Waiouru, central North Island.

Overview
- Service type: Inter-city rail
- Status: Discontinued, replaced by the Northern Explorer
- Locale: North Island, New Zealand
- First service: 2 December 1991
- Last service: 24 June 2012
- Current operators: InterCity, Tranz Scenic, a division of Tranz Rail, later Toll NZ and KiwiRail.
- Former operator: InterCity Rail (1991–1995)
- Ridership: 67,000 p.a. (2008–2009)

Route
- Termini: Wellington; Auckland
- Stops: 14 northbound 15 southbound
- Distance travelled: 681 km (423 mi)
- Average journey time: 12 hours
- Service frequency: Three weekly each way (May–November); Daily each way (December–April)

On-board services
- Class: Standard class only
- Disabled access: Restricted due to age of rolling stock
- Seating arrangements: Airline style, alcove, and lounger
- Catering facilities: On-board café 30-minute lunch stop at National Park
- Observation facilities: Large windows in all carriages Large rear window in rear carriage
- Baggage facilities: Overhead racks Baggage carriage

Technical
- Rolling stock: 56-foot carriages DC Class diesel locomotives EF class electric locomotives.
- Track gauge: 3 ft 6 in (1,067 mm)

The Overlander was a long-distance rail passenger train between Auckland and Wellington in the North Island of New Zealand, along the North Island Main Trunk (NIMT). It was operated by Tranz Scenic. The service was replaced from Sunday 24 June 2012, by the Northern Explorer.

The Overlander replaced a previous service operated by RM class Silver Fern railcars on Monday 2 December 1991. Following the withdrawal of the overnight Northerner, it was the only regular passenger train on the NIMT between Pukekohe and Palmerston North. After being threatened with cessation itself in 2006, it gained significantly in popularity, partly because of increased tourism promotion for the service.

It was called one of the best-value scenic rail trips in the world by the British Guardian. It is also acknowledged as one of the world's classic scenic rail journeys.

== History ==
=== Origins ===
The first regular daylight Wellington-Auckland passenger train services, augmenting the older overnight services, were the steam-hauled Daylight Limited and diesel-hauled Scenic Daylight that ran primarily during summer months and Easter holiday period for many years from the 1920s onwards. The arrival of the Blue Streak and later Silver Fern railcars saw an end for a time to regular carriage trains, except when the Silver Fern railcars were replaced by carriage trains.

=== Proposed cessation ===
On 25 July 2006, it was announced that the service would be withdrawn at the end of September as it had made a loss for some time. The last trains were scheduled to run on Saturday 30 September 2006.

On 18 August 2006, the Green Party announced a Save the Overlander campaign, which received a positive response, primarily from the small towns along the train's route.

On 28 September 2006, three days before the service was due to end, Toll announced that it would continue on a schedule reduced from daily year-round to Fridays, Saturdays, and Sundays in the off-peak winter season, and daily in the peak summer and Easter period.

=== New life ===
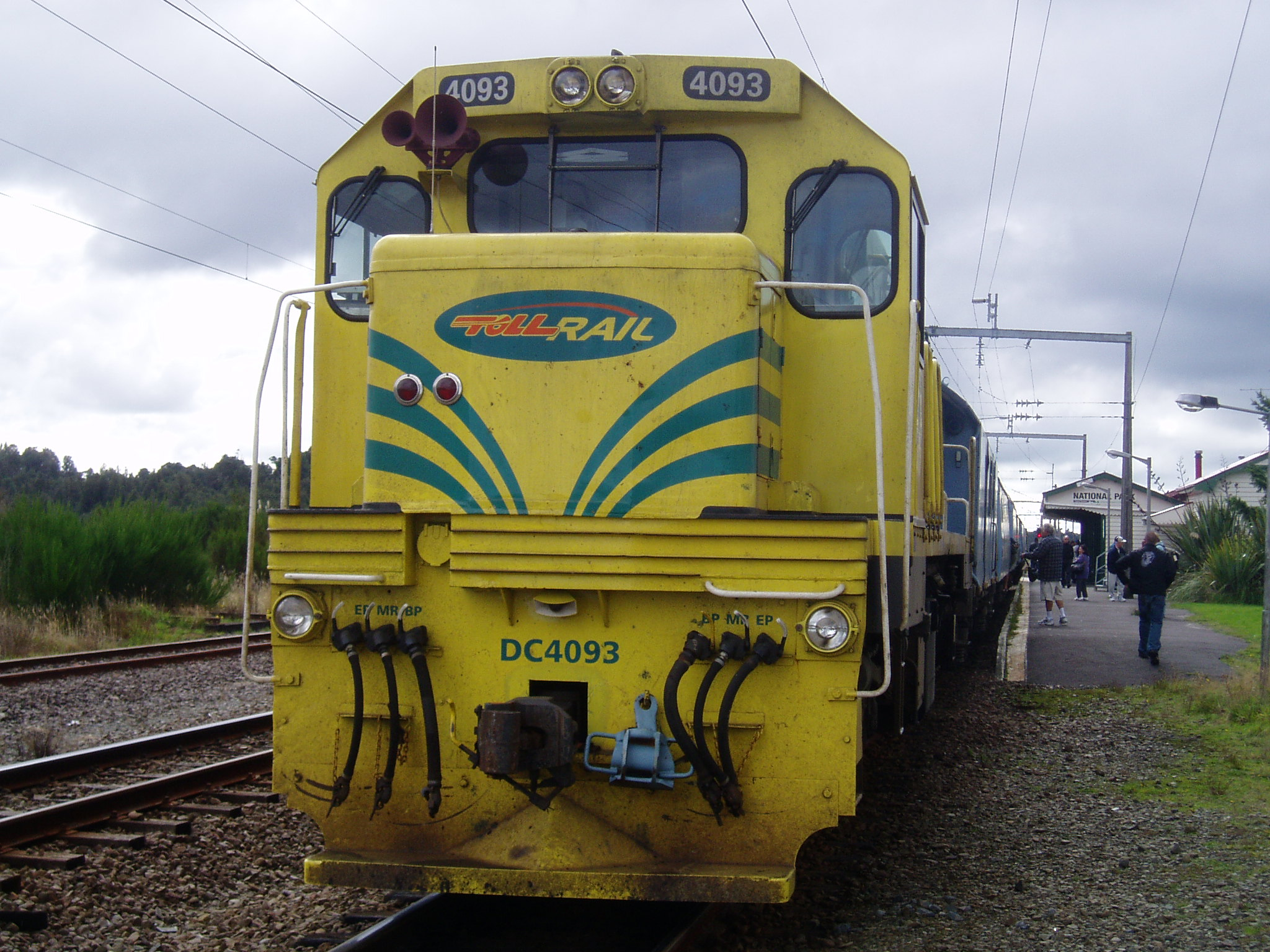
DC class locomotive 4093 on the Overlander at National Park.

The Overlander's reprieve saw an interim refurbishment programme implemented, both internally and externally. Externally, the three former Bay Express cars and seven existing Overlander cars retained the Cato blue paint scheme of the Tranz Rail era, but with the new "Overlander" promotional logo introduced by Toll Rail on the sides in large white letters. Also, structural repair work was carried out. Internally, the cars were tidied up and seats replaced or reupholstered in some cars, new carpet laid in others.

In 2008, the train was again close to capacity in usage of its just over 160 seats, and it was mooted that daily services be reestablished. After the New Zealand government re-purchased the rail services in 2008 and renamed them KiwiRail, a rail upgrade budget was also announced that included funds for refurbishing the trains.

In mid-2009, it was announced that patronage had steadily increased and that the service was thriving with 25.5% more passengers over the previous year, and that additional carriages had been added to the train in some cases to satisfy demand. KiwiRail also announced that as a result, services would be extended to daily during the July school holidays, and the general peak season timetable extended to more than seven months each year. The service then became seven days a week from September through to May, with the winter off peak May to September being Friday, Saturday and Sunday.

Due to increased interest and passenger demand, the town of Taihape was reinstated in October 2009 as a stop on the Overlander, following the local "Stop the Train" co-operative petition, headed by the Taihape Community Development Trust, Taihape Community Board, and the Older and Bolder Groups. Today with the Northern Explorer service, Taihape is no longer a stop.

=== Re-branding as the Northern Explorer ===
In June 2012, passenger numbers were again in decline. KiwiRail decided to replace the Overlander with a new service, the Northern Explorer, from Monday, 25 June 2012.

== Rolling stock ==
The Overlander was usually hauled by DC or EF locomotives with NZR 56-foot carriages.

Originally the service was operated with six Northerner cars (originally single lavatory first class cars, later designated South Island Main Trunk first class cars, refurbished for the original Southerner Expresses of 1970), the Bay Express servery/observation/rear-view car, and what was once both The Connoisseur car and TranzAlpine rear-view/observation car and the two Northerner modular handbrake end-mounted 11 kW generator FM -class power-luggage vans, painted in the dark blue InterCity logo with a 220 mm white stripe sandwiching a 100 mm red band, minus the parcels traffic. In December 1991 another modular van was refitted with a generator, and a Wairarapa Connection car with 32 seats to a newer design arranged alcove-style and a servery to facilitate the introduction of a third trainset for maintenance requirements, the third set thus becoming a spare.

=== Extra Carriages ===
The former Vice-Regal (Governor-General) car turned Southerner full buffet car was refitted in 1993 and returned to the NIMT with 24 seats to a newer design arranged alcove style and a short buffet counter to replace the full-length counter and 20 bar stools.

A new "no-frills" fare was introduced, using the remaining six Northerner carriages, a Southerner carriage and two Auckland excursion carriages between 1995 and 2002. With the cancellation of the Bay Express in October 2001, the three panorama carriages from that train were utilised as a fourth set for the NIMT.

=== Re-equipping ===
From December 1991 to December 1994, nine ex second class passenger coaches built between 1937 and 1945 (one the former TranzAlpine rear-view observation car, one a Southerner car, two from Auckland excursion, three from Auckland suburban and two from Wairarapa commuter services) were extensively refurbished similar to the successful "big window" panorama cars used on the TranzAlpine, Coastal Pacific and pressure-ventilated Bay Express cars and made into three 3-car/1-van sets for "new" Overlander/Northerner services, each including a coach with a servery bar where hot food, snacks and beverages can be bought during the trip, a rear view observation car and a 49-seat day car. All nine cars were fully air-conditioned.

=== Vans ===
Three modular vans, one from the Telecom train, one from the Sesqui 1990 and one from the Bay Express trains were refitted to newer designs, all incorporating new-style 90 kW generators for increased on-train requirements, as power-luggage vans. An Auckland suburban van, the other of two Bay Express vans and the second of two Northerner vans were similarly refitted to serve this train.

=== Double duty ===
As the Overlander and Northerner shared rolling stock, substantially better carriage utilisation was achieved, compared to having two train sets sitting unused for over 12 hours a day.

On Wednesday 16 August 2006, the first air-conditioned 42-seat rear-view Northerner/Overlander car and its air-conditioned 49-seat day car running mate, were taken to Hutt Workshops and stored, their bogies went under the ex-British Rail cars for the Wairarapa Connection.

== Former passenger stops ==
Station	Southbound times 1995	Northbound times 1995	Notes
Auckland	08:50	18:45	
Papakura	09:20	18:13	
Pukekohe	09:34	17:55	
Te Kauwhata			discontinued April 2005
Huntly	10:18	17:14	discontinued April 2005
Hamilton	10:48	16:48	
Te Awamutu	11:07	16:25	discontinued April 2005
Otorohanga	11:26	16:05	
Te Kūiti	11:42	15:48	
Taumarunui	13:00	14:32	
Manunui			
Piriaka			
Kakahi			steam engine turning point.
Ōwhango			
Oio			
Raurimu			below the Raurimu Spiral
National Park	14:05	13:30	pre 1980s/Overlander
Ohakune	14:28	13:07	
Waiouru	14:50	12:46	the highest station on the line (discontinued April 2005)
Taihape	15:35	12:01	previously had a dining room, and engines were changed (discontinued April 2005, reinstated October 2009)
Marton	16:28	11:08	
Feilding	16:51	10:45	
Palmerston North	17:10	10:30	
Levin	17:44	09:53	
Otaki	18:03	09:33	discontinued April 2005
Waikanae			discontinued April 2005
Paraparaumu	18:25	09:14	
Porirua	18:54	08:40	southbound trains stop, northbound trains no longer stop (date unknown)
Wellington	19:12	08:20	
