= The Connoisseur car =

Special railway carriages used New Zealand

The Connoisseur cars were special railway carriages that were used in a number of passenger trains in New Zealand.

== History ==
In 1987, a private tourist firm, Globetrotter Tours New Zealand Ltd leased a New Zealand Railways Corporation single lavatory first-class NZR 56-foot carriage, utilised on the South Island Main Trunk Main South Line's Southerner express passenger trains for private use as a luxury tourist alternative to the rail services then offered by InterCity Rail.

Originally, the car was named the Connoisseur's Express carriage, and the aim was to attract more wealthy patrons back to rail travel in the South Island. It offered a higher level of service, including public address announcements about key features along the route, pre-packaged meals and refreshments brought to your seat, complimentary newspaper, and a "cabin attendant". It seated 45 passengers in a type of seat designed by staff from Christchurch's Addington Workshops. Unfortunately, in its initial guise, the service proved unpopular; passengers complained about the carriage's condition, age, riding quality, the standard one-way fare being more expensive than the ordinary InterCity return between Christchurch and Picton and lateness of the services it was towed behind.

From Monday, January 19, 1987, the car was hauled behind the-then Picton Express later Coastal Pacific. Later, the service was opened up to the Greymouth or West Coast Expresses on Sunday, March 1, that same year. Later, the Main South Line of the SIMT was included in the itinerary. The car continued to alternate between the Midland Line, Main North Line, and Main South Line, but was later limited to the Picton and Greymouth runs, and finally the Greymouth return service only.

== Refurbishment ==
In September 1988, New Zealand Railways' InterCity division were called upon to completely rebuild and refurbish the car. From an Endeavour carriage, 32 1950s-built former three-position reclining first-class seats were installed, albeit modified and reupholstered with a material cloth as opposed to leather, and sheepskin wool seat covers added. In addition to the cabin attendant, meals, public address system and complimentary refreshments and newspapers, other features included a new type of window that would later become standard throughout the entire long-distance carriage fleet, nicknamed a "panorama" or "big" window; a 4-track stereo system with headphones, an improved pressure ventilation system, noise and temperature control and at-seat service. The "coupe" compartment for hostesses was retained but rebuilt for kitchen facilities. A new livery was introduced with a grey colour and maroon bands, with the words "The Connoisseur" in a stylised font and two globes that were representations of Earth, one at either end of the fonts.

== Replacement ==
In 1991, after less than four years in service, the car was replaced by a former Endeavour carriage, with InterCity having taken the carriage and its operation back from Globetrotter. This new car was totally rebuilt and fitted with a new pressure ventilation system, a storage area for both hot and cold foods and beverages, big windows and a new end observation lounge area, complete with rear-view window and associated lounge, exactly like the rear-view and servery car of the Bay Express. Like its predecessor, this car had a hostess dedicated solely to it. Unlike the first Connoisseur, this Connoisseurs' car bore the standard InterCity livery of dark blue with 220mm thick stripe and 100mm red band inside. Thirty-nine "Addington" seats were installed and arranged in bays of four across tables, alcove-style. The seats were reupholstered, included more plush sheepskin wool coverings and were modified to increase comfort. The car was dedicated solely to the TranzAlpine and, although probably the most improved upon of all The Connoisseur services, the product in this third form was even shorter-lived.

== Demise ==
The initial Connoisseur car was thoroughly rebuilt in a fashion similar to the regular InterCity big window cars, with a replacement of the windows either side of the coupe area as they did not conform to the standard big window measurements, 51 Addington seats arranged in bays of four, across tables, alcove-style, to replace the previous 32 seats, plus an improved Pressure Ventilation system and associated ceiling trunking, "new" bogies and removal of the "kitchenette"/coupe to facilitate the increase in seating space among other detail improvements. The same year of the introduction of the second Connoisseur car, this newer vehicle was taken north for interim use on the North Island Main Trunk (NIMT)'s "new" Overlander daylight passenger services, made up of existing Northerner rolling stock and allow for the relocation of the Silver Fern railcars to other services. The carriage never returned to duty as The Connoisseur carriage on the TranzAlpine Express. In 1993, it was refitted with 39 seats to a newer design and arranged in a forward-facing format for the NIMT. And, in late 1994, the carriage was totally rebuilt as an air-conditioned rear-view carriage, similar to the other two on the NIMT as part of the Northerner and Overlander consists, seating 42, forward-facing, in seats of an even more recent design.
