= Northerner (train) =

Former passenger service in New Zealand

Northerner (Train)
Overview
- Service type: Inter-city rail
- Status: Discontinued
- Locale: North Island, New Zealand
- First service: Monday, 3 November 1975
- Last service: Friday, 12 November 2004
- Former operators: InterCity Rail; Tranz Scenic, a division of Tranz Rail, later Toll NZ

Route
- Termini: Wellington; Auckland
- Stops: 14 northbound 15 southbound
- Distance travelled: 681 km (423 mi)
- Average journey time: 12 hours

On-board services
- Class: Standard class only
- Observation facilities: Large windows in all carriages Large rear window in rear carriage
- Baggage facilities: Overhead racks Baggage carriage

Technical
- Rolling stock: 56-foot carriages DC Class diesel locomotives EF class electric locomotives.

The Northerner was an overnight passenger train between Wellington and Auckland in New Zealand. The train replaced the unnamed and ordinary express trains supplementing the luxury Silver Star, which had replaced the Night Limited in September 1971. The Northerner operated from Monday 3 November 1975 to Friday 12 November 2004.

== History ==
Overnight services between Auckland and Wellington began in 1908 when the line between the two cities was completed. The inaugural trip took Prime Minister Sir Joseph Ward and other Members of Parliament to Auckland to greet the American Pacific Fleet.

In March 1973 the Minister of Railways Tom McGuigan announced a new train would be introduced to replace the unnamed nightly service.

In 1976 the Northerner stopped at Wellington, Porirua, Paekakariki, Paraparaumu, Ōtaki, Levin, Palmerston North, Feilding, Marton, Hunterville, Taihape, Waiouru, Ohakune, National Park, Taumarunui, Mangapehi, Te Kuiti, Otorohanga, Te Awamutu, Hamilton, Huntly, Pukekohe, Papakura, Ōtāhuhu and Auckland.

== Motive power ==
Prior to Monday 3 November 1975, the pre-Northerner services were hauled by D^{A} class diesel-electric locomotives. With the introduction of the Northerner branding, D^{X} class locomotives were assigned to the train's haulage. From the 1990s onwards, DF class locomotives were used infrequently, and, on a more permanent basis DC class locomotives were used.

== Rolling stock ==
Originally numbered 227 southbound and 626 northbound, the train used extensively refurbished NZR 56-foot carriages that dated from 1937 to 1940. Ten carriages were built as two-lavatory 31-seat first-class carriages, later designated North Island Main Trunk first-class carriages, for expresses on this route, two (with staff and hostess compartments retained and augmented) as the South Island Main Trunk Main South Line single-lavatory 29 seat equivalent, along with four 16-berth sleeping carriages. In their refurbished form, the day carriages seated 30 in the same type of "bucket" seat and the day cars with staff compartments seated 25. The sleeping carriages still each accommodated 16 (2 berths in 8 cabins). In 1973 larger train sets were planned with the fitting of 20 first-class and sleeping carriages with heaters. The final fit-out of the train was not approved until November 1974 with instructions to complete the rebuild of the minimum rolling stock for the introduction of the express replacement within 12 months.

Three dining carriages were created from 1960s built 60-foot (18.288 m) long aluminium-sheathed Railway Travelling Post Office vans. These vehicles each seated 40 in tip-up bench type seats, each for two persons, arranged in bays of four, alcove style, across tables. Larger kitchens were built due to the extra length provided by these vehicles.

Three matching 56-foot (17.07 m) guard's vans were also heavily overhauled and, due to their role as luggage vans, were fitted with Japanese Kinki-Sharyo manufactured bogies, classed X27250 by NZR, out from under the three 60 ft (18 m) postal vans, these bogies being of a more modern design than those undercarriages at the time and suited for heavier stock.

Four 1960s built 50-foot (15.24 m) steam-heating vans (with the same base design and bogies as the postal vans) built to facilitate heating the carriages of both the Night Limited's and ordinary expresses when diesel-electric locomotives displaced steam locomotives on the NIMT, three 50 ft (15.24 m) wooden box wagons turned postal vans, five more turned parcels vans and four more steel box wagons turned parcel vans completed the consist. The eight parcel vehicles were replaced by 15 box wagons of a more modern design turned parcels vans in the 1980s.

The Northerner was the first of the substantially overhauled carriage trains to be fitted with a new type of bogie of Korean manufacture, which offered a superior quality ride to its Timken-built predecessors, classed X25330. The new bogies, classed X28020 by NZR, were based on the Kinki bogies as well as bogies, classed X28250 by NZR, used underneath the Silver Star carriages. Substantial work was carried out on all 19 carriages underframes to facilitate the 38 bogies' placement underneath. The underframes were raised to make easier the fitting of the newer bogies, and drawgear lowered the same distance.

Following a government decision that operating subsidies for long-distance passenger trains would cease, Sunday 26 April 1987 saw dining cars, sleeping cars, nearly 100 jobs and $4 million in operating costs removed from this service and until Sunday 20 March 1988, the train offered biscuits and fruit juice served from the guards van.

The train was re-equipped with 8 Southerner carriages (former Main South Line first-class carriages) and two former FM class guards vans of a modular design, one from Mitsubishi, the other from Daewoo, turned into power-luggage vans with handbrake end-mounted 11 kW generators. The Northerner service seated 53 or 45 per carriage to compensate for reduced carriages in reclining road coach-style seats as opposed to 30 or 25. From its inception, it also included in the two catering carriages and, in 1992, in the two 37-seat carriages to retain their coupe compartments when three trainsets were made available, video entertainment, comprising a large screen GoldStar television at one edge of the carriage showing movies with the sound piped throughout the carriage. The 15 parcels wagons remained dedicated to the service until 1991, when Speedlink Parcels was sold to New Zealand Post, some still bearing the old yellow Northerner livery.

Sunday 15 April 1991, saw two full buffet carriages, both from the original Southerner, one being prior to that a 56-foot (17.07 m) kitchen and dining car to the North Island 55-foot (16.76 m) Vice-Regal carriage for the Governor-General of the day, returned to the train as part of an attempt to attract more patronage, along with a faster timetable and reduced seating (41-43 or 37 per carriage) to give passengers more legroom and line seats up with windows. This coincided with one carriage and one catering carriage leaving the Northerner to join the new Capital Connection service.

=== New livery ===
The new Northerner also bore the new InterCity dark blue livery with horizontal full-length 220 mm (8.66 in) white stripe and 100 mm (3.94 in) red band inside, with the name InterCity in the red band. In 1991, the red band was replaced by a yellow 100 mm (3.94 in) band, to facilitate the transfer of rail services from the New Zealand Railways Corporation to New Zealand Rail Limited. In 1993, as panorama carriages entered the night-time run, a 100 mm (3.94 in) green band replaced the yellow one on carriage sides. When New Zealand Rail was renamed Tranz Rail a new light blue 350 mm (13.78 in) stripe bearing the Tranz Scenic logo appeared on the carriages until the stripe and the retained dark blue livery was replaced by an overall light blue paint scheme in 1999. The Tranz Scenic logo remained.

=== Temporary Silver Fern replacement ===
RM class Silver Fern railcars were employed to operate the daytime equivalent of the Northerner, and when one derailed on 24 January 1989, a replacement carriage train was established as a temporary replacement. Two Northerner carriages, along with the Railfreight Systems business carriage (originally a Northerner dining carriage), and the first of three modular vans utilised on the reinstated Endeavour now fitted with 11 kW end-mounted generator and painted InterCity blue to match, were assembled into what was the second incarnation of the Blue Fern. This train would be re-activated again after derailments on 15 November 1990 and 11 January 1991, also involving Silver Fern railcars.

=== Permanent Silver Fern replacement ===
On Monday 2 December 1991 the Silver Fern railcarriages were replaced on the daylight NIMT run by the Northerner stock, InterCity having learned from the benefits a carriage train provided over the three 96-seat railcars. To facilitate this, a third modular van fitted with 11 kW generator for power-luggage use and a Wairarapa Connection carriage turned 32-seat servery carriage were made available to form a third trainset. Also, the servery/observation/rearview Bay Express carriage and the observation/rearview TranzAlpine Connoisseurs carriage were added to provide extra viewing opportunities. The daylight services were named the Overlander Expresses.

During the transition period, the former Vice-Regal carriage turned Southerner buffet carriage was refitted in 1993 with shorter buffet counter and 24 seats of the type designed by Addington Workshops, arranged alcove-style to replace the long counter and 20 associated stools and was returned to the NIMT. Also, the TranzAlpine rear-view carriage had seats and tables removed, replaced by 39 seats of the same design as the refurbished Wairarapa carriage, arranged forward-facing.

=== Air conditioning and panorama windows upgrade ===
From Tuesday 26 January Friday 3 and 17 December and Sunday 19 December 1993 until December 1994, one carriage from the Southerner (1988–1995), two carriages from the Wairarapa Connection, two from the Auckland excursion fleet, three from Auckland suburban services and the TranzAlpine rearview carriage were extensively rebuilt to form three three-carriage air-conditioned panorama train sets similar to the successful "big window" TranzAlpine, Coastal Pacific and pressure-ventilated Bay Expresses to serve both the day-time Overlander and night-time Northerner runs. Modular vans from the Bay Express, the New Zealand Sesquicentennial 1990 display train, and the Telecom New Zealand trains were refitted to match, with new 90 kW generators for increased facilities on board. In 1994, the second of the two Bay Express vans and an Auckland suburban van were similarly fitted, while in 1997, one of the first two modular Northerner power/baggage vans returned, but with a 90 kW generator.

=== No frills carriages ===
A new "no-frills" concept was introduced, offering cheaper fares and using six former Northerner carriages, and later still, a Southerner carriage and two refitted Auckland excursion fleet cars at different times, as, progressively, the Northerner stock were rebuilt or withdrawn. In 1999, the former Southerner carriage and the two ex-excursion fleet carriages were air-conditioned.

Later on, the 1997 refitted Bay Express servery/observation/rearview carriage and its two "new" running mates, refitted 1995, were added when the Napier return service was cancelled in October 2001.

The first exclusive NIMT rearview carriage and its matching full-length day carriage are withdrawn, and as of 17 April 2009, were still stored at Hutt Railway Workshops, along with the second of the original two TranzAlpine and TranzCoastal servery observation carriages, as the Overlander continues with its other six carriages and the three Bay Express carriages. From time to time over the last few years, the Corporate Business carriages (formerly the first and third of three original Northerner dining carriages) were also used.

== See also ==
- The Overlander
