= Coastal Pacific =

Passenger train in New Zealand

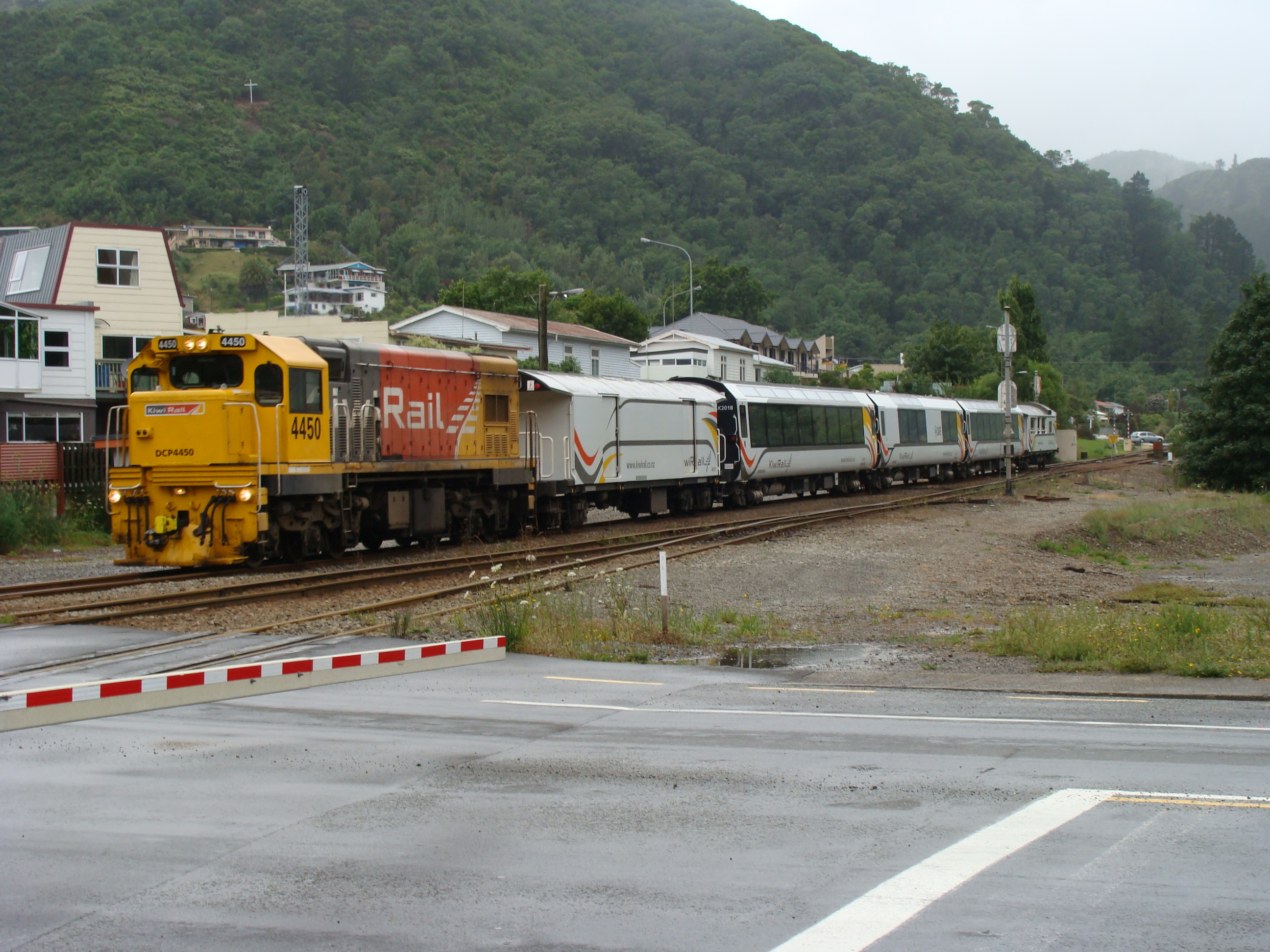
- A northbound Coastal Pacific train in Picton

Overview
- Service type: Inter-city rail
- Status: Current
- Locale: Upper South Island, New Zealand
- First service: 25 September 1988
- Current operator: Great Journeys New Zealand (2017–present)
- Former operators: InterCity Rail (1988–1995); Tranz Scenic (1995–2012); KiwiRail Scenic Journeys (2012–2017)

Route
- Termini: Christchurch; Picton
- Stops: 5
- Distance travelled: 348 km (216 mi)
- Average journey time: 5 hours
- Service frequency: Tuesday, Wednesday, October - April

On-board services
- Classes: Scenic Class, Scenic Plus Class
- Disabled access: Wheelchair hoist in café car
- Seating arrangements: Airline-style; Alcove with table
- Catering facilities: On-board café
- Observation facilities: Large windows in all carriages Open-air viewing carriage
- Baggage facilities: Overhead shelves Baggage carriage
- Other facilities: Toilets

Technical
- Rolling stock: DXR locomotives AK class carriages
- Track gauge: 1,067 mm (3 ft 6 in)
- Operating speed: 66 km/h (41 mph) average

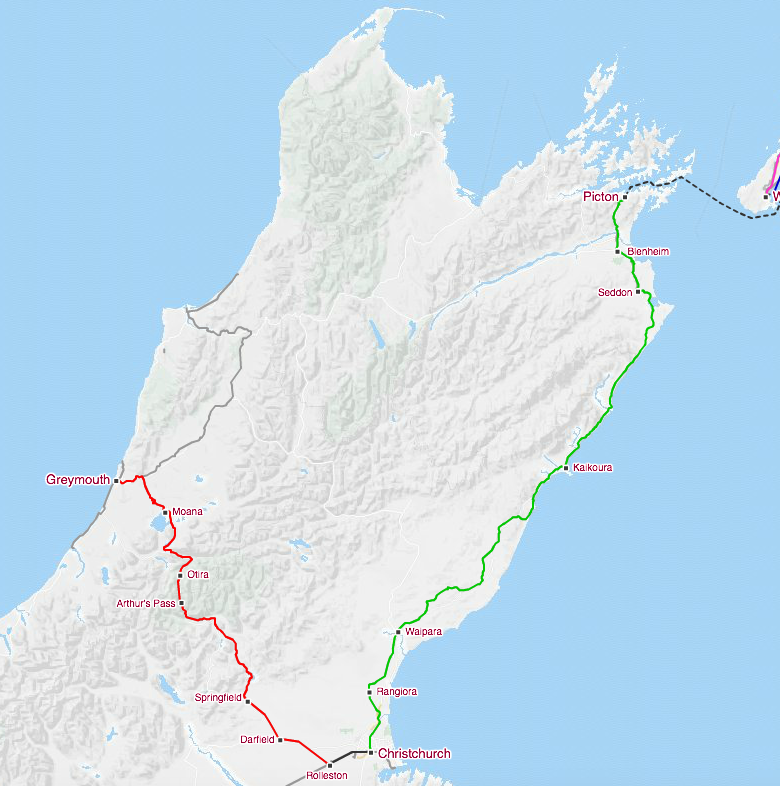
KiwiRail passenger trains in the South Island, Coastal Pacific in 2021

The Coastal Pacific is a long-distance passenger train that runs between Picton and Christchurch in the South Island of New Zealand. It is operated by the Great Journeys New Zealand division of KiwiRail. It was called the TranzCoastal from 23 May 2000 until temporarily withdrawn on 15 August 2011. It was the first train to use the new AK class carriages.

The service was suspended after 14 November 2016 due to damage to the rail line from the 2016 Kaikōura earthquake, but in 2018-19, ran from Saturday 1 December to Sunday 28 April. In November 2018, Prime Minister Jacinda Ardern announced $40 million for KiwiRail from the Provincial Growth Fund, to provide year-round service and to upgrade the Kaikoura, Blenheim and Picton stations.

The service was again suspended on 23 March 2020 due to COVID-19 restrictions.

The Coastal Pacific long distance passenger service was suspended once more in December 2021. There were plans to replace it with a multi-day rail tour. On 12 April 2022 it was announced trains would resume again from 29 September 2022, as same-day services, on Thursdays to Sundays and daily between 2 February and 30 April 2023. It then next runs on 21 September 2023.

== History ==
In September 1988 the Railways Corporation announced it was replacing the Picton Express train from Christchurch to Picton with a new train along the lines of the successful TranzAlpine between Christchurch and Greymouth launched in November 1987.

On 25 September 1988, the train was re-launched as the "Coastal Pacific Express." The new train eliminated the previous refreshment stop at Kaikōura and included a servery for refreshments.

In April 2006, Toll NZ announced its intention to sell the TranzCoastal and the TranzAlpine. However, with the purchase of Toll NZ's rail assets in 2008 by the government, these plans never came to fruition. KiwiRail has upgraded the remaining three long-distance passenger services.

Following the 6.3 magnitude earthquake that struck Canterbury on 22 February 2011, KiwiRail suspended the train, replacing it with a bus service until 10 April 2011. They announced that it would return on 15 August 2011 under its original name, the Coastal Pacific. Since 2013 the train has been run as a seasonal service, serving the peak tourist season between about September to April, with no services in the winter months, to offset operating losses.

The 7.8 magnitude North Canterbury earthquake on 14 November 2016 caused numerous landslides that destroyed parts of the railway line in the Kaikōura district. KiwiRail suspended the train service, which had been due to operate until May 2017, for the rest of the 2016–17 season. It was announced on 1 August 2018 that the service would resume on 1 December.

As of 31 August 2022, the Coastal Pacific has suspended same day passenger operations between Picton and Christchurch. These services are planned to return on 29 September.

=== Incidents ===
One of New Zealand Rail's most controversial safety incidents happened in 1994 when 6-year-old Morgan Jones fell under an observation carriage on the Coastal Pacific, after a handrail he was holding onto suddenly fell off. Although Jones survived the accident, he was left blind and had a leg amputated.

== Route and stations ==
The train runs daily between Christchurch and Picton, stopping at Rangiora, Kaikōura, and Blenheim along the Main North Line. It was introduced on Sunday, 25 September 1988 and takes 5 hours 20 minutes.

== Rolling stock ==
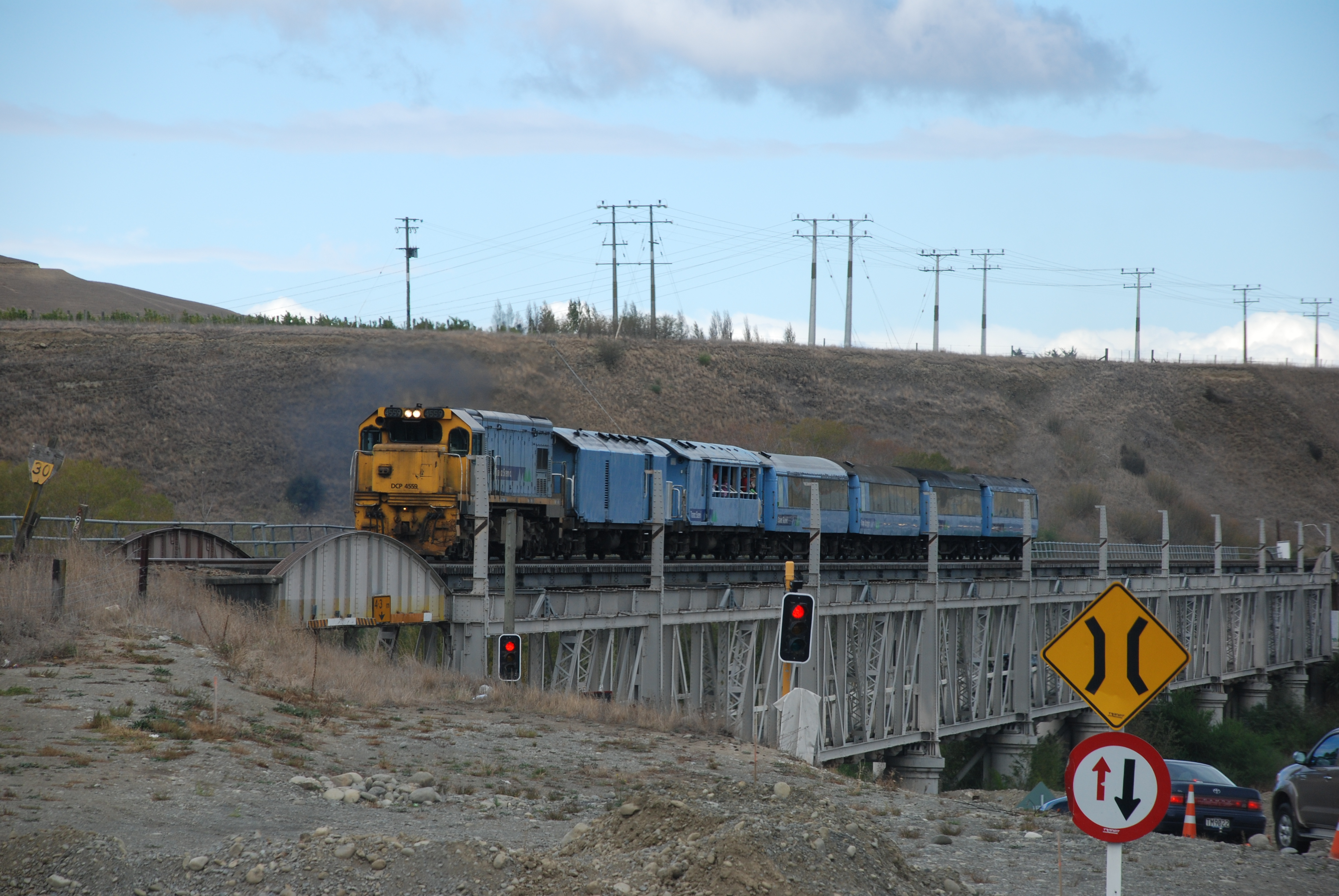
The Coastal Pacific crossing the double-decker rail and road bridge near Seddon in April 2007

The initial rolling stock for the Coastal Pacific consisted of the last three original Southerner day carriages. They were refurbished to the same design as the three AO class carriages on the TranzAlpine and the sole Connoisseur carriage. Two carriages seated 51 each in seats designed by Addington Workshops, which were reupholstered and re-arranged, alcove-style, around tables. The third carriage became a 31-seat servery and observation carriage fitted out similarly to its TranzAlpine counterpart, but with detail differences in the buffet counter area. An FM class guards van was fitted with an 11-kW petrol generator at the handbrake end for power and baggage duties.

The new Coastal Pacific became a favourite with travellers, but it did not attract the same level of popularity as the TranzAlpine. In 1993, a "backpackers" car (a former red Picton – Greymouth car with luggage space at one end) was introduced, for a cheaper option. This premise proved popular, as did adding five freight wagons authorised to travel at 100 km/h conveying priority freight for the North Island or deep South.

In the early 1990s, the carriages were equipped with pressure ventilation like the Bay Express carriages and the TranzAlpine rear observation carriage.

=== Connoisseur service ===
On 19 January 1987, a private tourism firm leased a 29 (later 45) seat single-lavatory South Island Main Trunk first-class car refurbished in 1970 for the Southerner and attached it to the Picton train initially, before expanding its operation to Greymouth and later Invercargill. It was marketed as a luxury carriage: it offered the same level of comfort as other Southerner carriages, but the service was to a higher standard. Originally named the Connoisseurs' Express carriage, it was heavily refurbished to offer superior quality service and renamed The Connoisseur carriage.

=== Rebranding and re-equipping ===
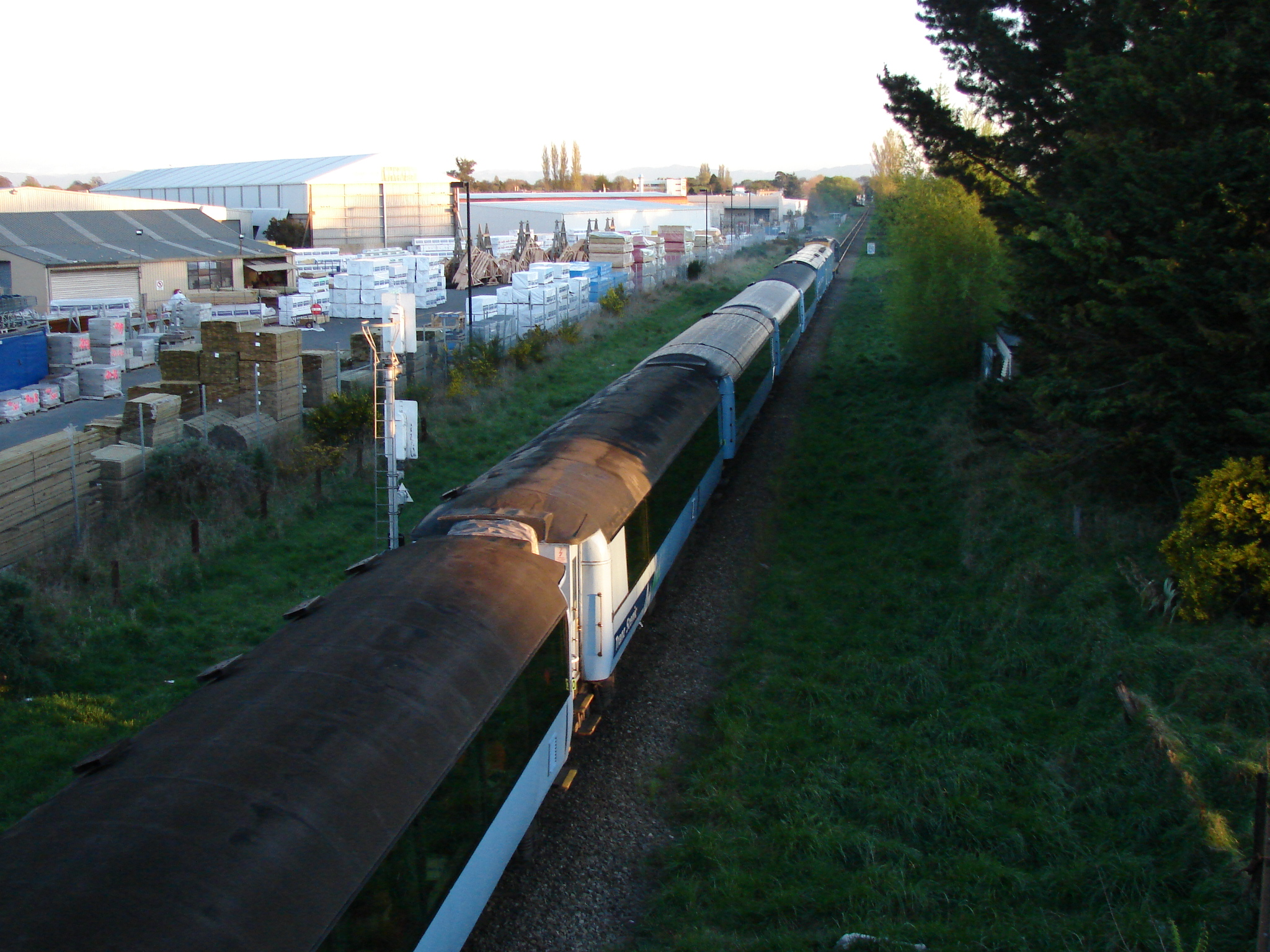
Heading north through Christchurch

During 1996, the original TranzAlpine observation carriage was thoroughly overhauled and air-conditioning installed, and this carriage, along with the two former Lynx Express carriages and the carriage with luggage space, were permanently assigned to this train.

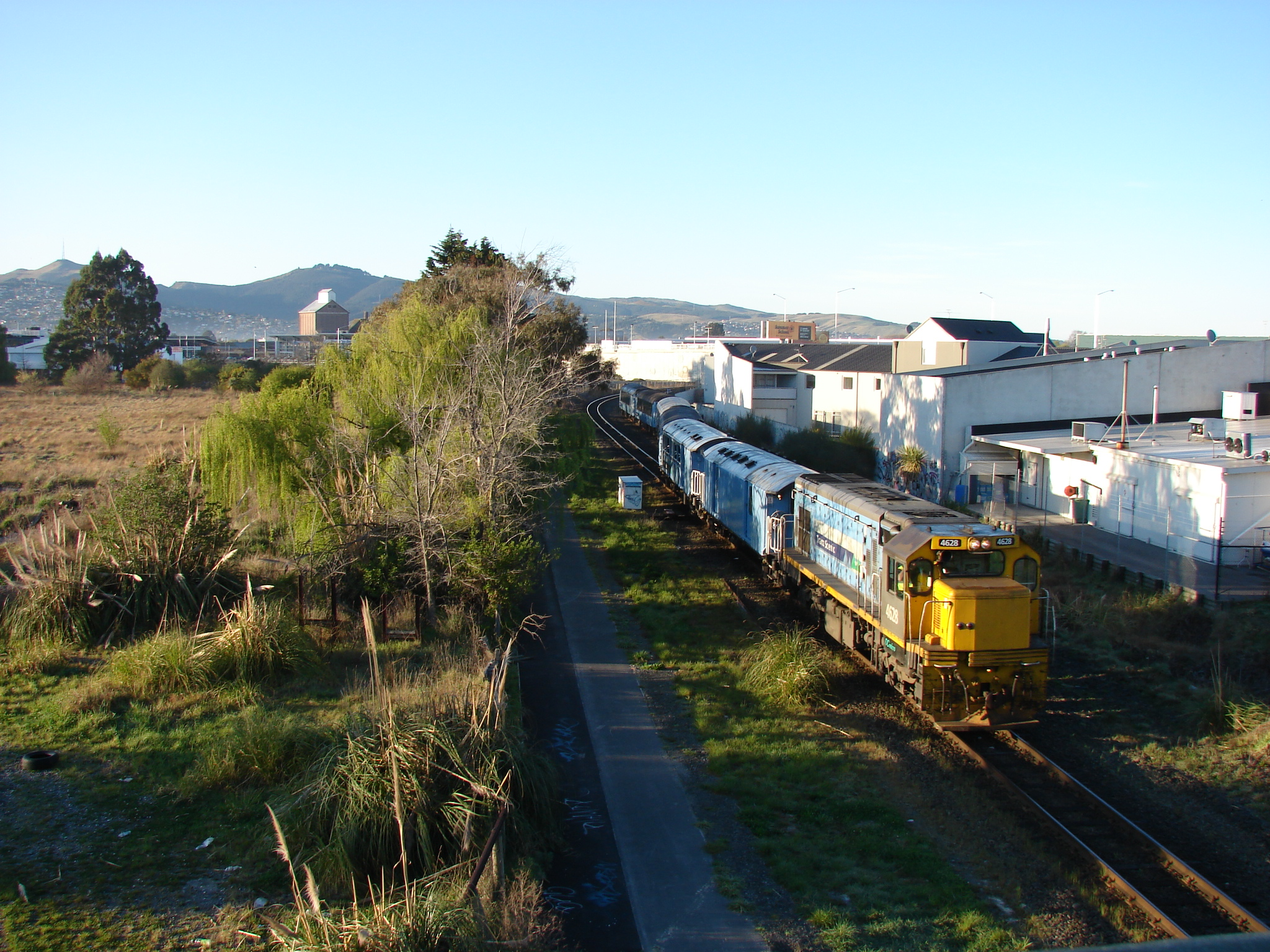
A Picton-bound Coastal Pacific departing Christchurch

The backpackers' carriage was later replaced by the only former Southerner (later Northerner) carriage to escape rebuilding as a panorama carriage or scrapping. It was fitted with 47 of the same type of Addington seat that it had had in the mid to late 1980s, all seats facing toward the two centre tables, one on both sides of the aisle of the carriage, and became the new backpackers' carriage. The former Connoisseur carriage, thoroughly refurbished the year before with air conditioning installed, assumed regular duty. The Lynx Express baggage van and later the first of the NIMT baggage vans were also allocated to this service. Later, the second backpacker carriage had air conditioning installed, and in late 2003, it was transferred north for use on the Overlander or Wairarapa Connection.

The baggage van fitted out for the initial third NIMT passenger trainset in 1992 had its central and one end module converted into an open viewing area, while the other end module remained for luggage.

=== New rolling stock ===
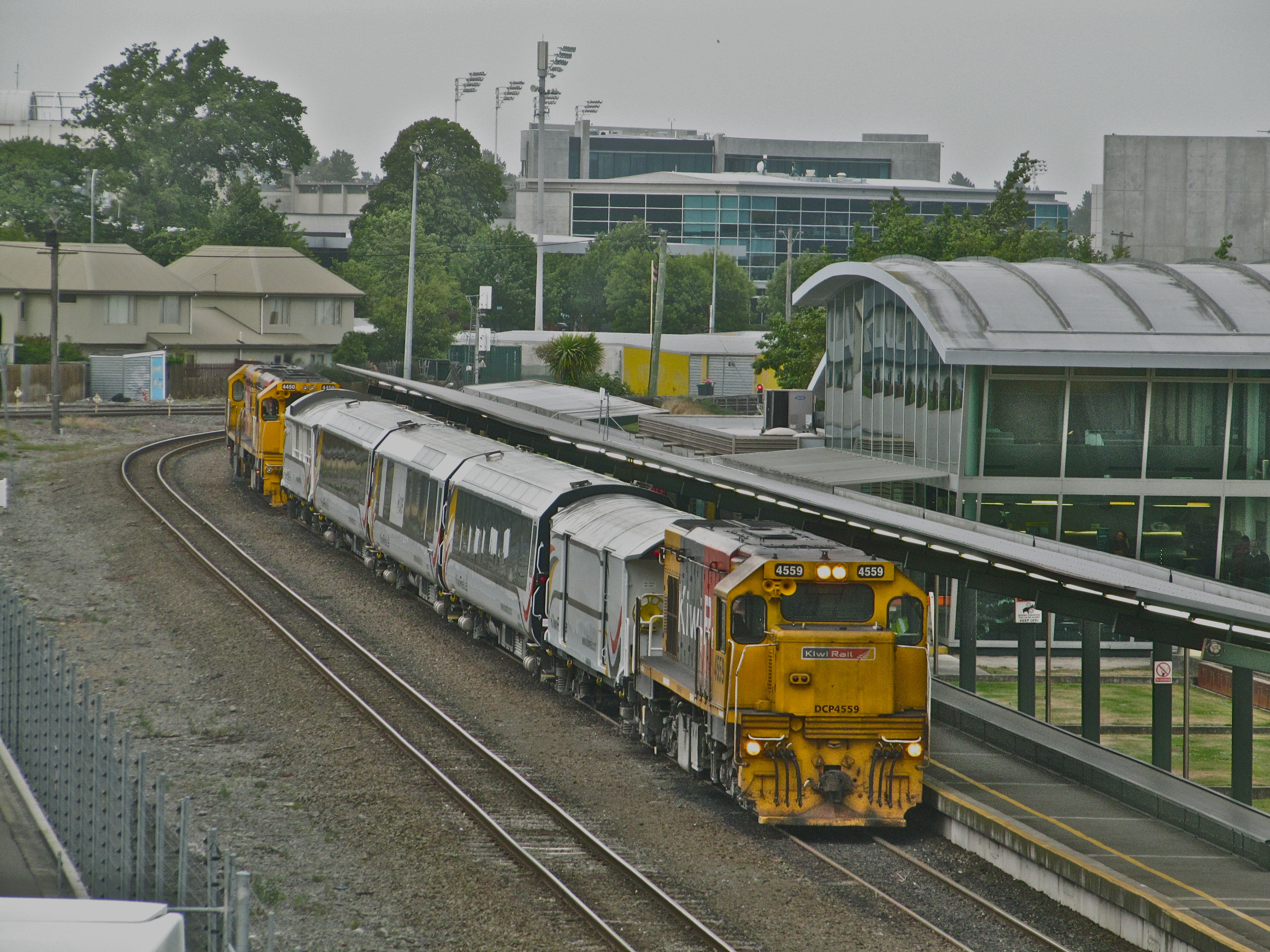
Coastal Pacific at Christchurch with new AK carriages in December 2011

KiwiRail's built new carriages for the service at Hillside Engineering, classed AK. The new carriages for the Coastal Pacific entered service toward the end of 2011.

== See also ==
- Lynx Express
- Main North Line (Picton-Christchurch)
