= Great Journeys New Zealand =

Tourism division of KiwiRail

- Formerly: KiwiRail Scenic Journeys; Tranz Scenic; InterCity Rail
- Type: Brand
- Industry: Rail transport in New Zealand
- Founded: 2017
- Headquarters: Wellington, New Zealand
- Area served: New Zealand
- Services: Long-distance passenger trains
- Parent: KiwiRail (2017–present)
- Website: www.greatjourneysnz.com

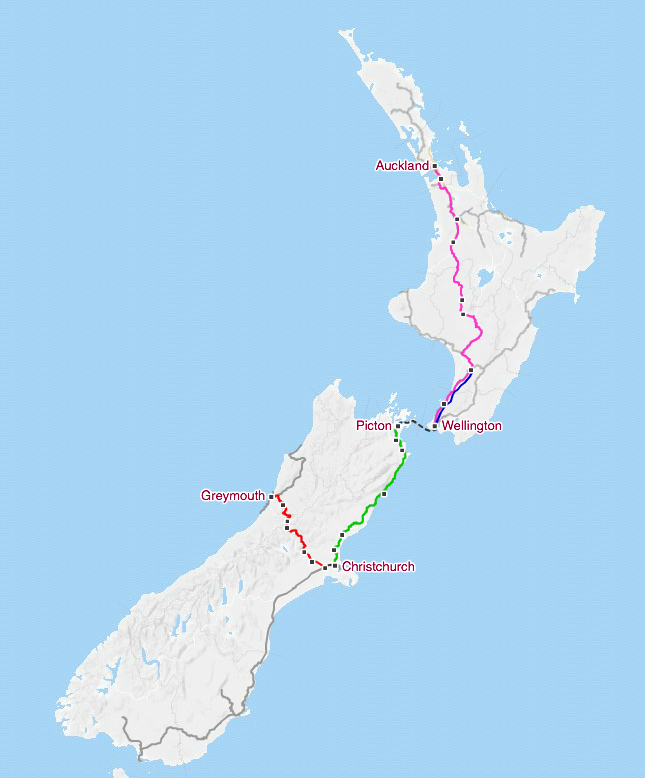
KiwiRail passenger trains Northern Explorer Capital Connection Coastal Pacific TranzAlpine

Great Journeys New Zealand is the tourism division of KiwiRail that operate its three Scenic train services (TranzAlpine, Northern Explorer and Coastal Pacific). The new division was launched in May 2017 and replaced the former tourism brand KiwiRail Scenic Journeys. It has continuity with the earlier InterCity Rail (1987–1995) and Tranz Scenic (1995–2011).

== History ==
Former logo of Tranz Scenic, 1995–2011.

Passenger trains in New Zealand were operated by the New Zealand Railways Department from 1880 to 1981, alongside private rail operators such as the Wellington and Manawatu Railway Company. The department was corporatised as the New Zealand Railways Corporation (NZRC) in 1982, and later reorganised as a state-owned enterprise in 1986. A consulting study commissioned by the NZRC and carried out by Booz Allen Hamilton recommended re-orientation of long-distance passenger services toward tourist operations.

The Fourth Labour Government passed the New Zealand Railways Corporation Restructuring Act 1990 on 28 August of that year. Two months later, on 28 October 1990, the New Zealand government removed core rail transport and shipping operations from the New Zealand Railways Corporation, creating a separate entity called New Zealand Rail Limited, a Crown Transferee company created under the Act. New Zealand Rail Limited's long-distance passenger trains carried the InterCity Rail branding. New Zealand Rail Limited was privatised and sold to a consortium named TranzRail Holdings Limited in 1993 and changed its name to Tranz Rail in October 1995. As part of the rebranding exercise, InterCity Rail was renamed Tranz Scenic.

=== Tranz Scenic (2001) Ltd ===
As part of a restructuring programme, in November 2001, Tranz Scenic was incorporated as stand-alone subsidiary Tranz Scenic (2001) Limited. Tranz Rail then sold 50% of Tranz Scenic for $33 million to Donald Gibson and Gary McDonald, who were also directors of Australian railway operator West Coast Railway. The sale included long-distance passenger rolling stock and 10 diesel locomotives of the DC class (reclassified DCP), and two EF class electric locomotives. Tranz Rail intended to sell the remaining 50% share in Tranz Scenic, but this sale never eventuated. West Coast Rail withdrew several long-distance trains that were not profitable, retaining the routes that had sufficient passenger numbers (see below).

Tranz Rail was taken over by Australian transport firm Toll Holdings in 2003. The company was renamed Toll NZ and did not retain any of the Tranz Rail directors. In July 2004, the 50% share of Tranz Scenic was purchased by Toll, as one of the West Coast Railway directors had died and the business was not performing adequately. In May 2008, the New Zealand Government agreed to buy the rail and sea transport assets of Toll NZ Limited for $665 million. The government branded the new company KiwiRail.

=== KiwiRail era ===
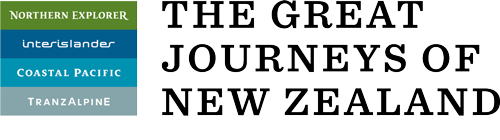
Former logo of The Great Journeys of New Zealand, 2017–2022.

In 2011, KiwiRail developed a new brand of passenger trains geared toward the increasing tourism industry in New Zealand. The new brand, named KiwiRail Scenic Journeys, was launched with new AK-class carriages designed to showcase New Zealand's scenery, as well as providing long-distance passenger train services. During the transformation, the Tranz Coastal train was rebranded as the Coastal Pacific and the Overlander became the Northern Explorer; whereas the TranzAlpine's name was retained.

In July 2012, it was revealed that KiwiRail was considering selling the remaining services. No buyers were found and the long-distance passenger services remain operated by KiwiRail Scenic Journeys.

Meanwhile, KiwiRail's ferry brand, Interislander, built on its core business taking vehicles and freight across Cook Strait and looking to promote the trip as an iconic tourism experience for a scenic alternative to flying.

In 2017, KiwiRail decided to bring its rail and ferry operations together under one brand, The Great Journeys of New Zealand, which offers a connected passenger service throughout New Zealand, from Auckland to Greymouth, via train and ferry. The division is now experiencing rapid double-digit annual growth, due to the growth of Chinese tourism to New Zealand, leading KiwiRail to announce that it may purchase eight AK-class carriages to add to the 17 purchased in 2010.

In 2021, KiwiRail announced the suspension two of its three services, the Northern Explorer and the Coastal Pacific. KiwiRail restarted the services from September 2022.

== Services ==
=== Scenic trains ===
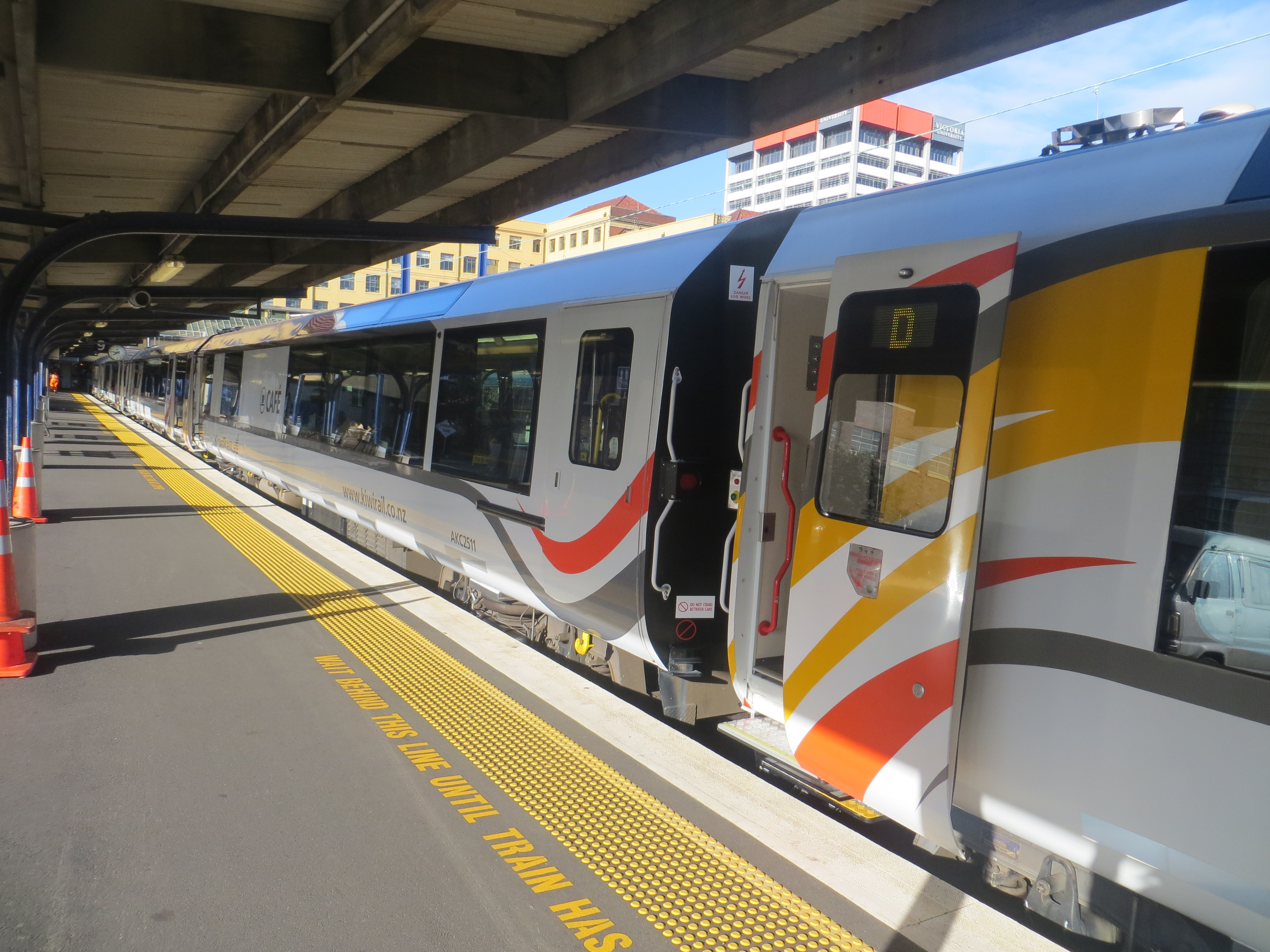
The Northern Explorer about to depart from Wellington railway station with new AK class carriages.

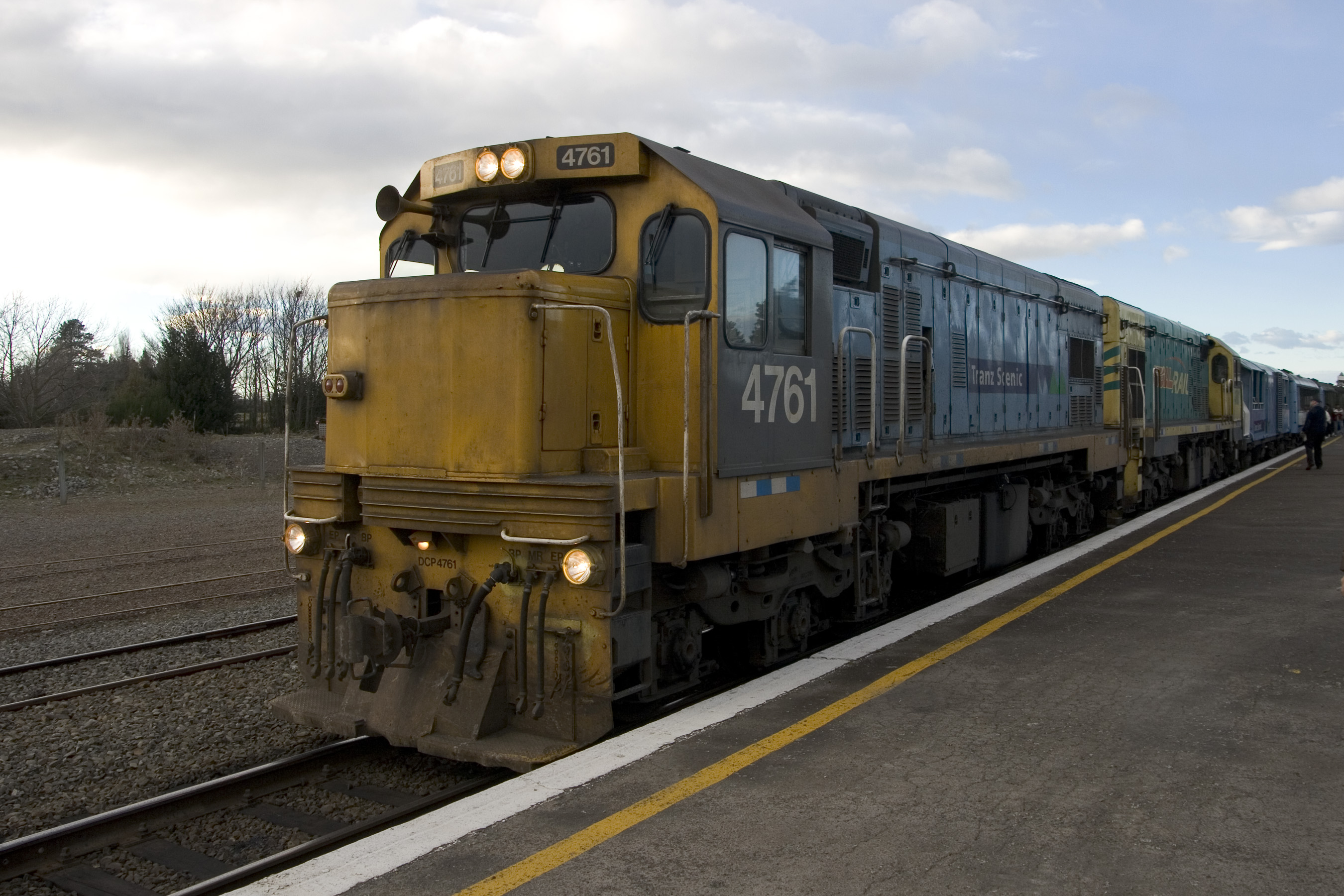
DCPs 4761 and 4801 in Tranz Scenic livery hauling the TranzAlpine at Springfield.

The Great Journeys of New Zealand operates four Scenic train services:

Line	Frequency (each way)	Calling at	Notes
Coastal Pacific	See notes	Picton, Blenheim, Seddon, Kaikōura, Waipara, Rangiora, Christchurch	History: Suspended from November 2016 to December 2018 as a result of significant line damage from the 2016 Kaikōura earthquake and in 2022 due to COVID. Actual: In 2025 the trains run once, daily, with the exception of 1 July to 12 July, when they only run on Friday to Monday.
Northern Explorer	Daily (see notes)	Auckland Strand, Papakura, Hamilton, Ōtorohanga, Taumarunui, National Park, Ohakune, Palmerston North, Paraparaumu, Wellington	Service reinstated recently. Runs southbound from Auckland on Saturdays, Mondays and Thursdays. Runs northbound from Wellington on Sundays, Wednesdays and Fridays. There is no service on Tuesdays.
The Southerner	See notes	Christchurch, Rolleston, Ashburton, Timaru, Oamaru, Dunedin	Limited running in May 2025.
TranzAlpine	Daily	Christchurch, Rolleston, Darfield, Springfield, Arthur's Pass, Otira, Moana, Kokiri, Greymouth	

Capital Connection was also previously part of KiwiRail Scenic Journeys.

KiwiRail trialled excursions with its refurbished Silver Fern railcar to destinations including Napier and on the now mothballed Gisborne line as part of its Explore By Rail trips. Other Silver Fern tours included a Queen's Birthday day tour to Napier, tours to the Tui brewery via the Manawatū Gorge, an Easter Weekend trip to Gisborne, Valentine's Weekend and ANZAC Weekend tours to the central North Island. These excursions have been discontinued as of 2017.

=== Cook Strait ferries ===
Three Cook Strait passenger ferries operate under the brand Interislander:

Image	Name	Built	Entered service	Capacity			Notes
Image	Name	Built	Entered service	Passengers	Road	Rail	Notes
	Aratere	1998	1999	600 + 31 crew	1050 lane metres	420 lane metres (32 wagons)	Numbers are post 2011 modifications.
	Kaiārahi	1998	2015	550	1900	none	built 1998 as Dawn Merchant; chartered temporarily by Interislander in 2014 as Stena Alegra while Aratere was out of service, then chartered long-term in 2015 and renamed Kaiarahi
	Kaitaki	1994	2005	1350 + 60 crew	1780 lane metres (550 cars)	none	built 1994 as Isle of Innisfree; chartered by Interislander in 2005 as Challenger; renamed Kaitaki 2007

KiwiRail Scenic Journeys's former Capital Connection train is not included in the Great Journeys of New Zealand brand. It is, however, operated by KiwiRail and subsidised by the Greater Wellington Regional Council as a long-distance commuter train.

== Rolling stock ==
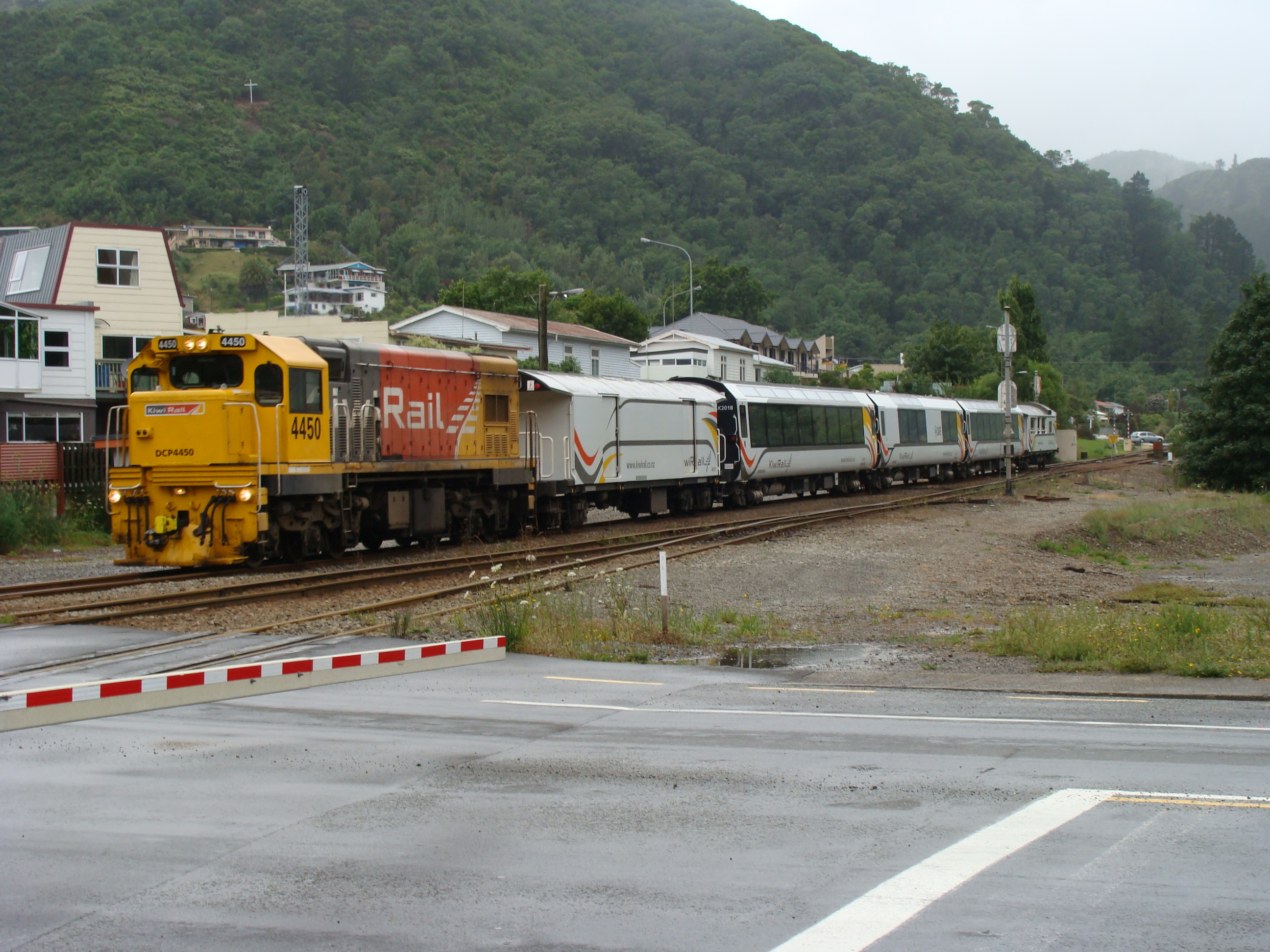
New AK class carriages on the Coastal Pacific at Picton.

In March 2009, the New Zealand Government confirmed funding of NZ$39.9 million for 17 AK Class carriages for the TranzAlpine and Coastal Pacific. The class are the first passenger carriages to be designed and built in New Zealand for many years and were built at KiwiRail's Hillside Workshops in Dunedin, with three cars entering service on the Coastal Pacific on 2 November 2011.

Further AK carriages were deployed on the new Northern Explorer and The TranzAlpine. The Capital Connection uses 1970s built British Rail Mark 2 carriages, refurbished in New Zealand as the S Class.

== Livery ==
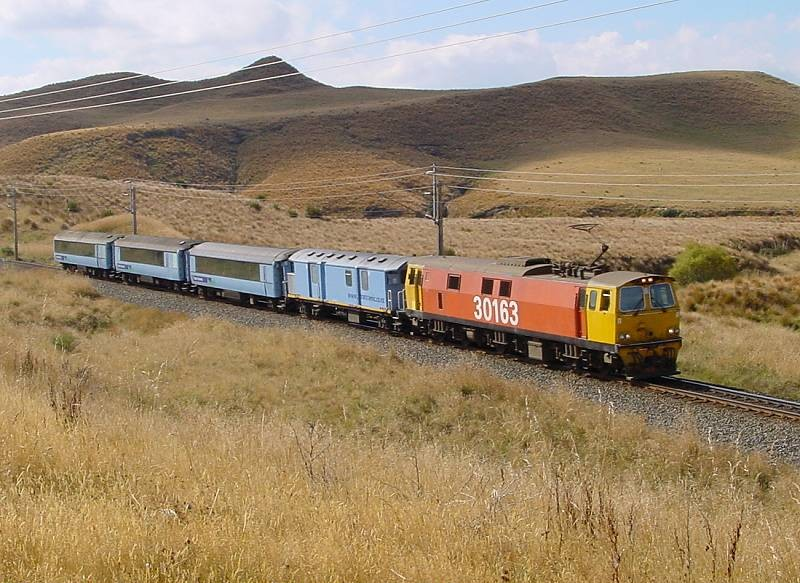
The Overlander hauled by an EF class electric locomotive near Waiouru on the North Island Main Trunk.

The Tranz Scenic brand and blue livery has been replaced by white KiwiRail livery with the introduction of AK carriages on the Coastal Pacific, TranzAlpine and Northern Explorer.

== Former trains ==
In 2004, Tranz Scenic withdrew the Northerner overnight Auckland – Wellington service, citing poor patronage. This was the last overnight service in New Zealand. Tranz Scenic also reduced the number of stations served by The Overlander service on the North Island Main Trunk.

In April 2006, Toll NZ announced that it was proposing to sell its two South Island trains, the TranzAlpine and the TranzCoastal. In July 2006, the end of The Overlander service was announced, but after significant protest and an increase in patronage (due to the publicity) the service continued, operating on Fridays, Saturdays and Sundays during winter and daily in high summer. In 2009, a resumption of seven-day-a-week operation was announced, a result of increasing passenger numbers.

However, the Overlander ceased operations in 2012, being superseded by the Northern Explorer service, again on limited days of the week.

=== Withdrawn 1995 ===
- The Lynx Express: Picton—Christchurch

=== Withdrawn 2001 ===
- The Bay Express: Wellington—Napier
- The Geyserland: Auckland—Rotorua
- The Kaimai Express: Auckland—Tauranga
- The Waikato Connection: Hamilton—Auckland

=== Withdrawn 2002 ===
- The Southerner: Christchurch—Dunedin—Invercargill

=== Withdrawn 2004 ===
- The Northerner: Auckland – Wellington overnight

=== Withdrawn 2012 ===
- The Overlander: Auckland – Wellington daily; replaced by the Northern Explorer running alternate days.

== See also ==
- KiwiRail
- Rail transport in New Zealand
