= South Island Limited =

Former rail passenger service in New Zealand

Overview
- Service type: Express
- Status: Replaced
- First service: 1 August 1949
- Last service: 1 December 1970
- Successor: Southerner
- Former operator(s): New Zealand Railways Department (NZR)

Route
- Termini: Christchurch; Invercargill
- Line(s) used: Main South Line

Technical
- Track gauge: 1,067 mm (3 ft 6 in)

The South Island Limited was a passenger express train operated by the New Zealand Railways Department (NZR) between 1 August 1949 and 1 December 1970. It operated over the almost 590 kilometres (370 mi) Main South Line between Christchurch and Invercargill. It was replaced by the Southerner on 1 December 1970.

== History ==
Expresses between Christchurch and Dunedin began operating when the Main South Line opened. These services were the precursor to the South Island Limited and were the flagship of New Zealand's railways in the nineteenth century. Accordingly, they had the most modern motive power and rolling stock available. They were initially hauled by members of the first J class steam locomotives and limited to a speed of 60 km/h (37 mph), resulting in a journey time of eleven hours. The timetable was accelerated with the introduction of the original K class. The K class locomotives could achieve speeds of up to 90 km/h (56 mph) and they helped to speed up the schedule, with the T class handling the train on the steep section between Oamaru and Dunedin. Upon their introduction in 1885, the N class took on the express duties, followed by U class and U^{B} class locomotives. The original Q and A class cut the journey's time to eight hours in the early years of the 1900s.

In 1904, it became possible to operate an express from Christchurch to Invercargill in a single day. The Dunedin-Invercargill run was treated as an extension of the Christchurch-Dunedin express, and the train was sometimes called the Invercargill Express. In March 1914, it was possible to travel from Christchurch to Invercargill in thirteen hours. A^{B} class locomotives capable of speeds of 107 km/h (66 mph) took over from the A and Q locomotives from 1915, but in the 1930s and during the Second World War, maximum speed on the South Island Main Trunk (SIMT) was limited to 80 km/h (50 mph) due to track and running conditions. The restrictions were removed by the late 1940s when the express, at its zenith, reached sustained higher speeds on the Canterbury Plains and became the South Island Limited from 1 August 1949.

== Operation ==
In 1939, the second J class was introduced, followed by the J^{A} class in 1946. These locomotives allowed the service schedule to be accelerated, and on 1 August 1949, the South Island Limited was introduced. It operated three days a week, supplemented on Monday, Wednesday, and Friday by limited stop mail express train 175 which left Christchurch at 9.00 am and reached Dunedin at 17.25 and northbound train 160 leaving Dunedin at 08.45 am; Timaru at 14.00 to arrive at Hornby at 16.59 and Christchurch 17.13. There was only one daily Ferry Express between Christchurch and Invercargill, train 145, south on Tuesday, Thursday and Saturday and train 174 north and on the Christchurch to Dunedin section, the timetable was very similar to the later 1956-1970 South Island Limited in both directions. Sunday day express operated only Invercargill to Dunedin return. The pre-1956 South Island Limited was a true prestige service with only a few short stops compared with the other mail and ferry express.

Between 1949 and 1956 the South Island Limited had only 4 intermediate stops to Dunedin and 9 to Invercargill with stops at Ashburton, Timaru, Oamaru, Palmerston, Dunedin, Milton, Balclutha, Clinton, and Gore on the way to Invercargill. In 1956 the South Island Limited lost much of its status and ceased to be a true ' Limited' in the public eye with many additional stops and a slower timetable.

In its very early days, it was occasionally operated by A^{B} class locomotives, but the more powerful J and J^{A} class locomotives quickly became the usual motive power, hauling the trains at higher average speeds of 60 km/h (37 mph) stop to start on the Christchurch to Oamaru section. Leaving Christchurch on 143 at 8:35am to reach Dunedin at 3:45pm and Invercargill at 7:55pm achieving a travel time between Christchurch and Dunedin of 7 hours and 10 minutes and completing the entire journey to Invercargill in 11 hours 20 minutes.

From 1956, the consolidation of the daylight schedule into one express each way increased to 21 stops, but only 20 minutes were added to the overall running table, with departure from Christchurch at 8.40 am and arrival at Invercargill at 8.20 pm. By this time, officials generally conceded that much faster running than the 100 km/h (62 mph) authorised was often required to meet the tight timetable, on a single-track railway over the Canterbury and Southland plains. The northbound South Island Limited, train 144 to connect with the Inter-Island Ferry, left Invercargill at 7.40 am to arrive at Christchurch at 7.20 pm for a 17-minute break, before 144 moved on to Lyttelton with adequate time to connect with the inter-island ferry leaving Lyttelton at 20.30, required the performance of the J^{A} class hauled expresses if 20 minutes or later out of Timaru with the 100 miles to Christchurch and 5 scheduled stops, largely to pick up mail at Temuka, Orari, Ashburton, Rakaia and Burnham. Each of these stops, often led to 2-3 minute stops and involved restarts on 1/100 upgrades for 144, resulting in slipping, locomotive damage and a huge waste of coal and energy with usually only Temuka and Ashburton having passengers to pick up by the late 1960s. Am optional sixth stop at Rolleston for northbound 144 on Fridays was timetabled in 1967-1970, due to politicians pressure to provide a connection with an evening railcar to Arhurs Pass and Greymoutn with recovery speeds, sometimes exceeding 120 km/h (75 mph).

In the immediate post-war years and until 1956, the general aim of two daylight expresses daily in both directions on the SIMT continued with the South Island Limited being supplemented on the peak demand days of Mon, Wed, Fri by a second stopping express, trains 160/175, which also provided an early morning departure from Dunedin, at 08.45 in the 1935 and 1952 timetables on the Dunedin express to Christchurch and southbound following the Limited out of Christchurch at midday in the 1920s and 1930s, and postwar at 9.00 am south, to arrive at Dunedin at 17.25, two hours later than the South Island Limited.

Trains 160 and 175 continued to run as a relief holiday express until 1966 and these services were reincarnated as pure mail and express freight trains from 1970 to 1985 on essentially the same 1949 timetable, leaving Christchurch (Middleton) and Dunedin at 09.00 for arrival at 17.00, but stopping only at Timaru and Oamaru for half an hour for shunting. Cut off for the first-night express freight would be 6.30 pm and the train would not leave Moorehouse station until 7:00 pm.

The original consist of the South Island Limited was three first and four second-class carriages providing 330 seats overall with a capacity of over 500 in the school holidays. By the late 1960s, the holiday-peak traffic had eroded and the usual consist for most of the year were two first and two second-class smoker and non-smoker carriages providing 176 seats. The main traffic for the South Island Limited was as a long-distance service to connect with the inter-island Union Steamship Company Steamer Express ferry at Lyttelton and to carry mail, with up to six ZP class wagons for maximum revenue.

== Replacement ==
By 1970, steam locomotives had been almost entirely withdrawn from New Zealand. The North Island had been completely dieselised by the end of 1967, and the 1968 introduction of the DJ class diesel locomotives had led to the dieselisation of almost all of the South Island's services.

The South Island Limited continued to operate with steam motive power, repeating the pattern in the North Island (where the K^{A} and J^{A}s hauled the express and relief expresses until 1965, nine to ten years after steam had been replaced on NIMT freight and the Wairarapa line by 1955–56).

In the last years of the South Island Limited, intermediate stops were increased to 21 but overall journey time was reduced to 11 hours and 40 minutes. The decision was finally taken to withdraw railcars and end the use of steam locomotives in 1967, with the order for the final nine DJ diesel-electric locomotives to replace the J^{A}s on SIMT expresses and express freights, on 26 November 1967.

The South Island Limited was replaced by the diesel-hauled Southerner on 1 December 1970. This was not the end of the steam expresses; J^{A} class steam locomotives continued to work Friday and Sunday evening expresses on the same route for almost a year.
