= Southerner (New Zealand train) =

Former passenger train in New Zealand

The Southerner
Overview
- Service type: Inter-city rail
- Locale: Lower South Island, New Zealand
- Predecessor: South Island Limited
- First service: 1 December 1970
- Last service: 10 February 2002
- Current operator: Great Journeys New Zealand
- Former operators: New Zealand Railways Department (NZR) (1970–1987); InterCity Rail (1987–1995); Tranz Scenic (1995–2002)

Route
- Termini: Christchurch; Invercargill
- Stops: 12
- Distance travelled: 591.6 km
- Average journey time: 9 hours
- Service frequency: 1 per day, in each direction (1999)
- Line used: Main South Line

Technical
- Track gauge: 1,067 mm (3 ft 6 in)

The Southerner was a passenger express train in New Zealand's South Island between Christchurch and Invercargill along the South Island Main Trunk, that ran from Tuesday 1 December 1970 to Sunday 10 February 2002. It was one of the premier passenger trains in New Zealand and its existence made Invercargill the southernmost passenger station in the world. The service returned for a limited time in May 2025.

== Before the Southerner ==
Express passenger trains on the South Island Main Trunk were some of the last services to be hauled by steam locomotives in New Zealand. These services, especially in the late 19th century and early 20th century, were the flagships of the passenger network and received the newest and best motive power and rolling stock. In the mid-20th century, these expresses were augmented by evening railcars between Christchurch and Dunedin.

== Introduction ==
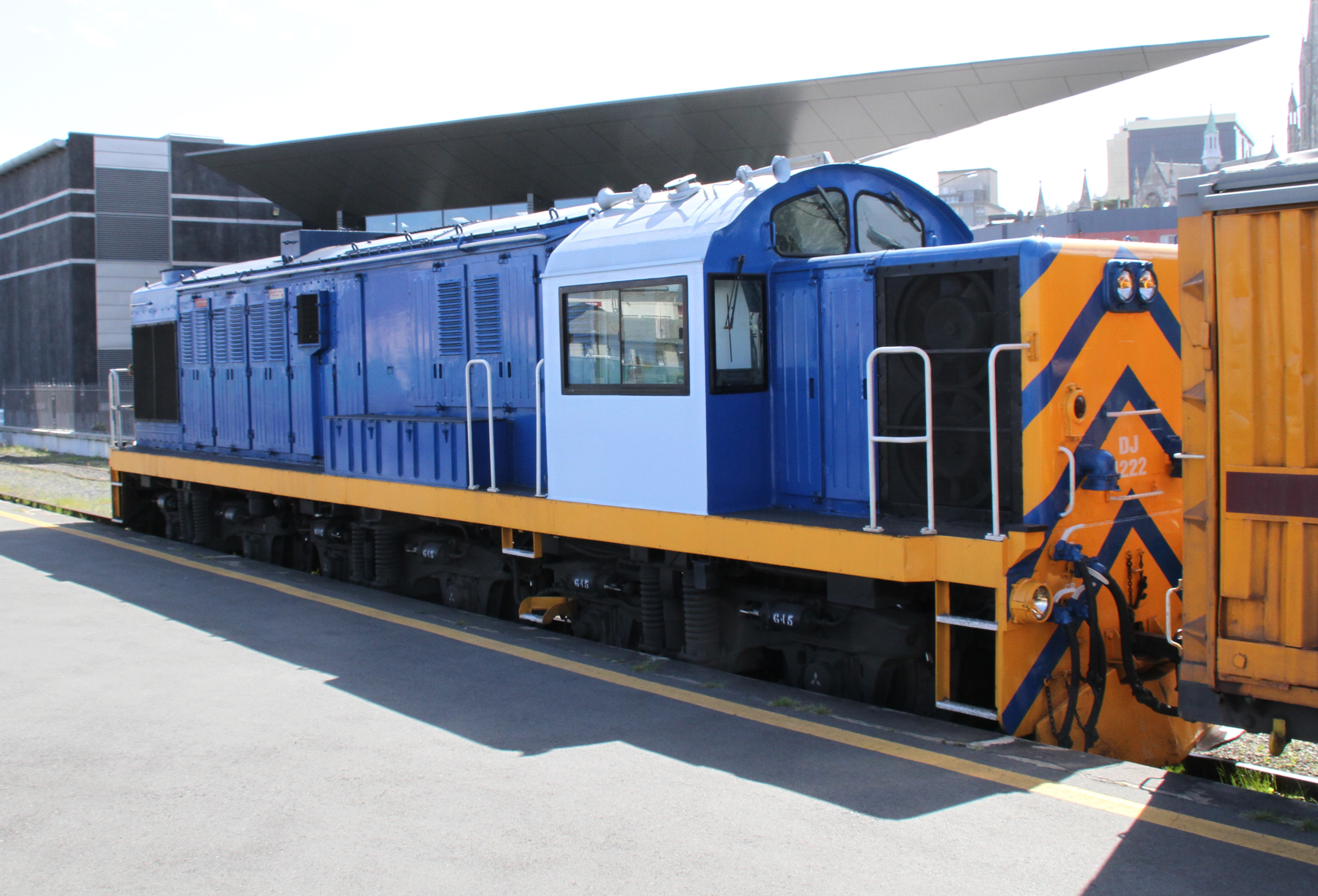
DJ3228 (D^{J} 1222) preserved in "Southerner Blue" livery at Dunedin in 2017

By the late 1960s, steam locomotives had been phased out from the North Island, and a serious effort was being made to replace steam locomotives with diesel-electric locomotives in the South Island. The introduction of the D^{J} class in 1968 sealed the fate of steam, and in May 1969 plans were announced to introduce a premier diesel-hauled express to replace the South Island Limited between Christchurch, Dunedin, and Invercargill. Named the Southerner, it would be hauled by members of the then new D^{J} class, and unlike the steam-hauled expresses, it would not carry mail. It began service on Monday 1 December 1970.

The business model behind the Southerner was a limited-stop service, halting only at major towns, with feeder bus services to smaller towns that had been bypassed. The reintroduction of buffet carriages, the first time since the removal of dining carriages in the 1930s as an economy measure also eliminated the refreshment stops which added time and inconvenience to the journey. The Southerner was a single-class train using former first-class carriages. As a result, all passengers enjoyed wide reclining seats arranged two-and-one; significantly greater comfort than other rail or bus options provided at the time.

Initially, it was planned to use two D^{G} class locomotives to haul the train. When the service was introduced, a single D^{J} class locomotive was used.

Despite the introduction of the Southerner, steam-hauled expresses continued to operate on Friday and Sunday evenings for almost 11 months; the last running on 26 October 1971. This was the last regularly scheduled steam-hauled revenue service in New Zealand. The service was replaced with a diesel-hauled train, which continued until 1979. The evening railcars lasted a few years longer, but the age of the Vulcan railcars was becoming increasingly obvious and the service was cancelled in April 1976 without replacement. After 1979, the Southerner was the only long-distance passenger service on the South Island Main Trunk.

== Rolling stock ==
The original Southerner stock consisted of ten (later twelve) single-toilet South Island Main Trunk Railway first-class carriages, two (later three) full buffet carriages, three vans and, in the 1980s, three wooden 50-ft bogie box wagons for parcels, formed into two trains. All passenger carriages were rebuilt NZR 56-foot carriages dating from 1938 to 1945.

A pressure-ventilated former composite first-class (14 seats) and second-class (28 seats) carriage and the only 56-foot carriage to serve in a Vice-Regal capacity for a Governor-General as a kitchen carriage for the 1934-built North Island Vice Regal car (hence the unique design) were rebuilt as full buffet carriages, incorporating full-length counters and 20 swivel stools. In 1973, a former double-toilet (later designated a North Island Main Trunk railway first-class car) was rebuilt as a third buffet car. Two carriages retained their "coupe" compartment for train staff (one carriage for each train) and one carriage in each train retained its compartment for hostesses.

=== New bogies and seats ===
The buffet carriages were fitted with new Japanese bogies of Kinki-Sharyo manufacture to ensure a smooth ride. Compared to the Timken spring bogies under the other carriages and vans, they offered a superior-quality ride; passengers had complained about the riding quality of the other carriages. The bucket seats were reupholstered in teal-blue vinyl.

With the success of new Korean bogies underneath Northerner carriages, the Southerner carriages were also fitted with this type of bogie. Work on carriage underframes was less substantial than that carried out on the Northerner.

=== InterCity Rail upgrade ===
In the 1980s, NZR Addington Workshops designed a new seat and these had proven successful in Picton/Greymouth carriages, so the Southerner carriages received these seats also, increasing seating capacity from 29 or 33 to 45 or 50 per carriage.

Once new seats were installed, one 45-seat carriage with a staff compartment and one 50-seat carriage without were sent to the North Island for use on the two Gisborne Express sets. In their place on the Southerner were two 32-seat Endeavour carriages.

With delays in the overhaul and refurbishment of all the InterCity Rail stock, the Southerner suffered most. From late 1987, with the Northerner requiring replacement stock, eight carriages from the Southerner were refurbished for the task. This resulted in the remaining three Southerner carriages, carriages from the Picton and Greymouth pool and two former Picton and Greymouth carriages that were heavily refurbished and overhauled for the new TranzAlpine Express keeping the services running, and also saw the standard of service drop considerably. The three full buffet carriages were still used. The two TranzAlpine carriages had their Addington seat numbers reduced from 52 to 50. The seats were reupholstered and modified before being reinstalled and were re-arranged into bays of four, alcove-style, around tables. These two carriages, still retaining their small windows, were permanently allocated to the Southerner when the TranzAlpine was made an all-panorama train.

=== Connoisseur ===
At the same time, the InterCity refurbishment programme started, a private tourist firm leased a Southerner carriage and marketed it as The Connoisseur car. It was thoroughly overhauled and refurbished and offered users a more upmarket service.

In 1988, three more red Picton and Greymouth carriages and an Endeavour carriage were refurbished for the Southerner, entering service Monday, 4 July 1988, joining the two carriages already fitted as such. The Endeavour carriage and one Picton/Greymouth carriage were fitted out as servery carriages, each seating 31, alcove-style, in bays of four. The other two carriages seated 50, alcove-style. The seats were reupholstered and new carpet laid in all four carriages. Two FM class guard's vans were equipped with 11 kW generators at their handbrake ends and became power-baggage vans for the "new" trains. Its reintroduction also saw the cessation of parcels traffic on the trains.

This seating arrangement, while accepted on the TranzAlpine, Coastal Pacific, and Bay Expresses, proved unsuccessful on the Southerner, so one carriage from each set had seating re-arranged to a forward-facing layout.

=== Replacement rolling stock ===
On 27 August 1993, a former Wairarapa Connection carriage turned NIMT servery carriage was brought in to replace the servery carriage damaged in the Rolleston accident two days earlier (see below), along with three refurbished Auckland excursion carriages and their 37.5 kW FM class guards van and the first of the two Bay Express panorama carriages was also allocated to the train as the initial attempt to re-equip it with panorama carriages.

In September 1995, five of the first batch of 11 non-air-conditioned panorama carriages were thoroughly overhauled, air-conditioning and a new-style seat (as in the third three-car Northerner and Overlander set) were installed. Two of these were permanently allocated to the Southerner, the second two temporarily, with the fifth juggling duties between Invercargill, Greymouth and Picton. The two original servery/observation carriages were similarly refurbished. The third TranzAlpine/Coastal Pacific and the first of the two Southerner 11 kW power/baggage vans were fitted with newer, more powerful generators (though less powerful than their NIMT counterparts) and the Southerner van had its public viewing module re-enclosed for luggage carriage again. Later that year, when the Bay Express was re-equipped with two of those seven refurbished carriages, the original two Bay Express carriages were similarly refurbished and permanently allocated to the Southerner.

== Additional services ==
In August 1992, an additional Sunday service was added.

From 1993 onwards, panorama carriages were introduced to this service. Two carriages came from the original Bay Express, two were Southerner carriages turned panorama carriages for the TranzAlpine and Coastal Pacific and one carriage that was formerly The Connoisseur car (also an original Southerner car). Two Picton/Greymouth carriages turned panorama carriages also served these trains until joining the Bay Express to Napier. The original TranzAlpine servery/observation carriage and its Coastal Pacific equivalent were assigned to the Southerner.

After panorama carriages were introduced, the train's popularity increased. Tranz Scenic introduced extra Christchurch-Dunedin, Invercargill-Christchurch, Christchurch-Invercargill and Dunedin-Christchurch services on Fridays, numbered No. 903 to No. 906. These were short-lived, ceasing after a level-crossing accident at Hilderthorpe, North Otago on 14 November 1996.

== Incidents ==
On Wednesday, 25 August 1993, the southbound Southerner, consisting of a DF class locomotive, passenger carriage with luggage space at one end, servery car, day carriage and the second of three TranzAlpine and Coastal Pacific power-baggage vans, was hit at Rolleston by a concrete mixing truck. The bowl of the truck bounced off all three passenger carriages and ripped two of them wide open. Three people were killed, one of whom was Louise Cairns, daughter of former New Zealand cricketer Lance Cairns and sister of then-representative Chris Cairns. Chris Cairns has since become a campaigner for safety around the rail corridor and level-crossings through the Chris Cairns Foundation, which later became known as TrackSAFE Foundation New Zealand.

Two days later, a replacement train consisting of three recently refurbished carriages and the FM power and baggage van with 37.5 kW generator from the Auckland excursion fleet was brought in to supplement the remaining four Southerner carriages. The first and second of these temporary replacement carriages seated 50, alcove-style, like the Southerner carriages, but with a more modern seat, seen on upgraded Masterton carriages and the NIMT carriages. The third carriage seated 54 in the same type of seat, but with all seats facing into two centre tables, one on each side of the aisle. The NIMT car turned buffet car in 1973 returned to the train as part of the replacement consist.

On 13 December 1994, a van in the southbound Southerner was derailed by buckled track about 3 km (1.9 mi) north of Edendale, when the train, with 30 passengers and 3 crew, was slightly exceeding the 90 km/h (56 mph) speed limit. There were no injuries. A hearing found that improvements in the maintenance of continuous welded rail were needed to keep it in place in hot weather.

On Thursday, 14 November 1996, one of the two Southerner trains was involved in a level-crossing crash at Hilderthorpe, North Otago, killing four people. The train was involved in another crash in July 2000, colliding with a ute at Edendale, 53 kilometres (33 mi) north of Invercargill. On Monday, 8 January 2001, the southbound Southerner was again involved in a level crossing crash, this time with a cattle truck. The DC-class locomotive and two of three passenger carriages were derailed, injuring 21 passengers and forcing the destruction of 10 cattle-beasts.

== Timetable ==
The advantages of the new technology, the removal of delays caused by the carriage of mail, and the elimination of refreshment stops became apparent instantly, with the travel time between Christchurch and Dunedin cut by almost an hour from 7 hours 9 minutes to 6 hours 14 minutes. Initially, the service stopped at only a small number of stations along the Main South Line – Gore, Balclutha, Dunedin, Oamaru, Timaru and Ashburton, with feeder bus services for passengers travelling to other destinations. Gradually, additional stops were added, although a number were "stops on request" only.

Typically, two DJ class diesel locomotives hauled the train, and when a third was added to increase power on the rugged, difficult line between Oamaru and Dunedin, another 19 minutes were cut from the schedule.

== Dining service ==
The Southerner was the first train on New Zealand Railways to include a full dining service since the abolition of dining carriages as an economy measure in World War I. The Southerner had a full-service buffet carriage with 20 seats that served hot meals and cafeteria-style food, replaced in the early 1990s with a buffet bar service for passengers to purchase food to be consumed at their seats.

== Demise and withdrawal ==
By the 1990s, the DJ class had been largely withdrawn and other locomotives hauled the Southerner, including the DC and DX classes.

The service ran at a loss and had been supported by government subsidies until these were abolished for all long-distance passenger trains in 1989. New Zealand Rail changed the seating configuration by replacing the very generous three-abreast configuration with a more standard four-abreast, with reduced (but still generous compared to bus) seat pitch. The full-service buffet carriage was replaced with a buffet servery. Both measures reduced costs significantly, but the service was challenged by the increasing number of low-cost shuttle bus services, particularly between Christchurch and Dunedin, which were significantly cheaper than the train. Nonetheless, the Southerner still operated seven days a week, one service each way.

As branch lines were nearly non-existent (and with those still in use not open to passenger train) and as Dunedin's suburban passenger services had been withdrawn by 1982, it was the sole regular train to stop at the famous Dunedin Railway Station, once the country's busiest. At this time, the typical consist comprised only two or three carriages and a power/luggage van, and the southbound journey from Christchurch and Dunedin was timetabled to take 5 hours 46 minutes, with an additional 3 hours 19 minutes to reach Invercargill. Northbound, the journey from Invercargill to Dunedin was scheduled at 3 hours 28 minutes, with another 5 hours 27 minutes to Christchurch.

It continued to face increased bus competition, and with increased private car ownership and competition in the airline industry, the Southerner seemed unable to find a profitable niche.

In June 2001, Tranz Rail sold a 50% share in long-distance passenger services operated by Tranz Scenic to directors of Australian company West Coast Railway, but the company elected not to purchase the Southerner without the promise of a subsidy. The Ministry of Economic Development funded a feasibility study into the economic impact of subsidising the Southerner, but this failed to demonstrate a viable business case for the service; patronage having fallen to an average of between 40 and 50 people per day in each direction. This was roughly half what was necessary to make the train viable. As neither airline nor bus services along the route were subsidised, the government decided not to subsidise the train and its demise was inevitable.

Public outcry failed to save the train, and the last services ran on Sunday, 10 February 2002. The carriages were re-allocated to the TranzAlpine between Christchurch and Greymouth and the TranzCoastal between Christchurch and Picton. Invercargill lost its status as the southernmost passenger station in the world.

== After the Southerner ==
Kiwirail proposed a re-introduction of the service in December 2016 from Christchurch to Dunedin as a tourist service during the time that the Coastal Pacific service would be suspended following the Kaikōura earthquake.

In June 2017, Paula Bennett and Simon Bridges announced that $50,000 government grant would fund a business case for reinstating the service. The service however, did not return and in 2018 there were proposals for a chartered service running when major concerts occurred in Dunedin.

In August 2023, The Opportunities Party announced that, if elected to Parliament at the 2023 general election, it would restore the service as a 5-year trial. Dr Duncan Connors from University of Otago's Business School also proposed a "Student Rail Route", That would be included in Student Fees for Students studying at Ara Institute, the University of Canterbury, Lincoln University, Otago Polytechnic, the University of Otago and the Southern Institute of Technology. The service would reduce the emissions of reach university/polytechnic, in line with net-zero commitments.

A campaign to bring back the Southerner was launched in May 2024 by advocacy group The Future is Rail, who talked to several district and regional councils in attempt to fund a feasibility study.

The service returned for a limited time in May 2025, operated by Great Journeys New Zealand for four days (running from Christchurch to Dunedin) as a tourist service. Due to the popularity of the return (all services sold out) it was announced that the train would return again for four daily trips in October 2025. A tourist service from Christchurch to Invercargill operated by Mainland Rail and named The Mainlander began in 2026.

In July 2025, a 12,000+ signature petition was to Minister Mark Patterson supporting a return of the Southerner as a regular public service from Invercargill to Christchurch.
