= Wairarapa Connection =

New Zealand commuter rail service

Wairarapa Line
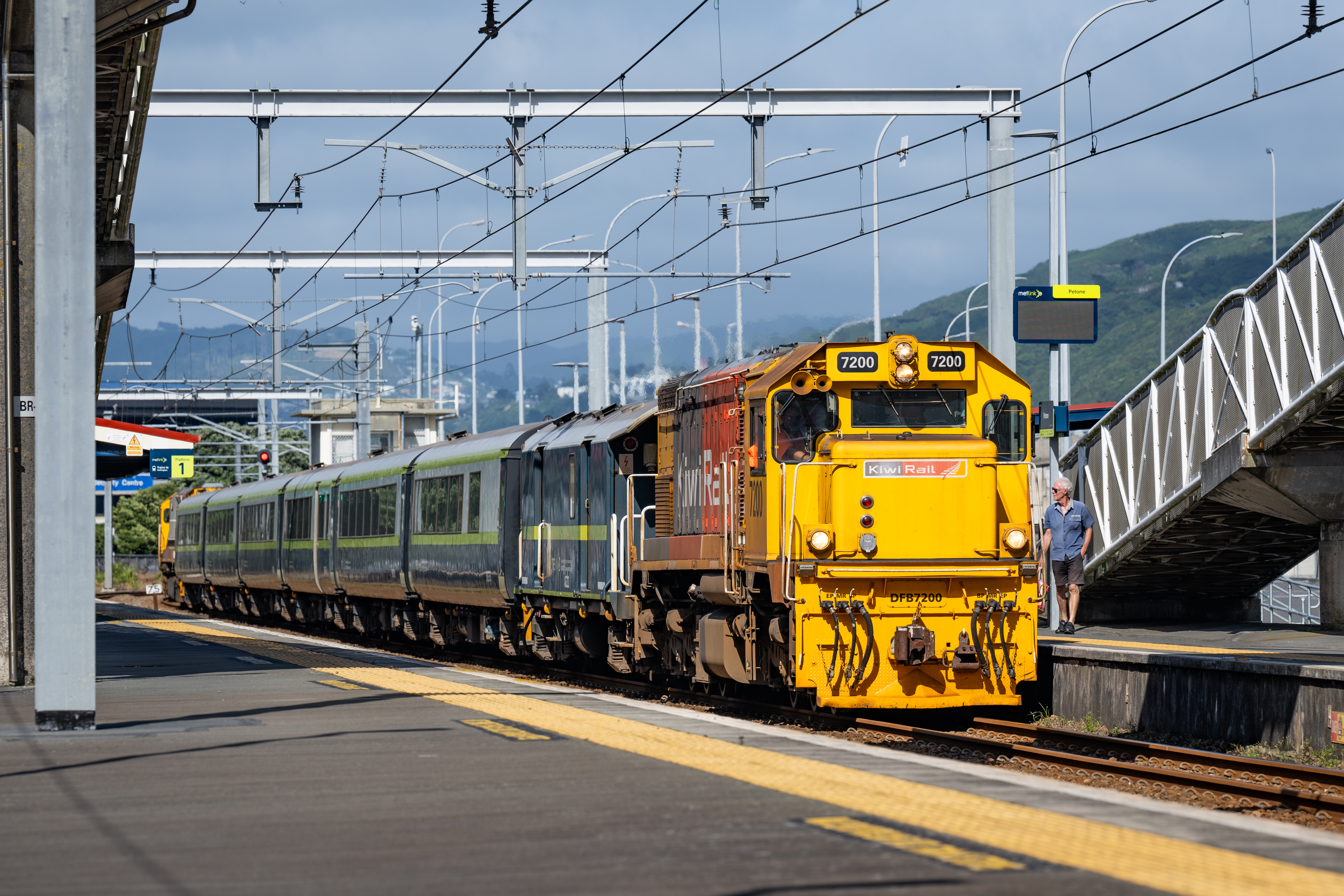
- A DF class locomotive hauling SW carriages

Overview
- Service type: Commuter rail
- Status: Operating
- Locale: Wellington Region, New Zealand
- First service: 1964; 62 years ago
- Current operator: Transdev Wellington
- Former operators: New Zealand Railways Department (1964–1981); New Zealand Railways Corporation (1981–1985); Cityrail (1985–1995); Tranz Metro (1995–2016)
- Ridership: 705,000 annually (2012–2013)

Route
- Termini: Wellington; Masterton
- Stops: 12
- Distance travelled: 91 km (57 mi)
- Average journey time: 1 hour 40 minutes~~
- Service frequency: Mon-Thu: five each way Fri: six each way Sat, Sun, Public Holidays: two each way

On-board services
- Class: Standard class only
- Disabled access: Yes, through SWS carriage
- Seating arrangements: Airline style and table bay
- Baggage facilities: Overhead racks Baggage carriage

Technical
- Rolling stock: 5× DFB class locomotives 18× SW class carriages 6× SE class carriages 1× AG class luggage van
- Track gauge: 1,067 mm (3 ft 6 in)
- Timetable number: WRL

The Wairarapa Connection is a New Zealand interurban commuter rail service along the Wairarapa Line between Masterton, the largest town in the Wairarapa, and Wellington. It is operated by Wellington suburban operator Transdev (with KiwiRail sub-contracted to operate the locomotives) under contract from the Greater Wellington Regional Council. It is a diesel-hauled carriage service, introduced by the New Zealand Railways Department in 1964 after passenger demand between Masterton to Wellington exceeded the capacity of the diesel railcars then used.

The 91-kilometre (57 mi) service operates five times daily in each direction Monday to Friday, three peak and two off-peak, with an additional service each way on Friday nights and two services each way on weekends and public holidays. It stops at all stations from Masterton to Upper Hutt, then runs express along the Hutt Valley Line to Wellington, stopping only at Waterloo and Petone stations.

While most regional passenger trains in New Zealand have been withdrawn (apart from the Capital Connection commuter service to Palmerston North and the Te Huia between Auckland and Hamilton), the Wairarapa Connection service continues due to the Wairarapa's proximity to Wellington and the advantage of the 8.8 km Remutaka Tunnel through the Remutaka Ranges compared to the narrow and winding Remutaka Hill Road over them. In the year to 30 June 2013, the service's ridership was 705,000, down slightly from 719,000 in the 2011/12-year. 780,000 used the train in 2019.

The present Wairarapa Connection trains are to be replaced by new five-car New Zealand BEMU class electric multiple units from 2030. The battery electric multiple unit (BEMU) trains are to be built by French manufacturer Alstom, and named Tūhono.

== History ==
Before the Wairarapa Connection, 88 seater railcars were used between Masterton and Wellington. They had replaced the steam-hauled mixed trains and Wairarapa class railcars in 1955, when the Rimutaka Tunnel opened and the line became the first fully dieselised line in New Zealand. The Wairarapa Mail carriage train ran between Wellington and Woodville until 1948.

In 1964, the demand between Masterton and Wellington was exceeding the capacity of the 88-seater railcars, with a capacity of 176 with two railcars. The solution was to introduce a diesel-hauled carriage service.

=== Carriage history ===
In 1964, six 56-foot carriages from the South Island were transferred north and fitted with Webasto kerosene-burning heaters for the service. They seated 336 passengers on two-person bench-type Scarrett seats: class A passenger cars seated 56 and AL car-vans (with luggage compartment) seated 47.

In 1976, three more As and an AL were added, later joined by another A and AL, all overhauled. They were fitted with fluorescent strip lighting similar to Northerner and Endeavour cars, and painted in a new, brighter shade of red, with white roofs as opposed to the standard silver oxide.

In the early 1980s, with the refurbishment of the Picton and Greymouth services and the decision to use the former Endeavour carriages on new Gisborne-Wellington services, former 88-seater railcars painted a distinctive green and nicknamed "Grass Grubs", were introduced to the Wairarapa service. However, the underframes were not designed to be towed in the long term and they deteriorated rapidly, bringing about their demise by 1985.

The introduction of the EM class "Ganz-Mavag" electric multiple units to the Wellington suburban system meant eleven 56-foot carriages became available, and the cancellation of the unnamed daylight successor to the New Plymouth Night Express that ran between New Plymouth and Taumarunui freed more. A wooden 50-foot Z bogie box wagon was refitted with bogies that enabled it to run at passenger-train speed and was painted the same shade of bright red as the cars it accompanied. In the style of the new Fastrak and Northtrak express parcels logos that emphasised the new approach and priority of parcels traffic, the wagon had a logo known as Waitrak, as it was dedicated to Wairarapa services.

In 1989, with the introduction of the Bay Express between Wellington and Napier, the three remaining Endeavour cars, of which two were ALs, became redundant, so the 54-seat A car and one 46-seat AL were assigned to Wairarapa services. With the streamlining of Greymouth expresses into one out-and-back operation, one Picton car became surplus to requirements and joined the Masterton fleet.

In 1993, after the successful re-introduction and rebranding of the Capital Connection service, a similar refurbishment and rebranding program was initiated for the sixteen Wairarapa carriages, though only 12 were actually overhauled. This program lasted four years, until 1997. Six A cars and three of four ALs were thoroughly overhauled and refurbished with new-style seats. These vehicles were fitted with cloth on the interior walls to reduce noise and were fully carpeted. A class carriages seated 59, as one toilet from each car was removed to increase seating capacity, while ALs seated 46. The other two A cars and the remaining AL were overhauled but retained their Scarrett seats, reupholstered with cloth material.

The overhauls saw the introduction of the new InterCity Rail blue livery, with a 220-mm white stripe and 100-mm green band inside it running the length of each car, with "Cityrail" emblazoned on both ends of each car. In 1995, as an interim measure leading up to the phasing in of the new all-over Cato blue livery of the new Tranz Rail corporate image, a light blue 350-mm full-length stripe was introduced, and a new name for Cityrail, Tranz Metro. From the beginning of the refurbishment of the seventh car, the new Cato blue livery was applied, along with the Tranz Metro logo.

In 1995, two of the four ALs were equipped with generators similar to those installed in power-baggage vans used by long-distance passenger trains, making them power-luggage vans. In 2002 one car was refurbished for the Wairarapa but retained original seating, albeit reupholstered. In 2003 the other car was rebuilt and refurbished for use as a "small window" air-conditioned car for the NIMT passenger trains. A third car was stripped to the underframe but retained its compartment-dividing walls for profile purposes, while the fourth was scrapped.

From 1999 onward, due to age and related deterioration, gradual withdrawal from service of older carriages occurred, and cars from long-distance Tranz Scenic services were used on the interim. These included two former Auckland charter cars that were refurbished in 1993. These two cars were then permanently allocated to the Wairarapa.

A former 1988 Southerner car turned NIMT no-frills car, later fitted with air-conditioning, was then permanently allocated to the Wairarapa. The sole remaining former single-lavatory first-class car, which served in the 1970 Southerner, 1988 Northerner and, as a "Backpackers" car, the TranzCoastal Express in 1996, was also working the service in 2003. While on the TranzCoastal it was fitted with air-conditioning. This is not the first time this carriage has worked the Wairarapa services; in 1995, while assigned to the NIMT and sporting the InterCity blue with white stripe and green band, it ran on the Wairarapa Connection for a time with the first car-van to receive a generator.

In 2006, Hillside Engineering won the contract from the Greater Wellington Regional Council to rebuild 18 British Rail Mark 2 carriages to replace the fleet. They are classified SW for cars with passenger saloon only, SWS with servery and SWG with luggage compartment and generator for power supply. The S stands for "Scenic Series" and "W" for "Wairarapa", to distinguish them from their Capital Connection counterparts, classified S.

On 11 May 2007, the first four cars entered service, with three more introduced on 18 June 2007 making up a 7-car consist. The remaining 11 cars entered service incrementally by the end of 2007.

The inaugural run of the first four cars was on 14 May 2007, being met by the Minister of Transport, Annette King, on arrival on Platform 9 at Wellington at 9.20 am. It departed Masterton at 7.30 am, and called at Carterton at 7.48 am, Featherston at 8.09 am and Upper Hutt at 8.32 am.

The first run in service was on Thursday 18 May on train 1602, departing Wellington at 8.25 am.

In early 2007, the longest Wairarapa Connection consist (seven cars and van), which formed the weekdays 6.30 am from Masterton and 4.33 pm from Wellington had five cars replaced by ones from the now-disbanded charter fleet so that their Korean bogies can be overhauled and placed under five of the new SW cars. The charter cars run on old NZR Timken bogies limited to 80 km/h, not the 100 km/h standard carriage train speed.

In 2017, a survey found a desire for more off-peak and weekend services and a more punctual service. In July, Labour leader Andrew Little promised expenditure on the line from the proposed regional development fund. The Wellington Metro upgrade was expected to improve operation of the service.

In 2019, the GWRC proposed replacing in 2025 the Capital Connection and Wairarapa Connection trains with 15 four-car dual-mode multiple units, to operate from overhead power from Wellington to Upper Hutt or an on-board power source north of Upper Hutt; to cost $415 million. The New Zealand Upgrade Programme announced on 30 January 2020 included for the Wairarapa Line passing loops at Carterton, Featherston and Maymorn and a second platform at Featherston.

In February 2020, the GWRC announced that the Wairarapa Connection carriages were to be refurbished to extend their life until new rolling stock is introduced. In 2023 it was announced that 18 four-car trains will be built for Kapiti Coast and Wairarapa lines.

Improvements planned for the Wairarapa Line beyond Upper Hutt from 2021 to 2024 include track renewals with full renewal in the Remutaka and Maoribank tunnels, renewals of timber elements in three bridges, refurbishments of some level crossings and drainage and vegetation clearing.

== Rolling stock ==
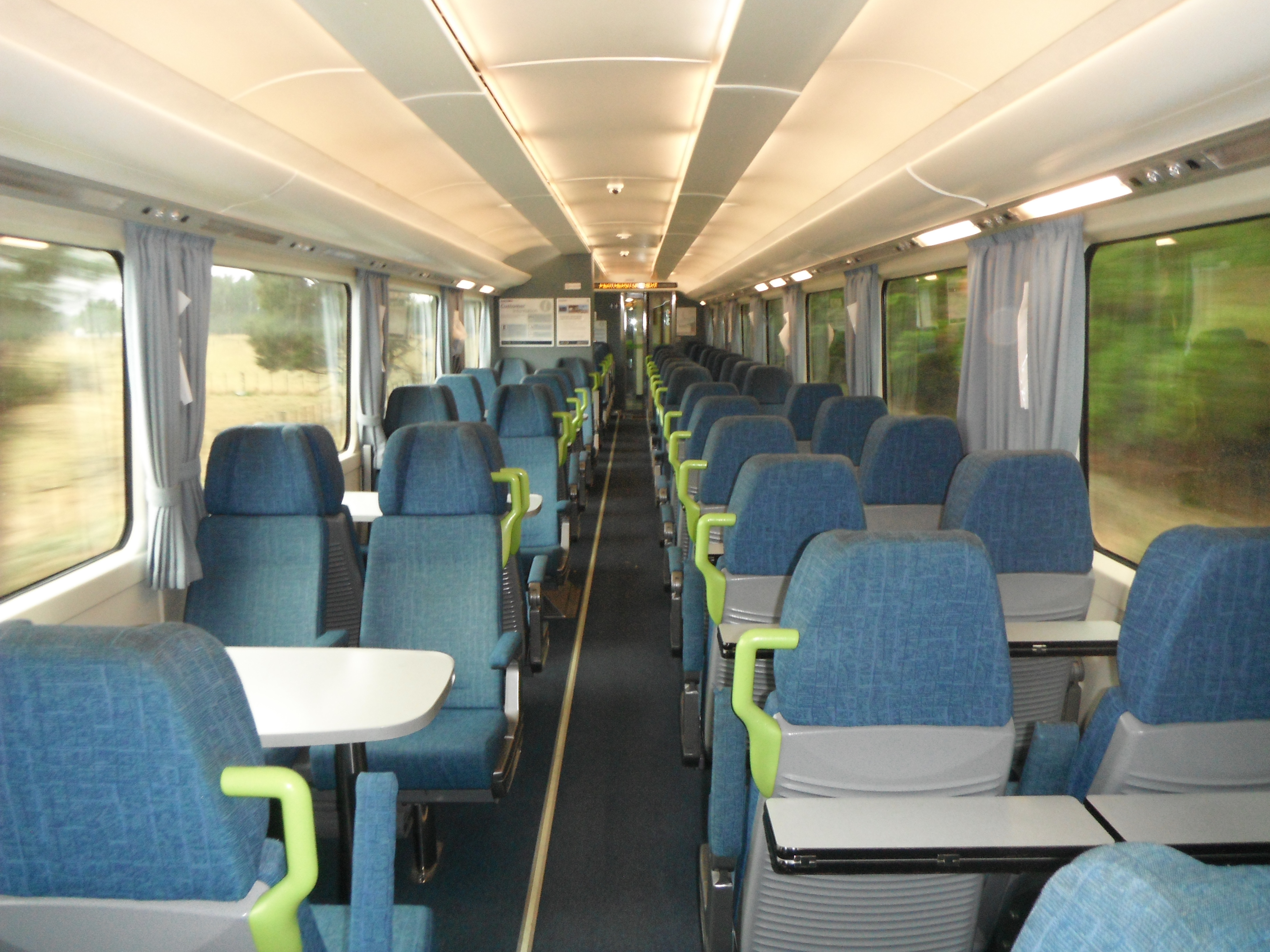
The interior of Wairarapa Connection carriage SW5658

The Wairarapa Connection is the only diesel-hauled service operated by Metlink, hauled by diesel-electric locomotives from KiwiRail's fleet. Usually four locomotives are allocated weekly to the Wairarapa Line, operating the Wairarapa Connection and Masterton–Wellington freight services. Since July 2015, DFB class locomotives have been used. DBR, DC class and DA class locomotives were used in the past.

Carriages are the SW class, rebuilt British Rail Mark 2 carriages introduced in 2007 to replace the NZR 56-foot carriages used since the service's introduction, some of which were 70 years old. Eighteen carriages are used – twelve SW with 64 seats; three SWS with 37 seats, wheelchair hoist and disabled toilet; and three SWG with 37 seats, luggage compartment and generator. The carriages are formed into three sets of between three and eight carriages, consisting of (from the Masterton end of train) an SWG, an SW, an SWS, and then the remaining SW carriages. Because of the short platforms at Renall Street, Solway, Matarawa and Maymorn stations, selective door operation is employed and passengers are asked to alight from the three northernmost (Masterton-end) carriages.

In July 2013, the six SE class BR MkII carriages, which had been used as a temporary measure with top-and-tailed EO class electric locomotives in Wellington for two years until the arrival of the new "Matangi" FP/FT class EMUs, were introduced on the Wairarapa Connection. They made up a fourth set of carriages, increasing capacity and allowing more flexibility, but were criticised by for their smaller seat pitch, poor lighting, and lack of tray tables and power outlets. The pitch issues were rectified over the 2013 Christmas period by removing a row of seats and adjusting the location of the remainder, and additional tables fitted. The SE set operates as a 'standalone' consist, since the SE and SW carriages have slightly different electrical systems and cannot be mixed. As of June 2019 this issue has been fixed.

As of June 2019, there are three consists: an 9-carriage train consisting of 6 SE carriages and 3 SW carriages, a 6-carriage SW consist and another 6-carriage SW consist, plus a spare 4-car SW consist. The 9-carriage SW and SE consist operates two services: 1603 (the 06:20 ex-Masterton) and 1606 (the 16:25 ex-Wellington). The two 6-carriage consists alternate daily, one set operating 1605 (the 06:47 ex-Masterton) and 1608 (the 17:30 ex-Wellington) while the other operates the remaining six services.

There is also a luggage and generator carriage, AG222, used to supplement or replace the SWG or SEG carriages. If the SWG/SEG carriage is replaced, an extra SW/SE carriage is added, making the consist AG–SW–SW–SWS–SW.

Class	BR type	Number	Entered service
SW	2F FO	3282	November 2007
SE	2F FO	3288	
SW	2F FO	3294	4 September 2007
SWS	2F FO	3298	11 October 2007
SE	2F FO	3311	
SE	2F FO	3324	
SES	2F FO	3327	
SW	2F FO	3339	19 June 2007
SW	2F FO	3349	11 October 2007
SW	2F FO	3355	11 October 2007
SWG	2F FO	3365	14 May 2007
SW	2F FO	3376	19 June 2007
SE	2F FO	3380	
SW	2F FO	3394	19 June 2007
SW	2F FO	3404	November 2007
SWG	2F FO	3422	11 October 2007
SEG	2F FO	3430	
SW	2D TSO	5646	4 September 2007
SW	2D TSO	5658	August 2007
SWS	2D TSO	5660	14 May 2007
SWG	2D TSO	5671	24 July 2007
SWS	2D TSO	5723	24 July 2007
SW	2E TSO	5820	14 May 2007
SW	2E TSO	5837	14 May 2007

=== Replacement of rolling stock ===
In 2025 GWRC announced the new rolling rolling stock to be five-car New Zealand BEMU class electric multiple units from 2030. The battery electric multiple unit (BEMU) trains built by French manufacturer Alstom, see New Zealand BEMU class electric multiple unit, were approved in 2025; they are to enter service in 2030. They are to be named Tūhono meaning connect or unite. The trains are based on Alstom’s Adessia trains but with change like narrow gauge and also front evacuation doors (for single-track tunnels). They are expected to enter service in 2030. The minister Chris Bishop expects that their higher top speed will reduce travel time by fifteen minutes.

== Services ==
There are five trains each way between Masterton and Wellington Monday to Friday: three at peak times, to Wellington in the morning and to Masterton in the evening; and two inter-peak. A sixth service operates late Friday night. On weekends and public holidays, two services operate, one in the morning and one in the evening.

Train numbers for the service are 1601 to 1616. The 6 specifies the train leaves Wellington via the Hutt Valley Line, while the 1 specifies a Masterton-bound service (2 indicates Upper Hutt, 4 indicates Taita, and 5 indicates Melling). Down services (towards Wellington) have odd numbers, while up services (towards Masterton) have even numbers

	Monday to Friday					Friday	Saturday and Sunday	
Masterton–Wellington (down)	1601	1603	1605	1607	1609	1611	1613	1615
Wellington–Masterton (up)	1602	1604	1606	1608	1610	1612	1614	1616

== Fares and ticketing ==
To avoid Hutt Valley passengers overcrowding the service, passengers boarding a Masterton-bound Wairarapa Connection service at Wellington and alighting before Maymorn station must pay the full fare from Wellington to Maymorn ($10.50 as of July 2016). Those using ten-trip tickets and monthly passes must pay the cash fare difference as a surcharge, i.e. $5.00 for Petone and Waterloo, $1.00 for Upper Hutt. Warnings about the minimum fare are placed on the doors of all SW and SE carriages. Until April 2011, the minimum fare also applied to those boarding Wellington-bound services after Maymorn. This was temporarily removed in April 2011 to help alleviate a rolling stock shortage brought about by the delayed introduction of the Matangi electric multiple units, and was later made permanent in October 2011.

== Accidents ==
The Wairarapa Connection has been involved in several accidents. Most have occurred at level crossings, where road vehicles have passed warning signs or signals and have been hit by the train. There are 28 public level crossings between Rimutaka tunnel and Masterton, of which three are controlled by alarms and barrier arms, 19 by alarms only, and six by signs only. Between Wellington and the Rimutaka tunnel there are four, all controlled by alarms and barrier arms.

On 17 October 1997, the mid-morning service to Wellington broke down 2.5 km into the Rimutaka Tunnel from the Featherston portal after an electrical fault in locomotive DC 4951's control gear. The Rimutaka Tunnel is a radio dead-spot, and the train driver and guard found the Train Control telephones on the tunnel wall to be dead. Shortly afterwards, the tunnel alarm sounded at Upper Hutt signal box indicating the train had been in the tunnel for more than 15 minutes, and a full-scale emergency response was activated. The train was removed from the tunnel two hours later by a relief locomotive from the Featherston end after a haphazard response on both sides of the tunnel. There were no injuries, although some elderly passengers required medical treatment due to distress. After the incident, changes were made to the Train Control telephones so they would self-test and track occupancy rules were modified to allow trains to coast out of the tunnel (which has a gradient of 0.25% to 0.55%) if they became disabled. Emergency services on either side of the tunnel now carry out training exercises every 2–3 years in preparation for such a situation.

On 23 July 2009, the 17:33 service to Masterton hit a mudslide blocking the line just north of Maoribank tunnel near Maymorn. The locomotive, DCP4818, and the first carriage, SWG3422, derailed. Only minor injuries were reported, but the slip and the derailed rolling stock blocked the line, preventing services operating until Sunday evening (26 July). The accident highlighted a flaw in the design of the pneumatically-operated interior doors in the SW carriages, which stuck in position when the compressed air supply was lost as a result of the locomotive being shut down. Three people were needed to open them by hand, sparking concerns that the carriages could not be evacuated quickly in the event of a fire. The doors were modified so they would open automatically if the compressed air supply is lost.

== See also ==
- Tranz Scenic
- Wellington railway station
- Tranz Metro
- Wairarapa Line
