= Northern Explorer =

Long-distance passenger train in New Zealand

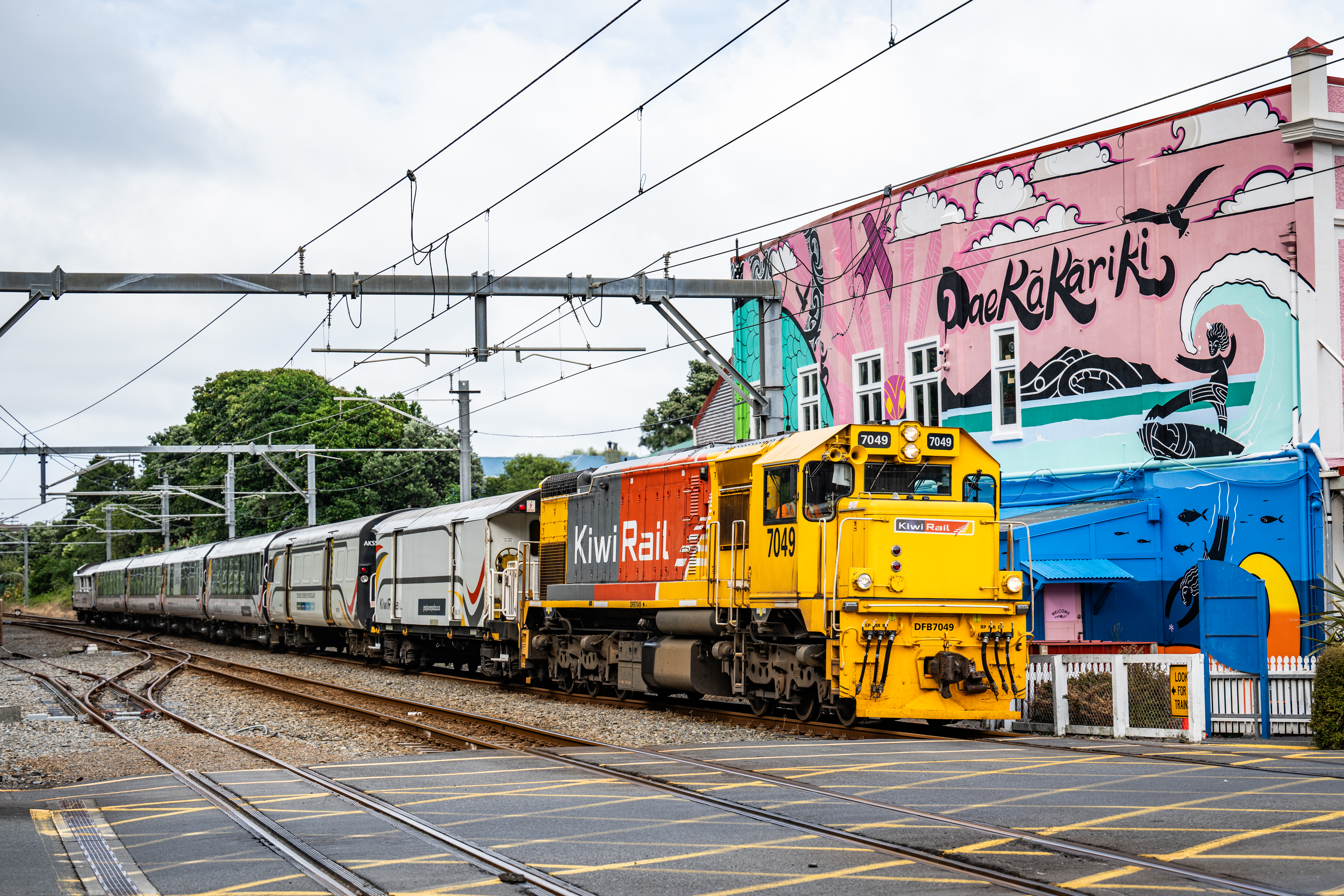
- Northern Explorer train set at Paekākāriki on 7 February 2024

Overview
- Service type: Inter-city rail
- Status: Operating
- Locale: North Island, New Zealand
- Predecessor: Overlander
- First service: 25 June 2012
- Current operator: Great Journeys New Zealand
- Former operator: KiwiRail Scenic Journeys

Route
- Termini: Wellington; Auckland
- Stops: 10
- Distance travelled: 681 km (423 mi)
- Average journey time: 10 hours 55 minutes northbound 10 hours 35 minutes southbound
- Service frequency: 3 per week in each direction, 6 trips total
- Line used: North Island Main Trunk

On-board services
- Seating arrangements: Airline style, alcove, and lounger
- Catering facilities: On-board café
- Observation facilities: Large windows in all carriages
- Baggage facilities: Overhead racks Baggage carriage

Technical
- Rolling stock: New Zealand AK class carriages, DFB locomotives

The Northern Explorer is a long-distance passenger train operated by the Great Journeys New Zealand division of KiwiRail between Auckland and Wellington in the North Island of New Zealand, along the North Island Main Trunk (NIMT). Three services operate per week in each direction between Auckland's The Strand Station and Wellington railway station. The Northern Explorer replaced the Overlander from 25 June 2012.

It was suspended in December 2021, after suspension in August for COVID-19 lockdown. However, it restarted on 25 September 2022.

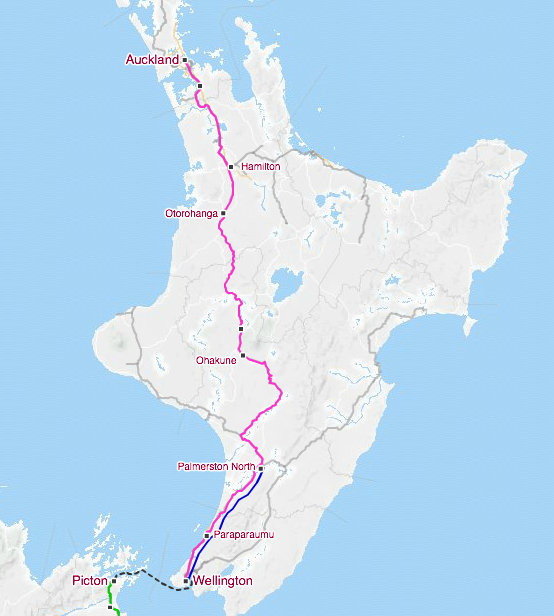
KiwiRail passenger trains in the North Island

== History ==
=== Origins ===
The first regular daylight Wellington–Auckland passenger train services, augmenting the older overnight services, were the steam-hauled Daylight Limited and diesel-hauled Scenic Daylight, which ran primarily during summer months and Easter holiday period for many years from the 1920s onwards. The arrival of the Blue Streak and later Silver Fern railcars saw an end for a time to regular carriage trains. At the time of its cessation, The Overlander was usually hauled by DC or EF locomotives with NZR 56-foot carriages.

=== Re-branding as the Northern Explorer ===
In 2012, passenger numbers were in decline and KiwiRail decided to replace the Overlander with the Northern Explorer, from Monday 25 June 2012. The timetable was accelerated by eliminating intermediate stops, except Paraparaumu, Palmerston North, Ohakune, National Park, Otorohanga (summer only), Hamilton and Papakura. From October 2016, fire-suppressed DFB class locomotives (as required for diesel-hauled passenger trains in tunnels) were assigned to the service.

The service used one AKC and three AK class carriages, an AKL class luggage van and an AKV class power/viewing van from the Coastal Pacific. A larger AKS luggage van, converted from SA, replaced AKL in 2019.

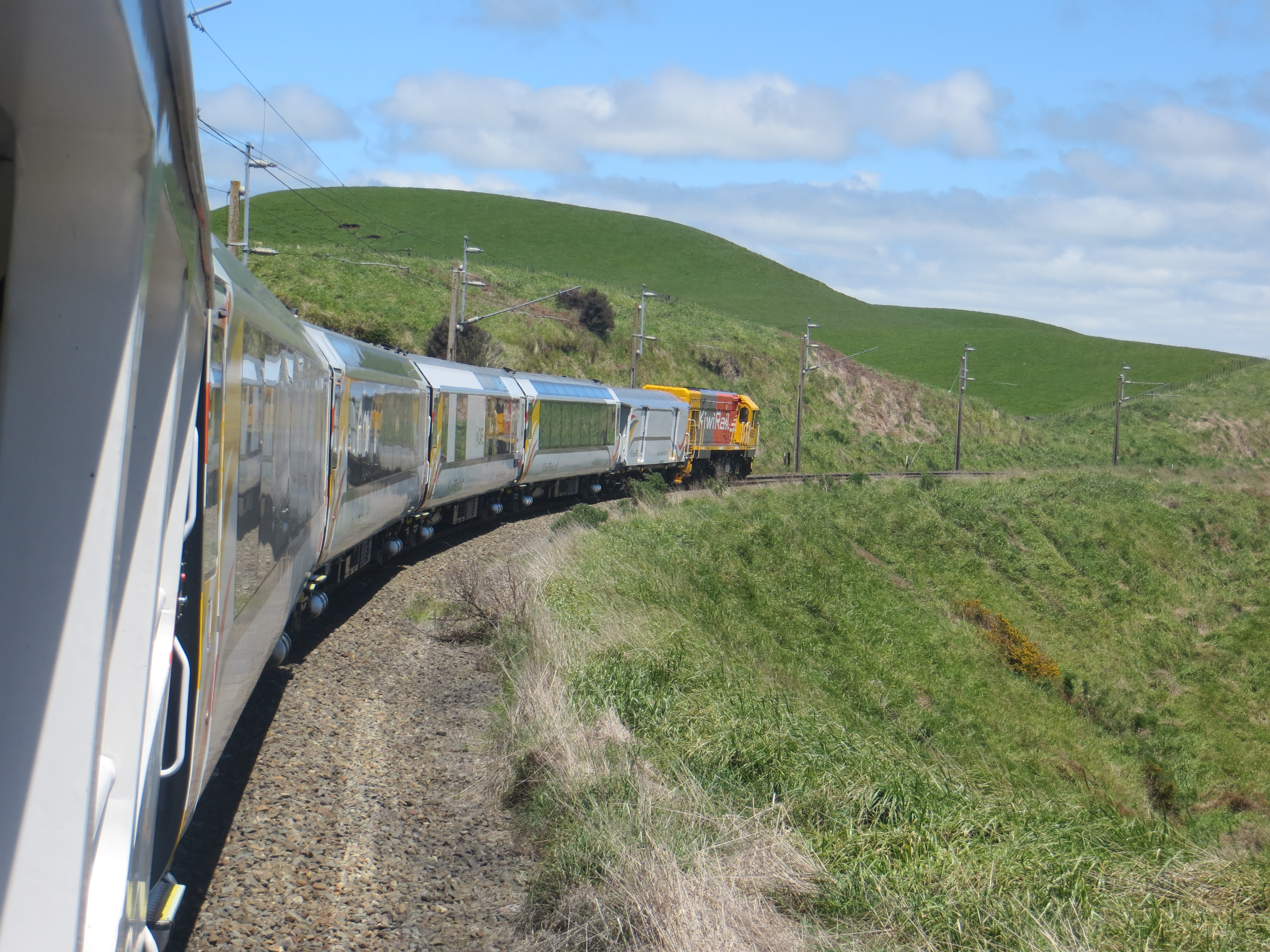
Northern Explorer near Waiouru

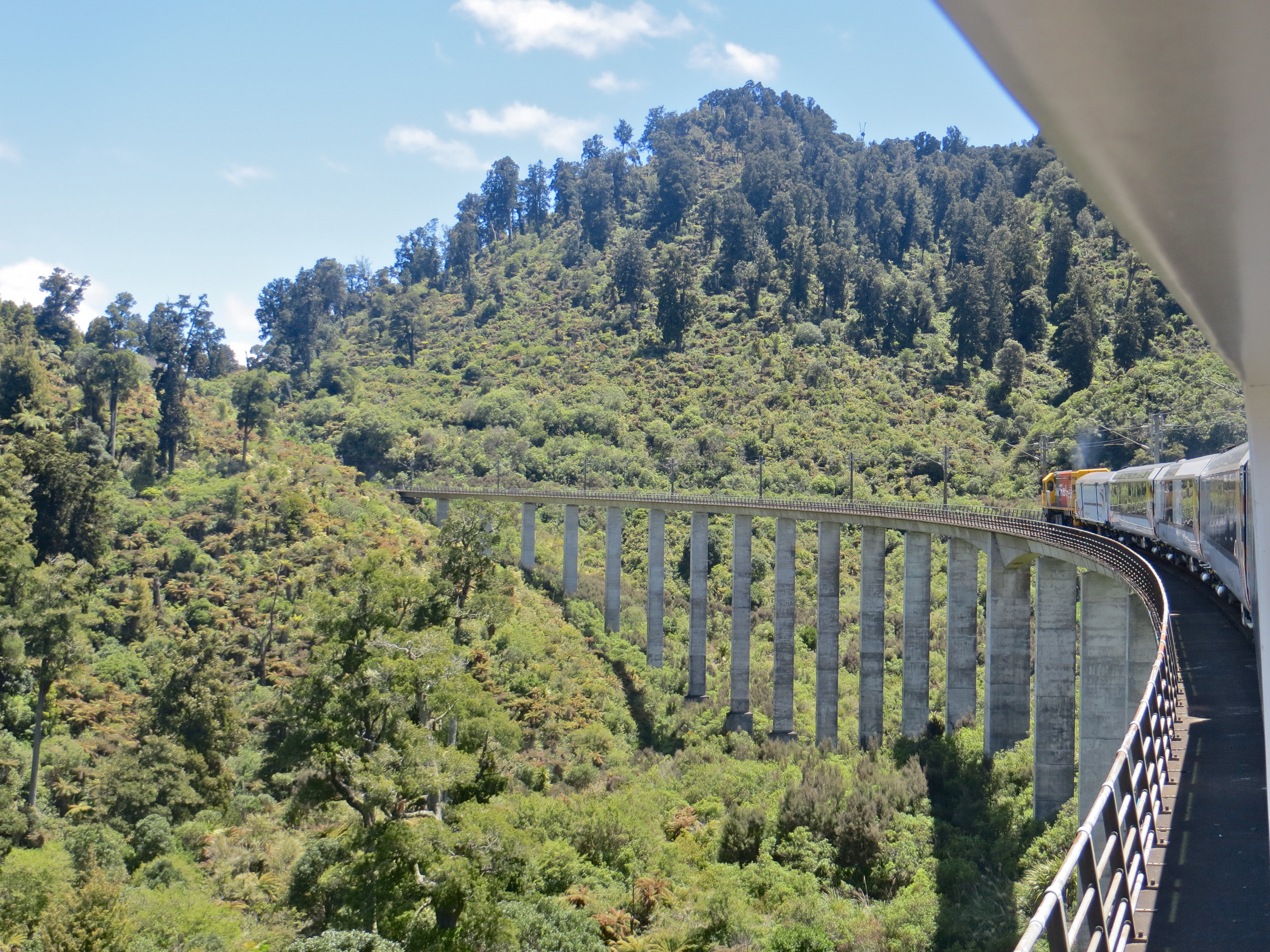
Hapuawhenua Viaduct, south of National Park

== Patronage ==
The Northern Explorer carried 39,419 passengers in the year to 30 June 2014; about 1,500 more than in 2012–13, but almost 23,000 fewer than the Overlander in 2011–12. Numbers rose 71% from 2013 to 2018, or about 65,000 a year and slightly more than the Overlander numbers.

== Service ==
In 2025, the Northern Explorer runs alternate days: on three days per week southbound and on three days per week northbound. On Sundays, there is no service, nor will be trains from 23 December 2025 to 13 January 2026. And there will be three more interruptions each year of about half a week for scheduled track maintenance.

== Former stops ==
The Northern Explorer served the stations shown at the foot of this page. There were variations from 2012. Papakura and Paraparaumu were added on 15 October 2012. Otorohanga was added on 10 December 2012. The Auckland terminus was moved from Britomart to The Strand Station on 21 December 2015.

== See also ==
- Rail transport in New Zealand
- Great Journeys New Zealand
