= KiwiRail =

New Zealand state-owned rail and ferry operator

KiwiRail Holdings Limited
- Type: State-Owned Enterprise
- Industry: Rail transport, shipping, property management
- Predecessor: Toll NZ
- Founded: 1 July 2008
- Headquarters: Pipitea, Wellington, New Zealand
- Area served: New Zealand
- Key people: Peter Reidy (CEO), David McClean (Chair)
- Products: Great Journeys New Zealand
- Services: Rail freight Inter-island ferries Long-distance passenger rail
- Revenue: ▲NZ$682.9 million
- Operating income: ▲NZ$25.7 million (FY2018-19)
- Net income: ▲NZ-$324.9 million (FY2018-19)
- Number of employees: 4,213
- Divisions: Great Journeys New Zealand; KiwiRail Freight; Interislander; Property and Corporate; Infrastructure and Asset Management
- Subsidiaries: KiwiRail Limited
- Website: www.kiwirail.co.nz

KiwiRail Holdings Limited, trading as KiwiRail, is a New Zealand state-owned enterprise. As the largest rail transport operator in New Zealand, it owns and maintains the national rail network infrastructure. KiwiRail operates Interislander, Great Journeys New Zealand, Te Huia, Capital Connection, rail freight, and property services. It also provides infrastructure and engineering services for maintaining and improving the rail and ferry networks.

The New Zealand Railways Corporation makes approximately 18,400 hectares of railway land available to KiwiRail under a long-term lease.

KiwiRail Limited was created in 2008 when bought by the Crown from previous owners Toll NZ, and is a wholly owned subsidiary of KiwiRail, which was created in 2012.

== History ==
=== Background ===
Prior to the establishment of KiwiRail, rail transport in New Zealand had been under both public and private ownership. Government operators included the Public Works Department (1873–1880), New Zealand Railways Department (1880–1982), and the New Zealand Railways Corporation (1982–1990). New Zealand Rail Limited was split off from the Railways Corporation (which continued to own the land beneath the rail network) in 1990, privatised in 1993 and then renamed in October 1995 to Tranz Rail. In May 2004 Tranz Rail's rail, ferry and trucking operations were acquired by Toll Holdings and renamed Toll NZ, with the central government buying back the rail network outside of Auckland for $1 (the Auckland metro rail network had already been purchased by the government in 2001) on 1 July 2004. The rail network then came under the New Zealand Railways Corporation (trading as ONTRACK). As part of this acquisition, Toll agreed to pay ONTRACK "Track Access Charges" (TACs) in exchange for exclusive network access for 66 years, subject to a "use it or lose it" clause: if freight and passenger volumes fell below the 2002-2004 average for three or more years, Toll would lose its exclusive access to another operator. The agreement set a base track access fee but left future track access fees open to negotiation between ONTRACK and Toll. After several years of negotiations, the two parties could not come to an agreement on the amount that Toll should pay.

=== Establishment of KiwiRail ===
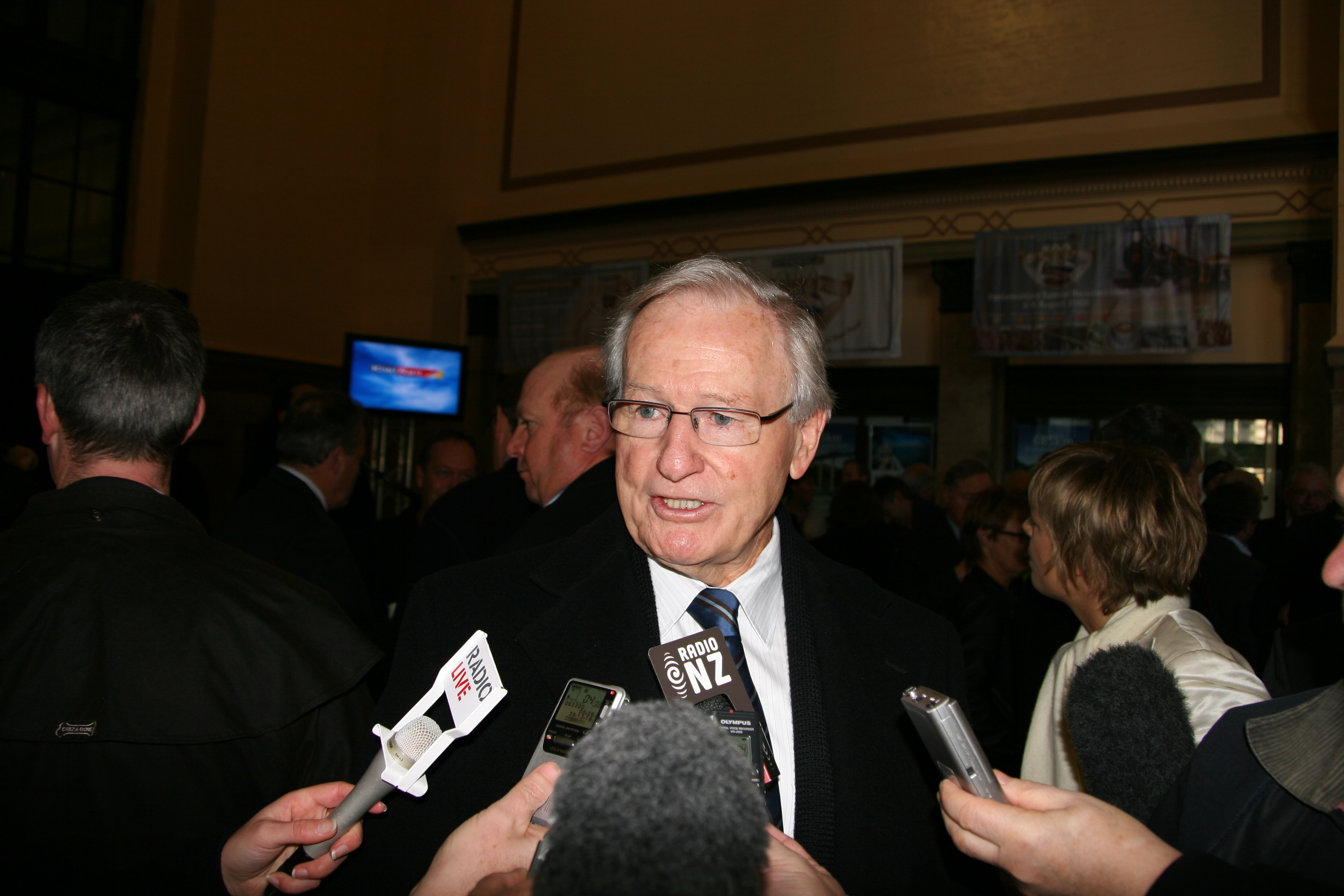
Former Prime Minister Jim Bolger at a press conference at the launch of KiwiRail, 1 July 2008

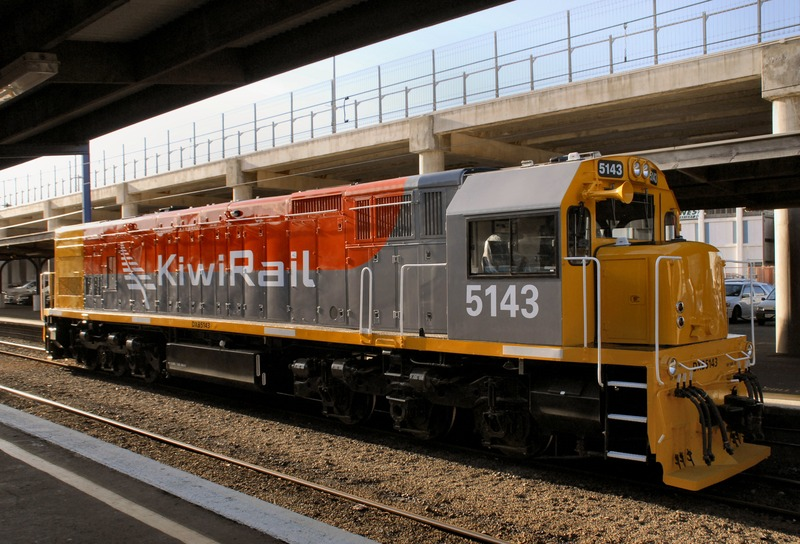
DXB 5143 stands at Wellington railway station platform 9 on 1 October 2008, at the official launch of KiwiRail by Prime Minister of New Zealand Helen Clark. This was the first locomotive to be painted in the KiwiRail livery.

On 1 July 2008, the government announced a $690 million purchase of Toll Rail—the rail and ferry assets of Toll NZ, but not its trucking operation, which continued under the Toll brand. The new company was named KiwiRail and launched on 1 October 2008 at a ceremony at Wellington railway station. The New Zealand Railways Corporation then owned both KiwiRail and ONTRACK, with both companies merging to create one company that controls both rail and ferry operations and rail infrastructure.

Former Prime Minister Jim Bolger became the first chair of the KiwiRail board, a position he held until 1 July 2010. Bolger's government had privatised New Zealand Rail Limited in 1993. A number of commentators, including Winston Peters, view this as ironic. In response, Bolger acknowledged his involvement in privatising New Zealand Rail, remarking that "my life is full of ironies," and added that "the world has changed."

=== Splitting of land and operations ===
In 2011, KiwiRail proposed splitting its land and rail corridor assets from its rail operation assets. On 27 June 2012 it was announced by the company that the value of the land and rail operations would be written down from NZ$7.8 billion to $1.3 billion, and KiwiRail would continue as the rail and ferry operator, while the New Zealand Railways Corporation would manage KiwiRail's land. The de-merger took effect on 31 December 2012.

=== 10-year turnaround plan ===
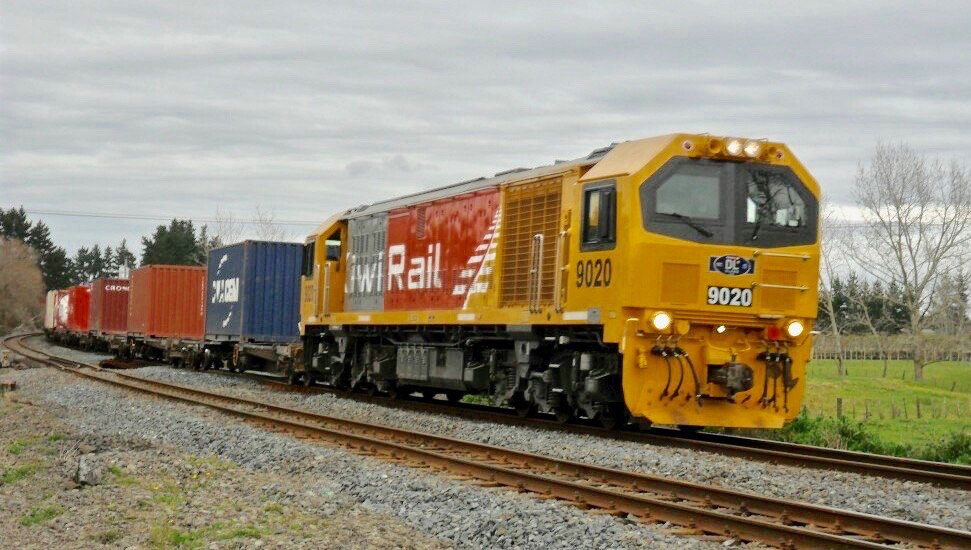
A new DL class locomotive (9020), purchased as part of KiwiRail's turnaround plan

In 2010 KiwiRail released a 10-year turnaround plan and significant government investment in support of this in the years following. In support of the turn-around plan, from July 2008 to December 2016 KiwiRail received over $2.1 billion of Crown investment, which was mostly spent on infrastructure and new rolling stock.

The focus of the Plan is to increase rail traffic volumes, revenue and productivity, modernise assets and separate out the commercial elements of the business from the non-commercial.

The plan included the following points:

- "Step change" on the Auckland – Wellington – Christchurch trunk route:
  - Reduce transit time and improve reliability along the route by easing curves, removing speed restrictions, greater investment in renewal of bridges and sleepers and passing loops. An express freight train journey between Auckland and Wellington took thirteen and a half hours. KiwiRail aimed to reduce transit times to 11 hours.
  - Improve exit and entry from Auckland and Wellington with improvements at terminals and on main lines to reduce transit times and conflicts with commuter services
  - Increase ferry rail-freight capacity by extending the length of the Aratere (achieved 2011) and make the Kaitaki rail-capable (idea since abandoned)
- Improve reliability, capacity and enabling investment:
  - Increased renewals on "other key routes", including investment in sleeper replacement, bridge strengthening and track formation refurbishment.
  - Improved IT systems and processes, equipment and facilities at terminals
  - New locomotives (see DL class) (48 in service by 2017) and 3,000 new wagons (over 1,000 in service by 2017).
- Review of minor lines (close or mothball if no anchor customers emerge):
  - North Auckland Line (partial mothball 2016)
  - Stratford–Okahukura Line (mothballed 2009)
  - Napier – Gisborne Line (partial mothballed 2012)
  - North Wairarapa line (from Masterton to Pahiatua; mothballed).
- Clarify and assign costs associated with Auckland and Wellington metro services (resulting in Tranz Metro assets being transferred to the Greater Wellington Regional Council and contracts for running services being made "contestable", as in Auckland.

Two of KiwiRail's major customers, Mainfreight and Fonterra, invested heavily in rail-related infrastructure in line with the Turnaround Plan. Mainfreight has allocated $60 million for investment in new railhead depots, while Fonterra has invested $130 million in a new rail hub complex in Hamilton and another in Mosgiel.

The plan has had mixed success, with company Chairman John Spencer stating in 2013 that for its first three years, rail freight revenue had increased by over 25%. Similar progress in attaining new customers and increasing freight volumes has been made over the life of the Plan to date (other than with coal).

Steady and at times rapid progress has been made on the enabling parts of the Turnaround Plan, such as new locomotives and wagons, lengthening of the rail ferry and track destressing, but not always effectively.

The 10 Year Turnaround Plan was quickly undermined by a series of adverse events, including:

- Earthquakes: 2010 Canterbury earthquake, 2011 Christchurch earthquake, and the 2016 Kaikōura earthquake, resulting in significant infrastructure damage and closure of the Christchurch to Picton line from November 2016 to 15 September 2017
- Lengthy severing of the rail ferry link between the North and South Islands when the Aratere lost a propeller in 2013
- Significant and lengthy problems with the new DL class locomotives
- Pike River Mine disaster, leading to the mine's closure and the loss of revenue that had been anticipated from coal freight
- International coal price collapse
- Solid Energy, the largest NZ coal mining company, entering voluntary administration in 2015. This was the culmination of a downturn that had begun to appear in 2012–13: significantly less coal being moved from West Coast mines
- Major rebuilding after fire damage and seven week closure of key freight route Midland line in 2017

=== 2017 update of the Turnaround Plan ===
Partially as a response to the events outlined above, in the 2017 budget the government announced a further $450 million in capital funding for KiwiRail, and that the company's operations would be placed under another major review, believed to relate to future funding models. The $450 million was earmarked for repairs following the 2016 Kaikōura earthquake and for further locomotive and rolling stock purchases. As part of the Turnaround Plan's agenda to standardise locomotives and wagons, in 2016 KiwiRail announced it would effectively switch off the NIMT electrification in late 2017 and replace the electric locomotives with an additional eight DL locomotives (additional to the 15 as reported in the 2016 Annual Report).

On 30 October 2018 that capital funding was made available to by the new Labour-led Coalition government to refurbish 15 of the surviving 20 EF locomotives at the Hutt Workshops extending the service life by 10 years for their continued use, in line with the Governments energy and emissions policies, and while the government is also actively considering extending the North Island electrification for the first time since the 1980s.

KiwiRail has made use of the Government's Provincial Growth Fund (PGF). In 2019 KiwiRail signed an agreement with the New Zealand Transport Agency, Palmerston North City Council to construct a road, rail and air distribution centre in Palmerston North, following a $40 million allocation to KiwiRail from the PGF.

=== New Zealand Rail Plan ===
In 2019, the government began a "Future of Rail" review, and in December 2019 released a draft New Zealand Rail Plan, outlining changes it proposed making to the rail transport industry and KiwiRail specifically. The draft plan proposes a number of major changes, the most significant being future funding of the rail network through the National Land Transport Fund, and charging rail operators to use the rail network via Track Access Charges. A number of other projects are proposed under the draft plan. They include a new train control centre in Auckland, replacing two Interislander ferries and rolling stock.

On 17 March 2020 KiwiRail released a tender for the supply of new mainline locomotives. 2021 New Zealand budget allocated NZD$722.7 million to purchase new mainline locomotives, shunt locomotives and wagons. In October 2021, Stadler Rail announced it had won the contract to supply 57 new locomotives for KiwiRail. Stadler Rail stated the contract was worth 228 million Euros, or NZD$403 million.

The 2022 budget allocated $661.5 million to KiwiRail, with $312.3 million for improving the national rail network and $349.2 million for completing the replacement of "ageing" locomotives and freight wagons, including up to 29 new light-duty locomotives. The total government investment increases to $8.6 billion.

== KiwiRail business units ==
=== Freight ===
KiwiRail Freight is the company's largest business unit, making up the majority of KiwiRail's revenue with $390 million in the financial year ended July 2016. In the same year, KiwiRail moved around 18 million tonnes of freight and carried about 16% of New Zealand's total freight task (tonnes-km). Traffic grew from 2017 to 2019, dropped sharply during the COVID-19 pandemic and largely recovered in 2022.

Freight types: Timber and dairy products formed 60% of the tonnage moved in 2022. Bulk commodities include coal, logs, milk (dry and wet), IMEX (import/export intermodal) and domestic intermodal freight. Formerly large scale freight types such as petroleum products have entirely been withdrawn, and fertiliser has almost disappeared. The freight trading revenue by sector, as per the December 2016 Half Year Report is:

- Domestic 27%
- Bulk 19%
- Forestry 15%
- Import/Export 39%

Rail freight depots: KiwiRail has a total of 17 rail freight depots. In the North Island, these are Whangārei, Auckland, Hamilton, Tauranga, New Plymouth, Napier, Whanganui, Palmerston North, Masterton and Wellington. In the South Island they are Blenheim, Christchurch, Ashburton, Timaru, Oamaru, Dunedin, and Invercargill.

Inland Ports: KiwiRail serves a number of Inland Port yards, although does not own the tracks. These include Conlinxx (Wiri), Midland Port (Rolleston), Longburn International Freight Hub (Longburn, Palmerston North), Manawatu Inland Port (Palmerston North), MetroPort (Southdown in Auckland and Rolleston in Christchurch) and will include Ruakura (Hamilton) when it opens in 2019, and Ports of Auckland's site at Horotiu in Hamilton.

Sea Ports: KiwiRail has major freight yards and sidings at Lyttelton port Company (containers, logs, coal), Port Chalmers (containers), Southport (Bluff), Timaru, Port of Tauranga (Mt Maunganui and Sulphur Point), Ports of Auckland, CentrePort (Wellington), Port of Napier and New Plymouth. KiwiRail also has a joint venture with the Northland Regional Council to build a branch line (the Marsden Point Branch) to connect to Northport at Marsden Point.

Anchor freight customers: Key anchor customers include Fonterra, Westland Dairy Products (Rolleston and Hokitika), Bathurst resources and the various freight forwarders including Mainfreight and port companies including Port of Tauranga.

Freight wagons: KiwiRail operates 4,855 wagons. An additional 120 wagons were acquired in the year ending 2016, with over 1,000 new wagons added since 2008. One of KiwiRail's stated aims is to progressively move towards standardised wagons, with the container flat-top being overwhelmingly the dominant type (carrying curtain sided swap bodies, liquid containers, Log cradles and so on to meet almost all freight tasks). The Norwegian coupling is progressively being replaced with semi-automatic Janney coupler on all wagons.

Key freight routes:

- Auckland – Christchurch: domestic general freight, mostly via 10 ft, 20 ft and 40 ft containers and curtain-siders or box wagons.
- Auckland – Tauranga: Containerised and bulk export products
- Kinleith/Murapara – Mount Maunganui: wood products only
- Midland Line: Bulk export coal from north of Westport and Reefton, coal containers for Fonterra, dry and wet milk between Westland Dairy plants at Hokitika and Rolleston, export dry milk from Fonterra at Darfield.
- Edendale – Taieri – Port Chalmers: export milk powder in containers.
- Wairio – Invercargill: solely coal in containers for Fonterra use.
- Invercargill – Bluff: run as a 'shunt', sole freight is exports to Southport.

=== Interislander ===
Re-branded along with KiwiRail Scenic Journeys as the single brand Great Journeys New Zealand in 2017, the Interislander is the company's second largest business unit. It operates ferry services across Cook Strait between Wellington in the North Island and Picton in the South Island. In the financial year 2012, $123.9 million of KiwiRail's revenue came from the Interislander, with the majority of the Interislander's revenue coming from rail and road freight transport.

=== Property and Corporate ===
KiwiRail is a major land owner in New Zealand, and manages over 18 thousand hectares of land, has in excess of 1,500 property assets with a combined value of over $965 million (Annual Report 2016). Increasingly, KiwiRail is pursuing a commercial approach to asset management, and in the 2016 financial year received over $18 million from property sales.

=== Great Journeys New Zealand ===
Re-branded along with Interislander as the single brand The Great Journeys of New Zealand in 2017, it is the long-distance passenger transport subsidiary of KiwiRail, operating the Northern Explorer, TranzAlpine and Coastal Pacific. The passenger trains are predominantly patronised by tourists to NZ, with the exception of the Capital Connection, which is a commuter train.

In 2012, KiwiRail attempted to sell Tranz Scenic, but was unsuccessful, and KiwiRail continues to run these services. The division is now experiencing rapid double-digit annual growth, due to the growth of Chinese tourism to New Zealand, to the point where KiwiRail in 2017 may purchase an additional eight carriages to the 17 AK carriages purchased in 2012.

In 2021, following a decline in tourism during the COVID-19 pandemic, KiwiRail announced the suspension of the Coastal Pacific and Northern Explorer as part of Project Restart '22. However these are now running again While it is currently, as of January 2022, unclear what direction KiwiRail intends to take, Project Restart suggests a shift to multi-day land-cruises, a form of Experiential tourism. This decision, or potential decision, has been seen by many New Zealand-based transport advocacy groups as an abandonment of interregional rail by KiwiRail. Campaign for Better Transport described it as the "latest stage in the decline of what was once an extensive passenger rail service which serviced most of New Zealand". An announcement is expected by July 2022.

=== Tranz Metro ===
Until 2016, KiwiRail division Tranz Metro had the contract to operate the Wellington services but lost a bid to renew this contract in 2015. KiwiRail is sub-contracted by Transdev Wellington to provide and operate the diesel locomotives required to haul the Wairarapa Connection service.

Suburban rail passenger operations in Auckland and Wellington are contracted by their respective local governments and not operated by KiwiRail. In Auckland rolling stock is owned by Auckland Transport which has contracted operation to Auckland One Rail, while in Wellington rolling stock is owned by Greater Wellington Regional Council which has contracted operation to Transdev Wellington.

=== Infrastructure and Asset Management ===
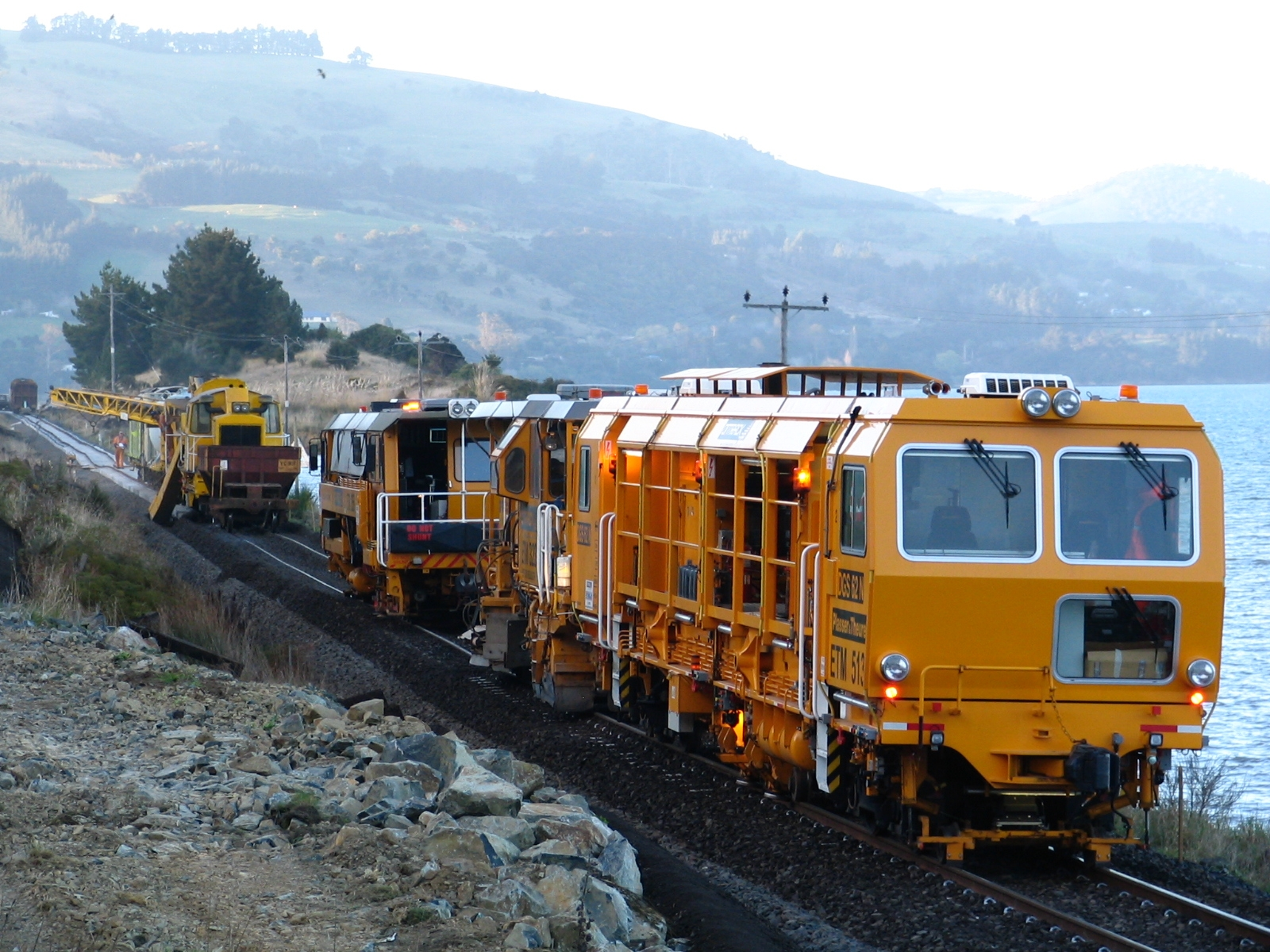
KiwiRail Network replacing sleepers on the Main South Line at Blueskin Bay, Otago. Closest machine is a dynamic track stabiliser, followed by a Regulator, then a Continuous Action Tamper.

The KiwiRail Infrastructure and Engineering division, formerly known as ONTRACK, has three main areas of operation:

- Development, maintenance and operation of all of New Zealand's main-line rail infrastructure (see List of New Zealand railway lines).
- Provides rail operators with access to the rail network in return for the payment of track access charges.
- Rail network controller, providing services such as train control and signalling.

The network it is responsible for consists of:

- Route length: 3,898 kilometres (2,422 mi)
- Tunnels: 148
- Bridges: 2,191
- Electrification: 95 km at 1.5 kV DC (Wellington area), 411 km at 25 kV 50 Hz AC (NIMT central section)

==== Engineering ====
The Engineering division provides mechanical assistance to the Freight and Passenger businesses, as well as to Auckland Transport. Engineering maintains, refurbishes and occasionally builds rolling stock for the network.

In 2012, KiwiRail announced it was putting its Hillside Engineering division on the market. and subsequently sold part of the division and transferred remaining work to Hutt workshops.

KiwiRail now operates the Hutt Workshops in the Hutt Valley of Wellington, along with a number of small wagon maintenance depots, for example, at Addington (Christchurch) and Frankton.

==== Stabling yards ====
Most rail operations are a 'there and back' service with motive power being held in a few key strategic locations. Motive power stabling yards are as follows:

- Westfield (Auckland)
- Frankton (Hamilton)
- Palmerston North
- Thorndon (Wellington)
- Middleton (Christchurch)
- Dunedin

==== Yards and facilities ====
Some of the more prominent rail facilities used by KiwiRail include:

- Westfield, Auckland (adjacent to the closed Westfield station and near Westfield Junction)
- Southdown, Auckland
- Te Rapa, Fonterra bulk store yard, Hamilton
- Mount Maunganui
- Wellington
- Picton, Marlborough (solely used for marshaling wagons for rail ferry)
- Spring Creek (serves as rail head for Nelson)
- Middleton, Christchurch (largest yard in South Island)
- Dunedin
- Taieri, Fonterra bulk store facility, Mosgiel

==== Current rolling stock fleet ====
===== Locomotives =====
The table below lists only the current locomotives in service with KiwiRail. In 2024 KiwiRail had 196 locomotives of 6 classes, with a combined tractive power of 311 MW (417,000 hp). By 2028 it is planned to have 144 of 4 classes, with a combined power of 351 MW (471,000 hp) and a further reduction to 130 by 2030.

Image	Class	Introduced	Number in class	Number in service	Power output (kW)	Notes
	DC	1978–1983	85	16	1230	Mainline diesel-electric. Fifty-two scrapped, six preserved, six sold overseas, 2 sold at auction and three stored. Sixteen classed as DCP.
	DF	1979–1981	30	29	1800	Mainline diesel-electric. Sub-classes: DFB (21) and DFT (9). Two under overhaul to DFB, and one scrapped.
	DH	1978-1979	6	6	672	Heavy shunting locomotive.
	DL	2010–2023	73	58	2700	Mainline diesel-electric.
	DSC	1959–1967	70	27	315	Light shunting. Thirty-four scrapped, two preserved, three stored and three owned by industrial owners.
	DSG	1981-1983	24	24	700	Heavy shunting. One under overhaul.
	DSH	2027 (planned)				New heavy shunting locomotives, under order from Stadler Rail
	DSJ	1984-1985	5	4	350	Light shunting.
	DX	1972–1976	49	47	2240	Mainline diesel-electric. One scrapped, one stored, and two under overhaul. Sub-classes: DXB (14), DXC (32), DXR (2).
	EF	1988–1989	22	14	3000	25 kV AC electric locomotives. Four stored, four scrapped and two under overhaul.
	DM	2024	66	4	3000	New mainline locomotives. Two in service, remainder on order from Stadler Rail
	TR	1936–1978	90	17	138	Light shunting, positioned in smaller yards and leased to industrial customers. Forty-four scrapped, twenty-eight preserved and one stored.

===== Carriages =====
The majority of passenger carriages in New Zealand are now owned by Auckland Transport, Greater Wellington Regional Council and Dunedin Railways. KiwiRail operates a small fleet of New Zealand built AK class carriages for long-distance passenger trains and heavily rebuilt former British Mark 2 carriages in several configurations, the S class carriages for the Palmerston North-Wellington Capital Connection and the SR class carriages, which KiwiRail owns and leases for the Te Huia Hamilton to Auckland regional service. Twelve carriages are also being overhauled to replace the current S class carriages and will be deployed in two sets of six.

Image	Class	Number in class	In service	Passenger capacity	Notes
	AK carriage	17	2012–present	AK 63; AKC 10	Used on the Tranz Alpine, Coastal Pacific, Northern Explorer services
	SR class carriages	12	2021–present	SR x6 seat 50, SRC x3 seat 20 and SRV x3 seat 38	Used on Te Huia service, Capital Connection services

== See also ==
- Rail transport in New Zealand
