= New Zealand AK class carriage =

New Zealand AK class
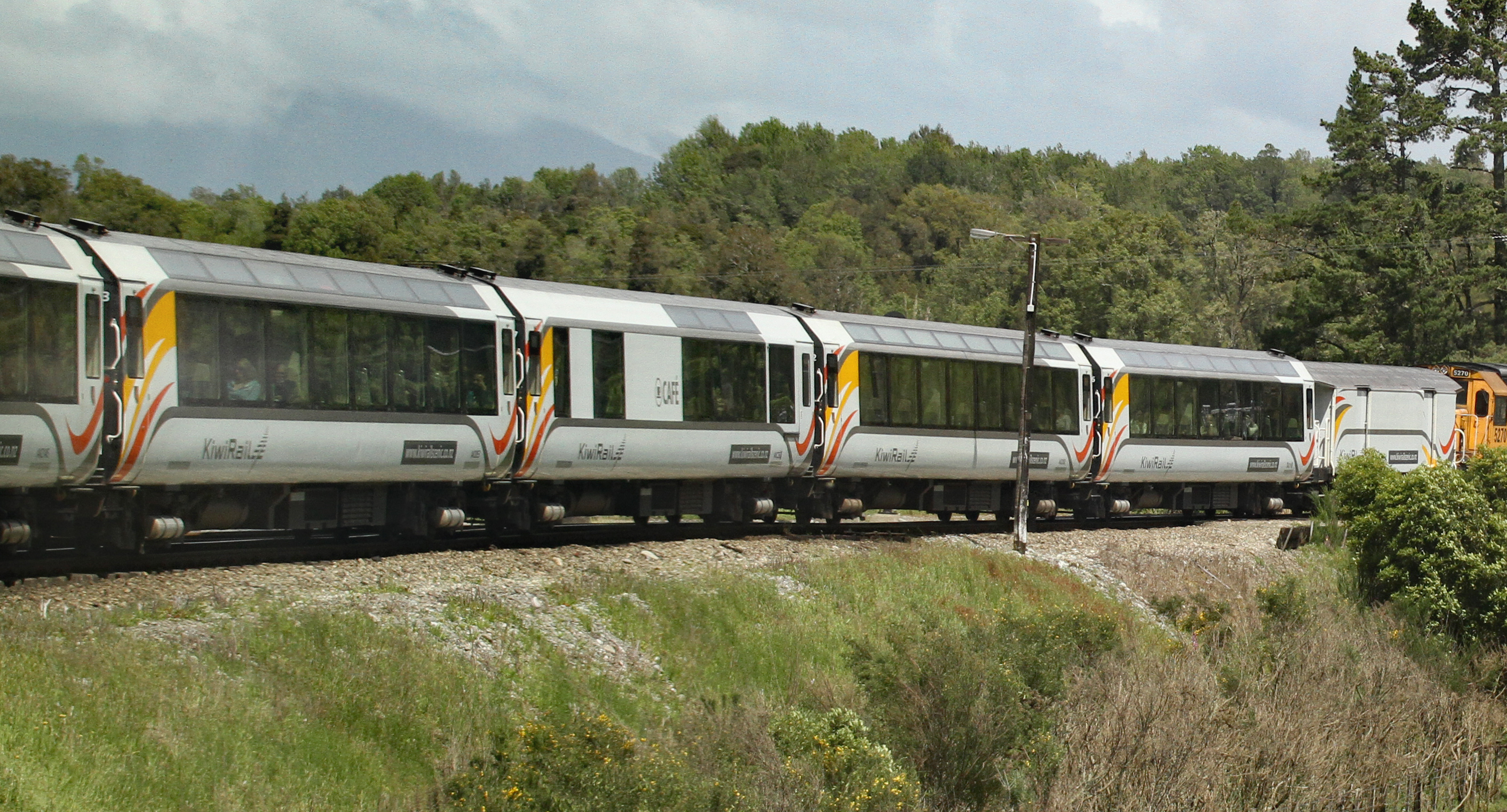
- AK class carriages on a TranzAlpine service

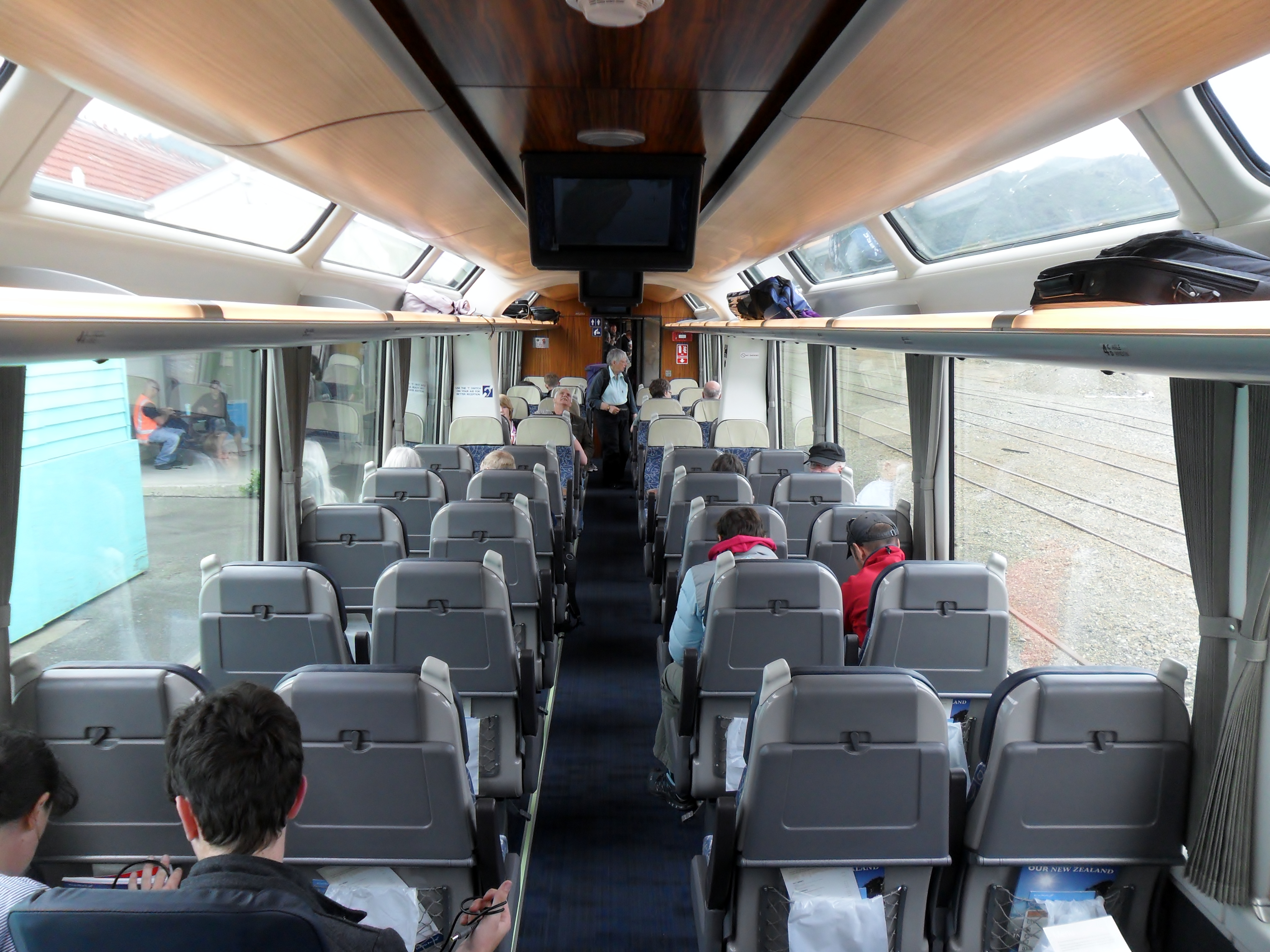
- Interior
- In service: 2 November 2011
- Manufacturer: Hillside Engineering
- Constructed: 2010–2012
- Number built: 17
- Number in service: 17
- Fleet numbers: AK, AKC (cafe) AKP (Scenic Plus)
- Capacity: 63 (AK car); 10 (AKC car)
- Operators: The Great Journeys of New Zealand
- Depots: Waltham depot (Christchurch), Westfield (Auckland)
- Lines served: Main North Line, Midland Line; North Island Main Trunk

Specifications
- Car body construction: 19.53 m (64 ft 1 in)
- Car length: 20.38 m (66 ft 10 in) over couplers
- Width: 2.74 m (9 ft 0 in)
- Height: 3.72 m (12 ft 2 in)
- Doors: Four plug-type doors (AK car)
- Weight: AK: 37.4 t (36.8 long tons; 41.2 short tons); AKC: 37.4 t (36.8 long tons; 41.2 short tons)
- HVAC: Heating and air conditioning
- Track gauge: 3 ft 6 in (1,067 mm)

The New Zealand AK class carriage is a class of 17 cars built by Dunedin's Hillside Workshops for KiwiRail's long-distance passenger operation The Great Journeys of New Zealand. The class consists of 11 AK saloon carriages, three AKP Scenic Plus carriages and four AKC café carriages, supplemented by three AKL luggage vans and four AKV open-air viewing/generator vans converted from AG vans, similar to those previously used on the Coastal Pacific and the TranzAlpine. The AK class are the first new carriages to be built in New Zealand since 1943.

== Introduction ==
Two AK cars, one AKC car, one AKL car and an AKV car entered service on the Coastal Pacific on 2 November 2011.

The class is used on the Coastal Pacific, the Northern Explorer and the TranzAlpine, replacing panorama 56-foot carriages. Funding of $NZ39.9 million was announced by the fifth National government in March 2009.

The class features a new white livery with the KiwiRail logo.

Due to passenger loadings falling on both South Island trains as a result of the February 2011 Christchurch earthquake, three AK, one AKC, one AKL and one AKV were transferred to the North Island for the new three-times-a-week Auckland-Wellington Northern Explorer. In late 2018, the redistributed Coastal Pacific carriages were returned for the re-opening of the service in December 2018.

As part of the re-opening of the Coastal Pacific, the Government and KiwiRail announced new NZ$40 million carriage investment including new premium carriages. KiwiRail is considering converting some of the existing AK carriages to Premium Carriages.

== Design ==
The class was designed by KiwiRail's mechanical design staff in Wellington. It has GPS-triggered announcements, with displays on ceiling-mounted screens and commentary at each seat in five languages: English, French, German, Japanese and Mandarin. It runs on newly designed air-cushioned P11 bogies. Seating was supplied by a Wellington-based manufacturer.

With large panoramic windows and quarter lights in the roof, the area of glass per AK car is 52 m^{2} (560 sq ft). To one side of each seat is a jack for headphones for the on-board commentary, and in front of each seat is a flip-down tray table. Seats facing each other in groups of four are positioned around a fixed table. Power points are provided at each seat area. Carry-on baggage can be stored overhead.

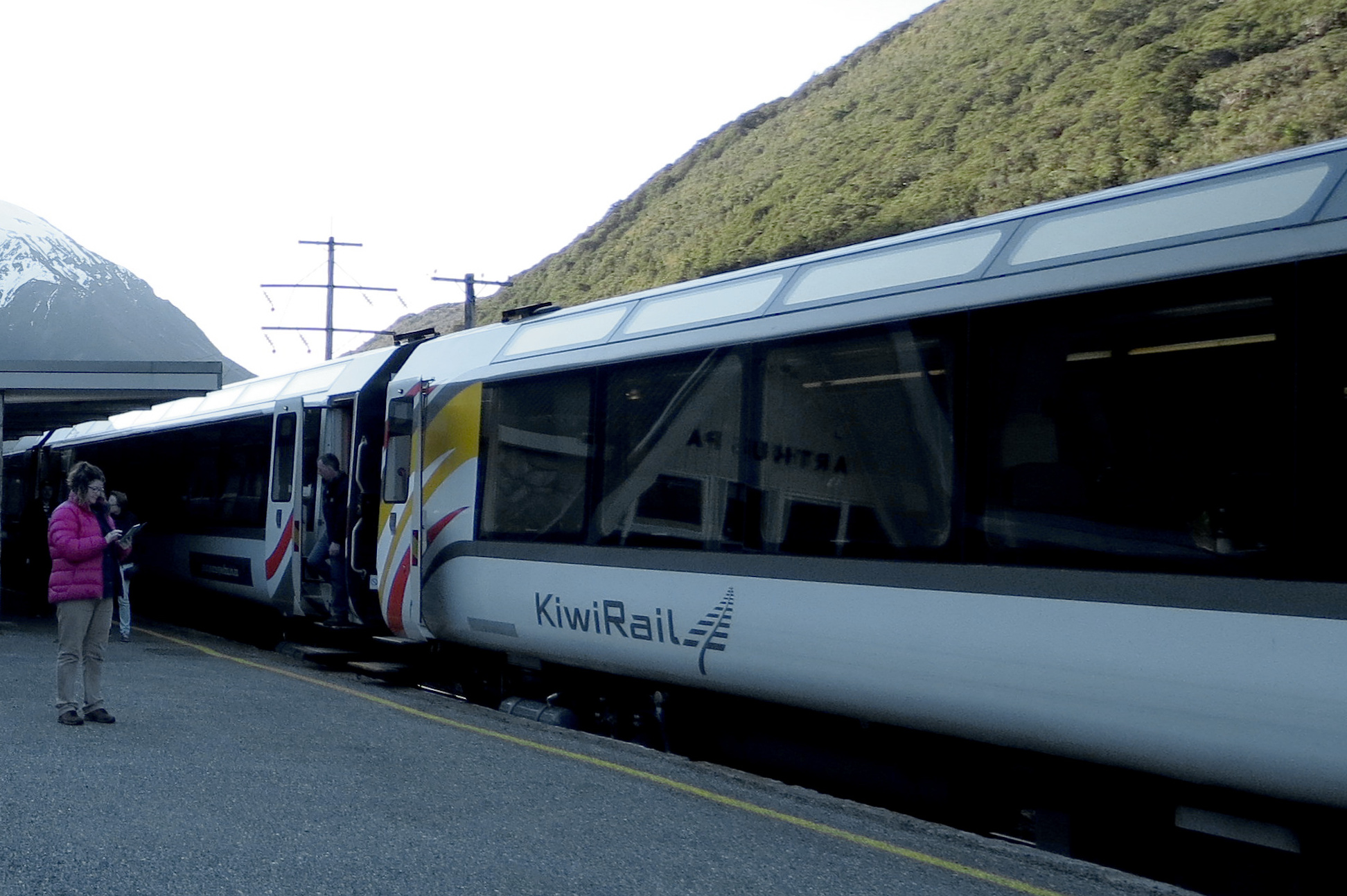
AK carriages on a TranzAlpine service

== Support vehicles ==
=== AKS ===
In March 2018 it was reported that two SA carriages were being overhauled and converted into luggage vans for KiwiRail Scenic Journeys. This was later revised to three SA carriage conversions into AKS luggage vans of six SA carriages moved to Hutt Workshops. The new AKS vans are fitted with a crew compartment, luggage and bicycle racks, recycling and catering storage.

=== AKF ===
In 2023, a kitchen carriage, AKF6112 on the Tranz Alpine using SA carriages overhauled and converted into kitchen carriages by KiwiRail's Hutt Workshops for their "Scenic Plus" dining experience. Two other SA carriages are being overhauled as AKF kitchen carriages for the Northern Explorer and Coastal Pacific services.

=== AKV ===
Four AKV open-air viewing/generator vans have been converted from AG vans, which in turn were converted from FM guards vans dating from the late 1970s and early 1980s.
