= New Zealand DC class locomotive =

Class of 85 diesel-electric locomotive

New Zealand DC class
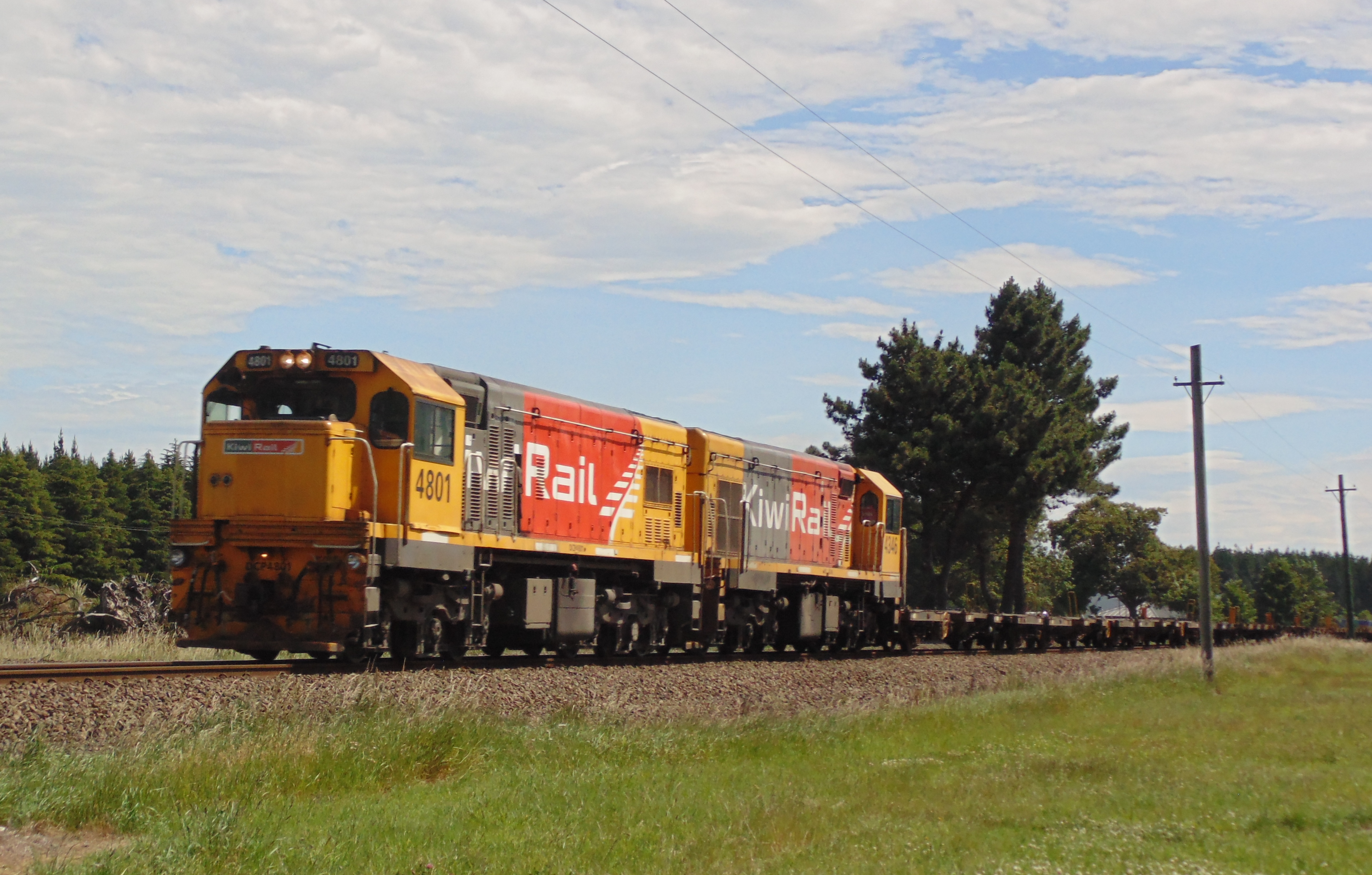
- DCP4801 and DC4346 with a mainline shunt approaching Templeton south of Christchurch
Type and origin
- Power type: Diesel-electric
- Builder: General Motors Canada
- Model: EMD G22AR
- Build date: 1961–1967 as D^{A} class
- Rebuilder: Clyde Engineering, Rosewater; Hutt Workshops
- Rebuild date: 1977–1982
- Number rebuilt: 85
Specifications
- Configuration
  - UIC: A1A-A1A
- Gauge: 3 ft 6 in (1,067 mm)
- Wheel diameter: 1.25 metres (4 ft 1 in)
- Length: 14.10 metres (46 ft 3 in)
- Width: 2.72 metres (8 ft 11 in)
- Height: 3.76 metres (12 ft 4 in)
- Adhesive weight: 60.0 tonnes (59.1 long tons; 66.1 short tons)
- Loco weight: 82.0 tonnes (80.7 long tons; 90.4 short tons)
- Fuel type: Diesel
- Prime mover: EMD 12-645C or EMD 12-645E
- RPM range: 900 rpm
- Engine type: V12 Diesel engine
- Aspiration: Normally aspirated (Roots blower)
- Cylinders: 12
- Cylinder size: 230 mm (9 1/16 in) x 250 mm (9.8 in)
Performance figures
- Maximum speed: 100 km/h (62 mph)
- Power output: 1,062 kW (1,424 hp) (645C); 1,230 kW (1,650 hp) (645E)
- Tractive effort: 140 kN (31,000 lb_{f})
Career
- Number in class: 85
- Numbers: DC4006–4951 (TMS); D^{C} 1551–1599 (original)
- First run: 18 March 1978 – 25 November 1983
- Disposition: In service: 16; Withdrawn: 5 Scrapped: 52; Preserved: 7 Sold overseas: 9

The New Zealand DC class locomotive (Note: Following the introduction of Traffic Monitoring System (TMS) in 1979, the class classification was capitalised, whereas previously the second letter was a smaller capital letter, that is D^{C}) is a type of diesel-electric mainline locomotive on the New Zealand rail network, operated by KiwiRail on freight trains, and formerly on long-distance passenger trains. The class was rebuilt from the D^{A} class in the late 1970s and early 1980s, in Australia (80 locomotives) and New Zealand (5 locomotives). After the DA class, they were the most numerous class of diesel locomotive on New Zealand's railway network and remained numerically dominant until the mid-2010s when withdrawals began.

== History ==
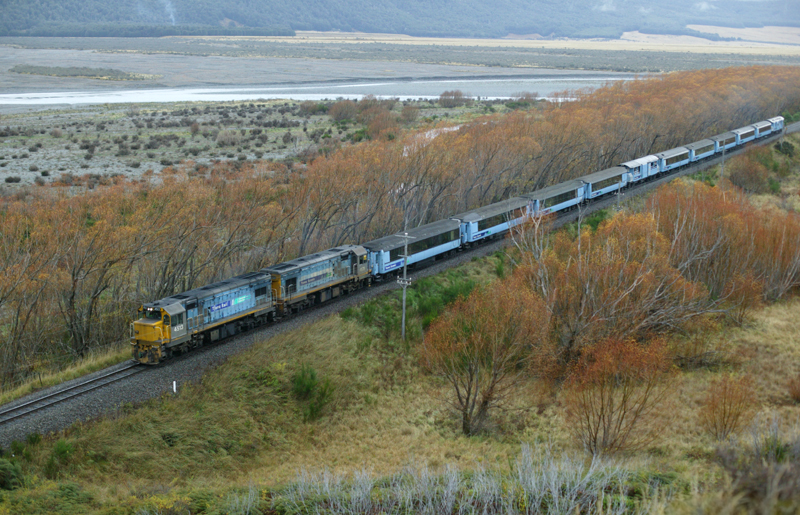
The TranzAlpine hauled by two DC class locomotives skirting the Waimakariri River

The locomotives were introduced as phase III and phase IV of the D^{A} class, built by General Motors Canada between 1961 and 1967. They were rebuilt between 1978 and 1983.

Because of a backlog of locomotives requiring heavy maintenance, Clyde Engineering were awarded a contract to rebuild 35 D^{A} class as EMD model G22ARs, with upgraded engines, new cabs and low short hoods of a style similar to the GE DX class introduced earlier in the 1970s and the EMD DF class being introduced at the time. The first few were shipped directly to Port Adelaide, but after the Union Company withdrew its roll-on/roll-off services, most were shipped to Melbourne's Appleton Dock and hauled to Adelaide via the 1,600 mm (5 ft 3 in) Victorian and South Australian lines.

Further contract extensions resulted in a total of 80 being rebuilt by Clyde Engineering. A further five were rebuilt at the Hutt Workshops near Wellington, but retained their existing engines.

== Technical details ==
Each locomotive has a General Motors 12-645C or 12-645E V12 diesel engine (the same as originally fitted to the DF class) and four traction motors, with an authorised maximum speed of 100 km/h. They are 14 metres long, 3.8 metres high and weigh 82 tonnes. They can be readily identified as they are considerably shorter than the DF and DX classes and have their paired headlights arranged horizontally, rather than vertically on the DFs.

The five 49-series Hutt-built DCs originally retained the 12-567 engine, before later receiving the 12-645.

== In service ==
=== History ===
The class was initially employed in the North Island, mainly on freight trains but also hauling either carriage trains or AC class Grassgrub depowered railcars.

Changes came during the 1980s; the deregulation of land transport saw rail freight volumes decline and the opening of the North Island Main Trunk electrification saw the locomotive fleet reallocated. These factors saw the withdrawal between 1985 and 1989 of the DJ class and remaining DA class, with the DC class also seeing service in the South Island for the first time. The locomotives were also used on export coal trains between the West Coast and Christchurch.

The class were used on KiwiRail Scenic's South Island Coastal Pacific, and was also used on the North Island's Northern Explorer until being replaced by a DFB/T, DXB or occasionally a DXC locomotive and on the TranzAlpine until being replaced by two DXC locomotives. A DC class locomotive was also occasionally used to haul the Capital Connection service.

The Northern Explorer's predecessor, the Overlander, was usually hauled on the northern and southern sections of the North Island Main Trunk by a DC class locomotive, and was often used across the central section as well if an EF locomotive was unavailable.

=== Cab concerns ===
In March 2001, the Rail & Maritime Transport Union threatened to set the maximum speed of the DC class to 50 kilometres per hour (31 mph) due to corrosion found on cab mounts. This causes the cab of a DC to detach from the frame during a derailment, and a driver had fallen through the floor of a locomotive. An audit was made on all locomotives and found 19 locomotives had maintenance concerns. The concerned locomotives were relegated to trail-only locomotives, and work was made in a short matter of time to repair the cabs. It was understood that the concerned locomotives would be fitted with universal cabs, but this never commenced.

In early 2017, concerns were raised by the RMTU surrounding rusty cab structures, cab mounting, and anti-collision posts. Fearing the cabs could have been ripped off in the course of an accident, all (but one) locomotives were banned from leading in the South Island; again confined to trail-only locomotives until they had been inspected. Although locomotives in the North Island were banned from leading trains, they were seen being used on shunts. Work was carried out at both Hutt and Hillside workshops; most were back leading trains within a couple of months.

=== Tranz Metro ===
The DC class were used to haul Wairarapa Connection services between Masterton and Wellington. The locomotives were allocated on a daily basis, rather than being permanently assigned as was the case in Auckland. In July 2015, the DFB class replaced the DC class hauling the service.

=== Australia ===
==== Tasmania ====
DC4588 was shipped to Tasmania (along with QR class locomotives) in December 1998 for use for TasRail, then part-owned by Tranz Rail and its parent Wisconsin Central through the Australian Transport Network. The locomotive was purchased outright by TasRail after an initial period used lease, but it was placed into storage in October 2002 after suffering an engine problem. In 2005, rebuilding commenced for reinstatement, but the rebuild fell through and the locomotive was sold for scrap in 2011 at East Tamar Workshops.

==== Queensland ====
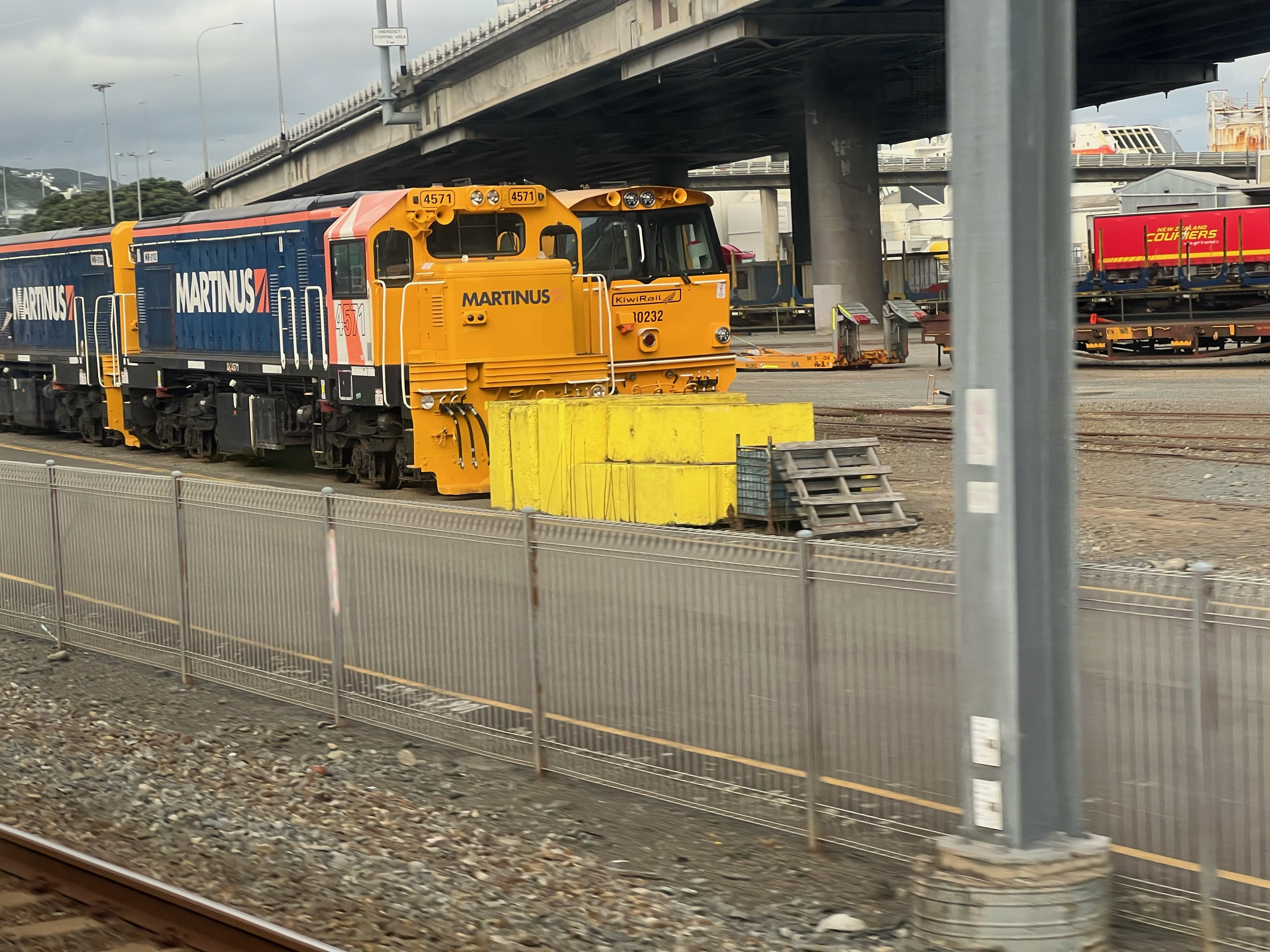
Martinus liveried engines at Wellington in January 2024

In 2020, six DC class locomotives were sold to Martinus Rail for use on construction trains on the Carmichael coal mine railway line from Abbot Point in Queensland, Australia. DCs 4041, 4444, 4571 and 4692 were overhauled and repainted at Hutt Workshops before being shipped to Brisbane, while DCs 4104 and 4634 were purchased for spare parts and scrapped. With the completion of the line, DCs 4444 and 4692 were sold to mine operator Bravus Mining in early 2022, for use on work trains. Martinus retained DCs 4041 and 4571. In late 2022, Martinus brought the locomotives it had retained back to New Zealand, and modified their liveries to comply with New Zealand railway regulations. They were subsequently exported to Zambia in April 2024.

=== Auckland Transport ===
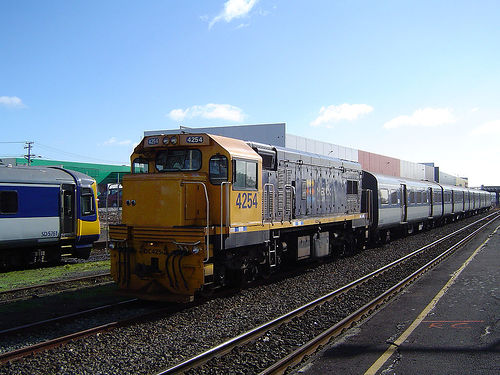
DC4254 in service for ARTA (now Auckland Transport) at Papakura in April 2006.

For several years, the DC class were employed on suburban carriage trains in Auckland. From 2003, the operation has been run under a service contract by Transdev Auckland and its predecessors, through firstly the former Auckland Regional Transport Authority (ARTA) and then through the Auckland Council subsidiary Auckland Transport.

Until July 2015, up to 20 DC class and DCP class locomotives, along with three DFB/T class locomotives, were leased to Auckland Transport, operating in push-pull mode with Auckland Transport's ex British Rail Mark 2 SA/SD carriages. Originally, the DC locomotives were configured with a set of three SA cars and an SD driving car, but with an increase in rail patronage some longer trains were provided on the Southern and Eastern lines with the addition of a fourth SA car. 17 DC class locomotives were painted in the MAXX blue livery, with four other locomotives that saw regular service with AT – DC4104, DC4260, DC4346 and DCP4818 – in KiwiRail livery, along with DC4594 which was Toll-livered at the time. All locomotives in service with Auckland Transport were fitted with controls for the carriage doors and later received Electronic Train Protection (ETP) equipment. One of the MAXX-painted locomotives, DC4732, was heavily damaged when it derailed at Westfield as an empty service on 2 March 2014.

Following the availability of sufficient numbers of the electric AM class EMUs to operate the Auckland network, the diesel locomotives were returned to KiwiRail, with a number of them being stored at Hutt Workshops.

=== Southern Africa ===
DC4191 and DC4847 were sold for use on Namibia's narrow-gauge railway in 2021. On 19 November 2021, both locomotives were trucked to the Port of Auckland's Bledisloe Wharf for export to South Africa and then on to Namibia.

DC4346, DC4409 and accident-damaged locomotives DC4605 and DC4726, together with the two Martinus Rail locomotives, DC4041 and DC4571, were exported to Zambia in April 2024.

=== Current ===
As of 2026, sixteen DC class locomotives remain in service, nine in the North Island and seven in the South Island.

Although now substantially reduced in numbers, the DC class continues to be a workhorse, operating either as single locomotives or in multiple with other DC locomotives or locomotives from the DFT, DX or DL classes.

== Numbering ==
Initially, the class was numbered sequentially from D^{C} 1551 (the D^{A} class having ended at 1545, the D^{F} class started at 1651). In 1979 the computerised Traffic Monitoring System (TMS) was introduced and the class was renumbered with a four-digit number commencing with '4', with the last digit a check digit. The 49 Clyde-built locomotives were renumbered in sequence with D^{C} 1551 becoming DC4006 and D^{C} 1599 becoming DC4536, though only the first 31 (up to D^{C} 1581) had entered service by that time. The remaining Clyde builds received TMS numbers through to 4876 as they entered the rebuilding, while D^{C} 1582–1589 entered service with their original 15xx series numbers on the headlight number boards and the later 40xx TMS numbers on the long hood.

Initially, the Hutt-built locomotives retained their DA-sequence TMS numbers, as NZR considered them to be DA locomotives as they retained the 12-567 engine. Eventually, this decision was changed, and they became DC4916-DC4951, with 4882 and 4899 not used to keep them in a separate number sub-series.

== Liveries ==
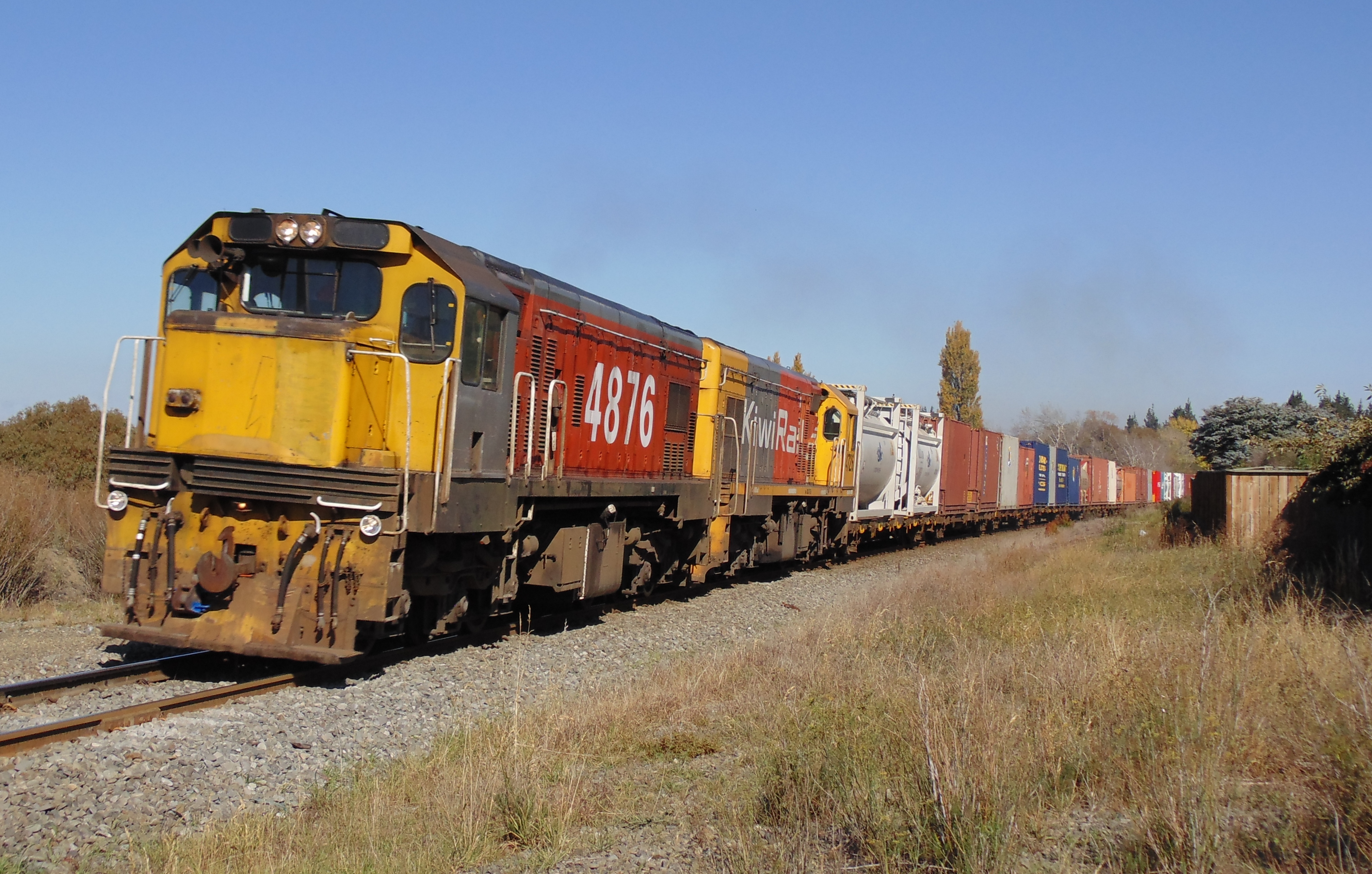
DCs 4876 and 4726 approaching Waipara with a freight train in April 2016.

The class were delivered in the International Orange or "Fruit Salad" livery – orange/red, grey, and yellow with large white numbers on the long hood – which was the standard livery for New Zealand Railways until the early 1990s. The class has since collectively worn almost every other single livery introduced since then, although some examples still wear the original Fruit Salad livery in service today. Liveries worn by the class are:

- International Orange (Fruit Salad) - The livery as introduced. DC4409 is notable as having received a large touch-up of its paint job in this scheme in 2012.
- Flying Tomato - A variation of Fruit Salad, where orange was substituted for the grey. Some locomotives that received this paint scheme were later painted back in Fruit Salad. No DCs still wear this livery.
- New Zealand Rail Blue - The DC class were the first to debut this livery in 1991, the first locomotive in this livery was DC4922, with the orange replaced by a mid-blue and either "NZ Railways" or "New Zealand Rail" on the long hood with numbers painted white on the cab sides. Later in the Tranz Rail era, some locomotives received Cato Blue sticker patches over the long hood lettering with the Tranz Rail logo attached.
- Cato Blue - A variation of New Zealand Rail Blue upon the launch of "Tranz Rail" in late 1995, where a sky-blue colour (Cato Blue) replaced the mid-blue and the Tranz Rail "winged" logo was placed on the long hood. Later, the rights to Cato Blue were sold to Tranz Scenic 2001, and a number of their DCPs received repaints in the livery, but with the Tranz Scenic logo in place of the Tranz Rail logo.
- Bumble Bee - DC4323 was the first locomotive to wear this livery, which consisted of the long hood being black, with the hood end, short hood and cab painted yellow. The first two DCs wore the Tranz Rail winged logo on the long hood. Later locomotives instead had block "T.R." letters in yellow on the long hood.
- MAXX Blue - A variation of Bumble Bee with dark blue on the long hood (with MAXX logo displayed), although with black long hood top and without the extended yellow rear area on the long hood. DC4444 had a variation where large numerals similar to the Fruit Salad livery were displayed on the long hood in place of the MAXX logo, and nothing on the cab sides. The livery was for locomotives leased to ARTA to operate suburban services in Auckland.
- Toll Rail Green (Corncob) - A variation of Bumble Bee where Toll Rail Green was substituted for the black, a lemon yellow replaced the former yellow colour used and the Toll Rail Logo displayed on the long hood in addition to Toll Rail logos on each end of the loco with three green whisker stripes. Later, after Toll Rail sold its stake in the railways in 2008, KiwiRail patch stickers were placed over the Toll Rail logos.
- KiwiRail Phase 1 (KiwiFruit) - The first introduced KiwiRail livery, with DC4260 being the only example to receive it.
- KiwiRail Phase 2 (KiwiRail Bold) - The revised livery, which is now the most common livery on the class.

In addition, DC4093 wore a special one-off "Kiwi Lager" livery to go with the Kiwi Lager Ski Express passenger train, and DC4346 was one of two locomotives to wear a brown with yellow ends "Tasman Forestry" livery.

== DCP subclass ==
The DCP sub-class was established in 2002 to differentiate locomotives owned by Tranz Scenic 2001 Ltd, which was the long-distance passenger business split from Tranz Rail as part of a restructuring. The classification was to distinguish between DC class locomotives owned by Tranz Scenic and from those owned by Tranz Rail Ltd. The DCP classification was retained on these locomotives after the purchase of Tranz Scenic by Toll NZ in 2004 and continues to be used by KiwiRail. Further locomotives since received the classification, though it then referred to those DC locomotives that were fitted with bogie retention wire ropes to stop the bogies falling off in derailments, rather than locomotives dedicated to passenger workings. The practice of reclassifying has now been abandoned by KiwiRail, though most DCs, including all those previously used on Auckland commuter services, have received the bogie ropes.

== Upgrades ==
=== DC Micro ===
In May 1988, trials were carried out using GE's BrightStar control system on DC4588 and DC4939, which were unsuccessful. In November 1988, DC4588 was fitted with the ZTR Control Systems wheel-slip system from Canada. The system substantially enhanced traction on the bogies, maximising traction potential. DC4628 followed in December 1988 and was also a success. Over the next 10 years, 64 DC class locomotives had ZTR fitted.

=== Locolog and Tranzlog ===
Locolog was an event recorder system similar to a black box on aircraft. It was trialled successfully in 1986 on DC4070 and DC4778 before being fitted to all other mainline locomotives. It has since been supplanted by the locally produced Tranzlog system, with both systems having provided significant material to assist in accident investigations.

=== Fire suppression ===
In 2014, six of the class were fitted with fire suppression to run passenger services through the 8.8-kilometre (5.5 mi) Rimutaka Tunnel on the Wairarapa Line due to a change in requirements resulting from the Commission of Inquiry in the Pike River Mine disaster. This was removed from these locomotives in mid-2015 and reinstalled into the DFB class locomotives which took over the haulage of these services. However, fire suppression has been refitted to several members of the class in order to provide locomotives for passenger charter services and for back-up for The Great Journeys of New Zealand long-distance passenger services.

== Disposal ==
=== Withdrawals ===
As of January 2026, 67 locomotives had been withdrawn from service. Locomotives were withdrawn as a result of accidents, or on account of being surplus to requirements or poor mechanical condition. DC4496 was taken out of storage for an experimental rebuild that was later cancelled, and the underframe was scrapped. DC4588, then owned by TasRail, was scrapped in 2011. Three of the withdrawn diesel locomotives were in storage, seven were preserved, and nine had been sold overseas. The remainder had been scrapped.

=== Future ===
In February 2015, KiwiRail issued a Request for Quotation (RFQ) via the Government Electronic Tendering Service for the disposal of 12 of DC class locomotives, with further tranches of locomotives being released from the fleet over the next two years. In mid-2015, KiwiRail confirmed the 12 DCs were purchased by Progress Rail for their 645 V-12 prime movers, and other usable parts to be salvaged and the hulks scrapped. It was also confirmed the 12 locomotives sold were 4029, 4070, 4133, 4225, 4231, 4352, 4398, 4507, 4542, 4640, 4732, and 4784. All locomotives have been scrapped as of December 2018.

In August 2017, KiwiRail announced it was in discussions with global suppliers including General Electric, Electro-Motive Diesel, Alstom, CRRC and Stadler Rail to construct replacements for the remainder of the class. It is expected the first of the replacements to arrive in 2020/21.

In September 2018, it was announced ten DCs were to be withdrawn following the commissioning of the 15 new DL class, with 15 locomotives to remain in service until 2021/22. In November 2018, KiwiRail issued a second RFQ for the disposal of four more DCs, being 4093, 4248, 4369 and 4818. 4093 was scrapped in January 2019, while the other three were purchased for preservation.

=== Preservation ===
As of December 2024, seven class members had been preserved:

- DC4248 and DC4369 were purchased by Mainline Steam (MLS) in 2018 for use on mainline excursions. They arrived at MLS's Plimmerton depot on 9 February 2019, where they both await restoration for mainline certification.
- DC4421 was purchased by a private owner and is currently stored at Mission Bush near Auckland.
- DC4536 was acquired by Glenbrook Vintage Railway, being funded by one of its members in 2021 also for use on mainline excursions.
- DC4818 was purchased by Glenbrook Vintage Railway in 2018 also for use on mainline excursions. It has been designated as GVR No.14. Restoration commenced in September 2019 to mainline standards and after completion was being certified on the KiwiRail network in October 2024.
- DC4876 was acquired by the National Railway Museum of New Zealand in 2019. It was stored at Hillside Workshops, and was transferred to Ferrymead Railway on 31 August 2022.
- DC4375 was acquired by Steam Incorporated in 2021 and towed to its Paekākāriki base on 1 April 2021 and is being restored for use in its heritage EMD fleet. Restored in New Zealand Rail Blue livery, but with Steam Incorporated replacing the New Zealand Railways wording.

== In popular culture ==
- In the 1981 film Goodbye Pork Pie, D^{C} 1582 (later DC4346) hauls a down (westbound) Midland Line freight train including the box wagon in which Gerry, John, and the yellow Mini were hiding.
- In the penultimate scene of the 1982 film Smash Palace, DC4202 hauls an up (northbound) North Island Main Trunk freight train, which appears to be about to crash into a Ford Model T containing Al Shaw and policeman Ray Foley, but at the last second the train enters the crossing loop, missing them. This locomotive was later involved in an accident which led to it being written off.
- DC4790 made two appearances in Yogi Bear: The Movie.
