= Log cradle container =

A log cradle container is a specialized, 20-foot (6.10 m) open top and open-ended, intermodal container designed for carrying (or cradling) logs. This configuration allows it to be loaded from the open top by means of a loader and the logs can protrude from the ends. Like a regular 20-foot container it has eight twistlocks. From where the container is loaded with logs it can be put onto a truck and then on a flat wagon after a short road trip. At the end of the train journey it may be put on a truck to continue to a further destination. The use of the container saves unloading the truck, loading the flat wagon, unloading the flat wagon and loading a truck. In other words it can be handled like any other intermodal container.

This container was designed jointly by KiwiRail and Royal Wolf.

== See also ==
- Skeleton car
