= New Zealand British Rail Mark 2 carriage =

Railway coach

British Rail Mark 2
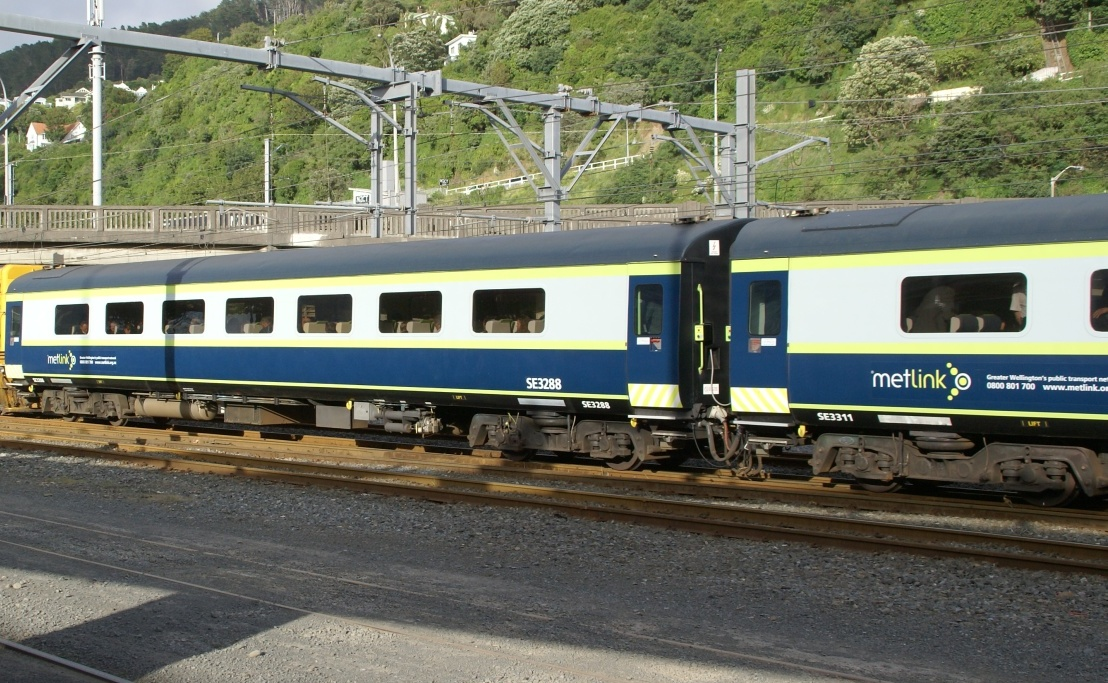
- Refurbished SE class carriages on a Wairarapa Connection service in Wellington

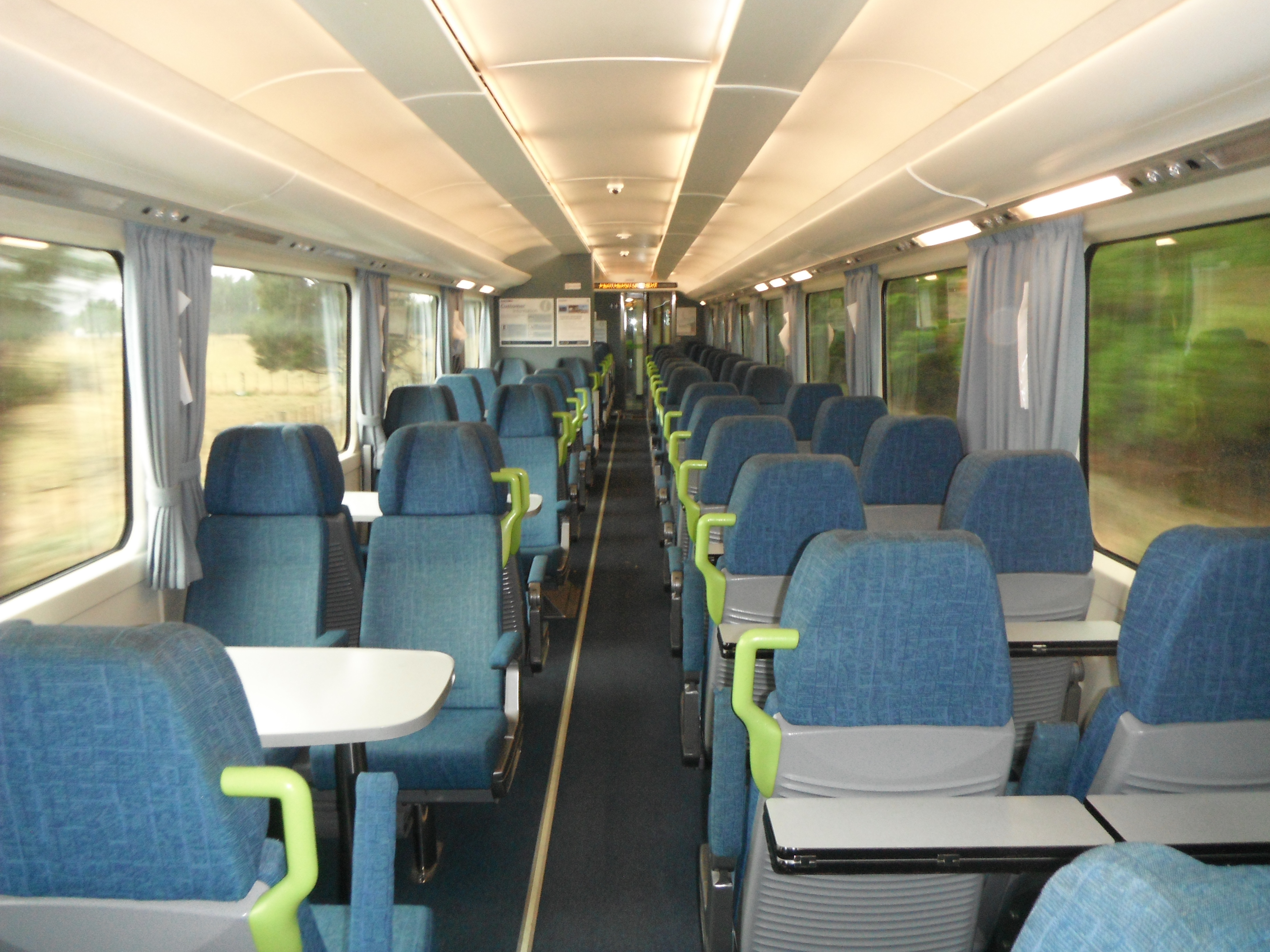
- Interior of Wairarapa Connection carriage SW 5658
- In service: 1971–present (UK); 1998–present (NZ)
- Manufacturer: British Rail Engineering Limited
- Built at: Derby Litchurch Lane Works, England
- Constructed: 1971–1975
- Entered service: 1998
- Refurbished: Hillside Engineering, Dunedin; Hutt Workshops, Lower Hutt
- Number built: 1,876 (UK); 150 (NZ)
- Number preserved: 15
- Number scrapped: 29
- Fleet numbers: BR numbers allocated at time of original build
- Capacity: S servery: 30; S standard: 60; SA: 67; SD: 49; SE: 75; SEG: 44; SES: 63; SW: 64; SWG: 37; SWS: 37
- Operators: KiwiRail (and its predecessors); Great Journeys New Zealand; Transdev Wellington (and its predecessors); Transdev Auckland (defunct)
- Depots: Thorndon (SE, SR, SW)
- Lines served: North Island Main Trunk (Wellington–Palmerston North and Auckland Strand/Papakura–Hamilton); Wairarapa Line (Wellington–Masterton)

Specifications
- Car body construction: Steel
- Car length: 19.66 metres (64 ft 6 in)
- Width: 2.82 metres (9 ft 3 in)
- Height: 3.58–3.65 metres (11 ft 9 in – 12 ft 0 in)
- Floor height: 1.00–1.08 metres (3 ft 3 in – 3 ft 7 in)
- Doors: 4× electrically-operated plug doors (S, SE, SW); 4× electrically operated twin sliding doors (SA, SD)
- Maximum speed: 160 km/h (100 mph) (as built); 100 km/h (62 mph) (S, SE, SW); 90 km/h (56 mph) (SA, SD)
- Weight: S servery: 29.3 tonnes (28.8 long tons; 32.3 short tons); S standard: 28.40 tonnes (27.95 long tons; 31.31 short tons); SA: 31.00 tonnes (30.51 long tons; 34.17 short tons); SD: 35.00 tonnes (34.45 long tons; 38.58 short tons); SE: 33.25 tonnes (32.72 long tons; 36.65 short tons); SEG: 34.25 tonnes (33.71 long tons; 37.75 short tons); SES: 33.25 tonnes (32.72 long tons; 36.65 short tons); SR: 33.25 tonnes (32.72 long tons; 36.65 short tons); SRC: 33.25 tonnes (32.72 long tons; 36.65 short tons); SRV: 33.25 tonnes (32.72 long tons; 36.65 short tons); SW: 33.25 tonnes (32.72 long tons; 36.65 short tons); SWG: 34.25 tonnes (33.71 long tons; 37.75 short tons); SWS: 32.25 tonnes (31.74 long tons; 35.55 short tons)
- Power supply: SD: Perkins / Leroy-Somer – FG Wilson P110E rated at 110KVA; SEG, SWG: diesel alternator rated at 230KVA (type unknown)
- HVAC: Heating and air-conditioning in all classes
- Bogies: x28020plus and S-Ride
- Braking systems: S: 26C; SA, SD, SE, SEG, SES, SW, SWG, SWS: 26C with graduated release function
- Track gauge: 1,067 mm (3 ft 6 in) (originally 1,435 mm (4 ft 8 1/2 in) standard gauge)

The New Zealand British Rail Mark 2 carriages were built by British Rail Engineering Limited for British Rail in the early 1970s. From the mid-1990s, 150 were exported to New Zealand. After being rebuilt, refurbished and re-gauged, they entered service with a variety of operators on New Zealand's railway network. The carriages generally replaced older NZR 56-foot carriages, some of which had been in use for almost 70 years.

== History ==
=== In Britain ===
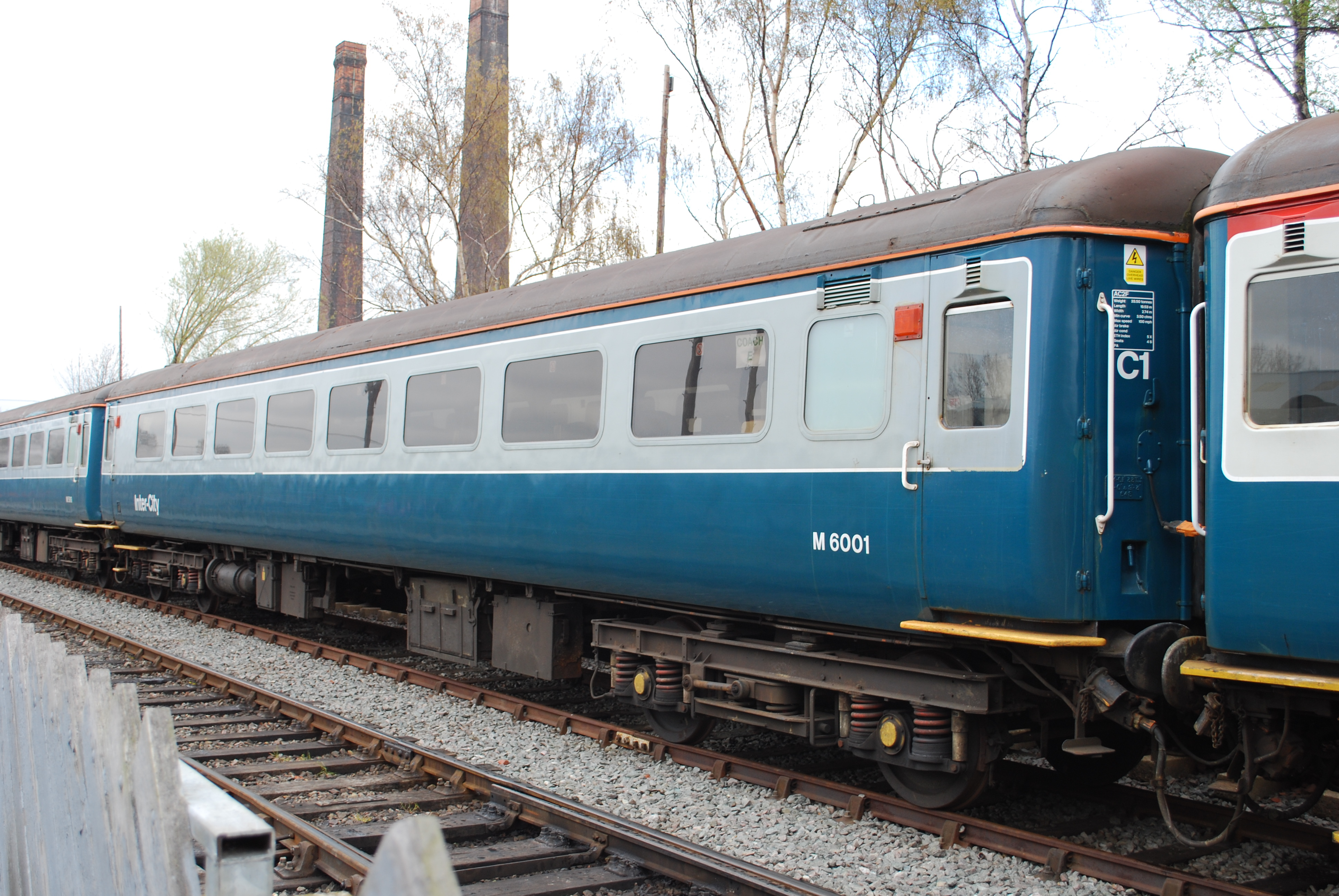
Mark 2 TSO M6001 in April 2012 in original British Rail livery

The British Rail Mark 2 was the second design of carriage by British Rail (BR). The first was built in 1963.

Between 1964 and 1975, 1,876 Mark 2 carriages were constructed at Derby Litchurch Lane Works. There were seven sub-classes, 2 & 2A to 2F. The Mark 2D to 2F classes, built from 1971 onwards, had air conditioning and could be distinguished from earlier sub-classes by having sheet glass windows. All of the carriages imported into New Zealand were from these latter three sub-classes. When introduced they were used on all mainline services in Great Britain. They were superseded by British Rail Mark 3 carriages.

=== In New Zealand ===
Because of construction constraints, most railway lines in New Zealand have a limited loading gauge. Great Britain uses 1,435 mm (4 ft 8 1/2 in) standard gauge, but its loading gauge is only slightly larger than New Zealand's 3 ft 6 in (1,067 mm) Cape gauge. This means that British Rail rolling stock like the Mark 2 carriage can run on most New Zealand lines after gauge conversion. To fit the New Zealand loading gauge, the Mark 2s were lowered on their new bogies by 25 centimetres (9.8 in).

New Zealand rail operator Tranz Rail and heritage operator Mainline Steam Heritage Trust bought 69 Mark 2 carriages (one damaged by fire after arrival) in 1996. Eight were extensively refurbished for the Wellington–Palmerston North Capital Connection, classified S (for Scenic), with new Japanese bogies and new auto plug doors and interiors. The refurbishment proved more costly than expected, and the remaining carriages were laid up until a rebuilding programme began for the Auckland Regional Transport Authority for Auckland suburban trains. Classified SA/SD, these have two sets of sliding doors each side and are operated by Transdev Auckland for Auckland Transport in push-pull mode, with DC (four-car sets) or DFT (six-car sets) locomotives leased from KiwiRail. The SD carriages include a driver's cab and operate in a similar manner to DBSOs in the UK.

In the southern autumn of 2006, Mark 2E and 2F carriages formerly operated by One were imported into New Zealand. They were bought by Greater Wellington Regional Council for operation by Tranz Metro on the Metlink Wairarapa Connection between Wellington and Masterton and were rebuilt at Hillside Workshops in Dunedin, classified SW, SWG and SWS.

Six more were bought by Greater Wellington Regional Council for trains between Wellington, Upper Hutt and Plimmerton, top-and-tailed by EO electric locomotives. These were refurbished by Hillside Workshops and classified SE, SEG and SES.

In late 2009, all S, SE and SW carriages were required to be modified so that their pneumatically operated interior doors open automatically if the compressed air supply is lost. This was identified as an issue after the locomotive on a Wairarapa Connection train derailed when it hit a landslide on 23 July 2009, resulting in the locomotive having to be shut down and cutting the compressed air supply to the SW carriages in the process. The doors stuck in position, and three people were required to open them manually, sparking safety concerns that the carriages could not be evacuated quickly in the event of a fire.

== In service ==
=== Capital Connection ===
The eight S (Scenic) carriages operated on KiwiRail's Capital Connection service between Wellington and Palmerston North, each seating 60 (except the servery car, S 3200, which seats 31) in both alcove and airline-style arrangements. These were the first British Railways Mark 2 carriage rebuilds, and they retain the original window configuration and curved Corten-steel vestibule ends. Seven cars, accompanied by refurbished baggage and generator carriage AG130, entered service on Monday 1 November 1999. An eighth car was added in 1999.

Originally painted in the Tranz Rail Cato Blue livery with grey roofs and black underfloor equipment. For the latter part of their service, the Capital Connection livery was light and dark blue. The S-class carriages were retired on 30 July 2023 but were kept in reserve and used on a number of occasions. They were then offered for sale. The carriages were then sold to the Pounamu Tourism Group, and transferred to Mainland Rail (see below).

Since 2023, the SR (Scenic Regional) class carriages have operated on the Capital Connection service, painted in the Capital Connection livery of light and dark blue. The SR class are former Auckland Transport SA and SD class carriages used on the Auckland suburban network, retired in 2014-2015. They were relocated from storage in Taumarunui and were refurbished to a similar design of the new Te Huia Hamilton to Auckland train under the Upgrade New Zealand Programme. Classified SRG (Generator carriage), SRC (Café carriage) and SR (Regional carriage). The first set of seven refurbished SR carriages entered service on 31 July 2023.

=== Wellington suburban ===
The SW (Suburban Wairarapa) type is owned by the Greater Wellington Regional Council, leased to Transdev Wellington to operate on Metlink's Wairarapa Connection between Wellington and Masterton.

There are 12 SW, three SWS and three SWG carriages in three sets, of three to eight cars depending on the service, with the consist made up of an SWG, an SW, an SWS, and then the remaining SW cars. Some trains have luggage/generator van AG 222 to supplement or replace the SWG.

SW carriages have 64 seats in both alcove and airline-style arrangements with a single toilet at the north end (next to the A2 door), automatic doors and a public address system. SWS carriages have 37 seats (31 plus six that can be folded away to fit up to four wheelchairs), with a space for a servery (not used), a wheelchair hoist on each side, an audio induction loop system, and an accessible toilet. SWG carriages have 37 seats, a luggage compartment and a diesel generator to power the carriages.

They are in Metlink livery.

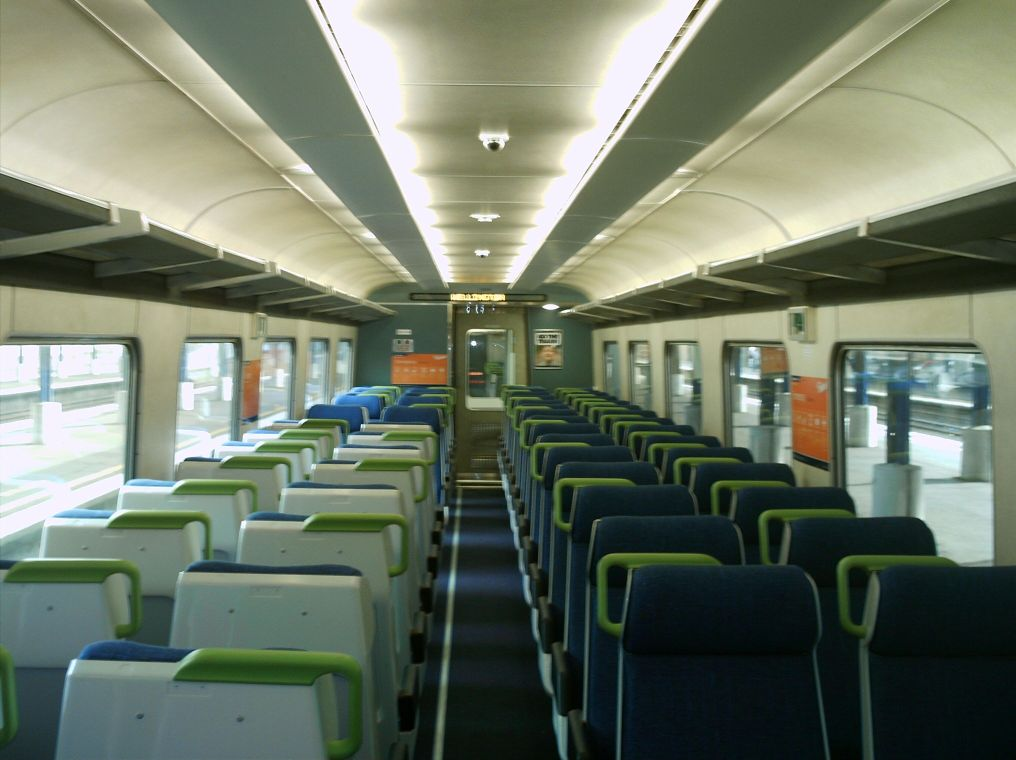
The interior of an SE carriage, formerly used on Metlink peak services in Wellington

The SE (Suburban Express) type is similar to the SW, owned by the Greater Wellington Regional Council. They were brought into service as part of a number of temporary measures to increase capacity until arrival of the FP/FT class "Matangi" units in 2010–2012, with the intent that they may be eventually transferred to the Wairarapa Connection service. They were operated as a single consist by Tranz Metro on peak express services top-and-tailed by EO class electric locomotives.

There are four SE, one SES and one SEG carriages, which received a less thorough rebuild than the SWs and retain their BR airline-style seating. The SES is accessible like SWS carriages but lacks the servery. In November 2011, they were taken out of service due to frequent faults of the run-down electric locomotives pulling them and the availability of sufficient Matangi units to replace them.

In December 2012, it was announced that they would be reintroduced on the Wairarapa Connection to alleviate capacity issue and rolling stock constraints. After minor modifications, the SE carriages would be introduced on the Wairarapa line in July 2013. They were criticised by train users for their smaller seat pitch, poor lighting, and lack of tray tables and power outlets. This led Greater Wellington to make additional modifications to the carriages over Christmas 2013 by installing a number of tables and removing a row of seating to increase space between the seats.

They are in the Metlink livery of dark blue and grey, with lime green highlights.

=== Mainland Rail ===
The original Capital Connection S class carriages, retired in 2023, were sold to the Pounamu Tourism Group, a company offering rail tours. The carriages were relocated to Hillside Engineering in Dunedin for refurbishment. Ownership of the carriages was subsequently transferred to Mainland Rail, which is one-third owned by Pounamu Tourism. Mainland Rail has stated they intend to use the carriages for long-distance services:

- The Whale Train: Christchurch - Kaikoura.
- The Mountaineer: Lyttelton, Christchurch - Arthurs Pass
- The Mainlander: Christchurch - Dunedin - Invercargill

=== KiwiRail rebuilds ===
During early 2018, six former Auckland SA carriages were relocated by KiwiRail from Taumarunui to the Hutt Workshops in Wellington, three of which are for overhaul as additional luggage vans to be classified AKS for KiwiRail including the Northern Explorer, Coastal Pacific and TranzAlpine. A further twelve of the carriages have been refurbished into the SR class for KiwiRail on the Auckland-Hamilton service, Te Huia. There are two trains running the route with four carriages and a 147-passenger capacity, a spare rake of carriages for spares.

From March 2018, three SA carriages were overhauled and converted into luggage vans for KiwiRail division Great Journeys New Zealand. into the AKS luggage vans at the Hutt Workshops. The first of the new AKS luggage vans was photographed in the Great Journeys of New Zealand livery on the Hutt Workshops traverser,. During 2022 three former Auckland SA carriages were overhauled and reconfigured into Kitchen carriages, one each for the Northern Explorer, Coastal Pacific and TranzAlpine and classified AKF.

=== Te Huia ===
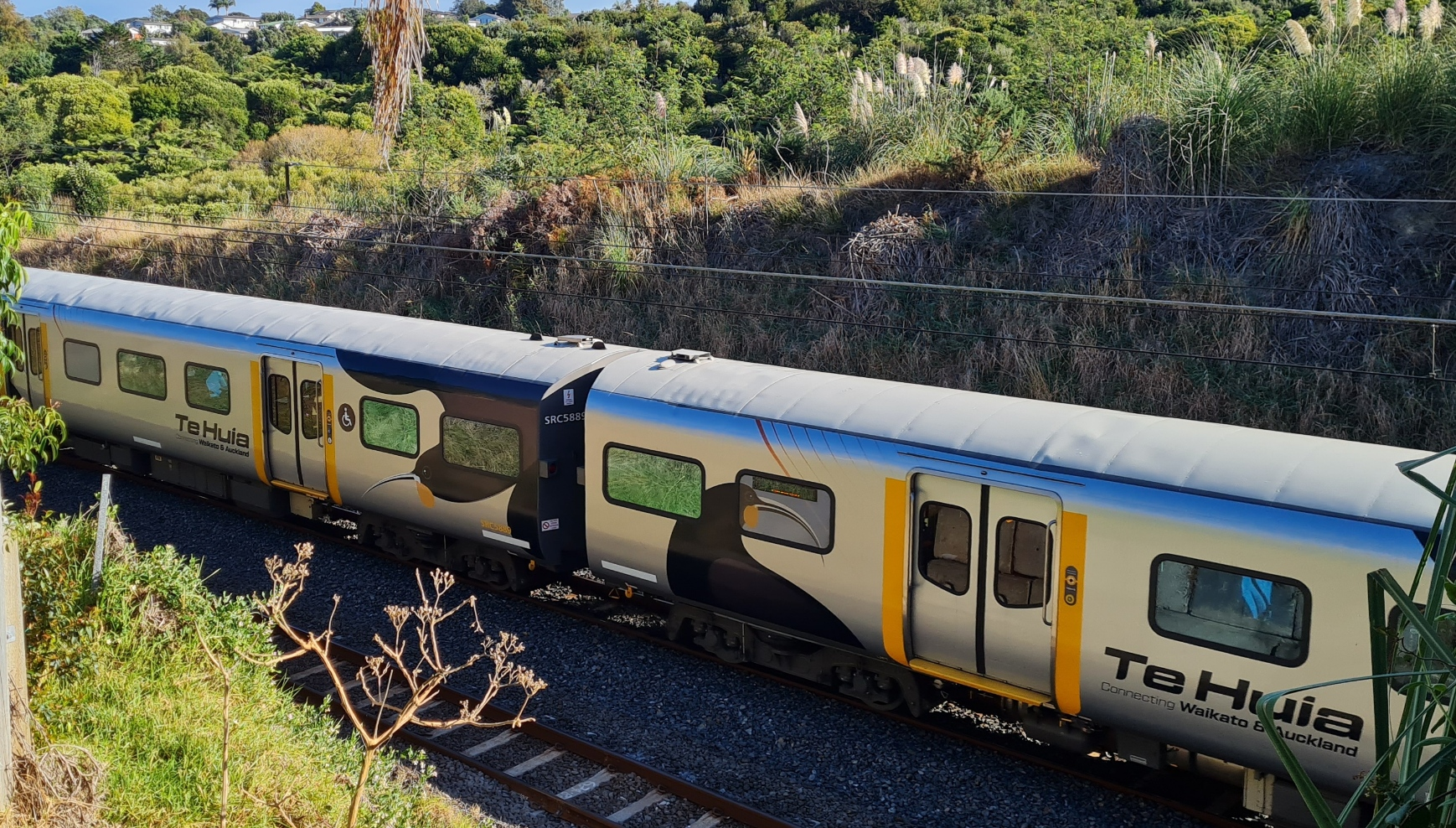
Two southbound SR class carriages on Te Huia at Meadowbank, NIMT

The 145-minute Te Huia passenger service from Hamilton to Auckland's Strand Station via Papakura Station and Puhinui Station, Auckland commenced on Tuesday 6 April 2021 as an 80-minute journey to Papakura, having been delayed from 2020 by the COVID-19 pandemic, late delivery of bogies, and an urgent and unexpected track replacement program in Auckland. In 2022, the journey was extended to Auckland's Strand Station to address deficiencies in the original service including the slow connecting time on all stops commuter services to central Auckland and connecting the Te Huia service to Puhinui Station, a short bus journey from Auckland Airport.

The disposition of the eleven overhauled SR (Scenic Regional) carriages are 5x SR, 3x SRC and 3x SRV, plus two un-overhauled Auckland SA carriages held in reserve; namely carriages SR 5847, SR 6061, SRC 5889 and SRV5893.

There are two trains made up of four carriages each, having the capacity for 150 passengers. Trains set off at Frankton, stopping at the new Rotokauri Transport Hub and Huntly station, before reaching Papakura. They will be operated by KiwiRail on behalf of the Waikato Regional Council The three refurbished SDs and seven SAs have been overhauled by KiwiRail in the Hutt Railway Workshops. They are hauled by DFT locomotives.

SR (Suburban Regional) are former Auckland SA carriages.

SRC (Suburban Regional Catering) are former Auckland SA carriages, now with a cafe, servery and wheelchair hoist and wheelchair help points.

SRV (Suburban Regional Vehicle) driving carriages with generator sets, which are former Auckland SD driving carriages.

=== Great Journeys of New Zealand ===
AKS class luggage van: three former Auckland SA carriages were overhauled and reconfigured in 2018 as additional luggage vans to be classified for the Northern Explorer, Coastal Pacific and TranzAlpine. fitted with a crew compartment, improved catering provision storage, recycling storage facilities, luggage and cycle racks. AKS 5828 and 5926 were trialled in late 2019 and early 2020. AKS 5658 was delayed waiting for new bogies. All three are now in service on the Northern Explorer, Coastal Pacific and TranzAlpine.

AKF class kitchen car: three former Auckland SA carriages were overhauled and reconfigured into kitchen cars in 2022, one each for the Northern Explorer, Coastal Pacific and TranzAlpine. The first, AKF6112, was marshalled around Woburn and the Hutt Workshops in late October 2022. The carriage had been reskinned removing windows and one set of metro styled doors at one end, painted in Great Journeys New Zealand colour scheme, but retained its former designation as SA 6112 while finishing work was undertaken.

=== Glenbrook Vintage Railway ===
The Railway Enthusiast's Society GVR acquired SA, SD and SX carriages from Auckland Transport in 2021 on behalf of GVR for their future needs after the sale of these carriages to other parties had fallen through. Upon inspection, the SX carriages were surplus to GVRs needs and sold via Trade Me.

The disposition of these carriages are 9x SA and 4x SD carriages purchased by RES SA5638, SA5770, SA5703, SA5818, SA5743, SA5829, SA5617, SA5695, SA5730, SD3199, SD5652, SD5762, SD5842

The four GVR SDs, SD3199, SD5652, SD5762 and SD5842, were railed north to Glenbrook by GVRs own DBR1254 on 9 July 2024.. The balance of nine SAs SA5638, SA5770, SA5703, SA5818, SA5743, SA5829, SA5617, SA5695 and SA5730 were railed north by Glenbrook Vintage Railway's DBR1254, along with two SDs for Steam Incorporated for storage at Mission Bush 27 August 2024.

Driving carriage SD5842 which is fitted with a generator for powering carriages was parked in the Glenbrook Station Yard during the Christmas lights 2024 event both on static display and generating power for lighting the event.

=== Mainline Steam Heritage Trust ===
In August 1996, Mainline Steam Heritage Trust (MLST) principal Ian Welch bought 15 former Anglia Railways Mark 2 coaches with the intention of rebuilding them for MLST excursions. Seven cars were unloaded at the Port of Lyttelton for MLST's Christchurch depot at Middleton, the other eight at the Port of Auckland for MLST Auckland at the former Parnell Diesel Depot.

This move was initiated by concerns that Tranz Rail would no longer be able to offer carriages from its charter fleet, made up of the 56-foot carriages. Rather than fitting them with x-28020 high-speed bogies from scrapped FM guards' vans, they were to be fitted with x-27750 Kinki bogies from scrapped F^{S} steam-heating vans built in the late 1960s. In 1997 Tranz Rail advised that the charter fleet would be available in future and Welch sold them to Tranz Rail, which moved them into storage at Hutt Workshops by the end of that year.

In 2007, the situation had changed with rail operator Toll Rail having moved the Auckland charter fleet carriages south to Wellington to replace more 56-foot carriages, which were being withdrawn so that their x-28020 bogies could be fitted to the SW cars being rebuilt at Hillside Workshops in Dunedin. With very few options available, Welch purchased ex Virgin Trains West Coast Mark 2F FO 3433 and TSOs 5915/5939/6419, arriving later that year at the Port of Auckland. They were trucked to the group's Wellington base, adjacent to Plimmerton railway station.

In 2008, Welch purchased four ex Virgin and five ex-Gatwick Express coaches from Angel Trains and Porterbrook, arriving at the port of Auckland in 2008 and trucked to Hutt Workshops for storage. This brought the total to 13 coaches, nine of which were in storage at Hutt.

The Virgin cars – Mark 2E FO 3299/3393, Mark 2F TSO 5914/5988 – were stored until MLST had space at Plimmerton, which was becoming increasingly pressured for secure storage space.

The Gatwick Mark 2F cars were:

- Class 488/2 set 488209: TFOH 72508 (ex FO 3409), TSOH 72644 (ex TSO 6039)
- Class 488/3 set 488313: TSOLH 72624 (ex TSO 5972), TSOLH 72625 (ex TSO 6085), TSOL 72172 (ex TSO 6091).

In 2009, rebuilding began with TSO 5939 as the template, 5915, 6149, 3433, 5914 and 3299 following in order.

In 2011 FO 3299/3409 and TSO 5914/5988 were trucked to Plimmerton for eventual rebuilding.

The work involves the following:

- Removing the battery boxes and generator and replacement with connectors for head-end power, to be supplied from a 240kVa generator in rebuilt luggage/viewing van FM 3010
- Replacement of brake components with a mixture of new and refurbished equipment
- Fitting a retention toilet at one end (the cars had the straight-discharge toilets, which are no longer acceptable)
- Refurbished interiors including a public address system and renewed electrical wiring
- Fitting x-27750 Kinki bogies ex-F^{S} steam-heat vans, of monocoque construction. Originally they were used without being altered, but they have now been rebuilt with new bogie bolsters welded in to replace the original castings. Other cars may be fitted with x-28020 bogies ex-F^{M} guards' vans, similar to many of the S/SA/SD/SW cars.

They are painted Midnight Blue with a Pearl Grey roof (easier to clean than a white roof, as they will be steam-hauled) and a white window band. Four have been named after railway landmarks, famous sections of the line, and railway companies.

Like the S class, they retain their original external appearance with curved Corten-steel ends (the SA/SD/SW/SE cars have flat ends). Five cars are still in open storage at Plimmerton.

Mark 2E FO 3393, and Mark 2F TSO 5972/6039/6085/6091 are stored at Feilding in Manawatu. Originally intended for overhaul, the five carriage bodies were advertised as surplus and for sale on TradeMe in 2020. They became surplus after further complete AO carriages were purchased from KiwiRail that had been stored in Middlemarch. It is unclear if they sold.

SD 5761, one of Ian Welch's original 15 Mark 2s from 1997, was purchased by Mainline Steam and arrived on 22 August 2018 at Plimmerton from storage in Taumarunui for conversion into an observation carriage for its Mark 2 rake of carriages.

== Former services ==
=== Auckland suburban ===
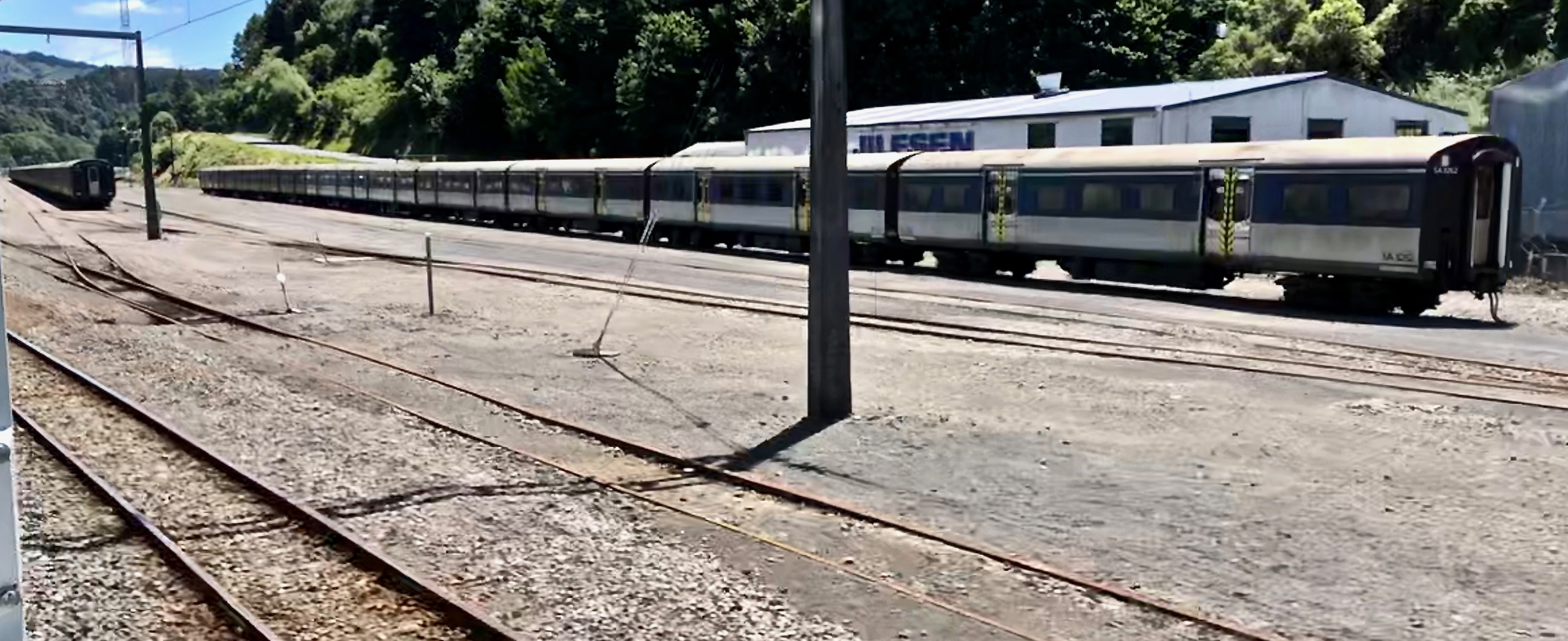
Over 30 SA and SD coaches remained at Taumarunui at the end of 2019.

SA (Suburban Auckland) Auckland Transport carriages were operated by Transdev Auckland in sets of three to five cars, with an SD car (see below) and a DC (four- and five-car total) or DFT/DFB class (six-car total) diesel-electric locomotive in push-pull configuration.

They had electronic double doors and have two types of bogie: some re-used from 56-foot carriages and new bogies with air-cushion secondary suspension, nicknamed S-Ride bogies. They were in the MAXX livery of blue and grey.

The original push-pull train concept was initiated by Tranz Rail, and construction of the push-pull sets began in 2003 at Dunedin's the Hillside Workshops. 104 carriages were converted. The 24 SD (Suburban Driving) Auckland Transport carriages have a driving cab to allow push-pull SA/SD trains, similar to British Rail Mark 2 Driving Brake Standard Open (DBSO) carriages, and diesel generators to power the carriages.

Besides the two different bogie types (x28020 and S-Ride), the SD fleet does not vary by much. SD5624 and SD5762, both being x28020 type vehicles, are fitted with park brake controls as their sets contain S-Ride type cars fitted with park brakes. Both of those SDs retain a conventional ratchet type handbrake. SD 5794 was fitted for several years with European Train Control System (ETCS) equipment, to test the system prior to full-scale introduction on board the AM class EMU. As at August 2014, this ETCS equipment has been removed, and the cab instruments reverted to the standard layout, and ETP installed. All SDs are now fitted with Electronic Train Protection (ETP) equipment.

Diesel-hauled services were phased out starting in 2014 and entirely September 2015 replaced by AM class EMUs, then placed into storage in Taumarunui and sold into other uses. The 104 surplus SA/SD carriages were relocated to Taumarunui where unsuccessful attempts to sell them overseas fell through.

As of 7 June 2024, the disposition of on-sold SA/SDs from Auckland Transport are:

- KiwiRail - 47 carriages (not including 28 SA scrapped)
- Railway Enthusiasts Society - 13 SA/SD carriages (9xSA and 4xSD) previously located in Taumarunui were relocated to Mission Bush by GVR/RES into storage for their future needs August 2024.
- Antipodean Explorer – 0 cars (See below)
- Octagonal Capital – 0 cars (Sales from AT and Antipodean Explorer fell through)
- Steam Incorporated – 2 SDs (SD5675 and SD5883) parted out for bogies, generators and electronics by Steam Inc at GVR.
- Mainline Steam Heritage Trust – 4 SDs (3 bodies onsold per below)
- Taumarunui Rail Action Centre - SA3224. On display.

Twelve former Auckland Transport SA class carriages purchased by KiwiRail with wide metro style doors previously stored in Taumarunui are currently in 2021 being refurbished for the Capital Connection to a similar design of the new Te Huia Hamilton to Auckland train under the Upgrade New Zealand Programme and will enter service in 2022 and will replace the current S class carriages.

As of March 2021, there were 28 SA/SDs and 6 SX carriages remaining, which are currently stored at the KiwiRail Taumaranui railway yard. Auckland Transport's financial team confirmed that if AT were to write off the carriages, AT would be able to offer them to KiwiRail, Octagonal and the Glenbrook Vintage Railway. The three parties have confirmed that they are willing to buy each carriage for a dollar. The write off and offer to sell for a dollar each is to offset the ongoing costs that were being incurred by AT annually to store the 34 carriages. KiwiRail indicated the carriages would likely be used to provide extra carriages for the Te Huia and Capital Connection rail services, while Octagonal and the Glenbrook Vintage Railway indicated they would utilise them for tourism projects at some point in the future.

The distribution of the carriages except for those purchased by RES is unknown. 9x SA and 4x SD carriages purchased by RES as follows: SA5638, SA5770, SA5703, SA5818, SA5743, SA5829, SA5617, SA5695, SA5730, SD3199, SD5652, SD5762, SD5842 The four GVR SDs, SD3199, SD5652, SD5762 and SD5842, were railed north to Glenbrook on 9 July 2024.. The balance of nine SAs SA5638, SA5770, SA5703, SA5818, SA5743, SA5829, SA5617, SA5695 and SA5730 were railed north by Glenbrook Vintage Railway's DBR1254, along with two SDs for Steam Incorporated for storage at Mission Bush 27 August 2024.

Three SD bodies were onsold by Mainline Steam for private use, minus bogies and generators, and are located at C&R Developments Ltd – a mining vehicle contractor and builder in Hannon Road, Hautapu, Cambridge in the North Island of New Zealand.

After a campaign by Taumarunui locals and the Ruapehu District Council for the removal of the heavily graffitied carriages, KiwiRail scrapped 27 of the carriages in March 2024 as they were equipped with older, x28020plus coil spring suspension bogies that were "less suitable" for re-use. The 40+ year old bogies had come from former NZR FM guards vans. Twenty-six carriages will remain on site: Eleven belong to KiwiRail, 15 to Glenbrook Vintage Railway, and two for Steam Incorporated and a single SA was purchased for the Taumarunui Rail Action Centre by one its members, preventing its scrapping and it is now on display. The eleven owned by KiwiRail were "more suitable" for spare parts or future conversion projects. KiwiRail intends also to remove these carriages from the site. In May 2025, the Ruapehu District Council and Taumarunui Rail Action Centre have both reported that due to further vandalism, KiwiRail have removed the remaining carriages to the Hutt Workshops for future overhauls.

=== Antipodean Explorer ===
During 2018, 31 SA and SD class formerly used in Auckland sets were purchased by the Antipodean Explorer company and transported from storage in Taumarunui to Dunedin by KiwiRail for refurbishment into a luxury train at the former Hillside Railway Workshops. Initially, 16 carriages arrived in early April 2018, with the balance to follow. Three SD carriages have been purchased for conversion to observation carriages with the SA as sleepers, restaurant, lounge, baggage and crew carriages. Antipodean Explorer has financial backing from Chinese company Fu Wah. The train is planned to be in service in 2020. The project was placed on hold in June 2020. 10 of the 16 SA/SD carriages previously moved to Hillside have been moved covered in white plastic wrap were trucked to Picton, ferried to Wellington and railed to Hutt Workshops throughout late 2021, The balance of were moved to the Hutt Workshops. The balance of the 15 S-ride equipped carriages at Taumarunui that were provisionally sold by Auckland Transport to Antipodean Explorer, were then provisionally on-sold for $1 each to Octagonal Capital Investments and KiwiRail. The Octagonal Capital Investments deal fell through, so all the remaining stock was sold for $1 each to KiwiRail

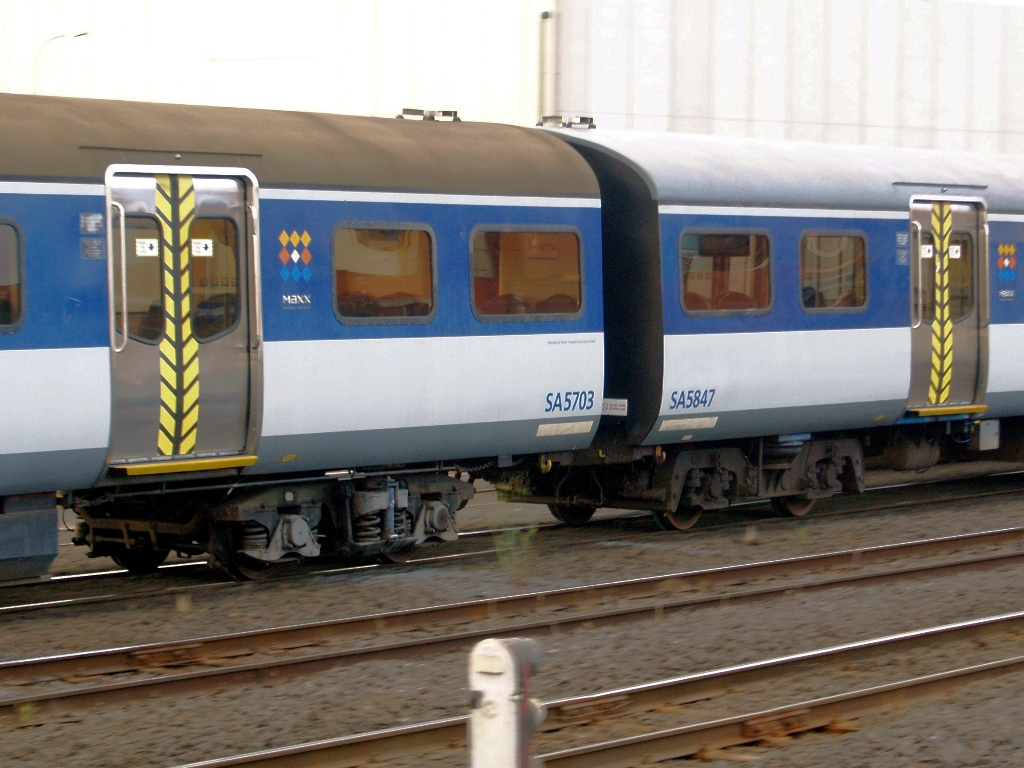
Two SA cars, showing re-used (left) and new (right) bogies on 4 February 2010

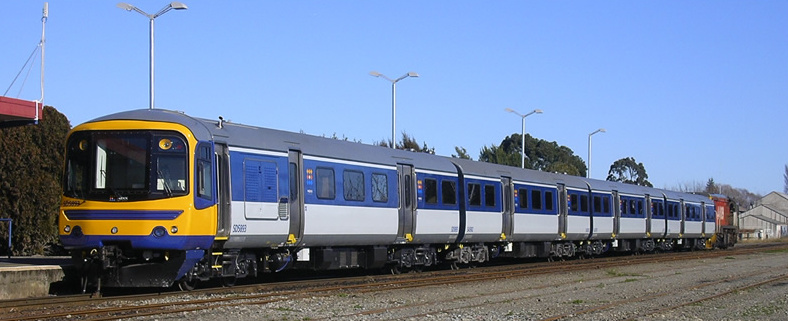
Three SA cars and an SD car with DC 4409 on a test run at Masterton on 26 June 2008

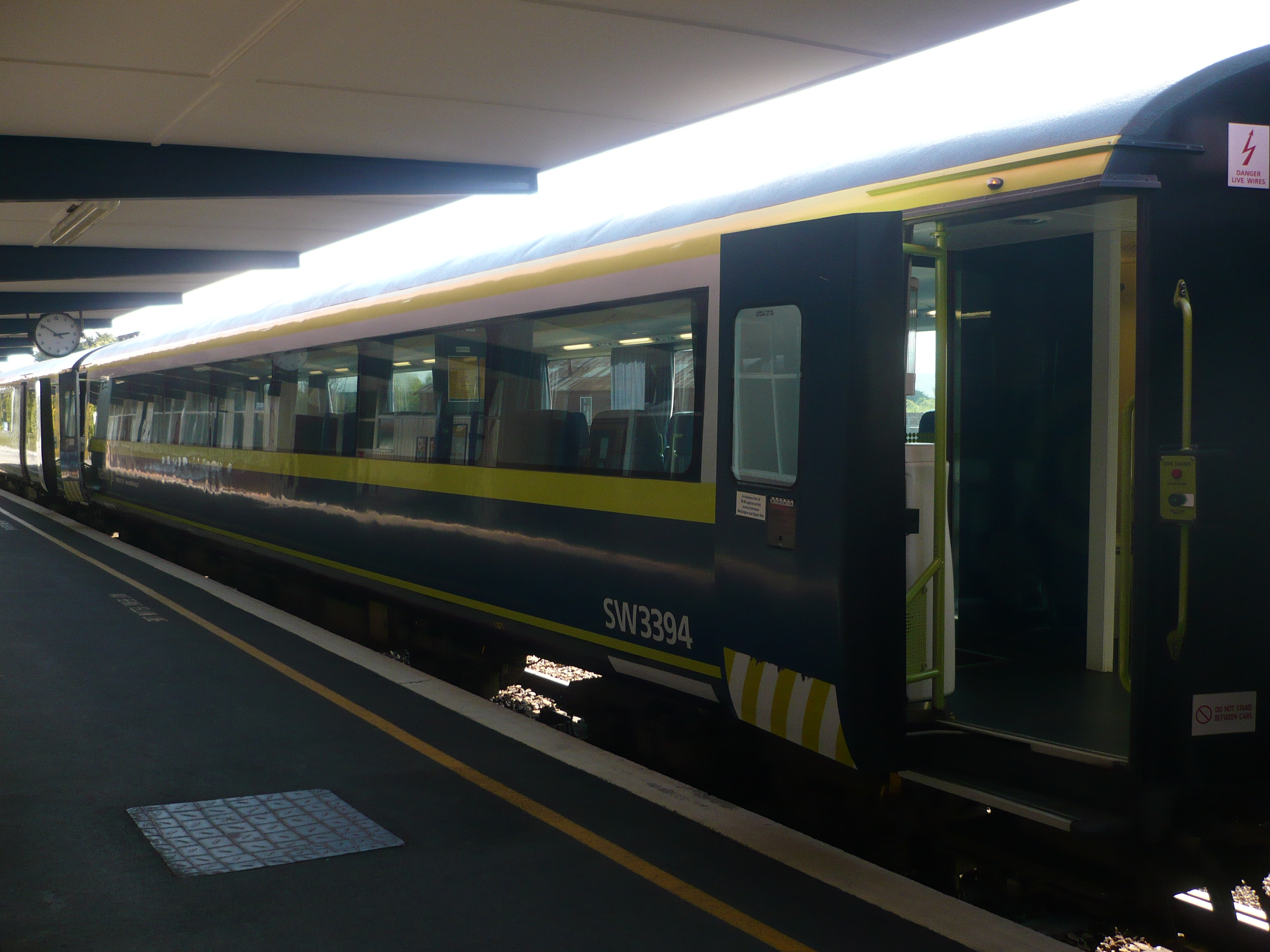
SW 3394 at Masterton on a Wairarapa Connection service on 22 September 2009

== Disposals ==
Three SD bodies initially sold to Mainline Steam Heritage Trust for the bogies have since been repurposed by private owners.

The bodies of S3170 and SA5729 were scrapped at Sims Pacific Metals in Seaview near Wellington in November 2021.

During mid-March 2024 KiwiRail scrapped 27 carriages in Taumarunui as they were equipped with older, x28020plus coil spring suspension bogies that were "less suitable" for re-use.

In September 2024, SD5675 and SD5883 were railed to the Glenbrook Vintage Railway and then quickly parted out for bogies, generators and electronics by Steam Incorporated.

=== Preserved ===
Former AT MAXX SA and SD carriages:

- SA3224 Static Displayed in its AT MAXX livery at the Taumarunui Rail Action Centre after being purchased by one its members, preventing its demolition in 2024.
- SA5638, SA5770, SA5703, SA5818, SA5743, SA5829, SA5617, SA5695, SA5730, SD3199, SD5652, SD5762, SD5842 preserved and relocated to Glenbrook Vintage Railway in 2024 for their future needs.
- SD5761 One of Ian Welch's original 15 Mark 2s from 1997, was purchased from Auckland Transport by Mainline Steam Heritage Trust and now located at Plimmerton.
