= Scenic Daylight =

Former rail service between Auckland and Wellington

The Scenic Daylight was a daytime express train in New Zealand, introduced on 17 December 1960 between Auckland and Wellington along the North Island Main Trunk Railway, replacing the Daylight Limited. The service was steam-hauled initially but from 1963 it was diesel-hauled. The service was itself replaced in 1968 by the Blue Streak railcar service.

== Introduction ==
The Daylight Limited operated primarily at the Christmas and Easter peak seasons; only the overnight Night Limited, and Express, ran outside peak travel periods. However, as dieselisation of North Island railway lines progressed swiftly in the 1950s and 1960s, the decision was taken to replace the Daylight Limited with a diesel-hauled service that ran on Monday and Saturday from mid-December to the end of January.

== Operation ==
The Scenic Daylight typically consisted of DA class diesel-electric locomotives and NZR 56-foot carriages that had been built around World War II. As dining cars had been removed from New Zealand's railways as an economy measure during World War I and not re-introduced until the launch of the Southerner in 1971, the train made refreshment stops in Frankton and Taumarunui. It also stopped for refreshments at Paekakariki, Palmerston North, and Taihape. The train also stopped at Marton, Ohakune and Te Kuiti. Due to the power of the DA locomotives, the service operated to a faster timetable than the Daylight Limited, taking 12¾ hours, leaving Auckland at 8.30am and Wellington at 8.45am and arriving at 9.15 and 9.25pm respectively.

== Replacement ==
In 1968 an RM class 88-seater railcar was refurbished and repainted in a distinctive blue scheme that led to it being nicknamed the Blue Streak. It initially operated an unsuccessful service between Hamilton and Auckland in early 1968, and was transferred to the Auckland-Wellington run on 23 September 1968. This service did not actually replace the Scenic Daylight, it was in addition to it. It initially ran from Wellington to Auckland on Mondays, Wednesdays, and Fridays, and returning the next day. The Blue Streak service was in turn replaced by the daily (except Sunday) Silver Fern railcar service from 18 December 1972.
