= Daylight Limited =

Former rail service between Auckland and Wellington

The Daylight Limited was an express passenger train between Auckland and Wellington, New Zealand along the North Island Main Trunk. It commenced in 1925 and was replaced by the Scenic Daylight in 1960.

== Introduction ==
After the introduction of the Night Limited in 1924, the New Zealand Railways Department investigated the possibility of a daylight train between Wellington and Auckland. It was introduced on a trial basis in 1925-26, but was then cancelled until another trial in 1929-30. The economic impact of the Great Depression intervened and the service was cut back to operating solely during the Christmas and Easter peak seasons.

== Operation ==
In the off-peak season the Night Limited catered for passenger demand between Auckland and Wellington, but at the times of the most intense demand extra trains ran. In the early years of the service, A^{B} and sometimes W^{AB} class steam locomotives operated the train, and later more modern locomotives such as the K^{A} class were used, with ED and EW electric locomotives between Wellington and Paekākāriki from 1940.

The train made extended stops at Mercer, Frankton, Taumarunui and Marton for refreshments: Marton refreshment rooms closed in 1954 and Mercer in 1958.

== Replacement ==
In 1963, the train was replaced by the diesel-hauled Scenic Daylight operating year-round.
