= NZR 50-foot carriage =

NZR A class 50-foot carriage
- In service: from 1908
- Manufacturer: New Zealand Railways Department (NZR)
- Built at: Otahuhu, Auckland; Addington, Christchurch
- Constructed: 1908 - 1935
- Line served: various

Specifications
- Car length: 50 feet (15.24 m)
- Track gauge: 3 ft 6 in (1,067 mm)

The NZR 50-foot carriage of 1908 were originally constructed for the North Island Main Trunk (NIMT) passenger trains. The first were clad in kauri, with open end platforms, however those built from 1930 were clad in steel, with enclosed vestibules. These main line cars were used by the NZR.

== Introduction ==
From 1930, similar cars were ordered for South Island services and for North Island provincial services, in particular, for the Rotorua Limited express. All of the North Island cars were 8 ft 11 in (2.72 m) wide and the 20 South Island cars (7 first class seating 30) were 8 ft 5 in (2.57 m) wide. The North Island second class cars seated 42 passengers with four across, but the South Island cars seated 37 passengers with three across. Two observation cars with lounge chairs were trialed on the Rotorua service from 1930, but did not prove successful and were converted into ordinary carriages.

== Further development ==
In 1934 orders for carriages for mainline use in both islands, with the body width at the waist increased. They were 50 ft 0 in (15.24 m) long, and 11 ft 4 in (3.45 m) high. The width was 8 ft 5 1/2 in (2.58 m) at the waist reducing to 8 ft 4 3/4 in (2.56 m) at about window height. The carriages had an enclosed vestibule at each end; and were divided in two by a central lavatory compartment, with a Flush toilet on one side and a "Lav" (handbasin) on the other side. Seating was three per row, with first-class passengers in single reclining chair seats, two seats on one side and one on the other side of the aisle (except that there were double seats at either end of the compartment). In second-class the initial longitudinal seats were replaced by "Addington" chairs and then "Scarrett" seats, a single seat on one side of the aisle and a double seat on the other side. The seating for passengers was:

- First class: 18 passengers and 15 passengers (total 33) in two compartments
- Second class: 21 passengers and 18 passengers (total 39) in two compartments.
- Composite: 13 first class and 21 second class passengers (total 34) in two compartments.

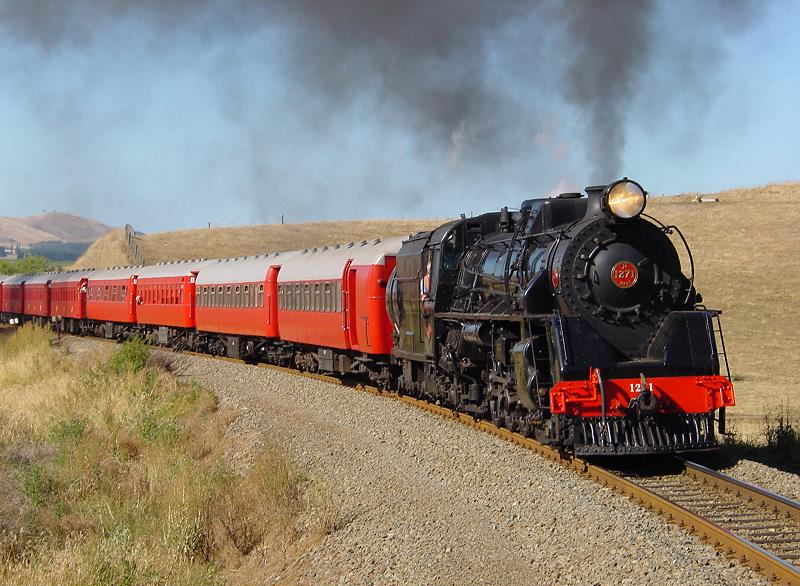
NZR JA class steam loco hauling two NZR 56-foot carriages followed by several NZR 50-foot carriages on an excursion train

The carriages were built at the Addington and Otahuhu Workshops. Later two first class cars were reseated as 37-seat second class cars. Some were altered to car-vans. In 1963-65 some were fitted with multiple-unit type seats for 63 passengers and used for suburban service; initially seven and later another 10, total 17. By 1974 some were used on the Rewanui Branch for miners trains. The Taieri Gorge Railway used to have four of the 50-foot carriages, but has been replacing them with 56-foot carriages.

== Pre-NZR 50-foot carriages ==
The Wellington and Manawatu Railway Company acquired 50-foot passenger cars Class A2 from 1903 to 1906, five first-class and thirteen second-class. The first six were from Jackson and Sharp Company of Delaware, (later the Gilbert Car Company) and later carriages were built at the WMR Thorndon Workshops.

These cars were higher the NZR loading gauge (12 ft 2 1/2 in (3.721 m) rather than 11 ft 6 in (3.51 m)) and were required to be tested before running on Government lines; however in 1911, A 1127 lost ventilators going through a goods shed. In 1940, a ventilator on A 1106 touched the electric overhead live-wires in tunnel 10 on the NIMT and caught fire, after which ex-WMR cars were restricted to the Hutt Valley Line.

== Preserved examples ==
Road number	Location	Notes
A 1120	Silver Stream Railway	Ex Wellington and Manawatu Railway Company
A 1126	Silver Stream Railway	Ex Wellington and Manawatu Railway Company
A 1130	Silver Stream Railway	Ex Wellington and Manawatu Railway Company
A^{A} 1013	Mainline Steam	Used on 1908 "Ministerial Special" and on centenary commemoration train. Mainline certified.
A^{A} 1017	Body on Waiheke Island, Frame at MOTAT	Used on "Ministerial Special", 1908.
A^{A} 1024	The Plains Vintage Railway & Historical Museum	Only preserved car to have the original center-toilet configuration
A^{A} 1025	Steam Incorporated	Stored awaiting overhaul for mainline running.
A^{A} 1030	Steam Incorporated	Mainline certified excursion carriage.
A^{A} 1060	Rimutaka Incline Railway Heritage Trust	Stored
A^{A} 1068	Museum of Transport and Technology	Formerly used at McDonald's, Paraparaumu. Display at MOTAT.
A^{A} 1071	Steam Incorporated	Mainline certified excursion carriage.
A^{A} 1073	Steam Incorporated	Mainline certified excursion carriage.
A^{A} 1132	Kingston Flyer	Preserved as refreshments carriage.
A^{A} 1134	Glenbrook Vintage Railway	Mainline certified excursion carriage.
A^{A} 1135	Unknown	Formerly preserved at now-defunct Tauranga Historic Village museum.
A^{A} 1136	Museum of Transport and Technology	Stored
A^{A} 1233	Glenbrook Vintage Railway	Mainline certified excursion carriage.
A^{A} 1235	Silver Stream Railway	In service
A^{A} 1237	Paraparaumu	Private residence
A^{A} 1258	Glenbrook Vintage Railway	Mainline certified excursion carriage.
A^{A} 1265	Steam Incorporated	Mainline certified excursion carriage.
A^{A} 1267	Steam Incorporated	Mainline certified excursion carriage.
A^{A} 1480	Museum of Transport and Technology	
A^{A} 1484	The Carriage Restaurant, Oakura	Ex Goldfields Railway, Waihi
A^{A} 1489	Mainline Steam	
A^{A} 1494	Glenbrook Vintage Railway	Mainline certified excursion carriage.
A^{A} 1601	Silver Stream Railway	In service
A^{A} 1656	Bay of Islands Vintage Railway	
A^{A} 1669	Mainline Steam	Stored
A^{A} 1670	Steam Incorporated	In early stages of restoration for mainline running.
A^{A} 1678	Goldfields Railway	
A 1702	Taumarunui	Restaurant. Steel clad
A 1707	Downer EDI, Oamaru	Stored. Steel clad
A 1720	Dunedin Railways	Mainline certified carriage. Steel clad
A 1729	Dunedin Railways	Mainline certified carriage. Steel clad
A 1730	Weka Pass Railway	In service. Steel clad
A 1731	Weka Pass Railway	In service. Steel clad
A 1732	Weka Pass Railway	Stored. Steel clad
A 1733	Weka Pass Railway	In service. Steel clad
