= TranzAlpine =

Passenger Train in New Zealand

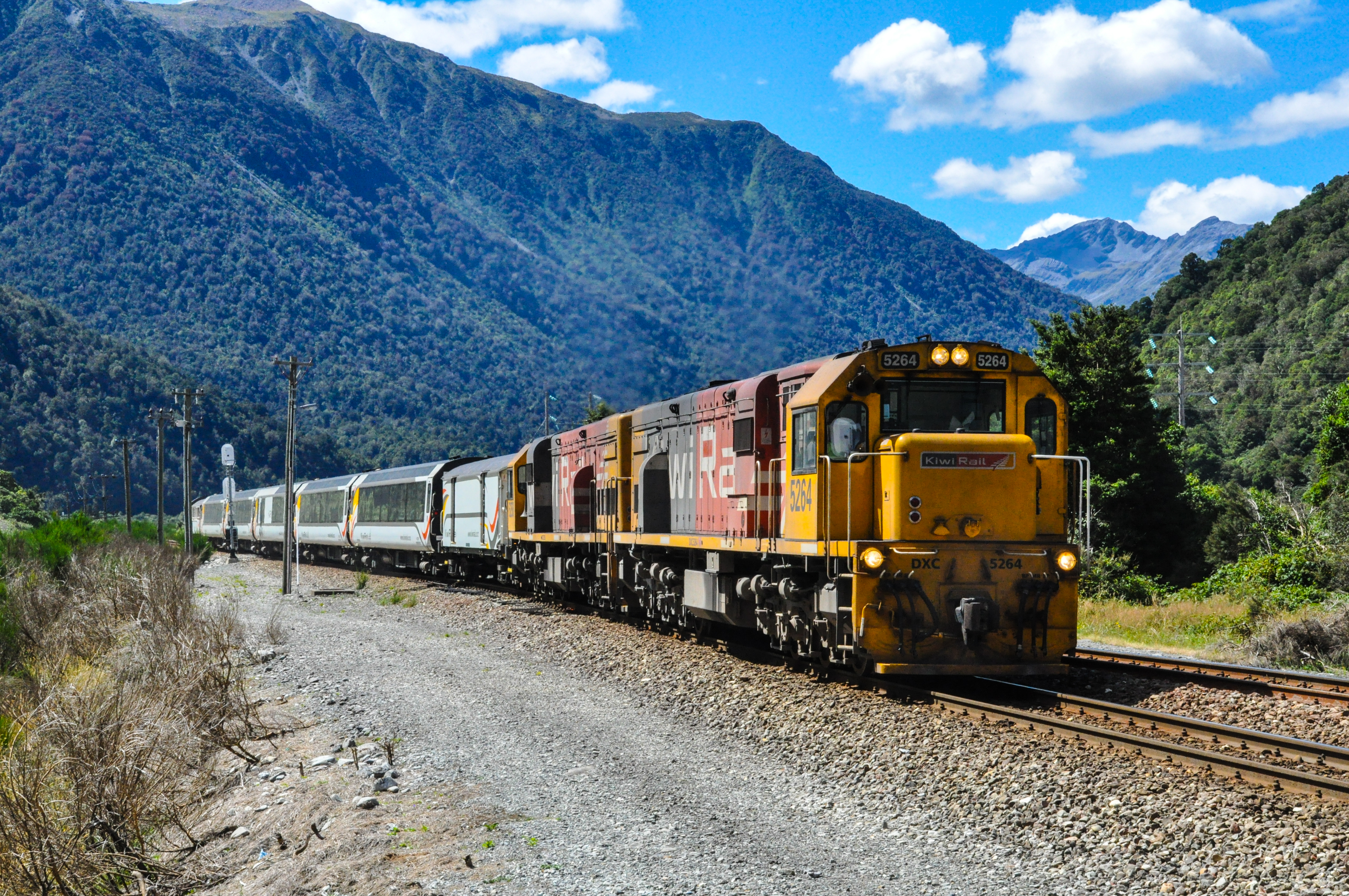
- A TranzAlpine service in Otira

Overview
- Service type: Inter-city rail
- Status: Operating
- Locale: South Island, New Zealand
- First service: 22 November 1987
- Current operator: Great Journeys New Zealand
- Former operators: InterCity Rail (1987–1995); Tranz Scenic (1995–2012); KiwiRail Scenic Journeys 2012–2017
- Ridership: 204,000 (2006 financial year)
- Website: www.greatjourneysnz.com/routes/tranzalpine

Route
- Termini: Christchurch; Greymouth
- Stops: 7
- Distance travelled: 223 km (139 mi)
- Average journey time: 4 hours, 50 minutes
- Service frequency: Daily each way

On-board services
- Classes: Scenic Class, Scenic Plus Class
- Seating arrangements: Airline style Table bay
- Catering facilities: On-board café
- Observation facilities: Large windows in all carriages Open-air viewing carriage
- Baggage facilities: Overhead glass shelves Baggage carriage
- Other facilities: Toilets

Technical
- Rolling stock: Two DX locomotives (Additional Four Locomotives added between Arthur's Pass station and Otira station); Four to six AK carriages One to two AKCs café carriages One to two open-air observation AKV vans One AKL luggage van
- Track gauge: 1,067 mm (3 ft 6 in)

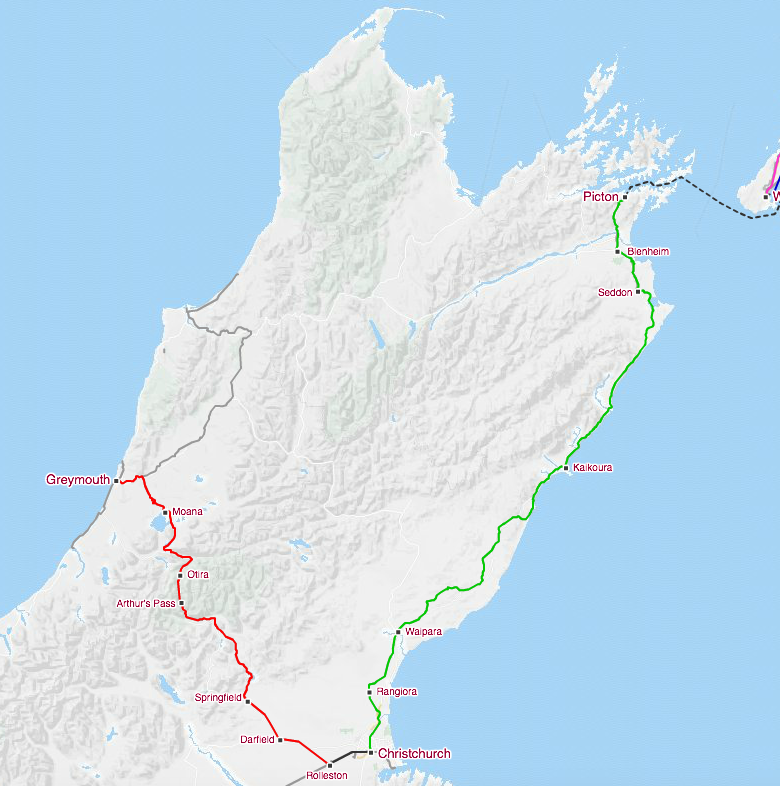
KiwiRail passenger trains in the South Island, ━ TranzAlpine

The TranzAlpine is a passenger train operated by the Great Journeys New Zealand division of KiwiRail in the South Island of New Zealand over the Main South Line and Midland Line; often regarded to be one of the world's great train journeys for the scenery through which it passes (see lists of named passenger trains). The journey is 223 kilometres (139 mi) one-way, taking almost five hours. There are 16 tunnels and four viaducts, with the Staircase Viaduct elevated as much as 75 metres (246 ft).

The train has become increasingly popular, and carried 204,000 passengers in the financial year ending 2007. By 2016, passenger numbers were approximately 130,000 a year, but rising again after the setback of the Christchurch earthquake, and were exceeding pre-earthquake levels.

The TranzAlpine service was suspended in 2020 and again in 2021 because of the COVID-19 pandemic, but resumed on 14 January 2022.

== History ==
The train was introduced on Sunday 22 November 1987 to replace the conventional Christchurch-Greymouth express trains and became one of the New Zealand Railways Corporation's new tourist-oriented passenger services utilising refurbished rolling stock. Accompanying this new-look train were a new-look livery and rebranding.

=== Previous services ===
From late 1982 until 1983, twelve second class NZR 56-foot carriages, three with luggage compartments at one end, were refurbished with new "Supervent" windows, fluorescent strip lights, wall-to-wall carpet, and later still, new seats designed by Addington Workshops were introduced to replace the former articulated diesel-hauled AC class "Grassgrub" carriages. A matching 56-foot van and six 50-foot wooden bogie box wagons for parcels completed the consist. Some of these wagons had served in the same capacity and in the green colour scheme with the Grassgrubs on the Picton and Greymouth routes and one wagon had served the old yellow Northerner as a parcels van, prior to the introduction of the twelve 56-foot carriages. These carriages and wagons, like their Grassgrub predecessors, worked the Picton Express (out and back) and Greymouth or West Coast Expresses (one each way simultaneously). All were painted in a bright red colour scheme.

=== 1987–2012 ===
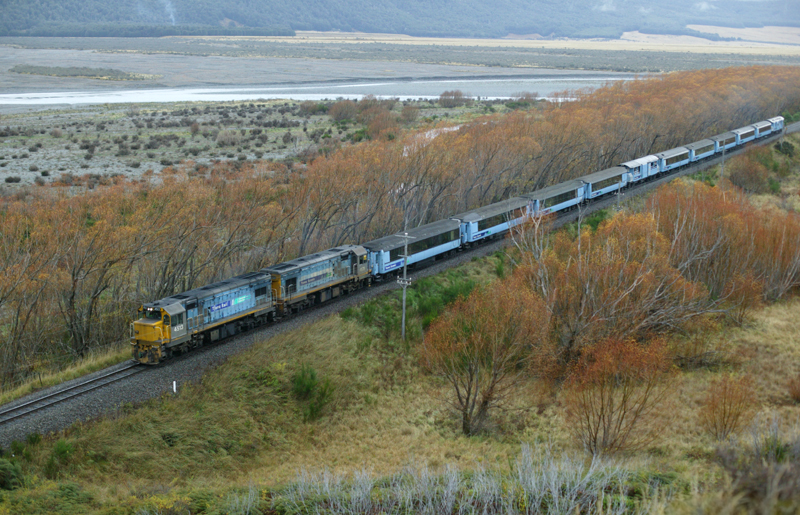
The TranzAlpine, hauled by DC4513 and DCP4628, skirting the Waimakariri River on 24 October 2006.

With the deterioration of the yellow Northerner stock, carriages to replace these had to be found by sourcing from the rest of the NZR 56-foot carriage fleet. The change in service was marked, with a refurbished modular FM van turned power-luggage van with handbrake end-mounted 11 kW petrol generator, and three carriages, one from the Endeavour Express and later Southerner Express converted into a servery car seating 31 in reupholstered Addington Workshops-produced seats, in bays of four with two pairs of seats each facing into a table, arranged alcove-style, with windows over double the size of the old ones, enabling better views of the alpine scenery, reupholstered seats and carpet, and a buffet counter service, to replace refreshment stops at railway station cafeterias at Springfield and Otira. The original intention had been to replace each pair of windows with one larger window, but the final solution was to cut out the side of the carriages and to insert a steel ladder frame to which sheets of strengthened glass were glued. The effect, of a continuous sheet of glass the length of the carriage, was spectacular and undoubtedly was a major factor in the success of the new service. The other two carriages were red Picton – Greymouth carriages that were refitted and repainted to the same standard but retained their smaller windows and seated 50, same seating arrangement and type as the servery car.

Reducing the service to an "out and back" format as opposed to "one each way" freed up carriages for other services, and by refurbishing existing stock it was hoped that the move would draw people to the previously poorly-performing Greymouth passenger trains. The service proved to be popular, with patronage doubling in the first year, with 7,183 passengers in January 1988 alone.

Soon, two more Picton – Greymouth carriages were refitted similar to the servery and observation car, so the two small-window carriages could be slotted into the Southerner consists. These new "big window" carriages each sat 51, same seating arrangement and type as the servery car. In the early 1990s, the first generation TranzAlpine panorama carriages had a new pressure ventilation system installed, similar to the Bay Express and the observation carriage introduced to this train in 1991.

In 1988, the train won a Tourism New Zealand Award and was voted as one of the top 10 "short" train journeys in the world. This was the result of the work of a freelance consulting designer and writer Paul Teague, who also worked at the Christchurch Press. His consulting was initiated by John Bennett, Canterbury and Westland Branch manager at the time. John Bennett was soon after promoted to Intercity National Manager, perhaps as a result of the work.

Initially, the locomotives that were used on the service were DJ class locomotives, and, following the withdrawal of the DJ class in the early 1990s, two DC class locomotives. DF class locomotives were only sporadically used in 1992. As the train became longer, one or two DX class locomotives were used from December 1992, or sometimes a DC and DX class locomotive each.

=== 2012–present ===
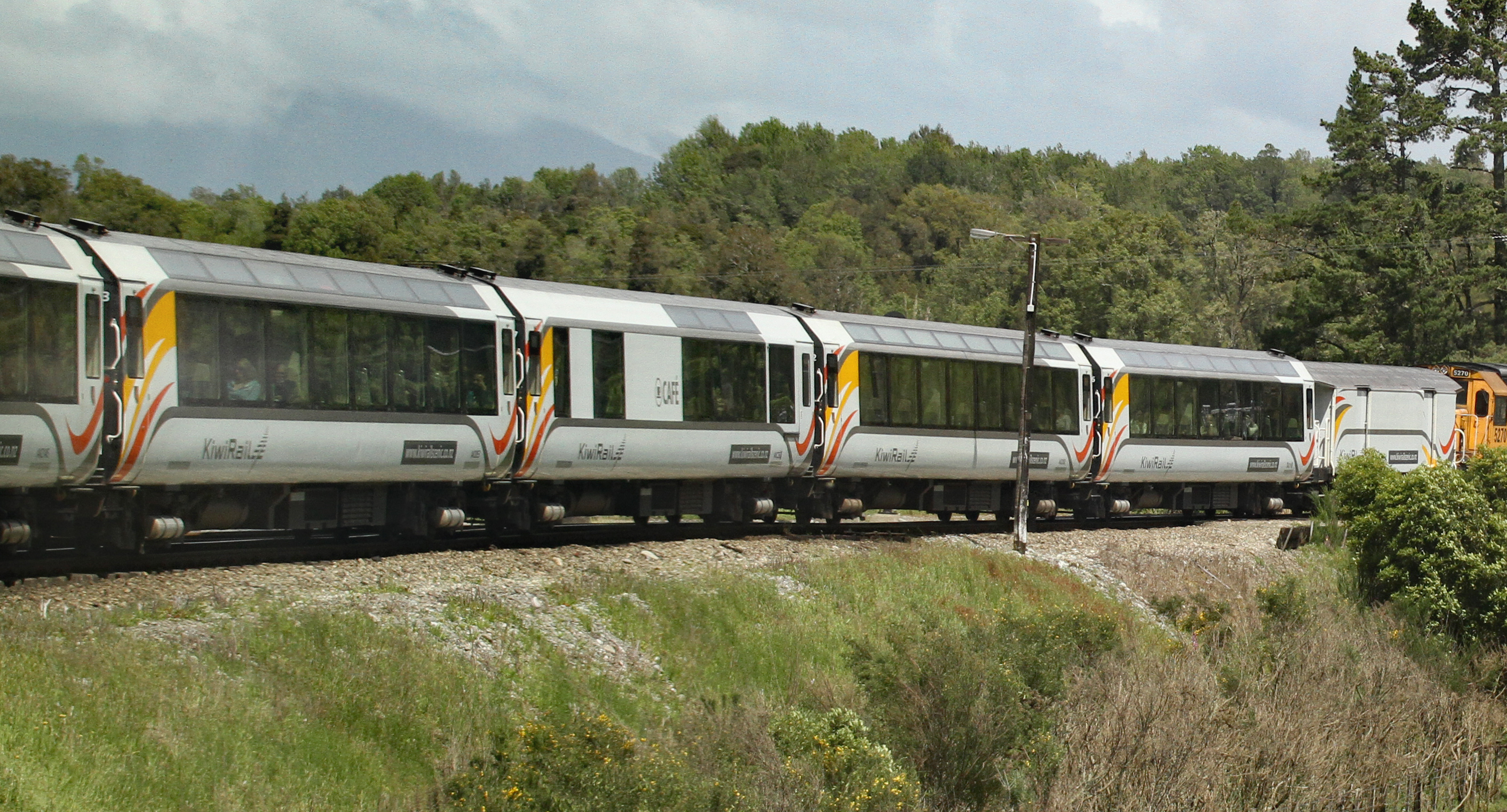
AK class carriages that are used on the TranzAlpine.

On 26 November 2012, the new AK class carriages that were built at Hillside Workshops, were introduced on the service replacing the "big-window" AO carriages. Since mid-2013, fire-suppressed DXC locomotives have been assigned to the service.

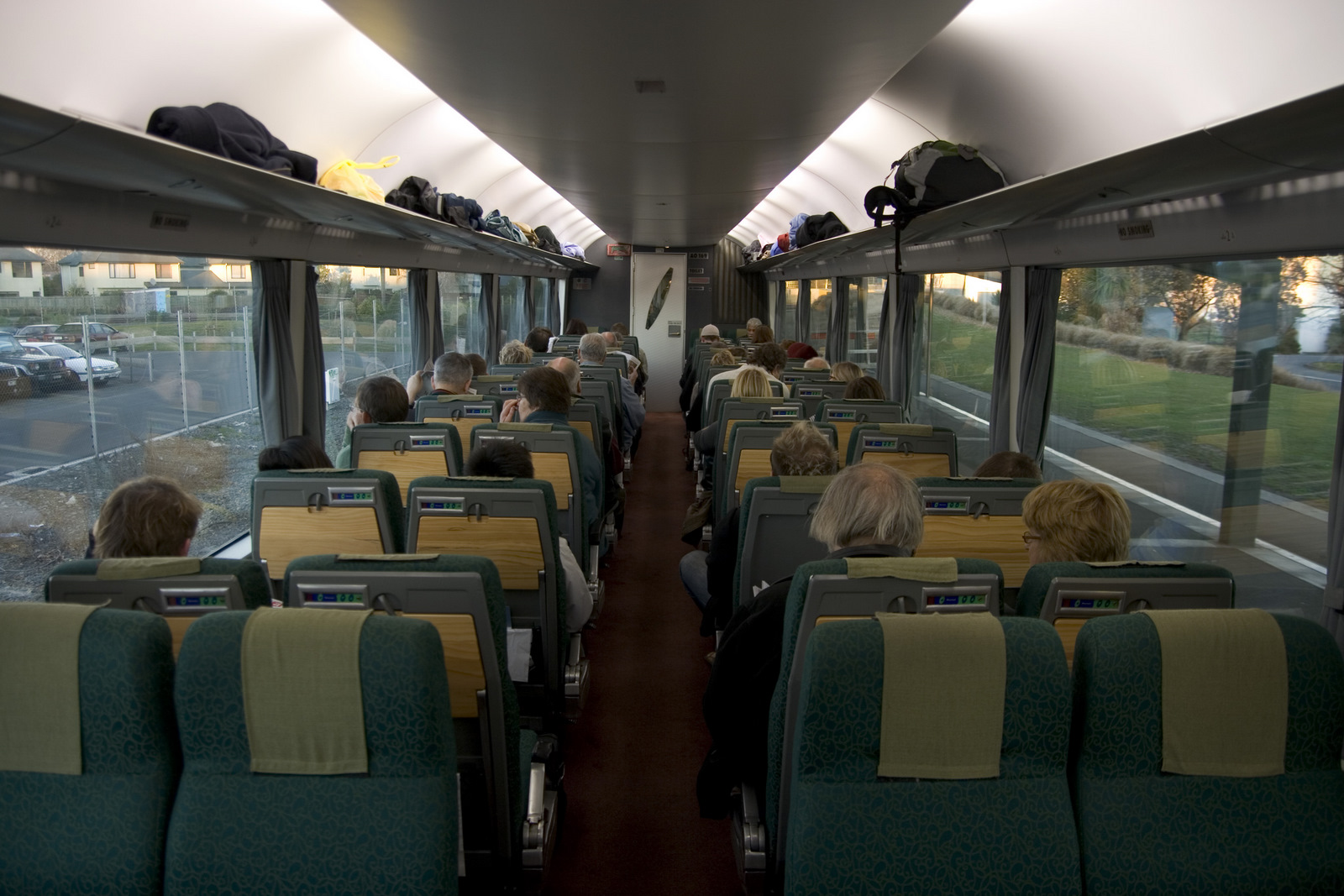
Interior of a 56-foot carriage

=== Increasing popularity ===
The TranzAlpine's popularity increased, and on days the Southerner was not operating it was common to see these carriages bolstering the three hard-pressed TranzAlpine carriages. In 1991, a Southerner power-luggage van had the end module away from the handbrake end converted into an open viewing area for passengers to enhance the already spectacular scenery on the route. Realising this increased public attention, and with the success of air-conditioned panorama carriage trains on the North Island Main Trunk, between August 1994 and April 1995, eight carriages (one a former Southerner then InterCity spare buffet car, one a former Endeavour later Southerner servery car, two from the Northerner, two from the Southerner and two from Auckland suburban services) were extensively overhauled and refitted with panorama windows like the earlier TranzAlpine, TranzCoastal (later Coastal Pacific), pressure-ventilated Bay Express and air-conditioned Northerner/Overlander Express trains and seating 50 (day carriages) and 26 (servery carriages), alcove-style, in new seats like those installed in refitted Wairarapa Connection and North Island Main Trunk carriages. An FM class modular van was refitted with a 90kW generator in the central module as opposed to the handbrake end modules on NIMT vans, to facilitate converting one end module into a public open viewing area.

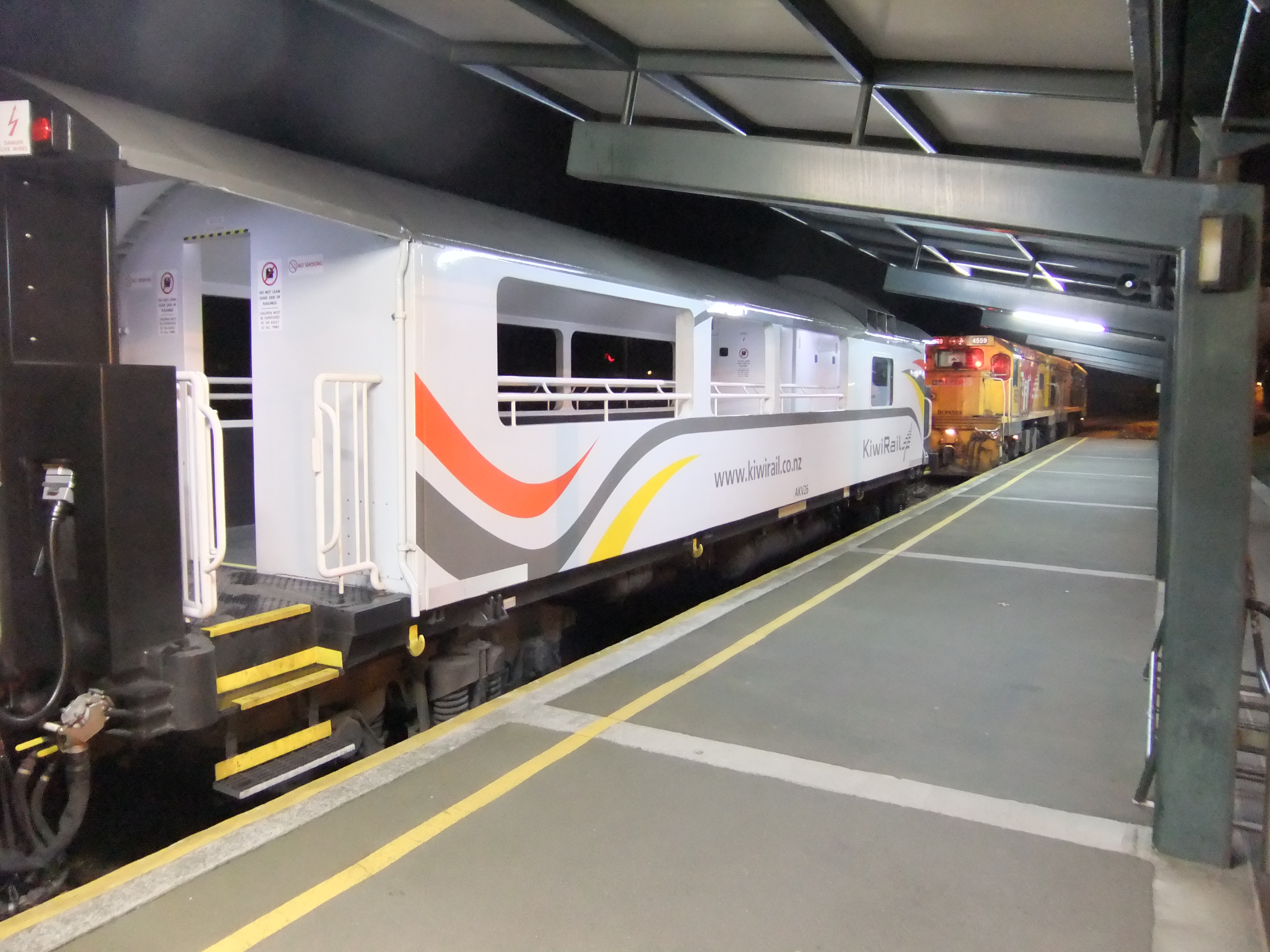
Open viewing carriage

In 1995, the viewing van had its second end module converted for public access to match the first end. This was to facilitate its being marshalled into the centre of the new train, which was now re-organised into two four-car trainsets in one, separated by the power/baggage van. To compensate for luggage on the reformed train, the original TranzAlpine van was stripped of its generator and made to carry luggage only.

In 1998, a second van, which was also one of three so fitted as 11 kW power/baggage vans for the original TranzAlpine and Coastal Pacific, was equipped with 90kW generator housed in the central module, for this train.

Even after the eight air-conditioned carriages were introduced in 1994–1995, the train still borrowed panorama carriages from the Southerner because of the train's increasing popularity.

== Livery ==
As part of the rebranding of the New Zealand Railways Corporation during the 1980s, a new dark blue livery was applied to the TranzAlpine, with a horizontal full-length 220 mm thick white stripe sandwiching a 100 mm thick red band. The name InterCity was imposed into the stripe as well. This dark blue livery would become standard and remain contemporary until 18 October 1995. In 1990, when New Zealand Rail Limited took over rail operations from the corporation, the InterCity livery was modified to facilitate the new blue and yellow primary colours, and the red band on carriage sides was replaced by a 100 mm yellow one. In 1993–1994 the yellow band was replaced by a green 100 mm band, the white stripe and dark blue livery retained. In 1995, a new full-length 350 mm light blue stripe, incorporating the Tranz Scenic logo was introduced on carriages that were not painted all over in the new blue colour scheme. However, during the 1995 rebranding, the TranzAlpine carriages were the first long-distance passenger carriages to receive the new paint scheme and did not wear the transitional light blue stripe.

== Connoisseur service ==
In early 1991, a former Endeavour car was completely rebuilt as a panorama and rear-view car to replace the (first) Connoisseur carriage, that car refurbished in the standard "big window" InterCity seats and tables carriage format. In a continuous attempt to attract the travelling public back to rail, InterCity expanded on what had begun in 1987, when a Southerner car had been leased to a private tourist firm. The original carriage offered enhanced services, including complimentary meals, refreshments and newspapers. However, this second carriage, also named a Connoisseurs' car, and which also offered improved services over those afforded to other TranzAlpine passengers, was transferred to the North Island Main Trunk passenger services by the end of 1991.

== Route ==
The train runs daily between Christchurch and Greymouth. After leaving Christchurch, the train travels through the fertile Canterbury Plains past the Waimakariri River along the Main South Line, to Rolleston. It then turns onto the Midland Line, which passes through the Southern Alps past the spectacular Waimakariri River gorge, via Arthur's Pass and the Otira Tunnel and over the Alpine Fault, terminating in Greymouth, on the West Coast. There are proposals to extend the service from Greymouth to Hokitika.

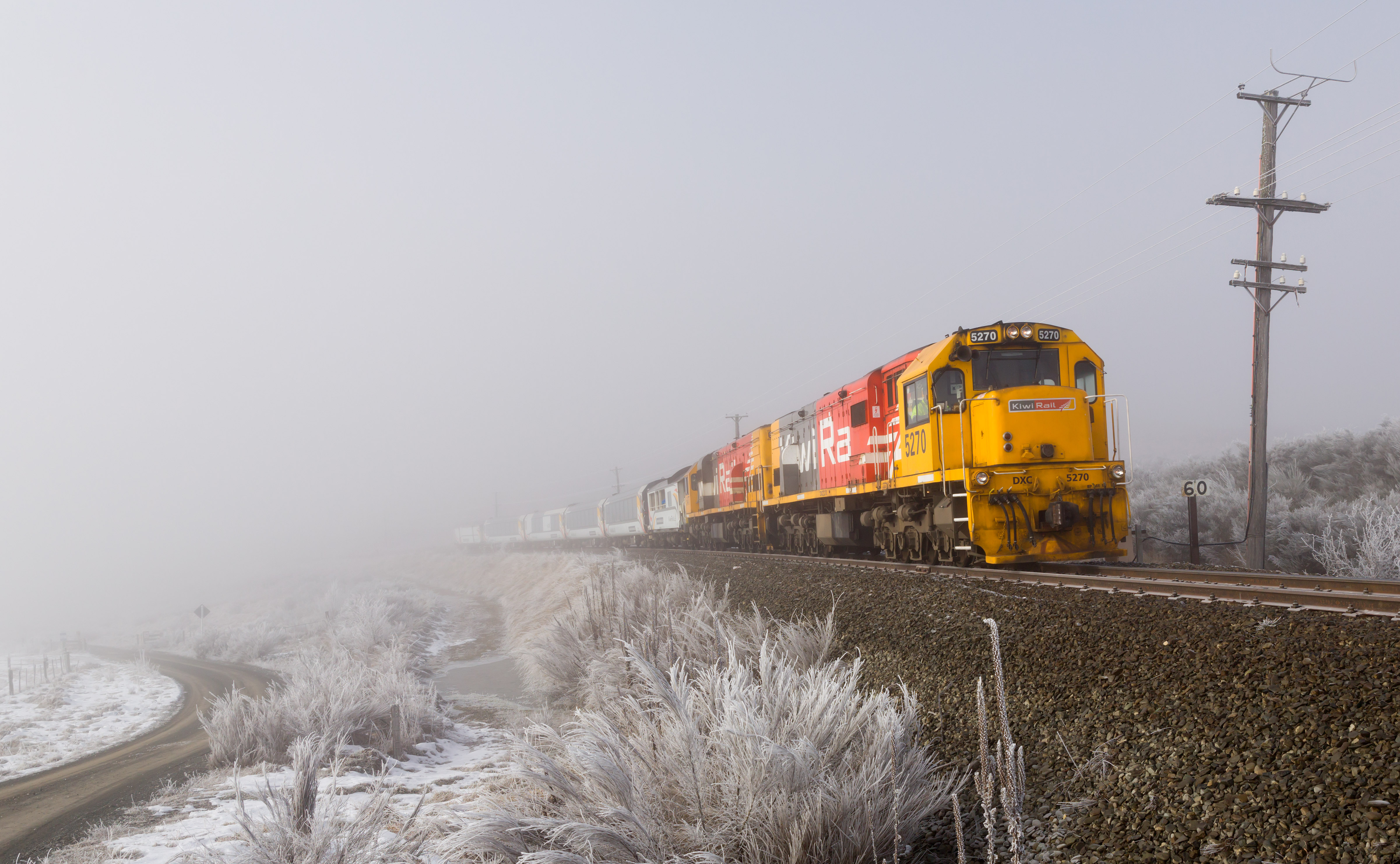
DXC5270 travelling between Cass and Craigieburn

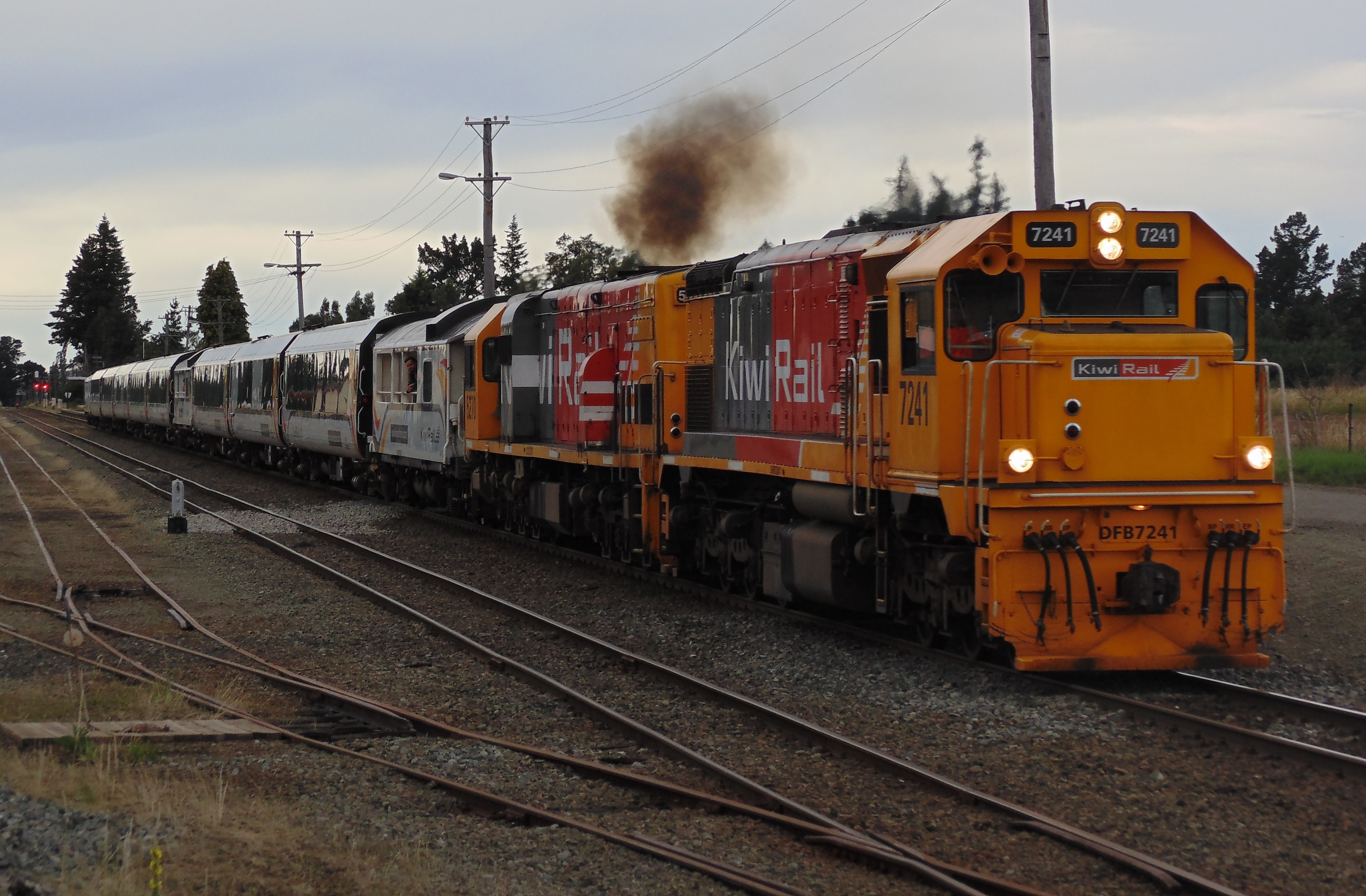
DFB7241 and DXC5270 departing Springfield with the TranzAlpine.

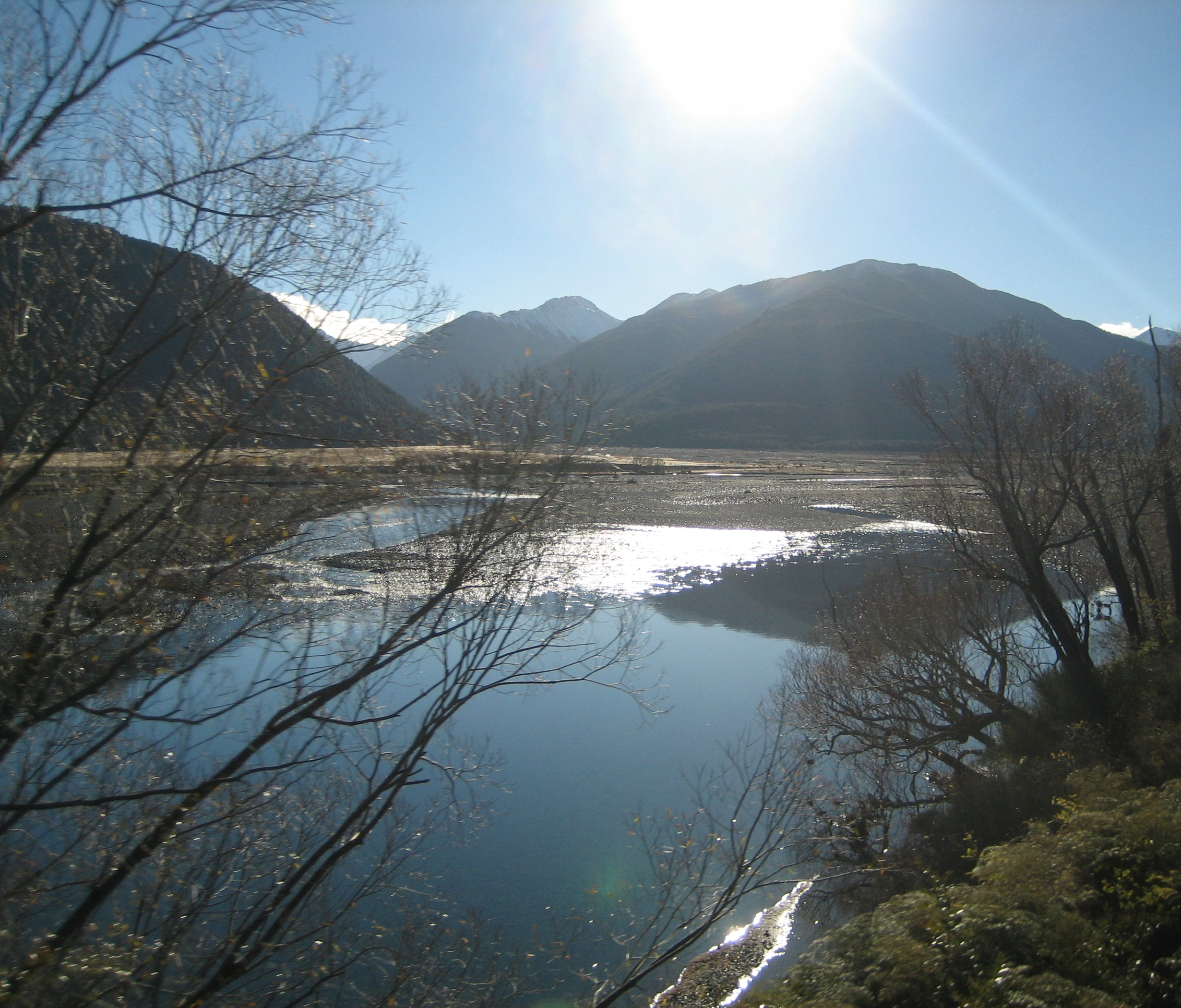
A view of the Southern Alps from the TranzAlpine.

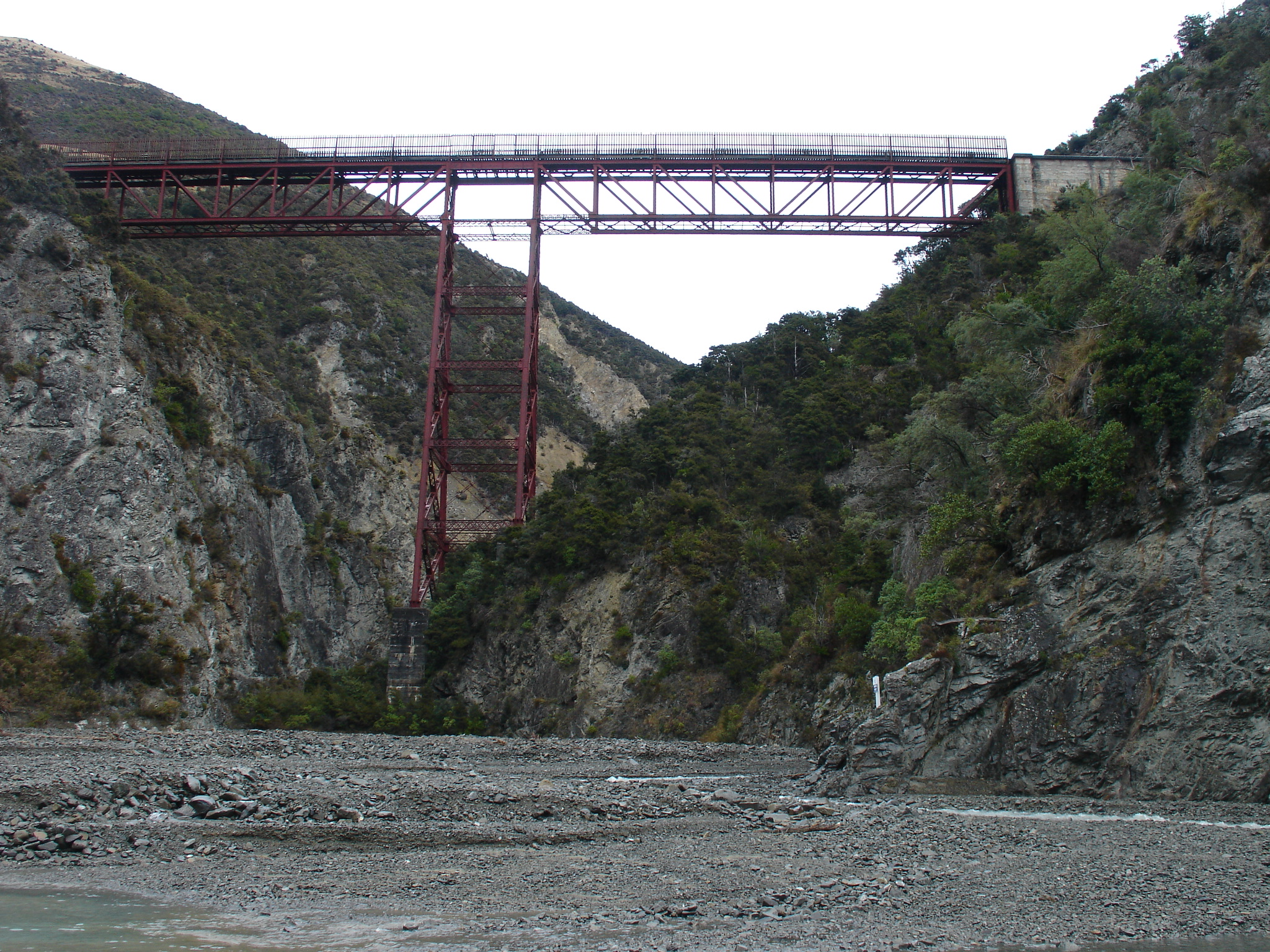
Highest bridge of the TranzAlpine service.

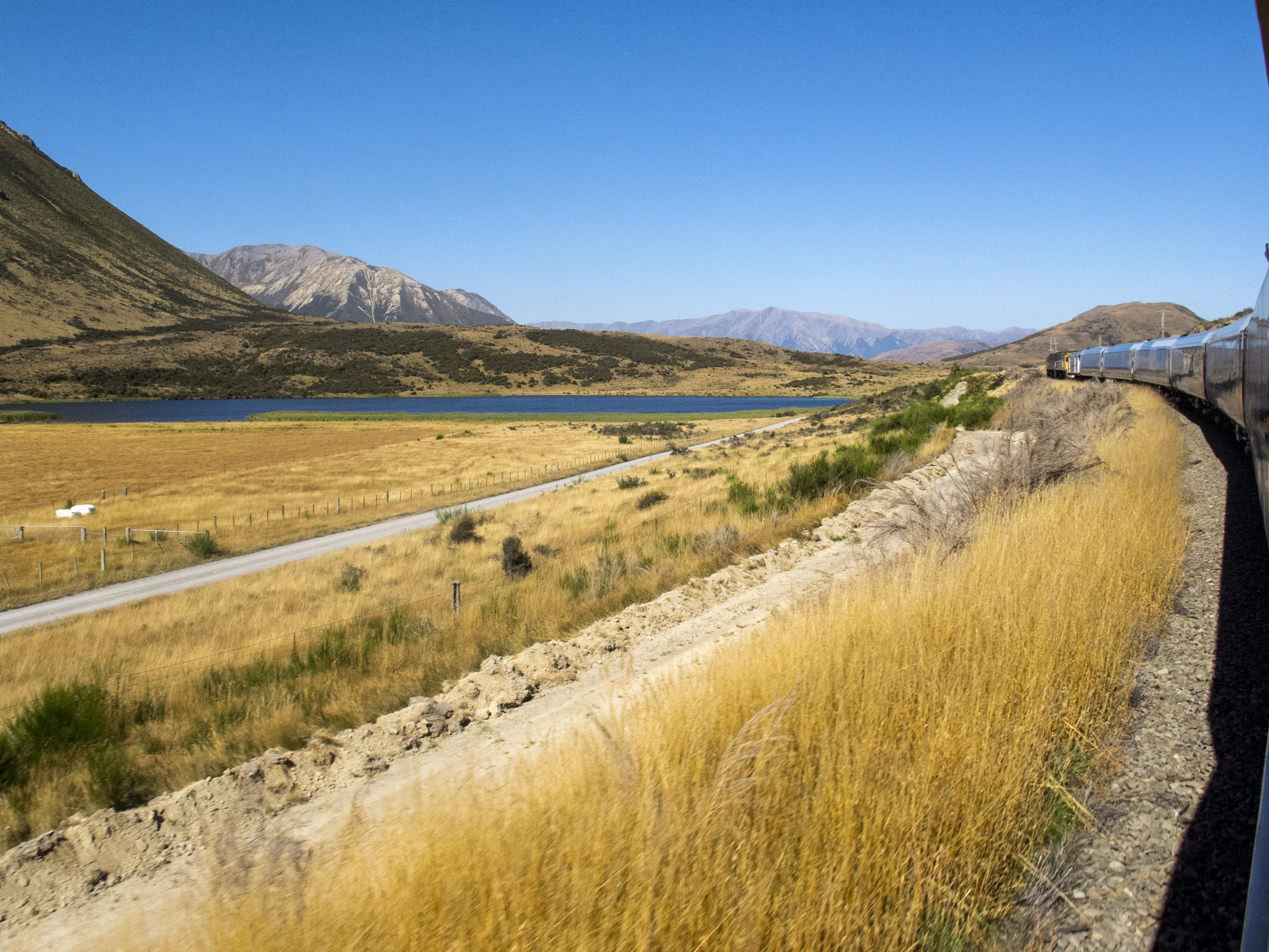
The TranzAlpine Near Lake Sarah.

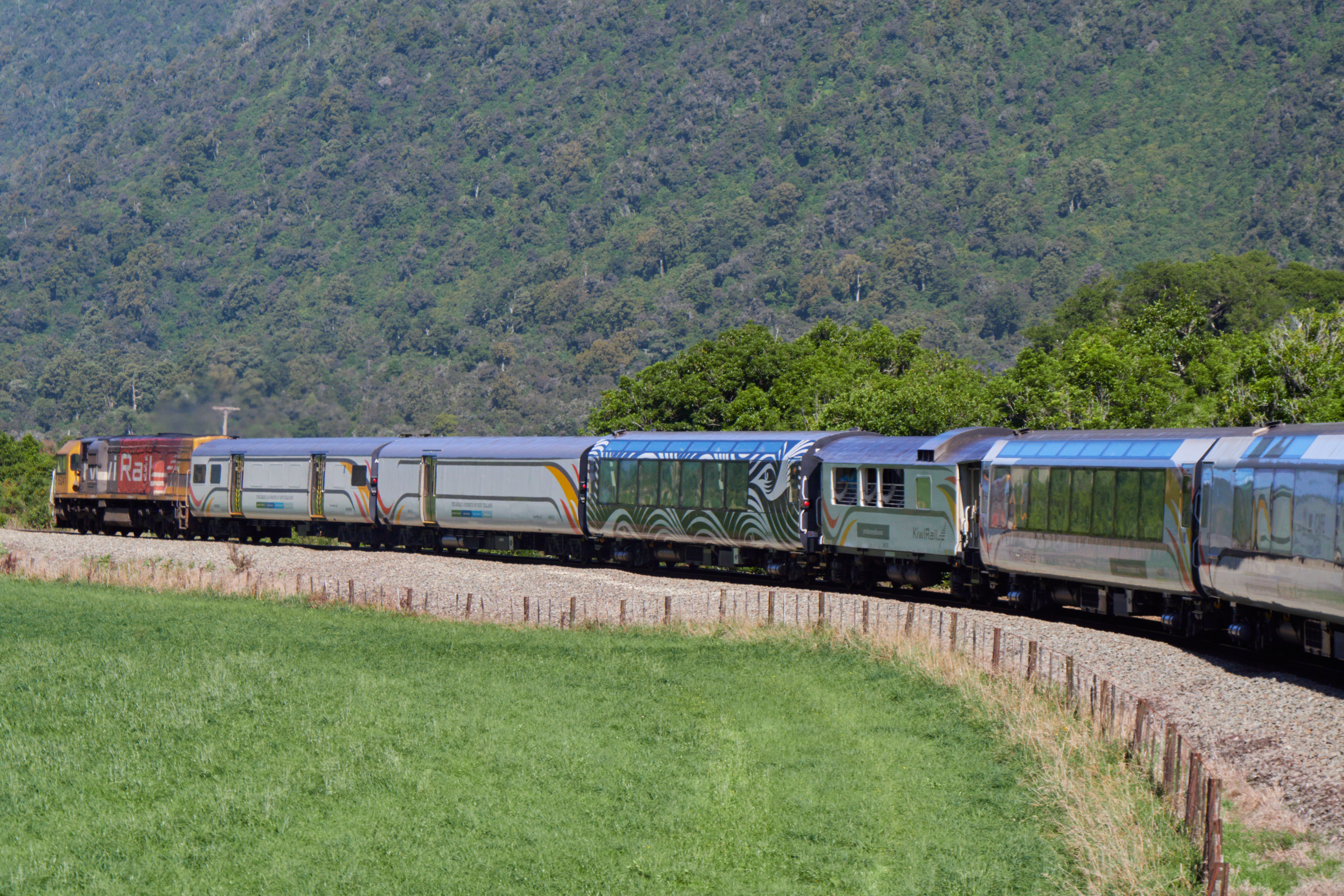
The TranzAlpine near the foothills of the Southern Alps.
