= NZR 56-foot carriage =

Passenger rolling stock in New Zealand

NZR A class 56-foot carriage
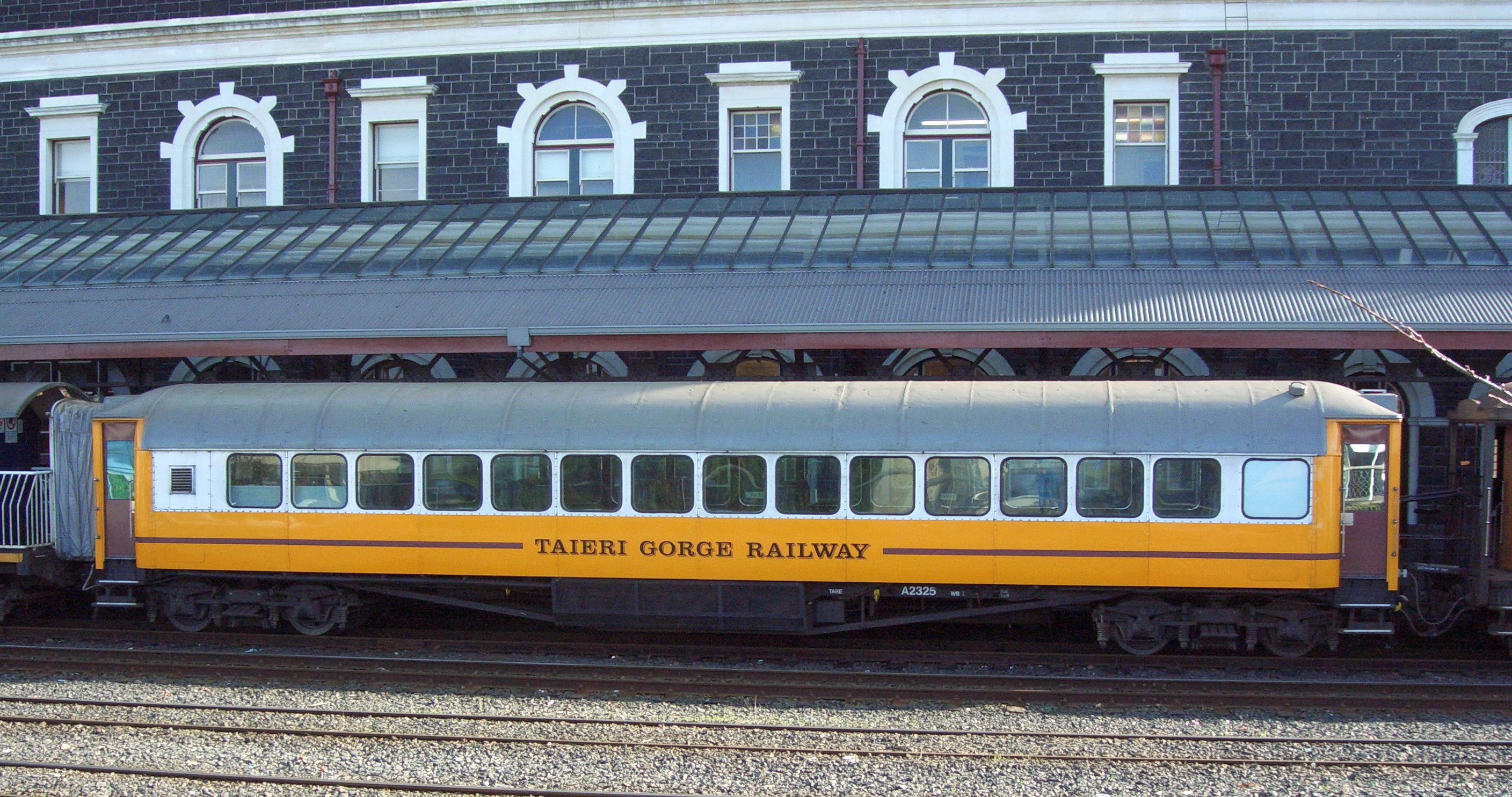
- A NZR 56-foot carriage in service for the Dunedin Railways at Dunedin Railway Station
- In service: 1937–2014
- Manufacturer: New Zealand Railways Department (NZR)
- Built at: Otahuhu, Auckland; Addington, Christchurch
- Constructed: 1937–1945
- Operators: Dunedin Railways, various heritage operators including Mainline Steam
- Line served: various

Specifications
- Car length: 56 feet (17.07 m)
- Track gauge: 3 ft 6 in (1,067 mm)

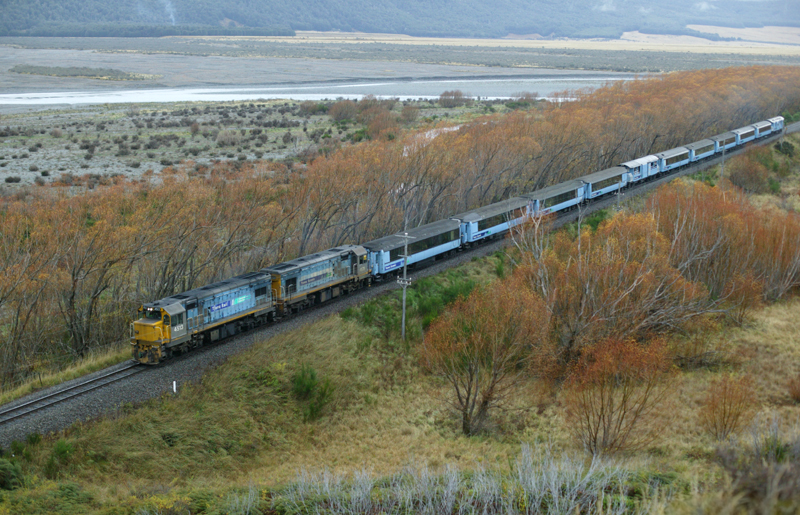
The TranzAlpine, which used up to nine 56-foot carriages

The NZR 56-foot carriage is a type of 56 ft (17 m) long railway passenger carriage formerly used on almost all long-distance passenger rail transport in New Zealand. 88 carriages have been preserved.

== 1927: prototypes and first batch ==
The first 56-foot carriages were built in 1927, being a development of the then-standard steel-panel A^{A} class NZR 50-foot carriages. These first six carriages were 50-foot carriages with lengthened underframes at the ends, and the carriages retained the same bogie spacing as the 50-foot carriages. Designed for sleeper use, these carriages were clad in wood initially. All were given the A^{A} classification due to their limited running rights, and were numbered consecutively from A^{A} 1616 to A^{A} 1622. Later they were clad in steel and given new underframes to match the later 56 ft (17.07 m) carriages.

== 1930s-1940s: second batch ==
It was not until 1937 that further 56-foot carriages were built, to a slightly different design. The new carriages had different bogie spacing and a more rounded profile, to allow general route availability. They were classed A, with the initial batch of 92 being built at Otahuhu Railway Workshops and Addington Railway Workshops. It took until 1945 to complete the order. Further carriages were ordered after 1938, but due to the Second World War, they were never delivered. The 1951 Annual Report noted 127 carriages were "on order" but not under construction; this was substantially reduced to five with the ordering of the 88-seater railcars in 1955, and disappeared altogether in 1957.

There was a large amount of variation in the body arrangement between batches. This primarily reflected the carriage's use – second class (X25480), first-class, first and second-class composite (X25916) or semi sleeping. There were also variations between carriages intended for North Island and South Island use. South Island first-class carriages (X25495) were built with pressure ventilation and a coupe compartment at one end, while North Island first-class carriages (X25485) used roof-based vents like second class carriages, and did not include a coupe. Up to 12 second-class carriages were converted into 20-bed ambulance carriages for use in World War Two and after the war were converted for general use, six of which were converted for first-class use, with four receiving seats of a more modern design, that were later used for the Endeavour and The Connoisseur car. Eight out of 11 semi-sleeper carriages were rebuilt as 16-berth all-sleeper carriages, one rebuilt as a 14-berth sleeper because it retained the original 4-berth cabin. 56-foot carriages quickly became the mainstay of the passenger fleet, being used on New Zealand Railways' most important trains in their red livery.

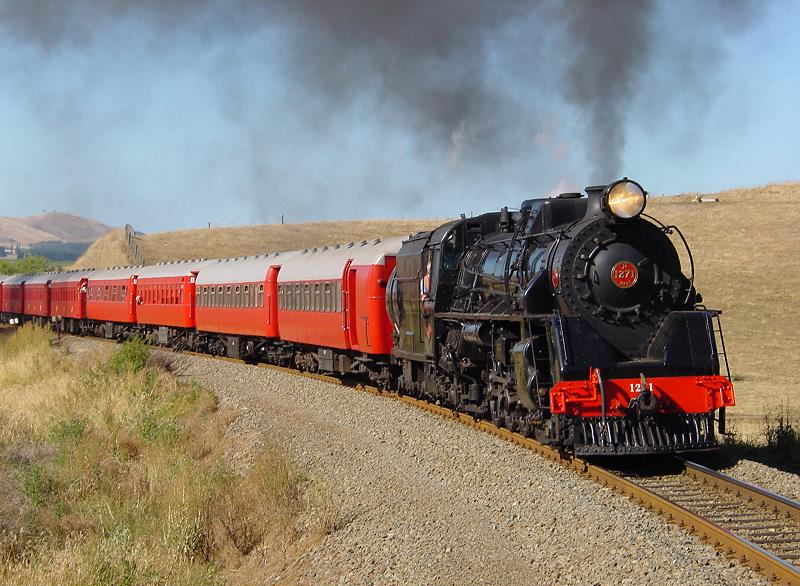
NZR JA class steam loco hauling two NZR 56-foot carriages followed by several NZR 50-foot carriages on an excursion train

The carriages were 56 ft 0 in (17.069 m) long and 11 ft 4 1/2 in (3.467 m) high. The width was 8 ft 11 in (2.718 m) at the waist, reducing to 8 ft 9 1/2 in (2.680 m) at about window height so that the carriages could run over all NZR lines. The extra width allowed second-class seating to have one double seat each side of the aisle, so seating four per row; but first-class carriages had seating for three per row, a single seat on one side and two single seats on the other side of the aisle. The seating for passengers was:

- First class: 31 passengers in single reclining chair seats (a few had 32 or 35 seats)
- Second class: 56 passengers (initially 59 for some 1939-40 Addington carriages with one toilet, but rebuilt to 56-seat with two toilets 1942-43).
- Composite: 14 first-class and 28 second-class; total 42 passengers.
- First class coupe: 29 & 2 triple width seats seating 6; total 35 passengers

The carriages had an enclosed vestibule at each end. The first-class coupe carriages with a small coupe compartment seating 6 had only one lavatory at one end with the coupe compartment at the other end, but most had two lavatories, one at each end, often marked "Gents" and "Ladies".

== Guards van variant ==
In 1942 two Guard's vans were built on the same 56 ft (17.07 m) type underframe to create vans to match the 56-foot carriages. The first two vans had narrow vestibules at both ends, and a further 19 vans built from 1943-44 only had this at one end.

These vans were used on principal expresses in both islands until the 1980s.

== 1970s: upgrades ==
NZR began overhauling a number of 56-foot carriages for a new South Island train called the "Southerner". These carriages were painted blue with a light blue stripe bordered by gold on the sides and white roofs and received new seating and upholstery to match. Some carriages were highly modified into buffet carriages, the first buffet carriages on NZR since 1918. Classified AB, these carriages had a kitchenette and a full-length buffet counter installed. A similar set of carriages was upgraded in the North Island for the new "Endeavour" train from Wellington to Napier. Another set of carriages (including sleeping carriages) was overhauled for a new overnight train between Wellington and Auckland called the "Northerner". These carriages were the first to be turned out with the new "Supavent" style of windows, and were painted a mustard yellow instead of blue. Later, carriages for suburban use in Wellington and Auckland were refurbished with "Supavent" windows as well.

All these upgraded carriages were running on new bogies, after a successful trial of a new "deluxe" bogie under 56-foot carriage A 1622. The bogie type used was initially the same as the steam heat vans (X27750, known as a "Kinki" bogie), and later the type of bogie use by the FM class guards vans (X28020, known as an "FM" bogie), based on the type of bogies used under the Silver Star classed X28250. This improved the ride quality of the carriages.

== 1980s: panoramic glazing ==
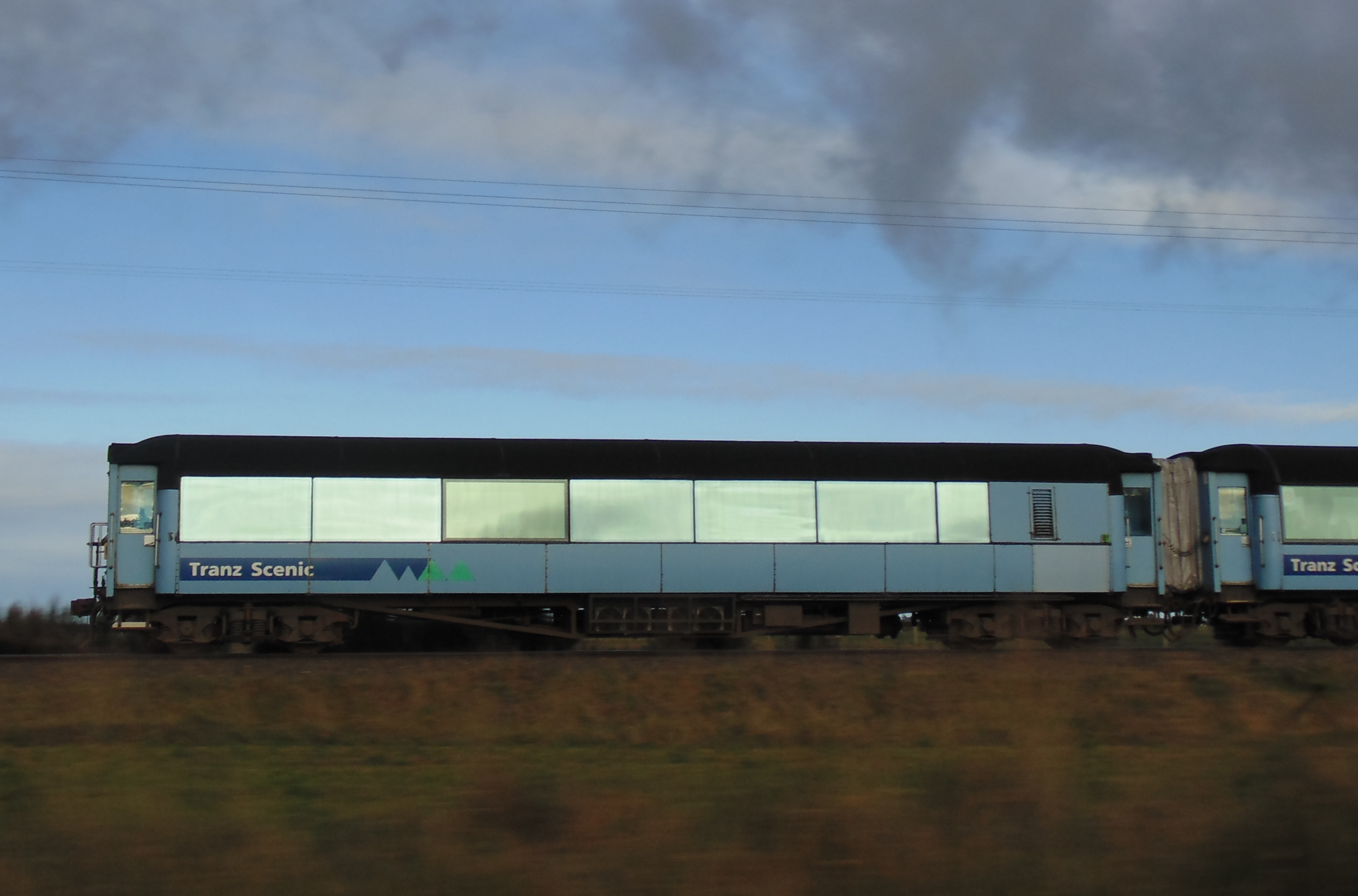
AO 175 while on an excursion.

The next major change for the 56-foot carriages occurred in 1988: the first carriage with 1 meter high panoramic windows, AS2500, was introduced in the South Island for use on the TranzAlpine and later re-numbered ASO27, and was quickly followed by further upgraded carriages, primarily on the TranzAlpine. The second servery car upgraded to this large window configuration was to be numbered AS2517 but was released as ASO 14 – the O for observation denoted the large panoramic windows, and subsequent carriages followed this classification. Further carriages were upgraded over the next five years, and some were fitted with air conditioning, a feature not previously used in New Zealand carriages. Four carriages were modified with lounge seating and a large panoramic window in one end, one car incorporating a servery, but no special classification distinguished these carriages from the other AOs or ASOs. Other carriages were given upgraded seating and new paint colours but remained on the older style bogies and without air conditioning, for commuter and charter use. Later, some of these carriages included air conditioning but retained the smaller Supavent windows

== Current use ==
KiwiRail does not own any 56-foot carriages, a large number of the 56-foot carriages are now either with small train operating companies such as Dunedin Railways with 21 carriages or in preservation with many railway societies, some which use the carriages on mainline excursions.

=== Dunedin Railways ===
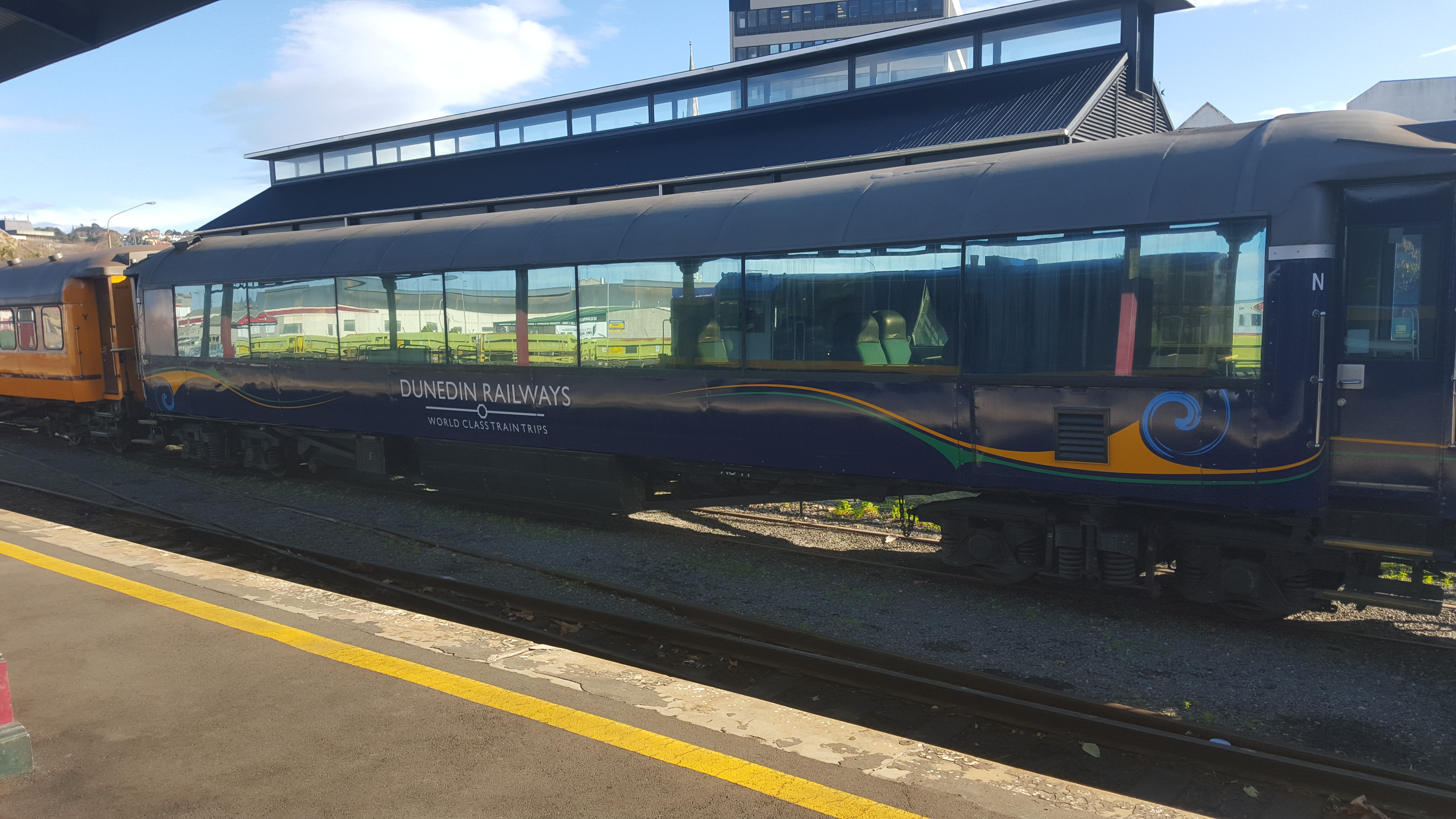
Dunedin Railways branded AO class carriage at Dunedin Railway Station.

Dunedin tourism railway operator Dunedin Railways has phased in 56-foot carriages.

In September 2007 Dunedin Railways announced it had purchased twelve small-window 56-foot carriages formerly used on the Wairarapa Connection. The first of these, A2325, was prepared at a cost of $45,000 and ready in September 2008. Although A2325 was the first carriage put in service, a 13th 56-foot carriage A2095 had been purchased separately earlier and conversion begun to a buffet carriage, which entered service in November 2009. Original plans were to have all 13 small window 56-foot carriages in service by 2013, the cost of a rebuild for these carriages was more than expected due to poor condition of the vehicles. The best condition vehicles were rebuilt for service with the remainder held onto awaiting possible fleet developments and disposal of AO carriages by KiwiRail, with privately owned A3022 and leased AO77 added to the fleet and a new livery around 2013. In 2014 Dunedin Railways offered to store the laid up AO carriages in Middlemarch for KiwiRail, with Dunedin Railways obtaining six of these carriages when they were sold in 2018 along with AO77, giving them seven AO's in total. AO152 was the first of these carriages to be rebuilt for service and was given an all-steel body frame in the process. It is now reclassified ADR152 to distinguish it from a standard AO carriage.

=== Heritage railways ===
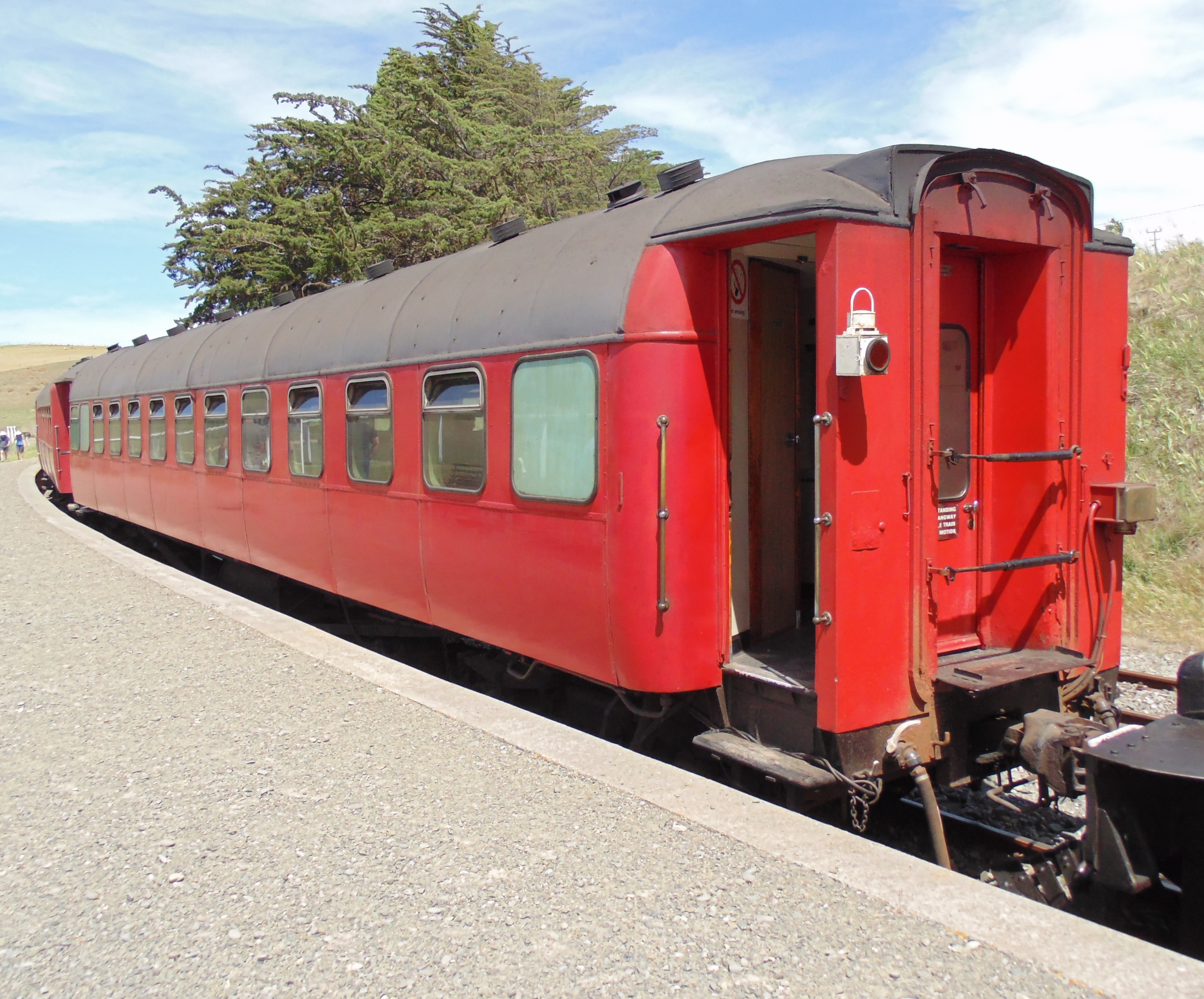
Weka Pass Railways AC 3548 in Waikari.

Many other heritage groups have acquired examples of 56-foot carriages for use on heritage railways or mainline excursions. Most prominent among these is Steam Incorporated, who own 15 carriages of this type (though not all are operational), closely followed by Mainline Steam who have 14 (all of the AO/ASO big window variety). Feilding & District Steam Railway and the Glenbrook Vintage Railway also have large numbers of 56-foot carriages in their fleet, making the 56-foot carriage type the most popular among main line operating groups. Of note, all of the AO/ASO big window 56-foot carriage variety were sold to either Dunedin Railways or heritage organisations, although ASO14 was later scrapped by Mainline Steam due to its poor condition. Many other groups own examples of 56-foot carriages, but only one of the original 1927 Prototype batch survives - this being Aa 1618 which is in use by Steam Incorporated as a buffet car.

== Current trains no longer using 56-foot carriages ==
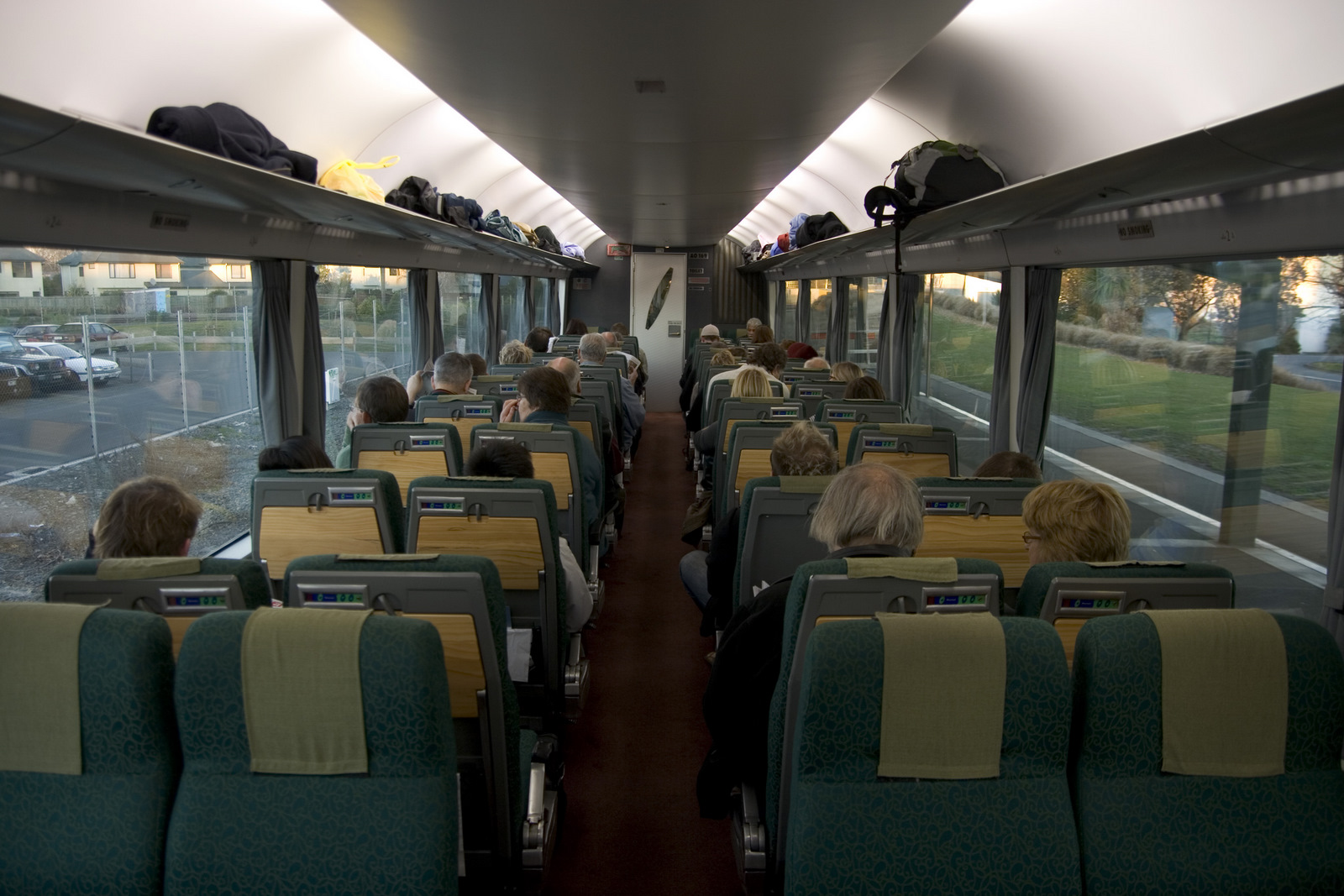
Interior of a 56-foot carriage on the TranzAlpine

=== North Island ===
- Auckland suburban services (replaced with diesel multiple units in 1993)
- Capital Connection (replaced with ex-British Rail Mark 2 stock in 1998)
- Wairarapa Connection (replaced with ex-British Rail Mark 2 stock in 2007)

=== South Island ===
- Coastal Pacific (replaced with brand new Hillside Workshops built AK class carriages in late 2011)
- TranzAlpine (Christchurch-Greymouth) (replaced with brand new Hillside Workshops built AK class carriages in November 2012)

== Former trains that used 56-foot carriages ==
=== North Island ===
- Overlander (Wellington-Auckland)
- Bay Express
- Endeavour
- Northerner
- Scenic Daylight

=== South Island ===
- Lynx Express
- Southerner
- Coastal Pacific

== Classification ==
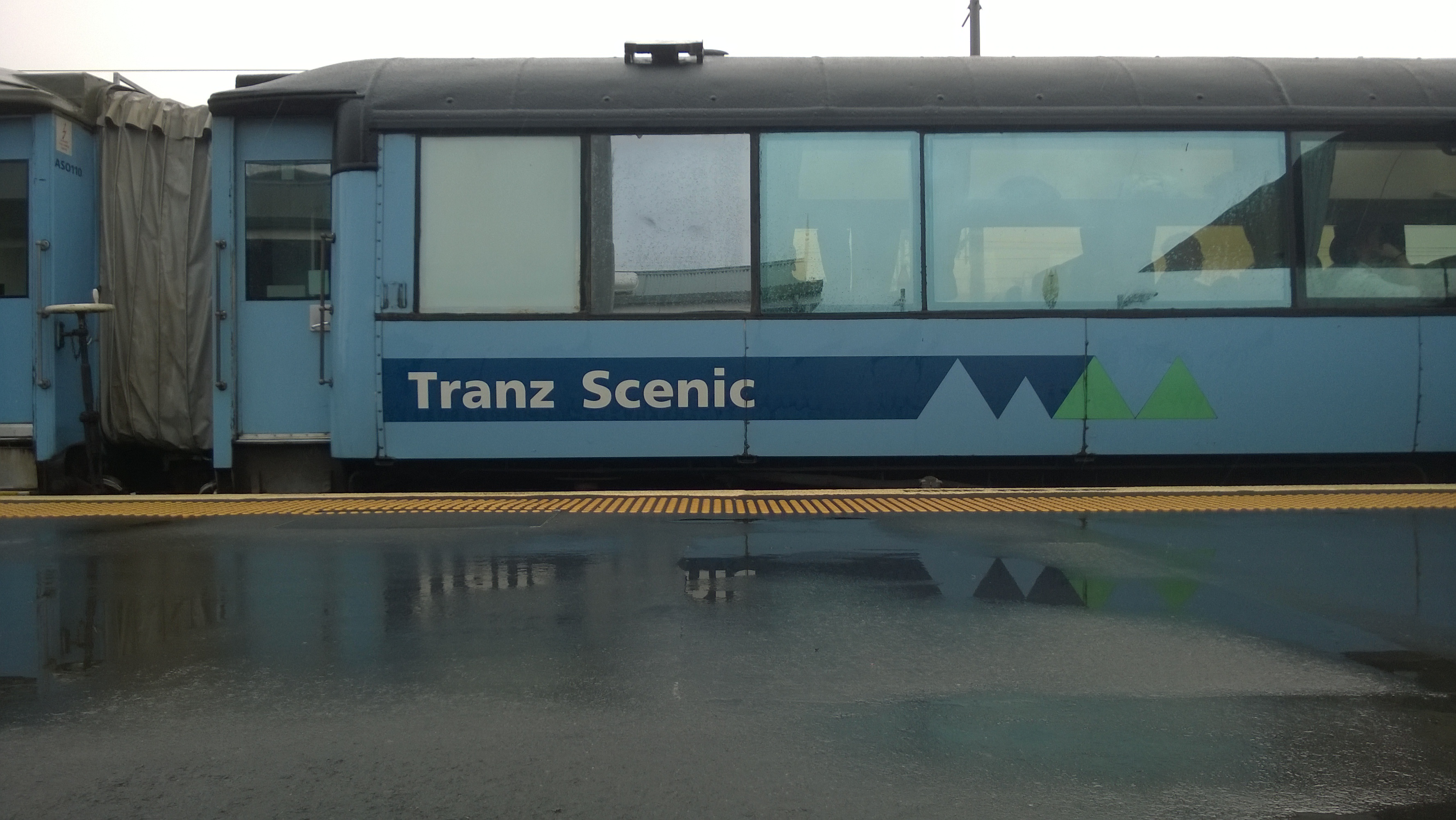
An AO Class NZR 56-foot carriage on the Northern Explorer at Papakura during temporary withdrawal of the AK class carriage fleet.

- A passenger car
- AL car-van (with luggage compartment)
- AO panoramic windows
- AS servery
- ASO panoramic windows and servery
- F guards van
