= Greymouth railway station =

Railway station in New Zealand

Greymouth
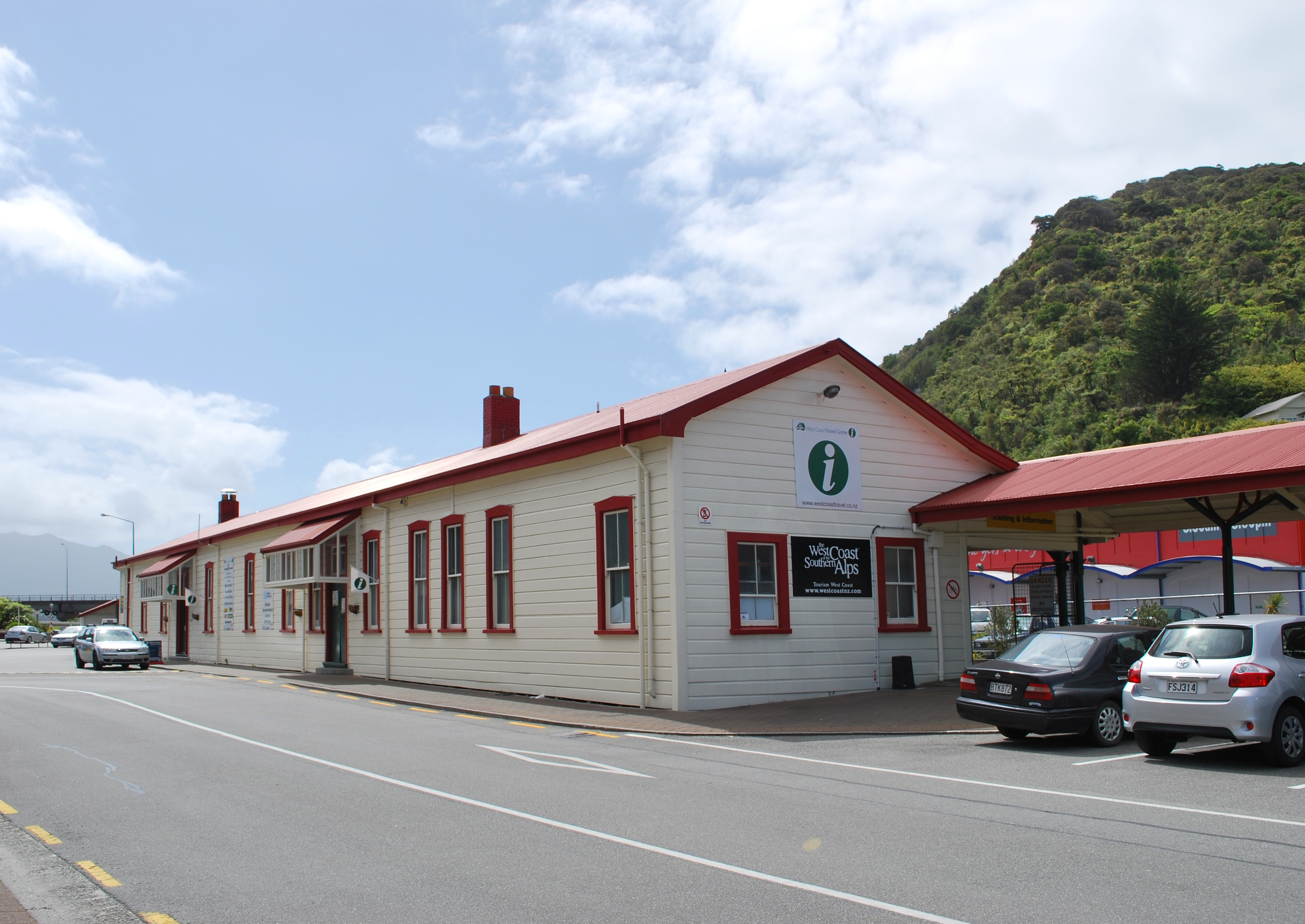
- Greymouth Railway Station on 30 November 2011

General information
- Location: Mackay Street, Greymouth, New Zealand
- Coordinates: 42°26′54″S 171°12′52″E
- Owner: KiwiRail
- Operator: The Great Journeys of New Zealand
- Line: Midland Line
- Platforms: Single side
- Tracks: Main line (1)

Construction
- Parking: Yes
- Architectural style: Vogel class 2

Other information
- Classification: RHTNZ Category A

History
- Opened: 8 April 1876
- Rebuilt: 1897

Services
Preceding station	Great Journeys New Zealand	Following station
Moana towards Christchurch	TranzAlpine	Terminus

Heritage New Zealand – Category 1
- Designated: 28 June 1990
- Reference no.: 3039
Location

Greymouth railway station serves the town of Greymouth, on the West Coast of New Zealand. It is the northwestern terminus of the Midland Line.

== Location ==
The station is on Mackay Street, at the eastern end of the Greymouth town centre. It is at the northwestern end of the Midland Line, where it meets the Hokitika Line.

== History ==
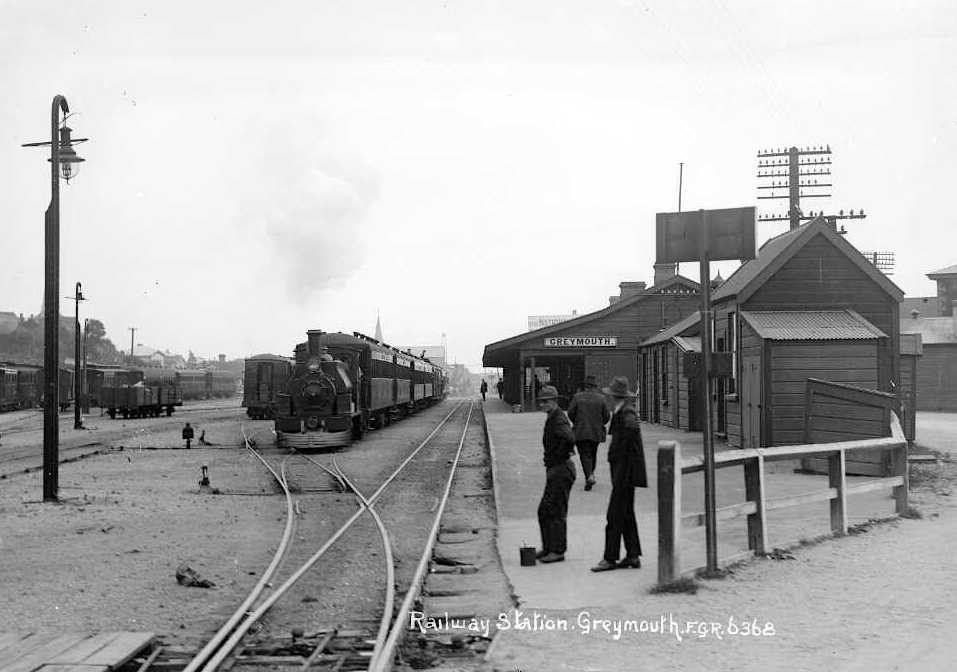
Greymouth Station in the early 1900s

The first station in Greymouth was opened in 1876, as the terminus of a railway between Greymouth and the coalmine at Brunner. As the railway system of the West Coast grew, the station in Greymouth became the centre of the region's railway network, and was of particular importance to goods traffic from the region's primary industries as it served the main port in the area. As such, the station became unsuitable for the amount of traffic it was handling, and it was rebuilt in the mid-1890s, with the new station opening in 1897. Despite the rebuild, the station was still considered inadequate, and extra facilities were added at the station several times in the early 1900s. After the Otira Tunnel opened linking the West Coast and Canterbury in 1923, passenger traffic further increased with the introduction of services to Christchurch; a footbridge was erected to handle the increased usage. During the later part of the 20th century, traffic declined significantly, as both passengers and freight shifted to road transport. The station was modernised in 1998, and several outbuildings were removed.

The station is listed by Heritage New Zealand as a Category I Historic Place. This is due to its architectural quality as a relatively unaltered example of a second-class New Zealand railway station, and its historical significance as a former centre of the regional rail network.

== Services ==
The station is currently served by the TranzAlpine, which runs daily between Greymouth and Christchurch, and is operated by The Great Journeys of New Zealand, KiwiRail's scenic division.
