= Endeavour (train) =

Passenger train in Aotearoa/New Zealand

The Endeavour was a long-distance passenger train service between Wellington and Napier (and for part of its history, Gisborne) in the North Island of New Zealand. The service was modelled on the Southerner service in the South Island, and operated from Sunday 6 November 1972 to Sunday 10 November 1989.

== History ==
=== Introduction ===
The Endeavour was introduced on Sunday, 6 November 1972 as a carriage train to replace the morning railcar service between Wellington and Napier. The 88-seater railcars used on this route were deteriorating due to age and were unreliable, and the success of the Southerner inspired the creation of the Endeavour. In its first incarnation, it was hauled by a DA class diesel electric locomotive and had a consist of a guard's van, five passenger carriages and a buffet car. The Endeavour's carriages were painted in a distinctive blue livery rather than the red scheme usual at the time, and the locomotive carried a headboard, the only instance of regular headboard use in the country at the time. The new train ran roughly to the railcar timetable, taking five and a half hours between Wellington and Napier. Although some railcar services supplemented the Endeavour in its early years, these all ceased by the end of 1976, with the Endeavour proving more popular with passengers.

The consist was five former second class NZR 56-foot carriages that had been converted to 20-bunk ambulance carriages in World War Two. When peacetime resumed, the five cars were fitted out in the late 1940s and early 1950s with 35 first-class seats to a newer design, and one car trialled fluorescent lighting and individual overhead at-seat reading lights, which became a standard feature on the Northerner. These newer seats were retained and reupholstered. Three cars seated 36, while two seated 32 to accommodate a staff compartment. The buffet car was a 56-ft two-lavatory first-class car, later designated a North Island Main Trunk first-class carriage, seating 31. This car was completely rebuilt to incorporate a full-length counter with 20 stools alongside. One 56-ft van was added to the train, also thoroughly rebuilt. A second van, similarly fitted, was added later.

A sixth second-class carriage had been similarly fitted with 35 first-class seats to the newer 1950s design and, because of the increasing popularity of the Endeavour, was regularly added to this train to help carry extra passengers, especially in holiday times. The car was refitted for permanent service on this train and had a staff compartment built-in. It now seated 32.

=== New bogies ===
With the success of the Korean-built bogies on the Northerner cars, the Endeavour cars were later fitted with this type of bogie. Work on Endeavour car underframes was not as substantial as that carried out on the Northerner underframes.

=== Buffet car removed ===
On Saturday, 8 August 1981, the Endeavour had its buffet carriage withdrawn as an economy measure. As a result, the schedule was amended to extend the stop at Palmerston North railway station so passengers could purchase refreshments at the station cafeteria.

=== Extension to Gisborne ===
The Endeavour initially terminated in Napier with a connecting service operating between Napier and Gisborne, which last operated on 30 May 1976. For approximately two years, no passenger service operated between Napier and Gisborne. On Monday 20 March 1978 a Napier-Gisborne return rail service was re-introduced, using a pair of AC class "Grassgrub" carriages. This service connected with the Endeavour at Napier.

On Tuesday, 18 August 1981, one of the three Silver Fern railcars derailed near Waiouru on the North Island Main Trunk (NIMT) and the next day, the Endeavour's entire consist was diverted to the NIMT as a substitute, known as the Blue Fern. 56-foot class carriages were reallocated from elsewhere in New Zealand to provide a through Wellington-Gisborne service, with the AC cars for Gisborne reallocated elsewhere in the network.

Some of the 56-foot class carriages had been moderately refurbished with fluorescent strip lighting and a newer type of window, but still with bench seats. By October 1982 it was able to be operated by more comfortable AC "Grassgrub" carriages. The northbound service left Wellington at 7:45 am and reached Gisborne at 6:30 pm, the southbound left Gisborne at 9:55 am and reached Wellington at 8:40 pm. As it lacked a buffet car, stops were made for refreshments in Napier and Palmerston North. Around this time, the train stopped carrying its distinctive headboard.

The AC class "Grassgrub" carriages did not last long on the Wellington-Gisborne express, as they were not designed to be towed.

When four of the six Endeavour carriages (three cars seating 36, the fourth 32) previously used returned to the run in May 1984, the better three of the red Gisborne-Napier carriages were reassigned to the Masterton commuter service, but during busy holiday periods they saw regular duty on the Gisborne Expresses.

=== New route, new seats ===
On Tuesday, 11 September 1984, two Southerner cars, which had been exchanged for the other two Endeavour cars, one with 50 (ex 33) seats, the other 45 (ex 29) seats, and two 46- seat car-vans with luggage space at one end, three FM class modular guard's vans for luggage and two 50-ft wooden box wagons for parcels traffic were added to the four Endeavour cars to form two new Gisborne Express consists. All eight cars had been progressively fitted out with a new design of seat from Addington Workshops, which had proven successful on the Picton/Greymouth trains.

The two reseated Southerner cars returned to the South Island once all four Endeavour cars and the two cars with luggage spaces received their new seats.

Like the Produce Express (the name given to the Grass Grubs used while Endeavour carriages assumed duty on the NIMT) before it, steel box wagons were towed along at the rear for parcels traffic. The buffet car did not return. The train's reliability began to decline; by this stage, the DA class had been withdrawn or converted into the DC class, so under-powered DBR class locomotives hauled the train and struggled to keep to the scheduled timetable.

On Tuesday 7 March 1988, Cyclone Bola struck the east coast of the North Island, causing significant damage to the line between Napier and Gisborne. This led to the abbreviation of the Wellington-Gisborne express at Napier, and although the track was repaired, regular passenger trains ceased beyond Napier. Patronage on the Napier-Gisborne section was never high except for occasional holiday traffic, and by turning around the train at Napier the number of carriages needed was halved as one train could do a return trip.

=== Demise ===
In 1987, a program was initiated to upgrade all long-distance passenger trains. The Endeavour was replaced by the Bay Express in December 1989. On Saturday, 4 November 1989, a new timetable was implemented. It had been planned for the Bay Express to have been in service by this date, but because the newer cars were still being rebuilt and both Palmerston North and Napier refreshment rooms closed on the same date, a buffet car was added to the Endeavour consist in the interim. This train ran until Sunday, 10 December 1989 when it was replaced by the Bay Express.
