= NZR FM guards van =

New Zealand FM class guards van
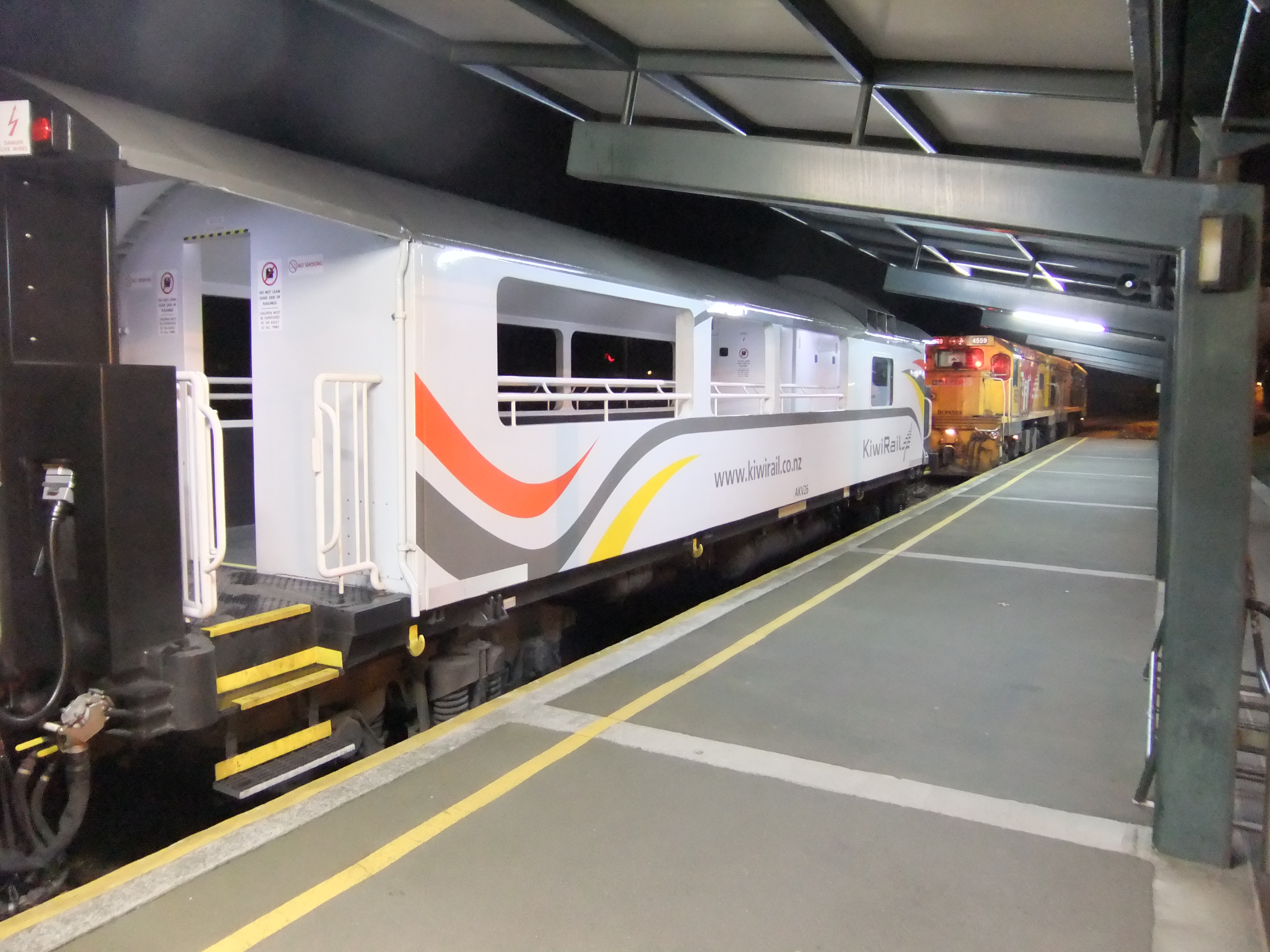
- An AG (ex. FM) class van now converted for use as an open viewing carriage on a TranzAlpine train
- Manufacturer: Mitsubishi
- Constructed: 1977-1981
- Operators: New Zealand Railways Department (NZR); New Zealand Railways Corporation; New Zealand Rail (Tranz Scenic); KiwiRail; Dunedin Railways

Specifications
- Track gauge: 3 ft 6 in (1,067 mm)

The New Zealand FM guards van is a rail vehicle on New Zealand's national rail network by KiwiRail and a number of other operators. Originally used on freight trains, they are now used primarily on passenger trains, reclassified AG, and some maintenance of way trains. Built in two batches by Mitsubishi (1977) and Daewoo (1981), they were the last order of guards vans made by NZR before all guards vans were withdrawn from freight trains in 1987.

== Introduction ==
=== First batch, 1977 ===
In the mid-1970s, New Zealand Railways (NZR) had a need for new guards vans for new vans for both freight and moderately fast passenger and express freight services, to replace old and increasingly decrepit vans. Most of the existing vans were built before 1946, including passenger express vans, with post-war construction being only two batches of 35 and 30 vans in 1955 and between 1963 - 1967.

The New Zealand Cabinet gave approval for made for the van order on 15 May 1973. NZR General Manager Thomas Small made a second request to the Cabinet Works Committee for approval on 15 August 1974, but no work was made on design until 1975 due to the fact that the NZR design staff were preoccupied with design of wagons and the reconstruction of the Northerner express. The first order for 56 FM vans was approved by the last Cabinet meeting of the Rowling Labour Government on 18 November 1975 for $4.32 million.

The vans were built by Mitsubishi and were the first all-steel vans. The body was composed of three modules that could be detached from the underframe: a central module, classed GM (guard's module), which contained the guard's office, five first-class seats and facilities; and two outer modules, classed LM (luggage module), for freight and luggage. The idea was that, should a module become damaged in service it can be removed for repairs and replaced with another, allowing the van to return to service sooner than otherwise would have been the case. It was because of these modules that the vans were given the FM classification, as opposed to the traditional F designation given to all previous NZR guards vans. The FM also pioneered the X28020 bogie, now used under New Zealand's long-distance passenger fleet. The first batch was very well received by the guards. Fifty-six were built, and in 1976 an order was placed for an additional 17.

=== Second batch, 1981 ===
In 1981, another batch of 50 vans was introduced, built by Daewoo in South Korea. Consideration was even given to using stainless steel bodies on the second batch, but the cost was considered impossible after the acceptance of treated anti-corrosion lower-grade steel for the New Zealand EM class electric multiple units.

In April 1983 the newly formed New Zealand Railways Corporation commissioned consultants Booz Allen Hamilton to review operations with a view to making the Corporation's services more efficient. They reported back in May 1984. Their conclusion was that the extra train weight, crewing and loss of revenue space on trains induced by the vans made the continued use of the guard's vans uneconomic, and they should be withdrawn from freight trains. Among recommendations was reducing locomotive crews from two to one, and the replacement of guards and vans with Train End Monitors (TEMs).

Similar views on the obsolescence and extra cost of NZR use and order of guards van were made in a Railway Gazette International editorial at the time of the order. The editorial expressed the view it was an outrage these extravagant vans were being ordered so one man could ride around the country at the time secondary passenger services were being eliminated in New Zealand on a scale virtually unparalleled in the western world. This latter recommendation led to the elimination of guards vans from all freight trains by 1987 (the last train with a van ran on 30 May 1987.) Consequently, the second batch of FM vans was redundant after only five years in service.

== AG class vans ==
NZR began overhauling a small number of FM vans for use with 56ft carriages on the Blue Fern, Northerner and Overlander, Bay Express and Lynx Express, many rebuilt with air conditioning. These vans were fitted with either a small platform-mounted generator to supply 240 V power or a larger generator in one of the LM modules to supply the 240 V and also power for the air conditioning. On newer, higher-powered vans, one of the end platforms was given more substantial railings and gates for passenger use, and to separate the modified vans from the other FMs they were given the classification AG. Further conversions were performed, with most getting the larger generator, and they soon became the new standard luggage van. There was some variation between vans in the type, size and position of the generator.

In 1991, AG124 was modified with one of the LM modules converted to provide greater outdoor accommodation for passengers, and both ends were fitted with better railings. This van was for use on the TranzAlpine, where it proved extremely popular, and a few years later AG239, with a 110 kVA generator for air-conditioned cars, incorporated the same feature. In 1995, AG239 had the other LM module modified to match, at the expense of any luggage-carrying capacity, and a larger 175 kVA generator to reflect the increased work needed for the larger consist.

In 1998, AG90, out of service since its involvement in the 25 August 1993 level crossing collision between the Southerner and a concrete mixer truck at Rolleston, was repaired and had a new 175 kVA generator installed, for use on the TranzAlpine. This van is used in the middle of the train to separate the increasingly lengthy TranzAlpine into two self-contained sections. In 1999, AG 199 was modified in a similar manner for the TranzCoastal, with one LM and the GM hollowed out for outdoor viewing, and the other LM retained solely for luggage, with no generator. In 2008, AG 239 was modified to match AG 90 to provide a spare viewing car. No further vans have been modified in this manner.

== 21st century ==
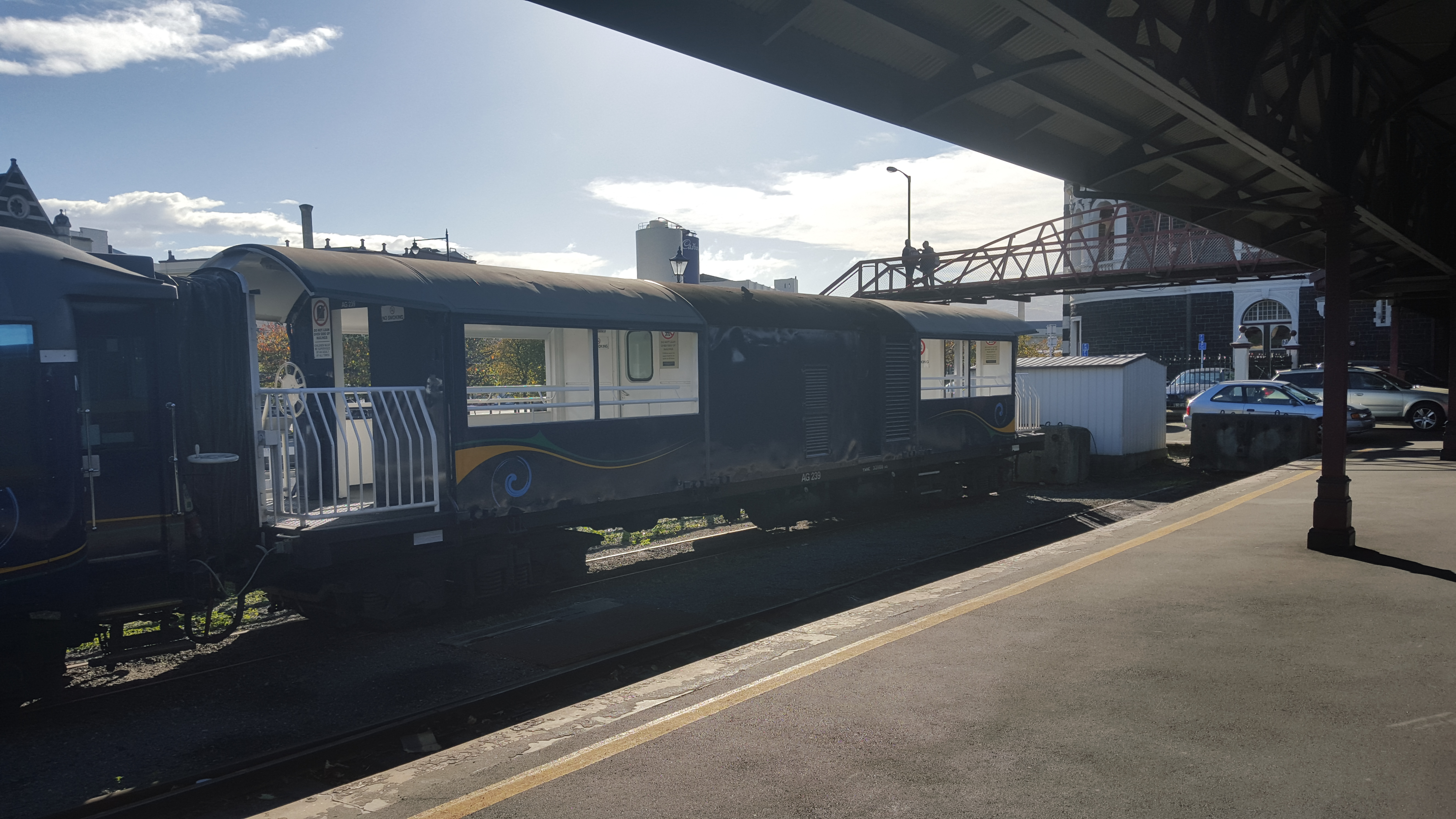
Dunedin Railways FM class observation van at Dunedin Railway Station, 20 May 2016.

AG130 was modified for use with the S class carriages rebuilt from ex-British Rail Mark II carriages for the Capital Connection. Changes included fitting a wheelchair hoist in one of the LM modules and the covering of one of the balcony ends to replace luggage capacity lost by fitting the hoist.

Other vans were used with the first SA suburban sets for Auckland, to supply power before the arrival of SD carriages fitted with a generator and a driving cab, in Auckland Transport Blue with a gold stripe. After the arrival of the SD cars they were released back into the general pool, with two exceptions: AG 222 was further overhauled and painted as a spare generator and extra luggage capacity for Metlink's Wairarapa Connection trains; AG 118 moved to Dunedin with 13 ex-Wairarapa 56 ft carriages, leased to the Dunedin Railways minus bogies. It has been fitted with X25330 bogies and is used to supply head-end power to the cars.

Seven vans have been rebuilt at Hillside Workshops for use with new AK class carriages: AG55, AG61, AG101 and A 216 as AKV viewing/generator vans AKV39, AKV26, AKV13 and AKV41, with a 220 kVA generator, a viewing deck and an interconnecting corridor past the generator compartment; AG78, AG124 and AG245 (ex FM186) as AKL luggage vans AKL34, AKL21 and AKL19, retaining their X28020 bogies (not upgraded to the newer P13 bogies). In 2017, it was announced AGs 147 and 199 were chosen to be converted to AKV open-air viewing/generator vans.

A number of the vans have ended up in service for KiwiRail's non-revenue fleet, for example, Research Test Car EA7501, EBC27 for the ballast cleaning support vehicles, ECL58 for the concrete sleeper layer train, and ETR17 as the radio test vehicle.

== In preservation ==
A considerable number of FM vans were bought by heritage railways. At least three FMs have been returned to mainline use in largely original form, with more expected in the near future. In addition, the Gisborne City Vintage Railway has two vans substantially modified to passenger carriages for mainline use. The three modules have been welded together to form a single body with passenger windows. Two similar vans were similarly converted for the Wairoa YMCA for envisaged passenger trains to their Opoutama camp. This project did not come to fruition. One of these vans has ended up with Gisborne City Vintage Railway and the other with Mainline Steam, where it has been fitted with a servery.

Mainline Steam also has a number of other FM vans to be used with its carriage fleet. One of these vans, at Plimmerton, has been modified with one of the LM modules converted to a viewing platform similar to the Tranz Scenic conversions. The GM module has been partitioned to accommodate a generator and a locomotive crew compartment, and the other LM left for luggage. Unlike the Tranz Scenic conversions, a corridor is provided for so that the van can be marshalled anywhere in the consist and allow passenger access through the train (an idea which has been borrowed for the new vans to go with the AK class carriages.) This van is to be paired with Mainline Steam's British Rail Mark II carriage set.

== See also ==
- Guard's van
