= Bay Express =

Former passenger train service of New Zealand

The Bay Express
Overview
- Service type: Inter-city rail
- Status: operating
- Locale: North Island, New Zealand
- Predecessor: Napier Express Endeavour (train)
- First service: 11 December 1989
- Last service: 7 October 2001
- Current operator: Great Journeys New Zealand
- Former operators: New Zealand Railways Department (NZR) (1970–1987); InterCity Rail (1987–1995); Tranz Scenic (1995–2001)

Route
- Termini: Wellington; Napier
- Distance travelled: 316.97 km
- Average journey time: 5 hours 22 minutes
- Lines used: North Island Main Trunk Line and Palmerston North - Gisborne Line

Technical
- Track gauge: 1,067 mm (3 ft 6 in)

The Bay Express was a passenger train between Wellington and Napier in New Zealand's North Island, operating from Monday, 11 December 1989 until Sunday, 7 October 2001. It was operated by New Zealand Railways Corporation's InterCity Rail division, later known as Tranz Scenic.

== History ==
=== Introduction ===
The Bay Express was preceded by the Endeavour, which ran the same route from 6 November 1972 until 10 November 1989. The Endeavour started service with upgraded carriages and a buffet car. Still, in August 1981, these were diverted to the North Island Main Trunk as the Blue Fern and replaced by carriages of lesser quality without a buffet car. The introduction of the Bay Express was intended to return the standard of Hawke's Bay passenger services back to their former level.

=== Rolling stock ===
The trains consisted of two modular guards vans converted into power-luggage vans with 11 kW petrol generators at the handbrake ends (one from Mitsubishi, Japan, the other from Daewoo, Korea) and three 1930s-built NZR 56-foot carriages, one a former red Picton/Greymouth car extensively rebuilt into a servery and rearview observation car with 24 seats, arranged alcove-style around tables. The seats were Addington Workshops-built and installed in this car for the Picton/Greymouth runs, reupholstered with a slight alteration made to facilitate more comfort on the head and neck. The train included two of three remaining Endeavour cars, each seating 51 in the same seat type and format with large viewing windows like those on the TranzAlpine. The last car of the consist featured a large observation window at the rear. A new form of pressure-ventilation was installed in all three carriages, with associated ceiling-mounted trunking to filter the air throughout each car.

=== Additional rolling stock ===
The train attracted good patronage and, from 1993 onward, the odd Northerner car or two, a thoroughly refurbished Auckland excursion car and later a thoroughly refurbished Wairarapa Connection car, the Auckland excursion modular van with a 37.5-kW generator housed in the non-handbrake end module, the first and third modular NIMT 11-kW power-luggage vans were frequently being used to bolster this service.

From 12 January until 25 January 1993, the first of three 56 foot air-conditioned rear-view cars and the first of three 90-kW power-luggage vans exclusive to the Northerner and Overlander passenger trains were put to use on the Napier train for trial purposes. In the meantime, one of the 51-seat cars exclusive to this train was transferred for trial use on the Southerner.

=== Accident in 1995 ===
On Sunday, 12 November 1995 the Bay Express, consisting of the second Northerner power-luggage van, a Northerner car, a Bay Express car and its servery and rear-view car was involved in a derailment when it entered a 50 km/h marked curve at 90 km/h. The locomotive, DX5310, rolled over and suffered extensive damage, not returning to service until 7 October 2001; and a member of the public riding in the cab suffered injuries that proved fatal the following day. The power-luggage van and Northerner car – which was unoccupied, derailed but remained upright. The Bay Express car and servery car remained on the rails. This resulted in the recently refurbished buffet car, a Northerner car and the first NIMT 90-kW power-luggage van forming a replacement train until Christmas 1995.

=== Re-equipped and refurbished ===
Apart from the servery and rear-view car, the train was fully re-equipped, with two former Picton – Greymouth later TranzAlpine and TranzCoastal panorama cars, the first Southerner power-luggage van with its viewing module restored as a luggage module and the third of three modular vans assigned to the Endeavour. The two panorama cars were completely refurbished, each with 50 seats to a design introduced on the Overlander, and air conditioned. At one end in each car, eight seats were arranged in bays of four, alcove-style, the rest forward-facing. The two "new" power-luggage vans featured 50-kW generators, also housed in the handbrake ends. All were painted in the new Cato blue scheme. The servery and rear-view car was merely inspected for damage and cleared to run with the newer stock, but later incorporated the horizontal full-length 350-mm Tranz Scenic band on the sides in place of the white stripe and yellow band. The dark blue livery remained til 1997.

In 1997, while the refurbished buffet car resumed temporary duties on the run as it had in 1991 and 1993, the servery and rear-view car was refurbished. All seats were reupholstered and the interior decor altered to match the other cars, and the new "Cato blue" paint scheme applied on the exterior.

=== Timetable ===
The timetable had an 8 am departure from Wellington, reaching Napier at 1.30 pm. The return service departed Napier at 2.30 pm and arrived in Wellington at 8 pm. The first service, for invited guests and dignitaries, operated on 10 December 1989 and regular services for the general public commenced the next day.

== Demise ==
Unlike the TranzAlpine and TranzCoastal services, the Bay Express primarily relied upon local point to point traffic and as a result, was placed under increasing pressure by the continued real drop in airline ticket prices over the 1990s, and the price of owning and operating private cars. The travel time of the Bay Express was uncompetitive compared with both air and car travel (five hours thirty minutes on average by rail compared to one hour by air and four hours by car). Long-distance coaches had similar travel times and cheaper fares.

Following significant changes in management within Tranz Rail, a bottom-up review of the business indicated that the Bay Express was not a financially sustainable service. By 2001, roughly 45 passengers were riding the Bay Express per trip, and it was proving to be unprofitable. Subsidies from the central government or other bodies were not forthcoming, and despite protests against cessation and proposals on how to improve ridership, the cancellation of the Bay Express was announced, effective 8 October 2001. West Coast Rail failed to get a subsidy of about $300,000 a year to keep it running, as local government thought Tranz Scenic Services were breaking even.
