= DM class =

DM class or Dm class may refer to:

- New Zealand DM class electric multiple unit
- New Zealand DM class locomotive, diesel-electric locomotives
- WAGR Dm class, 4-6-4T tank locomotives
