= New Zealand DL class locomotive =

Locomotives in New Zealand

New Zealand DL class
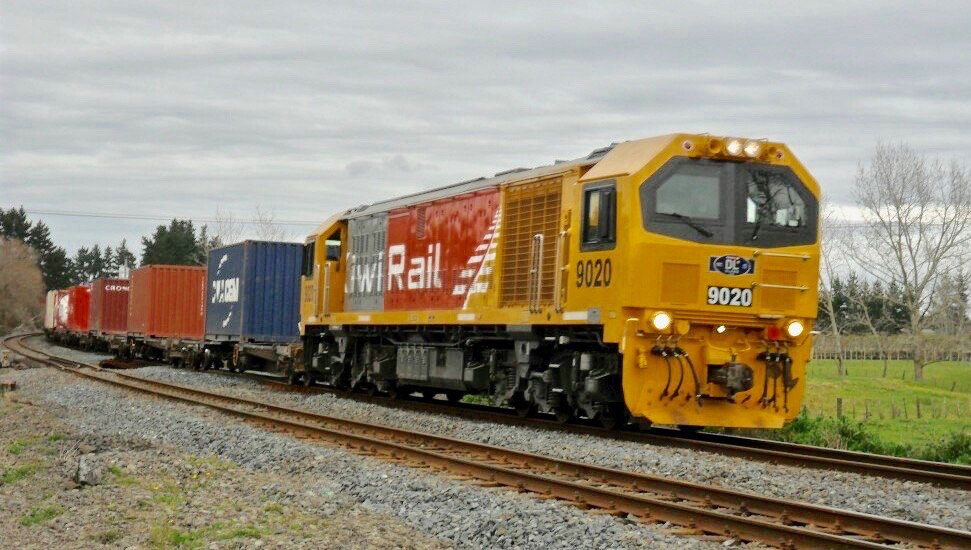
- DL9020 on a freight train near Papakura, Auckland.
Type and origin
- Power type: Diesel-electric
- Builder: CRRC Dalian
- Order number: 73
- Model: CKD-9B
- Build date: first 20: 2009–2011 second 20: 2011–2013 third 8: 2014 fourth 15: 2018 fifth 10: 2023
Specifications
- Configuration
  - UIC: Co-Co
- Gauge: 3 ft 6 in (1,067 mm)
- Length: 18.5 metres (60 ft 8 in) over drawgear 18.12 metres (59 ft 5 in) over body
- Axle load: 18 tonnes (18 long tons; 20 short tons)
- Loco weight: 108 tonnes (106 long tons; 119 short tons)
- Prime mover: MTU 20V 4000R43‡
- Alternator: Yongji Electric Machine Factory JF205 Series
- Traction motors: Yongji Electric Machine Factory ZD126C
- Loco brake: Wabtec 26L Pneumatic Air Brake
Performance figures
- Maximum speed: 80 km/h (50 mph); 100 km/h (62 mph) (passenger units)
- Power output: 2,700 kilowatts (3,600 hp)‡
Career
- Class: DL
- Number in class: 73
- Delivered: November 2010 (1st batch - 6 units); June 2011 (1st batch - 14 units); June 2013 (2nd batch - 10 units); August 2013 (2nd batch - 10 units); April 2015 (3rd batch - 8 units); October 2018 (4th batch - 15 units); April 2023 (5th batch - 10 units)
- First run: 20 November 2010
- Current owner: KiwiRail
- Disposition: In service: 58; Withdrawn: 15

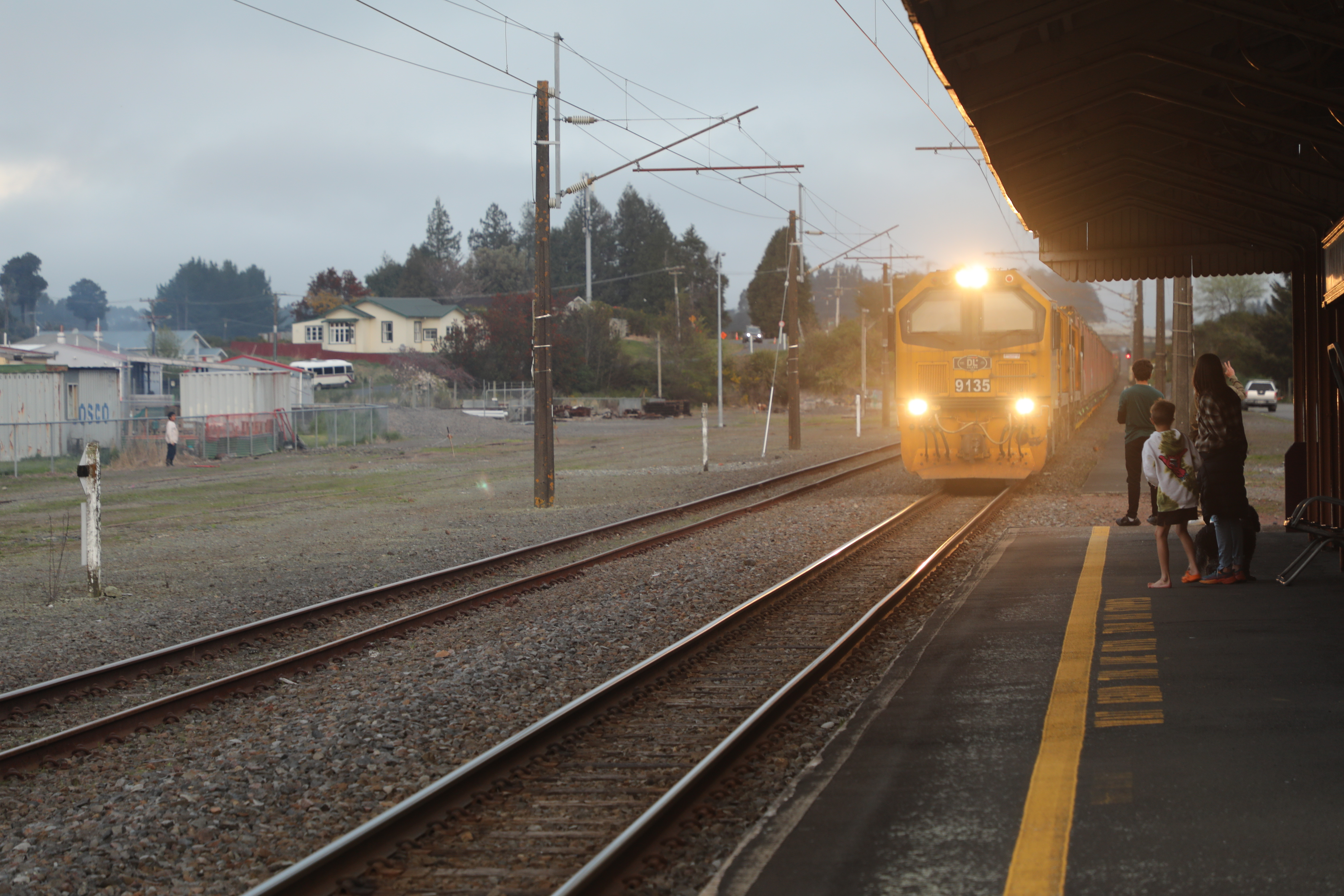
DL9135 hauling train 222 at Ohakune, 20 October 2023

The New Zealand DL class of diesel-electric locomotives was manufactured for KiwiRail by CRRC Dalian with engines from MTU. They were the most powerful diesel-electric locomotives in service in New Zealand until the introduction of the DM locomotives to the South Island in 2025.

In 2009, an order for 20 locomotives was placed (delivered 2010–2011), and a further 20 were ordered in 2011 (for 2012 delivery but postponed to 2013 due to reliability issues). A third batch of eight was ordered in September 2013 (delivered 2015). A fourth order for an additional 15 was placed by KiwiRail in 2016, to replace the EF class electric locomotives on the North Island Main Trunk, but the decision to scrap the electrification was later reversed. A fifth batch of 10 locomotives was ordered in 2020.

The DLs were the first newly built diesel-electric mainline locomotives on New Zealand's rail network since the DF class was introduced in 1979. The order marked one of the first steps of considerable investment in KiwiRail, and the first order for a Chinese-built locomotive from the country.

== Background ==
The acquisition of new locomotives was first proposed by Tranz Rail in 1999, with the potential lease or outright purchase of the Australian National EL class locomotives. The locomotives would have required bogie conversions to fit New Zealand's narrow gauge and smaller loading gauge, and nothing further came from negotiations between Tranz Rail and the locomotives' then owners, Chicago Freight Car Leasing Australia.

In 2002 Tranz Rail engineers investigated the General Motors EMD FT42CU to be classified as the DK class. This locomotive, in essence, would have been a single-cabbed version of the EMD Class 66 locomotive, with the second cab replaced by dynamic brake equipment. Tranz Rail's finances meant it never managed to place an order before Toll NZ purchased Tranz Rail in 2003. The DK class proposal was shelved, with Toll instead working on a different locomotive concept known as the DL class. Toll's DL class was based on building a brand new double-cab clone of the DX class locomotives, using common components from the DX class, such as the same bogies, traction motors, and General Electric 7FDL-12 engine. The locomotives would have a newly manufactured frame and would be built in Toll Rail's own workshops. The DX class was the best and most reliable locomotive in the fleet, and Hutt Workshops already had expertise in the heavy overhaul and rebuild of the DX class locomotives. This DL proposal was also known in its final form as the "Arakaha" locomotive proposal, with the intention for the locomotives to be built at Hillside Workshops.

When Toll assumed responsibility for the rail operation in 2003, the New Zealand Railways Corporation again took over the maintenance of the railway network under the trading name ONTRACK. After several years of negotiations, the two parties could not come to an agreement on the amount that Toll should pay for access to the rail network (track access fees), and Toll did not purchase any new locomotives while this issue remained unresolved. In July 2008, the fifth Labour Government announced the purchase of Toll Rail from Toll, renaming it KiwiRail, and merged it with ONTRACK, creating one company that controlled both rail operations and rail infrastructure. Soon after the new company was officially launched, the State-Owned Enterprises Minister Trevor Mallard announced that the government was investigating the possibility of assembling new locomotives at Hutt Workshops, then operated by United Group Rail, from imported parts and based on the Arakaha concept.

The need for new locomotives by now was pressing, and the Arakaha proposal was dropped as not being able to produce the required locomotives quickly enough. The newly formed KiwiRail board turned its attention to buying new locomotives from established manufacturers, picking up the DK class concept but with components in common with the DX class where practicable and retaining a double-cab. Following a public tender process, Dalian Locomotive and Rolling Stock (CNR Group) was awarded the $75 million contract for new locomotives, with the new locomotive based on the manufacturer's CKD9 model. Following the election of the fifth National government in November 2008, the investment programme initiated by the previous government was suspended pending a review. In March 2009, the government announced that it had authorised KiwiRail to invest $115m in new rolling stock: $75m for 20 locomotives, and $40m for new carriages for Tranz Scenic. While still known as the DK class during the planning stages and upon the order being placed, the DL class name was later chosen to reflect the town where they were built - Dalian in northeast China.

=== Criticism ===
The idea of building the locomotives in New Zealand as advocated by the Labour government was promoted as a way of creating jobs at a time when the economy was entering a recession and unemployment was rising. Critics of the idea pointed out that New Zealand did not possess the necessary skilled labour in sufficient quantity for such a construction program to proceed in a timely manner, and had not done so for several decades since New Zealand Government Railways ceased building its own locomotives - all mainline locomotives since the introduction of diesel traction in the 1950s have been imported. The alternative of importing locomotives from China was billed as the quickest way to obtain the necessary new motive power, a backlog of orders on United States and Australian manufacturers meant that it would take "many years" before the locomotives entered service. A review also found that locally built locomotives would be some 70% more expensive than purchasing from CNR.

Critics questioned the reliability of the locomotives, citing Dalian-built locomotives in Malaysia encountering a number of initial technical problems (see KTM Class 29), although it was claimed that these problems were a product of a lack of maintenance.

Upon delivery, the Rail & Maritime Transport Union raised concerns over cab visibility and the locomotive's weight. KiwiRail subsequently confirmed that the locomotive weighed 105t and that the cab meets United States standards, which are the same as those used in a number of other countries. They also pointed out that the design reflected the need for the cab to be as strong as possible. The union was involved with the design of the cab, and Union representatives were sent to China to check up on the building process and sign off on the locomotive before they were shipped to New Zealand.

== Design ==
The DL class are visually similar to the electric EF class locomotives used on the North Island Main Trunk line, being of similar dimensions and both twin-cab designs. The twin-cab design also provides operational flexibility as locomotives no longer need to be turned or operated in multiple when working terminating lines. They are the second class of twin-cab diesel locomotives to operate on the New Zealand network, the first being the 1950s-era DF class.

The locomotives use a 2.7MW German-built MTU Friedrichshafen 20V 4000R43 engine, expected to have 5–10% increased fuel efficiency over other locomotives, Wabtec braking equipment, and ZD126C traction motors. The cab layout incorporates design elements from British Rail Class 60 with a near-central pedestal controller. They also have the same Co-Co wheel arrangement as the DF and DX classes, as opposed to the Bo-Bo-Bo layout of the EFs.

== Service ==
=== Introduction and tests ===
The first six arrived at Mount Maunganui on 20 November 2010, and were moved to Te Rapa, Hamilton three days later for commissioning and driver training. A ceremony to mark commissioning was held at Te Rapa on 10 December, attended by many KiwiRail staff, including CEO Jim Quinn. Guests included Prime Minister John Key and Minister of Transport Steven Joyce. CNR officials were also present, with the chairman of CNR Cui Diangao explaining to the media that this was the first time Chinese locomotives had been exported to a developed country.

The first six were used for driver training and rail system compliance testing, and the NZ Transport Agency gave the locomotives certification for New Zealand in May 2011.

The remaining 14 of the first batch had been manufactured by April 2011, and were shipped by the Tasman Trader, arriving in Auckland in June 2011. They were then towed to Te Rapa by two of the earlier arrivals.

=== Second batch ===
A further 20 units were ordered in June 2011. and first rolled off the production line on 13 March 2013, incorporating changes based on experience with the first batch. CNR Dalian says they are achieving significantly higher levels of reliability than specified in the contract. Ten locomotives of the second batch arrived on 19 June 2013, and a further 10 on 8 August 2013.

=== Third batch ===
A third batch of eight locomotives was ordered in September 2013. This batch arrived on 15 March 2015.

=== Fourth batch ===
In July 2016, it was announced that KiwiRail had put an order for 15 more DL locomotives. They arrived in early to mid-October 2018, and were towed to Hamilton on 12 October.

=== Fifth batch ===
In June 2020, KiwiRail announced that it would purchase a further 10 DL class locomotives. Todd Moyle, KiwiRail's Chief Operating Officer, implied that having a standardised fleet would lead to cost savings for KiwiRail.

== Operations ==
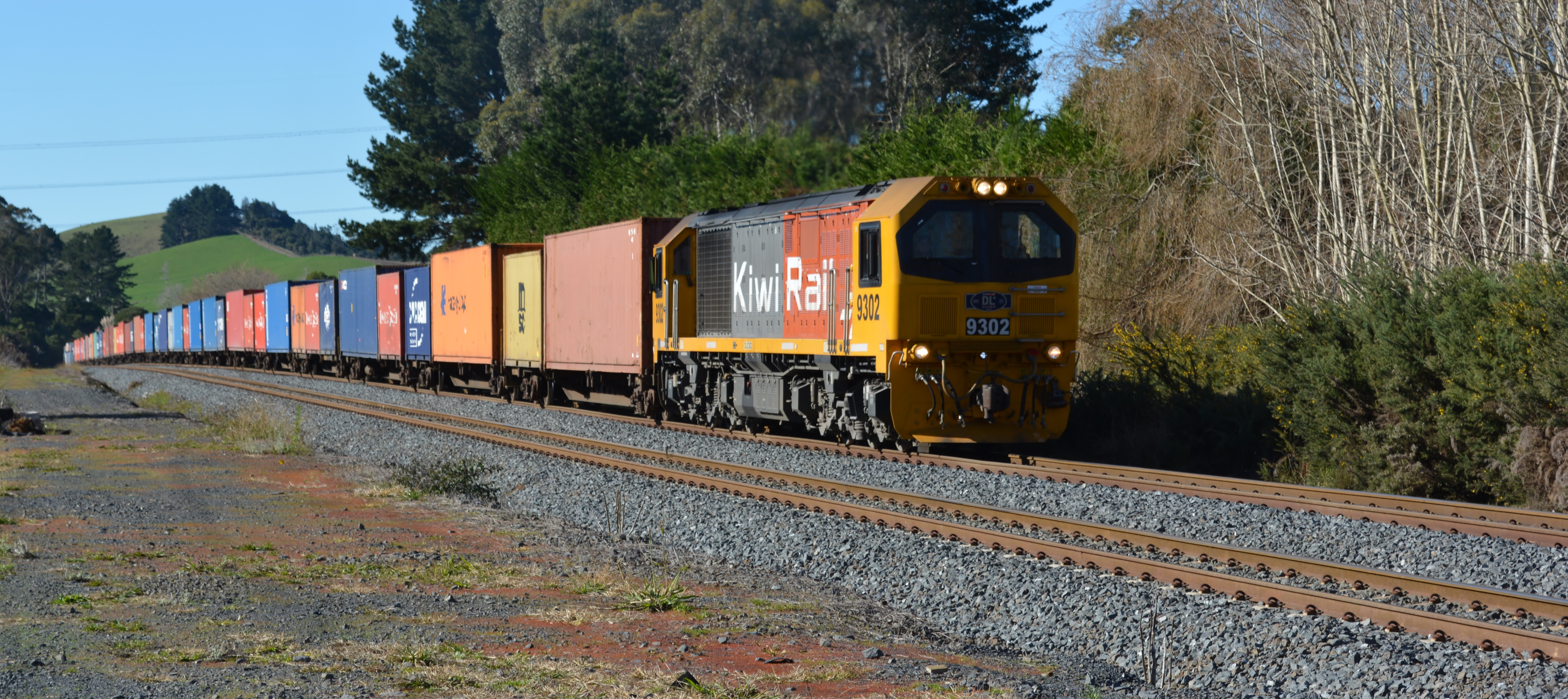
DL9302 hauling a freight train between Pokeno and Tuakau, 4 June 2014.

The locomotives were initially deployed into service on the upper North Island Main Trunk, the East Coast Main Trunk and the Mission Bush, Kinleith, Murupara and Mount Maunganui branches, operating both KiwiRail general freight services and service operated by KiwiRail on behalf of the Port of Tauranga's MetroPort operation. In some cases, these replaced services previously operated by two locomotives in multiple, also eliminating the need to turn the locomotives, though it has been noted that they are regularly turned anyway.

In 2012 KiwiRail undertook testing of a DL locomotive along the lower North Island main and branch lines. Following the introduction of the second batch DL locomotives were introduced to operations along the Marton - New Plymouth Line - including the milk trains to Fonterra's Whareroa complex near Hāwera - and the Palmerston North - Gisborne Line, the latter as far as the current operating terminus in Napier.

The introduction of the DL class has allowed KiwiRail to transfer all of the DX class locomotives to the South Island. The DX class are due to be replaced by June 2027, by the DM class.

=== Commissioning issues ===
The DL class initially had poor reliability, with availability only 50% of that of the rest of the fleet. In one instance, a weld on an alternator fan failed, resulting in the blade breaking off. As a result, KiwiRail employees were told not to enter the alternator compartment and to keep doors to the area closed when the engine is running. The locomotives also experienced technical problems with a wide variety of internal components. KiwiRail stated that the teething problems were normal on new locomotives and that reliability was improving. The Rail & Maritime Transport Union claimed that the problems were beyond those usually experienced with new locomotives.

As a consequence of the problems experienced, production of the second batch of units was put on hold in mid-2012 pending resolution of the design issues. On 31 July 2012, KiwiRail announced that in that month the fleet achieved its highest mean distance between failures (MDBF) rating, outperforming the DX class locomotives by 3000 km. However, the average MDBF performance remained below that of the DX, DF and DC class locomotives until sometime around 2020.

==== Asbestos ====
In February 2014, all 40 DLs were taken out of service for tests after samples from one locomotive tested positive for asbestos in a resin used for sound-proofing. In March 2014 KiwiRail reported that tests had shown small (5%) amounts of white asbestos in a soundproofing compound in five locomotives, with no asbestos in the remaining 34, and with no airborne asbestos or asbestos dust found. It was reported that the risk of exposure to airborne asbestos fibres was minimal, and if any exposure had occurred, it would have been to an insignificant level. An asbestos removal plan was instigated and the first locomotive was returned to service in April 2014. The second generation locomotives were to be returned to service during April 2014, and were expected to have all asbestos removed over the following 12 months; the first generation units were to remain out of service until all asbestos containing materials were removed.

=== North Auckland Line ===
In 2022, KiwiRail undertook tests of the DL class on the North Auckland Line. In October 2022 two DL class locomotives traveled from Westfield in Auckland to the Makarau Tunnel for clearance testing. The locomotives were able to clear the tunnel. In November, DL9642 travelled from Auckland to Whangarei with bridge inspectors, testing bridge piles on the route. The Linesider magazine stated in its December 2022 edition that DL operation on the North Auckland Line is "likely to begin later this year."

=== ETCS and bogie improvements ===
Some DL class locomotives have been equipped with European Train Control System (ETCS) signalling equipment for use in the Auckland and Waikato regions hauling passenger trains. In February 2026, DL9763 was tested hauling the Te Huia Hamilton-Auckland service at speeds greater than the regular 80km/h. Initial tests found the ride quality "unsatisfactory." Further trials and changes to locomotive bogies proved satisfactory, and a limited number of DL class locomotives were granted running rights to run up to 100km/h in August 2026 for passenger trains. DL class locomotives took over from DFT locomotives on Te Huia and the Northern Explorer in August, with all trains operating in the Auckland metro area being hauled by DLs from 1 September 2026.

== Withdrawals ==
Withdrawals of the locomotives commenced in August 2023, with three first-generation DL class locomotives removed from service and stored at Hutt Workshops. Since then, a total of fifteen first-generation DLs are currently stored at Hutt Workshops.

== See also ==
- KTM Class 29, similar locomotives manufactured by Dalian Locomotive Company
