= New Zealand EF class locomotive =

Class of 22 electric locomotives

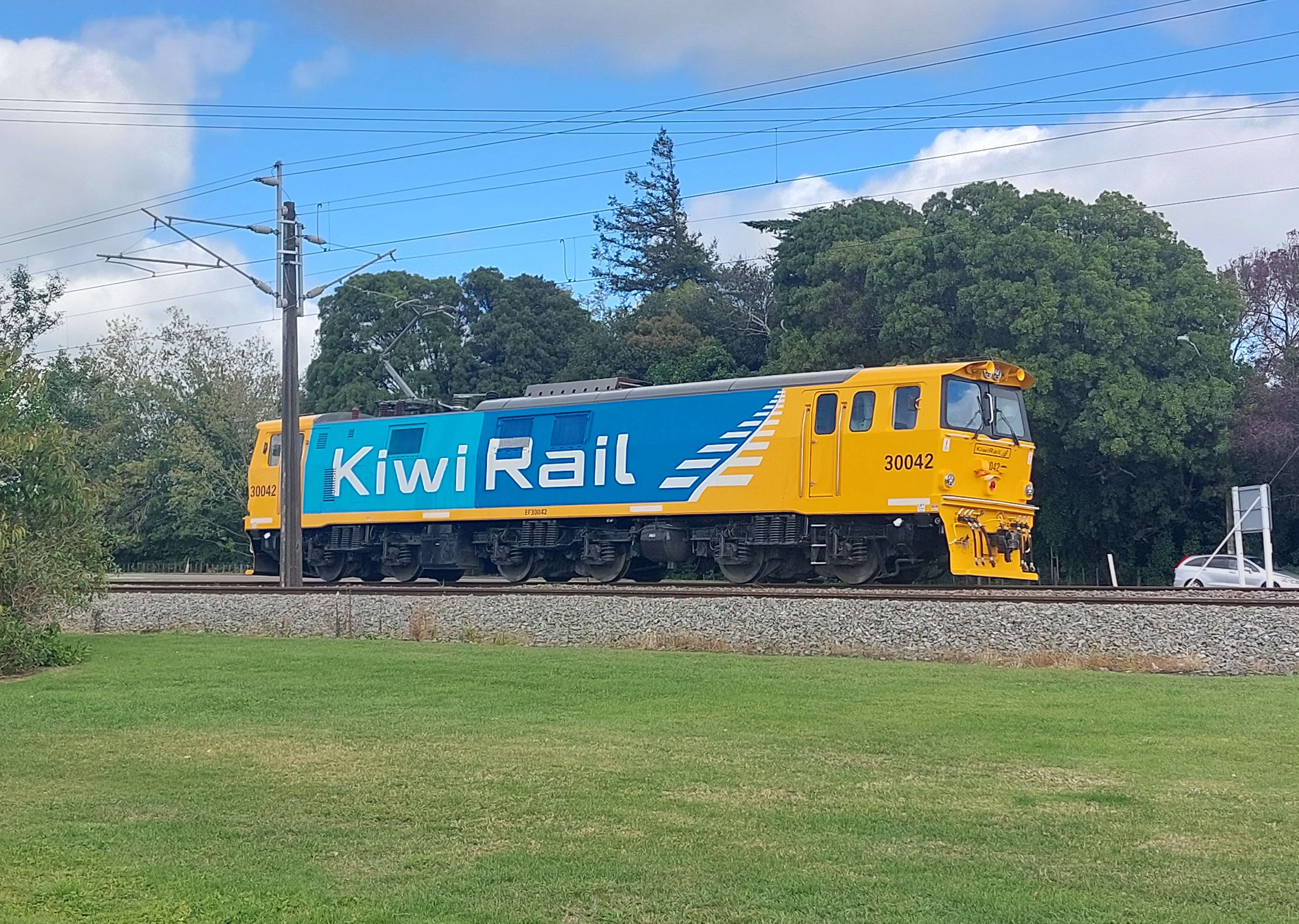
- EF 30042 in an "electric blue" livery in Feilding, following refurbishment
Type and origin
- Power type: Electric
- Builder: Brush Traction, Loughborough, England
- Build date: 1986–1988
Specifications
- Configuration
  - UIC: Bo′Bo′Bo′
- Gauge: 1,067 mm (3 ft 6 in)
- Length
  - Over couplers: 19.61 metres (64 ft 4 in)
  - Over body: 18.56 metres (60 ft 11 in)
- Width: 2.7 metres (8 ft 10 in)
- Height
  - Pantograph: 3.95 metres (13 ft 0 in)
  - Body height: 3.915 metres (12 ft 10.1 in)
- Loco weight: 107 t (105 long tons; 118 short tons)
- Electric system/s: 25 kV 50 Hz AC overhead
- Current pickup: Pantograph
- Traction motors: 6 × 500 kW (670 hp) DC motor
Performance figures
- Maximum speed: 105 km/h (65 mph)
- Power output: 3,000 kW (4,000 hp) (continuous)
Career
- Class: EF, previously Class 30
- Number in class: 22
- Numbers: 30007 – 30249
- Nicknames: Toasters
- Locale: North Island Main Trunk between Palmerston North and Te Rapa
- First run: 24 June 1988 – 17 September 1989
- Disposition: 13 in service; 2 under overhaul; 3 laid up; 4 scrapped

The New Zealand EF class locomotive (originally Class 30) is a class of 25 kV 50 Hz AC electric locomotives that operate on the North Island Main Trunk (NIMT) between Palmerston North and Te Rapa in New Zealand. Built by Brush Traction in Loughborough, England between 1986 and 1988 to run on the new electrified central section of the NIMT, at 3,000 kilowatts (4,000 hp), they are the most powerful locomotives to operate in New Zealand (equalled by the DM class diesel locomotives introduced in 2025).

== Background ==
The NIMT is a 681-kilometre (423 mi) long rail line that links New Zealand's capital Wellington and largest city Auckland, and is one of the major backbones of the country's rail network. The line was completed in 1908 and opened the following year, and included various engineering feats on the central section between Hamilton and Palmerston North, including the Raurimu Spiral and numerous viaducts – five of which are over 70 metres (230 ft) high.

Electrification of the NIMT was first proposed as early as 1918 due to coal shortages during World War I and later was proposed in the 1950s when diesel locomotives started to replace steam. The section between Wellington and Paekakariki was electrified in 1938 at 1500 V DC to prevent steam build-up in the long Tawa tunnels under the Wellington hills and to provide banking on the steep seaside section from Paekakariki up to Pukerua Bay. This electrification has since been extended further north to Paraparaumu on 7 May 1983 and again to Waikanae on 20 February 2011.

Following the oil shocks of the 1970s, the National government, led by Prime Minister Robert Muldoon, launched the "Think Big" energy development projects. One of the projects involved the electrification of the 411-kilometre (255 mi) central section of the NIMT between Palmerston North and Te Rapa, approved in 1980. This section was chosen for the topography of the line between these two cities, and the advantages electric locomotives had over diesel in this area. The 2,050-kilowatt (2,750 hp) DX class diesel-electric locomotives, then the mainstay of the NIMT and only recently introduced themselves, could handle 720-tonne freight trains on the section, but could only average 27 kilometres per hour (17 mph) when climbing the 1 in 52 gradients of the Raurimu Spiral. A more powerful locomotive, in this case, an electric locomotive, could haul a 900-tonne freight train up the same section of track at a speed of 45 kilometres per hour (28 mph). Electric trains also had advantages during the 1970s oil shocks as New Zealand relied on imported oil to supply its diesel locomotives. Meanwhile, New Zealand's electricity supply is mainly generated from renewable hydroelectricity (hydroelectricity generated 84.5% of New Zealand's electricity in 1980), and therefore electric trains do not have to rely on imported oil to operate.

=== Classification ===
Initially, the locomotives were classified as "EAC" in planning documents. During the contracting process, some memorandum referred to the locomotives as E30. When the class began entering service, they were classified as "Class 30." In 1989, this changed again to EF.

== Service ==
=== Introduction ===
The electrification of the central section began in 1984, with the government setting aside NZ$40 million to purchase a fleet of 25 kV 50 Hz AC locomotives to operate the new electrified line. Specifications for the locomotives were released in 1983. The contract to build 22 electric locomotives was awarded to Brush Traction of Loughborough, England in 1984. The first two, numbered 30007 and 30013, arrived on 21 July 1986 and were used in the testing of the new electrification system, while the remaining 20 locomotives were introduced after the electrification of the NIMT was completed.

The locomotives are able to generate a continuous power output of 3,000 kilowatts (4,000 hp), making the class the most powerful to operate on the New Zealand railway network. They also feature the unusual wheel arrangement of Bo-Bo-Bo, which had been previously used on the EW class electric locomotives and the DJ class diesel-electric locomotives. The advantage of using the Bo-Bo-Bo arrangement over the traditional Co-Co arrangement is that it provides greater flexibility for New Zealand's lightly laid and sharply curved tracks, resulting in less wear on the rails.

The locomotives are supplied electricity from 25 kV 50 Hz AC overhead lines. These lines draw electricity from New Zealand's national grid at four locations along the electrified section: Bunnythorpe, Tangiwai, Taumarunui, and Hamilton. The locomotives are fitted with regenerative braking as well as regular air brakes, so the traction motors can be turned into generators when the locomotive is coasting downhill and feed electricity back into the overhead lines and the national grid.

The EF class were nicknamed "Toasters" or "Shoe Boxes" by New Zealand railway enthusiasts due to their boxy shape.

=== In service ===
The EF class were first used to haul freight trains along the central section of the NIMT, with the completion of electrification in 1988. Freight trains travelling from Auckland would be diesel-hauled to Te Rapa, change there to an EF class locomotive and be hauled to Palmerston North where they would be changed back to a diesel locomotive to continue to Wellington. This remains the practice today, although trains that do not traverse the length of the central section (such as pulp trains from Karioi mill) are entirely diesel-hauled to save switching the locomotives. Similarly, freight trains that are destined for or originate from the Marton – New Plymouth Line are diesel-hauled for 30 km section of the NIMT between Palmerston North and Marton.

The locomotives had a number of teething issues when first introduced. After two years in service, two locomotives were withdrawn due to transformer failures, and converters were found to be unreliable and required replacing. The locomotives also suffered from longitudinal oscillation at low speed and required dampers to be fitted. This work was completed under warranty from Brush, after New Zealand Railways withheld the final payment of $44 million to Brush pending a solution to the locomotives' problems. As a result, fleet availability was poor, only 73% in October 1989, well below the target of 90% availability.

The locomotives transformer issues continued, and an upgrade programme was undertaken over 1993 and 1994 which saw the 20 remaining locomotives receive upgraded transformers and overhauled traction motors. This work was undertaken at the Hutt Workshops with EF 30007 the first to be treated after having been out of action for some time prior. Legal disputes between Brush and New Zealand Rail (as it was by then) were settled in the early 1990s.

Prior to the Stratford–Okahukura Line being mothballed usual operating practice was for the services originating from Auckland or Hamilton and Stratford to meet at Taumarunui and exchange trains there, with an EF regularly hauling the Hamilton-Taumarunui-Hamilton legs. With the mothballing of this line most services now run direct between Palmerston North and Te Rapa.

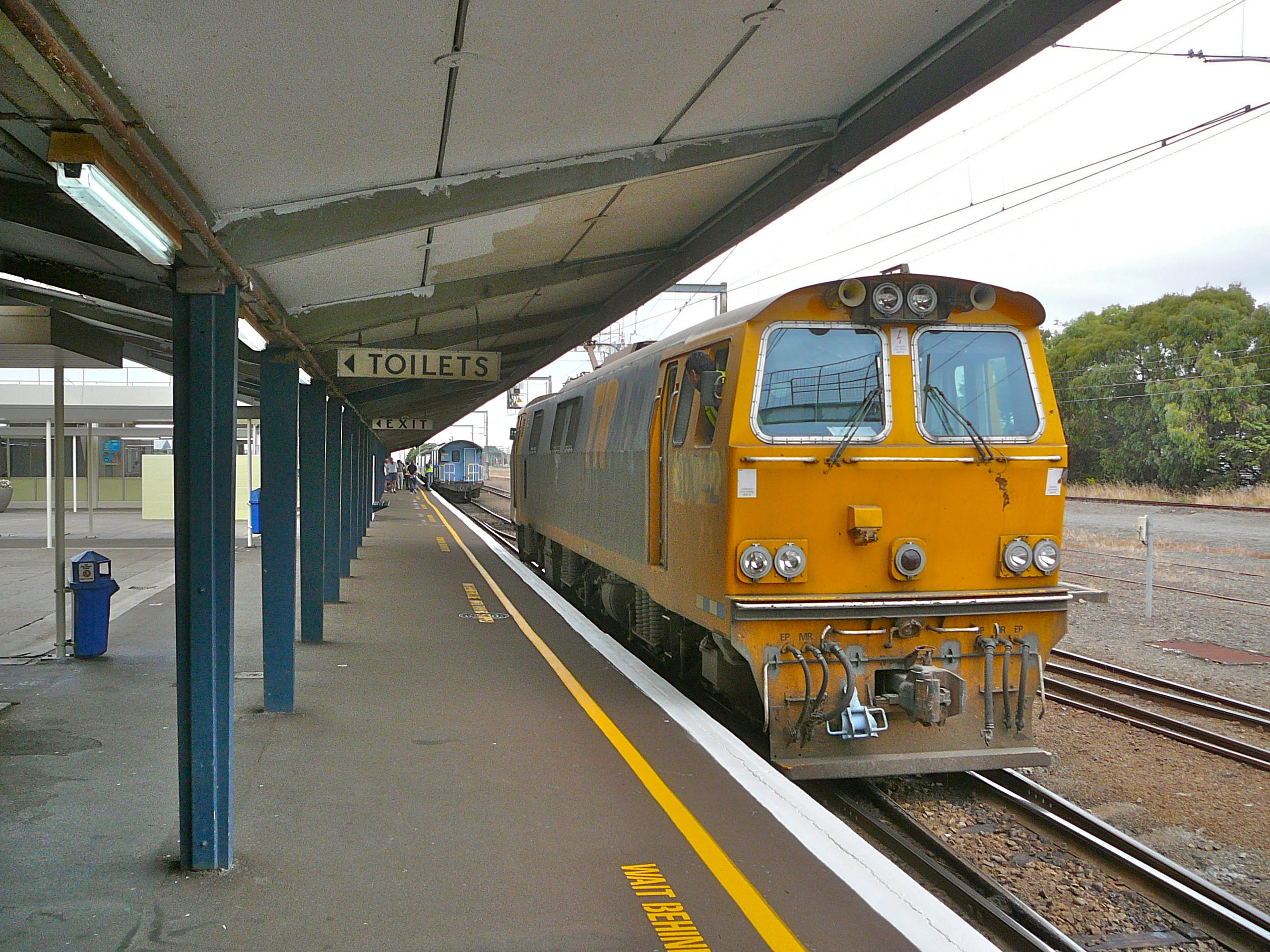
EF 30042 on The Overlander at Palmerston North, on 7 March 2007

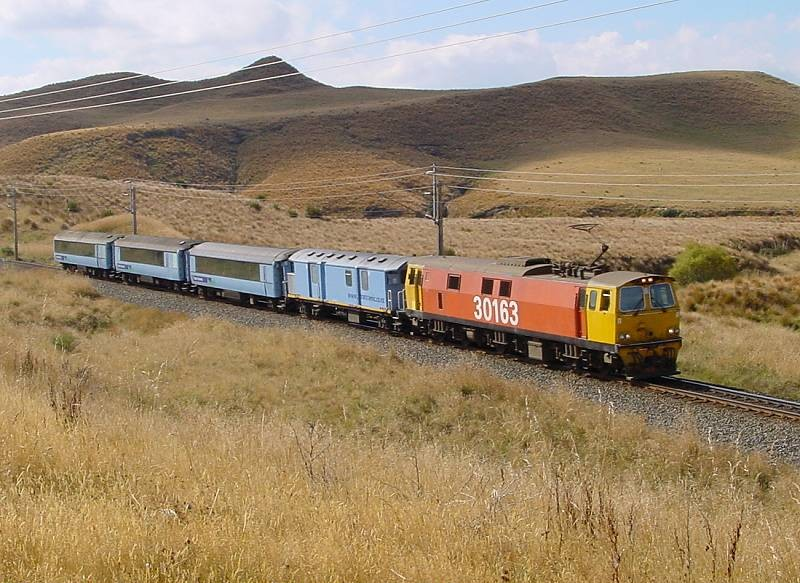
EF 30163 hauling The Overlander near Waiouru on 22 March 2003

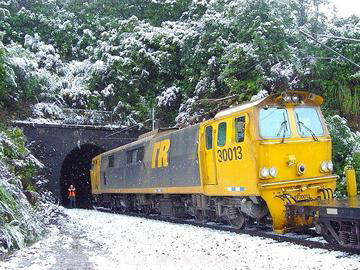
EF 30013 on the NIMT in bumble bee livery on 10 September 2006

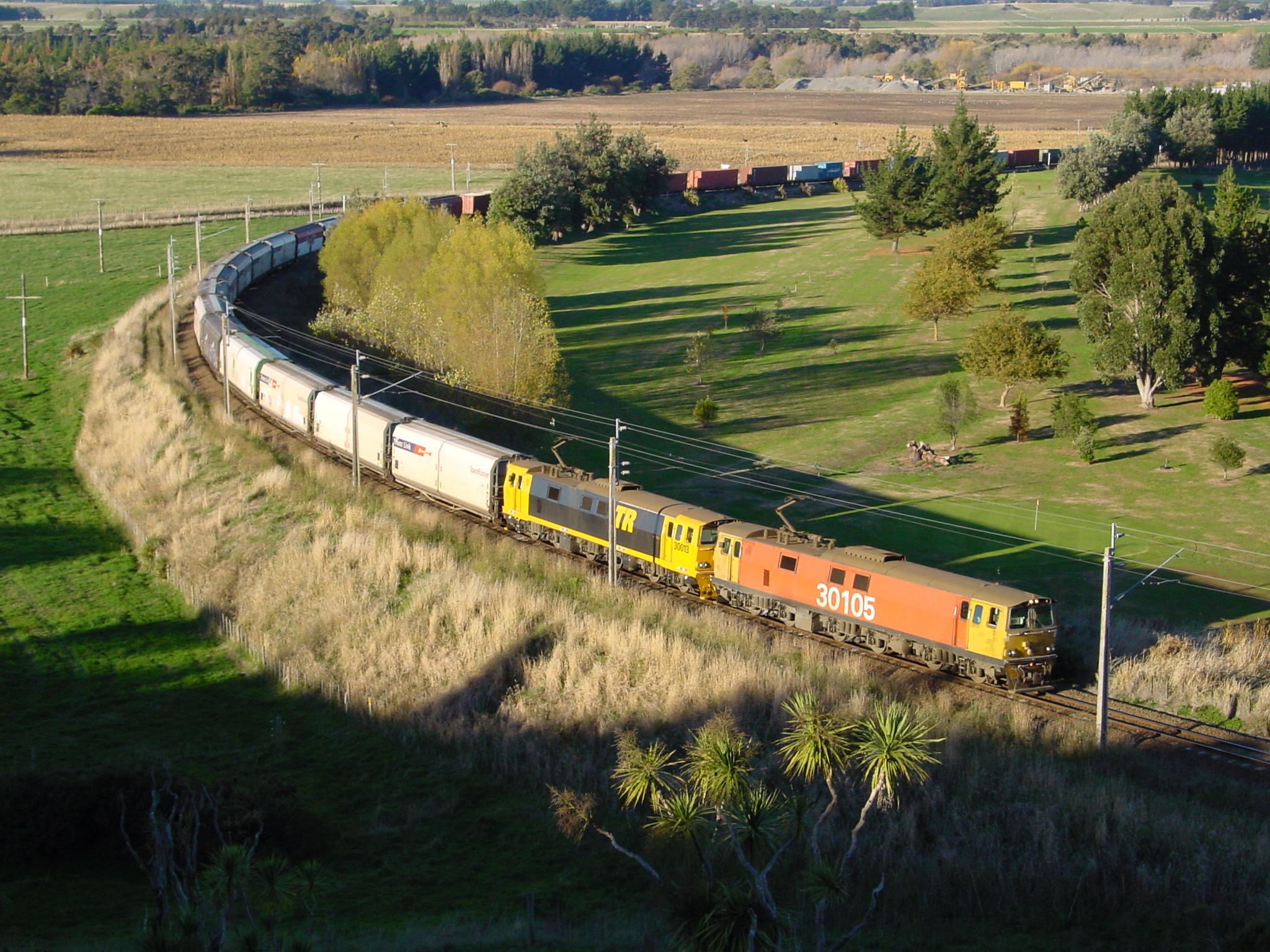
Fruit Salad and Bumble Bee liveried EF class locomotives about to climb the bank on 13 May 2003

Electric-hauled passenger services originated later, due to the then daylight NIMT service, the Silver Fern, utilising diesel-electric railcars. When the locomotive-hauled Overlander daylight service replaced the Silver Fern in December 1991, EF class locomotives began to be used to haul it across the central section, and later, the locomotives were used on the overnight Northerner express passenger service until it was cancelled in November 2004. The EF's were not used initially on the Northern Explorer, KiwiRail experimented for a short while with towing the whole consist – including the diesel locomotive – over the central section. The need for the EF class locomotives for freight services curtailed this.

Despite the NIMT railway electrification and the Auckland railway electrification being built to the same voltage specifications (25kV AC at 50 Hz), the EF class could not be used on Auckland's network due to that network requiring higher fault current tolerances than the NIMT. In order to run on Auckland's network, the EF class would require upgraded rectifiers.

Only heavy repairs are undertaken at the main Hutt Workshops near Wellington which, due to the non-electrified section between Palmerston North and Waikanae (and Wellington's electrification being DC rather than AC), the locomotives must be towed by a diesel engine to access the workshops. All other work is carried out in Palmerston North.

From June 2006, the locomotives have been fitted with AAR couplers, each weighing over 400 kilograms (880 lb), to allow them to pull heavier trains.

In July 2010, EF 30065 and EF 30128 were assessed for a return to service, having been held in open storage (along with EF 30186) for many years at Palmerston North as surplus to operational requirements. It is hoped that reinstating the locomotives will help to ease pressure on the working fleet, especially as locomotives are currently regularly out of service for maintenance, modification and re-branding. EF 30065 was placed on second-hand bogies and moved to Hutt Workshops in August 2010 to begin the assessment, followed by EF 30186 in September 2010. EF 30128 followed to Wellington in April 2011. It is anticipated that one of the locomotives will serve as a parts source to return the other two to service and the remaining hulk scrapped.

All EFs went through a minor upgrade to ensure reliability before a full overhaul is carried out. The upgrade included replacing the obsolete Locolog event recorder and vigilance system with the latest generation system known as Tranzlog. This system also includes fault recording.

EF 30013 was fitted with a replacement air compressor as a trial during 2012, which all locomotives will now receive. The original compressor has become uneconomic to rebuild and is becoming increasingly difficult to keep functioning. These locomotives can be recognised by a new louver being fitted to 2B side of the locomotive.

== Withdrawal and disposal ==
Seven EF class locomotives have been withdrawn from service. EF's 30036 and 30088 were withdrawn from service following a derailment caused by a washout at Oio (north of Raurimu) on 7 August 1991 that also killed the locomotive engineer. After recovery from the site, the two heavily damaged locomotives were stored at Hutt Workshops until the decision was made that it was both uneconomic to repair the units and they would be surplus to existing requirements. Both were scrapped at Hutt Workshops in April 2003 and February 2007 respectively. Usable salvaged parts had been stripped to support the remainder of the fleet. EF 30007 was laid up during the mid-1990's, but it was returned to service not long after that.

EF's 30065, 30128 and 30186 were laid up in late 1990's and were in long-term storage at Palmerston North as surplus to operational requirements. All three were moved to Hutt Workshops in 2010. Two other EF class locomotives were withdrawn – 30111 was withdrawn from service in late 2015 due to requiring an air compressor change, but due to it being surplus at the time KiwiRail used its Bogies for another EF. 30157 was withdrawn from service after catching fire in 2015. Both locomotives are stored in Palmerston North.

In December 2016, it was announced that the EF class locomotives would be withdrawn over a two-year period and replaced by DL class locomotives, with the overhead lines remaining in place should the need for electric traction arise in the future. EF's 30163 and 30249 were removed from service in the first quarter of 2018, and EF's 30128 and 30186 were scrapped at Hutt Workshops in during the weeks of late-July and early-August 2021.

== Reprieve and Overhauls ==
Following the 2017 general election KiwiRail and the new Labour-led Coalition Government announced on 30 October 2018 that capital funding would be made available to refurbish 15 of the locomotives at the Hutt Workshops, extending the service life by 10 years for their continued use on the NIMT electrification in line with the new Government's energy and emissions policies. EF30226 and EF30163 were transferred to the Hutt Workshops via the Wairarapa Line in November 2019 for overhaul by KiwiRail in collaboration with original manufacturer Brush Traction, now a subsidiary of Wabtec. By this stage only eight remained in service.

As at December 2020, work on the first locomotive, EF30226, had commenced at Hutt Workshops. It had been repainted in a new yellow and blue livery and named Tekapo. As of August 2021, the locomotive has had the Tekapo name removed, and the livery is now under wraps. KiwiRail had indicated in a Ministerial Briefing that the overhaul of the 15 EF locomotives should be completed in 2023. The 2022 – 2024 Statement of Corporate Intent (SCI) now has a 2022 target for the first refurbished EF to re-enter service and a 2024 target for the last.

The first overhauled locomotive, EF30163, was presented at Hutt Workshops on 8 June 2022 to the media and Transport Minister Michael Wood. The locomotive is painted in a blue livery prior to being towed and commissioned in Palmerston North. The initial plan was to overhaul 12 of the remaining 15 EF locomotives. KiwiRail's acting CEO stated the company would refurbish as many of the locomotives as its budget would allow.

After extensive testing and ironing out of issues with its control system, EF30163 began hauling revenue services in November 2022.

EF30192, EF30232 and EF30042 had been refurbished an re-entered service by April 2024. The remaining EF locomotives will be upgraded by 2026. With upgrading they can now feed regenerated power back to the grid. An award for the project was made by the Institution of Mechanical Engineers on 24 October 2025.

By late 2025, EFs 30163, 30226, 30192, 30232, 30042, 30059, 30094, 30071, 30134, and 30013 had been overhauled and were back in service. Meanwhile, 30105 and 30203 were undergoing commissioning and fixes; 30007 was close to being released from the Hutt Workshops; and 30140 and 30249 were still under overhaul. This accounts for the 15 intended to be refurbished.

== Outside New Zealand ==
The EF class design was used as the basis for the Eurotunnel Class 9 locomotives used in the Channel Tunnel by the Eurotunnel Shuttle service that was also built by Brush Traction and was scaled up to the standard rail gauge and larger loading gauge used in Europe.
