= DXC =

DXC may refer to:

- DXC Technology, a US-based company
- A subclass of the New Zealand DX class locomotive
