= Peristerona, Famagusta =

Peristerona: Περιστερώνα (Greek); Alaniçi (Turkish)
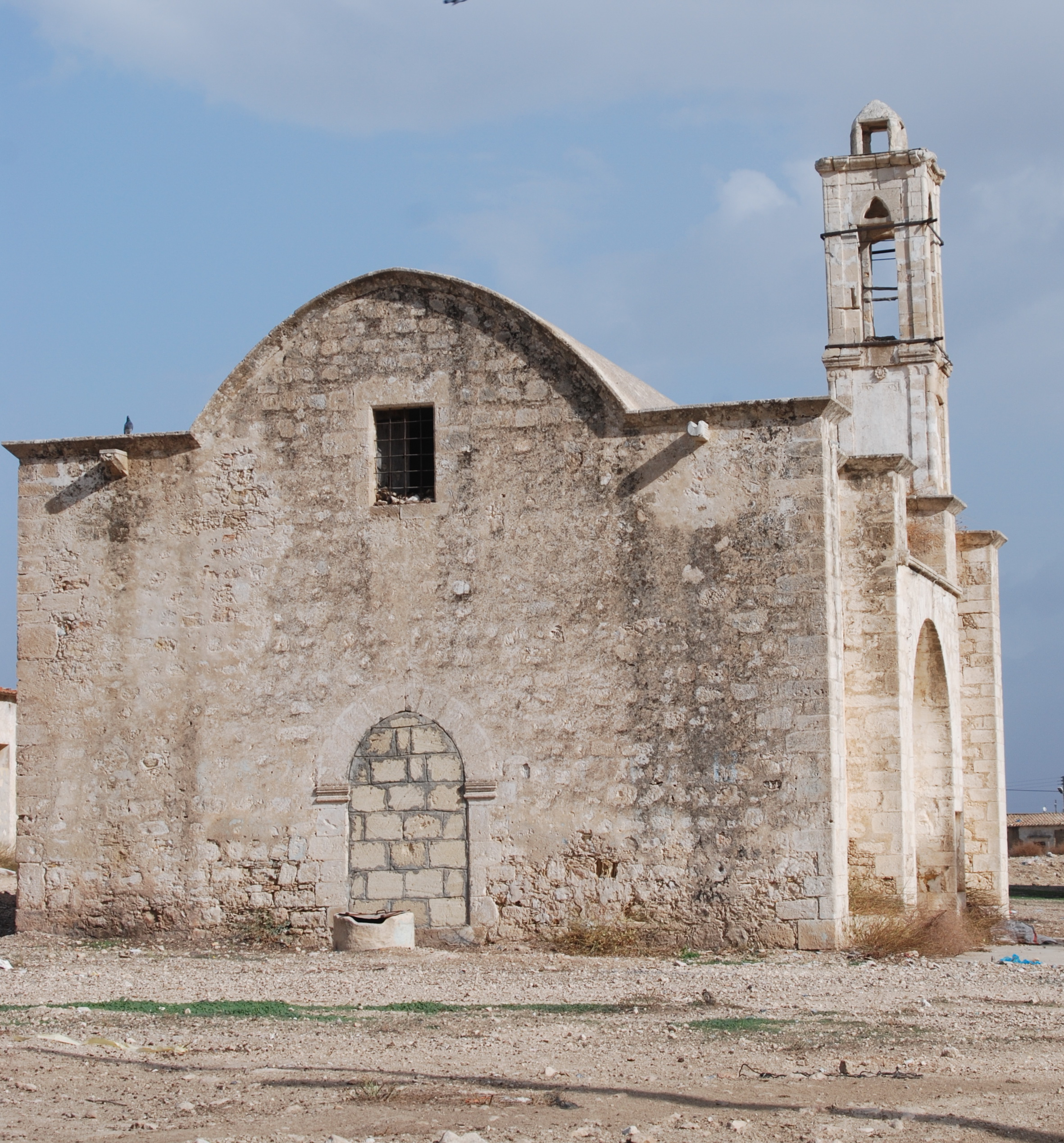
- The church in Peristerona

- Location within Cyprus
- Coordinates: 35°12′56″N 33°45′33″E
- Country (de jure): Cyprus
  - District: Famagusta District
- Country (de facto): Northern Cyprus
  - District: Gazimağusa District

Peristerona (Greek: Περιστερώνα; Turkish: Alaniçi) is a village located in the Famagusta District of Cyprus, 6 km (3.7 mi) south of Lefkoniko, in the Mesaoria plain. The name means "pigeon nest". Peristeronona is under the de facto control of Northern Cyprus. According to Northern Cyprus, Peristerona is part of Peristeronopigi.
