= Pigi, Famagusta =

Peristeronopigi: Πηγή (Greek); Alaniçi (Turkish)
- Location within Cyprus
- Coordinates: 35°13′27″N 33°45′37″E
- Country (de jure): Cyprus
  - District: Famagusta District
- Country (de facto): Northern Cyprus
  - District: Gazimağusa District

Pigi (Greek: Πηγή; Turkish: Alaniçi) is a village located in the Famagusta District of Cyprus, 6 km (3.7 mi) south of Lefkoniko, in the Mesaoria plain. The name means "water well". Pigi is under the de facto control of Northern Cyprus. According to Northern Cyprus, Pigi is part of Peristeronopigi.
