= Traxtion =

South African railway company

- Type: Private company
- Industry: Rail transport in South Africa
- Products: Rail freight transport services

Traxtion Pty Ltd is a private railway operator based in South Africa.

== Rolling stock investment ==
In 2025, the company announced a $199m investment in rolling stock as part of the reform of Rail transport in South Africa, where the South African government allowed private operators to run trains on Transnet Freight Rails network.

Traxion has purchased 46 of the KiwiRail DX class locomotives.
