= Peristeronopigi =

Peristeronopigi: Περιστερωνοπηγή (Greek); Alaniçi (Turkish)
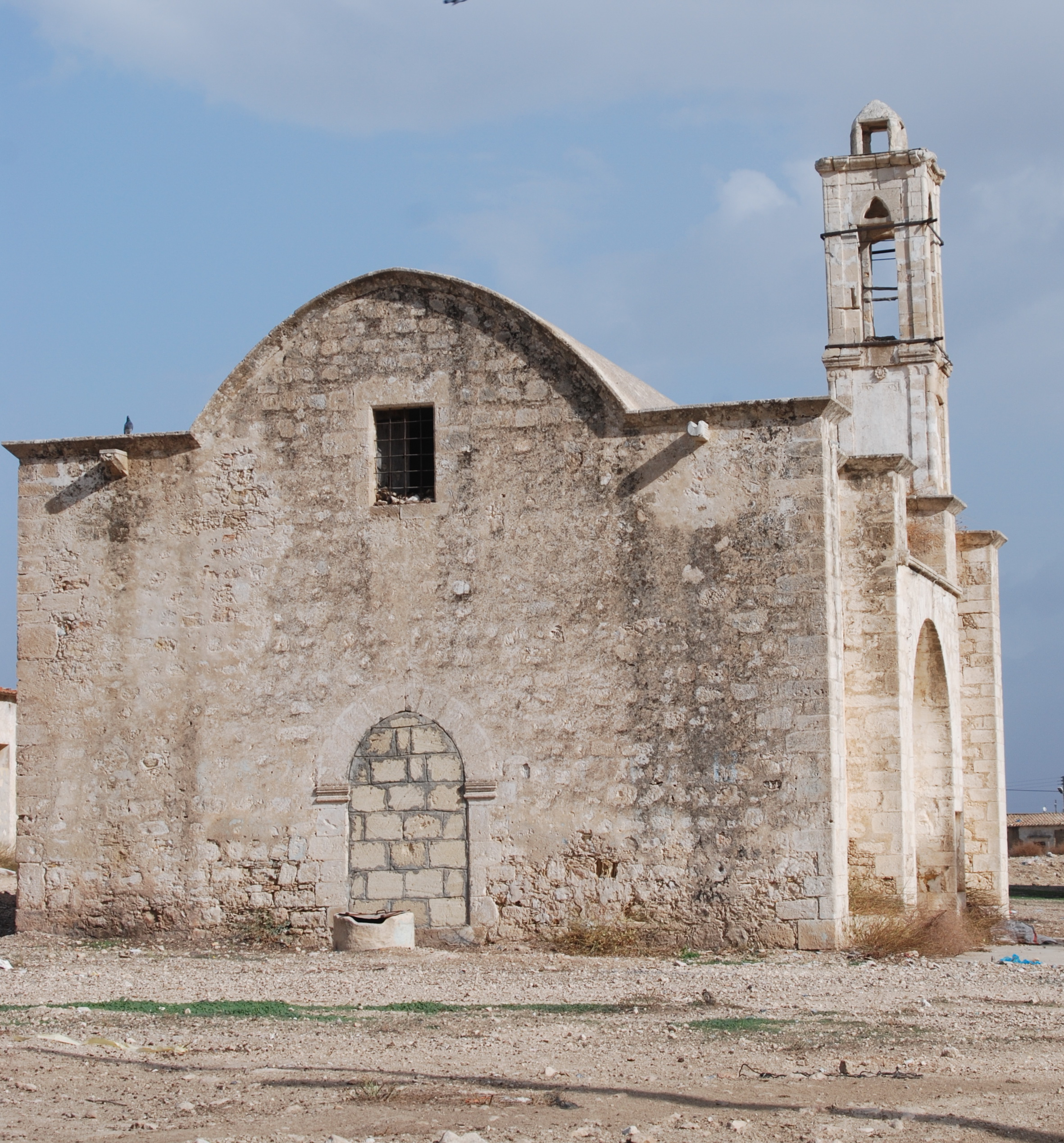
- The church in Peristeronopigi

- Location within Cyprus
- Coordinates: 35°13′13″N 33°45′36″E
- Country (de jure): Cyprus
  - District: Famagusta District
- Country (de facto): Northern Cyprus
  - District: Famagusta District

Population (2011)
  - Total: 860

Peristeronopigi or Pigi–Peristerona (Greek: Περιστερωνοπηγή; Turkish: Alaniçi) is a village located in the Famagusta District of Cyprus, 6 km (3.7 mi) south of Lefkoniko, in the Mesaoria plain. Historically, Peristeronopigi consisted of two continuous villages: Peristerona (meaning "pigeon nest") in the south and Pigi ("water well") in the north. Peristeronopigi is under the de facto control of Northern Cyprus. As of 2011, it had a population of 860.

== History ==
The village was recorded as early as the early 13th century in papal documents.

Peristeronopigi was a mixed village until 1958. Due to intercommunal strife, all of the approximately 200 Turkish Cypriots were displaced from the village in 1958 and took refuge in Maratha and the town of Famagusta. The second displacement took place in 1974, when all the Greek Cypriots (around 1,700) from Peristeronopigi fled from the advancing Turkish army. In 1975, Turkish Cypriots from Klavdia (Turkish: Alaniçi) settled in Peristeronopigi illegally.

== Notable people ==
- Ephraim of Vatopedi (born 1956), Abbot of Vatopedi
