= KTM Class 29 =

Class of Chinese diesel electric locomotives

Class 29
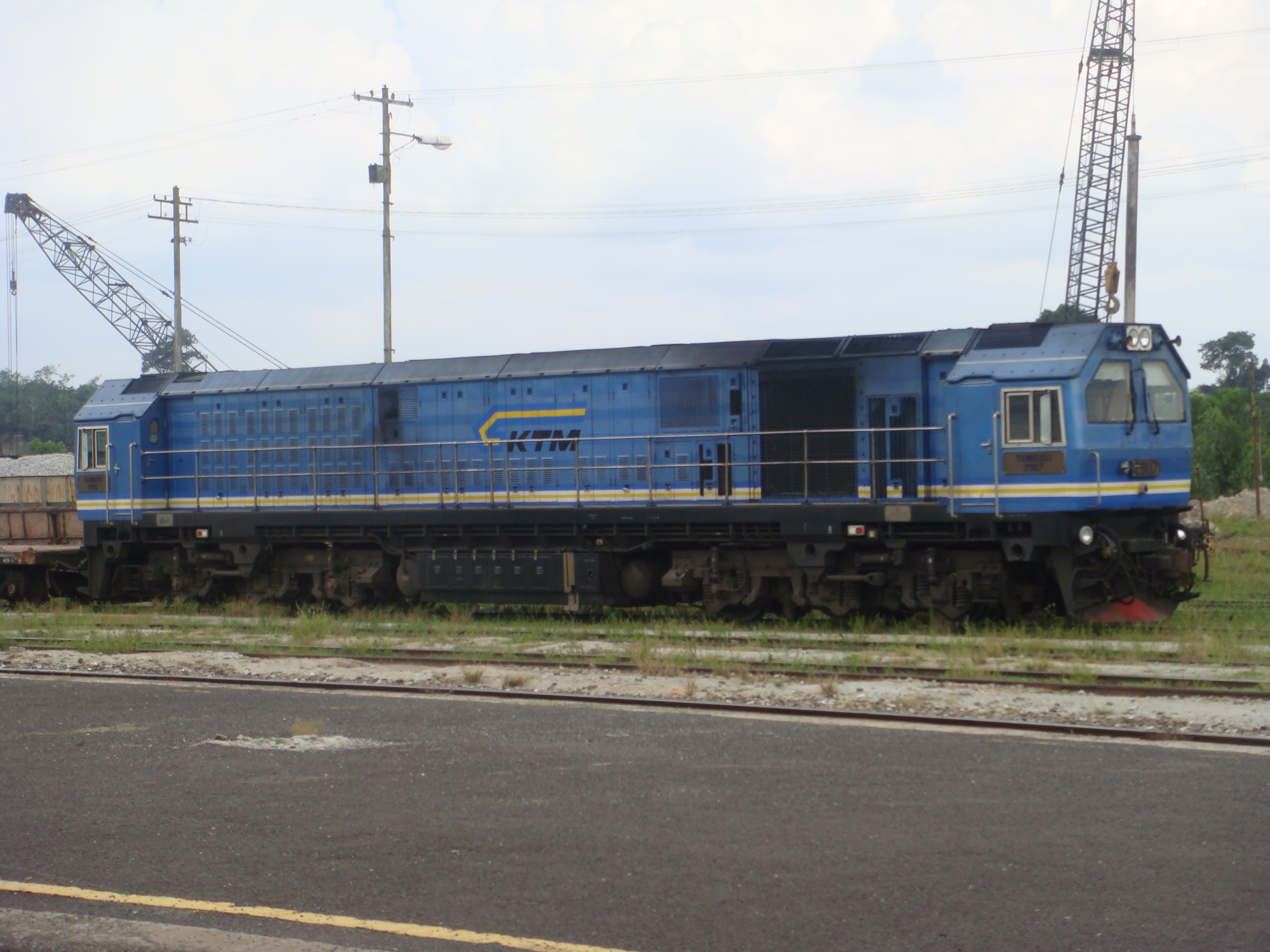
Type and origin
- Power type: Diesel-electric
- Builder: Dalian Locomotive and Rolling Stock (CNR Group)
- Model: CKD8E
- Build date: 2005
- Total produced: 20
Specifications
- Configuration
  - UIC: Co-Co
- Gauge: 1 000 mm (3 ft 3 3/8 in)
- Wheel diameter: 965 mm (3 ft 2.0 in)
- Length: 20,668 mm (67 ft 9.7 in)
- Width: 2,800 mm (9 ft 2 in)
- Height: 3,875 mm (12 ft 8.6 in)
- Loco weight: 120 tons
- Fuel type: Diesel
- Fuel capacity: 5 500 liters
- RPM range: 430-1000 rpm
- Engine type: MAN 16RK215T (2580 kW)
- Traction motors: Toshiba SEA-106 (345 kW)
- Cylinders: 16
- Transmission: AC-DC-AC
Performance figures
- Maximum speed: 120 km/h (75 mph)
- Tractive effort
  - Starting: 410 kN (92,171.67 lb_{f})
  - Continuous: 350 kN (78,683.13 lb_{f})
Career
- Operators: Keretapi Tanah Melayu
- Power class: Class 29
- Numbers: 29101-29120
- Locale: Keretapi Tanah Melayu
- Delivered: 2005

The KTM Class 29 is a class of mainline diesel electric locomotives built in China by Dalian Locomotive and Rolling Stock Company for operations by Keretapi Tanah Melayu of Malaysia on its freight services.

== History ==
20 locomotives were acquired around 2005, but proved less than reliable than the Class 26 bought at the same time. By 2008 only 5 out of 20 were in service due to the high number of technical problems. As a consequence KTMB had to lease locomotives from India at a cost of $1000 per train per day. As the units were still under warranty, the manufacturing company was called in and a KTMB task force was formed to fix the problem. By December 2008 eighteen units had been overhauled and were in working order.

While the main objective of the locomotive is to pull heavy freight, it easily handles local shuttle trains with an operating speed averaging 110 km/h(70 mph).

== Naming Of Class 29 ==
=== All class 29 bear the named of the wood that found in Malaysia. ===
Fleet Number	Name	Fleet Number	Name
29101	CENGAL	29111	SERAYA
29102	MERANTI	29112	DAMAR
29103	MERBAU	29113	NYATOH
29104	JATI	29114	RAMIN
29105	MERSAWA	29115	KEMPAS
29106	BELIAN	29116	SEPETIR
29107	KERANJI	29117	TEMBUSU
29108	BALAU	29118	TUALANG
29109	KERUING	29119	MEDANG
29110	PENAGA	29120	KLEDANG

== See also ==
- New Zealand DL class locomotive, similar design manufactured by Dalian Locomotive Company for export to New Zealand
