= New Zealand DM class locomotive =

Type of diesel-electric locomotives being manufactured for KiwiRail

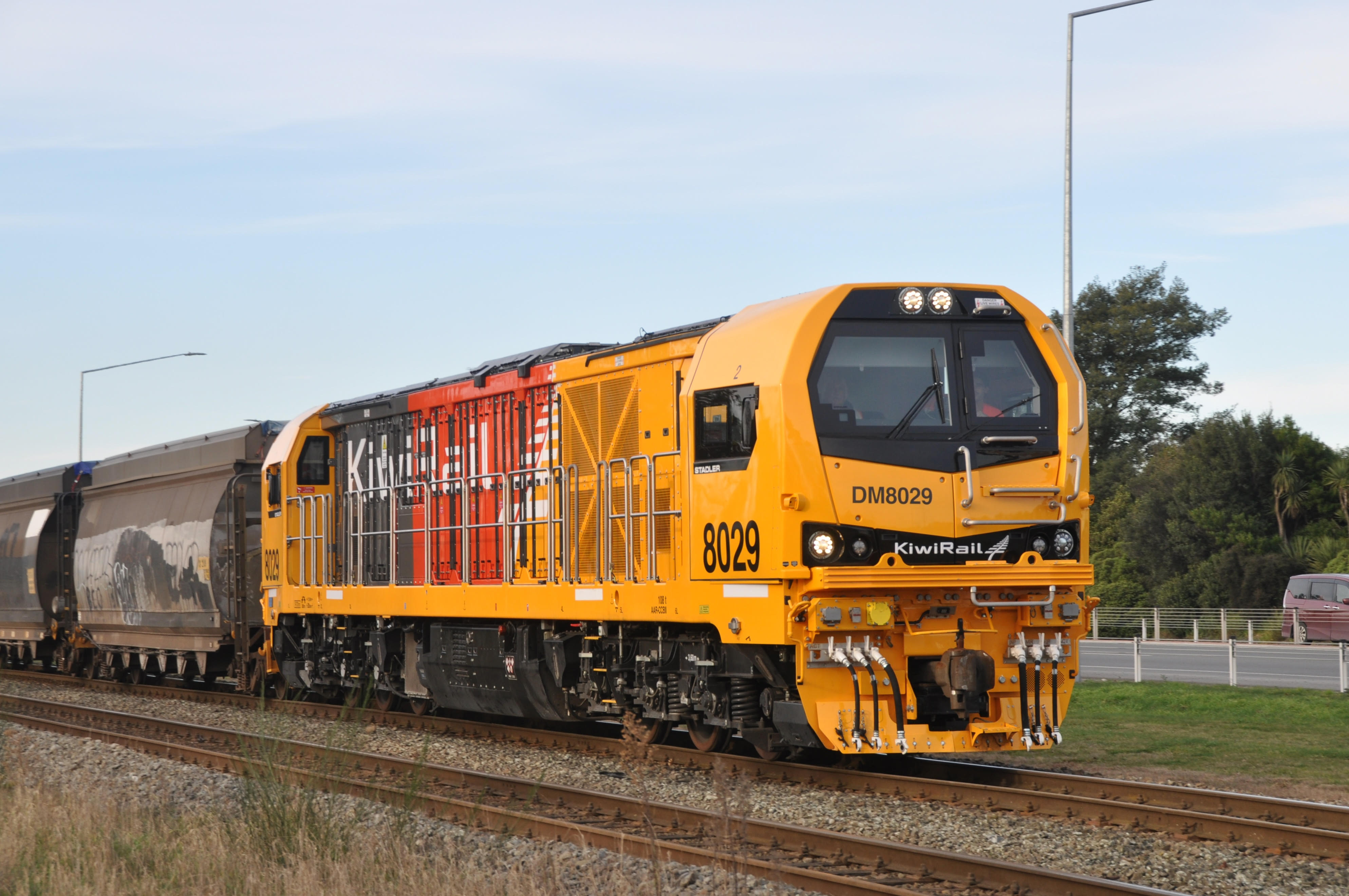
- KiwiRail DM8029 hauling a freight train in 2025
Type and origin
- Power type: Diesel-electric
- Builder: Stadler Rail, Valencia
Specifications
- Configuration
  - UIC: Co′Co′
- Gauge: 1,067 mm (3 ft 6 in)
- Length: 20.002 metres (65.62 ft)
- Width: 2.810 metres (9 ft 2.6 in)
- Loco weight: < 108t
- Fuel type: Diesel, HVO
- Fuel capacity: 6,500 litres (1,400 imp gal; 1,700 US gal)
- Prime mover: Caterpillar C175-16, Stage V
- Engine type: diesel engine
- Loco brake: Pneumatic; Dynamic: rheostatic; Bail-off feature
Performance figures
- Maximum speed: 100 km/h (62 mph)
- Power output: 3,000 kilowatts (4,000 hp)
- Tractive effort: 415 kN (93,000 lbf)
Career
- Number in class: 66
- Delivered: 18 as of October 2026
- Current owner: KiwiRail

The New Zealand DM class (Note: KiwiRail have stated that "DM" will be used as the classification for the locomotives.) of 66 diesel-electric locomotives is currently under manufacture for New Zealand rail operator KiwiRail by Stadler Rail in Spain. The locomotives are expected to be introduced between 2025 and 2026. The first two locomotives arrived in October 2024 to commence testing and commissioning, with the first locomotive, DM8029, entering service on 21 July 2025.

== Background ==
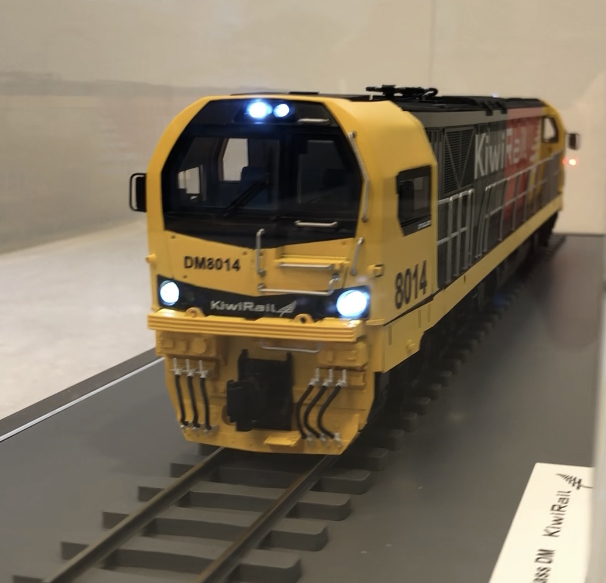
Model of a DM class locomotive

In May 2020, KiwiRail released a public tender for new mainline locomotives to replace the 47 total DX class, which were nearly 50 years old at the time. The 2021 New Zealand budget allocated NZD$722.7 million to purchase new mainline locomotives, shunt locomotives and wagons.

On 11 October 2021, Stadler Rail announced it had won the contract to supply 57 new locomotives for KiwiRail. Stadler stated the contract was worth €228 million, or NZD$403 million. The Rail & Maritime Transport Union, the main union representing KiwiRail staff, welcomed the purchase. The company had previously won a contract to supply 34 similar R200 locomotives to the Taiwan Railway Administration in 2019.

In February 2024, KiwiRail and Stadler announced an order for a further nine DM class locomotives equipped with European Train Control System (ETCS) technology for deployment on the North Island rail network. The last ten locomotives from the first order will also be fitted with ETCS, bringing the total number of ETCS-fitted DM class locomotives in the North Island to 19, and the total number of DM class locomotives in the South Island to 47, of a total of 66 DM class locomotives. ETCS will enable the locomotives to operate in the Auckland metro area, which is fitted with ETCS Level 1 signalling, and future-proofs the class to safely operate in the Wellington metro area once trackside signalling there is upgraded to ETCS.

=== Classification and numbering ===
KiwiRail has stated the locomotives will be classified as class "DM". The original impression of the design showed the numbering to be in the 10,000 series. Mock-ups of the locomotive cab show numbers in the 6000 series, which has not been used since the withdrawal of the DQ and QR class locomotives. It was reported in late 2022 that the design phase had been completed, and the first locomotives are now in production, to be completed in mid-2024. As of November 2023, the class numbering is in the 8000 series.

=== Production, testing and entry into service ===
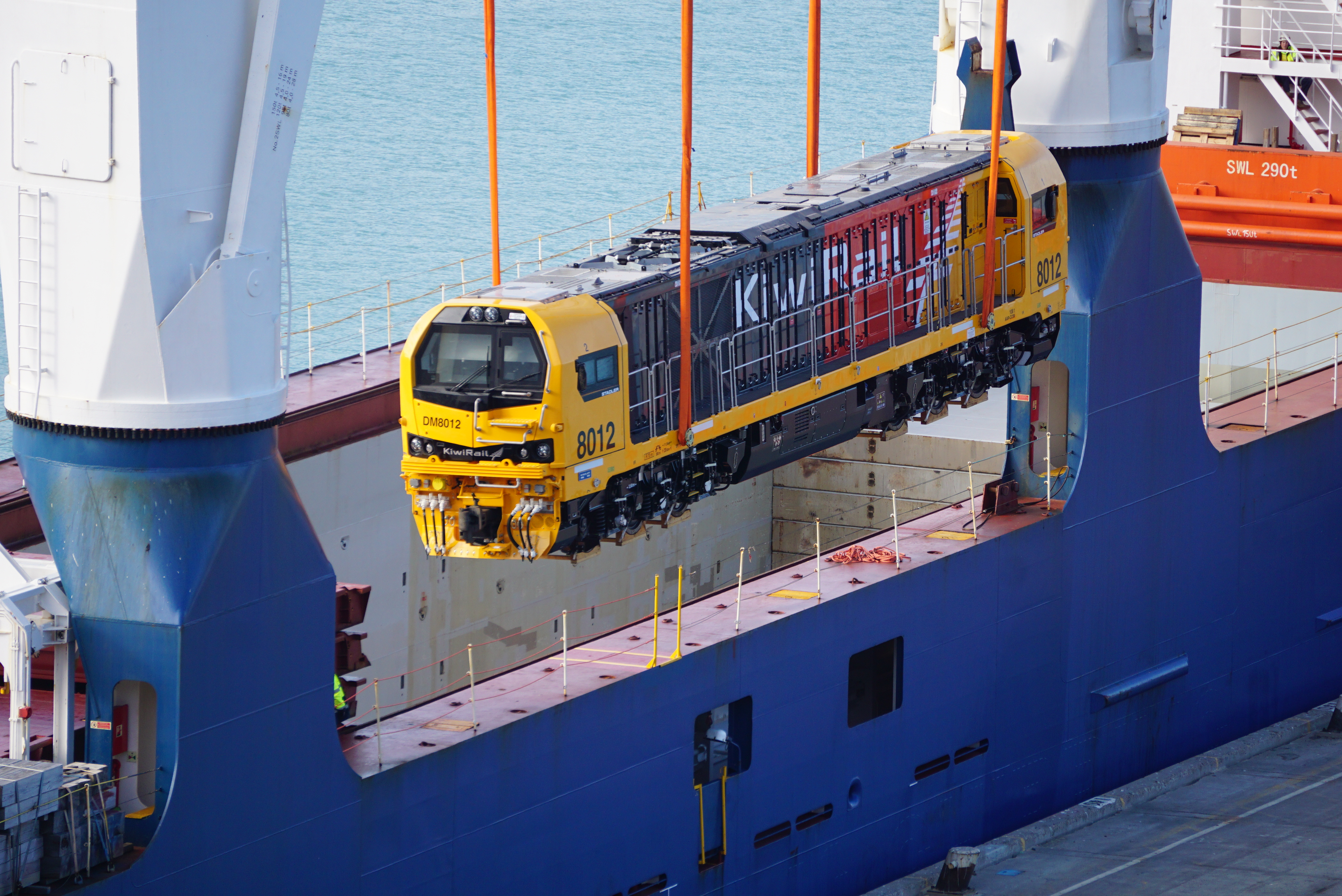
Arrival of first locomotive in New Zealand (Lyttelton), 19 October 2024

KiwiRail posted a video on their Facebook page on 8 February 2024 of the prototype locomotive at the Stadler manufacturing plant in Spain. The short clip shows one of the new DM class locomotives running on a factory track under its own power. The post stated that the first two diesel locomotives will join the KiwiRail fleet later in 2024.

The first two locomotives, DM8012 and DM8029, were unloaded from the Eemslift Nadine at the Port of Lyttelton near Christchurch on 19 October 2024. They were described as the prototypes and were commissioned at KiwiRail's Middleton Depot, undergoing in-service trials. They entered service on 21 July 2025, with DM8029 hauling its first train from Middleton to Timaru.

The second delivery, also consisting of two locomotives (DM8035 and DM8064) arrived at the port on 3 November 2025.

==== 2026 Christchurch e‑scooter fatality ====
On 23 January 2026, DM8029 was operating a freight service when it struck a man riding an electric scooter at the Lincoln Road level crossing in Addington, Christchurch. The man, a 30-year-old French national named Maxime Antoine Vandenbosch, was pronounced dead at the scene by emergency services.

== See also ==
- New Zealand DL class locomotive
- Locomotives of New Zealand
