= New Zealand DX class locomotive =

Class of 49 New Zealand diesel locomotives

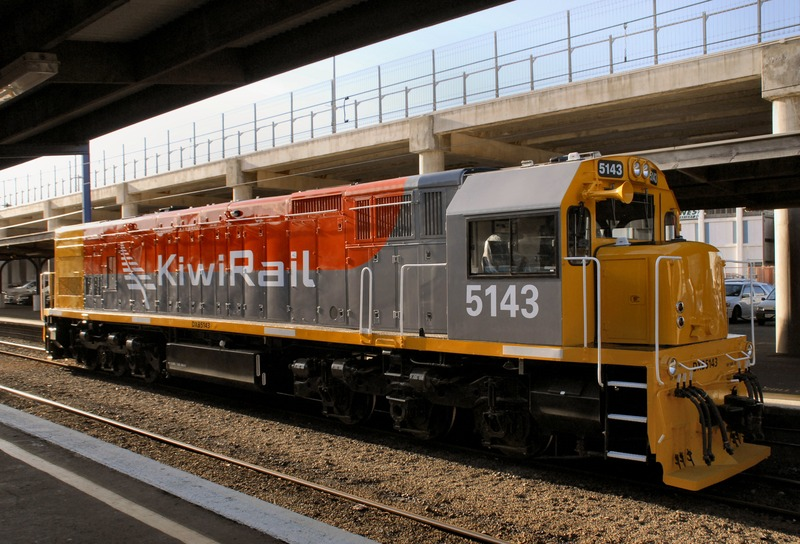
- DXB5143, the first locomotive to be painted in the KiwiRail livery, at Wellington Railway Station in July 2008 for the launch of KiwiRail
Type and origin
- Power type: Diesel-electric
- Builder: GE Transportation, United States
- Model: GE U26C
- Build date: 1972–1975
Specifications
- Configuration
  - Commonwealth: Co-Co
- Gauge: 3 ft 6 in (1,067 mm)
- Length: 16.9 metres (55 ft 5 in)
- Width: 2.74 metres (9 ft 0 in)
- Height: 3.70 metres (12 ft 2 in)
- Axle load: DX 16.25 t (15.99 long tons; 17.91 short tons); DXR 17.5 t (17.2 long tons; 19.3 short tons)
- Adhesive weight: DX 97.5 t (96.0 long tons; 107.5 short tons); DXR 105 t (103 long tons; 116 short tons)
- Loco weight: DX 97.5 t (96.0 long tons; 107.5 short tons); DXR 105 t (103 long tons; 116 short tons)
- Prime mover: General Electric 7FDL-12
- RPM range: 400–1050 rpm
- Engine type: V12 Diesel engine
- Aspiration: Turbocharged
- Alternator: General Electric GTA-11
- Traction motors: Six
- Cylinders: 12
- Transmission: 25/64 gear ratio
Performance figures
- Maximum speed: 105 km/h (65 mph)
- Power output: DX/DXB/DXC; 2,050 kW (2,750 hp) original 2,240 kW (3,000 hp) uprated DXB/DXC/DXR; 2,420 kW (3,250 hp)
- Tractive effort: DX 259 kN (58,000 lbf) continuous
Career
- Number in class: 49
- Numbers: 2600–2648 (original); 5016–5520 (TMS); DXR 8007, 8022
- Nicknames: "Dixies" (DX)
- First run: DX 9 November 1972 - 11 September 1976; DXR 22 October 1993 - 21 December 2005; DXC 1997
- Disposition: 44 in service 2 rebuilt as DXR; 1 scrapped 1 under overhaul 1 withdrawn

The New Zealand DX class locomotive (Note: With the introduction of the Traffic Monitoring System in 1979, the class classification was capitalised, whereas previously the second letter was a smaller capital letter, that is, D^{X}.) is a type of diesel-electric locomotive that currently operates on New Zealand's national railway network. The class consists of 49 locomotives, of which 40 are owned by KiwiRail in New Zealand, with 8 owned by Traxtion in South Africa. They have a Co-Co wheel arrangement.

Built by GE Transportation in Erie, Pennsylvania, United States, they were introduced to New Zealand between 1972 and 1976. The class is based on the General Electric U26C model, a narrow-gauge version of the GE U23C model, which in itself is a V12 version of the 16V GE U30C.

The locomotives are regarded as one of the most successful purchases in NZR's history. They have seen several upgrades since their introduction and three sub-classes now exist: the DXB, DXC and DXR. In 2025, it was announced that 46 of the locomotives had been sold to a South African purchaser, Traxtion. The first eight locomotives arrived in South Africa in July 2026. The final DX class locomotives are planned to be withdrawn by June 2027.

== Introduction ==
The D^{X} class was introduced in response to a requirement for a more powerful locomotive to handle traffic on the North Island Main Trunk (NIMT). Before their introduction, the heaviest freight and passenger trains on the line required two members of the 1,060-kilowatt (1,420 hp) D^{A} class to haul them. The D^{X} class could haul heavier and faster trains than two D^{A} locomotives, even though they produced 70 kilowatts less than two D^{A} locomotives could. A single D^{X} weighed 97.5 tonnes compared to the two D^{A} class locomotives' combined weight of 162 tonnes.

Tenders opened for what was to become known as the D^{X} class in December 1969. The order for the first 15 D^{X} class locomotives was placed on 24 August 1970. They were the first locomotives built by General Electric in New Zealand and were the most powerful ever used in New Zealand at the time of their introduction.

=== Classification ===
The classification of the new locomotives was announced as the "D^{X}" class. Diesel mainline locomotive classes begin with "D", followed by another letter. "X" was out of sequence, as the previous class introduced was the Mitsubishi D^{J} class in 1968. Up to the D^{X} class introduction, all classes had used letters A to J, and shunting locomotives used S. The use of X for the D^{X} class was a specific reference to the NZR X class locomotives of 1907, which were specifically introduced for use on the North Island Main Trunk, and were much more powerful than any previous locomotive class. NZR chose D^{X} classification for practical reasons as well; the next locomotive classification in sequence (D^{K} class) would have grouped a General Electric supplied locomotive after a Mitsubishi supplied class, secondly, the X classification distinguished the class in terms of power output.

=== First phase ===
The first 15 members of the class (D^{X} 2600 – D^{X} 2614) arrived in Auckland Harbour in February 1972.

Their introduction led to a dispute over additional pay between New Zealand Railways and the Engine Drivers, Firemen and Cleaners' Association (then the trade union representing NZR locomotive staff). The union argued that more powerful locomotives meant less work for its members and successfully took NZR to the Government Railways Industrial Tribunal for additional pay in July 1972. The extra pay was known as a "horsepower allowance".

The locomotives were progressively introduced into service from November 1972.

Initially, the class were confined to the North Island Main Trunk as their 16.25-tonne axle load was too heavy for many of the bridges on the other lines. As it was, several bridges and viaducts on the NIMT had to be strengthened to take the weight of the locomotives. Their prime movers were found to be less reliable than NZR was accustomed to with its other locomotives.

=== Second phase ===
The first DX class locomotives proved to be a success. With bridges progressively strengthened throughout the North Island, and to further increase capacity on the NIMT in particular, 34 more members of the class were introduced in 1975 and 1976. The second phase DX had a number of improvements, including additional dynamic braking, larger sandboxes and a better excitation control system.

== In service ==
=== History ===
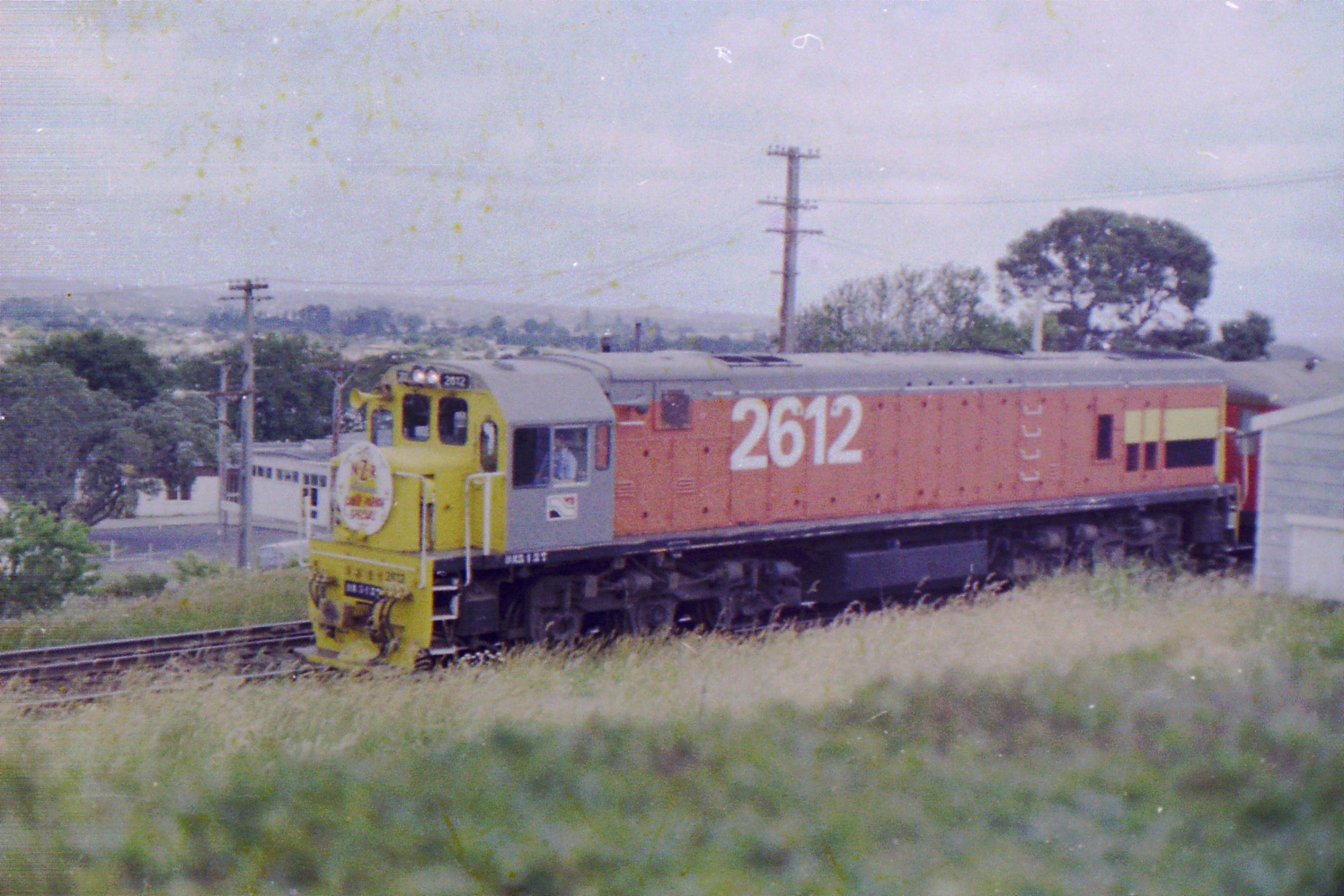
D^{X} 2612 (DX5137) at Avondale in Auckland in the late 1970s. Note the two small windows in the cab of the locomotive, replaced in 1988 with a single window as a result of single-crewing.

The DX class was initially used for heavy freight trains on the NIMT, especially on the central section where the power was needed. Most of the 49 class members in service by 1976 were used on this line, but a few also operated between Palmerston North and New Plymouth via the Marton - New Plymouth Line most days of the week, and also occasionally on passenger trains between Wellington and Masterton on the Wairarapa Line. In 1974, a DX travelled on the North Auckland Line as far north as Whangarei, and there-after they saw occasional use in Northland in the late 1970s and early 1980s, but it did not have any regular assignments there.

From their introduction in 1972, a member of the class was assigned to haul the prestigious Silver Star overnight NIMT passenger express. Previously, the train required two DA class locomotives. The DX class was also used on the Northerner overnight passenger train when it was introduced in November 1975.

In June 1988, a major reshuffle of the mainline locomotive fleet took place nationwide as a result of the opening of the NIMT electrification and introduction of the EF class to handle the central section. For the DX class, this meant leaving the upper North Island and being split into two fleets for service between Wellington, Gisborne and New Plymouth, and one in Dunedin. This was the first use of the class on the Palmerston North - Gisborne Line and the northern section of the Wairarapa Line between Masterton and Woodville. At the same time, experiments began with DX class locomotives in the then electrified Otira Tunnel. While the initial tests were unsuccessful, later testing in 1991 found that modifying the locomotives with special air intake ducts and adding ventilation fans would allow the DX class to be used without electric locomotives.

In the mid-1990s, a small number of DXs returned to Auckland for use between Auckland and Tauranga via the East Coast Main Trunk, on the Kinleith Branch and regular service between Auckland and Whangarei. This was the first use of the class in regular service east of Hamilton. In 2000, a DX ventured north of Whangarei, which remains the last expansion phase of DX class territory.

=== Current ===
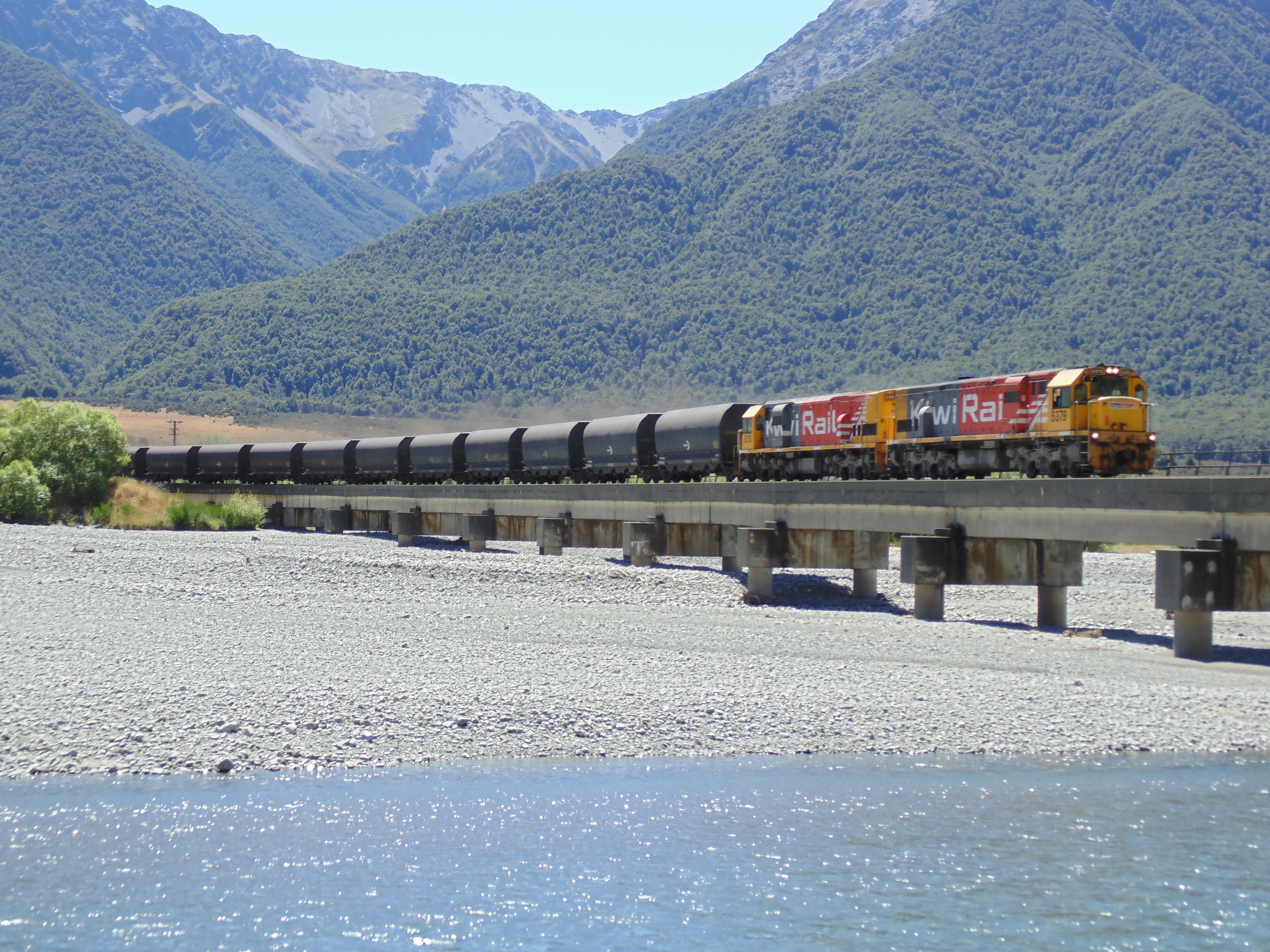
Two DXC locomotives on a coal train from Ngakawau to Lyttelton crossing the Waimakariri River bridge on 23 January 2015

The DX class is still used primarily on heavy freight trains. The class now operate in the South Island, predominantly hauling coal trains between the West Coast mines and the port of Lyttelton near Christchurch. The trains consist of up to 30 CE and CB class hopper wagons each carrying up to 52 tonnes of coal, and require six members of the class to haul the train up the 3% (1 in 33) west-east grade of the Otira Tunnel, and two members to haul it on the other sections of the line. These services are now exclusively hauled by the DXC sub-class. The class is also involved in general freight operations and is employed periodically to haul the TranzAlpine and Coastal Pacific passenger trains.

In the North Island, the DXB sub-class were the primary haulers of milk trains to Fonterra's Whareroa factory near Hāwera on the MNPL, usually operated in pairs to haul these trains up the 1 in 35 Westmere Bank north of Wanganui.

A small number, including both DXRs, were based in the upper North Island, primarily in general freight use on the ECMT. With the allocation of the new DL class locomotives to that area, these locomotives were transferred to the South Island in late 2011.

The class were also periodically used to haul through trains on the central NIMT when EF locomotives were unavailable or the electrification required maintenance. They were the primary haulers of the Capital Connection service between Palmerston North and Wellington.

In October 2013, KiwiRail reassigned six DXBs to the South Island due to the commissioning of the second batch of the DL class, leaving three assigned in the North Island. All of these locomotives, including the locomotives assigned to the South Island prior October 2013, were transferred back to the North Island to cover for the DL locomotives in March 2014, as the DL class were temporarily withdrawn from service after they tested positive for asbestos. All locomotives are now operating in the South Island as of March 2020.

=== Numbering ===
The DX class was originally numbered from 2600 to 2648 – which in common with NZR practice of the time was based on power output (2600 hp).

With the introduction of the computerised Traffic Monitoring System (TMS) in 1979, the class was soon renumbered. The DX class received four-digit numbers starting with 5, in which the fourth number is a check digit for the number. The locomotives were numbered in order, with D^{X} 2600 renumbered DX5016 (6 being the check digit) and D^{X} 2648 renumbered DX5517. The numbers 500x, 515x, 534x and 549x were not used as these numbers do not generate a valid check digit, and D^{X} 2639 never received a TMS number as it had been withdrawn by then.

The DXB and DXC sub-classes have kept their original TMS numbers, while the DXR class received new TMS numbers beginning with 8, numbered irrespective of their DX number. DX5045 received a new TMS number using the DXB algorithm (5520) when it was upgraded and returned to service following being involved in a fatal derailment at Te Wera in 2002 (when re-introduced into service, the DXB classification was used to denote what is now the DXC sub-class).

=== Livery ===
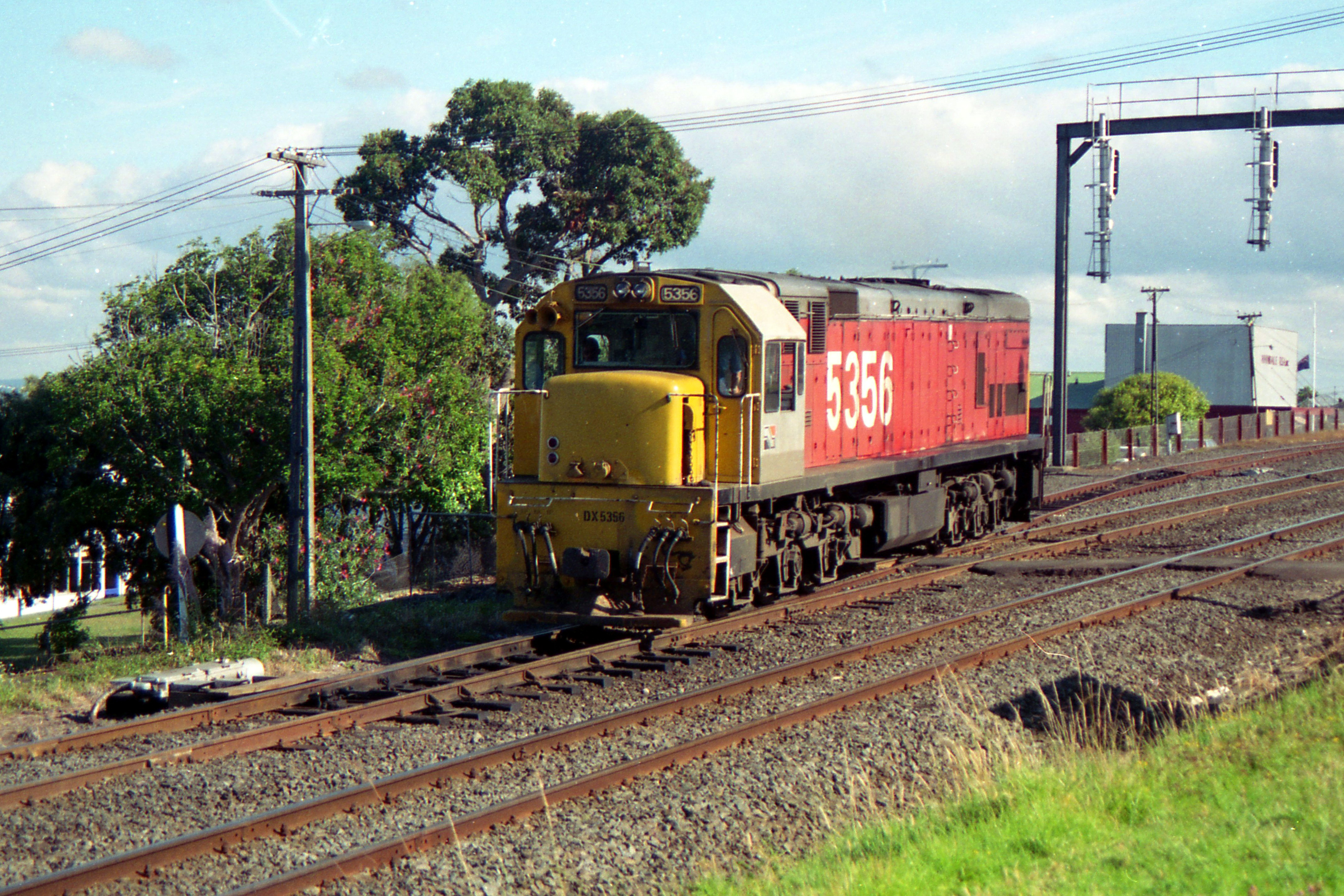
DX 5356 leaving Avondale in the late 1980s. The locomotive is painted in the International Orange or "Fruit Salad" livery of NZR from the late 1970s onwards. Note the single front window above the short hood.

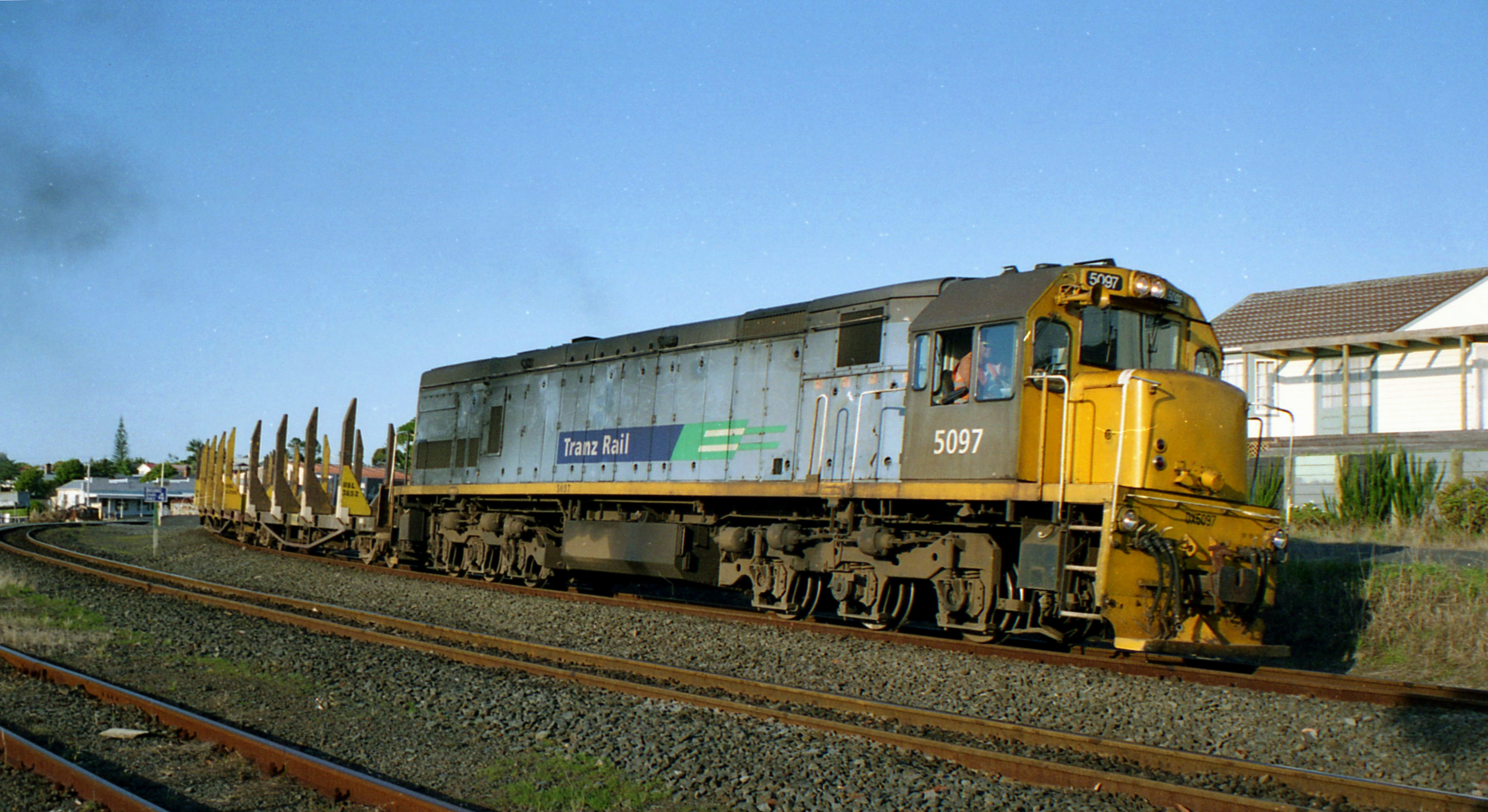
DX 5097 in Cato Blue livery with Tranz Rail logo, in Avondale, Auckland in December 2001

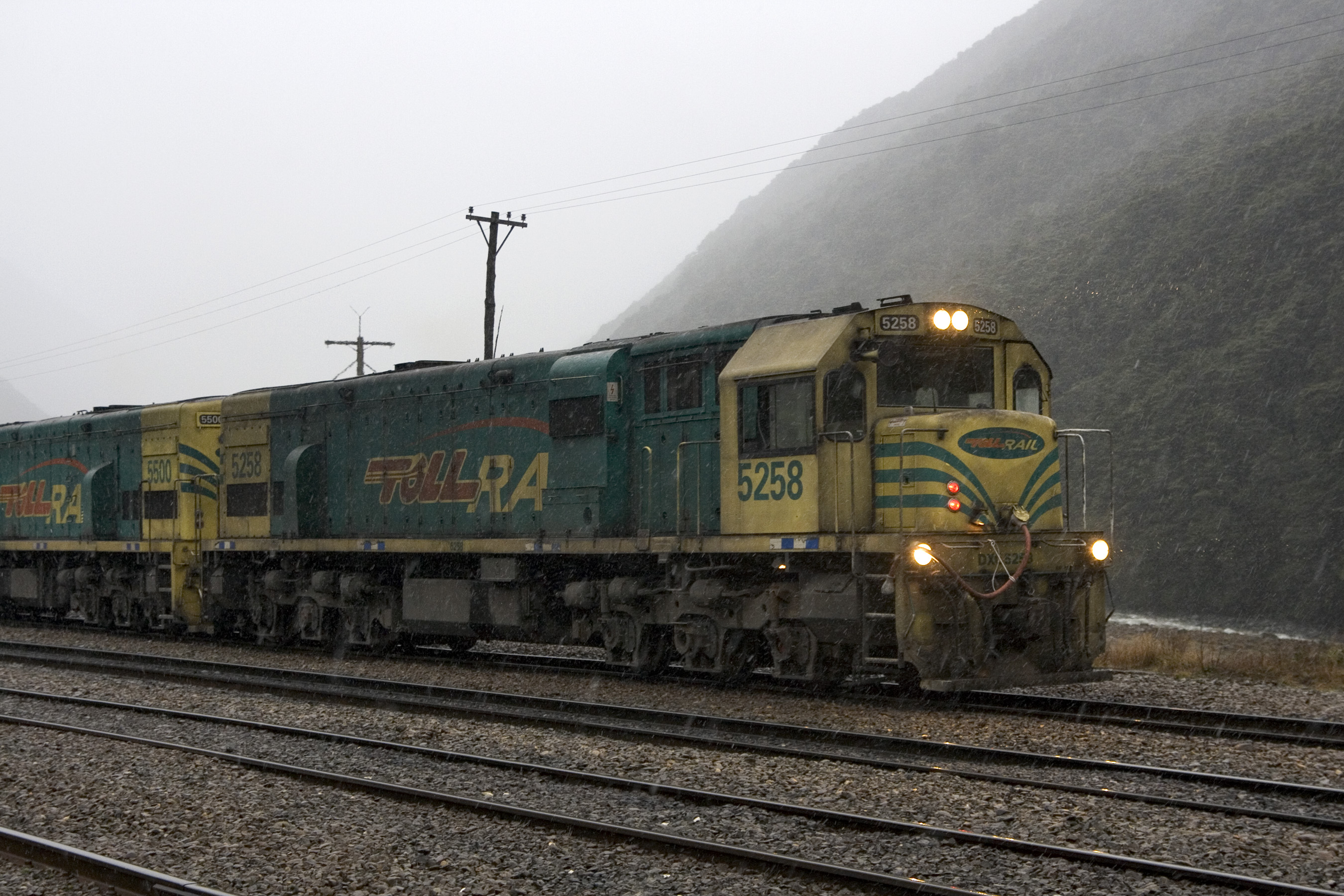
DXCs 5258 and 5500 in Toll Rail Corn-Cob livery at Otira in July 2008

Upon introduction, all the DX class members were painted in a livery consisting of the locomotive body painted orange, except for a chrome yellow segment that curved down from the top of the locomotive's long hood and ran back to its trailing end. The cheat line separating the orange from the yellow was approximately halfway up the side of the locomotive. The reasons for this livery have not been established. This livery was known as "Clockwork Orange" after the Stanley Kubrick film "A Clockwork Orange." The bogies and fuel tank were painted a flat grey colour and North American automatic couplers were fitted – these being soon changed to a beefed-up version of the NZR chopper-type.

Between October 1976 and 1986, the entire class was repainted in the International Orange "Fruit Salad" livery – red, grey, and yellow, which most of the class wore until the end of the decade. This livery had the road numbers displayed on the sides of the locomotives in large white numbers with D^{X} 2612 the first to be painted as such. Since then, members of the DX class have received liveries including Cato Blue (Fruit Salad with blue instead of red), Bumble Bee (black and yellow), Corn-Cob (green and yellow) and the KiwiRail phase 1 and 2 schemes (grey, orange or red, and yellow). No DXs remain in the Fruit Salad, Cato Blue, Bumble Bee and Corn Cob liveries.

=== Upgrades ===
The locomotives received an upgrade during 1988 with the introduction of single-manning to improve visibility for the driver, with a large single front window replacing the original two small windows.

=== Fire suppression ===
Between 2013 and 2016, the DXC class were fitted with fire suppression to run the TranzAlpine through the 8.5-kilometre (5.3 mi) Otira Tunnel on the Midland Line due to a change in requirements resulting from the Commission of Inquiry in the Pike River Mine disaster, and as well on any other passenger trains on the Main North and Main South lines. Because of this, the number of Otira bankers have gone from three to five, which allows any locomotive without the system to be shut down. In mid 2016, the number of bankers were reduced from five to four. As of December 2016, all 32 locomotives have been fitted with fire suppression.

== Sub-classes ==
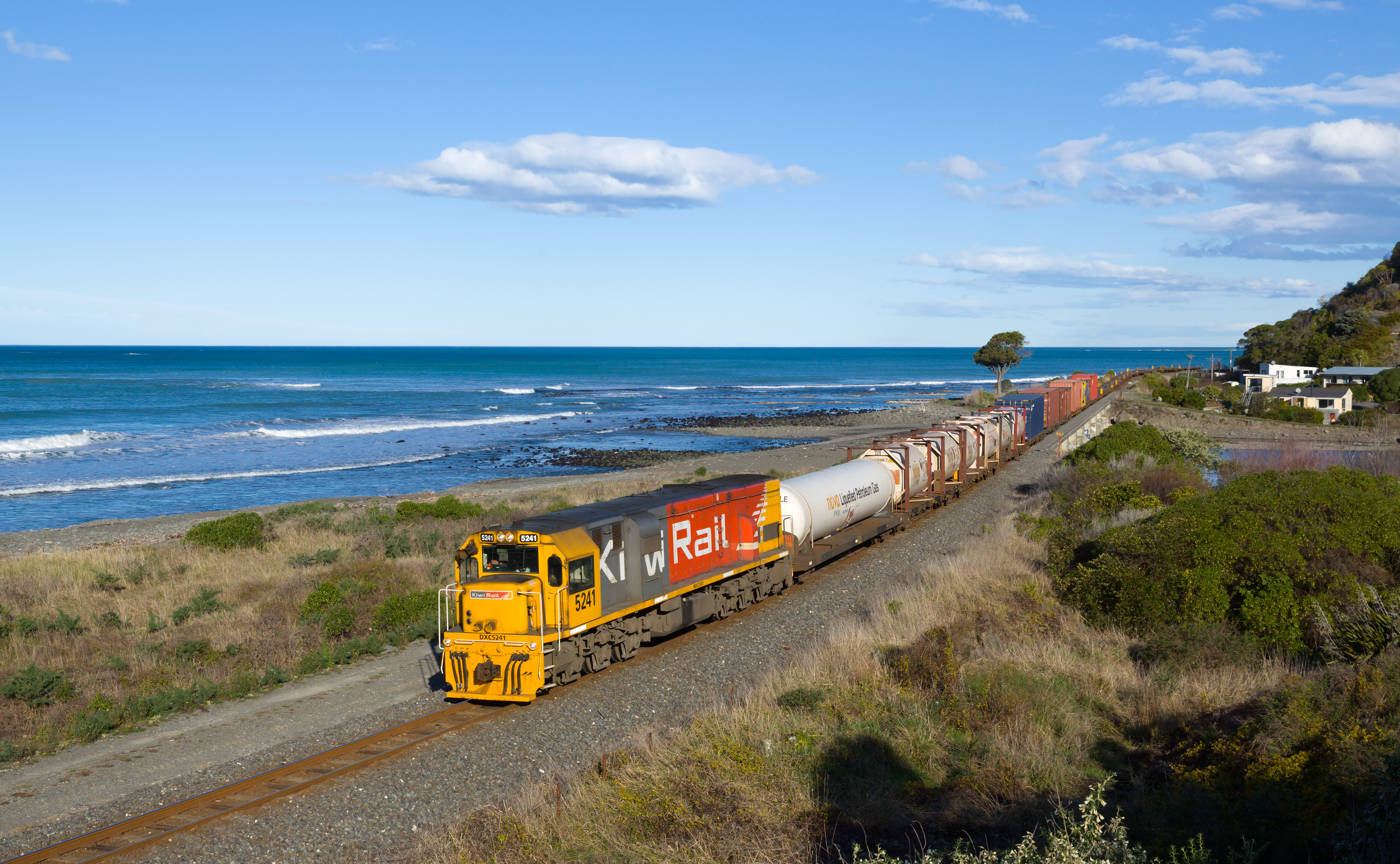
DXC 5241 hauling a Christchurch to Picton mixed freight train at Oaro in August 2015

The classifications DXB and DXC reflect modifications that have been carried out to the fleet. These include heavier drawgear, uprated engines, new cabs, (some have received DFT-style low hoods) and higher power traction motors.

The designation DXB denotes that the locomotive has been fitted with the Brightstar electronic traction control system, while DXC denotes that the locomotive has been additionally fitted with modified air intakes ("chutes") as well as all the other upgrades, including Brightstar. Thirteen of the original batch of 15 have been upgraded to DXB standard (DXC5039 and DXC5520 (née 5045) being the exceptions), and most of those from the subsequent batches have been upgraded to DXC standard – the exceptions being D^{X} 2639 (withdrawn from service in 1977).

The DXC sub-class was assigned to the South Island, as the modified air intakes were designed to assist in are useful for working the Midland Line, coal trains (see above), particularly in the formerly electrified Otira Tunnel section, whereas the DXB sub-class were predominantly assigned to the North Island. Following the introduction of the first twenty DL class locomotives, four DXBs were reassigned to the South Island for general freight service on the Main South Line, while DXC class locomotives have appeared in the North Island on shakedown runs after overhaul.

The plain DX class is designated by GE as U26C; the newer upgrades are designated C26-MMI (2,750 hp DXB/DXC) and C30-MMI (3,250 hp DXB/DXC).

== Rebuilds ==
=== DXR class ===
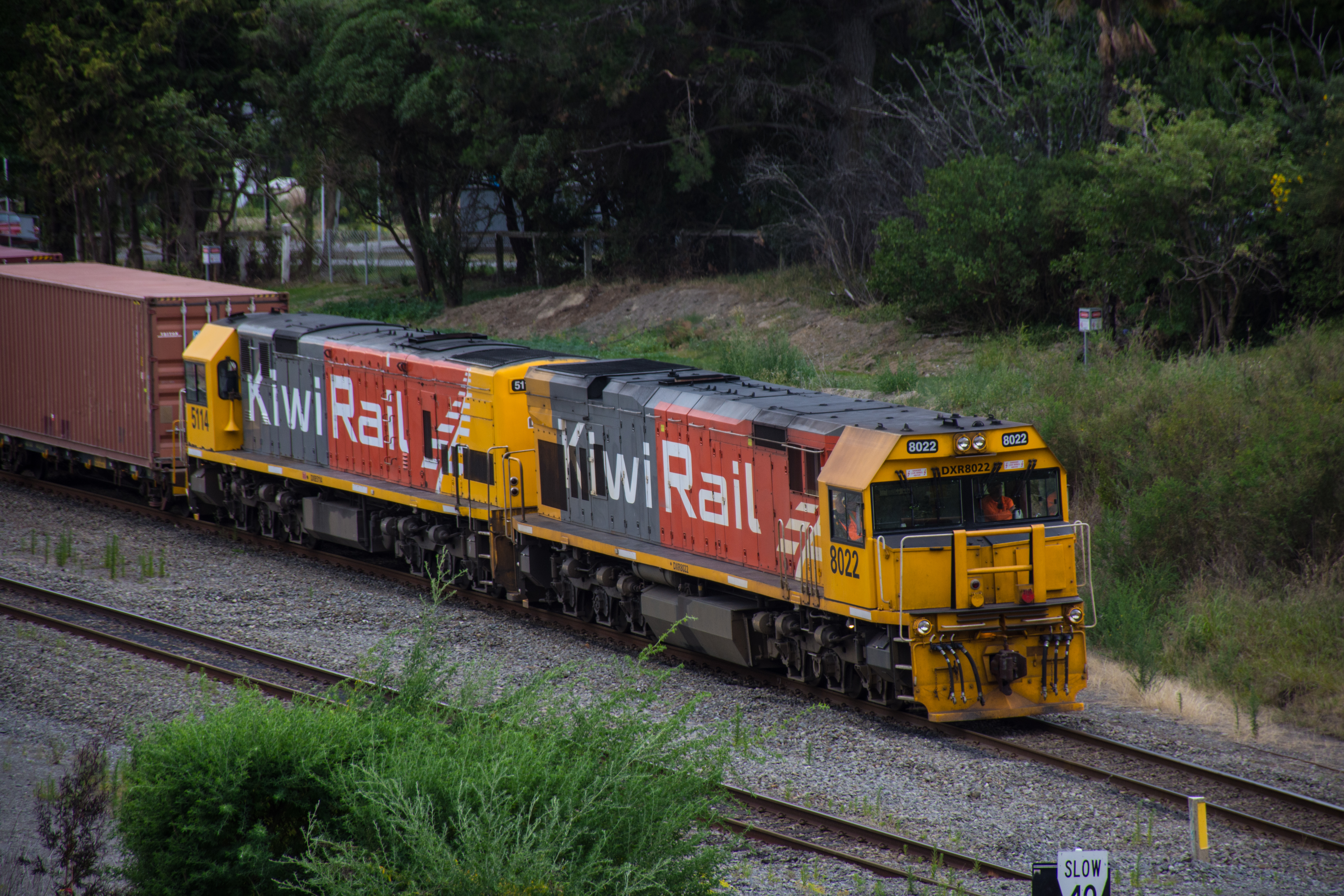
DXR8022/DX5114 on a train from the Racecourse Hill Siding at Darfield are held at Heathcote for DX5264/DF7132 on a local shunt and the return W4 coal empties, 2021

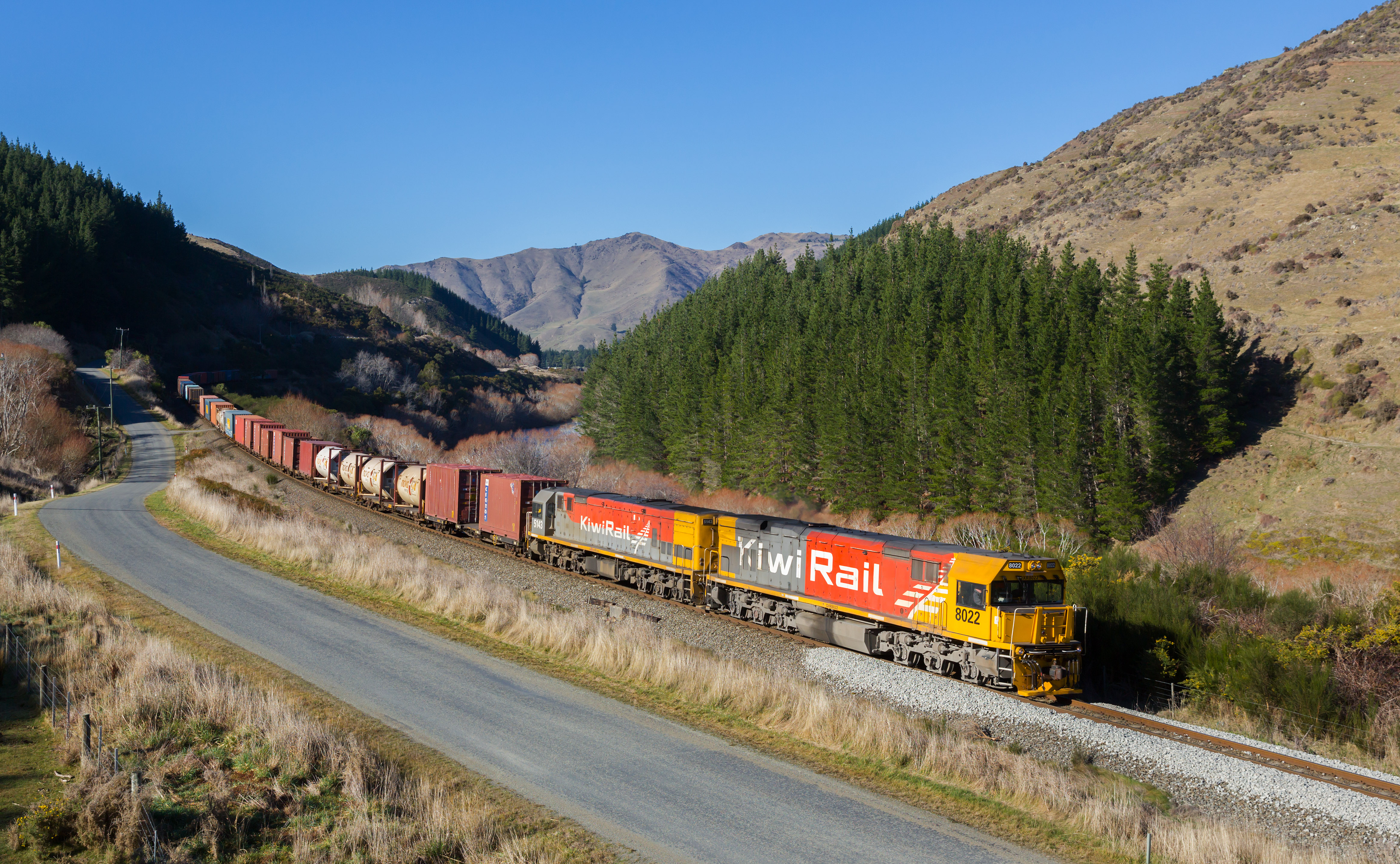
DXR8022 and DXB5143 at Ethelton with a container train from Picton to Christchurch in August 2015

In October 1993, New Zealand Rail Limited undertook a significant rebuilding of DX5362 into the first of what was to be a new sub-class, the DXR. DX5362 had been stored out of service at Hutt Workshops since early in 1989, suffering a cracked frame, and therefore was an ideal candidate for the rebuilding programme. Work began to fit the locomotive with a new 3,300 horsepower (2,500 kW) GE 7-FDL diesel engine, upgraded traction motors with a ratio of 5.17 to the then-standard DX ratio of 4.55, and a new design of "Universal Cab" with a shorter low hood and more angular appearance. The use of 'R' (like the DBR class) denotes that the new locomotive was a rebuilt DX.

The newly rebuilt DX received the number DXR8007 when it entered service in 1993, along with the prototype DFT class rebuild, DFT7008. It was intended that New Zealand Rail would rebuild all of the DX class locomotives to DXR specifications similar to the programme of the rebuilding of the DF class into the DFT class, but after the privatisation of New Zealand Rail Limited (renamed Tranz Rail in 1995) later in 1993, the new management decided not to undertake further DX class rebuilds, due to the cost. One locomotive was however rebuilt to these original DXR specifications during the Tranz Rail years, DX5310 in 2001 for its return to service following its derailment at Pukehou while hauling the Bay Express in 1995. It did not though receive a new DXR style cab, so it retained its original DX classification until it was overhauled to DXC standards in 2010.

Following the purchase of Tranz Rail by Toll in 2003, the new management authorised the rebuild of DX5235 – itself having been stored since being damaged in a collision in Christchurch in 2000 – which became DXR8022. The new DXR featured minor differences in the carbody hood and a MkII version of the "Universal Cab" which was boxier than the previous MkI variant as applied to DXR8007. The new DXR rebuild was classified as DXR8022 (due to DXR801 not generating a valid check digit) and entered service in late 2005. It was decided to rebuild DXR8007 to match 8022 in the interests of standardisation, and so 8007 was again rebuilt at Hutt Workshops in 2006.

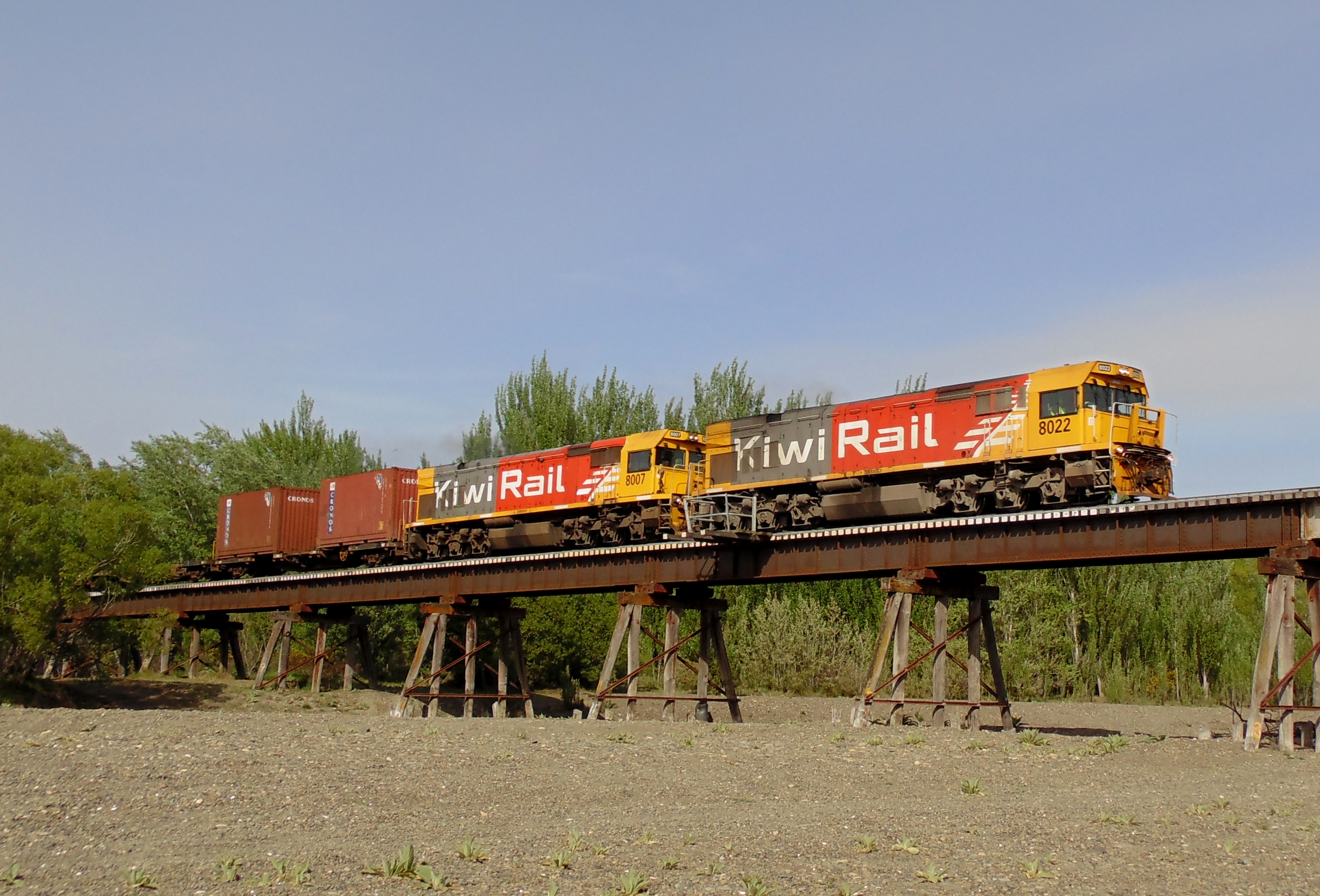
The two DXRs on the Waipara River Bridge with a freight train in November 2016

Upon each rebuild, GE classified 8022 (and reclassified 8007) as model C30-8Mi. As rebuilt by New Zealand Rail, DXR8007 was classified by GE as their model C30-7M.

In 2007, DXR8022 was one of the locomotives involved in a biofuel trial using a fuel mix of 5 per cent biodiesel and 95 per cent regular diesel over a period of six months. With the introduction of the DL class locomotives into service the two DXRs were transferred to the South Island, and are now used between Middleton and Picton.

At 2,420 kilowatts (3,250 hp), the DXR class was the most powerful class of diesel-electric locomotive ever operated in New Zealand, until the introduction of the DL class in 2010, which surpassed the DXRs power output with 2,700 kilowatts (3,600 hp). The DL in turn was eclipsed by the DM class in 2025, with a power output of 3,000 kilowatts (4,000 hp).

=== DXE class ===
In mid-2018, it was announced 15 DX class locomotives are to be overhauled and given an electronic upgrade. The locomotives are to be overhauled with 3,300 hp-rated GE 7FDL-12 EFI diesel engine prime movers with electronic fuel injection. They will also be given the latest version of the Brightstar engine control system, new engine control and wiring harness, and new high capacity fuel tank, along with a new battery box assembly.

Also involved in the overhauls will be the strengthening of the underframe, and fitting of new 2MN maintenance-free draw gear, electronic braking system and full locomotive rewire and new engine oil coolers. The locomotives will be reclassified as DXE, will have a newly designed long-hood (similar to the DXRs) fitted with chutes, and the short-hood will be lowered. It is planned this will give the locomotives a life extension of 20 years. As of early 2020, the project is on hold due to the cost of rebuilding coming close to, or exceeding the cost of buying new locomotives. 5500 is currently stored as an under-frame.

DXC5212 is the first of five locomotives to be fitted with the new EFI prime movers, but remains as a DXC due to the cancellation of the DXE project. As of May 2021, 5212 and 5454 have overhauled and have been fitted with the EFI prime mover. 5391 is currently under overhaul, and will be the third to receive one.

== Withdrawals and disposals ==
As of 2021, three DX-class locomotives had been withdrawn from service. The first, D^{X} 2639 was involved in a crash south of the Parnell Tunnel near Newmarket station, at around 4:00pm on 23 March 1977. The locomotive was hauling a Wellington to Auckland express freight train when it crashed head-on into an Auckland to Helensville passenger train being hauled by D^{A} 1426 that was on the wrong line. The cause was related to human error during a signalling failure. D^{X} 2639 was subsequently written off and scrapped in September 1978, after less than a year in service.

The second DX to be withdrawn is DXC5500, which was stripped for the now-defunct DXE project. The locomotive is currently stored at Hutt Workshops as a chassis-only. It is unlikely for the locomotive to be rebuilt and returned to service.

In December 2025, South African rail operator Traxtion announced it had purchased all operable condition DX class locomotives (described by their model numbers - U26C and C30MEI). The 46 locomotives will be shipped in four tranches between April 2026 and August 2027. The first eight locomotives arrived in South Africa in July 2026.

== Replacement ==
In August 2017, KiwiRail announced they were in discussions with global suppliers, including General Electric, Electro-Motive Diesel, Alstom, CRRC and Stadler Rail to construct replacements for the remainder of the class. It was expected the first replacements would arrive in 2022/23. Stadler won the tender to build the new locomotives, to be classified DM class.

== See also ==
- South African Class 34-000
- South African Class 34-400
- South African Class 34-500
- South African Class 34-900
