= Rail and Maritime Transport Union =

RMTU
- Rail & Maritime Transport Union Inc.
- Headquarters: Wellington, New Zealand
- Location: New Zealand
- Key people: Todd Valster, general secretary Aubrey Wilkinson, national president
- Affiliations: NZCTU, ITF, Labour Party
- Website: www.rmtunion.org.nz

The Rail & Maritime Transport Union (RMTU) is a trade union in New Zealand. It represents transport workers in all aspects of the transport industry; rail, road and ports.

The RMTU is affiliated with the New Zealand Council of Trade Unions, the International Transport Workers' Federation, the International Centre of Labour Solidarity (ICLS) and the New Zealand Labour Party.
